= 2008 Portland Timbers season =

Portland Timbers
2008 season
- President: Merritt Paulson
- Head coach: Gavin Wilkinson
- Stadium: PGE Park; Portland, Oregon
- USL-1: League: 11th Playoffs: Did not qualify
- U.S. Open Cup: First round
- Cascadia Cup: 3rd
- Top goalscorer: League: Chris Brown (8 goals); All: Chris Brown (9 goals)
- Highest home attendance: 13,050 vs. CHA (Sep 11)
- Lowest home attendance: League: 4,921 vs. MIN (Apr 24); All: 3,089 vs. HWU (Jun 10)
- Average home league attendance: League: 8,567; All: 8,225
Primary colors	Secondary colors	Third colors

The 2008 Portland Timbers season was the 8th season for the Portland Timbers—the third incarnation of a club to bear the Portland Timbers name—of the now-defunct USL First Division, the second-tier league of the United States and Canada at the time.

== Preseason ==
March 28, 2008	Portland Timbers	1–2	San Jose Earthquakes (MLS)	Portland, Oregon
19:30 (PDT)	Karalexis 71'	Report	8' Kamara; 13' Salinas	Stadium: Merlo Field; Attendance: 1,168

March 30, 2008	Portland Timbers	1–0	Gonzaga Bulldogs (NCAA)	Forest Grove, Oregon
14:00 (PDT)	Dombrowski 65'	Report		Stadium: Lincoln Park Stadium; Attendance: 913

April 11, 2008	Portland Pilots (NCAA)	1–1	Portland Timbers	Portland, Oregon
19:00 (PDT)	Emory 88'	Report	49' Knowles	Stadium: Merlo Field; Attendance: 553

== Regular season ==
=== April ===
April 8, 2008 USL-1	Portland Timbers	1–0	Puerto Rico Islanders	Portland, Oregon
19:00 (PDT)	Brown 71'	Report	(red card) 40' Atieno	Stadium: PGE Park; Attendance: 10,977; Referee: Fotis Bazakos (USA)

April 24, 2008 USL-1	Portland Timbers	2–1	Minnesota Thunder	Portland, Oregon
19:00 (PDT)	Brown 9'; Higgins 65'	Report	41' Paye	Stadium: PGE Park; Attendance: 4,921; Referee: Yader Reyes (USA)

April 26, 2008 USL-1 / CC	Portland Timbers	2–0	Seattle Sounders	Portland, Oregon
19:00 (PDT)	Suzuki 6'; Guante 76'	Report		Stadium: PGE Park; Attendance: 9,894; Referee: Colin Tait (USA)

=== May ===
May 8, 2008 USL-1	Portland Timbers	0–0	Rochester Rhinos	Portland, Oregon
19:00 (PDT)				Stadium: PGE Park; Attendance: 7,519; Referee: Alejandro Mariscal (USA)

May 10, 2008 USL-1 / CC	Seattle Sounders	0–0	Portland Timbers	Seattle
19:00 (PDT)		Report		Stadium: Qwest Field; Attendance: 10,184; Referee: Edvin Jurisevic (USA)

May 16, 2008 USL-1	Puerto Rico Islanders	2–2	Portland Timbers	Bayamón PUR
17:00 (PDT)	Gbandi 20'; Krause 25'	Report	26' Olum; 83' Brown	Stadium: Juan Ramón Loubriel Stadium; Attendance: 6,922; Referee: Fernando Iturriaga (USA)

May 18, 2008 USL-1	Miami FC	0–0	Portland Timbers	Olympia Heights, Florida
19:00 (PDT)		Report		Stadium: Tropical Park Stadium; Attendance: 1,020; Referee: Joe Caraccio (USA)

May 24, 2008 USL-1 / CC	Portland Timbers	0–1	Vancouver Whitecaps	Portland, Oregon
19:00 (PDT)		Report	60' Arze	Stadium: PGE Park; Attendance: 8,688; Referee: Yader Reyes (USA)

May 26, 2008 USL-1	Portland Timbers	0–2	Miami FC	Portland, Oregon
14:00 (PDT)	Suzuki (red card) 45'	Report	43' (pen.), 68' Afonso	Stadium: PGE Park; Attendance: 6,921; Referee: Tyler Ploeger (USA)

May 30, 2008 USL-1	Montreal Impact	0–1	Portland Timbers	Montreal Canada
16:30 (PDT)		Report	45' Brown	Stadium: Saputo Stadium; Attendance: 13,034 (SO); Referee: Domenic Scali (Canada)

=== June ===
June 1, 2008 USL-1	Rochester Rhinos	2–1	Portland Timbers	Rochester, New York
15:00 (PDT)	Delicâte 14'; Menyongar 80'	Report	78' J. Thompson	Stadium: PAETEC Park; Attendance: 5,123; Referee: Tony Russo (USA)

June 5, 2008 USL-1	Portland Timbers	0–0	Minnesota Thunder	Portland, Oregon
19:00 (PDT)		Report		Stadium: PGE Park; Attendance: 5,651; Referee: Andrew Gage (USA)

June 7, 2008 USL-1 / CC	Vancouver Whitecaps	3–1	Portland Timbers	Burnaby, British Columbia Canada
19:00 (PDT)	Sebrango 54'; Nash 66'; Valente 90'	Report	9' S. Thompson	Stadium: Swangard Stadium; Attendance: 5,288 (SO); Referee: Jonathan Lavergne (Canada)

June 10, 2008 USOC 1st Rd	Portland Timbers	2–3	Hollywood United (USASA)	Portland, Oregon
19:00 (PDT)	Brown 32'; Oka 51'	Report	45' (pen.), 58' (pen.) Taylor; 90' Alexander	Stadium: PGE Park; Attendance: 3,089; Referee: Andres Pfefferkorn (USA)

June 12, 2008 USL-1	Portland Timbers	2–2	Atlanta Silverbacks	Portland, Oregon
19:00 (PDT)	Bagley 14'; Poltl (red card) 17'; J. Thompson 39'; S. Thompson (red card) 68'	Report	29' (o.g.) Guante; 88' Knox	Stadium: PGE Park; Attendance: 7,862; Referee: Jasen Anno (USA)

June 14, 2008 Friendly	Portland Timbers	1–0	Juventus Primavera	Portland, Oregon
19:00 (PDT)	Brown 24'	Report		Stadium: PGE Park; Attendance: 8,135; Referee: Kari Seitz (USA)

June 27, 2008 USL-1	Carolina RailHawks	1–0	Portland Timbers	Cary, North Carolina
17:00 (PDT)	Nuñez 4'	Report		Stadium: WakeMed Soccer Park; Attendance: 4,617; Referee: Tony Crush (USA)

June 28, 2008 USL-1	Atlanta Silverbacks	0–2	Portland Timbers	Atlanta
16:55 (PDT)		Report	3' Brown; 69' Bagley	Stadium: RE/MAX Greater Atlanta Stadium; Attendance: 2,417; Referee: Mark Kadlecik (USA)

=== July ===
July 3, 2008 Friendly	Portland Timbers	0–2	Monarcas Morelia	Portland, Oregon
19:00 (PDT)		Report	16' Landín; 27' Durán; (red card) 64' Romero	Stadium: PGE Park; Attendance: 11,932; Referee: Jair Marrufo (USA)

July 6, 2008 Friendly	Portland Timbers	1–3	Monarcas Morelia	Seattle
18:00 (PDT)	Nyassi 63'	Report	22' (pen.) Landín; 57' Guzmán; 64' Hernández	Stadium: Memorial Stadium

July 10, 2008 USL-1	Portland Timbers	0–2	Puerto Rico Islanders	Portland, Oregon
19:00 (PDT)		Report	38' Noël; 45' Hansen	Stadium: PGE Park; Attendance: 10,042; Referee: Jeremy Vehar (USA)

July 15, 2008 Friendly	Portland Timbers	2–0	Tigres UANL	Portland, Oregon
19:00 (PDT)	J. Thompson 52'; Alvarez 54'	Report		Stadium: PGE Park; Attendance: 8,375

July 18, 2008 USL-1	Atlanta Silverbacks	1–1	Portland Timbers	Atlanta
16:55 (PDT)	Buete 90'	Report	90' Olum	Stadium: RE/MAX Greater Atlanta Stadium; Attendance: 2,412; Referee: Hido Tica (USA)

July 19, 2008 USL-1	Charleston Battery	2–0	Portland Timbers	Charleston, South Carolina
16:30 (PDT)	Spicer 27'; Armstrong 32'	Report		Stadium: Blackbaud Stadium; Attendance: 3,742; Referee: Hilario Grajeda (USA)

July 24, 2008 USL-1	Portland Timbers	0–0	Carolina RailHawks	Portland, Oregon
19:00 (PDT)	Brown (red card) 42'	Report	(red card) 78' Stokes	Stadium: PGE Park; Attendance: 8,257; Referee: Andres Pfefferkorn (USA)

=== August ===
August 2, 2008 USL-1	Minnesota Thunder	2–2	Portland Timbers	Blaine, Minnesota
17:05 (PDT)	Sánchez 18' (pen.); Gonzalez 65'	Report	70' Guante; 75' (pen.) Jordan	Stadium: National Sports Center; Attendance: 3,318; Referee: Landis Wiley (USA)

August 7, 2008 USL-1 / CC	Portland Timbers	0–1	Seattle Sounders	Portland, Oregon
20:00 (PDT)	S. Thompson (red card) 33'	Report	20' Le Toux	Stadium: PGE Park; Attendance: 12,332; Referee: Jasen Anno (USA)

August 9, 2008 USL-1	Portland Timbers	1–1	Charleston Battery	Portland, Oregon
19:00 (PDT)	Jordan 12'	Report	69' Alavanja	Stadium: PGE Park; Attendance: 6,283; Referee: Alejandro Mariscal (USA)

August 16, 2008 USL-1	Portland Timbers	2–1	Montreal Impact	Portland, Oregon
19:00 (PDT)	Jordan 50'; Brown 69'	Report	86' Donatelli	Stadium: PGE Park; Attendance: 7,893; Referee: Edvin Jurisevic (USA)

August 22, 2008 USL-1 / CC	Vancouver Whitecaps	2–1	Portland Timbers	Burnaby, British Columbia Canada
20:00 (PDT)	Addlery 3', 43'	Report	12' Olum	Stadium: Swangard Stadium; Attendance: 4,761; Referee: Mathieu Bourdeau (Canada)

=== September ===
September 4, 2008 USL-1	Portland Timbers	4–0	Miami FC	Portland, Oregon
19:00 (PDT)	Alvarez 3'; Dunn 41'; Brown 48', 70' (pen.)	Report		Stadium: PGE Park; Attendance: 8,219; Referee: Richard Heron (USA)

September 6, 2008 USL-1	Rochester Rhinos	2–0	Portland Timbers	Rochester, New York
16:35 (PDT)	Delicâte 40'; Heins 87'	Report		Stadium: PAETEC Park; Attendance: 6,570; Referee: Javier Santos (PUR)

September 8, 2008 USL-1	Montreal Impact	2–0	Portland Timbers	Montreal Canada
16:30 (PDT)	Di Lorenzo 13'; Byers 45'	Report		Stadium: Saputo Stadium; Attendance: 12,246; Referee: Silviu Petrescu (Canada)

September 11, 2008 USL-1	Portland Timbers	1–2	Charleston Battery	Portland, Oregon
19:00 (PDT)	Higgins 14'; Dunn (red card) 39'	Report	73' Alavanja; 89' King	Stadium: PGE Park; Attendance: 13,050; Referee: Yader Reyes (USA)

September 20, 2008 USL-1	Carolina RailHawks	1–0	Portland Timbers	Cary, North Carolina
16:30 (PDT)	Nuñez 90'	Report	(red card) 70' Griffin	Stadium: WakeMed Soccer Park; Attendance: 3,878; Referee: Saeed Mohamed (USA)

== Competitions ==
=== USL First Division ===
==== Standings ====
Commissioner's Cup, bye to semifinal round of playoffs
First round of playoffs

Pos	Club	Pts	Pld	W	L	T	GF	GA	GD	H2H Pts
1	Puerto Rico Islanders	54	30	15	6	9	43	23	+20	
2	Vancouver Whitecaps	53	30	15	7	8	34	28	+6	
3	Montreal Impact	42	30	12	12	6	33	28	+5	
4	Rochester Rhinos	41^{†}	30	11	10	9	35	32	+3	
5	Charleston Battery	40	30	11	12	7	34	36	−2	CHA: 4 pts SEA: 4 pts
6	Seattle Sounders	40	30	10	10	10	37	36	+1	CHA: 4 pts SEA: 4 pts
7	Minnesota Thunder	39	30	10	11	9	40	38	+2	
8	Carolina RailHawks	37	30	9	11	10	34	43	−9	
9	Miami FC	34	30	8	12	10	28	34	−6	MIA: 7 pts ATL: 1 pt
10	Atlanta Silverbacks	34	30	8	12	10	37	50	−13	MIA: 7 pts ATL: 1 pt
11	Portland Timbers	31	30	7	13	10	26	33	−7	

Tie-breaker order: 1. Head-to-head points; 2. Total wins; 3. Goal difference; 4. Goals for; 5. Lottery
^{†} Rochester deducted 1 point for use of an ineligible player on August 10, 2008

==== Results summary ====
Overall								Home						Away					
Pld	Pts	W	L	T	GF	GA	GD	W	L	T	GF	GA	GD	W	L	T	GF	GA	GD
30	31	7	13	10	26	33	−7	5	5	5	15	13	+2	2	8	5	11	20	−9

Pld = Matches played; Pts = Points; W = Matches won; T = Matches tied; L = Matches lost; GF = Goals for; GA = Goals against; GD = Goal difference

==== Results by round ====
Round	1	2	3	4	5	6	7	8	9	10	11	12	13	14	15	16	17	18	19	20	21	22	23	24	25	26	27	28	29	30
Stadium	H	H	H	H	A	A	A	H	H	A	A	H	A	H	A	A	H	A	A	H	A	H	H	H	A	H	A	A	H	A
Result	W	W	W	T	T	T	T	L	L	W	L	T	L	T	L	W	L	T	L	T	T	L	T	W	L	W	L	L	L	L

A = Away; H = Home; W = Win; L = Loss; T = Tie

=== U.S. Open Cup ===
==== Cup bracket ====
First round
NPSL	Arizona Sahuaros	0
USL-1	Seattle Sounders (aet)	1
USL-1	Portland Timbers	2
USASA	Hollywood United	3

Second round
USL-1	Seattle Sounders	6
USASA	Hollywood United	0

Third round
USL-1	Seattle Sounders	2
MLS	Chivas USA	0

==== First round ====
June 10, 2008
19:00 (PDT)

Portland Timbers	2–3	Hollywood United (USASA)
Brown 32'; Oka 51'	Report	45' (pen.), 58' (pen.) Taylor; 90' Alexander

PGE Park
Attendance: 3,089
Referee: Andres Pfefferkorn

=== Cascadia Cup ===
2008
Team	Pts	Pld	W	L	D	GF	GA	GD
Vancouver Whitecaps	13	6	4	1	1	9	6	+3
Seattle Sounders	8	6	2	2	2	5	5	0
Portland Timbers	4	6	1	4	1	4	7	-3

== Club ==
=== Coaching staff ===
Position	Staff
Head coach	(New Zealand) Gavin Wilkinson
Assistant coach	(United States) Rod Underwood
Assistant coach	(United States) Jim Rilatt
Goalkeeper coach	(United States) Jim Brazeau

Updated to match played June 9, 2011

=== Management ===
Majority Owner & President	(United States) Merritt Paulson
General Manager	(New Zealand) Gavin Wilkinson
Ground (capacity and dimensions)	PGE Park ( / )

== Squad ==
=== Kits ===
The Timbers wore a green home kit, bearing white accents on the collar and sleeves, with green shorts and green socks. The away kit was white with white shorts and white socks. The third kit was a deep maroon color, called "Rose City Red", with maroon shorts and maroon socks.

Primary	Secondary	Third

=== Final roster ===
Note: Flags indicate national team as defined under FIFA eligibility rules; some limited exceptions apply. Players may hold more than one non-FIFA nationality.

No.	Pos.	Nation	Player
1	GK	USA	Jordan James
2	MF	USA	Miguel Guante
4	DF	USA	Tim Karalexis
5	DF	CAN	Justin Thompson
6	DF	NZL	Cameron Knowles
7	MF	USA	Shaun Higgins
8	MF	USA	Tom Poltl
9	MF	USA	Drue Harris
10	MF	CIV	Arsène Oka
11	FW	USA	Chris Brown
12	DF	USA	Leonard Griffin
13	FW	USA	Jamil Walker

No.	Pos.	Nation	Player
14	MF	USA	Neil Dombrowski
15	MF	KEN	Lawrence Olum
16	MF	SCO	Bryan Little
17	DF	USA	Scot Thompson
18	GK	USA	Steve Reese
19	MF	USA	Troy Ready
20	FW	SOL	Benjamin Totori
21	DF	USA	Cameron Dunn
23	FW	MEX	Byron Alvarez
30	DF	JPN	Takayuki Suzuki
32	GK	USA	Chase Harrison
33	FW	USA	Chris Bagley

=== Recognition ===
USL-1 All-League Second Team

Pos	Player	GP
DF	(New Zealand) Cameron Knowles	29

USL-1 Player of the Week

Week	Player	Opponent(s)	Ref
2	(Japan) Takayuki Suzuki	Minnesota Thunder, Seattle Sounders	

USL-1 Goal of the Week

Week	Player	Opponent	Ref
2	(Japan) Takayuki Suzuki	Seattle Sounders	
21	(Mexico) Byron Alvarez	Miami FC	

USL-1 Team of the Week

Week	Player	Opponent(s)	Ref
1	(United States) Chris Brown	Puerto Rico Islanders	
2	(United States) Ray Burse	Minnesota Thunder, Seattle Sounders	
2	(United States) Shaun Higgins	Minnesota Thunder, Seattle Sounders	
2	(United States) Scot Thompson	Minnesota Thunder, Seattle Sounders	
2	(Japan) Takayuki Suzuki	Minnesota Thunder, Seattle Sounders	
4	(New Zealand) Cameron Knowles	Rochester Rhinos, Seattle Sounders	
5	(New Zealand) Cameron Knowles	Puerto Rico Islanders, Miami FC	
5	(Scotland) Bryan Little	Puerto Rico Islanders, Miami FC	
7	(United States) Miguel Guante	Montreal Impact	
8	(United States) Leonard Griffin	Minnesota Thunder, Vancouver Whitecaps	
9	(United States) Justin Thompson	Atlanta Silverbacks	
11	(United States) Chris Brown	Carolina RailHawks, Atlanta Silverbacks	
14	(Kenya) Lawrence Olum	Atlanta Silverbacks, Charleston Battery	
15	(United States) Brad Knighton	Carolina RailHawks	
15	(New Zealand) Cameron Knowles	Carolina RailHawks	
16	(United States) Bryan Jordan	Minnesota Thunder	
17	(United States) Bryan Jordan	Seattle Sounders, Charleston Battery	
18	(United States) Bryan Jordan	Montreal Impact	
18	(United States) Scot Thompson	Montreal Impact	
21	(United States) Chris Brown	Miami FC, Rochester Rhinos, Montreal Impact	

=== Statistics ===
==== Appearances and goals ====
All players contracted or loaned to the club during the season included.

No.	Pos	Nat	Player	Total		USL-1		U.S. Open Cup	
No.	Pos	Nat	Player	Apps	Goals	Apps	Goals	Apps	Goals
1	GK	(United States) USA	Jordan James	4	0	3+0	0	1+0	0
2	MF	(United States) USA	Miguel Guante	29	2	20+8	2	0+1	0
4	DF	(United States) USA	Tim Karalexis	11	0	3+7	0	1+0	0
5	DF	(Canada) CAN	Justin Thompson	25	2	22+2	2	1+0	0
6	DF	(New Zealand) NZL	Cameron Knowles	29	0	29+0	0	0+0	0
7	MF	(United States) USA	Shaun Higgins	28	2	26+2	2	0+0	0
8	MF	(United States) USA	Tom Poltl	25	0	22+3	0	0+0	0
9	MF	(United States) USA	Kiki Lara	7	0	1+5	0	1+0	0
10	MF	(Ivory Coast) CIV	Arsène Oka	8	1	2+5	0	1+0	1
11	FW	(United States) USA	Chris Brown	28	9	27+0	8	1+0	1
12	DF	(United States) USA	Leonard Griffin	30	0	28+1	0	1+0	0
13	FW	(United States) USA	Jamil Walker	12	0	1+11	0	0+0	0
(13)	MF	(United States) USA	Andrew Gregor (traded to (United States) Rochester Rhinos)	13	0	12+1	0	0+0	0
14	MF	(United States) USA	Neil Dombrowski	14	0	8+5	0	1+0	0
15	MF	(Kenya) KEN	Lawrence Olum	24	3	14+10	3	0+0	0
16	MF	(Scotland) SCO	Bryan Little	18	0	5+12	0	1+0	0
17	DF	(United States) USA	Scot Thompson	27	1	27+0	1	0+0	0
18	GK	(United States) USA	Steve Reese	0	0	0+0	0	0+0	0
19	MF	(United States) USA	Troy Ready	0	0	0+0	0	0+0	0
20	FW	(Solomon Islands) SOL	Benjamin Totori	3	0	0+3	0	0+0	0
21	DF	(United States) USA	Cameron Dunn	7	1	6+1	1	0+0	0
(22)	GK	(United States) USA	Brad Knighton (2 month loan from (United States) New England Revolution)	8	0	8+0	0	0+0	0
(22)	MF	(England) ENG	Tom Taylor (released)	0	0	0+0	0	0+0	0
23	FW	(Mexico) MEX	Byron Alvarez	9	1	7+2	1	0+0	0
(23)	GK	(United States) USA	Ray Burse (3 month loan from (United States) FC Dallas)	13	0	13+0	0	0+0	0
(24)	DF	(Armenia) ARM	Vardan Adzemian (4 month loan from (United States) Los Angeles Galaxy)	0	0	0+0	0	0+0	0
(25)	DF	(United States) USA	Scott Bolkan (4 month loan from (United States) Los Angeles Galaxy)	1	0	0+0	0	1+0	0
(26)	FW	(United States) USA	Bryan Jordan (3 short-term loans from (United States) Los Angeles Galaxy)	9	3	8+1	3	0+0	0
30	FW	(Japan) JPN	Takayuki Suzuki	27	1	21+5	1	0+1	0
32	GK	(United States) USA	Chase Harrison	6	0	6+0	0	0+0	0
33	FW	(United States) USA	Chris Bagley	27	2	11+15	2	1+0	0

==== Top scorers ====
Players with 1 goal or more included only.

Rk.	Nat.	Position	Player	Total	USL-1	U.S. Open Cup
1	(United States)	FW	Chris Brown	9	8	1
2	(United States)	FW	Bryan Jordan	3	3	0
2	(Kenya)	MF	Lawrence Olum	3	3	0
4	(United States)	FW	Chris Bagley	2	2	0
4	(United States)	MF	Miguel Guante	2	2	0
4	(United States)	MF	Shaun Higgins	2	2	0
4	(Canada)	DF	Justin Thompson	2	2	0
8	(Mexico)	FW	Byron Alvarez	1	1	0
8	(United States)	DF	Cameron Dunn	1	1	0
8	(Japan)	FW	Takayuki Suzuki	1	1	0
8	(United States)	DF	Scot Thompson	1	1	0
8	(Ivory Coast)	MF	Arsène Oka	1	0	1
			TOTALS	28	26	2

==== Disciplinary record ====
Players with 1 card or more included only.

No.	Nat.	Position	Player	Total		USL-1		U.S. Open Cup	
No.	Nat.	Position	Player	Booked	Sent off (straight red)	Booked	Sent off (straight red)	Booked	Sent off (straight red)
2	(United States)	MF	Miguel Guante	3	0	2	0	1	0
5	(Canada)	DF	Justin Thompson	7	0	6	0	1	0
6	(New Zealand)	DF	Cameron Knowles	6	0	6	0	0	0
7	(United States)	MF	Shaun Higgins	7	0	7	0	0	0
8	(United States)	MF	Tom Poltl	4	1	4	1	0	0
10	(Ivory Coast)	MF	Arsène Oka	1	0	0	0	1	0
11	(United States)	FW	Chris Brown	2	1	1	1	1	0
12	(United States)	DF	Leonard Griffin	5	1	5	1	0	0
13	(United States)	FW	Jamil Walker	1	0	1	0	0	0
(13)	(United States)	MF	Andrew Gregor	4	0	4	0	0	0
14	(United States)	MF	Neil Dombrowski	1	0	1	0	0	0
15	(Kenya)	MF	Lawrence Olum	2	0	2	0	0	0
16	(Scotland)	MF	Bryan Little	2	0	1	0	1	0
17	(United States)	DF	Scot Thompson	4	2	4	2	0	0
21	(United States)	DF	Cameron Dunn	0	1	0	1	0	0
23	(Mexico)	FW	Byron Alvarez	2	0	2	0	0	0
(23)	(United States)	GK	Ray Burse	1	0	1	0	0	0
(26)	(United States)	FW	Bryan Jordan	2	0	2	0	0	0
30	(Japan)	FW	Takayuki Suzuki	8	1	8	1	0	0
33	(United States)	FW	Chris Bagley	2	0	2	0	0	0
			TOTALS	64	7	59	7	5	0

==== Goalkeeper stats ====
All goalkeepers included.

No.	Nat.	Player	Total				USL-1				U.S. Open Cup			
No.	Nat.	Player	MIN	GA	GAA	SV	MIN	GA	GAA	SV	MIN	GA	GAA	SV
1	(United States)	Jordan James	360	8	2.00	15	270	5	1.67	11	90	3	3.00	4
18	(United States)	Steve Reese	0	0	—	0	0	0	—	0	0	0	—	0
(22)	(United States)	Brad Knighton	720	10	1.25	27	720	10	1.25	27	0	0	—	0
(23)	(United States)	Ray Burse	1170	9	0.69	50	1170	9	0.69	50	0	0	—	0
32	(United States)	Chase Harrison	540	9	1.76	13	540	9	1.76	13	0	0	—	0
		TOTALS	2790	36	1.16	105	2700	33	1.10	101	90	3	3.00	4

=== Player movement ===
==== Transfers in ====
Date	Player	Position	Previous club	Fee/notes	Ref
December 5, 2007	(United States) Tim Karalexis	DF	(United States) Charleston Battery	Acquired in exchange for Luke Kreamalmeyer	
December 18, 2007	(United States) Miguel Guante	MF	(United States) Miami FC	Free	
January 18, 2008	(United States) Chris Brown	FW	(United States) Real Salt Lake	Free	
February 28, 2008	(United States) Jordan James	GK	(United States) Houston Dynamo	Free	
March 7, 2008	(Ivory Coast) Arsène Oka	MF	(United States) New England Revolution	Free	
March 28, 2008	(Japan) Takayuki Suzuki	FW	(Japan) Yokohama F. Marinos	Free	
April 15, 2008	(United States) Leonard Griffin	DF	(United States) Columbus Crew	Free	
April 16, 2008	(Scotland) Bryan Little	MF	(New Zealand) Auckland City	Free	
April 17, 2008	(Solomon Islands) Benjamin Totori	FW	(New Zealand) Waitakere United	Free	
May 6, 2008	(United States) Steve Reese	GK	(United States) Portland Timbers	Free	
May 6, 2008	(England) Tom Taylor	MF	(United States) Portland Timbers	Free	
July 9, 2008	(United States) Chase Harrison	GK	(United States) Rochester Rhinos	Acquired with Jamil Walker in exchange for Andrew Gregor	
July 9, 2008	(United States) Jamil Walker	FW	(United States) Carolina RailHawks	Acquired with Chase Harrison in exchange for Andrew Gregor	
July 22, 2008	(Mexico) Byron Alvarez	FW	(United States) Charleston Battery	Free	
August 1, 2008	(United States) Cameron Dunn	DF	(United States) Hollywood United	Free	

==== Loans in ====
Date	Player	Position	Loaned from	Fee/notes	Ref
April 7, 2008	(United States) Ray Burse	GK	(United States) FC Dallas	Season-long loan with option to recall; recalled by FC Dallas on July 2, 2008	
April 14, 2008	(Armenia) Vardan Adzemian	DF	(United States) Los Angeles Galaxy	Season-long loan with option to recall; recalled by Los Angeles Galaxy on August 1, 2011	
April 14, 2008	(United States) Scott Bolkan	DF	(United States) Los Angeles Galaxy	Season-long loan with option to recall; recalled by Los Angeles Galaxy on August 1, 2011	
June 4, 2008	(United States) Bryan Jordan	FW	(United States) Los Angeles Galaxy	Short-term loan; returned to Los Angeles Galaxy after 2 games	
June 27, 2008	(United States) Bryan Jordan	FW	(United States) Los Angeles Galaxy	Short-term loan; returned to Los Angeles Galaxy after 2 games	
July 2, 2008	(United States) Brad Knighton	GK	(United States) New England Revolution	Season-long loan with option to recall; recalled by New England Revolution on August 22, 2011	
July 30, 2008	(United States) Bryan Jordan	FW	(United States) Los Angeles Galaxy	Season-long loan with option to recall; recalled by Los Angeles Galaxy on September 3, 2011	

==== Transfers out ====
Date	Player	Position	Destination club	Fee/notes	Ref
End of 2007 season	(United States) Jaime Ambriz	FW	N/A	Contract expired and not re-signed	
End of 2007 season	(United States) Bayard Elfvin	GK	N/A	Contract expired and not re-signed	
End of 2007 season	(England) David Hague	FW	N/A	Contract expired and not re-signed	
End of 2007 season	(United States) Luc Harrington	FW	N/A	Contract expired and not re-signed	
End of 2007 season	(United States) Garrett Marcum	DF	N/A	Contract expired and not re-signed	
End of 2007 season	(United States) Lee Morrison	DF	N/A	Contract expired and not re-signed	
End of 2007 season	(United States) Matt Taylor	FW	N/A	Contract expired and not re-signed	
December 5, 2007	(United States) Luke Kreamalmeyer	MF	(United States) Charleston Battery	Traded for Tim Karalexis	
December 5, 2007	(United States) Kevin Meissner	DF	Unattached	Released	
January 17, 2008	(England) Tom Taylor	MF	Unattached	Released	
March 25, 2008	(United States) Josh Wicks	GK	(United States) Los Angeles Galaxy	Undisclosed	
March 25, 2008	(United States) Bryan Jordan	FW	(United States) Los Angeles Galaxy	Undisclosed	
June 25, 2008	(England) Tom Taylor	MF	Unattached	Released	
July 9, 2008	(United States) Andrew Gregor	MF	(United States) Rochester Rhinos	Traded for Chase Harrison and Jamil Walker	
