= 2007 Portland Timbers season =

Portland Timbers
2007 season
- President: Jack Cain (interim; to May 22); Merritt Paulson (from May 22)
- Head coach: Gavin Wilkinson
- Stadium: PGE Park; Portland, Oregon
- USL-1: League: 2nd Playoffs: Semifinals
- U.S. Open Cup: Second round
- Cascadia Cup: 3rd
- Top goalscorer: League: Andrew Gregor (8 goals); All: Andrew Gregor (9 goals)
- Highest home attendance: 15,833 vs. CHA (Aug 23)
- Lowest home attendance: 3,041 vs. ROC (May 13)
- Average home league attendance: League: 6,828; All: 7,244
Primary colors	Secondary colors	Third colors

The 2007 Portland Timbers season was the 7th season for the Portland Timbers—the 3rd incarnation of a club to bear the Timbers name—of the now-defunct USL First Division, the second-tier league of the United States and Canada at the time.

== Preseason ==
April 13, 2007	Portland Pilots (NCAA)	1–2	Portland Timbers	Portland, Oregon
19:00 (PDT)	Knowles 5' (o.g.)	Report	60' Marcum (?) Hague	Stadium: Merlo Field

April 15, 2007 Preseason Cup	Portland Timbers	0–0 (5–4 p)	Vancouver Whitecaps	Milwaukie, Oregon
16:00 (PDT)		Report		Stadium: Alder Creek Middle School
	Penalties
	Gregor (penalty scored); Bagley (penalty scored); Griffin (penalty scored); Kreamalmeyer (penalty missed); Harrington (penalty scored); Morrison (penalty scored)		(penalty scored) Gjertsen; (penalty missed) Cann; (penalty scored) McLaughlin; (penalty scored) Montz; (penalty scored) Smith; (penalty missed) Johnston

== Regular season ==
=== April ===
April 17, 2007 USL-1	Portland Timbers	3–1	Puerto Rico Islanders	Portland, Oregon
19:00 (PDT)	Gregor 2', 86'; Kreamalmeyer 53'	Report	83' Zapata	Stadium: PGE Park; Attendance: 7,805; Referee: Yader Reyes (USA)

=== May ===
May 5, 2007 USL-1	Seattle Sounders	1–0	Portland Timbers	Seattle
19:00 (PDT)	Knox 20'	Report		Stadium: Qwest Field; Attendance: 8,247; Referee: Ian Anderson (USA)

May 9, 2007 Friendly	Portland Timbers	1–0	Necaxa Elite	Portland, Oregon
19:00 (PDT)	Jordan 46'	Report		Stadium: PGE Park; Attendance: 7,761; Referee: Brian Hall (USA)

May 11, 2007 USL-1 / CC	Portland Timbers	2–2	Seattle Sounders	Portland, Oregon
20:00 (PDT)	Jordan 78'; Gregor 87' (pen.)	Report	8' Le Toux; 77' Levesque	Stadium: PGE Park; Attendance: 5,722; Referee: Alejandro Mariscal (USA)

May 13, 2007 USL-1	Portland Timbers	2–0	Rochester Raging Rhinos	Portland, Oregon
18:00 (PDT)	Gregor 24'; Griffin 32'	Report	(red card) 90' Bonseu	Stadium: PGE Park; Attendance: 3,041; Referee: Colin Tate (USA)

May 25, 2007 USL-1	Portland Timbers	2–0	California Victory	Portland, Oregon
19:00 (PDT)	S. Thompson 10'; Jordan 55'	Report	(red card) 77' Herron	Stadium: PGE Park; Attendance: 4,795; Referee: Fotis Bazakos (USA)

May 27, 2007 USL-1	Portland Timbers	0–0	Carolina RailHawks	Portland, Oregon
18:00 (PDT)		Report	(red card) 38' Steele	Stadium: PGE Park; Attendance: 5,026; Referee: Keri Seitz (USA)

=== June ===
June 2, 2007 Friendly	OUSA U-23 (USASA)	1–2	Portland Timbers	Eugene, Oregon
17:00 (PDT)	(?)	Report	(?) Ambriz (?) Lara	Stadium: Sheldon High School

June 8, 2007 USL-1	Montreal Impact	0–1	Portland Timbers	Montréal, Québec Canada
17:00 (PDT)		Report	75' (pen.) Gregor	Stadium: Complexe sportif Claude-Robillard; Attendance: 11,286; Referee: Paul Ward (Canada)

June 9, 2007 USL-1	Rochester Raging Rhinos	2–1	Portland Timbers	Rochester, New York
16:35 (PDT)	Lines 4'; Delicâte 28'	Report	41' Griffin	Stadium: PAETEC Park; Attendance: 10,042; Referee: Richard Sanchez (USA)

June 12, 2007 USOC 1st Rd	Bakersfield Brigade (PDL)	0–2	Portland Timbers	Bakersfield, California
16:30 (PDT)		Report	4' Olum; 18' Harrington	Stadium: Bakersfield Christian High School; Attendance: 1,500; Referee: Miguel Chicas (USA)

June 19, 2007 Friendly	Portland Timbers	1–1 (4–1 p)	A.C. Milan Primavera	Portland, Oregon
19:00 (PDT)	T. Taylor 24'; Gregor (red card) 56'	Report	66' Travaini	Stadium: PGE Park; Attendance: 11,092; Referee: Alejandro Mariscal (USA)
	Penalties
	Griffin (penalty scored); Harrington (penalty scored); Lara (penalty scored); Morrison (penalty scored)		(penalty missed) Guerci; (penalty missed) Cattelan; (penalty scored) Rampinini

June 21, 2007 USL-1	Portland Timbers	1–1	Montreal Impact	Portland, Oregon
19:00 (PDT)	Dombrowski 85'	Report	86' Marcina	Stadium: PGE Park; Attendance: 5,266; Referee: Colin Arblaster (USA)

June 26, 2007 USOC 2nd Rd	Seattle Sounders	2–1	Portland Timbers	Tukwila, Washington
19:00 (PDT)	Alcaraz-Cuellar 41'; Besagno 70'	Report	19' J. Thompson; (red card) 40' Knowles	Stadium: Starfire Sports Complex; Attendance: 711; Referee: Hidajet Tica (USA)

June 28, 2007 USL-1	California Victory	0–1	Portland Timbers	San Francisco, California
19:00 (PDT)		Report	89' Hague	Stadium: Kezar Stadium; Attendance: 845; Referee: Yader Reyes (USA)

June 30, 2007 USL-1	Portland Timbers	1–0	Miami FC	Portland, Oregon
19:00 (PDT)	Olum 90'	Report		Stadium: PGE Park; Attendance: 6,296; Referee: Óscar Ortiz (USA)

=== July ===
July 7, 2007 USL-1	California Victory	0–3	Portland Timbers	San Francisco, California
19:00 (PDT)		Report	11' Gregor; 17' Jordan; 20' Knowles	Stadium: Kezar Stadium; Attendance: 1,396; Referee: Ian Anderson (USA)

July 13, 2007 USL-1	Portland Timbers	1–0	California Victory	Portland, Oregon
20:00 (PDT)	Jordan 52'	Report		Stadium: PGE Park; Attendance: 6,332; Referee: Andres Pfefferkorn (USA)

July 15, 2007 USL-1	Portland Timbers	4–1	California Victory	Portland, Oregon
18:00 (PDT)	Knowles 32'; Hague 68', 74', 88'	Report	17' Bianchi; (red card) 54' Sánchez	Stadium: PGE Park; Attendance: 4,813; Referee: Hidajet Tica (USA)

July 19, 2007 USL-1	Portland Timbers	2–1	Vancouver Whitecaps	Portland, Oregon
19:00 (PDT)	Gregor 29'; Olum 52'	Report	18' Nash	Stadium: PGE Park; Attendance: 7,123; Referee: Collin Arblaster (USA)

July 21, 2007 USL-1	Atlanta Silverbacks	0–1	Portland Timbers	Atlanta
16:55 (PDT)		Report	65' Bagley	Stadium: RE/MAX Greater Atlanta Stadium; Attendance: 2,264; Referee: Lee Suckle (USA)

July 22, 2007 USL-1	Charleston Battery	2–0	Portland Timbers	Charleston, South Carolina
15:00 (PDT)	Alvarez 26'; Vercollone 75'	Report	(red card) 66' Jordan	Stadium: Blackbaud Stadium; Attendance: 3,647; Referee: Erich Simmons (USA)

July 26, 2007 USL-1	Portland Timbers	0–0	Atlanta Silverbacks	Portland, Oregon
19:00 (PDT)		Report		Stadium: PGE Park; Attendance: 6,598; Referee: Alejandro Mariscal (USA)

July 28, 2007 Friendly	Portland Timbers	2–1	Preston North End	Portland, Oregon
19:00 (PDT)	M. Taylor 50', 90' (pen.)	Report	12' Ormerod	Stadium: PGE Park; Attendance: 8,238; Referee: Andres Pfefferkorn (USA)

=== August ===
August 1, 2007 USL-1 / CC	Seattle Sounders	2–0	Portland Timbers	Seattle
19:00 (PDT)	Gardner 32'; Le Toux 68'	Report		Stadium: Qwest Field; Attendance: 3,287; Referee: Fotis Bazakos (USA)

August 4, 2007 USL-1	Minnesota Thunder	1–1	Portland Timbers	Saint Paul, Minnesota
17:05 (PDT)	Spicer 46'	Report	63' Olum	Stadium: James Griffin Stadium; Attendance: 1,248; Referee: Rizal Milliken (USA)

August 9, 2007 USL-1	Portland Timbers	0–0	Minnesota Thunder	Portland, Oregon
19:00 (PDT)		Report		Stadium: PGE Park; Attendance: 8,290; Referee: Óscar Ortiz (USA)

August 11, 2007 USL-1 / CC	Portland Timbers	0–0	Vancouver Whitecaps	Portland, Oregon
19:00 (PDT)		Report	(red card) 26' Kindel	Stadium: PGE Park; Attendance: 8,652; Referee: Ian Anderson (USA)

August 16, 2007 USL-1	Minnesota Thunder	2–2	Portland Timbers	Saint Paul, Minnesota
17:05 (PDT)	Toure 11' (pen.); Friedland 78' (pen.)	Report	22' M. Taylor; 87' Ambriz	Stadium: James Griffin Stadium; Attendance: 3,276; Referee: Fotis Bazakos (USA)

August 23, 2007 USL-1	Portland Timbers	1–0	Charleston Battery	Portland, Oregon
19:00 (PDT)	J. Thompson 79'	Report	(red card) 90' Curran	Stadium: PGE Park; Attendance: 15,833; Referee: Colin Arblaster (USA)

August 25, 2007 USL-1	Miami FC	1–2	Portland Timbers	Olympia Heights, Florida
17:00 (PDT)	Jean-Jacques 68'	Report	22' (pen.) Gregor; 74' S. Thompson	Stadium: Tropical Park Stadium; Attendance: 1,250; Referee: Shane Moody (USA)

August 26, 2007 USL-1	Puerto Rico Islanders	1–0	Portland Timbers	Bayamón PUR
15:00 (PDT)	Atieno 56'	Report		Stadium: Juan Ramón Loubriel Stadium; Attendance: 7,341; Referee: Anthony Russo (USA)

=== September ===
September 1, 2007 USL-1	Carolina RailHawks	0–1	Portland Timbers	Cary, North Carolina
16:30 (PDT)		Report	80' Jordan	Stadium: SAS Soccer Park; Attendance: 6,545; Referee: Tony Delois (USA)

September 9, 2007 USL-1 / CC	Vancouver Whitecaps	0–0	Portland Timbers	Burnaby, British Columbia Canada
16:00 (PDT)		Report		Stadium: Swangard Stadium; Attendance: 5,389 (SO); Referee: Silviu Petrescu (Canada)

== Postseason ==
September 14, 2007 QF Leg 1	Vancouver Whitecaps	1–0	Portland Timbers	Burnaby, British Columbia Canada
19:00 (PDT)	Jordan 76'	Report		Stadium: Swangard Stadium; Attendance: 4,761; Referee: Dave Gantar (Canada)

September 16, 2007 QF Leg 2	Portland Timbers	3–0 (3–1 agg.)	Vancouver Whitecaps	Portland, Oregon
17:00 (PDT)	J. Thompson 27'; Gregor 70'; Ambriz 82'	Report		Stadium: PGE Park; Attendance: 8,522; Referee: Jair Marrufo (USA)

September 21, 2007 SF Leg 1	Atlanta Silverbacks	1–1	Portland Timbers	Atlanta
17:00 (PDT)	Ukah 43'	Report	49' Jordan	Stadium: RE/MAX Greater Atlanta Stadium; Attendance: 2,792; Referee: William Delois (USA)

September 23, 2007 SF Leg 2	Portland Timbers	0–0 (a.e.t.) (1–1 agg.) (1–3 p)	Atlanta Silverbacks	Portland, Oregon
17:00 (PDT)		Report		Stadium: PGE Park; Attendance: 11,789; Referee: Terry Vaughn (USA)
	Penalties
	Gregor (penalty missed); Griffin (penalty scored); Kreamalmeyer (penalty missed); Olum (penalty missed)		(penalty missed) Ríos; (penalty scored) Rivillo; (penalty scored) Kandji; (penalty scored) Ukah

October 28, 2007 Friendly	Portland Timbers	4–1	Toronto FC (MLS)	Portland, Oregon
14:00 (PDT)	Jordan 19', 20'; Guante 43'; Olum 77'	Report	25' Pozniak	Stadium: PGE Park; Attendance: 6,614; Referee: Jorge Oconitrillo (USA)

== Competitions ==
=== USL First Division ===
==== Standings ====
Commissioner's Cup, quarterfinal round of playoffs
Quarterfinal round of playoffs

Pos	Club	Pts	Pld	W	L	T	GF	GA	GD
1	Seattle Sounders	54	28	16	6	6	37	23	+14
2	Portland Timbers	51	28	14	5	9	32	18	+14
3	Montreal Impact	50	28	14	6	8	32	21	+11
4	Atlanta Silverbacks	43	28	12	9	7	40	30	+10
5	Rochester Raging Rhinos	42	28	12	10	6	39	36	+3
6	Puerto Rico Islanders	40	28	10	8	10	35	34	+1
7	Vancouver Whitecaps	39	28	9	7	12	27	24	+3
8	Carolina RailHawks	32	28	8	12	8	24	34	−10
9	Miami FC	31	28	9	15	4	31	41	−10
10	Charleston Battery	30	28	8	14	6	32	39	−7
11	Minnesota Thunder	26	28	5	12	11	32	35	−3
12	California Victory	19	28	4	17	7	17	43	−26

==== Results summary ====
Overall								Home						Away					
Pld	Pts	W	L	T	GF	GA	GD	W	L	T	GF	GA	GD	W	L	T	GF	GA	GD
28	51	14	5	9	32	18	+14	8	0	6	19	6	+13	6	5	3	13	12	+1

Pld = Matches played; Pts = Points; W = Matches won; T = Matches tied; L = Matches lost; GF = Goals for; GA = Goals against; GD = Goal difference

==== Results by round ====
Round	1	2	3	4	5	6	7	8	9	10	11	12	13	14	15	16	17	18	19	20	21	22	23	24	25	26	27	28
Stadium	H	A	H	H	H	H	A	A	H	A	H	A	H	H	H	A	A	H	A	A	H	H	A	H	A	A	A	A
Result	W	L	T	W	W	T	W	L	T	W	W	W	W	W	W	W	L	T	L	T	T	T	T	W	W	L	W	T

A = Away; H = Home; W = Win; L = Loss; T = Tie

=== USL-1 Playoffs ===
==== Playoff bracket ====
Each round except the final was a two-game aggregate goal series decided by extra time and a penalty shoot-out immediately following the second game of the series, if necessary. The away goals rule was not used as a tie-breaker. Tournament was re-seeded after the quarterfinals.

Quarterfinals
1	Seattle Sounders	2	1	3
8	Carolina RailHawks	0	0	0
4	Montreal Impact	3	0	3
5	Puerto Rico Islanders	2	3	5
2	Atlanta Silverbacks	2	1	3
7	Rochester Raging Rhinos	1	1	2
3	Portland Timbers	0	3	3
6	Vancouver Whitecaps	1	0	1

Semifinals
Seattle Sounders (aet) (p)	2	1	3 (4)
Puerto Rico Islanders	1	2	3 (2)
Atlanta Silverbacks (aet) (p)	1	0	1 (3)
Portland Timbers	1	0	1 (1)

Final
Seattle Sounders
Atlanta Silverbacks

==== Quarterfinals ====
September 14, 2007
19:00 (PDT)
Leg 1

Vancouver Whitecaps	1–0	Portland Timbers
Jordan 76'	Report

Swangard Stadium
Attendance: 4,761
Referee: Dave Gantar (Canada)

September 16, 2007
17:00 (PDT)
Leg 2

Portland Timbers	3–0	Vancouver Whitecaps
J. Thompson 27'; Gregor 70'; Ambriz 82'	Report

PGE Park
Attendance: 8,522
Referee: Jair Marrufo (USA)

==== Semifinals ====
September 21, 2007
17:00 (PDT)
Leg 1

Atlanta Silverbacks	1–1	Portland Timbers
Ukah 43'	Report	49' Jordan

RE/MAX Greater Atlanta Stadium
Attendance: 2,792
Referee: William Delois (USA)

September 23, 2007
17:00 (PDT)
Leg 2

Portland Timbers	0–0 (a.e.t.)	Atlanta Silverbacks
	Report
Penalties
Gregor (penalty missed); Griffin (penalty scored); Kreamalmeyer (penalty missed); Olum (penalty missed)	1–3	(penalty missed) Ríos; (penalty scored) Rivillo; (penalty scored) Kandji; (penalty scored) Ukah

PGE Park
Attendance: 11,789
Referee: Terry Vaughn (USA)

=== U.S. Open Cup ===
==== Cup bracket ====
First round
USL-1	Seattle Sounders	4
USASA	Banat Arsenal	1
PDL	Bakersfield Brigade	0
USL-1	Portland Timbers	2

Second round
USL-1	Seattle Sounders	2
USL-1	Portland Timbers	1

Third round
USL-1	Seattle Sounders	3
MLS	Chivas USA	1

==== First round ====
June 12, 2007
16:30 (PDT)

Bakersfield Brigade (PDL)	0–2	Portland Timbers
	Report	4' Olum; 18' Harrington

Bakersfield Christian High School
Attendance: 1,500
Referee: Miguel Chicas

==== Second round ====
June 26, 2007
19:00 (PDT)

Seattle Sounders	2–1	Portland Timbers
Alcaraz-Cuellar 41'; Besagno 70'	Report	19' J. Thompson; (red card) 40' Knowles

Starfire Sports Complex
Attendance: 711
Referee: Hidajet Tica

=== Cascadia Cup ===
2007
Team	Pts	Pld	W	L	D	GF	GA	GD
Seattle Sounders	8	4	2	0	2	7	4	+3
Vancouver Whitecaps	3	4	0	1	3	2	3	-1
Portland Timbers	3	4	0	1	3	2	4	-2

== Club ==
=== Coaching staff ===
Position	Staff
Head coach	(New Zealand) Gavin Wilkinson
Assistant coach	(United States) Rod Underwood
Assistant coach	(United States) Jim Rilatt
Goalkeeper coach	(United States) Jim Brazeau

=== Management ===
Majority Owner	(Iran) Abe Alizadeh (to May 22) (United States) Merritt Paulson (from May 22)
President	(United States) Jack Cain (interim; to May 22) (United States) Merritt Paulson (from May 22)
General Manager	(New Zealand) Gavin Wilkinson
Ground (capacity and dimensions)	PGE Park ( / )

=== Staff recognition ===
USL-1 Coach of the Year

Coach	W	L	T	League	Playoffs
(New Zealand) Gavin Wilkinson	14	5	9	2nd	Semifinals

== Squad ==
=== Kits ===
Primary	Secondary	Third

=== Final roster ===
Note: Flags indicate national team as defined under FIFA eligibility rules; some limited exceptions apply. Players may hold more than one non-FIFA nationality.

No.	Pos.	Nation	Player
1	GK	USA	Bayard Elfvin
2	DF	USA	Kevin Meissner
4	DF	USA	Lee Morrison
5	DF	CAN	Justin Thompson
6	DF	NZL	Cameron Knowles
7	MF	USA	Shaun Higgins
8	MF	USA	Tom Poltl
9	MF	USA	Kiki Lara
10	MF	USA	Luke Kreamalmeyer
11	FW	USA	Luc Harrington
12	DF	USA	Leonard Griffin
13	MF	USA	Andrew Gregor (captain)
14	MF	USA	Neil Dombrowski

No.	Pos.	Nation	Player
15	MF	KEN	Lawrence Olum
16	GK	USA	Steve Reese
17	DF	USA	Scot Thompson
18	MF	ENG	Tom Taylor
19	MF	USA	Troy Ready
20	FW	USA	Matt Taylor
21	DF	USA	Garrett Marcum
22	FW	USA	Jaime Ambriz
23	GK	USA	Josh Wicks
25	FW	ENG	David Hague
26	FW	USA	Bryan Jordan
33	FW	USA	Chris Bagley

=== Player recognition ===
USL-1 Goalkeeper of the Year

Player	GP	SV
(United States) Josh Wicks	27	87

USL-1 GAA Champion

Player	MIN	GA	GAA
(United States) Josh Wicks	2385	16	0.60

USL-1 All-League First Team

Pos	Player	GP
GK	(United States) Josh Wicks	27
DF	(New Zealand) Cameron Knowles	28
MF	(United States) Andrew Gregor	24

USL-1 All-League Second Team

Pos	Player	GP
DF	(United States) Scot Thompson	27

USL-1 Player of the Week

Week	Player	Opponent(s)	Ref
4	(United States) Andrew Gregor	Seattle Sounders, Rochester Raging Rhinos	
11	(United States) Josh Wicks	California Victory, Miami FC	
13	(England) David Hague	California Victory (x2)	

USL-1 Goal of the Week

Week	Player	Opponent	Ref
4	(United States) Leonard Griffin	Rochester Raging Rhinos	
19	(Canada) Justin Thompson	Charleston Battery	

USL-1 Team of the Week

Week	Player	Opponent(s)	Ref
1	(United States) Andrew Gregor	Puerto Rico Islanders	
4	(United States) Andrew Gregor	Seattle Sounders, Rochester Raging Rhinos	
4	(United States) Leonard Griffin	Seattle Sounders, Rochester Raging Rhinos	
4	(United States) Bryan Jordan	Seattle Sounders, Rochester Raging Rhinos	
6	(United States) Bryan Jordan	California Victory, Carolina RailHawks	
6	(United States) Scot Thompson	California Victory, Carolina RailHawks	
8	(New Zealand) Cameron Knowles	Montreal Impact, Rochester Raging Rhinos	
10	(United States) Neil Dombrowski	Montreal Impact	
11	(United States) Andrew Gregor	California Victory, Miami FC	
11	(United States) Josh Wicks	California Victory, Miami FC	
12	(United States) Andrew Gregor	California Victory	
13	(England) David Hague	California Victory (x2)	
13	(United States) Scot Thompson	California Victory (x2)	
14	(United States) Chris Bagley	Vancouver Whitecaps, Atlanta Silverbacks, Charleston Battery	
14	(United States) Tom Poltl	Vancouver Whitecaps, Atlanta Silverbacks, Charleston Battery	
15	(Canada) Justin Thompson	Atlanta Silverbacks	
16	(Kenya) Lawrence Olum	Seattle Sounders, Minnesota Thunder	
18	(United States) Matt Taylor	Minnesota Thunder	
19	(United States) Andrew Gregor	Charleston Battery, Miami FC, Puerto Rico Islanders	
19	(Canada) Justin Thompson	Charleston Battery, Miami FC, Puerto Rico Islanders	
20	(New Zealand) Cameron Knowles	Carolina RailHawks	
20	(United States) Josh Wicks	Carolina RailHawks	
21	(United States) Josh Wicks	Vancouver Whitecaps	

=== Statistics ===
==== Appearances and goals ====
All players contracted to the club during the season included.

No.	Pos	Nat	Player	Total		USL-1		Playoffs		U.S. Open Cup	
No.	Pos	Nat	Player	Apps	Goals	Apps	Goals	Apps	Goals	Apps	Goals
1	GK	(United States) USA	Bayard Elfvin	3	0	1+1	0	0+0	0	1+0	0
2	DF	(United States) USA	Kevin Meissner	1	0	0+1	0	0+0	0	0+0	0
4	DF	(United States) USA	Lee Morrison	13	0	6+5	0	0+0	0	1+1	0
5	DF	(Canada) CAN	Justin Thompson	29	3	23+0	1	4+0	1	2+0	1
6	DF	(New Zealand) NZL	Cameron Knowles	33	2	28+0	2	4+0	0	1+0	0
7	MF	(United States) USA	Shaun Higgins	29	0	17+6	0	4+0	0	2+0	0
8	MF	(United States) USA	Tom Poltl	28	0	18+5	0	4+0	0	1+0	0
9	MF	(United States) USA	Kiki Lara	21	0	6+13	0	0+0	0	1+1	0
10	MF	(United States) USA	Luke Kreamalmeyer	26	1	20+2	1	2+1	0	1+0	0
11	FW	(United States) USA	Luc Harrington	9	1	2+6	0	0+0	0	1+0	1
12	DF	(United States) USA	Leonard Griffin	33	2	27+0	2	4+0	0	2+0	0
13	MF	(United States) USA	Andrew Gregor	29	9	24+0	8	4+0	1	1+0	0
14	MF	(United States) USA	Neil Dombrowski	19	1	13+6	1	0+0	0	0+0	0
15	MF	(Kenya) KEN	Lawrence Olum	25	4	10+10	3	2+2	0	1+0	1
16	GK	(United States) USA	Steve Reese	0	0	0+0	0	0+0	0	0+0	0
17	DF	(United States) USA	Scot Thompson	33	2	27+0	2	4+0	0	2+0	0
18	MF	(England) ENG	Tom Taylor	7	0	0+5	0	0+0	0	1+1	0
19	MF	(United States) USA	Troy Ready	10	0	5+4	0	0+1	0	0+0	0
20	FW	(United States) USA	Matt Taylor	15	1	10+1	1	0+4	0	0+0	0
21	DF	(United States) USA	Garrett Marcum	0	0	0+0	0	0+0	0	0+0	0
22	FW	(United States) USA	Jaime Ambriz	7	2	1+3	1	2+1	1	0+0	0
23	GK	(United States) USA	Josh Wicks	32	0	27+0	0	4+0	0	1+0	0
25	FW	(England) ENG	David Hague	25	4	6+16	4	0+2	0	1+0	0
26	FW	(United States) USA	Bryan Jordan	32	6	16+10	5	4+0	1	1+1	0
33	FW	(United States) USA	Chris Bagley	27	1	20+3	1	2+0	0	0+2	0

==== Top scorers ====
Players with 1 goal or more included only.

Rk.	Nat.	Position	Player	Total	USL-1	Playoffs	U.S. Open Cup
1	(United States)	MF	Andrew Gregor	9	8	1	0
2	(United States)	FW	Bryan Jordan	6	5	1	0
3	(England)	FW	David Hague	4	4	0	0
3	(Kenya)	MF	Lawrence Olum	4	3	0	1
5	(Canada)	DF	Justin Thompson	3	1	1	1
6	(United States)	DF	Leonard Griffin	2	2	0	0
6	(New Zealand)	DF	Cameron Knowles	2	2	0	0
6	(United States)	DF	Scot Thompson	2	2	0	0
6	(United States)	FW	Jaime Ambriz	2	1	1	0
10	(United States)	FW	Chris Bagley	1	1	0	0
10	(United States)	MF	Neil Dombrowski	1	1	0	0
10	(United States)	MF	Luke Kreamalmeyer	1	1	0	0
10	(United States)	FW	Matt Taylor	1	1	0	0
10	(United States)	FW	Luc Harrington	1	0	0	1
			TOTALS	39	32	4	3

==== Disciplinary record ====
Players with 1 card or more included only.

No.	Nat.	Position	Player	Total		USL-1		Playoffs		U.S. Open Cup	
No.	Nat.	Position	Player	Booked	Sent off (straight red)	Booked	Sent off (straight red)	Booked	Sent off (straight red)	Booked	Sent off (straight red)
4	(United States)	DF	Lee Morrison	1	0	1	0	0	0	—	0
5	(Canada)	DF	Justin Thompson	4	0	4	0	0	0	—	0
6	(New Zealand)	DF	Cameron Knowles	4	1	4	0	0	0	—	1
7	(United States)	MF	Shaun Higgins	3	0	2	0	1	0	—	0
8	(United States)	MF	Tom Poltl	7	0	6	0	1	0	—	0
10	(United States)	MF	Luke Kreamalmeyer	1	0	1	0	0	0	—	0
11	(United States)	FW	Luc Harrington	1	0	1	0	0	0	—	0
12	(United States)	DF	Leonard Griffin	2	0	2	0	0	0	—	0
13	(United States)	MF	Andrew Gregor	11	0	9	0	2	0	—	0
14	(United States)	MF	Neil Dombrowski	4	0	4	0	0	0	—	0
15	(Kenya)	MF	Lawrence Olum	2	0	2	0	0	0	—	0
17	(United States)	DF	Scot Thompson	6	0	6	0	0	0	—	0
18	(England)	MF	Tom Taylor	1	0	1	0	0	0	—	0
19	(United States)	MF	Troy Ready	1	0	1	0	0	0	—	0
23	(United States)	DF	Josh Wicks	3	0	3	0	0	0	—	0
25	(England)	FW	David Hague	2	0	2	0	0	0	—	0
26	(United States)	FW	Bryan Jordan	7	1	6	1	1	0	—	0
			TOTALS	60	2	55	1	5	0	?	1

==== Goalkeeper stats ====
All goalkeepers included.

No.	Nat.	Player	Total				USL-1				Playoffs				U.S. Open Cup			
No.	Nat.	Player	MIN	GA	GAA	SV	MIN	GA	GAA	SV	MIN	GA	GAA	SV	MIN	GA	GAA	SV
1	(United States)	Bayard Elfvin	225	2	0.80	9	135	2	1.33	4	0	0	—	0	90	0	0.00	5
16	(United States)	Steve Reese	0	0	—	0	0	0	—	0	0	0	—	0	0	0	—	0
23	(United States)	Josh Wicks	2865	20	0.63	112	2385	16	0.60	87	390	2	0.46	19	90	2	2.00	6
		TOTALS	3090	22	0.64	121	2520	18	0.64	91	390	2	0.46	19	180	2	1.00	11

=== Player movement ===
==== Transfers in ====
Date	Player	Position	Previous club	Fee/notes	Ref
December 19, 2006	(United States) Neil Dombrowski	MF	(United States) Rochester Raging Rhinos	Free	
December 19, 2006	(United States) Kiki Lara	MF	(United States) Minnesota Thunder	Free	
January 4, 2007	(United States) Chris Bagley	FW	(United States) Wilmington Hammerheads	Free	
February 16, 2007	(United States) Kevin Meissner (R)	DF	(United States) San Diego Toreros (United States) Orange County Blue Star	Free	
February 16, 2007	(Kenya) Lawrence Olum (R)	MF	(United States) Missouri Baptist Spartans (United States) St. Louis Lions	Free	
February 21, 2007	(New Zealand) Cameron Knowles	DF	(United States) Real Salt Lake	Free	
February 27, 2007	(United States) Andrew Gregor	MF	(United States) Seattle Sounders	Free	
March 7, 2007	(England) David Hague (R)	FW	(United States) Grand Canyon Antelopes	Free	
March 12, 2007	(United States) Leonard Griffin	DF	(United States) Chicago Fire	Free	
March 16, 2007	(United States) Josh Wicks	GK	(Canada) Vancouver Whitecaps	Free	
April 20, 2007	(United States) Luc Harrington	FW	(United States) Charleston Battery	Free	
April 20, 2007	(United States) Shaun Higgins	MF	(United States) Chivas USA	Free	
April 20, 2007	(United States) Bryan Jordan (R)	FW	(United States) Oregon State Beavers (United States) San Fernando Valley Quakes	Free	
April 24, 2007	(Canada) Justin Thompson	DF	(England) Worcester City	Free	
May 1, 2007	(England) Tom Taylor	MF	(England) Walsall	Free	
May 23, 2007	(United States) Steve Reese	GK	(United States) Cascade Surge	Free	
July 25, 2007	(United States) Matt Taylor	FW	(United States) Chivas USA	Free	

==== Transfers out ====
Date	Player	Position	Destination club	Fee/notes	Ref
End of 2006 season	(Mexico) Hugo Alcaraz-Cuellar	MF	N/A	Contract expired and not re-signed	
End of 2006 season	(Mexico) Byron Alvarez	FW	N/A	Contract expired and not re-signed	
End of 2006 season	(United States) Oral Bullen	MF	N/A	Contract expired and not re-signed	
End of 2006 season	(United States) Salim Bullen	DF	N/A	Contract expired and not re-signed	
End of 2006 season	(Zimbabwe) Mubarike Chisoni	MF	N/A	Contract expired and not re-signed	
End of 2006 season	(United States) Jacobi Goodfellow	DF	N/A	Contract expired and not re-signed	
End of 2006 season	(Colombia) Alejandro Gutierrez	MF	N/A	Contract expired and not re-signed	
End of 2006 season	(United States) Sergio Iñiguez	MF	N/A	Contract expired and not re-signed	
End of 2006 season	(United States) Yuri Morales	FW	N/A	Contract expired and not re-signed	
End of 2006 season	(United States) Michael Nsien	DF	N/A	Contract expired and not re-signed	
End of 2006 season	(United States) Mike Randolph	MF	N/A	Contract expired and not re-signed	
End of 2006 season	(United States) Ronnie Silva	FW	N/A	Contract expired and not re-signed	
End of 2006 season	(New Zealand) Gavin Wilkinson	DF	N/A	Retired; named general manager and head coach	
September 29, 2007	(United States) Leonard Griffin	DF	(United States) Columbus Crew	Free	

==== Unsigned draft picks ====
Date	Player	Position	Previous club	Notes	Ref
January 24, 2007	(United States) Lyle Martin	FW	(United States) CSU Bakersfield Roadrunners (United States) Bakersfield Brigade	USL-1 College Player Draft, 1st round	
January 24, 2007	(United States) Colin Rigby	FW	(United States) Seattle Pacific Falcons	USL-1 College Player Draft, 2nd round	
