= 2007 United Soccer Leagues =

The 2007 season was the 21st edition of the United Soccer Leagues, an American club soccer organization with several divisions.

The season kicked off on Friday, April 13 when the 2006 league runners-up Rochester Raging Rhinos traveled to the Juan Ramon Loubriel Stadium in Bayamón to take on the Puerto Rico Islanders.

== General ==
- Two new teams join the First Division: the California Victory (San Francisco, CA), and the Carolina RailHawks (Cary, NC).
- The Virginia Beach Mariners franchise was terminated by the league.
- The Toronto Lynx depart the First Division for the Premier Development League (PDL).
- Three new teams join the Second Division: the Bermuda Hogges (Hamilton, Bermuda), the Cleveland City Stars, and Crystal Palace Baltimore.
- The Long Island Rough Riders depart the Second Division for the PDL.
- The Pittsburgh Riverhounds will be on hiatus during 2007 to reorganize.
- Many new teams join the PDL, for a complete list see here.

== Honors ==
| Competition | Champion | Runner-up | Regular season champion/Best USL team |
|---|---|---|---|
| USL First Division | Seattle Sounders | Atlanta Silverbacks | Seattle Sounders |
| USL Second Division | Harrisburg City Islanders | Richmond Kickers | Richmond Kickers |
| USL PDL | Laredo Heat | Michigan Bucks | Hampton Roads Piranhas |
| U.S. Open Cup | New England Revolution (MLS) | FC Dallas (MLS) | Carolina Railhawks/Seattle Sounders |
| Voyageurs Cup | Montreal Impact | Vancouver Whitecaps | n/a |

== Standings ==
USL First Division
- Season: 2008
- Champions: Seattle Sounders (2nd Title)
- Regular Season title: Seattle Sounders (1st Title)
- Matches: 168
- Goals: 378 (2.25 per match)
- Best Player: (France) Sebastien Le Toux, Seattle Sounders
- Top goalscorer: (Canada) Charles Gbeke, Montreal Impact (France) Sebastien Le Toux, Seattle Sounders (10 goals each)
- Best goalkeeper: (United States) Josh Wicks, Portland Timbers

=== First Division ===
The schedule was not a balanced home and away affair; to make up the four extra games to total 28, each team played their four geographically closest competitors. The playoff format was changed to qualify eight instead of six teams; therefore the first and second league champions obtained seeding to determine home field advantage instead of a first round bye as in previous seasons. The previous bidding to host between the two playoff finalists for the one game cup final was discontinued for this season.

| Pos | Team | Pld | W | L | D | GF | GA | GD | Pts | Qualification |
|---|---|---|---|---|---|---|---|---|---|---|
| 1 | Seattle Sounders (C, X) | 28 | 16 | 6 | 6 | 37 | 23 | +14 | 54 | Quarterfinal round of playoffs |
| 2 | Portland Timbers | 28 | 14 | 5 | 9 | 32 | 18 | +14 | 51 | Quarterfinal round of playoffs |
| 3 | Montreal Impact | 28 | 14 | 6 | 8 | 32 | 21 | +11 | 50 | Quarterfinal round of playoffs and CONCACAF Champions League (Note: As 2008 Canadian Championship winner) |
| 4 | Atlanta Silverbacks | 28 | 12 | 9 | 7 | 40 | 30 | +10 | 43 | Quarterfinal round of playoffs |
| 5 | Rochester Raging Rhinos | 28 | 12 | 10 | 6 | 39 | 36 | +3 | 42 | Quarterfinal round of playoffs |
| 6 | Puerto Rico Islanders | 28 | 10 | 8 | 10 | 35 | 34 | +1 | 40 | Quarterfinal round of playoffs |
| 7 | Vancouver Whitecaps | 28 | 9 | 7 | 12 | 27 | 24 | +3 | 39 | Quarterfinal round of playoffs |
| 8 | Carolina RailHawks | 28 | 8 | 12 | 8 | 24 | 34 | −10 | 32 | Quarterfinal round of playoffs |
| 9 | Miami FC | 28 | 9 | 15 | 4 | 31 | 41 | −10 | 31 | |
| 10 | Charleston Battery | 28 | 8 | 14 | 6 | 32 | 39 | −7 | 30 | |
| 11 | Minnesota Thunder | 28 | 5 | 12 | 11 | 32 | 35 | −3 | 26 | |
| 12 | California Victory | 28 | 4 | 17 | 7 | 17 | 43 | −26 | 19 | |

(C) Champion; (X) Commissioner's Cup

==== Playoffs ====
Quarterfinals; September 14/16
1 | Seattle Sounders | 2 | 1 | 3
8 | Carolina RailHawks | 0 | 0 | 0
3 | Montreal Impact | 3 | 0 | 3
6 | Puerto Rico Islanders | 2 | 3 | 5
4 | Atlanta Silverbacks | 2 | 1 | 3
5 | Rochester Raging Rhinos | 1 | 1 | 2
2 | Portland Timbers | 0 | 3 | 3
7 | Vancouver Whitecaps | 1 | 0 | 1

Semifinals; September 21/23
1 | Seattle Sounders (p) | 2 | 1 | 3 (4)
6 | Puerto Rico Islanders | 1 | 2 | 3 (2)
4 | Atlanta Silverbacks (p) | 1 | 0 | 1 (3)
2 | Portland Timbers | 1 | 0 | 1 (1)

Final; September 29
1 | Seattle Sounders | 4
4 | Atlanta Silverbacks | 0

==== Quarterfinals ====
September 14, 2007
7:30 PM EDT
First Leg

| Montreal Impact | 3–2 | Puerto Rico Islanders |
|---|---|---|
| Brown 8'; Vincello 26', 36' (yellow card) 56' | Report | Villegas 16' (yellow card) 32'; Lyssand (yellow card) 50' |

Claude Robillard Sports Complex
Montreal, Quebec
Attendance: 10,217
Referee: Silvio Petrescu
September 16, 2007
6:00 PM EDT
Second Leg

| Puerto Rico Islanders | 3–0 | Montreal Impact |
|---|---|---|
| Atieno (yellow card) 22' (goal) 29'; Noel (yellow card) 56'; Herrera 81'; Sims 90' | Report | Brown (yellow card) 45'; Arango (yellow card) 63'; Gervais (yellow card) 84' |

Juan Ramón Loubriel Stadium
Bayamón, Puerto Rico
Attendance: 6,112
Referee: Reggie Rutty

Puerto Rico Islanders won 5–3 on Aggregate.

September 14, 2007
7:30 PM EDT
First Leg

| Carolina Railhawks | 0–2 | Seattle Sounders |
|---|---|---|
| Norkus (yellow card) 40'; Maher (yellow card) 70' | Report | Scott 48'; Sakuda (yellow card) 72'; Schmid 82' |

SAS Stadium
Cary, North Carolina
Attendance: 923
Referee: NA
September 16, 2007
9:00 PM EDT
Second Leg

| Seattle Sounders | 1–0 | Carolina Railhawks |
|---|---|---|
| Gardner (yellow card) 17'; O'Brien (yellow card) 27' (goal) 90' (pen.); Treschuk (yellow card) 52'; Alcaraz-Cuellar (yellow card) 77' | Report | Worthen (yellow card) 45' (yellow-red card) 90'; Steele (yellow card) 85'; Stokes (red card) 85' |

Qwest Field
Seattle, Washington
Attendance: 3,640
Referee: Hidejet Tica

Seattle Sounders won 3–0 on Aggregate.

September 14, 2007
8:00 PM EDT
First Leg

| Atlanta Silverbacks | 2–1 | Rochester Raging Rhinos |
|---|---|---|
| Ukah 8'; Rios (yellow card) 52'; Wolfe 87' | Report | Ambersley 17' (yellow card) 52'; Palguta (yellow card) 57'; Menyongar (yellow card) 66'; Aloisi (yellow card) 83' |

RE/MAX Greater Atlanta Stadium
Atlanta, Georgia
Attendance: 1,482
Referee: Roni Canales
September 16, 2007
6:00 PM EDT
Second Leg

| Rochester Raging Rhinos | 1–1 | Atlanta Silverbacks |
|---|---|---|
| Perry (yellow card) 24'; Delicate 79' | Report | Liendo (yellow card) 12'; Millwood 40'; Ukah (yellow card) 72'; Wolfe (red card) 90' |

PAETEC Park
Rochester, New York
Attendance: 4,294
Referee: Richard Sanchez

Atlanta Silverbacks won 3–2 on Aggregate.

September 14, 2007
10:00 PM EDT
First Leg

| Vancouver Whitecaps | 1–0 | Portland Timbers |
|---|---|---|
| Clarke (yellow card) 58'; Jordan 76': Valente (yellow card) 77' | Report | Jordan (yellow card) 22'; Gregor (yellow card) 37' |

Swangard Stadium
Burnaby, British Columbia
Attendance: 4,761
Referee: Dave Gantar
September 16, 2007
8:00 PM EDT
Second Leg

| Portland Timbers | 3–0 | Vancouver Whitecaps |
|---|---|---|
| Thompson 27'; Gregor 70'; Higgins (yellow card) 72'; Ambriz 82' | Report | Jordan (yellow card) 90' |

PGE Park
Portland, Oregon
Attendance: 8,522
Referee: Jair Marrufo

Portland Timbers won 3–1 on Aggregate.

==== Semifinals ====
September 21, 2007
8:00 PM EDT
First Leg

| Puerto Rico Islanders | 1–2 | Seattle Sounders |
|---|---|---|
| González (yellow card) 29' (yellow-red card) 77'; Villegas 39'; Krause (yellow card) 39'; Noel (yellow card) | Report | Alcaraz-Cuellar 24'; Gardner (yellow card) 39'; Jackson (red card) 56'; Treschuk 69' |

Juan Ramón Loubriel Stadium
Bayamón, Puerto Rico
Attendance: 12,098
Referee: Joe Carroccio
September 23, 2007
8:00 PM EDT
Second Leg

| Seattle Sounders | 1–2 (a.e.t.) | Puerto Rico Islanders |
|---|---|---|
| Howes 101' | Report | Sims (yellow card) 9'; Atieno (yellow card) 9'; Delgado 80'; Delgado (yellow card) 81'; Herrera 117' |
Penalties
| Howes (penalty scored); O'Brien (penalty scored); Alcaraz-Cuellar (penalty scored); Schmid (penalty scored) | 4–2 | (penalty missed) Atieno; (penalty scored) Simmonds; (penalty scored) Herrera; (penalty missed) Lyssand |

Starfire Sports Complex
Tukwila, Washington
Attendance: 3,107
Referee: Richard Sanchez

Seattle Sounders won 4–2 on penalties after tying 3–3 on Aggregate.

September 21, 2007
8:00 PM EDT
First Leg

| Atlanta Silverbacks | 1–1 | Portland Timbers |
|---|---|---|
| Poltl (yellow card) 16'; Ukah 43'; Lancaster (yellow card) 90' | Report | Jordan 49'; Gregor (yellow card) 90' |

RE/MAX Greater Atlanta Stadium
Atlanta, Georgia
Attendance: 2,792
September 23, 2007
8:00 PM EDT
Second Leg

| Portland Timbers | 0–0 (a.e.t.) | Atlanta Silverbacks |
|---|---|---|
| | Report | Kandji (yellow card) 30'; Antoniuk (yellow card) 38'; Wolfe (yellow card) 87' |
Penalties
| Gregor (penalty missed); Griffin (penalty scored); Kreamalmeyer (penalty missed); Olum (penalty missed) | 1–3 | (penalty missed) Ríos; (penalty scored) Rivillo; (penalty scored) Kandji; (penalty scored) Ukah |

PGE Park
Portland, Oregon
Attendance: 11,789
Referee: Terry Vaughn

Atlanta Silverbacks won 3–1 on penalties after tying 1–1 on Aggregate.

==== Final ====
September 29, 2007
10:00 PM EDT

| Seattle Sounders | 4–0 | Atlanta Silverbacks |
|---|---|---|
| Howes 45', 82'; Alcaraz-Cuellar 61' (yellow card) 69'; Le Toux (yellow card) 87'; Tomlinson 90+2' (yellow card) 90+2' | Report | Liendo (yellow card) 63' |

Starfire Sports Complex
Tukwila, Washington
Attendance: 4,893
Referee: Mike Geiger

==== Awards and All-League Teams ====
First Team
F: (United States) Dan Antoniuk (Atlanta Silverbacks); (Ivory Coast) Hamed Diallo (Rochester Raging Rhinos); (France) Sebastien Le Toux (Seattle Sounders) (MVP & Co-Leading Goalscorer)
M: (England) Stephen Armstrong (Charleston Battery); (United States) Andrew Gregor (Portland Timbers); (Canada) Martin Nash (Vancouver Whitecaps); (Brazil) Zinho (Miami FC)
D: (Canada) Gabriel Gervais (Montreal Impact); (United States) David Hayes (Atlanta Silverbacks) (Defender of the Year); (New Zealand) Cameron Knowles (Portland Timbers)
G: (United States) Josh Wicks (Portland Timbers) (Goalkeeper of the Year)
Coach: (New Zealand) Gavin Wilkinson (Portland Timbers) (Coach of the Year)

Second Team
F: (Canada) Charles Gbeke (Montreal Impact) (Co-Leading Goalscorer); (United States) Roger Levesque (Seattle Sounders)
M: (Argentina) Leonardo Di Lorenzo (Montreal Impact); (United States) Brian Farber (Minnesota Thunder); (United States) Kupono Low (Carolina RailHawks); (Liberia) Johnny Menyongar (Rochester Raging Rhinos)
D: (United States) Taylor Graham (Seattle Sounders); (United States) Steve Klein (Vancouver Whitecaps); (United States) Scot Thompson (Portland Timbers); Marco Velez (Puerto Rico Islanders)
G: (United States) Matt Jordan (Montreal Impact)

=== Second Division ===
USL Second Division
- Season: 2007
- Champions: Harrisburg City Islanders (1st Title)
- Regular Season title: Richmond Kickers (3rd Title)
- Matches: 100
- Goals: 269 (2.69 per match)
- Best Player: (United States) Mike Burke, Richmond Kickers
- Top goalscorer: (United States) Jacob Coggins, Charlotte Eagles (12 goals)
- Best goalkeeper: (United States) Ronnie Pascale, Richmond Kickers

| Pos | Team | Pld | W | L | D | GF | GA | GD | Pts | Qualification |
|---|---|---|---|---|---|---|---|---|---|---|
| 1 | Richmond Kickers | 20 | 12 | 3 | 5 | 37 | 15 | +22 | 41 | Regular season champion |
| 2 | Cleveland City Stars | 20 | 10 | 1 | 9 | 31 | 14 | +17 | 39 | Playoff berth clinched |
| 3 | Harrisburg City Islanders (C) | 20 | 11 | 4 | 5 | 26 | 15 | +11 | 38 | Playoff berth clinched |
| 4 | Charlotte Eagles | 20 | 11 | 7 | 2 | 40 | 29 | +11 | 35 | Playoff berth clinched |
| 5 | Crystal Palace Baltimore | 20 | 9 | 6 | 5 | 27 | 20 | +7 | 32 | |
| 6 | Western Mass Pioneers | 20 | 7 | 7 | 6 | 25 | 26 | −1 | 27 | |
| 7 | Wilmington Hammerheads | 20 | 4 | 9 | 7 | 22 | 30 | −8 | 19 | |
| 8 | Cincinnati Kings | 20 | 4 | 11 | 5 | 29 | 41 | −12 | 17 | |
| 9 | New Hampshire Phantoms | 20 | 3 | 12 | 5 | 16 | 34 | −18 | 13 (Note: New Hampshire was penalized 1 point for circumstances not released by the USL.) | |
| 10 | Bermuda Hogges | 20 | 3 | 14 | 3 | 16 | 45 | −29 | 12 | |

(C) Champions

==== Playoffs ====
Semifinals; August 18, 7:00 EDT
1 | Richmond Kickers (a.e.t.) | 2
4 | Charlotte Eagles | 1
2 | Cleveland City Stars | 0
3 | Harrisburg City Islanders (a.e.t.) | 1

Final; August 25, 8:00 EDT
1 | Richmond Kickers | 1 (7)
3 | Harrisburg City Islanders (p) | 1 (8)

==== Semifinals ====
August 18, 2007
7:00 PM EDT

| Cleveland City Stars | 0–1 (a.e.t.) | Harrisburg City Islanders |
|---|---|---|
| Leibbrandt (yellow card) 18'; DeVae (yellow card) 36'; Moffat (yellow card) 55'; Cummings (yellow card) 106' | Report | Devlin (yellow card) 44'; Pierce (yellow card) 93'; Fisher 106' |

Krenzler Field
Cleveland, Ohio
Attendance: 1,478
Referee: Rizal Milliken

August 18, 2007
7:00 PM EDT

| Richmond Kickers | 2–1 (a.e.t.) | Charlotte Eagles |
|---|---|---|
| Watson 14'; Alexander (yellow card) 54'; Jaman 110' | Report | Spencer (yellow card) 42'; Swinehart (yellow card) 84' (goal) 87' |

University of Richmond Stadium
Richmond, Virginia
Attendance: 3,015
Referee: Daniel Stead

==== Final ====
August 25, 2007
8:00 PM EDT

| Richmond Kickers | 1–1 (a.e.t.) | Harrisburg City Islanders |
|---|---|---|
| Bulow (yellow card) 67'; Schramm 75' (yellow card) 113'; Gorres (yellow card) 103' | Report | Morman (yellow card) 31'; Ombiji 45'; Schofield (yellow card) 58'; Bixler (yellow card) 100' |
Penalties
| Bulow (penalty scored); Gorres (penalty scored); Dotsenko (penalty missed); Schramm (penalty scored); Howe (penalty scored); Pace (penalty scored); Wolfe (penalty scored); Pascale (penalty scored); Harding (penalty missed) | 7–8 | (penalty scored) Baker; (penalty scored) Lookingland; (penalty scored) Velton; (penalty missed) Calvano; (penalty scored) Bixler; (penalty scored) Johnston; (penalty scored) Clay; (penalty scored) Schofield; (penalty scored) Pierce |

University of Richmond Stadium
Richmond, Virginia
Attendance: 3,488
Referee: Mark Kadlecik

=== Premier Development League ===
- See 2007 PDL Season

== See also ==
- United Soccer Leagues
