= David Haig (disambiguation) =

David Haig may refer to:

- David Haig, English actor
- David Haig (biologist), Australian biologist

== See also ==
- David Haigh (born 1977), British businessman
- David Hague (born 1982), English footballer
- David B. Haight (1906–2004), American leader in The Church of Jesus Christ of Latter-day Saints
