= Tighe Dombrowski =

American soccer player

Personal information
- Full name: Tighe Dombrowski
- Date of birth: March 4, 1982 (age 44)
- Place of birth: West Allis, Wisconsin, United States
- Height: 5 ft 8 in (1.73 m)
- Position: Left back

Youth career
- 2000–2003: University of Wisconsin–Milwaukee

Senior career*
Years	Team	Apps	(Gls)
2002	Des Moines Menace		
2003	Chicago Fire Reserves		
2004–2005	San Jose Earthquakes	4	(0)
2006–2007	IK Sirius FK	55	(6)
2008	Minnesota Thunder	16	(1)
2019	Milwaukee Bavarians		
- * Club domestic league appearances and goals as of September 27, 2008

Tighe Dombrowski (born March 4, 1982) is an American former soccer player.

Dombrowski played four years of college soccer for the UW–Milwaukee Panthers of the University of Wisconsin–Milwaukee from 2000 to 2003, during which he was named first team All-Horizon League three times. He was named an honorable mention All-American following his senior season in 2003. Dombrowski tallied sixteen goals and thirteen assists in his time at UW–Milwaukee, and helped them advance to the second round of the NCAA Tournament his sophomore, junior, and senior years. In 2002, he played for the Des Moines Menace in the Premier Development League. In 2003, he played for the Chicago Fire Reserves.

After graduating from UW–Milwaukee, Dombrowski was drafted fiftieth overall in the 2004 MLS SuperDraft by the San Jose Earthquakes, and signed to a developmental contract. Along with the rest of his Earthquakes teammates, he moved to Houston for the 2006 season, but was signed by Swedish then-Division 1 (effectively the third division) side IK Sirius Fotboll in April 2006, having impressed the coaching staff at Studenternas IP during his trial in February and March. In July 2007, Tighe helped Sirius save three points by scoring two goals in the last minutes of the game against Jönköpings Södra IF, turning the game from 0–1 to 2–1 in the span of six minutes.

Dombrowski had a trial with New York Red Bulls but did not earn a contract and later signed with USL-1 side Minnesota Thunder.

== Personal ==
Tighe is one of the Dombrowski brothers, all of whom are also pro soccer players: Scott Dombrowski, Zeke Dombrowski, Chad Dombrowski and Neil Dombrowski.
