= Andre Schmid (soccer) =

American soccer player

Personal information
- Date of birth: April 5, 1983 (age 43)
- Place of birth: Sacramento, California, U.S.
- Height: 6 ft 4 in (1.93 m)
- Position: Forward

Youth career
- 2001–2004: St. John's University

Senior career*
Years	Team	Apps	(Gls)
2003	Brooklyn Knights	5	(2)
2006	Houston Dynamo	0	(0)
2007–2008	Seattle Sounders	37	(2)

International career
2002	United States U18	4	(0)
- * Club domestic league appearances and goals as of September 27, 2008

Andre Schmid (born April 5, 1983) is an American former soccer player.

== Career ==
Schmid attended Christian Brothers High School in California where he was an ADIDAS high school All American. He then attended St. John's University in New York where he played soccer from 2001 to 2005. He lost most of the 2003 season to a foot injury which led him to coming back in 2005 for a fifth season with the Redmen. In January 2006, the Houston Dynamo picked Schmid in the third round (32nd overall) in the 2006 MLS SuperDraft. He never played for the Dynamo first team. Later in 2006, Schmid played for the New York Red Bulls reserve team. On March 27, 2007, he signed with Seattle Sounders of the USL First Division where he played eighteen games in his first season.

Schmid earned four caps with the United States U-18 national team in 2002.

== Honors ==
=== Seattle Sounders ===
- USL First Division Championship (1): 2007
- USL First Division Commissioner's Cup (1): 2007
