= Chad Dombrowski =

American soccer player

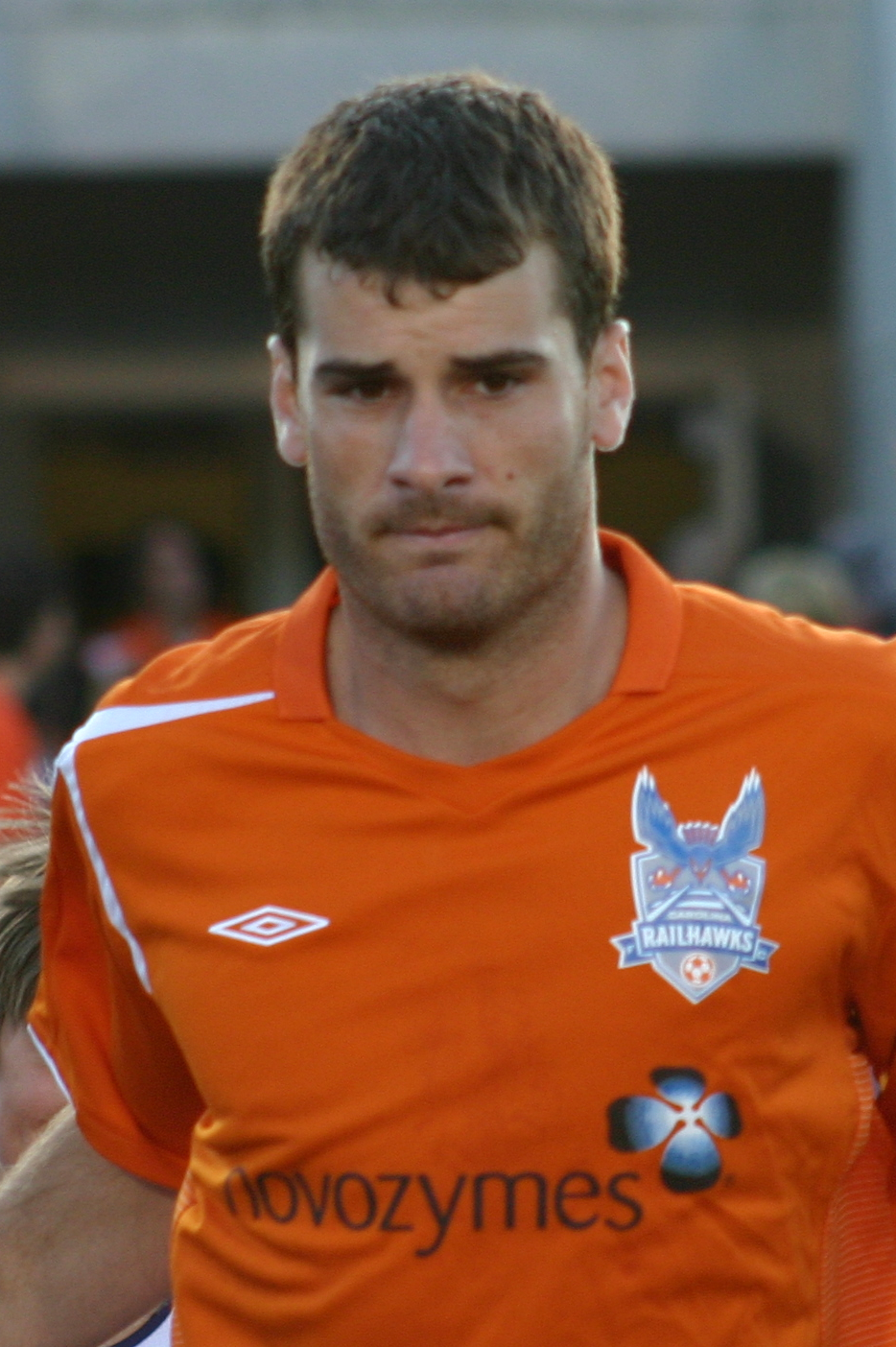

Personal information
- Date of birth: October 5, 1980 (age 46)
- Place of birth: West Allis, Wisconsin, U.S.
- Height: 6 ft 1 in (1.85 m)
- Position: Defender

College career
Years	Team	Apps	(Gls)
1999–2002	Milwaukee Panthers		

Senior career*
Years	Team	Apps	(Gls)
2003–2004	Milwaukee Wave United	53	(9)
2005–2007	Milwaukee Wave (indoor)	71	(13)
2005–2006	Minnesota Thunder	24	(4)
2007–2008	Carolina RailHawks	37	(2)
Total		185	(28)
- * Club domestic league appearances and goals

Chad Dombrowski (born October 5, 1980) is an American retired soccer player who spent six seasons in the USL First Division.

== College ==
Dombrowski attended the University of Wisconsin–Milwaukee where he played on the men's soccer team. He was a two time all-Horizon League selection and a second team All-American.

== Professional ==
In January 2003, the Chicago Fire of Major League Soccer selected Dombrowski in the fifth round (44 overall) of the 2003 MLS SuperDraft. He was also drafted by the Milwaukee Wave United of the USL A-League. When the Fire did not sign him, Dombrowski joined Milwaukee for the 2003 and 2004 seasons. In December 2002, Dombrowski had also been drafted by the Milwaukee Wave of Major Indoor Soccer League in the first round (8th overall) in the 2002 MISL Amateur Draft. He did not sign with the Wave, but played outdoor for two seasons. On February 10, 2005, he finally joined the Wave for the last half of the 2004–2005 indoor season. He played through the 2006–2007 season in Milwaukee, winning the 2005 MISL Championship. After the Wave United withdrew from the A-League following the 2004 season, Dombrowski moved to the Minnesota Thunder for the 2005 and 2006 seasons. In 2005 he led the Thunder to the semi-finals of the 2005 Lamar Hunt U.S. Open Cup where he scored a goal in a loss to the eventual champion Los Angeles Galaxy. In 2007, he signed with the expansion Carolina RailHawks.

== Personal ==
Chad is one of the Dombrowski brothers, all of whom are soccer players, and some are also pro soccer players: Scott Dombrowski, Zeke Dombrowski, Tighe Dombrowski and Neil Dombrowski. Quinn, the second youngest brother, was a member of the 2012 Polonia Soccer Club Wisconsin state runner-up team.
