= Zeke Dombrowski =

American soccer player (born 1986)

Personal information
- Full name: Zeke Dombrowski
- Date of birth: July 27, 1986 (age 40)
- Place of birth: Hales Corners, Wisconsin, United States
- Height: 6 ft 0 in (1.83 m)
- Position: Midfielder

Youth career
- 2004–2007: UW–Milwaukee Panthers

Senior career*
| Years | Team | Apps | (Gls) |
| 2006–2007 | Des Moines Menace | 28 | (1) |
| 2009 | Wilmington Hammerheads | 18 | (2) |
- * Club domestic league appearances and goals as of 11 October 2009

Zeke Dombrowski (born July 27, 1986, in Hales Corners, Wisconsin) is an American former soccer player. As of 2015 he is employed by the City of West Allis, Wisconsin Fire Department as a Firefighter/Paramedic.

== Career ==
=== College and amateur ===
Dombrowski played college soccer at the University of Wisconsin–Milwaukee, playing in a total of 84 matches, ranking fifth overall in school history. He was named to the All-Horizon League First Team, was an ESPN The Magazine First Team All-District selection, a member of the Horizon Academic All-League Team and a First Team NCSAA All-North/Central Region Scholar as a senior.

During his college years Dombrowski also played with Des Moines Menace in the USL Premier Development League.

=== Professional ===
Dombrowski's professional career began when he signed for the Wilmington Hammerheads in 2009. He made his professional debut on April 25, 2009, in Wilmington's 2–2 opening day with the Charlotte Eagles.

== Personal ==
Zeke is one of the Dombrowski brothers, who are professional soccer players: Scott Dombrowski, Chad Dombrowski, Tighe Dombrowski and Neil Dombrowski.

== Honors ==
=== Wilmington Hammerheads ===
- USL Second Division Regular Season Champions (1): 2009
