= Nathan Knox =

New Zealand footballer (born 1981)

Personal information
- Full name: Nathan Knox
- Date of birth: 13 July 1981 (age 45)
- Place of birth: Christchurch, New Zealand
- Height: 6 ft 2 in (1.88 m)
- Position: Forward

Youth career
- 2003–2006: Macalester Scots

Senior career*
Years	Team	Apps	(Gls)
2003	Rangers		
2004–2005	Canterbury United		
2006	Minnesota Thunder	33	(4)
2007	Seattle Sounders	11	(3)
2008	Atlanta Silverbacks	8	(1)
2008–2009	Minnesota Thunder	20	(3)
2009–2010	Otago United	10	(3)
2010	Western Suburbs FC	5	(3)
2010	Otago United	8	(2)
2011	Dandenong Thunder	5	(1)
- * Club domestic league appearances and goals as of 22 October 2009

Nathan Knox (born 13 July 1981 in Christchurch, New Zealand) is a former professional football player who played in the US for Minnesota, Seattle and Atlanta.

== Career ==
=== College and amateur ===
Knox played college soccer for Macalester College in St. Paul, Minnesota while completing his degree, and spent his summers playing semi-professional football in his native New Zealand, for Rangers and Canterbury United in the New Zealand Football Championship.

=== Professional ===
Knox signed his first professional contract in 2006 with Minnesota Thunder of the USL First Division. In 2007, he moved to the Seattle Sounders in the same league before transferring to the Atlanta Silverbacks in the spring of 2008.

On 8 August 2008, the Silverbacks traded Knox back to the Minnesota Thunder in exchange for Aaron Paye.

== Honors ==
Seattle Sounders

- USL First Division Commissioner's Cup: 2007
