= Bryan Little (footballer) =

Scottish footballer

Personal information
- Date of birth: 18 May 1978 (age 48)
- Place of birth: Scotland
- Height: 5 ft 11 in (1.80 m)
- Position: Midfielder

Team information
- Current team: Team Wellington

Senior career*
Years	Team	Apps	(Gls)
1997–1998	Berwick Rangers	8	(0)
2003–2004	Miramar Rangers	48	(25)
2004–2006	Team Wellington	36	(17)
2006–2008	Auckland City	34	(15)
2008	Portland Timbers	17	(0)
2008–2010	Team Wellington	30	(4)
- * Club domestic league appearances and goals as of 30 April 2010

Bryan Little (born 18 May 1978) is a Scottish footballer.

== Club career ==
He began his career in Scotland with Berwick Rangers, before spending time in New Zealand with Miramar Rangers, Team Wellington and Auckland City.

== Coaching career ==
After retiring from playing, Little pursued a career in coaching. He held the role of Director of Coaching & Head Soccer Coach at Almaden Valley Soccer in San Jose, CA. After this role, he moved on to be the Head Coach of Westminster High School in Westminster, Colorado, a post he held for 4 seasons.
