= Tim Karalexis =

American soccer player (born 1980)

Personal information
- Full name: Timothy Karalexis
- Date of birth: September 18, 1980 (age 46)
- Place of birth: Weymouth, Massachusetts, United States
- Height: 6 ft 2 in (1.88 m)
- Position: Defender

Youth career
- 1999–2001: Saint Anselm Hawks

Senior career*
Years	Team	Apps	(Gls)
2002–2004	Wilmington Hammerheads	52	(3)
2005–2007	Charleston Battery	66	(0)
2008	Portland Timbers	10	(0)
2009	Wilmington Hammerheads	12	(2)
- * Club domestic league appearances and goals as of 11 October 2009

Tim Karalexis (born September 18, 1980, in Weymouth, Massachusetts) is an American soccer player, currently retired from the sport.

== Career ==
=== Youth and college ===
Karalexis attended Weymouth High School, graduating in 1998. While at Weymouth, he led the school's soccer team to the Massachusetts Division I championship and was named the Boston Globe Division I Player of the Year. He then attended Saint Anselm College, playing on the school's NCAA Division II soccer team from 1998 to 2001. He was a second team All American in both 2000 and 2001.

=== Professional ===
In 2002, Karalexis went on trial with the Charleston Battery of the USL First Division, before signing with the Wilmington Hammerheads of the USL Second Division. In 2003 and 2004 he was selected as a first team USL-2 All Star, and he was also the 2004 USL-2 Defender of the Year. On October 28, 2004, he signed with the Charleston Battery.

On December 5, 2007, the Battery traded Karalexis to the Portland Timbers in exchange for Luke Kreamalmeyer, and scored on his Timbers debut. On July 16, 2007, the Orlando Sharks of Major Indoor Soccer League selected Karalexis in the third round of the MISL Supplemental Draft, but he declined to sign with them.

Karalexis rejoined the Wilmington Hammerheads in 2009.

== Honors ==
=== Wilmington Hammerheads ===
- USL Second Division Regular Season Champions (1): 2009
- Boston Globe Division I Player of the Year: 1998
