= Cameron Dunn =

American soccer player

Personal information
- Full name: Cameron Dunn
- Date of birth: February 13, 1984 (age 42)
- Place of birth: Alta Loma, CA, United States
- Height: 5 ft 11 in (1.80 m)
- Position: Defender

College career
Years	Team	Apps	(Gls)
2002–2006	UC Irvine Anteaters		

Senior career*
Years	Team	Apps	(Gls)
2004–2005	Orange County Blue Star		
2007	Chivas USA	0	(0)
2007	California Victory	10	(0)
2008	Hollywood United		
2008–2009	Portland Timbers	8	(1)
2011	Los Angeles Blues	18	(0)
- * Club domestic league appearances and goals

Cameron Dunn (born February 13, 1984, in Alta Loma, California) is an American soccer player who last played for Los Angeles Blues in the USL Professional Division.

== Career ==
=== College and amateur ===
Dunn attended Alta Loma High School where he was a three-year letterwinner in soccer while also captaining the team both his junior and senior years. Dunn was named Mt. Baldy League MVP, and named to First Team All-CIF in his final season at Alta Loma High School.

Dunn played college soccer at NCAA Division I University of California, Irvine where he redshirted his freshman season, but played on the first team from 2003 to 2006. During the 2003, 2004 and 2005 collegiate off seasons, Dunn played for Orange County Blue Star in the USL Premier Development League, helping the team to the Southwest Division title and the National playoff semi finals in 2005.

=== Professional ===
Dunn was drafted in the 4th round (46th overall) of the 2007 MLS SuperDraft by Chivas USA. He signed as a developmental player on March 2, 2007, but was released by the team on April 12, 2007.

Dunn instead signed with expansion franchise California Victory in the USL First Division, playing ten games through the rest of the season, but Victory folded and withdrew from the league at the end of the season.

In 2008, Dunn joined Los Angeles-based amateur team Hollywood United, and helped them shock Portland Timbers in the first round of the 2008 Lamar Hunt U.S. Open Cup. Dunn also spent time training with Chivas USA and playing in three MLS Reserve Division games, scoring one goal.

On August 1, 2008, the Portland Timbers of the USL First Division signed Dunn for the remainder of the season. He was released on December 7, 2009, after spending two years with the club.

Having spent 2010 out of the professional game, Dunn signed with the expansion Los Angeles Blues of the new USL Professional League on January 19, 2011.
