= Aaron Paye =

Liberian footballer

Personal information
- Full name: Aaron Paye
- Date of birth: January 19, 1981 (age 45)
- Place of birth: Monrovia, Liberia, Liberia
- Height: 1.73 m (5 ft 8 in)
- Position: Striker

Youth career
- 2001–2004: Fairleigh Dickinson

Senior career*
Years	Team	Apps	(Gls)
2004–2008	Minnesota Thunder	73	(13)
2008	Atlanta Silverbacks	9	(0)
- * Club domestic league appearances and goals as of 1 October 2008

Aaron Paye (born January 19, 1981) is a Liberian former footballer who played as a striker.

== Career ==
Paye attended Fairleigh Dickinson where he was a third team All American. Paye was with the Minnesota Thunder of the USL from 2004 to August 8, 2008. Paye lost his spot on the team in the off-season of 2007, but was rostered back onto the team a month into the season after working hard and impressing the coaching staff. On August 8, 2008, the Minnesota Thunder announced a trade with the Atlanta Silverbacks, sending Nathan Knox back to the Minnesota Thunder, a team he had played for previously, and Paye going to the Sliverbacks in an even swap, as both are forwards. Currently, he is the assistant coach at Blake High School, and coaches the Minneapolis United U16 Premier team.
