= Arsène Oka =

Ivorian footballer

Personal information
- Full name: Touoly Arsène Oka
- Date of birth: 20 December 1983 (age 42)
- Place of birth: Abidjan, Ivory Coast
- Height: 5 ft 8 in (1.73 m)
- Position: Forward

Senior career*
Years	Team	Apps	(Gls)
2004	Stade d'Abidjan		
2005	Stella Club d'Adjamé		
2006	Africa Sports National		
2006–2007	New England Revolution	1	(0)
2008	Portland Timbers	7	(0)
2009	Cleveland City Stars	13	(0)
2010	Vermont Voltage	4	(1)
2015–2016	Central Park Rangers FC		
2016–2017	Greek American AA		
2017–2019	KidSuper Samba AC	6	(5)
2020–2021	KidSuper Samba AC	1	(0)

International career^{‡}
- Ivory Coast U-17
- Ivory Coast U-20
- * Club domestic league appearances and goals as of 13 November 2020 ‡ National team caps and goals as of 16 March 2020

Arsène Oka (born 20 December 1983) is a former Ivorian footballer who played as a forward.

== Career ==
=== Professional ===
Oka played in his native Ivory Coast for Stade d'Abidjan, Stella Club d'Adjamé and Africa Sports National, helping the latter team to the runner-up spot in the Côte d'Ivoire Premier Division in 2005 and subsequently playing in the CAF Champions League, before signing with New England Revolution of Major League Soccer in September 2006.

Having found opportunities in MLS difficult because of a persistent MCL injury, and having made just 1 senior appearance for Revolution against the Chicago Fire in his two years with the team, Oka signed with the Portland Timbers for the 2008 season, eventually featuring in 7 games and scoring 1 goal. He then signed for the newly promoted USL First Division side Cleveland City Stars for the 2009 season, and played 13 times for the team, before the club folded at the end of the season.

Having been unable to secure a professional contract elsewhere, Oka signed with Vermont Voltage of the USL Premier Development League, scoring the winning goal in their opening match of the 2010 season.
