= Kiki Lara =

American soccer player and coach

Personal information
- Full name: Ricardo Lara
- Date of birth: July 24, 1981 (age 45)
- Place of birth: Las Cruces, New Mexico, United States
- Height: 5 ft 10 in (1.78 m)
- Position: Midfielder

Team information
- Current team: Incarnate Word Cardinals (Head coach)

Youth career
- 1997–2000: Bollettieri Soccer Academy

College career
Years	Team	Apps	(Gls)
2000–2004	Incarnate Word Cardinals		

Senior career*
Years	Team	Apps	(Gls)
2004–2006	Minnesota Thunder	38	(1)
2007–2008	Portland Timbers	25	(0)

Managerial career
- 2005: Washington State Cougars (women's asst.)
- 2009–2014: Dayton Flyers (men's asst.)
- 2015–2019: Eastern Illinois Panthers (men's)
- 2016–2017: Eastern Illinois Panthers (women's)
- 2019–: Incarnate Word Cardinals (men's)
- * Club domestic league appearances and goals

Ricardo "Kiki" Lara (born July 24, 1981, in Las Cruces, New Mexico) is an American former soccer player who last played for the USL First Division side Portland Timbers and currently works as head coach of the Incarnate Word Cardinals.

== Career ==
Lara played college soccer in San Antonio, Texas at the University of the Incarnate Word. He captained the team from 2001 to 2003 and was also named a Division II All-American in each of those 3 seasons. In 2004, he joined the Minnesota Thunder and played 26 games in his inaugural season. He then played 19 times and scored one goal the following campaign.

== Coaching career ==
He started his coaching career in 1995 as coach of the Las Cruces Strikers, a youth soccer club founded by his mother Linda Lara.

In 2005 while still a player with the Minnesota Thunder, he also worked as an assistant coach of the Washington State University women's soccer program.

On June 8, 2009, he was named as an assistant coach for the Dayton Flyers men's soccer team.

He was named the head coach of the Eastern Illinois Panthers men's soccer team on March 10, 2015. Lara was the Eastern Illinois women's soccer head coach for the 2016 and 2017 seasons.
