= Steve Reese =

American soccer player (born 1980)

Personal information
- Date of birth: October 8, 1980 (age 46)
- Place of birth: Salem, Oregon, United States
- Height: 6 ft 2 in (1.88 m)
- Position: Goalkeeper

College career
Years	Team	Apps	(Gls)
1999–2000	Western Baptist Warriors		

Senior career*
Years	Team	Apps	(Gls)
1997–1999	Cascade Surge	1	(0)
2000–2003	FCM Bacău	21	(0)
2002	→ Aerostar Bacău (loan)	7	(0)
2003	Politehnica Timişoara	2	(0)
2006	Cascade Surge	6	(0)
2007–2008	Portland Timbers	0	(0)
2008–2009	Monterrey La Raza (indoor)	5	(0)
2009	Cascade Surge	4	(0)
2010–2011	Kitsap Pumas (indoor)	7	(0)
Total		53	(0)

Managerial career
- 2006–2007: Oregon State Beavers (assistant)
- 2008: Concordia University, Portland (assistant)
- 2015–2019: Portland Timbers 2 (assistant)
- * Club domestic league appearances and goals

Steve Reese (born October 8, 1980) is an American former soccer player who currently coaches at the Portland Timbers academy.

== Career ==
=== College and amateur ===
Reese was born in and grew up in Salem, Oregon, attending South Salem High School where he was an all state soccer player. Reese attended Western Baptist College (now Corban University) for one year, 2000–2001 before leaving school to pursue a professional career. While at Western Baptist, he played one season, 2000, of college soccer at the NAIA school.

In 1997-1999 Reese also spent three seasons with the Cascade Surge of the USISL when he was a teenager.

=== Professional ===
Reese traveled to Europe where he signed with FCM Bacău in the Romanian Liga I. He was loaned to Liga III team Aerostar Bacău. In early 2003, he moved to FC Timişoara of the Romanian Liga I. He also spent time training on the Isle of Wight.

In 2004, Reese returned to the U.S. where he spent several weeks training with the MetroStars of Major League Soccer. While he appeared in a preseason game, he was not offered a contract. He then trained with the Portland Timbers for the remainder of the season.

In 2006, Reese spent the season with the Cascade Surge of the division USL Premier Development League. He was 1-5-0 with a 2.40 goals against average. On May 23, 2007, the Portland Timbers of the USL First Division signed Reese as the team's third string goalkeeper. The Timbers kept him through the 2008 season, but he never played a game and was released before the 2009 season. He signed in November 2008 with Monterrey La Raza of the National Indoor Soccer League. He played five games and was named to the 2008-2009 NISL All Rookie Team.

In 2009, Reese returned to Cascade Surge which folded at the end of the season. In November 2010, he signed with the Kitsap Pumas of the Professional Arena Soccer League.

== Coaching ==
In 2006, Reese served as the goalkeeper coach for the Oregon State Beavers women's soccer team. He is also the goalkeeper coach for Oregon's Olympic Development Program team. In 2008, he was an assistant coach with Concordia University, Portland.
