= Miguel Guante =

American soccer player

Personal information
- Full name: Miguel Guante-Vasquez
- Date of birth: August 24, 1984 (age 42)
- Place of birth: Augusta, Georgia, United States
- Height: 5 ft 9 in (1.75 m)
- Positions: Defender; midfielder

Youth career
- 2002–2005: Portland Pilots

Senior career*
Years	Team	Apps	(Gls)
2004–2005	Boulder Rapids Reserve	20	(2)
2006	FC Dallas	0	(0)
2007	Miami FC	7	(0)
2008	Portland Timbers	28	(2)
2009	Portland Timbers U23s	8	(1)
- * Club domestic league appearances and goals as of 5 June 2009

Miguel Guante (born August 24, 1984, in Augusta, Georgia) is an American soccer player of Puerto Rican heritage.

== Career ==
=== College and amateur ===
Guante played college soccer at the University of Portland, and played for the Boulder Rapids Reserves in the USL Premier Development League in 2004 and 2005.

=== Professional ===
Guante was drafted in the first round (8th overall) of the 2006 MLS Supplemental Draft by FC Dallas. Dallas waived him in April 2007 and Miami FC of the USL First Division signed him. In 2008, he moved to the Portland Timbers of the USL First Division.

In 2009, Guante signed with Portland's development team, Portland Timbers U23s, for its inaugural campaign in the USL Premier Development League

=== International ===
The Puerto Rican Football association called-up Guante for the Puerto Rico national football team that played against Honduras in the 2010 World Cup qualifier.

== Personal ==
Guante is a distant cousin of Vancouver Whitecaps forward Blas Pérez.
