= Josh Wicks =

American soccer player (born 1983)

Personal information
- Full name: Joshua Myiah Wicks
- Date of birth: November 1, 1983 (age 43)
- Place of birth: Landstuhl, West Germany
- Height: 6 ft 3 in (1.91 m)
- Position: Goalkeeper

College career
Years	Team	Apps	(Gls)
2001–2004	Bakersfield Roadrunners		

Senior career*
Years	Team	Apps	(Gls)
2003	Des Moines Menace	8	(0)
2005–2006	Vancouver Whitecaps	16	(0)
2007	Portland Timbers	27	(0)
2007	AFC Leopards	4	(0)
2008	LA Galaxy	6	(0)
2009–2010	D.C. United	19	(0)
2010–2012	IFK Mariehamn	26	(0)
2012–2014	Thór	22	(0)
2014–2016	AFC United	71	(0)
2017–2018	IK Sirius	26	(0)
2020–2021	AFC Eskilstuna	29	(0)
2022–2024	Syrianska FC		
- * Club domestic league appearances and goals

Joshua Myiah Wicks (born November 1, 1983) is an American soccer player who plays as a goalkeeper.

== Career ==
=== Early life and amateur ===
Wicks was born on a US Army base, Landstuhl Regional Medical Center, in Landstuhl, Germany, but grew up in San Bernardino, California. He played college soccer for Cal State Bakersfield, and during his collegiate off-season Wicks played one summer with Des Moines Menace in the USL Premier Development League.

=== Professional ===
In 2005, his first year as a professional, Wicks enjoyed a successful campaign with Vancouver Whitecaps. Wicks began the season as the backup to Mike Franks. However, injuries to the number one keeper allowed him to appear in 13 games, including two games in the playoffs. Wicks allowed only 0.55 goals per game and his overall record was five wins, four losses, and four ties. He also recorded seven shutouts, including both playoff games.

Wicks re-signed for the Caps in 2006 and served as backup to Tony Caig. He also helped the Caps win their first USL First Division Championship by beating the Rochester Raging Rhinos 3–0.

In March 2007, Wicks signed with the Portland Timbers as one of two goalkeepers. For the season, he recorded a .603 GAA with 14 shutouts in 27 games (all league highs), earning him Goalkeeper of the Year honors. He also delivered 2 assists (good for 3rd best on the team) from his booming goal kicks.

Wicks had been on trial with Los Angeles Galaxy during the club's pre-season, featuring in the inaugural Pan-Pacific Championship in Hawaii, and featuring on their Asian tour in China and Hong Kong. Having impressed Galaxy coach Ruud Gullit with his performances, Wicks signed a full professional contract with Galaxy on March 26, 2008. He made his MLS debut on 30 August 2008 against New England Revolution, coming on as a second-half substitute for Steve Cronin, who had suffered an injury.

Wicks was traded to D.C. United in return for a conditional 4th round 2010 MLS SuperDraft pick. He made his debut for United against his former club on 22 March 2009 in the 2009 MLS Season opener for both clubs.

Wicks was released by D.C. United on April 16, 2010 and subsequently moved to Finland when he signed for Veikkausliiga club IFK Mariehamn. He made his debut for Mariehamn on January 18, 2011, in a 4–0 victory over FC Haka in the Finnish League Cup. In his first season with the club he was named best player of the entire league by Finnish sports magazine Veikaaja. On 15 July Joshua signed with Þór Akureyri in the 1st division in Iceland.

In 2014, Wicks signed with AFC United in the Swedish Division 1 Norra. Wicks helped AFC to two promotions in his three years with the club, before leaving for a one-year deal with fellow Allsvenskan newcomers IK Sirius before the 2017 season. After the season, Wicks signed a new two-year deal with Sirius. On 19 April 2018, Sirius announced that Wicks would have his contract terminated for violation of team rules.

Wicks announced his retirement on Instagram on December 29, 2024.

=== Trouble in DC ===
On August 29, 2009, during a game against the Chicago Fire, Wicks confronted teammate Marc Burch after Burch failed to clear out of the box during a Fire free-kick. A shoving match ensued; Wicks was both praised and criticized for the incident.

Days later, on September 2, 2009, during the 2009 US Open Cup final against Seattle Sounders FC, he intentionally stomped on an opponent, Fredy Montero, after Montero scored a goal against him. His act earned a red card and his team went on to lose the game 2–1, and the cup. He was subsequently suspended for 5 future Open Cup games.

== Honors ==
=== Vancouver Whitecaps ===
- USL First Division Championship (1): 2006

=== Individual ===
- USL First Division Goalkeeper of the Year: 2007
