= Shaun Higgins (soccer) =

American soccer player (born 1978)

Personal information
- Full name: Shaun Higgins
- Date of birth: October 17, 1978 (age 48)
- Place of birth: Redlands, California, United States
- Height: 5 ft 8 in (1.73 m)
- Position: Midfielder

Youth career
- 1996–2000: Fullerton Titans

Senior career*
Years	Team	Apps	(Gls)
2001–2005	Orange County Blue Star		
2005	Portland Timbers	16	(2)
2006	Orange County Blue Star	10	(0)
2006	Chivas USA	0	(0)
2007–2009	Portland Timbers	56	(2)
- * Club domestic league appearances and goals as of 5 December 2009

Shaun Higgins (born October 17, 1978, in Redlands, California) is a professional soccer agent and a retired American soccer player. He is currently President and CEO of PRO Football Consultants, a firm he founded that represents professional soccer players in the United States, Europe, and Mexico.

== Career ==
=== College and amateur ===
Higgins played college soccer at California State University, Fullerton from 1996 to 2000, and four seasons with Orange County Blue Star in the USL Premier Development League, helping them to the PDL national semi-finals in 2004 and 2006.

=== Professional ===
Higgins signed with the Portland Timbers in the USL First Division in 2005, playing 16 games (934 minutes) in his rookie season. He scored two goals during the season, both against Northwest rivals the Seattle Sounders, was named to the USL First Division Team of the Week for Week 18.

Higgins did not re-sign with the Timbers in 2006, and instead played one more campaign in the USL Premier Development League with Orange County Blue Star while training with Chivas USA's reserve team, appearing in six MLS Reserve Division games without seeing any first-team action.

In 2007, Higgins rejoined the Timbers and was mostly in the starting line-up. Higgins played primarily at left midfield, but was known as a utility player who can also fill in as outside defender. He retired from the Timbers on December 7, 2009, having played 56 games and scored two goals during his three years with the team.

=== Professional career ===
Higgins founded PRO Football Consultants (PRO FC) in December 2009. Higgins turned his firm into one of the premier soccer agencies in the United States, with a staff of former professional soccer players. He represents the #1 goalscorer in MLS history Chris Wondolowski, and has represented top five goalscorer in MLS history Kei Kamara, #1 defender in MLS history Chad Marshall, #1 holding midfielder in MLS history Osvaldo Alonso, 2018 MLS Defender of the Year Aaron Long, and multiple US Men's National Team and US Youth National Team players. Higgins has completed multiple transfers to and from the English Premier League, English Championship, German Bundesliga, and Danish Superliga.

In 2013, Higgins represented Robbie Rogers, in what was the first openly gay male athlete contract in North American major sports. This was later detailed in Rogers's book, Coming Out to Play.

PRO Football Consultants has since expanded into Mexico with Claudio Suarez ("El Emperador"), the all-time leader in appearances for the Mexico National Team. The company has also started a firm in Denmark with John Jensen, who famously scored the game-winning goal for Denmark in the final of the 1992 European Championships versus Germany.
