= Rodrigo Ríos =

Chilean footballer and coach (born 1977)

Personal information
- Full name: Rodrigo Andrés Ríos Rodríguez
- Date of birth: January 25, 1977 (age 49)
- Place of birth: Santiago, Chile
- Height: 5 ft 11 in (1.80 m)
- Position: Midfielder

Youth career
- 1987–1996: Universidad Católica

Senior career*
Years	Team	Apps	(Gls)
1996–2000	Universidad Católica		
1997	→ Municipal Las Condes (loan)	–	(–)
2001	Everton		(6)
2002	Palestino	34	(12)
2003–2004	Unión Española	51	(17)
2005–2008	Atlanta Silverbacks	109	(9)

International career
1996	Chile U20	8	(1)
2000	Chile U23	6	(1)

Managerial career
- 2012–2016: Norcross Soccer Academy
- 2016–2020: Atlanta United (youth)
- 2021–2024: Austin FC (assistant)
- 2025: FC Dallas (assistant)
- * Club domestic league appearances and goals

Rodrigo Andrés Ríos Rodríguez (born 25 January 1977) is a Chilean former football midfielder.

== Club career ==
Ríos was born in Santiago, Chile. In 1987, he joined the Universidad Católica youth system. In February 1996, he entered his first game with the Catolica first team in the Primera División de Chile. In 2001, he moved to Everton de Viña del Mar before moving to Palestino in 2002. From 2003 to 2004, he played for Unión Española. In 2005, he moved to the United States where he signed with the Atlanta Silverbacks in the USL First Division. He was a 2005 and 2006 second team All Star. The Silverbacks withdrew from the league following the 2008 season.

== International career ==
In 1996, Ríos earned eight caps with the Chilean U-20 national team. In 2000, he played six games, scoring one goal, with the U-23 team during qualification for the 2000 Summer Olympics. However, he was not selected for the final roster.

== Coaching career ==
The Silverbacks club re-emerged in the North American Soccer League for the 2011 season. In preparation, the Silverbacks hired Ríos as Director of Soccer on December 18, 2010.

In 2012, Rios started coaching Youth Soccer at Norcross Soccer Academy, he was awarded Girls Academy "Coach of the year" for the state of Georgia in 2013. He currently is USSF 'A' License Coach. In June 2016, he joined Atlanta United as an Academy Coach.

He served as the assistant coach for Austin FC in the Major League Soccer from 2021 to 2024.

In January 2025, FC Dallas announced that Ríos had joined the coaching staff of Eric Quill as a first team assistant.
