= Neil Dombrowski =

American soccer player

Personal information
- Date of birth: March 19, 1984 (age 42)
- Place of birth: West Allis, Wisconsin, United States
- Height: 6 ft 0 in (1.83 m)
- Position: Midfielder

College career
Years	Team	Apps	(Gls)
2002–2005	Milwaukee Panthers		

Senior career*
Years	Team	Apps	(Gls)
2005	Chicago Fire Premier	11	(0)
2006	Rochester Raging Rhinos	6	(0)
2007–2008	Portland Timbers	32	(1)
- * Club domestic league appearances and goals as of 1 October 08

Neil Dombrowski (born March 19, 1984, in West Allis, Wisconsin) is an American soccer player, who last played for the Portland Timbers of the USL First Division.

== Youth ==
Dombrowski, one of four brothers who play professional soccer, grew up in Wisconsin, attending Nathan Hale High School. In high school, he was three time All Conference and led his team in scoring as a senior. He then attended the University of Wisconsin–Milwaukee, playing on the men's soccer team from 2002 to 2005. He played a total of 83 games over his four-year career, leading the team in goals and points his senior season.

== Professional ==
In 2005, Dombrowski spent the collegiate off season with the Chicago Fire Premier of the fourth division Premier Development League. In 2006, the Milwaukee Wave of the Major Indoor Soccer League selected Dombrowski in the first round (seventh overall) in the MISL Draft, but he did not sign with the Wave. Instead, on April 11, 2006, he signed with the Rochester Raging Rhinos of the USL First Division. In 2007, he moved to the Portland Timbers. He played nineteen games, but suffered a season ending knee injury on August 26. He was a regular with the Timbers in 2008, but did not sign with the team in 2009.

== Personal ==
Neil is one of the Dombrowski brothers, all of whom are also professional soccer players: Scott Dombrowski, Zeke Dombrowski, Tighe Dombrowski and Chad Dombrowski.
