= Tom Taylor (footballer, born 1985) =

English footballer

Personal information
- Date of birth: 10 February 1985 (age 41)
- Place of birth: Chatham, England
- Position: Midfielder

Youth career
- 1994–2002: Walsall
- 2002–2004: Derby County

Senior career*
Years	Team	Apps	(Gls)
2005	Viking		
2005–2006	Grimsby Town	0	(0)
2006–2007	Walsall	0	(0)
2007	→ Halesowen Town (loan)	10	(2)
2007	Portland Timbers	5	(0)
2008	Wrexham	0	(0)
2009	Real Maryland Monarchs	18	(2)
2011	Wilmington Hammerheads	6	(0)
Total		39	(4)
- * Club domestic league appearances and goals

Tom Taylor (born 10 February 1985) is an English football coach and retired player.

== Playing career ==
Taylor came up through the ranks in the youth academies of English clubs Walsall and Derby County, but made his professional debut in Norway at the age of 19 after being signed by Viking manager Roy Hodgson.

After brief spells at Grimsby Town, Walsall and a one-month loan at non-League side Halesowen Town in England, Taylor moved to the United States to play with the Portland Timbers of the USL First Division in 2007.

Moving back to the UK, Taylor was signed by Wrexham manager Brian Little in August 2008, but only saw limited action in the Wrexham squad as the club struggled in the Conference National.

Taylor was announced as a Real Maryland Monarchs player on 10 February 2009, scoring in his first game for the Monarchs, and helping the Monarchs reach the play-offs for the first time in their history.

Taylor signed for Wilmington Hammerheads in February 2011, his final club as a player.

== Coaching career ==
Taylor is a Director of Pro Soccer Consulting Ltd in the USA.
