= Troy Ready =

American soccer player (born 1980)

Personal information
- Full name: Troy Vincent Ready
- Date of birth: May 15, 1980 (age 46)
- Place of birth: Spokane, Washington, U.S.
- Height: 5 ft 9 in (1.75 m)
- Position: Midfielder

Youth career
- 1999–2003: Washington Huskies

Senior career*
Years	Team	Apps	(Gls)
–2004	Spokane Shadow		
2005	Cascade Surge	11	(0)
2006–2008	Portland Timbers	20	(0)
2009–2013	Vakhsh Qurghonteppa		

Managerial career
- 2017–: Vancouver Victory
- * Club domestic league appearances and goals as of 29 October 2015

Troy Ready (born May 15, 1980) is an American former soccer player who played as a midfielder and the current head coach of Vancouver Victory. After his professional career with the Timbers, Ready moved to Tajikistan where he played professionally for Vakhsh Qurghonteppa and later headed up the development of football in Tajikistan, before returning to Portland Timbers as a chaplain.

== Career ==
=== Youth ===
Ready attended Mead Senior High School. While in high school, he played for the Spokane Shadow of the USISL, continuing with the team through his collegiate career. In 1999, he entered the University of Washington where he played on the men's soccer team. He redshirted his junior season after breaking his leg during the 2001 pre-season.

=== Professional ===
On December 17, 2003, the Seattle Sounders selected Ready in the first round of the USL First Division draft. The Sounders did not sign him as he decided to pursue trials with teams in Norway. Ready was wanted by Clubs IK Start and Skeid of the Norway's Professional League, but was unable to obtain a work permit. At the end of this year, he returned to the Spokane Shadow. Ready played with the Shadow for eight years and tallied more appearances than anyone in club history. Premier Development League. In 2005, he moved to the Cascade Surge of the PDL, playing eleven games. On March 30, 2006, Ready signed with the Portland Timbers of the USL First Division. He played three seasons before needing a surgery. Ready moved to Tajikistan in 2009, signing with Vakhsh Qurghonteppa with whom he won the Tajik League with in 2009, before returning to the US after four seasons.

=== Administrative ===
In the autumn of 2010, Ready struck a deal with his former club Portland Timbers, to supply Vakhsh's youth teams with sports equipment. In February 2013, Ready was appointed as Technical Director of the Tajikistan Football Federation. In this role, Ready has expanded the number of youth clubs to 18, 12 male and 6 female, and also opened a national goalkeeper academy.

=== Managerial ===
On 16 February 2017, Ready was appointed as manager of Evergreen Premier League side Vancouver Victory.

== Honors ==
Vakhsh Qurghonteppa

- Tajik League (1): 2009
