= Chris Bagley =

American soccer player (born 1980)

Personal information
- Full name: Christopher William Bagley
- Date of birth: May 20, 1980 (age 46)
- Place of birth: Weymouth, Massachusetts, United States
- Height: 6 ft 0 in (1.83 m)
- Position: Forward

Youth career
- 1998–2001: St. Anselm Hawks

Senior career*
Years	Team	Apps	(Gls)
2002	Wilmington Hammerheads	17	(4)
2003–2004	Charleston Battery	45	(5)
2003	→ New England Revolution (loan)	4	(0)
2004–2006	Wilmington Hammerheads	48	(27)
2006	→ Rochester Rhinos (loan)	8	(1)
2007–2008	Portland Timbers	51	(3)
2009	Wilmington Hammerheads	9	(1)
2011	Wilmington Hammerheads	3	(0)
- * Club domestic league appearances and goals as of 11 October 2009

Chris Bagley (born May 20, 1980, in Weymouth, Massachusetts) is an American former soccer player.

== Career ==
=== College and amateur ===
Bagley played club soccer for South Shore United and Boston Lightning. He played college soccer at Saint Anselm College, where he earned an undergraduate degree in Criminal Justice. While at Saint Anselm, Bagley earned All-American honors twice and was voted Northeast Ten Conference player of the Year in both 2000 and 2001. He was the only player in Saint Anselm history to earn First-Team All-Conference honors in each of his four years, and played a program-record 83 career games, winning three NE10 Championships and winning tournament Most Valuable Player honors as a senior. He concluded collegiate career as the NE 10's all-time top scorer with 71 goals.

Bagley played for the Decatur Football Club an amateur over-30 men's squad. (D.F.C.)

=== Professional ===
Bagley made his professional debut with the Wilmington Hammerheads of USL Select in 2002. He then played for the Charleston Battery of the USL A-League in 2003, winning the A-League Championship.

On October 10, 2003, Bagley signed with the New England Revolution of Major League Soccer as a "Developmental Player," on loan from the Hammerheads. He made his Revolution debut the following day, coming on as a 61st minute substitute for Pat Noonan against D.C. United. He drew a penalty in the match, which was subsequently converted by Steve Ralston in the 94th minute of play. The penalty gave the Revolution a 1-0 victory in the match, and clinched a spot for the club in the 2003 MLS Cup Playoffs. Bagley appeared as a substitute for Darío Fabbro in each of the Revolution's final two matches of the season, home and away ties against the MetroStars, and also appeared as an 87th-minute substitute for Jason Moore in the home tie of the Eastern Conference Semifinal, again against the MetroStars.

Bagley would go on to split time between the Hammerheads and Battery, scoring 17 goals and recording five assists in 27 games with Wilmington in 2005 and 2006. Bagley scored in both the home and away legs of the 2005 United Soccer Leagues playoffs against the Western Mass Pioneers. During the 2006 season he was named to the USL-2 All-League First Team, and was a finalist for the USL Second Division MVP award.

While with the Hammerheads, Bagley also spent time on loan to the Rochester Raging Rhinos of the USL First Division for 10 games in 2006 scoring 1 goal while being part of a team that lost to the Vancouver Whitecaps 3–0 in the USL First Division Championship game.

Bagley signed with the USL First Division side Portland Timbers in 2007. and made 51 appearances over the course of the 2007 and 2008 seasons, scoring three goals and recording five assists. Bagley returned to the Hammerheads for the 2009 season to act as a player and assistant coach.

== Personal ==
Bagley wears the number 33 shirt because of one of his sporting idols, the NBA basketball player Larry Bird. His favorite hobbies include golf, the New England Patriots, and the Boston Red Sox. Bagley, now retired, lives in Wilmington, NC with his family.

His personal motto is "YOLO".
