= Tom Poltl =

American soccer player and coach

Personal information
- Full name: Thomas Poltl
- Date of birth: September 21, 1977 (age 49)
- Place of birth: San Marcos, California, U.S.
- Height: 5 ft 6 in (1.68 m)
- Position: Midfielder

Youth career
- 1995–1998: UCLA Bruins

Senior career*
Years	Team	Apps	(Gls)
1999–2000	Boston Bulldogs	53	(4)
2000	Cape Cod Crusaders	1	(1)
2002–2004	Orange County Blue Star		
2005–2009	Portland Timbers	98	(2)

International career
1995–1997	United States U-20	11	(0)

Managerial career
- 2002–2004: Orange County Blue Star
- * Club domestic league appearances and goals

Tom Poltl (born September 21, 1977) is an American retired soccer midfielder who was a member of the United States U-20 men's national soccer team at the 1997 FIFA World Youth Championship.

== Career ==
=== Youth ===
Poltl attended San Marcos High School, and played college soccer at UCLA from 1995 to 1998. In 1997, Poltl was part of the Bruins team which won the NCAA Men's Soccer Championship over the Virginia Cavaliers.

=== Professional ===
In February 1999, the Colorado Rapids selected Poltl in the second round (20th overall) of the MLS College Draft. Soon after, the San Francisco Bay Seals of the USL A-League selected Poltl in the second round (forty-ninth overall) in the A-League draft. The Rapids did not sign him, and the Seals traded his rights to the Boston Bulldogs of the A-League, with whom he spent the 1999 and 2000 seasons.

In 2002 Poltl signed as a player-coach with the Orange County Blue Star of the fourth division USL Premier Development League. On April 20, 2005, he moved to the Portland Timbers of the USL First Division. He played over 100 games for Portland in his five years with club, leading his team to the 2009 USL First Division championship, before being released on December 7, 2009.

=== International ===
Between 1995 and 1997, Poltl earned eleven caps with the U.S. U-20 national team. In 1997, he was a member of the U.S. team at the 1997 FIFA World Youth Championship. He played one game, a 3–0 loss to Uruguay in the Round of 16.
