= Andrew Gregor =

American soccer player

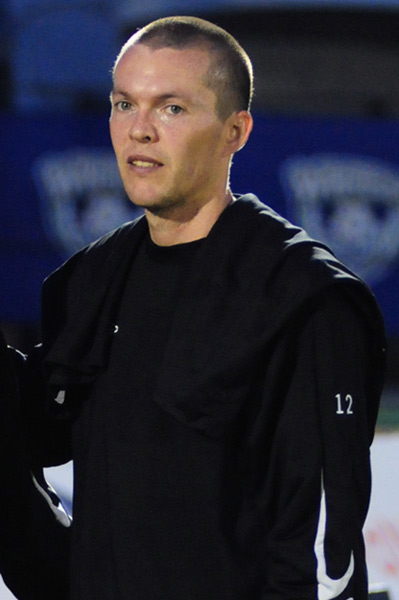

Personal information
- Full name: Andrew Gregor
- Date of birth: November 22, 1975 (age 50)
- Place of birth: Syracuse, New York, U.S.
- Height: 5 ft 11 in (1.80 m)
- Position: Midfielder

College career
Years	Team	Apps	(Gls)
1994–1997	Portland Pilots		

Senior career*
Years	Team	Apps	(Gls)
1998	Columbus Crew	10	(0)
1998	→ MLS Pro-40 (loan)	6	(0)
1999–2000	Seattle Sounders	39	(11)
2001	Kansas City Wizards	13	(0)
2001	→ Pittsburgh Riverhounds (loan)	2	(0)
2001	→ Seattle Sounders (loan)	3	(0)
2002	Seattle Sounders	46	(16)
2002–2003	Cleveland Crunch (indoor)	13	(0)
2004	Vancouver Whitecaps	1	(0)
2004	Orange County Blue Star	1	(0)
2004	Portland Timbers	13	(2)
2005–2006	Seattle Sounders	39	(8)
2007–2008	Portland Timbers	24	(8)
2008–2009	Rochester Rhinos	38	(4)

Managerial career
- 2009–2012: Pacific Boxers (assistant)
- 2014: Portland Timbers U23 (assistant)
- 2015: Portland Timbers 2 (assistant)
- 2016–2017: Portland Timbers 2
- 2018–2020: Portland Timbers 2 (assistant)
- 2023–: Minnesota United (director of scouting)
- * Club domestic league appearances and goals as of January 6, 2016

Andrew Gregor (born November 22, 1975) is an American retired soccer midfielder who played professionally in Major League Soccer, the USL First Division, the USL Premier Development League and Major Indoor Soccer League. He is now the director of scouting for Major League Soccer club Minnesota United.

He began his professional career in the Major League Soccer with the Columbus Crew, but due to restricted appearances at the highest level of American soccer he became a mainstay in the USL First Division, playing in the league for an entire decade. Gregor is noted for being one of the few players to have played for all three clubs from the Pacific Northwest region. Most of his achievements in the league derived from the Northwest clubs. His major achievements included winning the USL Championship, Commissioner's Cup, and receiving All-League honors on four separate occasions in his career. In February, 2010 he was ranked 12th in the USL First Division Top 25 of the Decade, which announced a list of the best and most influential players of the previous decade.

== Career ==
=== Youth and college ===
Gregor grew up in Portland, Oregon, playing for the West Villa F.C. in 1988 and moving to F.C. Portland youth club beginning in 1991. In 1994, Gregor and his F.C. Portland club won the USYSA U-18 national championship with Gregor taking MVP honors. In addition to playing with F.C. Portland, Gregor played for Sunset High School boys team, being a two-time, all-state selection. In 1993, he was selected as the Oregon 4A Co-Player of the Year. Gregor attended the University of Portland where he was a four-year starter on the men's soccer team. During his four years, he started 69 of 70 games for the Pilots.

=== Professional ===
The Columbus Crew of Major League Soccer (MLS) selected Gregor in the second round (21st overall) in the 1998 MLS College Draft. He played ten games, but was released at the end of the season. Gregor then signed with the Seattle Sounders of the USL A-League.

Gregor returned to MLS when the Kansas City Wizards picked him in the second round (24th overall) of the 2001 MLS SuperDraft. He played thirteen games in 2001, mostly as a substitute. As a result, the Wizards sent him on loan to the Pittsburgh Riverhounds and Seattle Sounders. The Wizards released Gregor and he signed with the Sounders for the 2002 season. Gregor had an excellent season, scoring nine goals and earning first team All Star recognition. On November 14, 2002, the Cleveland Crunch signed Gregor to a two-year contract., but he played only thirteen games and was released at the end of the season.

Gregor returned to the Sounders for the 2003 season, where he posted a career high seven assists, along with seven goals, once again earning first team All Star recognition. In 2004, the Vancouver Whitecaps signed Gregor as a free agent. He played one game and was released by the team. He then signed with the Portland Timbers in June and played thirteen games with them. In Portland he managed to claim the club's first piece of silverware by leading the Timbers to a regular season championship. On March 1, 2005, Gregor returned to the Seattle Sounders where he won his first USL Championship, which marked the third USL championship in the franchise's history. The following season, he recorded five goals and five assists which earned him a first team All Star selection. In 2007, he expressed an interest in returning to Portland to complete his sociology degree at the University of Portland. As a result, the Sounders released him and he signed with the Portland Timbers. In 2007, he played twenty-four games with the Timbers, earning first team All Star recognition for the fourth time in his career.

In 2008, he began the season as the captain of the Timbers, but on 9 July was traded to the Rochester Rhinos in a complicated three team deal which sent Chase Harrison of the Rhinos and Jamil Walker of the Carolina RailHawks to the Timbers in the exchange for Gregor. During his tenure in Rochester he managed to lead the Rhinos into the playoffs by finishing fourth in the standings. In the club's playoff run the Rhinos defeated the Charleston Battery in the quarterfinals to advance to the semifinals. There the Rhinos were defeated by the Puerto Rico Islanders on a 3-2 aggregate on goals. The following season Gregor led the Rhinos to a sixth-place finish in the standings enough to clinch a playoff spot. In the postseason the Rhinos were eliminated in the quarterfinals by the Islanders once again on a 5-3 aggregate on goals. On January 19, 2010, after 12 years of professional soccer, Gregor announced his retirement from the game.

=== International ===
Gregor played for several years on the U.S. youth teams. In 1992 and 1993, he was with the U-18 national team before moving to the U-20 national team. In 1997, he was the captain of the U.S. team which took third place at the World University Games.

=== Coaching ===
Gregor was named head coach of Portland Timbers 2 on January 6, 2016. He was an assistant coach to Jay Vidovich for Timbers 2 in 2015.

In May 2023, Gregor was named director of scouting for Major League Soccer club Minnesota United.

== Futsal ==
Gregor has also appeared with the U.S. Futsal team. In 2003, he was part of the U.S. team in an exhibition tournament in Anaheim, California. In 2006, Gregor played several games with the U.S. Futsal team as it prepared for the 2007 Pan American Games. In June 2007, Gregor was part of the U.S. team in a tour of Spain.

== Honors ==
=== Seattle Sounders ===
- USL First Division Championship (1): 2005
- USL First Division Pacific Division Champions (3): 2000, 2002, 2003
- Cascadia Cup (1): 2006
