= Justin Thompson (soccer) =

Canadian soccer player

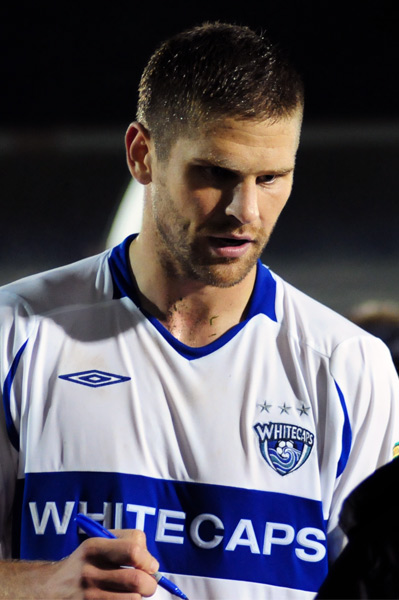

Personal information
- Full name: Justin Thompson
- Date of birth: January 9, 1981 (age 45)
- Place of birth: Prince Rupert, British Columbia, Canada
- Height: 6 ft 1 in (1.85 m)
- Position: Defender

Youth career
- 2001–2003: Fairfield Stags

Senior career*
Years	Team	Apps	(Gls)
2003–2004	Bury	1	(0)
2004	Vancouver Whitecaps	15	(0)
2004–2005	Hornchurch		
2005	Virginia Beach Mariners	11	(0)
2005–2007	Worcester City	73	(5)
2007–2008	Portland Timbers	47	(3)
2009	Vancouver Whitecaps	4	(0)
2009–2010	→ West Van FC (loan)	7	(0)

International career
2000–2001	Canada U-18	7	(0)
2000–2001	Canada U-20	10	(0)
2002–2004	Canada U-23	8	(0)
- * Club domestic league appearances and goals

Justin Thompson (born January 9, 1981, in Prince Rupert, British Columbia) is a Canadian retired soccer defender who played professionally in the United States, Canada and England. He was a member of the Canada U-20 men's national soccer team at the 2001 FIFA World Youth Championship.

== Career ==
=== College ===
Thompson played college soccer for Fairfield University in Fairfield, Connecticut, from 2001 to 2003, where he captained the Stags during his final two years. In 2002, the NSCAA selected him as a Regional All-American.

=== Professional ===
Thompson started his career with Bury in England, and spent the next few years bouncing backward and forward from the UK to North America across the summer and winter seasons, from Vancouver Whitecaps to Hornchurch to Virginia Beach Mariners to Worcester City. In two seasons with Worcester City, Thompson made 73 league appearances. In total, he made 97 appearances in all competitions. Thompson joined USL First Division side Portland Timbers in April 2007. On 3 December 2008, he returned to the Vancouver Whitecaps. On 31 March 2010, Thompson played his first game for West Van FC in the Imperial Cup.

=== International ===
Thompson was a member of Canada's U-18, U-20 and U-23 National Teams. In 2001, he was a member of the Canadian U-20 team which finished first in Group A at the 2001 CONCACAF Under-20 Qualification Tournament to qualify for the 2001 FIFA World Youth Championship in Argentina. Thompson made his Canadian Olympic (U-23) team debut in May 2002 and earned six caps with the team in 2004 Olympic qualifying matches.

== Personal ==
Justin founded the ACT Sports Group in 2003 where he is involved in a number of soccer-related activities, including the organization of team tours from North America to Europe and the designing and overseeing of soccer camps in the UK, as well as the coordination of international professional player transfers. Thompson graduated with a B.S. in Finance from the Fairfield University Dolan School of Business.
