= David Hague =

English footballer

David Hague (born 22 February 1982) is an English footballer from Jarrow in England.

== Career ==
He played college soccer at Tyler Junior College before transferring to Grand Canyon University in Phoenix, Arizona. At Tyler Junior college, Hague played under Coach Steve Clements and had two injury interrupted years although still managed to play his part as the team finished in the top 10 NJCAA for both years he was there. His highest goal tally in two years was 10 goals in his sophomore year. Grand Canyon took Hague from Junior college and he reached his full potential in his senior year. Hague had one of the best offensive seasons recorded at any level of college soccer. GCU finished 14-6 and Hague finished the season with 33 goals and 7 assists. He was the highest goalscorer in the nation and also recorded a record 5 hat-tricks in a single season. This total was made even better as he played only 18 games.

He was undrafted out of college but played and signed with the Portland Timbers of the USL for the 2007 Season. Hague had some success at Portland finishing third on the squad in scoring in his rookie campaign. He compiled 6 starts and 786 minutes for an output of 4 goals and 2 assists. He also recorded a 20-minute hat-trick vs California on 15 July that year.

After playing for the Portland, where Hague was nominated for rookie of the year, Hague went to Uruguay to play for Danubio F.C.
