= Bryan Jordan =

American former soccer player

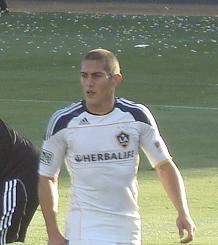
- Jordan with Los Angeles Galaxy in May 2010

Personal information
- Full name: Bryan Philip Jordan
- Date of birth: September 13, 1985 (age 41)
- Place of birth: Pasadena, California, United States
- Height: 5 ft 8 in (1.73 m)
- Positions: Winger; full back; forward

Youth career
- 2003–2006: Oregon State Beavers

Senior career*
Years	Team	Apps	(Gls)
2006	San Fernando Valley Quakes	7	(0)
2007	Portland Timbers	26	(5)
2008–2012	Los Angeles Galaxy	56	(2)
2008	→ Portland Timbers (loan)	8	(3)
2013	San Antonio Scorpions	8	(1)
2013–2014	BSV Schwarz-Weiß Rehden	4	(0)

International career
2008	United States U23	1	(0)
- * Club domestic league appearances and goals

Bryan Philip Jordan (born September 13, 1985) is an American former soccer player.

== Career ==
=== Youth and college ===
Jordan graduated from Temple City High School in Temple City, California (the same school as US men's national team veteran Jimmy Conrad) in 2003, having registered 46 goals and 28 assists in his career, and set the school record for goals with 22 in his senior year.

At Oregon State University, Jordan was an invaluable member of the Beavers' strike force, appearing in over 50 games since 2003, and being named to the Pac-10 All-Academic first team in both 2004 and 2005.

=== Professional ===
During his college years Jordan played for the San Fernando Valley Quakes in the USL Premier Development League, before being picked up by Portland Timbers of the USL First Division prior to their 2007 campaign. Jordan scored five goals in 26 appearances for the Timbers, helping them to the semi-finals of the USL-1 playoffs.

Jordan had been on trial with Los Angeles Galaxy during the club's pre-season, featuring in the inaugural Pan-Pacific Championship in Hawaii, and featuring on their Asian tour in China and Hong Kong. Having impressed Galaxy coach Ruud Gullit with his performances, Jordan signed a full professional contract with Galaxy on March 26, 2008.

He made his MLS debut on May 10, 2008, coming on as an 83rd-minute substitute for Joe Franchino in Galaxy's 2–1 loss to the New York Red Bulls, and made his first start (and scored his first goal) on 6 September 2008, against Real Salt Lake. Also during 2008 Jordan was loaned out to the Portland Timbers of the USL First Division for part of the season.

Jordan remained with Galaxy from 2008 and signed a new contract with the club on December 23, 2011.

At the end of the 2012 season, Los Angeles declined its 2013 contract option on Jordan and he chose to enter the 2012 MLS Re-Entry Draft. On December 14, 2012, Jordan was selected by San Jose Earthquakes in stage two of the draft.

In August 2013 Jordan signed with the German club BSV Schwarz-Weiß Rehden.

== International ==
Jordan made one appearance for the United States U-23 national team in a Toulon Tournament match against Ivory Coast.

== Honors ==
=== Los Angeles Galaxy ===
- MLS Cup (2): 2011, 2012
- Major League Soccer Supporters' Shield (2): 2010, 2011
