= Leonard Griffin (soccer) =

American soccer player and coach

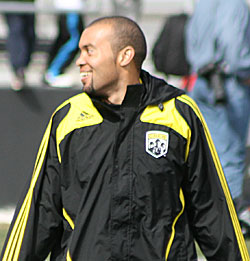
- Griffin in 2008

Personal information
- Full name: Leonard Griffin
- Date of birth: September 11, 1982 (age 44)
- Place of birth: Pasadena, California, United States
- Height: 6 ft 1 in (1.85 m)
- Position: Defender

College career
Years	Team	Apps	(Gls)
2000–2003	UCLA Bruins		

Senior career*
Years	Team	Apps	(Gls)
2003	Orange County Blue Star	18	(1)
2004–2006	Chicago Fire	18	(0)
2007	Portland Timbers	27	(2)
2007–2008	Columbus Crew	0	(0)
2008	Portland Timbers	29	(0)
2009	Los Angeles Galaxy	1	(0)
2009	→ Hollywood United Hitmen (loan)	2	(1)
2010	Austin Aztex	26	(2)
2011	Los Angeles Blues	13	(0)
Total		134	(6)

Managerial career
- 2008–2010: CSU San Bernardino (women's assistant)
- 2011–2012: Saint Mary's (assistant)
- 2013: California (assistant)
- 2014–2015: UCLA (assistant)
- 2016–2018: Portland (assistant)
- 2019–2020: San Francisco
- 2021: Grand Canyon
- 2022–: California
- * Club domestic league appearances and goals

Leonard Griffin (born September 11, 1982) is an American former soccer player. He currently serves as the head coach for the California men's soccer team.

== Career ==
=== College and amateur ===
Griffin attended Littlerock High School in Littlerock, California, and was a four-year letterman in soccer. He was a three-time first team All-League honoree, and as a senior, he was a Los Angeles Daily News first team All-Area honoree, and set the school single-season record for goals (24 goals).

Griffin played college soccer at the UCLA from 2000 to 2003. Griffin distinguished himself at the school, helping the team win a national championship in 2002, and being named an NCAA All-American in 2003.

During his college years he also played with Orange County Blue Star in the USL Premier Development League, where he played alongside Jürgen Klinsmann.

=== Professional ===
Upon graduating from UCLA, Griffin was drafted 11th overall in the 2004 MLS SuperDraft by the Fire. In his first year Griffin had trouble establishing himself in a single role, but instead played a variety of defensive positions for the Fire when needed, finishing with 330 minutes over 9 games. He saw 3 games for the Fire in 2005, and 6 in 2006. Griffin was waived by the Fire during the 2007 pre-season, and signed by USL First Division side Portland Timbers, joining former UCLA teammate and fellow defensive standout Scot Thompson.

In September 2007, the Columbus Crew acquired his rights from the Chicago Fire, in exchange for the Crew's natural fourth-round selection in the 2008 MLS Supplemental Draft. In April, he was waived by the Crew to make room for the addition of Gino Padula. He then rejoined the Timbers for the 2008 season.

Griffin was signed by Los Angeles Galaxy on January 7, 2009, but suffered an injury in pre-season which prevented him from playing. Upon his recovery, and with the MLS Reserve Division having been scrapped at the end of 2008, Galaxy loaned Griffin to the Hollywood United Hitmen of the USL Premier Development League for part of the 2009 PDL season, to regain his match fitness levels. He scored a goal on his debut for Hollywood, in a May 30 game against the BYU Cougars. In late February 2010 his option was picked up by Austin Aztex of the USSF Division 2.

Griffin stayed with Austin for the 2010 season. On March 24, 2011, Griffin transferred to Los Angeles Blues of the newly formed USL Pro league.

== Coaching ==
Griffin began his college coaching career as an assistant women's soccer coach for the Cal State San Bernardino Coyotes during the 2008 through 2010 seasons. He joined the Saint Mary's Gaels men's soccer program as an assistant men's coach in 2011 and 2012, helping lead the Gaels to a West Coast Conference championship and a quarterfinal appearance in the 2011 NCAA Division I Men's Soccer Tournament.

In 2015 he joined his alma mater as an assistant coach for the UCLA Bruins men's soccer team following a two-year stint as an assistant coach for the California Golden Bears men's soccer program. After two years at UCLA he was hired by the University of Portland in March 2016 and got a contract as an assistant coach of the Portland Pilots men's soccer team.

In April 2019, he was announced as the new head coach for the San Francisco Dons men's soccer team, replacing Eddie Soto who resigned as the prior month. He was also named the Boy's Director of Coaching at the San Francisco Elite Academy.

In May 2021, he was announced as the new head coach for the Grand Canyon Antelopes men's soccer team, replacing Schellas Hyndman who announced his retirement in January 2021.

Griffin would only stay at Grand Canyon for a year as he accepted the head coaching position at California in 2022.

== Personal ==
Leonard is the older brother of fellow professional soccer player Maxwell Griffin. His brother-in-law Spencer Thompson was also a professional soccer player who played for the Portland Timbers.
