= 2006 Portland Timbers season =

Portland Timbers
2006 season
- President: John Cunningham
- Head coach: Chris Agnello
- Stadium: PGE Park; Portland, Oregon
- USL-1: League: 11th Playoffs: Did not qualify
- U.S. Open Cup: Third round
- Cascadia Cup: 3rd
- Top goalscorer: League: Luke Kreamalmeyer (8 goals); All: Luke Kreamalmeyer (9 goals)
- Highest home attendance: 7,034 vs. MON (Aug 31)
- Lowest home attendance: 3,369 vs. TOR (May 21)
- Average home league attendance: 5,575
Home colors	Away colors

The 2006 Portland Timbers season was the 6th season for the Portland Timbers—the 3rd incarnation of a club to bear the Timbers name—of the now-defunct USL First Division, the second-tier league of the United States and Canada at the time.

== Preseason ==
April 1, 2006	Portland Timbers	2–0	Seattle Redhawks (NCAA)	Portland, Oregon
11:15 (PDT)	O. Bullen ?'; McAthy ?'	Report		Stadium: Merlo Field

April 1, 2006	Portland Timbers	1–1	Washington Huskies (NCAA)	Portland, Oregon
12:20 (PDT)	Ready ?'	Report	?'	Stadium: Merlo Field

April 12, 2006	Oregon State Beavers (NCAA)	1–2	Portland Timbers	Corvallis, Oregon
15:00 (PDT)	?'	Report	?' Alcaraz-Cuellar ?' Kreamalmeyer	Stadium: Paul Lorenz Field

April 15, 2006	Portland Pilots (NCAA)	0–3	Portland Timbers	Portland, Oregon
14:00 (PDT)		Report	45' Kreamalmeyer; 52' Miranda ?' McAthy	Stadium: Merlo Field

== Regular season ==
=== April ===
April 22, 2006 USL-1 / CC	Vancouver Whitecaps	1–0	Portland Timbers	Burnaby, British Columbia Canada
19:00 (PDT)	Gjertsen 17'	Report		Stadium: Swangard Stadium; Attendance: 5,722 (SO); Referee: Steve DePiero (Canada)

April 29, 2006 Friendly	Portland Timbers	2–0	Oregon State Beavers (NCAA)	Lake Oswego, Oregon
15:00 (PDT)	Alvarez 19'; Miranda 90'	Report		Stadium: Lake Oswego High School

=== May ===
May 1, 2006 USL-1 / CC	Portland Timbers	1–1	Vancouver Whitecaps	Portland, Oregon
19:00 (PDT)	Bartlomé 21'	Report	53' Donatelli	Stadium: PGE Park; Attendance: 5,448; Referee: Colin Arblaster (USA)

May 6, 2006 USL-1	Portland Timbers	2–1	Minnesota Thunder	Portland, Oregon
19:00 (PDT)	Gutierrez 31' (pen.); Ready 69'	Report	5' Knox	Stadium: PGE Park; Attendance: 4,449; Referee: Ben Chouaf (USA)

May 12, 2006 USL-1	Miami FC	3–2	Portland Timbers	Olympia Heights, Florida
16:30 (PDT)	Romário 13', 89'; Fraser 51'	Report	7' Chisoni; 86' (pen.) Alcaraz-Cuellar	Stadium: Tropical Park Stadium; Attendance: 2,433; Referee: Colin Tait (USA)

May 14, 2006 USL-1	Puerto Rico Islanders	3–1	Portland Timbers	Bayamón, Puerto Rico
14:00 (PDT)	Norkus 2', 22'; González 14'	Report	67' Alvarez	Stadium: Juan Ramón Loubriel Stadium; Attendance: 2,975; Referee: Reggie Rutty (USA)

May 19, 2006 USL-1	Portland Timbers	0–1	Rochester Raging Rhinos	Portland, Oregon
19:00 (PDT)		Report	62' Delicâte	Stadium: PGE Park; Attendance: 3,875; Referee: Tim Weyland (USA)

May 21, 2006 USL-1	Portland Timbers	2–1	Toronto Lynx	Portland, Oregon
18:00 (PDT)	Kreamalmeyer 52'; O. Bullen 61'	Report	90' Neto	Stadium: PGE Park; Attendance: 3,369; Referee: Yader Reyes (USA)

May 27, 2006 USL-1	Minnesota Thunder	0–1	Portland Timbers	Blaine, Minnesota
17:35 (PDT)		Report	34' Alvarez	Stadium: National Sports Center; Attendance: 3,571; Referee: Marcel Yonan (USA)

=== June ===
June 2, 2006 USL-1 / CC	Seattle Sounders	0–0	Portland Timbers	Seattle
19:00 (PDT)		Report		Stadium: Qwest Field; Attendance: 2,251; Referee: Andres Pfefferkorn (USA)

June 3, 2006 USL-1 / CC	Portland Timbers	3–1	Seattle Sounders	Portland, Oregon
19:00 (PDT)	Gutierrez 14'; Chisoni 33'; Alcaraz-Cuellar 87'	Report	32' Scott	Stadium: PGE Park; Attendance: 6,149; Referee: Miguel Chicas (USA)

June 10, 2006 USL-1 / CC	Portland Timbers	0–0	Vancouver Whitecaps	Portland, Oregon
19:00 (PDT)		Report		Stadium: PGE Park; Attendance: 6,298; Referee: Fotis Bazakos (USA)

June 15, 2006 USL-1	Minnesota Thunder	1–2	Portland Timbers	Saint Paul, Minnesota
17:05 (PDT)	Alvino 47'	Report	14' Kreamalmeyer; 59' O. Bullen	Stadium: James Griffin Stadium; Attendance: 1,609; Referee: William Delois (USA)

June 17, 2006 USL-1	Rochester Raging Rhinos	2–2	Portland Timbers	Rochester, New York
16:35 (PDT)	Edozien 37'; Delicâte 89'	Report	60' Kreamalmeyer; 69' Thompson	Stadium: PAETEC Park; Attendance: 9,174; Referee: Bahij Salman (USA)

June 18, 2006 USL-1	Montreal Impact	0–0	Portland Timbers	Montréal, Québec Canada
13:00 (PDT)		Report		Stadium: Complexe sportif Claude-Robillard; Attendance: 9,273; Referee: Silviu Petrescu (Canada)

June 30, 2006 USL-1 / CC	Vancouver Whitecaps	3–0	Portland Timbers	Burnaby, British Columbia Canada
19:00 (PDT)	Testo 9', 63'; Donatelli 66'	Report		Stadium: Swangard Stadium; Attendance: 4,540; Referee: Carol Anne Chenard (Canada)

=== July ===
July 2, 2006 USL-1	Portland Timbers	0–1	Miami FC	Portland, Oregon
18:00 (PDT)		Report	41' (pen.) Sandoval	Stadium: PGE Park; Attendance: 6,116; Referee: Colin Arblaster (USA)

July 8, 2006 Friendly	Portland Timbers	1–1 (4–3 p)	Coventry City	Portland, Oregon
19:00 (PDT)	Alcaraz-Cuellar 67' (pen.)	Report	8' Tabb; (red card) 86' Thornton	Stadium: PGE Park; Attendance: 10,985; Referee: Yader Reyes (USA)
	Penalties
	Alcaraz-Cuellar (penalty scored); Poltl (penalty scored); Gutierrez (penalty scored); Alvarez (penalty scored)		(penalty scored) Osbourne; (penalty scored) Whing; (penalty scored) Davis; (penalty missed) McNamee; (penalty missed) Jørgensen

July 12, 2006 USOC 3rd Rd	Charleston Battery	3–1	Portland Timbers	Charleston, South Carolina
16:30 (PDT)	Hollingsworth 36', 87' (pen.); Glinton 78'	Report	5' Kreamalmeyer	Stadium: Blackbaud Stadium; Attendance: 1,437; Referee: Roni Canales (USA)

July 14, 2006 USL-1	Charleston Battery	3–2	Portland Timbers	Charleston, South Carolina
17:00 (PDT)	Glinton 26'; Hollingsworth 55' (pen.); Armstrong 78'	Report	21', 46' Kreamalmeyer	Stadium: Blackbaud Stadium; Attendance: 3,371; Referee: Shane Moody (USA)

July 15, 2006 USL-1	Atlanta Silverbacks	4–0	Portland Timbers	Atlanta
16:30 (PDT)	Ukah 23'; Millwood 45'; Jarun 60' de Lima 84'	Report		Stadium: RE/MAX Greater Atlanta Stadium; Attendance: 2,281; Referee: Yader Reyes (USA)

July 21, 2006 USL-1 / CC	Portland Timbers	1–2	Seattle Sounders	Portland, Oregon
20:00 (PDT)	Alcaraz-Cuellar 85'	Report	76' Besagno; 77' Weaver	Stadium: PGE Park; Attendance: 6,215; Referee: Yader Reyes (USA)

July 22, 2006 USL-1 / CC	Seattle Sounders	3–1	Portland Timbers	Seattle
19:00 (PDT)	Weaver 10'; Levesque 25'; Galindo 59'	Report	17' (pen.) Kreamalmeyer; (red card) 42' Randolph	Stadium: Qwest Field; Attendance: 2,993; Referee: Colin Tait (USA)

July 27, 2006 USL-1	Virginia Beach Mariners	3–1	Portland Timbers	Virginia Beach, Virginia
16:30 (PDT)	60' (o.g.); Simmonds 80'; Brillant 83'	Report	39' Kreamalmeyer	Stadium: Virginia Beach Sportsplex; Attendance: 2,183; Referee: Charles Mitchell (USA)

July 29, 2006 USL-1	Toronto Lynx	0–0	Portland Timbers	Toronto, Canada
16:30 (PDT)		Report		Stadium: Centennial Park Stadium; Attendance: 1,089; Referee: Arnar Bernhardsson (Canada)

=== August ===
August 4, 2006 USL-1	Portland Timbers	0–1	Minnesota Thunder	Portland, Oregon
19:00 (PDT)		Report	51' Schmidt	Stadium: PGE Park; Attendance: 5,568; Referee: Hidajet Tica (USA)

August 10, 2006 USL-1	Portland Timbers	1–0	Virginia Beach Mariners	Portland, Oregon
19:00 (PDT)	Kreamalmeyer 49'	Report		Stadium: PGE Park; Attendance: 6,167; Referee: Miguel Chicas (USA)

August 18, 2006 USL-1	Portland Timbers	3–0	Puerto Rico Islanders	Portland, Oregon
19:00 (PDT)	Alvarez 8', 57'; Queeley 47' (o.g.)	Report		Stadium: PGE Park; Attendance: 6,085; Referee: Fotis Bazakos (USA)

August 31, 2006 USL-1	Portland Timbers	0–1	Montreal Impact	Portland, Oregon
19:00 (PDT)		Report	88' Di Lorenzo	Stadium: PGE Park; Attendance: 7,034; Referee: Jeff Hosking (USA)

=== September ===
September 3, 2006 USL-1	Portland Timbers	0–1	Charleston Battery	Portland, Oregon
18:00 (PDT)		Report	4' Armstrong	Stadium: PGE Park; Attendance: 5,112; Referee: Edvin Jurisevic (USA)

September 7, 2006 USL-1	Portland Timbers	0–2	Atlanta Silverbacks	Portland, Oregon
19:00 (PDT)		Report	32', 70' Millwood	Stadium: PGE Park; Attendance: 6,163; Referee: Colin Arblaster (USA)

== Competitions ==
=== USL First Division ===
==== Standings ====
Commissioner's Cup, bye to semifinal round of playoffs
Bye to semifinal round of playoffs
First round of playoffs

Pos	Club	Pts	Pld	W	L	T	GF	GA	GD	H2H Pts
1	Montreal Impact	51	28	14	5	9	31	15	+16	
2	Rochester Raging Rhinos	50	28	13	4	11	34	21	+13	
3	Charleston Battery	46	28	13	8	7	33	25	+8	CHA: 4 pts VAN: 1 pt
4	Vancouver Whitecaps	46	28	12	6	10	40	28	+12	CHA: 4 pts VAN: 1 pt
5	Miami FC	39	28	11	11	6	47	44	+3	
6	Puerto Rico Islanders	38	28	10	10	8	38	36	+2	
7	Seattle Sounders	37	28	11	13	4	42	48	−6	
8	Atlanta Silverbacks	35	28	10	13	5	36	42	−6	
9	Virginia Beach Mariners	32	28	8	12	8	26	37	−11	VAB: 7 pts TOR: 4 pts
10	Toronto Lynx	32	28	8	12	8	30	36	−6	VAB: 7 pts TOR: 4 pts
11	Portland Timbers	27	28	7	15	6	25	39	−14	POR: 9 pts MIN: 3 pts
12	Minnesota Thunder	27	28	7	15	6	34	45	−11	POR: 9 pts MIN: 3 pts

==== Results summary ====
Overall								Home						Away					
Pld	Pts	W	L	T	GF	GA	GD	W	L	T	GF	GA	GD	W	L	T	GF	GA	GD
28	27	7	15	6	25	39	−14	5	7	2	13	13	0	2	8	4	12	26	−14

Pld = Matches played; Pts = Points; W = Matches won; T = Matches tied; L = Matches lost; GF = Goals for; GA = Goals against; GD = Goal difference

==== Results by round ====
Round	1	2	3	4	5	6	7	8	9	10	11	12	13	14	15	16	17	18	19	20	21	22	23	24	25	26	27	28
Stadium	A	H	H	A	A	H	H	A	A	H	H	A	A	A	A	H	A	A	H	A	A	A	H	H	H	H	H	H
Result	L	T	W	L	L	L	W	W	T	W	T	W	T	T	L	L	L	L	L	L	L	T	L	W	W	L	L	L

A = Away; H = Home; W = Win; L = Loss; T = Tie

=== U.S. Open Cup ===
==== Cup bracket ====
Third round
PDL	Carolina Dynamo (aet)	3
USL-1	Seattle Sounders	2
USL-1	Charleston Battery	3
USL-1	Portland Timbers	1

Fourth round
MLS	Houston Dynamo	4
PDL	Carolina Dynamo	2
USL-1	Charleston Battery	3 (3)
MLS	FC Dallas (aet) (p)	3 (5)

Quarterfinals
MLS	Houston Dynamo	3
MLS	FC Dallas	0

==== Third round ====
July 12, 2006
16:30 (PDT)

Charleston Battery	3–1	Portland Timbers
Hollingsworth 36', 87' (pen.); Glinton 78'	Report	5' Kreamalmeyer

Blackbaud Stadium
Attendance: 1,437
Referee: Roni Canales

=== Cascadia Cup ===
2006
Team	Pts	Pld	W	L	D	GF	GA	GD
Seattle Sounders	14	8	4	2	2	13	10	+3
Vancouver Whitecaps	12	8	3	2	3	10	8	+2
Portland Timbers	6	8	1	4	3	6	11	-5

== Club ==
=== Coaching staff ===
Position	Staff
Head coach	(United States) Chris Agnello
Assistant coach	(New Zealand) Gavin Wilkinson
Assistant coach	(United States) Cony Konstin
Goalkeeper coach	(United States) John Galas

=== Management ===
Majority Owner	Pacific Coast League (to June 16) (Iran) Abe Alizadeh^{[A]} (from June 16)
President	(United States) John Cunningham (to December 14) (United States) Jack Cain (interim; from December 14)
General Manager	(United States) Chris Agnello (to September 26) (New Zealand) Gavin Wilkinson (from September 26)
Ground (capacity and dimensions)	PGE Park ( / )

== Squad ==
=== Kits ===
Home	Away

=== Final roster ===
Note: Flags indicate national team as defined under FIFA eligibility rules; some limited exceptions apply. Players may hold more than one non-FIFA nationality.

No.	Pos.	Nation	Player
0	GK	USA	Martin Hutton (on loan from Houston Dynamo)
1	GK	USA	Bayard Elfvin
2	DF	USA	Jacobi Goodfellow
4	DF	USA	Lee Morrison
5	DF	USA	Salim Bullen
6	MF	USA	Tom Poltl
7	MF	MEX	Hugo Alcaraz-Cuellar
9	MF	USA	Oral Bullen
10	MF	USA	Luke Kreamalmeyer
11	FW	USA	Alan Gordon (on loan from Los Angeles Galaxy)
12	MF	USA	Sergio Iñiguez
13	MF	COL	Alejandro Gutierrez
14	DF	USA	Garrett Marcum

No.	Pos.	Nation	Player
15	FW	MEX	Byron Alvarez
16	MF	USA	Mike Randolph
17	DF	USA	Scot Thompson (captain)
19	MF	USA	Troy Ready
21	MF	ZIM	Mubarike Chisoni
22	FW	USA	Jaime Ambriz
26	DF	USA	Michael Nsien
28	MF	USA	Mike Chabala (on loan from Houston Dynamo)
30	FW	USA	Yuri Morales
31	GK	USA	Josh Saunders (on loan from Los Angeles Galaxy)
33	MF	USA	Ronnie Silva
40	DF	NZL	Gavin Wilkinson

=== Recognition ===
USL-1 All-League First Team

Pos	Player	GP
MF	(United States) Luke Kreamalmeyer	28

USL-1 All-Star Team

Pos	Player	Notes
DF	(United States) Scot Thompson	Injured; did not dress in All-Star Game vs. (England) Sheffield Wednesday

USL-1 Player of the Week

Week	Player	Opponent(s)	Ref
7	(Mexico) Hugo Alcaraz-Cuellar	Seattle Sounders (x2)	
18	(Mexico) Byron Alvarez	Puerto Rico Islanders	

USL-1 Team of the Week

Week	Player	Opponent(s)	Ref
3	(United States) Chad Bartlomé	Vancouver Whitecaps, Minnesota Thunder	
3	(United States) Lee Morrison	Vancouver Whitecaps, Minnesota Thunder	
3	(United States) Troy Ready	Vancouver Whitecaps, Minnesota Thunder	
5	(United States) Oral Bullen	Rochester Raging Rhinos, Toronto Lynx	
6	(Mexico) Hugo Alcaraz-Cuellar	Minnesota Thunder	
7	(Mexico) Hugo Alcaraz-Cuellar	Seattle Sounders (x2)	
7	(United States) Jacobi Goodfellow	Seattle Sounders (x2)	
8	(United States) Josh Saunders	Vancouver Whitecaps	
9	(United States) Bayard Elfvin	Minnesota Thunder, Rochester Raging Rhinos, Montreal Impact	
9	(United States) Luke Kreamalmeyer	Minnesota Thunder, Rochester Raging Rhinos, Montreal Impact	
13	(United States) Luke Kreamalmeyer	Charleston Battery, Atlanta Silverbacks	
14	(Mexico) Hugo Alcaraz-Cuellar	Seattle Sounders (x2)	
17	(United States) Tom Poltl	Virginia Beach Mariners	
18	(Mexico) Byron Alvarez	Puerto Rico Islanders	
18	(United States) Bayard Elfvin	Puerto Rico Islanders	

=== Statistics ===
==== Appearances and goals ====
All players contracted to the club during the season included.

No.	Pos	Nat	Player	Total		USL-1		U.S. Open Cup	
No.	Pos	Nat	Player	Apps	Goals	Apps	Goals	Apps	Goals
0	GK	(United States) USA	Martin Hutton	2	0	2+0	0	0+0	0
(0)	GK	(United States) USA	Devin Zimmerman (released)	0	0	0+0	0	0+0	0
1	GK	(United States) USA	Bayard Elfvin	6	0	6+0	0	0+0	0
2	DF	(United States) USA	Jacobi Goodfellow	23	0	23+0	0	0+0	0
4	DF	(United States) USA	Lee Morrison	29	0	24+4	0	1+0	0
5	DF	(United States) USA	Salim Bullen	12	0	7+4	0	1+0	0
6	MF	(United States) USA	Tom Poltl	23	0	13+9	0	0+1	0
7	MF	(Mexico) MEX	Hugo Alcaraz-Cuellar	26	3	24+1	3	1+0	0
(8)	MF	(El Salvador) SLV	Edwin Miranda (released)	4	0	3+1	0	0+0	0
9	MF	(United States) USA	Oral Bullen	20	2	7+12	2	0+1	0
10	MF	(United States) USA	Luke Kreamalmeyer	29	9	26+2	8	1+0	1
11	FW	(United States) USA	Alan Gordon	1	0	1+0	0	0+0	0
(11)	FW	(United States) USA	Drew McAthy (released)	15	0	9+5	0	1+0	0
12	MF	(United States) USA	Sergio Iñiguez	9	0	2+7	0	0+0	0
13	MF	(Colombia) COL	Alejandro Gutierrez	15	2	10+4	2	0+1	0
14	DF	(United States) USA	Garrett Marcum	11	0	6+5	0	0+0	0
15	FW	(Mexico) MEX	Byron Alvarez	25	4	21+3	4	1+0	0
16	MF	(United States) USA	Mike Randolph	26	0	25+0	0	1+0	0
17	DF	(United States) USA	Scot Thompson	23	1	21+1	1	1+0	0
19	MF	(United States) USA	Troy Ready	11	1	1+10	1	0+0	0
21	MF	(Zimbabwe) ZIM	Mubarike Chisoni	18	2	16+1	2	1+0	0
22	FW	(United States) USA	Jaime Ambriz	0	0	0+0	0	0+0	0
(23)	FW	(United States) USA	Chad Bartlomé (undisclosed release or transfer)	5	1	4+1	1	0+0	0
26	DF	(United States) USA	Michael Nsien	18	0	18+0	0	0+0	0
28	MF	(United States) USA	Mike Chabala	8	0	8+0	0	0+0	0
30	FW	(United States) USA	Yuri Morales	7	0	3+4	0	0+0	0
31	GK	(United States) USA	Josh Saunders	23	0	20+2	0	1+0	0
33	MF	(United States) USA	Ronnie Silva	3	0	2+1	0	0+0	0
(33)	DF	(United States) USA	Josh Brown (released)	8	0	4+3	0	1+0	0
40	DF	(New Zealand) NZL	Gavin Wilkinson	8	0	2+6	0	0+0	0

==== Top scorers ====
Players with 1 goal or more included only.

Rk.	Nat.	Position	Player	Total	USL-1	U.S. Open Cup
1	(United States)	MF	Luke Kreamalmeyer	9	8	1
2	(Mexico)	FW	Byron Alvarez	4	4	0
3	(Mexico)	MF	Hugo Alcaraz-Cuellar	3	3	0
4	(United States)	MF	Oral Bullen	2	2	0
4	(Zimbabwe)	MF	Mubarike Chisoni	2	2	0
4	(Colombia)	MF	Alejandro Gutierrez	2	2	0
7	(United States)	FW	Chad Bartlomé	1	1	0
7	(United States)	MF	Troy Ready	1	1	0
7	(United States)	DF	Scot Thompson	1	1	0
			OWN GOALS	1	1	0
			TOTALS	26	25	1

==== Disciplinary record ====
Players with 1 card or more included only.

No.	Nat.	Position	Player	Total		USL-1		U.S. Open Cup	
No.	Nat.	Position	Player	Booked	Sent off (straight red)	Booked	Sent off (straight red)	Booked	Sent off (straight red)
1	(United States)	GK	Bayard Elfvin	1	0	0	0	1	0
2	(United States)	DF	Jacobi Goodfellow	7	0	7	0	0	0
4	(United States)	DF	Lee Morrison	4	0	3	0	1	0
5	(United States)	DF	Salim Bullen	1	0	1	0	0	0
6	(United States)	MF	Tom Poltl	5	0	4	0	1	0
7	(Mexico)	MF	Hugo Alcaraz-Cuellar	5	0	5	0	0	0
(8)	(El Salvador)	MF	Edwin Miranda	1	0	1	0	0	0
9	(United States)	MF	Oral Bullen	1	0	1	0	0	0
10	(United States)	MF	Luke Kreamalmeyer	1	0	1	0	0	0
13	(Colombia)	MF	Alejandro Gutierrez	4	0	4	0	0	0
14	(United States)	DF	Garrett Marcum	1	0	1	0	0	0
15	(Mexico)	FW	Byron Alvarez	7	0	7	0	0	0
16	(United States)	MF	Mike Randolph	4	1	3	1	1	0
17	(United States)	DF	Scot Thompson	4	0	4	0	0	0
19	(United States)	MF	Troy Ready	1	0	1	0	0	0
21	(Zimbabwe)	MF	Mubarike Chisoni	5	0	4	0	1	0
26	(United States)	DF	Michael Nsien	6	0	6	0	0	0
31	(United States)	GK	Josh Saunders	1	0	0	0	1	0
(33)	(United States)	DF	Josh Brown	2	0	2	0	0	0
40	(New Zealand)	DF	Gavin Wilkinson	2	0	2	0	0	0
			TOTALS	63	1	58	1	5	0

==== Goalkeeper stats ====
All goalkeepers included.

No.	Nat.	Player	Total				USL-1				U.S. Open Cup			
No.	Nat.	Player	MIN	GA	GAA	SV	MIN	GA	GAA	SV	MIN	GA	GAA	SV
0	(United States)	Martin Hutton	180	4	2.00	8	180	4	2.00	8	0	0	—	0
(0)	(United States)	Devin Zimmerman	0	0	—	0	0	0	—	0	0	0	—	0
1	(United States)	Bayard Elfvin	502	5	0.90	25	502	5	0.90	25	0	0	—	0
31	(United States)	Josh Saunders	1928	33	1.54	72	1838	30	1.47	66	90	3	3.00	6
		TOTALS	2610	42	1.45	105	2520	39	1.39	99	90	3	3.00	6

=== Player movement ===
==== Transfers in ====
Date	Player	Position	Previous club	Fee/notes	Ref
March 3, 2006	(United States) Oral Bullen (R)	MF	(United States) UMass Minutemen	Free	
March 3, 2006	(United States) Salim Bullen (R)	DF	(United States) Bradley Braves	Free	
March 3, 2006	(United States) Jacobi Goodfellow	DF	(United States) Los Angeles Galaxy Reserves	Free	
March 3, 2006	(United States) Drew McAthy	FW	Puerto Rico Islanders	Free	
March 13, 2006	(United States) Michael Nsien	DF	(United States) Los Angeles Galaxy Reserves	Free	
March 22, 2006	(United States) Luke Kreamalmeyer	MF	(United States) Real Salt Lake	Free	
March 30, 2006	(United States) Josh Brown (R)	DF	(United States) New Mexico Lobos	Free	
March 30, 2006	(United States) Mike Randolph (R)	MF	(United States) Yavapai Roughriders	Free	
March 30, 2006	(United States) Troy Ready	MF	(United States) Cascade Surge	Free	
March 30, 2006	(United States) Devin Zimmerman	GK	(United States) Olympique Montreux	Free	
April 3, 2006	(Zimbabwe) Mubarike Chisoni	FW	(United States) Los Angeles Galaxy	Free	
April 12, 2006	(Colombia) Alejandro Gutierrez	MF	(United States) Utah Blitzz	Free	
April 18, 2006	(United States) Sergio Iñiguez	MF	(United States) Atlanta Silverbacks	Free	
April / May 2006	(United States) Bayard Elfvin	GK	(United States) St. Louis Steamers	Free	
May 1, 2006	(United States) Chad Bartlomé	FW	(United States) California Cougars	Free	
June 29, 2006	(United States) Jaime Ambriz	FW	(Switzerland) Concordia Basel	Free	
July 27, 2006	(United States) Yuri Morales	FW	(Denmark) Ølstykke	Free	
August 3, 2006	(United States) Ronnie Silva	MF	(United States) Salinas Valley Samba	Free	

==== Loans in ====
Date	Player	Position	Previous club	Fee/notes	Ref
March 1, 2006	(United States) Josh Saunders	GK	(United States) Los Angeles Galaxy	Season-long loan	
June 29, 2006	(United States) Martin Hutton	GK	(United States) Houston Dynamo	Season-long loan	
July 27, 2006	(United States) Mike Chabala	MF	(United States) Houston Dynamo	Season-long loan	
August 3, 2006	(United States) Alan Gordon	FW	(United States) Los Angeles Galaxy	Season-long loan	

==== Transfers out ====
Date	Player	Position	Destination club	Fee/notes	Ref
End of 2005 season	(Syria) Fadi Afash	FW	N/A	Contract expired and not re-signed	
End of 2005 season	(United States) Dan Antoniuk	FW	N/A	Contract expired and not re-signed	
End of 2005 season	(United States) Scott Benedetti	MF	N/A	Contract expired and not re-signed	
End of 2005 season	(United States) Paul Conway	FW	N/A	Contract expired and not re-signed	
End of 2005 season	(United States) Shaun Higgins	MF	N/A	Contract expired and not re-signed	
End of 2005 season	(New Zealand) Aaran Lines	MF	N/A	Contract expired and not re-signed	
End of 2005 season	(United States) Jarrod Weis	MF	N/A	Contract expired and not re-signed	
End of 2005 season	(United States) Brian Winters	MF	N/A	Contract expired and not re-signed	
March 30, 2006	(United States) Sam Reynolds	GK	Unattached	Released	
May / June 2006	(United States) Chad Bartlomé	FW	Undisclosed	Undisclosed	
June 10, 2006	(El Salvador) Edwin Miranda	MF	Unattached	Released	
June 10, 2006	(United States) Devin Zimmerman	GK	Unattached	Released	
August 3, 2006	(United States) Josh Brown	DF	Unattached	Released	
August 3, 2006	(United States) Drew McAthy	FW	Unattached	Released	

==== Unsigned draft picks ====
Date	Player	Position	Previous club	Notes	Ref
January 24, 2006	(Trinidad and Tobago) Anthony Noreiga	DF	(United States) George Mason Patriots	USL-1 College Player Draft, 1st round	
January 24, 2006	(United States) Kenney Bertz	DF	(United States) Maryland Terrapins (United States) Columbus Shooting Stars	USL-1 College Player Draft, 2nd round	

== Notes ==
A. It was announced on March 30, 2005 that Portland Baseball Investment Group, headed by Abe Alizadeh, had agreed to buy the Timbers and the Portland Beavers baseball club from the Pacific Coast League. The Timbers referred to Alizadeh as the Majority Owner in press releases throughout the 2005 and 2006 seasons. However, the sale was not officially completed until June 16, 2006.
