= 2005 Portland Timbers season =

Portland Timbers
2005 season
- President: John Cunningham
- Head coach: Bobby Howe
- Stadium: PGE Park; Portland, Oregon
- USL-1: League: 5th Playoffs: First round
- U.S. Open Cup: Fourth round
- Cascadia Cup: 2nd
- Top goalscorer: League: Dan Antoniuk (13 goals); All: Dan Antoniuk (14 goals)
- Highest home attendance: 8,242 vs. SEA (Aug 20)
- Lowest home attendance: 3,944 vs. VAN (Jul 2)
- Average home league attendance: League: 5,553; All: 5,626 (not including July 12 vs. Seattle)
Home colors	Away colors

The 2005 Portland Timbers season was the 5th season for the Portland Timbers—the 3rd incarnation of a club to bear the Timbers name—of the now-defunct USL First Division, the second-tier league of the United States and Canada at the time.

== Preseason ==
April 9, 2005	Portland Timbers	2–1	Seattle Sounders	Portland, Oregon United States
19:00 (PDT)	Thompson 23'; Reynolds (red card) 59'; Harrington 78'	Report	62' Jenkins	Stadium: PGE Park; Attendance: 3,262

April 13, 2005	Portland Timbers	0–1	Los Angeles Galaxy (MLS)	Portland, Oregon United States
19:00 (PDT)		Report	39' Gomez	Stadium: PGE Park; Attendance: 4,227

== Regular season ==
=== April ===
April 23, 2005 USL-1	Portland Timbers	3–0	Toronto Lynx	Portland, Oregon United States
19:00 (PDT)	Dekker 50' (o.g.); Miranda 59'; Alvarez 84'	Report		Stadium: PGE Park; Attendance: 5,275; Referee: Kari Seitz (United States)

April 29, 2005 USL-1	Portland Timbers	2–2	Minnesota Thunder	Portland, Oregon United States
19:00 (PDT)	Benedetti 14'; Thompson 15'	Report	11' (red card) 54' Tarley; 79' Menyongar	Stadium: PGE Park; Attendance: 4,262; Referee: Richard Herring (United States)

April 30, 2005 USL-1 / CC	Seattle Sounders	1–2	Portland Timbers	Seattle United States
19:00 (PDT)	Wélton 73'; Brown (red card) 90'	Report	51' Alvarez; 54' Poltl	Stadium: Qwest Field; Attendance: 6,351; Referee: Fotis Bazakos (United States)

=== May ===
May 7, 2005 USL-1	Minnesota Thunder	1–1	Portland Timbers	Minneapolis United States
17:05 (PDT)	Menyongar 9'	Report	78' Antoniuk	Stadium: Metrodome; Attendance: 2,934; Referee: Mishaun Ahmad (United States)

May 12, 2005 USL-1	Portland Timbers	1–0	Charleston Battery	Portland, Oregon United States
19:00 (PDT)	Afash 89'	Report		Stadium: PGE Park; Attendance: 4,645; Referee: Ian Anderson (United States)

May 28, 2005 USL-1	Portland Timbers	2–2	Virginia Beach Mariners	Portland, Oregon United States
19:00 (PDT)	Alvarez 6' (pen.); Lines 51'	Report	60' Castellanos; 84' (pen.) Caskey	Stadium: PGE Park; Attendance: 7,048; Referee: Doug Jotzke (United States)

=== June ===
June 3, 2005 USL-1	Rochester Raging Rhinos	3–1	Portland Timbers	Rochester, New York United States
16:35 (PDT)	Bolaños 20'; Wilson 23', 34'	Report	82' (pen.) Antoniuk	Stadium: Frontier Field; Attendance: 9,117; Referee: Charles Mitchell (United States)

June 4, 2005 USL-1	Toronto Lynx	0–1	Portland Timbers	Toronto Canada
16:30 (PDT)		Report	14' (pen.) Antoniuk	Stadium: Centennial Park Stadium; Attendance: 2,724; Referee: Pierre Cantave (Canada)

June 6, 2005 USL-1	Puerto Rico Islanders	2–0	Portland Timbers	Bayamón PUR
17:00 (PDT)	Salles 6', 74'	Report		Stadium: Juan Ramón Loubriel Stadium; Attendance: 5,580; Referee: Brian Poeschel (United States)

June 10, 2005 USL-1 / CC	Vancouver Whitecaps	3–2	Portland Timbers	Burnaby, British Columbia Canada
19:00 (PDT)	Valente 39' (pen.); Nash 40'; Klein 90+'	Report	78' Poltl; 90+' Miranda	Stadium: Swangard Stadium; Attendance: 5,337 (SO); Referee: Steve DePiero (Canada)

June 16, 2005 USL-1	Portland Timbers	2–1	Puerto Rico Islanders	Portland, Oregon United States
19:00 (PDT)	Antoniuk 48', 71'	Report	45' Woolfolk; (red card) 79' Rivera	Stadium: PGE Park; Attendance: 5,992; Referee: Colin Arblaster (United States)

June 18, 2005 USL-1	Portland Timbers	0–5	Rochester Raging Rhinos	Portland, Oregon United States
19:00 (PDT)		Report	15' Carbajal; 37' Ball; 43' Aguilera; 47' Wilson; 54' Rivas	Stadium: PGE Park; Attendance: 5,313; Referee: Mark Kadlecik (United States)

June 30, 2005 USL-1	Portland Timbers	0–1	Montreal Impact	Portland, Oregon United States
19:00 (PDT)		Report	58' Grande	Stadium: PGE Park; Attendance: 5,435; Referee: Said Ravanfar (United States)

=== July ===
July 2, 2005 USL-1 / CC	Portland Timbers	1–1	Vancouver Whitecaps	Portland, Oregon United States
19:00 (PDT)	Alvarez 7'; Poltl (red card) 22'	Report	37' Jordan	Stadium: PGE Park; Attendance: 3,944; Referee: Kari Seitz (United States)

July 8, 2005 USL-1 / CC	Seattle Sounders	4–2	Portland Timbers	Tukwila, Washington United States
20:00 (PDT)	Sturm 19'; Graham 45', 89'; Levesque 56'	Report	60' (pen.) Alvarez; 68' Higgins	Stadium: Starfire Sports Complex; Attendance: 3,204; Referee: Baldomero Toledo (United States)

July 9, 2005 USL-1 / CC	Vancouver Whitecaps	4–0	Portland Timbers	Kelowna, British Columbia Canada
19:00 (PDT)	Clarke 34'; Klein 36', 82'; Gjertsen 39'	Report		Stadium: Apple Bowl; Attendance: 2,440; Referee: Dave Gantar (Canada)

July 12, 2005 USOC 3rd Rd	Portland Timbers	2–0	Seattle Sounders	Portland, Oregon United States
19:00 (PDT)	Alcaraz-Cuellar 15'; Antoniuk 59' (pen.); Alvarez (red card) 78'	Report		Stadium: PGE Park; Referee: Yader Reyes (United States)

July 14, 2005 USL-1 / CC	Portland Timbers	1–1	Vancouver Whitecaps	Portland, Oregon United States
19:00 (PDT)	Thompson 31'	Report	89' Klein	Stadium: PGE Park; Attendance: 5,523; Referee: Ricardo Valenzuela (United States)

July 23, 2005 Friendly	Portland Timbers	0–0	Sunderland	Portland, Oregon United States
19:00 (PDT)		Report		Stadium: PGE Park; Attendance: 15,376

=== August ===
August 3, 2005 USOC 4th Rd	Portland Timbers	0–2	San Jose Earthquakes (MLS)	Portland, Oregon United States
19:00 (PDT)		Report	27' Barrett; 63' Mullan	Stadium: PGE Park; Attendance: 6,607; Referee: Alex Prus (United States)

August 5, 2005 USL-1	Portland Timbers	3–3	Minnesota Thunder	Portland, Oregon United States
20:00 (PDT)	Alvarez 21'; Thompson 32'; Alcaraz-Cuellar 63'	Report	33' Tenoff; 44' Tarley; 53' Alberts	Stadium: PGE Park; Attendance: 4,613; Referee: Colin Arblaster (United States)

August 7, 2005 USL-1 / CC	Portland Timbers	1–0	Seattle Sounders	Portland, Oregon United States
17:00 (PDT)	Conway 77'	Report		Stadium: PGE Park; Attendance: 4,227; Referee: Richard Heron (United States)

August 10, 2005 USL-1	Montreal Impact	0–1	Portland Timbers	Montréal, Québec Canada
16:30 (PDT)		Report	73' Antoniuk	Stadium: Complexe sportif Claude-Robillard; Attendance: 9,278; Referee: Daniel Belleau (Canada)

August 13, 2005 USL-1	Minnesota Thunder	1–1	Portland Timbers	Saint Paul, Minnesota United States
17:05 (PDT)	Friedland 87'	Report	52' Alvarez	Stadium: James Griffin Stadium; Attendance: 3,282; Referee: Troy Cohrs (United States)

August 20, 2005 USL-1 / CC	Portland Timbers	1–1	Seattle Sounders	Portland, Oregon United States
19:00 (PDT)	Higgins 86'	Report	22' Jenkins	Stadium: PGE Park; Attendance: 8,242; Referee: Ramón Hernández (United States)

August 27, 2005 USL-1	Charleston Battery	1–0	Portland Timbers	Charleston, South Carolina United States
16:30 (PDT)	Lubezky 88'	Report		Stadium: Blackbaud Stadium; Attendance: 4,097; Referee: Saeed Mohamed (United States)

August 28, 2005 USL-1	Atlanta Silverbacks	1–2	Portland Timbers	Clarkston, Georgia United States
14:30 (PDT)	Hayes 74'; McManus (red card) 80'	Report	29', 52' (pen.) (red card) 80' Antoniuk	Stadium: James Hallford Stadium; Attendance: 1,464

=== September ===
September 2, 2005 USL-1	Virginia Beach Mariners	2–0	Portland Timbers	Virginia Beach, Virginia United States
16:30 (PDT)	Fenger-Larsen 33'; Shak 51'	Report	(red card) 72' Conway	Stadium: Virginia Beach Sportsplex; Attendance: 1,789; Referee: Niko Bratsis (United States)

September 3, 2005 USL-1	Richmond Kickers	1–1	Portland Timbers	Richmond, Virginia United States
16:00 (PDT)	Hare 88'	Report	59' Antoniuk; (red card) 61' Wilkinson	Stadium: University of Richmond Stadium; Attendance: 2,289; Referee: Bill Dittmar (United States)

September 8, 2005 USL-1	Portland Timbers	6–1	Atlanta Silverbacks	Portland, Oregon United States
19:00 (PDT)	Antoniuk 43', 72', 90'; Alvarez 51'; Miranda 77', 78'	Report	57' Pineda; (red card) 83' Stone	Stadium: PGE Park; Attendance: 5,361; Referee: Ian Anderson (United States)

September 10, 2005 USL-1	Portland Timbers	3–0	Richmond Kickers	Portland, Oregon United States
19:00 (PDT)	Thompson 35'; Antoniuk 84'; Alvarez 88'	Report		Stadium: PGE Park; Attendance: 7,858; Referee: Yader Reyes (United States)

== Postseason ==
September 16, 2005 1st Rd Leg 1	Portland Timbers	0–1	Seattle Sounders	Portland, Oregon United States
19:00 (PDT)		Report	2' Levesque	Stadium: PGE Park; Attendance: 5,667; Referee: Yader Reyes (United States)

September 18, 2005 1st Rd Leg 2	Seattle Sounders	2–0 (3–0 agg.)	Portland Timbers	Tukwila, Washington United States
19:00 (PDT)	Levesque 5', 54'	Report	(red card) 27' Lines	Stadium: Starfire Sports Complex; Attendance: 2,543; Referee: Fotis Bazakos (United States)

== Competitions ==
=== USL First Division ===
==== Standings ====
Commissioner's Cup, bye to semifinal round of playoffs
Bye to semifinal round of playoffs
First round of playoffs

Pos	Club	Pts	Pld	W	L	T	GF	GA	GD	H2H Pts
1	Montreal Impact	61	28	18	3	7	37	15	+22	
2	Rochester Raging Rhinos	51	28	15	7	6	45	27	+18	
3	Vancouver Whitecaps	45	28	12	7	9	37	21	+16	
4	Seattle Sounders	44	28	11	6	11	33	25	+8	
5	Portland Timbers	39	28	10	9	9	40	42	−2	POR: 4 pts RIC: 1 pt
6	Richmond Kickers	39	28	10	9	9	28	30	−2	POR: 4 pts RIC: 1 pt
7	Puerto Rico Islanders	38	28	10	10	8	46	43	+3	
8	Atlanta Silverbacks	33	28	10	15	3	40	52	−12	
9	Charleston Battery	32	28	9	14	5	27	36	−9	
10	Minnesota Thunder	31	28	7	11	10	37	42	−5	
11	Virginia Beach Mariners	28	28	7	14	7	26	39	−13	
12	Toronto Lynx	17	28	3	17	8	26	50	−24	

==== Results summary ====
Overall								Home						Away					
Pld	Pts	W	L	T	GF	GA	GD	W	L	T	GF	GA	GD	W	L	T	GF	GA	GD
28	39	10	9	9	40	42	−2	6	2	6	26	18	+8	4	7	3	14	24	−10

Pld = Matches played; Pts = Points; W = Matches won; T = Matches tied; L = Matches lost; GF = Goals for; GA = Goals against; GD = Goal difference

==== Results by round ====
Round	1	2	3	4	5	6	7	8	9	10	11	12	13	14	15	16	17	18	19	20	21	22	23	24	25	26	27	28
Stadium	H	H	A	A	H	H	A	A	A	A	H	H	H	H	A	A	H	H	H	A	A	H	A	A	A	A	H	H
Result	W	T	W	T	W	T	L	W	L	L	W	L	L	T	L	L	T	T	W	W	T	T	L	W	L	T	W	W

A = Away; H = Home; W = Win; L = Loss; T = Tie

=== USL-1 Playoffs ===
==== Playoff bracket ====
Each round except the final was a two-game aggregate goal series decided by extra time and a penalty shoot-out immediately following the second game of the series, if necessary. The away goals rule was not used as a tie-breaker. Tournament was re-seeded after the first round.

Quarterfinals
4	Seattle Sounders	1	2	3
5	Portland Timbers	0	0	0
3	Vancouver Whitecaps	0	0	0 (4)
6	Richmond Kickers (p)	0	0	0 (5)

Semifinals
1	Montreal Impact	2	1	3
4	Seattle Sounders	2	2	4
2	Rochester Raging Rhinos	1	1	2
6	Richmond Kickers	1	3	4

Finals
4	Seattle Sounders (p)	1 (4)
6	Richmond Kickers	1 (3)

==== Quarterfinals ====
September 16, 2005
7::00 PM ET
Leg 1

Richmond Kickers	0–0	Vancouver Whitecaps
Cephas (yellow card) 13'; Worthen (yellow card) 69'	Report	Clarke (yellow card) 58'; Dasovic (yellow card) 64'

University of Richmond Stadium
Richmond, Virginia
Attendance: 2,476
Referee: Joe Cardecio
September 18, 2005
10:00 PM ET
Leg 2

Vancouver Whitecaps	0–0	Richmond Kickers
Nash (yellow card) 42'; Morris (yellow card) 49'; Lyall (yellow card) 112'	Report	Brown (yellow card) 15'; Williams (yellow card) 99'
Penalties
Corazzin (penalty scored); Franks (penalty missed); Nash (penalty scored); Kindel (penalty scored); Dasovic (penalty scored)	4–5	(penalty scored) Ssejjemba; (penalty scored) Delicate; (penalty scored) Gorres; (penalty scored) Worthen; (penalty scored) Jeffrey

Swangard Stadium
Burnaby, British Columbia
Attendance: 5,332
Referee: Steve De Piero

Richmond Kickers won 5–4 on Penalty kicks after tying both games 0–0.

September 16, 2005
10:00 PM EDT
First Leg

Portland Timbers	0–1	Seattle Sounders
Miranda (yellow card) 30'	Report	Levesque 2'; Scott (yellow card) 32'; Sleeth (yellow card) 45'; O'Brien (yellow card) 72'; Gregor (yellow card) 90'

PGE Park
Portland, Oregon
Attendance: 5,667
Referee: Yader Reyes
September 18, 2005
10:00 PM EDT

Seattle Sounders	2–0	Portland Timbers
Levesque 5', 54'; O'Brien (yellow card) 29'	Report	Marcum (yellow card) 17'; Alvarez (yellow card) 22'; Lines (yellow card) 25' (yellow-red card) 27'

Starfire Sports Complex
Tukwila, Washington
Attendance: 2,543
Referee: Fotis Bazakos

Seattle Sounders won 3–0 on Aggregate.

==== Semifinals ====
September 23, 2005
7:00 PM EDT
First Leg

Richmond Kickers	3–1	Rochester Raging Rhinos
Delicate 12', 55'; Brown (yellow card) 41'; Worthen 65'	Report	15' (o.g.); Sedgewick (yellow card) 56'; Miller (yellow card) 68'; Howes (yellow card) 70'

University of Richmond Stadium
Richmond, Virginia
Attendance: 2,672
Referee: Tony Crush
September 25, 2005
7:00 PM EDT
Second Leg

Rochester Raging Rhinos	1–1	Richmond Kickers
Carrieri (yellow card) 55'; Bobo (yellow card) 88'; Carabajal (red card) 90'; Miller 90+5' (pen.)	Report	Delicate 51'; Vallow (yellow card) 55'; Schweitzer (yellow card) 81'; Cephas (red card) 90'

Frontier Field
Rochester, New York
Attendance: 6,195
Referee: Agusto St Silva

Richmond Kickers won 4–2 on Aggregate.

September 23, 2005
10:00 PM EDT
First Leg

Seattle Sounders	2–2	Montreal Impact
Sturm 10'; O'Brien 22' (yellow card) 34'; Sleeth (yellow card) 44'	Report	Gervais (yellow card) 21'; Vincello (yellow card) 22'; Burpo (yellow card) 62'; Gbeke 86', 88'

Starfire Sports Complex
Tukwila, Washington
Attendance: 2,698
Referee: Ramon Hernandez
September 25, 2005
4:00 PM EDT
Second Leg

Montreal Impact	1–2	Seattle Sounders
Pizzolitto (yellow card) 28'; Gervais (yellow card) 67'	Report	Edwards (yellow card) 32'; Levesque (yellow card) 52' (goal) 90'; Whitfield 59'; Gregor (yellow card) 78'; Sakuda (yellow card) 90'

Claude Robillard Sports Complex
Montreal, Quebec
Attendance: 10,124
Referee: Silviu Petrescu

Seattle Sounders won 4–3 on Aggregate.

==== Final ====
October 1, 2005
11:00 PM EDT

Seattle Sounders	1–1 (a.e.t.)	Richmond Kickers
Scott (yellow card) 19'; Edwards (yellow card) 45'; Klaas (yellow card) 65'; Galindo 73'; Gregor (yellow card) 79'	Report	Carrieri (yellow card) 17'; Brown (yellow card) 19'; Gorres 24'; Burke (yellow card) 29'
Penalties
Gregor (penalty scored); O'Brien (penalty scored); Levesque (penalty missed); Somoza (penalty missed); Graham (penalty missed); Sakuda (penalty scored); Jenkins (penalty scored)	4–3	(penalty missed) Delicate; (penalty missed) Ssejjemba; (penalty scored) Gorres; (penalty scored) Williams; (penalty missed) Jeffrey; (penalty scored) Pauls; (penalty missed) Pascale

Qwest Field
Seattle, Washington
Attendance: 8,011
Referee: Ricardo Valenzuela

==== Awards and All-League Teams ====
First Team
F: Fabian Dawkins (Atlanta Silverbacks); Jason Jordan (Vancouver Whitecaps) (MVP & Leading Goalscorer); Mauricio Salles (Puerto Rico Islanders)
M: Hugo Alcaraz-Cuellar (Portland Timbers); Mauro Biello (Montreal Impact); Steve Klein (Vancouver Whitecaps); Kirk Wilson (Rochester Raging Rhinos)
D: Gabriel Gervais (Montreal Impact); Taylor Graham (Seattle Sounders) (Defender of the Year); Scot Thompson (Portland Timbers)
G: Greg Sutton (Montreal Impact) (Goalkeeper of the Year)
Coach: Nick De Santis (Montreal Impact) (Coach of the Year)

Second Team
F: Dan Antoniuk (Portland Timbers); Johnny Menyongar (Minnesota Thunder); Melvin Tarley (Minnesota Thunder)
M: Darren Caskey (Virginia Beach Mariners); Jeff Matteo (Minnesota Thunder); Rodrigo Rios (Atlanta Silverbacks); Petter Villegas (Puerto Rico Islanders))
D: Ben Hollingsworth (Charleston Battery); Peter Luzak (Richmond Kickers); Nevio Pizzolitto (Montreal Impact)
G: Preston Burpo (Seattle Sounders)

==== First round ====
September 16, 2005
19:00 (PDT)
Leg 1

Portland Timbers	0–1	Seattle Sounders
	Report	2' Levesque

PGE Park
Attendance: 5,667
Referee: Yader Reyes (United States)

September 18, 2005
19:00 (PDT)
Leg 2

Seattle Sounders	2–0	Portland Timbers
Levesque 5', 54'	Report	(red card) 27' Lines

Starfire Sports Complex
Attendance: 2,543
Referee: Fotis Bazakos (United States)

=== U.S. Open Cup ===
==== Cup bracket ====
Third round
USL-1	Portland Timbers	2
USL-1	Seattle Sounders	0
USL-2	Charlotte Eagles	2
MLS	Chivas USA (aet)	3

Fourth round
USL-1	Portland Timbers	0
MLS	San Jose Earthquakes	2
MLS	Chivas USA	2
MLS	Los Angeles Galaxy	5

Quarterfinals
MLS	San Jose Earthquakes	1
MLS	Los Angeles Galaxy	2

==== Third round ====
July 12, 2005
19:00 (PDT)

Portland Timbers	2–0	Seattle Sounders
Alcaraz-Cuellar 15'; Antoniuk 59' (pen.); Alvarez (red card) 78'	Report

PGE Park
Referee: Yader Reyes

==== Fourth round ====
August 3, 2005
19:00 (PDT)

Portland Timbers	0–2	San Jose Earthquakes (MLS)
	Report	27' Barrett; 63' Mullan

PGE Park
Attendance: 6,607
Referee: Alex Prus

=== Cascadia Cup ===
2005
Team	Pts	Pld	W	L	D	GF	GA	GD
Vancouver Whitecaps	12	8	2	0	6	10	5	+5
Portland Timbers	9	8	2	3	3	10	15	-5
Seattle Sounders	8	8	1	2	5	7	7	0

== Club ==
=== Coaching staff ===
Position	Staff
Head coach	(England) Bobby Howe
Assistant coach	(Republic of Ireland) Jimmy Conway
Assistant coach	(New Zealand) Gavin Wilkinson
Goalkeeper coach	(United States) Jim Brazeau
Athletic Trainer	(United States) Tony Guyette

=== Management ===
Owner	Pacific Coast League^{[A]}
President	(United States) Tom Lasley (interim; to February) (United States) John Cunningham (from February)
General Manager	(United States) Jim Taylor (to October 11); Vacant (from October 11 to December 20) (United States) Chris Agnello (from December 20)
Ground (capacity and dimensions)	PGE Park ( / )

== Squad ==
=== Kits ===
Home	Away

=== Final roster ===
Note: Flags indicate national team as defined under FIFA eligibility rules; some limited exceptions apply. Players may hold more than one non-FIFA nationality.

No.	Pos.	Nation	Player
1	GK	USA	Sam Reynolds
2	DF	USA	Kevin Goldthwaite (on loan from San Jose Earthquakes)
5	DF	NZL	Gavin Wilkinson
6	MF	USA	Tom Poltl
7	MF	MEX	Hugo Alcaraz-Cuellar
8	MF	SLV	Edwin Miranda
9	FW	USA	Dan Antoniuk
10	FW	SYR	Fadi Afash
11	MF	USA	Brian Winters
12	MF	USA	Jarrod Weis

No.	Pos.	Nation	Player
13	FW	USA	Paul Conway
14	MF	USA	Scott Benedetti
15	FW	MEX	Byron Alvarez
17	DF	USA	Scot Thompson
18	MF	USA	Shaun Higgins
20	MF	NZL	Aaran Lines
24	DF	USA	Lee Morrison
30	GK	USA	Josh Saunders (on loan from Los Angeles Galaxy)
32	DF	USA	Garrett Marcum

=== Recognition ===
USL-1 Assist Leader

Player	GP	A
(Mexico) Hugo Alcaraz-Cuellar	26	12

USL-1 All-League First Team

Pos	Player	GP
DF	(United States) Scot Thompson	26
MF	(Mexico) Hugo Alcaraz-Cuellar	26

USL-1 All-League Second Team

Pos	Player	GP
FW	(United States) Dan Antoniuk	24

USL-1 Player of the Week

Week	Player	Opponent(s)
2	(El Salvador) Edwin Miranda	Minnesota Thunder, Seattle Sounders
16	(Mexico) Hugo Alcaraz-Cuellar	Minnesota Thunder, Seattle Sounders
21	(United States) Dan Antoniuk	Atlanta Silverbacks, Richmond Kickers

USL-1 Team of the Week

Week	Player	Opponent(s)
1	(Mexico) Byron Alvarez	Toronto Lynx
2	(Mexico) Byron Alvarez	Minnesota Thunder, Seattle Sounders
2	(El Salvador) Edwin Miranda	Minnesota Thunder, Seattle Sounders
3	(Mexico) Hugo Alcaraz-Cuellar	Minnesota Thunder
3	(United States) Dan Antoniuk	Minnesota Thunder
4	(El Salvador) Edwin Miranda	Charleston Battery
8	(El Salvador) Edwin Miranda	Puerto Rico Islanders, Vancouver Whitecaps
9	(United States) Dan Antoniuk	Puerto Rico Islanders, Rochester Raging Rhinos
11	(United States) Scot Thompson	Montreal Impact, Vancouver Whitecaps
13	(United States) Scot Thompson	Vancouver Whitecaps
16	(Mexico) Hugo Alcaraz-Cuellar	Minnesota Thunder, Seattle Sounders
16	(United States) Scot Thompson	Minnesota Thunder, Seattle Sounders
17	(Mexico) Byron Alvarez	Montreal Impact, Minnesota Thunder
17	(United States) Dan Antoniuk	Montreal Impact, Minnesota Thunder
18	(United States) Shaun Higgins	Seattle Sounders
19	(Mexico) Hugo Alcaraz-Cuellar	Charleston Battery, Atlanta Silverbacks
20	(United States) Dan Antoniuk	Virginia Beach Mariners, Richmond Kickers
21	(United States) Dan Antoniuk	Atlanta Silverbacks, Richmond Kickers
21	(El Salvador) Edwin Miranda	Atlanta Silverbacks, Richmond Kickers
21	(United States) Scot Thompson	Atlanta Silverbacks, Richmond Kickers

=== Statistics ===
==== Appearances and goals ====
All players contracted to the club during the season included.

No.	Pos	Nat	Player	Total		USL-1		Playoffs		U.S. Open Cup	
No.	Pos	Nat	Player	Apps	Goals	Apps	Goals	Apps	Goals	Apps	Goals
1	GK	(United States) USA	Sam Reynolds	0	0	0+0	0	0+0	0	0+0	0
2	DF	(United States) USA	Kevin Goldthwaite	12	0	10+0	0	2+0	0	0+0	0
(4)	DF	(United States) USA	David Henning (released)	1	0	0+1	0	0+0	0	0+0	0
5	DF	(New Zealand) NZL	Gavin Wilkinson	20	0	17+3	0	0+0	0	0+0	0
6	MF	(United States) USA	Tom Poltl	26	2	18+6	2	0+0	0	2+0	0
7	MF	(Mexico) MEX	Hugo Alcaraz-Cuellar	30	2	24+2	1	2+0	0	2+0	1
8	MF	(El Salvador) SLV	Edwin Miranda	31	4	27+0	4	2+0	0	2+0	0
9	FW	(United States) USA	Dan Antoniuk	28	14	23+1	13	2+0	0	2+0	1
10	FW	(Syria) SYR	Fadi Afash	13	1	1+10	1	0+1	0	1+0	0
11	MF	(United States) USA	Brian Winters	30	0	24+2	0	2+0	0	2+0	0
12	MF	(United States) USA	Jarrod Weis	3	0	1+1	0	0+0	0	1+0	0
13	FW	(United States) USA	Paul Conway	13	1	8+5	1	0+0	0	0+0	0
14	MF	(United States) USA	Scott Benedetti	14	1	6+6	1	0+1	0	0+1	0
15	FW	(Mexico) MEX	Byron Alvarez	29	9	21+5	9	2+0	0	1+0	0
16	FW	(United States) USA	Ben DeSanno	1	0	1+0	0	0+0	0	0+0	0
17	DF	(United States) USA	Scot Thompson	30	4	26+0	4	2+0	0	2+0	0
18	MF	(United States) USA	Shaun Higgins	18	2	10+6	2	0+1	0	0+1	0
20	MF	(New Zealand) NZL	Aaran Lines	26	1	19+4	1	2+0	0	1+0	0
(22)	MF	(United States) USA	Memo Arzate (released)	2	0	0+2	0	0+0	0	0+0	0
(23)	DF	(United States) USA	Aaron Heinzen (released)	10	0	8+2	0	0+0	0	0+0	0
24	DF	(United States) USA	Lee Morrison	30	0	21+5	0	2+0	0	2+0	0
30	GK	(United States) USA	Josh Saunders	32	0	28+0	0	2+0	0	2+0	0
(31)	DF	(United States) USA	Shawn Saunders (released)	6	0	5+1	0	0+0	0	0+0	0
32	DF	(United States) USA	Garrett Marcum	16	0	11+1	0	2+0	0	2+0	0

==== Top scorers ====
Players with 1 goal or more included only.

Rk.	Nat.	Position	Player	Total	USL-1	Playoffs	U.S. Open Cup
1	(United States)	FW	Dan Antoniuk	14	13	0	1
2	(Mexico)	FW	Byron Alvarez	9	9	0	0
3	(El Salvador)	MF	Edwin Miranda	4	4	0	0
3	(United States)	DF	Scot Thompson	4	4	0	0
5	(United States)	MF	Shaun Higgins	2	2	0	0
5	(United States)	MF	Tom Poltl	2	2	0	0
5	(Mexico)	MF	Hugo Alcaraz-Cuellar	2	1	0	1
8	(Syria)	FW	Fadi Afash	1	1	0	0
8	(United States)	MF	Scott Benedetti	1	1	0	0
8	(United States)	FW	Paul Conway	1	1	0	0
8	(New Zealand)	MF	Aaran Lines	1	1	0	0
			OWN GOALS	1	1	0	0
			TOTALS	42	40	0	2

==== Disciplinary record ====
Players with 1 card or more included only.

No.	Nat.	Position	Player	Total		USL-1		Playoffs		U.S. Open Cup	
No.	Nat.	Position	Player	Booked	Sent off (straight red)	Booked	Sent off (straight red)	Booked	Sent off (straight red)	Booked	Sent off (straight red)
2	(United States)	DF	Kevin Goldthwaite	4	0	4	0	0	0	0	0
5	(New Zealand)	DF	Gavin Wilkinson	5	1	5	1	0	0	0	0
6	(United States)	MF	Tom Poltl	6	1	5	1	0	0	1	0
7	(Mexico)	MF	Hugo Alcaraz-Cuellar	5	0	5	0	0	0	0	0
8	(El Salvador)	MF	Edwin Miranda	7	0	5	0	1	0	1	0
9	(United States)	FW	Dan Antoniuk	1	1	1	1	0	0	0	0
11	(United States)	MF	Brian Winters	1	0	1	0	0	0	0	0
12	(United States)	MF	Jarrod Weis	1	0	1	0	0	0	0	0
13	(United States)	FW	Paul Conway	1	1	1	1	0	0	0	0
15	(Mexico)	FW	Byron Alvarez	8	1	5	0	1	0	2	1
17	(United States)	DF	Scot Thompson	2	0	2	0	0	0	0	0
18	(United States)	MF	Shaun Higgins	4	0	4	0	0	0	0	0
20	(New Zealand)	MF	Aaran Lines	6	1	4	0	2	1	0	0
24	(United States)	DF	Lee Morrison	2	0	2	0	0	0	0	0
30	(United States)	GK	Josh Saunders	1	0	1	0	0	0	0	0
(31)	(United States)	DF	Shawn Saunders	2	0	2	0	0	0	0	0
32	(United States)	DF	Garrett Marcum	2	0	1	0	1	0	0	0
			TOTALS	58	6	49	4	5	1	4	1

==== Goalkeeper stats ====
All goalkeepers included.

No.	Nat.	Player	Total				USL-1				Playoffs				U.S. Open Cup			
No.	Nat.	Player	MIN	GA	GAA	SV	MIN	GA	GAA	SV	MIN	GA	GAA	SV	MIN	GA	GAA	SV
1	(United States)	Sam Reynolds	0	0	—	0	0	0	—	0	0	0	—	0	0	0	—	0
30	(United States)	Josh Saunders	2880	47	1.47	113	2520	42	1.50	106	180	3	1.50	7	180	2	1.00	?
		TOTALS	2880	47	1.47	113	2520	42	1.50	106	180	3	1.50	7	180	2	1.00	?

=== Player movement ===
==== Transfers in ====
Date	Player	Position	Previous club	Fee/notes	Ref
January 28, 2005	(United States) Scot Thompson	DF	(United States) Los Angeles Galaxy	Free	
March 11, 2005	(New Zealand) Aaran Lines	MF	(Poland) Arka Gdynia	Free	
April 20, 2005	(United States) Shaun Higgins	MF	(United States) Orange County Blue Star	Free	
April 20, 2005	(United States) Tom Poltl	MF	(United States) Orange County Blue Star	Free	
April 21, 2005	(United States) Sam Reynolds (R)	GK	(United States) Cal State Fullerton Titans	Free	
May 20, 2005	(United States) Paul Conway	FW	(United States) Charleston Battery	Free	
June 15, 2005	(United States) Garrett Marcum	DF	(United States) Portland Timbers	Free	

==== Loans in ====
Date	Player	Position	Previous club	Fee/notes	Ref
April 21, 2005	(United States) Josh Saunders	GK	(United States) Los Angeles Galaxy	Season-long loan with option to recall	
May 6, 2005	(United States) Dan Antoniuk	FW	(United States) Philadelphia KiXX	Season-long loan; Philadelphia KiXX did not exercise their contract option on Antoniuk and he was permanently signed by Portland during the season	
August 1, 2005	(United States) Kevin Goldthwaite	DF	(United States) San Jose Earthquakes	Season-long loan with option to recall; recalled by San Jose Earthquakes for August 3 U.S. Open Cup game vs. Portland; returned to Portland on loan following the game	

==== Transfers out ====
Date	Player	Position	Destination club	Fee/notes	Ref
End of 2004 season	(United States) Dan Antoniuk	FW	N/A	Contract expired and not re-signed	
End of 2004 season	(United States) Alex Bengard	MF	N/A	Contract expired and not re-signed	
End of 2004 season	(United States) Erik Cronkrite	MF	N/A	Contract expired and not re-signed	
End of 2004 season	(United States) Bayard Elfvin	GK	N/A	Contract expired and not re-signed	
End of 2004 season	(United States) Andrew Gregor	MF	N/A	Contract expired and not re-signed	
End of 2004 season	(United States) Garrett Marcum	MF	N/A	Contract expired and not re-signed	
End of 2004 season	(United States) Jake Sagare	MF	N/A	Contract expired and not re-signed	
End of 2004 season	(United States) Josh Saunders	GK	N/A	Contract expired and not re-signed	
November 30, 2004	(United States) Alan Gordon	FW	(United States) Los Angeles Galaxy	Undisclosed	
May 26, 2005	(United States) Memo Arzate	MF	Unattached	Released	
June 15, 2005	(United States) David Henning	DF	Unattached	Released	
June 22, 2005	(United States) Aaron Heinzen	DF	Unattached	Released	
June 22, 2005	(United States) Shawn Saunders	DF	Unattached	Released	

==== Loans out ====
Date	Player	Position	Destination club	Fee/notes	Ref
October 18, 2004	(Mexico) Byron Alvarez	FW	(United States) Chicago Storm	Season-long loan with option to recall; recalled by Portland Timbers on March 29, 2005	

==== Unsigned draft picks ====
Date	Player	Position	Previous club	Notes	Ref
January 18, 2005	(United States) Justin Cook	FW	(United States) Ohio State Buckeyes (United States) Central Florida Kraze	USL-1 College Player Draft, 1st round	
January 18, 2005	(United States) Dan Kennedy	GK	(United States) UC Santa Barbara Gauchos (United States) Orange County Blue Star	USL-1 College Player Draft, 2nd round	

== Notes ==
A. It was announced on March 30 that Portland Baseball Investment Group, headed by Abe Alizadeh, had agreed to buy the Timbers and the Portland Beavers baseball club from the Pacific Coast League. The Timbers referred to Alizadeh as the Majority Owner in press releases throughout the 2005 season. However, the sale was not officially completed until June 16, 2006.
