= 2006 United Soccer Leagues =

United Soccer Leagues
- Season: 2006

Men's soccer
- USL First Division: Vancouver Whitecaps
- USL Second Division: Richmond Kickers

The 2006 USL season was the 20th edition of the United Soccer Leagues, an American soccer organization with several divisions.

== General ==
- Miami FC joined the First Division.
- The Richmond Kickers departed the First Division for the Second Division.
- The Northern Virginia Royals departed the Second Division for the Premier Development League (PDL).
- 9 new teams joined the PDL while 5 teams folded, for a complete list see here.

== Honors ==
| Competition | Champion | Runner-up | Regular season champion/Best USL team |
|---|---|---|---|
| USL First Division | Vancouver Whitecaps | Rochester Raging Rhinos | Montreal Impact |
| USL Second Division | Richmond Kickers | Charlotte Eagles | Richmond Kickers |
| USL PDL | Michigan Bucks | Laredo Heat | Carolina Dynamo |
| U.S. Open Cup | Chicago Fire (MLS) | Los Angeles Galaxy (MLS) | Carolina Dynamo (PDL) |
| Voyageurs Cup | Montreal Impact | Toronto Lynx | n/a |

== Standings ==
=== First Division ===
USL First Division
- Season: 2006
- Champions: Vancouver Whitecaps (1st Title)
- Regular Season title: Montreal Impact (2nd Title)
- Matches: 168
- Goals: 416 (2.48 per match)
- Best Player: (United States) Joey Gjertsen, Vancouver Whitecaps
- Top goalscorer: (Brazil) Romario, Miami FC (United States) Cam Weaver, Seattle Sounders (18 goals each)
- Best goalkeeper: (Canada) Greg Sutton, Montreal Impact

| Pos | Team | Pld | W | L | D | GF | GA | GD | Pts | Qualification |
|---|---|---|---|---|---|---|---|---|---|---|
| 1 | Montreal Impact (S) | 28 | 14 | 5 | 9 | 31 | 15 | +16 | 51 | Bye to semifinal round of playoffs |
| 2 | Rochester Raging Rhinos | 28 | 13 | 4 | 11 | 34 | 21 | +13 | 50 | Bye to semifinal round of playoffs |
| 3 | Charleston Battery | 28 | 13 | 8 | 7 | 33 | 25 | +8 | 46 (Note: CHA: 4 pts; VAN: 1 pt) | First round of playoffs |
| 4 | Vancouver Whitecaps (C) | 28 | 12 | 6 | 10 | 40 | 28 | +12 | 46 | First round of playoffs |
| 5 | Miami FC | 28 | 11 | 11 | 6 | 47 | 44 | +3 | 39 | First round of playoffs |
| 6 | Puerto Rico Islanders | 28 | 10 | 10 | 8 | 38 | 36 | +2 | 38 | First round of playoffs |
| 7 | Seattle Sounders | 28 | 11 | 13 | 4 | 42 | 48 | −6 | 37 | |
| 8 | Atlanta Silverbacks | 28 | 10 | 13 | 5 | 36 | 42 | −6 | 35 | |
| 9 | Virginia Beach Mariners | 28 | 8 | 12 | 8 | 26 | 37 | −11 | 32 (Note: VBM: 7 pts; TOR: 4 pts) | |
| 10 | Toronto Lynx | 28 | 8 | 12 | 8 | 30 | 36 | −6 | 32 | |
| 11 | Portland Timbers | 28 | 7 | 15 | 6 | 25 | 39 | −14 | 27 (Note: POR: 9 pts; MIN: 3 pts) | |
| 12 | Minnesota Thunder | 28 | 7 | 15 | 6 | 34 | 45 | −11 | 27 | |

(C) Playoff Champion; (S) Commissioner's Cup

==== Playoffs ====
Quarterfinals and Semifinals 2-game aggregate
Higher seeded team hosted first game

- Exception: Montreal hosted second game vs Vancouver

Quarterfinals
3 | Charleston Battery | 2 | 1 | 3
6 | Puerto Rico Islanders | 2 | 0 | 2
4 | Vancouver Whitecaps | 4 | 2 | 6
5 | Miami FC | 1 | 0 | 1

Semifinals
2 | Rochester Raging Rhinos | 1 | 0 | 1
3 | Charleston Battery | 0 | 0 | 0
4 | Vancouver Whitecaps (a.e.t.) | 0 | 2 | 2
1 | Montreal Impact | 0 | 0 | 0

Finals
2 | Rochester Raging Rhinos | 0
4 | Vancouver Whitecaps | 3

==== Quarterfinals ====
September 15, 2006
7:30 PM EDT

| Charleston Battery | 2–2 | Puerto Rico Islanders |
|---|---|---|
| Armstrong 53'; Nylen (yellow card) 57'; Glinton 89' | Report | Velez (yellow card) 6'; Marcina 22' (yellow card) 36'; Delgado (yellow card) 44'; Norambuena (yellow card) 56'; González 60'; Kennedy (yellow card) 86' |

Blackbaud Stadium
Charleston, South Carolina
Attendance: 2,215
Referee: Mark Kadlecik
September 17, 2006
7:30 PM EDT
Second Leg

| Puerto Rico Islanders | 0–1 | Charleston Battery |
|---|---|---|
| Piette (yellow card) 48'; Velez (yellow card) 60' | Report | Fuller (yellow card) 30'; Armstrong 54'; Alavanja (yellow card) 56' |

Juan Ramón Loubriel Stadium
Bayamón, Puerto Rico
Attendance: 8,745
Referee: Alex Prus

Charleston Battery won 3–2 on Aggregate.

September 15, 2006
10:00 PM EDT
First Leg

| Vancouver Whitecaps | 4–1 | Miami FC Blues |
|---|---|---|
| Testo 12'; Suarez (yellow card) 32'; Gjertsen 35'; Lyall 44'; Donatelli 88' | Report | Fraser (yellow card) 35'; Romário 64'; Gomez (yellow card) 72' |

Swangard Stadium
Burnaby, British Columbia
Attendance: 5,437
Referee: Steve DiPietro
September 17, 2006
6:00 PM EDT
Second Leg

| Miami FC Blues | 0–2 | Vancouver Whitecaps |
|---|---|---|
| Rodrigues (yellow card) 31'; Guillaume (yellow card) 52'; Gomez (yellow card) 72'; Fraser (yellow card) 73' | Report | Suarez (yellow card) 10'; Sebrango 46'; Nash 64' |

Tropical Park Stadium
Miami, Florida
Attendance: 2,111
Referee: Mark Greiger

Vancouver Whitecaps won 6–1 on Aggregate.

==== Semifinals ====
September 22, 2006
7:35 PM EDT
First Leg

| Rochester Raging Rhinos | 1–0 | Charleston Battery |
|---|---|---|
| Lines (yellow card) 30'; Howes 52' | Report | Daley (yellow card) 19' (yellow-red card) 42'; McKnight (yellow card) 81' |

PAETEC Park
Rochester, New York
Attendance: 9,038
Referee: Niko Bratsis
September 24, 2006
6:00 PM EDT
Second Leg

| Charleston Battery | 0–0 | Rochester Raging Rhinos |
|---|---|---|
| Fuller (yellow card) 11'; Armstrong (yellow card) 75' | Report | Martinez (yellow card) 52'; Craft (yellow card) 55'; Vallow (yellow card) 78'; Gbeke (yellow card) 90' |

Blackbaud Stadium
Charleston, South Carolina
Attendance: 2,121
Referee: Michael Hill

Rochester Raging Rhinos won 1–0 on Aggregate.

September 22, 2006
10:00 PM EDT
First Leg

| Vancouver Whitecaps | 0–0 | Montreal Impact |
|---|---|---|
| Sebrango (yellow card) 80' | Report | Braz (yellow card) 10'; Pizzolito (red card) 85' |

Swangard Stadium
Burnaby, British Columbia
Attendance: 5,225
Referee: Mark Budda
September 24, 2006
7:00 PM EDT
Second Leg

| Montreal Impact | 0–2 (a.e.t.) | Vancouver Whitecaps |
|---|---|---|
| Braz (yellow card) 23'; Vincello (yellow card) 95'; Fronimadis (yellow card) 120' | Report | Sebrango (yellow card) 15' (yellow-red card) 116', (goal) 115'; Nash (yellow card) 73'; Matondo (yellow card) 90'; Lyall (yellow card) 95'; Donatelli 120' |

Claude Robillard Sports Complex
Montreal, Quebec
Attendance: 11,782
Referee: Silviu Petrescu

Vancouver Whitecaps won 2–0 on Aggregate in Overtime.

==== Final ====
September 30, 2006
7:00 PM EDT

| Rochester Raging Rhinos | 0–3 | Vancouver Whitecaps |
|---|---|---|
| Ball (yellow card) 25'; Gbeke (yellow card) 71'; Craft (yellow card) 85'; Ambersley (yellow card) 88' | Report | Craft 45' (o.g.); Donatelli 55'; Jones (yellow card) 76'; Clarke (yellow card) 80'; Matondo 86', (yellow card) 86' |

PAETEC Park
Rochester, New York
Attendance: 9,547
Referee: Andrew Chapin

USL First Division
2006 champions
(Canada)
Vancouver Whitecaps FC
First title

==== Awards and All-League Teams ====
First Team
F: (Brazil) Romario (Miami FC) (Co-Leading Goalscorer); (United States) Cam Weaver (Seattle Sounders) (Co-Leading Goalscorer)
M: (United States) Ben Hollingsworth (Charleston Battery); (United States) Luke Kreamalmeyer (Portland Timbers); (Brazil) Zinho (Miami FC); (United States) Joey Gjertsen (Vancouver Whitecaps) (MVP)
D: (Canada) Gabriel Gervais (Montreal Impact) (Defender of the Year); (Canada) Geordie Lyall (Vancouver Whitecaps); (Chile) Mauricio Segovia (Puerto Rico Islanders); (United States) Andrew Gregor (Seattle Sounders)
G: (Canada) Greg Sutton (Montreal Impact) (Goalkeeper of the Year)
Coach: (United States) Michael Anhaeuser (Charleston Battery) (Coach of the Year)

Second Team
F: (Canada) Alen Marcina (Puerto Rico Islanders); (Jamaica) Greg Simmonds (Virginia Beach Mariners)
M: (Argentina) Leonardo Di Lorenzo (Montreal Impact); (Canada) Jeff Clarke (Vancouver Whitecaps); (Chile) Rodrigo Rios (Atlanta Silverbacks); (Turks and Caicos Islands) Gavin Glinton (Charleston Battery)
D: (Canada) Nevio Pizzolitto (Montreal Impact); (United States) Matt Bobo (Atlanta Silverbacks); (United States) Kenney Bertz (Rochester Raging Rhinos); (United States) Steve Klein (Vancouver Whitecaps)
G: (United States) Scott Vallow (Rochester Raging Rhinos)

=== Second Division ===
USL Second Division
- Season: 2006
- Champions: Richmond Kickers (2nd Title)
- Regular Season title: Richmond Kickers (2nd Title)
- Matches: 90
- Goals: 271 (3.01 per match)
- Best Player: (Uganda) Robert Ssejjemba, Richmond Kickers
- Top goalscorer: (Uganda) Robert Ssejjemba, Richmond Kickers (17 goals)
- Best goalkeeper: (United States) Ronnie Pascale, Richmond Kickers

| Pos | Team | Pld | W | L | D | GF | GA | GD | Pts | Qualification |
|---|---|---|---|---|---|---|---|---|---|---|
| 1 | Richmond Kickers (O) | 20 | 13 | 3 | 4 | 50 | 20 | +30 | 43 | Regular season champion |
| 2 | Charlotte Eagles | 20 | 8 | 4 | 8 | 29 | 27 | +2 | 32 | Playoff berth clinched |
| 3 | Pittsburgh Riverhounds | 20 | 8 | 6 | 6 | 27 | 20 | +7 | 30 | Playoff berth clinched |
| 4 | Cincinnati Kings | 20 | 9 | 8 | 3 | 28 | 27 | +1 | 30 | Playoff berth clinched |
| 5 | New Hampshire Phantoms | 20 | 9 | 10 | 1 | 27 | 43 | −16 | 27 (Note: New Hampshire was penalized 1 point for use of an ineligible player in a game.) | |
| 6 | Western Mass Pioneers | 20 | 8 | 9 | 3 | 31 | 28 | +3 | 27 | |
| 7 | Harrisburg City Islanders | 20 | 8 | 9 | 3 | 34 | 35 | −1 | 27 | |
| 8 | Wilmington Hammerheads | 20 | 4 | 9 | 7 | 30 | 31 | −1 | 19 | |
| 9 | Long Island Rough Riders | 20 | 3 | 12 | 5 | 15 | 40 | −25 | 14 | |

(O) Play-off winners

==== Playoffs ====
Semifinals
1 | Richmond Kickers | 2 | 0 | 2
4 | Cincinnati Kings | 1 | 0 | 1
3 | Pittsburgh Riverhounds | 0 | 1 | 1
2 | Charlotte Eagles | 4 | 2 | 6

Finals
1 | Richmond Kickers | 2
2 | Charlotte Eagles | 1

==== Semifinals ====
August 18, 2006
7:00 PM EDT
First Leg

| Richmond Kickers | 2–1 | Cincinnati Kings |
|---|---|---|
| Watson 40'; Burke 60' (pen.) | Report | Fiore (yellow card) 14'; Krause (yellow card) 31'; Barton 45'; Jones (yellow card) 47' |

University of Richmond Stadium
Richmond, Virginia
Attendance: 2,187
Referee: James Conlee
August 20, 2006
6:00 PM EDT
Second Leg

| Cincinnati Kings | 0–0 | Richmond Kickers |
|---|---|---|
| McGinlay (yellow card) 11'; Smith (yellow card) 75' | Report | Knight (yellow card) 76' |

XU Soccer Complex
Cincinnati, Ohio
Attendance: 1,465
Referee: Rizal Milliken

Richmond Kickers won 2–1 on aggregate.

August 18, 2006
7:05 PM EDT
First Leg

| Pittsburgh Riverhounds | 0–4 | Charlotte Eagles |
|---|---|---|
| Chevalier (yellow card) 79' | Report | Meek 2' (yellow card) 75'; Rife 59'; Budnyy 64'; Ruud 86' |

Falconi Field
Washington, Pennsylvania
Attendance: 2,113
Referee: CJ Morgante
August 19, 2006
7:00 PM EDT
Second Leg

| Charlotte Eagles | 2–1 | Pittsburgh Riverhounds |
|---|---|---|
| Kabwe 42'; Budnyy 76' | Report | Flavius 14' (yellow card) 50'; Child (red card) 76'; Bragg (yellow card) 77'; Browne (red card) 90' |

Waddell Stadium
Charlotte, North Carolina
Attendance: 813
Referee: Jason Sessions

Charlotte Eagles won 6–1 on Aggregate.

==== Final ====
August 26, 2006
7:00 p.m.

| Richmond Kickers | 2–1 | Charlotte Eagles |
|---|---|---|
| Ssejjemba 9' (pen.); Carrieri 34' (yellow card) 34' | Report | Spencer 90' |

University of Richmond Stadium
Richmond, Virginia
Attendance: 3,288
Referee: Daniel Stead

== See also ==
- 2006 PDL season
