= 2006 in American soccer =

Soccer in the United States
- Season: 2006

Men's soccer
- Supporters' Shield: D.C. United
- USL First Division: Vancouver Whitecaps
- USL Second Division: Richmond Kickers
- NPSL: Sacramento Knights
- PDL: Michigan Bucks
- US Open Cup: Chicago Fire Soccer Club
- MLS Cup: Houston Dynamo

The 2006 season was the 94th year of competitive soccer in the United States.

== National team ==
=== Men ===
==== Senior ====
Wins	Losses	Draws
6	4	3

The home team or the team that is designated as the home team is listed in the left column; the away team is in the right column.

Win Draw Loss

January 22 International Friendly	United States	0 – 0	Canada	San Diego
17:00 UTC−08		(Report)		Stadium: Torero Stadium; Attendance: 6,077; Referee: Benito Archundia (Mexico)

January 29 International Friendly	United States	5 – 0	Norway	Carson, California
14:00 UTC−08	Twellman 5' 17' 76'; Pope 67'; Chris Klein 87'	(Report)		Stadium: Home Depot Center; Attendance: 16,366; Referee: Óscar Ruiz (Colombia)

February 10 International Friendly	United States	3 – 2	Japan	San Francisco
20:00 UTC−08	Pope 24'; Dempsey 39'; Twellman 50'	(Report)	Maki 60'; Nakazawa 90'	Stadium: SBC Park; Attendance: 37,365; Referee: Horacio Elizondo (Argentina)

February 19 International Friendly	United States	4 – 0	Guatemala	Frisco, Texas
13:00 UTC−06	Olsen 38'; Ching 45'; Johnson 47'; Klein 71'	(Report)		Stadium: Pizza Hut Park; Attendance: 14,453; Referee: Mauricio Navarro (Canada)

March 1 International Friendly	Poland	0 – 1	United States	Kaiserslautern, Germany
20:00 UTC+01		(Report)	Dempsey 49'	Stadium: Fritz Walter Stadion; Attendance: 13,395; Referee: Thorsten Kinhofer (Germany)

March 22 International Friendly	Germany	4 – 1	United States	Dortmund, Germany
20:30 UTC+01	Schweinsteiger 46'; Neuville 73'; Klose 75'; Ballack 79'	(Report)	Cherundolo 85'	Stadium: Signal Iduna Park; Attendance: 64,500; Referee: Peter Frojdfeldt (Sweden)

April 11 International Friendly	United States	1 – 1	Jamaica	Cary, North Carolina
15:00 UTC−04	Olsen 27'	(Report)	Bennett 4'	Stadium: SAS Soccer Park; Attendance: 8,093; Referee: Jorge Gasso Flores (Mexico)

May 23 International Friendly	United States	0 – 1	Morocco	Nashville, Tennessee
18:00 UTC−06		(Report)	Madihi 90+1'	Stadium: Nashville Coliseum; Attendance: 26,141; Referee: Mauricio Navarro (Canada)

May 26 International Friendly	United States	2 – 0	Venezuela	Cleveland, Ohio
19:00 UTC−05	Ching 36'; Dempsey 69'	(Report)		Stadium: Cleveland Browns Stadium; Attendance: 29,745; Referee: Mauricio Morales Valle (Mexico)

May 28 International Friendly	United States	1 – 0	Latvia	East Hartford, Connecticut
19:00 UTC−05	McBride 43'	(Report)		Stadium: Rentschler Field; Attendance: 24,636; Referee: Steven Dipiero (Canada)

June 12 World Cup Group Stage	United States	0 – 3	Czech Republic	Gelsenkirchen, Germany
18:00 UTC+02		(Report)	Koller 5'; Rosický 36', 76'	Stadium: Arena AufSchalke; Attendance: 52,000; Referee: Carlos Amarilla (Paraguay)

June 17 World Cup Group Stage	Italy	1 – 1	United States	Kaiserslautern, Germany
21:00 UTC+02	Gilardino 22'	(Report)	Zaccardo 27' (o.g.)	Stadium: Fritz Walter Stadion; Attendance: 46,000; Referee: Jorge Larrionda (Uruguay)

June 22 World Cup Group Stage	Ghana	2 – 1	United States	Nuremberg, Germany
16:00 UTC+02	Dramani 22'; Appiah 45+2'	(Report)	Dempsey 43'	Stadium: Frankenstadion; Attendance: 41,000; Referee: Markus Merk (Germany)

=== Women ===
==== Senior ====
Wins	Losses	Draws
18	0	4

===== Four Nations Tournament =====
January 18	United States	3–1	Norway	Guangzhou, China
	Lilly 72'; Boxx 77'; Wambach 85'	(Report)	Rønning 81' (pen.)

January 20	United States	0–0	France	Guangzhou, China
		(Report)

January 22	China	0–2	United States	Guangzhou, China
		(Report)	Lilly 24' (pen.), 41'

===== Algarve Cup =====
March 9 Group B	United States	0–0	China	Faro, Portugal
		(Report)

March 11 Group B	United States	5–0	Denmark	Quarteira, Portugal
	Wambach 16'; O'Reilly 29', 31'; Lilly 42'; Kai 72'	(Report)

March 13 Group B	United States	4–1	France	Faro, Portugal
	Lilly 1'; Wagner 49'; Tarpley 50'; Kai 76'	(Report)	Hoda 64'

March 15 Final	Germany	0–0 (a.e.t.) (4–3 p)	United States	Faro, Portugal
		(Report)		Stadium: Estádio do Algarve
	Penalties
	Behringer (penalty scored); Pohlers (penalty scored); Prinz (penalty missed); Da Mbabi (penalty scored); Wimbersky (penalty scored)		(penalty scored) Wagner; (penalty missed) Boxx; (penalty scored) Whitehill; (penalty missed) Wambach; (penalty scored) Lilly

===== International Friendlies =====
May 7	Japan	1–3	United States	Kumamoto, Japan
		(Report)

May 9	Japan	0-1	United States	Osaka, Japan
		(Report)

July 15	United States	3–2	Sweden	Blaine, Minnesota
	Wambach 38'; Whitehill 89'; Lilly 90+2'	(Report)	Unknown (46-88); Ekblom 90+1'	Stadium: National Sports Center; Attendance: 4,996

July 23	United States	5–0	Republic of Ireland	San Diego, California
		(Report)

July 30	United States	2–0	Canada	Cary, North Carolina
		(Report)

August 27	United States	4–1	China	Bridgeview, Illinois
		(Report)

September 13	United States	3–1	Mexico	Rochester, New York
		(Report)

October 1	United States	10–0	Chinese Taipei	Carson, California
4:00 p.m. UTC−04	Osborne 8'; Wambach 13', 51', 62'; Tarpley 22', 27'; Lilly 49'; Lloyd 76'; Rapinoe 79', 82'	(Report)		Stadium: The Home Depot Center; Attendance: 5,479; Referee: Jennifer Bennett; Assistant referees: Veronica Perez; Margaret Domka; Fourth official: Marlene Duffy

October 8	United States	2–1	Iceland	Richmond, Virginia
		(Report)

===== Peace Queen Cup =====
October 29 Group B	United States	1–1	Denmark	Kimhae, South Korea
3:00 a.m. UTC−05	Lilly 73'	(Report)	Andersen 12'	Stadium: Gimhae Stadium; Attendance: 8,200; Referee: Shin Hwa Yeon (KOR); Assistant referees: Lee Seul Gi (KOR); Choi Mi Kyeong (KOR); Fourth official: Kim Mi Ok (KOR)

October 31 Group B	Australia	0–2	United States	Cheonan, South Korea
16:00		(Report)	Lilly 20'; Kai 35'	Stadium: Cheonan Stadium

November 2 Group B	Netherlands	0–2	United States	Suwon, South Korea
14:30		(Report)	Tarpley 27'; Whitehill 45+1'	Stadium: Suwon World Cup Stadium

November 2 Final	Canada	0–1	United States	Seoul, South Korea
14:30		(Report)	Lilly 69'	Stadium: Seoul World Cup Stadium

===== Gold Cup =====
November 22 Semifinals	United States	2–0	Mexico	Carson, California
19:00	Wambach 10', 64'	(Report)		Stadium: The Home Depot Center

November 26 Final	Canada	1–2 (aet)	United States	Carson, California
17:30	Hermuss 44'	(Report)	Osborne 6'; Lilly 120' (pen.)	Stadium: The Home Depot Center; Attendance: 6,749

== Major League Soccer ==
=== Tables ===
Purple indicates Supporters' Shield clinched
Yellow indicates Regular Season Runners-up clinched
Green indicates playoff berth clinched

==== Eastern Conference ====
Place	Team	P	W	L	T	GF	GA	GD	Points
1	D.C. United	32	15	7	10	52	38	+14	55
2	New England Revolution	32	12	8	12	39	35	+4	48
3	Chicago Fire	32	13	11	8	43	41	+2	47
4	New York Red Bulls	32	9	11	12	41	41	0	39
5	Kansas City Wizards	32	10	14	8	43	45	-2	38
6	Columbus Crew	32	8	15	9	30	42	-12	33

==== Western Conference ====
Place	Team	P	W	L	T	GF	GA	GD	Points
1	FC Dallas	32	16	12	4	48	44	+4	52
2	Houston Dynamo	32	11	8	13	44	40	+4	46
3	C.D. Chivas USA	32	10	9	13	45	42	+3	43
4	Colorado Rapids	32	11	13	8	36	49	-13	41
5	Los Angeles Galaxy	32	11	15	6	37	37	0	39
6	Real Salt Lake	32	10	13	9	45	49	-4	39

=== Playoffs ===
Conference Semifinals
1	D.C. United	1	1	2
4	New York Red Bulls	0	1	1
Eastern Conference
3	Chicago Fire	1	1	2
2	New England Revolution (a.e.t., p.s.o.)	0	2	2
1	FC Dallas	2	2	4
4	Colorado Rapids (a.e.t., p.s.o.)	1	3	4
Western Conference
3	Chivas USA	2	0	2
2	Houston Dynamo	1	2	3

Conference Finals
1	D.C. United	0
2	New England Revolution	1
4	Colorado Rapids	1
2	Houston Dynamo	3

MLS Cup 2006
E	New England Revolution	1
W	Houston Dynamo (a.e.t., p.s.o.)	1

=== MLS Cup ===
November 12
13:30 UTC−06

Houston Dynamo	1 – 1 (a.e.t.)	New England Revolution
Ching 114'	(Report)	Twellman 113'
Penalties
(penalty scored) Gray; (penalty scored) Holden; (penalty scored) De Rosario; (penalty missed) Davis; (penalty scored) Ching	4–3	Joseph (penalty scored); Reis (penalty scored); Noonan (penalty missed); Twellman (penalty scored); Heaps (penalty missed)

Pizza Hut Park, Frisco, Texas
Attendance: 22,427
Referee: Jair Marrufo

== USL Division 1 ==
=== Table ===
Commissioner's Cup, bye to semifinal round of playoffs
Bye to semifinal round of playoffs
First round of playoffs

Pos	Club	Pts	Pld	W	L	T	GF	GA	GD	H2H Pts
1	Montreal Impact	51	28	14	5	9	31	15	+16	
2	Rochester Raging Rhinos	50	28	13	4	11	34	21	+13	
3	Charleston Battery	46	28	13	8	7	33	25	+8	CHA: 4 pts VAN: 1 pt
4	Vancouver Whitecaps	46	28	12	6	10	40	28	+12	CHA: 4 pts VAN: 1 pt
5	Miami FC	39	28	11	11	6	47	44	+3	
6	Puerto Rico Islanders	38	28	10	10	8	38	36	+2	
7	Seattle Sounders	37	28	11	13	4	42	48	−6	
8	Atlanta Silverbacks	35	28	10	13	5	36	42	−6	
9	Virginia Beach Mariners	32	28	8	12	8	26	37	−11	VAB: 7 pts TOR: 4 pts
10	Toronto Lynx	32	28	8	12	8	30	36	−6	VAB: 7 pts TOR: 4 pts
11	Portland Timbers	27	28	7	15	6	25	39	−14	POR: 9 pts MIN: 3 pts
12	Minnesota Thunder	27	28	7	15	6	34	45	−11	POR: 9 pts MIN: 3 pts

==== Playoffs ====
Quarterfinals and Semifinals 2-game aggregate
Higher seeded team hosted first game

- Exception: Montreal hosted second game vs Vancouver

Quarterfinals
3	Charleston Battery	2	1	3
6	Puerto Rico Islanders	2	0	2
4	Vancouver Whitecaps	4	2	6
5	Miami FC	1	0	1

Semifinals
2	Rochester Raging Rhinos	1	0	1
3	Charleston Battery	0	0	0
4	Vancouver Whitecaps (a.e.t.)	0	2	2
1	Montreal Impact	0	0	0

Finals
2	Rochester Raging Rhinos	0
4	Vancouver Whitecaps	3

=== Final ===
September 29

Rochester Raging Rhinos	0 – 3	Vancouver Whitecaps
	(Report)	Craft 45' (o.g.); Donatelli 54'; Matondo 86'

PAETEC Park, Rochester, New York

== USL Second Division ==
=== Table ===
Purple indicates regular season champion
Green indicates playoff berth clinched

Place	Team	P	W	L	T	GF	GA	GD	Points
1	Richmond Kickers	20	13	3	4	50	20	+30	43
2	Charlotte Eagles	20	8	4	8	29	27	+2	32
3	Pittsburgh Riverhounds	20	8	6	6	27	20	+7	30
4	Cincinnati Kings	20	9	8	3	28	27	+1	30
5	New Hampshire Phantoms	20	9	10	1	27	43	-16	27^{1}
6	Western Mass Pioneers	20	8	9	3	31	28	+3	27
7	Harrisburg City Islanders	20	8	9	3	34	35	-1	27
8	Wilmington Hammerheads	20	4	9	7	30	31	-1	19
9	Long Island Rough Riders	20	3	12	5	15	40	-25	14

^{1}New Hampshire was penalized 1 point for use of an ineligible player in a game.

=== Playoffs ===
Semifinals
1	Richmond Kickers	2	0	2
4	Cincinnati Kings	1	0	1
3	Pittsburgh Riverhounds	0	1	1
2	Charlotte Eagles	4	2	6

Finals
1	Richmond Kickers	2
2	Charlotte Eagles	1

=== Final ===
August 28

Richmond Kickers	2 – 1	Charlotte Eagles
Ssejjemba 9' (pen.); Carrieri 33'	(Report)	Spencer 90'

University of Richmond Stadium, Richmond, Virginia

== Lamar Hunt U.S. Open Cup ==
Home teams listed on top of bracket

Third Round; July 12
MLS	Kansas City	2
PDL	Des Moines	1
USL1	Rochester	5
USL2	New Hampshire	1
PDL	Michigan	1
MLS	Columbus	4
USL2	Wilmington	2
USL1	Atlanta	1
MLS	Chivas USA	0 (2)
USASA	Roma FC (AET, PSO)	0 (4)
MLS	Real Salt Lake (AET)	2
USL1	Virginia Beach	1
PDL	Carolina (AET)	3
USL1	Seattle	2
USL1	Charleston	3
USL1	Portland	1

Fourth Round; August 2
MLS	Chicago	2
MLS	Kansas City	0
USL1	Rochester	0 (4)
MLS	New England (AET, PSO)	0 (5)
MLS	D.C. United (AET)	2
MLS	Columbus	1
USL2	Wilmington	1
MLS	New York	2
MLS	Los Angeles	2
USASA	Roma FC	0
MLS	Real Salt Lake	0
MLS	Colorado	1
MLS	Houston	4
PDL	Carolina	2
USL1	Charleston	3 (3)
MLS	FC Dallas (AET, PSO)	3 (5)

Quarterfinals; August 23
MLS	Chicago	2
MLS	New England	1
MLS	D.C. United	3
MLS	New York	1
MLS	Los Angeles (AET)	3
MLS	Colorado	1
MLS	Houston	3
MLS	FC Dallas	0

Semifinals; September 6
MLS	Chicago	3
MLS	D.C. United	0
MLS	Los Angeles	3
MLS	Houston	1

Finals; September 27
MLS	Chicago	3
MLS	Los Angeles	1

=== Final ===
September 27
20:00 UTC−05

Los Angeles Galaxy	1 – 3	Chicago Fire
Gordon 51'	(Report)	Jaqua 10'; Herron 16'; Thiago 88'

Toyota Park, Bridgeview, Illinois
Attendance: 8,185
Referee: Terry Vaughn

== American clubs in international competitions ==
Club	Competition	Final round
Los Angeles Galaxy	2006 CONCACAF Champions' Cup	Quarterfinals
New England Revolution	2006 CONCACAF Champions' Cup	Quarterfinals

=== Los Angeles Galaxy ===
February 23 Champions Cup Semifinal	Los Angeles (United States)	0 – 0	(Costa Rica) Deportivo Saprissa	Carson, California
				Stadium: Home Depot Center; Attendance: 8,103; Referee: Marco Rodríguez (Mexico)

March 8 Champions Cup Semifinal	Deportivo Saprissa (Costa Rica)	3 – 2 (a.e.t.)	(United States) Los Angeles	San José, Costa Rica
	Centeno 46'; Solis 57'; Parks 90+5'		Gardner 21'; Donovan 41'	Stadium: Estadio Ricardo Saprissa; Attendance: 8,103; Referee: Benito Archundia (Mexico)

=== New England Revolution ===
February 22 Champions Cup Semifinal	New England (United States)	0 – 0	(Costa Rica) Alajuelense	Hamilton, Bermuda
				Stadium: Bermuda National Stadium; Attendance: 1,500; Referee: Hu Liu (Canada)

March 8 Champions Cup Semifinal	Alajuelense (Costa Rica)	1 – 0	(United States) New England	Alajuela, Costa Rica
	Hernández 90'			Stadium: Estadio Alejandro Morera Soto; Attendance: 1,500; Referee: Peter Prendergast (Jamaica)
