= Charlie Lyon =

American soccer player (born 1992)

Personal information
- Full name: Charles Lyon
- Date of birth: April 10, 1992 (age 34)
- Place of birth: St. Charles, Illinois, U.S.
- Height: 1.88 m (6 ft 2 in)
- Position: Goalkeeper

Youth career
- 2008–2010: Campton United

College career
Years	Team	Apps	(Gls)
2010–2014	Marquette Golden Eagles	63	(0)

Senior career*
Years	Team	Apps	(Gls)
2013–2014	Chicago Fire U-23	16	(0)
2015–2016	Seattle Sounders FC	0	(0)
2015–2016	→ Tacoma Defiance (loan)	41	(0)
2017	Orange County SC	31	(0)
2018	Los Angeles FC	0	(0)
2019–2020	MLS Pool	–	(–)
2019	→ Portland Timbers 2 (loan)	0	(0)
2019	→ Philadelphia Union (loan)	0	(0)
2020	→ Sporting Kansas City (loan)	0	(0)
2020	→ FC Dallas (loan)	0	(0)

Managerial career
- 2021–2022: Saint Mary's Gaels (goalkeeping)
- * Club domestic league appearances and goals

Charles Lyon (born April 10, 1992) is an American soccer coach and former player.

== Career ==
=== College and amateur ===
Lyon spent his entire college career at Marquette University. After medically redshirting his first year in 2010, Lyon made a total of 63 appearances for the Golden Eagles and finished his career with a 0.83 GAA and recorded 29 clean sheets.

He also played in the PDL for Chicago Fire U-23.

=== Professional ===
On January 20, 2015, Lyon was selected in the fourth round (75th overall) in the 2015 MLS SuperDraft by Seattle Sounders FC. He signed a professional contract with the club on March 17. He made his professional debut for USL affiliate club Seattle Sounders FC 2 in a 4–2 victory against Sacramento Republic FC. After being released by the Sounders, Lyon went to Minnesota United FC for a trial period ahead of their inaugural MLS season. The trial didn't work out, and on February 15, 2017, Lyon signed a contract with Orange County SC.

Lyon joined MLS side Los Angeles FC on March 2, 2018, ahead of their inaugural season. On May 22, 2018, he made his LAFC debut in a friendly against Borussia Dortmund. He was released by LAFC at the end of the season and became the MLS pool goalkeeper, joining various teams for short stints to fill unoccupied roster spots for goalkeepers. He is currently based in Portland, Oregon, and trains with the Portland Timbers. Lyon's contract as MLS pool goalkeeper was not renewed in 2020 and he was hired by a logging company in Southwestern Washington amid the COVID-19 pandemic. He was then selected to join the MLS is Back Tournament as the pool goalkeeper. During the tournament, Lyon was brought in as Sporting KC's backup keeper for a match after Tim Melia's red card against Minnesota United. Then, when Vancouver Whitecaps FC were left with only a 20-year-old, third-string keeper, Lyon was prevented from helping the Canadian side over complications with his international transfer certificate. In September 2020, FC Dallas added Lyon to shore up their squad for matches against Minnesota United and Houston Dynamo.

Lyon is currently serving as a Professional Firefighter for Sun City Fire and Medical Department in Sun City, Arizona.

== Coaching ==
Following his retirement from playing, Lyon took the role of goalkeeping coach at the Saint Mary's Gaels soccer team.

== Honors ==
Seattle Sounders FC

- MLS Cup: 2016
