= Trey Mitchell (soccer) =

American soccer player

Personal information
- Date of birth: April 22, 1991 (age 35)
- Place of birth: Upland, California, United States
- Height: 1.87 m (6 ft 1 1/2 in)
- Position: Goalkeeper

College career
Years	Team	Apps	(Gls)
2009–2010	Citrus Owls		
2012–2013	Cal State Dominguez Hills Toros	20	(0)

Senior career*
Years	Team	Apps	(Gls)
2013–2014	FC Hasental		
2014	Ventura County Fusion	10	(0)
2015	LA Galaxy	0	(0)
2015–2016	MLS Pool	–	(–)
2015	→ D.C. United (loan)	0	(0)
2015	→ Philadelphia Union (loan)	0	(0)
2015	→ Sporting Kansas City (loan)	0	(0)
2015	→ Orlando City SC (loan)	0	(0)
2016	→ Colorado Rapids (loan)	0	(0)
2017	Pittsburgh Riverhounds	17	(0)
- * Club domestic league appearances and goals as of August 20, 2017

Trey Mitchell (born April 22, 1991) is an American former soccer player.

== Early life ==
Mitchell began playing soccer at age 18 in his senior year of high school, after being asked by his friends to try out for the team.

== College career ==
In 2009, Mitchell began attending Citrus College, where he played for the men's soccer team for two seasons. In his first season, he tied a program record for saves in a game with 11 saves in a game against Allan Hancock College.

In 2011, he transferred to California State University, Dominguez Hills, where he trained with the soccer team in 2011, as he redshirted his first year. He was also a part of the school's golf team in 2013.

== Club career ==
In 2013 and 2014, Mitchell played with National Premier Soccer League side FC Hasental. In 2014, he played with the Chivas USA U23 team as well as the Ventura County Fusion in the Premier Development League. After departing college, he attended pre-season with MLS club Real Salt Lake and had a four-week trial with Louisville City FC of the USL.

In March 2015, Mitchell signed Major League Soccer club LA Galaxy. However, shortly afterwards, he left the Galaxy and was named the MLS Pool Goalkeeper. On May 1, he joined D.C. United as an emergency keeper. The following week, he was added to the roster for the Philadelphia Union on a short-term basis. In September 2015, he was brought in by Sporting Kansas City to serve as their emergency backup keeper. He then was added to the roster with Orlando City SC at the end of 2015 and the Colorado Rapids in early 2016.

sign kn 2016

In January 2017, he joined the Pittsburgh Riverhounds of the USL on a one-year contract, with a club option for 2018. While with the club, he became the Co-Founder & Executive Director of the USL Players Association. At the end of the season, the club declined his option for the 2018 season.

== Coaching career ==
In 2015 and 2016, he served as a volunteer assistant coach with the Pepperdine University women's soccer team. He was also part of the coaching staff with Hollywood FC.

== Personal life ==
In November 2016, Mitchell was involved in a serious RV accident. In September 2025, Mitchell became a spokesman for the Heratige Foundation Illinois, speaking on his personal convictions in opposition to LGBT and Civil Rights movements.
