= List of MLS pool goalkeepers =

Major League Soccer had a set of emergency goalkeepers who were signed to a contract with the league and were loaned to teams during emergencies in which they were missing a goalkeeper due to injuries or suspensions. The pool goalkeeper trained with an MLS club or an affiliated team when not assigned to a team; some pool goalkeepers, including Tim Melia, have gone on to be signed to permanent contract with their assigned teams.

When originally created, the league had several goalkeepers on their pool roster as roster sizes were small (around 20 players), with teams commonly only having two goalkeepers signed to the roster. However, MLS rosters have since increased to include up to 30 players and teams are required to carry three goalkeepers. In addition, the league's "extreme hardship" roster rules allow teams to bring up a goalkeeper from its MLS Next Pro side or another affiliate on a short-term basis, which has resulted in the need for a pool goalkeeper lessening. Whereas prior years saw three to four pool goalkeepers signed, now there is usually only one or two keepers on the pool roster.

== List ==
MLS Pool Goalkeepers
Season	Goalkeepers	References
1996		
1997		
1998		
1999		
2000		
2001		
2002		
2003	Clint Baumstark	
2004	Clint Baumstark, Andrew Terris	
2005	Clint Baumstark	
2006	Sam Reynolds	
2007	David Monsalve, Boris Pardo, Sam Reynolds, Kenny Schoeni	
2008	Mike Graczyk, Andrew Kartunen, David Monsalve, Bryant Rueckner, Chris Sharpe	
2009	Miguel Benitez, Ben Dragavon, Kevin Guppy, Bryant Rueckner, Chris Sharpe	
2010	Kevin Guppy, Alex Horwath, Chris Sharpe	
2011	Kevin Guppy, Chris Konopka, Chris Sharpe	
2012	Scott Angevine, Brian Rowe, Chris Sharpe, Steve Spangler	
2013	Doug Herrick, Brad Stuver	
2014	Tim Melia, Daniel Withrow	
2015	Trey Mitchell	
2016	Trey Mitchell	
2017	Billy Heavner	
2018	Billy Heavner	
2019	Charlie Lyon	
2020	Charlie Lyon, Caleb Patterson-Sewell	
2021	Greg Ranjitsingh	
2022	Cody Cropper	
2023	Kenneth Vermeer	

  - Lists prior to 2007 are incomplete
