= Kevin Guppy =

American soccer player (born 1987)

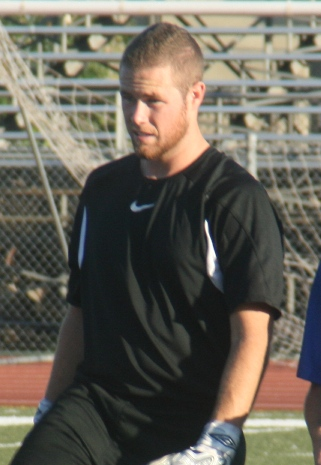
- Guppy playing for the SFV Quakes in 2007

Personal information
- Full name: Kevin Guppy
- Date of birth: January 29, 1987 (age 39)
- Place of birth: Chino Hills, California, U.S.
- Height: 6 ft 1 in (1.85 m)
- Position: Goalkeeper

College career
Years	Team	Apps	(Gls)
2005–2008	Northridge Matadors		

Senior career*
Years	Team	Apps	(Gls)
2006–2008	San Fernando Valley Quakes	43	(0)
2009–2011	MLS Pool	–	(–)
2009	→ Chivas USA (loan)	0	(0)
2009	→ Toronto FC (loan)	0	(0)
2009	→ Seattle Sounders FC (loan)	0	(0)
2010	→ Chivas USA (loan)	1	(0)
2011	→ Portland Timbers (loan)	0	(0)
- * Club domestic league appearances and goals as of October 20, 2010

Kevin Guppy (born January 29, 1987) is an American former professional soccer player.

== Career ==
=== Youth and amateur ===
Guppy was a two-sport athlete at Chino Hills High School, where he played four years of soccer under head coach Kyle Shuler, earning All-Sierra League accolades his last two years and being named team MVP in his freshman and sophomore campaigns. His second sport was football.

He went on to play four years of college soccer at California State University, Northridge as a goalkeeper, where he received All-Big West Honors four straight years, after being named to the First Team in 2005 in 2008, the Honorable Mention list in 2006, and the Second Team in 2007. In addition, he earned third-team College Soccer News All-Freshman, first-team All-Big West Conference and Goalkeeper of the Year honors in his first season at Northridge.

During his college years Guppy also spent three seasons with the San Fernando Valley Quakes of the USL Premier Development League, helping them reach the PDL playoffs in 2007 and 2008, and making 43 career appearances overall.

=== Professional ===
Undrafted out of college, Guppy signed with the Major League Soccer as the league pool goalkeeper in 2009, providing cover for any MLS team whose goalkeepers are injured. Despite training in the most part with Los Angeles Galaxy, Guppy was called up to provide cover at Chivas USA, Toronto FC and Seattle Sounders FC, but never saw any minutes in his debut professional year.

Guppy spent most of 2010 on call for Chivas USA; he was on the Chivas USA bench on numerous occasions during the season due to injuries to Dan Kennedy and Zach Thornton, before making his first team debut on September 14, 2010, in an international friendly against Chivas Guadalajara, even saving a spot kick during his team's 4–2 victory on penalties. He was formally added to the regular Chivas gameday roster in October 2010 due to Dan Kennedy's season-ending injury, and made his MLS debut on October 20, 2010, starting in goal against the San Jose Earthquakes.

Guppy was not retained by Chivas USA at the end of the 2010 season, and re-signed with the MLS Goalkeeper Pool in 2011. He was called up by the Portland Timbers in March 2011 for their US Open Cup game – ironically against Chivas USA – as cover for the injured Troy Perkins and Adin Brown, but did not feature in the game, and has been training with Los Angeles Galaxy for the majority of the rest of the 2011 season.

=== Post-soccer career ===
Guppy retired from professional soccer following the conclusion of the 2012 season. He currently works as an emergency medical technician, and resides in Fullerton, California, with his wife Brittany Van Voorhis.
