= Utah Blitzz =

- Full name: Utah Blitzz Football Club
- Nickname: The Blitzz
- Founded: 2000
- Dissolved: 2004
- Ground: Rice-Eccles Stadium; Salt Lake City, Utah
- Capacity: 45,634
- Owner: (United States) Jon Garff
- Head Coach: (United States) Chris Agnello
- League: USL Pro Select League
- 2004: 1st, Western Conference; Playoffs: Champions
Home colors	Away colors

Utah Blitzz was an American professional soccer team based in Salt Lake City, Utah. The team played in the USL Pro Select League (later known as the USL Second Division). The club was founded in 2000 but folded following the 2004 season to make way for the Major League Soccer franchise, Real Salt Lake, to begin play in 2005. During its short existence, the club was very successful, winning two league titles in total while finishing first or second in the Western Conference every season. The club played its home games at Rice-Eccles Stadium on the campus of the University of Utah.

== History ==
The Utah Blitzz Football Club was founded in 2000 by ANA Sports Management a division of ANA Development a Commercial Real Estate and Property Development Company, joining the third division of professional soccer in the United States, playing in the USL Pro Select League (also known as the USL D3 Pro League and later as the USL Second Division). The team would play its home games out of Rice-Eccles Stadium on the campus of the University of Utah, but had plans to build its own soccer specific stadium. The club began its first season with Chris Agnello as head coach and Stacy McNicol as Director of Operations, both of whom would later become co-owners. After the success of the franchise in the first season with the "soccer" fans in Utah, plans were made to bring in some new and more experience players. Due to scheduling conflicts with the University of Utah's Rice Eccles Stadium and the Utes Football Team, the Blitzz were forced to look for a new home pitch. Utah new to professional soccer did not have the facilities to provide a stadium for the team. A deal was made with Brigham Young University for the use of their soccer field and home games for the 2001 season were moved to that facility. Prior to the 2004 season, majority ownership was sold to the Ken Garff family, with Bob Garff as chairman Ken Garff Automotive Group based in Utah and his son, Jon Garff, overseeing ownership of the team.

Agnello would lead the Blitzz to a USL Pro Select League title in only its second season, with consecutive first-place finishes in the Western Conference from 2001-2004 and ending the club's final season with a second League championship in 2004.

On July 12, 2004, the country's first division pro league, Major League Soccer, announced that an expansion franchise had been awarded to Salt Lake City, with the new team to begin play in 2005. Following the championship victory in the 2004 season, the Blitzz ownership decided it would be best to step aside and not compete for attention or fans with the new MLS club. However, due to the success of the Blitzz, many staff and players would find a role in the Real Salt Lake (RSL) organization, including Agnello, who would go on to serve as a first team assistant coach for RSL.

== Year-by-year ==
Year	Division	League	Reg. season	Playoffs	Open Cup	Attendance
2000	3	USL D-3 Pro League	2nd, Western	Conference Finals	Did not qualify	2,997
2001	3	USL D-3 Pro League	1st, Western	Champion	2nd Round	11,471
2002	3	USL D-3 Pro League	1st, Western	Semifinals	2nd Round	2,235
2003	3	USL Pro Select League	1st, Western	Semifinals	2nd Round	4,227
2004	3	USL Pro Soccer League	1st, Western	Champion	3rd Round	5,652

== Honors ==
- USL Pro Select League (D3 Pro League)
  - Winners (2): 2001, 2004

== Players & staff ==
=== Head coaches ===
- (United States) Chris Agnello 2000-2004
