= Mauricio Segovia =

Chilean footballer (born 1977)

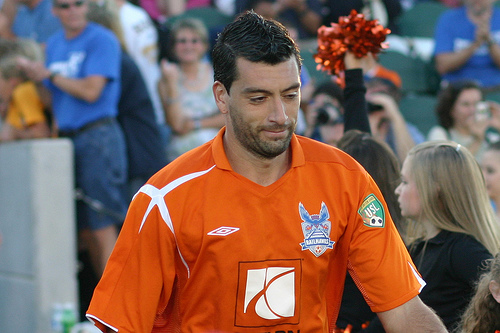
- Segovia with Carolina Railhawks in 2008

Personal information
- Full name: Mauricio Salvador Segovia Piffaut
- Date of birth: 30 December 1977 (age 48)
- Place of birth: Punta Arenas, Chile
- Height: 6 ft 4 in (1.93 m)
- Position: Defender

Youth career
- 1994–1997: Universidad Católica

Senior career*
Years	Team	Apps	(Gls)
1997–2004	Universidad Católica	63	(3)
1999	→ Unión Española (loan)	0	(0)
2000–2001	→ Deportes Antofagasta (loan)	0	(0)
2004–2006	Palestino	40	(0)
2006–2007	Puerto Rico Islanders	43	(0)
2008	Carolina Railhawks	22	(0)
2009	Provincial Osorno	25	(0)
2010	Curicó Unido	13	(1)
2011	Deportes Puerto Montt	24	(2)
2012–2013	San Marcos	45	(3)
2013–2014	Magallanes	11	(0)
Total		286	(9)

Managerial career
- 2014–2015: Magallanes (youth)
- 2015–2018: Curicó Unido (assistant)
- 2018–2019: Deportes La Serena (assistant)
- 2020–2021: Rangers (assistant)
- 2021: Deportes Valdivia (assistant)
- 2021: Deportes Valdivia (caretaker)
- 2023–2026: Rangers (sporting director)
- * Club domestic league appearances and goals

Mauricio Salvador Segovia Piffaut (born 30 December 1977) is a Chilean former footballer who played as a defender. He spent nine seasons in the Chilean First Division and two with the Puerto Rico Islanders of USL-1 before transferring to the RailHawks in 2008.

== Playing career ==
Segovia began his career as a youth player with Universidad Católica in 1994. In 1997, he moved up to the first team and remained with it until he transferred to Unión Española in 1999. He then spent a single season with them and another single season with Antofagasta in 2000–2001.

He was back at Universidad Católica in 2001 and remained until 2004 when he moved to Palestino. In 2006, he left Chile to sign with the Puerto Rico Islanders of the USL First Division. He was the 2006 USL-1 Defender of the Year and a first team All Star. In 2008, he moved to the Carolina RailHawks. In 2009, he moved to Provincial Osorno in the second division from Chile.

== Managerial career ==
Following his retirement as a football player, Segovia began coaching at the Magallanes at the under-17 level from 2014 to 2015. Next. He has worked as an assistant coach for several clubs in Chile. On 12 September 2021, he coached Deportes Valdivia as a caretaker after Luis Marcoleta, the head coach, couldn't make it.

From 2023 to March 2026, Segovia served as sporting director of Rangers de Talca.

== Honours ==
Universidad Católica

- Primera División de Chile: 1997 Apertura, 2002 Apertura

Unión Española

- Primera B: 1999

San Marcos de Arica

- Primera B: 2012
