= Alejandro González (Chilean footballer) =

Chilean footballer (born 1977)

Personal information
- Full name: Alejandro Enrique González Pareja
- Date of birth: 11 October 1977 (age 49)
- Place of birth: Santiago, Chile
- Positions: Midfielder; left-back

Youth career
- Universidad Católica

Senior career*
Years	Team	Apps	(Gls)
1995–1997	Universidad Católica	0	(0)
1998–1999	Jacksonville Cyclones	30	(5)
2000	Unión La Calera	–	(–)
2001	Deportes Puerto Montt	9	(0)
2002–2003	Deportes Melipilla	1	(0)
2004	Palestino	26	(3)
2005	Indiana Invaders	2	(0)
2005–2007	Puerto Rico Islanders	58	(4)
2008	Alajuelense	11	(0)
2009	Unión La Calera	20	(2)
2010–2011	Deportes Puerto Montt	29	(0)
Total		186	(14)
- * Club domestic league appearances and goals

Alejandro Enrique González Pareja (born 11 October 1977) is a Chilean former football player who played as a midfielder for clubs in Chile, the United States, Puerto Rico and Costa Rica.

== Club career ==
A playmaker from Universidad Católica youth system, González took part of tours through Netherlands, France, Spain and the United States. In 1998, he moved to the United States and joined Jacksonville Cyclones in the A-League.

He returned to Chile in 2000 and played for Unión La Calera, winning the Chilean Tercera División.

In his homeland, he also played for Deportes Puerto Montt (2001) and Palestino (2004) in the top division.

From 2005 to 2007, he played for Puerto Rico Islanders in the USL First Division, moving to the left.back position. In addition, he made two appearances for Indiana Invaders in 2005.

In 2008, he played for Costa Rican side Alajuelense.

In the second level of the Chilean football, he played for Deportes Melipilla (2002–03), Unión La Calera (2009) and Deportes Puerto Montt (2010–11).

== Honours ==
Unión La Calera

- Tercera División de Chile: 2000
