= Alon Lubezky =

Israeli footballer

Personal information
- Date of birth: 25 August 1980 (age 46)
- Height: 6 ft 2 in (1.88 m)
- Position: Striker

Youth career
- Maccabi Herzliya
- Maccabi Tel Aviv

College career
Years	Team	Apps	(Gls)
2001–2004	Hartford Hawks	77	(62)

Senior career*
Years	Team	Apps	(Gls)
2005–2006	Charleston Battery	19	(4)

International career
- Israel U17
- * Club domestic league appearances and goals

Alon Lubezky (born 25 August 1980) is an Israeli retired professional footballer who played as a striker.

== Career ==
Lubezky spent his early career with Maccabi Herzliya and Maccabi Tel Aviv.

He then played college soccer at the University of Hartford, winning multiple awards, before turning professional with the Charleston Battery for the 2005 season. He re-signed with the club for the 2006 season.

Lubezky was a youth international for Israel at under-17 level.
