= Mubarike Chisoni =

Zimbabwean footballer (born 1981)

Personal information
- Full name: Mubarike Chisoni
- Date of birth: May 10, 1981 (age 45)
- Place of birth: Bulawayo, Zimbabwe
- Height: 5 ft 8 in (1.73 m)
- Positions: Midfielder; forward

College career
Years	Team	Apps	(Gls)
2001	Lindsey Wilson Blue Raiders	14	(7)
2002–2004	Coastal Carolina Chanticleers		

Senior career*
Years	Team	Apps	(Gls)
2003	Cocoa Expos	13	(13)
2004	Indiana Invaders	16	(13)
2005	Los Angeles Galaxy	11	(0)
2006	Portland Timbers	17	(2)
2007–2010	Indiana Invaders	49	(7)

Managerial career
- 2007–2010: Indiana Invaders
- * Club domestic league appearances and goals as of July 28, 2010

Mubarike "Mamba" Chisoni (born May 10, 1981) is a Zimbabwean footballer who last played for Indiana Invaders in the USL Premier Development League.

== Career ==
=== College and amateur ===
Chisoni left his native Zimbabwe in 2001 to attend college in the United States. He was a prolific goal scorer for Coastal Carolina University, where he tallied 27 goals and 24 assists in his three seasons with the school. Chisoni was named a Third Team All-American following his junior season. During his college years Chisoni also played with the Cocoa Expos and the Indiana Invaders in the USL Premier Development League.

=== Professional ===
Chisoni spent the 2005 season with the Los Angeles Galaxy, where he made 11 appearances, playing mostly as a left winger, using his speed and quickness to attack defenses from the flank. He also played extensively for Galaxy's reserve team in the MLS Reserve Division, finishing tied for fourth in the league with five goals in 2005.

After being released by Galaxy, Chisoni signed for the Portland Timbers in the USL First Division in 2006. He finished his season in Oregon with 2 goals and 3 assists in 17 appearances.

In 2007 Chisoni returned to his first club, Indiana Invaders, to play for their USL Premier Development League team, and as the club's marketing manager and director.
