= Chad Bartlomé =

American soccer player (born 1983)

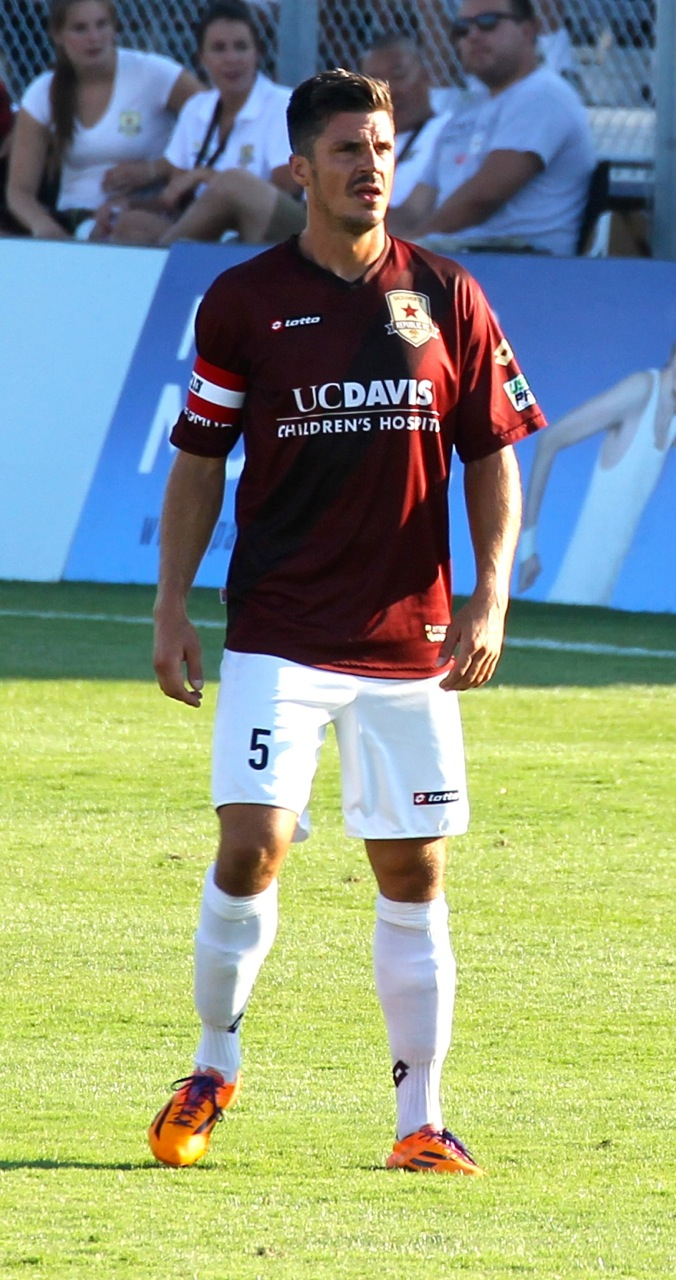

Personal information
- Date of birth: 10 February 1983 (age 43)
- Place of birth: Sacramento, California, U.S.
- Height: 6 ft 3 in (1.91 m)
- Position: Forward

Team information
- Current team: BSC Old Boys
- Number: 5

Youth career
- 2001–2004: Oregon State Beavers

Senior career*
Years	Team	Apps	(Gls)
2006	Portland Timbers	5	(1)
2006–2007	BSC Old Boys	11	(7)
2007–2009	Delémont	42	(18)
2009	FC Wohlen	8	(0)
2009	FC Grenchen	8	(5)
2010–2011	FC Baden	7	(3)
2011	FC Grenchen	19	(5)
2011–2013	BSC Old Boys	40	(20)
2014	Sacramento Republic	19	(1)
2016–2017	BSC Old Boys		
2017–2020	BSC Old Boys II		
- * Club domestic league appearances and goals as of July 1, 2018

Chad Bartlomé (born February 10, 1983, in Sacramento, California) is an American former professional soccer player. He is also the CEO and Head Coach of Bartlomé Soccer Academy in Basel, Switzerland.

== Career ==
Bartlomé played four years of college soccer at Oregon State University between 2001 and 2004, before signing with Portland Timbers in 2005. After a short time with Portland, Bartlomé transferred to Swiss club BSC Old Boys and spent the bulk of his career in Switzerland, playing with SR Delémont, FC Wohlen, FC Grenchen and FC Baden, before heading back to the United States when he signed for USL Pro club Sacramento Republic in March 2014.

=== Coaching ===
Bartlomé coaches and trains students at his Bartlomé Soccer Academy.
