= Chris Agnello =

American soccer coach

Personal information
- Date of birth: 1968 (age 57–58)

College career
Years	Team	Apps	(Gls)
- Warner Pacific College

Managerial career
- 2000–2004: Utah Blitzz
- 2005: Real Salt Lake (assistant)
- 2006: Portland Timbers

Chris Agnello (born 1968) an American soccer coach who co-founded and coached the Utah Blitzz of the USL Second Division in 2000.

== Career ==
Agnello was the 1985 Gatorade Utah Player of the Year. He attended Warner Pacific College, playing on the men's soccer team. He then earned his master's degree in Exercise Sport Science from the University of Utah in 1998. In 2012 he completed his master's in Business Administration from the University of Utah. Over the years, he coached several youth teams before helping found the Utah Blitzz in 2000. Agnello coached the Blitzz from 2000 to 2004. He was the 2002 Pro League Coach of the Year. In 2001 and 2004 he guided the Utah Blitzz to winning the USL Pro League Championship. Coach Angello has coached in the highest American ranks in the Timbers In 2005, he spent one season as an assistant coach with Real Salt Lake in Major League Soccer. In December 2005, he was as Coach and General Manager of the Portland Timbers of the USL First Division.
