= Scot Thompson =

American soccer player (born 1981)

Personal information
- Full name: Scot Thompson
- Date of birth: February 11, 1981 (age 45)
- Place of birth: New York, New York, United States
- Height: 6 ft 0 in (1.83 m)
- Position: Defender

College career
Years	Team	Apps	(Gls)
1999–2002	UCLA Bruins		

Senior career*
Years	Team	Apps	(Gls)
2003–2004	Los Angeles Galaxy	1	(0)
2004	→ Portland Timbers (loan)	13	(0)
2005–2010	Portland Timbers	143	(9)
2011	Portland Timbers U23s	2	(0)

International career
2002–2003	United States U23	3	(0)

Managerial career
- 2014: Portland Thorns (asst.)
- * Club domestic league appearances and goals as of May 25, 2011

Scot Thompson (born February 11, 1981, in New York, New York) is an American soccer player.

On January 20, 2010, he was ranked 21st in the USL First Division Top 25 of the Decade, which announced a list of the best and most influential players of the previous decade. He was the official community ambassador for the Portland Timbers and involved in social media connecting with fans, both Twitter and Facebook, for the Timbers.

== Career ==
=== Youth and college ===
Thompson grew up in Rancho Santa Margarita, California. He was a standout defender at Trabuco Hills High School from 1995 to 1999, where he was a four-year Varsity starter, and earned all South Coast League 1st Team Honors for three years. During this time, Thompson was invited to train with the US National Under-19 Squad. In Thompson's senior year, Trabuco Hills earned a share of the South Coast League title and was knocked out of the quarter-finals of the CIF playoffs.

Thompson played college soccer at UCLA from 1999 to 2002, helping lead the Bruins to a national championship in 2002. He finished his career at UCLA with 68 starts and was named to the first-team All-Pac-10 as a senior.

=== Professional ===
Thompson was selected in the second round (16th overall) in the 2003 MLS SuperDraft by Los Angeles Galaxy. However, he tore his ACL in the preseason and missed the entire 2003 season. Returning in 2004, Thompson was loaned mid-season to the Portland Timbers of the A-League. Thompson started 13 games for the Timbers, registering two assists and helping lead the team to the A-League's best regular-season record. When the Timbers were eliminated from the playoffs, Thompson returned to the Galaxy; however, he only made one appearance, playing a single minute.

Thompson was released at the end of the season, then re-signed with the Timbers.

Thompson became the Timbers' all-time leader in minutes on July 23, 2009. On February 26, 2010, Portland announced the re-signing of Thompson to a new contract for the 2010 season.

=== Coaching ===
On March 7, 2014, Portland Thorns FC announced Thompson had been hired as an assistant coach for the 2014–2015 season.

== Honors ==
=== Portland Timbers ===
- USL First Division Commissioner's Cup (1): 2009
