= Sam Reynolds (soccer) =

American soccer player (born 1981)

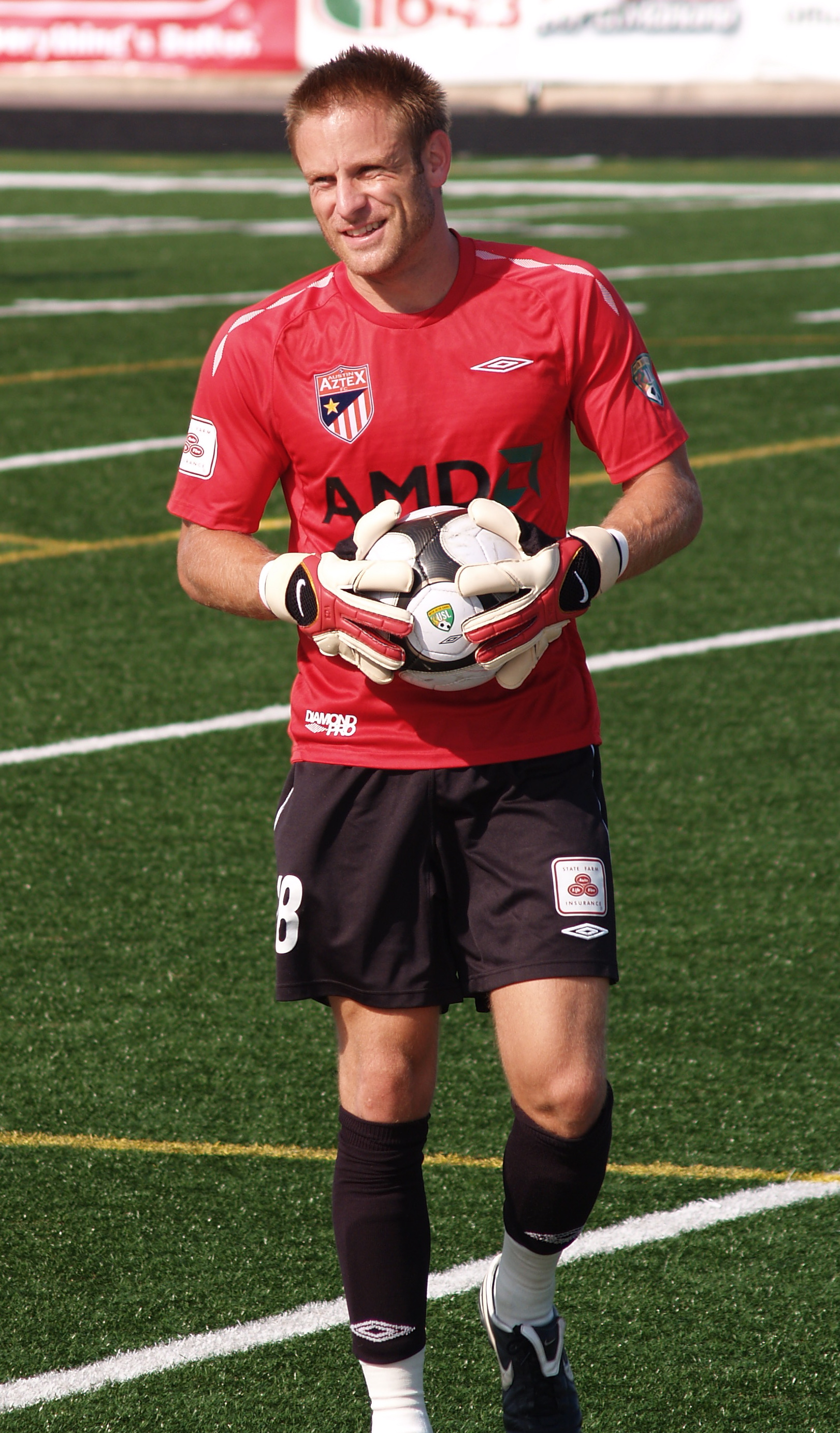

Personal information
- Full name: Sam Reynolds
- Date of birth: December 13, 1981 (age 44)
- Place of birth: Fortuna, California, U.S.
- Height: 6 ft 1 in (1.85 m)
- Position: Goalkeeper

Youth career
- 2001–2004: Fullerton Titans

Senior career*
Years	Team	Apps	(Gls)
2005	Portland Timbers	0	(0)
2006–2007	MLS Pool	–	(–)
2006	→ Chivas USA (loan)	0	(0)
2007	→ Toronto FC (loan)	2	(0)
2008	Miami FC	3	(0)
2009	Austin Aztex	12	(0)

Managerial career
- 2010–2011: Cal State Fullerton Titans (assistant)
- * Club domestic league appearances and goals

Sam Reynolds (born December 13, 1981) is an American former professional soccer player, now a player liaison for PROficient Agency, representing professional soccer players, primarily in the United States and Europe.

== Career ==
=== Youth and high school ===
Reynolds attended Davis Senior High School, where he played for the Ashley Yudin–coached Blue Devils who were undefeated for two seasons and won two CIF Section championships. He graduated in 2000. Reynolds played his youth soccer for the Davis Devils and in 1999–2000 for the River City Rush, a CYSL team coached by Marcos Mercado that won the California State Cup Championship (U-18) in 2000.

=== College and amateur ===
Reynolds attended Cal State Fullerton, where he played four seasons of NCAA Division I soccer under head coach Al Mistri. He red-shirted his freshman year, then played from 2001 to 2004 a total of 59 games, starting 57, accumulating 12 shutouts and finishing with a 1.51 goals against average. Reynolds also played for the United States Adult Soccer Association California-South Region IV team that won the 2004 George F. Donnelly Cup, the US national amateur championship. Reynolds was named MVP of the tournament.

=== Professional ===
On April 2, 2005, Reynolds signed with the Portland Timbers of the USL First Division, but saw no regular-season game time. In April 2006, Reynolds signed with Major League Soccer as the League Pool Goalkeeper for the 2006 season. He spent most of the season as a reserve keeper with Chivas USA, under head coach Bob Bradley and goalkeeper coach Zak Abdel, and played in MLS reserve matches, but never made a first team start.

He re-signed as a pool goalkeeper with MLS in 2007, training with Chivas USA, and gained his MLS debut with Toronto FC on July 1, 2007, in a 1–1 draw with the Kansas City Wizards. Three days later he started for Toronto again and earned a 2–1 win over Real Salt Lake, but was injured in the 85th minute. In April 2008, Reynolds signed to a contract with Miami FC of USL First Division. He made three starting appearances in 2008, earning a 1–1 draw on the road against the Vancouver Whitecaps and two shutout victories against the Rochester Rhinos and Atlanta Silverbacks to close out the Miami season with a .33 goals against average.

He joined Austin Aztex for the 2009 season. He made 12 appearances, but was released at the end of the year.

In 2010, he returned to Cal State Fullerton to coach goalkeepers for both the men's and women's teams for two seasons.

In 2012, he joined PROficient Agency, a Portland-based firm started by Reynolds' former Portland Timbers and CSU Fullerton teammate Shaun Higgins.

=== International ===
Reynolds has played in several international exhibitions, including in July 2005 with Portland Timbers in a friendly against Sunderland of the English Premier League; friendly matches with Chivas USA against Mexican Primera A sides Necaxa in October 2006 in Aguascalientes, Mexico, and Chivas Guadalajara at Estadio Jalisco in November 2007; and on August 2, 2008, for Miami FC in a friendly match against the Haiti national football team in Miami.

In September 2008 Reynolds was invited to the United States men's national soccer team training camp in Miami for three days of training as the team prepared for their World Cup qualifier match against Cuba.

In February 2012 Reynolds played goalkeeper for the United States Men's National Beach Soccer Team coached by Eddie Soto at the Cancun Cup.
