= Ross H. Spencer =

American novelist

Ross H. Spencer (1921–1998) was a mystery author, best known for his series of comic novels that astutely satirized the private eye genre.

== Early life ==
Spencer was born in Hughart, West Virginia, raised in Youngstown, Ohio, and moved back to Youngstown before he died. Spencer served with the 37th Infantry Division during World War II, during the Battle of New Georgia, on the USS Bougainville (CVE-100), and in the Philippines, for which he was awarded a Bronze Star. After the war, he lived for a while in Chicago where he was an avid fan of the Chicago Cubs. During the "Korean Emergency," he reenlisted in the military, this time in the Air Force.

== Writing career ==
Spencer did not begin writing until after he had a heart attack in his fifties, after which he read a couple of mystery novels which he found amusing. He taught himself to write his special brand of funny mystery novels, beginning with The Dada Caper (1978). David Merrick optioned five of his novels for Broadway, though they never saw the stage. The Chance Purdue series spoofed the private eye genre, and was written with one sentence paragraphs and minimal punctuation, with chapters prefaced by quotes from the fictional pundit Monroe D. Underwood.

Spencer was the author of fourteen novels starring hard-drinking Chicago private eye protagonists, including Lacey Lockington, Chance Purdue, Buzz Deckard, Luke Lassiter and Birch Kirby. One New York Times review described his writing as "including rat-tat-tat writing in which paragraphs are seldom more than one sentence...[and] the hero is a private eye who is always tailing the wrong people and hitting the wrong guys. Wild, shrewd mad and unexpectedly funny." and "Ross H. Spencer has, up until now, been published only in paperback books that demonstrated a wacky humor and an equally wacky writing style. In The Dada Caper (1978) and The Reggis Arms Caper (1979), Mr. Spencer got his style down mostly to one-sentence paragraphs. The prose hurtled along. Neither book was serious, but Mr. Spencer had fun spoofing the crime genre, and he did so with unusual expertise."

Close friend, Ross Spencer was a great writer and fiend. A group of writers met at his home on Youngstown's west side. He helped me with my writing and made great suggestions to improve it. That basement, at 551 N. Dunlop Avenue, was a favorite spot for the writer gang, one of whom was Jim Fisher who wrote "The Lindbergh Case." He typed all that writing on a word presser with two fingers with a Dutch Master cigar clenched between his teeth. I'd ask for a cigar box for some storage, and he's say, about ten? He gave me many autographed copies of his books, and his knowledge of history, music and many subjects was extensive. He graduated from Chaney High school in Youngstown and never attended college. Working on top of a blast furnace in Youngstown, in the middle of the night, atop the furnace, with a helper, making sure the hopper to feed the furnace was emptied, he threw the shovel over the side and told to his helper - That's it - I quit - I'm going back to Chicago. I kept in touch with his dear wife and daughter for years from Oklahoma where I moved in 1998. Don P. Simons - Yukon, OK

== Bibliography ==
=== Novels ===
- Echoes of Zero. New York: St Martin's, 1981. ISBN 0-312-22552-0
- The Missing Bishop. New York: Warner, 1985. ISBN 0-445-40533-3
- Monastery Nightmare. New York: Warner, 1986. ISBN 0-445-40567-8
- Kirby's Last Circus. New York: Donald I. Fine, 1987.
- Death Wore Gloves. Donald I. Fine, 1988.

The Chance Purdue Series

- The Dada Caper. New York: Avon, 1978. ISBN 0-380-01839-X
- The Reggis Arms Caper. New York: Avon, 1979. ISBN 0-380-47092-6
- The Abu Wahab Caper. New York: Avon, 1980. ISBN 0-380-76356-7
- The Stranger City Caper. New York: Avon, 1980. ISBN 0-380-75036-8
- The Radish River Caper. New York: Avon, 1981. ISBN 0-380-77248-5
- The Compleat Chance Purdue. Alexander, NC: Alexander Books. 1998. ISBN 1-57090-045-0

Lacy Lockington Series

- The Fifth Script. New York: Donald I. Fine, 1989.
- The Devereaux File. New York: Donald I. Fine, 1990. ISBN 0-7927-0894-6
- The Fedorovich File. New York: Donald I. Fine, 1991. (1991) ISBN 1-55611-249-1

== See also ==
- List of mystery writers
