= Edwin Miranda =

Salvadoran footballer (born 1981)

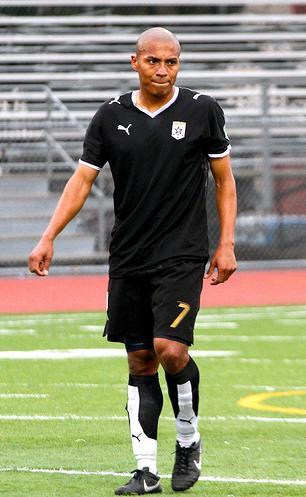
- Miranda with the Hollywood United Hitmen in 2010

Personal information
- Full name: Edwin Vladimir Miranda
- Date of birth: 28 January 1981 (age 45)
- Place of birth: Zacatecoluca, El Salvador
- Height: 6 ft 0 in (1.83 m)
- Position: Midfielder

Youth career
- 1999–2002: Northridge Matadors

Senior career*
Years	Team	Apps	(Gls)
2004–2005	Portland Timbers	45	(5)
2006–2008	Puerto Rico Islanders	75	(3)
2009	Miami FC	25	(0)
2010	Hollywood United Hitmen	16	(2)
2010	Puerto Rico Islanders	4	(0)
2011	Los Angeles Blues	18	(1)
2012	Los Angeles Misioneros	8	(1)
2012–2014	FAS		

International career
2009	El Salvador	3	(0)
- * Club domestic league appearances and goals

Edwin Vladimir Miranda (born 28 January 1981) is a Salvadoran former professional footballer who played as a midfielder.

== Early life ==
Miranda grew up in Los Angeles, California, and played four years of college soccer at Cal State-Northridge, where he was twice named Big West Conference Defender of the Year.

== Club career ==
Miranda was drafted in the sixth round (54th overall) by Dallas Burn in the 2004 MLS SuperDraft. Miranda was unable work his way into the Dallas first team squad, and transferred to the Portland Timbers of the USL First Division for the 2004 season. After two seasons with the Timbers, Miranda transferred to the Puerto Rico Islanders.

In early 2009 it was announced that the Islanders and Miranda had decided to mutually part ways, as they could not come to an agreement as to the players salary. On 12 April 2009, Miranda signed a one-year contract with USL First Division team Miami FC, and played 25 games before being released at the end of the season.

He signed for the Hollywood United Hitmen of the USL Premier Development League in 2010, and played in 16 games for the team, helping them to the 2010 PDL playoffs. Following the conclusion of the 2010 PDL season Miranda returned to the Puerto Rico Islanders, playing four regular season games for Tropa Naranja towards the end of their successful championship-winning USSF D-2 Pro League campaign.

Miranda signed with USL Pro club Los Angeles Blues on 7 April 2011. He scored one goal in 18 games for the Blues, but was released by the team following the conclusion of the 2011 USL Pro season, and subsequently signed to play for the Los Angeles Misioneros in the USL Premier Development League in 2012. He made his debut for his new club on 22 April, a 4–1 opening-day loss to Fresno Fuego.

== International career ==
Miranda received his first called up to the El Salvador national team in December 2008. He received his first cap on 24 January 2009, in a UNCAF Nations Cup match against Belize when he came on as a late substitute for Salvador Coreas.

== Honours ==
Puerto Rico Islanders

- USSF Division 2 Pro League: 2010
- USL First Division Commissioner's Cup: 2008
