= Bayard Elfvin =

American soccer player (born 1981)

Personal information
- Full name: Bayard Thor Elfvin
- Date of birth: February 1, 1981 (age 45)
- Place of birth: Cleveland Heights, Ohio, U.S.
- Height: 6 ft 1 in (1.85 m)
- Position: Goalkeeper

College career
Years	Team	Apps	(Gls)
1999–2003	Ashland Eagles		

Senior career*
Years	Team	Apps	(Gls)
2004	Portland Timbers	4	(0)
2004–05	Cleveland Force (indoor)	7	(0)
2005	Virginia Beach Mariners	4	(0)
2005–06	St. Louis Steamers (indoor)	10	(0)
2006–07	California Cougars (indoor)	9	(0)
2006–07	Portland Timbers	8	(0)
2007–08	New Jersey Ironmen (indoor)	7	(0)
2009	Chicago Storm (indoor)		

International career
2005–2009	U.S. Beach Soccer		

Managerial career
- Virginia Wesleyan College (assistant)
- DePaul Blue Demons (assistant)
- 2011–: Northwestern Wildcats (assistant)
- * Club domestic league appearances and goals

Bayard Elfvin (born February 1, 1981) is an American retired soccer goalkeeper who is an assistant coach with the Northwestern University women' soccer team. Elfvin played professionally in the USL First Division and the second Major Indoor Soccer League. He was a member of the United States national beach soccer team which competed at both the 2006 and 2007 FIFA Beach Soccer World Cups.

== Player ==
=== College ===
Elfvin led Div. II Ashland University to its first NCAA tournament appearance in 2001. A four-year starter, Elfvin was a two-time All-Great Lakes Intercollegiate Athletic Conference (GLIAC) selection for the Eagles. He ended his stay as the school's career leader in shutouts (14) and goals-against-average (1.23). He had a career record of 31–12–2. In his final season at Ashland, Elfvin posted a record of 7–1–2 and allowed just eight goals, the fewest in school history. He also notched four shutouts while recording a goals-against-average of 0.86 and 40 saves.

=== Professional ===
==== Outdoor ====
In 2004, Elfvin began his professional career when he signed with the Portland Timbers of the USL First Division. He made only two appearances for the Timbers his rookie season, posting two shutouts. In 2005, he moved to the Virginia Beach Mariners, but found himself back in Portland for the 2006 and 2007 seasons. In 2006, he played a career-high 502 minutes in six matches and recorded shutouts in half of his appearances. Elfvin was a two-time USL First Division Team of the Week selection in Week 9 and Week 18. In 2007, Elfvin was limited to just two starts and 135 minutes, posting a 1.33 goals against average.

==== Indoor ====
In 2004, Elfvin signed with the Cleveland Force of Major Indoor Soccer League. He appeared in six games for the Force in 2004–05, finishing with a 3–2 record. He faced 93 shots and recorded 63 saves for a 6.06 goals against average. The Force folded at the end of the season and the St. Louis Steamers selected Elfvin in the 2005 MISL Dispersal Draft. He finished the 2005–06 season with a 3–3 win-loss record and a 3.89 goals against average. In 2006, he moved to the California Cougars, logging 497 minutes and stopping 87 of the 145 shots he faced for a .600 save percentage. The Cougars collapsed at the end of the season and Elfvin found himself selected by the New Jersey Ironmen in the 2007 Dispersal Draft. In May 2009, the Chicago Storm of the Xtreme Soccer League signed Elfvin to replace injured goalkeeper Jeff Richey.

=== National team ===
Elfvin has been part of the U.S. Beach Soccer Team at both the World Cups 2006, 2007.

== Coach ==
In 2011, Elfvin became an assistant coach with the Northwestern University women's soccer team.
