= Nate Craft =

American soccer player

Personal information
- Date of birth: March 28, 1977 (age 49)
- Place of birth: Royal Oak, Michigan, United States
- Height: 5 ft 7 in (1.70 m)
- Position: Defender

Team information
- Current team: Michigan Bucks
- Number: 20

Senior career*
Years	Team	Apps	(Gls)
2003–2005	Michigan Bucks	31	(1)
2006–2008	Rochester Rhinos	44	(0)
2006–2008	Detroit Ignition (indoor)	65	(3)
2009–	Michigan Bucks	1	(0)
- * Club domestic league appearances and goals as of December 13, 2009

Nate Craft (born March 28, 1977, in Royal Oak, Michigan) is a U.S. soccer defender with the Michigan Bucks in the USL Premier Development League

Craft spent several years playing recreational soccer while working as a factory manager. In 2003, he joined the Michigan Bucks of the Premier Development League. His excellent play brought him to the attention of the Rochester Rhinos of the USL First Division. He signed with the Rhinos in the spring of 2006 and has remained with the team since then. In the fall of 2006, he joined the Detroit Ignition of the Major Indoor Soccer League. He was named to the 2006-2007 All Rookie Team, helping lead the Ignition to the MISL Championship match where they fell to the Philadelphia KiXX.

In 2009, Craft again returned to play for the Michigan Bucks.
