= 2008 U.S. Open Cup =

2008 Lamar Hunt U.S. Open Cup
Tournament details
- Country: United States

Final positions
- Champions: D.C. United (2nd title)
- Runners-up: Charleston Battery
- 2009–10 CONCACAF Champions League: D.C. United

Tournament statistics
- Top goal scorer(s): Sébastien Le Toux (5 goals)

The 2008 Lamar Hunt U.S. Open Cup was the 95th edition of the USSF's annual national soccer championship, running from June through early September.

D.C. United won the final 2–1 over the Charleston Battery on September 3 at RFK Stadium in Washington, D.C., on a pair of goals from Brazilians Luciano Emilio and Fred. It was United's second Open Cup title.

The Battery were the first USL club in the final since the Rochester Rhinos won the cup in 1999.

The Cup schedule was shortened in 2008, ending in September instead of October, so as to avoid interfering with Major League Soccer's end-of-season playoff drive in the fall and the new CONCACAF Champions League.

The 13 US-based MLS clubs participated, although only 8 competed in the main tournament (Chicago Fire, Chivas USA, D.C. United, FC Dallas, Houston Dynamo, Kansas City Wizards, New England Revolution, New York Red Bulls). Qualifying was similar to the 2007 tournament, with the top 3 teams from each conference in 2007 qualifying automatically, and the other 7 playing off during the early part of the 2008 season for the remaining 2 spots.

United Soccer Leagues had a separate qualifying plan for each tier. The 8 US-based USL-1 teams qualified automatically (Puerto Rico has its own federation, thus the Puerto Rico Islanders are not eligible to participate in the Open Cup). 8 of the 9 US-based USL-2 teams qualified. The defending USL-2 playoff champions, the Harrisburg City Islanders, and the 2007 regular-season champion Richmond Kickers qualified automatically. The remaining 7 teams played off for 6 spots, based on early regular season results. The PDL used selected early regular-season games for qualification. The top two teams in the Eastern and Central conferences, and the top teams in the Mid-South, Southeast, Northwest, and Southwest divisions qualified.

The tournament was rounded out by 8 amateur USASA clubs (Adria, Arizona Sahuaros, Boston Olympiakos, Clearwater Galactics, Eagles, Hollywood United, New Stars, New York Pancyprian-Freedoms). USASA qualifying began in the fall of 2007. Clubs from the NPSL enter the Cup through USASA qualifying.

== Matchdays ==
| Date | Round | Notes |
|---|---|---|
| June 10 | First | 32 USL and USASA clubs enter |
| June 24 | Second | |
| July 1 | Third | 8 MLS clubs enter |
| July 8 | Quarterfinals | |
| Aug. 12 | Semifinals | |
| September 3 | Final | |

== Participating teams ==
The tournament consists of 40 teams, according to the following distribution:

| Classification | Number of Teams |
|---|---|
| Major League Soccer | 8 |
| United Soccer Leagues First Division | 8 |
| United Soccer Leagues Second Division | 8 |
| Amateur | 16* |

*Includes 8 USL Premier Development League teams and 8 USASA regional qualifiers

== Qualified Clubs ==
=== Tier 1: Major League Soccer (MLS) ===
- Chicago Fire
- Chivas USA
- D.C. United
- FC Dallas
- Houston Dynamo
- Kansas City Wizards
- New England Revolution
- New York Red Bulls

=== Tiers 2 – 4: United Soccer Leagues (USL) ===
Tier 2 – First Division (USL-1)

- Atlanta Silverbacks
- Carolina RailHawks
- Charleston Battery
- Miami FC
- Minnesota Thunder
- Portland Timbers
- Rochester Rhinos
- Seattle Sounders

Tier 3 – Second Division (USL-2)

- Charlotte Eagles
- Cleveland City Stars
- Crystal Palace Baltimore
- Harrisburg City Islanders
- Pittsburgh Riverhounds
- Real Maryland Monarchs
- Richmond Kickers
- Western Mass Pioneers

Tier 4 – Premier Development League (PDL)

- Austin Aztex U23
- Bradenton Academics
- Brooklyn Knights
- Fredericksburg Gunners
- Los Angeles Legends
- Michigan Bucks
- St. Louis Lions
- Yakima Reds

=== Tier 5: United States Adult Soccer Association (USASA) ===
- RWB Adria
- Arizona Sahuaros
- Boston Olympiakos
- Clearwater Galactics
- A.A.C. Eagles
- Hollywood United
- New Stars
- New York Pancyprian-Freedoms

== Open Cup bracket ==
Second Round winners advance to play one of 8 MLS clubs in 16-team knockout tournament
Home teams listed on top of bracket

First round June 10
USL-2 | (Massachusetts) Western Mass Pioneers | 2
USASA | (Massachusetts) Boston Olympiakos | 0
USL-2 | (Virginia) Richmond Kickers | 3
PDL | (Virginia) Fredericksburg Gunners | 0

Second round June 24
USL-2 | (Massachusetts) Western Mass Pioneers | 1
USL-2 | (Virginia) Richmond Kickers | 2

First round June 10
USL-2 | (Pennsylvania) Harrisburg City Islanders | 5
PDL | (Washington (state)) Yakima Reds | 1
PDL | (California) Los Angeles Legends | 1
USL-2 | (Maryland) Crystal Palace Baltimore | 2

Second round June 24
USL-2 | (Pennsylvania) Harrisburg City Islanders | 2 (1)
USL-2 | (Maryland) Crystal Palace Baltimore (p) | 2 (3)

First round June 10
USL-1 | (New York (state)) Rochester Rhinos (aet) | 2
USASA | (Illinois) RWB Adria | 1
USASA | (Illinois) A.A.C. Eagles | 0
USL-2 | (Pennsylvania) Pittsburgh Riverhounds | 4

Second round June 24
USL-1 | (New York (state)) Rochester Rhinos | 3
USL-2 | (Pennsylvania) Pittsburgh Riverhounds | 0

First round June 10
USL-1 | Minnesota Thunder | 4
PDL | (Missouri) St. Louis Lions | 1
PDL | Michigan Bucks | 1
USL-2 | (Ohio) Cleveland City Stars | 2

Second round June 24
USL-1 | Minnesota Thunder | 0
USL-2 | (Ohio) Cleveland City Stars (aet) | 2

First round June 10
USL-1 | (Florida) Miami FC | 4
PDL | (Florida) Bradenton Academics | 2
PDL | (Texas) Austin Aztex U23 | 2 (4)
USL-1 | (Georgia (U.S. state)) Atlanta Silverbacks (p) | 2 (5)

Second round June 24
USL-1 | (Florida) Miami FC | 1
USL-1 | (Georgia (U.S. state)) Atlanta Silverbacks | 0

First round June 10
USL-1 | (South Carolina) Charleston Battery | 3
USASA | (Texas) New Stars | 0
USL-2 | (North Carolina) Charlotte Eagles | 5
USASA | (Florida) Clearwater Galactics | 2

Second round June 24
USL-1 | (South Carolina) Charleston Battery | 2
USL-2 | (North Carolina) Charlotte Eagles | 1

First round June 10
USASA | Arizona Sahuaros | 0
USL-1 | (Washington (state)) Seattle Sounders (aet) | 1
USL-1 | (Oregon) Portland Timbers | 2
USASA | (California) Hollywood United | 3

Second round June 24
USL-1 | (Washington (state)) Seattle Sounders | 6
USASA | (California) Hollywood United | 0

First round June 10/13
USL-1 | (North Carolina) Carolina RailHawks | 1
PDL | (New York (state)) Brooklyn Knights | 0
USL-2 | Real Maryland Monarchs (aet) | 3
USASA | (New York (state)) New York Pancyprian-Freedoms | 2

Second round June 24
USL-1 | (North Carolina) Carolina RailHawks | 1
USL-2 | Real Maryland Monarchs | 0

Third round July 1
MLS | (Washington, D.C.) D.C. United | 2
USL-1 | (New York (state)) Rochester Rhinos | 0
MLS | (Illinois) Chicago Fire | 4
USL-2 | (Ohio) Cleveland City Stars | 1
MLS | (Massachusetts) New England Revolution | 3
USL-2 | (Virginia) Richmond Kickers | 0
USL-2 | (Maryland) Crystal Palace Baltimore | 2
MLS | (New Jersey) New York Red Bulls | 0
MLS | (Texas) FC Dallas | 2
USL-1 | (Florida) Miami FC | 1
USL-1 | (South Carolina) Charleston Battery (p) | 1 (4)
MLS | (Texas) Houston Dynamo | 1 (3)
USL-1 | (Washington (state)) Seattle Sounders | 2
MLS | (California) Chivas USA | 0
USL-1 | (North Carolina) Carolina RailHawks | 2
MLS | Kansas City Wizards (aet) | 4

Quarterfinals; July 8
MLS | D.C. United (aet) | 2
MLS | Chicago Fire | 1
MLS | New England Revolution (p) | 1 (5)
USL-2 | Crystal Palace Baltimore | 1 (3)
MLS | FC Dallas | 1
USL-1 | Charleston Battery | 3
USL-1 | Seattle Sounders (p) | 0 (6)
MLS | Kansas City Wizards | 0 (5)

Semifinals; August 12
MLS | D.C. United | 3
MLS | New England Revolution | 1
USL-1 | Charleston Battery (p) | 1 (4)
USL-1 | Seattle Sounders | 1 (3)

Final; September 3
MLS | D.C. United | 2
USL-1 | Charleston Battery | 1

== Schedule ==
Note: Scorelines use the standard U.S. convention of placing the home team on the right-hand side of box scores.

=== First round ===
| June 10, 2008 | (Florida) Clearwater Galactics (USASA) | 2–5 | (North Carolina) Charlotte Eagles (USL-2) | Charlotte, North Carolina |
| 7:00 ET | Cormona 42'; Diaz 48'; Garcia (yellow card) 61'; Restrepo (yellow card) 82' | Report (Charlotte); Report (USL) | Ssejjemba 34' 76'; Swinehart 54' (pen.), 66'; Herrara 73' | Stadium: Charlotte Christian School; Referee: Daniel Burak |

| June 10, 2008 | (Washington (state)) Yakima Reds (PDL) | 1–5 | (Pennsylvania) Harrisburg City Islanders (USL-2) | Harrisburg, Pennsylvania |
| 7:00 ET | Valencia (yellow card) 60'; Rojas 86' | Report (Yakima); Report (Harrisburg) | Schofield 1'; Hacker 16' (o.g.); Wiesner; Barbosa 45+'; Bloes 57' | Stadium: Skyline Sports Complex; Referee: Stanford Nagle |

| June 10, 2008 | (New York (state)) Brooklyn Knights (PDL) | 0–1 | (North Carolina) Carolina RailHawks (USL-1) | Cary, North Carolina |
| 7:30 ET | Smith (yellow card) 31'; Niebles (yellow card) 76' | Report (Carolina); Report (USL) | Low 86' | Stadium: WakeMed Soccer Park; Referee: Abbas Piran |

| June 10, 2008 | (Massachusetts) Boston Olympiakos (USASA) | 0–2 | (Massachusetts) Western Mass Pioneers (USL-2) | Ludlow, Massachusetts |
| 7:30 ET | Walker (yellow card) 36' | Report (Western Mass) | Neil Krause 32' (yellow card) 45'; Augustine (yellow card) 35'; Deren 66' | Stadium: Lusitano Stadium; Referee: Giany Barbat |

| June 10, 2008 | (Pennsylvania) Pittsburgh Riverhounds (USL-2) | 4–0 | (Illinois) Eagles (USASA) | Lisle, Illinois |
| 7:30 ET | Salsi; Browne; Jerome; MacKenzie | Report (Pittsburgh) | | Stadium: Benedictine University; Referee: Victor Herrera |

| June 10, 2008 | (Ohio) Cleveland City Stars (USL-2) | 2–1 | Michigan Bucks (PDL) | Pontiac, Michigan |
| 7:30 ET | Franks 23'; Hlavaty 34' | Report (Michigan); Report (USL) | Shipalane 4' | Stadium: Ultimate Soccer Arena; Referee: Mike Sharrah |

| June 10, 2008 | (Illinois) Adria (USASA) | 1–2 | (New York (state)) Rochester Rhinos (USL-1) | Rochester, New York |
| 7:30 ET | Mesanovic (yellow card) 65'; Dugena (yellow card) 78'; Morad 86' | Report (Rochester); Report (USL) | Menyongar (yellow card) 55'; Fitzpatrick 72' (pen.) (yellow card) 116'; Diallo 96' | Stadium: PAETEC Park; Attendance: 1,152; Referee: Chris Penso |

| June 10, 2008 | (Texas) New Stars (USASA) | 0–3 | (South Carolina) Charleston Battery (USL-1) | Charleston, South Carolina |
| 7:30 ET | | Report (Charleston); Report (USL) | Spicer 23' 30' 43'; Alonso (yellow card) 55' | Stadium: Blackbaud Stadium; Referee: Alan Schechtman |

| June 10, 2008 | (Virginia) Fredericksburg Gunners (PDL) | 0–3 | (Virginia) Richmond Kickers (USL-2) | Richmond, Virginia |
| 8:00 ET | Bownes (yellow card) 23' | Report (Fredericksburg); Report (Richmond); Report (USL) | Paschalis 11'; Nyazamba 20'; Bulow 24' (pen.) | Stadium: Sports Backers Stadium; Attendance: 592; Referee: Shaun Papperman |

| June 10, 2008 | (Missouri) St. Louis Lions (PDL) | 1–4 | Minnesota Thunder (USL-1) | Blaine, Minnesota |
| 8:00 ET | Gelvin (yellow card) 45'; Merrick (yellow card) 45'; Heinemann (yellow card) 70' (goal) 79' | Report (Minnesota) | Tarley 44' 80'; Sánchez 57'; Paye 89' | Stadium: National Sports Center; Attendance: 483; Referee: Fotis Bazakos |

| June 10, 2008 | (Florida) Bradenton Academics (PDL) | 2–4 | (Florida) Miami FC (USL-1) | Miami, Florida |
| 8:00 ET | Boggs; Ampaipitakwong (yellow card) 36'; Ibegha (yellow card) 41'; Gutierrez 49' (o.g.); McFarland (yellow card) 56' | Report (USL) | Cameron 25'; Cauê (yellow card) 48'; John (yellow card) 49'; Nunes 58' (yellow card) 78'; Afonso 59' 90+'; Cristiano (red card) 69' | Stadium: Tropical Park Stadium; Referee: Reggie Rutty |

| June 10, 2008 | (Georgia (U.S. state)) Atlanta Silverbacks (USL-1) | 2–2 (a.e.t.) (5–4 p) | (Texas) Austin Aztex U23 (PDL) | Round Rock, Texas |
| 8:30 ET | Bolton (yellow card) 23'; Bobo (yellow card) 38'; Kandji 81'; Mahaffey (red card) 99'; Hayes 113' (pen.) | Report (Austin); Report (USL) | Lewis (yellow card) 40'; Watson 45+' (yellow card) 75'; Guadarrama 101'; Vega (yellow card) 105'; Gallardo (yellow card) 113'; Vicens (yellow card) 116' | Stadium: Dragon Stadium; Referee: Andrew Gage |
| | Penalties |
| | Bolton (penalty scored); Camp (penalty scored); Kandji (penalty scored); McLaughlin (penalty scored); Hayes (penalty scored) | | (penalty scored) da Luz; (penalty missed) Papandrea; (penalty scored) Guadarrama; (penalty scored) Watson; (penalty scored) Alcala |

| June 10, 2008 | (California) Hollywood United F.C. (USASA) | 3–2 | (Oregon) Portland Timbers (USL-1) | Portland, Oregon |
| 10:00 ET | Dunseth (yellow card) 26'; Taylor 45+' (pen.), 58' (pen.); Droze (yellow card) 50'; Alexander 90' | Report (Portland); Report (USL) | Brown 32' (yellow card) 45'; Little (yellow card) 36'; Oka 51' (yellow card) 90'; Thompson (yellow card) 65'; Guante (yellow card) 73' | Stadium: PGE Park; Attendance: 3,089; Referee: Andres Pfefferkorn |

| June 10, 2008 | (Washington (state)) Seattle Sounders (USL-1) | 1–0 (a.e.t.) | Arizona Sahuaros (USASA) | Phoenix, Arizona |
| 10:30 ET | Treschuk 118' | Report (Seattle); Report (Arizona); Report (USL) | Sumter (yellow card) 80' | Stadium: Grand Canyon University; Attendance: 3,559; Referee: Richard Heron |

| June 10, 2008 | (Maryland) Crystal Palace Baltimore (USL-2) | 2–1 | (California) Los Angeles Legends (PDL) | Azusa, California |
| 10:30 ET | Healey 43' 88' | Report (Los Angeles); Report (USL) | Pacheco (yellow card) 44'; Schunk (red card) 59'; Gallaugher 62' | Stadium: Cougar Stadium; Referee: Miguel Chicas |

| June 13, 2008 | (New York (state)) NY Pancyprian-Freedoms (USASA) | 2–3 (a.e.t.) | Real Maryland Monarchs (USL-2) | Boyds, Maryland |
| 8:00 ET | Dos Santos 22'; Damiani (yellow card) 60' (goal) 69'; Halkidis (yellow card) 82' (yellow card) 83' (red card); Reeves (yellow card) 119' | Report (USL) | Hassen 56'; Bissohong (yellow card) 69'; Perez 85'; Chantal 117' | Stadium: Maryland SoccerPlex; Referee: Bryan Roslund |

=== Second round ===
| June 24, 2008 | (Ohio) Cleveland City Stars (USL-2) | 2–0 (a.e.t.) | Minnesota Thunder (USL-1) | Blaine, Minnesota |
| 7:00 ET | Williams (yellow card) 76'; Franks 104' 119' (pen.); Stovall (red card) 105' | Report (Cleveland); Report (Minnesota) | Gibson (yellow card) 76'; Kallman (yellow card) 107'; Platter (yellow card) 118' | Stadium: National Sports Center; Referee: Jorge Oconitrillo |

| June 24, 2008 | (Maryland) Crystal Palace Baltimore (USL-2) | 2–2 (a.e.t.) (3–1 p) | (Pennsylvania) Harrisburg City Islanders (USL-2) | Harrisburg, Pennsylvania |
| 7:05 ET | King 10' (red card) 31'; Brooks (yellow card) 55'; Medd (coach) (red card) 56'; Mark (yellow card) 60'; Robson (yellow card) 73'; Harkin (yellow card) 102'; Mbuta 105' | Report (Harrisburg) | Calvano 24'; Marples (yellow card) 35'; Ombiji (red card) 63'; Pope (yellow card) 118'; Hoshide 120' (pen.) | Stadium: Skyline Sports Complex; Attendance: 1,100+ Referee: Tim Snyder |
| | Penalties |
| | Lookingland (penalty missed); Kante (penalty scored); Lewis (penalty missed); Healey (penalty scored); Teixeira (penalty scored) | | (penalty missed) Hoshide; (penalty scored) Devlin; (penalty missed) Wiesner; (penalty missed) Clay |

| June 24, 2008 | (Virginia) Richmond Kickers (USL-2) | 2–1 | (Massachusetts) Western Mass Pioneers (USL-2) | Ludlow, Massachusetts |
| 7:30 ET | Nyazamba (yellow card) 48' (goal) 84'; Jones 59'; Bennett (yellow card) 62'; Harding (yellow card) 90'; Viray (red card) 90' | Report (Richmond); Report (Western Mass) | Petrarca (yellow card) 40'; Glaeser (yellow card) 60' (yellow-red card) 90'; Deren 63'; Lima (yellow card) 81'; Molinari (yellow card) 89' (yellow-red card) 90'; Augustine (red card) 90' | Stadium: Lusitano Stadium; Referee: Niko Bratsis |

| June 24, 2008 | Real Maryland Monarchs (USL-2) | 0–1 | (North Carolina) Carolina RailHawks (USL-1) | Cary, North Carolina |
| 7:30 ET | Basso (yellow card) 17'; Ramirez (yellow card) 74' | Report (Carolina) | Segovia (yellow card) 45'; Low (yellow card) 72' (goal) 90+' (pen.) | Stadium: WakeMed Soccer Park; Referee: Mark Kadlecik |

| June 24, 2008 | (Pennsylvania) Pittsburgh Riverhounds (USL-2) | 0–3 | (New York (state)) Rochester Rhinos (USL-1) | Rochester, New York |
| 7:30 ET | | Report (Pittsburgh); Report (Rochester) | Menyongar 26'; Roberto (yellow card) 40'; Salles 61' (yellow card) 64'; Charles (yellow card) 66'; Guppy (red card) 70'; Kreamalmeyer 75'; Vallow (yellow card) 87' | Stadium: PAETEC Park; Attendance: 3,526; Referee: Jeffrey Mellen |

| June 24, 2008 | (North Carolina) Charlotte Eagles (USL-2) | 1–2 | (South Carolina) Charleston Battery (USL-1) | Charleston, South Carolina |
| 7:30 ET | Bryant (yellow card) 35'; Herrara 67'; Swinehart (yellow card) 84' | Report (Charlotte); Report (Charleston) | Spicer 12'; Alonso 90+' (pen.) | Stadium: Blackbaud Stadium; Referee: Skye Arthur-Banning |

| June 24, 2008 | (Georgia (U.S. state)) Atlanta Silverbacks (USL-1) | 0–1 | (Florida) Miami FC (USL-1) | Miami, Florida |
| 8:00 ET | Buete (yellow card) 67' | Report (Atlanta); Report (Miami) | Afonso 40'; Saunders (yellow card) 53'; Inacio (yellow card) 54'; Ramirez (yellow card) 69'; Cameron (yellow card) 83' | Stadium: Tropical Park Stadium; Referee: Roni Canales |

| June 24, 2008 | (California) Hollywood United F.C. (USASA) | 0–6 | (Washington (state)) Seattle Sounders (USL-1) | Tukwila, Washington |
| 11:00 ET | Barragan (yellow card) 2'; Pinto (yellow card) 56'; Dunseth (yellow card) 57' | Report (Seattle) | Scott 3'; Gardner 15' (yellow card) 16'; Le Toux 22' 38' 60' 63'; Treschuk (yellow card) 50'; Besagno (yellow card) 80' | Stadium: Starfire Sports Complex; Referee: Kevin O'Daniel |

=== Third round ===
| July 1, 2008 | (Virginia) Richmond Kickers (USL-2) | 0–3 | (Massachusetts) New England Revolution (MLS) | New Britain, Connecticut |
| 7:00 ET | | Report (Richmond); Report (New England) | Brill 46'; Germanese 63'; Twellman 67' | Stadium: Veteran's Stadium; Attendance: 3,950; Referee: Tony Russo (Georgia) |

| July 1, 2008 | (Texas) Houston Dynamo (MLS) | 1–1 (a.e.t.) (3–4 p) | (South Carolina) Charleston Battery (USL-1) | Charleston, South Carolina |
| 7:30 ET | S. Wondolowski 89' | Report (Houston); Report (Charleston) | Reda 31' | Stadium: Blackbaud Stadium; Attendance: 3,103; Referee: Joe Caroccio (Florida) |
| | Penalties |
| | Holden (penalty scored); C. Wondolowski (penalty scored); Cameron (penalty missed); Hayden (penalty scored); Caraccio (penalty missed) | | (penalty scored) Alonso; (penalty scored) Armstrong; (penalty scored) Spicer; (penalty scored) Velten |

| July 1, 2008 | (New Jersey) New York Red Bulls (MLS) | 0–2 | (Maryland) Crystal Palace Baltimore (USL-2) | Annapolis, Maryland |
| 7:30 ET | Magee (yellow card) 26' (yellow-red card) 90+2' | Report (New York); Report (Baltimore) | Marshall 18'; Mark (yellow card) 21'; Harkin (yellow card) 26'; Brooks (yellow card) 30' (goal) 75'; Kante (yellow card) 30' (yellow-red card) 34'; Mbuta (yellow card) 44' | Stadium: Lawrence E. Knight Stadium; Attendance: 1,654; Referee: Andrew Chapin (Virginia) |

| July 1, 2008 | Kansas City Wizards (MLS) | 4–2 (a.e.t.) | (North Carolina) Carolina RailHawks (USL-1) | Cary, North Carolina |
| 7:30 ET | Trujillo 68' 94'; López 82' (pen.); Morsink (yellow card) 104'; López (yellow card) 111'; Pore (yellow card) 117' (goal) 119' | Report (Kansas City); Report (Carolina) | Fusilier 43'; Watson 58'; Solle (yellow card) 89' (yellow-red card) 108'; Dombrowski (red card) 120' | Stadium: WakeMed Soccer Park; Attendance: 3,116; Referee: Niko Bratsis (Massachusetts) |

| July 1, 2008 | (New York (state)) Rochester Rhinos (USL-1) | 0–2 | (Washington, D.C.) D.C. United (MLS) | Boyds, Maryland |
| 7:30 ET | Bonseu (yellow card) 79'; Fitzpatrick (yellow card) 84'; Salles (yellow card) 90' | Report (Rochester); Report (D.C.) | Burch 78' 85' | Stadium: Maryland SoccerPlex; Attendance: 2,752; Referee: Mark Kadlecik (North Carolina) |

| July 1, 2008 | (Ohio) Cleveland City Stars (USL-2) | 1–4 | (Illinois) Chicago Fire (MLS) | Bridgeview, Illinois |
| 8:30 ET | McClung 61'; Stewart (yellow card) 78' | Report | Banner 13' 73'; Carr 23'; Barrett 26'; Mármol (yellow card) 57' | Stadium: Toyota Park; Attendance: 6,678; Referee: Hidajet Tica (Iowa) |

| July 1, 2008 | (Florida) Miami FC (USL-1) | 1–2 | (Texas) FC Dallas (MLS) | Frisco, Texas |
| 8:30 ET | Afonso 7'; Nunes (yellow card) 36' de Mata (yellow card) 88' | Report (Miami); Report (Dallas) | Thompson 45+3' 90+2'; Moor (yellow card) 84' | Stadium: Pizza Hut Park; Attendance: 6,559; Referee: Jasen Anno (Texas) |

| July 1, 2008 | (California) Chivas USA (MLS) | 0–2 | (Washington (state)) Seattle Sounders (USL-1) | Tukwila, Washington |
| 10:00 ET | Kljestan (yellow card) 69' | Report (Chivas); Report (Seattle) | Graham 43'; Schmid (yellow card) 64'; Le Toux 80'; O'Brien (yellow card) 81' | Stadium: Starfire Sports Complex; Attendance: 2,997; Referee: Yader Reyes (California) |

=== Quarterfinals ===
| July 8, 2008 | (Maryland) Crystal Palace Baltimore (USL-2) | 1–1 (a.e.t.) (3–5 p) | (Massachusetts) New England Revolution (MLS) | New Britain, Connecticut |
| 7:00 ET | Lader 20'; Teixeira (yellow card) 78'; Harkin (yellow card) 109'; Flores (red card) 119' | Report (Baltimore); Report (New England) | Mansally 6'; Igwe (yellow card) 33'; Hilgenbrinck (yellow card) 59' | Stadium: Veteran's Stadium; Attendance: 2,590; Referee: Hilario Grajeda (Ohio) |
| | Penalties |
| | Harada (penalty scored); Harkin (penalty scored); Mbuta (penalty scored); Teixeira (penalty missed) | | (penalty scored) Hilgenbrinck; (penalty scored) Dube; (penalty scored) Tierney; (penalty scored) Igwe; (penalty scored) Castro |

| July 8, 2008 | (Illinois) Chicago Fire (MLS) | 1–2 (a.e.t.) | (Washington, D.C.) D.C. United (MLS) | Boyds, Maryland |
| 7:30 ET | Woolard 36'; Soumaré (yellow card) 48'; Pause (yellow card) 78'; Thorrington (yellow card) 81'; Blanco (red card) 108' | Report (Chicago); Report (D.C.) | Doe (yellow card) 52' (goal) 77'; Moreno (yellow card) 89'; Namoff 99'; Fred (yellow card) 107'; Burch (red card) 108' | Stadium: Maryland SoccerPlex; Attendance: 4,118; Referee: Shane Moody (Florida) |

| July 8, 2008 | (South Carolina) Charleston Battery (USL-1) | 3–1 | (Texas) FC Dallas (MLS) | Frisco, Texas |
| 8:30 ET | Alavanja 28'; Fuller 43'; King (yellow card) 77'; Patterson 91+' | Report (Charleston); Report (Dallas) | Cooper 94+' | Stadium: Pizza Hut Park; Attendance: 5,911; Referee: Doug Wolff (Missouri) |

| July 8, 2008 | Kansas City Wizards (MLS) | 0–0 (a.e.t.) (5–6 p) | (Washington (state)) Seattle Sounders (USL-1) | Seattle, Washington |
| 10:00 ET | | Report (Seattle) | | Stadium: Qwest Field; Attendance: 4,674; Referee: Jeremy Vehar (New Mexico) |
| | Penalties |
| | Pore (penalty scored); Conrad (penalty missed); McMahen (penalty scored); Espinoza (penalty scored); Zavagnin (penalty scored); Harrington (penalty scored); Wahl (penalty missed) | | (penalty scored) Jackson; (penalty missed) Le Toux; (penalty scored) Treschuk; (penalty scored) Sakuda; (penalty scored) O'Brien; (penalty scored) Kanté; (penalty scored) Scott |

=== Semifinals ===
| August 12, 2008 | (Massachusetts) New England Revolution (MLS) | 1–3 | (Washington, D.C.) D.C. United (MLS) | Washington, D.C. |
| 7:30 ET | Germanese 34'; Iqwe (yellow card) 38'; Thompson (yellow card) 54' (yellow-red card) 71' | Report (New England); Report (D.C.) | Emilio 4' 81'; Quaranta 48' | Stadium: RFK Stadium; Attendance: 6,797; Referee: Jorge Gonzalez (New York) |

| August 12, 2008 | (Washington (state)) Seattle Sounders (USL-1) | 1–1 (3–4 p) | (South Carolina) Charleston Battery (USL-1) | Charleston, South Carolina |
| 7:30 ET | Alonso 20' (o.g.); Scott (yellow card) 43'; Graham (yellow card) 63'; Forrest (yellow card) 97' | Report (Seattle) | Patterson 32'; Fuller (yellow card) 58' | Stadium: Blackbaud Stadium; Attendance: 3,798; Referee: Oscar Ortiz (Florida) |
| | Penalties |
| | Jackson (penalty scored); Le Toux (penalty missed); Sakuda (penalty scored); C. O'Brien (penalty scored); Forrest (penalty missed) | | (penalty scored) Armstrong; (penalty scored) Alonso; (penalty missed) Richardson; (penalty scored) Velten; (penalty scored) Akwari |

=== Final ===
September 3, 2008
7:30 ET

| (South Carolina) Charleston Battery (USL-1) | 1–2 | (Washington, D.C.) D.C. United (MLS) |
|---|---|---|
| Fuller 10'; Nylen (yellow card) 33'; Alonso (yellow card) 62' | Report (D.C.); Report (Charleston) | Emilio 4'; Martínez (yellow card) 35'; Simms (yellow card) 46'; Fred 50' |

RFK Stadium
Washington, D.C.
Attendance: 8,212
Referee: Mark Geiger (New Jersey)

| Charleston Battery | D.C. United |

Lamar Hunt U.S. Open Cup
2008 Champion

D.C. United
2nd title

== Top scorers ==
| Position | Player | Club | Goals |
|---|---|---|---|
| 1 | Sébastien Le Toux | Seattle Sounders | 5 |
| 2 | Darren Spicer | Charleston Battery | 4 |
| | Alex Afonso | Miami FC | 4 |
| 4 | Emilio | D.C. United | 3 |
