= 2008 FC Dallas season =

FC Dallas
2008 season
- Owner: Clark Hunt
- Head coach: Steve Morrow (until May 20); Marco Ferruzzi (May 20-June 16); Schellas Hyndman(June 16 onward)
- Stadium: Pizza Hut Park
- MLS: Conference: 5th Overall: 11th
- U.S. Open Cup: Lost Quarterfinal vs. Charleston Battery (1–3)
- Brimstone Cup: Won Championship vs. Chicago Fire (2–0)
- Texas Derby: Won Championship vs. Houston Dynamo (0–0 – 3)
- Highest home attendance: 23,500 (May 18 vs. Los Angeles Galaxy)
- Lowest home attendance: 7,103 (October 2 vs. San Jose Earthquakes)
- Average home league attendance: 13,024
Home colors	Away colors

The 2008 FC Dallas season was the twelfth season of the Major League Soccer team. The team failed to make the postseason for the first time in four years.

== Final standings ==
Pos	Team	Pld	W	L	T	GF	GA	GD	Pts	Qualification
1	Houston Dynamo	30	13	5	12	45	32	+13	51	MLS Cup Playoffs
2	Chivas USA	30	12	11	7	40	41	−1	43	MLS Cup Playoffs
3	Real Salt Lake	30	10	10	10	40	39	+1	40	MLS Cup Playoffs
4	Colorado Rapids	30	11	14	5	44	45	−1	38	
5	FC Dallas	30	8	10	12	45	41	+4	36	
6	LA Galaxy	30	8	13	9	55	62	−7	33	
7	San Jose Earthquakes	30	8	13	9	32	38	−6	33	

Source: MLS

== Regular season ==
March 30, 2008 1	Chivas USA	1–1	FC Dallas	Frisco, Texas
				Stadium: Pizza Hut Park; Attendance: 17,540

April 6, 2008 2 Texas Derby	FC Dallas	3–3	Houston Dynamo	Houston, Texas
				Stadium: Robertson Stadium; Attendance: 20,102

April 12, 2008 3	New York Red Bulls	0–2	FC Dallas	Frisco, Texas
				Stadium: Pizza Hut Park; Attendance: 11.564

April 20, 2008 4	FC Dallas	2–0	Chivas USA	Carson, California
				Stadium: The Home Depot Center; Attendance: 10,237

April 24, 2008 5	New England Revolution	1–0	FC Dallas	Frisco, Texas
				Stadium: Pizza Hut Park; Attendance: 10,453

May 3, 2008 6	FC Dallas	0–0	San Jose Earthquakes	Santa Clara, California
				Stadium: Buck Shaw Stadium; Attendance: 10,515

May 10, 2008 7	FC Dallas	1–2	Real Salt Lake	Salt Lake City, Utah
				Stadium: Rice-Eccles Stadium; Attendance: 12,173

May 18, 2008 8	Los Angeles Galaxy	5–1	FC Dallas	Frisco, Texas
				Stadium: Pizza Hut Park; Attendance: 23,500

May 24, 2008 9	Real Salt Lake	1–2	FC Dallas	Frisco, Texas
				Stadium: Pizza Hut Park; Attendance: 8,960

May 28, 2008 10 Texas Derby	Houston Dynamo	2–2	FC Dallas	Frisco, Texas
				Stadium: Pizza Hut Park; Attendance: 8,541

June 1, 2008 11	FC Dallas	1–2	Colorado Rapids	Commerce City, Colorado
				Stadium: Dick's Sporting Goods Park; Attendance: 12,120

June 6, 2008 12	FC Dallas	1–2	New England Revolution	Foxborough, Massachusetts
				Stadium: Gillette Stadium

June 15, 2008 13 Brimstone Cup	Chicago Fire	0–1	FC Dallas	Frisco, Texas
				Stadium: Pizza Hut Park; Attendance: 14,738

June 21, 2008 14	FC Dallas	0–1	New York Red Bulls	East Rutherford, New Jersey
				Stadium: Giants Stadium; Attendance: 16,427

June 26, 2008 15 Texas Derby	FC Dallas	1–1	Houston Dynamo	Houston, Texas
				Stadium: Robertson Stadium; Attendance: 16,933

July 4, 2008 16	Kansas City Wizards	1–1	FC Dallas	Frisco, Texas
				Stadium: Pizza Hut Park; Attendance: 16,765

July 19, 2008 17	Colorado Rapids	2–2	FC Dallas	Frisco, Texas
				Stadium: Pizza Hut Park; Attendance: 12,289

July 27, 2008 18	Los Angeles Galaxy	0–4	FC Dallas	Frisco, Texas
				Stadium: Pizza Hut Park; Attendance: 21,020

August 3, 2008 19	FC Dallas	2–0	Toronto FC	Toronto, Ontario
				Stadium: BMO Field; Attendance: 20,247

August 16, 2008 20	FC Dallas	1–2	Columbus Crew	Columbus, Ohio
				Stadium: Crew Stadium; Attendance: 17,647

August 23, 2008 21	FC Dallas	1–1	Kansas City Wizards	Kansas City, Kansas
				Stadium: CommunityAmerica Ballpark; Attendance: 9,825

August 30, 2008 22	Columbus Crew	2–1	FC Dallas	Frisco, Texas
				Stadium: Pizza Hut Park; Attendance: 10,590

September 4, 2008 23	Colorado Rapids	1–0	FC Dallas	Frisco, Texas
				Stadium: Pizza Hut Park; Attendance: 7,140

September 13, 2008 24	FC Dallas	2–2	D.C. United	Washington, D.C.
				Stadium: RFK Stadium; Attendance: 19.890

September 21, 2008 25 Brimstone Cup	FC Dallas	4–1	Chicago Fire	Bridgeview, Illinois
				Stadium: Toyota Park; Attendance: 16,923

September 28, 2008 26	D.C. United	0–3	FC Dallas	Frisco, Texas
				Stadium: Pizza Hut Park; Attendance: 12,138

October 2, 2008 27	San Jose Earthquakes	1–1	FC Dallas	Frisco, Texas
				Stadium: Pizza Hut Park; Attendance: 7,103

October 11, 2008 28	Toronto FC	2–2	FC Dallas	Frisco, Texas
				Stadium: Pizza Hut Park; Attendance: 14,114

October 18, 2008 29	FC Dallas	1–3	Real Salt Lake	Sandy, Utah
				Stadium: Rio Tinto Stadium; Attendance: 17,628

October 26, 2008 30	FC Dallas	2–2	Los Angeles Galaxy	Carson, California
				Stadium: The Home Depot Center; Attendance: 27.000

== U.S. Open Cup ==
July 1, 2008 Third Round	Miami FC (Florida)	1–2	(Texas) FC Dallas	Frisco, Texas
	Afonso 7'; Nunes (yellow card) 36' de Mata (yellow card) 88'		Thompson 45+3', 90+2'; Moor (yellow card) 84'	Stadium: Pizza Hut Park; Attendance: 6,559

July 8, 2008 Quarterfinal	Charleston Battery (North Carolina)	3–1	(Texas) FC Dallas	Frisco, Texas
	Alavanja 28'; Fuller 43'; King (yellow card) 77'; Patterson 90+1'		Cooper 90+4'	Stadium: Pizza Hut Park; Attendance: 5,911
