= Thornwood, Glasgow =

Area of Glasgow, Scotland

Coordinates: 55.871583°N 4.318978°W

Thornwood: Scottish Gaelic: A' Choille Dhroighinn; Scots: Thornwid
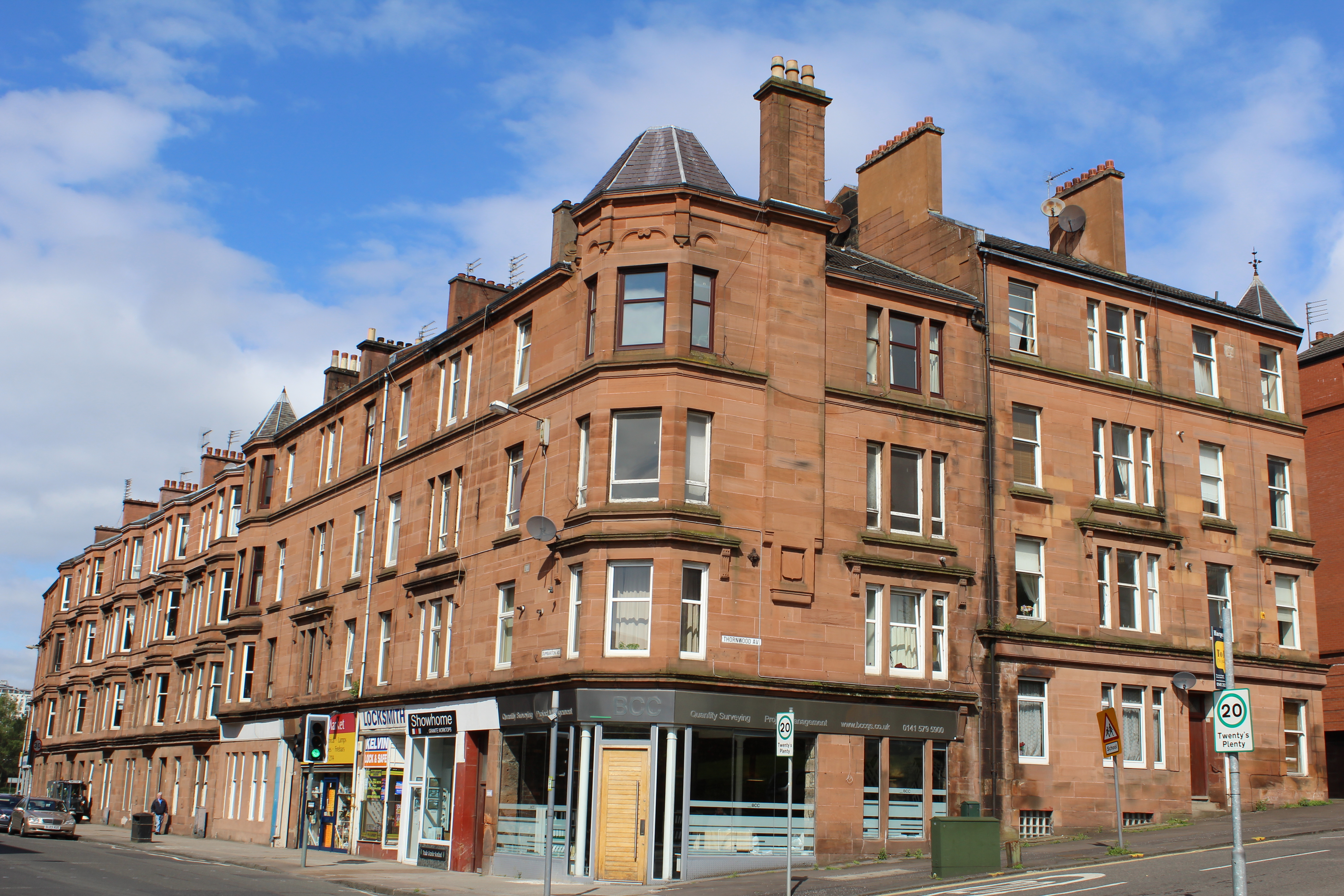
- Corner of Dumbarton Road and Thornwood Avenue

- Location within Glasgow
- OS grid reference: NS550667
- Council area: Glasgow City Council
- Lieutenancy area: Glasgow
- Country: Scotland
- Sovereign state: United Kingdom
- Post town: GLASGOW
- Postcode district: G11 7
- Dialling code: 0141
- Police: Scotland
- Fire: Scottish
- Ambulance: Scottish
- UK Parliament: Glasgow North West
- Scottish Parliament: Glasgow Kelvin; Glasgow

Thornwood (Scottish Gaelic: A' Choille Dhroighinn) is a largely residential area of Glasgow, Scotland, lying north of the River Clyde. Part of the city's West End, it is situated almost on the river between Partick to the east and south and Broomhill to the north and west; the neighbourhoods of Whiteinch, Glasgow Harbour and Hyndland are also fairly close.

== Location ==
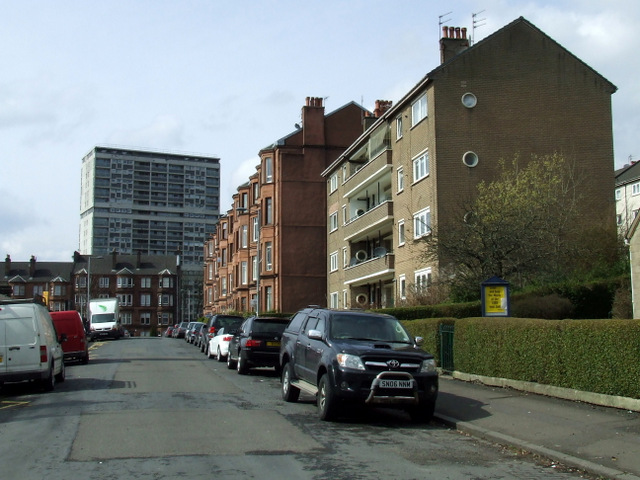
Thornwood Terrace

Thornwood's boundaries are not precisely defined but could be seen as the territory between Crow Road, Thornwood Drive and Dumbarton Road, a small but densely populated area dominated by four-storey tenements. It was part of the burgh of Partick until the absorption of that burgh into the expanding city of Glasgow in 1912. Most local amenities can be found in Partick or Broomhill, including a retail park, Gartnavel General Hospital, the University of Glasgow and Byres Road, popular for socialising, within 1 mile (1.6 km) distance, although Thornwood does have its own selection of small shops and bars.

The area is served by Partick railway station which is also a stop on the Glasgow Subway system. The Clydeside Expressway (A814) road runs to the south of Thornwood, terminating where that route meets the Clyde Tunnel which provides a link to the south-west of the city (Linthouse and the Queen Elizabeth University Hospital) for vehicles and pedestrians.

=== Schools ===
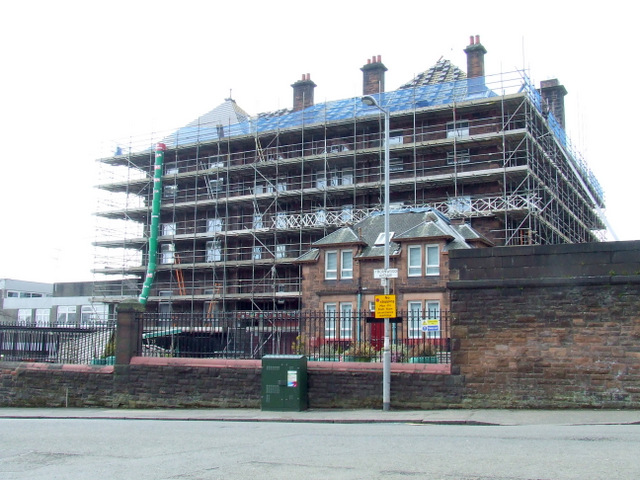
Thornwood Primary School

Thornwood Primary School is the primary school which serves the local area. The building also houses Thornwood Nursery Class and Rosepark Learning Centre, which had changed its name at early April 2010 to GDSS (General Dyslexic Social Services), a special needs school. All of these services are operated by Glasgow City Council's Education department.

Thornwood Primary is one of four primary schools (along with Broomhill Primary School, Whiteinch Primary School and Hyndland Primary School) associated with Hyndland Secondary School, and part of the Hyndland New Learning Community. The local Catholic primary schools, Notre Dame and St Paul's, are located in Partick and Whiteinch respectively, while the secondary school, St Thomas Aquinas, is in Broomhill.

=== Parks ===
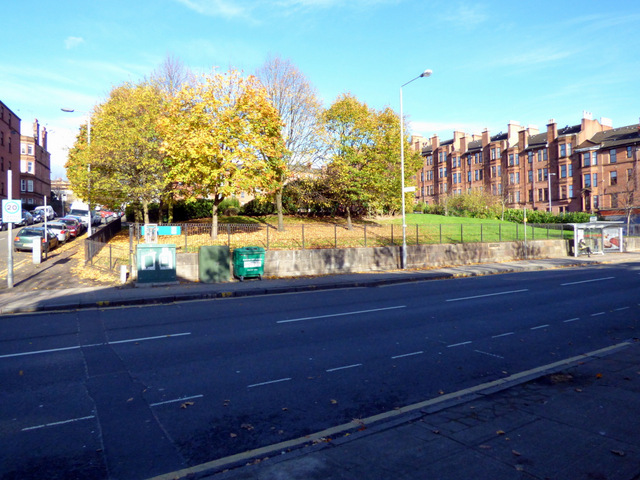
Thornwood Park

Thornwood Park, which has been refurbished, is situated in front/across from the primary school, featuring an AstroTurf pitch, a separate fenced playground and a picnic area with benches and tables. The park was created from the space left by the removal of disused railway lines. To the north of the neighbourhood, Cross Park also has play facilities for children as well as grass and wooded areas.

The larger Victoria Park is nearby to the west.
