= Broomhill, Glasgow =

District of Glasgow, Scotland

Coordinates: 55.875981°N 4.324036°W

Broomhill: Scottish Gaelic: Cnoc a' Bhealaidh
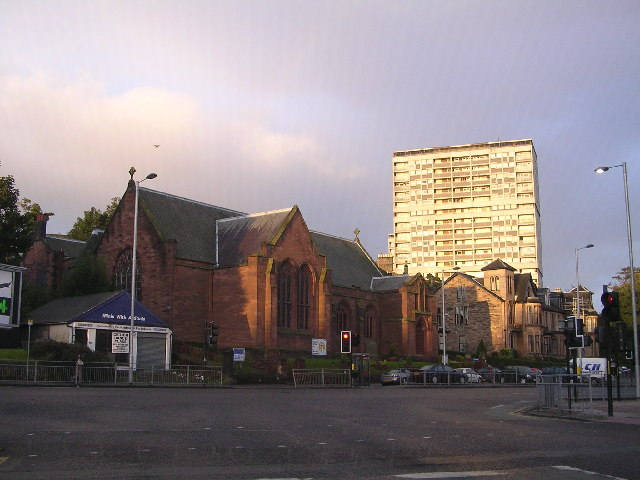

- Location within Glasgow
- OS grid reference: NS547672
- Council area: Glasgow City Council
- Lieutenancy area: Glasgow
- Country: Scotland
- Sovereign state: United Kingdom
- Post town: GLASGOW
- Postcode district: G11
- Dialling code: 0141
- Police: Scotland
- Fire: Scottish
- Ambulance: Scottish
- UK Parliament: Glasgow North West
- Scottish Parliament: Glasgow Kelvin Glasgow (region)

Broomhill (Scottish Gaelic: Cnoc a' Bhealaidh) is a district in the West End of the city of Glasgow, Scotland. North of the River Clyde, it is bounded by the districts of Thornwood and Partick to the south, Hyndland to the east, and Jordanhill, Scotstoun and Victoria Park to the west.

The main streets in the district are Crow Road (Scottish Gaelic: Rathad na Feannaig) and Broomhill Drive (Scottish Gaelic: Dràibh Chnoc a' Bhealaidh). Crow Road is a main artery in the West End and provides links to Partick at its south end and Anniesland at its north end.

Transport to and from the area is supported by First Glasgow bus services 4 & 16 along Crow Road, and various "dial buses" on Broomhill Drive, and the nearby train stations of Hyndland and Jordanhill.

It is a wealthy neighbourhood populated mainly by businessmen, lawyers, GPs, professionals (many employed at the nearby University of Glasgow) and a number of noted authors, poets, actors, comedians and footballers. Average property prices in the area are considerably higher than the Glasgow or Scottish averages.

== Schools ==
Broomhill Primary School's facilities previously consisted of two buildings – the 'annexe' which housed the younger children and the main building with classrooms for the older members of the school. In 2018 a modern building for the entire school was opened, featuring an all-weather sports pitch. The old annex closed, and its demolition began in late 2019.

Three state secondary schools serve the area. The recently refurbished, non-denominational Hyndland Secondary and the recently rebuilt Roman Catholic St Thomas Aquinas are the two main secondary schools.

The area also has a 'college school', Jordanhill School, situated next to the Jordanhill College campus, which is directly funded by the Scottish Government because it was a demonstrator school for the former Jordanhill College of Education, now part of the University of Strathclyde. This school has recently undergone major development work including new science labs in a new building, and sports facilities. Despite the fact that it is within the local authority's education provision, so many local parents wish their children to attend Jordanhill that there is a waiting list, with names being posted from a very early age. Well-performing children may also get referrals from their primary school teachers to help them.

There are also three independent, fee-paying schools nearby: Kelvinside Academy, High School of Glasgow and The Glasgow Academy.

== Retail and other local services ==
Broomhill has its own shopping centre located on Broomhill Drive, with shops including a newsagent, a restaurant, a laundrette, Papa John's, a dentist's surgery and a Co-op convenience store.

There is also a large number of shops on Crow Road, including cafes and restaurants, Café Circa and a café bar and restaurant, The Marlborough. There is a gift and jewellery shop, a florist, a driving school, several hairdressers, a hardware shop with emergency call-out locksmith service, a funeral director, Gray's Kitchen Delicatessen, award-winning butcher "Christies" and various general grocers/newsagents.

== Sport ==
Broomhill Sports Club is a local parent-led, inclusive, multi-sports club. The club is based at several local schools and welcomes children and adults in to participate in several sports. The club was founded by Broomhill Primary Parents in 2004 and now has a membership of more than 700 local children. The club also provided the foundations for the local semi-professional football club, Broomhill F.C.

There are also clubs for boxing/martial arts, lawn bowls and tennis in the area.

== Churches ==
The local Church of Scotland parish church is Broomhill Hyndland Church (a merger with the neighbouring congregation in 2017), founded in 1899 and home to several community organisations including Brownies, Guides and the 130th Glasgow Boys Brigade Company. Another local church, with similar associated clubs, is Balshsgray Victoria Park (BVP); the local Roman Catholic congregation is served by the church of Our Lady of Perpetual Succour.

== Army and Territorial Army ==
There is also the 207 (City of Glasgow) Battery Headquarters and C Troop, 105th Regiment Royal Artillery (Volunteers) – Royal Artillery. This is one of the locations of the 207 Battery, Lanarkshire and Lothian gunners. HQ (Cameronian) and C (Lanark) Troop is based on Crow Road, whilst D (Lothian) is based in Edinburgh. Within the base, there are drill halls, classrooms, stores, armoury, garages, kitchens, and bars.

The Territorial Army shares its base with 'A' Troop Royal Artillery, a detachment of the Glasgow & Lanarkshire Battalion Army Cadet Force. This group is amongst the most popular in Scotland with 12 to 17-year-olds.

The base is also home to 62 (2nd Glasgow) Squadron of the Air Training Corps, one of the largest and most successful squadrons in the Glasgow and West of Scotland Wing.

== Housing ==
Broomhill has a variety of housing throughout the district. Victorian tenements similar to those in neighbouring Hyndland are predominant, but there are areas of terraced and semi-detached housing in the area.

As well as significant renovation to Social Housing in the area, undertaken in 2013, the building of the former Anniesland College at the bottom of Broomhill Drive is to be converted into several luxury apartments, restoring the main Victorian facade.

== See also ==
- Glasgow tower blocks
