= Michael Richardson =

Michael Richardson may refer to:

== Sports ==
=== Gridiron football ===
- Mike Richardson (American football, born 1961), former professional American football player of the 1980s
- Mike Richardson (American football, born 1984), professional American football player
- Mike Richardson (running back, born 1946), American football player
- Mike Richardson (running back, born 1969), former professional Canadian football player

=== Other sports ===
- Mike Richardson (Australian footballer) (born 1959), former Australian rules footballer
- Mike Richardson (soccer) (born 1985), American professional soccer player who plays as a midfielder
- Michael Richardson (English footballer) (born 1992), English professional footballer who plays as a midfielder
- Michael Richardson (cricketer) (born 1986), South African born English cricketer
- Mike Richardson (Scottish cricketer) (born 1969)

== Other ==
- Michael Richardson (politician) (born 1949), Australian politician
- Mike Richardson (publisher) (born 1950), publisher of Dark Horse Comics
- Michael Richardson (investment banker) (1925–2003), British investment banker

== See also ==
- Micheal Ray Richardson (1955–2025), American basketball player and coach
- Micheál Richardson (born 1995), Irish actor
- Mick Richardson (1872–1920), English footballer active in the 1890s
