= Hyndland EMU Depot =

Disused railway maintenance depot in Hyndland, Glasgow

- Interactive map of Hyndland EMU Depot

Location
- Location: Hyndland, Glasgow
- Coordinates: 55°52′49″N 4°18′21″W
- OS grid: NS557676

Characteristics
- Owner: British Rail
- Depot code: HY (1973 - 1987)
- Type: EMU

History
- Opened: 1961
- Closed: 1987

Hyndland EMU Depot was an electric traction depot located in Hyndland, Glasgow, Scotland. The depot was situated on the North Clyde Line and was near Hyndland station.

The depot code is HY.

== History ==
In 1982, Class 303 and 314 EMUs could be seen at the depot.

The depot was opened in 1961 to house the newly introduced Glasgow Blue train fleet. The depot was purpose built on the site of the former Hyndland Station. It comprised nine roads, three of which were undercover and could house six units. These were 2, 3 and 4 roads respectively. Light maintenance was performed on site, with heavier maintenance requiring visits to Glasgow Works or Shields Depot after it opened in 1967. The Depot also became home to the class 314 fleet when introduced in 1979. This also required an influx of additional staff and the need to commence working shifts. Following the failure of the APT project, BR oversaw a programme of rationalisation of its maintenance function and locations. Having closed Hamilton Depot in 1981, staff were dispersed to other locations. The proposed closure of Hyndland Depot meant the same process and staff transferred to Shields in 1986. A skeleton staff remained in place, until the newly opened servicing depot at Yoker was fully operational. Hyndland closed in 1987, bringing the curtain down on 25 years of maintenance work at the site.
