= Victoria Park, Glasgow =

Park in Glasgow, Scotland

Victoria Park
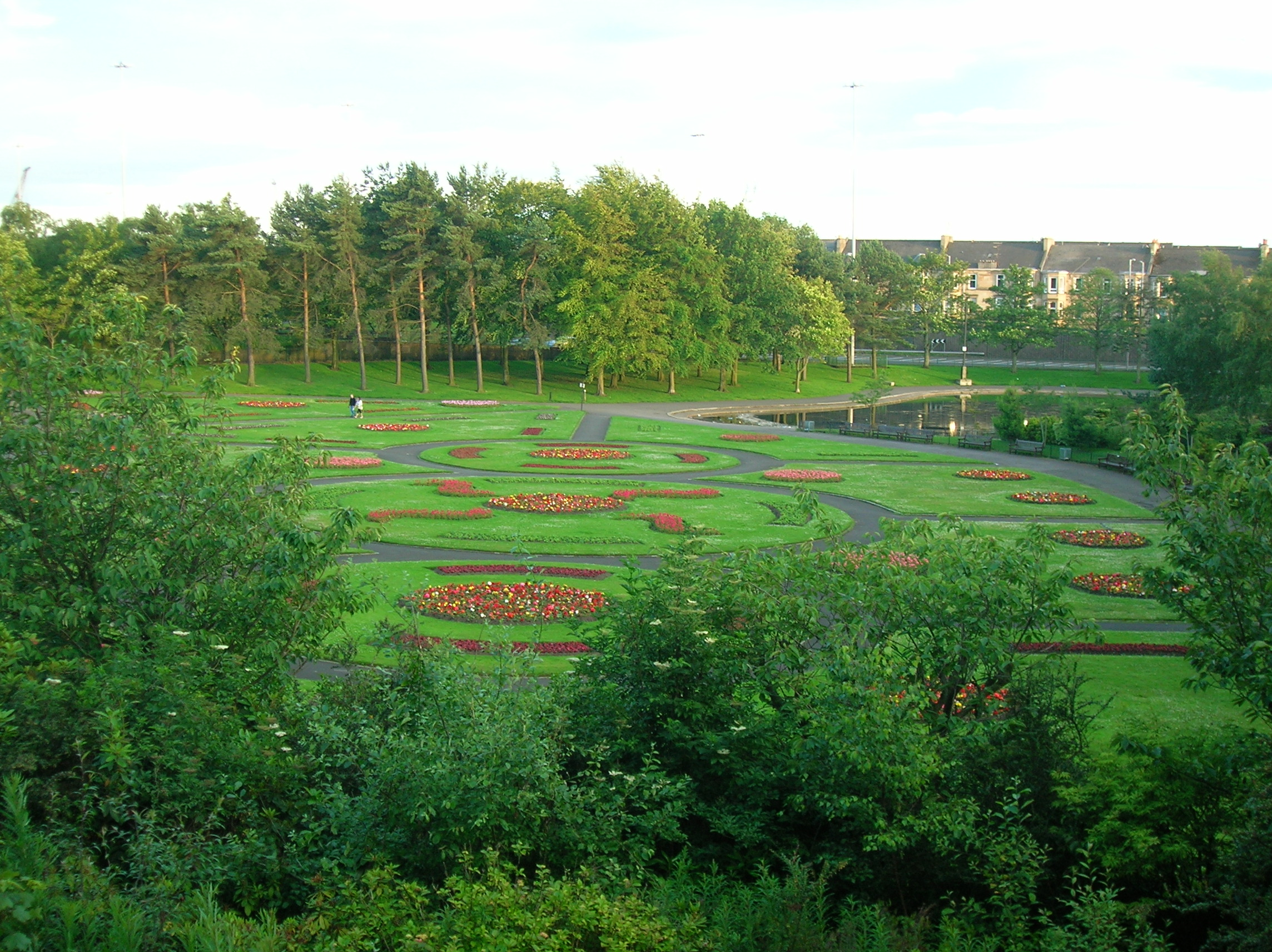
- Interactive map of Victoria Park
- Type: Public park
- Location: Glasgow, Scotland
- OS grid: NS5404067260
- Coordinates: 55°52′35″N 4°20′00″W
- Area: 20 hectares (50 acres)
- Opened: 2 July 1887

Inventory of Gardens and Designed Landscapes in Scotland
- Official name: Victoria Park
- Designated: 31 March 2006
- Reference no.: GDL00382
- Operated by: Glasgow City Council

Victoria Park is a 20-hectare (50-acre) park located in the west of Glasgow, Scotland, adjacent to the districts of Scotstoun, Whiteinch, Jordanhill and Broomhill. The park was created and named for Queen Victoria's jubilee in 1887. The main entrances to the park are from Westland Drive, Victoria Park Drive North, and Balshagray Avenue. The Friends of Victoria Park (FoVP) is a West Glasgow group set up to protect and develop Victoria Park.

== Main features ==
There are a number of features within Victoria Park:

- A memorial honouring the local residents who died in World War I and World War II.
- A children's playpark with climbing frames and swings.
- A pond, with two small islands. The larger island is connected on both sides by iron bridges.
- A fully restored four-dial miniature lamp post clock, donated by William Gordon Oswald in 1888.
- The Jubilee Gates situated at the Victoria Park North Drive entrance were erected and funded by the 'Ladies of Partick' in 1887. They were manufactured by Macfarlane's Saracen Foundry at a cost of £100. They bear the Partick Burgh coat of arms. In 1987 (the gates' centenary year) they underwent a restoration, and the gates have recently had another restoration to the original colours of red and gold.
- The Fossil Grove - During the park's construction in the late 19th century, when a pilot channel for the road was cut through a large area of rock, the builders discovered preserved fossilised tree trunks. The route for the road was then diverted and the sand and shale further excavated to reveal more fossils.
- Scotland's most northerly parakeet flock.
- Monument to SS Daphne

== Facilities ==
Victoria Park has the following facilities;

- An orienteering course
- A model yachting course
- Children's play areas
- Bowling greens
- Tennis courts
- Basketball courts
- A putting course
- Several gardens

== History ==
At the instigation of the Council, the work of building the park was supervised by Isdale Robertson (1848–1904) who had his premises in Anderson Street, Partick. The workforce was made up of unemployed men in need of an occupation to see them through a difficult period. It was this team of men who unearthed the fossil grove. It was also at the insistence of Isdale that the four faced clock was placed in the park. According to his adopted daughter, Meg Crerar, it bore the inscription "Now is the day of salvation, Now is the accepted time, Now is the day of Salvation". The gates were paid for by local women who subscribed a penny each, said to be partly in gratitude for providing work for their men and partly for keeping them sober, Whiteinch having been designated a "dry" area. Isdale Robertson was an active member of the Whiteinch United Free Church and a dedicated promoter of temperance. He joined Partick Town Council in November 1903 on that platform. By 1978 it was still a "dry" area.

The park was formally opened by the Provost of Partick, Sir Andrew McLean on 2 July 1887. The arboretum section of the park was originally designed as an educational facility. During the 1960s, a large section of the park was removed in order to make way for the approach roads to the Clyde Tunnel and Expressway.

== Events ==
Victoria Park plays host to several events such as the Whiteinch Fair Festival and the Indian Summer music festival. The park is also home to the Victoria Cricket and Hyndland RFC rugby club. Throughout the summer, the Countryside Rangers arrange walks to educate children about the environment. The park is now home to the fledgling Scottish Australian Rules Football League clubs, the Glasgow Sharks and the Glasgow Magpies and is understood to be the UK's only dedicated Australian Rules Football ground. It is also the home ground of the Glasgow Centurions Touch Rugby Club. The park also hosts a 5 km parkrun every Saturday and a 2 km junior parkrun every Sunday.

== Travel ==
- Rail - There are stations at Hyndland and Jordanhill, both of which are approximately a fifteen-minute walk away.
- Bus - Several routes operate from Glasgow city centre to Dumbarton Road, Crow Road and Victoria Park Drive North. All of these are within five minutes walk from the park gates.
- Car - There is some parking around the park perimeter, in particular along Victoria Park Drive North.

== Television ==
The park featured in the Scottish sitcom Still Game in the episode 'Hot Seat'. The programme features views of the park and scenes of the surrounding area.

The park is also featured in Limmy's Show, in a sketch in which Limmy bemoans the poor state of the railings around the park.
