= John Burns Brooksby =

British veterinary virologist

John Burns Brooksby CBE FRS FRSE
- Born: 25 December 1914 (age 111); Hyndland, Glasgow, Scotland
- Died: 17 December 1998 (aged 83); Swaffham Bulbeck, U.K.
- Education: London University
- Known for: Developing a methodology for diagnosing and typing foot-and-mouth disease
- Spouse: Muriel Weir (m. 1940)
- Medical career
- Profession: Veterinarian
- Institutions: Foot-and-Mouth Research Institute
- Sub-specialties: Animal physiologist and virologist

John Burns Brooksby CBE FRS FRSE (25 December 1914 – 17 December 1998) was a Scottish veterinarian, animal physiologist and veterinary virologist. He was a recognised expert on serology and especially foot-and-mouth disease, and identified and categorised the majority of its known forms. His advice was taken on an international level, and he played a significant role in disease control in Africa and the Middle East.

He was responsible for the control of the spread of this disease at international level.

== Personal life ==
He was born on 25 December 1914 to Elizabeth Brodie Burns and George B. Brooksby, an organ-builder, in Hyndland, Glasgow. His mother was from a family of Renfrewshire farmers and he visited his uncles' farms who engendered in him a love of animals.

Brooksby married Muriel Weir, one of his Glasgow students, on 18 December 1940. They had two children.

He had developed a keen love of art from his mother and was a member of the Farnham Art Society, selling several pictures. On retiring he moved to Cambridgeshire with his wife where he joined a painting class in Grantchester and exhibited there. He was also a keen golfer and gardener.

Brooksby died on 17 December 1998 at Swaffham Bulbeck near Cambridge.

== Education and career ==
Brooksby attended Hyndland Secondary School in Glasgow and then the Glasgow Veterinary College. He then completed a BSc in Veterinary Science at London University while lecturing in histology at the college.

In 1936, he decided on a career in animal physiology and received a grant to study for three years. He studied at three separate centres of excellence on consecutive years: University College, London; McGill University in Montreal in Canada; and the University of Edinburgh under Professor Francis Albert Eley Crew. However, once complete in 1939, his preferred field of animal reproduction offered no employment opportunities and instead he joined the Foot-and-Mouth Research Institute at Pirbright.

He developed a methodology for diagnosing and typing foot-and-mouth disease which was thereafter adopted worldwide. Following a widespread epidemic in Mexico he developed an effective vaccination against the disease. His studies included the survival of the virus in meat, concluding that the virus made use of the animal meat non-viable, a major contributor to the widespread fear of the disease now felt in the farming community.

Brooksby became deputy director of the Pirbright Institute in 1957, and took complete control as Director in 1964. He served as Director for 16 years. During this time he worked particularly on vaccines and further study on the potential for airborne spread of the disease. His research also extended into African swine fever and blue tongue viruses. He prepared the UK for an epidemic of swine vesicular disease, stemming from Italy and Hong Kong and halted it in its tracks in 1972 due to appropriate immunisation.

He was elected a 17n17 in 1968 and a Fellow of the Royal Society in 1970.

In 1973, he was made a Commander of the Order of the British Empire.

== Publications ==
- Henderson, W.M; Brooksby, J.B. (December 1948). "The survival of foot-and-mouth disease virus in meat and offal". The Journal of Hygiene. 46 (4): 394–402. doi:10.1017/s0022172400036561. PMC 2235151. PMID 18129316.
- Brooksby, J.B. (1949). The antibodies in foot-and-mouth disease. Report No. 9. Agricultural Research Council. pp. 55–58. OCLC 630166920.
- Rice, Christine E.; Brooksby, J.B. (November 1953). "Studies of the complement-fixation reaction in virus systems. V. In foot and mouth disease using direct and indirect methods". Journal of Immunology. 71 (5): 300–10. doi:10.4049/jimmunol.71.5.300. PMID 13118165. S2CID 20345175.
- Brooksby, J.B. (10 April 2008) [1958]. "The virus of foot-and-mouth disease". Advances in Virus Research. 5: 1–37. doi:10.1016/s0065-3527(08)60670-3. ISBN 9780120398058. PMID 13508401.
