= Alan Dimmick =

Scottish photographer

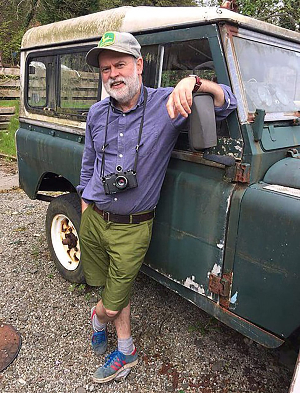
- Alan Dimmick in 2018.
- Born: Alan John Dimmick; 2 June 1961 (age 65); Glasgow, Scotland
- Education: College of Building and Printing
- Known for: Photography
- Website: alandimmick.com

Alan Dimmick (born 2 June 1961) is a Scottish photographer living and working in Glasgow. He is best known for documenting the Glasgow art scene.

== Early life ==
Dimmick was born in Glasgow in 1961, and was named after astronaut Alan Shepard. He attended Hyndland Secondary School between 1973 and 1979 and the College of Building and Printing, now part of City of Glasgow College, between 1979 and 1982.

After a short period spent working at the Mitchell Library and the Southern General Hospital where his father was a neuroscientist, Dimmick moved into a flat with rock band Del Amitri, which is where his work of documenting the art and music scene began. He was also encouraged by Scottish photographer Oscar Marzaroli.

== Work ==
Some of Dimmick's early works were purchased by the People's Palace in Glasgow and the Scottish Arts Council in the 1980s, and he exhibited in group shows at the Collins Gallery in Glasgow, the Pier Arts Centre in Stromness, and the Inverness Museum and Art Gallery. He was a member of the Glasgow Photography Group, which became Street Level Photoworks in 1989.

In 2007, an exhibition of his work was shown at Street Level Photoworks and in 2012, his work documenting the Glasgow art scene was shown at the Gallery of Modern Art.

In 2017, a forty-year retrospective was held at the Stills Gallery in Edinburgh. The exhibition was followed by the publication of Alan Dimmick Photographs 1977–2017, with a launch event hosted by Timorous Beasties. In the same year, he was Artist in Residence at Stirling University.

In 2022, a series of Dimmick's Glasgow photographs were displayed in a citywide outdoor exhibition. In the same year, there was also a display of his work at the Queen Elizabeth University Hospital as part of an NHS Greater Glasgow and Clyde project to "animate public spaces." In 2023, four of his photographs of Millport were included in an exhibition about Glasgow Fair at the Scottish Maritime Museum.

Dimmick describes his composition style as "instinctive," but has cited as early influences Oscar Marzaroli's black-and-white portraits of Joan Eardley in her studio, the work of Robert Frank, and Roger Mayne's pictures of post-war, working-class Londoners.

== Personal life ==
Dimmick's interests, often present in his work, include 1950s Americana, birdwatching and ham radio.

== Solo shows ==
- 2007 Street Level Photoworks, Glasgow
- 2012 Gallery of Modern Art, Glasgow
- 2017 Stills Gallery, Edinburgh
- 2019 SWG3, Glasgow
- 2020 Stirling University
- 2025 Garrison Museum of the Cumbraes, Millport
- 2026 Platform, Glasgow

== Collections ==
Alan Dimmick's work is held by the National Galleries of Scotland and Glasgow School of Art.

== Books ==
- Alan Dimmick Photographs 1977–2017 (2018) ISBN 978-0-906458-09-9
- Island Record (2026) ISBN 978-1-910631-95-9

== Gallery ==
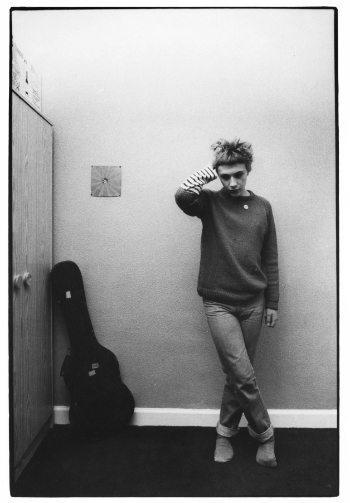
Stephen Pastel, 1982.

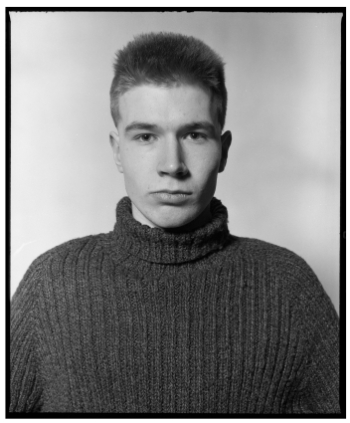
Justin Currie, 1984.

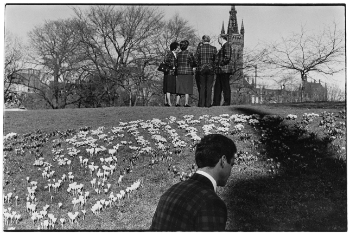
Kelvingrove, 1984.

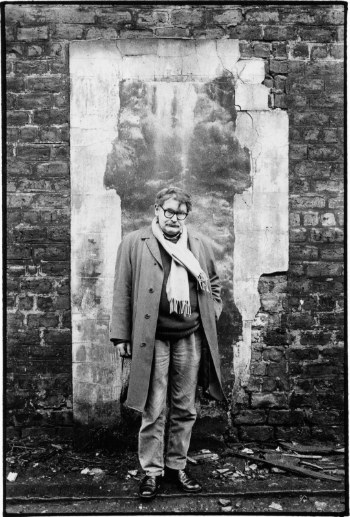
Alasdair Gray, 1985.

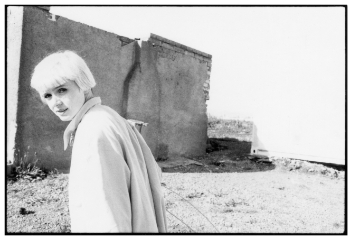
Julie, 1987.

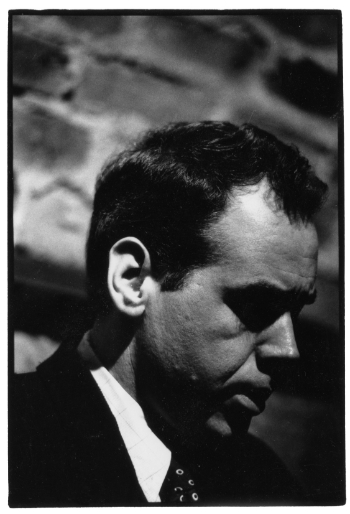
Bret Easton Ellis, The Arches, 1998.

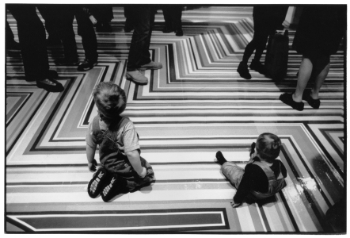
Jim Lambie exhibition, Transmission, 1999.

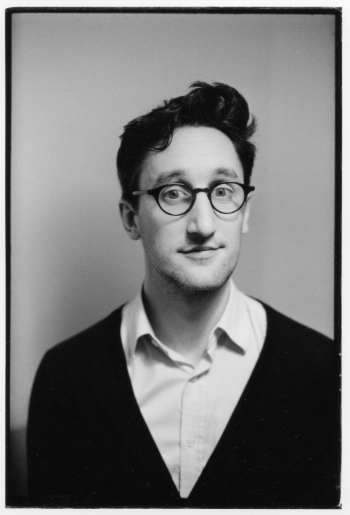
Robert Wringham, 2015.
