= Broomhill Parish Church =

- Broomhill Hyndland Parish Church
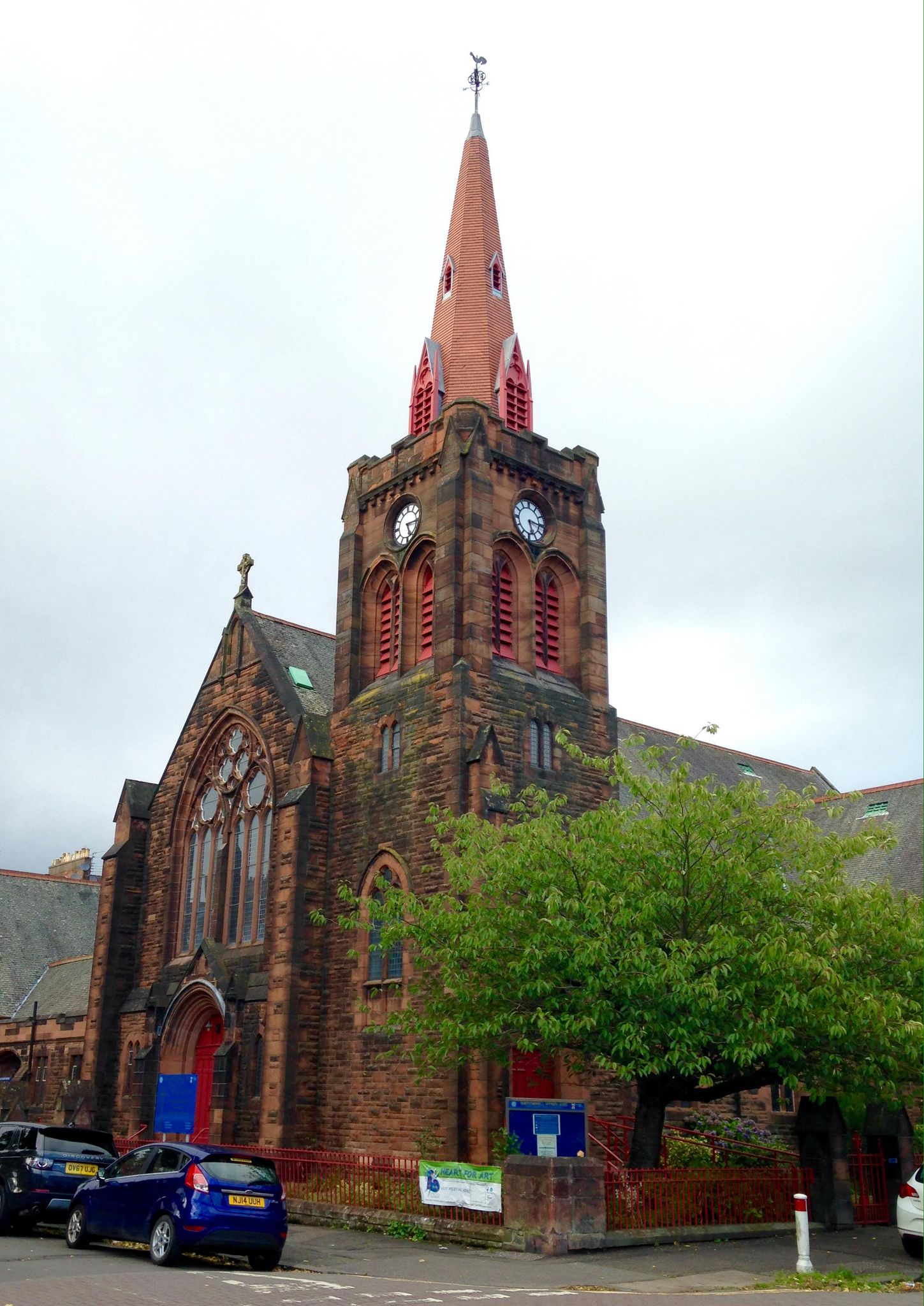
- Broomhill Parish Church
- 55°52′41″N 4°19′14″W
- Location: Glasgow
- Country: Scotland
- Denomination: Church of Scotland
- Website: Parish Website

History
- Former name: Broomhill United Free Church
- Status: Active

Architecture
- Functional status: Parish church
- Architect(s): Stewart & Paterson
- Architectural type: Cruciform Church
- Style: Neo-Gothic
- Years built: 1902–1905

Administration
- Parish: Broomhill Hyndland

Listed Building – Category C(S)
- Designated: 10 July 1989
- Reference no.: LB32296

Broomhill Parish Church, nowadays known as Broomhill Hyndland Parish Church, is a 20th-century church building located in the Broomhill area of Glasgow, Scotland.

== History ==
The church was founded as the Broomhill United Free Church and became Broomhill Parish Church in 1929, after becoming part of the Church of Scotland. It was built using red sandstone church between 1902 and 1905. The church hall was built in 1899. The plans were designed by Stewart & Paterson in the Neo-Gothic cruciform style. A tower was built with a spire in the south west corner.

In 2017, Hyndland Parish Church was united with Broomhill Parish Church to form Broomhill Hyndland Parish Church, with the Broomhill building serving as the main place of worship.

== Works of Arts ==
The church also includes a number of stained glass windows by Guthrie & Wells, Abbey Studio of Edinburgh and Brian Hutchison. The pipe organ was refurbished by Harrison & Harrison in 1997.
