= Balshagray Victoria Park Church =

- Balshagray Victoria Park Parish Church
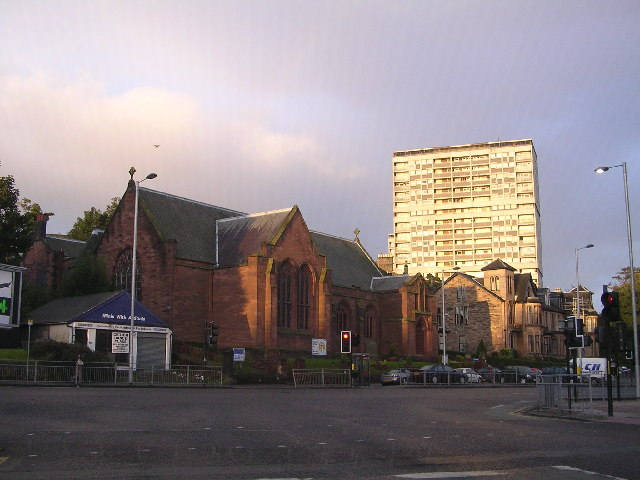
- Balshagray Victoria Park Church
- 55°52′32″N 4°19′13″W
- Location: Glasgow
- Country: Scotland
- Denomination: Church of Scotland
- Website: Church Website

History
- Former name: Balshagray Parish Church
- Status: Active
- Dedicated: 11 September 1909

Architecture
- Functional status: Parish church
- Architect(s): Stewart & Paterson
- Architectural type: Cruciform Church
- Style: Neo-Gothic
- Years built: 1908-1909
- Groundbreaking: 30 May 1908

Listed Building – Category B
- Designated: 15 December 1970
- Reference no.: LB33973

Balshagray Victoria Park Church is a Parish church of the Church of Scotland located in the Broomhill area of Glasgow, Scotland.

== History ==
The church building was designed by Stewart and Paterson in the Neo-Gothic style, and was built between 1908 and 1909, with the foundation stone being laid on 30 May 1908. It was built in a cruciform, using Snecked red sandstone ashlar.

== Stained glass ==
The church includes a number of memorial stained glass windows, including one to the Fallen of WWI in the chancel, and another to the Scottish Industries by Sadie McLellan dating from 1950, among others.

== Congregation ==
In 1991, the congregation of Victoria Park parish Church united with that of Balshagray Parish Church, forming the Balshagray Victoria Park congregation, whilst retaining use of the Balshagray Church building. The 'New' Victoria Park Church building was demolished in 1993, the old church having been demolished in the 1960s to make way for the Clyde Tunnel.
