= Hyndland railway station =

Railway station in Glasgow, Scotland

Hyndland
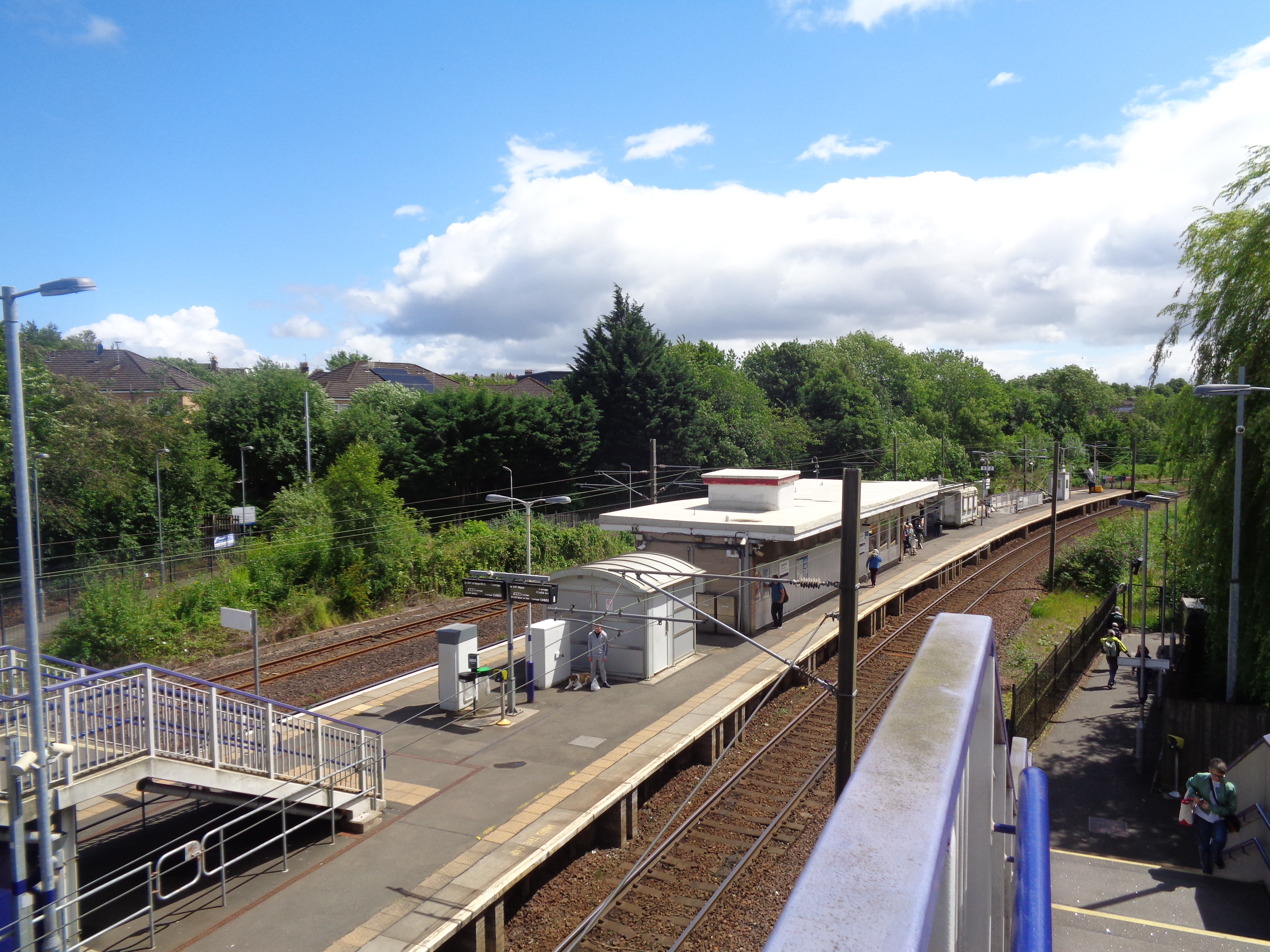
- View south towards Partick

General information
- Location: Hyndland, Glasgow; Scotland
- Coordinates: 55.8796°N 4.3145°W
- Grid reference: NS553675
- Manager: ScotRail
- Transit authority: SPT
- Platforms: 2

Other information
- Station code: HYN
- Fare zone: 1

Key dates
- 5 November 1960: Opened

Passengers
- 2021/22: ▲0.830 million
- Interchange: ▲0.304 million
- 2022/23: ▲1.023 million
- Interchange: ▲0.699 million
- 2023/24: ▲1.304 million
- Interchange: ▲0.926 million
- 2024/25: ▲1.390 million
- Interchange: ▲0.990 million
- 2025/26: ▲1.434 million
- Interchange: ▲1.033 million
Location
Notes
- Passenger statistics from the Office of Rail and Road

Hyndland railway station serves Hyndland in Glasgow, Scotland. The station is 3 1/4 miles (5.2 km) west of Glasgow Central and 2 3/4 miles (4.4 km) west of Glasgow Queen Street on the Argyle and North Clyde Lines. It is managed by ScotRail.

The station was opened by British Railways as part of the electrification of the North Clyde Lines on 5 November 1960. It replaced the original Hyndland station, which had been opened in 1886 on Hyndland Road near Hyndland Parish Church, then under construction. The original station was at the end of a short branch line from Partickhill, the junction being a little on the Partick side of the new station. The branch was subsequently adapted for use as an EMU maintenance depot, but eventually closed in 1987. The branch has since been lifted and the site redeveloped.

The lines of the old Lanarkshire and Dunbartonshire Railway (now closed) passed under the east end of the station in a tunnel adjacent to their Crow Road station. Immediately to the west of the station is Hyndland East Junction where the Yoker and Singer (including the Milngavie branch) lines diverge.

Hyndland station is accessible from the surrounding areas of Hyndland, Broomhill and Hughenden and also serves the nearby Gartnavel General Hospital, Gartnavel Royal Hospital and Glasgow Homoeopathic Hospital.

A ceramic mural called "Wonderful Trains" by the children of Hyndland Secondary School marks the station's entrance tunnel. It was commissioned to celebrate Glasgow's year as European City of Culture in 1990.

In 2017, a local domestic cat became associated with the station.

== Services ==
Hyndland station is on a busy section of the Strathclyde rail network, served by all services on the Argyle Line and North Clyde Line.

Preceding station	National Rail	Following station
Partick	ScotRail; Argyle Line	Jordanhill
Partick	ScotRail; Argyle Line	Anniesland
Partick	ScotRail; North Clyde Line	Jordanhill
Partick	ScotRail; North Clyde Line	Anniesland

=== 2014/15 (From 9 December 2014) ===
There are a total of 14 trains per hour, off-peak (daytime), in each direction.

- 2 tph Airdrie to and from Balloch, via Singer
- 2 tph Cumbernauld to and from Dalmuir, via Yoker
- 2 tph Edinburgh Waverley to and from Milngavie (limited stop)
- 2 tph Edinburgh Waverley to and from Helensburgh Central (limited stop)
- 2 tph Larkhall to Dalmuir, via Singer
- 2 tph Dalmuir to Larkhall, via Yoker
- 2 tph Motherwell to Dalmuir, via Hamilton Central and Yoker (one of which starts back from Cumbernauld and runs via Coatbridge Central)
- 2 tph Milngavie to Motherwell, via Hamilton (alternate trains continuing to Cumbernauld)
- 2 tph Whifflet to Milngavie (alternate trains starting back from Motherwell)
- 2 tph Dalmuir to Whifflet, via Singer (alternate trains continuing to Motherwell)

In the evenings, services on the Argyle line continue to run as above, but the North Clyde line is reduced to:

- 2 tph Cumbernauld to and from Balloch, via Singer
- 2 tph Edinburgh Waverley to and from Helensburgh Central, via Yoker

On Sundays, there is a simplified service pattern in operation with half-hourly services on the following routes:

- Helensburgh Central to and from Edinburgh Waverley via Singer
- Balloch to and from Rutherglen via Yoker (services on this route then proceed alternately to Motherwell via Whifflet or to Larkhall)
- Milngavie to and from Motherwell via Hamilton.

There is no direct service to Springburn or Cumbernauld, but connections are available (once per hour) at Partick.

=== 2016 ===
Minor alterations were made to the weekday service pattern at the December 2015 timetable change, notably extending 2 of the Dalmuir via Yoker trains (those from Cumbernauld via Springburn) each way to Dumbarton Central and maintaining the daytime timetable on the North Clyde routes through the evening until end of service (though the Milngavie to Edinburgh service still does not run after 7pm)

== Bibliography ==
Butt, R. V. J. (October 1995). The Directory of Railway Stations: details every public and private passenger station, halt, platform and stopping place, past and present (1st ed.). Sparkford: Patrick Stephens Ltd. ISBN 978-1-85260-508-7. OCLC 60251199. OL 11956311M.
