= Hyndland RFC =

Scottish rugby union club

(Scotland) Hyndland RFC
- Full name: Hyndland Rugby Football Club
- Union: Scottish Rugby Union
- Founded: 1925; 101 years ago
- Location: Scotstoun, Scotland
- Ground: Scotstoun Stadium
- League: West Division Three
- 2019–20: West Division Three. 3rd in Conf 1
Team kit

Hyndland RFC is a rugby union side based in Scotstoun, Glasgow, Scotland.The club was founded in 1925. They play their home games at Scotstoun Stadium.

== History ==
Hyndland RFC has access to training facilities in Glasgow at Scotstoun Stadium, home to Glasgow Warriors. They also use Victoria Park in Scotstoun to train. The club use the Partick Bowling club as a clubhouse. They have a long-standing annual pre-season fixture against Waid Academy F.P. to play for a silver chalice.

== Hyndland Sevens ==
The club host an Under-23 Sevens tournament. The entrants play for the Kurt Lief Cup.

== Honours ==
- Hyndland Sevens
  - Champions: 1961
- Waid Academy F.P. Sevens
  - Champions: 1986
- Strathendrick Sevens
  - Champions: 1987
- Moray Sevens
  - Champions: 1984
