= James David Provins Graham =

Scottish doctor (1914–1989)

James David Provins Graham FRSE FRCPSG FRCPE (8 February 1914 – 16 May 1989) was a Scottish physician, pharmacologist and academic author. He wrote on neurotransmissions in relation to chemical influence, including issues of drug dependence. He established the Welsh Poisons Information Service. In 1973 he sat on the first Committee on the Advisory Council on the Misuse of Drugs. In authorship he standardly appears as J D P Graham.

== Early life ==
He was born in Barrhead in Renfrewshire on 8 February 1914. He was educated at Barrhead High School and Hyndland Secondary School, then studied medicine at Glasgow University and graduated BSc in 1937. He received his doctorate (MD) in 1939.

In the Second World War he was commissioned in March 1941 and later served in the Royal Army Medical Corps in Egypt at the rank of captain, attached to the 8th Army. After the war he was promoted to major, serving at the military hospital at Buchanan Castle in Drymen in Scotland.

== Academic career ==
In 1946 he began lecturing in pharmacology at Glasgow University as an ICI research fellow. In 1948 he moved to the Welsh National School of Medicine in Cardiff as a senior lecturer in pharmacology and toxicology, becoming a professor in 1971.

In 1965 he moved with his wife Ann to Ty Cwm Cottage near Llanthony in the Brecon Beacons National Park.

In 1969 he was elected a Fellow of the Royal Society of Edinburgh. His proposers were William Alexander Bain, George Howard Bell, James Brough and Henry M Adam.

He retired in 1979. He died on 16 May 1989.

== Publications ==
- The Diagnosis and Treatment of Acute Poisoning (1962)
- Pharmacology for Medical Students (1971)
- Cannabis and Health (1976)
- Cannabis Now (1977)
- An Introduction to Human Pharmacology (1979)
