= Joe Germanese =

American soccer player

Personal information
- Date of birth: June 4, 1985 (age 41)
- Place of birth: Saint Louis, Missouri, United States
- Height: 5 ft 10 in (1.78 m)
- Position: Midfielder

Youth career
- 2004–2005: Vanderbilt University
- 2006–2007: Duke University

Senior career*
Years	Team	Apps	(Gls)
2006	Des Moines Menace	13	(4)
2007	Cary RailHawks U23's	15	(2)
2008	New England Revolution	1	(0)
2008	→ Western Mass Pioneers (loan)	2	(0)
- * Club domestic league appearances and goals as of 31 July 2010 ‡ National team caps and goals as of 14 April 2008

Joe Germanese (born June 4, 1985) is an American soccer player.

== Club career ==
Prior to playing professionally, Germanese played for the Duke Blue Devils.

On January 18, 2008, Germanese was selected by the New England Revolution of Major League Soccer 27th-overall in the 2008 MLS SuperDraft. The club signed him to a developmental contract on May 22. Germanese made his full professional debut, and scored his first career goal for Revolution, on July 1, 2008, in a 2008 U.S. Open Cup third-round game against Richmond Kickers. He would score again in the club's 3-1 loss to D.C. United on August 12 in the U.S. Open Cup semifinal.

He made his Major League Soccer league debut on September 6, coming on as a 70th-minute substitute for Sainey Nyassi in a 4-0 loss to the Columbus Crew.

During 2008 Germanese also spent a short spell on loan at USL Second Division side Western Mass Pioneers. The Revolution released him at the end of the 2008 season.
