= Scotstoun Stadium =

Sports venue in Glasgow, Scotland

Coordinates: 55.8811°N 4.3418°W

- The athletics track and main stand with extension during the 2026 Commonwealth Games

- Location within Glasgow council area
- Location: Scotstoun Sports Campus; 72 Danes Drive; Glasgow; G14 9HD
- Owner: Glasgow City Council
- Capacity: 4,765 (permanent); North Stand 1,252; South Stand 3,513. (Capacity: 7,351 using additional temporary seating)
- Surface: Artificial (GreenFields REAL FT Slide Pro)
- Public transit: Scotstounhill railway station Dumbarton Road bus stop (before Harland Street)

Construction
- Opened: 1915; 111 years ago
- Renovated: 2008–2010, 2025–2026
- Cost: £17.5M (2008–10 renovation)
- Architect: Barr

Tenants
- Glasgow Warriors (1997–98, 2012–); Victoria Park City of Glasgow Athletics Club; Scotland (Sevens World Series) (2012–15); Hyndland RFC

Scotstoun Stadium is an athletics and rugby union stadium in Scotstoun, an area in the West End of Glasgow, Scotland.

Glasgow Warriors have trained at the facility since 2009 and have played their home games here from the 2012–13 season onwards. The surface is a World Rugby approved artificial turf which is also suitable for athletics. It has a capacity of 9,708 for rugby union.

Between 2012 and 2015, the Stadium hosted the Scotland Sevens – the Scottish leg of the IRB Sevens World Series, but then the leg was moved to a new host country, France in 2016.

The Stadium hosted the athletics events at the 2026 Commonwealth Games, hosted by Scotland in the city of Glasgow. Temporary seating was positioned around the perimeter of the stadium, increasing the seating capacity to between 10,000-11,000 people.

== History ==
=== Opening ===
The facility first opened in 1915 as Scotstoun Showgrounds after the land was developed by the Glasgow Agricultural Society as a venue for agricultural shows. It was soon being used as a venue for sporting events and as a result the Grandstand was erected. The facility underwent a huge renovation in 2008 and on completion was re-opened on 14 January 2010 by the Princess Royal.

=== Recent history ===
The stadium forms part of the wider Scotstoun Sports Campus which in addition to being a leisure centre open to the public, includes high-quality facilities for racquet sports (hosting the 1997 IBF World Championships, 1997 Sudirman Cup and 2007 Sudirman Cup in badminton, and the table tennis and squash events at the 2014 Commonwealth Games), as well as a swimming pool which was the venue for the Synchronised swimming competition forming part of the multi-sport 2018 European Championships held in Glasgow and Berlin. In September 2018, the venue became the host site for the Murray Trophy – Glasgow, a new indoor hard court event on the ATP Challenger Tour in men's tennis.

=== Renovation ===
Renovations involved building new stadium facilities housing new office space, meeting rooms, an indoor 100-metre sprint track, as well as resurfacing the outdoor 400-metre track with a full size rugby pitch in the in-field. The stands were extended creating a north stand and south stand which together can seat up to 5,000.

2010 also saw the introduction of new synthetic pitches and rugby training pitches located at the far end of the stadium. In addition to these, the stadium has a strength and conditioning suite for athletes.

== Events ==
Scotstoun Stadium was used as a training venue for the 2014 Commonwealth Games and is regularly used for premier athletics events attracting world class athletes from all over the UK. It is expected to host the athletics events of the 2026 Commonwealth Games.

It became the training base for the Glasgow Warriors rugby team in 2009 who subsequently started playing home games at the venue in September 2012, moving from their previous home at Firhill. Scotstoun Stadium first hosted the Scottish leg of the IRB World Sevens Series in May 2012, and continued to host the event until it was moved to France in 2016. It is also the home ground of Hyndland RFC.

Victoria Park City of Glasgow Athletics Club also trains at Scotstoun.

=== 2026 Commonwealth Games ===
The stadium hosted the athletic events at the 2026 Commonwealth Games, hosted by Scotland in the city of Glasgow. Temporary seating was poised around the perimeter of the stadium, increasing the seating capacity to between 10,000-11,000 people. The stadium underwent further works to improve the stadium prior to the games. It served as one of the main stadiums during the duration of the games.
