= Mike Richardson (Scottish cricketer) =

Scottish former cricketer

Personal information
- Full name: Michael Sloan Richardson
- Born: 20 August 1969 (age 57); Glasgow, Lanarkshire, Scotland
- Batting: Right-handed
- Bowling: Right-arm medium

Domestic team information
- Years: Team
- 1992–1994: Scotland

Career statistics
Competition	First-class	List A
Matches	2	1
Runs scored	0	0
Batting average	–	–
100s/50s	–/–	–/–
Top score	–	–
Balls bowled	288	46
Wickets	4	0
Bowling average	39.50	–
5 wickets in innings	–	–
10 wickets in match	–	–
Best bowling	2/41	–
Catches/stumpings	1/–	–/–
- Source: Cricinfo, 27 June 2022

Michael Sloan Richardson (born 20 August 1969) is a Scottish former cricketer.

Richardson was born at Glasgow in August 1969. He was educated at Hyndland Secondary School, before matriculating to the University of Edinburgh. A club cricketer for West of Scotland and Clydesdale, Richardson made his debut for Scotland against Ireland at Dundee in 1992. He played twice more for Scotland in 1994, making a first-class appearance against Ireland at Glasgow, and a List A one-day appearance against Sussex at Hove in the 1994 Benson & Hedges Cup. He took four wickets in first-class cricket, taking two wickets in both matches.
