= Timorous Beasties =

Glaswegian fabrics company

Timorous Beasties is a design-led manufacturing company based in Glasgow that specialises in fabrics and wallpapers. The company was founded in 1990 by Alistair McAuley and Paul Simmons, who met while studying at the Glasgow School of Art. Winners of the Walpole Award for 'Best Emerging British Luxury Brand' in 2007 and 'British Luxury Design Talent' in 2010, the company now has three branded showrooms in Glasgow, London and Berlin and export worldwide.

== Company profile ==
In 2004 Timorous Beasties released their product Glasgow Toile.

As well as their own product range, Timorous Beasties have worked on a number of commissions and collaborations with clients such as Nike, Famous Grouse, Ercol, Brintons Carpets and Penguin Books, across a diverse range of applications including print, packaging, furnishing, interiors and exteriors.

Some of their more recent projects include:

- Fortnum & Mason (November 2014) - Working in collaboration with brand design agency Design Bridge, Timorous Beasties created a range of confectionery box designs for the luxury department store Fortnum & Mason.
- Netjets (June 2015) - Timorous Beasties were commissioned to create a tail-wrap for Netjets' signature series, the Challenger 350 jet, making its debut at ArtBasel, Switzerland.
- Kate Bush (July 2015) - Timorous Beasties were invited to produce the artwork used on the programme and tickets for Kate Bush's first live shows in several decades: a 22-night residency at Hammersmith Apollo entitled 'Before the Dawn'.
- Penguin Books (May 2016) – Timorous Beasties partnered with Vintage Classics to produce a collection of reissues inspired by nature. The collection contained five books each featuring a unique illustrated cover designed by Timorous Beasties.
- Royal Bank of Scotland (May 2016) - In collaboration with Scottish design studios O Street, Graven Images and Stuco, Timorous Beasties produced illustrations for a new series of polymer banknotes for the Royal Bank of Scotland.
- Linn (May 2016) - Timorous Beasties were invited by Linn to provide the designs for the speaker covers for their Series 5 speakers.
- Bowhill House (June 2016) - Opening to public for the first time in 138 years, Timorous Beasties were responsible for the redesign of the historic Smoking Room at Bowhill House: the country home of the Duke and Duchess of Buccleuch.

== Awards ==
- 2013: Winners of the Retail Exterior Surface for Princes Square (Surface Design Awards)
- 2007: Winners of Walpole Award for Best Emerging Brand
- 2006: Elle Decoration Award for Best Textiles
- 2006: Elle Decoration Award for Best Carpet
- 2005: Winners of Scottish Style Award
- 2003: ICFF New York Editors Award for Best Wallcovering
- 2001: ICFF New York Editors Award for Best Fabrics
- 1999: Millennium Award for Laminates
- 1998: ICFF New York Editors Award for Best Wallcovering

== Collections ==
- Art Institute of Chicago, US
- Cooper Hewitt Museum, New York, US
- Decorative Art Collection, Hampshire County Council, UK
- GOMA, Glasgow, UK
- Royal Ontario Museum, Toronto, Canada
- Temple Newsam, Leeds, UK
- Victoria and Albert Museum, UK
