= Larry Mark =

American soccer player

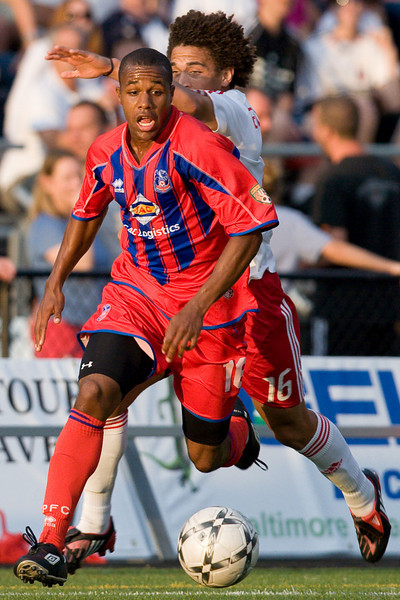

Personal information
- Date of birth: August 8, 1985 (age 41)
- Place of birth: Ann Arbor, Michigan, U.S.
- Height: 5 ft 9 in (1.75 m)
- Positions: Midfielder; forward

Youth career
- 2003–2004: Rutgers Scarlet Knights
- 2005–2006: American University Eagles

Senior career*
| Years | Team | Apps | (Gls) |
| 2007–2010 | Crystal Palace Baltimore | 27 | (4) |
- * Club domestic league appearances and goals as of September 25, 2010

Larry Mark (born August 8, 1985) is an American former soccer player.

== Career ==
=== College ===
Mark attended DeMatha Catholic High School, and played his first two years of college soccer at Rutgers University before transferring to American University as a junior. He finished his Eagles career with 11 goals and 7 assists in 37 matches.

=== Professional ===
Mark turned professional with Crystal Palace Baltimore in the USL Second Division in 2007, and made his professional debut on May 5, 2007, as a substitute in a 1–0 loss to the Cincinnati Kings.

== Career statistics ==
(correct as of September 26, 2010)

| Club | Season | League | | | Cup | | | Play-Offs | | | Total | | |
| Club | Season | Apps | Goals | Assists | Apps | Goals | Assists | Apps | Goals | Assists | Apps | Goals | Assists |
|---|---|---|---|---|---|---|---|---|---|---|---|---|---|
| Crystal Palace Baltimore | 2007 | 9 | 1 | 0 | 1 | 0 | 0 | - | - | - | 10 | 1 | 0 |
| Crystal Palace Baltimore | 2008 | 12 | 3 | 1 | 4 | 0 | 0 | 2 | 0 | 0 | 18 | 3 | 1 |
| Crystal Palace Baltimore | 2009 | 1 | 0 | 0 | 0 | 0 | 0 | 0 | 0 | 0 | 1 | 0 | 0 |
| Crystal Palace Baltimore | 2010 | 5 | 0 | 0 | 0 | 0 | 0 | 0 | 0 | 0 | 5 | 0 | 0 |
| Total | 2007–2010 | 27 | 4 | 1 | 5 | 0 | 0 | 2 | 0 | 0 | 34 | 4 | 1 |
