= Darren Spicer =

American soccer player (born 1983)

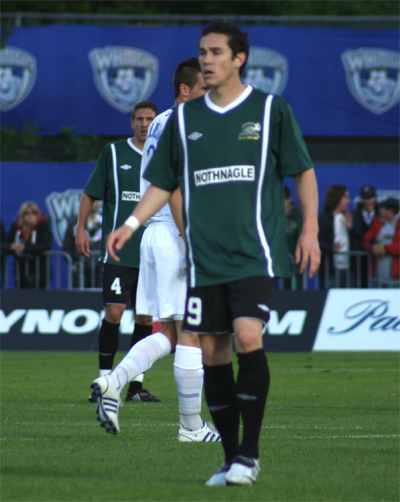
- Spicer in 2010

Personal information
- Full name: Darren Spicer
- Date of birth: August 27, 1983 (age 43)
- Place of birth: Upland, California, United States
- Height: 5 ft 11 in (1.80 m)
- Position: Midfielder

Youth career
- 2002–2005: Princeton Tigers

Senior career*
| Years | Team | Apps | (Gls) |
| 2006 | Chivas USA | 0 | (0) |
| 2006–2007 | Brinkumer SV | | (4) |
| 2007 | Minnesota Thunder | 17 | (2) |
| 2008–2009 | Charleston Battery | 53 | (6) |
| 2010 | Rochester Rhinos | 25 | (0) |
- * Club domestic league appearances and goals

Darren Spicer (born August 27, 1983) is an American former professional soccer player who played as a midfielder.

== Career ==
=== Youth and college ===
Spicer attended Diamond Bar High School in Diamond Bar, California, played club soccer with the Newport Slammers, and played college soccer at Princeton University from 2002 to 2005. Spicer was a first team all Ivy League selection in 2004 and 2005 and Ivy League Player of the Year in 2004. He also received NSCAA first team all region honors in 2004 and 2005. He captained the team his senior year and finished his career as a Tiger with 26 goals. He graduated in 2006 with a bachelor's degree in international politics.

=== Professional ===
Spicer was drafted in the second round (13th overall) of the 2006 MLS Supplemental Draft by Chivas USA. He never appeared in a first team game, playing three games with the Chivas Reserves before leaving the club to go play abroad in Germany.

In the fall of 2006, Spicer signed with Brinkumer SV of the Oberliga Nord. He made his debut in October 2006, going on to score eight goals, but he left the team after it began experiencing financial difficulties. On May 15, 2007, Spicer signed with the Minnesota Thunder of the USL First Division After one season in Minnesota, he moved to the Charleston Battery, signing with them on February 8, 2008. Spicer played two seasons in Charleston, scoring 10 goals (in all competitions) in 66 appearances with the club. He led the team in scoring in Open Cup play en route to the Open Cup final in 2008. Spicer left Charleston when the club decided to move down to USL Second Division after the end of the 2009 season.

Spicer joined USSF Division 2 club Rochester Rhinos on February 18, 2010. After an injury early in the season, he appeared in 25 matches and helped the team to the best record in USSF Division 2 in 2010. Spicer left the club after one season and is no longer playing.

== Honors ==
Rochester Rhinos

- USSF Division 2 Pro League Regular Season Champions: 2010
