= Hyndland Parish Church =

- The Kingsborough Sanctuary
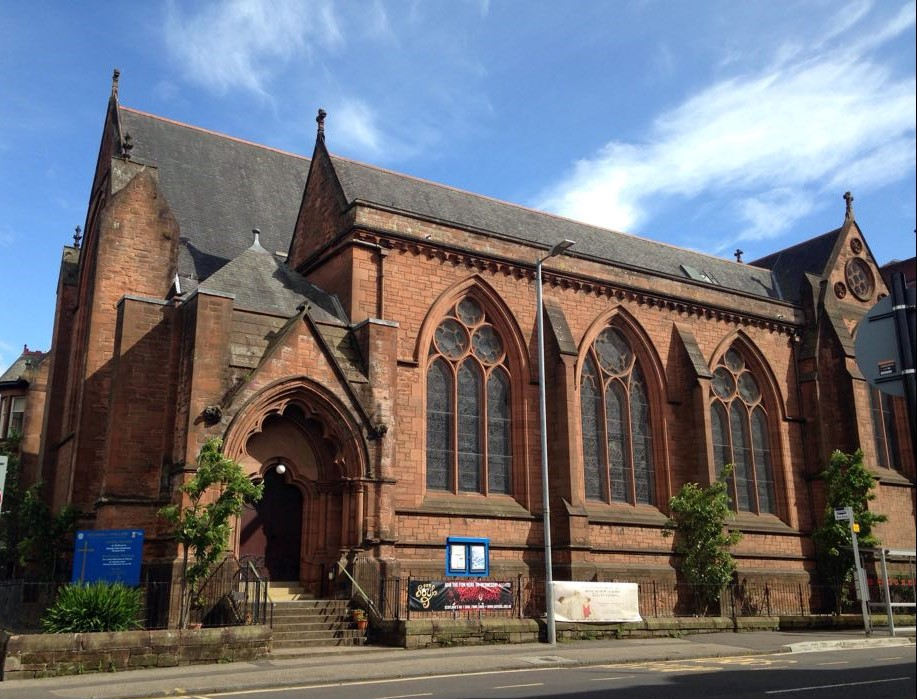
- The church in 2020
- Hyndland Parish Church
- 55°52′44″N 4°18′20″W
- Location: Glasgow
- Country: Scotland
- Denomination: Church of Scotland
- Website: Parish Website

History
- Status: Active
- Founded: 1886

Architecture
- Functional status: Parish church
- Architect: William Leiper
- Architectural type: Cruciform Church
- Style: Neo-Gothic
- Years built: 1886–1887

Administration
- Parish: Broomhill Hyndland

Listed Building – Category A
- Designated: 15 December 1970
- Reference no.: LB32532

Hyndland Parish Church also known as The Kingsborough Sanctuary, is a 19th-century church located in the Hyndland area of Glasgow.

== History ==
Hyndland Parish Church was founded with the development of the Hyndland area into residential living in the late 1800s. The original church consisted of a tin church which stood directly opposite the site of the present church. The current church was built in the Neo-Gothic style, on designs by William Leiper, and was built between 1886 and 1887. It was built in a cruciform, with a nave, aisles, transepts and chancel. The church's banquet hall was rented by Belle and Sebastian as a rehearsal space in the 1990s. Their single Lazy Line Painter Jane was recorded there in early 1997.

In 2017, Hyndland Parish Church was united with Broomhill Parish Church to form Broomhill Hyndland Parish Church, with the Broomhill building serving as the main place of worship. Hyndland Parish Church was renamed The Kingsborough Sanctuary and today also serves as a concert hall, in addition to being a place of worship.

== Works of Art ==
The church contains an original 1887 Henry Willis organ which consists of three manuals and thirty one speaking stops. The church also possess a notable collection of stained glass windows by Norman Macdougall (1889), Douglas Strachan (1921), Douglas Hamilton (1930), Gordon Webster (1961), William Wilson (1962), Sax Shaw (1968), Paul Lucky (1984) and Rab MacInnes (1999). There are also another three windows by Oscar Paterson made in 1897 which were installed in the church after being moved from the now demolished St Bride's Church, in Partick.
