= Brett Wiesner =

American soccer player

Personal information
- Full name: Brett Valenciano Wiesner
- Date of birth: May 12, 1983
- Place of birth: St. Louis Park, Minnesota, United States
- Date of death: July 5, 2014 (aged 31)
- Place of death: Oconomowoc Lake, Wisconsin, United States
- Height: 1.80 m (5 ft 11 in)
- Position: Forward

College career
Years	Team	Apps	(Gls)
2001–2004	Washington Huskies		

Senior career*
Years	Team	Apps	(Gls)
2005	Seattle Sounders	11	(0)
2005–2011	Milwaukee Wave (indoor)	105	(34)
2008	Harrisburg City Islanders	18	(4)

International career
2002	United States U20	1	(0)
2008	United States Futsal		
- * Club domestic league appearances and goals

Brett Valenciano Wiesner (May 12, 1983 – July 5, 2014) was an American soccer player.

He spent his career with the Seattle Sounders in the USL First Division, the Harrisburg City Islanders in the USL Second Division and also played indoor soccer with Milwaukee Wave.

Wiesner also played on several US Youth National Teams, and was a starter for the Americans in the 2008 FIFA Futsal World Cup in Brasil.

Wiesner drowned in Oconomowoc Lake while swimming with friends early in the morning on July 5, 2014.
