= Jordanhill railway station =

Railway station in Glasgow, Scotland

Jordanhill Scottish Gaelic: Cnoc Iòrdain
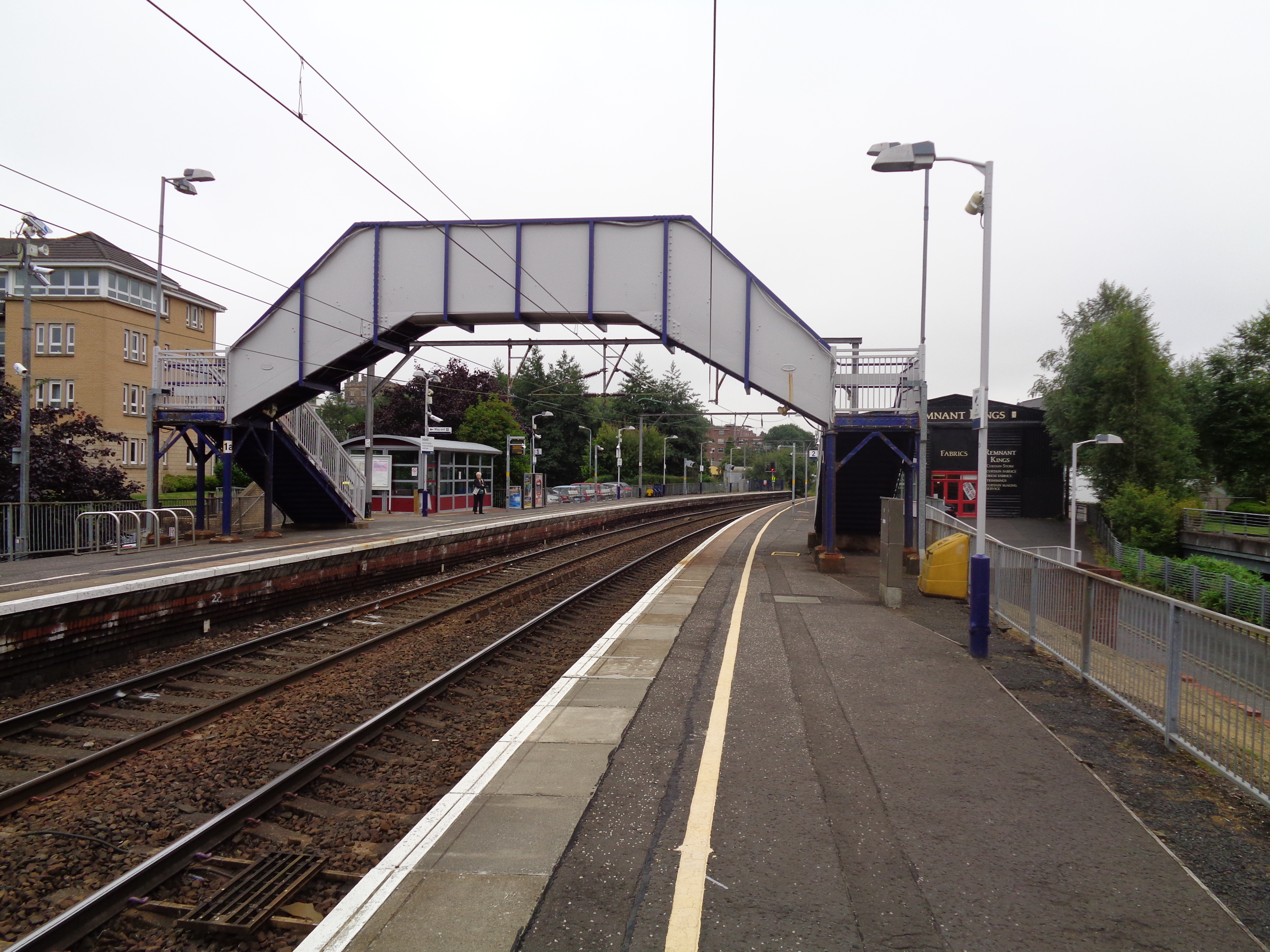

General information
- Location: Jordanhill, Glasgow; Scotland
- Coordinates: 55.8826°N 4.3246°W
- Grid reference: NS546679
- Manager: ScotRail
- Transit authority: SPT
- Platforms: 2

Other information
- Station code: JOR

History
- Opened: 1 August 1887

Passengers
- 2021/22: ▲0.139 million
- 2022/23: ▲0.192 million
- 2023/24: ▲0.240 million
- 2024/25: ▲0.264 million
- 2025/26: ▲0.284 million
Location
- Location within Glasgow council area
Notes
- Passenger statistics from the Office of Rail and Road

Jordanhill railway station is a side-platformed suburban railway station in the Jordanhill area in the West End of Glasgow, Scotland. The station, which is governed by Transport Scotland and managed by ScotRail, lies on the Argyle Line and the North Clyde Line. It is 12 chains (240 metres) from Hyndland West Junction and approximately four miles (six kilometres) from Glasgow City Centre. It has received international recognition for being the subject of the millionth article on the English Wikipedia.

== History ==
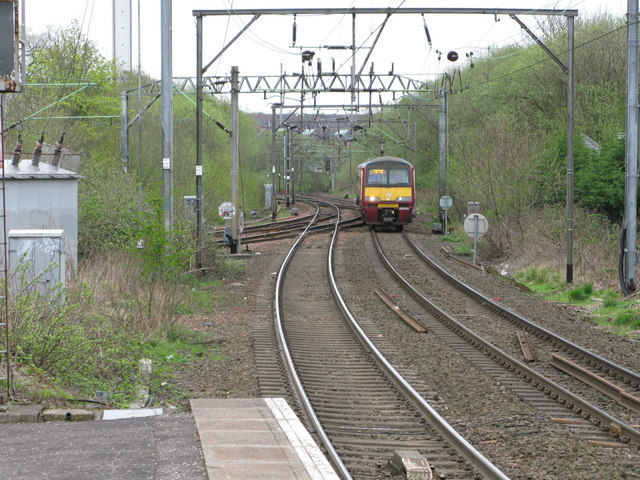
Hyndland West Junction, to the east of the station. The lines diverging to the left continue to Anniesland

=== Early history ===
The station opened on 1 August 1887 as part of the Glasgow, Yoker and Clydebank Railway. Construction of the station structure was not completed until 1895, with modular-design wooden buildings, commonly seen on the new suburban railway lines, being built on both platforms. This is an important part of the station's history. The station is located on part of the former site of brick and tile works; Jordanhill being an area of artisans and miners until the close of the nineteenth century. The railway station arrived just as much of the local industry was declining, giving residents, who previously had to walk to Hillhead or Partick to find transport into Glasgow, proper access to the city centre.

=== Accidents and incidents ===
- On 15 January 1898, J. Johnstone, a member of the Whiteinch Harriers running club, was killed while attempting to run across the line west of the station. A small lead memorial stood on the spot for many years.
- The freight line saw near-disaster on 28 December 1932, when seventeen wagons laden with coal ran away on a slight incline on the sidings operated by the Great Western Steam Laundry; they ran into other wagons, derailing nine and spilling coal over the line, seriously disrupting passenger traffic.
- A serious accident occurred on 28 April 1980, when a three-coach train carrying 80 passengers from Dalmuir to Motherwell derailed at Hyndland West Junction, just after leaving Jordanhill. All the bogies on the leading coach left the rails, causing fifteen people (nine women and six men) to be injured seriously enough for them to be taken to the Western Infirmary.

=== Plans for rebuilding ===
In 1998, Strathclyde Passenger Transport Authority (SPTA) undertook a study into the possible relocation of the station west to Westbrae Drive. By 2004, SPT had identified this station as one of their top three priorities, and Glasgow City Council had identified it as a "main priority".

An alternative proposal would keep the existing station open but with many services calling only at a new Westbrae Drive station. This proposal was backed in August 2001 by Charlie Gordon, then leader of Glasgow City Council, who said that having a second station in Jordanhill would assist students at the nearby Jordanhill campus of the University of Strathclyde. The proposed new station would have been only roughly 500 yards (450 metres) away. The station at Jordanhill was to be rebuilt, one of six new stations in the west of Scotland, according to an announcement made on 19 May 2006 by SPT chief executive Ron Culley.

Jordanhill Station was rebuilt, but not moved, for the 2014 Commonwealth Games, one of a number of stations modernised for the Commonwealth Games through a £300 million transport legacy plan.

== Facilities ==
The station has a small car park with eleven spaces and is not permanently staffed. Both platforms are elevated and each has a wheelchair ramp. There is a connecting footbridge between the two platforms, as well as a ticket machine, a car park, waiting shelters and cycle spaces.

== Passenger volume ==
Passenger volume at Jordanhill per twelve month periods beginning in April
Year	Entries and exits
2002–2003	180,474
2004–2005	281,031
2005–2006	331,002
2006–2007	344,047
2007–2008	346,823
2008–2009	391,684
2009–2010	373,478
2010–2011	377,328
2011–2012	390,614
2012–2013	332,508
2013–2014	296,300
2014–2015	304,130
2015–2016	312,526
2016–2017	285,794
2017–2018	304,292
2018–2019	295,446
2019–2020	292,156
2020–2021	41,128
2021–2022	139,172
2022–2023	191,552

In SRA's 2002/2003 financial year, 85,861 people boarded trains at Jordanhill station, and 94,613 disembarked, making it the 1,029th busiest station in the United Kingdom, and twenty-fifth busiest on the Argyle Line in 2003.

== Services ==
As part of the Argyle Line, the station is used—along with Glasgow Central and Anderston—by those commuting to and from Central Glasgow, near the heart of its business and financial district. The typical hourly service from the station is four trains per hour to Dalmuir via Yoker (two extended to Dumbarton Central), two trains to Whifflet via Glasgow Central and two trains to Cumbernauld via Glasgow Queen Street.

In 2016, the Queen Street High Level tunnel closure saw restricted services for part of the year, with frequencies dropping to half-hourly from here.

Preceding station	National Rail	Following station
Hyndland	ScotRail; Argyle Line	Scotstounhill
Hyndland	ScotRail; North Clyde Line	Scotstounhill

== Wikipedia coverage ==
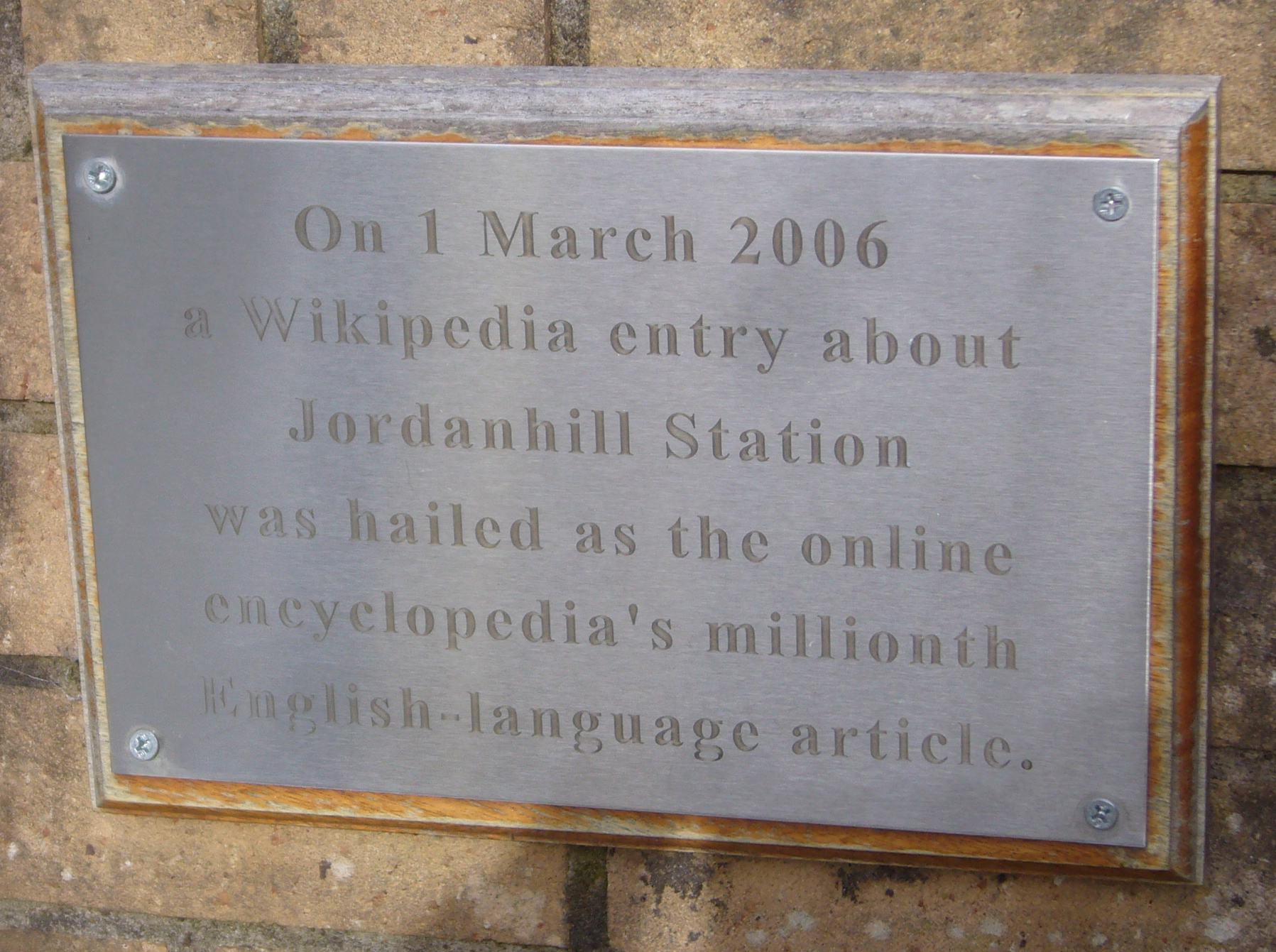
A plaque commemorating the Wikipedia article about the station being celebrated as the millionth created on the site

On 1 March 2006 an English Wikipedia article about the station was created by Ewan Macdonald, a Wikipedian known on the site as Nach0King. This article was recognised as being the millionth article created on the site. Macdonald said that he was "delighted" to be the one who made the millionth article. Wikipedia's founder, Jimmy Wales, said in a press release that he is "thrilled" that the station was the topic of the site's millionth article, saying "This is not something that would appear in a traditional encyclopedia, and it shows how Wikipedia reflects the needs and interests of people everywhere, and not just the dictates of what academics and cultural mavens claim is worthy of an encyclopedia."
