= Mike Richardson (soccer) =

American soccer player

Personal information
- Full name: Michael Richardson
- Date of birth: September 2, 1985 (age 41)
- Place of birth: Dobson, North Carolina, U.S.
- Height: 5 ft 11 in (1.80 m)
- Position: Midfielder

Youth career
- 2004–2006: UNC Greensboro

Senior career*
Years	Team	Apps	(Gls)
2007–2008	Charleston Battery	50	(1)
- * Club domestic league appearances and goals

Michael Richardson (born September 2, 1985) is an American former professional soccer player who played as a midfielder.

== Career ==
After attending UNC Greensboro, Richardson spent two seasons with the Charleston Battery, appearing in 50 matches, scoring one goal.
