= Léo Inácio =

Brazilian footballer

Personal information
- Full name: Leonardo Inácio Raphael Nunes
- Date of birth: September 14, 1976 (age 50)
- Place of birth: Rio de Janeiro, Brazil
- Height: 5 ft 9 in (1.75 m)
- Position: Midfielder

Senior career*
Years	Team	Apps	(Gls)
1995–2000	Flamengo	50	(2)
1997	→ Coritiba (loan)	4	(0)
2001–2002	Botafogo	48	(3)
2002	Juventude	11	(1)
2003	Fluminense	3	(0)
2003	Vasco da Gama	10	(2)
2004–2005	Grêmio	26	(0)
2005–2006	FC Brussels		
2006	Villa Nova		
2007	Estácio de Sá		
2008–2009	Miami FC	33	(7)
2010–2012	Audax Rio de Janeiro	0	(0)
- * Club domestic league appearances and goals as of 22 October 2009

Leonardo "Leo" Inacio Nunes (born September 14, 1976 in Rio de Janeiro) is a Brazilian football player who last played for Miami FC in the USL First Division.

== Career ==
=== Professional ===
Leo Inacio began his playing career in his native Brazil, playing for a string of Brazilian teams, including notables such as Flamengo, Vasco da Gama and Grêmio. He won the 1999 Campeonato Carioca with Flamengo.

After a brief stop in Belgium, where he played with FC Brussels, Leo Inacio signed with Miami FC during the 2008 USL First Division season.
