= Alex Afonso =

Brazilian footballer (born 1981)

Personal information
- Full name: Alex Afonso
- Date of birth: March 24, 1981 (age 45)
- Place of birth: Jaú, Brazil
- Height: 1.83 m (6 ft 0 in)
- Position: Forward

Senior career*
Years	Team	Apps	(Gls)
1999–2002	Portuguesa	16	(2)
2002–2003	Portimonense	25	(9)
2003–2004	Alverca	30	(5)
2004–2008	Palmeiras	12	(1)
2005	→ Fortaleza (loan)	14	(4)
2006	→ São Bento (loan)		
2006	→ Guarani (loan)	17	(5)
2007	→ Bragantino (loan)		
2007	→ Marília (loan)		
2008	→ Ituano (loan)	18	(7)
2008	Miami FC	27	(15)
2009	Paraná Clube	16	(4)
2010	Bragantino	6	(2)
2010–2011	GD Estoril	30	(10)
2011	Icasa	13	(1)
2012	Audax São Paulo		
2012–2013	Rio Claro		
2013	Guaratinguetá		
2014	Rio Claro		
- * Club domestic league appearances and goals as of October 2, 2008

Alex Afonso (born 24 March 1981 in Jaú, São Paulo) is a Brazilian former football (soccer) forward.

== Career ==
Alex Afonso previously played for Fortaleza, Portuguesa and Palmeiras. On 20 April 2009 Paraná Clube bought the new player from Miami FC in the USL First Division., the player signed until June 2009.

On 1 July 2010, Alex Afonso moved to Grupo Desportivo Estoril Praia in the Portugal.

== Honors ==
=== Individual ===
- USL First Division Top Scorer: 2008
