= Cauê (footballer, born 1986) =

Brazilian footballer

Personal information
- Full name: Cauê Santos da Mata
- Date of birth: May 1, 1986 (age 40)
- Place of birth: Salvador-BA, Brazil
- Height: 1.78 m (5 ft 10 in)
- Positions: Midfielder; right-back

Team information
- Current team: São José de Porto Alegre
- Number: 2

Youth career
- 1998–2006: Vitória

Senior career*
Years	Team	Apps	(Gls)
2007–2008	Vitória	?	(?)
2007	→Consadole Sapporo (loan)	32	(2)
2008	Miami FC	26	(1)
2009–2010	São José de Porto Alegre	15	(?)

International career
2002	Brazil U-17	12	(1)
- * Club domestic league appearances and goals as of March 19, 2010

Cauê Santos da Mata, or simply Cauê (born 1 May 1986), is a Brazilian football (soccer) midfielder. He currently plays the "Campeonato Gaúcho" for "São José de Porto Alegre" and has previously played for other clubs in Brazil, Japan and USA. He also played for the Brazil national U-17 team.

== Club statistics ==
Club performance			League		Cup		Total	
Season	Club	League	Apps	Goals	Apps	Goals	Apps	Goals
Japan			League		Emperor's Cup		Total	
2007	Consadole Sapporo	J2 League	32	2	1	0	33	2
Country	Japan		32	2	1	0	33	2
Total			32	2	1	0	33	2

== Honours ==
- J2 League (2007)
