= Hyndland =

Area of Glasgow, Scotland

Coordinates: 55.878945°N 4.309824°W

- Location within Glasgow
- OS grid reference: NS556675
- Council area: Glasgow City Council
- Lieutenancy area: Glasgow
- Country: Scotland
- Sovereign state: United Kingdom
- Post town: GLASGOW
- Postcode district: G12
- Dialling code: 0141
- Police: Scotland
- Fire: Scottish
- Ambulance: Scottish
- UK Parliament: Glasgow North
- Scottish Parliament: Glasgow Kelvin and Maryhill

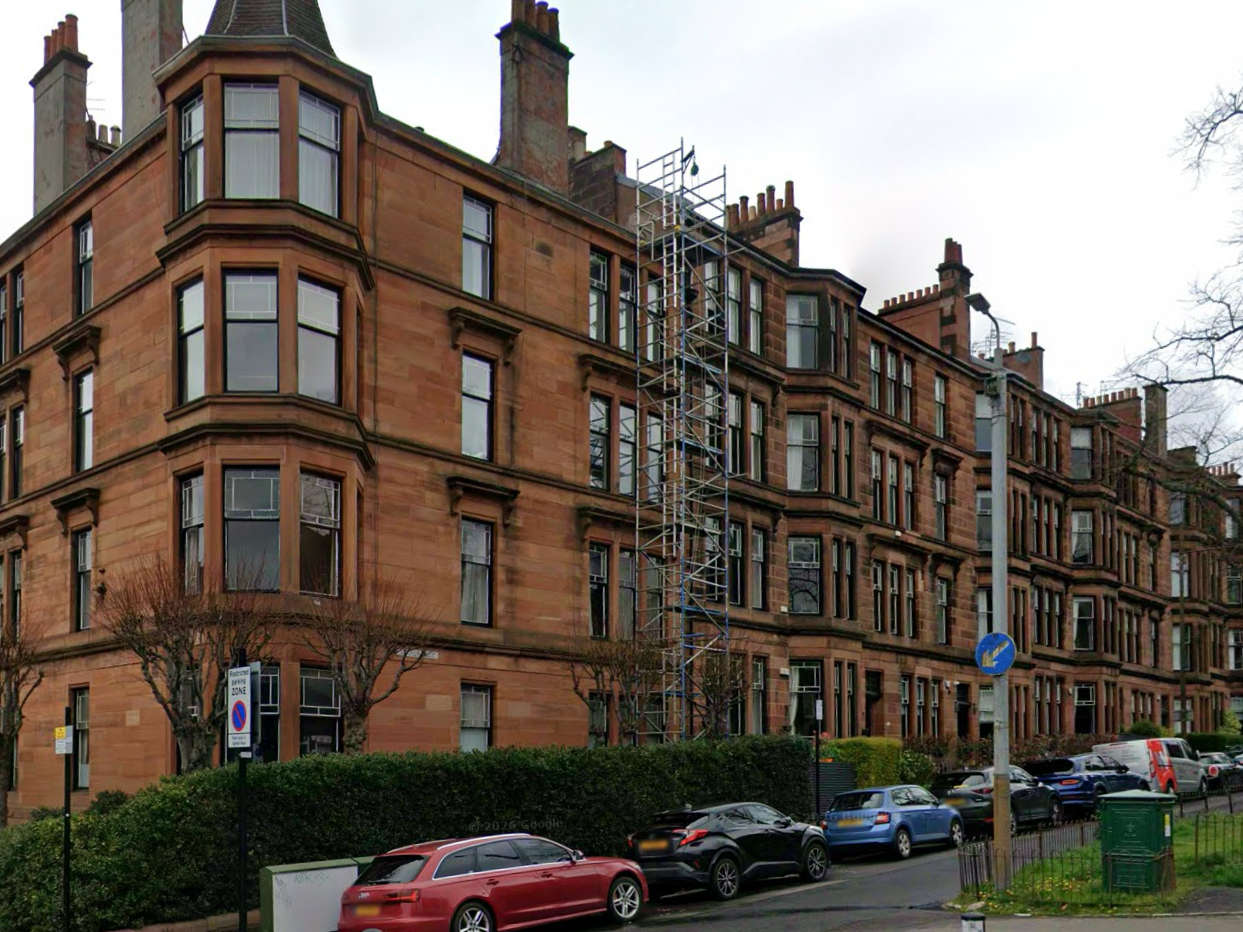

Hyndland is a residential area in the West End of the city of Glasgow, Scotland.

== Description ==
Bordering Broomhill, Dowanhill, Kelvinside and Partickhill, it is a neighbourhood populated mainly by businessmen, lawyers, GPs, professionals (many employed at the nearby University of Glasgow) and a number of noted authors, poets, actors, comedians and footballers. Average property prices in the area are considerably higher than the Glasgow or Scottish averages.

The area is defined by red sandstone tenements, many of which are fronted by communal city gardens, often embellished with ornate doorway carvings and stained glass windows, built in the late Victorian and Edwardian eras. One of the most expensive hotels in Scotland, Devonshire Gardens is located in the area along with several other fine dining options. There are also a number of townhouses built during these periods which contribute significantly to the area's character. While many of these townhouses have been split into multiple apartments to cater to modern urban living, some remain individual properties. This division of property types accounts for the area's unusual demographic.

The Glasgow and Hillhead-Jordanhill rugby teams play in the area at Hughenden Stadium. There is also a lawn bowling club (Hyndland Bowling club) which was founded in 1904. There is a local school, Hyndland Secondary School.

The area includes several churches, including Hyndland Parish Church (Church of Scotland) and St. Bride's Church (Scottish Episcopal Church), and there is a Marist House on Partickhill Road. The Church of Christ, Scientist on Hyndland Road was recently demolished, and the former United Presbyterian Church on Hyndland Street is now a theatre, called Cottier's.

Hyndland railway station is on the North Clyde and Argyle lines, offering a direct link to central Glasgow in under ten minutes, and by a number of bus routes. The nearest Subway stations are Hillhead, Partick and Kelvinhall.

Formerly, the area was also served by the huge electric tramway network of the City of Glasgow. Services 1, 5 and 5A provided pollution-free transport on Great Western Road, Byres Road, Hyndland Road and Clarence Drive.

== Conservation Area ==
The Glasgow Corporation designated the "West End Conservation Area" in 1972 and "Hyndland Conservation Area" in 1975. Planning authorities are obliged to "protect and enhance the character and appearance" of such areas, which is why Hyndland has retained so many original architectural features.

Various local buildings including the two churches, the school, the terraces of Kingsborough Gardens, and the one-time Royal Bank of Scotland building have listed building statuses.

Unfortunately there have been numerous breaches of the conservation area status in Hyndland with replacement uPVC windows, particularly in the tenements in Novar, Dudley and Clarence Drives and Airlie Street which have destroyed the visual appeal of these streets.

== History ==
Prior to development, Hyndland was an area of farmland called 'Hind Land' and belonged to the Bishops of Glasgow. The first tenements were built in 1885.

On 13 March 1941, a parachute mine was dropped on Hyndland by the Luftwaffe, destroying three tenement buildings on Dudley Drive. Also, during the war a number of refugee children from Germany and Poland were educated at Hyndland School, many of whom achieved a higher in English.

== Notable residents ==
- Frankie Boyle, comedian and writer
- Kevin Bridges, comedian
- John Burns Brooksby, renowned veterinarian
- David Calder, actor
- Andrew Cranston Artist
- Robert Carlyle, actor
- John Curtice, psephologist
- Alex Ferguson former professional footballer and manager
- Greg Hemphill, actor and comedian
- Douglas Henshall, actor
- Scott Hutchison, musician and artist
- Sanjeev Kohli, comedian, writer and actor
- Liz Lochhead, poet and dramatist
- Kelly Macdonald, actress
- Aidan Moffat, musician
- Dougie Payne, musician
- Roddy Woomble, musician
