= Hyndland Secondary School =

Location
- Lauderdale Gardens; Glasgow, G12 9QW; Scotland; 55°52′37″N 4°18′35″W

Information
- Type: State comprehensive
- Motto: Be the best version of yourself
- Established: 1912
- Headteacher: Louise Edgerton
- Gender: Mixed
- Age: 11 to 18 years
- Enrolment: 1,034 as of February 2026
- Houses: Lomond, Torridon, Katrine and Rannoch
Colour
- Publication: Hyndland News
- Forms: A, B, C, D, E and F
- Secondary: S1-S6
- Website: www.hyndland-sec.glasgow.sch.uk

Hyndland Secondary School is a non-denominational state comprehensive school in the Hyndland area of Glasgow, Scotland.

The school provides secondary education for children from the local area, although there are many children from other areas of the city. The school is part of the Hyndland New Learning Community, which consists of the school, its feeder primaries and other local children's services, and of which the former Headmaster, John F Alexander, was the Principal. Hyndland is also the only school in Glasgow where wearing uniform is not required on a day-to-day basis.

== History ==
In 1887, the Govan Parish School Board opened the Hyndland School on Hamilton Crescent (which became Fortrose Street in 1931) in Partick, designed by William Landless. In 1912, the school moved to a new building on Clarence Drive, now known as the Airlie Building, which it shared with Hyndland Primary School. In 1930, expansion led to a second building being added back-to-back with the Airlie Building, fronting onto Lauderdale Gardens and in 1997, the school's catchment area was extended to take in part of the former Victoria Drive Secondary area.

The previous building became Hamilton Crescent Supplementary School in 1912, Hamilton Crescent Advanced Central Public School in 1927, and Hamilton Crescent Junior Secondary in 1940 until 1972, when Hyndland Primary School was relocated to the building in what was by then known as Fortrose Street.

As of April 2017 there were 1,025 pupils enrolled and 73 FTE teaching staff.

In January 2025, the school was rated "excellent" by Education Scotland, the first state school to do so in over a decade. The decision was made under the quality indicators of "learning, teaching and assessment" and "raising attainment and achievement."

== Primary schools ==
Hyndland, Broomhill, Thornwood and Whiteinch primary schools serve as feeder primaries to the school. Some pupils of Broomhill Primary also have the option of going to Jordanhill School as a result of the increase in capacity between that school's primary and secondary departments. Pupils who did not attend any of these schools may apply to Glasgow City Council to be admitted to Hyndland by way of a placing request. Some pupils from Dowanhill Primary School on Highburgh Road had the option of Hyndland Secondary or Hillhead High.

== Campus ==
The school is housed in two separate buildings at either end of a small playground. The Lauderdale and Airlie Buildings, each named for the street it faces, are linked by a brick-built "link corridor", constructed as part of Glasgow City Council's public-private partnership scheme of school refurbishments, Project 2002. There is also a large floodlit synthetic pitch across the road from the Lauderdale Building. The campus lies adjacent to Clarence Drive.

The school was refurbished as part of the council's Project 2002 scheme, when a further 26 classrooms, an enlarged cafeteria and an indoor games hall were added to the facilities. A local group linked to the school subsequently obtained a National Lottery grant to upgrade facilities in the lecture theatre, which is now the Airlie Community Theatre, equipped with sound and lighting technology allowing plays to be produced in the school. It is also available for use by the community.

== Notable former pupils ==
- Professor Sir John Arbuthnott, Microbiologist
- Alan Dimmick, photographer
- Andrew Doig, Moderator of the Church of Scotland, 1981-1982
- Linda Fabiani, Member of the Scottish Parliament
- Ray Fisher and Archie Fisher, British Folk singers
- Isi Metzstein, architect,
- James David Provins Graham FRSE pharmacologist
- Jamie Hepburn, Member of the Scottish Parliament
- David MacGregor principal songwriter of Kid Canaveral, and solo artist as Broken Chanter.
- Jean McFadden, Former Leader of Glasgow City Council
- John Lowrie Morrison, painter
- Mike Richardson, cricketer
- Eddie Thompson, Businessman and former chairman of Dundee United Football Club
