= 2001 Portland Timbers season =

Portland Timbers
2001 season
- CEO: (United States) Marshall Glickman
- Head coach: (England) Bobby Howe
- Stadium: PGE Park; Portland, Oregon
- A-League: Conference: 4th Playoffs: Quarterfinals
- U.S. Open Cup: Qualification Group 9
- Top goalscorer: League: (United States) Mark Baena (13 goals); All: (United States) Mark Baena (15 goals)
- Highest home attendance: 12,295 vs. SEA (May 11)
- Lowest home attendance: 2,999 vs. MIN (Jun 6)
- Average home league attendance: League: 6,124; All: 5,840
Home colors	Away colors

The 2001 Portland Timbers season was the inaugural season for the Portland Timbers—the 3rd incarnation of a club to bear the Timbers name—of the now-defunct A-League, the second-tier league of the United States and Canada at the time.

== Regular season ==
=== April ===
April 28, 2001 A-L	El Paso Patriots	2–1 (a.e.t.)	Portland Timbers	El Paso, Texas
	Farias 23'; Leal 99'	Report	21' Kelly; (red card) 85' Tolstolutsky	Stadium: SISD Student Activities Complex; Attendance: 3,198; Referee: Reggie Rutty (USA)

=== May ===
May 5, 2001 USOC Qual	Utah Blitzz (D-3)	2–1 (a.e.t.)	Portland Timbers	Provo, Utah
	Ovalle 90+3'; Cummins 109'	Report	62' O'Neill	Stadium: The Stadium at South Field; Attendance: 750

May 6, 2001 USOC Qual	Northern Nevada Aces (D-3)	1–4	Portland Timbers	Reno, Nevada
	Chavarin 72'	Report	36', 57' O'Neill; 43' Baena; 55' Tolstolutsky	Stadium: Earl Wooster High School; Attendance: 300

May 11, 2001 A-L / Qual	Portland Timbers	2–0	Seattle Sounders	Portland, Oregon
	Baena 25'; Sancho 38'	Report		Stadium: PGE Park; Attendance: 12,295; Referee: Cory Dean (USA)

May 12, 2001 A-L / Qual	Seattle Sounders	2–1 (a.e.t.)	Portland Timbers	Seattle
	Jenkins 62'; Nguyen (red card) 74'; Kinoshita 110'	Report	32' (pen.) Sawatzky; (red card) 74' O'Neill	Stadium: Memorial Stadium; Attendance: 2,112; Referee: Ricardo Valenzuela (USA)

May 19, 2001 USOC Qual	Portland Timbers	1–0	Northern Nevada Aces (D-3)	Portland, Oregon
	Howes 25'	Report		Stadium: PGE Park; Attendance: 5,329

May 23, 2001 A-L	Portland Timbers	2–1	El Paso Patriots	Portland, Oregon
	O'Neill 18'; Sawatzky 21'; Chulis (red card) 78'	Report	63' Farias	Stadium: PGE Park; Attendance: 3,861

May 26, 2001 A-L	San Diego F.C.	3–4	Portland Timbers	San Diego
	Livett 45' (pen.); Ayim (red card) 45'; Adair 75', 87'	Report	3' Sawatzky; 13', 50', 66' Baena	Stadium: San Diego Mesa College; Attendance: 840; Referee: Emiliano Monje (USA)

=== June ===
June 2, 2001 A-L	Portland Timbers	1–0	San Diego F.C.	Portland, Oregon
	Baena 21'	Report		Stadium: PGE Park; Attendance: 4,489

June 4, 2001 Friendly	Portland Timbers	2–1	San Jose Earthquakes	Portland, Oregon
	Ochoa 24'; Wilkinson (red card) 42'; Legg 74'	Report	(red card) 42' Carrieri; 45' (pen.) Corrales	Stadium: PGE Park; Attendance: 4,566

June 6, 2001 A-L	Portland Timbers	3–1	Minnesota Thunder	Portland, Oregon
	Baena 45', 90'; Sawatzky 87'	Report	38' Lagos	Stadium: PGE Park; Attendance: 2,999; Referee: Cien Asoera (USA)

June 9, 2001 USOC Qual	Portland Timbers	1–3	Utah Blitzz (D-3)	Portland, Oregon
	Sawatzky 49'	Report	31' Ovalle; 71' Westcott; 76' Koubouras	Stadium: PGE Park; Attendance: 4,676

June 13, 2001 A-L	Portland Timbers	1–1 (a.e.t.)	Vancouver Whitecaps	Portland, Oregon
	Tolstolutsky 90'	Report	73' St. Louis; (red card) 108' Gbeke	Stadium: PGE Park; Attendance: 4,077

June 16, 2001 A-L	Minnesota Thunder	0–1	Portland Timbers	Blaine, Minnesota
		Report	55' Baena	Stadium: National Sports Center; Attendance: 4,126; Referee: Cien Asoera (USA)

June 29, 2001 A-L	Portland Timbers	0–1	Vancouver Whitecaps	Portland, Oregon
		Report	62' Valente	Stadium: PGE Park; Attendance: 6,013

=== July ===
July 3, 2001 A-L	Portland Timbers	3–2	San Diego F.C.	Portland, Oregon
	Howes 48', 71'; Sawatzky 79'	Report	89' Adair; 90' Morales	Stadium: PGE Park; Attendance: 7,271

July 9, 2001 A-L	Portland Timbers	1–0	Milwaukee Rampage	Portland, Oregon
	O'Neill 21'	Report		Stadium: PGE Park; Attendance: 5,032

July 13, 2001 A-L	Seattle Sounders	0–0 (a.e.t.)	Portland Timbers	Seattle
		Report		Stadium: Memorial Stadium; Attendance: 3,253; Referee: Kari Seitz (USA)

July 15, 2001 A-L	Vancouver Whitecaps	4–0	Portland Timbers	Burnaby, British Columbia Canada
	Kindel 16'; Jordan 42'; Heald 56' (pen.); Sulentic 88'	Report		Stadium: Swangard Stadium; Attendance: 4,062

July 21, 2001 A-L	Portland Timbers	0–1	Seattle Sounders	Portland, Oregon
	O'Neill (red card) 88'	Report	7' Ching	Stadium: PGE Park; Attendance: 11,055; Referee: Ramón Hernández (USA)

July 27, 2001 A-L	Minnesota Thunder	2–1 (a.e.t.)	Portland Timbers	Blaine, Minnesota
	Zeba 31' (pen.); Nowak (red card) 78'; Magee 99'	Report	22' Baena	Stadium: National Sports Center; Attendance: 7,514; Referee: Jesse Johnson (USA)

July 28, 2001 A-L	Milwaukee Rampage	2–3 (a.e.t.)	Portland Timbers	Franklin, Wisconsin
	Takawira 27'; Soso 77'	Report	35' Tolstolutsky; 90' Clarke; 110' Howes	Stadium: Milwaukee County Sports Complex; Attendance: 2,316

=== August ===
August 3, 2001 A-L	Toronto Lynx	3–0	Portland Timbers	Toronto Canada
	Arango 26', 41'; Sponton 39'	Report	(red card) 60' Tolstolutsky; (red card) 90' Clarke	Stadium: Varsity Stadium; Attendance: 2,591

August 5, 2001 A-L	Rochester Raging Rhinos	1–0 (a.e.t.)	Portland Timbers	Rochester, New York
	Mitchell 95'	Report		Stadium: Frontier Field; Attendance: 9,846

August 10, 2001 A-L	Vancouver Whitecaps	3–1	Portland Timbers	Burnaby, British Columbia Canada
	Jordan 13'; Morris 69'; Kindel 89'	Report	29' Howes	Stadium: Swangard Stadium; Attendance: 6,118

August 22, 2001 A-L	Portland Timbers	2–1 (a.e.t.)	Minnesota Thunder	Portland, Oregon
	Clarke 21' 98'	Report	28' Armas	Stadium: PGE Park; Attendance: 4,924

August 24, 2001 A-L	Portland Timbers	3–3 (a.e.t.)	Charlotte Eagles	Portland, Oregon
	Baena 19', 68'; Wilkinson 65'	Report	66', 78' (pen.) Gajardo; 72' Swinehart	Stadium: PGE Park; Attendance: 4,884

August 26, 2001 A-L	Portland Timbers	2–0	Charleston Battery	Portland, Oregon
	Howes 6'; O'Neill 25' (pen.)	Report		Stadium: PGE Park; Attendance: 4,891

August 30, 2001 A-L	Portland Timbers	5–2	Milwaukee Rampage	Portland, Oregon
	Baena 7'; Howes 33', 40'; O'Neill 72', 83' (pen.)	Report	10' Cooks; 89' Slivinski	Stadium: PGE Park; Attendance: 7,816

=== September ===
September 7, 2001 A-L	San Diego F.C.	2–1	Portland Timbers	San Diego
	Adair 81'; Alcaraz-Cuellar 87'	Report	(red card) 57' Howes; 60' (pen.) Wilkinson	Stadium: Merrill Douglas Stadium; Attendance: 1,042; Referee: Miguel Chicas (USA)

September 8, 2001 A-L	El Paso Patriots	1–3	Portland Timbers	El Paso, Texas
	Macias 76'; Martinez (red card) 86'	Report	15', 30' (red card) 86' Benedetti; 69' Baena	Stadium: SISD Student Activities Complex; Attendance: 337; Referee: Roger Sill (USA)

== Postseason ==
September 20, 2001 1st Rd L1	Portland Timbers	2–0	Charlotte Eagles	Portland, Oregon
	Lewis 10'; Baena 19'	Report		Stadium: PGE Park; Attendance: 4,771

September 22, 2001 1st Rd L2	Charlotte Eagles	2–3 (2–5 agg.)	Portland Timbers	Charlotte, North Carolina
	Swinehart 16'; Johnson 36'	Report	23' O'Neill; 82' Benedetti; 85' Howes	Stadium: Providence High School; Attendance: 2,141

September 27, 2001 QF L1	Portland Timbers	0–2	Hershey Wildcats	Portland, Oregon
		Report	(red card) 62' Evans; 71' Watson; 85' Degand	Stadium: PGE Park; Attendance: 4,894

September 29, 2001 QF L2	Hershey Wildcats	1–0 (3–0 agg.)	Portland Timbers	Hershey, Pennsylvania
	Feniger 28'	Report	(red card) 45' Clarke	Stadium: Hersheypark Stadium; Attendance: 1,048

== Competitions ==
=== A-League ===
==== Western Conference standings ====
Bye to quarterfinal round of playoffs
First round of playoffs

Pos	Club	Pts	Pld	W	L	T	GF	GA	GD
1	Vancouver Whitecaps	74	26	16	8	2	44	33	+11
2	San Diego F.C.	68	26	14	11	1	55	42	+13
3	Milwaukee Rampage	63	26	14	10	2	45	40	+5
4	Portland Timbers	62	26	13	10	3	41	38	+3
5	Seattle Sounders	57	26	13	12	1	40	39	+1
6	Minnesota Thunder	41	26	9	15	2	29	34	−5
7	El Paso Patriots	40	26	8	14	4	39	42	−3

Point system: 4 points for a win; 1 point for a draw; 1 point for scoring 3 or more goals in a game; 0 points for a loss

==== Results by round ====
Round	1	2	3	4	5	6	7	8	9	10	11	12	13	14	15	16	17	18	19	20	21	22	23	24	25	26
Stadium	A	H	A	H	A	H	H	H	A	H	H	H	A	A	H	A	A	A	A	A	H	H	H	H	A	A
Result	L	W	L	W	W	W	W	T	W	L	W	W	T	L	L	L	W	L	L	L	W	T	W	W	L	W

A = Away; H = Home; W = Win; L = Loss; T = Tie

=== A-League Playoffs ===
==== Playoff bracket ====
First Round
8	Charlotte Eagles	0	2	2
9	Portland Timbers	2	3	5
5	San Diego F.C.	2	2	4
12	Atlanta Silverbacks	0	2	2
7	Charleston Battery	1	1	2
10	Pittsburgh Riverhounds	2	3	5
6	Milwaukee Rampage (p)	3	0	3 (4)
11	Nashville Metros	2	1	3 (2)

Quarterfinals
1	Hershey Wildcats	2	1	3
Portland Timbers	0	0	0
4	Vancouver Whitecaps	0	4	4
San Diego F.C.	2	1	3
2	Rochester Raging Rhinos	1	3	4
Pittsburgh Riverhounds	2	0	2
3	Richmond Kickers	2	1	3
Milwaukee Rampage (a.e.t.)	2	2	4

Semifinals
Hershey Wildcats	4	0	4
Vancouver Whitecaps	0	1	1
Rochester Raging Rhinos	3	1	4
Milwaukee Rampage	2	0	2

Final
Hershey Wildcats	0
Rochester Raging Rhinos	2

==== First round ====
September 20, 2001
Leg 1

Portland Timbers	2–0	Charlotte Eagles
Lewis 10'; Baena 19'	Report

PGE Park
Attendance: 4,771

September 22, 2001
Leg 2

Charlotte Eagles	2–3	Portland Timbers
Swinehart 16'; Johnson 36'	Report	23' O'Neill; 82' Benedetti; 85' Howes

Providence High School, Charlotte, North Carolina
Attendance: 2,141

==== Quarterfinals ====
September 27, 2001
Leg 1

Portland Timbers	0–2	Hershey Wildcats
	Report	(red card) 62' Evans; 71' Watson; 85' Degand

PGE Park
Attendance: 4,894

September 29, 2001
Leg 2

Hershey Wildcats	1–0	Portland Timbers
Feniger 28'	Report	(red card) 45' Clarke

Hersheypark Stadium
Attendance: 1,048

=== U.S. Open Cup ===
==== Qualification Group 9 standings ====
Entry into second round of 2001 U.S. Open Cup
D-3 wildcard entry into second round of 2001 U.S. Open Cup

Pos	Club	Pts	Pld	W	L	T	GF	GA	GD	H2H Pts
1	Seattle Sounders	20	6	4	1	1	13	3	+10	SEA: 6 pts UTA: 1 pt
2	Utah Blitzz (D-3)	20	6	4	1	1	16	5	+11	SEA: 6 pts UTA: 1 pt
3	Portland Timbers	13	6	3	3	0	10	8	+2	
4	Northern Nevada Aces (D-3)	0	6	0	6	0	1	24	−23	

Point system: 4 points for a win; 1 point for a draw; 1 point for scoring 3 or more goals in a game; 0 points for a loss

== Club ==
=== Coaching staff ===
Position	Staff
Head coach	(England) Bobby Howe
Assistant coach	(Republic of Ireland) Jimmy Conway
Goalkeeper coach	(United States) Jim Brazeau

=== Management ===
Owner	Portland Family Entertainment
Chief Executive Officer	(United States) Marshall Glickman
Chief Financial Officer	(United States) Mark Gardiner
General Manager	(United States) Jim Taylor
Ground (capacity and dimensions)	PGE Park ( / )

== Squad ==
=== Kits ===
Home	Away

=== Final roster ===
Note: Flags indicate national team as defined under FIFA eligibility rules; some limited exceptions apply. Players may hold more than one non-FIFA nationality.

No.	Pos.	Nation	Player
1	GK	USA	Dan Moss
2	DF	CAN	Jeff Clarke
3	DF	IRL	Keith Costigan
4	DF	MEX	Jesús Ochoa
5	DF	NZL	Gavin Wilkinson
7	FW	USA	Darren Sawatzky
8	MF	NIR	Michael O'Neill
9	FW	USA	Greg Howes
10	FW	USA	Mark Baena

No.	Pos.	Nation	Player
11	MF	USA	Brian Winters
12	DF	USA	Matt Chulis
14	DF	USA	Scott Benedetti
15	MF	KGZ	Vadim Tolstolutsky
18	GK	USA	Matt Napoleon
21	DF	ENG	Neil Ryan
22	FW	SCO	Tony McPeak
26	DF	TRI	Brent Sancho
30	FW	TRI	Darin Lewis

=== Recognition ===
A-League All-League Second Team

Pos	Player	GP
GK	(United States) Matt Napoleon	26
DF	(Trinidad and Tobago) Brent Sancho	24

A-League Player of the Week

Week	Player	Opponent(s)
7	(United States) Mark Baena	El Paso Patriots, San Diego F.C.

A-League Team of the Week

Week	Player	Opponent(s)
4	(Northern Ireland) Michael O'Neill	Utah Blitzz, Northern Nevada Aces
5	(United States) Darren Sawatzky	Seattle Sounders (x2)
7	(United States) Mark Baena	El Paso Patriots, San Diego F.C.
9	(United States) Mark Baena	Minnesota Thunder, Utah Blitzz
10	(United States) Matt Napoleon	Vancouver Whitecaps, Minnesota Thunder
13	(United States) Greg Howes	San Diego F.C.
13	(Trinidad and Tobago) Brent Sancho	San Diego F.C.
14	(Northern Ireland) Michael O'Neill	Milwaukee Rampage, Seattle Sounders, Vancouver Whitecaps
20	(United States) Mark Baena	Minnesota Thunder, Charlotte Eagles, Charleston Battery
20	(Canada) Jeff Clarke	Minnesota Thunder, Charlotte Eagles, Charleston Battery
21	(United States) Greg Howes	Milwaukee Rampage
21	(Northern Ireland) Michael O'Neill	Milwaukee Rampage
22	(United States) Scott Benedetti	San Diego F.C., El Paso Patriots

=== Statistics ===
==== Appearances and goals ====
All players contracted to the club during the season included.

No.	Pos	Nat	Player	Total		A-League		Playoffs		U.S. Open Cup Qual.	
No.	Pos	Nat	Player	Apps	Goals	Apps	Goals	Apps	Goals	Apps	Goals
1	GK	(United States) USA	Dan Moss	1	0	0+1	0	0+0	0	0+0	0
2	DF	(Canada) CAN	Jeff Clarke	25	3	20+1	3	3+0	0	1+0	0
3	DF	(Republic of Ireland) IRL	Keith Costigan	23	0	13+3	0	4+0	0	2+1	0
4	DF	(Mexico) MEX	Jesús Ochoa	22	0	8+8	0	1+1	0	1+3	0
5	DF	(New Zealand) NZL	Gavin Wilkinson	33	2	24+1	2	4+0	0	4+0	0
(6)	MF	(United States) USA	Roger Gantz (released)	1	0	0+0	0	0+0	0	0+1	0
7	FW	(United States) USA	Darren Sawatzky	28	6	17+5	5	1+1	0	4+0	1
8	MF	(Northern Ireland) NIR	Michael O'Neill	29	9	22+0	5	4+0	1	3+0	3
9	FW	(United States) USA	Greg Howes	26	9	19+2	7	3+0	1	1+1	1
10	FW	(United States) USA	Mark Baena	32	15	23+1	13	4+0	1	4+0	1
11	MF	(United States) USA	Brian Winters	33	0	25+0	0	4+0	0	4+0	0
12	DF	(United States) USA	Matt Chulis	31	0	23+0	0	4+0	0	4+0	0
(12)	MF	(United States) USA	Brian Kelly (1 week loan from (United States) Los Angeles Galaxy)	1	1	1+0	1	0+0	0	0+0	0
14	DF	(United States) USA	Scott Benedetti	31	3	24+1	2	3+0	1	3+0	0
15	MF	(Kyrgyzstan) KGZ	Vadim Tolstolutsky	17	3	7+5	2	0+2	0	2+1	1
(16)	GK	(United States) USA	Adam Pearce (released)	0	0	0+0	0	0+0	0	0+0	0
(17)	MF	(United States) USA	Kevin Legg (released)	7	0	3+2	0	0+0	0	1+1	0
18	GK	(United States) USA	Matt Napoleon	34	0	26+0	0	4+0	0	4+0	0
(20)	DF	(United States) USA	José Burciaga, Jr. (1 week loan from (United States) Kansas City Wizards)	2	0	2+0	0	0+0	0	0+0	0
(20)	FW	(Canada) CAN	Rob Baarts (released)	0	0	0+0	0	0+0	0	0+0	0
21	DF	(England) ENG	Neil Ryan	9	0	1+5	0	2+0	0	1+0	0
22	FW	(Scotland) SCO	Tony McPeak	12	0	2+7	0	0+1	0	1+1	0
26	DF	(Trinidad and Tobago) TRI	Brent Sancho	30	1	24+0	1	2+0	0	4+0	0
30	FW	(Trinidad and Tobago) TRI	Darin Lewis	10	1	1+6	0	1+2	1	0+0	0
(—)	GK	(United States) USA	Matthew Nelson (released)	0	0	0+0	0	0+0	0	0+0	0

==== Top scorers ====
Players with 1 goal or more included only.

Rk.	Nat.	Position	Player	Total	A-League	Playoffs	U.S. Open Cup Qual.
1	(United States)	FW	Mark Baena	15	13	1	1
2	(United States)	FW	Greg Howes	9	7	1	1
2	(Northern Ireland)	MF	Michael O'Neill	9	5	1	3
4	(United States)	FW	Darren Sawatzky	6	5	0	1
5	(Canada)	DF	Jeff Clarke	3	3	0	0
5	(United States)	DF	Scott Benedetti	3	2	1	0
5	(Kyrgyzstan)	MF	Vadim Tolstolutsky	3	2	0	1
8	(New Zealand)	DF	Gavin Wilkinson	2	2	0	0
9	(United States)	MF	Brian Kelly	1	1	0	0
9	(Trinidad and Tobago)	DF	Brent Sancho	1	1	0	0
9	(Trinidad and Tobago)	FW	Darin Lewis	1	0	1	0
			TOTALS	53	41	5	7

==== Disciplinary record ====
Players with 1 card or more included only.

No.	Nat.	Position	Player	Total^{[A]}		A-League		Playoffs		U.S. Open Cup Qual.	
No.	Nat.	Position	Player	Booked	Sent off (straight red)	Booked	Sent off (straight red)	Booked	Sent off (straight red)	Booked	Sent off (straight red)
2	(Canada)	DF	Jeff Clarke	5	2	5	1	0	1	0	0
3	(Republic of Ireland)	DF	Keith Costigan	3	0	2	0	1	0	0	0
4	(Mexico)	DF	Jesús Ochoa	1	0	1	0	0	0	0	0
5	(New Zealand)	DF	Gavin Wilkinson	3	0	2	0	1	0	0	0
7	(United States)	FW	Darren Sawatzky	5	0	3	0	1	0	1	0
8	(Northern Ireland)	MF	Michael O'Neill	9	2	6	2	3	0	0	0
9	(United States)	FW	Greg Howes	4	1	4	1	0	0	0	0
10	(United States)	FW	Mark Baena	5	0	4	0	1	0	0	0
11	(United States)	MF	Brian Winters	8	0	8	0	0	0	0	0
12	(United States)	DF	Matt Chulis	6	1	5	1	0	0	1	0
14	(United States)	DF	Scott Benedetti	5	1	5	1	0	0	0	0
15	(Kyrgyzstan)	MF	Vadim Tolstolutsky	5	2	5	2	0	0	0	0
(17)	(United States)	MF	Kevin Legg	1	0	1	0	0	0	0	0
18	(United States)	GK	Matt Napoleon	1	0	1	0	0	0	0	0
21	(England)	DF	Neil Ryan	2	0	1	0	1	0	0	0
26	(Trinidad and Tobago)	DF	Brent Sancho	10	0	8	0	1	0	1	0
			TOTALS	73	9	61	8	9	1	3	0

==== Goalkeeper stats ====
All goalkeepers included.

No.	Nat.	Player	Total				A-League				Playoffs^{[B]}				U.S. Open Cup Qual.			
No.	Nat.	Player	MIN	GA	GAA	SV	MIN	GA	GAA	SV	MIN	GA	GAA	SV	MIN	GA	GAA	SV
1	(United States)	Dan Moss	57	3	4.74	4	57	3	4.74	4	0	0	—	0	0	0	—	0
(16)	(United States)	Adam Pearce	0	0	—	0	0	0	—	0	0	0	—	0	0	0	—	0
18	(United States)	Matt Napoleon	3152	46	1.31	169	2413	35	1.31	141	360	5	1.25	8	379	6	1.42	20
(—)	(United States)	Matthew Nelson	0	0	—	0	0	0	—	0	0	0	—	0	0	0	—	0
		TOTALS	3209	49	1.37	173	2470	38	1.38	145	360	5	1.25	8	379	6	1.42	20

=== Player movement ===
==== Transfers in ====
Date	Player	Position	Previous club	Fee/notes	Ref
February 7, 2001	(United States) Greg Howes	FW	(United States) Seattle Sounders	Acquired for 2001 2nd and 3rd round A-League College Player Draft picks	
February 27, 2001	(Canada) Jeff Clarke	DF	(United States) Baltimore Blast	Free	
February 27, 2001	(United States) Darren Sawatzky	FW	(United States) Seattle Sounders	Free	
February 27, 2001	(Kyrgyzstan) Vadim Tolstolutsky (R)	MF	(United States) Seattle Pacific Falcons	A-League College Player Draft, 1st round	
February 27, 2001	(United States) Brian Winters	MF	(United States) Minnesota Thunder	Acquired via trade; terms not disclosed	
March 22, 2001	(United States) Mark Baena	FW	(United States) San Diego Flash	Free	
April 4, 2001	(Republic of Ireland) Keith Costigan (R)	DF	(United States) Cal State Bakersfield Roadrunners	Free	
April 4, 2001	(United States) Kevin Legg	MF	(United States) Los Angeles Galaxy	Free	
April 4, 2001	(Trinidad and Tobago) Brent Sancho	DF	(Trinidad and Tobago) Joe Public	Free	
April 4, 2001	(New Zealand) Gavin Wilkinson	DF	(Republic of Ireland) Kilkenny City	Free	
April 16, 2001	(Mexico) Jesús Ochoa (R)	DF	(United States) California Baptist Lancers	Free	
April 20, 2001	(United States) Matt Napoleon	GK	(United States) Columbus Crew	Free	
April 26, 2001	(Canada) Rob Baarts	FW	(United States) Utah Freezz	Free	
April 26, 2001	(United States) Scott Benedetti	DF	(England) Nottingham Forest	Free	
April 26, 2001	(United States) Roger Gantz	MF		Free	
April 26, 2001	(Scotland) Tony McPeak	FW	(United States) Milwaukee Wave	Free	
April 26, 2001	(United States) Matthew Nelson	GK	(Republic of Ireland) Kilkenny City	Free	
April 26, 2001	(Northern Ireland) Michael O'Neill	MF	(Scotland) St Johnstone	Free	
April 26, 2001	(United States) Adam Pearce (R)	GK	(United States) Concordia Cavaliers	Free	
April 26, 2001	(England) Neil Ryan	DF	(United States) Boston Bulldogs	Free	
May 4, 2001	(United States) Matt Chulis	DF	(United States) Chicago Fire	Free	
May 22, 2001	(Trinidad and Tobago) Darin Lewis (R)	FW	(United States) Connecticut Huskies	Free	
May 24, 2001	(United States) Dan Moss (R)	GK	(United States) Yale Bulldogs	Free	

==== Loans in ====
Date	Player	Position	Previous club	Fee/notes	Ref
April 27, 2001	(United States) Brian Kelly	MF	(United States) Los Angeles Galaxy	Short-term loan; returned to Los Angeles Galaxy after one game	
August 4, 2001	(United States) José Burciaga, Jr.	DF	(United States) Kansas City Wizards	Short-term loan; returned to Kansas City Wizards after two games	

==== Transfers out ====
Date	Player	Position	Destination club	Fee/notes	Ref
May 24, 2001	(Canada) Rob Baarts	FW	Unattached	Released	
May 24, 2001	(United States) Roger Gantz	MF	Unattached	Released	
May 24, 2001	(United States) Matthew Nelson	GK	Unattached	Released	
July 27, 2001	(United States) Kevin Legg	MF	Unattached	Released	
August 2001	(United States) Adam Pearce	GK	Unattached	Released	

==== Loans out ====
Date	Player	Position	Destination club	Fee/notes	Ref
July 2001	(United States) Dan Moss	GK	(United States) Kansas City Wizards	Short-term loan	
August 6, 2001	(Mexico) Jesús Ochoa	DF	(United States) Los Angeles Galaxy	Short-term loan; returned to Portland after 1 game	
August 6, 2001	(Kyrgyzstan) Vadim Tolstolutsky	MF	(United States) Los Angeles Galaxy	Short-term loan; returned to Portland after 1 game	

== Notes ==
- Disciplinary record not available for the following games: May 5 vs. Utah Blitzz (U.S. Open Cup qualification), May 6 vs. Northern Nevada Aces (U.S. Open Cup qualification), July 15 vs. Vancouver Whitecaps (A-League regular season), August 5 vs. Rochester Raging Rhinos (A-League regular season) and September 22 vs. Charlotte Eagles (A-League playoffs).
- Goalkeeper saves not available for the following games: September 22 vs. Charlotte Eagles (A-League playoffs) and September 29 vs. Hershey Wildcats (A-League playoffs).
