= 2002 Portland Timbers season =

Portland Timbers
2002 season
- President: (United States) Mark Schuster
- Head coach: (England) Bobby Howe
- Stadium: PGE Park; Portland, Oregon
- A-League: Division: 2nd Playoffs: First Round
- U.S. Open Cup: Qualification series
- Top goalscorer: (Syria) Fadi Afash (United States) McKinley Tennyson (18 goals)
- Highest home attendance: 10,109 vs. MIN (Aug 16)
- Lowest home attendance: 3,890 vs. SEA (Jun 23)
- Average home league attendance: League: 6,261; All: 6,115
Home colors	Away colors

The 2002 Portland Timbers season was the second season for the Portland Timbers—the third incarnation of a club to bear the Timbers name—of the now-defunct A-League, the second-tier soccer league of the United States and Canada at the time.

== Preseason ==
April 9, 2002	Portland Timbers	2–1	Los Angeles Galaxy (MLS)	Portland, Oregon
19:05 (PDT)	Alcaraz-Cuellar 45'; Wilkinson 74'	Report	88' Mullan	Stadium: PGE Park; Attendance: 6,694; Referee: Jessie Johnson (USA)

=== Canterbury Cup ===
April 27, 2002 Semifinals	Vancouver Whitecaps	0–1	Portland Timbers	Burnaby, British Columbia Canada
			90' Tennyson	Stadium: Swangard Stadium

April 28, 2002 Final	Seattle Sounders	4–1	Portland Timbers	Bellevue, Washington
	Ching 14'; Farrell 22', 36'; Sawatzky 34'	Report	44' Tolstolutsky	Stadium: Sammamish High School

== Regular season ==
=== May ===
May 4, 2002 A-L / Qual	Portland Timbers	0–2	Seattle Sounders	Portland, Oregon
		Report	18' Kingsley; 38' Sawatzky	Stadium: PGE Park; Attendance: 8,775; Referee: Brian Hall (USA)

May 5, 2002 A-L / Qual	Seattle Sounders	4–1	Portland Timbers	Seattle
	Ching 14'; Farrell 76'; Sawatzky 87'; Tomlinson 89'	Report	54' (pen.) Tennyson	Stadium: Memorial Stadium; Attendance: 2,756; Referee: Cory Dean (USA)

May 10, 2002 A-L	Indiana Blast	1–0	Portland Timbers	Indianapolis
	Dresser 55'	Report		Stadium: Kuntz Stadium; Attendance: 2,348; Referee: Abiodun Okulaja (USA)

May 12, 2002 A-L	Cincinnati Riverhawks	1–0	Portland Timbers	Wilder, Kentucky
	Rockey 28'	Report		Stadium: Town & Country Sports Complex; Attendance: 567; Referee: Brian Fenlon (USA)

May 16, 2002 A-L	Portland Timbers	0–1	Milwaukee Rampage	Portland, Oregon
		Report	90' Wolyniec	Stadium: PGE Park; Attendance: 5,354; Referee: Sandra Hunt (USA)

=== June ===
June 1, 2002 A-L	Portland Timbers	1–1 (a.e.t.)	El Paso Patriots	El Paso, Texas
	Quiñones 84'	Report	68' Afash	Stadium: Dudley Field; Attendance: 1,430

June 6, 2002 A-L	Portland Timbers	3–2	Calgary Storm	Portland, Oregon
	Afash 25', 36'; Somoza 66'	Report	41' Zuñiga; 57' Napuri	Stadium: PGE Park; Attendance: 5,663

June 8, 2002 A-L	Portland Timbers	3–1	Vancouver Whitecaps	Portland, Oregon
	Afash 10'; Howes 57', 60'	Report	46' Kindel	Stadium: PGE Park; Attendance: 4,914; Referee: Dean Ajir (USA)

June 9, 2002 A-L	Vancouver Whitecaps	1–0 (a.e.t.)	Portland Timbers	Burnaby, British Columbia Canada
	Jordan 100'	Report		Stadium: Swangard Stadium; Attendance: 4,037

June 11, 2002 A-L	Calgary Storm	0–1	Portland Timbers	Calgary, Alberta Canada
		Report	88' Afash	Stadium: Foothills Stadium; Attendance: 1,450

June 19, 2002 A-L	Portland Timbers	0–0 (a.e.t.)	El Paso Patriots	Portland, Oregon
		Report		Stadium: PGE Park; Attendance: 5,212; Referee: David Simon (USA)

June 21, 2002 A-L	Portland Timbers	2–3 (a.e.t.)	Hampton Roads Mariners	Portland, Oregon
	Afash 34', 48'	Report	16' Callahan; 32' Knott; 92' Glasgow	Stadium: PGE Park; Attendance: 4,293

June 23, 2002 A-L	Portland Timbers	1–0	Seattle Sounders	Portland, Oregon
	Afash 24'	Report		Stadium: PGE Park; Attendance: 3,890; Referee: Arnold Baldeaux (USA)

June 28, 2002 A-L	Hampton Roads Mariners	1–1 (a.e.t.)	Portland Timbers	Virginia Beach, Virginia
	Hansen 86'	Report	16' Howes	Stadium: Virginia Beach Sportsplex; Attendance: 1,070

June 29, 2002 A-L	Richmond Kickers	2–0	Portland Timbers	Richmond, Virginia
	Dotsenko 50'; Henderson 88'	Report		Stadium: University of Richmond Stadium; Attendance: 2,693

=== July ===
July 4, 2002 A-L	Portland Timbers	4–1	Indiana Blast	Portland, Oregon
	Tennyson 10', 14'; Afash 55' (pen.), 68'	Report	63' Costa	Stadium: PGE Park; Attendance: 6,865

July 11, 2002 A-L	Portland Timbers	2–1	Calgary Storm	Portland, Oregon
	Tennyson 31', 39'	Report	19' Chala	Stadium: PGE Park; Attendance: 6,289; Referee: Robert Sabella (USA)

July 19, 2002 A-L	Seattle Sounders	2–1	Portland Timbers	Seattle
	Ching 61'; Gregor 71'	Report	31' Afash	Stadium: Memorial Stadium; Attendance: 2,595; Referee: Richard Heron (USA)

July 20, 2002 A-L	Calgary Storm	1–3	Portland Timbers	Calgary, Alberta Canada
	Bosch 41'; Lemire (red card) 87'	Report	1', 8' Tennyson; 31' Afash; (red card) 87' Howes	Stadium: Foothills Stadium; Attendance: 1,412; Referee: Gary Dororty (Canada)

July 25, 2002 A-L	Portland Timbers	2–0	Cincinnati Riverhawks	Portland, Oregon
	Tennyson 9', 15'	Report	(red card) 13' Matis	Stadium: PGE Park; Attendance: 7,612; Referee: Mac Pinski (USA)

=== August ===
August 3, 2002 A-L	El Paso Patriots	4–3	Portland Timbers	El Paso, Texas
	Mora 20'; Silva 30' (pen.); Frías 71', 81'	Report	14', 40' Tennyson; 54' Afash	Stadium: Dudley Field; Attendance: 2,986; Referee: Kevin Terry (USA)

August 10, 2002 A-L	Portland Timbers	3–2	Vancouver Whitecaps	Portland, Oregon
	Tennyson 31', 90'; Howes 35'	Report	44', 78' Jordan	Stadium: PGE Park; Attendance: 4,860; Referee: Jason Transtrun (USA)

August 13, 2002 A-L	Portland Timbers	6–1	El Paso Patriots	Portland, Oregon
	Tennyson 13', 19', 32', 72'; Afash 45'; Tolstolutsky 90'	Report	27' Frías	Stadium: PGE Park; Attendance: 4,671; Referee: Mohammad Zarrabi (USA)

August 16, 2002 A-L	Portland Timbers	2–3 (a.e.t.)	Minnesota Thunder	Portland, Oregon
	Afash 28'; Adair 90'	Report	5' Schmidt; 58' Torres; 98' Prendergast	Stadium: PGE Park; Attendance: 10,109; Referee: Brian Hall (USA)

August 21, 2002 A-L	Milwaukee Rampage	0–2	Portland Timbers	Milwaukee
		Report	15' Howes; 27' Afash	Stadium: Uihlein Soccer Park; Attendance: 1,368; Referee: Michael Kennedy (USA)

August 25, 2002 A-L	Minnesota Thunder	1–2 (a.e.t.)	Portland Timbers	Blaine, Minnesota
	Menyongar 68'	Report	87' Benedetti; 97' Tennyson	Stadium: National Sports Center; Attendance: 2,812; Referee: Rich Grady (USA)

August 29, 2002 A-L	Portland Timbers	3–0	Montreal Impact	Portland, Oregon
	Afash 23', 66'; Tennyson (red card) 62'; Ritchie 64'	Report	(red card) 86' Zé Roberto	Stadium: PGE Park; Attendance: 9,141; Referee: Cory Dean (USA)

=== September ===
September 1, 2002 A-L	Vancouver Whitecaps	3–1	Portland Timbers	Burnaby, British Columbia Canada
	Clarke 35', 63'; Dailly 37'	Report	22' Adair	Stadium: Swangard Stadium; Attendance: 3,712; Referee: Mauricio Navarro (Canada)

== Postseason ==
September 5, 2002 1st Rd L1	Portland Timbers	0–1	Vancouver Whitecaps	Portland, Oregon
		Report	62' Dailly	Stadium: PGE Park; Attendance: 4,071

September 7, 2002 1st Rd L2	Vancouver Whitecaps	1–0 (2–0 agg.)	Portland Timbers	Burnaby, British Columbia Canada
	Kindel 52'	Report		Stadium: Swangard Stadium; Attendance: 4,060

== Competitions ==
=== A-League ===
==== Western Conference, Pacific Division standings ====
Bye to conference semifinal round of playoffs
First round of playoffs

Pos	Club	Pts	Pld	W	L	T	GF	GA	GD
1	Seattle Sounders	107	28	23	4	1	71	27	+44
2	Portland Timbers	63	28	13	12	3	47	39	+8
3	Vancouver Whitecaps	54	28	11	12	5	41	39	+2
4	El Paso Patriots	54	28	10	11	7	38	48	−10
5	Calgary Storm	22	28	4	21	3	26	66	−40

Point system: 4 points for a win; 1 point for a draw; 1 point for scoring 3 or more goals in a game; 0 points for a loss

==== Results by round ====
Round	1	2	3	4	5	6	7	8	9	10	11	12	13	14	15	16	17	18	19	20	21	22	23	24	25	26	27	28
Stadium	H	A	A	A	H	A	H	H	A	A	H	H	H	A	A	H	H	A	A	H	A	H	H	H	A	A	H	A
Result	L	L	L	L	L	T	W	W	L	W	T	L	W	T	L	W	W	L	W	W	L	W	W	L	W	W	W	L

A = Away; H = Home; W = Win; L = Loss; T = Tie

=== A-League Playoffs ===
==== Playoff bracket ====
First Round
W4	Portland Timbers	0	0	0
W5	Vancouver Whitecaps	1	1	2
Western Conference
W3	Minnesota Thunder	2	1	3
W6	El Paso Patriots	1	1	2
E4	Richmond Kickers	1	2	3
E5	Atlanta Silverbacks	1	1	2
Eastern Conference
E3	Montreal Impact (p)	0	1	1 (6)
E6	Charlotte Eagles	1	0	1 (5)

Conference Semifinals
W1	Seattle Sounders	0	2	2
W5	Vancouver Whitecaps	2	6	8
W2	Milwaukee Rampage	0	2	2
W3	Minnesota Thunder	0	1	1
E1	Charleston Battery	2	1	3
E4	Richmond Kickers	1	3	4
E2	Rochester Raging Rhinos	0	1	1
E3	Montreal Impact	0	0	0

Conference Finals
W2	Milwaukee Rampage (a.e.t.)	0	2	2
W5	Vancouver Whitecaps	0	1	1
E4	Richmond Kickers (p)	1	0	1 (9)
E2	Rochester Raging Rhinos	1	0	1 (8)

Final
Milwaukee Rampage (a.e.t.)	2
Richmond Kickers	1

==== First round ====
September 5, 2002
Leg 1

Portland Timbers	0–1	Vancouver Whitecaps
	Report	62' Dailly

PGE Park
Attendance: 4,071

September 7, 2002
Leg 2

Vancouver Whitecaps	1–0	Portland Timbers
Kindel 52'	Report

Swangard Stadium
Attendance: 4,060

== Club ==
=== Coaching staff ===
Position	Staff
Head coach	(England) Bobby Howe
Assistant coach	(Republic of Ireland) Jimmy Conway
Goalkeeper coach	(United States) Jim Brazeau
Athletic trainer	(United States) Brock Rutherford
Strength and conditioning Coach	(United States) Carl Davison

=== Management ===
Owner	Portland Family Entertainment
President	(United States) Mark Schuster (from February 14)
General Manager	(United States) Jim Taylor
Ground (capacity and dimensions)	PGE Park ( / )

== Squad ==
=== Kits ===
Home	Away

=== Final roster ===
Note: Flags indicate national team as defined under FIFA eligibility rules; some limited exceptions apply. Players may hold more than one non-FIFA nationality.

No.	Pos.	Nation	Player
1	GK	USA	Chris Smith
2	DF	USA	Bryn Ritchie
3	DF	IRL	Keith Costigan
5	DF	NZL	Gavin Wilkinson
6	MF	USA	Ben Somoza
7	MF	MEX	Hugo Alcaraz-Cuellar
8	MF	USA	Erik Ozimek
9	FW	USA	McKinley Tennyson
10	FW	SYR	Fadi Afash
11	MF	USA	Brian Winters

No.	Pos.	Nation	Player
12	FW	USA	Greg Howes
14	DF	USA	Scott Benedetti
15	MF	KGZ	Vadim Tolstolutsky
16	FW	USA	Chugger Adair
17	MF	MEX	Jesús Ochoa (on loan from Los Angeles Galaxy)
18	GK	USA	Matt Napoleon
20	MF	USA	Jake Sagare
24	MF	USA	Chris Roner (on loan from San Jose Earthquakes)
26	DF	TRI	Brent Sancho

=== Recognition ===
A-League Scoring Champion

Player	G	A	Pts
(United States) McKinley Tennyson	18	6	42

A-League Goal Scoring Co-Champions

Player	GP	G
(Syria) Fadi Afash	22	18
(United States) McKinley Tennyson	24	18

A-League Young Offensive Player of the Year

Pos	Player	GP
FW	(United States) McKinley Tennyson	24

A-League All-League First Team

Pos	Player	GP
FW	(United States) McKinley Tennyson	24

A-League All-League Second Team

Pos	Player	GP
FW	(Syria) Fadi Afash	22

A-League Player of the Week

Week	Player	Opponent(s)
8	(Syria) Fadi Afash	Calgary Storm, Vancouver Whitecaps (x2)
18	(United States) McKinley Tennyson	El Paso Patriots, Minnesota Thunder

A-League Team of the Week

Week	Player	Opponent(s)
8	(Syria) Fadi Afash	Calgary Storm, Vancouver Whitecaps (x2)
8	(United States) Greg Howes	Calgary Storm, Vancouver Whitecaps (x2)
9	(Trinidad and Tobago) Brent Sancho	Calgary Storm
10	(United States) Matt Napoleon	El Paso Patriots, Hampton Roads Mariners, Seattle Sounders
10	(Trinidad and Tobago) Brent Sancho	El Paso Patriots, Hampton Roads Mariners, Seattle Sounders
11	(United States) Greg Howes	Hampton Roads Mariners, Richmond Kickers
12	(Syria) Fadi Afash	Indiana Blast
12	(England) Sean McAuley	Indiana Blast
13	(United States) McKinley Tennyson	Calgary Storm
14	(United States) McKinley Tennyson	Seattle Sounders, Calgary Storm
15	(United States) McKinley Tennyson	Cincinnati Riverhawks
17	(United States) McKinley Tennyson	Vancouver Whitecaps
18	(Mexico) Hugo Alcaraz-Cuellar	El Paso Patriots, Minnesota Thunder
18	(United States) McKinley Tennyson	El Paso Patriots, Minnesota Thunder
19	(Trinidad and Tobago) Brent Sancho	Milwaukee Rampage, Minnesota Thunder
20	(Syria) Fadi Afash	Montreal Impact

=== Statistics ===
==== Appearances and goals ====
All players contracted to the club during the season included.

No.	Pos	Nat	Player	Total		A-League		Playoffs	
No.	Pos	Nat	Player	Apps	Goals	Apps	Goals	Apps	Goals
1	GK	(United States) USA	Chris Smith	1	0	0+1	0	0+0	0
2	DF	(United States) USA	Bryn Ritchie	14	1	9+5	1	0+0	0
3	DF	(Republic of Ireland) IRL	Keith Costigan	30	0	28+0	0	2+0	0
(4)	DF	(England) ENG	Sean McAuley (released)	16	0	15+1	0	0+0	0
5	DF	(New Zealand) NZL	Gavin Wilkinson	28	0	26+0	0	2+0	0
6	MF	(United States) USA	Ben Somoza	22	1	12+9	1	0+1	0
7	MF	(Mexico) MEX	Hugo Alcaraz-Cuellar	29	0	26+1	0	2+0	0
8	MF	(United States) USA	Erik Ozimek	0	0	0+0	0	0+0	0
9	FW	(United States) USA	McKinley Tennyson	26	18	20+4	18	2+0	0
10	FW	(Syria) SYR	Fadi Afash	23	18	22+0	18	1+0	0
11	MF	(United States) USA	Brian Winters	28	0	26+0	0	2+0	0
12	FW	(United States) USA	Greg Howes	21	5	15+4	5	2+0	0
(13)	FW	(United States) USA	Rees Bettinger (released)	5	0	1+4	0	0+0	0
14	DF	(United States) USA	Scott Benedetti	15	1	8+5	1	2+0	0
15	MF	(Kyrgyzstan) KGZ	Vadim Tolstolutsky	13	1	6+6	1	0+1	0
16	FW	(United States) USA	Chugger Adair	20	2	6+13	2	1+0	0
17	MF	(Mexico) MEX	Jesús Ochoa	6	0	5+0	0	1+0	0
18	GK	(United States) USA	Matt Napoleon	30	0	28+0	0	2+0	0
20	MF	(United States) USA	Jake Sagare	28	0	20+7	0	0+1	0
(21)	MF	(United States) USA	Noah Delgado (released)	5	0	2+3	0	0+0	0
(22)	MF	(United States) USA	Scott Bower (2 short-term loans from (United States) San Jose Earthquakes)	4	0	3+1	0	0+0	0
24	MF	(United States) USA	Chris Roner	4	0	2+1	0	1+0	0
26	DF	(Trinidad and Tobago) TRI	Brent Sancho	29	0	27+0	0	2+0	0

==== Top scorers ====
Players with 1 goal or more included only.

Rk.	Nat.	Position	Player	Total	A-League	Playoffs
1	(Syria)	FW	Fadi Afash	18	18	0
1	(United States)	FW	McKinley Tennyson	18	18	0
3	(United States)	FW	Greg Howes	5	5	0
4	(United States)	FW	Chugger Adair	2	2	0
5	(United States)	DF	Scott Benedetti	1	1	0
5	(United States)	DF	Bryn Ritchie	1	1	0
5	(United States)	MF	Ben Somoza	1	1	0
5	(Kyrgyzstan)	MF	Vadim Tolstolutsky	1	1	0
			TOTALS	47	47	0

==== Disciplinary record ====
Players with 1 card or more included only.

No.	Nat.	Position	Player	Total		A-League		Playoffs^{[A]}	
No.	Nat.	Position	Player	Booked	Sent off (straight red)	Booked	Sent off (straight red)	Booked	Sent off (straight red)
2	(United States)	DF	Bryn Ritchie	1	0	1	0	0	0
3	(Republic of Ireland)	DF	Keith Costigan	6	0	5	0	1	0
(4)	(England)	DF	Sean McAuley	2	0	2	0	0	0
5	(New Zealand)	DF	Gavin Wilkinson	5	0	5	0	0	0
6	(United States)	MF	Ben Somoza	1	0	1	0	0	0
7	(Mexico)	MF	Hugo Alcaraz-Cuellar	3	0	3	0	0	0
9	(United States)	FW	McKinley Tennyson	2	1	2	1	0	0
10	(Syria)	FW	Fadi Afash	5	0	4	0	1	0
11	(United States)	MF	Brian Winters	7	0	7	0	0	0
12	(United States)	FW	Greg Howes	0	1	0	1	0	0
15	(Kyrgyzstan)	MF	Vadim Tolstolutsky	1	0	1	0	0	0
17	(Mexico)	MF	Jesús Ochoa	1	0	1	0	0	0
18	(United States)	GK	Matt Napoleon	1	0	1	0	0	0
20	(United States)	MF	Jake Sagare	5	0	5	0	0	0
(22)	(United States)	MF	Scott Bower	1	0	1	0	0	0
24	(United States)	MF	Chris Roner	1	0	1	0	0	0
26	(Trinidad and Tobago)	DF	Brent Sancho	8	0	7	0	1	0
			TOTALS	50	2	47	2	3	0

==== Goalkeeper stats ====
All goalkeepers included.

No.	Nat.	Player	Total				A-League				Playoffs			
No.	Nat.	Player	MIN	GA	GAA	SV	MIN	GA	GAA	SV	MIN	GA	GAA	SV
1	(United States)	Chris Smith	11	0	0.00	0	11	0	0.00	0	0	0	—	0
18	(United States)	Matt Napoleon	2776	41	1.33	113	2596	39	1.35	107	180	2	1.00	6
		TOTALS	2787	41	1.32	113	2607	39	1.35	107	180	2	1.00	6

=== Player movement ===
==== Transfers in ====
Date	Player	Position	Previous club	Fee/notes	Ref
January 7, 2002	(Syria) Fadi Afash	FW	(United States) Sacramento Knights	Free	
January 17, 2002	(Mexico) Hugo Alcaraz-Cuellar	MF	(United States) San Diego F.C.	Free	
March 4, 2002	(England) Sean McAuley	DF	(England) Rochdale	Free	
March 4, 2002	(United States) Erik Ozimek (R)	MF	(United States) Davidson Wildcats	Free	
March 21, 2002	(United States) Ben Somoza (R)	MF	(United States) Washington Huskies	A-League College Player Draft, 2nd round	
March 21, 2002	(United States) Jake Sagare (R)	MF	(United States) Washington Huskies	A-League College Player Draft, 3rd round	
March 26, 2002	(United States) McKinley Tennyson	FW	(Sweden) GIF Sundsvall	Free	
March 29, 2002	(United States) Rees Bettinger	FW	(United States) Seattle Sounders	Free	
April 2002	(United States) Chris Smith	GK	(United States) St. Louis Steamers	Free	
May 3, 2002	(United States) Noah Delgado (R)	MF	(United States) Fresno State Bulldogs	Free	
May 9, 2002	(United States) Bryn Ritchie (R)	DF	(United States) Washington Huskies	A-League College Player Draft, 1st round	
May 28, 2002	(United States) Greg Howes	FW	(United States) Milwaukee Wave	Free	

==== Loans in ====
Date	Player	Position	Previous club	Fee/notes	Ref
July 19, 2002	(Mexico) Jesús Ochoa	MF	(United States) Los Angeles Galaxy	Short-term loan; returned to Los Angeles Galaxy after two games	
July 25, 2002	(United States) Scott Bower	MF	(United States) San Jose Earthquakes	Short-term loan; returned to San Jose Earthquakes after one game	
July 25, 2002	(United States) Chris Roner	MF	(United States) San Jose Earthquakes	Short-term loan; returned to San Jose Earthquakes after one game	
August 2, 2002	(Mexico) Jesús Ochoa	MF	(United States) Los Angeles Galaxy	Short-term loan; returned to Los Angeles Galaxy after one game	
August 9, 2002	(United States) Scott Bower	MF	(United States) San Jose Earthquakes	Short-term loan; returned to San Jose Earthquakes after three games	
August 9, 2002	(United States) Chris Roner	MF	(United States) San Jose Earthquakes	Short-term loan; returned to San Jose Earthquakes after three games	
August 20, 2002	(Mexico) Jesús Ochoa	MF	(United States) Los Angeles Galaxy	Short-term loan; returned to Los Angeles Galaxy after two games	
September 4, 2002	(Mexico) Jesús Ochoa	MF	(United States) Los Angeles Galaxy	Short-term loan to end the season	
September 4, 2002	(United States) Chris Roner	MF	(United States) San Jose Earthquakes	Short-term loan to end the season	

==== Transfers out ====
Date	Player	Position	Destination club	Fee/notes	Ref
End of 2001 season	(Trinidad and Tobago) Darin Lewis	FW	N/A	Contract expired and not re-signed	
End of 2001 season	(United States) Dan Moss	GK	N/A	Contract expired and not re-signed	
October 4, 2001	(Northern Ireland) Michael O'Neill	MF	Unattached	Released	
November 27, 2001	(United States) Mark Baena	FW	Unattached	Released	
November 27, 2001	(Scotland) Tony McPeak	FW	Unattached	Released	
November 27, 2001	(England) Neil Ryan	DF	Unattached	Released	
December 5, 2001	(United States) Matt Chulis	DF	Unattached	Released	
December 20, 2001	(United States) Darren Sawatzky	FW	Unattached	Released	
March 4, 2002	(Canada) Jeff Clarke	MF	Unattached	Released	
March 4, 2002	(United States) Greg Howes	FW	Unattached	Released	
March 21, 2002	(Mexico) Jesús Ochoa	MF	Unattached	Released	
June 25, 2002	(United States) Rees Bettinger	FW	Unattached	Released	
June 25, 2002	(United States) Noah Delgado	MF	Unattached	Released	
August 6, 2002	(England) Sean McAuley	DF	Unattached	Released	

==== Loans out ====
Date	Player	Position	Destination club	Fee/notes	Ref
July 12, 2002	(United States) Matt Napoleon	GK	(United States) Dallas Burn	Short-term loan; returned to Portland after one game	
August 5, 2002	(United States) Matt Napoleon	GK	(United States) Colorado Rapids	Short-term loan; returned to Portland after one game	
August 26, 2002	(United States) Matt Napoleon	GK	(United States) Colorado Rapids	Short-term loan; returned to Portland after one game	

== Notes ==
- Disciplinary record not available for September 7 playoff game vs. Vancouver Whitecaps.
