= All-time Portland Timbers (USL) roster =

This list comprises all players who have participated in at least one league match for Portland Timbers since the USL began keeping archived records in 2003. Players who were on the roster but never played a first team game are not listed; players who appeared for the team in other competitions (US Open Cup, etc.) but never actually made a USL appearance are noted at the bottom of the page where appropriate.

A "†" denotes players who appeared in only a single match.
A "*" denotes players who are known to have appeared for the team prior to 2003.

== A ==
- (United States) Chugger Adair*
- (Armenia) Vardan Adzemian†
- (Syria) Fadi Afash
- (Mexico) Hugo Alcaraz-Cuellar
- (Ghana) Kalif Alhassan
- (Mexico) Byron Alvarez
- (United States) Jaime Ambriz
- (United States) Dan Antoniuk
- (United States) Memo Arzate

== B ==
- (Mexico) Ivan Becerra †
- (United States) Mark Baena*
- (United States) Chris Bagley
- (United States) Chad Bartlomé
- (United States) Scott Benedetti
- (United States) Alex Bengard
- (United States) Rees Bettinger*
- (United States) Scott Bower*
- (United States) Manuel Brasil*
- (United States) Adin Brown †
- (United States) Chris Brown
- (United States) Josh Brown
- (United States) Oral Bullen
- (United States) Salim Bullen
- (United States) Ray Burse
- (United States) Jose Burciaga*
- (United States) Cole Burgman*

== C ==
- (United States) Josh Cameron
- (United States) Mike Chabala
- (Zimbabwe) Mubarike Chisoni
- (United States) Matt Chulis*
- (Sweden) Johan Claesson
- (Canada) Jeff Clarke*
- (United States) Paul Conway
- (Republic of Ireland) Keith Costigan*
- (United States) Steve Cronin
- (United States) Erik Cronkrite

== D ==
- (The Gambia) Mamadou Danso
- (United States) Noah Delgado*
- (United States) Doug DeMartin
- (United States) Bright Dike
- (United States) Neil Dombrowski
- (United States) Nick Downing*
- (United States) Cameron Dunn

== E ==
- (United States) Bayard Elfvin

== F ==
- (United States) Brian Farber
- (United States) Kevin Forrest

== G ==
- (Canada) Derek Gaudet
- (United States) Kevin Goldthwaite
- (United States) Jacobi Goodfellow
- (United States) Alan Gordon
- (United States) Andrew Gregor
- (United States) Leonard Griffin
- (United States) Miguel Guante
- (Colombia) Alejandro Gutierrez

== H ==
- (England) David Hague
- (United States) Luc Harrington
- (United States) Chase Harrison
- (United States) David Hayes
- (United States) Aaron Heinzen
- (United States) David Henning
- (United States) Shaun Higgins
- (United States) Greg Howes*
- (United States) Martin Hutton

== I ==
- (United States) Sergio Iñiguez

== J ==
- (Sweden) Antouman Jallow
- (United States) Jordan James
- (United States) Bryan Jordan
- (United States) George Josten
- (United States) Ian Joy

== K ==
- (Guinea) Mandjou Keita
- (United States) Tim Karalexis
- (United States) Stephen Keel
- (United States) Brian Kelly*†
- (United States) Ehren Kilian *
- (United States) Quavas Kirk
- (United States) Brad Knighton
- (New Zealand) Cameron Knowles
- (United States) Luke Kreamalmeyer

== L ==
- (United States) Kiki Lara
- (United States) Kevin Legg *
- (Trinidad and Tobago) Darin Lewis *
- (New Zealand) Aaran Lines
- (Scotland) Bryan Little
- (United States) Rodrigo López

== M ==
- (Haiti) James Marcelin
- (United States) Garrett Marcum
- (United States) Drew McAthy
- (England) Sean McAuley *
- (United States) Jason McLaughlin
- (United States) Tony McManus
- (Scotland) Tony McPeak *
- (United States) Kevin Meissner
- (United States) Jason Melendez *
- (El Salvador) Edwin Miranda
- (Puerto Rico) Yuri Morales
- (United States) Lee Morrison
- (United States) Dan Moss *†
- (Netherlands) Ibad Muhamadu

== N ==
- (United States) Matt Napoleon *
- (United States) Alex Nimo
- (Japan) Takuro Nishimura
- (United States) Michael Nsien

== O ==
- (Nigeria) O. J. Obatola
- (Mexico) Jesús Ochoa *
- (Ivory Coast) Arsène Oka
- (Kenya) Lawrence Olum
- (Northern Ireland) Michael O'Neill *

== P ==
- (United States) Tom Poltl
- (United States) Ryan Pore
- (El Salvador) Steve Purdy
- (United States) Matt Pyzdrowski

== R ==
- (United States) Mike Randolph
- (United States) Troy Ready
- (United States) Bryn Ritchie
- (United States) Chris Roner*
- (England) Neil Ryan*

== S ==
- (United States) Jake Sagare
- (Trinidad and Tobago) Brent Sancho *
- (Puerto Rico) Josh Saunders
- (United States) Shawn Saunders
- (United States) Keith Savage
- (United States) Darren Sawatzky*
- (United States) Chris Seitz
- (United States) Ronnie Silva
- (United States) Chris Smith*†
- (Canada) Ross Smith
- (United States) Ben Somoza*
- (United States) Curtis Spiteri*
- (Japan) Takayuki Suzuki

== T ==
- (United States) Matt Taylor
- (England) Tom Taylor
- (United States) McKinley Tennyson
- (Canada) Justin Thompson
- (United States) Scot Thompson
- (Kyrgyzstan) Vadim Tolstolutsky*
- (Solomon Islands) Benjamin Totori

== V ==
- (United States) Jake Vaughn
- (United States) Brian Visser †

== W ==
- (United States) Jamil Walker
- (United States) Jarrod Weis
- (United States) Josh Wicks
- (New Zealand) Gavin Wilkinson
- (United States) Adam Wilson
- (United States) Brian Winters

== Y ==
- (United States) Ryan Youngblood

== Others ==
- (United States) Scott Bolkan - Bolkan never made a league appearance for Portland, but did play for them in the U.S. Open Cup in 2008.

== See also ==
- All-time Portland Timbers (MLS) roster -- equivalent list for this team's Major League Soccer successor

== Sources ==
- "USL-1 Team History". uslsoccer.com. United Soccer Leagues.
