= Tony McPeak =

Tony Peak may refer to:

- Merrill McPeak, Merrill Anthony "Tony" McPeak, former Chief of Staff of the United States Air Force
- Tony McPeak (footballer), Scottish soccer player
