= Abriel =

Abriel may refer to:

- Abriel (band), an American band
- Fabrice Abriel (born 1979), French football player
- Abriel Nei Debrusc Borl Paryun Lafiel, a fictional character from Banner of the Stars
