= Jesús Ochoa =

Jesús Ochoa may refer to:

- Jesús Ochoa (actor) (born 1959), Mexican actor
- Jesús Ochoa (footballer) (born 1981), Mexican soccer player
- Jesus Ochoa, a US Border Patrol agent involved in fatal shooting of Alex Pretti in Minneapolis on January 24, 2026.
