= Caal =

Caal is a surname. Notable people with the surname include:

- Jakelin Caal (2011–2018), Guatemalan immigrant child
- Oscar Valentín Leal Caal (1971–2012), Guatemalan politician

== See also ==
- Call (surname)
