= Roger Gantz =

American soccer player

Personal information
- Place of birth: United States
- Position: Midfielder

College career
Years	Team	Apps	(Gls)
1989–1993	Portland Pilots		

Senior career*
Years	Team	Apps	(Gls)
1988	Portland Timbers		
1993–1997	Portland Pride (indoor)		
2001	Portland Timbers	0	(0)
- * Club domestic league appearances and goals

Roger Gantz is an American retired soccer defender who played one season in the Western Soccer Alliance and three in the Continental Indoor Soccer League.

== Early life ==
Gantz was raised in Portland, Oregon, where he was a standout soccer player at the Catlin Gabel School. While still in high school, he spent one season playing as an amateur with the semi-professional F.C. Portland of the Western Soccer Alliance.

== Career ==
After graduating from Catlin in 1989, he began attending the University of Portland. He played four seasons, 1989 to 1993, with the Portland Pilots men's soccer team. In 1993, he spent the collegiate off-season with the expansion Portland Pride of the Continental Indoor Soccer League. He would spend five seasons with the Pride. In the spring of 2001, he tried out with the expansion Portland Timbers of the USL First Division but was released on May 25, 2001. Gantz lives in Hamilton, Montana, where he works in real estate.
