= Brian Kelly (American soccer) =

American soccer player (born 1974)

Personal information
- Date of birth: October 6, 1974 (age 52)
- Place of birth: Mission Viejo, California, United States
- Height: 5 ft 7 in (1.70 m)
- Position: Midfielder

Youth career
- 1993–1996: Duke University

Senior career*
Years	Team	Apps	(Gls)
1997–2000	MetroStars	85	(10)
2000–2001	Los Angeles Galaxy	11	(0)
2001	→ Portland Timbers (loan)	1	(1)
2001	Tampa Bay Mutiny	2	(0)

International career
- United States U17
- United States U20
- * Club domestic league appearances and goals

Brian Kelly (born October 6, 1974) is an American former professional soccer player who played as a midfielder. Kelly spent five seasons in Major League Soccer. He also played at both the 1991 FIFA U-17 World Championship and 1993 FIFA World Youth Championship.

== Soccer ==
=== Club career ===
Kelly, after starring at Lake Lehman High School in Northeastern Pennsylvania, attended Duke University, playing on the men's soccer team from 1993 to 1996. In February 1997, the New York/New Jersey MetroStars selected Kelly in the first round (fifth overall) in the 1997 MLS College Draft. He remained with the MetroStars until the 2000 season. That year, he played seven games in New Jersey before being traded to the Los Angeles Galaxy in exchange for Roy Myers. He played eleven games with the Galaxy, began the 2001 season with the Galaxy before finishing it with the Tampa Bay Mutiny. Before moving to Tampa Bay, the Galaxy sent Kelly on loan to the Portland Timbers where he scored the first goal in that team's history when he hit in a rebounded shot from Mark Baena in a 2–1 loss to the El Paso Patriots. He left MLS at the end of the season.

=== National team ===
In 1991, Kelly was a member of the U.S. U-17 national team at the 1991 FIFA U-17 World Championship. Two years later, he played at the 1993 FIFA World Youth Championship for the U.S. U-20 national team.
