= All-time Portland Timbers (MLS) roster =

This list comprises all players who have participated in at least one league match for Portland Timbers since the team's first Major League Soccer season in 2011. Players who were on the roster but never played a first team game are not listed; players who appeared for the team in other competitions (U.S. Open Cup, CONCACAF Champions League, etc.) but never actually made an MLS appearance are noted at the bottom of the page.

A "†" denotes a player who appeared in only a single match.

== A ==
- (Nigeria) Fanendo Adi
- (United States) Eric Alexander
- (Ghana) Kalif Alhassan
- (Lithuania) Vytautas Andriuškevičius
- (Colombia) Victor Arboleda
- (Sweden) Samuel Armenteros
- (Nigeria) Gbenga Arokoyo †
- (Colombia) Dairon Asprilla
- (United States) Jeff Attinella
- (Argentina) David Ayala

== B ==
- (England) Jack Barmby
- (United States) Joe Bendik
- (Argentina) Sebastián Blanco
- (United States) Nat Borchers
- (Scotland) Kris Boyd
- (United States) Freddie Braun
- (Jamaica) Neco Brett †
- (United States) Adin Brown
- (United States) Eric Brunner

== C ==
- (Costa Rica) Julio Cascante
- (United States) Mike Chabala
- (Colombia) Diego Chará
- (Colombia) Yimmi Chará
- (United States) Steve Clark
- (Argentina) Tomás Conechny
- (United States) Kenny Cooper
- (Canada) Maxime Crepeau

== D ==
- (The Gambia) Mamadou Danso
- (France) Claude Dielna
- (Nigeria) Bright Dike
- (Portugal) David Da Costa

== E ==
- (United States) Jeremy Ebobisse
- (Brazil) Evander

== F ==
- (United States) Marco Farfan
- (Argentina) Brian Fernández
- (Argentina) Gastón Fernández
- (El Salvador) Andrés Flores
- (United States) George Fochive
- (United States) Mike Fucito

== G ==
- (New Zealand) Jake Gleeson
- (United States) Kevin Goldthwaite
- (United States) Ned Grabavoy
- (Costa Rica) David Guzmán

== H ==
- (Puerto Rico) Jeremy Hall
- (United States) Harold Hanson †
- (United States) Michael Harrington
- (United States) David Horst

== J ==
- (The Gambia) Modou Jadama †
- (Haiti) Andrew Jean-Baptiste
- (Brazil) Jeanderson
- (United States) Jack Jewsbury
- (England) Eddie Johnson
- (Jamaica) Ryan Johnson
- (Canada) Will Johnson
- (United States) Sawyer George Jura †

== K ==
- (Norway) Pa Modou Kah
- (Japan) Kosuke Kimura
- (United States) Chris Klute
- (Serbia) Miloš Kocić
- (Ghana) Adam Larsen Kwarasey

== L ==
- (United States) Foster Langsdorf †
- (United States) Peter Lowry

== M ==
- (Democratic Republic of the Congo) Larrys Mabiala
- (Haiti) James Marcelin
- (Jamaica) Darren Mattocks
- (United States) Jack McInerney
- (United States) Rauwshan McKenzie
- (Argentina) Lucas Melano
- (United States) Eric Miller
- (Costa Rica) Roy Miller
- (United States) Ryan Miller
- (Scotland) Adam Moffat
- (Paraguay) Jorge Moreira
- (Colombia) Hanyer Mosquera
- (Democratic Republic of the Congo) Danny Mwanga
- (United States) Chance Myers †
- (Canada) Kamal Miller

== N ==
- (United States) Darlington Nagbe
- (United States) Michael Nanchoff

== O ==
- (United States) Amobi Okugo
- (Kenya) Lawrence Olum
- (United States) Danny O'Rourke

== P ==
- (Jamaica) Lovel Palmer
- (Argentina) Norberto Paparatto
- (Paraguay) Cristhian Paredes
- (United States) Taylor Peay
- (United States) Troy Perkins
- (Colombia) Jorge Perlaza
- (Martinique) Frédéric Piquionne
- (Peru) Andy Polo
- (United States) Ryan Pore
- (Jamaica) Alvas Powell
- (El Salvador) Steve Purdy
- (Canada) James Pantemis

== R ==
- (United States) Brent Richards
- (Jamaica) Donovan Ricketts
- (England) Liam Ridgewell
- (United States) Brad Ring †

== S ==
- (France) Mikaël Silvestre
- (Scotland) Steven Smith
- (Cameroon) Franck Songo'o
- (New Zealand) Finn Surman

== T ==
- (Jamaica) Jermaine Taylor
- (England) Steven Taylor
- (New Zealand) Bill Tuiloma

== U ==
- (Uganda) Brian Umony
- (Argentina) Maximiliano Urruti

== V ==
- (Colombia) José Adolfo Valencia
- (United States) Zarek Valentin
- (Argentina) Diego Valeri
- (United States) Jorge Villafaña

== W ==
- (Costa Rica) Rodney Wallace
- (United States) Andrew Weber

== Y ==
- (Ghana) Ishmael Yartey

== Z ==
- (Democratic Republic of the Congo) Steve Zakuani
- (United States) Ben Zemanski
- (United States) Sal Zizzo

== Miscellaneous ==
- (United States) Steven Evans – Made one U.S. Open Cup appearance.
- (United States) Wade Hamilton – Made one U.S. Open Cup appearance.
- (United States) Ryan Kawulok – Made one U.S. Open Cup appearance.
- (Colombia) Sebastián Rincón – Made one U.S. Open Cup appearance.
- (Zimbabwe) Schillo Tshuma – Made one U.S. Open Cup appearance.

== See also ==
- All-time Portland Timbers USL roster—equivalent list for this team's second division predecessor

== Sources ==
- "MLS Number Assignments Archive".
