= Ben Somoza =

American soccer player

Benjamin Somoza
Personal information
- Full name: Benjamin David Somoza
- Date of birth: August 16, 1979 (age 47)
- Place of birth: Seattle, Washington, United States
- Height: 1.80 m (5 ft 11 in)
- Position: Midfielder

Youth career
- 1998–2001: Washington Huskies

Senior career*
Years	Team	Apps	(Gls)
1999–2001	Seattle Sounders Select		
2002	Portland Timbers	21	(1)
2003–2006	Seattle Sounders	60	(2)
Total		81+	(3+)

Managerial career
- 2009: Washington Huskies (interim assistant)
- * Club domestic league appearances and goals

Benjamin David Somoza (born August 16, 1979) is a former American soccer player.

== Career ==
After four seasons at the University of Washington, Somoza spent the 2002 season with Portland Timbers before joining their rivals Seattle Sounders where he won the 2005 USL First Division title.

In 2009, he served as an interim assistant coach for the University of Washington while Brandon Prideaux was finishing up his final season of his career with the Chicago Fire.

== Honors ==
=== Edmonds Woodway High School ===
- 4 year varsity letter winner - Soccer
- 3 year varsity letter winner - Basketball
- 1st Team All Wesco soccer selection - 1996, 1997, 1998
- Led 1998 team in points (17), goals (5), assists (7)
- Seattle Times' North End Athlete of the Year - 1998
- Holds Edmonds Woodway High School career record for assists

=== University of Washington ===
- 4-year letter winner - 1998–2002
- 2 time Team Captain
- Helped lead team to NCAA tournament - 1998–2002
- 1st Team All-Pac-10 honoree as a Junior (started in all 20 games)
- Selected to the National Amateur Team - 1999
- Won 3 league championships in 1998, 1999, and the inaugural Pac-10 crown in 2000
- 2nd Team All Far West Region - 2001
- 1st Team All-Pac-10 - 2000, 2001
- 6th all time UW assist leader with 23 assists
- 58-21-2 record at University of Washington over 4 years

=== Seattle Sounders ===
- USL First Division Championship (1): 2005
