= Kevin Legg =

American soccer player

Personal information
- Date of birth: February 19, 1972 (age 54)
- Place of birth: San Diego, California, U.S.
- Height: 5 ft 8 in (1.73 m)
- Position: Midfielder

Youth career
- 1991–1993: San Diego Toreros

Senior career*
Years	Team	Apps	(Gls)
1994–1995	San Diego Sockers (indoor)	37	(22)
1994	→ Detroit Neon (indoor - loan)	23	(19)
1996	Detroit Neon (indoor)	24	(9)
1996–1997	Tampa Bay Terror (indoor)	5	(1)
1997	Portland Pride (indoor)		
1998–2001	San Diego Flash	81	(14)
1998	Kansas City Attack (indoor)	7	(1)
1999	Portland Pythons (indoor)		
2001	Portland Timbers	5	(0)
2003–2004	San Diego Sockers (indoor)	23	(7)
- * Club domestic league appearances and goals

Kevin Legg is an American retired soccer midfielder who played professionally in the USL A-League, Continental Indoor Soccer League and National Professional Soccer League.

Legg attended the University of San Diego, playing only three seasons (1991 -1993) before turning professional. In 1994, he signed with the San Diego Sockers of the Continental Indoor Soccer League. On July 22, 1994, the Sockers loaned Legg to the Detroit Neon for the rest of the season. Legg returned to the Sockers for the 1995 season. On May 18, 1996, the Sockers traded Legg to the Detroit Neon for the first pick in the CISL Supplemental Draft. In the fall of 1996, Legg joined the Tampa Bay Terror of the National Professional Soccer League. In 1997, he played for the Portland Pride in the CISL. In 1998, Legg moved outdoors with the San Diego Flash of the USISL A-League. He would play four seasons with the Flash. In the fall of 1998, Legg joined the Kansas City Attack. The Attack waived him on December 2, 1998. He then briefly played for the Portland Pythons of the World Indoor Soccer League. In January 2000, the Los Angeles Galaxy called up Legg for the 2000 CONCACAF Champions' Cup. In April 2001, Legg joined the expansion Portland Timbers. Legg broke his toe early in the season, limiting his playing time. On July 27, 2001, the Timbers released Legg. In 2003, Legg joined the second San Diego Sockers for one season in the second Major Indoor Soccer League.
