= McKinley Tennyson =

American soccer player

Personal information
- Full name: McKinley Tennyson, Jr.
- Date of birth: March 24, 1979 (age 47)
- Place of birth: Monterey, California, United States
- Height: 6 ft 2 in (1.88 m)
- Position: Forward

Youth career
- 1997–2000: UCLA

Senior career*
Years	Team	Apps	(Gls)
2001	GIF Sundsvall	3	(0)
2002–2003	Portland Timbers	52	(29)
2002	Los Angeles Galaxy	0	(0)

International career
	United States U17	2	(0)
1997–1998	United States U20	6	(3)
- * Club domestic league appearances and goals

McKinley Tennyson (born March 24, 1979, in Monterey, California) is an American soccer forward who played two seasons with the Portland Timbers and the 2002 playoffs with the Los Angeles Galaxy. He was the 2002 USL First Division points leader.

== Youth ==
Tennyson grew up the son of a U.S. Army officer, moving every few years. When he was eight, the family settled in Indianapolis, Indiana, where Tennyson lived until graduating from North Central High School. Tennyson won four consecutive state championships with the North Central soccer team while being selected as a 1995 and 1996 Parade Magazine High School All American. In 1997, he entered UCLA where he would play on the men's soccer team until 2000. In 1997, Tennyson and his teammates won the NCAA Men's Soccer Championship and in 2000, he was a second team All American. He graduated with a bachelor's degree in sociology in 2004.

== National team ==
Tennyson earned two caps with the United States U-17 men's national soccer team and six with the U.S. U-20 national team. He was an integral part of the team as it qualified for the 1999 FIFA World Youth Championship, but was not selected for the roster at the finals.

== Professional ==
In February 2001, the Columbus Crew selected Tennyson in the fourth round (39th overall) in the 2001 MLS SuperDraft. Tennyson did not sign with Columbus, but moved to Europe where he trained with teams in Germany, Norway, and Sweden. On September 5, 2001, he signed with GIF Sundsvall, becoming the first African American from UCLA to play professional soccer in the Swedish Allsvenskan. On August 17, 2001, the Crew traded the rights to Tennyson to the Los Angeles Galaxy in exchange for a 2002 conditional draft pick. In 2002, Tennyson signed with the Portland Timbers of the USL First Division. That season, Tennyson led the Timbers in scoring with 18 goals and 6 assists in 24 games, which was good enough to lead the USL First Division in points and tied him with Fadi Afash and Eduardo Sebrango as joint goals leader. Tennyson was named to the USL All-Star First Team and earned other league awards. On August 15, 2002, following his successful rookie season, Tennyson signed as a developmental player with the Los Angeles Galaxy. On October 2, 2002, he entered his first game with Galaxy and in Major League Soccer, a playoff game against the Kansas City Wizards. He scored 31 seconds later. Tennyson's fortune continued and the Galaxy went on to win the 2002 MLS Soccer Championship beating the New England Revolution in the final. After unsuccessful negotiations with the Galaxy, Tennyson returned to the Portland Timbers for the 2003 USL season. In 2003, his production dropped due to a painful hip injury, which required surgery in the off-season. However, Tennyson still finished with 11 goals and 3 assists in 28 games. In 2004, Tennyson signed a two-year contract with the Timbers. Tennyson could not honor the contract and was retired because of the hip surgery and unsuccessful rehabilitation program. McKinley consulted hip specialist at Santa Monica Orthopaedic & Sports Medicine Group and Orthopaedic Medical Group of San Diego to make his final decision.

== Post soccer career ==
In May 2006, Tennyson completed the Riordan Fellows Program at the UCLA Anderson School of Management, an eight-month fellowship for minorities with outstanding leadership potential. The Riordan Fellows Program targets current college students and recent college graduates who are considering graduate education in business management. Its core purpose is to educate, prepare, and motivate these individuals to competitively apply and succeed in a top MBA program and a career in management. McKinley is currently a Business Development Manager in the Office of Mayor Antonio R. Villaraigosa for the City of Los Angeles, supporting small business owners with access to capital and contracting opportunities with public/private entities.
