= Marcel Matis =

Romanian footballer

Personal information
- Place of birth: Romania
- Position: Midfielder

Senior career*
Years	Team	Apps	(Gls)
2000-2003	Cincinnati Riverhawks	99	(22)
2006	Cincinnati Kings	2	(0)
- * Club domestic league appearances and goals

Marcel Matis (born in Romania) is a retired Romanian footballer.
