= Jim Brazeau =

Retired American soccer goalkeeper (born 1967

Personal information
- Full name: James Brazeau
- Date of birth: February 27, 1967 (age 59)
- Place of birth: Seattle, Washington, U.S.
- Height: 6 ft 1 in (1.85 m)
- Position: Goalkeeper

Youth career
- 1985–1986: Pacific University
- 1989: Oregon State University

Senior career*
Years	Team	Apps	(Gls)
1990	Seattle Storm		
1993	Portland Pride (indoor)		
1994	Washington Warthogs (indoor)		
1995–1997	Portland Pride (indoor)		

Managerial career
- 1991: Portland Community College
- 1992–1995: Oregon State University (assistant)
- 2000–2013: Pacific University
- 2001–2005: Pacific University (women)
- 2001–2005: Portland Timbers (assistant)
- 2007–2009: Portland Timbers (assistant)
- * Club domestic league appearances and goals as of 31 May 2006 ‡ National team caps and goals as of 22 June 2006

Jim Brazeau is an American retired soccer goalkeeper. He played one season in the American Professional Soccer League and five in the Continental Indoor Soccer League. He earned the first shutout in CISL history on August 25, 1993.

== Playing ==
Brazeau attended Seattle Preparatory School. He then began his college career as a defender with Pacific University in 1985. After two seasons, he transferred to Oregon State University in 1989. When he arrived, the Beavers’ goalkeeper had just been declared academically ineligible and Brazeau was converted from defender to goalkeeper. He was named the 1989 first team Cascade Division goalkeeper. In 1990, Brazeau signed with the Seattle Storm in the American Professional Soccer League. The Storm withdrew from the league following the season]. In 1993, he joined the newly established Portland Pride in the Continental Indoor Soccer League. He broke his jaw early in the season, but in his first game back on August 25, 1995, Brazeau became the first CISL goalkeeper to post a shutout in Portland's 10–0 victory over the Pittsburgh Stingers. In 1994, he moved to the Washington Warthogs, but was back in Portland in 1995. He retired following the 1997 season. Brazeau played two seasons for the Boxers as a defender, helping the team to the NAIA District II championship in 1986. He followed former Boxer head coach Jimmy Conway to Oregon State where he played one season as a goalkeeper, earning all-conference honors.

== Coaching ==
In 1991, Brazeau spent one season as the head coach of Portland Community College. The next year, he was hired as an assistant coach with Oregon State University. He held this position until 1995. In 1994, he became a staff coach with both the Oregon Olympic Development Program and with F.C. Portland, a local youth club. He remained with the Oregon Olympic program until 2001 and F.C. Portland through 2006. In 1999 and 2000, he was an assistant coach with Seattle Preparatory School. In 2000, he was hired as the head coach for Pacific University men's team, becoming head coach of the women's team in 2001. That year, he also became the goalkeeper coach for the Portland Timbers of the USL First Division. He coached with the Timbers through 2005, then rejoined the team in 2007 through 2009. He is also the Willamette United FC Club Director.
