= Leo Gajardo =

Chilean footballer (born 1968)

Personal information
- Full name: Leonardo Remigio Gajardo San Martín
- Date of birth: October 1, 1968 (age 58)
- Place of birth: Coronel, Chile
- Height: 5 ft 8 in (1.73 m)
- Positions: Midfielder; defender

Senior career*
Years	Team	Apps	(Gls)
2001–2003	Charlotte Eagles	59	(5)
- * Club domestic league appearances and goals

Leo Gajardo is a retired Chilean association football midfielder who played for the Charlotte Eagles in the USL A-League from 2001 to 2003.
