= Mike Feniger =

American soccer player

Personal information
- Full name: Michael Feniger
- Date of birth: May 18, 1975 (age 51)
- Place of birth: Mechanicsburg, Pennsylvania, U.S.
- Height: 5 ft 10 in (1.78 m)
- Positions: Forward; midfielder

College career
Years	Team	Apps	(Gls)
1993–1996	East Stroudsburg Warriors		

Senior career*
Years	Team	Apps	(Gls)
1997–2001	Hershey Wildcats	131	(12)
2001–2002	Harrisburg Heat (indoor)	25	(5)
2003	Reading Rage	14	(4)
2004	Harrisburg City Islanders	14	(2)
- * Club domestic league appearances and goals

Mike Feniger is an American retired soccer player.

In 1993, Feniger graduated from Cumberland Valley High School. He attended East Stroudsburg University of Pennsylvania where he was a 1994, 1995 and 1996 First Team Division II All American soccer player. He holds the team's career records in goals (76) and assists (37). In 2010, East Stroudsburg inducted Feniger into the school's athletic hall of fame.

In December 1996, the Philadelphia KiXX picked Feniger in the first round (second overall) of the National Professional Soccer League draft. On February 1, 1997, the Colorado Rapids selected him in the third round (twenty-first overall) of the 1997 MLS College Draft. Four days later, the Hershey Wildcats picked him in the first round of the USISL A-League draft. The Rapids released him during the pre-season and Feniger signed with the Wildcats. He played five seasons with the Wildcats until the team folded following the 2001 season. On October 19, 2001, he signed with the Harrisburg Heat of the second Major Indoor Soccer League. On December 23, 2003, he became one of the three players to sign with the expansion Harrisburg City Islanders.
