= Jeff Clarke (Canadian soccer) =

Canadian association footballer

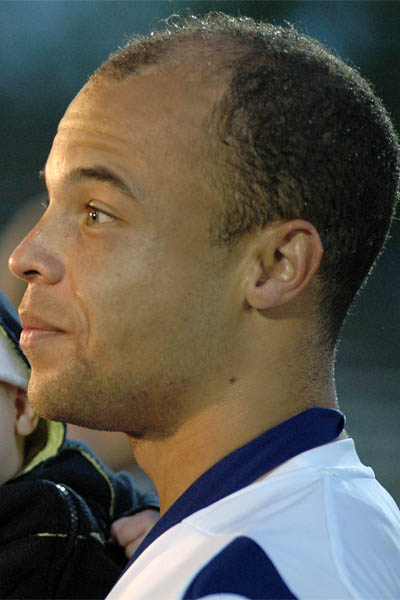

Personal information
- Full name: Jeffrey Clarke
- Date of birth: October 18, 1977 (age 49)
- Place of birth: New Westminster, British Columbia, Canada
- Height: 5 ft 9 in (1.75 m)
- Position: Midfielder

Team information
- Current team: Surrey United Firefighters
- Number: 6

Youth career
- Metro Ford

College career
Years	Team	Apps	(Gls)
1996	Simon Fraser Clan		

Senior career*
Years	Team	Apps	(Gls)
1997	Vancouver 86ers	15	(1)
1997–1999	St. Patrick's Athletic F.C.	6	(1)
1999–2000	Longford Town		
2000	Hampton Roads Mariners	7	(0)
1999–2000	Edmonton Drillers (indoor)	7	(3)
2000	Baltimore Blast (indoor)	9	(0)
2001	Portland Timbers	21	(3)
2002–2008	Vancouver Whitecaps	155	(12)
2008	→ Vancouver Whitecaps Residency (loan)	1	(0)
2009–	Surrey United Firefighters		

International career
1997–2002	Canada	19	(1)

Managerial career
- 2009: Simon Fraser University (assistant)
- 2010–: Surrey United Women
Medal record
Representing Canada
Men's soccer
CONCACAF Gold Cup
Winner	2000 United States
- * Club domestic league appearances and goals

Jeffrey Clarke (born October 18, 1977) is a Canadian former professional soccer player, who is currently playing for Surrey United Firefighters and works as head coach by Surrey United Women. Clarke earned nineteen caps, scoring one goal, for the Canadian national team. He most recently played for the Vancouver Whitecaps in the First Division of the United Soccer Leagues.

== Club career ==
=== Youth and university ===
Clarke grew up in Coquitlam, British Columbia where he played youth soccer with Coquitlam Metro-Ford SC. During his time with the team, Metro Ford won three provincial and two Canadian championships. Clarke attended Centennial School, and after graduating in 1996, attended Simon Fraser University where he played on the men's soccer team for one year. While he left university prior to completing his degree, he has since completed a degree in Criminology with a diploma in Legal Studies.

=== Professional ===
In 1997, Clarke signed with the Vancouver 86ers, becoming the team's starting sweeper. After one season in Vancouver, Clarke decided to move to Europe. After the 1997 season, he moved to Belgium, where he had a trial with Royal Antwerp. However, the first of several work permit problems prevented him from signing with Antwerp. In 1998, he joined League of Ireland club St. Patrick's Athletic F.C. He scored his only goal against Bray Wanderers in May 1999 to clinch the league title for St. Pats.

After the 1999 season, Clarke moved again, this time to the Hampton Roads Mariners. At the time, he was attempting to join clubs in several European leagues, including England, Denmark, and Austria, but, once again, he had difficulty gaining a work permit. In July 2000, he signed with Longford Town. However, he left the team and returned to Canada in August when Canadian national team coach Holger Osieck threatened to not call him into the national team. Clarke then decided to sign with the Edmonton Drillers of the National Professional Soccer League (NPSL). However, the Drillers folded in December 2000, halfway through the NPSL season. The Baltimore Blast then selected Clarke in a dispersal draft. When the Blast were eliminated from the playoffs, he joined the Portland Timbers on February 14, 2001. In 2002, he returned to the Vancouver Whitecaps.

As team captain, he helped the Whitecaps capture their first USL First Division Championship, beating the Rochester Raging Rhinos 3 to 0 in the championship. After the game, he was named the Championship's MVP. On October 12, 2008, he helped the Whitecaps capture their second USL First Division Championship, beating the Puerto Rico Islanders 2–1 in Vancouver but he was released from the team on December 8, 2008.

== International career ==
Clarke played at the 1993 FIFA U-17 World Championship in Japan, in a team alongside Paul Stalteri and Jason Bent. He then also played at the 1997 FIFA World Youth Championship in Malaysia, again with Stalteri and Bent.

He made his senior debut for Canada in an August 1997 friendly match against China. He earned a total of 19 caps, scoring 1 goal. He has represented Canada in 2 FIFA World Cup qualification matches. He was part of Canada's squad that won the 2000 CONCACAF Gold Cup, a first for the nation. In 2000, he was the captain of the Canadian Olympic side as it attempted, but failed to qualify for the 2000 Summer Olympics.

His final international was a May 2002 friendly match against Switzerland.

=== International goals ===
Scores and results list Canada's goal tally first.

#	Date	Venue	Opponent	Score	Result	Competition
1	May 27, 2000	Varsity Stadium, Toronto, Canada	Trinidad and Tobago	1-0	1-0	Friendly match

== Coaching career ==
Clarke served as an assistant coach with Simon Fraser University. He is currently serving as the Technical Director and Director of Operations of Surrey United Soccer Club where he has been since 2009. In his 14 years at Surrey United SC, Jeff has been the driving force behind the SUSC BCSPL Program that has been regarded as one of the top programs in the country with numerous national championships. He has established a club-wide model that has fully integrated player development, academy programs and team development programs as well as levels of play from under 5 years old to over 55-year-old masters programs. Jeff was formerly the Technical Director of the Guildford Athletic Club and was instrumental in rebuilding their soccer program.

== Honours ==
Vancouver Whitecaps FC

- USL First Division Championship: 2006, 2008

St. Patrick's Athletic

- League of Ireland: 1997–98, 1998–99

Canada

- CONCACAF Gold Cup: 2000

Canada U-20

- CONCACAF U-20 Championship: 1996
