= Matt Chulis =

American soccer player-coach (born 1977)

Personal information
- Full name: Matthew Chulis
- Date of birth: August 29, 1977 (age 49)
- Place of birth: Central Islip, New York, United States
- Height: 5 ft 10 in (1.78 m)
- Position: Defender

Youth career
- 1995–1998: University of Virginia

Senior career*
Years	Team	Apps	(Gls)
1999–2000	Columbus Crew	10	(0)
1999	→ MLS Pro 40 (loan)	16	(0)
2000	→ MLS Pro 40 (loan)	9	(0)
2001	Chicago Fire	1	(0)
2001	Portland Timbers	23	(0)
2002–2004	Pittsburgh Riverhounds	61	(2)
2005	Long Island Roughriders	16	(1)

International career
1996–1997	U.S. U-20		
1998–2000	U.S. U-23	8	(0)

Managerial career
- 2006–: Virginia Cavaliers (assistant)
- * Club domestic league appearances and goals

Matt Chulis (born August 29, 1977, in Central Islip, New York) is a retired U.S. soccer defender who is currently associate head coach with the University of Virginia men's soccer team. He was the captain of the U.S. U-20 national team at the 1997 FIFA World Youth Championship. He later played two seasons in Major League Soccer, three seasons in the USL A-League and two in the USL Second Division.

== Youth and college ==
Chulis grew up in Central Islip, New York, playing on the boys’ soccer team at Central Islip High School. During his high school career, he was named both the New York State and New England Regional Player of the Year. He then attended the University of Virginia where he played on the men's soccer team from 1995 to 1998. He started 93 games during his four seasons as a Cavaliers. He was a 1996 and 1997 second team All American. In 1998, he was selected as a first team All American. He was also the 1998 NSCAA Defender of the Year. He graduated in 2005 with a bachelor's degree in sociology.

== Professional ==
In 1999, the Columbus Crew selected Chulis in the first round (ninth overall) of the 1999 MLS College Draft. He spent two seasons in Columbus, seeing time in only ten games. In March 2001, the Crew waived Chulis and he was signed by the Chicago Fire where he played the first game of the season before being waived in April. On May 4, 2001, the Portland Timbers of the USL First Division signed Chulis. On December 7, 2001, the Timbers released Chulis. In April 2002, he signed with the Pittsburgh Riverhounds, playing three seasons there. He finished his career with the Long Island Rough Riders of the USL Second Division in 2005. In 2005, he was selected to the USL-2 second team All Star team.

== National teams ==
In 1996, Chulis joined the U.S. U-20 national team as it prepared for CONCACAF's 1997 FIFA World Youth Championship qualification tournament. The U.S. qualified, and Chulis and his teammates traveled to Malaysia where they were knocked out of the tournament in the second round. Later that year, he played five of six games for the U.S. soccer team which took third place at the 1997 World University Games. He then joined the U.S. U-23 national team. He appeared regularly with the team through 2000, but was not selected to the U.S. team which played in the 2000 Summer Olympics.
