= Charles Adair (soccer) =

American soccer player and coach (born 1971)

Chugger Adair
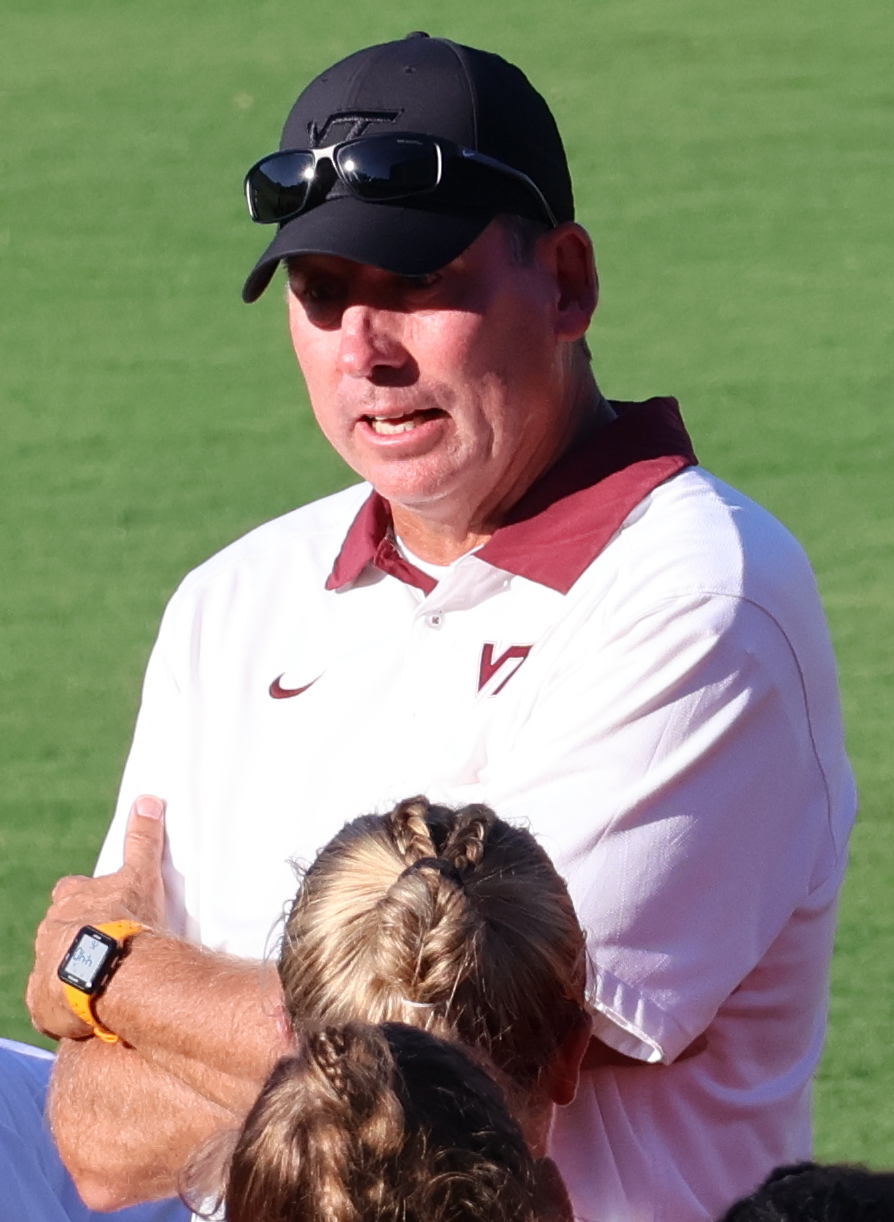
- Adair in 2023

Personal information
- Full name: Charles Russell Adair, Jr.
- Date of birth: August 11, 1971 (age 55)
- Place of birth: Chula Vista, California, U.S.
- Height: 6 ft 5 in (1.96 m)
- Position: Forward

College career
Years	Team	Apps	(Gls)
1989	San Diego State Aztecs		
1990–1992	San Diego Toreros		

Senior career*
Years	Team	Apps	(Gls)
1993	San Diego Sockers (indoor)	6	(10)
1994	Wichita Wings (indoor)	14	(14)
1995	San Diego Sockers (indoor)	18	(11)
1996	Carolina Dynamo	21	(14)
1997	Milwaukee Wave (indoor)	9	(5)
1997	Seattle Sounders	19	(8)
1999–2000	San Diego Flash	28	(8)
2000	Minnesota Thunder	5	(0)
2001	San Diego FC	22	(10)
2002	Portland Timbers	20	(2)
Total		162	(82)

Managerial career
- 1998–2000: San Diego Toreros (assistant)
- 2002: Pacific Boxers (assistant)
- 2003: San Diego Spirit (assistant)
- 2004–2006: UC Santa Barbara Gauchos (assistant)
- 2006–2009: Virginia Tech Hokies (associate head coach)
- 2011–: Virginia Tech Hokies
- * Club domestic league appearances and goals

Charles "Chugger" Adair (born August 11, 1971) is an American former soccer player and current soccer coach. He spent two seasons in the Continental Indoor Soccer League, two in the National Professional Soccer League and seven in the USISL A-League / USL First Division.

== Early life and education ==
Adair grew up in Chula Vista where he played soccer as a youth. When he was five, he underwent open heart surgery. Adair attended Hilltop High School. He was inducted into the Hilltop Hall of Fame in 2001. In 1989, he entered San Diego State University where he played one season with the men's soccer team. He then transferred to the University of San Diego and played with the Toreros for three seasons. In 1992, Adair's senior season, San Diego went to the NCAA championship where they fell to the Virginia Cavaliers. During his three seasons with USD, Adair scored 27 goals and added 23 assists in 57 games.

== Playing career ==
On April 7, 1993, the San Diego Sockers selected Adair in the first round of the 1993 Continental Indoor Soccer League Draft. After scoring ten goals in six games, Adair left the Sockers for a trial with Belgium club Ghent the first week of July. He spent most of his time in Belgium with Ghent's reserve team, but played one exhibition game, scoring a goal, with the first team. When Ghent did not offer him a contract, Adair returned to the Sockers in time for the playoffs. The Sockers went on to win the CISL championship. After going on a post-season tour of Switzerland with the Sockers, Adair signed with the Wichita Wings of the National Professional Soccer League in January 1994. He scored fourteen goals in fourteen games then tore his anterior cruciate ligament in March, putting him out for nearly a year. In June 1995, Adair returned to playing with the Sockers. In March 1996, the Los Angeles Galaxy selected Adair in the third round (26th overall) of the 1996 MLS Supplemental Draft. The Galaxy waived him on March 25, 1996. He then signed with the Carolina Dynamo of the USISL a month later. On February 26, 1997, he signed with the Milwaukee Wave of the NPSL. In April, he moved to the Seattle Sounders of the USISL A-League. He had reconstructive knee surgery and lost the 1998 season. In 1999, he played for the San Diego Flash. He returned for the 2000 season, but recurring knee problems limited him to 91 minutes in five games. The Flash released him in August and he immediately signed with the Minnesota Thunder. In 2001, he was back in San Diego, this time with San Diego FC. In March 2002, he signed with the Portland Timbers.

== Coaching career ==
Before retiring Adair began coaching. In 1996, he coached the Bonita Vista High School boys team. He was assistant coach with the University of San Diego men's team, his alma mater, from 1998 to 2000. He was then the assistant coach of both the men's and women's teams at Pacific University. In 2003, he was assistant coach of the San Diego Spirit women's professional team. Adair was associate head coach of the UC Santa Barbara women's team for two seasons. Adair was the assistant for the women's team at Virginia Tech. In 2011 he was promoted to head coach of the team.

=== Lawsuit over National Anthem Benching ===
In March 2021, Adair was sued by a former player, Kiersten Hening, for allegedly benching her, subjecting her to repeated verbal abuse, and forcing her off the team because she refused to kneel in support of the Black Lives Matter organization. The trial court denied Adair's motion for summary judgment on December 2, 2022, allowing the case to proceed to trial. In January 2023, Adair agreed to pay over $100,000 to settle the lawsuit.
