= Oscar Valentín Leal Caal =

Guatemalan politician

Oscar Valentín Leal Caal (20 February 1971 – 13 January 2012) was a Guatemalan politician. He was elected to the Congress of Guatemala in 2008, and again in 2011 for the Renewed Democratic Liberty party. Shortly before being inaugurated in the new legislature he switched to the Patriotic Party. He was a former Governor of Alta Verapaz, and a former Mayor of San Juan Chamelco.

== Assassination ==
On 13 January 2012, Leal and his brother were shot dead in their car by gunmen riding motorcycles in Guatemala City. The shootings occurred the day before Otto Molina was sworn in as the new President of Guatemala.
