= Hugo Alcaraz-Cuellar =

Mexican footballer and manager (born 1977)

Personal information
- Date of birth: April 6, 1977 (age 49)
- Place of birth: Guadalajara, Mexico
- Height: 5 ft 11 in (1.80 m)
- Position: Midfielder

Youth career
- 1996–1998: Santa Barbara City College
- 1999–2000: Fresno State Bulldogs

Senior career*
Years	Team	Apps	(Gls)
2001	San Diego Flash	18	(6)
2002–2006	Portland Timbers	131	(10)
2007–2008	Seattle Sounders	41	(3)

Managerial career
- 2009–2016: FC Alliance
- 2016–2018: Greater Seattle Surf
- 2018—present: Crossfire Select
- * Club domestic league appearances and goals

Hugo Alcaraz-Cuellar (born April 6, 1977) is a Mexican football manager and former player, who most recently played for the Seattle Sounders of the USL First Division. During his professional career, he also played for the San Diego Flash and the Portland Timbers. In February 2010 he was ranked 15th in the USL First Division Top 25 of the Decade.

== Early life ==
Born in Guadalajara, Jalisco, Alcaraz-Cueller's family moved to Santa Barbara, California when he was three years old. He has four brothers, Armando, Johnny, Luis, and Ricardo. After graduating from Santa Barbara High School, he played soccer first for Santa Barbara City College, then for Fresno State.

== Playing career ==
In 2001, Alcaraz-Cuellar went to an open tryout with the San Diego Flash of the USL A-League. The team was impressed enough to offer him a contract and he spent the 2001 season in San Diego. In San Diego, Alcaraz-Culler quickly established himself as a starter that provided him with a productive debut season where he recorded six goals and tallied 3 assists. The Flash folded at the end of the season and he moved to the Portland Timbers in 2002. Under the management of Bobby Howe, he was deployed as a playmaker for the Timbers. His first prosperous season came in 2003, where he helped the Timbers record the club's third straight winning season including an impressive four-game winning streak. He set the single-season team record for assists at nine. In the 2004 season, Alcaraz-Cuellar contributed by leading the offense with 10 assists that culminated with the Timbers finishing first in the Western Conference, with a record total of 57 points that claimed the league's Regular Season Championship for the first time in the club's 29-year history. However, they were eliminated in the first round of the playoffs by their long-standing rival, the Seattle Sounders. Once the season reached to a conclusion, he was awarded the Assist Leader Statistical Award and received All-League honors. In 2005, the Timbers continued their winning ways and finished the year with their fifth straight winning season. Alcaraz-Cuellar managed to re-set the club's record for assists in a single season, recording 12 assists which placed him to first in the league in assists for the second straight season, becoming the first player in league history to win the honor consecutively. He also earned a second All-League selection. During his tenure with Portland, he also established himself as the Timbers' all-time leader in assists, with 44.

His contract expired in 2006 and the Timbers did not express an interest in re-signing him. Alcaraz-Cueller signed a contract with Cascadian rivals the Seattle Sounders after Adrian Hanauer, owner of the Sounders, and Brian Schmetzer drove to Portland to ask him to sign with Seattle. He selected the number 77 because the number 7 jersey was worn by Leighton O'Brien. In his debut season with the Sounders, he contributed two goals and eight assists, which tied him for second in the league. Alcaraz-Cuellar helped his team win the double by claiming the USL First Division Commissioner's Cup, and his first career USL First Division Championship. At the end of the 2008 campaign, Alcaraz-Cuellar's contract was not renewed by the club and he became a free agent.

== Coaching career ==
In 2009, Alcaraz-Cuellar began his coaching career with the youth soccer club FC Alliance (now known as the Greater Seattle Surf SC), where he championed for the inclusion of low-income children and led fundraisers to cover their membership costs. He left in 2014 to become the head coach of the National Premier Soccer League in their inaugural season. In 2018, he became the Director of Coaching for Crossfire Select youth club.

== Honors ==
=== Club ===
Portland Timbers

- USL First Division Commissioner's Cup: 2004
- Supporters' Player of the Year: 2005 (inaugural awardee)

Seattle Sounders

- USL First Division Championship: 2007
- USL First Division Commissioner's Cup: 2007
- Cascadia Cup: 2007

=== Individual ===
- USL First Division Assist Leader: 2004, 2005
