= Keith Costigan =

Irish soccer commentator and former player

Keith Costigan is an Irish former professional soccer player who now works as a television analyst and commentator for MLS Season Pass on Apple TV. A full-back, he played in the League of Ireland and for the Portland Timbers before a broadcasting career with Fox Sports and the Seattle Sounders.

== Playing career ==
Costigan grew up in Coolock, Dublin, where he played schoolboy football for St. Kevin's Boys and Stella Maris. A left-footed full-back, he played in the League of Ireland for Bohemians and Bray Wanderers. He also played for Monaghan United and trained full-time at Home Farm, then moved to the United States on a scholarship to Augusta State University and later transferred to California State University, Bakersfield.

After graduating, Costigan had a brief spell with Luton Town in England but did not earn a contract. He played two seasons, 2001 and 2002, for the Portland Timbers of the United Soccer Leagues. He had a team-high seven assists in 2001, and in 2002 played a team-high 2,596 minutes in 22 appearances. In the Timbers' off-seasons he trained with the Los Angeles Galaxy. He ended his playing career with the Harrisburg City Islanders in 2004.

== Broadcasting career ==
Costigan began in broadcasting in 2005 at Fox Soccer Channel as the barman on Fox Football Friday, a role his friend Nick Webster, a Fox soccer journalist, recommended him for, before moving into a pundit's role. "I was always the joker of the teams I was a part of, and when I was at Portland I did a lot of interviews with media," says Costigan. He later co-hosted Super Saturday with Webster. He went on to call matches for Fox Sports in Major League Soccer, the Bundesliga, the UEFA Champions League, Liga MX, the Gold Cup and the European Championship.

Costigan joined Seattle Sounders FC for the 2016 season as the play-by-play voice on their regional television broadcasts. He was also the coach of Cal FC, an amateur team based in California that had previously been managed by fellow Fox Sports commentator Eric Wynalda. Costigan left the Sounders broadcast team in 2023 to join Apple TV's national coverage of MLS. In November 2026 SiriusXM named him one of the hosts of Studs Up, a new weekday show on its SiriusXM FC channel.

Costigan has also coached at his alma mater, Cal State Bakersfield, where he was an assistant with the men's team, and at Ventura County Fusion, where he became director of the club's MLS Next academy and, in February 2024, head coach of its USL League Two team.
