= Neil Ryan =

English footballer and coach

Personal information
- Date of birth: 27 January 1975 (age 51)
- Place of birth: Luton, England
- Height: 1.78 m (5 ft 10 in)
- Positions: Midfielder; defender

Team information
- Current team: England U18 (manager)

Youth career
- 1991–1995: Luton Town

Senior career*
Years	Team	Apps	(Gls)
1996	Richmond Kickers	9	(2)
1998	Worcester Wildfire	15	(3)
1998	→ Cape Cod Crusaders (loan)	?	(1)
1998–2000	Wichita Wings (indoor)	58	(6)
2000	Worcester Wildfire	3	(0)
2000	Cape Cod Crusaders	3	(0)
2001	Portland Timbers	6	(0)
2001–2003	Altrincham	47	(2)
2003	Trafford	1	(0)

Managerial career
- 2018–2022: Manchester United U18
- 2022: Manchester United U23 (assistant)
- 2022–2023: England U18
- 2023–2024: England U16
- 2024–2025: England U17
- 2025–2026: England U18
- 2026-: England U16
- * Club domestic league appearances and goals

Neil Ryan is an English football head coach for the England U16s and former player who played as a defender. He played professionally in the United States USL A-League.

The son of former footballer Jimmy Ryan, Neil started his early football career playing at Luton Town in 1991 he was a youth team player for two seasons and eventually turned professional in 1994. His professional contract with Luton ended in 1995 and he then moved to the United States and signed with the Richmond Kickers of the USISL Select League. He then moved through several teams in succession. In 1998, he signed with the Worcester Wildfire, but also played a few games on loan with the Cape Cod Crusaders of the USISL D-3 Pro League. In the fall of 1998, Ryan moved indoors with the Wichita Wings of the National Professional Soccer League. He spent two indoor seasons with the Wings. In 2001, Ryan finished his American career with the Portland Timbers.

In November that year, Ryan returned to England and joined Altrincham F.C. of the semi-professional Northern Premier League. He made his first appearance on 12 December 2001 in the Northern Premier League Challenge Cup. Ryan left Altrincham in September 2003.

In July 2018, after 15 years working through the age groups of U11 to U16 within the Manchester United academy, Ryan was appointed as the head coach of the club's under-18 side.

On 13 May 2022, Ryan was appointed a national coach with England men's teams after 19 years at Manchester United. On 16 August 2022, it was confirmed that Ryan would take charge of the England U18s. On 18 August 2023, he moved across to take charge of the England U16s.

On 23 August 2024, Ryan took charge of the England U17s He progressed across to England U18s on 13 August 2025 and returned as head coach of the U16s on 8 September 2026.
