= Brian Winters (soccer) =

American soccer player

Personal information
- Date of birth: December 31, 1977 (age 48)
- Place of birth: Tacoma, Washington, U.S.
- Height: 5 ft 10 in (1.78 m)
- Positions: Midfielder; defender

Youth career
- 1996–1999: Portland Pilots

Senior career*
Years	Team	Apps	(Gls)
1999	Willamette Valley Firebirds		
2000	Minnesota Thunder	28	(4)
2001–2005	Portland Timbers	127	(0)
Total		155	(4)

International career
1999	US U-23	10	(0)
- * Club domestic league appearances and goals

Brian Winters is an American former soccer player who played professionally in the USL A-League

== Education ==
Winters graduated from Bellarmine Preparatory School. He attended the University of Portland from 1996 to 1999.

== Club ==
He attended the University of Portland, playing on the men's soccer team from 1996 to 1999. In the summer of 1999, he also played for the Willamette Valley Firebirds of the USL Premier Development League. In February 2000, the Columbus Crew selected Winters in the third round (33rd overall) of the 2000 MLS SuperDraft. The Crew released him during the pre-season and Winters signed with the Minnesota Thunder of the USL A-League. In 2001, he returned to Portland when he joined the Portland Timbers, playing for them until 2005.

== International ==
In 1999, Winters earned ten caps with the United States men's national under-23 soccer team as they took third at the 1999 Pan American Games.

== Post-Soccer Career ==
Winters graduated from Oregon Health Sciences University School of Medicine in 2011. He completed his Urology residency at the University of Washington School of Medicine in 2012–2018.
