= Darin Lewis =

Trinidadian soccer player (born 1976)

Personal information
- Date of birth: 28 April 1976 (age 50)
- Place of birth: Tunapuna, Trinidad and Tobago
- Height: 1.75 m (5 ft 9 in)
- Position: Striker

Team information
- Current team: WASA FC
- Number: 9

Youth career
- 1997–1998: Mercer County Community College
- 1999–2000: Connecticut Huskies

Senior career*
Years	Team	Apps	(Gls)
2001	Portland Timbers	7	(0)
2002	MetroStars	3	(0)
2002	Virginia Beach Mariners	11	(0)
- WASA FC
- * Club domestic league appearances and goals

Darin Lewis (born 28 April 1976) is a Trinidadian soccer player who plays for WASA FC.

== Youth ==
The son of former Trinidad and Tobago national football captain Steve Pierre, Lewis attended Mercer County Community College where he was part of Mercer's 1997 and 1998 JUCO soccer championship teams. In 1999, he transferred to the University of Connecticut where he played on the men's soccer team in 1999 and 2000. In 2000, the Huskies won the NCAA Men's Division I Soccer Championship and Lewis was a Second Team All American.

== Professional ==
In June 2001, he signed with the Portland Timbers of the USL A-League. On 1 April 2002, he joined the MetroStars as one of three allowed foreign players. He played three games, one start before going down injured. A week later, a multi-player trade brought in two more foreign players and the MetroStars released Lewis.
