= Abriel (band) =

American metalcore band

- Origin: San Francisco, California, United States
- Genres: Deathcore, Metalcore
- Years active: 2008–2013
- Label: Island Records
- Past members: Alexa Rae; Christian Rey; Mathew McWilliams; Sean Hartman; Jordan Pendergrass; Alex Greenling; Timothy Wrobel; Peter Souza; Chad Evans; Paul Littler; Rick Holbrook
- Website: Abriel on Facebook

Abriel was an American metalcore band based out of San Francisco, California that was formed in 2008. Best known for their female vocals and their "DIY" approach to the industry funding their own tours, album releases, and marketing.

== Overview ==
Originally called From Emperor to Citizen, Abriel was formed at the end of 2008 in San Francisco.

=== Beginning–2009 ===
In August 2007, guitarists Sean Hartman and Tim Wrobel from Fortuna, California decided to move to San Francisco with an arsenal of songs ready to start a band. After another year of going through many drummer and vocalist auditions, near the end of 2008 they found Boston, Massachusetts native Alexa Rae to provide both singing and screaming vocals. This is when the band decided to go with the name Abriel. The band recorded a two-song demo and released the first single, "Show Em' Your Hips", that December. At this time, the band did not have a drummer, so Hartman switched to drums for the first two shows and recorded albums. The band's first show with a full line-up with Alex Greenling on drums and Paul Littler on bass was a San Francisco battle of the bands in January 2009, which they won. The band then did a headlining tour across the West Coast, which garnered attention and earned them a spot on the 2009 Vans Warped Tour where they performed with such bands as A Day to Remember, Chiodos, The Devil Wears Prada, Thrice, and more.

=== 2010–Hiatus ===
After 2009 Warped Tour the band went underground after losing their drummer and bassist, then came back in May 2010 after being asked to play main stage at California Metalfest in Pomona with Bleeding Through. The show brought the band back and got them attention from record labels like Century Media Records and Victory Records. The band decided, even with just a vocalist and two guitarists, that it was time to record an album. The band considered a few known producers but instead chose up and coming metal producer Max Karon to record at his studio in Emeryville, CA, making up for missing band members by adding Max as the bassist and programming drums written by Max and Sean. After the album was finished, the band brought on drummer Chad Evans and Max Karon performed bass on tour throughout the year. The album, "This Will Swallow You Whole", was released on August 19, 2010, with a CD release party at the DNA Lounge in San Francisco. Chad had left the band at the end of the year for personal reason so the band then chose to go on hiatus, even though they had just released their debut album.

=== 2011 Comeback and Island Records ===
Four months after the band went on hiatus, Sean, Tim, and Alexa decided to hold auditions for a new bassist and drummer. After many auditions, the band went with bassist Jordan Pendergrass and drummer Rick Holbrook. The band's first comeback show was headlining in San Francisco on January 31 at Submission with main support from Century Media Records band Arsonists Get All the Girls. On February 7, 2011, Abriel's debut album, This Will Swallow You Whole, was picked up for a one-year digital re-release deal with Island Records. The band once again got asked to play main stage at California Metalfest in Anaheim on March 19, 2011, with As I Lay Dying and Winds of Plague.

=== Relocation-Tim's Departure ===
After the 2011 California Metalfest and a homecoming show for Tim and Sean in Fortuna, CA, Tim decided to exit and move on to another career. He was replaced by guitarist Christian Rey. After performing at the I'm on a Boat Festival on the Queen Mary in Long Beach, CA with All Shall Perish and Iwrestledabearonce, the band decided to relocate to Southern California. In 2012, they were asked to play on the Summer Slaughter with Cannibal Corpse and Between the Buried and Me as well as the final California Metalfest in San Bernardino, CA headlined by Killswitch Engage. The band went into the studio to record a new single "Fort Foster" in Temecula, CA with producer Alex Pappas from the band Finch. The song was released on January 1, 2013.

=== 2013 Final Tour and Split ===
After a string of Southern California shows and an arsenal of new music, Abriel embarked on a headlining tour in the Spring of 2013 ending with the last show ending in Long Beach, CA at the Wild Wild West Fest with The Word Alive and As Blood Runs Black. This would end up being the final show the band would play before disbanding later that year.

== Members ==
Ending line-up

- Alexa Rae (original member) – lead vocals (2008–2013)
- Christian Rey – lead/rhythm guitar (2011–2013)
- Mathew McWilliams – drums (2012–2013)
- Sean Hartman (original member) – rhythm/lead guitar (2009–2013); drums (2008–2009); vocals (2008)
- Jordan Pendergrass – bass (2010–2013)

Previous members

- Timothy Wrobel (original member) – guitar (2008−2011)
- Paul Littler (original member) – bass (2008−2009)
- Alex Greenling – drums (2009–2010)
- Peter Souza – bass (2009−2010)
- Chad Evans – drums (2010)
- Maxwell Karon – bass (touring member) (2010)
- Rick Holbrook – drums (2011)

== Discography ==
| Album title | Date of Release | Label |
|---|---|---|
| Show Em' Your Hips | December 4, 2008 | Single |
| This Will Swallow You Whole | August 19, 2010 | Self-Released |
| This Will Swallow You Whole | Re-released on February 7, 2011 | Island Records/Digital Distribution |
