= Vadim Tolstolutsky =

Kyrgyzstani footballer

Personal information
- Full name: Vadim Viktorovich Tolstolutsky
- Place of birth: Kyrgyzstan
- Position: Midfielder

College career
| Years | Team | Apps | (Gls) |
- Seattle Pacific Falcons

Senior career*
| Years | Team | Apps | (Gls) |
| 2001–2002 | Portland Timbers | 24 | (3) |

International career
- Kyrgyzstan U15
- * Club domestic league appearances and goals

Vadim Viktorovich Tolstolutsky (born in Kyrgyzstan) is a Kyrgyzstani retired footballer.

== Career ==
In 1994, Tolstolutsky parents moved to the United States so that he would have a better chance of playing in college and professionally, settling in Vancouver, Washington. He graduated from Fort Vancouver High School in 1997 and later played for Seattle Pacific University.

In 2001, he was American third division side Portland Timbers's first draft pick. Of Tolstolutsky, then coach Bobby Howe said he probably would not make had he stayed in Kyrgyzstan, because of former Soviet states' tendency to select certain players for development before age 22.

He has been coaching youth teams in Washington state since 2003.

== Personal life ==
He married Paige Laurel Switzer in 2004.
