= Bobby Howe (footballer, born 1945) =

English footballer

Personal information
- Full name: Robert John Howe
- Date of birth: 22 December 1945 (age 80)
- Place of birth: Chadwell St Mary, England
- Positions: Left-back; midfielder

Senior career*
Years	Team	Apps	(Gls)
1966–1971	West Ham United	75	(4)
1971–1973	Bournemouth	100	(6)
1977–1983	Seattle Sounders	11	(0)

Managerial career
- 1977–1983: Seattle Sounders
- 1993: United States U20
- 2001–2005: Portland Timbers
- * Club domestic league appearances and goals

Robert John Howe (born 22 December 1945) is an English former professional footballer who played as a left-back or midfielder.

== Playing career ==
Howe played for West Ham United youth system before progressing through their ranks and appearing in the first team at the age of 21 in 1966. He played at Upton Park until 1971 when he switched to A.F.C. Bournemouth. He played there until his retirement from league football in 1973.

Howe came out of retirement in 1977 to become the player-coach of the Seattle Sounders in the NASL where he played until 1983.

== Coaching career ==
After his playing days were over, Howe become the coach of the United States U-20 men's national soccer team at the 1993 FIFA World Youth Championship and later went on to become the coach of the Portland Timbers from 2001 to 2005. Howe was also in charge of the "Education of Coaches " for the US Soccer Federation. He wrote the preface for " The official playing and coaching manual of the United States Soccer Federation". Howe also had a short stint with the Saint Kitts and Nevis national football team towards the end of 2012 in a consultancy role.

After managing the Portland Timbers, Howe became the Director of Coaching for Emerald City FC youth soccer club in Seattle, Washington. He has served in this role for 11 years. In January 2016, Howe was the 2016 recipient of the "Dr. Thomas Fleck, US Youth Soccer Excellence in Coaching" award.

== Honours ==
=== As a player ===
West Ham

- FA Youth Cup: 1963
- Football League Cup runner-up: 1966

Seattle Sounders

- NASL National Conference: 1977
- NASL Western Division: 1980, 1982
- Trans-Atlantic Challenge Cup: 1981
- Europac Cup: 1982
- Soccer Bowl runner-up: 1977, 1982

=== As a manager ===
Portland Timbers

- Commissioner's Cup: 2004
