= Fadi Afash =

Syrian footballer (born 1974)

Personal information
- Full name: Fadi Afash
- Date of birth: January 4, 1974 (age 52)
- Place of birth: Aleppo, Syria
- Height: 6 ft 0 in (1.83 m)
- Position: Striker

Senior career*
Years	Team	Apps	(Gls)
??–??	Stanislaus County Cruisers	?	(?)
??–2001	Utah Blitzz	?	(?)
2002–2005	Portland Timbers	53	(27)

International career^{‡}
??–??	Syria	?	(?)
- * Club domestic league appearances and goals as of 14:35, 21 January 2007 (UTC) ‡ National team caps and goals as of 14:04, 21 January 2007 (UTC)

Fadi Afash (born 4 January 1974 in Syria) is a former football player, most notably with the Portland Timbers of the USL First Division. Afash is best known among Timbers fans for scoring the "Sunshine Goal", a goal that not only carried a strong emotional connection for many fans but also won the Timbers the 2004 regular-season championship of the USL First Division. On January 22, 2010 he was ranked 15th in the USL Second Division Top 15 of the Decade, which announced a list of the best and most influential players of the previous decade.

== Playing career ==
Afash joined the Timbers in 2002 and played through 2005. For much of this time he was the team's leading striker, scoring 27 goals in 53 appearances. He also had spells with the Stanislaus County Cruisers and the Utah Blitzz, where he was named the 2001 USL D3 Pro League MVP.

== Arrest and conviction ==
In January 2007, Afash was sentenced to 17 months in prison for identity theft and other charges related to the theft of an estimated $138,000 from an elderly Washington couple.
