= Tony McPeak (footballer) =

Scottish footballer

Personal information
- Place of birth: Glasgow, Scotland
- Position: Striker

Youth career
- 1991: Chelsea

Senior career*
Years	Team	Apps	(Gls)
1995–1997	Airdrie	1	(0)
1997–1998	Yee Hope		
1998	Worcester Wildfire		
1999–2000	Milwaukee Wave (indoor)	13	(1)
2001	Portland Timbers	9	(0)
2001–2001	Clydebank	3	(0)
2002–2004	Philadelphia KiXX (indoor)	49	(8)
2004–2005	Baltimore Blast (indoor)	9	(2)
- * Club domestic league appearances and goals

Tony McPeak is a Scottish former professional footballer who played as a striker.

== Career ==
When he was seventeen, McPeak joined Chelsea as a youth player. After sixth months, he returned to Glasgow where he graduated from school. He worked for an insurance company for over two years, playing amateur football on the side. In 1993, he was visiting family in Philadelphia when he met his future wife. McPeak began his career with Airdrie, making one appearance in the Scottish Football League in the 1995–96 season. In August 1997, he signed with Yee Hope in the Hong Kong First Division League and played for the team until April 1998. In February 1998, he was contacted by a scout from the Kansas City Wizards but was unable to gain a green card in time for spring trials. However, he was contacted by John Kerr Jr., head coach of the Worcester Wildfire about playing for his team. Although he had never heard of the Wildfire, he decided to sign with the team because his wife was from Minnesota and this would move her closer to home. In the fall of 1999, McPeak signed with the Milwaukee Wave of the National Professional Soccer League, making his first team debut in December. In 2001, he played nine games for the Portland Timbers of the USL A-League. He then returned to Scotland to play with Clydebank, where he made three league appearances in the 2001–02 season. McPeak then returned to the United States to play with the Philadelphia KiXX of the Major Indoor Soccer League from 2002 to 2004. In October 2004, the KiXX traded McPeak to the Baltimore Blast for a fourth-round selection in the 2005 MISL amateur draft. He played nine games for the Baltimore Blast during the 2004–2005 MISL season.
