= Jesús Ochoa (footballer) =

Mexican soccer player (born 1981)

Personal information
- Full name: Jesús Ochoa Oregel
- Date of birth: October 12, 1981 (age 45)
- Place of birth: Villamar, Mexico
- Height: 5 ft 11 in (1.80 m)
- Position: Midfielder

Team information
- Current team: Los Angeles Blues 23
- Number: 44

Youth career
- 2001: California Baptist Lancers

Senior career*
Years	Team	Apps	(Gls)
2001	Portland Timbers	16	(0)
2002–2003	Los Angeles Galaxy	19	(0)
2002	→ Portland Timbers (loan)	5	(0)
2004	Lagartos de Tabasco		
2005–2006	Chivas USA	16	(0)
2010	Los Angeles Azul Legends	11	(3)
2011–	Los Angeles Blues 23	2	(0)
- * Club domestic league appearances and goals as of May 13, 2011

Jesús Ochoa (born 12 October 1981) is a Mexican professional footballer who currently plays for Los Angeles Blues 23 in the USL Premier Development League.

== Career ==
Ochoa moved to the United States at a young age and was raised in Riverside, California. He then played one season of college soccer with California Baptist University before signing with A-League's Portland Timbers in 2001. In 2002, he joined the Los Angeles Galaxy of Major League Soccer, playing with the club in a limited role through 2003.

After spending 2004 with Mexican club Lagartos de Tabasco, Ochoa returned to play in the MLS in 2005 with Chivas USA. He was released by Chivas in 2006.

After playing for several years in local Los Angeles-area amateur leagues, most notably for the LA Blues, Ochoa signed to play with the Los Angeles Azul Legends in the USL Premier Development League in 2010. He played 11 games and scored 3 goals for the Legends in 2010, before moving to Los Angeles Blues 23 in 2011.

== Personal ==
Ochoa's brother, Sammy Ochoa, has played for United States at the Under-20 level and most recently for Seattle Sounders FC.
