= Mark Baena =

American soccer player

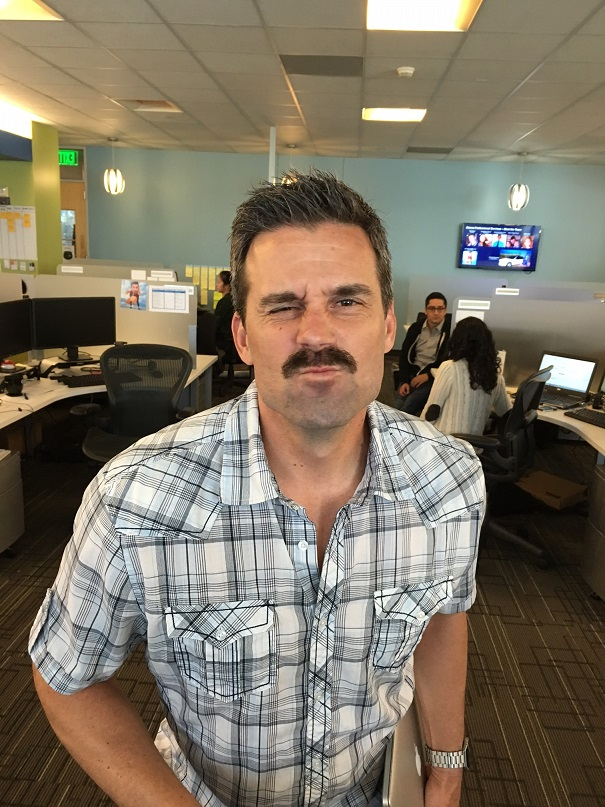

Personal information
- Full name: Mark Baena
- Date of birth: November 27, 1968 (age 57)
- Place of birth: Mountain View, California, United States
- Height: 6 ft 1 in (1.85 m)
- Position: Forward

College career
Years	Team	Apps	(Gls)
1987–1988	De Anza Mountain Lions		
1989–1990	Sacramento State Hornets		

Senior career*
Years	Team	Apps	(Gls)
1991–1995	TuS Hoisdorf	?	(46)
1996	Sacramento Scorpions	6	(5)
1997–1998	California Jaguars	35	(24)
1998–1999	Seattle Sounders	44	(41)
1999	→ San Jose Clash (loan)	0	(0)
2000	San Diego Flash	16	(9)
2001	Portland Timbers	24	(13)
- * Club domestic league appearances and goals

Mark Baena (born November 27, 1968) is an American former professional soccer player. Baena is the highest goalscorer in the history of USL First Division, where he amassed eighty-six goals. He also holds the record for most goals in a season and most points in a season.

== Early life ==
Born in Mountain View, California, Baena attended De Anza College, a two-year community college, located in Cupertino, California. While at De Anza, Baena was named to the All-State team. He then transferred to California State University, Sacramento, where he was the team captain, and All-America candidate and led the team in scoring both seasons. He finished his two years at Sac State with twenty goals. During his time at Sac State, Baena was in the Barcelona Olympics player pool.

== Club career ==
=== Germany ===
In 1992, Baena signed with German Third Division club TuS Hoisdorf. In his three and a half seasons with the team, he scored forty-six goals and assisted another forty-four.

=== USISL ===
In 1995, he left Hoisdorf to return to the U.S. where he joined the Sacramento Scorpions of USISL in 1996. He played only six games with the Scorpions late in the 1996 season before moving to the California Jaguars of the USISL A-League for the 1997 season. Baena scored twenty goals that year, putting him at second on the league's goals and points list. That year he was invited to the Major League Soccer (MLS) combine, but was not drafted. That season Baena was also named to the mid-season All Star team as well as First Team All League. He began the 1998 season with the Jaguars, but was traded to the Seattle Sounders after eight games. He continued his torrid scoring pace in Seattle, this time topping the league's goals list with twenty-four goals in twenty-eight games. Again he was named to both the All Star team and the First Team All League team, as well as earning the league MVP honor. On February 17, 1999, Baena signed a two-year contract with the Sounders. That year, he was called up to the San Jose Clash in June 1999 after three Clash players suffered three injuries in a mid-season friendly with the Sounders. However, Baena never appeared with the Clash. Instead, he returned to the Sounders, tying again for first on the league's goals list and garnering his third straight All Star and third straight First Team All League nod.

On November 9, 1999, the Sounders traded Baena to the San Diego Flash for Michael N’Doumbe, Anthony Farace, cash and San Diego's first two picks in the 2000 draft. In 2000, Baena was continuing his scoring pace, again leading the league in goals (eight goals in ten games) when an ankle injury sidelined him for the second half of the season. He finished the season with nine goals in sixteen games. On March 23, 2001, Baena moved again, joining the Portland Timbers. He had another productive season, scoring thirteen goals in twenty-four games. However, on November 27, 2001, the Timbers released Baena at his request in order to allow him to pursue business opportunities.

In 2003, the USL inducted Baena into the league's Hall of Fame.

=== MLS ===
Baena was approached by Major League Soccer to sign a multi-year contract after each of the 1997, 1998, and 1999 seasons. He joined the draft after the 1997 season, but was not selected due to problems with the contract terms. Baena again could not reach terms with the MLS after the 1998 and 1999 seasons and opted to continue his career in the USISL/A-League (USL). Baena was called up to the San Jose Clash during the 1997 season, but did not appear. Baena was again called up during the 1999 season for a match against the Columbus Crew, but did not appear. Baena's only appearance was in 1999 as a second-half substitute for the San Jose Clash in an exhibition game against UNAM Pumas of the Primera División de México. Baena was in training camp with the San Jose Earthquakes for a very short time during the 2002 pre-season, but opted to remain retired.

== Personal life ==
Baena now works in technology at Google and coaches youth soccer.
