= Portland Timbers (2001–2010) =

Soccer team

- Full name: Portland Timbers
- Nickname: The Timbers
- Founded: July 17, 2000
- Dissolved: 2010 (MLS 2011)
- Stadium: PGE Park; Portland, Oregon
- Capacity: 15,418
- Owners: Portland Family Entertainment (2001–2003); Pacific Coast League (2004–2005); Portland Baseball Investment Group (2006); Shortstop LLC (2007–2010)
- President: Marshall Glickman (2001); Mark Schuster (2002–2003); Tom Lasley (2004 interim); John Cunningham (2005–2006); Merritt Paulson (2007–2010)
- Head coach: Bobby Howe (2001–2005)
- League: A-League (2001–2004); USL First Division (2005–2009); USSF Division 2 Professional League (2010)
Home colors	Away colors	Third colors

The Portland Timbers were an American professional soccer team based in Portland, Oregon, United States. Founded in 2001, the team played in various leagues at the second tier of the American Soccer Pyramid, including the USL First Division and the USSF Division 2 Professional League, until the end of the 2010 season.

On March 20, 2009, Major League Soccer commissioner Don Garber announced an expansion team had been granted to the Portland area and would retain the Timbers name. The new team began play in MLS in 2011.

The team played its home games at what was then known as PGE Park (now known as Providence Park, the home of the current MLS team). The team's colors are green and white. The team also had a development team, Portland Timbers U23s, which won the Premier Development League championship in 2010 and is currently affiliated with the MLS team.

== History ==
This incarnation of the Timbers is the third in US soccer history. They took the name of the original franchise that played in the North American Soccer League (NASL) from 1975 to 1982.

=== Timbers I: North American Soccer League ===
In 1974, the North American Soccer League awarded an expansion franchise to Portland, Oregon. The new team, named the Timbers, began play in the 1975 season. In their inaugural season, the Timbers went to the championship game Soccer Bowl but lost to the Tampa Bay Rowdies 2–0. It was during this magical season that the Timbers endeared themselves to the City and Portland became known as "Soccer City USA". While the Timbers boasted some of the league's best fan support, they sometimes struggled on the field. Despite going to the championship game in their first season, they missed the playoffs in 1976 and 1977. In 1978, they went to the Conference Finals before falling to the New York Cosmos. The team folded at the end of the 1982 season as player salaries outpaced team revenue. These Timbers established soccer as a sport in the greater Portland area. Their legacy lives on in the current Timbers following and the many thousands who continue to play and follow the game. Many of these Timbers continued to live in the area after their playing careers and helped establish the soccer as a vital local sport.

=== Timbers II: WSA/APSL ===
In 1985, a local amateur Portland club, F.C. Portland, became a charter member of the Western Soccer Alliance (WSA). In 1989, the team adopted the name Portland Timbers, becoming the second Timbers team and the WSA became the Western Soccer League (WSL). This time the Timbers lasted only two years, 1989 and 1990, before folding. However, in 1990, the WSL merged with the American Soccer League to form the American Professional Soccer League the predecessor of the A-League. While this iteration of the Timbers lasted only two years, it had five significant players, national team goalkeeper and University of Portland alumnus, Kasey Keller; former NASL Timbers player John Bain, who also coached the team; Scott Benedetti who would return as a star of the A-League/USL Timbers; future MLS player Shawn Medved; and finally Peter Hattrup who is best known as a member of the Seattle Sounders.

=== Timbers III: United Soccer Leagues ===
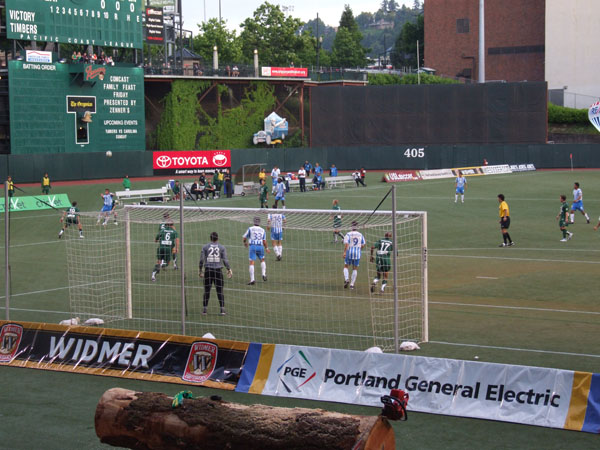
Portland Timbers

Through the 2003 season, the Timbers compiled an inconsistent record, qualifying for league playoffs two out of the three years. They did, however, established themselves as one of the best-drawing teams in the A-League, averaging attendance above 5,000 in each of their four years of existence.

In the 2004 season, the Timbers finished first in the Western Conference, with a record of 18 wins, 7 losses, and 3 draws (57 points). However, they were eliminated in the first round of the playoffs by their long-standing rival, the Seattle Sounders.

2005 proved to be a bittersweet year for the Portland Timbers. A sweet end of the year playoff run ended by a bitter playoff loss once again to arch-rival Seattle Sounders. However, many exciting moments went along with the 2005 season, including a 6–1 thumping of the Atlanta Silverbacks on September 8, 2005; Portland being the only team to give the Montreal Impact a home loss, and Timbers players Scot Thompson, Hugo Alcaraz-Cuellar, and Dan Antoniuk winning league awards.

2006 was a very disappointing season for many reasons for the Portland Timbers, and their fans. The team finishing tied for last in the table with a franchise worst 7–15–6 (27 points) record, the Offensive production was last in the league as the club only netted 25 goals, and the Timbers lost their derby with heated rival Seattle Sounders.

2007 had many moments for the Timbers. Portland finished second in the league, with first going to rival Seattle Sounders. They enjoyed successful friendlies against Preston North End (2–1), Club Necaxa (1–0) and Toronto FC (4–1) while drawing even with the A.C. Milan Primavera squad (1–1) and winning on penalties, and went unbeaten at home during the regular season.

2008 was a disappointing year to most Timbers' fans for many reasons, although this was offset by the record high season attendances. The team finished dead last with a 7–13–10 record, scored a league worst 26 goals, while conceding 33. However, the 2008 Portland Timbers attendance grew 25.5% averaging 8,567 spectators (second in the USL-1 behind Montreal Impact), and Cameron Knowles won an All-League Second Team spot. On November 21, 2008, Amos Magee was named Director of Soccer Development for the Timbers.

2009 was a record setting season for the Timbers. They went unbeaten for a USL-1 record 24 matches in a row, which started following a 1–0 loss to Vancouver in the first game of the season, and ended with a Sep 3 defeat to Rochester Rhinos at PGE Park. They finished their season at the top of the table (16-4-10 58 points) winning The Commissioner's Cup and a first round bye in the playoffs. With their 3–1 victory over the Miami FC Blues, the Timbers also were the first team to clinch a playoff spot in the 2009 season. The Timbers were eliminated from the playoffs in their first two games (1–2, 3–3) on goal aggregate to Cascadia rival Vancouver Whitecaps.

== List of seasons ==
This is a complete list of seasons for the USL franchise. For a season-by-season history including the current Portland Timbers MLS franchise, see List of Portland Timbers seasons.

Season	League											Position		Playoffs	USOC	Continental	Average attendance	Top goalscorer(s)	
Season	Div	League	Pld	W	L	D	GF	GA	GD	Pts	PPG	Conf.	Overall	Playoffs	USOC	Continental	Average attendance	Name	Goals
2001	2	A-League	26	13	10	3	41	38	+3	42	1.62	4th	10th	QF	QR1	Ineligible	5,974	(United States) Mark Baena	15
2002	2	A-League	28	13	12	3	47	39	+8	42	1.50	4th	8th	R1	QR1	Ineligible	6,261	(Syria) Fadi Afash (United States) McKinley Tennyson	18
2003	2	A-League	28	15	11	2	39	33	+6	47	1.68	5th	10th	DNQ	QR1	Ineligible	5,871	(Mexico) Byron Alvarez	12
2004	2	A-League	28	18	7	3	58	30	+28	57	2.04	1st	1st	QF	R4	Ineligible	5,281	(Mexico) Byron Alvarez	18
2005	2	USL-1	28	10	9	9	40	42	−2	39	1.39	N/A	5th	QF	R4	Ineligible	5,553	(United States) Dan Antoniuk	14
2006	2	USL-1	28	7	15	6	25	39	–14	27	0.96	N/A	11th	DNQ	R3	Ineligible	5,575	(United States) Luke Kreamalmeyer	9
2007	2	USL-1	28	14	5	9	32	18	+14	51	1.82	N/A	2nd	SF	R2	Ineligible	6,794	(United States) Andrew Gregor	9
2008	2	USL-1	30	7	13	10	26	33	–7	31	1.03	N/A	11th	DNQ	R1	DNQ	8,567	(United States) Chris Brown	9
2009	2	USL-1	30	16	4	10	45	19	+26	58	1.93	N/A	1st	SF	R3	DNQ	9,734	(Guinea) Mandjou Keita	14
2010	2	D2 Pro	30	13	7	10	34	23	+11	46	1.63	3rd	3rd	QF	R3	DNQ	10,727	(United States) Ryan Pore	15
Total	–	–	284	126	93	65	387	314	+73	440	1.55	–	–	–	–	—	–	(Mexico) Byron Alvarez	43

1. Avg. attendance include statistics from league matches only.
2. Top goalscorer(s) includes all goals scored in League, League Playoffs, U.S. Open Cup, CONCACAF Champions League, FIFA Club World Cup, and other competitive continental matches.
3. Points and PPG have been adjusted from non-traditional to traditional scoring systems for seasons prior to 2003 to more effectively compare historical team performance across seasons.

== Honors ==
- A-League Championship
  - The Commissioner's Cup: Western Division Champions (1): 2004
- USL First Division Regular Season Champions
  - The Commissioner's Cup: 2009

== Head coaches ==
- (England) Bobby Howe (2001–2005)
- (United States) Chris Agnello (2006)
- (New Zealand) Gavin Wilkinson (2007–2010)

== Stadium ==
- PGE Park; Portland, Oregon (2001–2010)

== Club culture ==
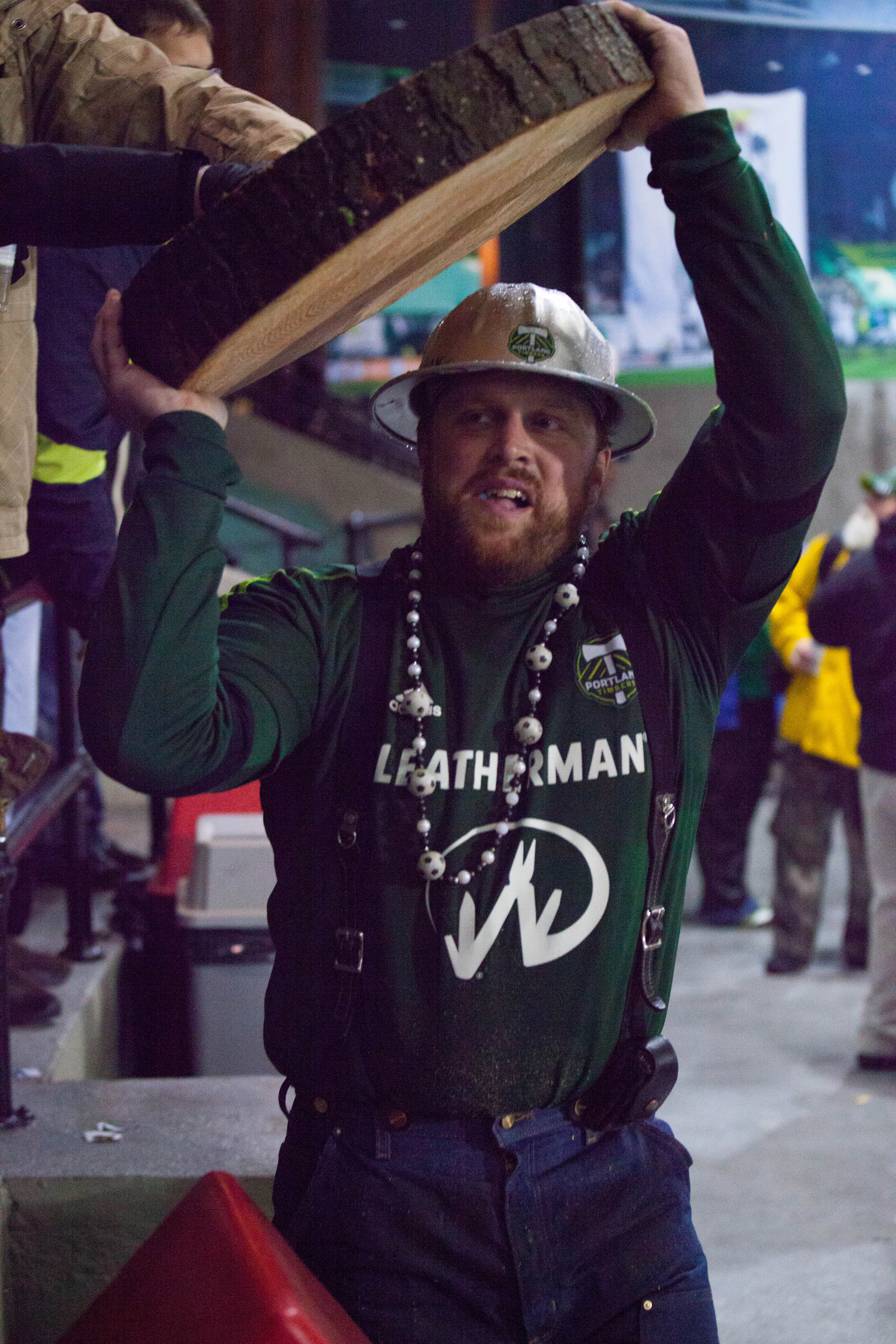
Timber Joey displaying the slice of wood chopped during a match to celebrate each Timbers goal.

=== Fans ===
The Timbers Army is the center of fan support, and the Timbers with a number of rousing choruses. There are many other groups that occupy the North End (Woodshed) of Providence Park, some who are a part of the Timbers Army, and some who are not. The team mascot is currently Timber Joey, the replacement for Timber Jim who retired in 2008, a lumberjack who wields a live chainsaw around the field, cutting off a slab of a log each time the team scores.

=== Club rivalries ===
Portland Timbers have rivalries with their Pacific Northwest opponents Seattle Sounders and Vancouver Whitecaps. All three teams traditionally compete in the three way Cascadia Cup derby, although in 2009 Seattle moved to the MLS as Seattle Sounders FC, so for two years (2009–2010) the Cascadia Cup was a two-team derby. The three way rivalry was resumed in 2011, when Vancouver and Portland joined Seattle in the MLS.

=== Mascot ===
The team's mascot was a grizzled lumberjack named Timber Jim (aka: Jim Serrill). On January 24, 2008, Jim announced his retirement. His final farewell was a game played against Puerto Rico Islanders on April 17, 2008, the Timbers home opener, which was won 1–0. Having served as the unofficial mascot every game starting the second home game of the season, on June 14, 2008, Timber Joey was inaugurated as the new official mascot at an exhibition game vs Juventus Primavera, a game the Timbers won 1–0.

== Kit sponsors ==
Year	Kit sponsor	Main sponsor
2001–2003	Umbro	OregonLive.com
2004	Nike	OregonLive.com
2005–2009	Nike	Toyota
2010	Nike	SolarWorld
