= All-time Richmond Kickers roster =

This list comprises all players who have participated in at least one league match for the Richmond Kickers since the USL began keeping archived records in 2003. Players who were on the roster but never played a first team game are not listed; players who appeared for the team in other competitions (US Open Cup, CONCACAF Champions League, etc.) but never actually made a USL appearance are noted at the bottom of the page where appropriate.

A "†" denotes players who only appeared in a single match.

A "*" denotes players who are known to have appeared for the team prior to 2003.

== A ==
- (United States) Trey Alexander
- (Bulgaria) Dian Anguelov *
- (United States) Steve Ankiel

== B ==
- (Sierra Leone) Shaka Bangura
- (Canada) Ian Bennett
- (United States) Matt Bobo
- (England) Chris Brown
- (New Zealand) Tim Brown
- (United States) David Bulow
- (Romania) Adrian Bumbut
- (United States) Michael Burke
- (Uganda) Peter Byaruhanga

== C ==
- (United States) Michael Callahan
- (United States) Danny Care *
- (United States) Chris Carrieri
- (United States) Brian Carroll
- (United States) Anthony Catalano
- (Liberia) McColm Cephas
- (United States) Adam Chavez
- (England) Leigh Cowlishaw
- (United States) Kenny Cutler

== D ==
- (Jamaica) Fabian Dawkins
- (England) Matthew Delicâte
- (Canada) Dwayne De Rosario *
- (United States) John DiRaimondo
- (United States) Keith Donohue *
- (Brazil) Gerson dos Santos
- (Ukraine) Ihor Dotsenko
- (United States) Eric Dutt

== E ==
- (United States) Kevin Edwards
- (United States) Edson Elcock
- (Haiti) Derrick Etienne Sr. *

== F ==
- (United States) Armando Femia
- (England) Dennis Fenemore
- (United States) Marco Ferruzzi *
- (United States) Bobby Foglesong
- (United States) Chris Fox

== G ==
- (United States) John Gilkerson
- (United States) Daryl Gomez
- (United States) Ray Goodlett
- (Germany) Sascha Görres

== H ==
- (United States) Evan Harding
- (United States) Tim Hardy
- (United States) Jeff Hare
- (United States) Ed Hayden
- (United States) David Hayes
- (United States) Ryan Heins
- (United States) Josh Henderson
- (United States) Will Hesmer
- (Japan) Nozomi Hiroyama
- (United States) Charlie Howe
- (England) Ben Hunter

== J ==
- (Kuwait) Nowaf Jaman
- (United States) Kevin Jeffrey
- (United States) Kelvin Jones
- (England) Ryan Jones

== K ==
- (Uganda) Henry Kalungi
- (England) Steve Kinsey *
- (United States) Kevin Knight
- (Ghana) Adu-Gyamfi Kwaku *

== L ==
- (United States) John Latting
- (United States) Paul Lekics
- (United States) Cecil Lewis
- (United States) Peter Luzak

== M ==
- (United States) Pete Marino †*
- (Scotland) Ross MacKenzie
- (Cameroon) Matthew Mbuta
- (United States) Trevor McEachron
- (United States) Andrew Metcalf
- (United States) Ruben Mingo
- (United States) Brian Morris
- (United States) Mark Murphy
- (United States) Bret Myers

== N ==
- (United States) Bryan Namoff
- (Romania) Cristian Neagu
- (United States) Caleb Norkus
- (Ghana) Theophidack Nti
- (Zimbabwe) Stanley Nyazamba

== O ==
- (United States) Matthew O'Toole

== P ==
- (United States) Ralph Pace
- (United States) Ronnie Pascale
- (United States) Eliot Paschalis
- (United States) Matthew Pauls
- (United States) Anthony Peters
- (England) Matthew Pilkington

== R ==
- (United States) David Rosenbaum
- (United States) Jason Russell
- (England) Neil Ryan

== S ==
- (United States) Ricky Schramm
- (United States) Gregory Simmonds
- (United States) Clyde Simms
- (United States) Freddie Smith
- (Uganda) Robert Ssejjemba
- (United States) Khary Stockton
- (United States) Benjamin Strawbridge
- (United States) Dustin Swinehart

== T ==
- (United States) David Testo
- (United States) Jeremy Tolleson †

== U ==
- (United States) Rob Ukrop

== V ==
- (United States) Luke Vercollone
- (United States) Joseph Vidmar
- (United States) Patrick Viray

== W ==
- (United States) Jamel Wallace
- (United States) Mali Walton
- (United States) Doug Warren
- (England) Matt Watson
- (Cameroon) Yomby William
- (United States) Anthony Williams
- (United States) Paul Williams
- (United States) Richie Williams
- (United States) Tony Williams
- (United States) Steven Wolfe
- (United States) Joey Worthen

== Sources ==
- "USL-2 Team History". uslsoccer.com. United Soccer Leagues. Archived from the original on 2013-02-05.
