= 2009 Richmond Kickers season =

Richmond Kickers
2009 season
- Head coach: Leigh Cowlishaw
- USL Second Division: Second
- U.S. Open Cup: First round
- USL Second Division Playoffs: Champions

The 2009 Richmond Kickers season was their seventeenth season overall and their fourth season in the USL Second Division.

== Roster ==
As of February 24, 2013.

Note: Flags indicate national team as defined under FIFA eligibility rules; some limited exceptions apply. Players may hold more than one non-FIFA nationality.

No.	Pos.	Nation	Player
2	DF	CMR	Yomby William
3	DF	USA	Anthony Peters
4	MF	USA	Luke Vercollone
5	DF	USA	Kelvin Jones
7	FW	ENG	Matthew Delicâte
8	FW	USA	Joey Worthen
9	MF	USA	Adrian Bumbut
10	FW	USA	David Bulow
11	DF	ENG	Benjamin Hunter
12	FW	USA	David Rosenbaum
15	MF	USA	Evan Harding
16	MF	USA	Chris Carrieri

No.	Pos.	Nation	Player
16	DF	USA	Jeremy Tolleson
17	MF	USA	Kenny Cutler
18	MF	BRA	Gerson dos Santos
19	MF	USA	Michael Burke
21	MF	SCO	Ross MacKenzie
22	GK	USA	Ronnie Pascale
23	DF	GER	Sascha Görres
24	FW	CMR	Matthew Mbuta
25	DF	UGA	Henry Kalungi
26	MF	ENG	Leigh Cowlishaw
27	MF	USA	Edson Elcock
29	MF	USA	John DiRaimondo

== Overall standings ==
USL Second Division
Pos	Team	Pld	W	L	T	GF	GA	GD	Pts	Qualification
1	Wilmington Hammerheads	20	12	5	3	42	24	+18	39	Regular season champion
2	Richmond Kickers (C)	20	11	3	6	39	18	+21	39	Playoff spot clinched
3	Harrisburg City Islanders	20	9	7	4	31	23	+8	31	Playoff spot clinched
4	Charlotte Eagles	20	8	5	7	40	28	+12	31	Playoff spot clinched
5	Real Maryland Monarchs	20	8	10	2	22	31	−9	26	Playoff spot clinched
6	Crystal Palace Baltimore	20	6	9	5	16	20	−4	23	
7	Western Mass Pioneers	20	6	9	5	21	34	−13	23	
8	Pittsburgh Riverhounds	20	6	10	4	18	27	−9	22	
9	Bermuda Hogges	20	4	12	4	19	43	−24	16	

(C) Playoff Champion

== Match results ==
=== USL Second Division ===
Home team is listed on the left.

==== Regular season ====
April 18, 2009 1	Richmond Kickers	2–2	Harrisburg City Islanders	Richmond, VA
19:00 EDT	Delicâte 16'; Bulow 76'; Bumbut (yellow card) 73'	Report	Fisher 23'; Odour 43'; Velten (yellow card) 48'; Schofield (yellow card) 56'; Bixler (yellow card) 57'; Calvano (yellow card) 72'	Stadium: University of Richmond Stadium; Attendance: 2893; Referee: Shaun Papperman

April 25, 2009 2	Richmond Kickers	1–1	Pittsburgh Riverhounds	Richmond, VA
19:00 EDT	Worthen 36'	Report	Jerome 40'; Hayden (yellow card) 48'; Riley (red card) 56'	Stadium: University of Richmond Stadium; Attendance: 2887; Referee: Mike Andrews

May 2, 2009 3	Western Mass Pioneers	0–2	Richmond Kickers	Ludlow, Massachusetts
19:30 EDT	Bulow 6'; Delicâte 46'	Report	Nerkowski (yellow card) 33'; Clark (yellow card) 44'	Stadium: Lusitano Stadium; Attendance: 1847; Referee: Guile Gonzalez

May 9, 2009 4	Bermuda Hogges	1–0	Richmond Kickers	Hamilton, Bermuda
19:00 EDT	Coddington 25'; Shakir (yellow card) 48'	Report		Stadium: Bermuda National Stadium; Attendance: 1160; Referee: Bryan Rosland

May 15, 2009 5	Richmond Kickers	1–1	Charlotte Eagles	Richmond, Virginia
19:00 EDT	Delicate 16'	Report	Shak (yellow card) 40'; Martins 84'; Herrera (yellow card) 90'; Williams (yellow card) 90'	Stadium: City Stadium; Attendance: 1842; Referee: Mark Gorak

May 23, 2009 6	Richmond Kickers	1–1	Crystal Palace Baltimore	Richmond, Virginia
19:00 EDT	Bumbut 46'; Yomby (yellow card) 84'; Delicate (yellow card) 88'; MacKenzie (yellow card) 90'	Report	Nusum (yellow card) 22'; Teixeira 30'; Basso (yellow card) 48'; Harada (yellow card) 80'; Flores (yellow card) 81'; Marshall (yellow card) 84'	Stadium: City Stadium; Attendance: 2576; Referee: John Schmitz

May 30, 2009 7	Richmond Kickers	2–0	Western Mass Pioneers	Richmond, Virginia
19:00 EDT	Delicate 22'; Bulow 67'	Report	McGarry (yellow card) 23'; Tyrie (yellow card) 44'; Lima (yellow card) 87'	Stadium: City Stadium; Attendance: 2223; Referee: Kai Goodrich

June 6, 2009 8	Richmond Kickers	5–0	Harrisburg City Islanders	Richmond, Virginia
19:00 EDT	Bumbut 16'; 37' (o.g.); Bulow 54', 56'; MacKenzie 82'	Report	Pelletier (yellow card) 34'	Stadium: City Stadium; Attendance: 3538; Referee: Jim Sadowski

June 13, 2009 9	Real Maryland F.C.	1–0	Richmond Kickers	Rockville, Maryland
18:00 EDT	Brooks 47'	Report	Burke (red card) 27'; MacKenzie (yellow card) 88'	Stadium: Richard Montgomery High School; Attendance: 512; Referee: Michael Donovan

June 14, 2009 10	Pittsburgh Riverhounds	0–2	Richmond Kickers	Pittsburgh, Pennsylvania
19:05 EDT		Report	Delicate 45'; Kalungi (yellow card) 56'; DiRaimondo 71'	Stadium: Chartiers Valley High School; Attendance: 1289; Referee: Dino Sorbara

June 20, 2009 11	Charlotte Eagles	2–2	Richmond Kickers	Charlotte, North Carolina
19:00 EDT	Jorge Herrera 38'; 55' (o.g.)	Report	DiRaimondo 12' (pen.); Bryant (yellow card) 12'; Bumbut 15'; Williams (yellow card) 90'	Stadium: Charlotte Christian Stadium; Attendance: 780; Referee: Dino Sorbara

June 26, 2009 12	Pittsburgh Riverhounds	1–2	Richmond Kickers	Pittsburgh, Pennsylvania
20:05 EDT	Jerome (yellow card) 5' (goal) 21'; Katic (yellow card) 48'; Hayden (yellow card) 63'	Report	Delicate 6', 33'; Burke (yellow card) 34'; Worthen (yellow card) 45'	Stadium: Edinoboro University Stadium; Attendance: 1518; Referee: Shawn Fitch

July 4, 2009 13	Richmond Kickers	3–0	Harrisburg City Islanders	Richmond, Virginia
19:00 EDT	Bulow 10', 39'; Burke (yellow card) 28' dos Santos 34'; Yomby (red card) 43'	Report		Stadium: City Stadium; Attendance: 3577; Referee: Mark Gorak

July 11, 2009 14	Richmond Kickers	7–2	Bermuda Hogges	Richmond, Virginia
19:00 EDT	Bulow 8', 14'; Delicate 13', 81' (pen.); Burke 26'; Hunter 32'; Carrieri 51'; Kalungi (yellow card) 77'	Report	Cox (yellow card) 13'; Holder 61' (pen.); Smith 73'; Peniston (yellow card) 81'	Stadium: City Stadium; Attendance: 2464; Referee: Kai Goodrich

July 18, 2009 15	Crystal Palace Baltimore	1–2	Richmond Kickers	Baltimore, Maryland
19:00 EDT	Harkin (yellow card) 32'; Basso (yellow card) 55'; Harada (yellow card) 82'; Seabrook 88'	Report	Burke (yellow card) 36'; Worthen 61'; Delicate 76'	Stadium: University of Maryland, Baltimore County; Attendance: 567; Referee: John McCloskey

July 22, 2009 16	Wilmington Hammerheads	3–2	Richmond Kickers	Wilmington, North Carolina
19:00 EDT	Tate (yellow card) 23'; Franks 59'; Hufstader 67'; Budnyy 75'	Report	Bulow (yellow card) 36'; Delicate 72'; Burke 87'	Stadium: Legion Sports Complex; Attendance: 1976; Referee: Abbas Piran

July 29, 2009 17	Harrisburg City Islanders	0–1	Richmond Kickers	Harrisburg, Pennsylvania
19:05 EDT	Bixler (yellow card) 41'; Baker (yellow card) 64'	Report	Hunter 42'; Hunter (yellow card) 55'; Vercollone (yellow card) 56'; Worthen (yellow card) 63'	Stadium: Skyline Sports Complex; Attendance: 1191; Referee: Ed Marco

August 1, 2009 18	Richmond Kickers	1–0	Real Maryland F.C.	Richmond, Virginia
19:00 EDT	Vercollone (yellow card) 24'; Burke 41'; Goerres (yellow card) 90'	Report	Taylor (yellow card) 13'; Borajo (yellow card) 39'	Stadium: City Stadium; Attendance: 2727; Referee: Mark Kadlecik

August 8, 2009 19	Wilmington Hammerheads	0–1	Richmond Kickers	Wilmington, North Carolina
19:00 EDT	Walters (yellow card) 40'	Report	Goerres (yellow card) 34'; Worthen 55'; Jones (yellow card) 89'	Stadium: Legion Stadium; Attendance: 3315; Referee: Danny Thornberry

August 15, 2009 20	Richmond Kickers	2–2	Wilmington Hammerheads	Richmond, Virginia
19:00 EDT	Delicate 30', 61'; Carrieri (yellow card) 31'	Report	Briggs (yellow card) 15'; Solle 27'; Noviello 73'; Tatters (yellow card) 90'	Stadium: City Stadium; Attendance: 4010; Referee: Shawn Fitch

==== Playoffs ====
August 22, 2009 1	Richmond Kickers	1–0	Harrisburg City Islanders	Richmond, Virginia
19:00 EDT	Worthen (yellow card) 32'; Hunter (yellow card) 117'; Delicate 120'	Report	Baker (yellow card) 43'; Velten (yellow card) 63'	Stadium: City Stadium; Attendance: 1923; Referee: Mike Andrews

August 29, 2009 2	Richmond Kickers	3–1	Charlotte Eagles	Richmond, Virginia
19:00 EDT	Elcock 63'; DiRaimondo 83'; Bulow 86' (pen.)	Report	Martins 14'; Nunes (yellow card) 41'; Williams (yellow card) 46'; Ceus (yellow card) 85'	Stadium: City Stadium; Attendance: 2991; Referee: Tony Russo

=== U.S. Open Cup ===
May 2, 2009 1	Carolina RailHawks (North Carolina)	2–1	(Virginia) Richmond Kickers	Raleigh, North Carolina
19:00 EDT	Bulow 20'; Kalungi (yellow card) 59'	Report	Paladini 14'; Diallo 48'; McKenney (yellow card) 54'; Kabwe (yellow card) 76'	Stadium: WakeMed Soccer Park; Attendance: 1362

=== International Friendly ===
July 25, 2009	Richmond Kickers (United States)	1–0	(Guatemala) Comunicaciones	Richmond, Virginia
19:00 EDT	Carrieri (yellow card) 32'; Elcock 62'	Report	Monterroso (yellow card) 16'; Castrillo (yellow card) 28'	Stadium: City Stadium; Attendance: 2,192; Referee: Andrew Chapin

== See also ==
- Richmond Kickers
- 2009 in American soccer
- 2009 U.S. Open Cup
