= 2012 Richmond Kickers season =

Richmond Kickers
2012 season
- Owner: Rob Ukrop
- Head coach: Leigh Cowlishaw
- Stadium: City Stadium
- USL Pro: 4th
- USL Pro Playoffs: First round
- U.S. Open Cup: Third round
- Highest home attendance: 5,014 vs. D.C. United (May 29; U.S. Open Cup)
- Lowest home attendance: 2,273 vs. Harrisburg (May 12; USL Pro Regular Season)
- Average home league attendance: League: 2,433; Playoffs: 1,441; Cup: 5,014
Home colors	Away colors	Third colors

The 2012 Richmond Kickers season was the club's twentieth season of existence. It was the Kicker's sixth-consecutive year in the third-tier of American soccer, playing in the USL Professional Division for their second season.

After a slow start for the first two-thirds of the regular season, a four-match winning streak catapulted the Kickers into the top half of the table, thus qualifying them for the playoffs, making it the ninth consecutive season that the Kickers made the playoffs of any league they were participating in. In the first round of the playoffs, Richmond lost 3–2 by the Wilmington Hammerheads thus ending their postseason ambitions.

Richmond also reached the third round of the 2012 U.S. Open Cup, where in extra time, they lost to Major League Soccer side, D.C. United.

== Background ==
The 2011 campaign marked the Kickers' debut in the newly created USL Pro League, which assumed the role as the third division of American soccer. During the regular season, Richmond finished third in their division and third in the overall table, making it the first time since 2005 that the Kickers did not finish the regular season either as the regular season champion or finalist. In the playoffs, the Kickers were eliminated by Commissioner's Cup winners and eventual USL Pro champions, Orlando City.

Outside of league play, Richmond made one of their deepest runs in the U.S. Open Cup, the domestic knockout cup competition. The Kickers reached the semifinals of the tournament after knocking out two Major League Soccer clubs, Columbus Crew and Sporting Kansas City in the third round and quarterfinals, respectively. The last time Richmond reached the semifinals of the Open Cup was in 1995, when the Kickers won their lone U.S. Open Cup title.

Off the field, the Kicker organization posted their fourth highest average attendance in club history.

== Review ==
=== Offseason ===
On December 6, 2011, the Kickers signed Pittsburgh Riverhounds' Jason Yeisley on a free transfer.

From January 20–22, the Kickers hosted their fourteenth player combine and had open tryouts.

On January 30, 2012, the club announced their preseason schedule, which included fixtures against several local college soccer teams.

=== Preseason ===
The Kickers are expected to begin preseason training camp in February.

=== April ===
The Richmond Kickers opened the regular season with home and away fixtures against long-time rivals, Charleston Battery, and the defending USL Pro regular season and postseason champions, Orlando City, earning a win, a draw and two losses during the four-match span. Richmond's home opener was on April 7 against Charleston in front of a crowd of 5,009. The Kickers suffered a 2–1 home defeat to the Battery thanks to a pair of goals from Charleston's Jose Cuevas, who netted in the 41st and 67th minutes of the match. The Kickers lone goal came from Stanley Nyazamba, who tallied for the home side in the 65th minute. The following weekend, the Kickers traveled south to Charleston, South Carolina to play the Battery at their home venue, Blackbaud Stadium. In front of a sold-out crowd of 4,729, the Kickers earned a last-minute, 2–1 victory over the Battery thanks to a goal from longtime defender, Sascha Görres. The Kickers' other goal came from Nyazamba, who netted his second of the campaign.

On April 21, the Kickers returned home to take on the defending USL Pro champions, Orlando City, who had been hot off a 2–0–0 start. In front of a crowd of 3,169; the Kickers were shutout at home by Orlando, as they suffered a second-straight home defeat, losing 2–0 in the process. City's two goals both came in the second half off a 61st-minute strike from Luke Boden, and an 89th minute penalty kick from Anthony Pulis. The return leg was the following weekend, where Richmond ended Orlando's six-matching winning streak (including last season), where the Kickers drew City 0–0 at the Citrus Bowl in Orlando, Florida.

== Competitions ==
=== Preseason ===
February 25, 2012 Preseason 1	Richmond Kickers	3–0	James Madison Dukes	Richmond, Virginia
18:30 EDT				Stadium: Ukrop Park

March 3, 2012 Preseason 2	Richmond Kickers	1–2	VCU Rams	Richmond, Virginia
19:00 EDT				Stadium: Ukrop Park; Attendance: 500

March 11, 2012 Preseason 3	Richmond Kickers	7–0	Richmond Kickers U-18	Richmond, Virginia
18:00 EDT				Stadium: Ukrop Park

March 17, 2012 Preseason 4	Richmond Kickers	1–1	North Carolina Tar Heels	Richmond, Virginia
19:00 EDT	Delicâte 47'	Report	Walters 34'	Stadium: Ukrop Park; Attendance: 500; Referee: Mike Andrews
Note: 2012 Pro-Am Challenge

March 23, 2012 Preseason 5	Richmond Kickers	0–0	William & Mary Tribe	Richmond, Virginia
17:00 EDT		Report		Stadium: Ukrop Park; Attendance: 500

March 25, 2012 Preseason 6	Richmond Kickers	4–0	Old Dominion Monarchs	Richmond, Virginia
17:00 EDT	Delicâte 6'; Nyazamba 23'; Foglesong 54'; MacKenzie 58'	Report		Stadium: Ukrop Park; Attendance: 450

March 28, 2012 Preseason 7	Richmond Kickers	1–0	Longwood Lancers	Richmond, Virginia
19:00pm EDT	Nyazamba 36'			Stadium: Ukrop Park
Note: Match abandoned in the 65th minute due to severe weather

March 31, 2012 Preseason 8	Richmond Kickers	0–2	Maryland Terrapins	Richmond, Virginia
14:00 EDT		Report	Mullins 67', 76'	Stadium: City Stadium

=== USL Pro regular season ===
==== Standings ====
Pos	Team	Pld	W	T	L	GF	GA	GD	Pts	Qualification
1	Orlando City SC (C)	24	17	6	1	50	18	+32	57	Commissioner's Cup, Playoffs 1st round bye
2	Rochester Rhinos (A)	24	12	5	7	27	23	+4	41	Playoffs 1st round bye
3	Charleston Battery (A)	24	12	2	10	36	26	+10	38	Playoffs
4	Richmond Kickers (A)	24	11	5	8	31	27	+4	38	Playoffs
5	Wilmington Hammerheads (A)	24	10	7	7	34	32	+2	37	Playoffs
6	Harrisburg City Islanders (A)	24	10	7	7	34	29	+5	37	Playoffs
7	Charlotte Eagles	24	11	3	10	34	26	+8	36	
8	Los Angeles Blues	24	9	3	12	26	29	−3	30	
9	Dayton Dutch Lions	24	4	10	10	20	29	−9	22	
10	Pittsburgh Riverhounds	24	4	5	15	20	39	−19	17	
11	Antigua Barracuda	24	5	1	18	16	50	−34	16	

Source: USL Pro official standings
Rules for classification: Points, then tiebreak: 1) Head-to-head record based on total points in League games, 2) Total wins in League games, 3) Goal difference in League games, 4) Goals scored in League games, etc.
(A) Advances to USL Pro Playoffs; (C) Commissioner's Cup (best regular season record)

==== Match reports ====
April 7, 2012 Match 1	Richmond Kickers	1–2	Charleston Battery	Richmond, Virginia
17:00 EDT	Nyazamba 65'; Görres (yellow card) 70'	Report	Cuevas 41', 67'; Richter (yellow card) 80'	Stadium: City Stadium; Attendance: 5,009; Referee: Moo Hackett

April 14, 2012 Match 2	Charleston Battery	1–2	Richmond Kickers	Charleston, South Carolina
19:30 EDT	Paterson 19'; Falvey (yellow card) 61'	Report	Nyazamba 61' (yellow card) 79'; Callahan (yellow card) 81'; Görres 90'	Stadium: Blackbaud Stadium; Attendance: 4,729 (SO); Referee: Sky Arthur Benning

April 21, 2012 Match 3	Richmond Kickers	0–2	Orlando City	Richmond, Virginia
17:00 EDT	Callahan (yellow card) 69'	Report	Molino (yellow card) 31'; Boden 61'; Pulis 89' (pen.)	Stadium: City Stadium; Attendance: 3,169; Referee: Mark Gorak

April 28, 2012 Match 4	Orlando City	0–0	Richmond Kickers	Orlando, Florida
19:30 EDT	Ustruck (yellow card) 75'	Report	Kalungi (yellow card) 49'; Bulow (yellow card) 83'	Stadium: Citrus Bowl; Attendance: 7,899; Referee: Marcos C. Deoliveira

May 5, 2012 Match 5	Dayton Dutch Lions	1–1	Richmond Kickers	Bellbrook, Ohio
19:30 EDT	Bardsley 2'; Preciado (yellow card) 29'; Bartels (yellow card) 61'; Holloway (yellow card) 75'; DeGroot (yellow card) 90'	Report	Hiroyama (yellow card) 54'; Bulow 90' (pen.)	Stadium: Miami Valley South Stadium; Attendance: 1,012; Referee: Andrey Castel

May 12, 2012 Match 6	Richmond Kickers	2–2	Harrisburg City Islanders	Richmond, Virginia
19:00 EDT	Delicâte 8'; Agorsor (yellow card) 11' (goal) 78'	Report	Noone 9'; Pelletier (yellow card) 44'; Langley (yellow card) 58'; Ekra 80'; Welker (yellow card) 89'	Stadium: City Stadium; Attendance: 2,273; Referee: Andrew Chapin

May 19, 2012 Match 7	Pittsburgh Riverhounds	1–1	Richmond Kickers	Bridgeville, Pennsylvania
19:00 EDT	Smith 45'; Harada (yellow card) 69'	Report	Pascale (yellow card) 31'; Delicâte 71'; Foglesong (yellow card) 77'	Stadium: Chartiers Valley High School; Attendance: 897; Referee: John Douglass

May 26, 2012 Match 8	Richmond Kickers	3–1	Wilmington Hammerheads	Richmond, Virginia
19:00 EDT	Bulow 69'; Agorsor 90'; Agorsor 90'	Report	Budnyy 18'	Stadium: City Stadium; Attendance: 2,346; Referee: Matt Franz

June 1, 2012 Match 9	Harrisburg City Islanders	1–1	Richmond Kickers	Harrisburg, Pennsylvania
19:00 EDT	Brandt (yellow card) 67'; Pettis 79'; Basso (yellow card) 84'	Report	Johnson 68' (yellow card) 70'	Stadium: Skyline Sports Complex; Referee: Michael Piercey

June 2, 2012 Match 10	Rochester Rhinos	0–1	Richmond Kickers	Rochester, New York
19:05 EDT	Kirk (yellow card) 13'; Cost (yellow card) 61'; Fernandez (yellow card) 90'	Report	Vercollone 5'	Stadium: Sahlen's Stadium; Attendance: 5,237; Referee: David Mon

June 9, 2012 Match 11	Richmond Kickers	1–0	Charlotte Eagles	Richmond, Virginia
19:00 EDT	Bulow 90'	Report	Grousis (yellow card) 90'	Stadium: City Stadium; Attendance: 2,193; Referee: Mark Gorak

June 15, 2012 Match 12	Wilmington Hammerheads	2–1	Richmond Kickers	Wilmington, North Carolina
19:30 EDT	Budnyy 16'; Evans (yellow card) 23'; Hertzog 29'; Cole (yellow card) 38'; Nicholson (yellow card) 65'	Report	Agorsor 6'	Stadium: Legion Field; Attendance: 3,371; Referee: David McPhun

June 16, 2012 Match 13	Charlotte Eagles	4–1	Richmond Kickers	Charlotte, North Carolina
20:00 EDT	Thornton 24'; Kabwe 65'; Ferrer 86'; Meza 90+'	Report	Agorsor 19'; Vercollone (yellow card) 81'	Stadium: Charlotte Christian Stadium; Attendance: 1,447; Referee: Jordan Shaw

June 23, 2012 Match 14	Richmond Kickers	2–3	Rochester Rhinos	Richmond, Virginia
19:00 EDT	Vercollone 8'; Callahan (yellow card) 45'; Yeisley 81'; Pascale (yellow card) 90'	Report	Brito 27'; Earls (yellow card) 42'; Tanke (yellow card) 59'; Hoxie 85'; Banks 90'; Nicht (yellow card) 90'	Stadium: City Stadium; Attendance: 2,365; Referee: Shawn Fitch

July 3, 2012 Match 15	Richmond Kickers	1–0	Los Angeles Blues	Richmond, Virginia
19:00 EDT	Heins 66'	Report	Russell (yellow card) 60'; Miller (yellow card) 79'	Stadium: City Stadium; Attendance: 1,424; Referee: Charles Carson

July 7, 2012 Match 16	Wilmington Hammerheads	1–0	Richmond Kickers	Wilmington, North Carolina
19:30 EDT	Parratt (yellow card) 20'; Hertzog 66'; Musa (yellow card) 73'	Report	Heins (yellow card) 23'; Kalungi (yellow card) 45' (yellow-red card) 86'; Delicâte (yellow card) 73'	Stadium: Legion Field; Attendance: 3,909; Referee: (United States) Abbes Mansour-Hafifi

July 13, 2012 Match 17	Richmond Kickers	3–1	Pittsburgh Riverhounds	Richmond, Virginia
19:00 EDT	William 37'; Calvano 45' (o.g.); Delicâte (yellow card) 73' (goal) 86' (pen.)	Report	Kassel (yellow card) 56' (goal) 90' (pen.); Smith (yellow card) 69'; Costanzo (yellow card) 90+2'	Stadium: City Stadium; Attendance: 1,641

July 21, 2012 Match 18	Richmond Kickers	2–0	Dayton Dutch Lions	Richmond, Virginia
19:00 EDT	Heins 11'; Davies (yellow card) 33'; Delicâte 90' (pen.)	Report	Williams (yellow card) 48'; DeLass (yellow card) 85'; Bardsley (red card) 90'; Jeff DeGroot (yellow card) 90'	Stadium: City Stadium; Attendance: 1,510; Referee: Jim Sadowski

July 27, 2012 Match 19	Charlotte Eagles	1–0	Richmond Kickers	Charlotte, North Carolina
19:00 EDT	Devon Grousis (yellow card) 23'; Roberts (yellow card) 52' (goal) 80'	Report		Stadium: Charlotte Christian Stadium; Attendance: 581; Referee: Matt Jozaitis

July 28, 2012 Match 20	Richmond Kickers	2–1	Charlotte Eagles	Richmond, Virginia
19:00 EDT	William 13', 56'; Vercollone (yellow card) 42'	Report	Herrera 73' (yellow card) 75'	Stadium: City Stadium; Referee: Matthew Franz

August 3, 2012 Match 21	Richmond Kickers	2–0	Antigua Barracuda	Richmond, Virginia
19:00 EDT	dos Santos 84'; Delicâte 90'	Report	Blakely (yellow card) 32'	Stadium: City Stadium; Attendance: 1,907; Referee: Jeff Davis

August 11, 2012 Match 22	Richmond Kickers	2–1	Harrisburg City Islanders	Richmond, Virginia
19:00 EDT	Nyazamba 13'; Agorsor (yellow card) 44'; Kalungi (yellow card) 56'; Yomby William 78'	Report	Yomby William 15' (o.g.); Welker (yellow card) 86'	Stadium: City Stadium; Attendance: 2,922; Referee: Bill Dittmar

August 17, 2012 Match 23	Antigua Barracuda	0–1	Richmond Kickers	Saint George Parish, Antigua and Barbuda
19:00 EDT	Blakely (yellow card) 47'; Christian (yellow card) 71'	Report	Bulow 61'	Stadium: Sir Vivian Richards Stadium; Attendance: 400; Referee: Curtis Charles

August 19, 2012 Match 24	Antigua Barracuda	2–1	Richmond Kickers	Saint George Parish, Antigua and Barbuda
19:00 EDT	Griffith 1'; Burton 38'	Report	Agorsor 90+2'	Stadium: Sir Vivian Richards Stadium; Attendance: 381; Referee: Brian Willet

=== USL Pro Playoffs ===
August 25, 2012 First round	Richmond Kickers	2–3	Wilmington Hammerheads	Richmond, Virginia
19:00 EDT	Yeisley 12'; Elcock 79'	Report; Report	Briggs (yellow card) 57'; Chirishian 69'; Perry 72'; Guzman (yellow card) 90'; Parratt 90+3'	Stadium: City Stadium; Attendance: 1,441; Referee: Charles Carson

=== U.S. Open Cup ===
May 22, 2012 Second round	Aegean Hawks (Virginia)	0–4	(Virginia) Richmond Kickers	Boyds, Maryland
19:30 EDT			Agorsor 20' dos Santos 30', 82'; Hiroyama 84'	Stadium: Maryland SoccerPlex

May 29, 2012 Third round	Richmond Kickers (Virginia)	1–2 (a.e.t.)	(Washington, D.C.) D.C. United	Richmond, Virginia
19:00 EDT	Nyazamba 45' (pen.)	Report	Salihi 24'; Saragosa 107'; Kitchen (yellow card) 111'	Stadium: City Stadium; Attendance: 5,014; Referee: Kai Goodrich

== Statistics ==
=== Appearances and goals ===
No.	Pos	Nat	Player	Total		Regular Season		Playoffs		U.S. Open Cup	
No.	Pos	Nat	Player	Apps	Goals	Apps	Goals	Apps	Goals	Apps	Goals
0	GK	(United States) USA	Josh Pantazelos	0	0	0	0	0	0	0	0
1	GK	(England) ENG	Ryan Jones	0	0	0	0	0	0	0	0
2	DF	(Cameroon) CMR	Yomby William	20	4	18	4	1	0	1	0
3	DF	(United States) USA	Shane Johnson	22	1	19	1	1	0	2	0
4	DF	(United States) USA	Luke Vercollone	27	2	24	2	1	0	2	0
5	MF	(United States) USA	Ryan Heins	26	2	23	2	1	0	2	0
7	FW	(England) ENG	Matthew Delicâte	21	5	19	5	1	0	1	0
8	MF	(Brazil) BRA	Gerson dos Santos	26	2	23	1	1	0	2	1
9	MF	(Japan) JPN	Nozomi Hiroyama	22	1	19	0	1	0	2	1
10	MF	(United States) USA	David Bulow	20	4	19	4	0	0	1	0
11	MF	(United States) USA	Edson Elcock	20	1	18	0	1	1	1	0
14	MF	(United States) USA	Bobby Foglesong	13	0	12	0	0	0	1	0
15	MF	(United States) USA	Chris Agorsor	24	8	21	6	1	0	2	2
16	FW	(Scotland) SCO	Ross MacKenzie	4	0	4	0	0	0	0	0
17	FW	(United States) USA	Jason Yeisley	22	2	19	1	1	1	2	0
18	FW	(China) CHN	Long Tan	1	0	1	0	0	0	0	0
19	MF	(United States) USA	Michael Burke	8	0	7	0	1	0	0	0
20	MF	(Canada) CAN	Philippe Davies	6	0	6	0	0	0	0	0
21	MF	(United States) USA	Michael Callahan	17	0	16	0	0	0	1	0
22	GK	(United States) USA	Ronnie Pascale	27	0	24	0	1	0	2	0
23	DF	(Germany) GER	Sascha Görres	27	1	24	1	1	0	2	0
24	DF	(United States) USA	Ethan White	6	0	6	0	0	0	0	0
25	DF	(Uganda) UGA	Henry Kalungi	19	0	17	0	1	0	1	0
99	MF	(Zimbabwe) ZIM	Stanley Nyazamba	21	4	19	3	1	0	1	1

=== Top scorers ===
Ranking	Position	Nation	Number	Name	USL Pro	U.S. Open Cup	Playoffs	Total
1	FW	(United States)	15	Christopher Agorsor	6	2	0	8
2	FW	(England)	7	Matthew Delicâte	5	0	0	5
3	DF	(Cameroon)	2	Yomby William	4	0	0	4
3	MF	(United States)	10	David Bulow	4	0	0	4
3	MF	(Zimbabwe)	99	Stanley Nyazamba	3	1	0	4
4	DF	(United States)	4	Luke Vercollone	2	0	0	2
4	MF	(United States)	5	Ryan Heins	2	0	0	2
4	MF	(Brazil)	8	Gerson dos Santos	1	1	0	2
4	FW	(United States)	17	Jason Yeisley	1	0	1	2
5	DF	(United States)	3	Shane Johnson	1	0	0	1
5	MF	(Japan)	9	Nozomi Hiroyama	0	1	0	1
5	MF	(United States)	11	Edson Elcock	0	0	1	1
5	DF	(Germany)	23	Sascha Görres	1	0	0	1

=== Disciplinary record ===
Position	Nation	Number	Name	USL Pro		USL Pro Playoffs		Open Cup		Total (USSF Total)	
Position	Nation	Number	Name	Yellow card	Red card	Yellow card	Red card	Yellow card	Red card	Yellow card	Red card
TOTALS				—	—	—	—	—	—	—	—

== Transfers ==
=== In ===
No.	Pos.	Player	Transferred from	Fee/notes	Date	Source
17	FW	(United States) Jason Yeisley	(United States) Pittsburgh Riverhounds	Free	December 6, 2011	
3	DF	(United States) Shane Johnson	(United States) Longwood Lancers	Free	March 9, 2012	
15	FW	(United States) Chris Agorsor	(United States) Real Salt Lake	Free	April 26, 2012	
20	MF	(Canada) Philippe Davies	(Canada) Vancouver Whitecaps	Free	July 13, 2012	

=== Out ===
No.	Pos.	Player	Transferred to	Fee/notes	Date	Source
12	MF	(Sierra Leone) Shaka Bangura	Anagennisi Dherynia	Free	January 12, 2012	
12	MF	(United States) Jamel Wallace	Wilmington Hammerheads	Free	February 15, 2013	
15	MF	(Canada) Evan Harding	Unattached			
17	MF	(United States) Dave Hertel	Unattached			

=== Loan in ===
No.	Pos.	Player	Loaned from	Start	End	Source
24	DF	(United States) Ethan White	(United States) D.C. United	Loan	June 14, 2012	
18	FW	(China) Long Tan	(United States) D.C. United	Loan	July 13, 2012	

=== Loan out ===
No.	Pos.	Player	Loaned to	Start	End	Source
25	DF	(Uganda) Henry Kalungi	(Uganda) Proline	October 3, 2011	February 3, 2012	

== See also ==
- 2012 in American soccer
- 2012 USL Pro season
- Richmond Kickers
