= 2010 Richmond Kickers season =

Richmond Kickers
2010 season
- Owner: Richmond Kickers Youth Soccer Club
- Head coach: Leigh Cowlishaw
- USL Second Division: Second
- U.S. Open Cup: Third Round
- USL Second Division Playoffs: Runners-up

The 2010 Richmond Kickers season was their eighteenth season overall and their last season in the USL Second Division.

== Review ==
The 2010 Richmond Kickers season was their eighteenth season overall and their last season in the USL Second Division. The Kickers finished in second place in the USL Second Division regular season standings. In the playoffs, the Kickers beat the Pittsburgh Riverhounds to advance to the championship game, which they lost to the Charleston Battery.

In the U.S. Open Cup, the Richmond Kickers beat Crystal Palace Baltimore and the Real Maryland Monarchs to advance to the third round. In the third round, they lost to D.C. United 2–1.

== Roster ==
=== First team ===
As of February 18, 2013.

Note: Flags indicate national team as defined under FIFA eligibility rules; some limited exceptions apply. Players may hold more than one non-FIFA nationality.

No.	Pos.	Nation	Player
1	GK	USA	Mark Murphy
1	GK	USA	Karry Harrison
2	DF	CMR	Yomby William
3	DF	USA	Roger Bothe
4	DF	USA	Luke Vercollone
5	MF	USA	Stephen Nsereko
7	FW	ENG	Matthew Delicâte
8	MF	BRA	Gerson dos Santos
9	MF	USA	Charlie Reiter
10	MF	USA	Chris Carrieri
11	MF	USA	Edson Elcock
12	MF	USA	Neil Barlow

No.	Pos.	Nation	Player
14	MF	USA	Bobby Foglesong
15	MF	USA	Evan Harding
16	MF	SCO	Ross MacKenzie
16	MF	USA	Jordan Evans
17	MF	USA	Dave Hertel
19	MF	USA	Michael Burke
20	FW	USA	Jeremy Barlow
21	MF	USA	Jonathan Villanueva
22	GK	USA	Ronnie Pascale
23	DF	GER	Sascha Görres
24	MF	RSA	Ty Shipalane
25	DF	UGA	Henry Kalungi
27	MF	ZIM	Joseph Kabwe

== Overall standings ==
USL Second Division
Pos	Team	Pld	W	L	T	GF	GA	GD	Pts	Qualification
1	Charleston Battery	20	11	4	5	35	25	+10	38	Regular season champion
2	Richmond Kickers	20	9	5	6	25	20	+5	33	Playoff spot clinched
3	Pittsburgh Riverhounds	20	7	5	8	27	20	+7	29	Playoff spot clinched
4	Charlotte Eagles	20	5	8	7	23	30	−7	22	
5	Harrisburg City Islanders	20	4	9	7	21	30	−9	19	
6	Real Maryland Monarchs	20	3	8	9	16	22	−6	18	

Source: official USL-2 standings table

== Match results ==
=== USL Second Division ===
Home team is listed on the left.

==== Regular season ====
April 17, 2010 1	Richmond Kickers	2–2	Harrisburg City Islanders	Richmond, VA
19:00 EDT	Delicâte 11'; Kalungi (yellow card) 14'; Burke (yellow card) 73'; Delicâte 76'	Report	Williams 17'; Ombiji 40'	Stadium: City Stadium; Attendance: 2,417; Referee: Kai Goodrich

April 24, 2010 2	Richmond Kickers	0–1	Charlotte Eagles	Richmond, VA
19:00 EDT		Report	Bentos 29'; Dalby (yellow card) 74'; Debola Ogunseye (yellow card) 77'	Stadium: City Stadium; Attendance: 1,279; Referee: Mark Gorak

May 1, 2010 3	Real Maryland Monarchs	0–1	Richmond Kickers	Rockville, Maryland
18:30 EDT	Hamed Diallo (yellow card) 45'; Nate Baker (yellow card) 48'	Report	Delicâte 78'	Stadium: Richard Montgomery High School; Attendance: 907; Referee: Dean Fairweather

May 2, 2010 4	Pittsburgh Riverhounds	1–1	Richmond Kickers	Bridgeville, Pennsylvania
15:00 EDT	Luke Vercollone 13' (o.g.); Kolby LaCrone (yellow card) 64'; Matt Baker (yellow card) 90'	Report	Neil Barlow (yellow card) 21'; Edson Elcock (yellow card) 36'; Michael Burke (yellow card) 61'; Delicâte 90'	Stadium: Chartiers Valley High School; Attendance: 658; Referee: John Safar

May 8, 2010 5	Richmond Kickers	1–1	Real Maryland Monarchs	Richmond, VA
19:00 EDT	Delicâte 17'	Report	63' (o.g.)	Stadium: City Stadium; Attendance: 1,986; Referee: Shawn Fitch

May 16, 2010 6	Real Maryland Monarchs	0–2	Richmond Kickers	Rockville, Maryland
18:30 EDT	Gareth Evans (yellow card) 55'	Report	Luke Vercollone 43'; Edson Elcock 50'; Michael Burke (yellow card) 58'	Stadium: Richard Montgomery High School; Referee: Dean Fairweather

May 21, 2010 7	Richmond Kickers	3–1	Charlotte Eagles	Richmond, VA
19:00 EDT	Jonathan Villanueva 2'; Matthew Delicâte 21'; Henry Kalungi (yellow card) 44'; Michael Burke 52'	Report	Jorge Herrera (yellow card) 49'; Brady Bryant (yellow card) 50'; Jorge Herrera 54'	Stadium: City Stadium; Attendance: 1810; Referee: Shaun Papperman

May 29, 2010 8	Richmond Kickers	1–3	Pittsburgh Riverhounds	Richmond, VA
19:00 EDT	Bobby Foglesong (yellow card) 35'; Luke Vercollone (yellow card) 69'; Matthew Delicâte 78'	Report	Shintaro Harada (yellow card) 30'; Chad Severs 36' (pen.); Lee Kouadio-Tobey 77'; Tommy Gray 85'	Stadium: City Stadium; Attendance: 2561; Referee: Jeff Davis

June 5, 2010 9	Richmond Kickers	3–1	Charleston Battery	Richmond, VA
19:00 EDT	Sascha Görres (yellow card) 40'; Edson Elcock 58' dos Santos (yellow card) 68'; Bobby Foglesong 70'; Bobby Foglesong (yellow card) 71'; Sascha Görres 78'; Matthew Delicate (yellow card) 89'	Report	O'Brian Woodbine (yellow card) 75'; Alioune Gueye 81'; Nigel Marples (yellow card) 84'	Stadium: City Stadium; Attendance: 2037; Referee: Corey Parker

June 11, 2010 10	Charleston Battery	4–1	Richmond Kickers	Charleston, South Carolina
19:30 EDT	Lamar Neagle 10' 12'; Tom Heinemann 74'; Amaury Nunes (yellow card) 86' (goal) 90'; Levi Coleman (yellow card) 89'	Report	dos Santos (yellow card) 44'; Sascha Görres (yellow card) 40'; Matthew Delicate 66'	Stadium: Blackbaud Stadium; Attendance: 3937; Referee: Agostino Minasola

June 19, 2010 11	Harrisburg City Islanders	0–1	Richmond Kickers	Harrisburg, Pennsylvania
19:30 EDT	Ryan Zabinski (yellow card) 86'	Report	Matthew Delicate 23'	Stadium: Skyline Sports Complex; Attendance: 1713; Referee: Stan Nagle

June 26, 2010 12	Charlotte Eagles	1–1	Richmond Kickers	Charlotte, North Carolina
20:00 EDT	Jorge Herrera (yellow card) 61'; Miguel Ferrer 68'	Report	Matthew Delicate 59'	Stadium: Charlotte Christian Stadium; Attendance: 903; Referee: Saeed Mohammed

July 3, 2010 13	Richmond Kickers	2–0	Charleston Battery	Richmond, Virginia
13:00 EDT	Edson Elcock 21'; Stephen Nsereko (yellow card) 51' dos Santos 90'	Report	Nigel Marples (yellow card) 18'	Stadium: City Stadium; Attendance: 1761; Referee: Kai Goodrich

July 9, 2010 14	Charleston Battery	1–0	Richmond Kickers	Charleston, South Carolina
19:30 EDT	Bobby Foglesong (yellow card) 43'; Matthew Delicate (red card) 90'	Report	Stephen Armstrong (yellow card) 43'; O'Brian Woodbine 48' (yellow card) 41' (yellow-red card) 82'; John Wilson (red card) 90'	Stadium: Blackbaud Stadium; Attendance: 3403; Referee: Abbas Piran

July 10, 2010 15	Charlotte Eagles	1–1	Richmond Kickers	Charlotte, North Carolina
19:00 EDT	Greg Dalby 74'; Ramak Safi (yellow card) 90'	Report	Edson Elcock 31'; Sascha Görres (yellow card) 88'	Stadium: Charlotte Christian Stadium; Attendance: 834; Referee: Justus Agbeke

July 15, 2010 16	Pittsburgh Riverhounds	2–0	Richmond Kickers	Bridgeville, Pennsylvania
19:00 EDT	Chad Severs 57', 68'	Report	Matthew Delicâte (yellow card) 56'	Stadium: Chartiers Valley High School; Attendance: 905; Referee: Islam Sallas

July 24, 2010 17	Richmond Kickers	1–0	Pittsburgh Riverhounds	Richmond, Virginia
19:00 EDT	Bobby Foglesong 8'	Report	Lee Kouadio-Tobey (yellow card) 18'; Travis MacKenzie (yellow card) 53'	Stadium: City Stadium; Attendance: 1712; Referee: Bryan Roslund

July 31, 2010 18	Richmond Kickers	2–0	Harrisburg City Islanders	Richmond, Virginia
19:00 EDT	Edson Elcock 11' dos Santos 50'	Report	Anthony Calvano (yellow card) 89'	Stadium: City Stadium; Attendance: 1833; Referee: Jim Sadowski

August 7, 2010 19	Harrisburg City Islanders	0–1	Richmond Kickers	Harrisburg, Pennsylvania
19:00 EDT	Dustin Bixler (yellow card) 42'; Anthony Calvano (yellow card) 52'; Sheanon Williams (yellow card) 90'	Report	Matthew Delicate 1'; Yomby William (yellow card) 69'; Stephen Nsereko (yellow card) 90'	Stadium: Skyline Sports Complex; Attendance: 1417; Referee: Zach Rubinich

August 14, 2010 20	Richmond Kickers	1–1	Real Maryland Monarchs	Richmond, Virginia
19:00 EDT	Jonathan Villanueva 71'; William Yomby (yellow card) 74'	Report	Alan Sanchez (yellow card) 46'; Ben Hunter (yellow card) 67'; Israel Sesay (yellow card) 68'; Brian Visser (yellow card) 78'; Gareth Evans (yellow card) 86'	Stadium: City Stadium; Attendance: 3044; Referee: Shaun Papperman

==== Playoffs ====
August 21, 2010 1	Richmond Kickers	2–0	Pittsburgh Riverhounds	Richmond, Virginia
19:00 EDT	Matthew Delicate 35'; Bobby Foglesong 50'; Joseph Kabwe (yellow card) 65'; Michael Burke (yellow card) 90'	Report	Lee Kouadio-Tobey (yellow card) 90'	Stadium: City Stadium; Attendance: 2276; Referee: Mark Gorak

August 28, 2010 2	Charleston Battery	2–1	Richmond Kickers	Charleston, South Carolina
18:00 EDT	Edson Elcock 73'; Michael Burke (yellow card) 83'; William Yomby (yellow card) 83'	Report	Lamar Neagle 26' (yellow card) 83'; Colin Falvey (red card) 30'; Ian Fuller 52'; O'Brian Woodbine (yellow card) 79'	Stadium: Blackbaud Stadium; Attendance: 4523; Referee: Jose Carlos Rivero

=== U.S. Open Cup ===
June 15, 2010 1	Richmond Kickers	1–0 (a.e.t.)	Crystal Palace Baltimore	Richmond, Virginia
19:00 EDT	Michael Burke (yellow card) 41'; Bobby Foglesong (yellow card) 69'; Matthew Delicate 119'	Report	Gary Brooks (yellow card) 70'; Tsuyoshi Yoshitake (yellow card) 100'; Adauto Neto (yellow card) 104'	Stadium: City Stadium; Attendance: 1123; Referee: Mike Andrews

June 22, 2010 2	Richmond Kickers	3–1	Real Maryland Monarchs	Richmond, Virginia
19:00 EDT	William Yomby 10'; Luke Vercollone (yellow card) 60'; Matthew Delicate 69'; Bobby Foglesong 78'	Report	Kenneth Sola (yellow card) 57'; Ben Hunter (yellow card) 72'; Alan Sanchez 83'	Stadium: City Stadium; Attendance: 1360; Referee: Mark Gorak

June 30, 2010 3	D.C. United	2–0	Richmond Kickers	Fairfax, Virginia
19:30vEDT	Jaime Moreno 47'; Santino Quaranta 56'; Danny Allsopp (yellow card) 72'	(Report)	Henry Kalungi (yellow card) 31'	Stadium: George Mason Stadium; Attendance: 2,985

== See also ==
- Richmond Kickers
- 2010 in American soccer
- 2010 U.S. Open Cup
