= 2013 Richmond Kickers season =

Richmond Kickers
2013 season
- Owner: Richmond Kickers Youth Soccer Club
- Head coach: Leigh Cowlishaw
- Stadium: City Stadium
- USL Pro: 1st
- USL Pro Playoffs: Semifinals
- U.S. Open Cup: Third Round
- Highest home attendance: 4,921 vs. Orlando City SC (August 14; USL Pro Regular Season)
- Lowest home attendance: 787 vs. Icon FC (May 21; U.S. Open Cup)
- Average home league attendance: League: 2,637; Playoffs: 3,402; Cup: 2,770
| Home colors | Away colors | Third colors |

The 2013 Richmond Kickers season was the soccer club's twenty-first season of existence. It was the Kickers' seventh-consecutive year in the third-tier of American soccer, playing in the USL Professional Division for their third season. The Kickers finished the season atop the USL Pro table, but lost in the playoff semifinals.

== Competitions ==
=== Preseason ===
| February 22, 2013 | Richmond Kickers | 3–0 | George Mason Patriots | Richmond, Virginia |
| 19:00 EDT | Bulow 58'; Sekyere 60'; Oldham 88' | Report | | Stadium: Ukrop Park |

| March 2, 2013 | Richmond Kickers | 1–4 | Carolina RailHawks | Richmond, Virginia |
| 19:00 EDT | Thomas 72' | Report | Ackley 30'; Shriver 33', 76', 81' | Stadium: Ukrop Park; Attendance: 500 |

| March 12, 2013 | Richmond Kickers | 1–1 | William & Mary Tribe | Richmond, Virginia |
| 19:00 EDT | | | | Stadium: Ukrop Park |

| March 16, 2013 | Richmond Kickers | 0–1 | Georgetown Hoyas | Richmond, Virginia |
| 19:00 EDT | | | Neumann | Stadium: Ukrop Park |

| March 19, 2013 | Richmond Kickers | 6–1 | Longwood Lancers | Richmond, Virginia |
| 19:00 EDT | Townsend x 3 Nyazamba x 2 Johnson | | Goal | Stadium: Ukrop Park |

| March 23, 2013 | Richmond Kickers | 3–2 | VCU Rams | Richmond, Virginia |
| 19:00 EDT | | | | Stadium: City Stadium |

| March 26, 2013 | Richmond Kickers | 3–0 | James Madison Dukes | Richmond, Virginia |
| 19:30 EDT | | | | Stadium: City Stadium |

=== USL Pro ===
==== Overall standings ====
| Pos | Team | Pld | W | T | L | GF | GA | GD | Pts | Qualification |
|---|---|---|---|---|---|---|---|---|---|---|
| 1 | Richmond Kickers (C) | 26 | 15 | 10 | 1 | 51 | 24 | +27 | 55 | Commissioner's Cup, Playoffs |
| 2 | Orlando City (A) | 26 | 16 | 6 | 4 | 54 | 26 | +28 | 54 | Playoffs |
| 3 | Charleston Battery (A) | 26 | 13 | 6 | 7 | 48 | 29 | +19 | 45 | Playoffs |
| 4 | Harrisburg City Islanders (A) | 26 | 14 | 2 | 10 | 55 | 39 | +16 | 44 | Playoffs |
| 5 | Charlotte Eagles (A) | 26 | 10 | 11 | 5 | 44 | 39 | +5 | 41 | Playoffs |

Source: USL Pro official standings
Rules for classification: 1) points; 2) goal difference; 3) number of goals scored.
(A) Advances to USL Pro Playoffs; (C) Commissioner's Cup (best regular season record)

==== Match results ====
| April 6, 2013 1 | Richmond Kickers | 0–0 | Pittsburgh Riverhounds | Richmond, Virginia |
| 19:00 EDT | Kalungi (yellow card) 31' | Report | | Stadium: City Stadium; Attendance: 3,268; Referee: Robert Sibiga |

| April 13, 2013 2 | Richmond Kickers | 4–1 | Charleston Battery | Richmond, Virginia |
| 19:00 EDT | Ngwenya 23'; Townsend 32', 68' own goal 87' (o.g.) | Report | Wilson 45' | Stadium: City Stadium; Attendance: 2,497; Referee: Mark Gorak |

| April 20, 2013 3 | Richmond Kickers | 4–1 | Rochester Rhinos | Richmond, Virginia |
| 19:00 EDT | Callahan 45+'; Ngwenya 51' (pen.); Yeisley 66'; Nyazamba 84' | | Luzunaris 3'; Earls (yellow card) 28'; Kyrikasis (red card) 50'; Brettschneider (yellow card) 55'; Rosenlund (red card) 76'; Fernández (yellow card) 87' | Stadium: City Stadium; Attendance: 2,270; Referee: Mark Kocilek |

| May 3, 2013 4 | Wilmington Hammerheads | 0–2 | Richmond Kickers | Wilmington, North Carolina |
| 19:00 EDT | Parratt (yellow card) 40'; Davidson (yellow card) 57' | Report | Vercollone 73'; Seaton 90' | Stadium: Legion Field; Attendance: 2,742; Referee: Chris Spivey |

| May 4, 2013 5 | Richmond Kickers | 3–3 | Charlotte Eagles | Richmond, Virginia |
| 19:00 EDT | Ownby 14'; Nyazamba 34'; Shanosky 90+2' | Report | Yates 48'; Asante (yellow card) 59'; Thornton (yellow card) 62'; Smith 79'; Francis 90+1' | Stadium: City Stadium; Attendance: 2,031; Referee: Matthew Franz |

| May 11, 2013 6 | Richmond Kickers | 4–1 | Antigua Barracuda FC | Richmond, Virginia |
| 19:00 EDT | Ngwenya 18', 22', 44'; Vercollone 48' | Report | Thomas 35' | Stadium: City Stadium; Attendance: 1,996; Referee: J.T. Alukonis |

| May 17, 2013 7 | Richmond Kickers | 1–1 | Los Angeles Blues | Richmond, Virginia |
| 19:00 EDT | Ngwenya 37' | Report | Perez 88' | Stadium: City Stadium; Attendance: 1,836; Referee: Charles Carson |

| May 24, 2013 8 | Richmond Kickers | 2–0 | Harrisburg City Islanders | Richmond, Virginia |
| 19:00 EDT | Robinson 60'; Seaton 66'; Callahan (yellow card) 85' | Report | Langley (yellow card) 76' | Stadium: City Stadium; Attendance: 1,813; Referee: Brandon Marion |

| May 31, 2013 9 | Richmond Kickers | 1–0 | Phoenix FC | Richmond, Virginia |
| 19:00 EDT | Robinson 30'; Arbelaez (yellow card) 58'; Seaton (yellow card) 83' | Report | Morrison (yellow card) 87' | Stadium: City Stadium; Attendance: 1,694; Referee: Ben Hichak |

| June 8, 2013 10 | Richmond Kickers | 1–1 | Wilmington Hammerheads | Richmond, Virginia |
| 19:00 EDT | Davies 78' | Report | Perry 79' | Stadium: City Stadium; Attendance: 2,467; Referee: Jeff Davis |

| June 14, 2013 11 | Richmond Kickers | 4–0 | Antigua Barracuda FC | Richmond, Virginia |
| 19:00 EDT | Robinson 24'; Ownby 56', 77'; Haboush 85' | Report | | Stadium: City Stadium; Attendance: 1,902; Referee: Charles Carson |

| June 22, 2013 12 | Richmond Kickers | 1–1 | Whitecaps FC 2 | Richmond, Virginia |
| 19:00 EDT | Ngwenya 54' | Report | Manneh 22' | Stadium: City Stadium; Attendance: 2,135; Referee: Matthew Franz |

| June 29, 2013 13 | Orlando City SC | 0–2 | Richmond Kickers | Orlando, Florida |
| 19:30 EDT | Burke (yellow card) 58' | Report | Seaton 57'; Ownby 77' (yellow card) 78' | Stadium: Citrus Bowl; Attendance: 8,842; Referee: Patrick O'Brian |

| June 30, 2013 14 | VSI Tampa Bay FC | 0–0 | Richmond Kickers | Plant City, Florida |
| 19:35 EDT | Donatelli (yellow card) 57'; Toby (yellow card) 71'; Chin (yellow card) 83' | Report | Davies (yellow card) 42'; Ownby (yellow card) 80' | Stadium: Plant City Stadium; Attendance: 249; Referee: Don Dellavia |

| July 6, 2013 15 | Dayton Dutch Lions | 2–3 | Richmond Kickers | Beavercreek, Ohio |
| 19:30 EDT | Swartzendruber 4'; Garner (yellow card) 40'; Westdijk (yellow card) 80'; Preciado 87' | Report | Lee (yellow card) 47'; Vercollone 57', 59'; Seaton 71' | Stadium: Beavercreek High School; Attendance: 405; Referee: Mike Farmer |

| July 12, 2013 16 | Rochester Rhinos | 1–1 | Richmond Kickers | Rochester, New York |
| 19:35 EDT | Hoxie 90'; Kyriazis (yellow card) 90+1' | Report | Vercollone 65'; Nyazamba (yellow card) 75'; Ownby (yellow card) 90+3' | Stadium: Sahlen's Stadium; Attendance: 5,762; Referee: Steve Montanino |

| July 13, 2013 17 | Harrisburg City Islanders | 0–1 | Richmond Kickers | Harrisburg, Pennsylvania |
| 19:00 EDT | Basso (yellow card) 26'; Touray (yellow card) 90' | Report | Davies (yellow card) 75'; Seaton 77' | Stadium: Skyline Sports Complex; Attendance: 1,568; Referee: Darth Newman |

| July 19, 2013 18 | Phoenix FC | 2–2 | Richmond Kickers | Phoenix, Arizona |
| 22:30 EDT | Schafer 22'; Ramos 23', 45'; Vickers (yellow card) 66' | Report | Yomby 67'; Davies (yellow card) 75'; Johnson 90' | Stadium: Sun Devil Soccer Stadium; Attendance: 1,097; Referee: Jesus Cisneros |

| July 21, 2013 19 | Los Angeles Blues | 1–2 | Richmond Kickers | Fullerton, California |
| 16:00 EDT | Fondy 5' | | Ownby 76'; Bulow 86' (pen.) | Stadium: Cal State Fullerton Titan Stadium; Attendance: 756; Referee: Alejandro Mariscal |

| July 23, 2013 20 | Whitecaps FC 2 | 1–2 | Richmond Kickers | Vancouver, British Columbia |
| 19:00 EDT | Manneh 90+' | Report | Delicâte 15'; Shanosky 63' | Stadium: Thunderbird Stadium; Referee: Alain Ruch |

| July 28, 2013 21 | Richmond Kickers | 0–0 | VSI Tampa Bay FC | Richmond, Virginia |
| 17:00 EDT | | Report | | Stadium: City Stadium; Attendance: 2,537; Referee: Michael Samaan |

| August 2, 2013 22 | Charlotte Eagles | 0–1 | Richmond Kickers | Charlotte, North Carolina |
| 19:00 EDT | | Report | Ngwenya 72' | Stadium: Queens University Stadium; Attendance: 652; Referee: Skye Arthur-Banning |

| August 3, 2013 23 | Charleston Battery | 5–2 | Richmond Kickers | Charleston, South Carolina |
| 19:30 EDT | Falvey 23'; Azira 25', 84'; Kelly 48'; Cordoves 90+' | Report | Lee 45'; Delicâte 72' | Stadium: Blackbaud Stadium; Attendance: 3,460; Referee: Patrick Baker |

| August 10, 2013 24 | Richmond Kickers | 5–2 | Dayton Dutch Lions | Richmond, Virginia |
| 19:00 EDT | Delicâte 6', 39'; Ownby 37', 67'; Robinson 47' | Report | Garner 38'; Kalungi 64' (o.g.) | Stadium: City Stadium; Attendance: 4,014; Referee: Mark Gorak |

| August 14, 2013 25 | Richmond Kickers | 2–0 | Orlando City SC | Richmond, Virginia |
| 19:00 EDT | Delicâte 24', 29' | Report | | Stadium: City Stadium; Attendance: 4,921; Referee: Charles Carson |

| August 17, 2013 26 | Pittsburgh Riverhounds | 1–1 | Richmond Kickers | Pittsburgh, Pennsylvania |
| 19:00 EDT | Angulo 65' | Report | Ngwenya 68' | Stadium: Highmark Stadium; Attendance: 4,009; Referee: Ron Dambrosia |

=== USL Pro Playoffs ===
| August 24, 2013 Quarterfinals | Richmond Kickers | 1–0 | Dayton Dutch Lions | Richmond, Virginia |
| 19:00 EDT | Ownby (yellow card) 34'; Ngwenya 66' | Report | | Stadium: City Stadium; Attendance: 4,265; Referee: Charles Carson |

| August 30, 2013 Semifinals | Richmond Kickers | 1–2 | Charlotte Eagles | Richmond, Virginia |
| 19:00 EDT | Callahan 11' | Report | Ramirez 31'; Thornton 38' | Stadium: City Stadium; Attendance: 2,539; Referee: Jorge Gonzalez |

=== U.S. Open Cup ===
| May 21, 2013 Second round | Richmond Kickers (Virginia) | 4–1 | (New Jersey) Icon FC | Richmond, Virginia |
| 20:00 EDT | Nyazamba 11', 85'; Ngwenya 25' (pen.) own goal 62' (o.g.) | Report | Duka 9' | Stadium: City Stadium; Attendance: 787; Referee: Mark Gorak |

| May 28, 2013 Third round | Richmond Kickers (Virginia) | 0–0 (2–4 p) | (Washington, D.C.) D.C. United | Richmond, Virginia |
| 19:30 EDT | Yeisley (yellow card) 57'; Delicâte (yellow card) 73'; Dykstra (yellow card) 120' | Report | Pontius (yellow card) 82'; Korb (yellow card) 90' (yellow-red card) 113'; Ruiz (red card) 117' | Stadium: City Stadium; Attendance: 4,752 |
| | Penalties |
| | Görres (penalty missed); Ngwenya (penalty missed); Vercollone (penalty scored); Robinson (penalty scored) | | (penalty scored) De Rosario; (penalty scored) Kitchen; (penalty scored) DeLeon; (penalty scored) Riley |

== Statistics ==
=== Appearances and goals ===
| No. | Pos | Nat | Player | Total | | Regular Season | | U.S. Open Cup | | Playoffs | |
| No. | Pos | Nat | Player | Apps | Goals | Apps | Goals | Apps | Goals | Apps | Goals |
|---|---|---|---|---|---|---|---|---|---|---|---|
| 0 | GK | (United States) USA | Ryan Taylor | 1 | 0 | 1 | 0 | 0 | 0 | 0 | 0 |
| 1 | GK | (England) ENG | Ryan Jones | 4 | 0 | 4 | 0 | 0 | 0 | 0 | 0 |
| 2 | DF | (Cameroon) CMR | Yomby William | 28 | 1 | 24 | 1 | 2 | 0 | 2 | 0 |
| 3 | DF | (United States) USA | Shane Johnson | 19 | 1 | 17 | 1 | 2 | 0 | 0 | 0 |
| 4 | MF | (United States) USA | Luke Vercollone | 26 | 5 | 22 | 5 | 2 | 0 | 2 | 0 |
| 5 | MF | (United States) USA | Michael Callahan | 27 | 2 | 23 | 1 | 2 | 0 | 2 | 1 |
| 7 | FW | (England) ENG | Matthew Delicâte | 17 | 6 | 15 | 6 | 0 | 0 | 2 | 0 |
| 8 | MF | (United States) USA | Joseph Haboush | 12 | 1 | 11 | 1 | 1 | 0 | 0 | 0 |
| 9 | MF | (Colombia) COL | Juan Arbelaez | 15 | 0 | 13 | 0 | 0 | 0 | 2 | 0 |
| 10 | MF | (United States) USA | David Bulow | 8 | 1 | 6 | 1 | 1 | 0 | 1 | 0 |
| 11 | FW | (United States) USA | Evan Fowler | 1 | 0 | 1 | 0 | 0 | 0 | 0 | 0 |
| 12 | MF | (United States) USA | Brian Ownby (on loan from Houston Dynamo) | 19 | 7 | 17 | 7 | 0 | 0 | 2 | 0 |
| 14 | MF | (United States) USA | Nate Robinson | 27 | 4 | 23 | 4 | 2 | 0 | 2 | 0 |
| 15 | MF | (United States) USA | Vaughn Fowler | 1 | 0 | 1 | 0 | 0 | 0 | 0 | 0 |
| 16 | FW | (United States) USA | Casey Townsend (on loan from D.C. United) | 4 | 2 | 4 | 2 | 0 | 0 | 0 | 0 |
| 17 | FW | (United States) USA | Jason Yeisley | 14 | 1 | 13 | 1 | 1 | 0 | 0 | 0 |
| 18 | DF | (United States) USA | Alex Lee | 20 | 1 | 18 | 1 | 0 | 0 | 2 | 0 |
| 20 | MF | (Canada) CAN | Philippe Davies | 20 | 1 | 18 | 1 | 1 | 0 | 1 | 0 |
| 21 | MF | (United States) USA | Conor Shanosky (on loan from D.C. United) | 14 | 2 | 12 | 2 | 0 | 0 | 2 | 0 |
| 23 | DF | (Germany) GER | Sascha Görres | 22 | 0 | 19 | 0 | 1 | 0 | 2 | 0 |
| 24 | MF | (United States) USA | Collin Martin (on loan from D.C. United) | 1 | 0 | 1 | 0 | 0 | 0 | 0 | 0 |
| 25 | DF | (Uganda) UGA | Henry Kalungi | 24 | 0 | 20 | 0 | 2 | 0 | 2 | 0 |
| 27 | FW | (Zimbabwe) ZIM | Joseph Ngwenya | 22 | 11 | 18 | 9 | 2 | 1 | 2 | 1 |
| 29 | FW | (Jamaica) JAM | Michael Seaton (on loan from D.C. United) | 16 | 5 | 13 | 5 | 1 | 0 | 2 | 0 |
| 33 | DF | (United States) USA | Taylor Kemp (on loan from D.C. United) | 5 | 0 | 5 | 0 | 0 | 0 | 0 | 0 |
| 50 | GK | (United States) USA | Andrew Dykstra (on loan from D.C. United) | 24 | 0 | 20 | 0 | 2 | 0 | 2 | 0 |
| 99 | MF | (Zimbabwe) ZIM | Stanley Nyazamba | 22 | 4 | 18 | 2 | 2 | 2 | 2 | 0 |

== Transfers ==
=== In ===
| No. | Pos. | Player | Transferred from | Fee/notes | Date | Source |
|---|---|---|---|---|---|---|
| 8 | MF | (United States) Joseph Haboush | (United States) VCU Rams | Free | February 12, 2013 | |
| 18 | DF | (United States) Alex Lee | (United States) FC Dallas | Free | March 5, 2013 | |
| 9 | DF | (Colombia) Juan Arbelaez | (United States) VCU Rams | Free | March 15, 2013 | |
| 27 | MF | (Zimbabwe) Joseph Ngwenya | (United States) D.C. United | Free | April 11, 2013 | |

=== Out ===
| No. | Pos. | Player | Transferred to | Fee/notes | Date | Source |
|---|---|---|---|---|---|---|
| 9 | MF | (Japan) Nozomi Hiroyama | Unattached | Retirement | August 30, 2012 | |
| 22 | GK | (United States) Ronnie Pascale | Unattached | Retirement | November 14, 2012 | |
| | MF | (United States) Ryan Heins | Unattached | Not signed | | |
| | MF | (United States) Bobby Foglesong | Unattached | Not signed | | |
| | MF | (Brazil) Gerson Dos Santos | Unattached | Not signed | | |

=== Loan in ===
| No. | Pos. | Player | Loaned from | Start | End | Source |
|---|---|---|---|---|---|---|
| 50 | GK | (United States) Andrew Dykstra | D.C. United | April 3, 2013 | August 30, 2013 | |
| 33 | DF | (United States) Taylor Kemp | D.C. United | March 19, 2013 | August 30, 2013 | |
| 24 | MF | (United States) Collin Martin | D.C. United | July 17, 2013 | July 24, 2013 | |
| 12 | MF | (United States) Brian Ownby | Houston Dynamo | March 22, 2013 | August 30, 2013 | |
| 29 | FW | (Jamaica) Michael Seaton | D.C. United | March 19, 2013 | August 30, 2013 | |
| 21 | DF | (United States) Conor Shanosky | D.C. United | March 19, 2013 | August 30, 2013 | |
| 16 | FW | (United States) Casey Townsend | D.C. United | March 19, 2013 | August 30, 2013 | |

=== Loan out ===
| No. | Pos. | Player | Loaned to | Start | End | Source |
