= David Rosenbaum =

David Rosenbaum may refer to:

- David Rosenbaum (journalist) (1942–2006), American journalist
- David Rosenbaum (soccer) (born 1986), American soccer player
