= Ross MacKenzie =

Ross MacKenzie is the name of

- Ross MacKenzie (sprinter) (born 1946), Canadian sprinter
- Ross MacKenzie (footballer) (born 1984), Scottish footballer

== See also ==
- Ross McKenzie
