= Vaughn Fowler =

American professional soccer player

Personal information
- Date of birth: July 7, 1995 (age 31)
- Place of birth: Chester, Virginia, United States
- Height: 6 ft 0 in (1.83 m)
- Position: Midfielder

Youth career
- 2009–2013: Richmond Kickers

College career
Years	Team	Apps	(Gls)
2013–2017	Longwood Lancers	65	(1)

Senior career*
Years	Team	Apps	(Gls)
2013	Richmond Kickers	1	(0)
2018-2022	Pontypridd United A.F.C.	0	(0)
2022-	Taff's Well A.F.C.	69	(10)
- * Club domestic league appearances and goals as of March 13, 2023

Vaughn Fowler (born July 7, 1995) is an American professional soccer player.

== Career ==
On July 12, 2013, it was announced that Fowler, along with Evan Fowler, were promoted to the Richmond Kickers first-team, becoming the very first Academy graduates to make it to the first-team. Fowler then made his professional debut for the Kickers in the USL Pro on August 10 against the Dayton Dutch Lions in which he came on in the 84th minute for Sascha Görres as the Kickers won the game 5–2.

== Career statistics ==
As of October 6, 2013

Club	Season	League			Playoffs		Cup		Continental		Total	
Club	Season	Division	Apps	Goals	Apps	Goals	Apps	Goals	Apps	Goals	Apps	Goals
Richmond Kickers	2013	USL Pro	1	0	0	0	0	0	–		1	0
Career total			1	0	0	0	0	0	0	0	1	0
