= Roger Bothe =

American soccer player

Personal information
- Full name: Roger Randolph Bothe
- Date of birth: January 6, 1988 (age 38)
- Place of birth: Hampton, Virginia, United States
- Height: 6 ft 2 in (1.88 m)
- Position: Forward

Youth career
- 2002–2005: Richmond Kickers

College career
Years	Team	Apps	(Gls)
2006–2009	William and Mary Tribe		

Senior career*
Years	Team	Apps	(Gls)
2006–2008	Richmond Kickers Future	22	(0)
2010	Richmond Kickers	5	(0)
Total		27	(0)
- * Club domestic league appearances and goals

Roger Bothe (born January 6, 1988) is an American former soccer player.

== Career ==
=== Youth and college ===
Bothe grew up in Chester, Virginia, and attended Thomas Dale High School, where he won the Gatorade Virginia High School Player of the Year and VHSCA Group AAA Male Athlete of the Year awards in both 2005 and 2006.

He played college soccer at The College of William & Mary, where he received numerous accolades, including VaSID All-State First Team, All-CAA Second Team, NSCAA All-South Atlantic Region Second Team and Scholar All-American Second Team honors.

Bothe also spent seven years in the Richmond Kickers club youth system, joining the club as a U-15 Elite player in 2002 before graduating to the Richmond Kickers Future USL Premier Development League team in 2006.

=== Professional ===
Bothe turned professional in 2010 when he signed with the Richmond Kickers of the USL Second Division, and in doing so became the first player to rise from the youth to the pro ranks within the club. He made his professional debut on April 17, 2010, in a league match against Harrisburg City Islanders. He also taught mathematics at Thurson Middle School in Westwood, MA.

=== Current ===
Bothe is a soccer coach at Wellesley High School in Massachusetts.
