= Theophidack Nti =

Ghanaian footballer

Kofi Nti
Personal information
- Full name: Theophidack Nti
- Date of birth: 3 April 1977
- Place of birth: Accra, Ghana
- Date of death: 26 April 2017 (aged 40)
- Place of death: Richmond, Virginia, United States
- Position: Midfielder

Youth career
- 1999–2001: University of Ghana

Senior career*
Years	Team	Apps	(Gls)
2001	Madina United		
2001–2004	Nania F.C.		
2005	Richmond Kickers Future	24	(0)

International career
1995	U-20		
- * Club domestic league appearances and goals

Theophidack "Kofi" Nti (3 April 1977 – 26 April 2017) was a Ghanaian footballer.

== Career ==
He joined Nania F.C. from the second division side in Madina United in 2001, during this period he led the team to be promoted into the Ghanaian first division league. In 2003, he captained the team in its first major tournament in Switzerland in which Nania won a bronze medal, he won an MVP award in that tournament. In 2004, the team won a silver medal in Germany, during its second outing in Europe, Nti captained the team and won an award as one of the most outstanding midfielders of the tournament. He captained Nania in another tournament in Switzerland the same year in which Nania won a silver medal. In addition, Nti led Nania to qualify from the second division to the first division in August 2004, he moved in January 2005 to Richmond Kickers Future.

== College Experience and Honors ==
In college, Nti led the University of Ghana soccer team to win the University League in 1999, in 2001, he led the same team to win the first West African University games held in Ghana.

== International ==
Played with Ghanaian Under-20 National Team in 1995.

== Death ==
Nti died unexpectedly on 26 April 2017 at the age of 40.
