= Diego Martins (footballer, born 1983) =

Brazilian footballer

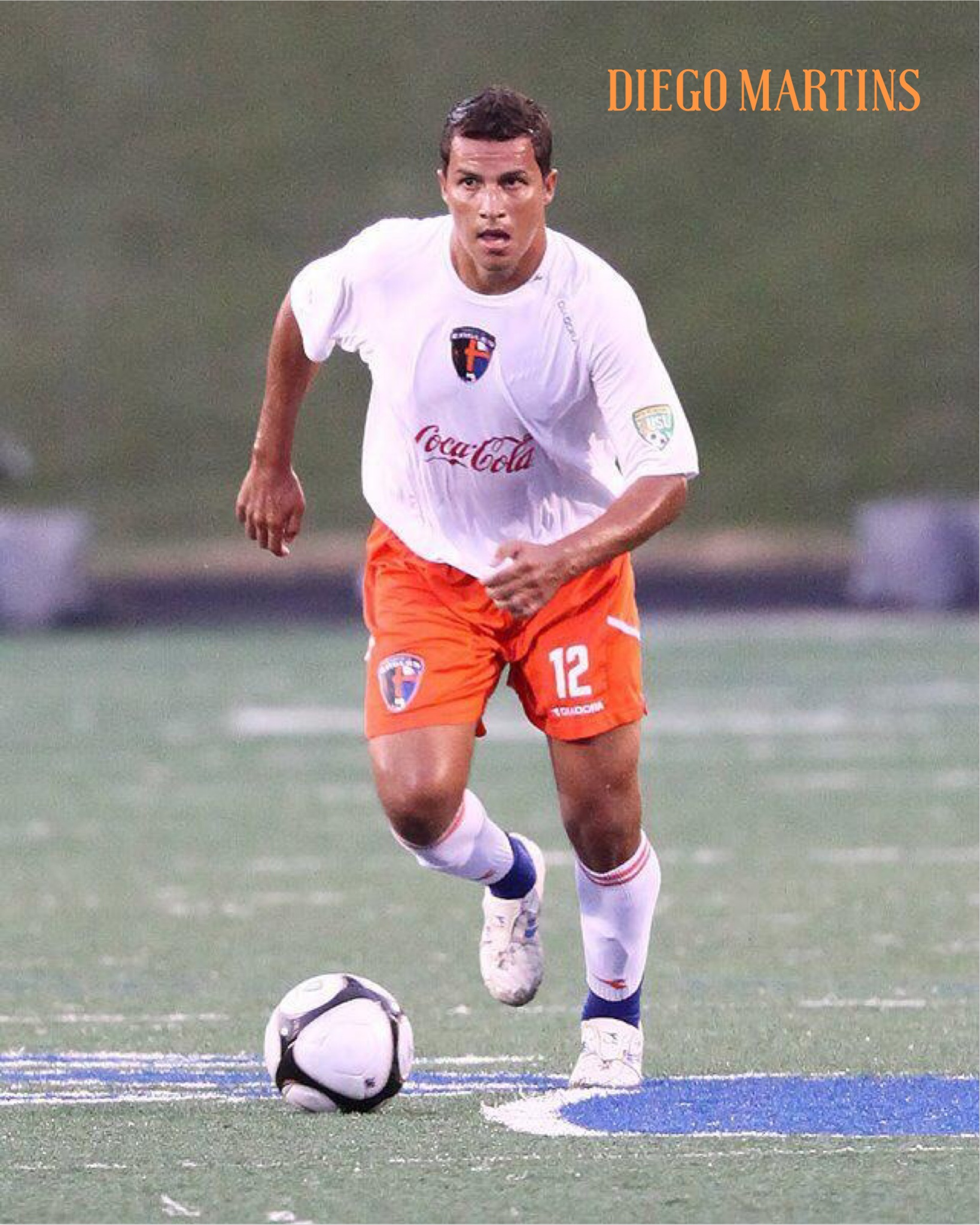

Personal information
- Full name: Diego José Martins
- Date of birth: June 19, 1983 (age 43)
- Place of birth: Porangatu, Brazil
- Height: 5 ft 11 in (1.80 m)
- Position: Midfielder

Team information
- Current team: Charlotte Eagles
- Number: 8

Youth career
- Gama

Senior career*
Years	Team	Apps	(Gls)
2003–2004	Gama		
2005	Capital FC		
2006	Anapolina		
2007–2008	Aves	1	(0)
2008	Anapolina		
2009	Ceilândia		
2009–	Charlotte Eagles	30	(4)
2011	Rochester Lancers (indoor)	1	(0)
- * Club domestic league appearances and goals as of February 25th, 2012

Diego José Martins (born June 19, 1983 in Porangatu) is a Brazilian footballer. His previous team was Charlotte Eagles in the USL Professional Division and Rochester Lancers.

== Career ==
=== Early career ===
Martins grew up playing in the youth system for Gama, where he played as an amateur for the Gama Júniors. Martins led his club to three amateur Brasília state championships, scoring 18 goals, before being called up to the senior Gama team in 2003, at age 17.

=== Professional ===
Martins won two professional Brasília state championships and a Brazilian Serie C National Championship with Gama, and was the team MVP in 2004; his performances with the team led to him signing with Capital FC in 2005. While playing for Capital, Martins scored a famous goal known as the "goal Pelé couldn't score", looping a shot over the opposition goalkeeper from 50 yards out.

Martins transferred to Anapolina of the Campeonato Brasileiro Série B in 2006, where he was nominated Player of the Week three times, and was the team's end-of-season MVP. His play with Anápolis caught the eye of Portuguese scouts, leading to him moving to Aves in the Portuguese Liga in 2007. After spending two years rubbing shoulders with teams such as Benfica, Sporting CP and FC Porto, Martins took an opportunity to move to the United States, and signed with the Charlotte Eagles of the USL Second Division in early 2009.
