= Adrian Bumbut =

Romanian footballer

Personal information
- Full name: Adrian Bumbut
- Date of birth: 17 August 1984 (age 42)
- Place of birth: Zalău, Romania
- Height: 5 ft 7 in (1.70 m)
- Position: Forward

College career
Years	Team	Apps	(Gls)
2004–2007	Liberty Flames		

Senior career*
Years	Team	Apps	(Gls)
2005	Carolina Dynamo	8	(1)
2006	Richmond Kickers Future	10	(4)
2007	Fredericksburg Gunners	15	(5)
2008–2009	Richmond Kickers	36	(5)
2008–2011	Baltimore Blast (indoor)	29	(11)
2010	Crystal Palace Baltimore	5	(0)

Managerial career
- 2011: Liberty Flames (assistant)
- * Club domestic league appearances and goals as of 12 May 2020

Adrian Bumbut (Romanian: Bumbuț; born 17 August 1984 in Zalău) is a Romanian former football player.

== Career ==
=== College and amateur ===
Bumbut moved from his native Romania to the United States as a child with his family, settling in Georgetown, South Carolina. He attended Georgetown High School and played college soccer for Liberty University, who he helped to its first-ever Big South Championship and an appearance in the NCAA Men's College Soccer Cup his senior season, and completed his career ranked fourth on the Liberty all-time points list with 79, while tying for fourth on the school's all-time goals list with 32. He was named to the All-Big South first team, the VaSID All-State first team and the All-South Atlantic Region second team as a senior.

During his college years he played also for Richmond Kickers Future and the Fredericksburg Gunners in the Premier Development League, earning PDL All-Eastern Conference team honors with the Gunners in 2007.

=== Professional ===
Bumbut was selected in the second round of the 2008 MLS Supplemental Draft by the Chicago Fire. He turned professional in 2008 when he signed with the Richmond Kickers in the USL Second Division. He made his professional debut on 19 April 2008 in Richmond's 3-0 opening day victory over the Western Mass Pioneers, and helped the Kickers to the 2009 USL Second Division championship.

Bumbut also plays professionally indoors. He has played three seasons with the Baltimore Blast; 2008–09, 2009–10 and 2010–11. He was named to the NISL 08-09 All-Rookie Team following his debut season with the Blast.

Bumbut returned to professional outdoor soccer in August 2010 when he signed to play for Crystal Palace Baltimore in the USSF Division 2 Professional League.

=== International ===
Bumbut played for the Romanian national U-16 team while in high school, but has never played for any of his country's senior teams.
