= Ihor Dotsenko =

Ukrainian-American soccer player (born 1974)

Personal information
- Date of birth: 29 July 1974 (age 52)
- Place of birth: Kyiv, Ukrainian SSR, USSR
- Height: 6 ft 2 in (1.88 m)
- Position: Forward

Youth career
- 1994–1997: Wake Forest University

Senior career*
Years	Team	Apps	(Gls)
1998–1999	Richmond Kickers	21	(11)
1999	Lehigh Valley Steam	16	(9)
2000–2001	Raleigh Capital Express	28	(15)
2000	→ Kansas City Wizards (loan)	2	(0)
2000	→ Houston Hotshots (loan)	6	(4)
2001	Atlanta Silverbacks	11	(2)
2001	→ KFC Uerdingen 05 (loan)	10	(3)
2002–2003	Richmond Kickers	46	(4)
2004	Richmond Kickers Future	10	(4)
2006–2007	Richmond Kickers	15	(0)

Managerial career
- 2006: Richmond Kickers (assistant)
- 2007: Richmond Kickers Future
- * Club domestic league appearances and goals

Ihor Dotsenko (born 29 July 1974) is a Ukrainian-American former professional soccer player who spent most of his career in the USL, but played two games with the Kansas City Wizards of Major League Soccer.

== Club career ==
Dotsenko, a native of Ukraine attended Wake Forest University where he played on the men's soccer team from 1994 to 1997. In 1998, he signed with the Richmond Kickers of the USISL. In the fall of 1998, he signed with the Philadelphia KiXX of the National Professional Soccer League (NPSL). He would play two indoor winter seasons with the KiXX. In 1999, Dotsenko moved to the expansion Lehigh Valley Steam of the USL A-League. The Steam folded at the end of the season and in 2000, Dotsenko joined the Raleigh Capital Express. In August 2000, the Kansas City Wizards of the Major Soccer League, an affiliate of the Express, called Dotsenko up to the senior team for two games. In October, the Wizards sent Dotsenko on loan to the Houston Hotshots of the World Indoor Soccer League. At the end of 2000, he signed with the Atlanta Silverbacks who then sent him on loan to KFC Uerdingen 05 in January 2001. Dotsenko returned to the indoor game with the Harrisburg Heat of the Major Indoor Soccer League, playing only one season with them. In 2002, Dotsenko returned to the Richmond Kickers, retiring in 2003. On 3 April 2006, Dotsenko returned to playing with the Kickers, retiring a second time in 2007.

== Coaching career ==
In 2002, Dotsenko became the assistant director of Coaching for the North Region of Richmond Kickers Youth Soccer Club (RKYSC). In 2004, he was elevated to the position of Technical Director of the RKYSC. On 3 April 2006, the Richmond Kickers announced that Dotsenko would serve as both a player and assistant coach with the team. On 16 February 2007, he became the head coach of the Richmond Kickers Future which play in the fourth division Premier Development League. He held that position for only the 2007 season.
