= Kelvin Jones (soccer) =

American soccer player & coach (born 1982)

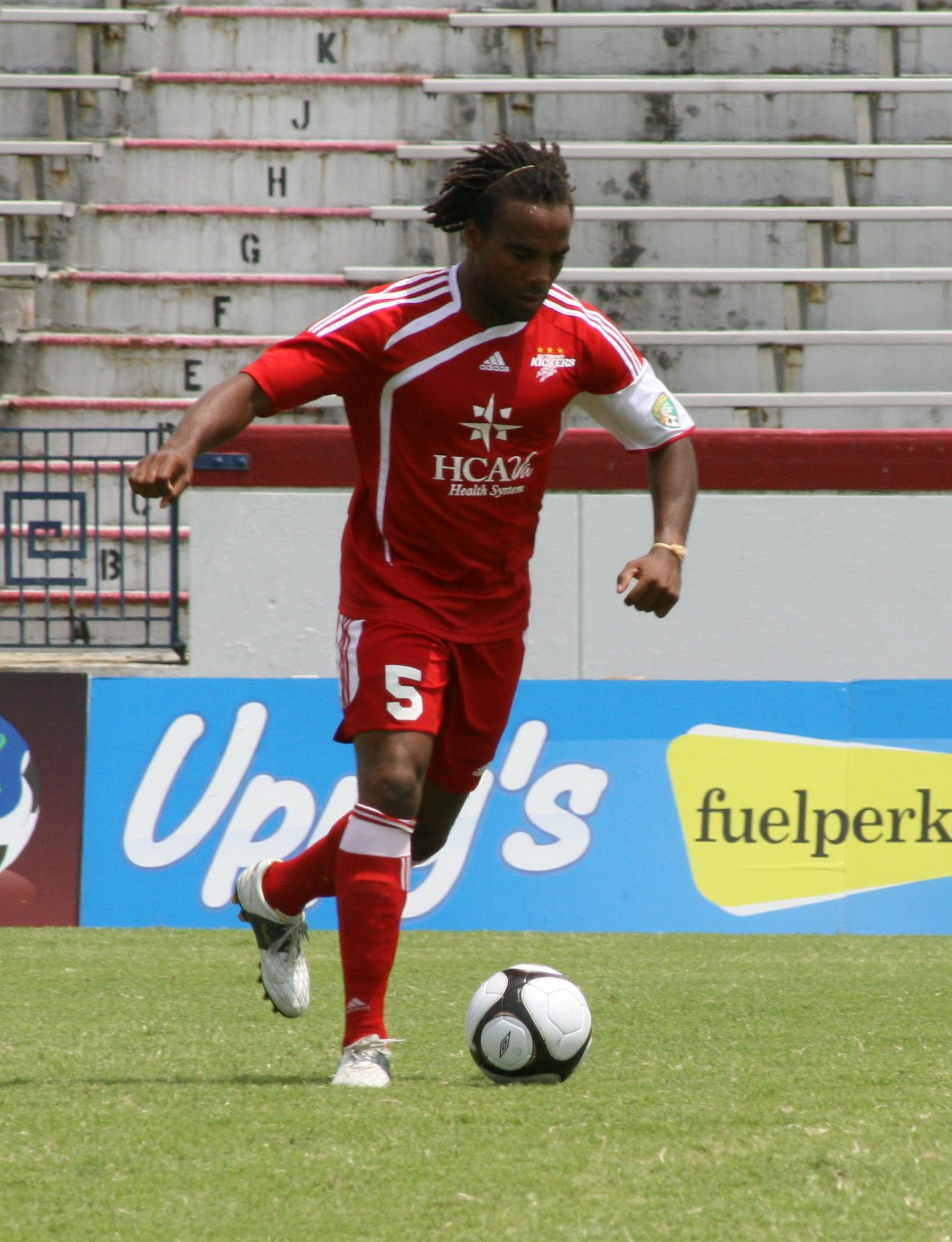

Personal information
- Date of birth: January 30, 1982 (age 44)
- Place of birth: Fredericksburg, Virginia, United States
- Height: 5 ft 11 in (1.80 m)
- Position: Defender

Youth career
- 2000–2003: Wake Forest Demon Deacons

Senior career*
Years	Team	Apps	(Gls)
2004–2005	Charleston Battery	12	(0)
2006–2009	Richmond Kickers	81	(2)

Managerial career
- 2017–2024: Columbus Crew (academy)
- 2024: Columbus Crew 2
- 2025–: San Diego FC (assistant)
- * Club domestic league appearances and goals as of 11 October 2009

Kelvin Jones (born January 30, 1982) is an American soccer coach and former player. He is an assistant coach for Major League Soccer club San Diego FC.

== Club career ==
=== Early career ===
Jones attended Massaponax High School, where he was named the 2000 Virginia High School Player of the Year, and was a member of the Region I ODP and adidas ESP Teams, and played college soccer at Wake Forest University, where he made 61 appearances over four seasons registered four goals and five assists.

=== Professional ===
Jones turned professional in 2004 when he signed with the Charleston Battery of the USL First Division. Injury limited his time with the Battery to just 12 appearances in two years, and he was waived by the team at the end of the 2005 season. He subsequently signed for the Richmond Kickers and has been with the team ever since, making over 80 appearances in total. He was part of the Richmond teams which won the USL Second Division championships in 2006 and 2009. Jones is one of the founders and player/coach of the semi-pro indoor soccer team the Fredericksburg Generals of the PASL.

== Coaching career ==
In 2017, Jones joined the Columbus Crew SC Academy as a head coach for their U-12 boys team. In September 2020 he was named the Crew SC Academy Director.

Jones was announced as head coach of Columbus Crew 2 on March 13, 2024. The team finished as runners-up in the Eastern Conference Final under Jones, who left the organization in December. He was named an assistant coach for MLS expansion team San Diego FC on December 18.
