= Ed Hayden =

American soccer player

Personal information
- Full name: Edward Hayden
- Date of birth: October 24, 1983 (age 43)
- Place of birth: Olney, Maryland, United States
- Height: 6 ft 2 in (1.88 m)
- Position: Defender

Youth career
- 2002–2003: Saint Francis Red Flash
- 2004–2005: Monmouth Hawks

Senior career*
Years	Team	Apps	(Gls)
2006	Richmond Kickers	10	(0)
2007	Atlantic City Diablos		
2008–2010	Pittsburgh Riverhounds	41	(3)
- * Club domestic league appearances and goals as of August 25, 2010

Ed Hayden (born October 24, 1983, in Olney, Maryland) is an American soccer player who last played for Pittsburgh Riverhounds in the USL Second Division.

== Career ==
=== College ===
Hayden attended Magruder High School in Rockville, Maryland, played youth soccer with the Olney Metro-Stars and the Baltimore Bays, and played college soccer at Saint Francis University and Monmouth University. He was Monmouth's Soccer MVP in 2004, and earned Second Team All-NEC in 2004, and First Team All NEC-in 2005.

=== Professional ===
Hayden turned professional in 2006 when he signed with the Richmond Kickers in the USL Second Division. He made his professional debut on April 23, 2006, in Richmond's opening day defeat to the Cincinnati Kings, but later helped them secure the 2006 USL2 regular season title.

After spending a year with the Atlantic City Diablos in the amateur National Premier Soccer League in 2007, Hayden returned to the professional ranks in 2008 with the Pittsburgh Riverhounds. On March 8, 2010, Pittsburgh announced the re-signing of Hayden to a new contract for the 2010 season.
