= Dave Hertel =

American retired soccer player (born 1986)

Personal information
- Full name: David Hertel
- Date of birth: March 7, 1986 (age 40)
- Place of birth: Holland, Michigan, United States
- Height: 5 ft 10 in (1.78 m)
- Positions: Midfielder; forward

College career
Years	Team	Apps	(Gls)
2004–2008	Michigan State Spartans		

Senior career*
Years	Team	Apps	(Gls)
2005–2007	West Michigan Edge	44	(0)
2008–2009	Michigan Bucks	29	(10)
2009	Real Maryland Monarchs	4	(0)
2010–2011	Richmond Kickers	39	(0)
Total		116	(10)
- * Club domestic league appearances and goals

Dave Hertel (born March 7, 1986) is an American former professional soccer player.

== Career ==
=== Youth and college ===
Hertel attended Holland Christian High School where he won a state championship, and was named 1st team All state, Dream team, and voted as the best player in Division 2. He also finished 3rd in votes for Mr. Soccer. He played club for Grand Valley Premier, Kalamazoo TKO, and the Michigan Wolves, the Wolves at that time were ranked 3rd in the country. Hertel also participated on the state ODP team from 2001 to 2004, and was given the honor to play for the Regional ODP team from 2002 to 2004 travelling to Brazil and Chula Vista playing against the U-17 US national team, and also games against Santos Juniors and Flamengos Juniors. Collegiately he played soccer at the University of Kentucky and Michigan State University, where at Kentucky he was a part of a team that won a MAC championship in 2004. He then transferred to MSU where he was named to the Big Ten All-Championship team as a junior in 2007. In 2008 was a first team all big ten selection, also in 2008 the Spartans went on to win both regular season and conference tournament for the first time in school history. He was 2nd team all region, and was one of 65 collegiate soccer players to attend the 2009 MLS Combine

During his college years he also played for the West Michigan Edge and the Michigan Bucks in the USL Premier Development League, being named to the PDL All-League Team in 2009. Also, he led the team in goals and points, playing in the midfield.

=== Professional ===
After his senior season at MSU 2008, he was red tagged out of college by Real Salt Lake of the MLS. He didn't sign with the club and Following the conclusion of his standout 2009 PDL season, Hertel was signed by the Real Maryland Monarchs in the USL Second Division. He made his professional debut on August 1, 2009, in a 1–0 loss to the Richmond Kickers. On March 9, 2010, Richmond Kickers announced the signing of Hertel to a contract for the 2010 season. Also in 2010 Hertel was named to the USL second team in his first season with the kickers. The Kickers also made it to the championship match, losing to the Charleston Battery. Hertel played for the Kickers in 2011 and was a part of the team that finished 4th in the U.S. Open Cup. On that run they beat the Columbus Crew at Columbus Crew Stadium and Sporting Kansas City; they would end up losing to Chicago Fire in the Semi Finals 2–1. He chose not re-signed for 2012.
