= John DiRaimondo =

American soccer player

Personal information
- Full name: John DiRaimondo
- Date of birth: April 23, 1986 (age 40)
- Place of birth: St. Louis, Missouri, United States
- Height: 5 ft 8 in (1.73 m)
- Position: Midfielder

Youth career
- 2003–2006: St. Louis Billikens

Senior career*
Years	Team	Apps	(Gls)
2005–2006	Chicago Fire Premier	22	(5)
2007–2009	Colorado Rapids	11	(1)
2009	D.C. United	1	(0)
2009	→ Harrisburg City Islanders (loan)	1	(0)
2009	→ Richmond Kickers (loan)	5	(2)

International career
2003	United States U-17	6	(2)
- United States U-20
- * Club domestic league appearances and goals as of 22 March 2010

John DiRaimondo (born April 23, 1986, in St. Louis, Missouri) is an American former soccer player.

== Career ==
=== Youth ===
DiRaimondo went through an accelerated high school program at St. Louis University High that allowed him to graduate a year early alongside fellow soccer player and childhood friend Brian Grazier. While on the team, DiRaimondo lived in Florida and was roommates with Grazier. In 2003, he was named as the Parade Magazine All-American and competed in the McDonald's All-American game. DiRaimondo received Student-Athlete of the Year in 2001 and completed high school being on the honor roll all four years.

=== College ===
DiRaimondo attended St. Louis University; in 2003 he scored four goals and got ten assists while being named second-team NSCAA All-Midwest Region, and was named to the Virginia Adidas Classic All-Tournament team. In 2004, he scored four goals and got three assists while being named first team All-Conference. In 2005, he scored a career high of nine goals and ten assists while being named first team All-Conference and All-Region. He also made it to the Hermann Trophy Watch list. In his last year of college, DiRaimondo scored five goals and got five assists while being named a Hermann Trophy semifinalist. ESPN the Magazine named him Academic All-American. During his college years he also played with Chicago Fire Premier in the USL Premier Development League.

=== Professional ===
DiRaimondo was drafted by Major League Soccer's Colorado Rapids on January 18, 2007, and was drafted by Minnesota Thunder of the USL First Division on January 24, 2007. He made his debut for the Rapids on March 29, 2008, and scored his first professional goal the following week against the Kansas City Wizards.

DiRaimondo was waived by the Rapids on March 25, 2009, and was signed to a developmental contract by D.C. United, on March 27, 2009. He was loaned to the Harrisburg City Islanders of the USL Second Division in April 2009 and later to Richmond Kickers in May 2009.

=== International ===
He was selected for the United States U-17 national team after his freshman year and managed to score two goals for the Under-17 World Cup qualifier in Guatemala. In 2003, he competed for the U.S. Under-17 National Team at the 2003 FIFA U-17 World Championship in Finland, and in 2004 played with the U.S. Under-20 National Team in a tour of Korea.

== Honors ==
=== Richmond Kickers ===
- USL Second Division Champions (1): 2009
