= Joey Worthen =

American soccer player and coach (born 1979)

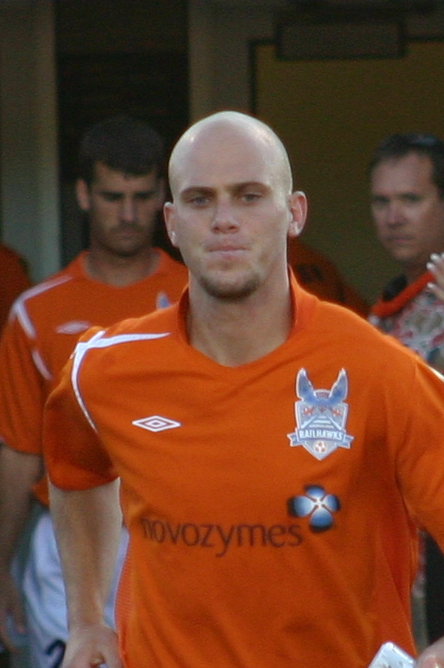
- Worthen with Carolina RailHawks

Personal information
- Date of birth: December 3, 1979 (age 46)
- Place of birth: Salt Lake City, Utah, United States
- Height: 6 ft 1 in (1.85 m)
- Position: Forward

Team information
- Current team: Florida Atlantic Owls (head coach)

Youth career
- 1998–2001: University of South Carolina

Senior career*
Years	Team	Apps	(Gls)
2000	Cape Cod Crusaders	14	(5)
2002–2003	Pittsburgh Riverhounds	51	(1)
2004–2005	Richmond Kickers	37	(7)
2006	Real Salt Lake	3	(0)
2007–2008	Carolina RailHawks	27	(3)
2009	Richmond Kickers	17	(3)
2010	Austin Aztex	15	(0)

International career
1999	United States U-20		

Managerial career
- 2012–2016: South Carolina Gamecocks (assistant)
- 2017–: Florida Atlantic Owls
- * Club domestic league appearances and goals

Joey Worthen (born December 3, 1979) is an American former soccer player and the current head coach of the Florida Atlantic Owls men's soccer program.

== Playing Career ==
=== High School ===
Worthen attended Cottonwood High School where he was named to the Parade High School All-America soccer team in 1998.

=== College ===
He played college soccer at the University of South Carolina in 1998, but after his freshman season he withdrew from school to play for the United States U-20 men's national soccer team. He returned to South Carolina in 1999 and continued until his senior season in 2001. Worthen was a four-year starter and served as team captain during his senior year.

During his career, the Gamecocks posted 50 victories and appeared in the NCAA Division I men's soccer tournament in 1998, 2000, and 2001. Worthen finished with 25 goals (including 12 game-winners) and 15 assists for 65 points; he earned Independent Rookie of the Year honors in 1998 and was named to the NSCAA/adidas First Team All-South in 2001.

=== Amateur ===
Worthen also played with the Cape Cod Crusaders in the USL Premier Development League in 2000, appearing in 14 matches and scoring 5 goals.

=== Professional ===
Worthen turned professional and was drafted in the second round of the A-League College Draft by the Pittsburgh Riverhounds. In his first season (2002) he appeared in all 28 games and was named the Riverhounds' Rookie of the Year after leading the team in assists (7), minutes played, games played, and games started.

He transferred to the Richmond Kickers in 2004, spending two seasons there and advancing to the 2005 USL Championship Game. In March 2006, he signed with Real Salt Lake of Major League Soccer.

On April 11, 2007, Worthen signed with the expansion Carolina RailHawks of the USL First Division (later NASL). He returned to the Kickers on February 17, 2009, and helped them win the 2009 USL Second Division championship.

He transferred to the Austin Aztex just before the 2010 USSF Division 2 Professional League season, concluding his nine-year professional career.

=== International ===
Worthen played for the United States U-20 men's national soccer team in 1999, but has never been called into the senior team.

== Coaching career ==
=== South Carolina Gamecocks, assistant coach, 2012–2016 ===
From 2012 to 2016, Worthen was an assistant coach for the South Carolina Gamecocks men's soccer program under head coach Mark Berson.

Over his five seasons on the USC staff, the Gamecocks compiled a 39–33–6 overall record while competing in Conference USA. The tenure was highlighted by a trip to the C-USA Championship final in 2014, hosting back-to-back NCAA Tournament first-round games (2015 and 2016), and advancing to the NCAA Tournament second round in both 2015 and 2016.

Worthen contributed to recruiting and coaching 22 Conference USA All-Conference honorees, one Freshman All-American, and nine players who went on to sign professional contracts.

=== Florida Atlantic Owls, head coach, 2017–current ===
On February 14, 2017, Worthen was named the head coach of the Florida Atlantic Owls men's soccer team ahead of the 2017 NCAA Division I men's soccer season.

Worthen has led the Owls since 2017, becoming the program's fifth head coach and the first since Kos Donev's tenure (1987–2016). The early years were difficult, with a combined 4–27–0 record in 2017 and 2018 in Conference USA (C-USA). Improvement began in 2019 (.469 winning percentage), followed by back-to-back winning seasons in the spring 2020 (6–4–2) and fall 2021 (9–7–3)—the first such streak since 2003–04. In 2021, FAU reached the C-USA Tournament final for the first time since 2007, upsetting the defending NCAA champion Marshall in the semifinals before falling 2–1 in overtime to Kentucky.

FAU transitioned to the American Athletic Conference (AAC) in 2022. Through the 2024 season, Worthen's record stood at approximately 47–69–15 over eight seasons (including conference play and non-conference), with progress marked by multiple All-AAC selections, an AAC Offensive Player of the Year award (Mamadou Diarra in 2024), and consecutive AAC Tournament appearances in 2023 and 2024.

The 2025 season marked the program's most successful under Worthen. FAU shared the AAC regular-season title (10–3–2 overall entering postseason), then won the AAC Tournament championship with a 3–2 comeback victory over FIU in the final on November 15, 2025—the program's second conference tournament title ever and first since 2007. This earned an automatic berth to the 2025 NCAA Division I men's soccer tournament, the program's first-ever NCAA appearance. The Owls fell in the first round to UCF, 3–2.

== Honors ==
Richmond Kickers

- USL Second Division: 2009
