= David Rosenbaum (soccer) =

American soccer player

Personal information
- Date of birth: December 28, 1986 (age 39)
- Place of birth: Washington, D.C., United States
- Height: 5 ft 11 in (1.80 m)
- Position: Forward

Youth career
- 2004–2005: Virginia Cavaliers
- 2006–2008: VCU Rams

Senior career*
Years	Team	Apps	(Gls)
2007–2008	Richmond Kickers Future	25	(2)
2009	Richmond Kickers	3	(0)
- * Club domestic league appearances and goals as of 11 October 2009

David Rosenbaum (born December 28, 1986, in Washington, D.C.) is an American soccer player who most recently played for Richmond Kickers in the USL Second Division.

== Career ==
=== Youth and college ===
Rosenbaum attended Woodrow Wilson High School and played college soccer at the University of Virginia, making 28 appearances over two seasons, before transferring to Virginia Commonwealth University as a junior.

He also played two years for Richmond Kickers Future in the USL Premier Development League, where he amassed nearly 1,800 minutes while contributing two goals and three assists.

=== Professional ===
Rosenbaum turned professional in 2009 when he signed with the Richmond Kickers in the USL Second Division. He made his professional debut on April 25, 2009, in a 1–1 tie with the Pittsburgh Riverhounds, but was limited to just three first team appearances in his rookie season.
