= Bobby Foglesong =

American soccer player

Personal information
- Full name: Robert Foglesong
- Date of birth: February 8, 1987 (age 39)
- Place of birth: Fredericksburg, Virginia, United States
- Height: 5 ft 11 in (1.80 m)
- Position: Midfielder

Youth career
- 2005–2008: Old Dominion Monarchs

Senior career*
Years	Team	Apps	(Gls)
2008	Richmond Kickers Future	16	(1)
2009	Hampton Roads Piranhas	13	(1)
2010–2012	Richmond Kickers	44	(3)
- * Club domestic league appearances and goals

Robert Foglesong (born February 8, 1987) is an American former soccer player.

== Career ==
=== Youth and college ===
Foglesong attended Stafford Senior High School, where he won three All-District first team honors, and was an All-Region first team, All-Metro, and All-State Honorable Mention honors during senior season, before playing four years of college soccer at Old Dominion University.

Having been a member of the Richmond Kickers Super Y-League program for several seasons, Foglesong also played with the Richmond Kickers Future and the Hampton Roads Piranhas in the USL Premier Development League.

=== Professional ===
Foglesong turned professional in 2010 when he signed with the Richmond Kickers of the USL Second Division. He made his professional debut on April 24, 2010, in a league match against the Charlotte Eagles, and scored his first professional goal on June 6 in a 3–1 win over Charleston Battery.
