= Gerson dos Santos (footballer, born 1982) =

Brazilian footballer

Personal information
- Full name: Gerson Pereira dos Santos Filho
- Date of birth: June 15, 1982 (age 44)
- Place of birth: São Paulo, Brazil
- Height: 6 ft 1 in (1.85 m)
- Position: Midfielder

College career
Years	Team	Apps	(Gls)
2006–2008	VCU Rams		

Senior career*
Years	Team	Apps	(Gls)
2007	Richmond Kickers Future	1	(0)
2009–2012	Richmond Kickers	58	(5)
2011–2012	Norfolk SharX (indoor)	17	(12)
Total		59	(5)
- * Club domestic league appearances and goals

Gerson Pereira dos Santos Filho (born June 15, 1982) is a Brazilian retired footballer.

== Career ==
=== College and amateur ===
Dos Santos played for several youth clubs in his native Brazil, including C.A. Juventus and Foz Cataratas E.C., before moving to the United States in 2005 to attend and play college soccer at Virginia Commonwealth University. He made 45 appearances with the VCU Rams over three seasons, scoring 10 goals and 9 assists, earning All-CAA First Team honors in his sophomore season, and being named co-Player of the Year in his senior year.

Dos Santos also spent the 2007 season with Richmond Kickers Future in the USL Premier Development League.

=== Professional ===
Dos Santos graduated from college one year early and turned professional in 2009 when he signed with the Richmond Kickers in the USL Second Division. He made his professional debut on April 18, 2009 in Richmond's 2-2 opening day tie with the Harrisburg City Islanders, and helped the Kickers to the 2009 USL Second Division championship.

=== Coaching ===
In addition to his playing career, Dos Santos managed many youth teams.

== Honors ==
=== Richmond Kickers ===
- USL Second Division Champions (1): 2009
