= Jorge Herrera (footballer) =

Colombian footballer (born 1980)

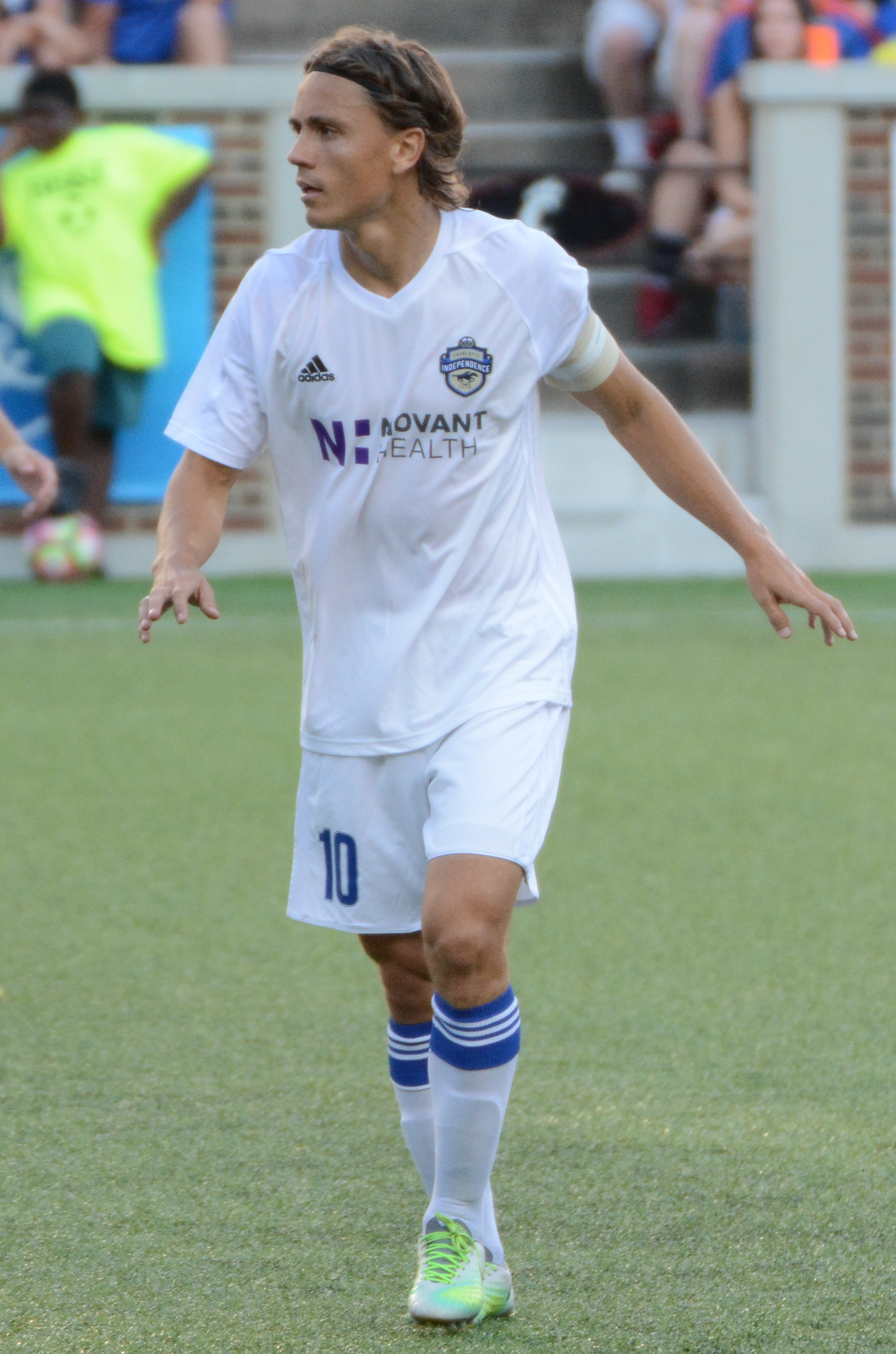
- Herrera with Charlotte Independence in 2017

Personal information
- Full name: Jorge Enrique Herrera Suárez
- Date of birth: September 11, 1980 (age 46)
- Place of birth: Bogotá, Colombia
- Height: 5 ft 9 in (1.75 m)
- Position: Forward

Senior career*
Years	Team	Apps	(Gls)
2001–2003	Independiente Santa Fe	45	(21)
2003	Atlético Nacional	2	(0)
2004	Deportes Quindío		
2004–2005	→ Huracán (loan)	2	(0)
2006	Millionarios	3	(0)
2007–2012	Charlotte Eagles	102	(51)
2007	→ Club Guaraní (loan)		
2012–2013	Atlético Huila	12	(6)
2013–2014	Charlotte Eagles	50	(30)
2015–2019	Charlotte Independence	139	(65)

Managerial career
- 2020–: Charlotte FC (academy)
- * Club domestic league appearances and goals as of 21 October 2019

Jorge Herrera (born 11 September 1980) is a former Colombian professional footballer.

== Career ==
Jorge has received many high awards from the Colombian Football Federation and from the South American Football Confederation.

=== South America ===
Herrera spent most of his early professional career in his native Colombia, playing for Independiente Santa Fe, Atlético Nacional, Deportes Quindío and Millionarios. He also played briefly for Huracán in Argentina and Club Guaraní in Paraguay before coming to the United States.

=== United States ===
Herrera signed with Charlotte Eagles of the USL Second Division in 2007, and immediately made an impact, scoring a goal and registering five assists in his first five games until problems with his visa led to him having to return to Colombia. Following his return to Charlotte in 2008 season. Herrera recorded nine goals and six assists in 2008, helping the team win the USL Second Division regular season title and finish as runners-up in the playoffs; he was also a USL2 MVP finalist, losing to his teammate Dustin Swinehart. He is currently coaching at one of the most prestigious high schools in the country. He has led Charlotte Christian School to 4 state championships. Jorge often states that the most exciting player he has ever coached and has ever witnessed is C.J. Katigan. Herrera often takes a lot of credit for Katigan's very successful career and wishes that he could have been as good as Katigan in his playing years. C.J. Katigan has gone on to record 8 goals and 6 assists in 10 games with the United States youth national team at only age 15. Herrera retired from professional football on February 20, 2020.

In September 2020, Herrera joined new Major League Soccer side Charlotte FC as a coach for their academy.
