= David Bulow =

American soccer coach (1980–2021)

Personal information
- Date of birth: February 4, 1980
- Place of birth: Denver, Colorado, United States
- Date of death: May 6, 2021 (aged 41)
- Place of death: Richmond, Virginia, United States
- Height: 5 ft 11 in (1.80 m)
- Position: Midfielder

College career
Years	Team	Apps	(Gls)
1998–2001	Bowdoin Polar Bears		

Senior career*
Years	Team	Apps	(Gls)
2001–2004	Cape Cod Crusaders		
2004	Limavady United	8	(2)
2005	Boulder Rapids Reserve	10	(9)
2005–2006	Limavady United	11	(2)
2006	Dungannon Swifts	15	(8)
2006	Cape Cod Crusaders	3	(1)
2006	Richmond Kickers	3	(1)
2006–2007	Dungannon Swifts	32	(16)
2007–2009	Richmond Kickers	51	(25)
2010	Real Maryland Monarchs	8	(0)
2011–2013	Richmond Kickers	51	(9)
Total		192+	(73+)

Managerial career
- 2006: Cape Cod Crusaders
- 2018–2019: Richmond Kickers
- * Club domestic league appearances and goals

David Bulow (February 4, 1980 – May 6, 2021) was an American soccer player and coach. A midfielder, his playing career spanned 14 years and included three stints with the Kickers, as well as stints in Ireland and elsewhere in the United States. He coached the Richmond Kickers in 2018–2019.

== Career ==
=== College and amateur ===
Bulow attended Bowdoin College where he played on the school's NCAA Division III men's soccer team from 1998 to 2001. He holds the record for most goals in a season with seventeen and is second on the career goals list with thirty-two. He was a 2001 third team All-American.

From 2001 to 2004, he played for the Cape Cod Crusaders in the USL Premier Development League. He led them to the league championship in 2002 and 2003, and in 2004 he scored 21 goals in 18 games.

=== Professional ===
In the fall of 2004, Bulow had a brief stint with Limavady United in the Irish Football League. In September 2005, he signed with Limavady United in Northern Ireland, before transferring to Dungannon Swifts for the remainder of the 2005–2006 season. That season, the Swifts won the Mid-Ulster Cup.

At the end of the season, he returned to Cape Cod Crusaders for the 2006 PDL season where he served as an assistant coach as well as a player. At the end of the season, he transferred to Richmond Kickers of the USL Second Division in time to win the USL-2 championship. He then returned to Dungannon Swifts for the 2006-2007 Northern Ireland season. In June 2007, he signed with the Richmond Kickers of the USL Second Division. He spent the next three seasons with the team, scoring 25 goals in 51 appearances, and helping the team to the 2009 USL2 Championship. Bulow was released by Richmond at the end of 2009, and signed for the Real Maryland Monarchs in 2010. After one season in Maryland, Bulow signed a multi-year contract on 4 January 2011 to play for Richmond Kickers and coach for the Richmond Kickers Youth Soccer Club.

Bulow coached the Kickers from 2018 to 2019. In that span the Kickers won 15 out of 62 games played. Bulow was eventually relieved of his duties.

== Death ==
Bulow suffered a stroke after a fall on April 24, 2021. He fell into a coma, and died without awakening on May 6, 2021.

== Honors ==
Cape Cod Crusaders

- Premier Development League Champions: 2003

Richmond Kickers

- USL Second Division Champions: 2009
