= Matthew Delicâte =

English footballer

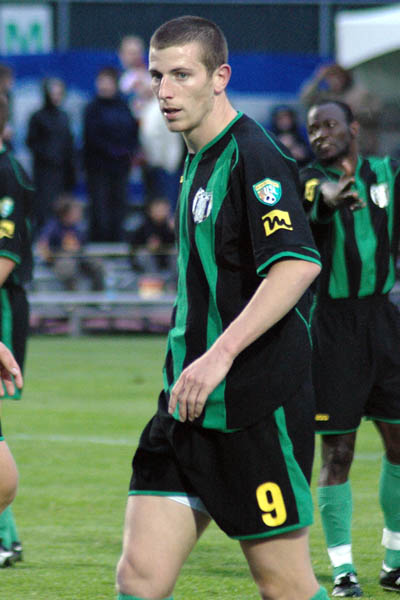

Personal information
- Date of birth: 7 February 1982 (age 44)
- Place of birth: Kent, England
- Position: Forward

College career
Years	Team	Apps	(Gls)
2000–2003	VCU Rams		

Senior career*
Years	Team	Apps	(Gls)
1999–2001	Carmarthen Town	32	(11)
2003–2004	Richmond Kickers Future	34	(25)
2004–2005	Richmond Kickers	52	(19)
2006–2008	Rochester Rhinos	76	(19)
2008	Ebbsfleet United	3	(0)
2009–2016	Richmond Kickers	173	(76)
2009	→ Carolina RailHawks (loan)	4	(0)
Total		374	(150)
- * Club domestic league appearances and goals

Matthew Delicâte (born 7 February 1982) is an English former footballer who played for Richmond Kickers in the United Soccer League.

== Career ==
=== College and amateur ===
Born in England, Delicâte grew up in Boncath in Wales, and began his playing career in at the age of 17, playing for Carmarthen Town in the League of Wales during the 1999–2000 season. After scoring a hat-trick on his Carmarthen debut in a 6–1 away win at Haverfordwest County in August 1999, he was a regular scorer until he departed the following April after making 12 league starts when he was awarded a college soccer scholarship at Virginia Commonwealth University.

Delicâte played at VCU from 2000 to 2003 where he was CAA Player of the year and a second team All American, holding career records for goals (44) and points (101). In 2000, Delicâte was the only freshman to play in every game, starting 13. He led the team in goals with six and was named to the Nike/ALLTELL Soccer Classic all-tournament team. In 2001, he was a second-team All-CAA selection and led the Rams in goals scored with 11. He ranked third in the CAA in that category and fifth in total points with 22.

In 2002, he recorded career highs in goals with (12) and points with (26) en route to being named second team All-Colonial Athletic Association for the second straight year. He also made the All-Virginia second team and ranked second in goals and fifth in points in the CAA. He earned MVP honours at the CAA tournament and was selected to Verizon Academic All-American third team. In 2003 Delicâte led the VCU men's soccer team in scoring with 39 points (15 goals, nine assists), the third highest in school history. He was the 2003 Colonial Athletic Association Player of the Year. Delicâte led the league in scoring as well. The 2003 Virginia State Player of the Year was inducted into the VCU Hall of Fame in 2017.

Delicâte played for the Richmond Kickers Future of the USL Premier Development League in 2003 and 2004, scoring 25 goals in 34 games and helping them win the PDL Mid-Atlantic division in 2003.

=== Professional ===
Delicâte turned professional in 2004 with the Richmond Kickers in the USL First Division, finishing his debut season as the Kickers second leading scorer with 20 points. Recording the most assists on the team with six, he appeared in 34 games. In 2005, his second season with the Kickers, he led the team in scoring with 12 goals and 2 assists for 26 points. Delicâte recorded more game-winning goals than any other player with four. Delicâte was responsible for 3 of the 4 goals against Rochester during the USL First Division semifinals, leading the team to the championship game.

Delicâte left the Kickers when they moved down to the USL Second Division after the 2005 season, and signed with the Rochester Rhinos. In his 2006 season with the Rhinos Delicâte finished the season as their leading scorer with 19 points, placing in the top ten in the league in points and goals. Delicâte started the season off strong in 2007 and was the top scorer on the team before suffering a broken jaw mid-season. He finished the season with 13 points in second place on the team. In 2008 Delicâte finished third in scoring with five goals and three assists for a total of 13 points. He is on the team's all-time scoring list with 19 regular season goals over three seasons.

After the 2008 season, Delicâte then had a brief stint with Ebbsfleet United in the English Conference National before returning to the Richmond Kickers for the 2009 season. Delicâte finished the 2009 regular season with 13 goals and two assists for a total of 28 points. He was named the 2009 USL-2 Goal scoring Champion and was also named to the USL-2 All-League First Team and was a finalist for League MVP. Delicâte's goal in the 120th minute of the semifinal game carried the Kickers into the USL-2 championship game which they went on to win 3–1 against the Charlotte Eagles. On January 14, 2010, Richmond announced the re-signing of Delicâte for the 2010 season.

On September 24 Delicâte was named on a three-man short list for the 2014 USL PRO MVP award, having finished as the second highest scorer in the league that season.

On February 13, 2017, Delicâte announced his retirement from professional soccer. Delicâte made 249 appearances over 10 seasons in Richmond, the Kickers' all-time leading scorer amassed 113 career goals and 28 career assists.

== Honours ==
Richmond Kickers

- USL Second Division Champions: 2009
- USL Second Division Goal Scoring Champion, MVP Finalist and All League First Team: 2009
- USL Pro Regular Season Champions: 2013
- USL Pro MVP Finalist and All League First Team: 2014
