= Michael Burke (soccer) =

American soccer player (born 1977)

Personal information
- Full name: Michael Burke
- Date of birth: February 25, 1977 (age 49)
- Place of birth: Jacksonville, Florida, U.S.
- Height: 5 ft 7 in (1.70 m)
- Position: Midfielder

College career
Years	Team	Apps	(Gls)
1996–1997	Loyola Greyhounds		

Senior career*
Years	Team	Apps	(Gls)
1998	Jacksonville Cyclones	24	(14)
1998–1999	Charleston Battery	27	(16)
2000	D.C. United	7	(0)
2000	Dallas Burn	2	(0)
2000–2012	Richmond Kickers	261	(36)
2002	→ D.C. United (loan)	0	(0)
Total		327	(58)

Managerial career
- 2011–20??: Richmond Kickers (assistant)
- * Club domestic league appearances and goals as of July 13, 2012

Michael Burke (born February 25, 1977) is an American retired soccer player.

== Career ==
=== College and amateur ===
Burke attended Loyola University Maryland, playing two seasons of college soccer. In 1997, he left college early for personal reasons. His professional soccer career started in his hometown of Jacksonville, FL. He spent time with Deportivo Cali in Colombia and Nottingham Forest in England.

=== Professional ===
Burke began his professional career in 1998 when he signed with the Jacksonville Cyclones of the A-League. Late in the season, Michael Burke asked to be released to pursue other teams. After Burke sat out for a week of training, the club agreed to trade him to the Charleston Battery and Burke was named the 1998 USL A-League Rookie of the Year.

Burke was drafted in the fourth round (41st overall) in the 2000 MLS SuperDraft by D.C. United. He played seven games for United before being released on June 2, 2000. He then signed with the Dallas Burn on June 15, and played two games in Dallas before being released on June 30.

Burke signed with the Richmond Kickers the next day and has remained with that team since then, playing over 200 games and scoring over 25 goals during his tenure. Burke earned Supporter's Choice MVP honors in 2005, 2006, 2007, 2008, and 2009. He garnered the MVP award of the USL2 Championship game in 2006, was the USL2 Most Valuable Player and was named Kickers' captain in 2007, was a USL-2 MVP Finalist in 2006, 2007, and 2008 and All-League First Team midfielder in 2006–09, and led the Kickers to his second USL2 championship in 2009. He also had a loan stint with D.C. United when he was called up as a backup for injured players early in 2002 for the 2002 CONCACAF Champions' Cup. He then played the game against Comunicaciones F.C. on March 6.

Burke came out of retirement in 2012 to make a final push for the playoffs. He recorded 2 assists during this short stint.

== Honors ==
- 1998 USL 1 Rookie of the Year
- 1999 Charleston Battery Supporters Choice MVP
- 2005-2009 USL 1 Richmond Kickers Supporters Choice MVP
- 2006 USL 2 Champion, USL 2 MVP Finalist, USL All League First Team, Richmond Kickers Supporters Choice MVP, Richmond Kickers Players Choice MVP, USL 2 Championship Game MVP
- 2007 USL 2 MVP Finalist, USL 2 All League First Team, Richmond Kickers Supporters Choice MVP, USL 2 Assist Leader
- 2008 USL 2 MVP, USL 2 All League First team, USL 2 Richmond Kickers Supporters Choice MVP, USL 2 Richmond Kickers Players Choice MVP, USL 2 Assist Leader
- 2009 USL 2 Champion, USL 2 All League First Team, Richmond Kickers Supporters Choice MVP
