= Ross MacKenzie (footballer) =

Scottish footballer

Personal information
- Full name: Ross MacKenzie
- Date of birth: 21 October 1984 (age 42)
- Place of birth: Paisley, Scotland
- Position: Midfielder

Youth career
- St Johnstone
- Dundee United

College career
Years	Team	Apps	(Gls)
2003–2006	Old Dominion Monarchs	81	(14)

Senior career*
Years	Team	Apps	(Gls)
2005	Richmond Kickers Future	12	(1)
2006	Williamsburg Legacy	16	(10)
2007	Wilmington Hammerheads	14	(3)
2008	Carolina RailHawks	1	(0)
2009–2012	Richmond Kickers	33	(1)
Total		76	(15)
- * Club domestic league appearances and goals

Ross MacKenzie (born 21 October 1984) is a Scottish retired footballer.

== Career ==
=== College and amateur ===
MacKenzie moved from his native Scotland to the United States with his family as a teenager, settling in Midlothian, Virginia. He attended Clover Hill High School and played college soccer at Old Dominion University from 2003 to 2006, where he finished his four seasons as team captain, having played eighty-one games and scored fourteen goals.

During his college years MacKenzie also played with Richmond Kickers Future and the Williamsburg Legacy in the USL Premier Development League.

Prior to moving to the United States, he scored a record 67 goals in the Scottish Youth League, and was a member of the youth academies at storied Scottish league clubs St Johnstone and Dundee United.

=== Professional ===
MacKenzie trained with the Virginia Beach Mariners of the USL First Division during the 2007 pre-season, but the team folded before the start of the season, and MacKenzie instead signed with the Wilmington Hammerheads of the USL Second Division. He made his professional debut, and scored his first professional goal, on 24 May 2007, coming on as a substitute in a 2–2 with the Cincinnati Kings

On 16 April 2008 MacKenzie signed with the Carolina RailHawks of the USL First Division, but he ultimately played just one game for the team, and moved to the Richmond Kickers of the USL Second Division for the 2009 season. On 23 February 2010 Richmond announced the re-signing of MacKenzie to a new contract for the 2010 season.

MacKenzie re-signed again with Richmond on 8 April 2011.

=== International ===
MacKenzie has played for the U-16 and U-18 Scotland national teams, but has never been called up at any senior level.

== Honors ==
=== Richmond Kickers ===
- USL Second Division Champions (1): 2009
