= Evan Harding =

American professional soccer player (born 1984)

Personal information
- Full name: Evan Harding
- Date of birth: September 12, 1984 (age 42)
- Place of birth: Langley, British Columbia, Canada
- Height: 5 ft 11 in (1.80 m)
- Position: Midfielder

Youth career
- 2003–2006: Charlotte 49ers

Senior career*
Years	Team	Apps	(Gls)
2005	Southern California Seahorses	13	(1)
2007–2011	Richmond Kickers	56	(1)
2013	Charlotte Eagles	10	(0)
Total		79	(2)
- * Club domestic league appearances and goals

Evan Harding (born September 12, 1984) is an American former professional soccer player.

== Career ==
=== Youth and college ===
Harding attended East Mecklenburg High School, where he was named NCSCA All-State as a senior, and played college soccer at the University of North Carolina at Charlotte. Harding started 73 of 75 games played over four seasons at UNC Charlotte, scoring 11 goals and registering seven assists during his collegiate career. He earned NCCSIA All-State honors, NSCAA All-Mid-Atlantic region honors and All-Atlantic 10 honors in his senior year.

During his college years Harding also played in the USL Premier Development League for the Southern California Seahorses.

=== Professional ===
Harding turned professional in 2007 when he signed with the Richmond Kickers of the USL Second Division. He made his professional debut on April 21, 2007, as a substitute in Richmond's 2-0 opening day victory over the Cincinnati Kings. He was part of the Richmond team which won the USL Pro Second Division championship in 2009.

Harding signed a new contract with Richmond on March 23, 2011.

== Honors ==
=== Richmond Kickers ===
- USL Pro Champions (1): 2009
