= Luke Vercollone =

American soccer player (born 1982)

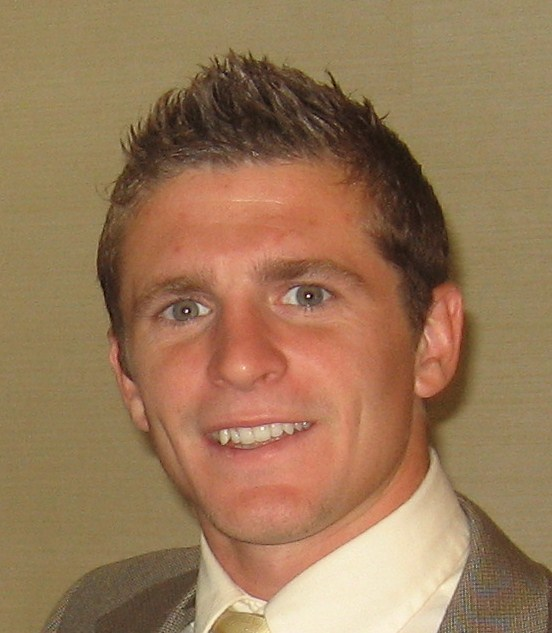

Personal information
- Date of birth: April 4, 1982 (age 44)
- Place of birth: Norwalk, Connecticut, United States
- Height: 5 ft 10 in (1.78 m)
- Position: Midfielder

College career
Years	Team	Apps	(Gls)
2000–2003	Seton Hall Pirates		

Senior career*
Years	Team	Apps	(Gls)
2002–2003	Cape Cod Crusaders	23	(9)
2004–2005	New England Revolution	5	(0)
2006–2007	Charleston Battery	66	(3)
2008–2014	Richmond Kickers	157	(14)
2015–2018	Colorado Springs Switchbacks	104	(28)
- * Club domestic league appearances and goals

Luke Vercollone (born April 4, 1982) is an American former professional soccer player who played as a midfielder for Colorado Springs Switchbacks in the United Soccer League.

== Career ==
=== Youth and college ===
Born in Norwalk, Connecticut, Vercollone grew up in Pembroke, Massachusetts and attended Silver Lake Regional High School where he was a letterman in soccer and wrestling, and won All-Conference honors and All-State honors. He played college soccer for Seton Hall, where he was named to the All-Big East first team his senior season, finishing his career at with 11 goals and 24 assists.

Vercollone also played for the Cape Cod Crusaders of the USL Premier Development League, helping the team to consecutive PDL Championship titles in 2002 and 2003.

=== Professional ===
Vercollone was drafted 42nd overall in the 2004 MLS SuperDraft by the Columbus Crew, but was not offered a contract by the team. Instead, he was picked up by New England Revolution and signed to a developmental contract, but saw practically no time on the field his rookie season, playing a total of 2 minutes in two games. The Revolution released him to waivers following the 2005 season in which he played a total of 35 minutes in 3 games.

On April 10, 2006, Vercollone joined the Charleston Battery for the 2006 USL First Division season. In two seasons with the Battery, he made 66 appearances, scoring three goals and six assists for 12 points overall. In January 2008 Vercollone signed for the Richmond Kickers of the USL Second Division, and was part of the Kickers team which won the 2009 USL Second Division championship. On January 14, 2010, Richmond announced the re-signing of Vercollone for the 2010 season.

Vercollone re-signed for a fourth season with Richmond on November 10, 2010. The club signed him for the 2012 season on September 22, 2011.

=== Colorado Springs Switchbacks ===
On October 19, 2014, it was announced that Vercollone was the first ever signing for new United Soccer League club Colorado Springs Switchbacks. Vercollone was also announced as the team's first captain.

Vercollone ended his first season with the Colorado Springs Switchbacks with 14 goals and 9 assists.

On October 26, 2015, it was announced that Vercollone was in the United Soccer League All-League Team.

On December 4, 2015, it was announced that Vercollone would return to United Soccer League club Colorado Springs Switchbacks for the 2016 United Soccer League season. On March 6, 2016, Vercollone scored 2 goals in a 3–1 victory against Colorado State-Pueblo University in a preseason game. On March 12, 2016, Vercollone scored in a 3–2 preseason victory against UCCS. On March 15, 2016, Vercollone scored in a 4–0 preseason win against Ventura County Fusion.

On October 15, 2018, following the conclusion of his fourth season with the Colorado Springs Switchbacks, Vercollone announced his retirement from professional soccer in an exclusive interview with Last Word on Soccer's Mark Turner. Vercollone concluded his career in Colorado Springs being the first player to represent the club more than 100 times, and leading all-time assists and goal scoring (28 goals, all competitions).

== Honors ==
Cape Cod Crusaders

- USL Premier Development League: 2003

Richmond Kickers

- USL Second Division: 2009

Colorado Springs Switchbacks

- United Soccer League First Team All-League: 2015
