= Henry Kalungi =

Ugandan footballer (born 1987)

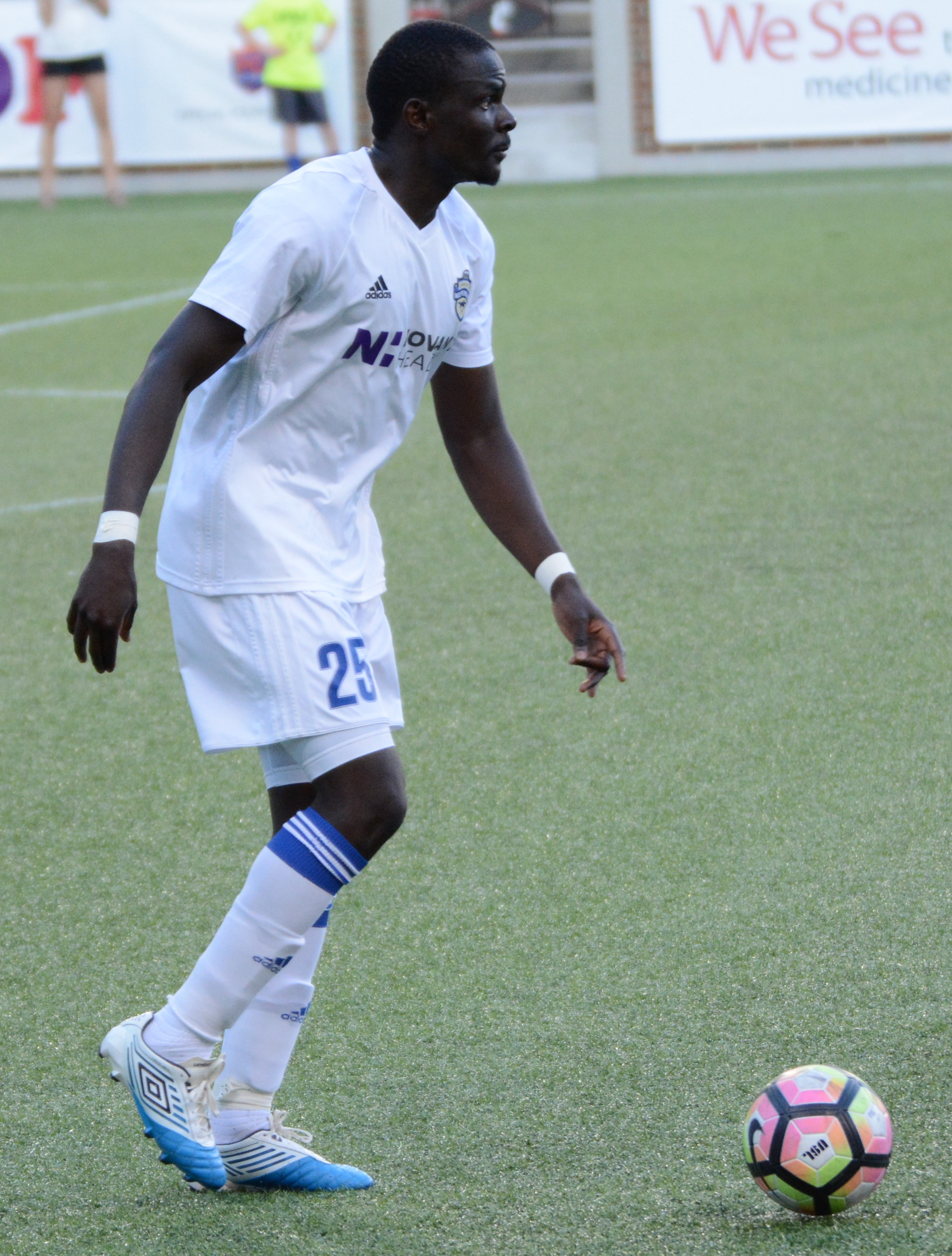
- Kalungi with Charlotte Independence in 2017

Personal information
- Full name: Henry Kalungi
- Date of birth: November 25, 1987 (age 38)
- Place of birth: Kampala, Uganda
- Height: 6 ft 2 in (1.88 m)
- Position: Defender

Youth career
- 2006–2008: Winthrop Eagles

Senior career*
Years	Team	Apps	(Gls)
2007	Hampton Roads Piranhas	13	(2)
2008	Fredericksburg Gunners	14	(0)
2009–2014	Richmond Kickers	113	(0)
2011–2012	→ Proline FC (loan)		
2012	→ Carolina RailHawks (loan)	1	(0)
2013	→ Carolina RailHawks (loan)	4	(1)
2015–2018	Charlotte Independence	80	(0)

International career
2011–2014	Uganda	15	(0)
- * Club domestic league appearances and goals

Henry Kalungi (born 25 November 1987) is a Ugandan former footballer who played as defender.

== Career ==
=== College and amateur ===
Kalungi moved from his native Uganda to the United States in 2006 to attend and play college soccer at Winthrop University. He made 56 appearances for Winthrop in his three years at the college, was named the 2006 team MVP, and received Big South All-Tournament Team and NSCAA/adidas All-South Atlantic Region Team accolades.

Kalungi also played with the Hampton Roads Piranhas and the Fredericksburg Gunners in the USL Premier Development League, being named to the All-Conference First-Team in 2008.

=== Professional ===
Kalungi was drafted in the fourth round (53rd overall) of the 2009 MLS SuperDraft by Colorado Rapids, but was not offered a contract by the team. He later signed with the Richmond Kickers of the USL Second Division, and made his professional debut on April 18, 2009, in Richmond's 2-2 opening day tie with the Harrisburg City Islanders. He remained with Richmond through the 2009, 2010, and 2011 seasons. The club re-signed him for the 2012 season on September 22, 2011.

Kalungi was loaned to Proline FC of the Ugandan Super League on October 3, 2011. He returned to Richmond in February 2012. In 2015 he was signed by Charlotte Independence.

=== International ===
Kalungi has appeared for the Ugandan U-20 national team and the senior national team.

== Honors ==
=== Richmond Kickers ===
- USL Second Division Champions (1): 2009
- USL Pro Commissioner's Cup (1): 2013
