= Sascha Görres =

German footballer

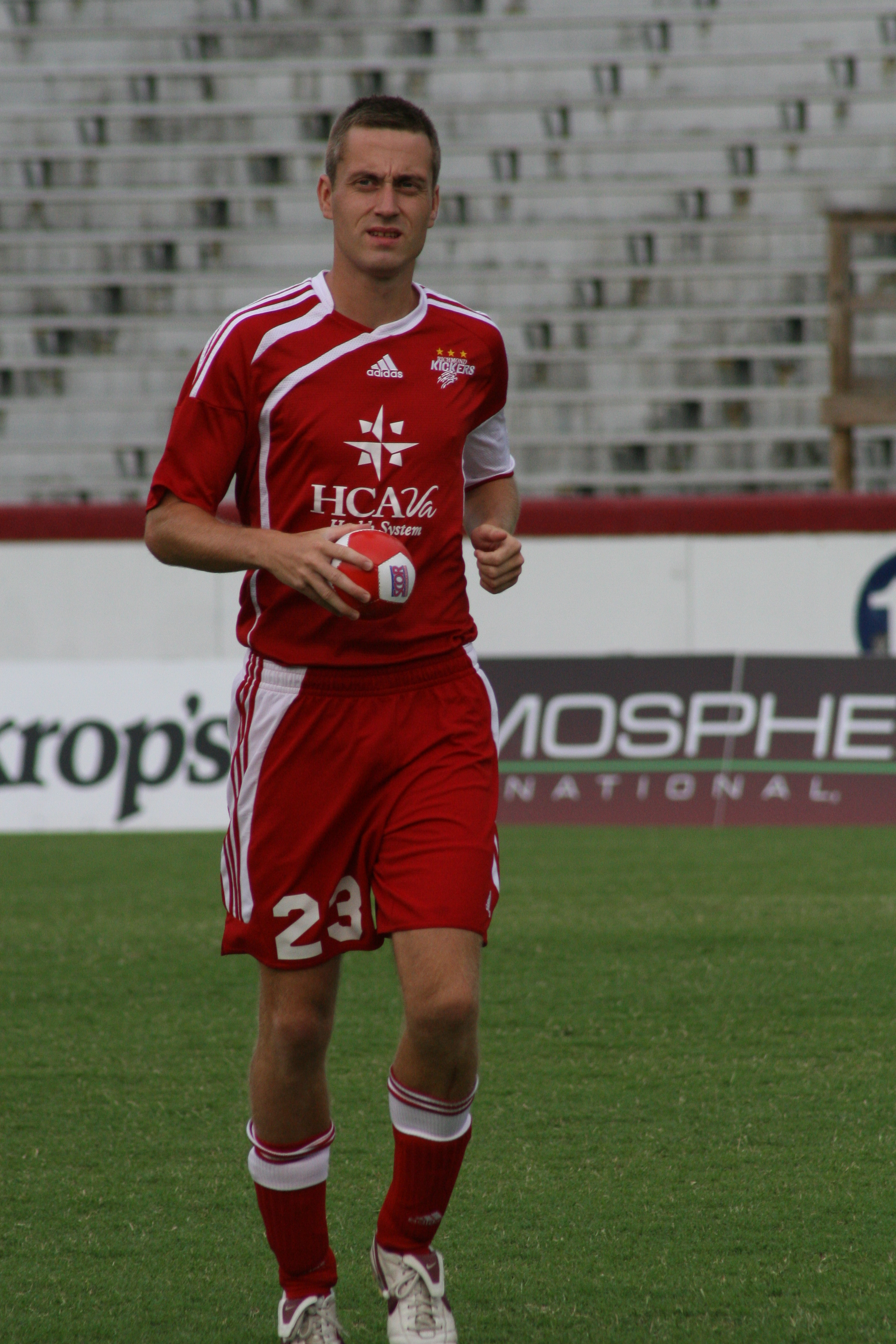
- Görres in 2009

Personal information
- Date of birth: 27 February 1980 (age 46)
- Place of birth: Flensburg, West Germany
- Height: 6 ft 1 in (1.85 m)
- Position: Defender

Youth career
- 1985–1999: ETSV Weiche
- 2003–2004: UNC Pembroke Braves

Senior career*
| Years | Team | Apps | (Gls) |
| 1999–2002 | ETSV Weiche | | |
| 2002–2003 | TSB Flensburg | 32 | (0) |
| 2005–2016 | Richmond Kickers | 236 | (17) |

Managerial career
- 2002–2003: ETSV Weiche C-Youth
- 2007–: Richmond Kickers Academy
- 2015–2018: Richmond Kickers (assistant)
- * Club domestic league appearances and goals

Sascha Görres (born 27 February 1980) is a German former professional footballer who played as a defender.

== Career ==
=== Early career in Germany ===
Born in Flensburg, Görres grew up playing in the youth system of German Verbandsliga Schleswig-Holstein-Nord-West (sixth tier) team ETSV Weiche, eventually graduating to play for the senior side in 1999 at the age of 19. He transferred to TSB Flensburg in 2002, and played 32 games for the team in the fifth-tier Schleswig-Holstein-Liga in 2002–03, while simultaneously studying at the University of Flensburg.

=== College ===
Görres transferred from the University of Flensburg to the University of North Carolina at Pembroke in the United States in 2003 to study applied sciences and play on the college soccer team. He garnered PBC All-Conference, All-Region and All-State honors in his freshman season at Pembroke, and in his second year was an All-Conference, All-Tournament and first team All-American (NCAA Division II) pick, and was named to the NSCAA All-Southeast Region squad and the NSCAA/Adidas Scholar All-American squad.

=== Professional ===
Görres turned professional when he was drafted by the Richmond Kickers of the USL Second Division in the 2005 USL First Division College Draft. He has been ever-present for the Kickers since then; he was a USL2 All-League First Team selection in 2006, earned USL-2 All-League First Team honors and was a USL-2 Defender of the Year Finalist in 2008, and helped the Kickers to two USL Second Division championships in 2006 and 2009.

== Coaching career ==
Görres received his US Soccer A-Youth License in 2017. He served as Assistant Coach of the Richmond Kickers Pro Team from 2014 to 2018. In the past, Görres coached several Richmond Kickers youth teams as well as ETSV Weiche C-Youth to the Flensburg city championship during the 2002–2003 season. He is Academy Director for the Richmond United Boys DA program.

== Honors ==
Richmond Kickers

- USL Second Division: 2006, 2009
