= Richmond Kickers Future =

- Full name: Richmond Kickers Future
- Nickname: The Kickers
- Founded: 2002
- Dissolved: 2009
- Ground: Sports Backers Stadium
- Capacity: 3,250
- Chairman: Tom Depcrynski
- Manager: Kyle Lessig
- League: USL Premier Development League
- 2008: 6th, Mid Atlantic Division
| Home colors | Away colors |

Richmond Kickers Future was an American soccer team based in Richmond, Virginia, United States. Founded in 2002 as part of the development system of the Richmond Kickers USL Second Division franchise, the team played in the USL Premier Development League (PDL), the fourth tier of the American Soccer Pyramid, until 2009, when the franchise folded and the team left the league.

The team played its home games at Sports Backers Stadium. The team's colors were red, white and black.

== Year-by-year ==
| Year | Division | League | Regular season | Playoffs | Open Cup |
|---|---|---|---|---|---|
| 2002 | 4 | USL PDL | 3rd, Mid Atlantic | Did not qualify | Did not qualify |
| 2003 | 4 | USL PDL | 1st, Mid Atlantic | Conference Semifinals | Did not qualify |
| 2004 | 4 | USL PDL | 3rd, Mid Atlantic | Did not qualify | Did not qualify |
| 2005 | 4 | USL PDL | 1st, Mid Atlantic | National Semifinals | 2nd Round |
| 2006 | 4 | USL PDL | 5th, Mid Atlantic | Did not qualify | Did not qualify |
| 2007 | 4 | USL PDL | 6th, Mid Atlantic | Did not qualify | Did not qualify |
| 2008 | 4 | USL PDL | 6th, Mid Atlantic | Did not qualify | Did not qualify |

== Honors ==
- USL PDL Eastern Conference Champions 2005
- USL PDL Mid Atlantic Division Champions 2005
- USL PDL Mid Atlantic Division Champions 2003

=== James River Cup ===
The James River Cup was an annual competition held between the Richmond Kickers and the Virginia Beach Mariners (formerly Hampton Roads Mariners) in which the team with the most points at the conclusion of all scheduled matches between the two teams. The Cup was held every year since 1996 with the exception of 1997 and 2001 when Virginia Beach did not field a team. In 2007, the Virginia Beach team was disbanded.

For the 2008 season, the James River Cup was contested between the Richmond Kickers organization and the Hampton Roads Piranhas organization. The cup went to the organization that had the most points in games between their PDL and W-League teams. The series ended up tied 2-2-1, with the Piranhas winning the Cup on goal difference.

Winners

- 2008: Hampton Roads Piranhas
- 2007: Not Held
- 2006: Virginia Beach Mariners
- 2005: Richmond Kickers
- 2004: Richmond Kickers
- 2003: Richmond Kickers
- 2002: Richmond Kickers
- 2001: Not Held
- 2000: Richmond Kickers
- 1999: Richmond Kickers
- 1998: Richmond Kickers
- 1997: Not Held
- 1996: Hampton Roads Mariners

== Head coaches ==
- (England) Martin Dell (2005–2006)
- (Ukraine) Ihor Dotsenko (2007)
- (United States) Kyle Lessig (2008)

== Stadia ==
- University of Richmond Stadium; Richmond, Virginia (2003–2008)
- Cary Street Field; Richmond, Virginia (2004)
- Sports Backers Stadium; Richmond, Virginia (2005–2008)

== Average attendance ==
Attendance stats are calculated by averaging each team's self-reported home attendances from the historical match archive at https://web.archive.org/web/20100105175057/http://www.uslsoccer.com/history/index_E.html and from Kenn.com https://kenn.com/blog/soccer/all-time-usl-league-two-attendance/.

- 2002: 136 (35th in PDL)
- 2003: 88 (47th in PDL)
- 2004: 129 (48th in PDL)
- 2005: 124 (45th in PDL)
- 2006: 151 (50th in PDL)
- 2007: 154 (56th in PDL)
- 2008: 720 (14th in PDL)
