= 2009 Portland Timbers season =

Portland Timbers
2009 season
- President: Merritt Paulson
- Head coach: Gavin Wilkinson
- USL-1: League: 1st (Commissioner's Cup); Playoffs: Semifinals
- U.S. Open Cup: Third round
- Cascadia Cup: 1st
- Top goalscorer: League: Mandjou Keita (11 goals); All: Mandjou Keita (14 goals)
- Highest home attendance: League: 14,103 vs. Puerto Rico (July 23); All: 16,382 vs. Seattle (July 1)
- Lowest home attendance: 6,427 vs. Montreal (June 4)
- Average home league attendance: League: 9,734; All: 10,392
Primary colors	Secondary colors	Third colors

The 2009 Portland Timbers season was the ninth season for the club in the United Soccer Leagues First Division (USL-1), the second tier of the United States soccer pyramid. The first competitive game of the 2009 season was played on April 25 at Swangard Stadium in Burnaby, BC versus Vancouver Whitecaps FC which the Timbers lost 1–0. Following that loss the Timbers went on a 24-game unbeaten streak in the league on their way to securing the Commissioner's Cup for finishing the regular season atop the table. In a hard-fought, two-legged series, Vancouver Whitecaps FC knocked Portland out of the playoffs in the semifinals by an aggregate score of 5–4. In the U.S. Open Cup the Timbers hosted Seattle Sounders FC of Major League Soccer in the third round but were eliminated by their bitter rivals 2–1 in front of 16,382 spectators at PGE Park in Portland, Oregon.

== Preseason ==
2009-03-14	San Jose Earthquakes (MLS)	1–0	Portland Timbers	Santa Clara, California
19:00 PST	Amarikwa 78'	Report		Stadium: Buck Shaw Stadium; Attendance: 3,348

2009-03-20	Portland Timbers	0–0	New York Red Bulls (MLS)	Portland, Oregon
19:00 PDT		Report		Stadium: Merlo Field; Attendance: 2,235

2009-03-27	Portland Pilots (NCAA)	0–0	Portland Timbers	Portland, Oregon
19:00 PDT		Report		Stadium: Merlo Field

2009-04-03	Vancouver Whitecaps FC	1–1	Portland Timbers	Burnaby, British Columbia
	Charles 68'	Report	82' Claesson	Stadium: Burnaby Lake Sports Complex

2009-04-08	Oregon State Beavers (NCAA)	0–1	Portland Timbers	Corvallis, Oregon
19:00 PDT		Report	75' Suzuki

2009-04-13	Seattle Sounders FC Reserves	2–3	Portland Timbers	Tukwila, Washington
	Forrest; Allen	Report	Savage; McManus; Keita	Stadium: Starfire Sports Complex

2009-04-18	Portland Timbers	1–1	Tacoma Tide (PDL)	Forest Grove, Oregon
	Keel 68'	Report	87'	Stadium: Lincoln Park Stadium

== Regular season ==
=== April ===
2009-04-25 USL-1 / CC	Vancouver Whitecaps FC	1–0	Portland Timbers	Burnaby, British Columbia
19:00 PDT	Nash 63'	Report		Stadium: Swangard Stadium; Attendance: 5,102; Referee: Mathieu Bourdeau

2009-04-30 USL-1	Portland Timbers	0–0	Carolina RailHawks FC	Portland, Oregon
19:00 PDT		Report		Stadium: PGE Park; Attendance: 8,549; Referee: Ben Chuoaf

=== May ===
2009-05-02 USL-1	Portland Timbers	2–0	Carolina RailHawks FC	Portland, Oregon
19:00 PDT	Farber 5'; Pore 83'	Report		Stadium: PGE Park; Attendance: 6,742; Referee: Alejandro Mariscal

2009-05-09 USL-1	Cleveland City Stars	0–0	Portland Timbers	Bedford, Ohio
16:00 PDT		Report		Stadium: Middlefield Cheese Stadium; Attendance: 1,107; Referee: Lee Suckle

2009-05-14 USL-1	Portland Timbers	2–1	Rochester Rhinos	Portland, Oregon
20:00 PDT	Farber 40'; Pore 90' (pen.)	Report	(red card) 61' Short; 66' Kenton	Stadium: PGE Park; Attendance: 7,556; Referee: Landis Wiley

2009-05-22 USL-1	Puerto Rico Islanders	1–1	Portland Timbers	Bayamón, Puerto Rico
17:00 PDT	Fraser 52'	Report	59' Keita	Stadium: Juan Ramón Loubriel Stadium; Attendance: 3,011; Referee: Lee Suckle

2009-05-24 USL-1	Puerto Rico Islanders	1–2	Portland Timbers	Bayamón, Puerto Rico
16:00 PDT	Krause 34'	Report	24' Keita; 35' Danso	Stadium: Juan Ramón Loubriel Stadium; Attendance: 2,701; Referee: Jeff Gontarek

2009-05-30 USL-1 / CC	Portland Timbers	2–0	Vancouver Whitecaps FC	Portland, Oregon
19:00 PDT	Pore 6' (pen.); Josten 41'	Report		Stadium: PGE Park; Attendance: 9,081; Referee: Hidajet Tica

2009-05-31 Friendly	Portland Timbers	4–1	América reserves	Portland, Oregon
17:00 PDT	Danso 2'; Suzuki 77'; Pore 84'; McLaughlin 88'	Report	34' Garcia	Stadium: PGE Park; Attendance: 5,017

=== June ===
2009-06-04 USL-1	Portland Timbers	1–0	Montreal Impact	Portland, Oregon
19:00 PDT	Savage 90'	Report		Stadium: PGE Park; Attendance: 6,427; Referee: Matthew Foerster

2009-06-09 USOC 1st Rd	Kitsap Pumas (PDL)	0–3	Portland Timbers	Bremerton, Washington
19:00 PDT		Report	46' Farber; 90' McLaughlin; 90' (pen.) Hayes	Stadium: Bremerton Memorial Stadium; Referee: Josh Wilkens

2009-06-11 USL-1	Carolina RailHawks FC	0–0	Portland Timbers	Cary, North Carolina
16:00 PDT	Cunliffe (red card) 50'	Report		Stadium: WakeMed Soccer Park; Attendance: 1,473

2009-06-13 USL-1	Charleston Battery	1–1	Portland Timbers	Charleston, South Carolina
16:30 PDT	Patterson 64'	Report	84' Keita	Stadium: Blackbaud Stadium; Attendance: 3,076; Referee: Niko Bratsis

2009-06-16 USOC 2nd Rd	Sonoma County Sol (NPSL)	0–3	Portland Timbers	Santa Rosa, California
19:00 PDT		Report	7' Josten; 87', 90' Keita	Stadium: Ernie Nevers Field

2009-06-19 USL-1	Portland Timbers	5–1	Minnesota Thunder	Portland, Oregon
20:00 PDT	Josten 4'; Suzuki 32'; Hayes 64' (pen.); Keita 88'; Thompson 90'	Report	38' Sánchez; (red card) 62' James; (red card) 86' Arango; (red card) 90' Tarley	Stadium: PGE Park; Attendance: 8,111; Referee: Maurizo Laudani

2009-06-28 USL-1	Portland Timbers	4–0	Montreal Impact	Portland, Oregon
17:00 PDT	Keita 9', 47'; Farber 56'; Gatti 64' (o.g.)	Report		Stadium: PGE Park; Attendance: 7,783; Referee: Elias Bazakos

=== July ===
2009-07-01 USOC 3rd Rd	Portland Timbers	1–2	Seattle Sounders FC (MLS)	Portland, Oregon
19:00 PDT	Keita 43'	Report	1' Levesque; 26' King	Stadium: PGE Park; Attendance: 16,382 (SO); Referee: Yeder Reyes

2009-07-02 Friendly	Portland Timbers reserves	2–0	Bayern Munich II	Portland, Oregon
19:00 PDT	Forrest 8'; Jallow 55'	Report		Stadium: PGE Park; Attendance: 9,340

2009-07-04 USL-1	Minnesota Thunder	1–1	Portland Timbers	Blaine, Minnesota
17:05 PDT	Bass 90'	Report	63' McManus	Stadium: National Sports Center; Attendance: 3,647; Referee: Tony Russo

2009-07-11 USL-1	Austin Aztex FC	1–2	Portland Timbers	Austin, Texas
17:30 PDT	Noel-Williams 90'	Report	14' Keita; 90' Claesson	Stadium: Nelson Field; Attendance: 3,114; Referee: Colin Tait

2009-07-17 USL-1	Miami FC	1–1	Portland Timbers	Miami, Florida
17:00 PDT	Bueso 25'	Report	78' Hayes	Stadium: FIU Stadium; Attendance: 605; Referee: Landis Wiley

2009-07-19 USL-1	Miami FC	0–3	Portland Timbers	Miami, Florida
15:00 PDT		Report	50' Josten; 56' Savage; 77' Jallow	Stadium: FIU Stadium; Attendance: 348; Referee: Daniel Fitzgerald

2009-07-23 USL-1	Portland Timbers	0–0	Puerto Rico Islanders	Portland, Oregon
19:00 PDT		Report		Stadium: PGE Park; Attendance: 14,103; Referee: Andres Pfefferkorn

2009-07-25 Friendly	Portland Timbers	2–2 (a.e.t.) (2–4 p)	Burnley	Portland, Oregon
19:00 PDT	Josten 11'; López 82'	Report	40' Caldwell; 67' Thompson	Stadium: PGE Park; Attendance: 9,078
	Penalties
	Forrest (penalty missed); Cronin (penalty scored); Danso (penalty scored); Nimo (penalty missed)		(penalty missed) Caldwell; (penalty scored) Eagles; (penalty scored) Guðjónsson; (penalty scored) McDonald; (penalty scored) Elliott

=== August ===
2009-08-01 USL-1	Minnesota Thunder	1–1	Portland Timbers	Blaine, Minnesota
17:05 PDT	Sánchez 90' (pen.)	Report	55' Hayes; (red card) 83' McLaughlin	Stadium: National Sports Center; Attendance: 3,991; Referee: Joe Caraccio

2009-08-06 USL-1 / CC	Portland Timbers	1–0	Vancouver Whitecaps FC	Portland, Oregon
19:00 PDT	Pore 30'	Report		Stadium: PGE Park; Attendance: 10,786; Referee: Landis Wiley

2009-08-08 USL-1	Portland Timbers	3–1	Charleston Battery	Portland, Oregon
19:00 PDT	Keita 12'; Nimo 41'; Pore 81'	Report	50' Armstrong; (red card) 85' Williams	Stadium: PGE Park; Attendance: 9,477; Referee: Andres Pfefferkorn

2009-08-12 USL-1	Montreal Impact	0–1	Portland Timbers	Montreal
16:45 PDT		Report	83' Pore	Stadium: Saputo Stadium; Attendance: 11,247; Referee: John Oliva

2009-08-15 USL-1	Rochester Rhinos	1–4	Portland Timbers	Rochester, New York
16:35 PDT	Menyongar (red card) 75'; Ukah 86'	Report	22' Suzuki; 74' Pore; 80' Savage; 90' Keita	Stadium: Marina Auto Stadium; Attendance: 6,071; Referee: Nick Bratsis

2009-08-22 USL-1	Portland Timbers	3–1	Miami FC	Portland, Oregon
19:00 PDT	Keita 45', 81'; Pore 90'	Report	(red card) 66' Ramírez; 77' Merritt	Stadium: PGE Park; Attendance: 13,845; Referee: Jeremy Vehar

2009-08-28 USL-1	Charleston Battery	0–0	Portland Timbers	Charleston, South Carolina
17:00 PDT	Fuller (red card) 26'	Report		Stadium: Blackbaud Stadium; Attendance: 2,810; Referee: Andrew Chapin

=== September ===
2009-09-03 USL-1	Portland Timbers	1–2	Rochester Rhinos	Portland, Oregon
19:00 PDT	Pore 81'	Report	52', 90' McFarlane	Stadium: PGE Park; Attendance: 11,683; Referee: Fotis Bazakos

2009-09-07 USL-1	Austin Aztex FC	0–1	Portland Timbers	Austin, Texas
16:00 PDT		Report	85' Keel	Stadium: Nelson Field; Attendance: 2,439; Referee: Alejandro Mariscal

2009-09-11 USL-1	Portland Timbers	1–2	Austin Aztex FC	Portland, Oregon
19:00 PDT	Horst 29' (o.g.)	Report	66' McMahen; 82' Adams	Stadium: PGE Park; Attendance: 10,141; Referee: Daniel Radford

2009-09-13 USL-1	Portland Timbers	0–1	Cleveland City Stars	Portland, Oregon
17:00 PDT		Report	24' Hotchkin; (red card) 90' Peters	Stadium: PGE Park; Attendance: 9,157; Referee: Tyler Ploeger

2009-09-17 USL-1	Portland Timbers	2–1	Cleveland City Stars	Portland, Oregon
19:00 PDT	Josten 6', 55'	Report	63' Stewart	Stadium: PGE Park; Attendance: 12,567; Referee: Vicente Cortes

== Postseason ==
2009-09-23 Friendly	Portland Timbers	0–1	Kitsap Pumas (PDL)	Portland, Oregon
		Report	12' Megson	Stadium: PGE Park

2009-10-01 Semifinals	Vancouver Whitecaps FC	2–1	Portland Timbers	Burnaby, British Columbia
19:30 PDT	Gbeke 25'; Haber 49'	Report	44' (pen.) Pore	Stadium: Swangard Stadium; Attendance: 4,516; Referee: Geoff Gamble

2009-10-04 Semifinals	Portland Timbers	3–3	Vancouver Whitecaps FC	Portland, Oregon
16:00 PDT	Farber 10', 43'; Nimo 83'	Report	4' Haber; 60' Nash; 71' James	Stadium: PGE Park; Attendance: 14,283; Referee: Gilario Grajeda

== Competitions ==
=== USL First Division ===
==== League standings ====
Commissioner's Cup, bye to semifinal round of playoffs
Quarterfinal round of playoffs

Pos	Club	Pts	Pld	W	L	T	GF	GA	GD	H2H Pts
1	Portland Timbers	58	30	16	4	10	45	19	+26	
2	Carolina RailHawks	55	30	16	7	7	43	19	+24	
3	Puerto Rico Islanders	53	30	15	7	8	44	31	+13	PRI: 6 pts CHA: 3 pts
4	Charleston Battery	53	30	14	6	10	33	21	+12	PRI: 6 pts CHA: 3 pts
5	Montreal Impact	44	30	12	10	8	32	31	+1	
6	Rochester Rhinos	43	30	11	9	10	34	32	+2	
7	Vancouver Whitecaps	42	30	11	10	9	42	36	+6	
8	Minnesota Thunder	31	30	7	13	10	39	44	−5	
9	Miami FC	29	30	8	17	5	26	52	−26	
10	Austin Aztex	21^{†}	30	5	17	8	28	51	−23	
11	Cleveland City Stars	19	30	4	19	7	22	52	−30	

^{†} Austin deducted two points for fielding an ineligible player on July 25, 2009

==== Results summary ====
Overall								Home						Away					
Pld	Pts	W	L	T	GF	GA	GD	W	L	T	GF	GA	GD	W	L	T	GF	GA	GD
30	58	16	4	10	45	19	+26	10	3	2	27	10	+17	6	1	8	18	9	+9

Last updated: April 26, 2010
Source: uslsoccer.com
Pld = Matches played; Pts = Points; W = Matches won; T = Matches tied; L = Matches lost; GF = Goals for; GA = Goals against; GD = Goal difference

==== Results by round ====
Round	1	2	3	4	5	6	7	8	9	10	11	12	13	14	15	16	17	18	19	20	21	22	23	24	25	26	27	28	29	30
Stadium	A	H	H	A	H	A	A	H	H	A	A	H	H	A	A	A	A	H	A	H	H	A	A	H	A	H	A	H	H	H
Result	L	T	W	T	W	T	W	W	W	T	T	W	W	T	W	T	W	T	T	W	W	W	W	W	T	L	W	L	L	W
Position	10	9	5	7	4	5	4	3	3	3	3	2	1	1	1	1	1	1	1	1	1	1	1	1	1	1	1	1	1	1

Source: USL-1 Results
A = Away; H = Home; W = Win; L = Loss; T = Tie

=== USL-1 Playoffs ===
==== Playoff bracket ====
Teams were re-seeded for semifinal matchups

Quarterfinals
2	Carolina RailHawks FC	0	0	0
7	Vancouver Whitecaps FC	1	0	1
3	Puerto Rico Islanders	1	4	5
6	Rochester Rhinos	2	1	3
4	Charleston Battery	0	1	1
5	Montreal Impact	2	2	4

Semifinals
1	Portland Timbers	1	3	4
7	Vancouver Whitecaps FC	2	3	5
3	Puerto Rico Islanders	1	1	2
5	Montreal Impact	2	2	4

Final
5	Montreal Impact	3	3	6
7	Vancouver Whitecaps FC	2	1	3

==== Semifinals ====
2009-10-01
19:30 PDT
Leg 1

Vancouver Whitecaps FC	2–1	Portland Timbers
Gbeke 25'; Haber 49'	Report	44' (pen.) Pore

Swangard Stadium
Attendance: 4,516
Referee: Geoff Gamble

2009-10-04
16:00 PDT
Leg 2

Portland Timbers	3–3	Vancouver Whitecaps FC
Farber 10', 43'; Nimo 83'	Report	4' Haber; 60' Nash; 71' James

PGE Park
Attendance: 14,283
Referee: Gilario Grajeda

=== U.S. Open Cup ===
==== Cup bracket ====
Second Round winners advance to play one of 8 MLS clubs in 16-team knockout tournament
Home teams listed on top of bracket

First round
PDL	Orange County Blue Star	2
NPSL	Sonoma County Sol	5
PDL	Kitsap Pumas	0
USL-1	Portland Timbers	3

Second round
NPSL	Sonoma County Sol	0
USL-1	Portland Timbers	3

Third round
USL-1	Portland Timbers	1
MLS	Seattle Sounders FC	2

==== First round ====
2009-06-09
19:00 PDT

Kitsap Pumas (PDL)	0–3	Portland Timbers
	Report	46' Farber; 90' McLaughlin; 90' (pen.) Hayes

Bremerton Memorial Stadium
Referee: Josh Wilkens

==== Second round ====
2009-06-16
19:00 PDT

Sonoma County Sol (NPSL)	0–3	Portland Timbers
	Report	7' Josten; 87', 90' Keita

Ernie Nevers Field

==== Third round ====
2009-07-01
19:00 PDT

Portland Timbers	1–2	Seattle Sounders FC (MLS)
Keita 43'	Report	1' Levesque; 26' King

PGE Park
Attendance: 16,382 (SO)
Referee: Yeder Reyes

=== Cascadia Cup ===
2009
Team	Pts	Pld	W	L	T	GF	GA	GD
Portland Timbers	6	3	2	1	0	3	1	+2
Vancouver Whitecaps	3	3	1	2	0	1	3	-2

== Club ==
=== Coaching staff ===
Position	Staff
Head coach	(New Zealand) Gavin Wilkinson
Assistant coach	(United States) Amos Magee
Assistant coach	(United States) Jim Rilatt
Goalkeeper coach	(United States) Jim Brazeau

Updated to match played May 24, 2011

=== Management ===
Majority Owner & President	(United States) Merritt Paulson
General Manager	(New Zealand) Gavin Wilkinson
Ground (capacity and dimensions)	PGE Park (15,418 / )

Updated to match played May 24, 2011

=== Staff recognition ===
USL-1 Coach of the Year

Coach	W	L	T	League	Playoffs
(New Zealand) Gavin Wilkinson	16	4	10	1st	Semifinals

USL-1 Executive of the Year

Executive	Avg. Att.	Club honors
(United States) Merritt Paulson	9,734	Commissioner's Cup

== Squad ==
=== Kits ===
Primary	Secondary	Third

=== Final roster ===
Note: Flags indicate national team as defined under FIFA eligibility rules; some limited exceptions apply. Players may hold more than one non-FIFA nationality.

No.	Pos.	Nation	Player
0	GK	USA	Steve Cronin
2	DF	MEX	Ivan Becerra
4	MF	USA	Brian Farber
5	DF	USA	David Hayes (captain)
6	DF	NZL	Cameron Knowles
7	MF	USA	Shaun Higgins
8	MF	USA	Tom Poltl
9	FW	SWE	Antouman Jallow
10	FW	GUI	Mandjou Keita
11	MF	SWE	Johan Claesson
12	MF	USA	Tony McManus
13	MF	USA	Josh Cameron
14	MF	USA	Jason McLaughlin
15	FW	USA	Kevin Forrest

No.	Pos.	Nation	Player
16	DF	USA	Stephen Keel
17	DF	USA	Scot Thompson
18	MF	USA	Alex Nimo (on loan from Real Salt Lake)
19	FW	USA	George Josten
20	DF	JPN	Takuro Nishimura
21	DF	USA	Cameron Dunn
22	MF	USA	Keith Savage
23	MF	USA	Ryan Pore
24	GK	USA	Brian Visser
28	MF	USA	Rodrigo López
30	FW	JPN	Takayuki Suzuki
98	DF	GAM	Mamadou Danso

=== Player recognition ===
USL-1 Scoring Champion

Player	G	A	Pts
(Guinea) Mandjou Keita	11	7	29

USL-1 All-League First Team

Pos	Player	GP
GK	(United States) Steve Cronin	28
DF	(United States) David Hayes	30
MF	(United States) Ryan Pore	23
FW	(Guinea) Mandjou Keita	29

USL-1 All-League Second Team

Pos	Player	GP
DF	(New Zealand) Cameron Knowles	20

USL-1 Player of the Week

Week	Player	Opponent(s)	Ref
7	(Guinea) Mandjou Keita	Puerto Rico Islanders (x2)	
12	(Guinea) Mandjou Keita	Montreal Impact	
15	(United States) David Hayes	Miami FC (x2)	
18	(Guinea) Mandjou Keita	Vancouver Whitecaps, Charleston Battery	
24	(United States) George Josten	Cleveland City Stars (x2)	

USL-1 Team of the Week

Week	Player	Opponent(s)	Ref
4	(United States) Brian Farber	Carolina RailHawks (x2)	
4	(United States) Ryan Pore	Carolina RailHawks (x2)	
4	(United States) Chris Seitz	Carolina RailHawks (x2)	
5	(New Zealand) Cameron Knowles	Cleveland City Stars	
6	(United States) Brian Farber	Rochester Rhinos	
7	(Guinea) Mandjou Keita	Puerto Rico Islanders (x2)	
8	(United States) Steve Cronin	Vancouver Whitecaps	
8	(United States) George Josten	Vancouver Whitecaps	
8	(United States) Scot Thompson	Vancouver Whitecaps	
9	(New Zealand) Cameron Knowles	Montreal Impact	
10	(United States) David Hayes	Carolina RailHawks, Charleston Battery	
11	(United States) David Hayes	Minnesota Thunder	
11	(United States) George Josten	Minnesota Thunder	
12	(United States) George Josten	Montreal Impact	
12	(Guinea) Mandjou Keita	Montreal Impact	
13	(United States) Tony McManus	Minnesota Thunder	
14	(Sweden) Johan Claesson	Austin Aztex	
15	(United States) David Hayes	Miami FC (x2)	
15	(United States) Tony McManus	Miami FC (x2)	
15	(United States) Keith Savage	Miami FC (x2)	
16	(United States) Stephen Keel	Puerto Rico Islanders	
17	(United States) Ryan Pore	Minnesota Thunder	
18	(Guinea) Mandjou Keita	Vancouver Whitecaps, Charleston Battery	
18	(New Zealand) Cameron Knowles	Vancouver Whitecaps, Charleston Battery	
18	(United States) Alex Nimo	Vancouver Whitecaps, Charleston Battery	
19	(United States) David Hayes	Montreal Impact, Rochester Rhinos	
19	(Guinea) Mandjou Keita	Montreal Impact, Rochester Rhinos	
19	(United States) Ryan Pore	Montreal Impact, Rochester Rhinos	
20	(Guinea) Mandjou Keita	Miami FC	
21	(United States) Steve Cronin	Charleston Battery	
21	(United States) Stephen Keel	Charleston Battery	
22	(United States) Stephen Keel	Rochester Rhinos, Austin Aztex	
24	(United States) George Josten	Cleveland City Stars (x2)	

=== Statistics ===
==== Appearances and goals ====
All players contracted to the club during the season included.

No.	Pos	Nat	Player	Total		USL-1		Playoffs		U.S. Open Cup	
No.	Pos	Nat	Player	Apps	Goals	Apps	Goals	Apps	Goals	Apps	Goals
0	GK	(United States) USA	Steve Cronin	33	0	28+0	0	2+0	0	3+0	0
(1)	GK	(United States) USA	Chris Seitz (3 day loan from (United States) Real Salt Lake)	2	0	2+0	0	0+0	0	0+0	0
2	DF	(Mexico) MEX	Ivan Becerra	1	0	0+1	0	0+0	0	0+0	0
4	MF	(United States) USA	Brian Farber	34	6	23+6	3	2+0	2	3+0	1
5	DF	(United States) USA	David Hayes (captain)	35	3	30+0	2	2+0	0	3+0	1
6	DF	(New Zealand) NZL	Cameron Knowles	22	0	20+0	0	0+0	0	2+0	0
7	MF	(United States) USA	Shaun Higgins	5	0	0+5	0	0+0	0	0+0	0
8	MF	(United States) USA	Tom Poltl	6	0	0+4	0	0+0	0	0+2	0
(9)	FW	(Sweden) SWE	Antouman Jallow (loaned to (Sweden) Sandviken)	2	1	0+2	1	0+0	0	0+0	0
10	FW	(Guinea) GUI	Mandjou Keita	34	14	28+1	11	2+0	0	3+0	3
11	MF	(Sweden) SWE	Johan Claesson	27	1	22+1	1	2+0	0	2+0	0
12	MF	(United States) USA	Tony McManus	28	1	24+0	1	2+0	0	1+1	0
13	MF	(United States) USA	Josh Cameron	5	0	0+4	0	0+0	0	0+1	0
14	MF	(United States) USA	Jason McLaughlin	24	1	4+17	0	0+1	0	1+1	1
15	FW	(United States) USA	Kevin Forrest	10	0	0+10	0	0+0	0	0+0	0
16	DF	(United States) USA	Stephen Keel	34	1	27+2	1	2+0	0	3+0	0
17	DF	(United States) USA	Scot Thompson	34	1	24+5	1	2+0	0	3+0	0
18	MF	(United States) USA	Alex Nimo	26	2	6+17	1	0+1	1	2+0	0
19	FW	(United States) USA	George Josten	30	6	20+5	5	2+0	0	2+1	1
20	DF	(Japan) JPN	Takuro Nishimura	15	0	7+6	0	1+1	0	0+0	0
21	DF	(United States) USA	Cameron Dunn	1	0	0+1	0	0+0	0	0+0	0
22	MF	(United States) USA	Keith Savage	35	3	17+13	3	0+2	0	3+0	0
23	MF	(United States) USA	Ryan Pore	25	11	21+2	10	2+0	1	0+0	0
24	GK	(United States) USA	Brian Visser	1	0	0+1	0	0+0	0	0+0	0
28	MF	(United States) USA	Rodrigo López	5	0	0+4	0	0+1	0	0+0	0
30	FW	(Japan) JPN	Takayuki Suzuki	32	2	14+13	2	0+2	0	2+1	0
98	DF	(The Gambia) GAM	Mamadou Danso	19	1	12+4	1	1+0	0	1+1	0

==== Top scorers ====
Players with 1 goal or more included only.

Rk.	Nat.	Position	Player	Total	USL-1	Playoffs	U.S. Open Cup
1	(Guinea)	FW	Mandjou Keita	14	11	0	3
2	(United States)	MF	Ryan Pore	11	10	1	0
3	(United States)	FW	George Josten	6	5	0	1
3	(United States)	MF	Brian Farber	6	3	2	1
5	(United States)	MF	Keith Savage	3	3	0	0
5	(United States)	DF	David Hayes	3	2	0	1
7	(Japan)	FW	Takayuki Suzuki	2	2	0	0
7	(United States)	MF	Alex Nimo	2	1	1	0
9	(Sweden)	MF	Johan Claesson	1	1	0	0
9	(The Gambia)	DF	Mamadou Danso	1	1	0	0
9	(Sweden)	FW	Antouman Jallow	1	1	0	0
9	(United States)	DF	Stephen Keel	1	1	0	0
9	(United States)	MF	Tony McManus	1	1	0	0
9	(United States)	DF	Scot Thompson	1	1	0	0
9	(United States)	FW	Jason McLaughlin	1	0	0	1
			TOTALS	54	43	4	7

==== Disciplinary record ====
Players with 1 card or more included only.

No.	Nat.	Position	Player	Total		USL-1		Playoffs		U.S. Open Cup	
No.	Nat.	Position	Player	Booked	Sent off (straight red)	Booked	Sent off (straight red)	Booked	Sent off (straight red)	Booked	Sent off (straight red)
0	(United States)	GK	Steve Cronin	1	0	1	0	0	0	0	0
(1)	(United States)	GK	Chris Seitz	1	0	1	0	0	0	0	0
4	(United States)	MF	Brian Farber	2	0	1	0	0	0	1	0
5	(United States)	DF	David Hayes	3	0	2	0	0	0	1	0
6	(United States)	DF	Cameron Knowles	2	0	2	0	0	0	0	0
10	(Guinea)	FW	Mandjou Keita	1	0	1	0	0	0	0	0
11	(Sweden)	MF	Johan Claesson	2	0	2	0	0	0	0	0
12	(United States)	MF	Tony McManus	9	0	7	0	1	0	1	0
14	(United States)	FW	Jason McLaughlin	3	1	3	1	0	0	0	0
15	(United States)	FW	Kevin Forrest	1	0	1	0	0	0	0	0
16	(United States)	DF	Stephen Keel	3	0	3	0	0	0	0	0
17	(United States)	DF	Scot Thompson	1	0	1	0	0	0	0	0
18	(United States)	MF	Alex Nimo	3	0	3	0	0	0	0	0
19	(United States)	FW	George Josten	1	0	1	0	0	0	0	0
22	(United States)	MF	Keith Savage	2	0	1	0	0	0	1	0
23	(United States)	MF	Ryan Pore	7	0	6	0	1	0	0	0
28	(United States)	MF	Rodrigo López	1	0	0	0	1	0	0	0
30	(Japan)	FW	Takayuki Suzuki	2	0	2	0	0	0	0	0
98	(The Gambia)	DF	Mamadou Danso	4	0	4	0	0	0	0	0
			TOTALS	49	1	42	1	3	0	4	0

==== Goalkeeper stats ====
All goalkeepers included.

No.	Nat.	Player	Total				USL-1				Playoffs				U.S. Open Cup			
No.	Nat.	Player	MIN	GA	GAA	SV	MIN	GA	GAA	SV	MIN	GA	GAA	SV	MIN	GA	GAA	SV
0	(United States)	Steve Cronin	2958	26	0.79	110	2508	19	0.68	97	180	5	2.50	5	270	2	0.67	8
(1)	(United States)	Chris Seitz	180	0	0.00	15	180	0	0.00	15	0	0	–	0	0	0	–	0
24	(United States)	Brian Visser	12	0	0.00	1	12	0	0.00	1	0	0	–	0	0	0	–	0
		TOTALS	3150	26	0.74	126	2700	19	0.63	113	180	5	2.50	5	270	2	0.67	8

=== Player movement ===
==== Transfers in ====
Permanent

Date	Pos.	Name	Previous club	Fee/notes
January 16, 2009	FW	(Guinea) Mandjou Keita	Brunei DPMM	Free
January 16, 2009	MF	(Sweden) Johan Claesson	(Sweden) Sirius	Free
January 16, 2009	FW	(Sweden) Antouman Jallow	(Sweden) Sirius	Free
January 16, 2009	MF	(United States) Tony McManus	(United States) Atlanta Silverbacks	Free
January 16, 2009	FW	(United States) Jason McLaughlin	(United States) Atlanta Silverbacks	Free
January 16, 2009	MF	(United States) Brian Farber	(United States) Stockton Cougars	Free
February 12, 2009	DF	(Democratic Republic of the Congo) Dieumerci Vua	(Italy) Catania	Free
February 12, 2009	MF	(United States) Keith Savage	(United States) Chivas USA	Free
February 20, 2009	FW	(United States) George Josten	(United States) Columbus Crew	Free
February 20, 2009	MF	(United States) Josh Cameron (R)	(United States) Oregon State Beavers	Free
February 26, 2009	DF	(United States) David Hayes	(United States) Atlanta Silverbacks	Free
March 2, 2009	GK	(United States) Steve Cronin	(United States) Los Angeles Galaxy	Free
March 12, 2009	MF	(United States) Ryan Pore	(United States) Kansas City Wizards	Free
March 14, 2009	DF	(United States) Stephen Keel	(United States) Colorado Rapids	Free
March 27, 2009	GK	(United States) Brian Visser (R)	(United States) DePaul Blue Demons	Free
April 3, 2009	DF	(Japan) Takuro Nishimura	(Japan) Omiya Ardija	Free
April 21, 2009	DF	(The Gambia) Mamadou Danso (R)	(United States) Southern Poly Hornets (United States) Cary RailHawks U23's	Free
July 22, 2009	FW	(United States) Kevin Forrest	(United States) Seattle Sounders FC	Free
August 19, 2009	MF	(United States) Rodrigo López	(United States) Ventura County Fusion	Free
August 28, 2009	DF	(Mexico) Ivan Becerra	(United States) Ventura County Fusion	Free

Loan

Date	Pos.	Name	From	Return Date
March 10, 2009	MF	(United States) Alex Nimo	(United States) Real Salt Lake	End of Season
April 30, 2009	GK	(United States) Chris Seitz	(United States) Real Salt Lake	May 2, 2009

==== Transfers Out ====
Permanent

Date	Pos.	Name	To	Fee
End of 2008 season	FW	(Mexico) Byron Alvarez	N/A	Contract expired
End of 2008 season	FW	(United States) Chris Bagley	N/A	Contract expired
End of 2008 season	MF	(United States) Neil Dombrowski	N/A	Contract expired
End of 2008 season	GK	(United States) Chase Harrison	N/A	Contract expired
End of 2008 season	GK	(United States) Jordan James	N/A	Contract expired
End of 2008 season	DF	(United States) Tim Karalexis	N/A	Contract expired
End of 2008 season	MF	(Ivory Coast) Arsène Oka	N/A	Contract expired
End of 2008 season	MF	(United States) Troy Ready	N/A	Contract expired
End of 2008 season	GK	(United States) Steve Reese	N/A	Contract expired
End of 2008 season	DF	(Canada) Justin Thompson	N/A	Contract expired
End of 2008 season	FW	(Solomon Islands) Benjamin Totori	N/A	Contract expired
End of 2008 season	FW	(United States) Jamil Walker	N/A	Contract expired
January 2, 2009	FW	(United States) Chris Brown	N/A	Retired
February 20, 2009	MF	(Scotland) Bryan Little	Unattached	Released
March 4, 2009	MF	(Kenya) Lawrence Olum	(United States) Minnesota Thunder	Undisclosed
March 2009	MF	(United States) Kiki Lara	Unattached	Undisclosed release
March 27, 2009	MF	(United States) Miguel Guante	Unattached	Released
April 21, 2009	DF	(Democratic Republic of the Congo) Dieumerci Vua	Unattached	Released

Loan

Date	Pos.	Name	To	Return Date
July 28, 2009	FW	(Sweden) Antouman Jallow	(Sweden) Sandviken	End of season
