= ISLANO =

International Soccer League Association New Orleans
- Founded: 1990
- Country: United States
- Confederation: CONCACAF; US Soccer; USASA; LSA
- Divisions: 1
- Number of clubs: 11 (2014)
- Promotion to: None
- Relegation to: None
- Domestic cup(s): Lamar Hunt U.S. Open Cup; USASA Region III National Cup; Louisiana Adult State Cup
- Current champions: Motagua New Orleans

The International Soccer League Association New Orleans (ISLANO) was a men's amateur soccer league in New Orleans, LA.

2013 champions, Motagua New Orleans, represented the LSA and ISLANO in the 2013 USASA Region III National Cup.

== Notable players and coaches ==
This list of notable players and coaches comprises players who have played professionally or internationally, whether before or after their tenure in ISLANO.

- (Honduras) Eduardo Laing
- (Honduras) Steven Morris
- (United States) Anthony Peters
- (Honduras) Víctor Ortiz
- (Honduras) Samir Arzú
- (Honduras) Donaldo Morales
- (Honduras) Jaime Rosales
- (Honduras) Hendry Cordova
