= Samir Arzú =

Honduran footballer (born 1981)

Personal information
- Full name: Samir Enrique Arzú García
- Date of birth: 19 March 1981 (age 45)
- Place of birth: Jutiapa, Honduras
- Height: 1.76 m (5 ft 9 in)
- Position: Midfielder

Team information
- Current team: Motagua New Orleans

Senior career*
Years	Team	Apps	(Gls)
2001–2006	Real España		
2006–2007	Hispano		
2007	Real Juventud		
2008	Atlético Olanchano		
2008–2009	Olimpia		
2009	Correcaminos UAT	9	(0)
2010	Real Juventud		
2010–2013	Victoria		
2012	→ Shanghai Tellace (loan)		
2013	Suchitepéquez	15	(1)
2014	Vida		
2014–2015	Barillas		
2015	Deportivo Jocotán		
2016	Victoria	2	(0)
2016–	Motagua New Orleans	38	(12)

International career
2004	Honduras U23		
- * Club domestic league appearances and goals as of 10:12, 23 August 2019 (UTC)

Samir Enrique Arzú García (born 19 March 1981) is a Honduran professional footballer who plays as a midfielder for Motagua New Orleans.

== Club career ==
Arzú began his career in Honduras with Real España, which preceded a move to fellow Honduran clubs Hispano, Real Juventud, Atlético Olanchano and Olimpia between 2006 and 2009; he featured twice for Olimpia during the 2008–09 CONCACAF Champions League. In 2009, Arzú completed a move to Correcaminos UAT of Liga de Ascenso. He made his professional debut against León on 31 July, which was the first of nine appearances in Mexico's second tier. Arzú sealed a return to Real Juventud in 2010, before signing for Victoria a year later - he scored three goals for each club in a season.

China League One side Shanghai Tellace loaned Arzú for the 2012 campaign. The club won the title and promotion in his sole season in China. After returning to Victoria for the first part of 2013, he found himself on the move again later in the year after agreeing to play for Suchitepéquez of the Liga Nacional de Fútbol de Guatemala. He netted on his debut, scoring the third goal of a 4–1 home win over Xelajú on 4 August 2013. Arzú had subsequent spells with Vida, Barillas and Deportivo Jocotán, prior to a short return to Victoria in 2016. Arzú joined USA's Gulf Coast Premier League team Motagua New Orleans in 2016.

== International career ==
Arzú represented the Honduras U23s in the 2004 CONCACAF Men's Pre-Olympic Tournament, as his nation narrowly missed out on the 2004 Summer Olympics in Greece after placing third.

== Career statistics ==
As of 23 August 2019

Appearances and goals by club, season and competition
Club	Season	League			National cup		League cup		Continental		Other		Total	
Club	Season	Division	Apps	Goals	Apps	Goals	Apps	Goals	Apps	Goals	Apps	Goals	Apps	Goals
Correcaminos UAT	2009–10	Liga de Ascenso	9	0	0	0	—		—		0	0	9	0
Suchitepéquez	2013–14	Guatemalan Liga Nacional	15	1	—		—		—		0	0	15	1
Victoria	2015–16	Honduras Liga Nacional	2	0	0	0	—		—		0	0	2	0
Motagua New Orleans	2015–16	Gulf Coast Premier League	1	0	0	0	—		—		0	0	1	0
Motagua New Orleans	2016–17	Gulf Coast Premier League	11	4	0	0	—		—		0	0	11	4
Motagua New Orleans	2017	Gulf Coast Premier League	9	1	0	0	—		—		0	0	9	1
Motagua New Orleans	2018	Gulf Coast Premier League	7	1	0	0	—		—		0	0	7	1
Motagua New Orleans	2019	Gulf Coast Premier League	10	6	0	0	—		—		0	0	10	6
Motagua New Orleans	Total		38	12	0	0	—		—		0	0	38	12
Career total			64	13	0	0	—		—		0	0	64	13

== Honours ==
Shanghai Tellace

- China League One: 2012

Motagua New Orleans

- Gulf Coast Premier League: 2015–16, 2016–17
