= 2018 GCPL season =

Gulf Coast Premier League
- Season: 2018
- Matches: 79
- Goals: 363 (4.59 per match)
- Top goalscorer: Quesi Weston
- Highest attendance: 1532
- Lowest attendance: 21
- All statistics correct as of August 1st, 2018.

The 2018 Gulf Coast Premier League season was the 3rd season of the GCPL.

== Changes from 2017 ==
=== Incoming teams ===
Team	Location	Notes
Central Texas Lobos FC	Kyle, TX	Joined from Texas Premier Soccer League
Gulf Coast Rangers FC	Mobile, AL	Expansion
Mississippi Blues SC	Clinton, MS	Expansion
Northshore United FC	Covington, LA	Expansion
Real United Riverhawks FC	Pascagoula, MS	Expansion
Shreveport United	Shreveport, LA	Expansion

=== Moved and/or Rebranded teams ===
Team	Prev Name	Location	Prev Location	Notes
Alexandria PBFC	Pool Boys FC	Pineville, LA	Alexandria, LA	Rebranded and moved
Pensacola FC	Gulf Coast Texans	Pensacola, FL	Pensacola, FL	Rebranded
Port City FC	Biloxi City FC	Gulfport, MS	Gulfport, MS	Rebranded

=== Outgoing teams ===
Team	Location	Notes
Lake City Gamblers	Lake Charles, LA	Not listed on GCPL website
Louisiana Fire	Kenner, LA	Not listed on GCPL website

== Standings ==
=== Central Division ===
Pos	Team	Pld	W	L	T	GF	GA	GD	Pts	Qualification
1	Motagua New Orleans	10	8	1	1	31	13	+18	25	2018 GCPL playoffs
2	Gaffa FC	10	6	2	2	32	20	+12	20	2018 GCPL playoffs
3	Baton Rouge United	10	3	5	2	22	26	−4	11	
4	Northshore United	10	3	6	1	24	25	−1	10	
5	Mississippi Blues SC	10	1	6	3	11	24	−13	6	

Source: GCPL standings
Rules for classification: 1) points; 2) head to head; 3) goal differential in head to head results; 4) wins; 5) total goal differential; 6) fewest losses; 7) coin toss

=== East Division ===
Pos	Team	Pld	W	L	T	GF	GA	GD	Pts	Qualification
1	Port City FC	10	8	1	1	36	13	+23	25	2018 GCPL playoffs
2	Gulf Coast Rangers	10	5	2	3	29	12	+17	18	2018 GCPL playoffs
3	Pensacola FC	10	4	3	3	24	17	+7	15	
4	AFC Mobile	10	4	6	0	27	20	+7	12	
5	Real United FC	10	1	9	0	5	63	−58	3	

Source: GCPL standings
Rules for classification: 1) points; 2) head to head; 3) goal differential in head to head results; 4) wins; 5) total goal differential; 6) fewest losses; 7) coin toss

=== West Division ===
Pos	Team	Pld	W	L	T	GF	GA	GD	Pts	Qualification
1	BOCA FC	10	9	0	1	43	11	+32	28	2018 GCPL playoffs
2	Cajun SC	10	6	3	1	40	11	+29	19	2018 GCPL playoffs
3	Alexandria PBFC	10	5	5	0	25	16	+9	15	
4	Central Texas Lobos	10	3	7	0	10	31	−21	9	
5	Shreveport United	10	0	10	0	0	59	−59	0	

Source: GCPL standings
Rules for classification: 1) points; 2) head to head; 3) goal differential in head to head results; 4) wins; 5) total goal differential; 6) fewest losses; 7) coin toss

== Playoffs ==
Quarterfinals
C2	Gaffa FC	1
W2	Cajun SC	3
C1	Motagua New Orleans	3
E2	Gulf Coast Rangers	2

Semifinals
W1	BOCA FC	0
W2	Cajun SC	1
E1	Port City FC	5
C1	Motagua New Orleans	3

Final
W2	Cajun SC	0
E1	Port City FC	4
