= Gaffa =

Gaffa may refer to:

- Gaffa (magazine), a Danish music magazine
  - Gaffa Awards, an annual musical prize awarded by the magazine
- Gaffa tape, or Gaffer tape, a type of adhesive tape
- Gaffa FC, an association football club from Mississippi, US
