= 2014 LSA Adult State Cup =

Tournament details
- Country: United States
- Teams: 6

Final positions
- Champions: Motagua New Orleans
- Runner-up: Cajun SC

Tournament statistics
- Matches played: 12
- Top goal scorer(s): (United States) Brandon Chagnard (6 goals)

The 2014 LSA Adult State Cup is a qualifying tournament that will determine which clubs from Louisiana will qualify for the 2014 USASA Region III National Cup. The LSA Adult State Cup began on March 14, 2014, and ended on May 16, 2014.

== Group stage ==
=== Group A ===
Team	Pld	W	D	L	GF	GA	GD	Pts	Qualification	CAJ	CRO	ULL
Cajun SC (Q)	4	4	0	0	12	1	+11	12	Advanced to the final		5–1	2–0
Crossroads Pool Boys	4	1	1	2	5	8	−3	4	Advanced to the 3rd place game	0–1		2–0
UL Lafayette Club	4	0	1	3	2	10	−8	1		2–2	0–4	

(Q) Qualified for the 2014 USASA Region III National Cup

=== Group B ===
Team	Pld	W	D	L	GF	GA	GD	Pts	Qualification	MOT	FCN	LSU
Motagua New Orleans (Q)	4	3	1	0	15	8	+7	10	Advanced to the final		2–1	7–3
FC New Orleans	4	2	0	2	8	6	+2	6	Advanced to the 3rd place game	2–4		2–0
LSU Club	4	0	1	3	5	14	−9	1		0–3 (Note: Forfeited)	2–2	

(Q) Qualified for the 2014 USASA Region III National Cup

== Final round ==
=== 3rd place game ===
16 May 2014
18:00

FC New Orleans	(F)0-3	Crossroads Pool Boys

Moore Park, Lafayette

(F)=Forfeited

- Winner of 3rd Place game advances to the 2014 Region III Amateur Cup

=== Final ===
16 May 2014
20:00

Cajun SC	1-3	Motagua New Orleans

Moore Park, Lafayette
