= Stephen Keel =

American soccer player (born 1983)

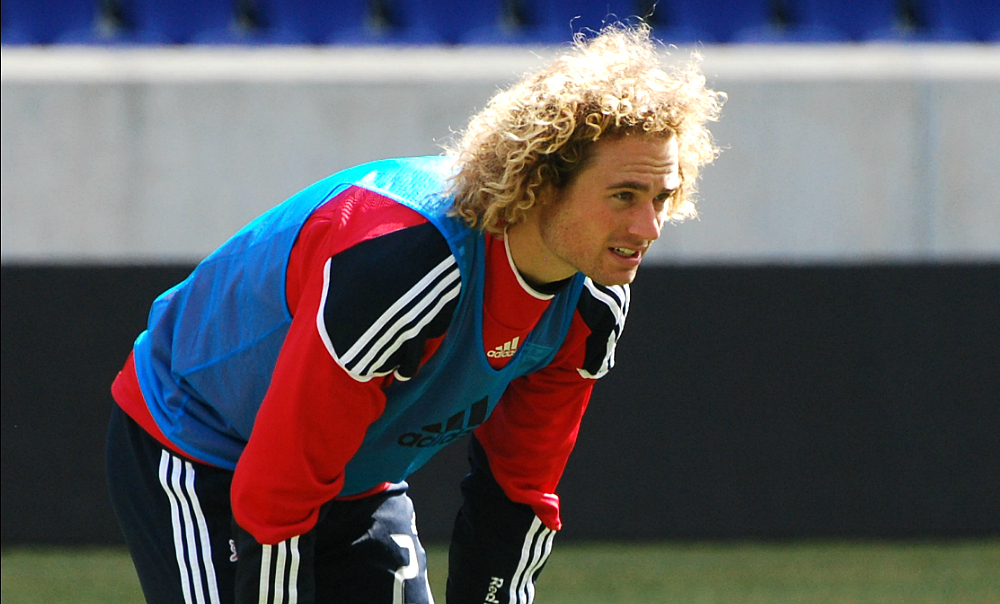
- Keel in 2011

Personal information
- Date of birth: April 11, 1983 (age 43)
- Place of birth: Littleton, Colorado, United States
- Height: 6 ft 0 in (1.83 m)
- Position: Defender

College career
Years	Team	Apps	(Gls)
2001–2004	Wake Forest Demon Deacons		

Senior career*
Years	Team	Apps	(Gls)
2003	Bradenton Academics	6	(1)
2005–2008	Colorado Rapids	10	(0)
2006	→ Seattle Sounders (loan)	10	(1)
2009–2010	Portland Timbers	52	(1)
2011–2012	New York Red Bulls	25	(0)
2013–2015	FC Dallas	24	(1)
2013–2014	FC Dallas Reserves	9	(1)
- * Club domestic league appearances and goals

Stephen Keel (born April 11, 1983) is an American former professional soccer player who played as a defender

== Career ==
=== College and amateur ===
Keel was born in Littleton, Colorado. He played college soccer at Wake Forest University from 2001 to 2004 where he appeared in 63 games scoring 13 goals and adding 9 assists. During his college career he also played with Bradenton Academics in the USL Premier Development League.

=== Professional ===
On July 11, 2005, Keel signed a developmental contract with the Colorado Rapids. During the 2006 season Keel spent time on loan with the Seattle Sounders of the USL First Division, scoring 1 goal in 10 games for the team. While with Colorado Keel appeared in 36 games with the Rapids reserves, leading the reserve team to back-to-back MLS Reserve Division championships in 2006 and 2007 and was named MLS Magazine's Reserve Player of the Year following the 2007 season.

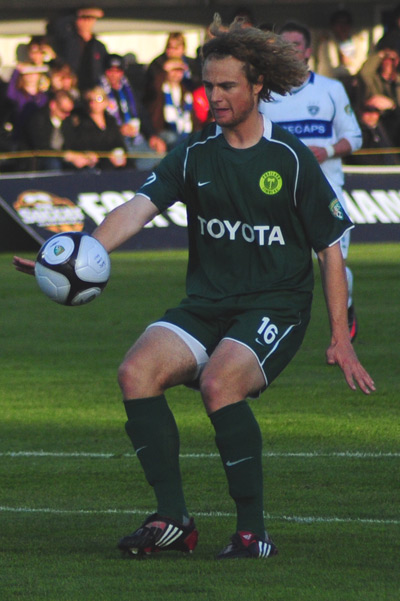
Keel playing for Portland Timbers

He was waived by the Rapids on March 13, 2009, and subsequently signed for the Portland Timbers on March 16, 2009. In his first season with Portland Keel appeared in 29 league matches scoring 1 goal in helping the club capture the USL First Division Commissioner's Cup as regular season champions. In his second season with Portland Keel remained a fixture in the Timber defense and helped the club reach the playoffs. On May 29, 2010, Keel scored Portland's second goal in a 3–2 come from behind victory over Argentina's Boca Juniors in a friendly played at PGE Park.

On March 9, 2011, Keel joined New York Red Bulls after a trial stint. On March 26, 2011, Keel made his official debut for New York playing the full 90 in a 0–0 draw against Columbus Crew. By the end of the season Keel became a regular starter for New York and helped the club qualify for the MLS playoffs.

On November 19, 2012, New York announced it declined options for ten players including Keel. Keel chose to enter the 2012 MLS Re-Entry Draft held in December 2012. He was selected by FC Dallas in stage two of the re-entry draft and signed with the club on January 9, 2013. He scored his first goal on October 26, 2013, in a 2–1 away loss to the San Jose Earthquakes in the 90th minute. His goal was a header and was assisted by Blas Perez. During a 2014 Lamar Hunt U.S. Open Cup semifinal game against the Philadelphia Union, he suffered a foot injury that caused him to miss the rest of the MLS season. He also spent much of 2015 rehabbing the injury and did not appear in any first team games.

Keel became a free agent after the 2015 season and was not re-signed by FC Dallas.

== Honors ==
Portland Timbers

- USL First Division Commissioner's Cup: 2009
