= 2009 United Soccer Leagues =

23rd season of the United Soccer Leagues

The 2009 season was the 23rd season played by the United Soccer Leagues. Season titles will be contested by 20 professional men's clubs in the USL First Division and USL Second Division, as well as 37 professional and amateur women's clubs in the W-League and 68 professional and amateur men's teams in the USL Premier Development League.

The First Division season kicked off on April 11 with the US Open Cup finalist Charleston Battery and host defending champions Vancouver Whitecaps FC playing to a scoreless tie, while the Carolina RailHawks defeated the visiting Minnesota Thunder 2–1. The season ended on September 20 with the Charleston Battery defeating hosts Minnesota Thunder 3–2. As a change for this season, the Finals will follow the rest of the playoffs in being two legs. The playoffs started on September 24, and ended on October 17 with the Montreal Impact defeating Vancouver Whitecaps FC on a 6–3 aggregate score.

The Second Division season started on April 17 with the Pittsburgh Riverhounds and host Crystal Palace Baltimore playing to a scoreless tie. The regular season ended on August 15 with three games. The Richmond Kickers captured the title in the playoffs with a 3–1 win over the Charlotte Eagles on August 29.

2009 USL-1 (red) and USL-2 (green) franchises. Not shown: Puerto Rico Islanders, Bermuda Hogges.

== General ==
- Changes in the First Division: the Cleveland City Stars were promoted from Second Division and the Austin Aztex were added as an expansion team. The Atlanta Silverbacks went on hiatus for the season, and the Seattle Sounders were replaced by an expansion MLS team.
- Changes in the Second Division: the Cleveland City Stars were promoted to the First Division.
- In the PDL, 9 teams withdrew for the 2009 season, while 10 expansion teams increase the league to 68 teams in 8 divisions across 4 conferences. Teams play a 16-game league schedule.
- In the W-League, 6 teams withdrew for the 2009 season, while 2 expansion teams were added, leaving the league at 37 members. Sky Blue and Washington Freedom were given WPS teams, with Washington playing their reserves in the W-League and Sky Blue selling their W-League team.

== Honors ==
| Competition | Champion | Runner-up | Regular season champion/Best USL team |
|---|---|---|---|
| USL First Division | Montreal Impact | Vancouver Whitecaps FC | Portland Timbers |
| USL Second Division | Richmond Kickers | Charlotte Eagles | Wilmington Hammerheads |
| USL PDL | Ventura County Fusion | Chicago Fire Premier | Reading Rage |
| U.S. Open Cup | Seattle Sounders FC | D.C. United | Rochester Rhinos |
| Canadian Championship | Toronto FC (MLS) | Vancouver Whitecaps FC | n/a |
| USL W-League | Pali Blues | Washington Freedom Reserves | Hudson Valley Quickstrike Lady Blues |

== First Division ==
USL First Division
- Season: 2009
- Champions: Montreal Impact (3rd Title)
- Premiers: Portland Timbers (2nd Title)
- Goals: 388
- Average goals/game: 2.35
- Best player: Cristian Arrieta, Puerto Rico Islanders
- Top goalscorer: (Canada) Charles Gbeke, Vancouver Whitecaps (12 goals)
- Best goalkeeper: (United States) Steve Cronin, Portland Timbers
- Biggest home win: 9 – 0 (Carolina vs Miami)
- Biggest away win: 4 – 1 (Portland @ Rochester); 3 – 0 (Portland @ Miami, Carolina @ Cleveland, Rochester @ Cleveland)
- Highest scoring: 9 – 0 (Carolina vs Miami)
- Longest winning run: 5 (Portland, Puerto Rico)
- Longest unbeaten run: 24 (Portland)
- Longest losing run: 6 (Miami)
- Highest attendance: 14,103 (Portland)
- Lowest attendance: 67 (Miami)
- Average attendance: 4,702

=== Regular season ===
==== Standings ====
| Pos | Team | Pld | W | L | T | GF | GA | GD | Pts | Qualification |
|---|---|---|---|---|---|---|---|---|---|---|
| 1 | Portland Timbers | 30 | 16 | 4 | 10 | 45 | 19 | +26 | 58 | Commissioner's Cup, bye to semifinal round of playoffs |
| 2 | Carolina RailHawks | 30 | 16 | 7 | 7 | 43 | 19 | +24 | 55 | Quarterfinal round of playoffs |
| 3 | Puerto Rico Islanders | 30 | 15 | 7 | 8 | 44 | 31 | +13 | 53 (Note: Head-to-head: PUE: 6 pts, CHA: 3 pts) | Quarterfinal round of playoffs |
| 4 | Charleston Battery | 30 | 14 | 5 | 11 | 33 | 21 | +12 | 53 | Quarterfinal round of playoffs |
| 5 | Montreal Impact (C) | 30 | 12 | 11 | 7 | 32 | 31 | +1 | 44 (Note: 1 bonus point awarded?) | Quarterfinal round of playoffs |
| 6 | Rochester Rhinos | 30 | 11 | 9 | 10 | 34 | 32 | +2 | 43 | Quarterfinal round of playoffs |
| 7 | Vancouver Whitecaps | 30 | 11 | 10 | 9 | 42 | 36 | +6 | 42 | Quarterfinal round of playoffs |
| 8 | Minnesota Thunder | 30 | 7 | 13 | 10 | 39 | 44 | −5 | 31 | |
| 9 | Miami FC | 30 | 8 | 17 | 5 | 26 | 52 | −26 | 29 | |
| 10 | Austin Aztex | 30 | 5 | 17 | 8 | 28 | 51 | −23 | 21 (Note: Austin deducted two points for fielding an ineligible player on July 25, 2009) | |
| 11 | Cleveland City Stars | 30 | 4 | 19 | 7 | 22 | 52 | −30 | 19 | |

(C) Playoff Champion

==== Results ====
Color Key: Home • Away • Win • Loss • Tie
| Club | Match | | | | | | | | | | | | | | | | | | | | | | | | | | | | | |
| Club | 1 | 2 | 3 | 4 | 5 | 6 | 7 | 8 | 9 | 10 | 11 | 12 | 13 | 14 | 15 | 16 | 17 | 18 | 19 | 20 | 21 | 22 | 23 | 24 | 25 | 26 | 27 | 28 | 29 | 30 |
|---|---|---|---|---|---|---|---|---|---|---|---|---|---|---|---|---|---|---|---|---|---|---|---|---|---|---|---|---|---|---|
| Austin Aztex (AUS) | MIN | VAN | CLE | PUE | MTL | CAR | PUE | CHA | CHA | PUE | MIA | CAR | ROC | CLE | CLE | ROC | POR | MIN | MTL | CHA | CAR | ROC | MIN | MTL | MIA | VAN | MIA | POR | POR | VAN |
| Austin Aztex (AUS) | 1–1 | 1–1 | 3–0 | 1–1 | 4–0 | 0–1 | 3–1 | 0–2 | 1–1 | 1–4 | 0–2 | 1–1 | 0–2 | 2–2 | 0–1 | 4–1 | 1–2 | 1–0 | 2–2 | 1–0 | 0–3 | 1–0 | 2–2 | 2–0 | 1–0 | 3–2 | 3–1 | 0–1 | 1–2 | 2–1 |
| Carolina RailHawks (CAR) | MIN | ROC | MIN | POR | POR | CHA | MIA | CLE | AUS | CLE | POR | MIN | AUS | PUE | CHA | VAN | CHA | MIA | AUS | ROC | CLE | VAN | VAN | ROC | MIA | MTL | MTL | PUE | PUE | MTL |
| Carolina RailHawks (CAR) | 2–1 | 1–0 | 1–0 | 0–0 | 2–0 | 1–2 | 0–2 | 0–3 | 0–1 | 1–0 | 0–0 | 2–0 | 1–1 | 1–2 | 0–1 | 2–1 | 2–1 | 4–0 | 3–0 | 0–1 | 2–0 | 0–0 | 1–1 | 0–0 | 9–0 | 1–1 | 1–0 | 2–0 | 2–1 | 2–0 |
| Charleston Battery (CHA) | VAN | MTL | MIN | MIA | CAR | MTL | MIA | ROC | CLE | AUS | AUS | POR | PUE | PUE | PUE | MTL | CAR | CLE | ROC | CAR | AUS | VAN | POR | CLE | VAN | POR | MIN | MIA | ROC | MIN |
| Charleston Battery (CHA) | 0–0 | 0–0 | 1–1 | 0–1 | 1–2 | 0–0 | 1–0 | 2–0 | 2–0 | 0–2 | 1–1 | 1–1 | 1–0 | 1–0 | 1–0 | 0–1 | 0–1 | 0–0 | 1–1 | 2–1 | 1–0 | 1–2 | 3–1 | 4–1 | 1–1 | 0–0 | 1–3 | 2–1 | 0–0 | 2–3 |
| Cleveland City Stars (CLE) | MIA | AUS | ROC | POR | MIN | CAR | CAR | CHA | PUE | PUE | ROC | MIA | MIA | VAN | AUS | AUS | PUE | CHA | MTL | ROC | VAN | CAR | CHA | MTL | MIN | MIN | MTL | POR | POR | VAN |
| Cleveland City Stars (CLE) | 3–1 | 3–0 | 0–3 | 0–0 | 0–1 | 0–3 | 1–0 | 2–0 | 2–1 | 2–2 | 3–0 | 1–2 | 0–1 | 2–2 | 2–2 | 0–1 | 0–0 | 0–0 | 4–1 | 4–1 | 0–0 | 2–0 | 4–1 | 1–2 | 1–0 | 3–0 | 1–2 | 0–1 | 2–1 | 2–1 |
| Miami FC (MIA) | CLE | MTL | ROC | CHA | CAR | CHA | MIN | VAN | AUS | CLE | CLE | MTL | PUE | VAN | POR | POR | MIN | CAR | MTL | PUE | MIN | POR | VAN | CAR | AUS | AUS | ROC | CHA | ROC | PUE |
| Miami FC (MIA) | 3–1 | 2–1 | 1–2 | 0–1 | 0–2 | 1–0 | 0–0 | 3–2 | 2–0 | 1–2 | 0–1 | 1–0 | 0–0 | 2–1 | 1–1 | 0–3 | 1–2 | 4–0 | 1–1 | 4–0 | 0–1 | 3–1 | 0–2 | 9–0 | 1–0 | 3–1 | 1–2 | 2–1 | 0–0 | 3–1 |
| Minnesota Thunder (MIN) | CAR | AUS | CHA | CAR | VAN | CLE | MIA | PUE | ROC | CAR | POR | ROC | POR | VAN | MTL | AUS | MIA | POR | MTL | MIA | AUS | ROC | CLE | CLE | PUE | VAN | CHA | PUE | MTL | CHA |
| Minnesota Thunder (MIN) | 2–1 | 1–1 | 1–1 | 1–0 | 3–2 | 1–0 | 0–0 | 1–0 | 0–0 | 2–0 | 5–1 | 1–2 | 1–1 | 4–0 | 3–0 | 1–0 | 1–2 | 1–1 | 1–0 | 0–1 | 2–2 | 3–3 | 1–0 | 3–0 | 3–1 | 1–1 | 1–3 | 5–2 | 1–1 | 2–3 |
| Montreal Impact (MTL) | CHA | MIA | PUE | ROC | CHA | AUS | ROC | POR | VAN | VAN | MIA | POR | CHA | MIN | ROC | PUE | CLE | AUS | MIA | MIN | POR | PUE | CLE | AUS | CAR | CAR | CLE | VAN | MIN | CAR |
| Montreal Impact (MTL) | 0–0 | 2–1 | 3–2 | 1–2 | 0–0 | 4–0 | 0–1 | 1–0 | 1–2 | 2–1 | 1–0 | 4–0 | 0–1 | 2–0 | 0–0 | 0–1 | 4–1 | 2–2 | 1–1 | 1–0 | 0–1 | 1–0 | 1–2 | 2–0 | 1–1 | 1–0 | 1–2 | 1–0 | 1–1 | 2–0 |
| Portland Timbers (POR) | VAN | CAR | CAR | CLE | ROC | PUE | PUE | VAN | MTL | CAR | CHA | MIN | MTL | MIN | AUS | MIA | MIA | PUE | MIN | VAN | CHA | MTL | ROC | MIA | CHA | ROC | AUS | AUS | CLE | CLE |
| Portland Timbers (POR) | 1–0 | 0–0 | 2–0 | 0–0 | 2–1 | 1–1 | 1–2 | 2–0 | 1–0 | 0–0 | 1–1 | 5–1 | 4–0 | 1–1 | 1–2 | 1–1 | 0–3 | 0–0 | 1–1 | 1–0 | 3–1 | 0–1 | 1–4 | 3–1 | 0–0 | 1–2 | 0–1 | 1–2 | 0–1 | 2–1 |
| Puerto Rico Islanders (PUE) | VAN | ROC | MTL | AUS | VAN | POR | POR | AUS | MIN | CLE | CLE | AUS | CHA | CHA | CHA | CAR | MIA | ROC | CLE | MTL | POR | VAN | MIA | MTL | MIN | ROC | CAR | MIN | CAR | MIA |
| Puerto Rico Islanders (PUE) | 2–1 | 0–0 | 3–2 | 1–1 | 1–0 | 1–1 | 1–2 | 3–1 | 1–2 | 2–1 | 2–2 | 4–1 | 1–0 | 1–0 | 1–0 | 1–2 | 0–0 | 0–0 | 0–0 | 0–1 | 0–0 | 4–2 | 4–0 | 1–0 | 3–1 | 2–0 | 2–0 | 5–2 | 2–1 | 3–1 |
| Rochester Rhinos (ROC) | CAR | PUE | MIA | CLE | MTL | POR | VAN | CHA | MTL | MIN | CLE | AUS | MIN | AUS | PUE | MTL | CHA | CLE | VAN | CAR | AUS | POR | MIN | CAR | VAN | POR | PUE | MIA | MIA | CHA |
| Rochester Rhinos (ROC) | 1–0 | 0–0 | 1–2 | 0–3 | 1–2 | 2–1 | 1–2 | 2–0 | 0–1 | 0–0 | 3–0 | 0–2 | 1–2 | 4–1 | 0–0 | 0–0 | 1–1 | 4–1 | 1–3 | 0–1 | 1–0 | 1–4 | 3–3 | 0–0 | 1–1 | 1–2 | 2–0 | 1–2 | 0–0 | 0–0 |
| Vancouver Whitecaps FC (VAN) | CHA | PUE | AUS | POR | MIN | PUE | ROC | POR | MTL | MIA | MTL | CLE | MIN | MIA | CAR | PUE | ROC | CLE | POR | CHA | CAR | CAR | CHA | MIA | ROC | AUS | MIN | MTL | AUS | CLE |
| Vancouver Whitecaps FC (VAN) | 0–0 | 2–1 | 1–1 | 1–0 | 2–3 | 1–0 | 1–2 | 2–0 | 1–2 | 3–2 | 2–1 | 2–2 | 4–0 | 2–1 | 2–1 | 4–2 | 1–3 | 0–0 | 1–0 | 1–2 | 0–0 | 1–1 | 1–1 | 2–0 | 1–1 | 3–2 | 1–1 | 1–0 | 2–1 | 2–1 |

=== Playoffs ===
Teams were re-seeded for semifinal matchups.

Quarterfinals
2 | Carolina RailHawks FC | 0 | 0 | 0
7 | Vancouver Whitecaps FC | 1 | 0 | 1
3 | Puerto Rico Islanders | 1 | 4 | 5
6 | Rochester Rhinos | 2 | 1 | 3
4 | Charleston Battery | 0 | 1 | 1
5 | Montreal Impact | 2 | 2 | 4

Semifinals
1 | Portland Timbers | 1 | 3 | 4
7 | Vancouver Whitecaps FC | 2 | 3 | 5
3 | Puerto Rico Islanders | 1 | 1 | 2
5 | Montreal Impact | 2 | 2 | 4

Final
7 | Vancouver Whitecaps FC | 2 | 1 | 3
5 | Montreal Impact | 3 | 3 | 6

==== Quarterfinals ====
September 24, 2009
7:05 PM EDT

| Rochester Rhinos | 2–1 | Puerto Rico Islanders |
|---|---|---|
| Bertz 64'; Ball 71'; Short (yellow card) 74' | (Report) | Arrieta (red card) 7'; Hansen (yellow card) 68'; Addlery 72' |

Marina Auto Stadium
Rochester, New York
Attendance: 4,800
Referee: Chris Penso (United States)
September 27, 2009
7:00 PM ADT

| Puerto Rico Islanders | 4–1 | Rochester Rhinos |
|---|---|---|
| Noël 12', 80'; Addlery 40', 90' (yellow card) 84' | (Report) | Sancho (yellow card) 24' (yellow-red card) 29'; Nunes 82' |

Juan Ramón Loubriel Stadium
Bayamón, Puerto Rico
Attendance: 4,232
Referee: Jose Rivero (United States)

Puerto Rico Islanders won 5–3 on aggregate.

September 24, 2009
7:45 PM EDT

| Montreal Impact | 2–0 | Charleston Battery |
|---|---|---|
| Testo 10'; Di Lorenzo (yellow card) 12'; Placentino 88' (yellow card) 88' | (Report) | Bobo (yellow card) 10' (yellow-red card) 45' |

Saputo Stadium
Montreal, Quebec
Attendance: 11,282
Referee: Dave Gantar (Canada)
September 27, 2009
7:00 PM EDT

| Charleston Battery | 1–2 | Montreal Impact |
|---|---|---|
| Fuller 16' (yellow card) 72'; Wilson (yellow card) 76' | (Report) | deRoux (yellow card) 16'; Pizzolitto 23'; Donatelli 74' (yellow card) 82' |

Blackbaud Stadium
Charleston, South Carolina
Attendance: 2,311
Referee: Mark Kadlecik (United States)

Montreal Impact won 4–1 on aggregate.

September 24, 2009
7:30 PM PDT

| Vancouver Whitecaps FC | 1–0 | Carolina RailHawks FC |
|---|---|---|
| Versailles (yellow card) 64'; Edwini-Bonsu 77' | (Report) | Low (yellow card) 78'; Paladini (yellow card) 80' |

Swangard Stadium
Burnaby, British Columbia
Attendance: 5,135
Referee: Fabrizio Romano (Canada)
September 27, 2009
5:00 PM EDT

| Carolina RailHawks FC | 0–0 | Vancouver Whitecaps FC |
|---|---|---|
| Rusin (yellow card) 52'; Plotkin (yellow card) 76' | (Report) | Bellisomo (yellow card) 43'; Nash (yellow card) 59'; Martin (yellow card) 75' |

WakeMed Soccer Park
Cary, North Carolina
Attendance: 2,471
Referee: Niko Bratsis (United States)

Vancouver Whitecaps won 1–0 on aggregate.

==== Semifinals ====
October 1, 2009
7:30 PM EDT

| Montreal Impact | 2–1 | Puerto Rico Islanders |
|---|---|---|
| Donatelli 8'; Brown 20'; Pizzolitto (yellow card) 58' | (Report) | Jones (yellow card) 6'; Steele 31' |

Saputo Stadium
Montreal, Quebec
Attendance: 9,835
Referee: Carol Anne Chenard (CAN)
October 4, 2009
7:00 PM ADT

| Puerto Rico Islanders | 1–2 | Montreal Impact |
|---|---|---|
| Vélez (yellow card) 44'; Hansen 86' (pen.); Nuñez (yellow card) 90' | (Report) | Byers 2' deRoux (yellow card) 16'; Pizzolitto (yellow card) 24'; Joqueviel (yellow card) 81'; Sebrango 90' |

Juan Ramón Loubriel Stadium
Bayamón, Puerto Rico
Attendance: 5,101
Referee: Oscar Ortiz (USA)

Montreal Impact won 4–2 on aggregate.

October 1, 2009
7:30 PM PDT

| Vancouver Whitecaps FC | 2–1 | Portland Timbers |
|---|---|---|
| Gbeke 25'; Reda (red card) 45'; Haber 49'; James (yellow card) 66'; Versailles (yellow card) 76' | (Report) | Pore 44' (pen.) |

Swangard Stadium
Burnaby, British Columbia
Attendance: 4,516
Referee: Geoff Gamble (CAN)
October 4, 2009
4:00 PM PDT

| Portland Timbers | 3–3 | Vancouver Whitecaps FC |
|---|---|---|
| Farber 10', 43'; McManus (yellow card) 26'; Pore (yellow card) 66'; Nimo 83'; López (yellow card) 90' | (Report) | Haber 4' (yellow card) 62'; Nash 60'; James 71' |

PGE Park
Portland, Oregon
Attendance: 14,283
Referee: Hilario Grajeda (USA)

Vancouver Whitecaps won 5–4 on aggregate.

==== Finals ====
October 10, 2009
6:30 PM PDT

| Vancouver Whitecaps FC | 2–3 | Montreal Impact |
|---|---|---|
| Nash (red card) 51'; Haber 56'; James 65' (yellow card) 66' | (Report) | Pejic 45' (o.g.); Byers 63'; Sebrango 89' |

Swangard Stadium
Burnaby, British Columbia
Attendance: 5,886
Referee: Carol Anne Chenard (CAN)
October 17, 2009
2:30 PM EDT

| Montreal Impact | 3–1 | Vancouver Whitecaps FC |
|---|---|---|
| Donatelli 30' (pen.); Gjertsen 40'; Brown 42' | (Report) | Bellsomo (yellow card) 21'; Pejic (red card) 29'; Toure 44'; Moose (yellow card) 56' |

Saputo Stadium
Montreal, Quebec
Attendance: 13,034
Referee: Dave Gantar

Montreal Impact won 6–3 on aggregate.

USL First Division
2009 Champions
(Canada)
Montreal Impact
Second title

=== Awards and All-League teams ===
First Team
F: (Canada) Charles Gbeke (Vancouver Whitecaps) (Leading Goalscorer); (Guinea) Keita Mandjou (Portland Timbers); (Liberia) Johnny Menyongar (Rochester Rhinos)
M: (United States) Daniel Paladini (Carolina RailHawks); (United States) Ryan Pore (Portland Timbers); (Mexico) Ricardo Sánchez (Minnesota Thunder)
D: (United States) Nelson Akwari (Charleston Battery); Cristian Arrieta (Puerto Rico Islanders) (MVP & Defender of the Year); (United States) Matt Bobo (Charleston Battery); (United States) David Hayes (Portland Timbers)
G: (United States) Steve Cronin (Portland Timbers) (Goalkeeper of the Year)
Coach: (New Zealand) Gavin Wilkinson (Portland Timbers) (Coach of the Year)

Second Team
F: (Saint Vincent and the Grenadines) Marlon James (Vancouver Whitecaps); (England) Eddie Johnson (Austin Aztex)
M: (Canada) Martin Nash (Vancouver Whitecaps); (Kenya) Lawrence Olum (Minnesota Thunder); (Northern Ireland) Jonathan Steele (Puerto Rico Islanders); (United States) David Testo (Montreal Impact)
D: (Jamaica) Stephen DeRoux (Montreal Impact); (New Zealand) Cameron Knowles (Portland Timbers); John Krause (Puerto Rico Islanders); (United States) Mark Schulte (Carolina RailHawks)
G: Bill Gaudette (Puerto Rico Islanders)

== Second Division ==
USL Second Division
- Season: 2009
- Champions: Richmond Kickers (3rd Title)
- Regular Season title: Wilmington Hammerheads (1st Title)
- Matches: 90
- Goals: 252 (2.8 per match)
- Average goals/game: 2.80
- Best player: (United States) Jamie Watson, Wilmington Hammerheads
- Top goalscorer: (United States) Jamie Watson, Wilmington Hammerheads (30 Points) (England) Matthew Delicate, Richmond Kickers (13 goals)
- Best goalkeeper: (United States) Ronnie Pascale, Richmond Kickers
- Biggest home win: 6–0 (Charlotte vs. Bermuda)
- Biggest away win: 6–3 (Wilmington @ Charlotte); 3–0 (Charlotte @ Real Maryland)
- Highest scoring: 7–2 (Richmond vs Bermuda); 6–3 (Wilmington @ Charlotte)
- Longest winning run: 5 (Wilmington)
- Longest unbeaten run: 6 (Richmond)
- Longest losing run: 5 (Bermuda)
- Highest attendance: 4,010 (Richmond)
- Lowest attendance: 200 (Bermuda)
- Average attendance: 1,686

=== Regular season ===
==== Standings ====
USL Second Division
| Pos | Team | Pld | W | L | T | GF | GA | GD | Pts | Qualification |
|---|---|---|---|---|---|---|---|---|---|---|
| 1 | Wilmington Hammerheads | 20 | 12 | 5 | 3 | 42 | 24 | +18 | 39 | Regular season champion |
| 2 | Richmond Kickers (C) | 20 | 11 | 3 | 6 | 39 | 18 | +21 | 39 | Playoff spot clinched |
| 3 | Harrisburg City Islanders | 20 | 9 | 7 | 4 | 31 | 23 | +8 | 31 | Playoff spot clinched |
| 4 | Charlotte Eagles | 20 | 8 | 5 | 7 | 40 | 28 | +12 | 31 | Playoff spot clinched |
| 5 | Real Maryland Monarchs | 20 | 8 | 10 | 2 | 22 | 31 | −9 | 26 | Playoff spot clinched |
| 6 | Crystal Palace Baltimore | 20 | 6 | 9 | 5 | 16 | 20 | −4 | 23 | |
| 7 | Western Mass Pioneers | 20 | 6 | 9 | 5 | 21 | 34 | −13 | 23 | |
| 8 | Pittsburgh Riverhounds | 20 | 6 | 10 | 4 | 18 | 27 | −9 | 22 | |
| 9 | Bermuda Hogges | 20 | 4 | 12 | 4 | 19 | 43 | −24 | 16 | |

(C) Playoff Champion

==== Results ====
Abbreviation and Color Key: Bermuda Hogges – BMU • Charlotte Eagles – CHA • Crystal Palace Baltimore – CPB Harrisburg City Islanders – HAR • Pittsburgh Riverhounds – PIT • Real Maryland Monarchs – RMM Richmond Kickers – RIC • Western Mass Pioneers – WMA • Wilmington Hammerheads – WIL Home • Away • Win • Loss • Tie
| Club | Match | | | | | | | | | | | | | | | | | | | |
| Club | 1 | 2 | 3 | 4 | 5 | 6 | 7 | 8 | 9 | 10 | 11 | 12 | 13 | 14 | 15 | 16 | 17 | 18 | 19 | 20 |
|---|---|---|---|---|---|---|---|---|---|---|---|---|---|---|---|---|---|---|---|---|
| Bermuda Hogges | CPB | RMM | HAR | RIC | WIL | WIL | RMM | WIL | CHA | PIT | HAR | CPB | WMA | PIT | PIT | RIC | WMA | WMA | CHA | RMM |
| Bermuda Hogges | 2–0 | 3–2 | 2–1 | 1–0 | 0–0 | 0–1 | 1–0 | 1–0 | 6–0 | 1–0 | 3–0 | 1–2 | 2–2 | 1–2 | 1–0 | 7–2 | 5–0 | 2–2 | 1–1 | 4–3 |
| Charlotte Eagles | WIL | CPB | WIL | RIC | CPB | HAR | PIT | BMU | WMA | RIC | HAR | WIL | RIC | WMA | RMM | RMM | CPB | BMU | PIT | WMA |
| Charlotte Eagles | 2–2 | 0–2 | 3–6 | 1–1 | 1–2 | 3–0 | 5–1 | 6–0 | 2–0 | 2–2 | 0–0 | 2–3 | 3–0 | 5–0 | 1–1 | 0–3 | 0–0 | 1–1 | 1–3 | 3–0 |
| Crystal Palace Baltimore | PIT | BMU | CHA | WIL | RMM | WMA | CHA | RIC | WMA | RMM | WMA | WIL | BMU | RMM | HAR | HAR | RIC | CHA | HAR | PIT |
| Crystal Palace Baltimore | 0–0 | 2–0 | 0–2 | 3–0 | 2–0 | 1–0 | 1–2 | 1–1 | 0–0 | 0–1 | 2–1 | 2–1 | 1–2 | 0–1 | 3–1 | 2–0 | 1–2 | 0–0 | 0–0 | 1–0 |
| Harrisburg City Islanders | RIC | WMA | BMU | PIT | PIT | CHA | RMM | RIC | BMU | RMM | CHA | WIL | CPB | CPB | PIT | WIL | RIC | RMM | CPB | WMA |
| Harrisburg City Islanders | 2–2 | 3–1 | 2–1 | 3–0 | 0–1 | 3–0 | 2–3 | 5–0 | 3–0 | 4–0 | 0–0 | 3–2 | 3–1 | 2–0 | 1–0 | 1–2 | 0–1 | 0–0 | 0–0 | 2–1 |
| Pittsburgh Riverhounds | CPB | RIC | RMM | HAR | HAR | CHA | WIL | BMU | RIC | WMA | RIC | BMU | BMU | RMM | HAR | WMA | WMA | WIL | CHA | CPB |
| Pittsburgh Riverhounds | 0–0 | 1–1 | 2–1 | 3–0 | 0–1 | 5–1 | 1–3 | 1–0 | 0–2 | 0–0 | 1–2 | 1–2 | 1–0 | 2–1 | 1–0 | 1–1 | 3–0 | 0–2 | 1–3 | 1–0 |
| Real Maryland Monarchs | BMU | PIT | CPB | WMA | BMU | CPB | HAR | WMA | RIC | HAR | WIL | CPB | PIT | WIL | CHA | CHA | RIC | HAR | BMU | WIL |
| Real Maryland Monarchs | 3–2 | 2–1 | 2–0 | 3–0 | 1–0 | 0–1 | 2–3 | 2–0 | 1–0 | 4–0 | 3–0 | 0–1 | 2–1 | 3–1 | 1–1 | 0–3 | 1–0 | 0–0 | 4–3 | 2–0 |
| Richmond Kickers | HAR | RIC | WMA | BMU | CHA | CPB | WMA | HAR | RMM | PIT | CHA | PIT | CHA | BMU | CPB | WIL | HAR | RMM | WIL | WIL |
| Richmond Kickers | 2–2 | 1–1 | 0–2 | 1–0 | 1–1 | 1–1 | 2–0 | 5–0 | 1–0 | 0–2 | 2–2 | 1–2 | 3–0 | 7–2 | 1–2 | 3–2 | 0–1 | 1–0 | 0–1 | 2–2 |
| Western Mass Pioneers | HAR | RIC | CPB | RMM | WIL | CPB | RIC | CPB | RMM | CHA | PIT | BMU | WIL | CHA | BMU | BMU | PIT | PIT | HAR | CHA |
| Western Mass Pioneers | 3–1 | 0–2 | 1–0 | 3–0 | 2–1 | 0–0 | 2–0 | 2–1 | 2–0 | 2–0 | 0–0 | 2–2 | 4–0 | 5–0 | 5–0 | 2–2 | 1–1 | 3–0 | 2–1 | 3–0 |
| Wilmington Hammerheads | CHA | CPB | CHA | BMU | BMU | WMA | PIT | BMU | CPB | RMM | HAR | CHA | WMA | RMM | RIC | HAR | PIT | RIC | RMM | RIC |
| Wilmington Hammerheads | 2–2 | 3–0 | 3–6 | 0–0 | 0–1 | 2–1 | 1–3 | 1–0 | 2–1 | 0–3 | 3–2 | 2–3 | 4–0 | 3–1 | 3–2 | 1–2 | 0–2 | 0–1 | 2–0 | 2–2 |

=== Playoffs ===
Quarterfinals
4 | Charlotte Eagles | 3
5 | Real Maryland Monarchs | 1

Semifinals
1 | Wilmington Hammerheads | 0
4 | Charlotte Eagles | 1
2 | Richmond Kickers (AET) | 1
3 | Harrisburg City Islanders | 0

Final
2 | Richmond Kickers | 3
4 | Charlotte Eagles | 1

==== First round ====
August 19, 2009

| Charlotte Eagles | 3–1 | Real Maryland Monarchs |
|---|---|---|
| Herrera 4' (pen.); Swinehart 16'; Bentos 90' (yellow card) 90+' | Report | Brooks 83' (yellow card) 54' (yellow-red card) 90+'; Lewis (yellow card) 68'; King (yellow card) 89'; Funicello (red card) 90' |

Restart Field
Charlotte, North Carolina
Attendance: 760
Referee: Mark Kadlecik (United States)

==== Semifinals ====
August 22, 2009
7:00 PM EDT

| Richmond Kickers | 1 – 0 (AET) | Harrisburg City Islanders |
|---|---|---|
| Worthen (yellow card) 33'; Hunter (yellow card) 117'; Delicâte 120' | (Report) | Baker (yellow card) 43'; Velten (yellow card) 63' |

University of Richmond Stadium, Richmond, Virginia
Attendance: 1,923
Referee: Mike Andrews (United States)

August 22, 2009
7:00 PM EDT

| Wilmington Hammerheads | 0–1 | Charlotte Eagles |
|---|---|---|
| Watson (yellow card) 36' | (Report) | Williams (yellow card) 61'; Herrera (yellow card) 62'; Swinehart (yellow card) 80'; Bentos 85' |

Legion Stadium, Wilmington, North Carolina
Attendance: 2,783
Referee: Dan Fitzgerald (United States)

==== Final ====
August 29, 2009
8:00 PM EDT

| Richmond Kickers | 3–1 | Charlotte Eagles |
|---|---|---|
| Elcock 63'; DiRaimondo 83'; Bulow 86' (pen.) | (Report) | Martins 14'; Nunes (yellow card) 41'; Williams (yellow card) 46'; Ceus (yellow card) 85' |

University of Richmond Stadium, Richmond, Virginia
Attendance: 2,991
Referee: Tony Russo (United States)

=== Awards and All-League team ===
First Team
F: (England) Matthew Delicâte (Richmond Kickers), (United States) Jamie Watson (WIL) (MVP)
M: (South Africa) Ty Shipalane (HAR), (United States) Kenny Bundy (WIL), (United States) Mike Burke (RIC), (Colombia) Jorge Herrera (CHA)
D: (United States) Dustin Bixler (HAR), (United States) John Borrajo (RMD), (Japan) Shintaro Harada (CPB), (Cameroon) Yomby William (RIC) (Defender of the Year)
G: (United States) Ronnie Pascale (RIC) (Goalkeeper of the Year)
Coach: (England) David Irving (WIL)
Rookie of the Year: (South Africa) Ty Shipalane, HAR

Second Team
F: (Cape Verde) Almir Barbosa (WMA), (Bermuda) Damico Coddington (BER), (United States) Chad Severs (HAR)
M: (United States) Justin Evans (PIT), (United States) Jamie Franks (WIL), (Brazil) Amaury Nunes (CHA), (Portugal) Val Teixeira (CPB)
D: (Republic of Ireland) Colin Falvey (WIL), (Germany) Sascha Gorres (RIC), (United States) Andrew Marshall (CPB)
G: (United States) Chase Harrison (HAR)
