= 2013 USASA Region III National Cup =

Tournament details
- Country: United States
- Teams: 9

Final positions
- Champions: North Texas Rayados
- Runner-up: Red Force

Tournament statistics
- Matches played: 12

The 2013 USASA Region III National Cup is a qualifying tournament that will determine which clubs from the third region of the United States Adult Soccer Association qualify for the first round proper of the 2013 U.S. Open Cup. The Region III National Cup's group matches took place on 12–13 April 2013 with the semifinals taking place on 14 April 2013.

== Qualification ==
- ASC New Stars (Texas South)
- Barracudas FC (Texas South)
- Motagua New Orleans (Louisiana)
- Dallas TNT (North Texas)
- FC Rahr (North Texas)
- Islanders FC (Texas South)
- Los Lobos (Oklahoma)
- NTX Rayados (North Texas)
- Red Force (Florida)

== Group Phase ==
=== Group A ===
Team	Pld	W	D	L	GF	GA	GD	Pts
(Louisiana) C. D. Motagua	2	2	0	0	13	2	+11	6
(Texas) ASC New Stars	2	1	0	1	4	2	+2	3
(Texas) Dallas TNT	2	0	0	2	1	14	-13	0

12 April 2013
17:00

ASC New Stars	3–0	Dallas TNT

New Orleans City Park Festival Grounds

13 April 2013
08:30

Dallas TNT	1–11	C.D. Motagua

New Orleans City Park Festival Grounds

13 April 2013
16:30

C.D. Motagua	2–1	ASC New Stars

New Orleans City Park Festival Grounds

=== Group B ===
Team	Pld	W	D	L	GF	GA	GD	Pts
(Texas) NTX Rayados	2	2	0	0	10	2	+8	6
(Texas) Islanders FC	2	1	0	1	5	8	-3	3
(Oklahoma) Los Lobos	2	0	0	2	3	8	-5	0

12 April 2013
17:00

Islanders FC	1–6	NTX Rayados

New Orleans City Park Festival Grounds

13 April 2013
08:30

NTX Rayados	4–1	Los Lobos

New Orleans City Park Festival Grounds

13 April 2013
16:30

Los Lobos	2–4	Islanders FC

New Orleans City Park Festival Grounds

=== Group C ===
Team	Pld	W	D	L	GF	GA	GD	Pts
(Florida) Red Force	2	2	0	0	5	1	+4	6
(Texas) Barracudas FC	2	0	1	1	4	5	-1	1
(Texas) FC Rahr	2	0	1	1	3	6	-3	1

12 April 2013
19:30

Red Force	2–1	Barracudas FC

New Orleans City Park Festival Grounds

13 April 2013
10:30

Barracudas FC	3–3	FC Rahr

New Orleans City Park Festival Grounds

13 April 2013
18:30

FC Rahr	0–3	Red Force

New Orleans City Park Festival Grounds

=== Ranking of 2nd Place Teams ===
Team	Pld	W	D	L	GF	GA	GD	Pts
(Texas) ASC New Stars	2	1	0	1	4	2	+2	3
(Texas) Islanders FC	2	1	0	1	5	8	-3	3
(Texas) Barracudas FC	2	0	1	1	4	5	-1	1

== Knockout phase ==
Semi-finals
C. D. Motagua	0
NTX Rayados	4
ASC New Stars	0
Red Force	2

Finals
NTX Rayados	3
Red Force	0

14 April 2013
08:30

C. D. Motagua	0–4	NTX Rayados

New Orleans City Park Festival Grounds

14 April 2013
08:30

ASC New Stars	0–2	Red Force

New Orleans City Park Festival Grounds

14 April 2013
14:00

Red Force	0–3	NTX Rayados

New Orleans City Park Festival Grounds

== See also ==
- 2013 U.S. Open Cup
- 2013 U.S. Open Cup qualification
- United States Adult Soccer Association
