= Johan Claesson =

Swedish footballer

Personal information
- Full name: Johan Claesson
- Date of birth: August 12, 1981 (age 45)
- Place of birth: Uppsala, Sweden
- Height: 5 ft 10 in (1.78 m)
- Position: Midfielder

Youth career
- Hagby IK

Senior career*
Years	Team	Apps	(Gls)
1999–2004	IK Sirius	98	(0)
2005–2008	Gefle IF	97	(3)
2009–2010	Portland Timbers	40	(1)
2011–2013	IK Sirius	27	(2)
- * Club domestic league appearances and goals as of November 23, 2013

Johan Claesson (born August 12, 1981) is a Swedish retired footballer who last played for IK Sirius in the Swedish Division 1 Norra.

== Career ==
=== Sweden ===
Claesson began his career as part of the youth team at Hagby IK, before moving to IK Sirius, where he played until 2005.

Claesson moved to Gefle IF in 2005, and spent four years with the team. Initially used as a substitute, he eventually won a first team spot, and went on to make almost 100 appearances for the club in the Allsvenskan, scoring three goals.

=== United States ===
In December 2008 Claesson signed a one-year contract with the Portland Timbers of the USL First Division with the option of a second year. He played 23 games and scored 1 goal in his debut season with the Timbers, and proved to be an important part of the team's midfield, helping them to the 2009 USL-1 regular season title.

=== Comeback in IK Sirius ===
In December 2010 Claesson signed for his old club IK Sirius in the Swedish third tier.

== Honors ==
=== Portland Timbers ===
- USL First Division Commissioner's Cup (1): 2009
