= Gulf Coast Premier League =

Soccer league

- Founded: 2014; 12 years ago
- Country: United States
- Confederation: CONCACAF
- Number of clubs: 20 (Note: With some clubs fielding teams in multiple leagues.)
- Domestic cup: U.S. Open Cup
- Current champions: Alabama FC South (2024)
- Most championships: Motagua New Orleans (3 titles)
- Website: gcplsoccer.com

The Gulf Coast Premier League (GCPL) is a United States Adult Soccer Association affiliated Amateur Elite League that includes teams from Alabama, Florida, Georgia, Louisiana, and Mississippi. The regular season of the GCPL runs May through July. On August 13, 2020, it was announced that the GCPL would be the first "amateur league affiliation" of the National Independent Soccer Association after Gaffa FC and Louisiana Krewe FC competed in the NISA 2020 Independent Cup.

== Louisiana Premier League ==
The Louisiana Premier League was formed in 2014 by the Louisiana Soccer Association's Adult Committee members, Jonathan Rednour and Chad Vidrine, with the assistance of Pool Boys FC founder, Jeremy Poklemba. The recent success of a similar formatted competition, administered by the LSA, in the spring of 2014 and the emergence of newly formed clubs, Pool Boys FC and Cajun Soccer Club, along with the interest from Motagua New Orleans from the ISLANO league, offered an opportunity to create a statewide elite amateur league. Motagua New Orleans won the inaugural season, defeating Cajun Soccer Club in the finals, 4–2.

On March 8, 2016, the Louisiana Premier League was granted Elite Amateur League status by the United States Adult Soccer Association.

== Gulf Coast Premier League ==
On August 1, 2016, the Louisiana Premier League, sanctioned and operated by the Louisiana Soccer Association, folded to make way for the newly formed Gulf Coast Premier League. The league formed as a non-profit organization expanding itself to clubs outside Louisiana along the gulf coast.

In January 2017 the league announced three expansion teams, expanding the league footprint into Alabama and Florida. Central Texas Lobos FC were also announced as a future member in June 2017.

The Gulf Coast Premier League organization currently operates three separate leagues - Premier League, League Two, and the Women's League. Each league is split into conferences for schedule balance, and to manage travel expenses.

Starting with the 2025 season, GCPL will play as conferences in affiliated leagues. The men's Premier division will play in the League for Clubs (denoted on the team table as "Premier"), and the women's division will play in the WPSL (denoted on the team table as "Women's:). Second division teams will compete separately, under the GCPL banner.

=== Developmental League ===
A 4-team developmental league called the Gulf Coast Development League (GCDL) was announced and began play in May 2019.

=== 2020 Fall Tournament Showcase ===
The League announced it would cancel its 2020 regular season due to the coronavirus epidemic but left open the possibility of a fall competition. In October 2020 the League announced the Fall Tournament Showcase featuring five teams: Pool Boys FC, Louisiana Krewe FC, Crescent City FC, Mobile United FC and new addition 14th Ward FC.

== Great Plains Premier League ==
In 2019, the GCPL announced the creation of the Great Plains Premier League (GPPL), an expansion conference/sister league with teams to be based in the Dakotas, Nebraska, Iowa, Kansas or Missouri. The GPPL was set to begin play in 2020 however the COVID-19 pandemic halted plans. Nebraska Bugeaters FC, was their only announced club.

== Teams ==
Club	City	Stadium	Founded	Inaugural season
BRSC Capitals - Premier, Women's	Baton Rouge, Louisiana	Olympia Stadium	2016	2017
Cajun Rush - Women's	Lafayette, Louisiana	LUS Fiber Stadium	2014	2014
Central Louisiana FC (known as Alexandria Pool Boys FC until 2023) - Premier, League Two	Alexandria, Louisiana	Wildcat Field at Louisiana Christian University	2013	2014
Gulf Coast United - Premier, Women's	Gulfport, Mississippi	Herbert Wilson Stadium	2003	2021
Hattiesburg FC - Women's	Hattiesburg, Mississippi		2003	2019
Louisiana Krewe II - Premier	Lafayette, Louisiana	LUS Fiber Field	2013	2014
Mississippi Blues SC - League Two, Women's	Clinton, Mississippi	Freedom Ridge Park Stadium		2018
Pensacola FC - Men's and (U19) Premier, Women's	Pensacola, Florida	Ashton Brosnaham Stadium	2017	2017
Shreveport United - Premier, Women's	Shreveport, Louisiana	Cargill Park	2016	2018
Tallahassee SC - Premier	Tallahassee, FL	Gene Cox Stadium	2019	2019, 2025
Union 10 FC - Premier, Women's	Daphne, Alabama	Al Trione Complex	2022	2023
Valdosta FC - Premier	Valdosta, Georgia	North Lowndes Park	2024	2025

=== Former Teams ===
- Alabama FC South (Montgomery, AL) (2024, moved to USL League Two as Montgomery United)
- Aspire FC II (Pineville, LA) (2023)
- BOCA FC (Shreveport, AL) (2015–2019)
- Crescent City FC (New Orleans, LA) (2021–2023, on hiatus)
- Central Texas Lobos FC (Buda, TX) (2018–2023, moved to USL League Two as Hill Country Lobos)
- Florida Roots (Panama City, FL) (2020-2022, 2024, on hiatus)
- Gulf Coast Rangers FC (Fairhope, AL) (2017–2023, merged with Mobile United FC to form Union 10 FC.
- Lake City Gamblers (Lake Charles, LA) (2014–2017)
- Louisiana Fire (New Orleans, LA) (2016–2017)
- Louisiana Krewe FC (Lafayette, LA) (2018–2021, moved to USL League Two)
- Mobile United FC (Mobile, AL) (2021–2022, merged with Gulf Coast Rangers FC to form Union 10 FC.
- Motagua New Orleans (New Orleans, LA) (2014–2019)
- FC New Orleans (New Orleans, LA) (2019)
- New Orleans United (New Orleans, LA) (2021)
- Northshore United (Covington, LA) (2017–2021)
- Nicholls State University Club (Thibodaux, LA) (2014–2015)
- Mississippi Blues FC (Jackson, MS) (2018–2020)
- Pensacola Bay United (Pensacola, FL) (2022-2024, on hiatus)
- Port City FC (Gulfport, MS) (2016–2019, moved to National Premier Soccer League)
- Rad FC (Destin, FL) (2023)
- Real United Riverhawks FC (Moss Point, LA) (2018)
- Red River FC (Minden, LA) (2021)
- Shreveport Rafters FC B (Shreveport, LA) (2016–2017))

== Champions ==
Ed.	Season	Winner	Runner-up	Highest goalscorer	
1	2014–15	Motagua New Orleans (1)	Cajun SC	Steven Morris (Motagua New Orleans)	12
2	2015–16	Motagua New Orleans (2)	Boca Knights FC	Joel Amos (Lake City Gamblers) Leonardo Ferriera de Barros (Motagua New Orleans)	6
3	2016–17	Motagua New Orleans (3)	Shreveport Rafters FC B	Reece Wilson (Motagua New Orleans)	18
4	2017	Gaffa FC (1)	Cajun SC	Vasbert Ledger (Cajun SC)	9
5	2018	Port City FC (1)	Cajun SC	Quesi Weston (BOCA FC)	16
6	2019	FC New Orleans (1)	Northshore United	Roger Llergo (FC New Orleans) Adrian Olivares Rodriguez (Louisiana Krewe); Oscar Saavedra (Central Texas Lobos FC)	9
–	2020	(season not disputed due to Covid-19 pandemic)			
7	2021	Louisiana Krewe FC (1)	Gulf Coast Rangers	Quesi Weston (Louisiana Krewe)	11
8	2022	Gaffa FC (1)	Shreveport United		
9	2023	Southern States SC II (1)	Central Texas Lobos FC		
10	2024	Alabama FC South (1)	Gaffa FC	Matthew Reed (Southern States) Hector Moreno (Sowegans)	
11	2025	Central Louisiana FC (1)	BRSC Capitals		
12	2026	Central Louisiana FC (2)	BRSC Capitals		
