= Hill Country Lobos =

- Full name: Hill Country Lobos Soccer Club
- Nickname: Lobos
- Founded: January 1, 2016; 10 years ago
- Ground: Bob Shelton Stadium; Buda, Texas
- Capacity: 8,800
- Owner: David R. Walding
- Head Coach: Jonas Hunt
- League: USL League Two
- 2024: 6th, Lonestar Division; Playoffs: DNQ
- Website: hillcountry-soccer.com
Home colours

Hill Country Lobos, is an American soccer team based in Central Texas competing in the Lonestar Division of USL League Two, a pre-professional league that is part of the United Soccer League system.

Prior to joining USL League 2, the club was known as Central Texas Lobos and played in the Gulf Coast Premier League. The Lobos' regular kit colors are purple, pink, and white. The Lobos are based in Austin, Texas and play home games in the nearby town of Buda, Texas.

== History ==
=== Pre USL history ===
In the summer of 2016, the Lobos' team owner, David Walding, announced the franchise would join the Texas Premier Soccer League for the 2016–17 season. In the Lobos' inaugural season, the club won the Texas Cup title. However, following the 2017 season, the Lobos withdrew from the TPSL and joined the Gulf Coast Premier League. The Central Texas Lobos also entered the 2018 Lamar Hunt U.S. Open Cup qualification round.

In early 2019, it was announced that the Lobos would be moving to a new permanent 4 acre practice facility in South Austin. The club also added a youth academy, and operates a club (Academy Paraiso) that is part of the third division in Honduras.

=== USL League Two era ===
In 2023, plans were announced for the club to rebrand as Hill Country Lobos and join USL League Two. The following year, the Lobos were grouped in the Lonestar Division and announced former Honduras national under-20 football team coach Luis Alvarado as head coach for their 2024 USL League Two season. The Lobos finished 6th in the Lonestar Division, recording their first win at the League Two level against Houston FC in a 4-1 home victory.

== Sponsorship ==
Period	Kit manufacturer	Shirt sponsor	Other sponsors
2024	Anemi	Z'Tejas	Hays Co. Outfitters
2025	Anemi	Z'Tejas	Gus's World Famous Fried Chicken, Hays Co. Outfitters, Remixers
2026	Anemi	—	Over The Moon, Electrolit

== Players and Staff ==
=== Current technical staff ===
Position	Name
Technical Director	(Honduras) Luis Alvarado
Head coach	(Spain) Jonas Hunt
Assistant coach	(Mexico) César Santos

=== 2026 Roster ===
As of June 1, 2026 Note: Flags indicate national team as defined under FIFA eligibility rules; some limited exceptions apply. Players may hold more than one non-FIFA nationality.

No.	Pos.	Nation	Player
0	GK	USA	Fabian Enriquez
1	GK	NCA	Jeferson Ordoñez
2	DF	USA	Baden Arrieta
3	DF	USA	Vicenzo Quezada
4	DF	CAN	Luc Finelli
5	MF	CAN	Alessandro Ferrin
6	DF	CAN	Jake McConnery
7	DF	USA	Aidan Phelan
8	MF	USA	Diego Rocha
9	FW	USA	Bryan Arellano
10	MF	RSA	Keaviano Francis
11	MF	HON	Denis Ariola
12	MF	MEX	Santiago Ruiz
13	DF	USA	Xavier Menefeld

No.	Pos.	Nation	Player
14	FW	ESP	Aran Hernandez
16	DF	ESP	Oriol Gazquez
17	DF	USA	Maxwell White
18	MF	USA	Jorge Rocha
19	FW	USA	Cameron Rothgeb
20	DF	USA	AJ Valdivia
21	MF	USA	Danny Kern III
23	MF	USA	Joseph Reyes
25	MF	HON	Alex Gamero
26	DF	USA	Brandon Khron
27	MF	CAN	Neshawn Sutherland
28	MF	SCO	Sean Borland
55	MF	USA	Jommar Reyes

== Statistics ==
Games
Rank	Player	Years	Games Played	Minutes
1	(Ghana) Rockshell Antwi	2024 -	20	1,810
1	(Honduras) Michael Quintanilla	2024 -	20	1,620
3	(Honduras) Samuel Alvarez	2024 -	18	1,309
4	(United States) Aidan Phelan	2024 -	16	1,390
5	(Canada) Luc Finelli	2025 -	12	1,075
5	(Canada) Edwin Espinal	2025 -	12	1,061
5	(Belgium) Kimia Kassanda	2025 -	12	919
5	(Honduras) Rolando Isai	2024 -	12	877
5	(El Salvador) Brian Franco	2025	8	630
5	(Honduras) Wilmer Irias	2024	12	559

Goals
Rank	Player	Years	Goals Scored
1	(Honduras) Michael Quintanilla	2024 -	18
2	(United States) Raven Littles	2025 -	6
3	(Canada) Edwin Espinal	2025 -	4

=== USL League 2 ===
Season	League	Conference	Division	Regular season								Position			Playoffs	USOC	Top goalscorer(s)	Goals
Season	League	Conference	Division	GP	W	L	D	GF	GA	GD	Pts	Div.	Conf.	Overall	Playoffs	USOC	Top goalscorer(s)	Goals
2024	USL2	Southern	Lone Star	12	1	9	2	21	46	-25	5	6th	29th	121st	DNQ	1st QR	(Honduras) Michael Quintanilla	9
2025	USL2	Southern	Lone Star	12	3	7	2	26	30	-4	11	7th	27th	104th	DNQ		(Honduras) Michael Quintanilla	9
2026	USL2	Southern	Lone Star	12	2	3	7	23	35	-12	9	7th			DNQ			
Total				36	6	19	11	70	111	-41	25	-	-	-	-	-	(Honduras) Michael Quintanilla	18

=== Gulf Coast Premier League ===
Season	League	Division	Regular season							Position		Playoffs	U.S. Open Cup
Season	League	Division	GP	W	L	D	GF	GA	Pts	Div.	Overall	Playoffs	U.S. Open Cup
2017	TPSL	N/A	8	3	2	3	19	11	12	N/A	4th	DNQ	DNE
2018	GCPL	West	10	3	7	0	10	31	9	4th	12th	DNQ	1st Qualifying Round
2019	GCPL	West	10	3	6	1	19	24	10	5th	14th	DNQ	DNE
2020	GCPL	West	Season cancelled due to COVID-19 pandemic										1st Qualifying Round
2021	GCPL	West	Information not available										DNE
2022	GCPL	West	9	3	4	2	22	17	11	3rd	5th	Quarterfinals	DNE
2023	GCPL	West	7	6	0	1	18	8	19	1st	4th	2nd Place	DNE

== Awards and honors ==
- Gulf Coast Premier League
  - Runners-up: 2023
- Texas Cup
  - Champions: 2017
