= Ronnie Pascale =

American soccer player

Personal information
- Full name: Ronnie Pascale
- Date of birth: September 5, 1976 (age 50)
- Place of birth: North Salem, New York, U.S.
- Height: 5 ft 11 in (1.80 m)
- Position: Goalkeeper

Youth career
- 1995–1998: Furman Paladins

Senior career*
Years	Team	Apps	(Gls)
1999	Atlanta Silverbacks	2	(0)
2000–2012	Richmond Kickers	273	(0)
2016	Richmond Kickers	0	(0)
2018	Richmond Kickers	0	(0)

Managerial career
- 2002–2007: VCU Rams (assistant)
- 2012: Richmond Kickers (assistant)
- * Club domestic league appearances and goals as of 20:17, 15 October 2018 (UTC)

Ronnie Pascale (born September 5, 1976) is an American retired soccer player.

== Career ==
=== Youth and college ===
Pascale played college soccer at Furman University from 1995 to 1998. In his rookie season he was named the Southern Conference Rookie of the Year, and went on to be named to the Southern All-Conference team four times, Conference Goalkeeper of the year three times, and was twice named to the 2nd team All-South. He was also named the Furman Male Athlete of the Year in his senior year.

=== Professional ===
Pascale turned professional in 1999 when he was drafted by Atlanta Silverbacks in the second round of the 1999 A-League draft, and played two games in his rookie season as backup to first choice goalkeeper Bo Oshoniyi, before moving on to Richmond Kickers in 2000.

Pascale has been ever-present for the Kickers since then, and has been the team's first choice goalkeeper since 2002. He was the Supporter's Choice MVP in both 2003 and 2004, Player's Choice MVP in 2005, and was USL2 Goalkeeper of the Year in 2006 with a league-low goals against average of 0.99. He was also part of the Kickers team which won the USL Second Division championships in 2006 and 2009. On February 3, 2010, Richmond announced the re-signing of Pascale for the 2010 season.

Pascale re-signed with the club for the 2011 season on January 6, 2011. The club announced that 2011 would be his final season as a player. He reached the milestone of 250 league games for the Kickers on May 25, 2011, lining up between the posts in a game against Orlando City.

Richmond signed Pascale as a player and assistant coach for the 2012 season on February 13, 2012.

Pascale announced his retirement on November 15, 2012.

In 2016, Pascale briefly came back from retirement to become the backup goalkeeper for the Richmond Kickers.

=== Coaching ===
In addition to his playing career, Pascale was the goalkeeper coach at Virginia Commonwealth University, Richmond, Virginia from 2002 to 2007.

== Honors ==
=== Richmond Kickers ===
- USL Second Division Champions (1):
- 2009
