= Alex Nimo =

American soccer player (born 1990)

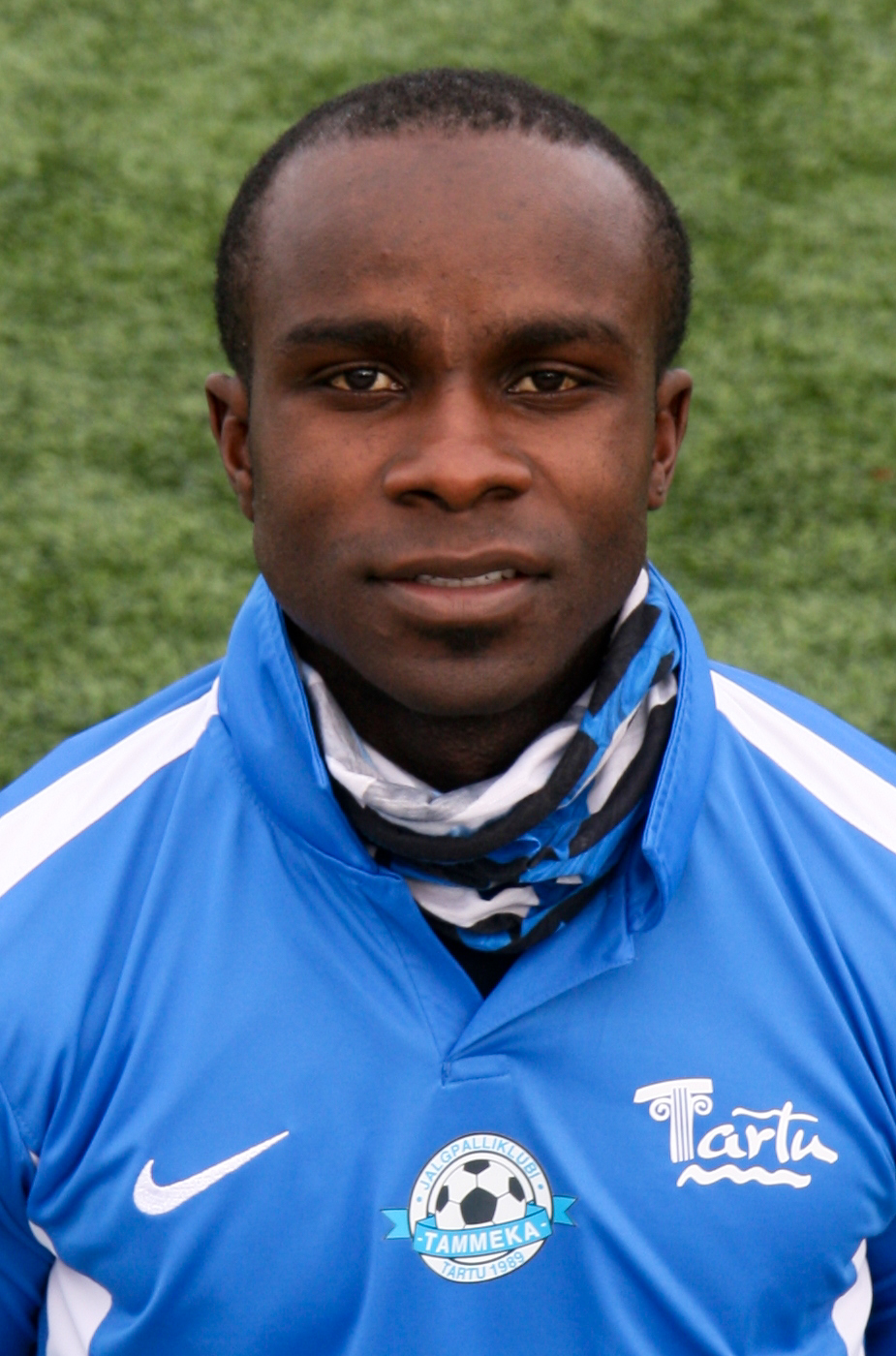

Personal information
- Full name: Alexander Frank Nimo
- Date of birth: March 21, 1990 (age 36)
- Place of birth: Monrovia, Liberia
- Height: 5 ft 5 in (1.65 m)
- Position: Winger

Youth career
- 2006: F.C. Portland Soccer Academy
- 2007: IMG Soccer Academy

Senior career*
Years	Team	Apps	(Gls)
2008–2010	Real Salt Lake	0	(0)
2009–2010	→ Portland Timbers (loan)	45	(1)
2012	Tammeka	29	(4)

International career
2007–2008	United States U17	16	(1)
2008–2009	United States U20	6	(2)
- * Club domestic league appearances and goals

Alexander Frank Nimo (born March 21, 1990) is a former soccer player. Born in Liberia, he represented the United States at youth level.

== Early life ==
Alex moved with his parents, Tommy and Maima Nimo, to a refugee camp in Ghana as an infant. There he spent most of the first nine years of his life as the family escaped from the First Liberian Civil War. Nimo and his family were granted asylum as political refugees and moved to Oregon with the assistance of Catholic Ministries. In Oregon, he was discovered by the late University of Portland soccer coach Clive Charles and placed in F.C. Portland.

== Career ==
=== Youth ===
In 2003, Nimo was chosen for the player pool of the under-14 U.S. national team. The 5 ft 5 in (1.65 m) midfielder attended Benson Polytechnic High School in Portland, and was a two-time all-state forward. He was considered one of the best players to ever come out of Oregon. He was named a Parade All-American, and all-state at Benson. Nimo received his U.S. citizenship in November 2006. In 2007, he joined the U.S. Residency camp located in Bradenton, Florida, and played for the U-17 national team.

=== Professional ===
In the 2008 MLS SuperDraft, Nimo—who had already been signed by the league to a Generation Adidas contract worth $45,000 per year—was selected 17th overall by Real Salt Lake. He scored his first goal for the team on July 9, 2008, in an exhibition game against Santos Laguna, but would not see any league appearances during the season. Shortly before the opening of the 2009 season, in March, the club announced that Nimo would be loaned out to the Portland Timbers of the USL First Division. He was loaned to the Timbers again for the 2010 season.

It was announced on November 18, 2010, that Nimo would graduate from the MLS Generation Adidas program at the end of the 2010 season.

On January 10, 2012, Nimo went on trial with Polish team Bytovia Bytów, which played in Polish Second League (3rd tier).

==== JK Tammeka Tartu ====
On March 7, 2012, Nimo signed a two-year contract with Estonian Meistriliiga club JK Tammeka Tartu. He made 34 appearances and scored six goals for the team in that season. The contract was mutually terminated before the 2013 season.

=== International ===
In 2006, Nimo was called up to the United States U-17 men's national soccer team as it entered its qualification campaign for the 2007 FIFA U-17 World Cup. He then played all four U.S. games at the World Cup as the U.S. went to the Round of 16 before being eliminated by Germany. In 2008, he became a regular with the United States U-20.

== Honors ==
=== Portland Timbers ===
- USL First Division Commissioner's Cup (1): 2009
