= Kénold Versailles =

Haitian footballer (born 1984)

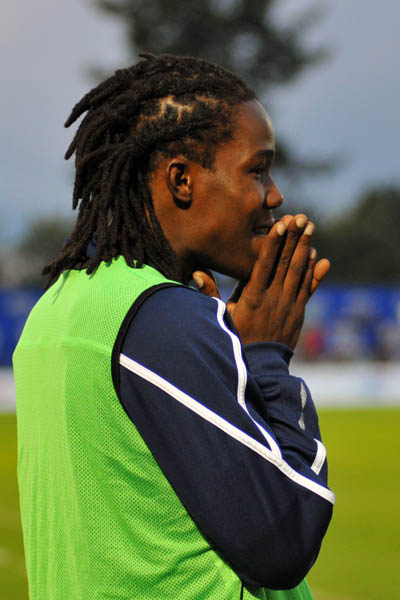

Personal information
- Full name: Kénold Versailles
- Date of birth: March 24, 1984 (age 42)
- Place of birth: Carrefour, Haiti
- Height: 6 ft 2 in (1.88 m)
- Position: Central midfielder

Team information
- Current team: Rochester Rhinos
- Number: 16

Youth career
- 1999–2003: Centre for Kids

Senior career*
Years	Team	Apps	(Gls)
2002–2005	Racing Club Haïtien	64	(8)
2006–2007	Roulado	46	(9)
2009	Vancouver Whitecaps	8	(1)
2009	→ Whitecaps Residency (loan)	6	(3)
2010	Crystal Palace Baltimore	1	(0)
2010–2012	Rochester Rhinos	22	(1)

International career
1999–2001	Haiti U-17	9	(4)
2001–2003	Haiti U-20	21	(4)
2004	Haiti U-23	3	(0)
2005–	Haiti	5	(0)
- * Club domestic league appearances and goals as of October 22, 2019

Kénold Versailles (born March 24, 1984) is a Haitian footballer who, from 2011–2012, played for Rochester Rhinos in the USL Professional Division.

== Career ==
=== Professional ===
Versailles played youth soccer at the Centre for Kids, which was sponsored by the Haitian Ministry of Sports, from 1999 to 2003. He then played six years in Division 1 Ligue Haitienne, the top league in Haiti, winning the league Clôture title in 2002 with Racing Club Haïtien, and starring for Roulado from 2006 to 2007.

Versailles was signed with the Vancouver Whitecaps of the USL First Division on January 10, 2009 and was released on 27 November 2009. On March 9, 2010, Crystal Palace Baltimore announced the signing of Versailles to a contract for the 2010 season.

In early June 2010, having failed to break into the Crystal Palace Baltimore first team on a regular basis, Versailles signed with Balrimore's divisional rivals Rochester Rhinos.

=== International ===
Versailles was a member of several Haitian national youth teams, participating in qualifying games for the 2001 FIFA U-17 World Championship in Trinidad and Tobago and the 2003 FIFA World Youth Championship United Arab Emirates. He was also a member of the U-23 Olympic team in 2004 before earning five caps at senior international level.

== Career statistics ==
(correct as of 16 April 2010)

Club	Season	League			Cup			Continental			Play-Offs			Total		
Club	Season	Apps	Goals	Assists	Apps	Goals	Assists	Apps	Goals	Assists	Apps	Goals	Assists	Apps	Goals	Assists
Vancouver	2009	8	1	0	-	-	-	1	0	0	6	0	0	15	1	0
Total	2009	8	1	0	-	-	-	1	0	0	6	0	0	15	1	0
Vancouver Whitecaps Residency (loan)	2009	6	3	0	-	-	-	-	-	-	-	-	-	6	3	0
Total	2009	6	3	0	-	-	-	-	-	-	-	-	-	6	3	0
Crystal Palace Baltimore	2010	1	0	0	-	-	-	-	-	-	-	-	-	1	0	0
Total	2010–present	1	0	0	-	-	-	-	-	-	-	-	-	1	0	0
Career Total	2002–present	125	21	?	0	0	0	1	0	0	6	0	0	132	21	?

== Honors ==
Rochester Rhinos

- USSF Division 2 Pro League regular season: 2010

Racing Club Haïtien

- Haitian League Clôture: 2002
