= Antouman Jallow =

Swedish footballer

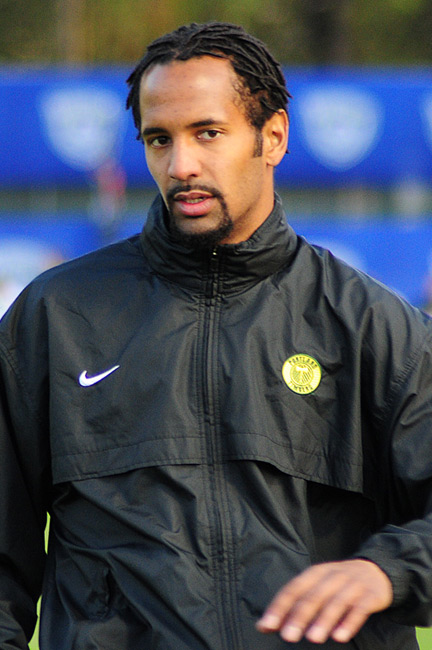

Personal information
- Full name: Antouman Jallow
- Date of birth: 11 June 1981 (age 45)
- Place of birth: Uppsala, Sweden
- Height: 6 ft 0 in (1.83 m)
- Position: Forward

Youth career
- 1994–1999: IK Sirius
- 2002–2005: UW–Milwaukee Panthers

Senior career*
Years	Team	Apps	(Gls)
2000–2001	IK Sirius	30	(12)
2005–2006	Gefle IF	6	(1)
2007–2008	IK Sirius	31	(17)
2009	Portland Timbers	2	(1)
2009	→ Sandvikens IF (loan)	?	(6)
- * Club domestic league appearances and goals as of 5 December 2009

Antouman Jallow (born 11 June 1981, in Uppsala) is a Swedish soccer player of Gambian heritage.

== Career ==
=== Early career in Sweden ===
Jallow was part of the youth system at his hometown club, IK Sirius, and was captain of the team which came second in Sweden's U-19 national championship. He played for Sirius in the Swedish second division from 2000 to 2001, scoring 12 goals in 30 games.

=== College ===
Jallow left Uppsala to attend university at and play college soccer at the University of Wisconsin–Milwaukee in 2002. He was both the team MVP and Horizon League player of the year in 2004.

=== Professional ===
Jallow was drafted in the fourth round (41st overall) of the 2005 MLS SuperDraft by San Jose Earthquakes, but chose not to sign with the team. Instead, Jallow moved back to Sweden, and spent the next two years playing for Gefle IF and IK Sirius. He scored 15 goals in 22 games for Sirius in the Superettan in 2007.

In January 2009, Jallow signed with the Portland Timbers of the USL First Division, but made just 2 starts fior the team before being loaned to Swedish Division 2 Club Sandvikens IF. He was released from his Portland contract on 7 December 2009.
