= Brian Visser =

American soccer player

Personal information
- Full name: Brian John Visser
- Date of birth: June 2, 1987 (age 39)
- Place of birth: Elmhurst, Illinois, United States
- Height: 6 ft 3 in (1.91 m)
- Position: Goalkeeper

College career
| Years | Team | Apps | (Gls) |
| 2005–2008 | DePaul Blue Demons | | |

Senior career*
| Years | Team | Apps | (Gls) |
| 2009 | Portland Timbers | 3 | (0) |
| 2010 | Real Maryland Monarchs | 2 | (0) |
| 2011 | Dayton Dutch Lions | 8 | (0) |
- * Club domestic league appearances and goals as of February 12, 2012

Brian Visser (born June 2, 1987, in Elmhurst, Illinois) is an American soccer goalkeeper that played for DePaul University as well as the USL Professional Division.

== Career ==
=== College ===
Visser played his collegiate soccer for DePaul University for four seasons between 2005 and 2008, missing only one game during his career.

He currently holds the following DePaul All-Time Goalkeeping Records:

Career Games Played (75)

Career Shutouts (28),

Shutouts in a Season (11 in 2008),

Goals Against Average in a Season (0.63 in 2008), and

Consecutive Shutouts (4 in 2007).

During his Junior year at DePaul (2007), Visser helped his team on their way to a Big East Conference Red Division Title and a berth in the NCAA National Tournament. That year, Visser received Big East Goalie of the Year, 1st team All-Big East Conference, and NSCAA Adidas All-Scholar All-American First Team. After his senior year (2008), Visser received 2nd Team All-Big East Conference honors.

Visser was a three-time All-Big East All-Academic team selection (2006, 2007, 2008) as well as a three-time DePaul Men's Soccer Most Valuable Player (2006, 2007, 2008).

=== Professional ===
After participating in MLS Preseason with the New England Revolution after his Senior season at DePaul, Visser ended up signing with the Portland Timbers of the United Soccer Leagues First Division on March 27, 2009. Throughout the year, Visser made several appearances during friendly matches (against Club América, Bayern Munich II, etc.) as well as one appearance during an official USL league match. He spent one season with the Portland Timbers.

Visser spent the 2010 Season with the Real Maryland Monarchs of the USL, training with DC United of the MLS several times throughout the season. Visser also trained with the Chicago Fire for approximately 3 months after the season was over. He then ending up signing with the Dayton Dutch Lions of the USL Professional Division in 2011. He made 8 appearances throughout the 2011 Season.

=== General ===
Visser graduated from DePaul University in November 2013 with a degree in finance. He is currently the Goalkeeper Coach at Benedictine University for the men's team, and is the Goalkeeping Director for Team Elmhurst Soccer Club, Lombard Firebirds, and Lightning SC. He also founded Visser Goalkeeping Academy in 2016.

He possesses an IYSA-USSF "E" Coaching License.
