= FC New Orleans =

- Full name: Football Club New Orleans
- Nicknames: FC NOLA, Falcons
- Founded: 2010
- Dissolved: 2015
- Ground: FC New Orleans Field; New Orleans, Louisiana
- Owner: Bertel Dejoie
- Website: http://www.fcnola.com/

FC New Orleans was an American amateur soccer team based in New Orleans, Louisiana.

The academy team was a provisional member of the National Premier Soccer League (NPSL) in 2012. They also competed in the 2014 LSA Adult State Cup.

== History ==
FC New Orleans was established in June 2010 to provide accessibility to quality soccer training for urban youth living in the Gentilly, Eastern New Orleans and St. Bernard Parish areas of the New Orleans Metro Area. It has since evolved into a club structure that includes beginner training for youths as young as 4 years old to adults in both recreational and Semi-Professional competitions.

On June 13, 2012, the NPSL accepted FC New Orleans as an expansion club for their 2012 season. However, the club was made a provisional member after registering past the league deadline for the 2012 season. FC New Orleans played one season and finished with a 2-0-1 record.

== Stadium ==
- FC New Orleans Field (2012)

== Players and staff ==
=== Staff ===
- Honduras Steven Morris – Youth Head Coach

== Record ==
=== Year-by-year ===
Year	League	Regular season	Position	Playoffs	U.S. Open Cup
2012	NPSL	2-0-1, South, South-Central	2nd	Did not qualify	Did not qualify
