= David Hayes (soccer) =

American soccer player

Personal information
- Full name: David Hayes
- Date of birth: May 24, 1976 (age 50)
- Place of birth: Waldorf, Maryland, United States
- Height: 5 ft 9 in (1.75 m)
- Position: Defender

College career
Years	Team	Apps	(Gls)
1995–1996	Charles County Hawks		
1997–1998	Wingate Bulldogs		

Senior career*
Years	Team	Apps	(Gls)
1999–2000	D.C. United	15	(0)
1999	→ MLS Pro-40 (loan)	14	(6)
2000	→ Hampton Roads Mariners (loan)	6	(2)
2001–2002	Chicago Fire	3	(1)
2001	→ Milwaukee Rampage (loan)	24	(6)
2002	→ Richmond Kickers (loan)	27	(8)
2003	Rochester Raging Rhinos	28	(3)
2004	Richmond Kickers	26	(3)
2005–2008	Atlanta Silverbacks	81	(12)
2009	Portland Timbers	30	(2)
2010	Carolina RailHawks	14	(0)
2011	FC Tampa Bay	13	(0)

Managerial career
- 2009: Portland Timbers U23's (assistant)
- 2011: FC Tampa Bay (assistant)
- * Club domestic league appearances and goals as of September 11, 2011

David Hayes (born May 24, 1976, in Waldorf, Maryland) is an American soccer player who most recently played for FC Tampa Bay in the North American Soccer League.

Hayes began his professional career in Major League Soccer with D.C. United. His tenure at the highest level was short-lived, as he primarily served as a substitute, and was subsequently loaned out most of the time to the United Soccer Leagues. Hayes' career rejuvenated when he stayed permanently at the USL First Division, particularly with Atlanta Silverbacks and Portland Timbers.

His achievements included winning the Commissioner's Cup, earning the Defender of the Year award, and receiving All-League honors for three consecutive years. In February 2010 he was ranked 13th in the USL First Division Top 25 of the Decade, which announced a list of the best and most influential players of the previous decade.

== Playing career ==
=== College ===
Hayes attended Charles County Community College, playing on the men's football (soccer) team in 1995 and 1996. Hayes was the team captain of the team which went to the national post-season tournament both seasons. He was selected as a 1995 and 1996 first team All American and set the national scoring record in 1996 with 53 goals, and finished his career there with 104 goals. In 1997, he transferred to NCAA Division II Wingate University where he scored 59 goals in two seasons. He was a 1997 second team and 1998 first team All American.

=== Professional ===
In February 1999, D.C. United selected Hayes in the 3rd round (28th overall) of the 1999 MLS College Draft. He played five games with United in 1999 as well as appearing with MLS Pro-40. In 2000, he played 10 games with United and also went on loan with the Hampton Roads Mariners of USL A-League before placing him on waivers on November 1, 2000.

Chicago Fire signed Hayes for the 2001 season, but sent him on loan to Milwaukee Rampage of the USL A-League. In June, Chicago called him up to the first team. He played two games as a late sub, earned his only start with the Fire on June 30, 2001. He scored a goal, but never played another game with the Fire. During his loan spell at Milwaukee, Hayes managed to score six goals and record six assists that led the Rampage to the semi-finals of the playoff stages, where along the way the club eliminated the regular-season champions Richmond Kickers from the post season. In 2002, he spent the season on loan with the Richmond Kickers, where he managed to achieve a career high with eight goals throughout the 2002 campaign. The Kickers went to the 2002 Finals, but ironically fell 2–1 to his former club the Milwaukee Rampage. On December 17, 2002, the Kickers traded Hayes to the Rochester Rhinos in exchange for Greg Simmonds. On March 29, 2004, he returned to the Kickers.

In 2005, he signed with Atlanta Silverbacks of the USL First Division. In 2007, Hayes guided the Silverbacks to a successful season where he contributed by registering seven goals and four assists. His efforts helped Atlanta reach the post season for the first time since 2002, and earned himself an All-League First Team selection and was named the USL-1 Defender of the Year. During the club's playoff round, Hayes helped Atlanta reach the playoff finals for the second time in the club's history, but unfortunately they were defeated by regular-season champions the Seattle Sounders by a score of 4–0. In 2008, Hayes was announced to his second straight All-League selection, despite a disappointing season, and named to the team of the week three times. In 2009, the Silverbacks withdrew from the league for the 2009 season.

On January 21, 2009, Hayes was named the head coach of the Atlanta Silverbacks Women. Within a month he resigned from his managerial position without managing a single match for the club.

On February 26, 2009, Hayes signed a one-year contract with Portland Timbers. He played 30 games and scored twice for Portland in 2009, helping the team to post the best defensive record of the season by only conceding 19 goals. He played in all 30 games and finished the season with the second most minutes played in the league behind Jay Nolly. He led the Timbers in achieving a league-record 24-game unbeaten streak, and helped clinch the USL1 Regular Season title. On September 30, 2009, Hayes received his third consecutive All-League honor, by being selected once more to the All-League First Team. On December 7, 2009, Portland announced the release of Hayes from his contract.

He signed for Carolina RailHawks on May 12, 2010., and on February 15, 2011, Hayes was named as a player-assistant coach for FC Tampa Bay of the North American Soccer League.

Tampa Bay declined the 2012 contract option for Hayes, including the coaching option, on January 31, 2012.

In 2017, Hayes joined Here for Beer of the Beaches Adult Soccer League.

== Honors ==
=== Atlanta Silverbacks ===
- Southern Derby Cup (2): 2005, 2006

=== D.C. United ===
- Major League Soccer MLS Cup (1): 1999

=== Portland Timbers ===
- USL First Division Commissioner's Cup (1): 2009
- Cascadia Cup (1): 2009

=== Individual ===
- USL First Division Defender of the Year (1): 2007
- USL First Division All-League First Team (3): 2007, 2008, 2009

Here For Beer

- Spring Regular Season and Tournament Champions: 2017
