= Gustavo Bentos =

Uruguayan footballer (born 1976)

Personal information
- Full name: Gustavo Alberto Bentos Gómez
- Date of birth: December 14, 1976 (age 49)
- Place of birth: Montevideo, Uruguay
- Height: 6 ft 0 in (1.83 m)
- Position: Forward

Senior career*
Years	Team	Apps	(Gls)
1992–1997	Bella Vista	215	(82)
1998	Progreso	36	(16)
1999	Montevideo Wanderers	36	(12)
2000	Deportes Arica	23	(13)
2001	Deportes La Serena	30	(9)
2002	Magallanes	28	(11)
2003	Deportes Arica	16	(14)
2003	Santiago Wanderers	13	(8)
2004	Real Potosí	40	(26)
2005	Fernández Vial	15	(13)
2005	Deportes Temuco	15	(8)
2006	Maccabi Tel Aviv	0	(0)
2007	Deportes Copiapó	15	(8)
2008–2010	Charlotte Eagles	25	(4)
Total		507	(224)

International career
- Uruguay U17
- Uruguay U20
- Uruguay U23
- * Club domestic league appearances and goals

Gustavo Alberto Bentos Gómez (born December 14, 1976) is a former Uruguayan footballer who played as a forward.

== Career ==
=== Club ===
Bentos spent most of his early professional career in Uruguay, Bolivia and Chile. In Bolivia, Bentos scored 19 goals in 35 games, and was third in scoring for the First Division of Bolivia. In 2005 Bentos played for Fernández Vial, scoring 13 goals in 20 games, before moving to Chilean club Deportes Copiapó in 2007.

Bentos signed with Charlotte Eagles of the USL Second Division in 2008, but struggled with injuries during his first season, and was limited to just three appearances and one goal.

He retired from being a professional soccer player this 2011

=== International ===
Bentos has a great deal of international experience, having played with the U-17, U-20 and U-23 Uruguayan national teams.
