= Tony McManus (soccer) =

American soccer player and coach

Personal information
- Full name: Anthony McManus
- Date of birth: September 22, 1980 (age 46)
- Place of birth: Erie, Pennsylvania, United States
- Height: 1.75 m (5 ft 9 in)
- Position: Midfielder

Team information
- Current team: Atlanta Silverbacks
- Number: 30

College career
Years	Team	Apps	(Gls)
1999–2003	UAB Blazers		

Senior career*
Years	Team	Apps	(Gls)
2002	Memphis Express	18	(2)
2004	Chicago Fire	0	(0)
2004	→ Virginia Beach Mariners (loan)	24	(1)
2005–2008	Atlanta Silverbacks	156	(7)
2005	→ FC Dallas (loan)	0	(0)
2009–2010	Portland Timbers	52	(1)
2011	FC Tampa Bay	6	(0)
2011	Carolina RailHawks	7	(1)
2012	Atlanta Silverbacks	21	(0)
- * Club domestic league appearances and goals as of September 26, 2012

Anthony McManus (born September 22, 1980, in Erie, Pennsylvania) is an American former soccer player who is currently an assistant coach for the Memphis Tigers.

== Career ==
=== College and amateur ===
McManus played college soccer for the University of Alabama at Birmingham from 2000 to 2003, where he was recognized as one of the best defenders in Conference USA (C-USA). McManus was selected to the C-USA Team of the week three times, Soccer America Magazine Team of The Week twice, and College Soccer News Team of the Week once. He was also a C-USA third team All Conference his junior year. The accolades continued his senior season when McManus was named C-USA first team All Conference, the C-USA Defender of the Year, an NSCAA third team All-America, and a College Soccer Times All America.

In 2002, McManus played with the Memphis Express in the USL Premier Development League.

McManus also played ODP for Region III, making the Tennessee State team from 1994 to 1999, and was selected for the Region III team in 1996 and the US National Pool in 1998. He was also selected to the USASA Region III Team in 2003 and was a member of the US National B Team.

=== Professional ===
McManus was drafted in the sixth round (59th overall) in the 2004 MLS SuperDraft by Chicago Fire. He played in all pre-season matches for the Fire, but sent on loan with the Virginia Beach Mariners of the USL First Division. He played 24 games in the 2004 season, scoring 1 goal and 2 assists in 898 minutes. After the USL season ended McManus was recalled to the Fire and played 35 minutes in the inaugural Hall of Fame Game against the New York/New Jersey Metrostars.

In 2005, McManus moved to the Atlanta Silverbacks of the USL First Division, where he stayed until the team's demise following the 2008 season. He played in 24 games and logged 1027 minutes in 12 starts in his first season with the team, and ultimately played 156 league games in his four seasons with the team, scoring 7 goals.

Following the conclusion of the 2005 USL1 season McManus was briefly loaned to FC Dallas of the MLS; he played in two reserve matches, logging 90 minutes, but never saw any first team action.

In January 2009, McManus signed with the Portland Timbers of the USL-1. McManus spent two years with the USL franchise helping them to the Commissioners Cup Championship. He joined the Timbers for their inaugural 2011 MLS camp and decided to leave the team at the end of the preseason due to contract breakdowns.

McManus signed with FC Tampa Bay of the second division North American Soccer League on March 4, 2011. On May 26, 2011, it was announced that McManus had been released by Tampa, citing breach of contract. McManus announced his retirement from professional soccer on June 23, 2011.

Following a month long hiatus from the game, McManus returned to the Portland Timbers and appeared in two matches against San Jose in a reserve team match and Ajax in an exhibition.

On August 12, 2011, it was announced that McManus had signed a contract to finish the season with the Carolina RailHawks, also of the North American Soccer League.

The Atlanta Silverbacks, now playing in the North American Soccer League, announced the return of McManus to the squad on January 30, 2012. Following the 2012 season McManus officially retired from professional soccer and finished as the all-time leader in appearances with the Silverbacks organization with 132

== Coaching ==
Following his retirement Tony joined the staff at Oglethorpe University D3 in Atlanta, GA. Following the conclusion of the 2012 College season, McManus joined the Stetson Coaching Staff in Florida.

In the spring McManus left Stetson and moved back to Memphis to join the University of Memphis Coaching staff where he is currently the first assistant.

In addition to coaching at the University of Memphis, McManus coaches with the Lobos Soccer Club in Collierville, TN.

== Honors ==
=== Portland Timbers ===
- USL First Division Commissioner's Cup (1): 2009
