= Motagua New Orleans =

- Full name: CD Motagua of New Orleans
- Nickname: Blue Eagles
- Founded: 1984; 42 years ago
- Dissolved: 2022
- Ground: Muss Bertolino Field; Kenner, LA
- Capacity: 5,000
- Owners: John Hamide, Tony Martinez
- Manager: Tony Martinez
- League: Gulf Coast Premier League
Home colours

Motagua New Orleans was an American soccer club based in New Orleans, Louisiana that played in the Gulf Coast Premier League. The team was founded in 1984 and competed in both the ISLANO and Louisiana Premier League before folding in 2022.

== History ==
Motagua New Orleans was founded in 1984 by a collaboration of three family of brothers, the Serrano, Martinez and Diaz brothers. The team was managed by the Serrano brothers from 1984-1999 where they competed in the ISLANO and SELASA leagues in New Orleans. In 1999 current team manager and part owner, Mario "Tony" Martinez, gained rights as the sole owner of the team.

In 2010, Dr. John Hamide acquired part ownership of the team and formed an alliance between PDL team, Baton Rouge Capitals, which he also owned, and Motagua. Motagua New Orleans provided year-round high-level competition that allowed local Baton Rouge Capital players to stay fit for the PDL season.

In the most recent years Motagua has enjoyed success competing at both a regional and national level. They won the 2015 USASA Region III National Cup which qualified them for the 2015 USASA National Cup where they lost 1-0 to RWB Adria in the semifinals.

On February 3, 2016 Motagua New Orleans qualified for the 2016 Lamar Hunt U.S. Open Cup. Being the first amateur team from Louisiana to do so in the US Open Cup's current format.

== Summaries ==
Team's performance at Gulf Coast Premier League.

Season	Record	Goals	Finish
2014–15	7–0–1	48:14	Winners
2015–16	5–2–1	20:7	Winners
2016–17	10–2–0	45:13	Winners
2017	6–1–4	33:21	Semifinalist
2018	9–1–2	37:20	Semifinalist

== Current roster ==
Roster submitted May 12, 2018 for the 2018 Gulf Coast Premier League Note: Flags indicate national team as defined under FIFA eligibility rules; some limited exceptions apply. Players may hold more than one non-FIFA nationality.

No.	Pos.	Nation	Player
1	GK	HON	Donaldo Morales
2	DF	ENG	Stuart Hayers
3	DF	USA	John Hamide
4	DF	USA	Scott Burris
5	MF	USA	Brandon Chagnard
7	MF	HON	Steven Morris
8	MF	HON	Samir Arzú
9	FW	ENG	Reese Wilson
10	FW	BRA	Leonardo Ferreira de Barros
11	MF	HON	Fernando Vargas
12	DF	HON	Carlos Palacios

No.	Pos.	Nation	Player
13	DF	USA	Hisham Abdelaziz
15	MF	ENG	Kier Hannity
16	MF	HON	Carlos Ramos
17	DF	USA	PJ Lynch
18	FW	USA	Carlos Martinez
19	FW	USA	Carson Gorecki
20	FW	USA	Gino Ray
21	GK	USA	Pepe Serrano
23	MF	BRA	Caio Cruz
32	DF	USA	Anthony Peters
99	MF	IRQ	Saad Garadi

=== Notable former players ===
This list of notable former players comprises players who went on to play professional soccer after playing for the Motagua New Orleans, or those who previously played professionally before joining the team.

- (United States) Anthony Peters
- (Honduras) Víctor Ortiz
- (Honduras) Jaime Rosales
- (Honduras) Hendry Cordova
- (Honduras) Donaldo Morales
- (Honduras) Carlos Palacios

== Honours ==
- Gulf Coast Premier League: 2016-2017
- ISLANO: 1994, 2004, 2013, 2014, 2015, 2016
- Louisiana Premier League: 2014-2015, 2015-2016
- USASA Region III National Cup: 2015, 2017
- Lamar Hunt U.S. Open Cup: Competed in the 2016 Lamar Hunt U.S. Open Cup
