= Port City FC =

American semi-professional soccer club

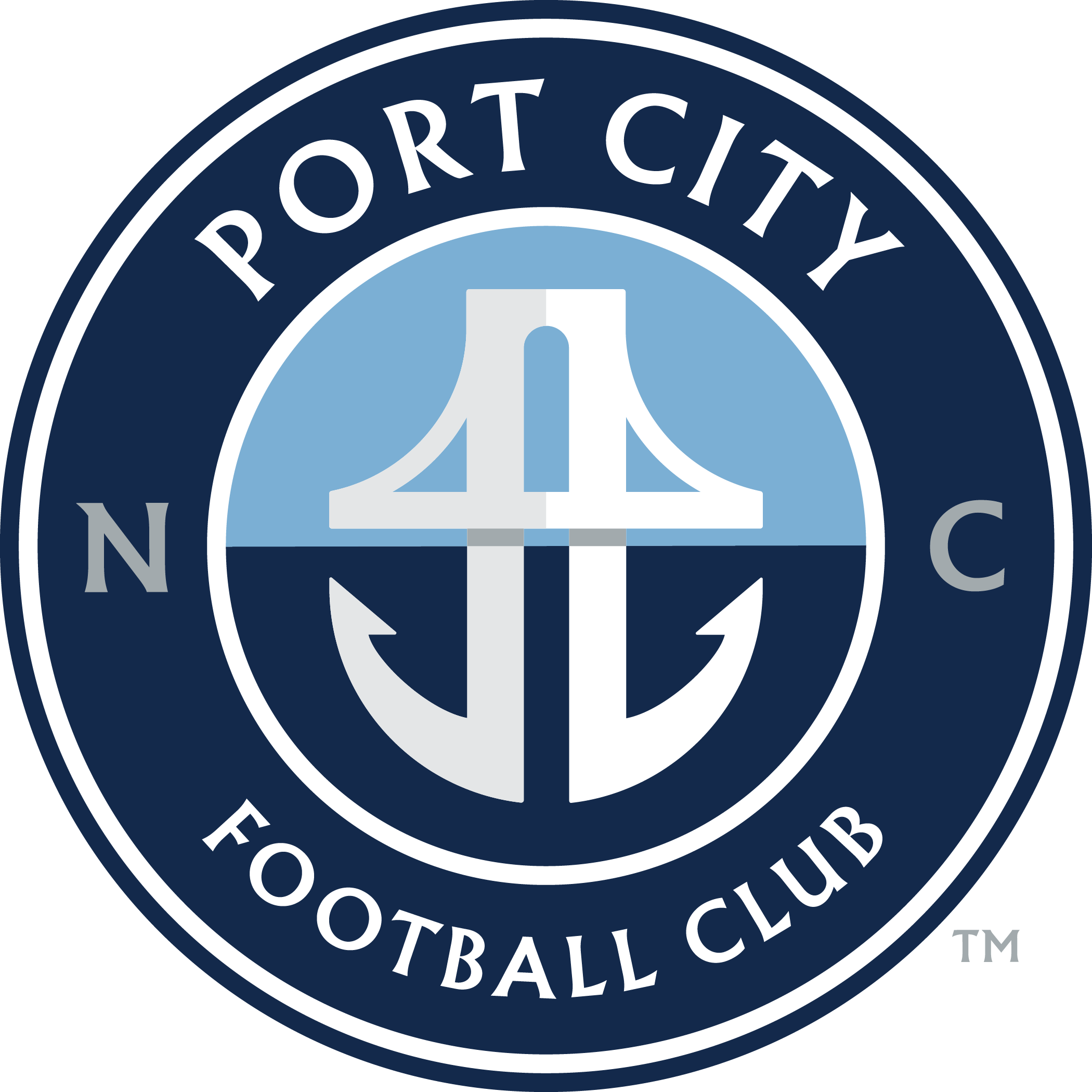
- Full name: Port City Football Club
- Nickname: the Gulls
- Founded: March 15, 2014; 12 years ago
- Ground: Legion Stadium; Wilmington, North Carolina
- Capacity: 6,000
- Head Coach: Nate Torbett
- League: USL League Two
- Website: portcitysoccer.com
Home colours

Port City FC is an American semi-professional soccer club based in Wilmington, North Carolina that competes in the USL League Two.

== History ==
The club was founded in 2014 as "Biloxi City Football Club". Joao Johanning Mora, along with partners Joey Lipoff and Eion Dockery, formed Biloxi City FC as a semi-professional club as a nonprofit alternative for the North Carolina's northeastern coastal soccer community. Port City FC plans to launch a Women’s Premier Soccer League (WPSL) expansion team this summer, embarking on an exhibition season with six to eight matches.

== Club culture ==
=== Logo ===
In 2025 Port City FC introduced a new logo that blended its earlier identity with a more modern, European-style presentation. The crest used a handcrafted anchor as its central feature. The design maintained continuity with the previous emblem while adopting a more professional aesthetic similar to those used by MLS, USL, and leading European clubs.

== Year-by-year ==
=== Women's team ===
Year	Division	League	Reg. season	Playoffs
2025	4	WPSL	1st, Carolinas	Conference Play-offs
