= Anthony Peters (soccer) =

American soccer player

Personal information
- Full name: Ferman Anthony Peters
- Date of birth: October 24, 1983 (age 43)
- Place of birth: Baton Rouge, Louisiana, United States
- Height: 6 ft 6 in (1.98 m)
- Position: Defender

Youth career
- 2002–2003: Kentucky Wildcats
- 2007–2008: West Virginia Wesleyan Bobcats

Senior career*
Years	Team	Apps	(Gls)
2004	Carolina Dynamo	7	(2)
2005–2006	New Orleans Shell Shockers	18	(0)
2007–2008	Baton Rouge Capitals	20	(0)
2009	D.C. United	0	(0)
2009	→ Harrisburg City Islanders (loan)	1	(0)
2009	→ Richmond Kickers (loan)	4	(0)
2009	Cleveland City Stars	7	(0)
2009	Newport County	3	(0)
2010	Mansfield Town	0	(0)
2010	Gainsborough Trinity	6	(0)
2011	Baton Rouge Capitals	3	(0)
2011–2015	Motagua New Orleans		
2015	Wilmington Hammerheads FC	8	(0)
2016	Tulsa Roughnecks	10	(0)
2017–2019	Motagua New Orleans	18	(4)
- * Club domestic league appearances and goals as of 15 July 2016

Anthony Peters (born October 24, 1983) is an American soccer player.

== Career ==
=== Youth and college ===
Peters attended Baton Rouge Magnet High School and played two years of college soccer at the University of Kentucky, before trying his hand at playing professionally in both Norway and Iceland. Finding opportunities in Europe limited, he returned to college in 2007, playing for West Virginia Wesleyan College, where he was named as the WVIAC Player of the Year and to the NSCAA/Adidas Atlantic Region All-American First Team in 2008.

During his college years he also played with Carolina Dynamo, New Orleans Shell Shockers and Baton Rouge Capitals in the USL Premier Development League, and spent time training with European teams in Iceland and Norway.

=== Professional ===
In February 2009, Peters signed with the Cleveland City Stars. The team released him from his contract after he received an offer from D.C. United after impressing head coach Tom Soehn during the club's pre-season tour of Puerto Rico. He made his professional debut for DC on April 22, 2009, in the 2009 Lamar Hunt U.S. Open Cup against FC Dallas., before being loaned to the Harrisburg City Islanders of the USL Second Division in April 2009 and later to Richmond Kickers in May 2009.

Peters was waived by D.C. United in June 2009. On July 16, 2009, he was signed by the Cleveland City Stars.

After a brief trial with English non-League side Mansfield Town, Peters signed a pre-contract agreement to join the club permanently when the English transfer window re-opened on January 1, 2010. On December 4, 2009, Peters signed a short-term deal with then Conference South club, Newport County. Described as a "pure athlete" by County manager Dean Holdsworth, he joined the Welsh club for a month prior to signing for Mansfield Town. However, the move to Mansfield was cancelled due to Peters' wage demands. Mansfield manager David Holdsworth said "He has effectively priced himself out of our market".

On January 29, 2010, it was announced that Peters had signed for Gainsborough Trinity, but he remained with the club for only five weeks.
