= Nathaniel Short =

English footballer

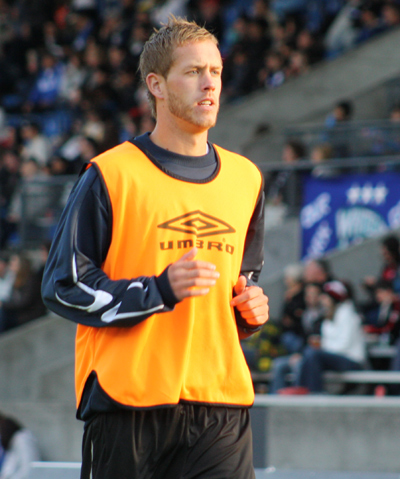

Personal information
- Full name: Nathaniel Short
- Date of birth: 28 January 1985 (age 41)
- Place of birth: London, England
- Position: Defender

Youth career
- 2005–2008: Lynn Fighting Knights

Senior career*
Years	Team	Apps	(Gls)
2003	Wellington		
2004	Bridgwater Town		
2007–2008	Cape Cod Crusaders	18	(2)
2009–2010	Rochester Rhinos	39	(2)
2012	GPS Portland Phoenix	8	(3)
- * Club domestic league appearances and goals

Nathaniel "Nano" Short (born 28 January 1985 in London) is an English footballer.

== Career ==
=== Early life and college ===
Short grew up in Taunton in the English county of Somerset, with his Mother Donna Morris and Father Martin Short. He attended Ladymead School, and played for English non-league sides Wellington and Bridgwater Town before coming to the United States on a scholarship in 2005.

He played four years of college soccer at Lynn University, earned an All-Sunshine State Conference Honorable Mention honors and a Daktronics First Team All-Region selection as a sophomore, was named the Fighting Knights' Most Valuable Player and to the All-SSC First Team as a junior, and earned All-American honors during his senior year. During his four years as a Fighting Knight he scored 25 career goals and amassed 25 career assists.

During his college career he also played with the Cape Cod Crusaders in the USL Premier Development League. Nathaniel was selected to the Team of the Decade for the Cape Cod Crusaders.

=== Professional ===
Short signed his first professional contract in 2009, with the Rochester Rhinos in the USL First Division. He made his professional debut on 18 April 2009, in Rochester's season-opening game against Carolina RailHawks.

== Honors ==
=== Rochester Rhinos ===
Rochester Rhinos Rookie of the year 2009

USL Team of the Week; Following his goal against MSFC

- USSF Division 2 Pro League Regular Season Champions (1): 2010
