= Sports in New Orleans =

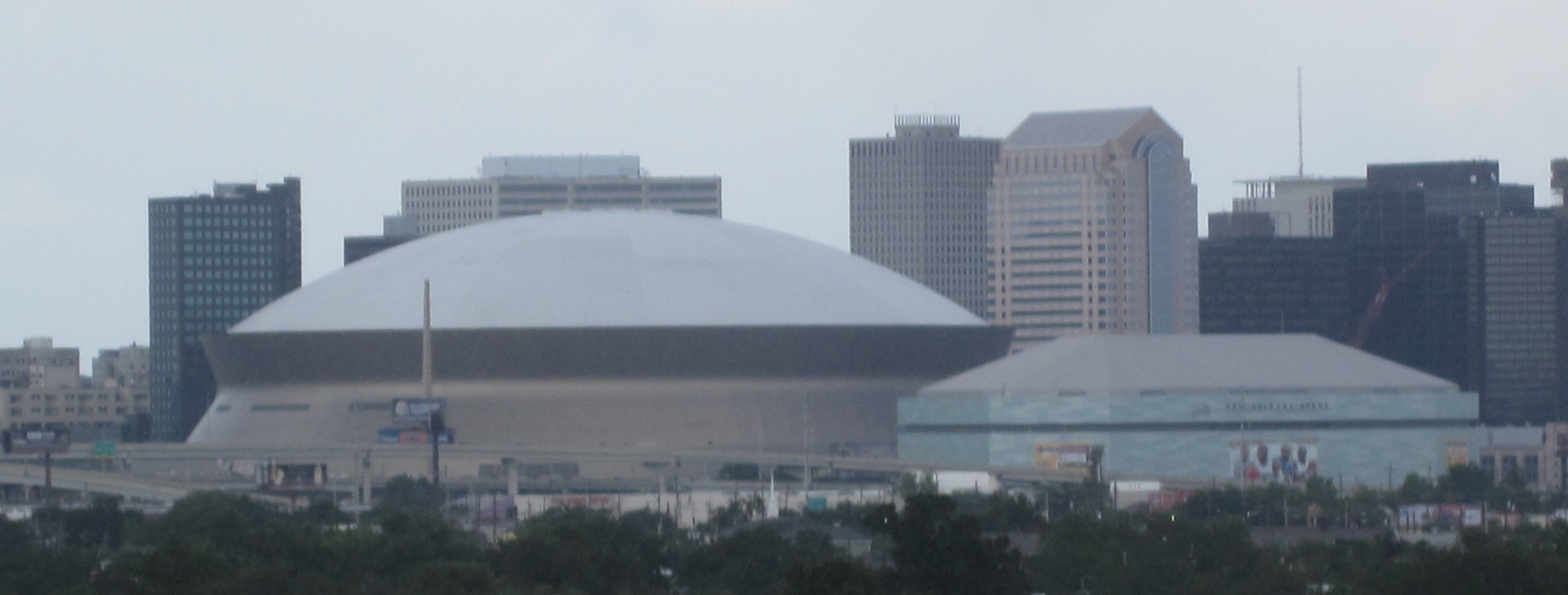
Caesars Superdome (left) and the Smoothie King Center (right); home of the Saints and Pelicans

New Orleans is home to a wide variety of sporting events. Most notable are the teams of the New Orleans Pelicans (NBA) and the New Orleans Saints (NFL) the annual Sugar Bowl, the annual Zurich Classic (PGA Tour) and horse racing at the Fair Grounds Race Course. New Orleans has also hosted the Super Bowl, College Football Playoff semifinal game and the NCAA college basketball Final Four.

== Major professional sports teams ==
Club	Sport	League	Founded	Venue
New Orleans Saints	American football	National Football League	1967	Caesars Superdome
New Orleans Pelicans	Basketball	National Basketball Association	2002	Smoothie King Center

== Other professional sports teams ==
Club	Sport	League	Founded	Venue
New Orleans Jesters	Soccer	National Premier Soccer League	2003	Pan American Stadium
Laketown Squadron	Basketball	NBA G League	2026	Pontchartrain Center

New Orleans Saints, Image is the logo for the professional NFL football team based in New Orleans

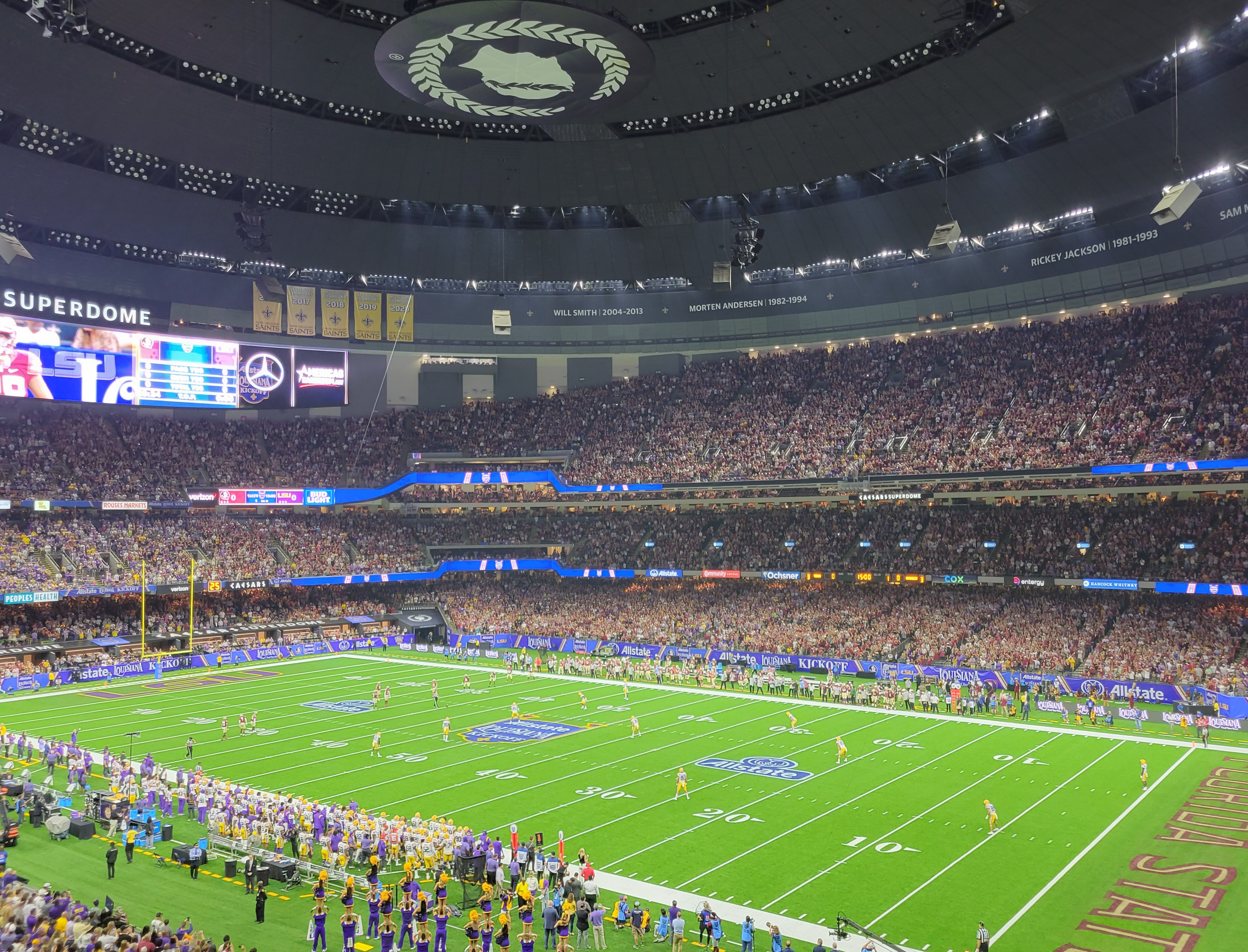
Interior of the Caesars Superdome, Home of the New Orleans Saints

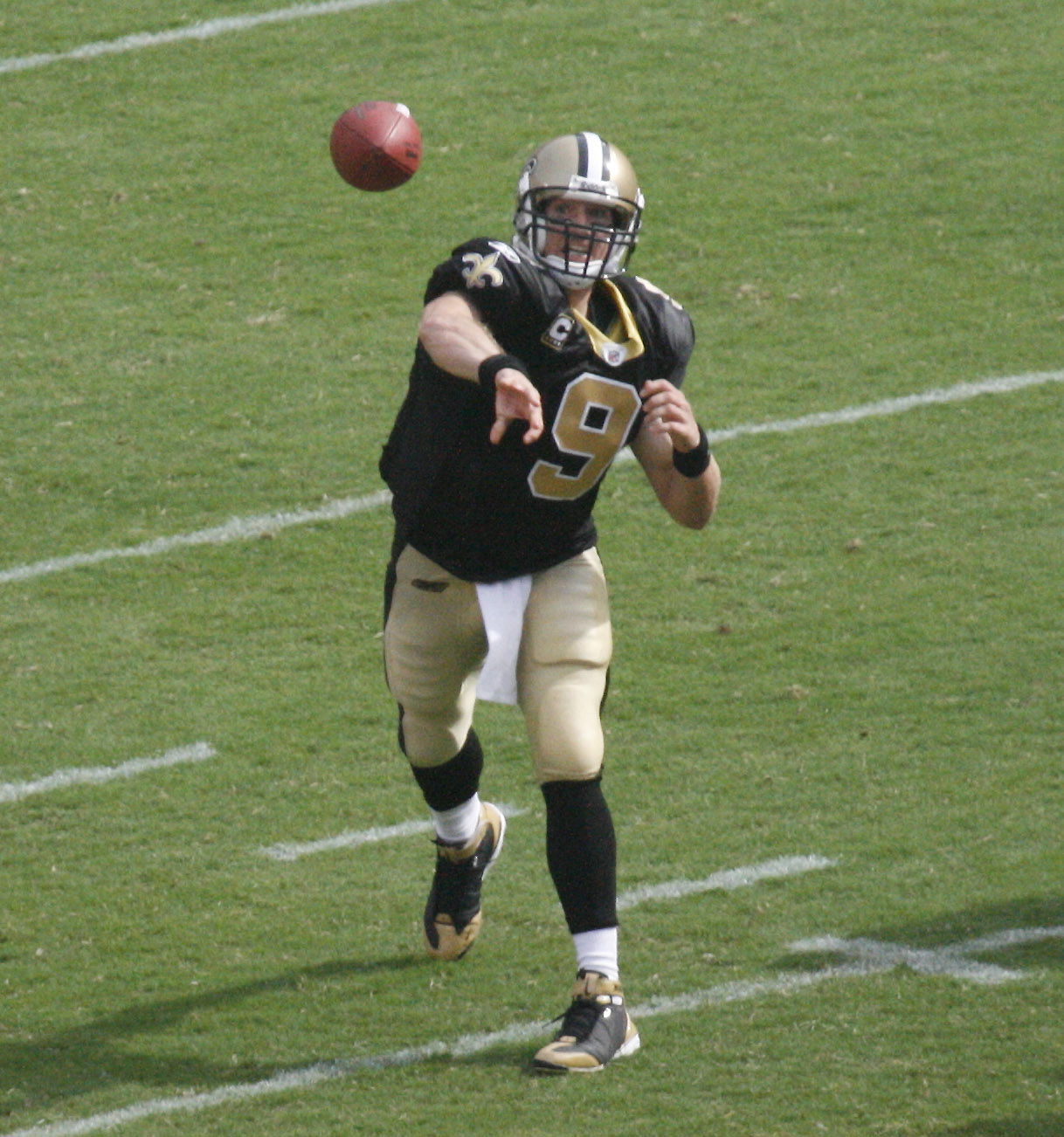
Former New Orleans Saints quarterback, Drew Brees

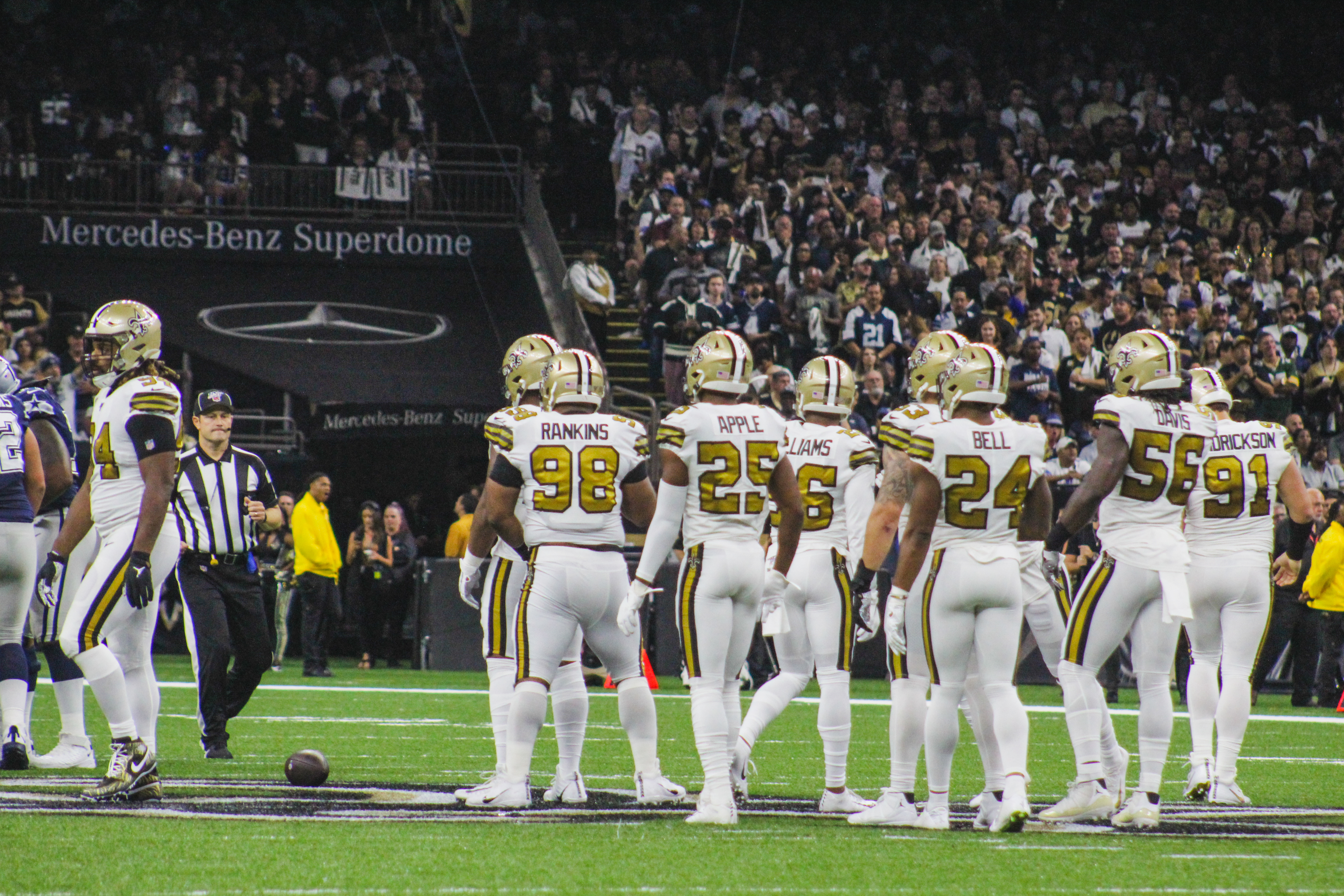
The New Orleans Saints take on the Dallas Cowboys

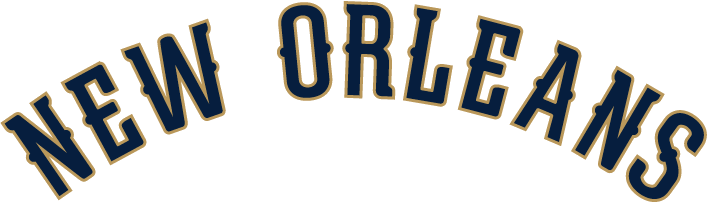
New Orleans Pelicans, Image is the wordmark for the professional NBA basketball team based in New Orleans

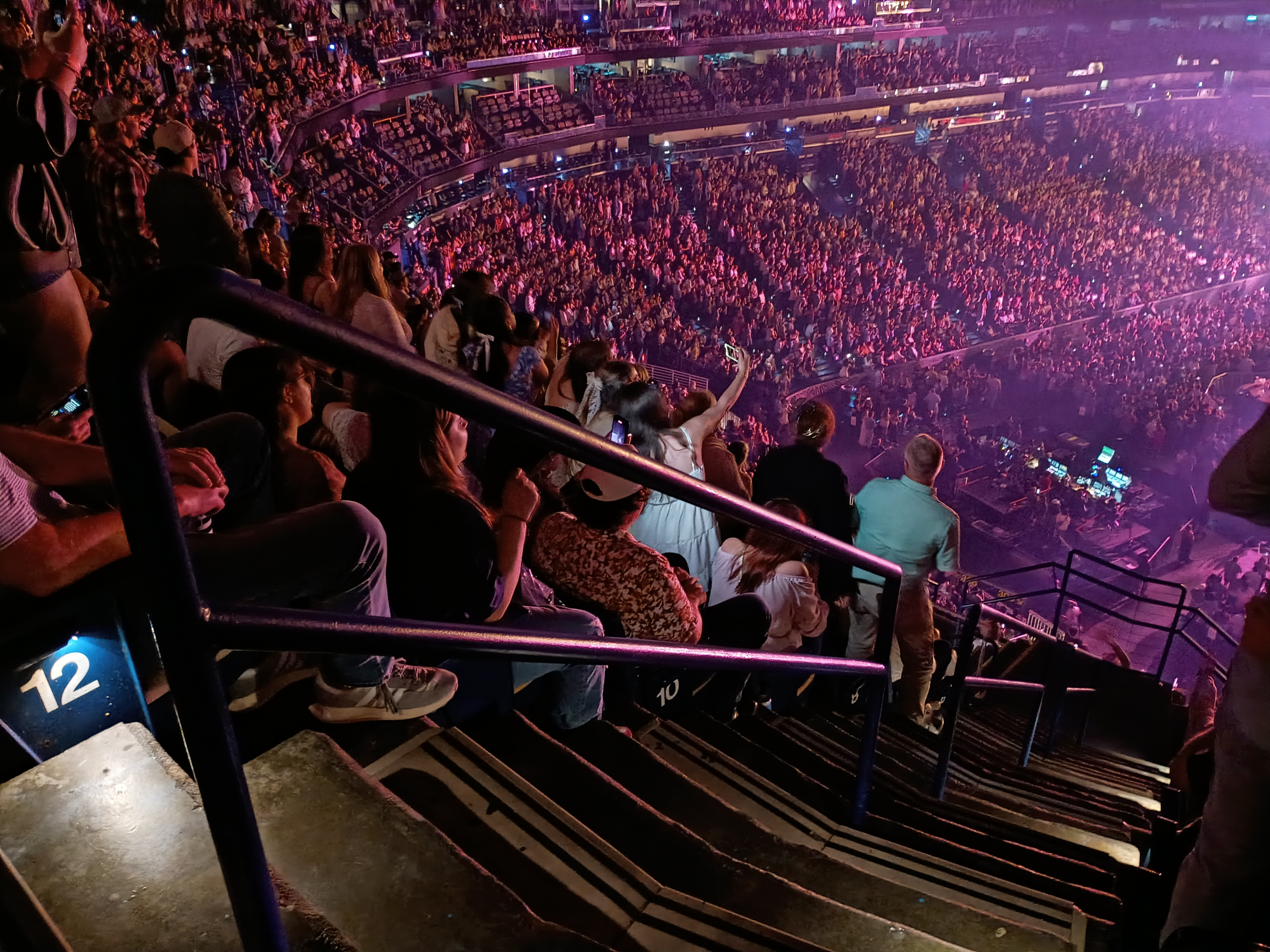
Interior of the Smoothie King Center, Home of the New Orleans Pelicans

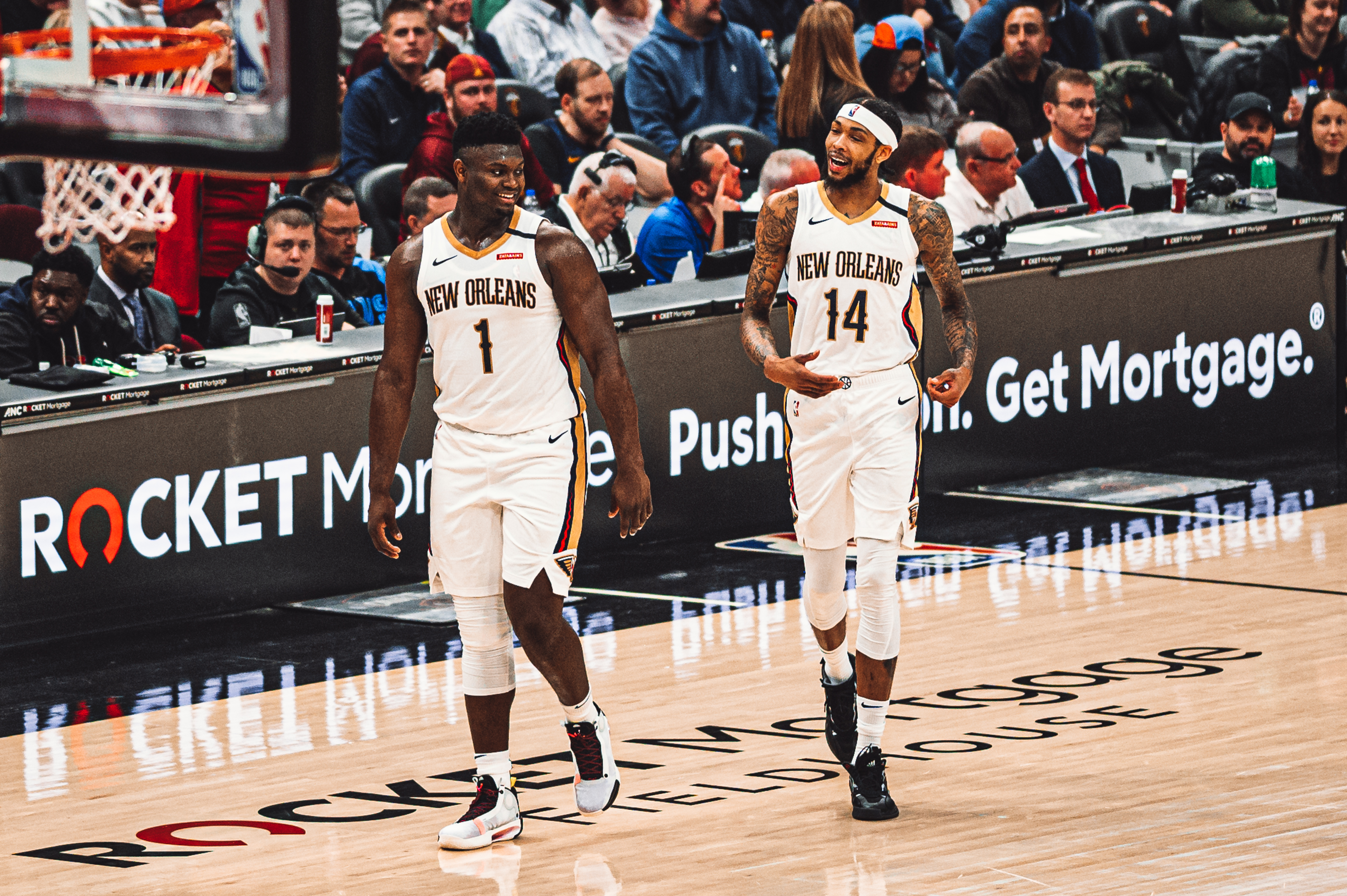
New Orleans Pelicans players Zion Williamson and Brandon Ingram

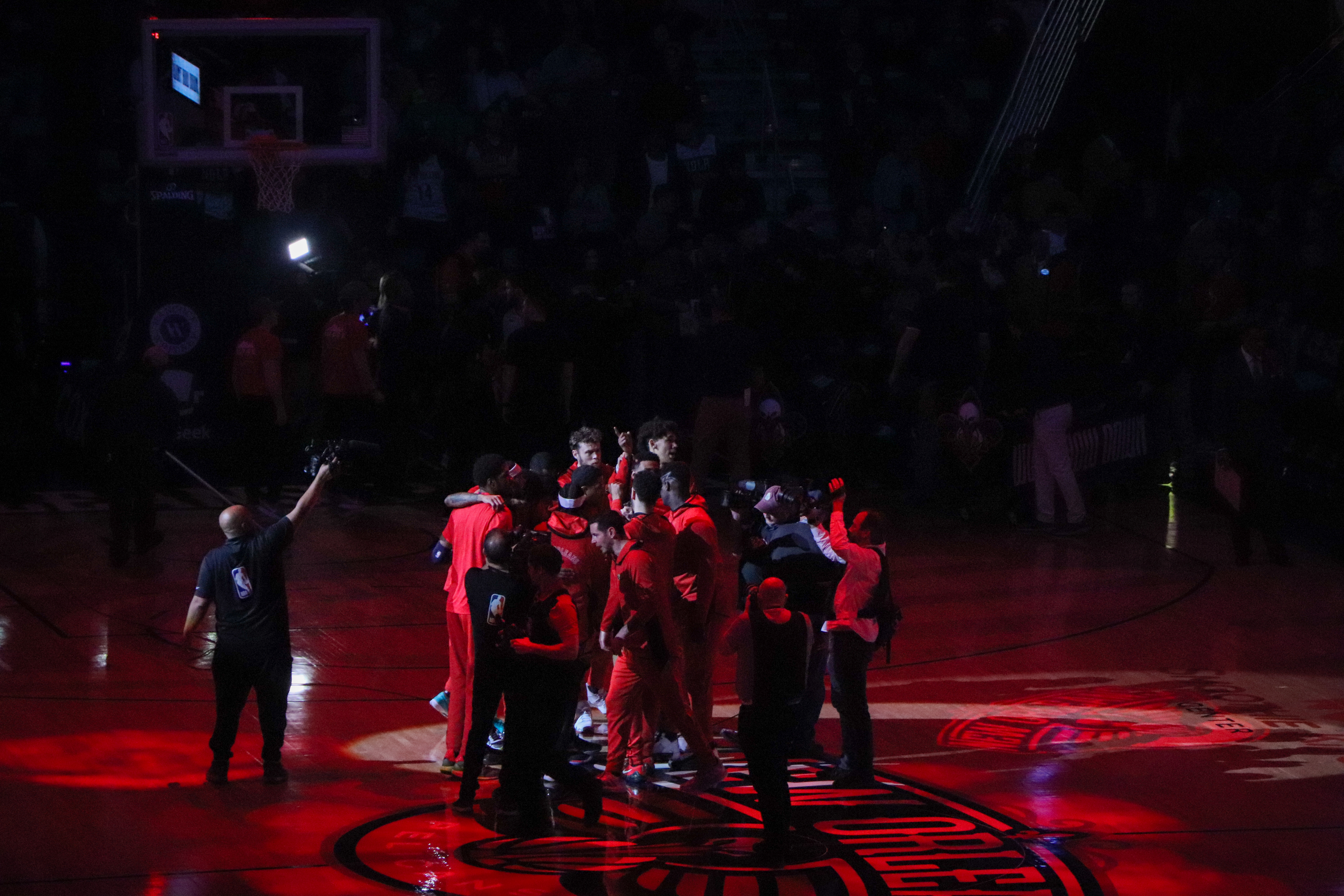
New Orleans Pelicans huddle pregame before taking on the Memphis Grizzlies on January 31, 2020

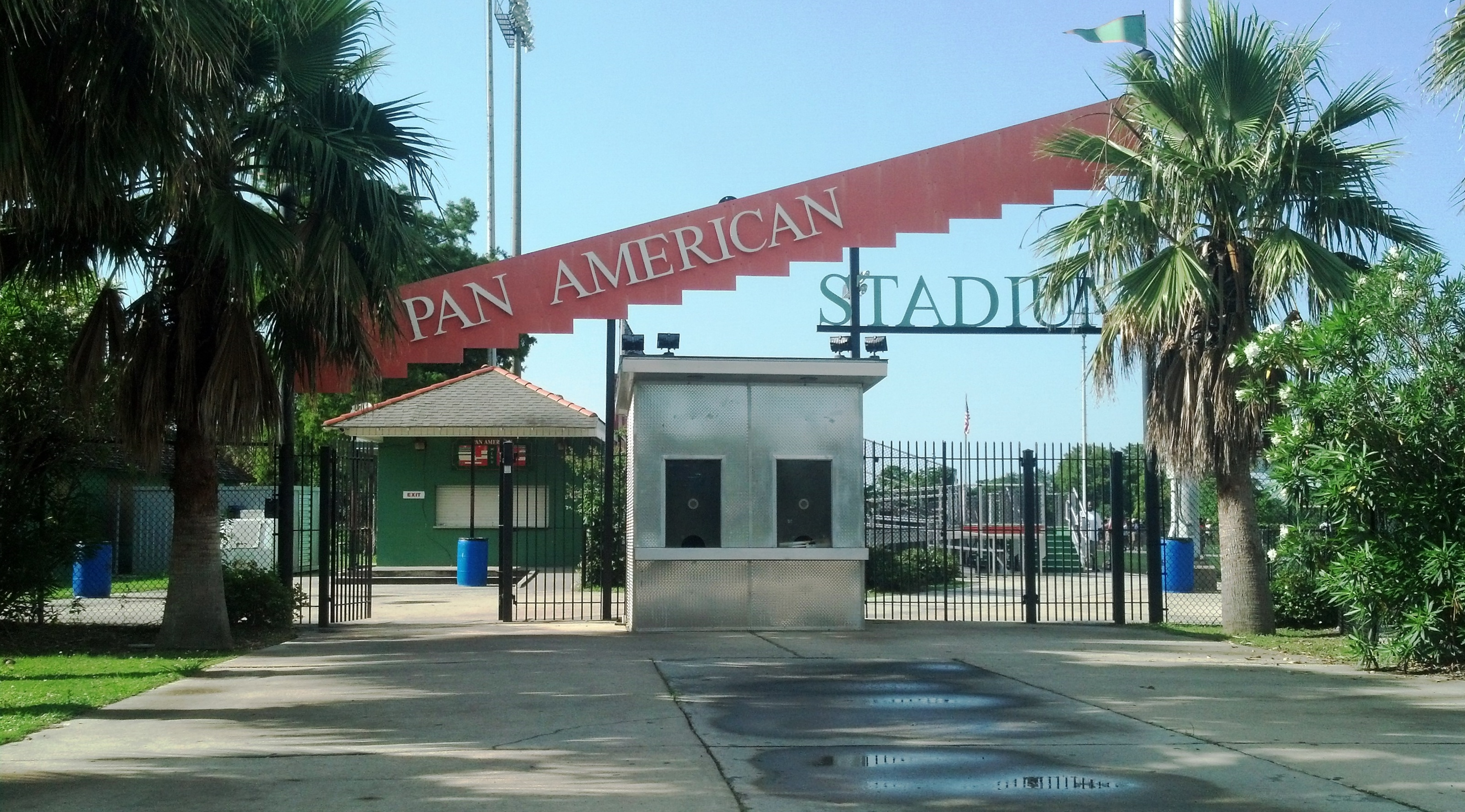
Pan American Stadium, Home of the New Orleans Jesters, National Premier Soccer League team

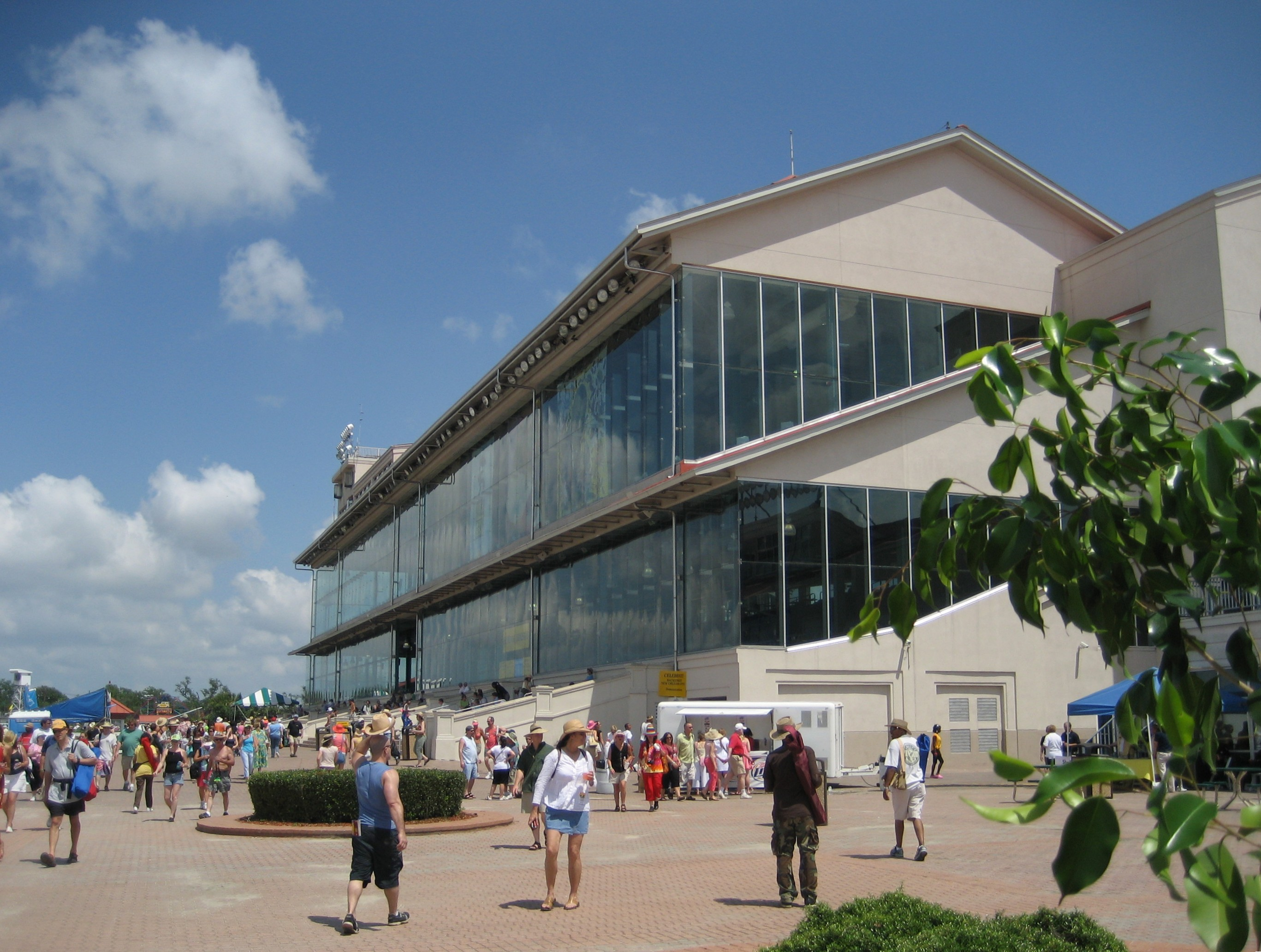
Fair Grounds Race Course

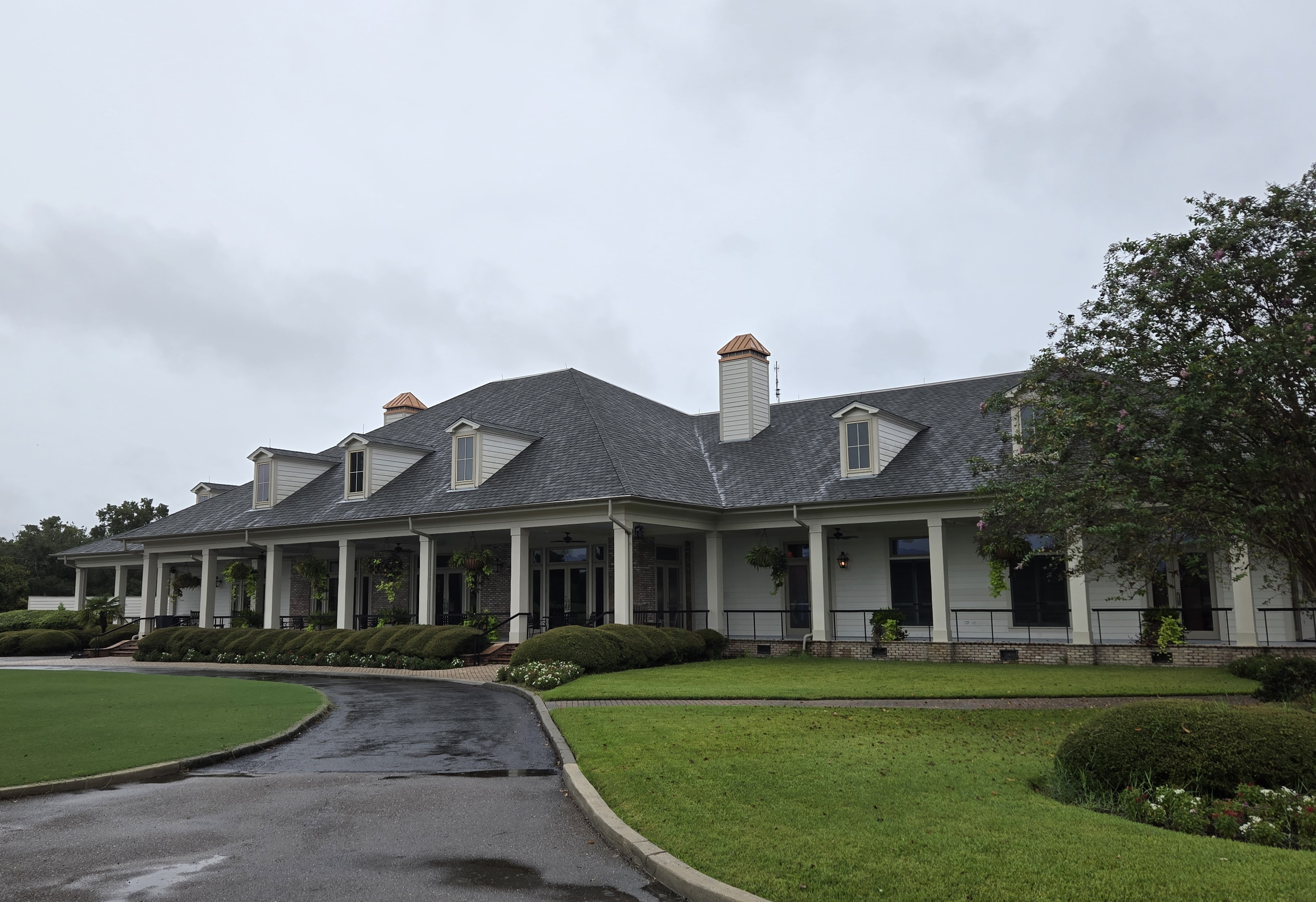
TPC Louisiana clubhouse

== Football ==
=== Professional ===
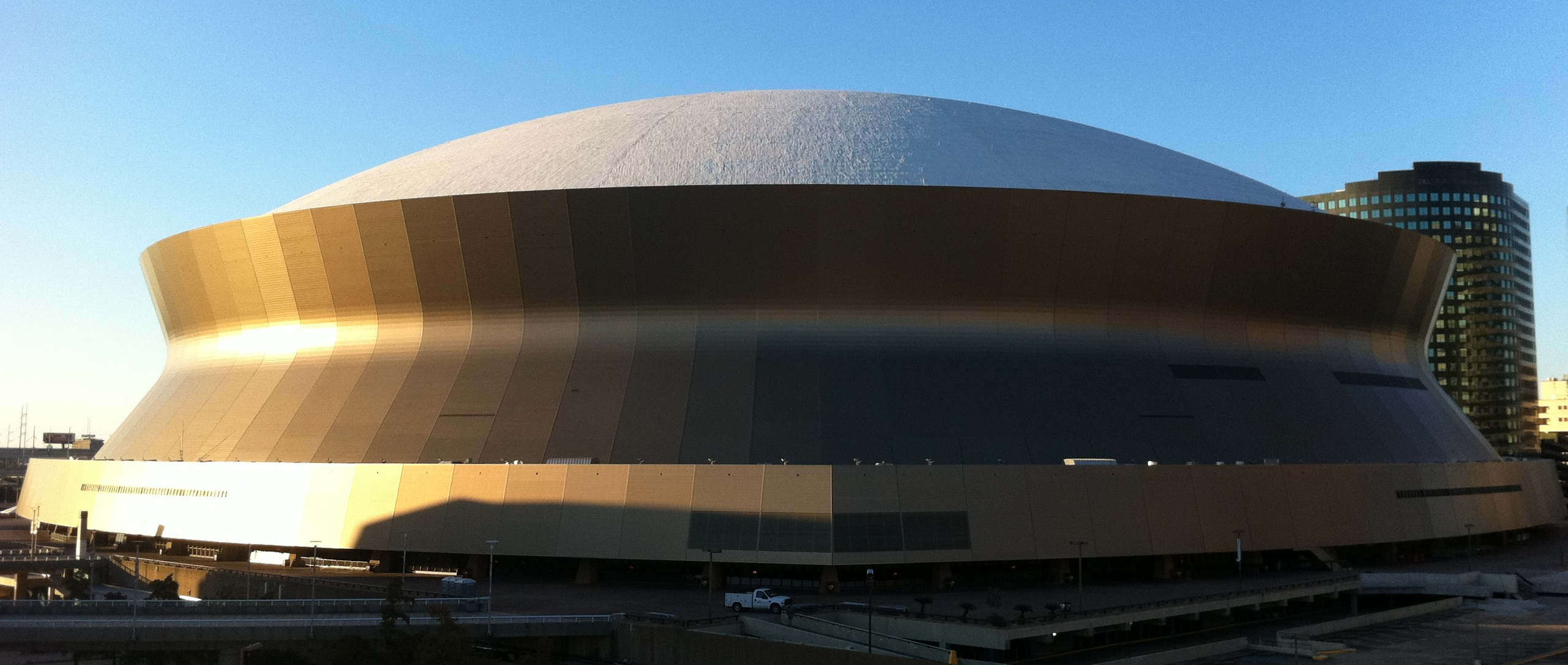
Caesars Superdome

- New Orleans Saints -- The New Orleans Saints, founded in 1967, are one of the 32 teams in the NFL. The home stadium of the Saints is Caesars Superdome. The Saints won Super Bowl XLIV in 2010.

Former football teams in New Orleans include the New Orleans Breakers of the United States Football League (1984) (which became the Portland Breakers), New Orleans Breakers of the United States Football League (2022–2023), New Orleans Night of the Arena Football League (1991–1992), the New Orleans Thunder of the Regional Football League (1999), the Louisiana Jazz of the Women's Football Alliance (2002–2014), the New Orleans VooDoo of the Arena Football League (2004–2005, 2007–2008, and 2010–2015), the New Orleans Jazz football club of the Stars Football League (2011), New Orleans Krewe of the US Women's Football League (2016) and New Orleans Hurricanes of the Women's Football Alliance (2019–2024).

=== Collegiate ===
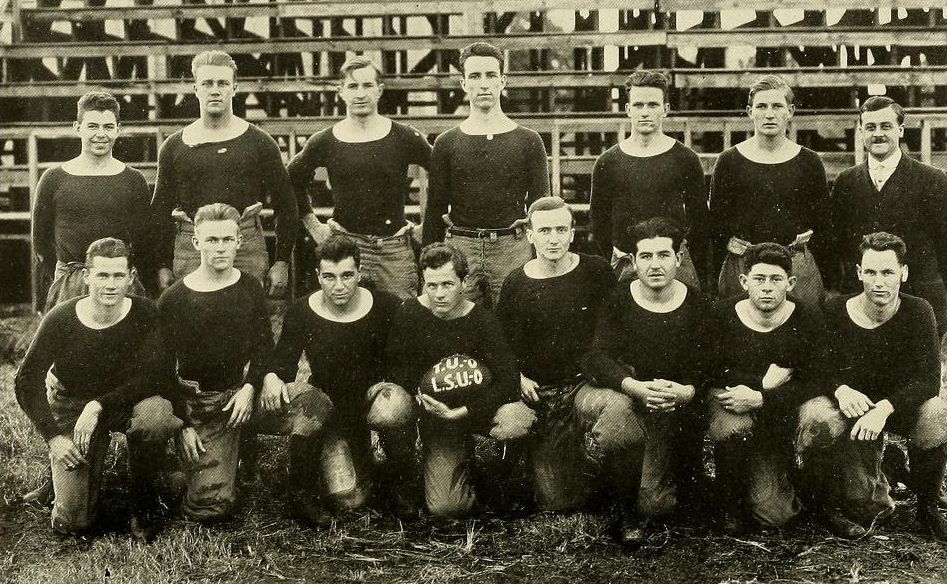
- Tulane University is one of the only D1 Collegiate football teams in New Orleans and has been around for over 100 years.
  Tulane Green Wave -- The Tulane Green Wave football team represents Tulane University in NCAA Division I FBS college football.

Former college football teams in New Orleans include the Dillard Bleu Devils (1935–1965), the Loyola Wolf Pack (1921–1939), the New Orleans Tigers (1914–1935) and the Xavier Gold Rush (1925–1960).

=== Special Football Games ===
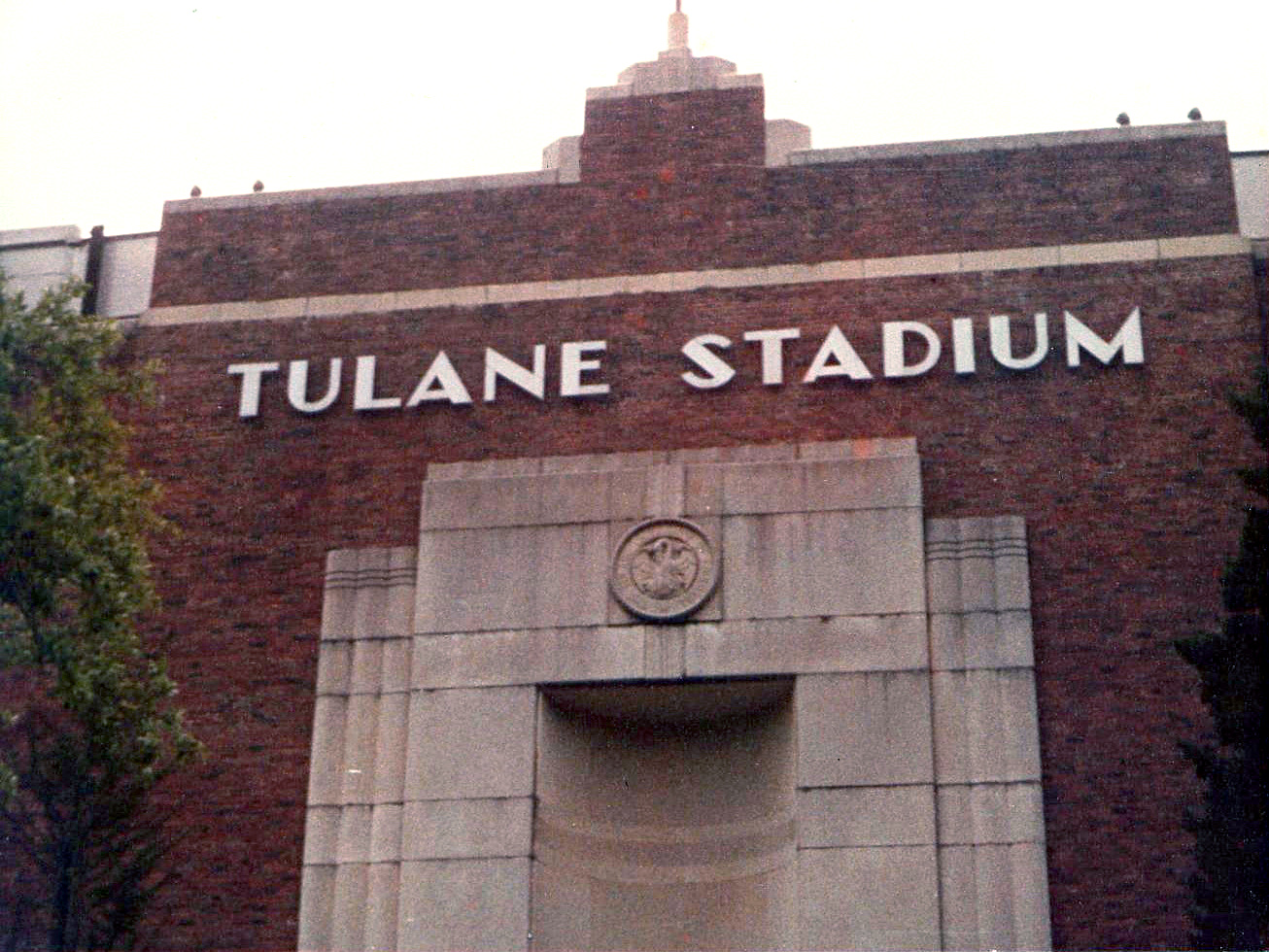
Tulane Stadium was New Orleans' main venue for big games before the construction of the Louisiana Superdome (1979 photo)

- Super Bowl -- More Super Bowls have been played at Caesars Superdome than at any other sports facility: 1978, 1981, 1986, 1990, 1997, 2002, 2013, and 2025. Tulane Stadium also hosted the game in 1970, 1972, and 1975.
- 1976 Pro Bowl -- The 1976 Pro Bowl was the NFL's 26th annual all-star game. The game was played on Monday, January 26, 1976, at the Louisiana Superdome.
- College Football Playoff National Championship Game -- Caesars Superdome hosted the College Football Playoff National Championship game in 2020.
- College Football Playoff semifinal Game -- Caesars Superdome rotates among six sites as the host for a College Football Playoff semifinal game every three years. The Superdome hosted semi-final games in 2015, 2018, 2021, and 2024.
- BCS National Championship Game -- Caesars Superdome rotated with three other sites as the host for the BCS National Championship Game. The Superdome hosted the BCS National Championship Game in 2000, 2004, 2008 and 2012.
- Sugar Bowl -- New Orleans has been home to the annual Sugar Bowl since 1935. Originally played at Tulane Stadium, it has been played in Caesars Superdome since 1975.
- New Orleans Bowl -- New Orleans has been home to the annual New Orleans Bowl since 2001 in Caesars Superdome.
- Bayou Classic -- The Bayou Classic is an annual football game, also played in Caesars Superdome, between the state's two largest historically black universities, Grambling State and Southern University.
- Pelican Bowl -- The Pelican Bowl was an NCAA Division II bowl game played in New Orleans in 1974 and 1975 that pitted the conference champions from the Mid-Eastern Athletic Conference (MEAC) and the Southwestern Athletic Conference (SWAC) to determine the black college football national championship.
- East–West Shrine Game -- The 18th annual East–West Shrine post-season college football all-star game was held in New Orleans on January 1, 1943, due to WWII travel restrictions on the West Coast.
- ArenaBowl -- New Orleans played host to the AFL's championship game in 2007, 2008 and 2012 hosting all games in the New Orleans Arena.

== Basketball ==
=== Professional ===
- New Orleans Pelicans -- The New Orleans Pelicans, founded in 2002 as the New Orleans Hornets, are one of the 30 teams in the NBA. The home arena of the Pelicans is the Smoothie King Center.
- Laketown Squadron -- The Laketown Squadron, founded in 2026, are the NBA G League affiliate of the New Orleans Pelicans. Located in New Orleans, they play their homes games at the Pontchartrain Center.

Former professional basketball teams in New Orleans include the New Orleans Jazz of the NBA (1974–1979) (which became the Utah Jazz) and the New Orleans Buccaneers of the American Basketball Association (1967–1970) (which became the Memphis Pros). Other professional basketball teams include the New Orleans Hurricanes of the Professional Basketball League of America (1947), New Orleans Sports of the Southern Basketball League (1948–1949), New Orleans Pride of the Women's Professional Basketball League (1979–1981) and New Orleans Cougars of the American Basketball Association.

=== Collegiate ===
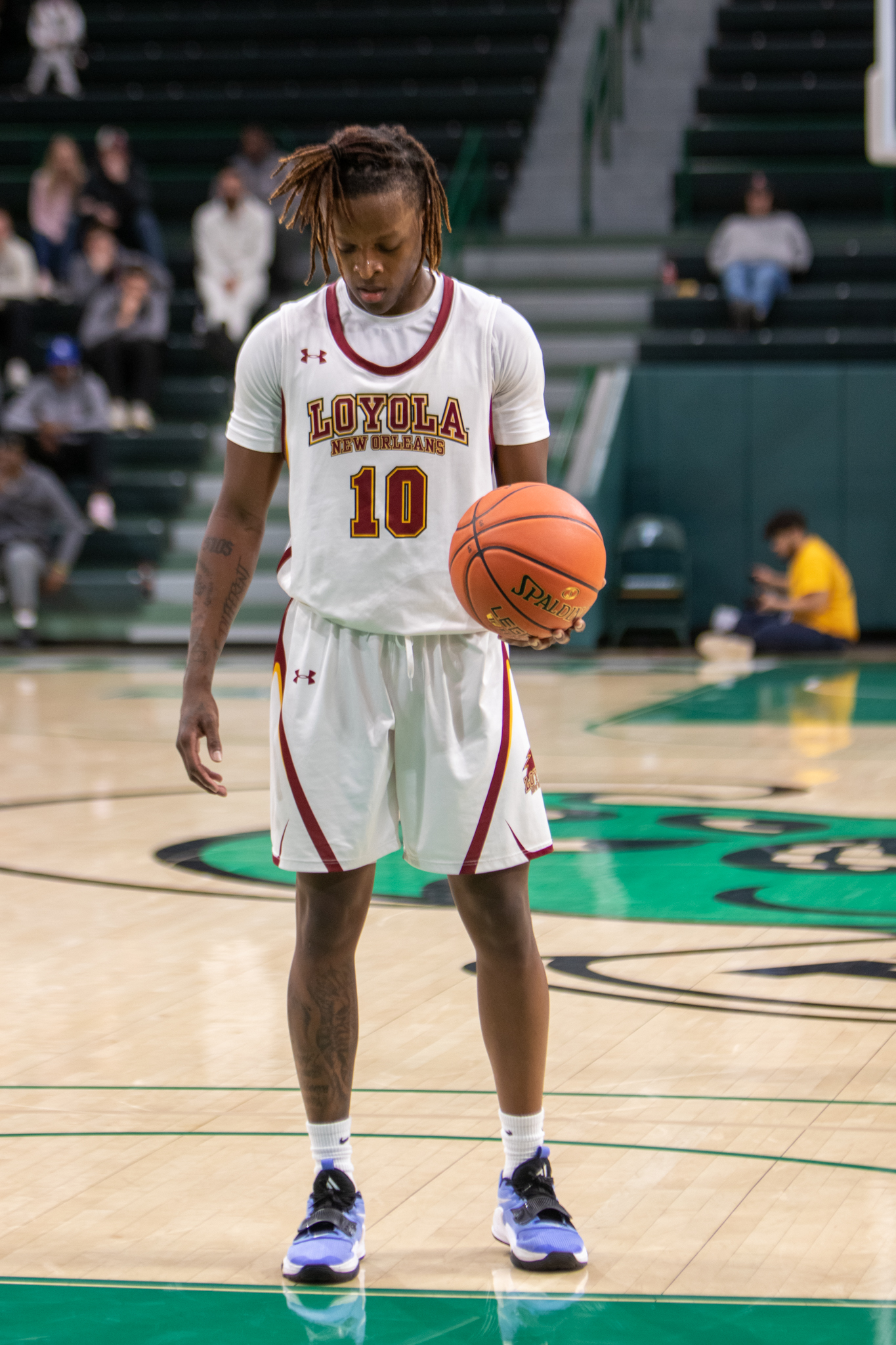
Loyola Wolf Pack guard Brandon Davis prepares to shoot a free throw on March 12, 2022. One of his 19 points along with 11 assist, which helped to prevail the Wolf Pack into the NAIA Round of 16.

- Dillard Bleu Devils and Lady Bleu Devils -- The Dillard Bleu Devils men's basketball team and Dillard Lady Bleu Devils women's basketball team represents Dillard University in the NAIA.
- Loyola Wolf Pack -- The Loyola Wolf Pack men's basketball team and Loyola Wolf Pack women's basketball team represents Loyola University New Orleans in the NAIA.
- LSU New Orleans Privateers -- The LSU New Orleans Privateers men's basketball team and LSU New Orleans Privateers women's basketball team currently represents LSU New Orleans in NCAA Division I college basketball.
- Southern–New Orleans Knights and Lady Knights -- The Southern–New Orleans Knights men's basketball team and Southern–New Orleans Lady Knights women's basketball team represents Southern University at New Orleans in the NAIA.
- Tulane Green Wave -- The Tulane Green Wave men's basketball team and Tulane Green Wave women's basketball team represents Tulane University in NCAA Division I college basketball.
- Xavier Gold Rush and Gold Nuggets -- The Xavier Gold Rush men's basketball team and Xavier Gold Nuggets women's basketball team represents Xavier University of Louisiana in the NAIA.

=== Special Basketball Games ===
- NCAA Men's Final Four -- Caesars Superdome hosted the NCAA college basketball Final Four in 1982, 1987, 1993, 2003, 2012 and 2022.
- NCAA Women's Final Four -- The Women's Final Four has been held in New Orleans in 1991, 2004 and 2013. The New Orleans Arena hosted the Women's Final Four in 2004 and 2013. Lakefront Arena hosted the women's Final Four in 1991.
- NCAA Regular Season Games

Men's:
-- 1989 - LSU Tigers vs. Georgetown Hoyas, Louisiana Superdome. 54,321 - Attendence record for regular season college basketball game
-- 1990 - LSU Tigers vs. Notre Dame Fighting Irish, Louisiana Superdome. 68,000 - Paid attendence record for regular season college basketball game

- NBA All-Star Game -- The NBA All-Star Game was held in New Orleans in 2008, 2014 and 2017 at the Smoothie King Center.
- NBA Preseason Games -- 1991 - Chicago Bulls vs. Denver Nuggets, Louisiana Superdome
- NBA Regular Season Games -- 1984–85 - The Atlanta Hawks played 12 "special" home games in New Orleans at Lakefront Arena during the 1984–85 season.

== Baseball ==
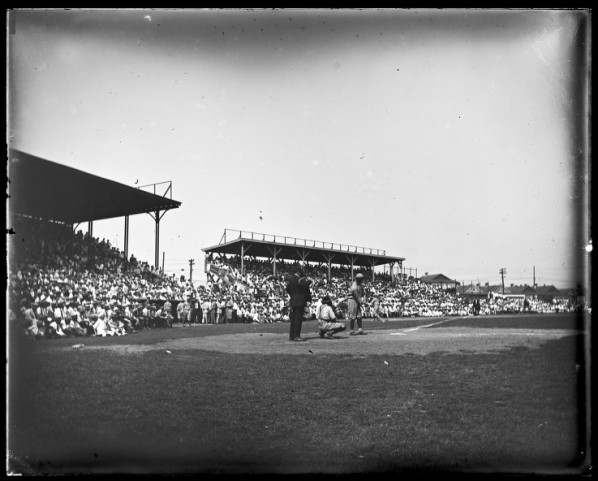
Old Pelican Stadium, aka Heinemann Park, in 1921

Baseball was first played in New Orleans as early as 1859. In that year, amateur baseball leagues played games on the grounds of Delachaise Estates in Uptown New Orleans and the Lone Star Base Ball Club was organized.

There were many innovations in baseball that originated in New Orleans. The first spring training was held in New Orleans in 1870 as the Chicago White Stockings (now Chicago Cubs) traveled to the city to play the Cincinnati Red Stockings, but stayed several weeks to train. The practice of covering the infield with a modified canvas tarpaulin on rainy days was first used in New Orleans in 1887. On April 29, 1887, a recurring Ladies' Day was established to create an environment in the stands free of unsavory characters and conduct, as well as to make baseball a family oriented event. In 1889, issuing "rain checks" for rained out games using a perforated ticket stub was invented in New Orleans by Abner Powell.

=== Professional ===
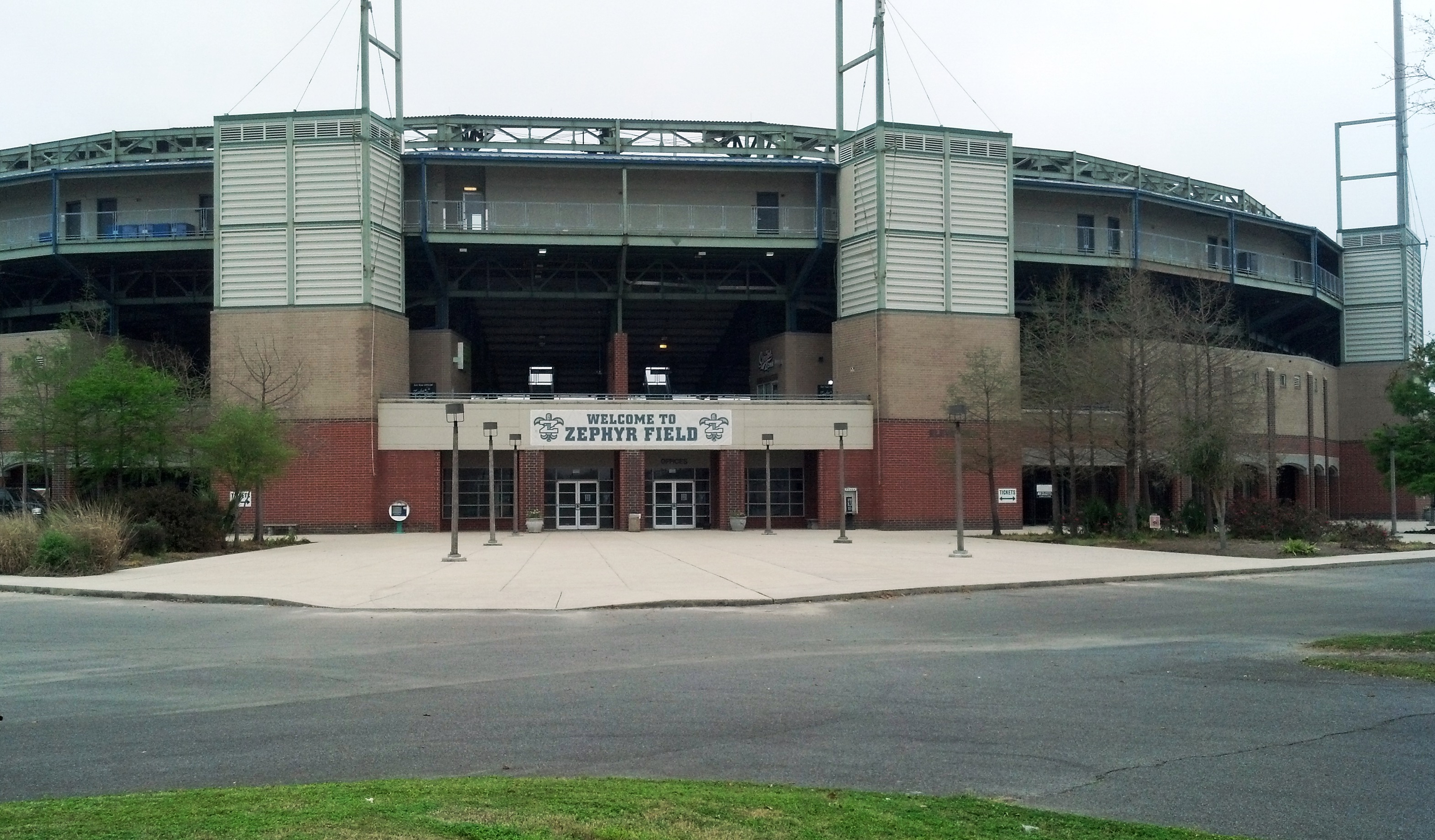
Shrine on Airline

Former baseball teams with the longest tenure in New Orleans include:

- New Orleans Zephyrs/Baby Cakes -- American Association (1993–1997), Pacific Coast League (1998–2019)
- New Orleans Pelicans -- Southern League (1887, 1889, 1898–99), Texas-Southern League (1888), (1890), Southern Association (1892–96, 1901–59), American Association (1977)
- New Orleans Black Pelicans -- pre-Negro leagues (1907–08, 1938), both Negro Southern Leagues (1920, 1926, 1945), Texas–Louisiana League (Negro league) (1931), Negro American League (1951, 1954).

Former baseball teams in New Orleans include:

- Armstrong Secret 9 - Independent Negro leagues (1931)
- Comet Base Ball Club (f. 1860)
- Detroit–New Orleans Stars - Negro league baseball (1960–61)
- Gretna Lookouts - Negro league baseball
- Hancock Base Ball Club (f. 1869)
- Hop Bitters Base Ball Club (1880)
- Hope Base Ball Club (f. 1868)
- Jax Red Sox - Negro Southern League
- Jax Zulo Hippopotamus (New Orleans Zulos) - Independent Negro leagues
- Lone Star Base Ball Club (f. 1859)
- Mandeville Base Ball Club (f. 1869)
- Melpomene White Sox - Negro league baseball
- Meraux Tigers - Negro league baseball
- Metairie Pelicans - Negro league baseball
- New Orleans Acid Iron Earth - Gulf League (f. 1886)
- New Orleans Ads (Caulfield Ads) - Negro Southern League (1920–21, 1935–36)
- New Orleans Algiers Giants - Independent Negro leagues (1926)
- New Orleans Baseball Club - Gulf League (f. 1886)
- New Orleans Black Eagles - Negro league baseball
- New Orleans Black Rappers - pre-Negro leagues (f. 1907)
- New Orleans Blue Rappers - pre-Negro leagues (f. 1907)
- New Orleans Bucks/Kings - South Atlantic League
- New Orleans Cohens - Negro league baseball
- New Orleans Creoles - Negro Southern League (1947–48, 1950–51), Negro Texas League (1949)
- New Orleans Crescents/Unions - Southern League of Colored Base Ballists (f. 1886)
- New Orleans Crescent Stars Independent Negro leagues (1921, 1932–33, 1935–37), Negro Southern League (1922, 1934), Texas Colored League (1923)
- New Orleans Dumonts - Negro league baseball
- New Orleans Eagles - Negro league baseball (1915–16)
- New Orleans Eclipse - pre-Negro leagues (f. 1907)
- New Orleans Expos - Independent (f. 1886)
- New Orleans Jacks/Generals - South Atlantic League
- New Orleans Little Pels - Cotton States League (1912)
- New Orleans Pinchbacks - Negro league baseball
- New Orleans Sports - Independent Negro leagues
- New Orleans Stars - Independent Negro leagues (1924)
- New Orleans White Sox - Independent Negro leagues
- New Orleans Zephyrs/Baby Cakes - Pacific Coast League (1993–2019)
- Pelican Base Ball Club - (1865–67), Louisiana Base Ball Association (1868–74), (1875–79), Crescent City League (1880–84)
- Plaquemine Tigers - Negro league baseball
- Robert E. Lee Base Ball Club - Gulf League (f. 1864, 1869, 1886)
- St. Louis–New Orleans Stars - Negro American League (1940–41)
- Shrewsbury Globetrotters - Negro league baseball
- Slidell Creoles - Negro league baseball
- Southern Base Ball Club (1869)
- Stonewall Base Ball Club (Algiers) (1867)

=== Collegiate ===
- Dillard Bleu Devils -- The Dillard Bleu Devils baseball team represents Dillard University in the NAIA.
- Loyola Wolf Pack -- The Loyola Wolf Pack baseball team represents Loyola University New Orleans in the NAIA.
- LSU New Orleans Privateers -- The LSU New Orleans Privateers baseball team currently represents LSU New Orleans in NCAA Division I college baseball.
- Southern–New Orleans Knights -- The Southern–New Orleans Knights baseball team represents Southern University at New Orleans in the NAIA.
- Tulane Green Wave -- The Tulane Green Wave baseball team represents Tulane University in NCAA Division I college baseball.
- Xavier Gold Rush -- The Xavier Gold Rush baseball team represents Xavier University of Louisiana in the NAIA.

=== Youth ===
- Major League Baseball Urban Youth Academy -- The Major League Baseball Urban Youth Academy has a location in New Orleans at Wesley Barrow Stadium. It is a 650-seat baseball stadium and includes a grass tee-ball and softball field.

=== Special baseball games ===
- Spring Training -- Boston Beaneaters (1884), Boston Red Sox (1925–27), Chicago Cubs/Chicago White Stockings (1870, 1907, 1911–12), Chicago White Sox (1905–06), Cincinnati Reds (1896–97, 1900), Cincinnati Red Stockings (1888), Cleveland Indians (1902–03, 1916–20, 1928–39), Brooklyn Dodgers (1921), New York Giants (1895), New York Yankees (1922–24), Philadelphia Athletics (1908–09), St. Louis Browns (1921)
- Major League Baseball Exhibitions -- 1915 - Detroit Tigers vs. New Orleans Pelicans, 1967 - Cincinnati Reds vs. Cleveland Indians, 1969 - Minnesota Twins vs. New York Mets, 1974 - Atlanta Braves vs. Baltimore Orioles, 1976 - Houston Astros vs. Minnesota Twins, 1980 - Baltimore Orioles vs. New York Yankees, 1981 - New York Yankees vs. New York Mets, Philadelphia Phillies, Pittsburgh Pirates, 1982 - New York Yankees vs. Montreal Expos, Texas Rangers, 1983 - New York Yankees vs. Montreal Expos, Toronto Blue Jays, 1984 - Philadelphia Phillies vs. St. Louis Cardinals, 1989 - Oakland A's vs. San Francisco Giants, 1991 - Los Angeles Dodgers vs. Oakland A's, 1993 - New York Mets vs. Oakland A's, 1994 - Boston Red Sox vs. New York Yankees, 1999 - Chicago Cubs vs. Minnesota Twins and Houston Astros vs New Orleans Zephyrs, 2013 - Miami Marlins vs. New Orleans Zephyrs
- Triple-A All-Star Game -- The 12th annual Triple-A All-Star Game took place on July 14, 1999, at Zephyr Field in the New Orleans suburb of Metairie, Louisiana, home of the Pacific Coast League's New Orleans Zephyrs.
- Busch Challenge/Winn-Dixie Showdown -- College baseball tournament held in the Superdome from 1987 to 1999. LSU, Tulane and University of New Orleans played an in-state team and out-of-state teams from Alabama, Arkansas, California, Florida, Georgia, Mississippi, North Carolina, Oklahoma and Texas in the annual tournament. The in-state team was Louisiana-Lafayette. The out-of-state teams were Alabama, Arkansas, Auburn, Cal State Fullerton, Duke, Florida, Florida State, Georgia, Georgia Southern, Georgia Tech, Houston, Lamar, Miami (FL), Mississippi State, NC State, North Carolina, Oklahoma, Oklahoma State, Ole Miss, Oral Roberts, South Alabama, Southern California, Southern Mississippi, Texas A&M and UCLA.
- Wally Pontiff Jr. Classic -- College baseball game played primarily at Zephyr Field, but also at Alex Box Stadium, Skip Bertman Field from 2004 to 2019 and finally in 2022. The LSU Tigers baseball team played an opponent in the game to honor former LSU Baseball player and Oakland A's draftee, Wally Pontiff Jr., who died at the age of 21 from a genetic heart disorder. In 2004, LSU won the first game of the series vs. Southeastern Louisiana, 9–3. Wally Pontiff Playground in Jefferson Parish, Louisiana is also named after the player.

== Bowling ==
=== Professional ===
- Professional Bowling tournaments -- New Orleans played host to PBA Tour events in 1963, 1964, 1966–1978 and 1988–1990. A PBA Tour sponsored exhibition tournament took place in 2009 and 2010.

=== Collegiate ===
- Tulane Green Wave -- The Tulane Green Wave women's bowling team represents Tulane University in NCAA Division I college bowling.

== Boxing ==
New Orleans has long been home to boxing events.

=== Professional ===
- On May 10, 1870, in the New Orleans suburb of Kennerville, "Gypsy" Jem Mace defeated Tom Allen for what is claimed to be the 1870 heavyweight championship of the bare-knuckle boxing era. This fight is considered by some boxing historians to be the first world heavyweight championship bout. A monument in present-day Kenner, Louisiana marks the spot of the fight near the Mississippi River.

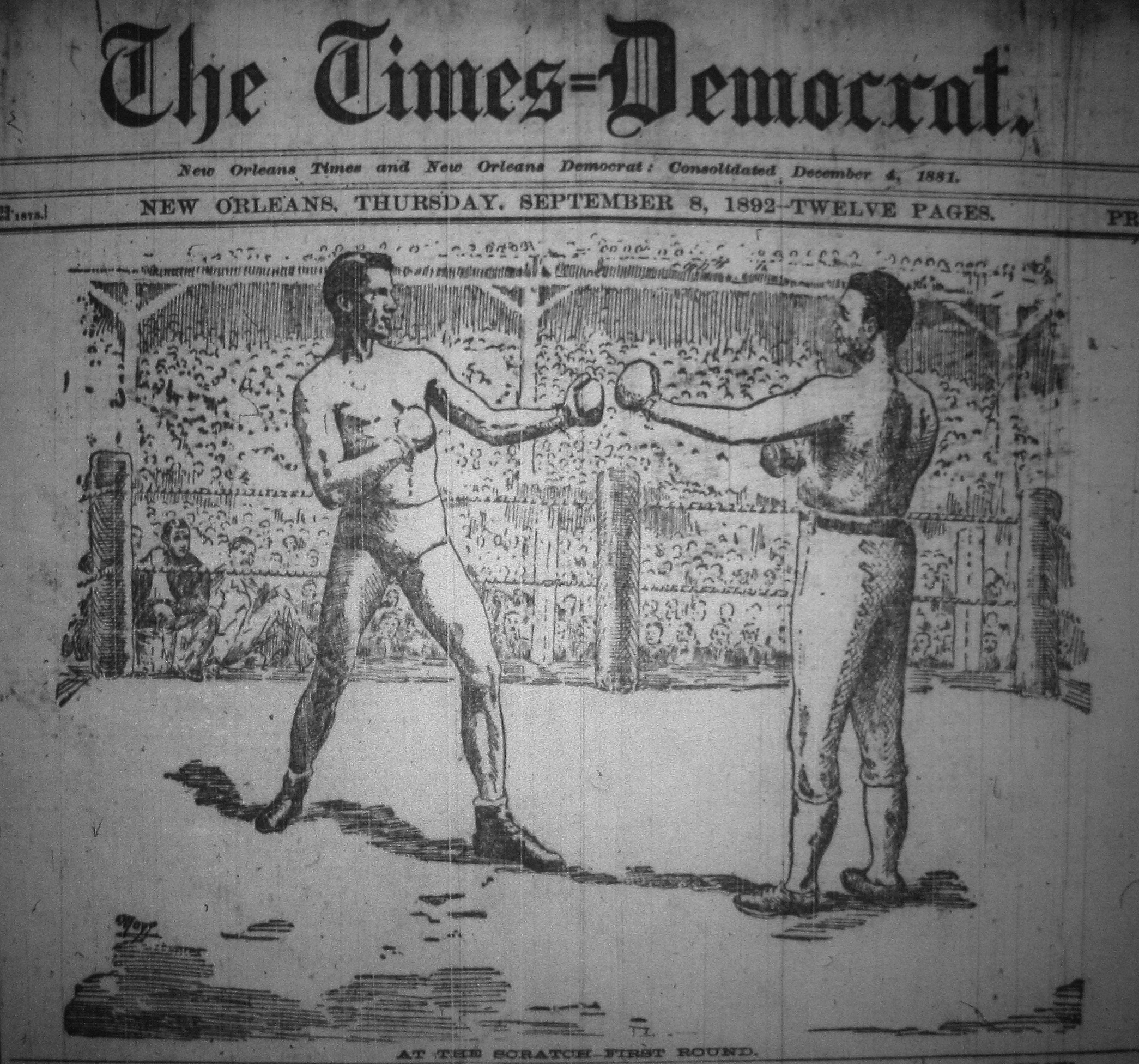
Corbett-Sullivan Prizefight

- The 1892 world heavyweight championship match between John L. Sullivan and Gentleman Jim Corbett is sometimes considered the start of the modern era of boxing. In contrast to earlier bare-knuckle fights held out of doors, the match was held using boxing gloves according to the Marquis of Queensbury rules, indoors at night in the electrically illuminated Olympic Club Arena - called "the epicenter of professional boxing" in the mid-1880s-late 1890s era.
- The Coliseum Arena hosted boxing matches from 1922 until 1959 with the arena closing in 1960. Jack Dempsey, Gene Tunney, Joe Brown, Joe Louis, Sugar Ray Robinson, Willie Pastrano and Ralph Dupas are some of the boxers that fought at the arena.
- On August 24, 1956, Joe Brown defeated Wallace 'Bud' Smith at the Municipal Auditorium in a fifteen-round split decision to win the lightweight championship of the world.
- The Louisiana Superdome hosted the 1978 Leon Spinks vs. Muhammad Ali II fight some called "The Ali rematch" where Muhammad Ali defeated Leon Spinks in front of a crowd of 65,000; it was Ali's last professional win.
- Sugar Ray Leonard vs. Roberto Durán II, also known as the No Más Fight, is one of the most famous fights in boxing history. Taking place on November 25, 1980, at the Louisiana Superdome, it was the second of three bouts between Sugar Ray Leonard and Roberto Durán. In the match, Leonard defeated Duran to regain the WBC Welterweight Championship. The match gained its famous appellation in the end of the eighth round when Durán turned away from Leonard, towards the referee and quit by saying "No más" (Spanish for "No more").
- The Carnival of Champions was held on December 3, 1982, at the Louisiana Superdome. In the first of two co-main events, Wilfredo Gómez would defend his WBC world Jr Featherweight championship against WBC's world Bantamweight champion Lupe Pintor. In the second, Wilfred Benítez defended his WBC world Jr Middleweight championship against the former WBA Welterweight champion of the world Thomas Hearns.
- On September 9, 2000, the New Orleans Arena hosted a light heavyweight title fight between Roy Jones Jr. and Eric Harding. Jones won by TKO in the 10th round.

=== Collegiate ===
Former college boxing teams in New Orleans include the Loyola Wolf Pack and the Tulane Green Wave.

== Cross country ==
=== Collegiate ===
- Dillard Bleu Devils and Lady Bleu Devils -- The Dillard Bleu Devils men's cross country team and Dillard Lady Bleu Devils women's cross country team represents Dillard University in the NAIA.
- Loyola Wolf Pack -- The Loyola Wolf Pack men's cross country team and Loyola Wolf Pack women's cross country team represents Loyola University New Orleans in the NAIA.
- LSU New Orleans Privateers -- The LSU New Orleans Privateers men's cross country team and LSU New Orleans Privateers women's cross country team represents LSU New Orleans in NCAA Division I college cross country.
- Tulane Green Wave -- The Tulane Green Wave men's cross country team and Tulane Green Wave women's cross country team represents Tulane University in NCAA Division I college cross country.
- Xavier Gold Rush and Gold Nuggets -- The Xavier Gold Rush men's cross country team and Xavier Gold Nuggets women's cross country team represents Xavier University of Louisiana in the NAIA.

== Golf ==
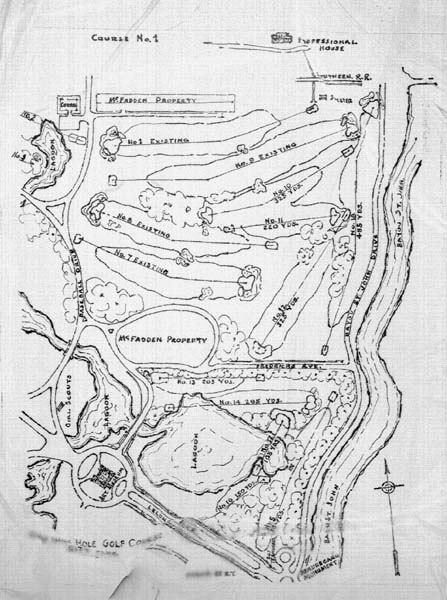
City Park Golf Course Map - 1938

=== Professional ===
- Zurich Classic of New Orleans—The Zurich Classic of New Orleans is a golf tournament held annually on the PGA Tour at the TPC of Louisiana.
- New Orleans Women's Open—The LPGA Tour New Orleans Women's Open golf tournament was held in New Orleans in 1952, 1953 and 1954.
- Southern (Spring) Open—The Southern (Spring) Open was a golf tournament on the PGA Tour, played only in 1922 at the New Orleans Country Club.

=== Collegiate ===
- Loyola Wolf Pack -- The Loyola Wolf Pack women's golf team represents Loyola University New Orleans in the NAIA.
- LSU New Orleans Privateers -- The LSU New Orleans Privateers men's golf team currently represents LSU New Orleans in NCAA Division I college golf.
- Tulane Green Wave -- The Tulane Green Wave women's golf team represents Tulane University in NCAA Division I college golf.

== Gymnastics ==
=== Collegiate ===
Former college gymnastics teams in New Orleans include the women's team for the LSU New Orleans Privateers.

=== Special Gymnastics Meets ===
- The USSR National Gymnastics team performed at the Louisiana Superdome in 1976. The event featured Olga Korbut, Nelli Kim, Nicolai Andrianov and Alexander Dityatin.
- The 1995 U.S. Gymnastics National Championships were held at the Louisiana Superdome.
- The AAU Junior Olympics gymnastics competition was held in the Louisiana Superdome in 1996.
- The 2019 SEC gymnastics championship will be held at the Smoothie King Center.

== High school sports ==
New Orleans has produced many championship teams at the LHSAA and national levels. Schools have earned high national rankings in football, basketball, baseball and soccer. The annual Louisiana Prep Classic state championship football games organized by the Louisiana High School Athletic Association have been held at the Mercedes-Benz Superdome since 1981.

== Horse racing ==
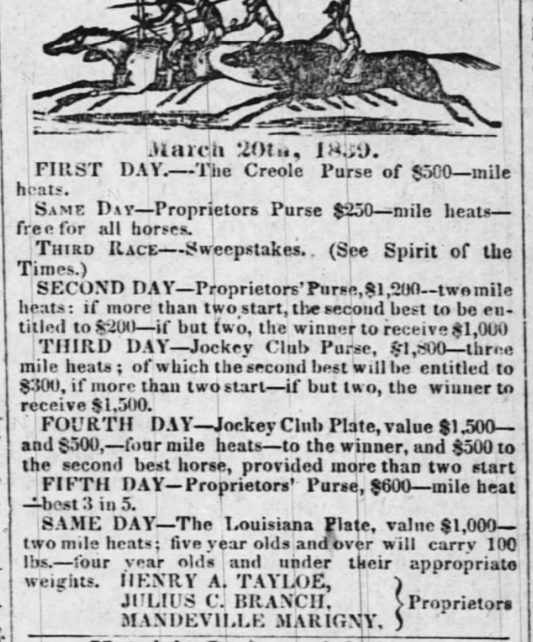
Horse racing on the current site of the Fair Grounds Race Course in 1839

New Orleans is home to the Fair Grounds Race Course, the nation's third-oldest thoroughbred track. The most prestigious race held at the track is the Louisiana Derby, a Grade II stakes prep for the Kentucky Derby. The race course opened in 1852 as the Union Racetrack and later became the Creole Racetrack.

Former horse racing tracks in the New Orleans area include Eclipse Race Course (opened 1837), Metairie Course (1838–1872), Bingaman Race Track, City Park Race Track (1905–1920), Jefferson Park Race Track (1918–1934) and Jefferson Downs Racetrack (1959–1992).

== Ice hockey ==
=== Professional ===
- New Orleans Brass -- The New Orleans Brass was a former ice hockey team in New Orleans from 1997 to 2002.

== Ironman 70.3 ==
- Ochsner Ironman 70.3 New Orleans -- The Ochsner Ironman 70.3 New Orleans, also known as a Half-Ironman or a 70.3 (miles), is one of a series of middle-distance triathlon races organized by the World Triathlon Corporation (WTC). The event comprises a 1.2 mile swim, a 56-mile bike ride and 13.1 mile run.

== Lacrosse ==
The Allstate Sugar Bowl Collegiate Lacrosse Series was held at Pan American Stadium from 2011 to 2015.

The Allstate Sugar Bowl High School Lacrosse Classic first held in 2007 has been played at multiple locations in the New Orleans metropolitan area such as City Park, Lafreniere Park, LaSalle Park and Pan American Stadium.

- 2007: LaSalle Park
- 2008: LaSalle Park
- 2009: City Park
- 2010: Lafreniere Park
- 2011: Lafreniere Park
- 2012: Lafreniere Park
- 2014: Lafreniere Park

== Mixed martial arts ==
- UFC 16 -- UFC 16 took place on March 13, 1998, at the Pontchartrain Center in the New Orleans suburb of Kenner, Louisiana. It featured the first ever UFC Lightweight tournament (for fighters under 170 lb), as well as a Middleweight Championship bout, a Heavyweight and a Middleweight Superfight, and two alternate bouts in case of tournament injury.
- UFC 18 -- UFC 18 took place on January 8, 1999, at the Pontchartrain Center in the New Orleans suburb of Kenner, Louisiana. The event featured a UFC Lightweight Championship (now known as the Welterweight Championship) bout and six other bouts. UFC 18 was technically part two of what the UFC called "The Road To The Heavyweight Title", a tournament, spanning four events, held to crown the new UFC Heavyweight Champion after the title was vacated by Randy Couture.
- UFC 27 -- UFC 27 took place on September 22, 2000, at the Lakefront Arena in the New Orleans. The event featured UFC legend Dan "The Beast" Severn returning to the promotion after more than 3 years on the independent scene to face off against top heavyweight contender Pedro Rizzo. Severn was the fan favorite, but he submitted to leg kicks from "The Rock" in the first round. Also, former UFC Heavyweight Champion Maurice Smith took on the first KOTC Heavyweight Champion Bobby Hoffman. Smith won via majority decision. There were 2 preliminary fights and 6 main card fights.
- UFC Fight Night: Shields vs. Ellenberger (also known as UFC Fight Night 25) was a mixed martial arts event held by the Ultimate Fighting Championship on September 17, 2011, at the Ernest N. Morial Convention Center in New Orleans, Louisiana.
- UFC Fight Night: Boetsch vs. Henderson (also known as UFC Fight Night 68) was a mixed martial arts event held on June 6, 2015, at the Smoothie King Center in New Orleans, Louisiana.

== Motorsports ==
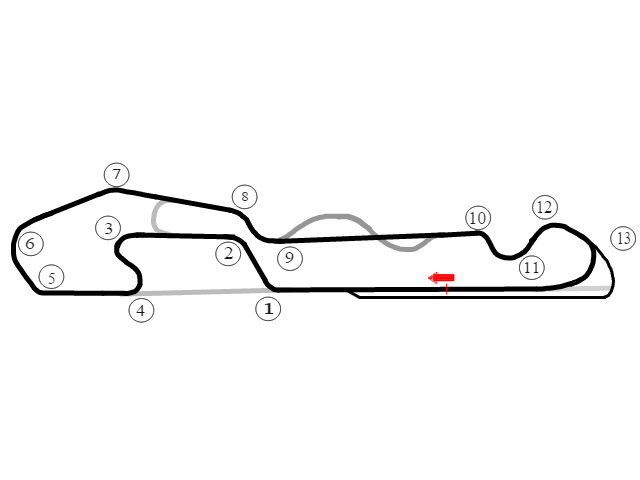
NOLA Motorsports Park

The NOLA Motorsports Park is a road race track in Avondale, Louisiana, approximately twenty minutes from downtown New Orleans. The north track circuit and kart circuit opened in 2011.

New Orleans has hosted several auto races:

- AMA Supercross—New Orleans has hosted AMA Supercross races in the Mercedes-Benz Superdome in 1977–1980, 1998–2002, 2009, and 2012.
- Grand Prix du Mardi Gras—In 1991, 1992, and 1995, New Orleans was home to the Grand Prix du Mardi Gras. The IMSA sports car races took place on two street circuits downtown. In 1991, streets near the riverfront were used for the race course. In 1992 and 1995, a course that ran around the Superdome was used.
- Triumph Big Kahuna New Orleans—The AMA Pro Racing Superbike Championship race was held October 5–7, 2012 at the NOLA Motorsports Park.
- Cooper Tires WinterFest—The U.S. F2000 Winterfest race featuring Indy Lights, Pro Formula Mazda and F2000 cars was held February 21–22, 2014 at the NOLA Motorsports Park.
- Indy Grand Prix of Louisiana—The inaugural IndyCar Series race was held on April 12, 2015, at NOLA Motorsports Park.

== Professional bull riding ==
Professional Bull Riders, Inc. (PBR), a professional bull riding organization held competitions in the New Orleans Arena in 2000–2003, 2007 and 2010.

== Quadball ==
- New Orleans Curse -- The New Orleans Curse were an amateur team of the Major League Quadball established in 2016 and ceased operations following the 2025 season.

== Roller derby ==
- Big Easy Rollergirls -- The Big Easy Rollergirls is the name of a female roller derby league in New Orleans. The league plays at the Human Performance Center.
- New Orleans Brass Roller Derby -- New Orleans Brass Roller Derby is the name of a male roller derby team in New Orleans.

== Rugby ==
=== Professional ===
- New Orleans Gold—The New Orleans Gold were a franchise of Major League Rugby (MLR). The Gold's first season was in 2018 and the team played their home matches at Joe Zimmerman Stadium. For the 2020 season, the Gold moved to the Gold Mine on Airline and played there until disbanding following the 2025 Major League Rugby season.

=== Amateur/Semi-Pro ===
- New Orleans Rugby Football Club (NORFC) -- The New Orleans Rugby Football Club, founded in 1973, is a men's rugby union club serving the greater New Orleans area. NORFC competes in Division I of the Deep South Rugby Football Union of USA Rugby. NORFC has won two club rugby national championships.
- New Orleans Halfmoons -- The New Orleans Halfmoons is a women's rugby team and member of USA Rugby. It is one of the oldest women's teams in the United States, and has hosted the annual "Throw Me Something, Rugger!" Mardi Gras Rugby tournament the weekend before Fat Tuesday since 1980. The team practices at the City Park Practice Track.

Former rugby clubs in New Orleans include the Crescent City Rugby Football Club (1976–1979), New Orleans Gold of the Major League Rugby. (2017–2025).

=== Collegiate ===
- Loyola Wolf Pack -- The Loyola Wolf Pack men's rugby team and Loyola Wolf Pack women's rugby team represents Loyola University New Orleans in the NAIA.

== Running ==
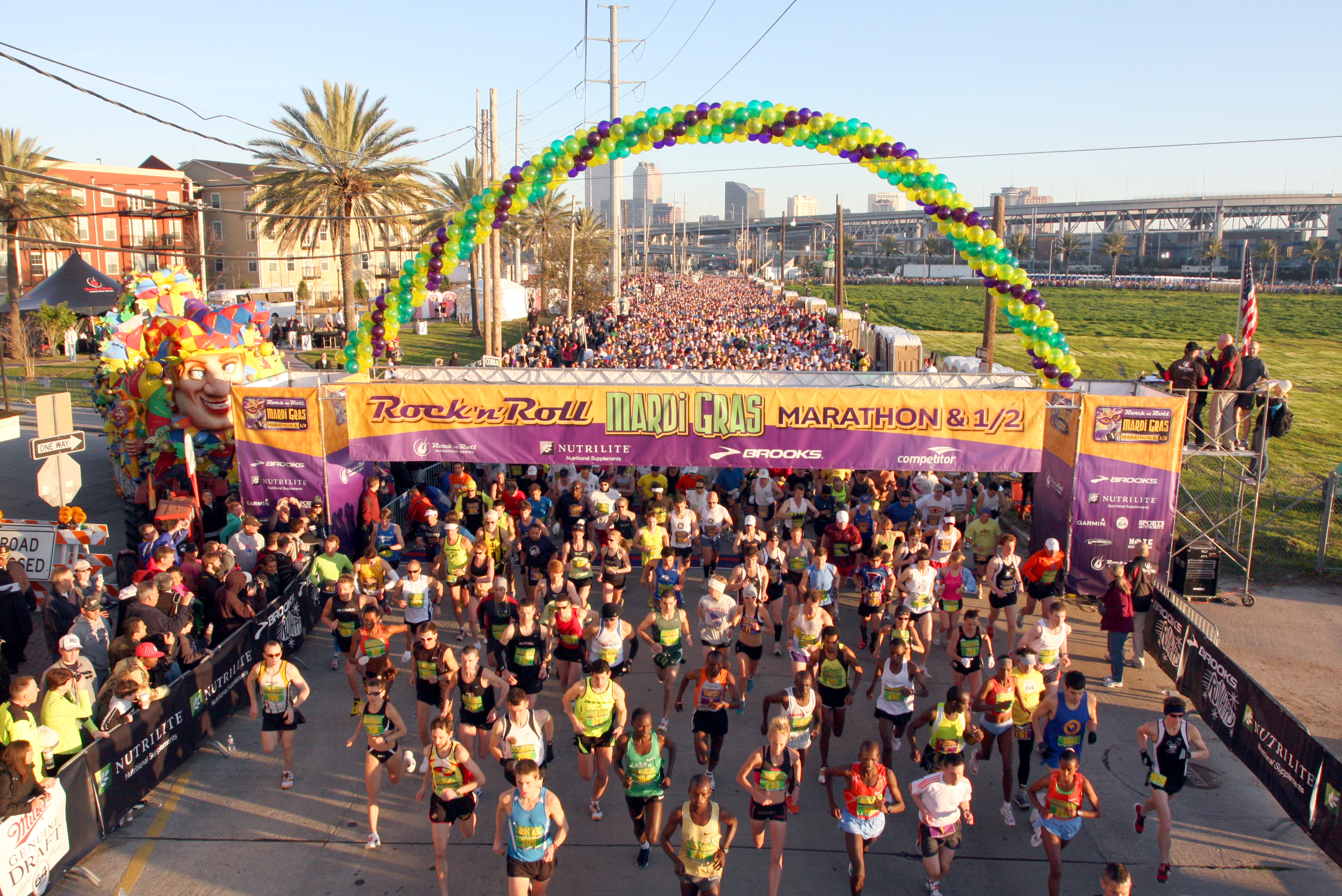
Rock 'n' Roll Mardi Gras Marathon

- Crescent City Classic -- The Crescent City Classic is a 10k race held every April.
- Crescent City Fall Classic -- The Crescent City Classic is a 5k race held every November.
- Crescent Connection Bridge Run -- The Crescent Connection Bridge Run is a 4-mile race held in June.
- Rock 'n' Roll Mardi Gras Marathon -- The Rock 'n' Roll Mardi Gras Marathon (formerly the Mardi Gras Marathon) is held in February.

== Soccer ==
New Orleans was one of the first cities in the world where modern soccer was played. Beginning in 1858 as a community sport, the sport became popular among many athletic clubs in the late 19th century. A semi-professional league consisting of some of the best players in the world, several of whom later played for first division teams in England and Scotland, briefly used the old grounds on what would become Pelican Stadium.

=== Professional ===
- New Orleans Jesters -- The New Orleans Jesters are a soccer team in the National Premier Soccer League (NPSL).

Former professional soccer teams in New Orleans include the New Orleans Storm of the USL A-League (1993–1999) and FC New Orleans of the National Premier Soccer League as a provisional member (2012).

=== Amateur/Semi-Pro ===
Leagues

- ISLANO -- The International Soccer League Association New Orleans (ISLANO) is a men's semi-professional soccer league and part of the Louisiana Soccer Association.

Teams

- Motagua New Orleans competes in the Gulf Coast Premier League and ISLANO.

Former amateur/semi-pro soccer teams in New Orleans include the Louisiana Fire of the Gulf Coast Premier League (2016–2017).

=== Collegiate ===
Former college soccer teams in New Orleans include the women's team for the LSU New Orleans Privateers and the women's team for the Tulane Green Wave.

=== Special Soccer Games ===
Chicago Fire Soccer Club vs. Real C.D. España -- An international friendly match between Major League Soccer's Chicago Fire Soccer Club and Honduran soccer club Real C.D. España was played at Tad Gormley Stadium on February 4, 2012.

New England Revolution vs. C.D. Olimpia -- An international friendly match between Major League Soccer's New England Revolution and Honduran soccer club C.D. Olimpia was played at Tad Gormley Stadium on March 25, 2007.

Honduras national team vs. Tampa Bay Rowdies -- On March 28, 1982, in a World Cup tune-up match, the Honduras national football team played the Tampa Bay Rowdies of the North American Soccer League to a 1–1 draw at Tad Gormley Stadium.

== Softball ==
=== Collegiate ===
Former college softball teams in New Orleans include the LSU New Orleans Privateers.

== Swimming and diving ==
=== Collegiate ===
- Loyola Wolf Pack -- The Loyola Wolf Pack men's swim team and Loyola Wolf Pack women's swim team represents Loyola University New Orleans in the NAIA.
- Tulane Green Wave -- The Tulane Green Wave women's swimming and diving team represents Tulane University in NCAA Division I swimming and diving.

Former college swimming and divings teams in New Orleans include the LSU New Orleans Privateers.

== Tennis ==
=== Professional ===
- New Orleans Sun Belt Nets—The New Orleans Sun Belt Nets were a franchise of World Team Tennis (WTT). The Nets moved to New Orleans for the 1978 season and played their home matches in the Louisiana Superdome. Following the 1978 season, the Nets announced that the team would fold.

=== Collegiate ===
- Loyola Wolf Pack -- The Loyola Wolf Pack men's tennis team and Loyola Wolf Pack women's tennis team represents Loyola University New Orleans in the NAIA.
- LSU New Orleans Privateers -- The LSU New Orleans Privateers men's tennis team and LSU New Orleans Privateers women's tennis team represents LSU New Orleans in NCAA Division I college tennis.
- Tulane Green Wave -- The Tulane Green Wave men's tennis team and Tulane Green Wave women's tennis team represents Tulane University in NCAA Division I college tennis.
- Xavier Gold Rush and Gold Nuggets -- The Xavier Gold Rush men's tennis team and Xavier Gold Nuggets women's tennis team represents Xavier University of Louisiana in the NAIA.

=== Special Tennis Matches ===
- New Orleans Grand Prix—The New Orleans Grand Prix was a men's tennis tournament played in New Orleans from 1978 to 1980. The event was part of the Grand Prix tennis circuit.
- Virginia Slims of New Orleans—New Orleans played host to the Virginia Slims Women's Tennis Association (WTA) tournament in 1984 through 1988.

== Track and Field ==
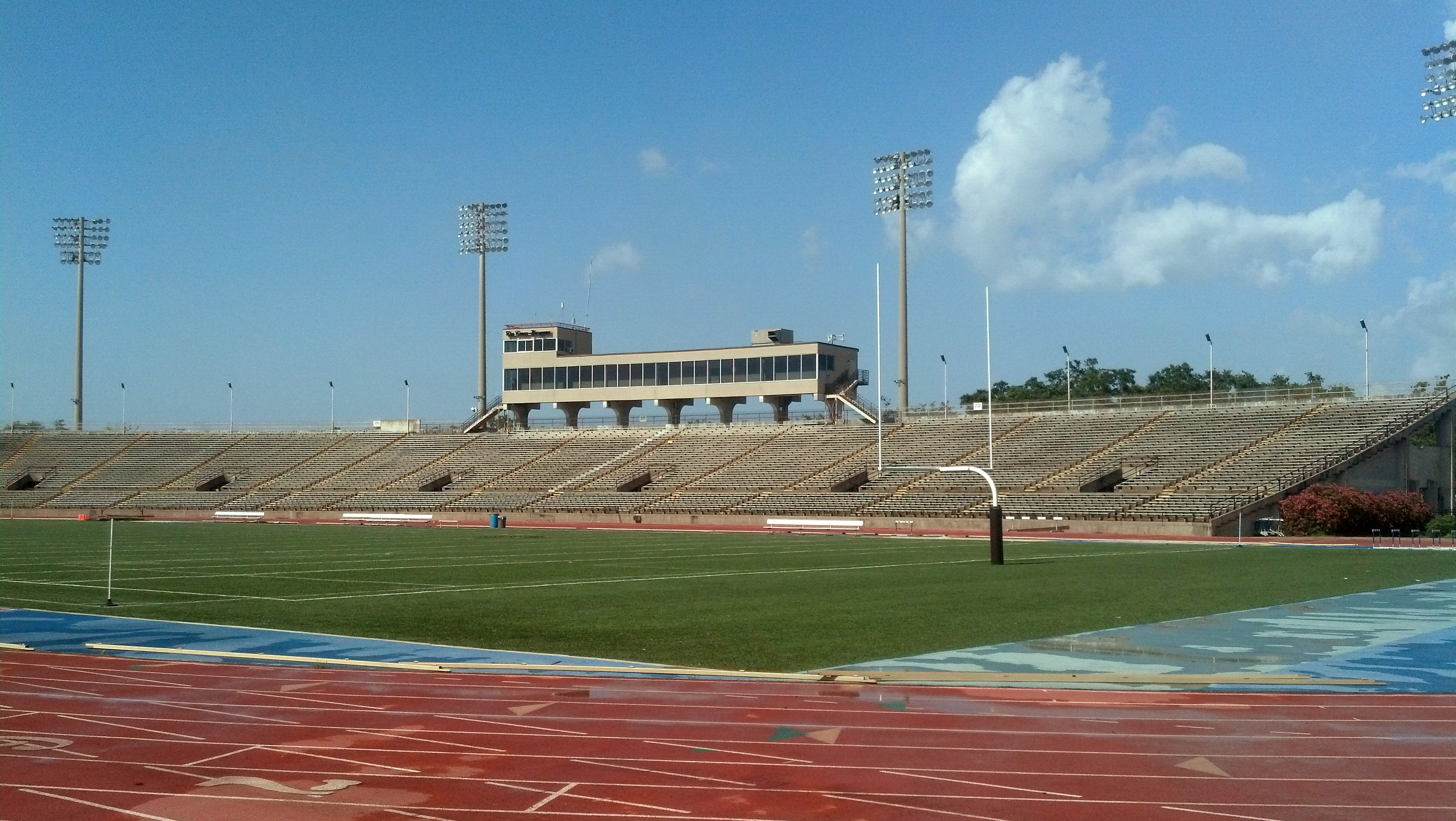
Tad Gormley Stadium

=== Collegiate ===
- Dillard Bleu Devils and Lady Bleu Devils -- The Dillard Bleu Devils men's track and field team and Dillard Lady Bleu Devils women's track and field team represents Dillard University in the NAIA.
- Loyola Wolf Pack -- The Loyola Wolf Pack men's track and field team and Loyola Wolf Pack women's track and field team represents Loyola University New Orleans in the NAIA.
- LSU New Orleans Privateers -- The LSU New Orleans Privateers men's track and field team and LSU New Orleans Privateers women's track and field team represents LSU New Orleans in NCAA Division I college track and field.
- Tulane Green Wave -- The Tulane Green Wave men's track and field team and Tulane Green Wave women's track and field team represents Tulane University in NCAA Division I college track and field.
- Xavier Gold Rush and Gold Nuggets -- The Xavier Gold Rush men's track and field team and Xavier Gold Nuggets women's track and field team represents Xavier University of Louisiana in the NAIA.

Former college track and field teams in New Orleans include the Southern–New Orleans Knights and Lady Knights.

=== Special Track and Field Meets ===
- 1992 United States Olympic track and field trials—The 1992 United States Olympic track and field trials were held at Tad Gormley Stadium from June 19–28. It was organised by USA Track and Field and served as the national championships in track and field for the United States. The results of the event determined qualification for the United States at the 1992 Summer Olympics held in Barcelona, Spain.
- 1998 USA Outdoor Track and Field Championships—The 1998 USA Outdoor Track and Field Championships took place between June 17–21 at Tad Gormley Stadium.

== Volleyball ==
=== Beach Volleyball ===
==== Collegiate ====
- Loyola Wolf Pack -- The Loyola Wolf Pack women's beach volleyball team represents Loyola University New Orleans in the NAIA.
- LSU New Orleans Privateers -- The LSU New Orleans Privateers women's beach volleyball team represents LSU New Orleans in NCAA Division I college beach volleyball.
- Tulane Green Wave -- The Tulane Green Wave women's beach volleyball team represents Tulane University in NCAA Division I college beach volleyball.

==== Special Beach Volleyball Matches ====
- AVP New Orleans Open—The AVP Pro Beach Volleyball Tour held the men's and women's New Orleans Open in 2015 and 2016. The AVP Pro Beach Volleyball Tour held the men's New Orleans Open in 1989, 1990, 1992 and 1999.
- WPVA New Orleans—The WPVA Pro Beach Volleyball Tour held women's tournaments in New Orleans in 1993, 1994 and 1995.

=== Indoor Volleyball ===
==== Collegiate ====
- Dillard Lady Bleu Devils -- The Dillard Lady Bleu Devils women's volleyball team represents Dillard University in the NAIA.
- Loyola Wolf Pack -- The Loyola Wolf Pack women's volleyball team represents Loyola University New Orleans in the NAIA.
- LSU New Orleans Privateers -- The LSU New Orleans Privateers women's volleyball team represents LSU New Orleans in NCAA Division I college volleyball.
- Southern–New Orleans Lady Knights -- The Southern–New Orleans Lady Knights women's volleyball team represents Southern University at New Orleans in the NAIA.
- Tulane Green Wave -- The Tulane Green Wave women's volleyball team represents Tulane University in NCAA Division I college volleyball.
- Xavier Gold Nuggets -- The Xavier Gold Nuggets women's volleyball team represents Xavier University of Louisiana in the NAIA.

==== Special Indoor Volleyball Matches ====
- Women's Volleyball Final Four—The 2002 NCAA Division I Women's Volleyball final four was held at the New Orleans Arena in December 2002.

== Water sports ==
=== Fishing tournaments ===
- Bassmaster Classic — is a fishing tournament that was held in the New Orleans area in 1999, 2001, 2003 and 2011.
- City Park Big Bass Fishing Rodeo — is a fishing tournament founded in 1946. It is held annually in New Orleans' City Park and is the country's oldest freshwater fishing tournament.

=== Powerboat racing ===
Offshore powerboat racing has had a long history in New Orleans, Louisiana. Races have been held in either Lake Pontchartrain or on the Mississippi River. The most commonly held race was the Popeyes Offshore Grand Prix held annually from 1983 to 1991. Other powerboat races took place in 1980, 1981, 1982, 2002, 2003 and 2008. New Orleans was also the home port for the Popeyes Offshore race team from 1980 to 1990. The race team was formed by Al Copeland Sr., the founder of Popeyes Fried Chicken Restaurants and Copeland's Restaurants. He was a six-time U.S. national champion and world champion in 1985 and 1986.

=== Yachting ===
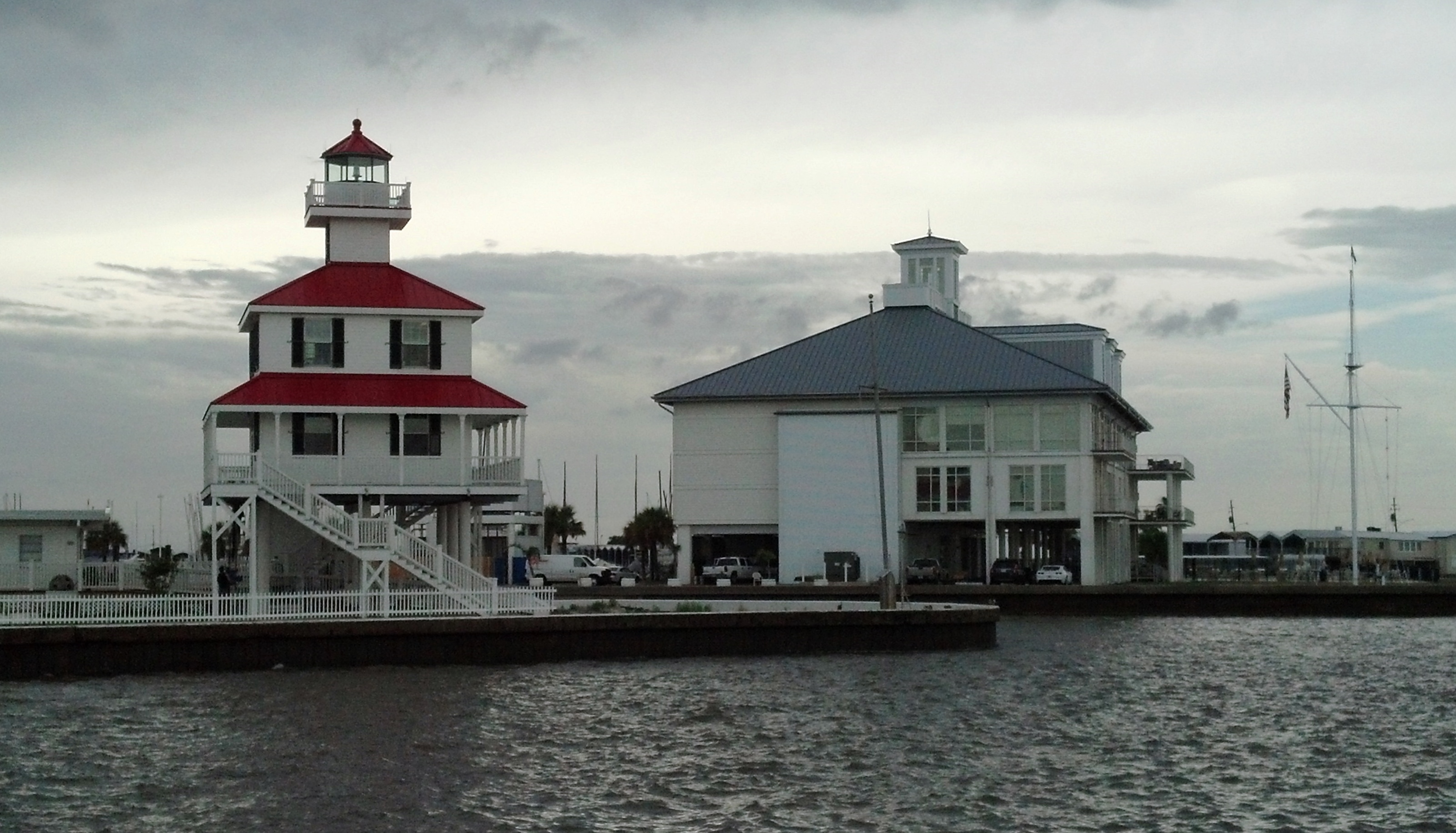
Southern Yacht Club

New Orleans is home to the New Orleans Yacht Club and Southern Yacht Club, both of which are located at West End on the shore of Lake Pontchartrain. Southern Yacht Club was established in 1849 and is the second oldest yacht club in the United States.

Regattas include:

- Mardi Gras Race Week — New Orleans Yacht Club large One Design regatta held on Lake Pontchartrain.
- Race to the Coast — Southern Yacht Club Regatta since 1849. Oldest continuously running point to point regatta in the Western Hemisphere United States.
- Sugar Bowl Regatta — has been held since 1934. The sailing competition is divided into two separate phases, over four two-day periods, beginning in late November and concluding on New Year's Eve.

== Wrestling ==
=== Collegiate ===
Former college wrestling teams in New Orleans include the Tulane Green Wave.

=== Special Wrestling Meets ===
- In 1996, the Louisiana Superdome hosted the AAU Junior Olympics wrestling competition.
- The 2004 Armed Forces Wrestling Championship was held in the New Orleans area.

== See also ==
- List of sports teams in Louisiana
