= City Park Practice Track =

Polyurethane track in City Park in New Orleans

Coordinates: 29°59′22″N 90°5′58″W

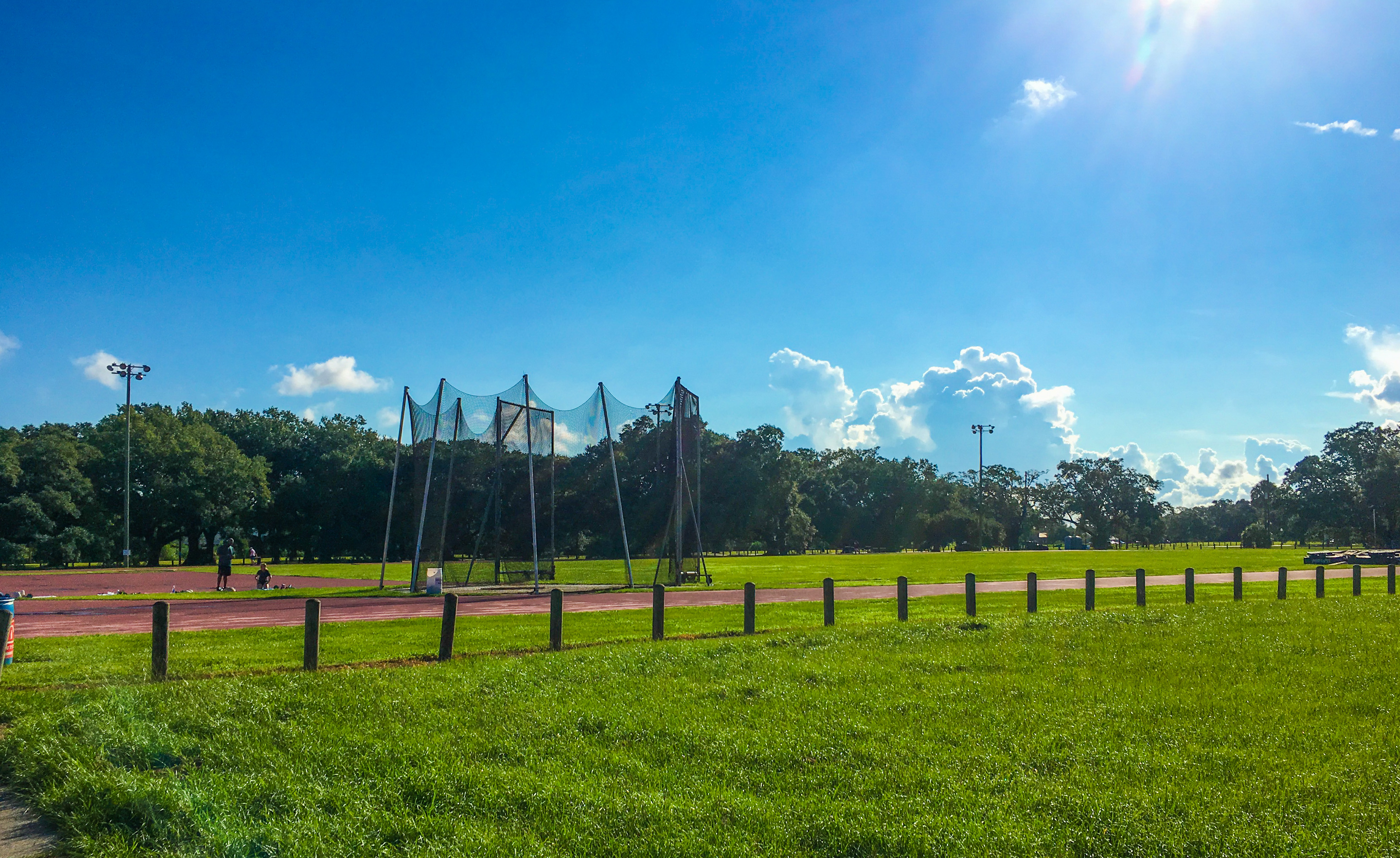
- City Park Practice Track, August 2018
- Interactive map of City Park Practice Track
- Location: City Park, New Orleans
- Owner: New Orleans City Park
- Operator: New Orleans City Park
- Surface: Polyurethane

Construction
- Opened: 1992
- Renovated: 2006

The City Park Practice Track or City Park Track is a 400-meter polyurethane track located in City Park in New Orleans. It was originally built as the practice/auxiliary track for the 1992 U.S. Olympic Track & Field Trials for the 1992 Summer Olympics. The track which is located adjacent to Tad Gormley Stadium, was renovated in 2006.

It is home to the Jesuit Blue Jays, 2021-2023 XC state champions, and the University of New Orleans. The facility is also used during track and field meets held at Tad Gormley Stadium. The track is the finish line for the Crescent City Fall Classic road race. It is also the practice facility for the New Orleans Halfmoons rugby club.
