= Pontiff Playground =

Park in Metairie, Louisiana, United States

Coordinates: 29.979075°N 90.139604°W

Wally Pontiff Jr. Playground
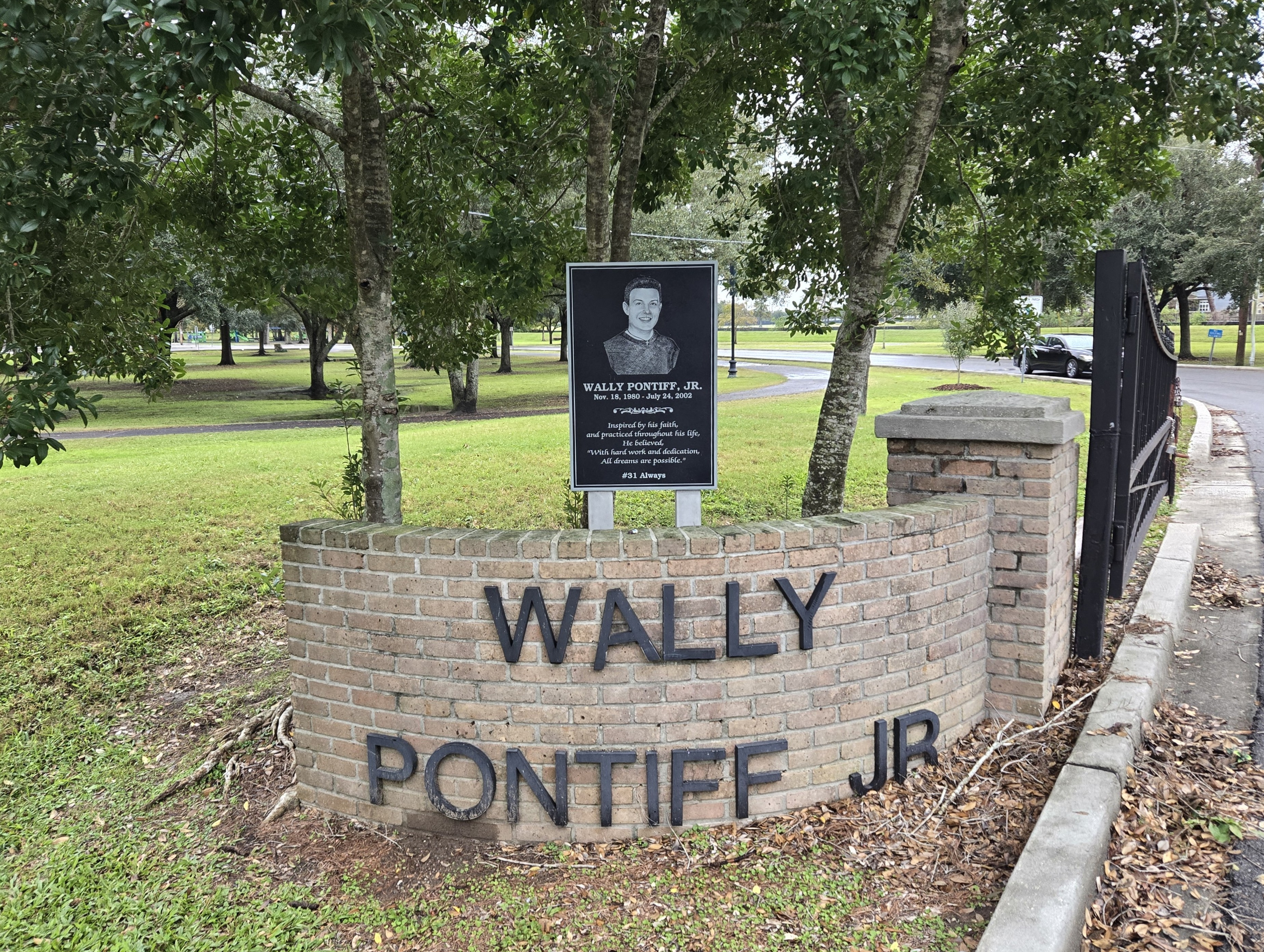
- Interactive map of Wally Pontiff Jr. Playground
- Location: Metairie, Louisiana
- Opened: 1952
- Etymology: Wally Pontiff, Jr.
- Website: jprd.com/parks/eastbank/metairie/pontiff-playground/

Wally Pontiff Jr. Playground, formerly Metairie Playground, is a Jefferson Parish public playground located at 1521 Palm Street in Metairie, Louisiana. It is Jefferson Parish's oldest public playground.

== History ==
=== Origins ===
Development of Metairie Playground began in 1945, following the end of World War II and during a time of civic progress in Jefferson Parish. The playground was dedicated in 1952.

=== Namesake ===
The playground was renamed for Wally Pontiff Jr. on June 28, 2003 after his passing from a heart abnormality on July 24, 2002 at the age of 21. He was the captain of the LSU baseball team at the time of his passing and was heading into his senior year at LSU after being drafted by the Oakland Athletics in the 21st round of the 2002 Major League Baseball Draft. Pontiff attended Jesuit High School and played youth baseball at Metairie Playground. The LSU Baseball team played the Wally Pontiff Jr. Classic, in memory of Wally Pontiff Jr. every year from 2004 to 2019 and finally in 2022.

=== Effects of Hurricane Katrina ===
Pontiff Playground was flooded in August 2005 during Hurricane Katrina, which ruined the gymnasium. After the storm, Jefferson Parish built an earthen berm around it to hold water in future emergencies.

== Sports ==
=== Baseball ===
The playground offers multiple baseball fields for team and recreational use.

=== Basketball/Volleyball ===
The gymnasium is used for basketball games, volleyball games and other recreational uses.

=== Cross country ===
The Pontiff Playground cross country course is a 3-mile/4.83 km cross country course in and around Pontiff Playground.

=== Football/Soccer ===
The playground has two football/soccer fields for team and recreational use. The playground was the home football venue for the Metairie High School Yellowjackets from 1952 to 1954. The largest crowds were standing room only against Kenner High School in 1952 and against Behrman High School in 1954.

=== Softball ===
The playground offers multiple softball fields for team and recreational use.

=== Tennis ===
Tennis is played at the Pontiff Playground tennis courts.

=== Track and field ===
A running track used for track and field meets is located in the playground.

== Playground amenities ==
The playground contains six baseball diamonds, two football fields, one track, two tennis courts, and a gymnasium. In addition to these sports facilities a spray fountain, meditation labyrinth, meeting center, picnic shelters, playground equipment, dog park and bird sanctuary are located in the facility.

=== Development Timeline ===
Date	Action
1945	Development of Metairie Playground initiated
1952	Dedication of Metairie Playground
June 28, 2003	Dedication ceremony held at 10 a.m. renaming Metairie Playground the Wally Pontiff, Jr. Playground
August 29, 2005	Hurricane Katrina strikes New Orleans, severely damaging Pontiff Playground
July 31, 2007	The Friends of Pontiff Playground, Inc. announces reconstruction master plan

== Gallery ==
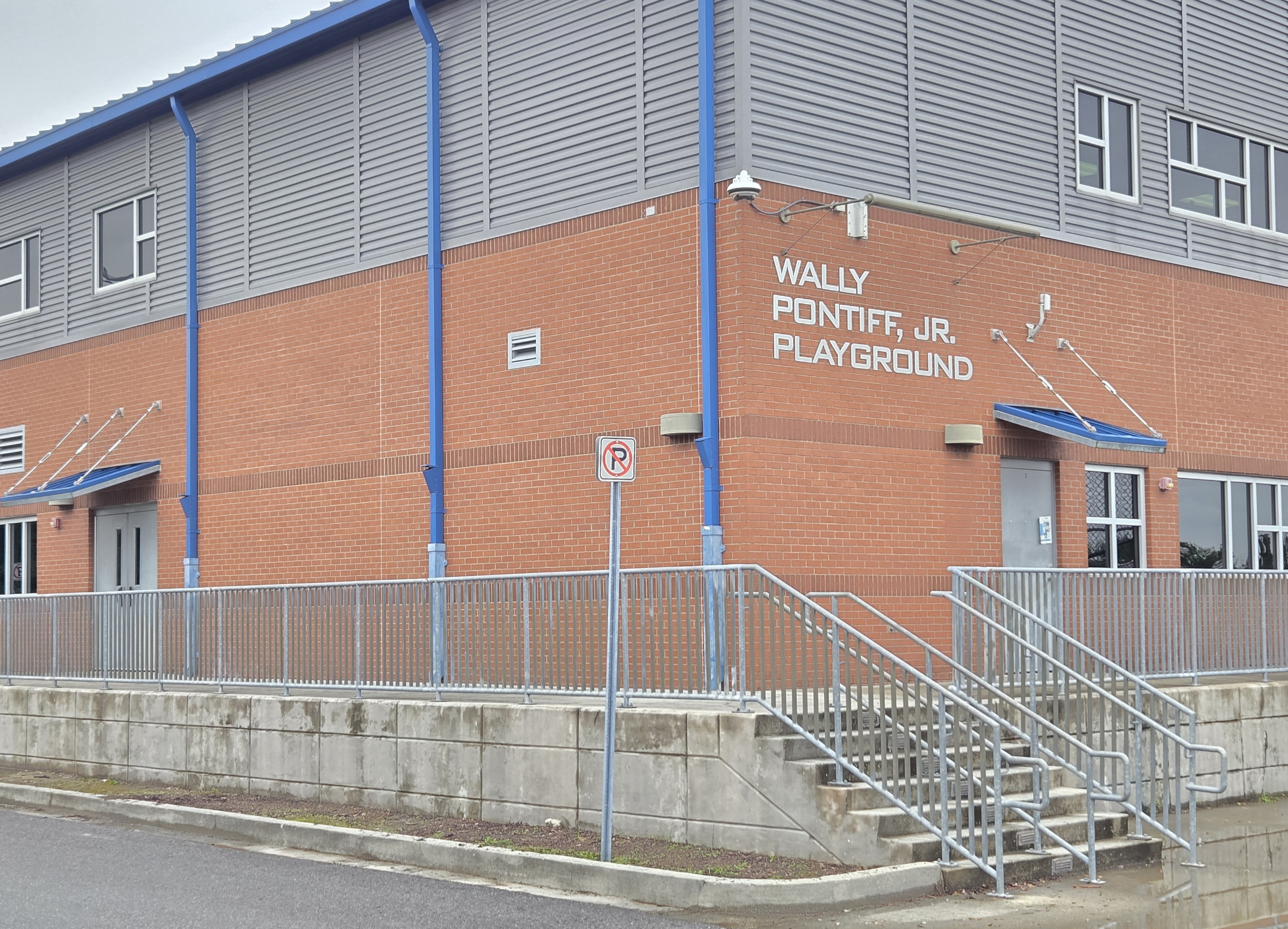
Wally Pontiff Jr. Playground Gymnasium

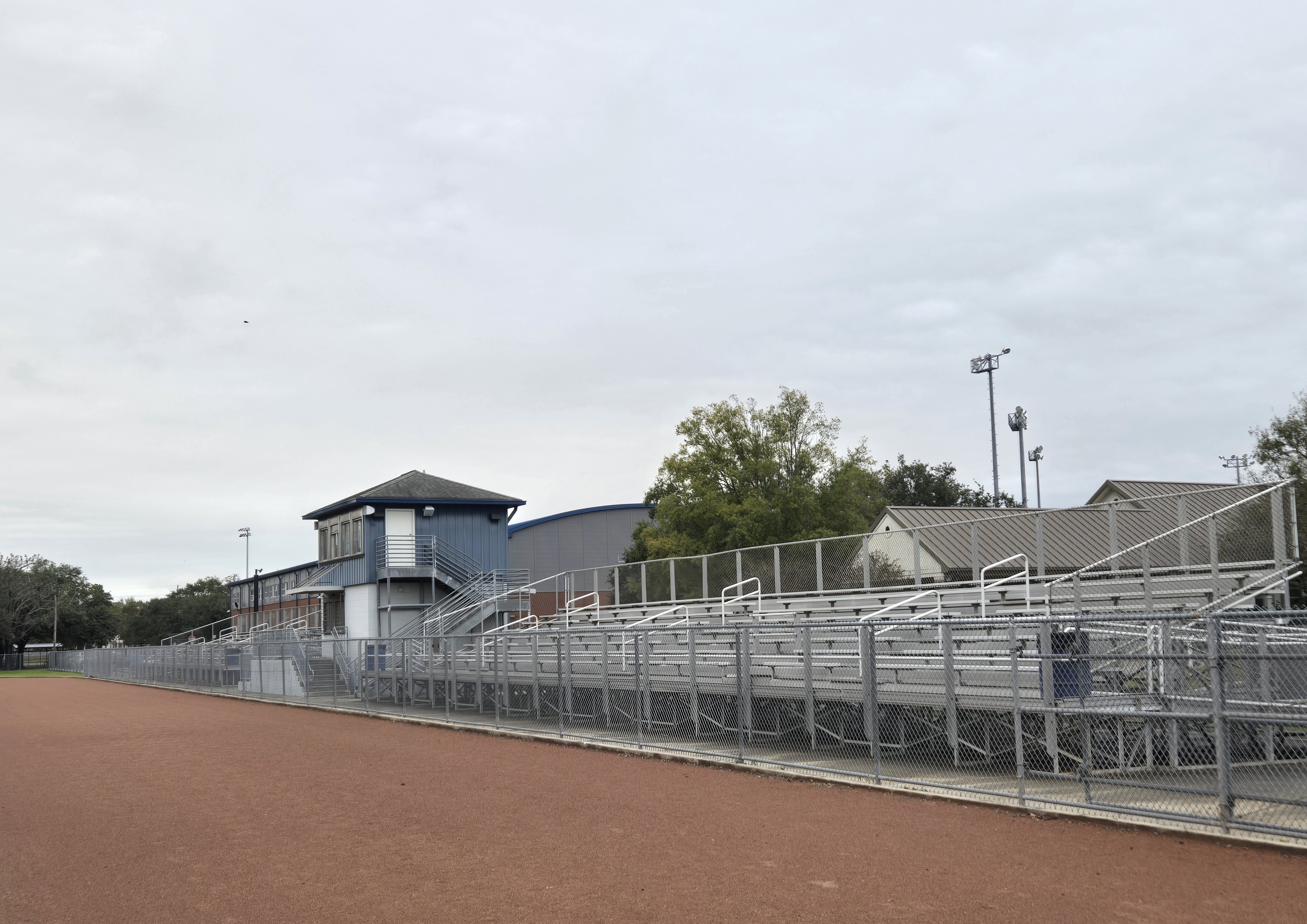
Wally Pontiff Jr. Playground Stadium

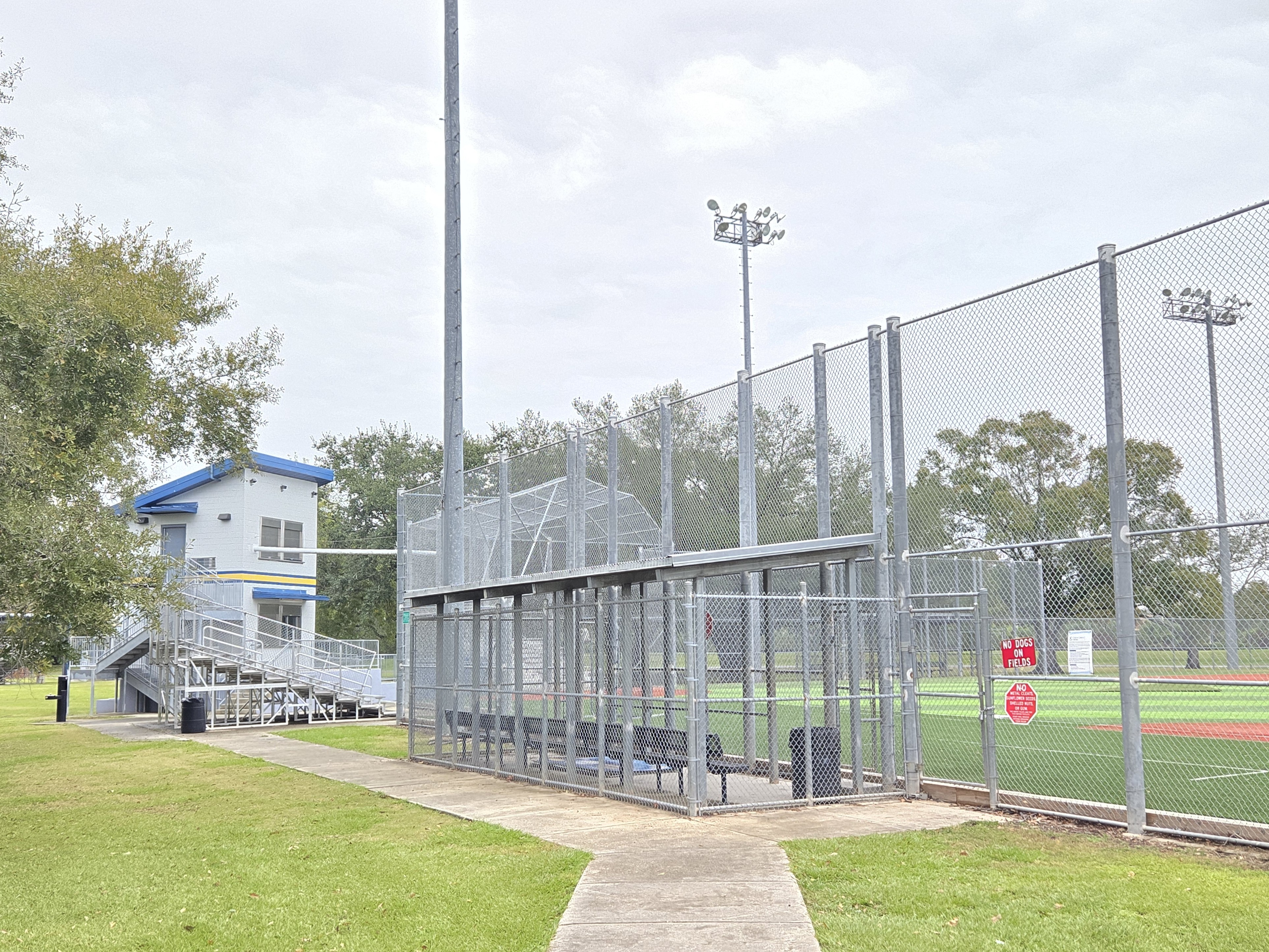
Wally Pontiff Jr. Playground Ball Fields

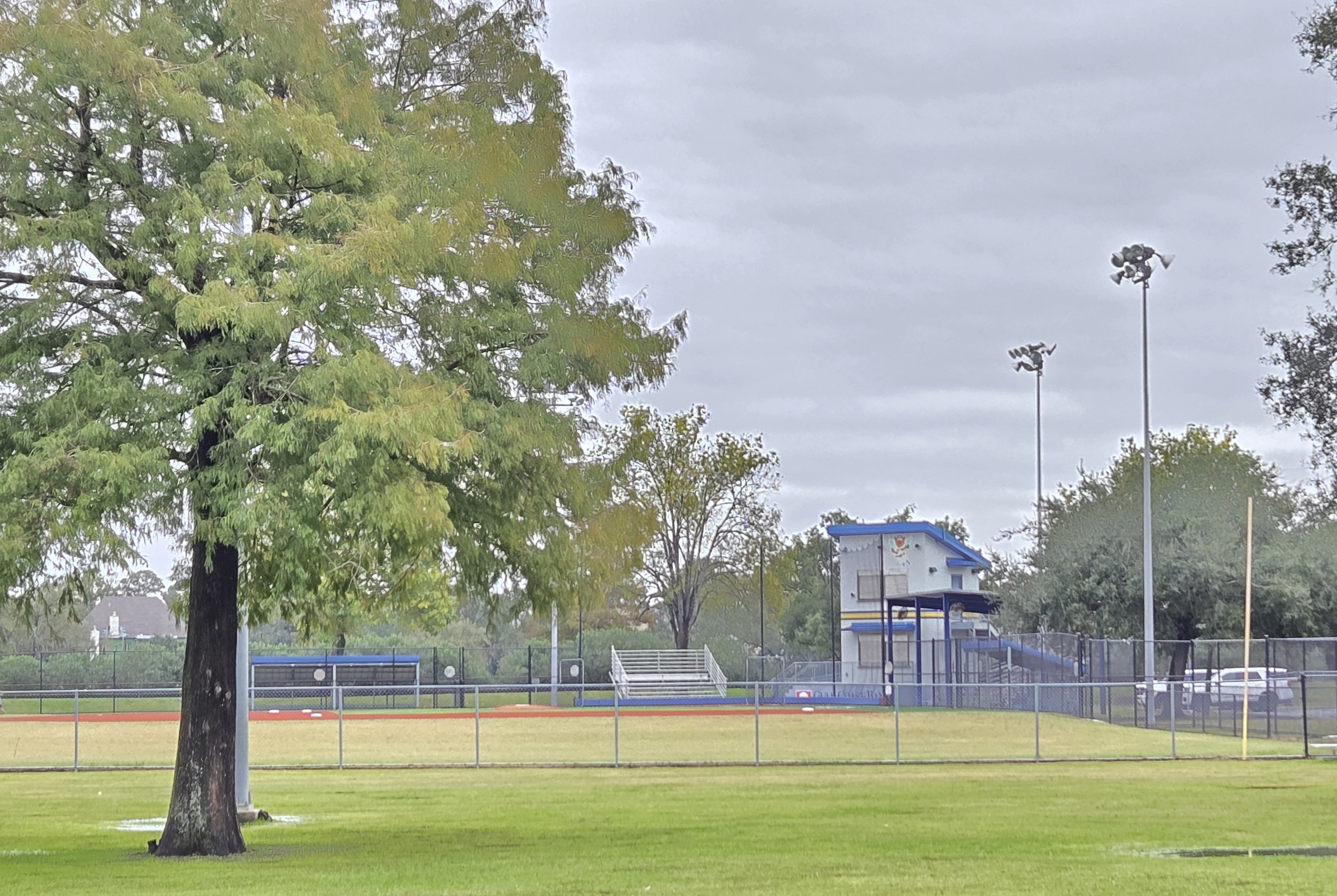
Wally Pontiff Jr. Playground Ball Fields

== See also ==
- Metairie
- Jefferson Parish
