= Crescent Connection Bridge Run =

- Date: October
- Location: New Orleans, Louisiana, United States
- Event type: Road
- Distance: 4-mile
- Website: www.ccc10k.com/crescent-connection-bridge-run.html

The Crescent Connection Bridge Run is a 4-mile race held in New Orleans, Louisiana, United States. The race is held in June on the Crescent City Connection bridge over the Mississippi River.
