= Crescent City Classic =

- Date: Saturday before Easter
- Location: New Orleans, Louisiana (United States)
- Event type: Road
- Distance: 10 kilometers (6.2 mi)
- Primary sponsor: LCMC Health
- Established: 1979
- Course records: M: 27:10 (2002) (Kenya) Sammy Kipketer; F: 30:27 (2005) (Kenya) Isabella Ochichi
- Website: www.ccc10k.com

The Crescent City Classic is an annual 10-kilometer race held in New Orleans, Louisiana, United States. Mac DeVaughn founded the Classic and held the first race in 1979. The race was originally held in the Fall, but the race is now held the Saturday before Easter.

== Course ==
The race is held on a point-to-point course that starts in the Central Business District near the Superdome, and follows city streets (Poydras Street, Peters Street, Decatur Street, Esplanade Avenue, City Park Avenue) and into City Park, where the official finish line is located on Lelong Ave. just before the New Orleans Museum of Art.

== Past winners ==
Key: Course record USATF Men's 10K championships

Edition	Year	Men's winner	Time (m:s)	Women's winner	Time (m:s)
1st	1979	Frank Shorter (USA)	29:47	Alicia Reese (USA)	37:40
2nd	1980	Craig Virgin (USA)	28:36	Patti Catalano (USA)	34:41
3rd	1981	Michael Musyoki (KEN)	27:55	Patti Catalano (USA)	32:09
4th	1982	Michael Musyoki (KEN)	27:49	Mary Slaney (USA)	32:51
5th	1983	Gidamis Shahanga (TAN)	28:21	Wendy Sly (ENG)	31:29
6th	1984	Marcus Nenow (USA)	27:23	Mary O'Connor (NZL)	32:29
7th	1985	Carlos Lopes (POR)	28:17	Wendy Sly (ENG)	32:14
8th	1986	Arturo Barrios (MEX)	28:16	Lisa Ondieki (AUS)	32:18
9th	1987	John Treacy (IRL)	27:59	Teresa Ornduff (USA)	31:55
10th	1988	Matthews Motshwarateu (BOT)	27:54	Lynn Nelson (USA)	32:14
11th	1989	Arturo Barrios (MEX)	27:50	Sylvia Mosqueda (USA)	32:32
12th	1990	Gidamis Shahanga (TAN)	28:37	Judi St. Hilaire (USA)	31:54
13th	1991	John Treacy (IRL)	29:08	Judi St. Hilaire (USA)	32:34
14th	1992	Dominic Kirui (KEN)	27:46	Judi St. Hilaire (USA)	32:21
15th	1993	Phillimon Hanneck (ZIM)	27:45	Judi St. Hilaire (USA)	31:56
16th	1994	William Sigei (KEN)	27:24	Judi St. Hilaire (USA)	32:26
17th	1995	Keith Brantly (USA)	29:12	Delilah Asiago (KEN)	33:02
18th	1996	Matt Giusto (USA)	27:58	Catherine Ndereba (KEN)	32:26
19th	1997	Todd Williams (USA)	28:50	Paula Radcliffe (ENG)	31:47
20th	1998	Simon Rono (KEN)	27:27	Jane Omoro (KEN)	31:28
21st	1999	Joshua Chelanga (KEN)	27:45	Jane Ngotho (KEN)	32:15
22nd	2000	James Kosgei (KEN)	27:37	Colleen De Reuck (RSA)	31:58
23rd	2001	James Kosgei (KEN)	28:31	Elana Meyer (RSA)	32:07
24th	2002	Sammy Kipketer (KEN)	27:10	Lornah Kiplagat (KEN)	31:45
25th	2003	John Korir (KEN)	28:14	Isabella Ochichi (KEN)	31:23
26th	2004	Nelson Kiplagat (KEN)	28:24	Isabella Ochichi (KEN)	31:36
27th	2005	Sammy Kipketer (KEN)	27:47	Isabella Ochichi (KEN)	30:27
28th	2006	Gilbert Okari (KEN)	27:49	Isabella Ochichi (KEN)	30:54
29th	2007	George Kirwa (KEN)	28:15	Teyba Erkesso (ETH)	32:08
30th	2008	Moses Kigen (KEN)	27:44	Genoveva Kigen (KEN)	32:11
31st	2009	Mark Kiptoo (KEN)	28:18	Lineth Chepkurui (KEN)	32:24
32nd	2010	Tilahun Regassa (ETH)	28:05	Lineth Chepkurui (KEN)	30:45
33rd	2011	Belete Assefa (ETH)	28:14	Wude Ayalew (ETH)	31:36
34th	2012	Solomon Deksisa (ETH)	28:14	Genoveva Kigen (KEN)	32:18
35th	2013	Isiah Koech (KEN)	27:32	Alice Kimutai (KEN)	31:51
36th	2014	Leonard Komon (KEN)	27:44	Risper Gesabwa (KEN)	31:43
37th	2015	John Muritu (KEN)	28:56	Hiwot Ayalew (ETH)	31:55
38th	2016	John Muritu (KEN)	28:02	Buze Diriba (ETH)	31:57
39th	2017	Jake Robertson (NZL)	27:55	Mamitu Daska (ETH)	32:19
40th	2018	Jake Robertson (NZL)	27:28	Monicah Ngige (KEN)	32:05
41st	2019	Jairus Birech (KEN)	27:53	Celliphine Chespol (KEN)	31:42
	2020	cancelled due to coronavirus pandemic			
	2021	cancelled due to coronavirus pandemic			
42nd	2022	Ben True (USA)	28:15	Bruktayit Eshetu (ETH)	31:34
43rd	2023	Kolyn Saltzman (USA)	31:23	Kir Selert Faraud (USA)	35:44
44th	2024	Matthew Hansen (AUS)	30:30	Ellen Feringa (USA)	34:34

=== Wins by country ===
Country	Men's race	Women's race	Total
Kenya	20	15	35
United States	8	14	22
Ethiopia	3	5	8
England	0	3	3
Ireland	2	0	2
Mexico	2	0	2
New Zealand	1	1	2
South Africa	0	2	2
Tanzania	2	0	2
Australia	0	1	1
Botswana	1	0	1
Portugal	1	0	1
Zimbabwe	1	0	1

== Festival ==
A concurrent festival begins as the first runners pass the finish line. The festival which includes a concert, food and beverages is held in City Park.

== See also ==
- Crescent City Fall Classic
