= Bassmaster Classic XXXI =

Fishing tournament in 2001

Bassmaster Classic XXXI was held August 2–4, 2001 in the Louisiana Delta surrounding New Orleans. Kevin VanDam of Kalamazoo, Michigan, won his first of four classics with a three-day total weight of 32 pounds, 5 ounces. He won $100,000 in prize money. The 2001 Classic was the first covered by ESPN. It broadcast daily updates of the competition as well as part of the final weigh-in from the Louisiana Superdome.

Top 5 finishers
1. Kevin VanDam, Kalamazoo, Michigan, 32-05
2. Scott Rook, Little Rock, Arkansas, 31-04
3. David Walker, Cannon, Kentucky, 31-03
4. Harold Allen, Shelbyville, Texas, 27-10
5. Gerald Swindle, Hayden, Alabama, 26-11

== See also ==
- Bassmaster Classic
