= Crescent City Fall Classic =

- Date: Second Saturday in November
- Location: New Orleans, Louisiana, United States
- Event type: Road
- Distance: 5km
- Website: www.ccc10k.com/crescent-city-corporate-classic

The Crescent City Fall Classic, now known as the Crescent City Corporate Classic, is an annual 5-kilometer race held in New Orleans, Louisiana, United States. The race is held in early November in City Park.

== See also ==
- Crescent City Classic
