= 2010 Portland Timbers season =

Portland Timbers
2010 season
- President: Merritt Paulson
- Head coach: Gavin Wilkinson
- Stadium: PGE Park; Portland, Oregon (Capacity: 15,418); Merlo Field (1 game); Portland, Oregon (Capacity: 4,892)
- D-2 Pro League: Conference: 3rd Overall: 4th (3rd in points); Playoffs: Quarterfinals
- U.S. Open Cup: Third round
- Cascadia Cup: 1st
- Top goalscorer: Ryan Pore (15 goals)
- Highest home attendance: League: 15,418 vs. Rochester (April 17) vs. Minnesota (August 11) vs. Baltimore (August 29) vs. Puerto Rico (September 2); All: 15,422 vs. Seattle (June 30)
- Lowest home attendance: League: 5,808 vs. Vancouver (April 29); All: 2,107 vs. Sonoma County (June 15)
- Average home league attendance: League: 10,727; All: 10,183
Primary colors	Secondary colors	Third colors

The 2010 Portland Timbers season was the tenth and final season for the club in the USL Conference of the USSF Division-2 Professional League (D-2 Pro League), the second tier of the United States soccer pyramid. The D-2 Pro League was a temporary professional soccer league created by the United States Soccer Federation (USSF) in 2010 to last just one season, as a compromise between the feuding United Soccer Leagues (USL) and the North American Soccer League (NASL). An expansion club retaining the Timbers name began play in Major League Soccer (MLS) in 2011.

The first competitive game of the 2010 season was played on April 17 at PGE Park in Portland, Oregon against the Rochester Rhinos. The Timbers won 1–0 on a Ryan Pore penalty in the 85th minute in front of a sold-out crowd of 15,418.

== Background ==
The Portland Timbers started shaping the squad for the 2010 season on December 7, 2009 when they announced the signing of Quavas Kirk from the Minnesota Thunder while also naming nine players from the 2009 squad who would not be returning.

On January 15, head coach Gavin Wilkinson was named the 2009 FieldTurf USL Division 1 Coach of the Year for the second time. Three days later, the Timbers appointed Wilkinson Technical director of the Portland Timbers MLS club which was scheduled to begin play in 2011.

Also in January, Portland held an open tryout followed by an invite-only combine for potential new players. Major League Soccer rules allow the organization to sign several players from the 2010 2nd division squad for the 2011 MLS squad, bypassing the league's complicated allocation process, so many ex-MLS players and prospects turned out for the tryouts.

Although not taking part in the tryouts, Haitian national team midfielder James Marcelin and Canadian defender Ross Smith were signed by the Timbers in early February. The club also revealed that defender Takuro Nishimura had been transferred to Crystal Palace Baltimore.

== Preseason ==
=== Trialists and training ===
2010-02-17	Portland Pilots (NCAA)	0–2	Portland Timbers trialists	Portland, Oregon
19:00 PST		Report	62', 64' DeMartin	Stadium: Merlo Field; Attendance: 1,142

2010-03-06	Oregon State Beavers (NCAA)	0–2	Portland Timbers	Corvallis, Oregon
18:00 PST		Report	DeMartin (pen.) López	Stadium: Paul Lorenz Field

The Timbers began their preseason schedule on February 17 against the Portland Pilots men's team at Merlo Field in a match to benefit Mercy Corps and their relief efforts in Haiti. The match featured mostly trialists for the Timbers including Doug DeMartin who scored both goals to lead the Timbers to a 2–0 victory over the off-season university squad. DeMartin, as well as former St. Pauli defender Ian Joy, rookie goalkeeper Matt Pyzdrowski and midfielder Derek Gaudet, were signed to contracts by the Timbers after featuring in the match.

Although just coming off of foot surgery, former U.S. national team goalkeeper Adin Brown was signed on February 23. After serving as a consultant with the Timbers for the past year, former Portland Trail Blazers executive Mike Golub was named chief operating officer of the Portland Timbers MLS club on March 1.

The returning players from the 2009 season saw their first action in a training match versus the Oregon State Beavers men's team in Corvallis on March 6. On March 11 it was announced that Alex Nimo would once again be acquired on loan from Real Salt Lake for the season.

=== Seattle Sounders FC Community Shield ===
2010-03-11	Seattle Sounders FC (MLS)	0–1	Portland Timbers	Seattle, Washington
18:00 PST		Report	44' Obatola	Stadium: Qwest Field; Attendance: 18,606

Five days after their first game action together, the team traveled to Seattle on March 11 for the inaugural Seattle Sounders FC Community Shield. Trialist O. J. Obatola scored the only goal as the Timbers defeated Seattle Sounders FC of MLS, who were also in their preseason, in front of 18,606 spectators at Qwest Field.

=== Final preparations ===
2010-03-20	San Jose Earthquakes (MLS)	1–1	Portland Timbers	Santa Clara, California
19:00 PDT	Glen 71'	Report	80' Thompson	Stadium: Buck Shaw Stadium; Attendance: 3,152

2010-03-26	Portland Timbers	2–0	Vancouver Whitecaps FC	Tukwila, Washington
10:30 PDT	DeMartin 12'; Dike 41'	Report		Stadium: Starfire Sports Complex

2010-03-27	Portland Timbers	1–0	Portland Pilots (NCAA)	Portland, Oregon
14:00 PDT	Obatola			Stadium: Lincoln High School

2010-04-03	Kitsap Pumas (PDL)	3–2	Portland Timbers	Bremerton, Washington
19:00 PDT	Perdido 48'; Christner 61', 70'	Report	40' Pore; (red card) 57' López; 63' Marcelin	Stadium: Bremerton Memorial Stadium

2010-04-10	Seattle Redhawks (NCAA)	0–2	Portland Timbers	Seattle, Washington
14:00 PDT			Obatola; Pore

On March 20, the Timbers went on the road to play the San Jose Earthquakes, their second MLS opponent in succession. The match ended in a 1–1 draw with long-time Timbers defender Scot Thompson scoring the 80th-minute equalizer. After winning two closed-door training matches on back-to-back days in different states versus Vancouver Whitecaps FC and the Portland Pilots men's team once again, Portland signed former FC Dallas defender Steve Purdy on April 2.

On April 3, Portland were on the road once more in Bremerton, Washington to face the Kitsap Pumas of the Premier Development League. Kitsap defeated Portland 3–2 in a competitive match which saw Rodrigo López sent off by receiving two yellow cards in rapid succession after coming on as a substitute.

The Timbers made their final preseason player additions on April 7 when forwards O. J. Obatola and Bright Dike were signed to contracts. The preseason culminated with another closed-door training match versus the Seattle Redhawks men's team in Seattle which the Timbers won thanks to goals from Obatola and returning first team midfielder Ryan Pore.

== Regular season ==
=== April ===
2010-04-17 D-2	Portland Timbers	1–0	Rochester Rhinos	Portland, Oregon
19:00 PDT	Pore 85' (pen.)	Report		Stadium: PGE Park; Attendance: 15,418 (SO)

2010-04-22 D-2	Portland Timbers	3–0	AC St. Louis	Portland, Oregon
19:00 PDT	Pore 1', 45+2'; Obatola 62'	Report		Stadium: PGE Park; Attendance: 5,893

2010-04-25 D-2	Montreal Impact	1–1	Portland Timbers	Montreal
11:00 PDT	Pizzolitto 81' (pen.)	Report	67' Pore	Stadium: Saputo Stadium; Attendance: 13,034 (SO)

2010-04-29 D-2 / CC	Portland Timbers	2–1	Vancouver Whitecaps FC	Portland, Oregon
19:00 PDT	Pore 7', 86'; Danso (red card) 85'	Report	11' Akwari	Stadium: PGE Park; Attendance: 5,808

The Portland Timbers began their 10th and final season in 2nd division soccer on April 17 by hosting the Rochester Rhinos at PGE Park. A sell-out crowd of 15,418 watched as a Ryan Pore penalty in the 85th minute was enough to earn Portland an opening day victory. The club continued their positive start to the season by downing expansion club AC St. Louis 3–0 in a match which saw Pore score two goals and new signing O. J. Obatola get his first competitive goal for the Timbers.

After earning a 1–1 draw with Montreal Impact in Portland's first road game of the year, the Timbers rounded out a successful April with a 2–1 victory over Cascadia Cup rivals Vancouver Whitecaps FC. Pore scored all three Timbers goals in the final two matches of April to give the midfielder six goals in four games as the Timbers stood atop the league.

=== May ===
2010-05-01 Friendly	Portland Timbers	1–3	Puntarenas	Portland, Oregon
19:00 PDT	Dike 22'	Report	33' Leal; 54' Díaz; 57' Peña	Stadium: PGE Park; Attendance: 7,478

2010-05-13 D-2	Portland Timbers	0–1	Crystal Palace Baltimore	Portland, Oregon
19:00 PDT		Report	29' Perez	Stadium: PGE Park; Attendance: 8,817

2010-05-15 D-2	Portland Timbers	1–1	AC St. Louis	Portland, Oregon
19:00 PDT	Keita 66'	Report	90+1' Ambersley	Stadium: PGE Park; Attendance: 10,057

2010-05-19 D-2	Portland Timbers	0–1	Montreal Impact	Portland, Oregon
19:00 PDT		Report	31' Donatelli	Stadium: PGE Park; Attendance: 6,573

2010-05-22 D-2	Crystal Palace Baltimore	2–1	Portland Timbers	Catonsville, Maryland
16:00 PDT	Marshall 74'; Patterson 90+1'	Report	60' (pen.) Pore	Stadium: UMBC Stadium; Attendance: 1,106

2010-05-29 Friendly	Portland Timbers	3–2	Boca Juniors	Portland, Oregon
19:00 PDT	Pore 16'; Keel 74'; López 90+1'	Report	50' Giménez; 52' Blandi	Stadium: PGE Park; Attendance: 14,106

Portland's four league matches in May were flanked by exhibition games featuring top Latin American competition. On May Day, Puntarenas of Costa Rica came to Portland and handed the Timbers a 3–1 loss. League play continued on May 13 with a loss at home to Crystal Palace Baltimore, a club in its first year in the 2nd division after moving up from the 3rd division following the 2009 season. That loss would be the start of an eight-game winless streak in the league for the Timbers.

Mandjou Keita, Portland's leading scorer from 2009 and recently returned from a loan spell in India, scored the opening goal against AC St. Louis in a rematch at PGE Park on May 15, but a stoppage time goal from Mike Ambersley meant the Timbers had to settle for a draw. Montreal Impact then traveled to Portland and took all 3 points from the suddenly struggling Timbers.

A disappointing May in the league was concluded when Crystal Palace Baltimore hosted the Timbers on May 22. Portland lost to Baltimore 2–1 after giving up another goal in second half injury time. The club's fortunes seemed to take a turn for the better when storied Argentinian club Boca Juniors came to town on May 29. In an exciting, back-and-forth game, the Timbers rallied to pull out a 3–2 victory thanks to a 91st minute free kick goal from Rodrigo López.

=== June ===
2010-06-06 D-2	Portland Timbers	1–1	Carolina RailHawks FC	Portland, Oregon
18:00 PDT	Pore 61'	Report	90+3' Paladini	Stadium: PGE Park; Attendance: 8,119

2010-06-09 D-2	Austin Aztex FC	0–0	Portland Timbers	Austin, Texas
17:30 PDT		Report		Stadium: House Park; Attendance: 3,241

2010-06-12 D-2	Miami FC	1–0	Portland Timbers	Fort Lauderdale, Florida
16:30 PDT	Veris 26'	Report		Stadium: Lockhart Stadium; Attendance: 1,004

2010-06-15 USOC 1st Rd	Portland Timbers	3–0	Sonoma County Sol (NPSL)	Portland, Oregon
19:00 PDT	Nimo 58'; Suzuki 88'; Marcelin 90+1'	Report		Stadium: PGE Park; Attendance: 2,107

2010-06-17 D-2	Portland Timbers	0–1	NSC Minnesota Stars	Portland, Oregon
19:00 PDT	Marcelin (red card) 52'	Report	20' Allen	Stadium: PGE Park; Attendance: 8,877

2010-06-19 D-2	NSC Minnesota Stars	0–2	Portland Timbers	Blaine, Minnesota
17:00 PDT		Report	6' (pen.) Pore; 89' Cameron	Stadium: National Sports Center; Attendance: 1,152

2010-06-22 USOC 2nd Rd	Kitsap Pumas (PDL)	1–4	Portland Timbers	Bremerton, Washington
19:00 PDT	Christner 90'	Report	34' Smith; 37', 47', 63' Dike	Stadium: Bremerton Memorial Stadium; Attendance: 1,205

2010-06-27 D-2	Portland Timbers	1–0	FC Tampa Bay	Portland, Oregon
17:00 PDT	Dike 73'	Report		Stadium: PGE Park; Attendance: 8,892

2010-06-30 USOC 3rd Rd	Portland Timbers	1–1 (a.e.t.) (3–4 p)	Seattle Sounders FC (MLS)	Portland, Oregon
19:30 PDT	Dike 38'	Report	13' Jaqua; (red card) 101' Graham	Stadium: PGE Park; Attendance: 15,422 (SO)
	Penalties
	Pore (penalty missed); DeMartin (penalty scored); Danso (penalty scored); Smith (penalty missed); López (penalty scored)		(penalty scored) Sturgis; (penalty scored) Zakuani; (penalty scored) Montero; (penalty missed) Ianni; (penalty scored) Scott

Hoping to build on their exhibition win versus Boca Juniors, the Timbers returned to league play as they hosted Carolina RailHawks FC on June 6. Ryan Pore again continued his scoring streak but Portland were thwarted by yet another stoppage time goal as Carolina earned a draw in the dying seconds of the match. The Timbers then traveled to Texas where they drew 0–0 with league leading Austin Aztex FC. Forward O. J. Obatola, who started six of the first seven league games and scored just one goal, had not played since the May 19 loss to Montreal and was released from his contract by mutual consent on June 10. Portland concluded their road trip on June 12 at Miami FC but lost 1–0 as their league winless streak was extended to seven games.

The second half of June would prove to be a congested affair as the 2010 edition of the U.S. Open Cup kicked off on June 15 with the Timbers hosting amateur side Sonoma County Sol of the National Premier Soccer League (NPSL) in the first round. The teams had met previously in the second round of the 2009 U.S. Open Cup and Portland were again victors by the same 3–0 scoreline.

Just two days later, the Timbers were back in league play as they welcomed expansion club NSC Minnesota Stars to Portland for the teams' first ever meeting. Former Los Angeles Galaxy and University of Washington midfielder Ely Allen opened the scoring for the visitors in the 20th minute and Timbers midfielder James Marcelin was sent off in the 52nd minute helping Minnesota to the surprise victory. Portland had an immediate opportunity for payback as they traveled to Minnesota to face the Stars again two days later. An early penalty goal from Pore and the first career goal for defender Josh Cameron in the 89th minute were enough for the Timbers to record a 2–0 victory. This halted a nearly two month stretch in the league without a win for the Timbers, a span covering eight games.

A busy June continued as Portland made the trip to face PDL side Kitsap Pumas in the second round of the U.S. Open Cup on June 22. Rookie forward Bright Dike recorded a hat-trick as the Timbers defeated the Pumas 4–1, ensuring Portland would meet long-time rival Seattle Sounders FC in the third round. Returning to league play on June 27, Portland continued its new-found momentum as the Timbers hosted expansion club FC Tampa Bay and came away 1–0 winners.

Cup play resumed for the Timbers on June 30 as Portland played host to Seattle Sounders FC of MLS in the third round of the competition once again. A sold-out crowd of 15,422 watched as the Timbers played the Sounders to a 1–1 draw. In extra time, Seattle defender Taylor Graham was sent off for bringing down Dike just outside the penalty area. Portland failed to capitalize on the man advantage, however, and the match would be decided by penalty kicks. Sounders FC and former U.S. national team goalkeeper Kasey Keller made two saves during the shootout to help Seattle win 4–3 on penalties and knock the Timbers out of the cup for the second year running.

=== July ===
2010-07-03 D-2 / CC	Portland Timbers	0–0	Vancouver Whitecaps FC	Portland, Oregon
19:00 PDT		Report		Stadium: PGE Park; Attendance: 9,017

2010-07-10 D-2	Portland Timbers	2–0	Miami FC	Portland, Oregon
19:00 PDT	Smith 48'; Pore 90+1'	Report		Stadium: PGE Park; Attendance: 12,189

2010-07-11 Friendly	Portland Timbers	1–1 (4–2 p)	Atlas	Portland, Oregon
18:00 PDT	Josten 77'; Suzuki (red card) 90+4'	Report	90+1' (pen.) Robles	Stadium: PGE Park; Attendance: 7,113
	Penalties
	Josten (penalty scored); Nimo (penalty scored); Keel (penalty scored); López (penalty scored)		(penalty scored) Gutiérrez; (penalty missed) Zamora; (penalty scored) Villalobos; (penalty missed) Flores

2010-07-17 Friendly	Portland Timbers	0–3	Manchester City	Portland, Oregon
19:00 PDT		Report	43' Ireland; 44' Adebayor; 68' Jô	Stadium: Merlo Field; Attendance: 5,018 (SO)

2010-07-22 D-2 / CC	Vancouver Whitecaps FC	1–2	Portland Timbers	Burnaby, British Columbia
19:30 PDT	Khalfan 51'; Janicki (red card) 65'	Report	66' (pen.) Pore; 72' Danso	Stadium: Swangard Stadium; Attendance: 5,387 (SO)

2010-07-28 D-2	AC St. Louis	3–0	Portland Timbers	Fenton, Missouri
17:10 PDT	Ambersley 25', 27', 57'	Report		Stadium: Anheuser-Busch Soccer Park; Attendance: 2,256

2010-07-31 D-2	FC Tampa Bay	2–2	Portland Timbers	Tampa, Florida
16:30 PDT	King 27'; Sánchez 57'	Report	16' Dike; 81' Suzuki	Stadium: George M. Steinbrenner Field; Attendance: 4,417

The Timbers had little time to rest after playing a draining 120 minutes against Seattle Sounders FC in the Open Cup as fellow Pacific Northwest rivals Vancouver Whitecaps FC returned to PGE Park for league play just three days later. Due to fatigue, head coach Gavin Wilkinson made eight changes to the side that faced Seattle and the reserves were able to earn a 0–0 draw to maintain their lead over Vancouver in the 2010 Cascadia Cup standings. After their first full week without a game for over a month, a refreshed Portland team played host to struggling Miami FC on July 10. Canadian defender Ross Smith scored his first league goal for the club and Ryan Pore got his tenth goal of the season to lead the Timbers to a 2–0 win. After the match, while celebrating on the way out of PGE Park, two long lost elementary school chums were reacquainted. Three-and-a-half years later they married and now are expecting a child.

A twelve-day break in league play allowed the Timbers to schedule back-to-back exhibition games versus foreign opponents. Just one day after defeating Miami, Mexican club Atlas visited Portland. A 77th minute George Josten goal seemed to be enough for the Timbers to grab a narrow victory until Quavas Kirk brought down an Atlas player in the penalty area, earning the Mexicans a penalty. Luis Robles converted the kick in the 91st minute meaning the match would be decided by a penalty shootout. Portland Timbers U23's goalkeeper Jake Gleeson made two saves during the shootout as the Timbers defeated Atlas 4–2 on penalties.

Due to PGE Park being unavailable because of a Portland Beavers baseball game, Portland faced English Premier League club Manchester City at Merlo Field on the campus of the University of Portland on July 17. A sold-out crowd of Timbers season ticket holders watched as Portland matched up well against the famous club during most of the first half. However, City closed out the half with two quick goals from Steven Ireland and Emmanuel Adebayor to take a 2–0 lead. Both teams made wholesale changes at the half and the Timbers again started well. An individual goal by Brazilian Jô in the 68th minute would finish off the scoring, however, as Portland lost to Manchester City 3–0.

The Timbers played the first game of a four-game road trip in Burnaby, British Columbia against Vancouver Whitecaps FC. Vancouver came into the game with a nine-game unbeaten streak and sitting atop the NASL Conference standings. The Whitecaps took the lead in the 51st minute as Nizar Khalfan beat Timbers goalkeeper Steve Cronin near post. Momentum swung Portland's direction as Pore was taken down inside the penalty area by Vancouver defender Greg Janicki. Janicki received a straight red card for the foul. Pore converted the ensuing penalty kick to level the game at 1–1. Portland took advantage of being a man up when Timbers defender Mamadou Danso found the back of the net after a 72nd minute scramble in the penalty area. Portland was able to hold on for the 2–1 victory—only their 2nd win in Vancouver since the Timbers reformed in 2001. With the win, Portland secured the Cascadia Cup for the second year in a row.

The second game of the road trip saw the Timbers in Fenton, Missouri to take on last place AC St. Louis. Earlier in the day, head coach Gavin Wilkinson was in Houston, Texas at the MLS All-Star Game in his role as Technical director of the MLS club to take part in a coin toss between the 2011 MLS expansion clubs, Portland and Vancouver. Vancouver won the toss and the right to choose first between several player acquisition mechanisms for each team's first season in Major League Soccer, including the MLS SuperDraft and MLS Expansion Draft. Portland took the field against AC St. Louis without their head coach. In a disappointing game for the Timbers, St. Louis midfielder Mike Ambersley scored a hat-trick to lead AC to a 3–0 win over Portland, bringing an end to a five-game unbeaten streak in the league for the Timbers.

Portland closed out the month of July by visiting FC Tampa Bay. Bright Dike opened the scoring for the Timbers in the 16th minute but Tampa Bay equalized eleven minutes later. In the second half, a free kick goal by Ricardo Sánchez in the 57th minute gave Tampa Bay the lead. They were unable to hold off the Timbers, though, as forward Takayuki Suzuki tallied his first league goal of 2010 in the 81st minute to give Portland a hard-fought 2–2 draw on the road.

=== August ===
2010-08-04 D-2	Rochester Rhinos	1–0	Portland Timbers	Rochester, New York
16:00 PDT	Versailles 22'	Report		Stadium: Marina Auto Stadium; Attendance: 6,978

2010-08-11 D-2	Portland Timbers	2–2	NSC Minnesota Stars	Portland, Oregon
19:00 PDT	Dike 44'; Pore 63' (pen.); Joy (red card) 64'	Report	24' Allen; 73' Bracalello	Stadium: PGE Park; Attendance: 15,418 (SO)

2010-08-14 D-2	AC St. Louis	0–1	Portland Timbers	Fenton, Missouri
17:10 PDT		Report	41' Dike	Stadium: Anheuser-Busch Soccer Park; Attendance: 2,312

2010-08-21 D-2	NSC Minnesota Stars	0–1	Portland Timbers	Blaine, Minnesota
17:00 PDT	Warren (red card) 66'	Report	68' (pen.) Pore	Stadium: National Sports Center; Attendance: 1,429

2010-08-26 D-2	Portland Timbers	1–1	Austin Aztex FC	Portland, Oregon
19:00 PDT	Dike 4'; López (red card) 90+4'	Report	26' Silva; (red card) 56' Bernard	Stadium: PGE Park; Attendance: 14,985

2010-08-29 D-2	Portland Timbers	3–0	Crystal Palace Baltimore	Portland, Oregon
18:00 PDT	Pore 15'; Dike 42', 53'	Report	(red card) 88' Veeder	Stadium: PGE Park; Attendance: 15,418 (SO)

Portland traveled to Rochester, New York for the fourth and final game of their road trip on August 4. Before the game, the Timbers announced the signing of Dutch forward Ibad Muhamadu for the remainder of the season. The team was to end the road trip on a sour note, however, as an early goal by Rochester was enough to defeat Portland 1–0.

On August 10, former Rangers and Chelsea forward John Spencer was named head coach of the Portland Timbers MLS club. Spencer had long been rumored to be the front-runner for the job after leaving his job as assistant coach for Houston Dynamo.

Spencer was in attendance as the Timbers were back at PGE Park to host NSC Minnesota Stars on August 11. A sold-out crowd watched as Minnesota took an early lead, but a third league goal from Bright Dike meant the score was tied 1–1 at halftime. In the second half, Ryan Pore was brought down inside the penalty area by a Stars defender and the Timbers were awarded a penalty. Pore scored with the penalty kick in the 63rd minute for his league-leading twelfth goal of the season. The celebrations were short-lived as one minute later Portland captain Ian Joy received a straight red card after a tackle on Stars midfielder Geison Moura. The Timbers, playing a man down, were unable to hold off Minnesota who equalized in the 73rd minute to draw with Portland 2–2.

After the game, it was revealed that Portland forward Mandjou Keita failed to show up for the game and had also missed two previous practices without notice. Keita last played a league game for the Timbers in the July 10 win over Miami, coming on as a substitute in the 81st minute. After missing a third practice, the Timbers placed Keita on personal leave to give the forward time to decide his future.

Hoping to avenge a July 28 3–0 loss in Missouri, the Timbers faced AC St. Louis for the fourth and final time of the season on August 14. Ibad Muhamadu made his first start for Portland but it was Bright Dike that got the only goal of the game in the 41st minute to give the Timbers a much-needed 1–0 victory on the road.

Head coach Gavin Wilkinson's scouting trip to Ghana earlier in the season proved fruitful as the Timbers announced the signing of Ghana U-20 national team member Kalif Alhassan from Ghanaian club Liberty Professionals on August 19. Alhassan had also been a member of the Ghana U-17 national team.

The Timbers enjoyed a rare week-long break between games as they prepared to face NSC Minnesota Stars for a fourth time with the series between the two teams even at 1–1–1. Reserve goalkeeper Matt Pyzdrowski made his first start of the year for Portland. A fairly even contest was decided when, in the 66th minute, Stars goalkeeper Joe Warren brought down Dike inside the box. A penalty kick was awarded to the Timbers and Warren was shown a straight red card for the foul. Pore stepped up and buried the penalty for his 13th goal of the season. With a man advantage, Portland's defense closed out the game and Pyzdrowski was credited with his first professional win and clean sheet as the Timbers won 1–0 in Minnesota.

On August 25, Portland announced the signing of defender Kevin Goldthwaite, who had recently been released by New York Red Bulls, for his second stint with the Timbers after a loan spell in 2005. The next day, the Timbers hosted second place Austin Aztex at PGE Park. A quick goal from Bright Dike gave Portland the lead in the 4th minute but the Aztex equalized 22 minutes later. Portland seemed to gain the upper hand in the second half when Austin's Kieron Bernard was sent off in the 56th minute. However, the Timbers failed to capitalize on the man advantage and had to settle for a 1–1 draw.

Revenge was on the mind of the Timbers players as they hosted Crystal Palace Baltimore, the only team in the league to defeat Portland twice, on August 29. In front of another sold-out crowd in a game thoroughly dominated by the Timbers, Ryan Pore scored his first non-penalty goal since July 10 and Bright Dike scored a brace on either side of halftime to give the emerging striker six goals in his last seven games. Baltimore played the last minutes of the game with 10 men as Portland recorded a comfortable 3–0 victory over their unlikely new rivals.

=== September ===
2010-09-02 D-2	Portland Timbers	1–0	Puerto Rico Islanders	Portland, Oregon
19:00 PDT	Pore 83'	Report		Stadium: PGE Park; Attendance: 15,418 (SO)

2010-09-11 D-2	Carolina RailHawks FC	0–0	Portland Timbers	Cary, North Carolina
16:00 PDT		Report		Stadium: WakeMed Soccer Park; Attendance: 2,104

2010-09-18 D-2	Puerto Rico Islanders	0–1	Portland Timbers	Bayamón, Puerto Rico
17:05 PDT		Report	90+1' Alhassan	Stadium: Juan Ramón Loubriel Stadium; Attendance: 3,602

2010-09-25 D-2	Crystal Palace Baltimore	1–3	Portland Timbers	Towson, Maryland
13:30 PDT	Fusilier (red card) 57'; Brooks 73' (pen.)	Report	3', 41' Dike; 86' Josten	Stadium: Paul Angelo Russo Stadium; Attendance: 1,538

The Timbers entered September on a five-game unbeaten streak, having not lost since August 4. Due to scheduled renovations of PGE Park for the 2011 Major League Soccer season, Portland would have to finish out the season on the road making the September 2 game versus Puerto Rico Islanders the last ever 2nd division soccer game for the Timbers in Portland. On the morning of the game, the Timbers announced they had reached a deal with Alaska Airlines to be the MLS shirt sponsor for the 2011 season.

The team would be without starting defender Mamadou Danso as he was called into camp with the Gambian national team for a 2012 Africa Cup of Nations qualifier versus Namibia. On a special night, in which the Timbers Army presented each player with sunflowers and a personalized banner, the Timbers left it to a late Ryan Pore goal in the 83rd minute to record a 1–0 victory over the Islanders in front of a sold-out stadium. After the game, the Timbers announced that attendance for the 2010 season set a new modern-franchise record which included a record five sell-outs of PGE Park.

With the win against Puerto Rico — and help from other results around the league — Portland secured a playoff berth for the second year in a row. In the first game of their season-ending road trip and without leading scorer Ryan Pore, the Timbers extended their unbeaten streak to seven games as they earned a 0–0 draw with the Carolina RailHawks.

One week later, Portland traveled to Puerto Rico to face the Islanders for the second time during the month. In his first start for the Timbers, new signing Kalif Alhassan chipped the ball over Islanders keeper Bill Gaudette in the third minute of second half stoppage time to record his first goal for the club and ensure the Timbers came away with a 1–0 victory.

On September 25, Portland were in Maryland for their fourth meeting of the season versus last place Crystal Palace Baltimore. Forward Bright Dike scored his eighth and ninth league goals of the season and forward George Josten added a third as the Timbers defeated Baltimore 3–1 to finish undefeated for the month of September.

=== October ===
2010-10-02 D-2 / CC	Vancouver Whitecaps FC	2–2	Portland Timbers	Burnaby, British Columbia
16:00 PDT	Dunfield 27'; Arnoux 68'	Report	46' Alhassan; 56' Dike	Stadium: Swangard Stadium; Attendance: 5,435 (SO)

== Postseason ==
2010-10-07 Playoffs QF1	Vancouver Whitecaps FC	2–0	Portland Timbers	Burnaby, British Columbia
19:30 PDT	Koffie 1'; Nash 13' (pen.)	Report		Stadium: Swangard Stadium; Attendance: 5,018

2010-10-10 Playoffs QF2	Portland Timbers	1–0	Vancouver Whitecaps FC	Portland, Oregon
18:00 PDT	Marcelin 49'	Report		Stadium: Merlo Field; Attendance: 4,884 (SO)

== Competitions ==
=== USSF Division-2 Professional League ===
The D-2 Pro League consisted of twelve teams from the United States, Canada and Puerto Rico. The league was divided into two conferences of six teams each. At the conclusion of the regular season, eight teams qualified for the playoffs—a seeded knockout tournament to determine the league champion. The 2010 regular season ran from April 10 to October 3. The Portland Timbers competed in the USL Conference along with five other teams. The NASL Conference contained the league's remaining six teams. The league schedule was weighted so that each team played more games against the three teams in their geographical region (called a pod), regardless of conference affiliation. Each team was also paired with one other team outside their pod for additional games.

The teams in the same pod as the Portland Timbers were NSC Minnesota Stars, AC St. Louis and Vancouver Whitecaps FC and faced the Timbers four times each (two home and two away) during the regular season. The Timbers were also paired with Crystal Palace Baltimore, who were outside of Portland's pod, for four games. The remaining seven teams were played two times each (one home and one away). This resulted in a thirty-game league schedule.

==== USL Conference table ====
USL Conference
Pos	Team	Pld	W	L	T	GF	GA	GD	Pts	Qualification
1	Rochester Rhinos	30	16	8	6	38	24	+14	54	Conference leader, qualified for playoffs
2	Austin Aztex	30	15	7	8	53	40	+13	53	Qualified for playoffs (Note: The remaining six teams with the highest point totals, regardless of conference, also advance to the playoffs.)
3	Portland Timbers	30	13	7	10	34	23	+11	49	Qualified for playoffs
4	NSC Minnesota Stars	30	11	12	7	32	36	−4	40	Qualified for playoffs
5	Puerto Rico Islanders	30	9	11	10	37	35	+2	37	Qualified for playoffs
6	FC Tampa Bay	30	7	12	11	41	46	−5	32	

Source: USSF D-2 schedule table

==== Results summary ====
Overall								Home						Away					
Pld	Pts	W	L	T	GF	GA	GD	W	L	T	GF	GA	GD	W	L	T	GF	GA	GD
30	49	13	7	10	34	23	+11	7	3	5	18	9	+9	6	4	5	16	14	+2

Last updated: October 2, 2010
Source: ussoccer.com
Pld = Matches played; Pts = Points; W = Matches won; T = Matches tied; L = Matches lost; GF = Goals for; GA = Goals against; GD = Goal difference

Round	1	2	3	4	5	6	7	8	9	10	11	12	13	14	15	16	17	18	19	20	21	22	23	24	25	26	27	28	29	30
Stadium	H	H	A	H	H	H	H	A	H	A	A	H	A	H	H	H	A	A	A	A	H	A	A	H	H	H	A	A	A	A
Result	W	W	T	W	L	T	L	L	T	T	L	L	W	W	T	W	W	L	T	L	T	W	W	T	W	W	T	W	W	T
Conference	4	2	1	1	1	2	3	3	4	5	5	5	5	3	3	3	3	3	3	3	4	3	3	3	3	3	3	3	3	3
League	6	3	1	1	1	3	5	6	7	8	9	9	8	5	5	5	4	5	5	5	6	5	5	4	4	4	4	4	4	4

Updated to match(es) played on October 2, 2010. Source: D-2 Pro League Results & League table
A = Away; H = Home; W = Win; L = Loss; T = Tie

=== D-2 Pro League Playoffs ===
The 2010 D-2 Pro League playoffs were a seeded knockout tournament to determine the 2010 D-2 Pro League champion. Eight teams from the twelve team league qualified for the playoffs. The top team in each conference automatically qualified while the next 6 teams with the highest point totals, regardless of conference, also qualified.

==== Playoff bracket ====
Each round is a two-game aggregate goal series. Home teams for the first game of each series listed at the bottom of the bracket.

Quarterfinals
1	Rochester Rhinos	0	2	2
8	Puerto Rico Islanders	2	1	3
4	Portland Timbers	0	1	1
5	Vancouver Whitecaps	2	0	2
3	Austin Aztex	0	2	2
6	Montreal Impact	2	3	5
2	Carolina RailHawks	0	4	4
7	NSC Minnesota Stars	0	0	0

Semifinals
5	Vancouver Whitecaps	0	0	0
8	Puerto Rico Islanders (aet)	0	2	2
2	Carolina RailHawks	0	2	2
6	Montreal Impact	1	0	1

Final
2	Carolina RailHawks	0	1	1
8	Puerto Rico Islanders	2	1	3

==== Quarterfinals ====
2010-10-07
19:30 PDT
Leg 1

Vancouver Whitecaps FC	2–0	Portland Timbers
Koffie 1'; Nash 13' (pen.)	Report

Swangard Stadium, Burnaby, British Columbia
Attendance: 5,018

2010-10-10
18:00 PDT
Leg 2

Portland Timbers	1–0	Vancouver Whitecaps FC
Marcelin 49'	Report

Merlo Field, Portland, Oregon
Attendance: 4,884 (SO)

=== U.S. Open Cup ===
==== Cup bracket ====
Second Round winners advance to play one of 8 MLS clubs in 16-team knockout tournament
Home teams listed on top of bracket

First Round
PDL	Kitsap Pumas	4
NPSL	Bay Area Ambassadors	2
D-2	Portland Timbers	3
NPSL	Sonoma County Sol	0

Second Round
PDL	Kitsap Pumas	1
D-2	Portland Timbers	4

Third Round
D-2	Portland Timbers	1 (3)
MLS	Seattle Sounders FC (aet) (p)	1 (4)

==== First round ====
2010-06-15
19:00 PDT

Portland Timbers	3–0	Sonoma County Sol (NPSL)
Nimo 58'; Suzuki 88'; Marcelin 90+1'	Report

PGE Park
Attendance: 2,107

==== Second round ====
2010-06-22
19:00 PDT

Kitsap Pumas (PDL)	1–4	Portland Timbers
Christner 90'	Report	34' Smith; 37', 47', 63' Dike

Bremerton Memorial Stadium
Attendance: 1,205

==== Third round ====
2010-06-30
19:30 PDT

Portland Timbers	1–1 (a.e.t.)	Seattle Sounders FC (MLS)
Dike 38'	Report	13' Jaqua; (red card) 101' Graham
Penalties
Pore (penalty missed); DeMartin (penalty scored); Danso (penalty scored); Smith (penalty missed); López (penalty scored)	3–4	(penalty scored) Sturgis; (penalty scored) Zakuani; (penalty scored) Montero; (penalty missed) Ianni; (penalty scored) Scott

PGE Park
Attendance: 15,422 (SO)

=== Cascadia Cup ===
The Cascadia Cup is a trophy that was created in 2004 by supporters of the Portland Timbers, Seattle Sounders and Vancouver Whitecaps FC. It is awarded to the club with the best record in league games versus the other participants. Since 2009, when Seattle joined Major League Soccer, the cup has been contested between Portland and Vancouver only. In 2011, when the Timbers and the Whitecaps joined the Sounders in MLS, all three Cascadia rivals again vied for the cup.

The Timbers secured the 2010 Cascadia Cup—the club's second—on July 22 after defeating Vancouver 2–1 in a league match at Swangard Stadium in Burnaby, British Columbia.

==== 2010 table ====
Team	Pld	W	L	T	GF	GA	GD	Pts
Portland Timbers	4	2	0	2	6	4	+2	8
Vancouver Whitecaps	4	0	2	2	4	6	−2	2

==== Match results ====
2010-04-29
19:00 PDT
Match 1

Portland Timbers	2–1	Vancouver Whitecaps FC
Pore 7', 86'; Danso (red card) 85'	Report	11' Akwari

PGE Park
Attendance: 5,808

2010-07-03
19:00 PDT
Match 2

Portland Timbers	0–0	Vancouver Whitecaps FC
	Report

PGE Park
Attendance: 9,017

2010-07-22
19:30 PDT
Match 3

Vancouver Whitecaps FC	1–2	Portland Timbers
Khalfan 51'; Janicki (red card) 65'	Report	66' (pen.) Pore; 72' Danso

Swangard Stadium
Attendance: 5,387 (SO)

2010-10-02
16:00 PDT
Match 4

Vancouver Whitecaps FC	2–2	Portland Timbers
Dunfield 27'; Arnoux 68'	Report	46' Alhassan; 56' Dike

Swangard Stadium
Attendance: 5,435 (SO)

== Club ==
=== Coaching staff ===
Position	Staff
Head coach	(New Zealand) Gavin Wilkinson
Assistant coach	(United States) Amos Magee
Assistant coach	(United States) Jim Rilatt
Goalkeeper coach	(United States) Adam Smith

Updated to match played May 24, 2011

=== Management ===
Majority Owner & President	(United States) Merritt Paulson
General Manager	(New Zealand) Gavin Wilkinson
Ground (capacity and dimensions)	PGE Park (15,418 / )

Updated to match played May 24, 2011

== Squad ==
=== Kits ===
Primary	Secondary	Third

=== Final roster ===
Note: Flags indicate national team as defined under FIFA eligibility rules; some limited exceptions apply. Players may hold more than one non-FIFA nationality.

No.	Pos.	Nation	Player
0	GK	USA	Steve Cronin
1	GK	USA	Matt Pyzdrowski
2	MF	CAN	Derek Gaudet
4	DF	USA	Josh Cameron
5	DF	USA	Quavas Kirk
6	DF	NZL	Cameron Knowles (inactive)
7	MF	USA	Brian Farber
8	MF	USA	Rodrigo López
11	MF	SWE	Johan Claesson
12	MF	USA	Tony McManus
13	DF	USA	Stephen Keel
14	MF	HAI	James Marcelin
15	DF	SCO	Ian Joy (captain)
16	MF	USA	Alex Nimo (on loan from Real Salt Lake)

No.	Pos.	Nation	Player
17	DF	USA	Scot Thompson
18	FW	USA	Doug DeMartin
19	FW	USA	George Josten
20	DF	CAN	Ross Smith
21	MF	GHA	Kalif Alhassan
22	MF	USA	Keith Savage
23	MF	USA	Ryan Pore
24	GK	USA	Adin Brown
25	DF	ESA	Steve Purdy
27	FW	NGR	Bright Dike
29	FW	NED	Ibad Muhamadu
30	FW	JPN	Takayuki Suzuki
33	DF	USA	Kevin Goldthwaite
98	DF	GAM	Mamadou Danso

=== Recognition ===
D-2 Pro League Most Valuable Player

Player	Link
(United States) Ryan Pore	D-2 Pro League Postseason Awards Day 2

D-2 Pro League Goal Scoring Champion

Player	Link
(United States) Ryan Pore	D-2 Pro League Postseason Awards Day 1

D-2 Pro League Best XI

Player	Link
(United States) Ryan Pore	D-2 Pro League Postseason Awards Day 2

D-2 Pro League Player of the Month

Month	Player	Link
April	(United States) Ryan Pore	D-2 Pro League April PotM

=== Statistics ===
==== Appearances and goals ====
Last updated on October 11, 2010.

No.	Pos	Nat	Player	Total		D-2 Pro League		Playoffs		U.S. Open Cup	
No.	Pos	Nat	Player	Apps	Goals	Apps	Goals	Apps	Goals	Apps	Goals
0	GK	(United States) USA	Steve Cronin	33	0	28+0	0	2+0	0	3+0	0
1	GK	(United States) USA	Matt Pyzdrowski	3	0	2+1	0	0+0	0	0+0	0
2	MF	(Canada) CAN	Derek Gaudet	9	0	7+1	0	0+0	0	1+0	0
4	DF	(United States) USA	Josh Cameron	11	1	7+3	1	0+0	0	1+0	0
5	DF	(United States) USA	Quavas Kirk	18	0	12+6	0	0+0	0	0+0	0
6	DF	(New Zealand) NZL	Cameron Knowles	0	0	0+0	0	0+0	0	0+0	0
7	MF	(United States) USA	Brian Farber	8	0	5+2	0	0+0	0	1+0	0
8	MF	(United States) USA	Rodrigo López	23	0	4+15	0	0+2	0	0+2	0
(9)	FW	(Nigeria) NGR	O. J. Obatola (released)	6	1	6+0	1	0+0	0	0+0	0
(10)	FW	(Guinea) GUI	Mandjou Keita (transferred to (India) Pune FC)	13	1	9+1	1	0+0	0	1+2	0
11	MF	(Sweden) SWE	Johan Claesson	18	0	11+6	0	1+0	0	0+0	0
12	MF	(United States) USA	Tony McManus	31	0	14+12	0	1+1	0	2+1	0
13	DF	(United States) USA	Stephen Keel	26	0	18+5	0	2+0	0	0+1	0
14	MF	(Haiti) HAI	James Marcelin	29	2	22+3	0	2+0	1	2+0	1
15	DF	(United States) USA	Ian Joy	25	0	21+0	0	2+0	0	2+0	0
16	MF	(United States) USA	Alex Nimo	25	1	17+5	0	0+0	0	3+0	1
17	DF	(United States) USA	Scot Thompson	15	0	7+5	0	0+0	0	3+0	0
18	FW	(United States) USA	Doug DeMartin	24	0	8+11	0	2+0	0	1+2	0
19	FW	(United States) USA	George Josten	18	1	7+11	1	0+0	0	0+0	0
20	DF	(Canada) CAN	Ross Smith	20	2	16+0	1	1+0	0	3+0	1
21	MF	(Ghana) GHA	Kalif Alhassan	8	2	3+3	2	2+0	0	0+0	0
22	MF	(United States) USA	Keith Savage	10	0	8+2	0	0+0	0	0+0	0
23	MF	(United States) USA	Ryan Pore	34	15	28+1	15	2+0	0	3+0	0
24	GK	(United States) USA	Adin Brown	1	0	0+1	0	0+0	0	0+0	0
25	DF	(United States) USA	Steve Purdy	27	0	19+5	0	2+0	0	0+1	0
27	FW	(United States) USA	Bright Dike	27	14	19+4	10	2+0	0	2+0	4
29	FW	(Netherlands) NED	Ibad Muhamadu	12	0	6+4	0	0+2	0	0+0	0
30	FW	(Japan) JPN	Takayuki Suzuki	28	2	5+19	1	0+2	0	2+0	1
33	DF	(United States) USA	Kevin Goldthwaite	3	0	1+0	0	1+1	0	0+0	0
98	DF	(The Gambia) GAM	Mamadou Danso	27	1	20+4	1	0+0	0	3+0	0

==== Top scorers ====
Players with 1 goal or more included only.

Last updated on October 11, 2010

Rk.	Nat.	Position	Player	Total	D-2 Pro League	Playoffs	U.S. Open Cup
1	(United States)	MF	Ryan Pore	15	15	0	0
2	(United States)	FW	Bright Dike	14	10	0	4
3	(Ghana)	MF	Kalif Alhassan	2	2	0	0
3	(Canada)	DF	Ross Smith	2	1	0	1
3	(Japan)	FW	Takayuki Suzuki	2	1	0	1
3	(Haiti)	MF	James Marcelin	2	0	1	1
7	(United States)	DF	Josh Cameron	1	1	0	0
7	(The Gambia)	DF	Mamadou Danso	1	1	0	0
7	(United States)	FW	George Josten	1	1	0	0
7	(Guinea)	FW	Mandjou Keita	1	1	0	0
7	(Nigeria)	FW	O. J. Obatola	1	1	0	0
7	(United States)	MF	Alex Nimo	1	0	0	1
			TOTALS	43	34	1	8

==== Disciplinary record ====
Players with 1 card or more included only.

Last updated on October 11, 2010

No.	Nat.	Position	Player	Total		D-2 Pro League		Playoffs		U.S. Open Cup	
No.	Nat.	Position	Player	Booked	Sent off (straight red)	Booked	Sent off (straight red)	Booked	Sent off (straight red)	Booked	Sent off (straight red)
0	(United States)	GK	Steve Cronin	2	0	2	0	0	0	0	0
4	(United States)	DF	Josh Cameron	2	0	2	0	0	0	0	0
5	(United States)	DF	Quavas Kirk	2	0	2	0	0	0	0	0
8	(United States)	MF	Rodrigo López	3	1	3	1	0	0	0	0
(9)	(Nigeria)	FW	O. J. Obatola	1	0	1	0	0	0	0	0
12	(United States)	MF	Tony McManus	1	0	1	0	0	0	0	0
13	(United States)	DF	Stephen Keel	2	0	1	0	0	0	1	0
14	(Haiti)	MF	James Marcelin	5	1	5	1	0	0	0	0
15	(United States)	DF	Ian Joy	9	1	8	1	1	0	0	0
16	(United States)	MF	Alex Nimo	4	0	4	0	0	0	0	0
17	(United States)	DF	Scot Thompson	2	0	1	0	0	0	1	0
19	(United States)	FW	George Josten	1	0	1	0	0	0	0	0
20	(Canada)	DF	Ross Smith	1	0	1	0	0	0	0	0
23	(United States)	MF	Ryan Pore	3	0	2	0	1	0	0	0
25	(United States)	DF	Steve Purdy	3	0	3	0	0	0	0	0
27	(United States)	FW	Bright Dike	6	0	6	0	0	0	0	0
29	(Netherlands)	FW	Ibad Muhamadu	4	0	4	0	0	0	0	0
30	(Japan)	FW	Takayuki Suzuki	4	0	3	0	0	0	1	0
98	(The Gambia)	DF	Mamadou Danso	4	1	4	1	0	0	0	0
			TOTALS	59	4	54	4	2	0	3	0

==== Goalkeeper stats ====
Last updated on October 11, 2010.

No.	Nat.	Player	Total				D-2 Pro League				Playoffs				U.S. Open Cup			
No.	Nat.	Player	MIN	GA	GAA	SV	MIN	GA	GAA	SV	MIN	GA	GAA	SV	MIN	GA	GAA	SV
0	(United States)	Steve Cronin	2989	26	0.78	92	2509	22	0.79	81	180	2	1.00	4	300	2	0.60	7
1	(United States)	Matt Pyzdrowski	183	1	0.49	5	183	1	0.49	5	0	0	–	0	0	0	–	0
24	(United States)	Adin Brown	8	0	0.00	0	8	0	0.00	0	0	0	–	0	0	0	–	0
		TOTALS	3180	27	0.76	97	2700	23	0.77	86	180	2	1.00	4	300	2	0.60	7

=== Player movement ===
==== Transfers in ====
Permanent

Date	Pos.	Name	Previous club	Fee
December 7, 2009	DF	(United States) Quavas Kirk	(United States) Minnesota Thunder	Free
February 11, 2010	MF	(Haiti) James Marcelin	Puerto Rico Islanders	Free
February 15, 2010	DF	(Canada) Ross Smith	(England) Ebbsfleet United	Free
February 18, 2010	DF	(United States) Ian Joy	(Germany) Ingolstadt 04	Free
February 23, 2010	GK	(United States) Adin Brown	(Norway) Aalesund	Free
February 26, 2010	FW	(United States) Doug DeMartin (R)	(United States) Michigan State Spartans (United States) Michigan Bucks	Free
February 26, 2010	MF	(Canada) Derek Gaudet	(Canada) Halifax Dunbrack	Free
February 26, 2010	GK	(United States) Matt Pyzdrowski (R)	(United States) Marquette Golden Eagles (United States) Chicago Fire Premier	Free
April 2, 2010	DF	(United States) Steve Purdy	(United States) FC Dallas	Free
April 7, 2010	FW	(Nigeria) O. J. Obatola	(Singapore) Gombak United	Undisclosed
April 7, 2010	FW	(United States) Bright Dike (R)	(United States) Notre Dame Fighting Irish (United States) Indiana Invaders	Free
August 4, 2010	FW	(Netherlands) Ibad Muhamadu	(Netherlands) Dordrecht	Free
August 19, 2010	MF	(Ghana) Kalif Alhassan	(Ghana) Liberty Professionals	Undisclosed
August 25, 2010	DF	(United States) Kevin Goldthwaite	(United States) New York Red Bulls	Free

Loan

Date	Pos.	Name	From	Return Date
March 11, 2010	MF	(United States) Alex Nimo	(United States) Real Salt Lake	End of Season

==== Transfers out ====
Permanent

Date	Pos.	Name	To	Fee
December 7, 2009	FW	(United States) Jason McLaughlin	N/A	Contract expired
December 7, 2009	FW	(United States) Kevin Forrest	N/A	Contract expired
December 7, 2009	FW	(Sweden) Antouman Jallow	N/A	Contract expired
December 7, 2009	DF	(United States) David Hayes	N/A	Contract expired
December 7, 2009	DF	(United States) Cameron Dunn	N/A	Contract expired
December 7, 2009	DF	(Mexico) Ivan Becerra	N/A	Contract expired
December 7, 2009	MF	(United States) Shaun Higgins	N/A	Contract expired
December 7, 2009	MF	(United States) Tom Poltl	N/A	Contract expired
December 7, 2009	GK	(United States) Brian Visser	N/A	Contract expired
February 11, 2010	DF	(Japan) Takuro Nishimura	(United States) Crystal Palace Baltimore	Undisclosed
June 10, 2010	FW	(Nigeria) O. J. Obatola	Unattached	Released
September 1, 2010	FW	(Guinea) Mandjou Keita	(India) Pune FC	Undisclosed

Loan

Date	Pos.	Name	To	Return Date
November 11, 2009	FW	(Guinea) Mandjou Keita	(India) Salgaocar	April 28, 2010
