= 2010 FC Tampa Bay season =

FC Tampa Bay
2010 season
- Owners: Hinds Howard; David Laxer; Andrew Nestor
- Head coach: Paul Dalglish (resigned Sept. 23); Perry Van der Beck (interim)
- Stadium: George M. Steinbrenner Field; Tampa, Florida
- USSF D2 Pro League: 6th in USL Conference
- U.S. Open Cup: Second Round
- Ponce De Leon Cup: Winners
- Coastal Cup: Winners
- Top goalscorer: League: Aaron King (12); All: Aaron King (13)
- Highest home attendance: 8,082 (May 8 v. Austin)
- Lowest home attendance: 1,698 (September 16 v. Austin)
- Average home league attendance: 3,866
Home colors	Away colors

The 2010 FC Tampa Bay season was the first and inaugural season of FC Tampa Bay and only season in the USL Conference of the USSF Division 2 Professional League, the second tier of the American Soccer Pyramid. The USSF D-2 was a temporary professional soccer league created by the United States Soccer Federation (USSF) in 2010 to last just one season, as a compromise between the feuding United Soccer Leagues (USL) and the North American Soccer League (NASL).

== Review ==
The team won its first official game on April 16, 2010, 1–0, over Crystal Palace Baltimore on a goal by striker Aaron King. The first home game, a 2–2 draw with Austin Aztex FC, was played at George M. Steinbrenner Field in Tampa on May 8, 2010.

The club got off to a fast start with a 5–1–3 record, but then slumped the rest of the way. They won only two of their final 21 games and failed to make the playoffs with a final record of 7–12–11. This led to dismissal of manager Paul Dalglish, with Perry Van der Beck finishing the season as interim manager. Positives from the season included capturing the inaugural Coastal Cup versus Miami FC. They also took home the 2010 Ponce De Leon Cup, which was contested between Miami FC, the Puerto Rico Islanders and FC Tampa Bay.

== Club ==
=== Roster ===
as of August 10, 2010

Note: Flags indicate national team as defined under FIFA eligibility rules; some limited exceptions apply. Players may hold more than one non-FIFA nationality.

No.	Pos.	Nation	Player
1	GK	USA	Daryl Sattler
2	DF	USA	Rob Valentino
3	DF	SCO	Graham Tatters
4	DF	USA	Julian Valentin (captain)
5	MF	USA	Gordon Kljestan
6	MF	USA	Erik Ustruck
7	FW	USA	Kwame Adjeman-Pamboe
8	MF	NZL	Jeremy Christie
9	MF	USA	Drew Yates
10	FW	CUB	Maykel Galindo (on loan from Chivas USA)
11	MF	USA	Chad Burt
13	DF	CUB	Yendry Diaz
14	MF	HAI	Pascal Milien

No.	Pos.	Nation	Player
15	DF	USA	Joe Donoho
16	GK	USA	Phillip Lamarre
17	MF	CAN	Mozzi Gyorio
18	FW	USA	Aaron King
19	GK	USA	Josh Lambo (on loan from Dallas)
21	FW	USA	Aaron Wheeler
22	DF	USA	Scott Buete
23	FW	CHN	Long Tan
24	MF	NIR	Jonny Steele
25	MF	MEX	Ricardo Sánchez
27	MF	ZIM	Stanley Nyazamba
32	MF	JPN	Takuya Yamada

=== Staff ===
- (United States) Perry Van der Beck - Head Coach

== Preseason ==
March 6, 2010	Tampa Spartans	2–2	FC Tampa Bay	Tampa, FL
7:00 PM EDT	Warren 2'; Goncalves 34'	Report; Report 2	Nowland 31'; 87' (o.g.)	Stadium: Pepin Stadium

March 12, 2010	FC Tampa Bay	2–2	FC Dallas	Tampa, FL
7:30 PM EDT	Burt 38'; Adjeman-Pamboe 52'	Report	Luna 46', 50'	Stadium: Pepin Stadium

March 19, 2010	FC Tampa Bay	1–0	Philadelphia Union	Tampa, FL
7:30 PM EDT	Wheeler 4'	Report		Stadium: Pepin Stadium

March 26, 2010	FC Tampa Bay	3–0	UCF Knights	Auburndale, FL
7:00 PM EDT	Yamada 27'; King 49'; Diaz (2nd half)	Report 1 Report 2		Stadium: Lake Myrtle Sports Complex; Attendance: 2,000+

April 10, 2010	USF Bulls	1–1	FC Tampa Bay	Tampa, FL
7:30 PM EDT	Yamada 44' (o.g.)	Report 1 Report 2	Adjeman-Pamboe 85'	Stadium: USF Soccer Stadium; Attendance: 2,600

== USSF D-2 ==
=== USL Conference standings ===
USL Conference
Pos	Team	Pld	W	L	T	GF	GA	GD	Pts	Qualification
1	Rochester Rhinos	30	16	8	6	38	24	+14	54	Conference leader, qualified for playoffs
2	Austin Aztex	30	15	7	8	53	40	+13	53	Qualified for playoffs (Note: The remaining six teams with the highest point totals, regardless of conference, also advance to the playoffs.)
3	Portland Timbers	30	13	7	10	34	23	+11	49	Qualified for playoffs
4	NSC Minnesota Stars	30	11	12	7	32	36	−4	40	Qualified for playoffs
5	Puerto Rico Islanders	30	9	11	10	37	35	+2	37	Qualified for playoffs
6	FC Tampa Bay	30	7	12	11	41	46	−5	32	

Source: USSF D-2 schedule table

=== Results summary ===
Overall								Home						Away					
Pld	W	D	L	GF	GA	GD	Pts	W	D	L	GF	GA	GD	W	D	L	GF	GA	GD
30	7	11	12	41	46	−5	32	4	7	4	25	22	+3	3	4	8	16	24	−8

Last updated: April 26, 2018.
Source: Match reports

=== Matches ===
April 16, 2010 Round 1	Crystal Palace Baltimore	0–1	FC Tampa Bay	Baltimore, MD
7:00 PM EDT		Report	King 66'	Stadium: UMBC Stadium; Attendance: 1,029

April 24, 2010 Round 2	NSC Minnesota Stars	1–0	FC Tampa Bay	Blaine, MN
8:00 PM EDT	Gao 34' (pen.)	Report		Stadium: National Sports Center; Attendance: 2,310

May 1, 2010 Round 3	Miami FC	1–1	FC Tampa Bay	Fort Lauderdale, FL
7:30 PM EDT	Gomez 40'	Report	Valentin 82'	Stadium: Lockhart Stadium; Attendance: 1,502

May 8, 2010 Round 4	FC Tampa Bay	2–2	Austin Aztex FC	Tampa, FL
7:30 PM EDT	King 10' (pen.); Christie 86' (pen.)	Report	Johnson 28'; Watson 60' (pen.)	Stadium: George M. Steinbrenner Field; Attendance: 8,082

May 14, 2010 Round 5	Carolina Railhawks	1–2	FC Tampa Bay	Cary, NC
7:00 PM EDT	Richardson 42'	Report	Donoho 61'; Wheeler 84'	Stadium: WakeMed Soccer Park; Attendance: 2,641

May 19, 2010 Round 6	Austin Aztex FC	3–3	FC Tampa Bay	Austin, TX
8:30 PM EDT	Marshall 28'; Johnson 45' 53'	Report	Wheeler 35'; Donoho 45'; Kljestan 88'	Stadium: House Park; Attendance: 6,051

May 22, 2010 Round 7	AC St. Louis	0–3	FC Tampa Bay	Fenton, MO
7:10 PM EDT		Report	Milien 37'; Adjeman-Pamboe 64'; Tan 90' (pen.)	Stadium: Anheuser-Busch Center; Attendance: 3,402

May 27, 2010 Round 8	FC Tampa Bay	3–1	NSC Minnesota Stars	Tampa, FL
7:30 PM EDT	Kljestan 6'; Wheeler 20' (pen.); Tan 26'	Report	Hlavaty 38'	Stadium: George M. Steinbrenner Field; Attendance: 3,886

May 29, 2010 Round 9	FC Tampa Bay	2–1	Puerto Rico Islanders	Tampa, FL
7:30 PM EDT	Wheeler 43'; King 83'	Report	Vélez 56'	Stadium: George M. Steinbrenner Field; Attendance: 5,023

June 6, 2010 Round 10	Vancouver Whitecaps FC	1–0	FC Tampa Bay	Burnaby, Canada
7:00 PM EDT	Nash 45' (pen.)	Report		Stadium: Swangard Stadium; Attendance: 5,288

June 12, 2010 Round 11	FC Tampa Bay	1–2	Montreal Impact	Tampa, FL
7:00 PM EDT	King 70'	Report	Byers 49'; Brown 66'	Stadium: George M. Steinbrenner Field; Attendance: 4,787

June 19, 2010 Round 12	Puerto Rico Islanders	1–0	FC Tampa Bay	Bayamón, Puerto Rico
8:05 PM EDT	Foley 65'	Report		Stadium: Juan Ramón Loubriel Stadium; Attendance: 1,542

June 27, 2010 Round 13	Portland Timbers	1–0	FC Tampa Bay	Portland, OR
8:00 PM EDT	Dike 73'	Report		Stadium: PGE Park; Attendance: 8,892

July 4, 2010 Round 14	FC Tampa Bay	1–1	Miami FC	Tampa, FL
7:00 PM EDT	Christie 82'	Report	Santeliz 90'	Stadium: George M. Steinbrenner Field; Attendance: 5,123

July 10, 2010 Round 15	NSC Minnesota Stars	1–0	FC Tampa Bay	Blaine, MN
8:00 PM EDT	Valentino 29' (o.g.)	Report		Stadium: National Sports Center; Attendance: 1,653

July 15, 2010 Round 16	FC Tampa Bay	0–0	Puerto Rico Islanders	Tampa, FL
7:30 PM EDT		Report		Stadium: George M. Steinbrenner Field; Attendance: 2,742

July 22, 2010 Round 17	FC Tampa Bay	0–1	Rochester Rhinos	Tampa, FL
7:30 PM EDT		Report	Kissi 90+1'	Stadium: George M. Steinbrenner Field; Attendance: 3,882

July 25, 2010 Round 18	FC Tampa Bay	2–0	Miami FC	Tampa, FL
4:00 PM EDT	Valentin 36'; King 66'	Report		Stadium: George M. Steinbrenner Field; Attendance: 3,226

July 31, 2010 Round 19	FC Tampa Bay	2–2	Portland Timbers	Tampa, FL
7:00 PM EDT	King 27'; Sánchez 57'	Report	Dike 16'; Suzuki 81'	Stadium: George M. Steinbrenner Field; Attendance: 4,417

August 7, 2010 Round 20	Austin Aztex FC	4–2	FC Tampa Bay	Austin, TX
8:30 PM EDT	Needham 16' 35'; L. Watson 18'; M. Griffin 45'	Report	Sánchez 21' (pen.); Tan 25'	Stadium: House Park; Attendance: 3,671

August 11, 2010 Round 21	Puerto Rico Islanders	1–1	FC Tampa Bay	Bayamón, Puerto Rico
8:05 PM EDT	Hansen 31'	Report	Sánchez 90+2'	Stadium: Juan Ramón Loubriel Stadium; Attendance: 1,069

August 14, 2010 Round 22	Miami FC	3–3	FC Tampa Bay	Fort Lauderdale, FL
7:30 PM EDT	Chijindu 19'; Martins 42'; Nuñez 82'	Report	Galindo 33'; King 45' 56'	Stadium: Lockhart Stadium; Attendance: 1,855

August 19, 2010 Round 23	FC Tampa Bay	1–1	Vancouver Whitecaps FC	Tampa, FL
7:30 PM EDT	King 26'	Report	Wagner 7'	Stadium: George M. Steinbrenner Field; Attendance: 2,562

August 25, 2010 Round 24	FC Tampa Bay	1–2	Carolina Railhawks	Tampa, FL
7:30 PM EDT	Sánchez 88'	Report	Bobo 23'; Barbara 40'	Stadium: George M. Steinbrenner Field; Attendance: 1,825

August 29, 2010 Round 25	FC Tampa Bay	2–2	AC St. Louis	Tampa, FL
6:00 PM EDT	Steele 43'; Diaz 90'	Report	Valentino 5' (o.g.); Ambersley 19'	Stadium: George M. Steinbrenner Field; Attendance: 3,389

September 11, 2010 Round 26	Rochester Rhinos	3–0	FC Tampa Bay	Rochester, NY
7:00 PM EDT	Greenfield 41' (pen.); Kissi 45'; Rosenlund 49'	Report		Stadium: Marina Auto Stadium; Attendance: 8,197

September 16, 2010 Round 27	FC Tampa Bay	1–1	Austin Aztex FC	Tampa, FL
7:30 PM EDT	King 90+'	Report	M. Griffin 50'	Stadium: George M. Steinbrenner Field; Attendance: 1,698

September 19, 2010 Round 28	Montreal Impact	3–0	FC Tampa Bay	Montreal, Quebec, Canada
2:00 PM EDT	Donatelli 10' (pen.); Gerba 45', 82'	Report		Stadium: Saputo Stadium; Attendance: 13,034

September 24, 2010 Round 29	FC Tampa Bay	1–3	NSC Minnesota Stars	Tampa, FL
7:30 PM EDT	Galindo 73'	Report	Rodríguez 14'; Bracalello 39'; Takada 44'	Stadium: George M. Steinbrenner Field; Attendance: 3,006

October 1, 2010 Round 30	FC Tampa Bay	6–3	Crystal Palace Baltimore	Tampa, FL
7:30 PM EDT	Burt 3'; King 12', 60'; Gyorio 13', 29'; Sánchez 70' (pen.)	Report	Neto 39'; Cherneski 62', 65'	Stadium: George M. Steinbrenner Field; Attendance: 4,348

=== Ponce De Leon Cup ===
The Ponce De Leon Cup was a fan-based derby and trophy that was created in 2006. Participants were originally United Soccer Leagues first division teams (later USSF-D2, then NASL teams) based in lands that Spanish explorer Juan Ponce de León had visited; namely Florida and Puerto Rico. It was awarded to the club with the best record in league games versus the other participants. FC Tampa Bay and Puerto Rico were level on points, wins, goal differential, head-to-head meetings, goals for, and goals against. Tampa Bay was declared the winner by virtue of scoring five away goals to the Islanders' three.

Pos	Team	Pld	W	D	L	GF	GA	GD	AG	Pts
1	FC Tampa Bay	8	2	5	1	10	8	+2	5	11
2	Puerto Rico Islanders	8	2	5	1	10	8	+2	3	11
3	Miami FC	8	0	6	2	10	14	−4	4	6

== U.S. Open Cup ==
=== Bracket ===
Second Round winners advance to play one of 8 MLS clubs in 16-team knockout tournament
Home teams listed on top of bracket

First Round
D2 Pro	(Florida) Miami FC (AET)	5
PDL	Central Florida Kraze	1
USASA	(Texas) Legends FC	0
D2 Pro	(Florida) FC Tampa Bay	3

Second Round
D2 Pro	(Florida) Miami FC (AET)	2
D2 Pro	(Florida) FC Tampa Bay	1

=== Games ===
June 15, 2010 First Round	Legends FC (Texas)	0–3	(Florida) FC Tampa Bay	Dallas, TX
9:00 PM EDT		Report	Burt 2'; Adjeman-Pamboe 38'; King 85'	Stadium: Richland Stadium; Attendance: 150; Referee: Jorge Luna

June 22, 2010 Second Round	Miami FC (Florida)	2–1 (a.e.t.)	(Florida) FC Tampa Bay	Fort Lauderdale, FL
7:30 PM EDT	Araujo 2'; Thompson 98' (pen.)	Report	Diaz 82'	Stadium: Lockhart Stadium; Attendance: 972; Referee: Mark Kadlecik
