= Kljestan =

Kljestan is a surname. Notable people with the surname include:

- Gordon Kljestan (born 1983), American soccer player
- Sacha Kljestan (born 1985), American soccer player
