= Josh Cameron =

Josh Cameron may refer to:

- Josh Cameron (American football) (born 2003), American professional football wide receiver
- Josh Cameron (soccer) (born 1986), American soccer player
