= Centennial High School (Oregon) =

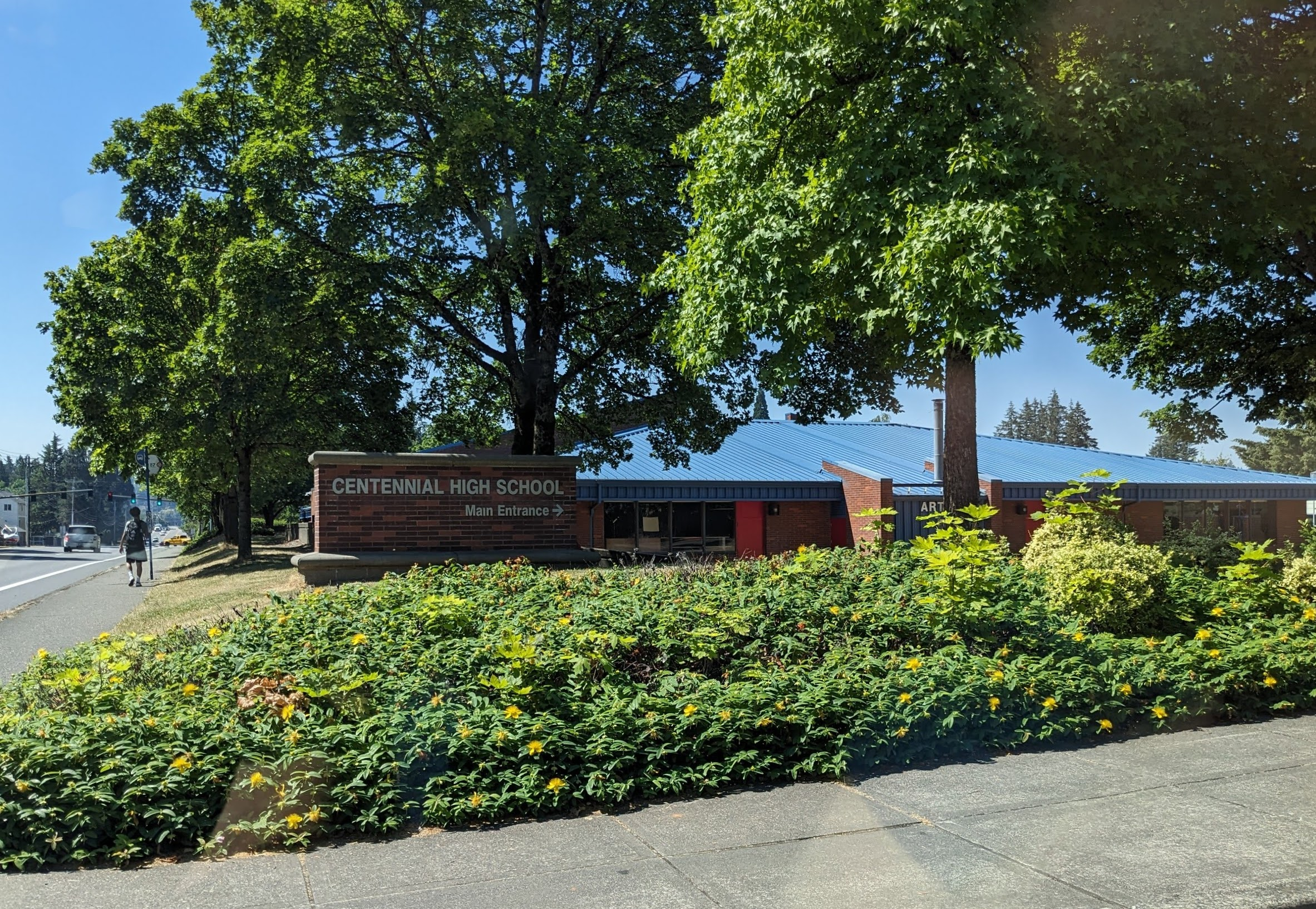

Location
- 3505 SE 182nd Ave; Gresham, Oregon 97030; United States; 45.496383°N 122.475838°W

Information
- Type: Public
- Opened: 1959
- School district: Centennial School District
- Principal: Alexa Pearson
- Teaching staff: 64.82 (FTE)
- Grades: 9–12
- Enrollment: 1,731 (2024-2025)
- Student to teacher ratio: 26.70
- Colors: Scarlet and blue
- Athletics conference: OSAA Northwest Oregon Conference 5A-1
- Mascot: Eagle
- Rival: Parkrose High School
- Newspaper: Talon
- Feeder schools: Centennial Middle School, Oliver Middle School
- Website: Centennial High School

Centennial High School (CHS) is a public high school located in Gresham, Oregon, United States. It is the only high school in the Centennial School District.

== Academics ==
In 1989, Centennial High School was honored in the Blue Ribbon Schools Program, the highest honor a school can receive in the United States.

In 2008, 76% of the school's seniors received a high school diploma. Of 411 students, 311 graduated, 73 dropped out, eight received a modified diploma, and 19 were still in high school in 2009.

In 2012, Kevin Ricker was named the Oregon High School Principal of the Year. Along with making other improvements in the school, he was awarded this title primarily for leading CHS students to raise both reading and math test scores by 12% in one year.

In 2016, Katharine Dean, a science teacher of Centennial High School won Presidential Award for Excellence in Mathematics and Science Teaching.

== Activities ==
Centennial's marching band has won the Portland Grand Floral Parade more than 20 times, including 12 times consecutively. The band's 2000 fall field show, "Gloria", held the record for the highest scoring show in the Northwest Marching Band Circuit.

Centennial's Future Business Leaders of America chapter has won the 6A Chapter of the Year title for five years in a row.

In 2016, a Centennial High School senior Grace Ramstad was crowned the 2016 Rose Festival Queen.

As of 2025, the centennial High School has multiple active clubs; Band, Choir, Drama, FBLA, HTAC, Key Club, MECHA, Racquetball, Speech and Debate, Student Council, Yearbook, Book club, Screen Printing club, Homework and Tutoring, and Spanish language Arts.

== Sports ==
Centennial hosts a track meet called the Centennial Invitational, which is one of the largest high school track meets in the region.

=== State championships ===
- Football: 1972
- Boys' track and field: 1967
- Girls' track and field: 1976
- Boys' soccer: 1983
- Girls' soccer: 2000
- Dance and drill: 1988, 1990, 2003, and 2010
- Winterguard: 2010
- Marching band: 1999, 2000
- Choir: 1993, 1994
- Bowling: 2008
- Bass Fishing Championships

== Notable alumni ==
- Scott Benedetti, soccer player
- Earl Blumenauer (1966), Member of the U.S. House of Representatives from Oregon's 3rd congressional district
- Josh Cameron, soccer player
- Marco Farfan, soccer player
- Todd Field (1982), six-time Academy Award-nominated filmmaker
- Robert Garrigus, golfer
- Katie Harman (1999), Miss America 2002
- Rick Metsger, Oregon politician
- Nico Santos, Filipino-American actor
- Megan Langenfeld, former collegiate All-American, softball pitcher and current assistant coach
- Tammy Munro, actress

== Major events ==
Three of the main feeder elementary schools into Centennial Middle School and therefore Centennial High School have been renamed, with some controversy. Lynch Wood Elementary, Lynch View Elementary, and Lynch Meadows Elementary were named after the Lynch family who originally donated the land, but renamed after a school board vote due to the word's connotations with racial violence. Today, they are known respectively as Powell Butte Elementary, Patrick Lynch Elementary, and Meadows Elementary.
