= Bayside, Nova Scotia =

Community in Nova Scotia, Canada

Coordinates: 44°32′00″N 63°48′01″W

Bayside in Nova Scotia

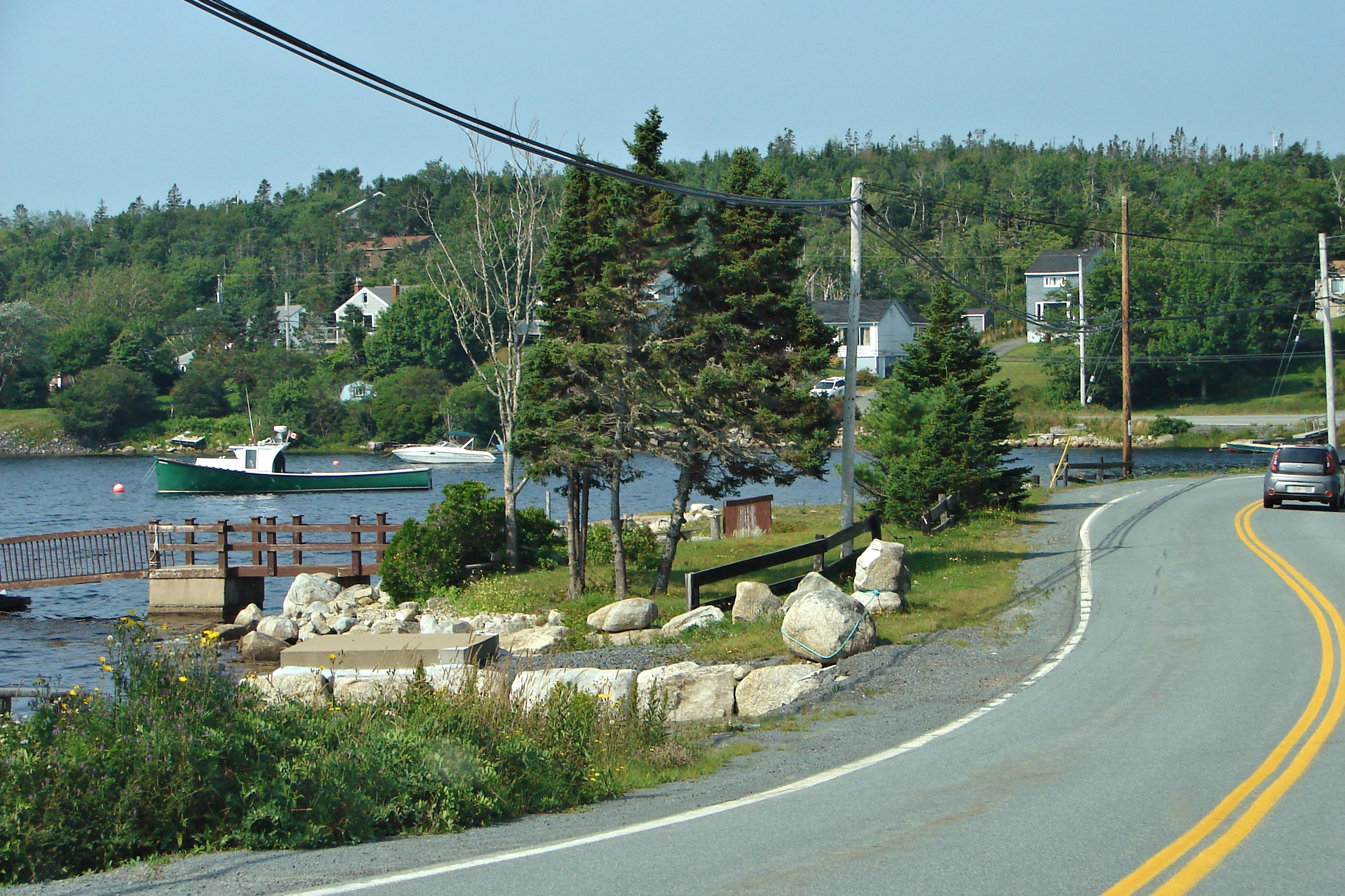
Bayside

Bayside is a small community in the Halifax Regional Municipality Nova Scotia, Canada. It is about 19 kilometres (12 mi) from Halifax. Bayside is situated on the shore of Shad Bay on the Atlantic Ocean. The community is on the Prospect Road (Route 333) which runs on the Chebucto Peninsula.

The area includes a golf course called Granite Springs. The first three digits of the postal Code for the area is B3Z. The telephone exchange is 902 852-Aliant.

== Notable people ==
- Derek Gaudet
