= Matt Pyzdrowski =

American soccer player

Personal information
- Full name: Matthew Robert Pyzdrowski
- Date of birth: August 17, 1986 (age 40)
- Place of birth: Hinsdale, Illinois, United States
- Height: 6 ft 4 in (1.93 m)
- Position: Goalkeeper

Youth career
- 2006–2009: Marquette Golden Eagles

Senior career*
Years	Team	Apps	(Gls)
2007	Chicago Fire Premier	18	(0)
2010	Portland Timbers	3	(0)
2011–2014	Ängelholms FF	105	(0)
2015–2017	Helsingborgs IF	33	(0)
2018–2019	Varbergs BoIS	29	(0)
- * Club domestic league appearances and goals as of 1 January 2020

Matt Pyzdrowski (born August 17, 1986, in Hinsdale, Illinois) is a retired American soccer player and analyst, who played as a goalkeeper.

== Career ==
=== College and amateur ===
Pyzdrowski attended Fenwick High School in Oak Park, Illinois, played club soccer for HUSA soccer club, and played college soccer at the Marquette University from 2006 to 2009. He was named to the NSCAA All-Wisconsin team as a senior in 2009, and over his four years at Marquette received BIG EAST Goalkeeper of the Week honors on several occasions. He finished his career ranked fifth on the school's all-time list of goalkeepers with a 1.37 goals against average, 11 career shutouts and 206 career saves.

During his college years Pyzdrowski also played one season with the Chicago Fire Premier in the USL Premier Development League.

=== Professional ===
Pyzdrowski turned professional in 2010 when he signed with the Portland Timbers in the USSF Division-2 Professional League. He made his professional debut on April 22, 2010, in a game against AC St. Louis. He made his first professional start on August 21, 2010, against Minnesota where he made 3 saves en route to his first career shutout and a 1–0 victory.

Pyzdrowski left the Timbers following the conclusion of the 2010 USSFD2 season, and on March 1, 2011, signed with Ängelholm of Sweden's Superettan after a week-long trial where he impressed in a friendly match against Allsvenskan side Trelleborg FF and helped secure a 3–2 victory for Ängelholm.

In Pyzdrowski's first season as a starter for Ängelholm he appeared in every minute of every game leading the squad to 15 wins, 8 draws and 7 losses while racking up 8 shutouts and a third-place finish in the Swedish Superettan. Ängelholm qualified for the Allsvenskan promotion playoffs where they fell just short against Allsvenskan side Syrianska FC, 4–3 over two games. After the season, he received the 2011 Ängelholms FF "player of the year" award.

Pyzdrowski has worked as a goalkeeping analyst for The Athletic since 2018.
