= Jonny Steele =

Northern Irish footballer

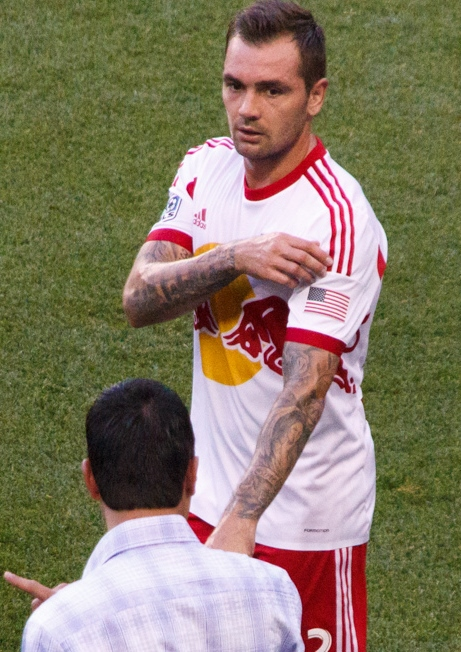
- Steele with the New York Red Bulls, talking to head coach Mike Petke, 2013

Personal information
- Full name: Jonathan Steele
- Date of birth: 7 February 1986 (age 40)
- Place of birth: Larne, County Antrim, Northern Ireland
- Position: Midfielder

Youth career
- 2002–2004: Wolverhampton Wanderers

Senior career*
Years	Team	Apps	(Gls)
2004	Syracuse Salty Dogs	9	(1)
2004–2005	Kansas City Comets (indoor)	13	(8)
2005–2006	Rochester Raging Rhinos	18	(1)
2005–2007	Baltimore Blast (indoor)	39	(13)
2006	Ballymena United	5	(0)
2007	Carolina RailHawks	19	(0)
2007–2008	Philadelphia KiXX (indoor)	17	(7)
2008–2009	Puerto Rico Islanders	49	(7)
2010	Vancouver Whitecaps	13	(0)
2010–2011	FC Tampa Bay	10	(1)
2011	→ Carolina RailHawks (loan)	26	(0)
2011–2012	Arizona Storm (indoor)	12	(2)
2012	Syracuse Silver Knights (indoor)	1	(0)
2012	Real Salt Lake	29	(2)
2013–2014	New York Red Bulls	48	(6)
2014	Newcastle Jets	2	(0)
2015	Minnesota United	5	(0)
2016	Ottawa Fury	12	(0)
2016–2018	Miami FC	18	(2)
2018	Miami FC 2	10	(1)
2019	Ramsgate	4	(0)

International career
	Northern Ireland U16	13	(0)
	Northern Ireland U17	7	(0)
	Northern Ireland U18	3	(2)
	Northern Ireland U19	13	(0)
2013–2014	Northern Ireland	3	(0)
- * Club domestic league appearances and goals as of 13:12, 10 June 2021 (UTC)

Jonathan Steele (born 7 February 1986) is a Northern Irish professional footballer. He has also received three caps for the Northern Ireland national team.

== Early life ==
Steele was raised in a Catholic family along with three brothers in the predominantly Protestant town of Larne, about 25 miles outside of Belfast. Steele often experienced religious violence and persecution resulting from The Troubles, including being attacked outside of a video rental store. Because of this violence, Steele's mother pleaded with him to leave home and the best opportunity to play football came from Wolverhampton Wanderers. After two years of not being able to make a breakthrough with Wolverhampton, Steele was released after the 2002–2003 season. At the age of 18, he then decided to try to earn a contract elsewhere in Europe or with Major League Soccer of the United States instead of returning home to Northern Ireland.

== Club ==
=== England ===
Steele started his career with Wolverhampton Wanderers in England between 2002 and 2004. Although he featured for the youth and reserve sides, never played a game for the senior team.

=== United States ===
Steele moved to the United States in 2003, for an ultimately unsuccessful trial with the Dallas Burn of Major League Soccer. Instead, he signed with the Syracuse Salty Dogs of the USL First Division in 2004. and that fall, he joined the Kansas City Comets of Major Indoor Soccer League. He played thirteen games before the Comets placed him on the inactive roster to allow him to compete with the Northern Ireland U-19 national team. He returned to the United States in 2005 and spent the summer with the Rochester Rhinos. As the Comets had folded at the end of the 2004–2005 season, the Baltimore Blast selected Steele with the 26th pick in the Dispersal Draft.

=== Return home ===
He returned home to Northern Ireland in August 2005 and had a short spell with Irish League side Ballymena United, before returning to America when his short-term contract expired.

=== Return to the United States ===
He won the 2006 MISL Championship with the Blast, and played for the Rhinos again in the summer of 2006. In the spring of 2007, he signed with the expansion Carolina RailHawks of the USL First Division. He was also the first pick of the expansion Orlando Sharks in the 2007 MISL Expansion Draft, but was traded to the Philadelphia KiXX in exchange for Gaston Pernia. Steele played seventeen games with the KiXX during the 2007–2008 MISL season, missing part of the season with a foot injury.

In the spring of 2008, he moved to the Puerto Rico Islanders of USL-1. He was a key part of a team which took the USL-1 championship and was named the 2008 USL-1 MVP.

On 23 December 2009, Steele signed a one-year contract with Vancouver Whitecaps. Steele, along with Whitecaps teammate Ricardo Sánchez, was transferred to league rivals FC Tampa Bay on 21 July 2010.

Carolina RailHawks, now in the second division North American Soccer League, re-acquired Steele on a season-long loan from FC Tampa Bay on 24 February 2011.

Steele signed with Syracuse Silver Knights of Major Indoor Soccer League for the 2011–12 indoor season on 23 September 2011. He was released from the team mid-season.

=== Major League Soccer ===
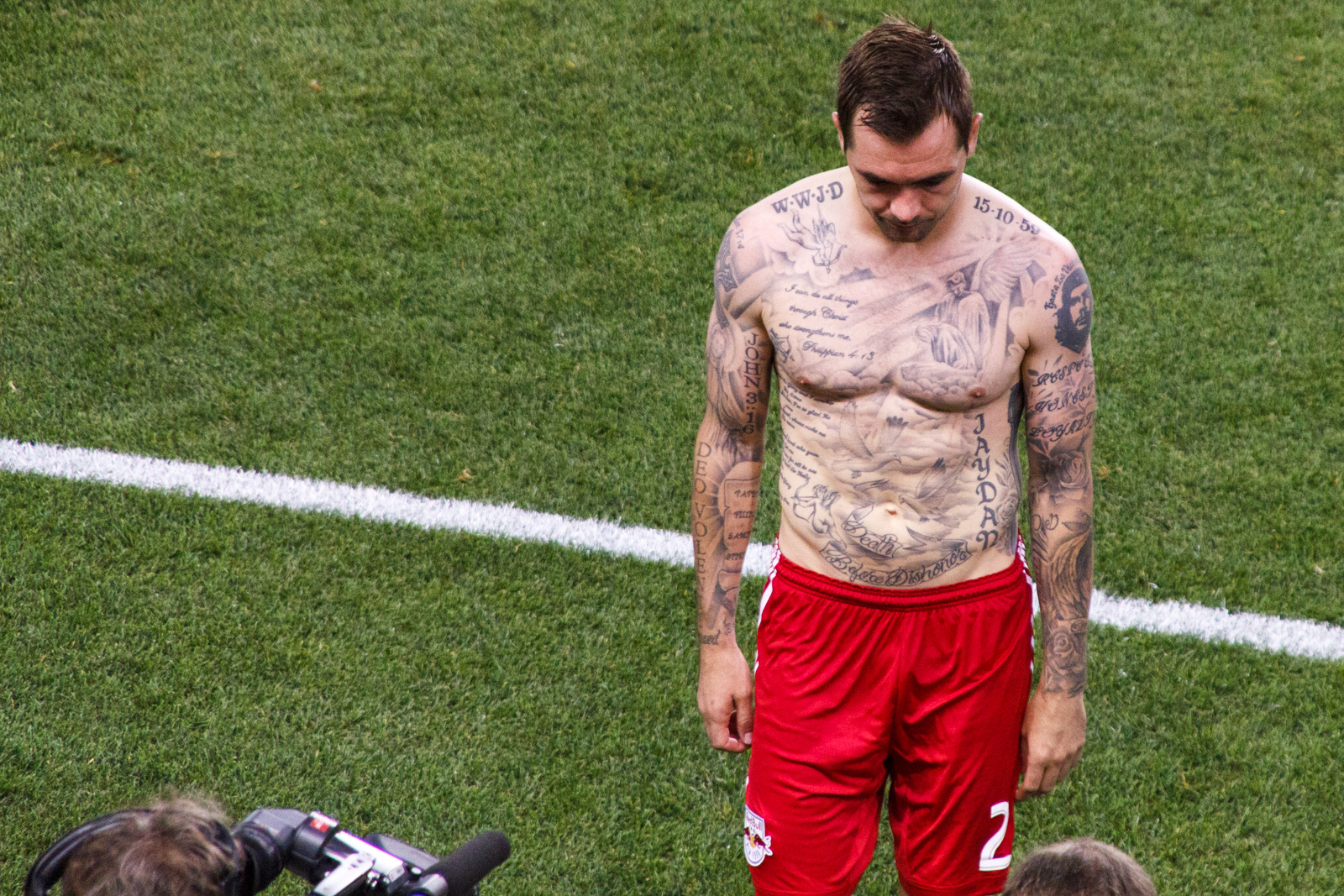
Steele with the New York Red Bulls in 2013.

On 23 February 2012 Steele tweeted that he had joined Real Salt Lake of Major League Soccer, a club from which he spurned a contract offer two years earlier in favour of joining the Vancouver Whitecaps. The signing was official on 24 February 2012. During his first season with the club, Steele made 28 appearances, including 11 starts, tallying two assists and scoring two goals including a stoppage-time game winner against Toronto FC on 28 April 2012.

Steele's option was declined by Salt Lake on 3 December 2012 as part of a salary cap issue, along with the trade and release of six other players, including starters Jamison Olave, Fabian Espindola, and Will Johnson.

After being released by RSL, Steele trained with Cliftonville F.C. of the IFA Premiership and was reportedly days away from signing for an unnamed League 2 club before being contacted by New York Red Bull's head coach Mike Petke. Steele signed with the Major League Soccer club on 20 February 2013 and solidified his spot in the starting line-up. Steele scored his first goal for the Red Bulls on 20 April 2013 in a 4–1 victory over the New England Revolution. In the same match, Steele tallied his second assist of the season on a goal by Thierry Henry. Steele ended his first season with New York making 36 official appearances and scoring 6 goals, while the team finished with the best overall record in MLS, winning the Supporter's Shield, the first major honor in club history.

In 2014, Steele made 16 appearances, scoring one goal and recording 2 assists, but only started 7 matches. He and the Red Bulls mutually agreed to part ways on 10 July 2014.

=== Newcastle Jets ===
Three days after parting ways with the Red Bulls, it was confirmed that Steele had signed for the Newcastle Jets of the A-League in Australia.

Steele and Newcastle Jets mutually agreed to terminate his contract on 23 December 2014.

=== Minnesota United FC ===
On 8 January 2015, Minnesota United FC announced the signing of Jonny Steele. After a disappointing showing due to injuries, Steele was released by United on 1 July 2015.

=== Ottawa Fury ===
Steele signed a contract with Ottawa Fury FC on 12 January 2016.

=== Miami FC ===
Steele moved again on 14 July 2016, this time to NASL side Miami FC.

=== Ramsgate ===
At the end of May 2019 it was announced that Steele had joined Ramsgate. He was released by Ramsgate on 21 October 2019.

== International ==
Steele represented Northern Ireland from the Under-15 to the Under-19 level. In 2001, he was part of the Under-16 side that competed in the Victory Shield tournament against the other British nations. Steele earned three caps for the Under-19 side in the 2005 UEFA European Under-19 Championship against Germany, Serbia and Montenegro, and Greece in Group A. The tournament was held in his native Northern Ireland but the hosts did not advance past the group stage. Steele was also a member of the U19 squad that competed in the 2005 Milk Cup and scored a goal against the United States during a 4–2 loss in the final.

In April 2013, following Steele's impressive performances with New York, Northern Ireland manager Michael O'Neill stated that he was monitoring Steele's progress and that he could receive his first call up as early as the next squad selection. Seven months later, Steele received his first call up to the senior squad for a friendly against Turkey to be played on 15 November 2013 in Adana after originally being left out of the squad again because of expected club commitments. This call up was the first time Steele was called into camp for Northern Ireland at any level since the 2005 Milk Cup.

Steele made his senior international debut for Northern Ireland in the match against Turkey, coming on as a 67th-minute substitute for Niall McGinn as Northern Ireland lost 1–0. In May 2014, Steele was again called up for the friendly away matches against Uruguay and Chile on 30 May and 4 June respectively as the opposition prepared for the 2014 FIFA World Cup.

== Personal life ==
Steele has several tattoos on his body, including his surname on his back, Che Guevara, an Irish cross and the words 'Father, Son, Holy Spirit' in Latin on his arm. He mentioned of fathered a child, Jaydan, from America.

== International career statistics ==
As of match played 20 November 2013.

Northern Ireland national team
Year	Apps	Goals
2013	1	0
2014	2	0
Total	3	0

== Honours ==
Puerto Rico Islanders

- Commissioner's Cup: 2008

New York Red Bulls

- MLS Supporters' Shield: 2013

Individual

- USL First Division MVP: 2008

== Gallery ==
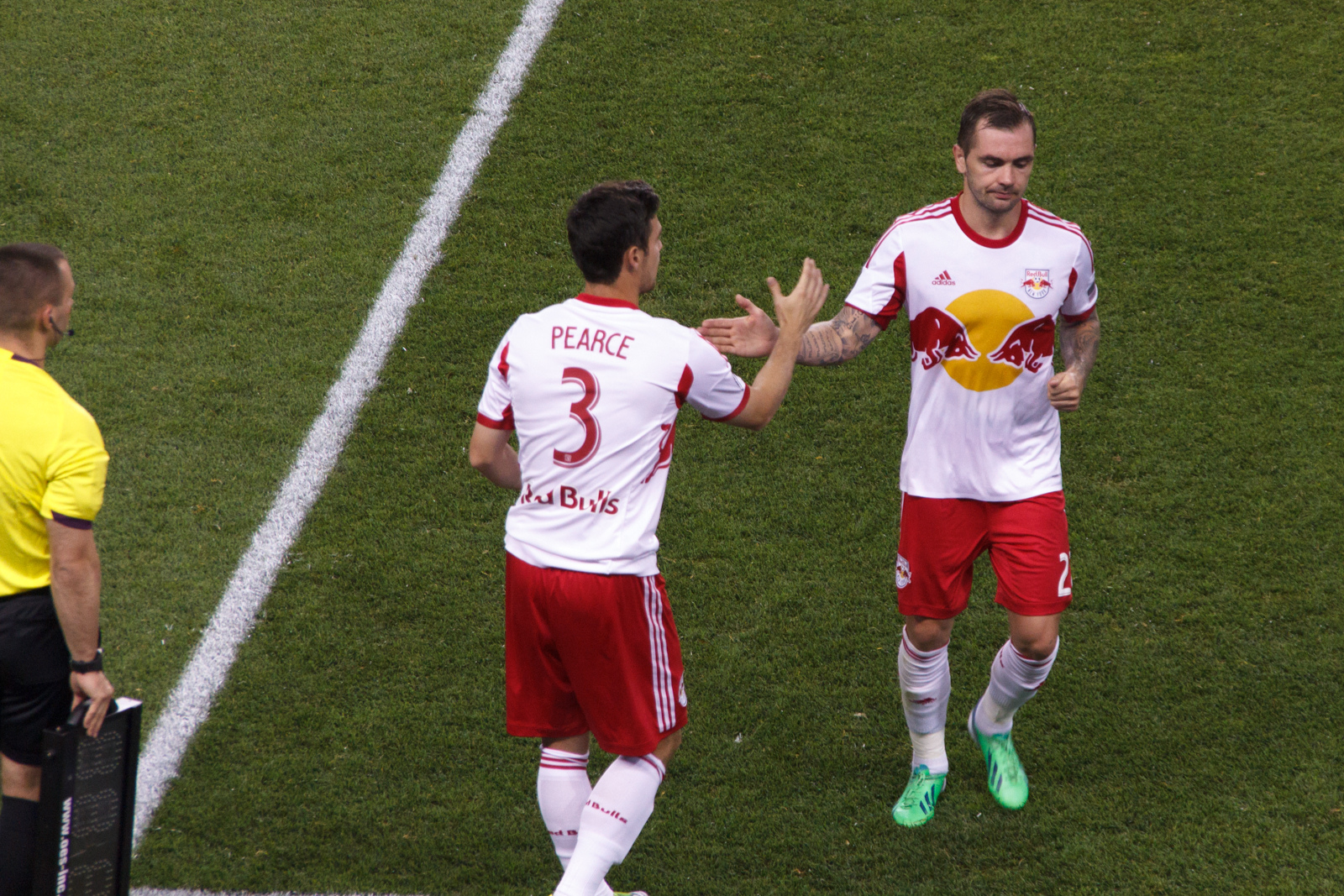

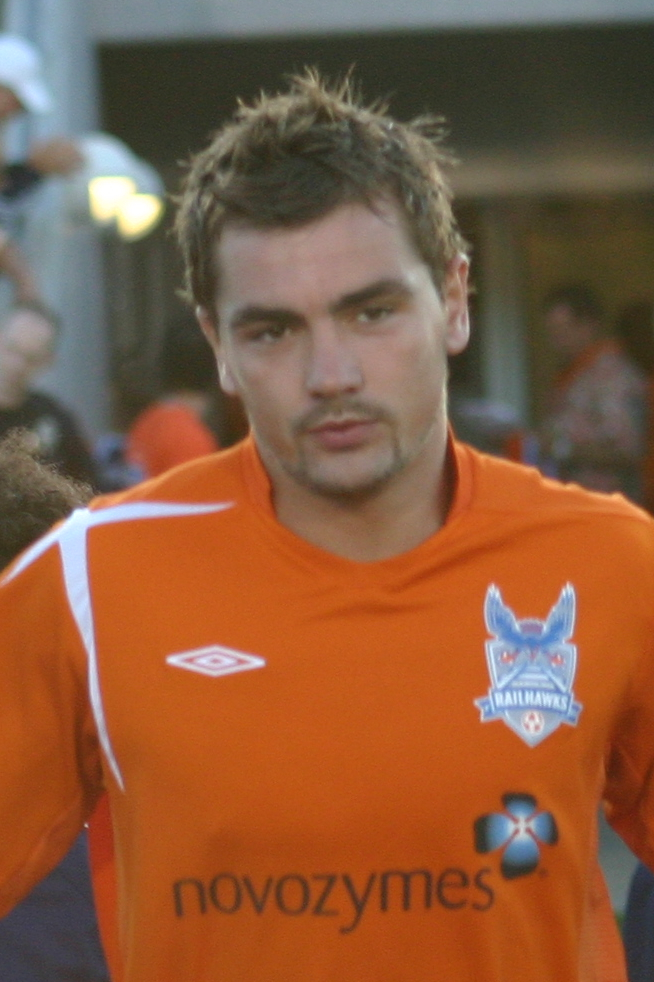

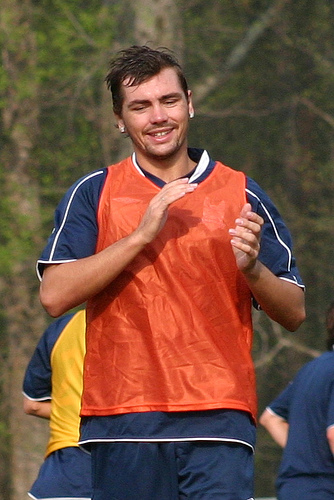
