= Quavas Kirk =

American soccer player

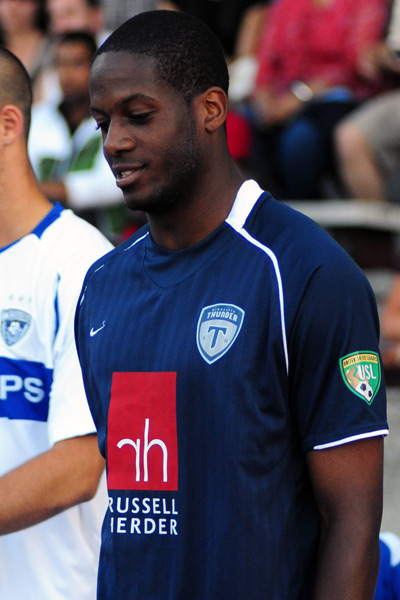

Personal information
- Date of birth: April 13, 1988 (age 38)
- Place of birth: Aurora, Illinois, United States
- Height: 6 ft 1 in (1.85 m)
- Positions: Full back; winger

Youth career
- 2003–2005: IMG Soccer Academy

Senior career*
Years	Team	Apps	(Gls)
2005–2007	Los Angeles Galaxy	34	(0)
2008	D.C. United	10	(1)
2009	Minnesota Thunder	15	(0)
2010	Portland Timbers	17	(0)
2011–2012	Rochester Rhinos	36	(2)
2014	Schwaben AC		

International career
2003–2005	United States U17	53	(22)
- * Club domestic league appearances and goals

Quavas Kirk (born April 13, 1988) is an American professional soccer player.

== Career ==
=== Youth ===
Kirk did not play college soccer; he joined the U.S. U-17 Residency Program at the IMG Soccer Academy in Bradenton, Florida, before signing a Generation adidas contract in 2005.

=== Professional ===
Kirk was drafted in the 3rd round (34th overall) of the 2005 MLS SuperDraft by Los Angeles Galaxy. He made his MLS debut in 2006, and scored his first professional goal on August 1, 2006, in the Lamar Hunt U.S. Open Cup in a 2-0 fourth-round win over Dallas Roma.

Until the arrival of David Beckham, Kirk wore the number 23 shirt for the Galaxy. However, despite publicly announcing his desire to retain the jersey, he was handed the number 15 to accommodate Beckham, who prefers to wear number 7 or 23. (Beckham had chosen the number 23 because 7 was already taken when he was transferred to Real Madrid by Raul, and also because he admires Michael Jordan).

On February 15, 2008, Kirk was traded to D.C. United in exchange for the rights to Greg Vanney He scored his first career league goal on August 23, 2008, in a 3-0 DC win over the Colorado Rapids.

In January 2009, Kirk was waived by D.C. United. After a brief trial with Seattle Sounders FC, Kirk signed with Minnesota Thunder on 17 February 2009. He made 15 league appearances for the Thunder in 2009, before being released from his contract as a result of Thunder's financial problems following the conclusion of the 2009 USL First Division season. He was signed by the Portland Timbers on December 7, 2009.

Kirk trialled with the Portland Timbers, looking to secure a place on their roster prior to their first season in Major League Soccer in 2011, but suffered a hamstring injury in a pre-season game against Ventura County Fusion, and was not offered a contract by the team. Kirk subsequently signed with Rochester Rhinos of the USL Pro league on March 25, 2011. He re-signed with Rochester in January 2012.

After a couple seasons with Schwaben FC out of Buffalo Grove, Illinois, Kirk played for amateur side Stare Byki FC out of Oak Brook, Illinois.

=== International ===
Kirk had been a standout in the United States' under-17 national team, scoring 22 goals in 53 games. He played in the 2005 U-17 World Championship, and was expected to play a key role for the U-20 national team in the 2007 FIFA U-20 World Cup but picked up a pre-tournament injury and was excluded from the roster.

=== Coaching ===
Kirk is the Director of Private Training at Soccer Speed.
