= Derek Gaudet =

Canadian soccer player (born 1989)

Personal information
- Date of birth: May 14, 1989 (age 37)
- Place of birth: Bayside, Nova Scotia, Canada
- Height: 5 ft 9 in (1.75 m)
- Position: Forward

Team information
- Current team: Halifax County United
- Number: 11

Youth career
- 2001–2003: Halifax County United

College career
Years	Team	Apps	(Gls)
2012–2013	Saint Mary's Huskies	22	(11)

Senior career*
Years	Team	Apps	(Gls)
2004–2008	Halifax Dunbrack	56	(10)
2008–2009	Toronto FC	1	(0)
2009–2010	Halifax Dunbrack	11	(3)
2010	Portland Timbers	8	(0)
2011	Halifax Dunbrack	5	(2)
2013–?	Halifax Dunbrack		
?-2023	Dartmouth United FC		
2025	Halifax County United	11	(3)

International career
2006	Canada U-17	4	(0)
2008–2009	Canada U-20	7	(0)

Managerial career
- 2014–2015: Halifax Dunbrack Senior Women "A"
- 2012–2013: Sackville United (Technical coach)
- 2012–?: High Performance Futbol Academy
- * Club domestic league appearances and goals

Derek Gaudet (born May 14, 1989) is a Canadian soccer player who plays as a forward for Halifax County United in the Nova Scotia Soccer League.

== Playing career ==
=== Club ===
Gaudet was born in Bayside, Nova Scotia. He began his career with Halifax County United and signed in 2004 with Halifax Dunbrack where he played for four years. Gaudet signed a contract with Toronto FC in August 2008. He made his professional debut on September 6, 2008, coming on as a substitute for Diaz Kambere against Chivas USA. On March 3, 2010, the Portland Timbers announced the signing of Gaudet to a contract for the 2010 season. Gaudet played two years for Saint Mary's Huskies.

=== International ===
Gaudet was a member of the Canadian U-15, U-17 and U-20 national teams. He has also represented Nova Scotia at numerous national championships and at the 2005 Canada Games. On January 18, 2010, earned his first call-up for the Canada men's national soccer team for a training camp in Florida.

== Coaching career ==
Head coach of Halifax Dunbrack Sr. Women's "A". Winning 4 provincial titles in 2014, 2015, 2016 and 2017 On June 12, 2012, was named Technical coach of youth players at Sackville United Soccer Club Gaudet formed also in June 2012 the High Performance Futbol Academy in Halifax, Nova Scotia.

== Honours ==
- 2009: Nova Scotia Soccer League Premiership MVP
