= Ibad Muhamadu =

Dutch footballer (born 1982)

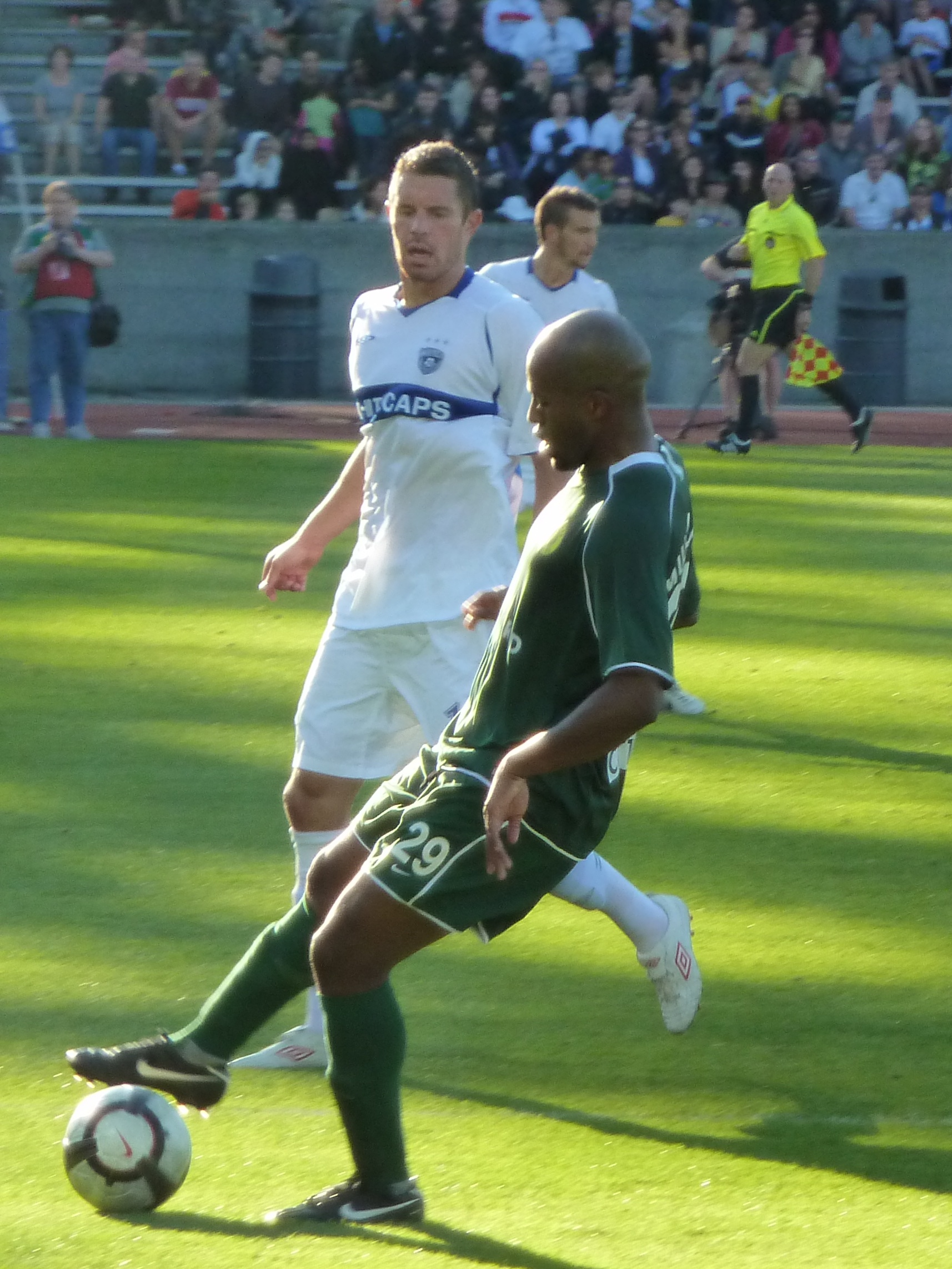
- Ibad Muhamadu playing for the Portland Timbers, 2 October 2010

Personal information
- Full name: Ibad Ibn Bashir Muhamadu
- Date of birth: 22 February 1982 (age 44)
- Place of birth: Amsterdam, Netherlands
- Height: 1.83 m (6 ft 0 in)
- Position: Forward

Youth career
- Always Forward
- HVV Hollandia
- AZ

Senior career*
Years	Team	Apps	(Gls)
2001–2004	Twente	5	(0)
2003–2004	→ Cambuur Leeuwarden (loan)	21	(4)
2004–2005	MVV	54	(17)
2005–2007	Cercle Brugge	12	(2)
2006–2007	→ Dordrecht (loan)	34	(13)
2007–2008	Dordrecht	14	(0)
2008–2009	Willem II	18	(1)
2009	Dynamo Dresden	3	(0)
2009–2010	Dordrecht	18	(8)
2010	Portland Timbers	10	(0)
2010–2011	Helmond Sport	12	(1)
2011–2013	Spakenburg	25	(7)
- * Club domestic league appearances and goals as of 16 March 2014 (UTC)

Ibad Muhamadu (born 22 February 1982) is a Dutch former professional footballer.

== Career ==
=== Europe ===
When Muhamadu was young, he moved with his parents from Amsterdam to Hoorn, where he started playing football. He got his first professional contract with FC Twente. When René Vandereycken became head coach of Twente, Muhamadu was loaned to Cambuur.

He went to MVV in 2004. After his time in Maastricht he got transferred to the Jupiler League at Cercle Brugge. However, due to lack of convincing results, Muhamadu was never able to achieve a regular spot in the starting eleven. He went to FC Dordrecht, where he would later also find his Dutch former Cercle Brugge teammate Brian Pinas.

In May 2008, Muhamadu signed a contract with Willem II Tilburg and left the club after one year to sign with Dynamo Dresden on 9 June 2009. After just two months at Dynamo, and three league appearances, his contract was annulled in August 2009. He returned to Dordrecht a few days later.

=== North America ===
In August 2010, Muhamadu signed with the American second division club, Portland Timbers, who joined Major League Soccer in 2011.

=== Return to Europe ===
In December 2010, he signed with Dutch second division club Helmond Sport on an amateur contract. He will join amateur side SV Spakenburg from 1 July 2011.

== Personal ==
Muhamadu is of Ghanaian and Surinamese descent. Roland Alberg is his younger brother.
