= Doug DeMartin =

American soccer player

Personal information
- Full name: Doug DeMartin
- Date of birth: July 4, 1986 (age 40)
- Place of birth: Mason, Michigan, United States
- Height: 6 ft 0 in (1.83 m)
- Position: Forward

Youth career
- 2004–2008: Michigan State Spartans

Senior career*
Years	Team	Apps	(Gls)
2005	Michigan Bucks	8	(1)
2006	West Michigan Edge	9	(0)
2007–2008	Michigan Bucks	29	(9)
2010	Portland Timbers	19	(0)
- * Club domestic league appearances and goals as of October 20, 2010

Doug DeMartin (born July 4, 1986, in Mason, Michigan) is an American soccer player who last played for Portland Timbers in the USSF Division-2 Professional League.

== Career ==
=== College and amateur ===
DeMartin played college soccer at Michigan State University for four years from 2004 to 2008, scoring 38 goals and tallying 85 points. During his senior season at Michigan State, he was named Big Ten Player of the Year, Offensive Player of the Big Ten Championship, NSCAA second team All-America, as well as First-Team ESPN The Magazine Academic All-America.

During his college years, he also spent three seasons in the USL Premier Development League, playing for West Michigan Edge and the Michigan Bucks.

=== Professional ===
DeMartin was drafted in the second round (22nd overall) of the 2009 MLS SuperDraft by the Kansas City Wizards,

After a year out of competitive soccer DeMartin signed with USSF D2 Pro League club Portland Timbers in February 2010.
