= Ross Smith (soccer) =

Canadian soccer player and broadcaster

Personal information
- Full name: Ross Graham Smith
- Date of birth: 4 November 1980 (age 45)
- Place of birth: Guelph, Ontario, Canada
- Height: 6 ft 0 in (1.83 m)
- Position: Defender

Team information
- Current team: Ebbsfleet United
- Number: 16

Youth career
- 1999–2002: Rhode Island Rams

Senior career*
Years	Team	Apps	(Gls)
- Montrose
2004–2005	Margate		
2005–2007	Ebbsfleet United	80	(6)
2007–2008	Dagenham & Redbridge	23	(1)
2008	Rochester Rhinos	15	(2)
2009	Colorado Rapids	0	(0)
2009	Ebbsfleet United		
2010	Portland Timbers	16	(1)
2011	Portland Timbers U23s	1	(0)
2012–13	Ebbsfleet United	13	(0)
- * Club domestic league appearances and goals as of May 7, 2011

Ross Smith (born November 4, 1980) is a former Canadian soccer player and current broadcaster for the Portland Timbers, one of his former teams. Smith last played for Conference National side Ebbsfleet United.

== Career ==
=== Youth and college ===
Smith attended E.C. Drury High School in Milton, Ontario, Perth High School, and played college soccer at the University of Rhode Island. He was named to the Verizon Academic all-District One team, earned third-team All-New England honors, and was also a first-team all-Atlantic 10 performer as a junior in 2001.

=== Professional ===
Smith moved across to the UK where he played with Montrose. Smith signed for Kent based Margate, playing a season there before being spotted and moving on to Gravesend & Northfleet playing in the English Conference National.

At the end of the 2006–07 season, Smith was out of contract and was considering a new contract offer from Ebbsfleet United and also interest from Stevenage Borough, when he had an offer to join Dagenham & Redbridge in League Two, who he eventually signed for in the summer of 2007.

Smith signed with the Rochester Rhinos of the USL First Division on June 18, 2008. He was reported not be eligible to play with the club until July 15, but was cleared by the authorities for his USL debut July 5, 2008, against the Vancouver Whitecaps FC.

On February 27, 2009, it was revealed that Smith's doctors detected a faulty heart valve which caused him to suffer an enlarging of his aorta, and as a result would require heart surgery, and would likely miss the entire 2009 USL1 season.

Smith signed for the Colorado Rapids of the MLS in January 2009, however the contract was terminated once doctors detected a problem with his heart, and he was forced to retire. Smith re-signed for Ebbsfleet United (previously known as Gravesend & Northfleet) in November 2009, after having surgery and being told by doctors it was safe to play again. In December, he said he was planning to leave Ebbsfleet to return to the United States.

On February 15, 2010, Smith signed with Portland Timbers. Following the season, and with the Timbers move to Major League Soccer, Smith ended his playing career, and on March 10, 2011, he was named as a radio analyst for Timbers home matches. On January 27, 2012, Smith resumed his playing career and signed with Ebbsfleet United for a third spell with the Kent club. That ended in 2013 and since then he has been a TV analyst for all Timbers matches broadcast locally.

== Personal life ==
Although born in Canada, both Smith's parents are Scottish-born giving him dual British and Canadian citizenship.
