= Tye Perdido =

Guamanian footballer

Personal information
- Date of birth: November 28, 1988 (age 37)
- Height: 1.85 m (6 ft 1 in)
- Position: Striker

College career
Years	Team	Apps	(Gls)
2006–2009	Gonzaga Bulldogs		

Senior career*
Years	Team	Apps	(Gls)
2010–2011	Kitsap Pumas		

International career^{‡}
2016	Guam	2	(0)
- * Club domestic league appearances and goals as of 12:44, 16 October 2018 (UTC) ‡ National team caps and goals as of 12:44, 16 October 2018 (UTC)

Tye Perdido (born November 28, 1988) is a former soccer player who played as a striker.

Born in Maui, Perdido played collegiate soccer at Gonzaga University where he would have a trial with Seattle Sounders. He played in the Premier Development League with Kitsap Pumas before retiring due to a knee injury.

Years later, Perdido joined the Guam national football team for a series of friendly matches.
