= Josh Cameron (soccer) =

American soccer player (born 1986)

Personal information
- Date of birth: October 17, 1986 (age 40)
- Place of birth: Portland, Oregon, U.S.
- Height: 5 ft 9 in (1.75 m)
- Position: Midfielder

Youth career
- 2005–2008: Oregon State Beavers

Senior career*
Years	Team	Apps	(Gls)
2009–2010	Portland Timbers	14	(1)
- * Club domestic league appearances and goals as of October 20, 2010

Josh Cameron (born October 17, 1986) is an American soccer player who last played for Portland Timbers in the USSF Division-2 Professional League.

== Career ==
=== College ===
Cameron attended Centennial High School in Gresham, Oregon and played college soccer at Oregon State University, where he totaled four goals and 11 assists. During his collegiate career Cameron played defense, outside midfielder and forward, was a two-time Pac-10 All-Academic honorable mention selection, and guided the Beavers to a tie for fourth place in the 2008 Pac-10 championship. He also played club soccer for West Villa, Eastside United, Lake Oswego and Westside Metros, winning a U-12 state title with West Villa.

=== Professional ===
Cameron signed with the Portland Timbers in January 2009. He made his professional debut on June 13, 2009, as a substitute in a game against Charleston Battery, and scored his first professional goal on June 19, 2010, in a 2–0 win over the NSC Minnesota Stars.
