= Gordon Kljestan =

American soccer player (born 1983)

Personal information
- Full name: Gordon Zdravko Kljestan
- Date of birth: November 30, 1983 (age 42)
- Place of birth: Huntington Beach, California, United States
- Height: 6 ft 0 in (1.83 m)
- Position: Midfielder

College career
| Years | Team | Apps | (Gls) |
| 2003 | Fullerton Titans | 19 | (1) |
| 2004–2006 | Seton Hall Pirates | | |

Senior career*
| Years | Team | Apps | (Gls) |
| 2004–2006 | Orange County Blue Star | 22 | (0) |
| 2007 | Los Angeles Galaxy | 0 | (0) |
| 2007–2008 | New Jersey Ironmen (indoor) | 32 | (2) |
| 2008 | Newark Ironbound Express | 1 | (0) |
| 2008 | New York Red Bulls | 0 | (0) |
| 2009 | Cleveland City Stars | 22 | (0) |
| 2010 | FC Tampa Bay | 12 | (2) |
- * Club domestic league appearances and goals as of September 22, 2010

Gordon Zdravko Kljestan (born November 30, 1983) is a retired American soccer player.

== Career ==
=== College and amateur ===
Kljestan played one year of college soccer for Cal State Fullerton, prior to transferring to Seton Hall University where he played from 2004 to 2006. Kljestan was a three-year starter for the Pirates and was named as a 2006 All-Big East preseason selection and 2005 All-Big East honorable mention.

During his college years, Kljestan also played three seasons for Orange County Blue Star of the USL Premier Development League.

=== Professional ===
Kljestan was drafted by the Los Angeles Galaxy with the 10th overall pick in the first round of the 2007 MLS Supplemental Draft. He started in six games for the Galaxy reserve team, logging 513 minutes, but was waived at the end of the season without making a senior start.

In 2007, Kljestan signed with the New Jersey Ironmen of the Major Indoor Soccer League. He played thirty-two games, scoring two goals. In 2008, he played in one game for his second USL Premier Development League team, Newark Ironbound Express. On June 7, 2008, he started in a 1–1 draw against the Long Island Rough Riders. He started and played for 68 minutes until the game was called off due to weather.

Kljestan signed with the New York Red Bulls on June 25, 2008, after training with the team for weeks. He played in his first match for the New York the following day in a friendly against Chivas Guadalajara, and made his full professional debut for the Red Bulls on 1 July 2008, in a US Open Cup third-round game against Crystal Palace Baltimore. He was waived on November 26, 2008.

He signed with Cleveland City Stars in April 2009 and he played in 22 games.

Kljestan signed with FC Tampa Bay of the USSF Division 2 in April 2010. Appeared in 12 matches, scoring 2 goals as a defender.

Retired from professional soccer in January 2011 and currently works in the Los Angeles Galaxy front office.

Kljestan is currently also a Soccer Player Development instructor and MLS Preseason Meet & Greet speaker for the online sports-career training school Sports Management Worldwide.

== Personal ==
Gordon is the brother of former Chivas USA and current LA Galaxy and former United States national soccer team midfielder Sacha Kljestan. Kljestan's father Slavko Klještan, a Bosnian Serb from Sarajevo, Bosnia and Herzegovina, was a professional player playing for Željezničar Sarajevo.
