= Ricardo Sánchez (footballer) =

Mexican footballer (born 1982)

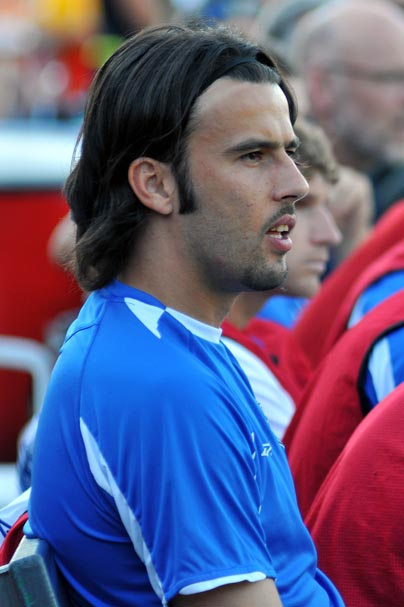

Personal information
- Full name: Ricardo Pascual Sánchez Moreno
- Date of birth: 27 May 1982 (age 44)
- Place of birth: Guadalajara, Mexico
- Height: 6 ft 0 in (1.83 m)
- Position: Midfielder

Youth career
- Atlas

Senior career*
Years	Team	Apps	(Gls)
2004	Atlas		
2004	→ Irapuato (loan)	4	(0)
2004	→ Coatzacoalcos (loan)		
2004	→ Colima (loan)		
2005	Guadalajara	0	(0)
2005	→ Chivas La Piedad (loan)		
2005	→ Chivas Coras Tepic (loan)		
2006	UAT		
2006	Gallos Caliente		
2007	California Victory	23	(0)
2008–2009	Minnesota Thunder	55	(17)
2010	Vancouver Whitecaps	12	(1)
2010	FC Tampa Bay	12	(5)

International career
- Mexico U-17
- * Club domestic league appearances and goals as of October 1, 2010

Ricardo Sánchez (born May 27, 1982) is a former Mexican footballer.

== Career ==
=== Club ===
Sánchez began his career in his native Mexico, playing for numerous Primera División A teams, including the reserve teams of Guadalajara and Atlas in his hometown of Guadalajara, as well as Irapuato, UAT and Querétaro.

Sánchez came to the United States in 2007 to play for the USL First Division expansion franchise California Victory. When the Victory folded at the end of their first season he would sign with the Minnesota Thunder, the same team he scored an overtime goal against in the Open Cup earlier that season. In his first year with the Thunder Sánchez co-lead the team in goals, finishing with 10. He also accumulated four assists during the season.

The 2009 season would be a very productive year for Sánchez. He notched seven goals and co-lead the league in assists with eight, sharing the honor with Wes Knight. Sánchez also finished the season with 72 shots, ranking him second in the league behind Charles Gbeke on 73. At the conclusion of the 2009 season Sánchez was named to the USL First Division All-League First Team.

Following his release from his Thunder contract, Sánchez signed with Vancouver Whitecaps on November 18, 2009. He was traded to FC Tampa Bay, along with Whitecaps teammate Jonny Steele, in July 2010.

Tampa Bay declined his 2011 contract option.

=== International ===
Sánchez has played for the Mexico U-17 national team, captaining the squad which took part in the 1999 U17 World Cup in New Zealand.
