= 2011 NSC Minnesota Stars season =

NSC Minnesota Stars
2011 season
- Owner: Paul Erickson
- Head coach: Manny Lagos
- Stadium: National Sports Center
- NASL: 6th
- NASL Playoffs: Winners
- U.S. Open Cup: Denied Entry
- Top goalscorer: League: Simone Bracalello (6); All: Two Players (6)
- Average home league attendance: 1,676
Home colors	Away colors

The 2011 NSC Minnesota Stars season was the club's first season in the North American Soccer League, the second tier of the American soccer pyramid, and second season of existence.

== Roster ==
As of match played October 29, 2011

No.	Name	Nationality	Position	Date of birth (age)	Signed from	Signed in	Contract ends	Apps.	Goals
Goalkeepers
1	Joe Warren	(United States)	GK	20 October 1974 (aged 37)	Minnesota Thunder	2010		60	0
30	Matt Van Oekel	(United States)	GK	20 September 1986 (aged 25)	Minnesota Thunder	2010		8	0
Defenders
2	Justin Davis	(United States)	DF	6 May 1988 (aged 23)	New Mexico Lobos	2011		28	1
3	Cristiano	(Brazil)	DF	25 May 1986 (aged 25)	Miami	2011		23	0
6	Kevin Friedland	(United States)	DF	3 October 1981 (aged 30)	Kansas City Wizards	2010		25	0
11	Chris Clements	(United States)	DF	2 March 1987 (aged 24)	Minnesota Thunder	2010		43	0
14	Brian Kallman	(United States)	DF	23 April 1984 (aged 27)	Minnesota Thunder	2010		32	1
15	John Gilkerson	(United States)	DF	6 May 1985 (aged 26)	Carolina RailHawks	2011		6	0
16	Kyle Altman	(United States)	DF	31 January 1986 (aged 25)	Minnesota Thunder	2010		64	4
Midfielders
4	Neil Hlavaty	(United States)	MF	27 December 1986 (aged 24)	(Poland) Jagiellonia Białystok	2010		53	10
7	Andrei Gotsmanov	(Belarus)	MF	6 May 1986 (aged 25)	Minnesota Thunder	2010		45	3
8	Daniel Wasson	(United States)	MF	15 June 1984 (aged 27)	(Germany) VfL Osnabrück	2010		31	2
10	Sandy Gbandi	(Liberia)	MF	12 July 1983 (aged 28)	Puerto Rico Islanders	2011		5	0
13	Kentaro Takada	(Japan)	MF	13 April 1983 (aged 28)	Rochester Thunder	2010		42	2
17	Geison Moura	(Brazil)	MF	16 July 1986 (aged 25)	Rockford Rampage	2010		17	1
18	Jeff Cosgriff	(United States)	MF	26 December 1987 (aged 23)	AC St. Louis	2011		24	2
23	Ryan Woods	(England)	MF	16 May 1988 (aged 23)	(Canada) Forest City London	2011		12	0
26	Ely Allen	(United States)	MF	12 June 1986 (aged 25)	D.C. United	2010		38	3
32	Lucas Rodríguez	(Argentina)	MF	8 February 1986 (aged 25)	Kansas City Brass	2010		36	5
77	Andy Lorei	(United States)	MF	25 March 1989 (aged 22)	Real Maryland	2011		8	0
Forwards
9	Tino Nuñez	(United States)	FW	22 August 1984 (aged 27)	Rochester Rhinos	2011		15	0
19	Simone Bracalello	(Italy)	FW	21 October 1985 (aged 26)		2010		52	12
20	Brian Cvilikas	(United States)	FW	16 March 1984 (aged 27)	Minnesota Thunder	2010		41	8
21	Devin Del Do	(United States)	FW	21 May 1986 (aged 25)		2010		38	7
22	Amani Walker	(Jamaica)	FW	16 December 1989 (aged 21)	Orange County Blue Star	2011		19	1
25	Anthony Hamilton	(United States)	FW	26 August 1985 (aged 26)	Rochester Rhinos	2011		6	0
28	Luke Mulholland	(England)	FW	7 August 1988 (aged 23)	Wilmington Hammerheads	2011		9	2
Players away on loan
5	Jack Stewart	(United States)	DF	29 May 1983 (aged 28)	Carolina RailHawks	2011		15	0
Players who left during the season
24	Scott Lorenz	(United States)	DF	23 July 1987 (aged 24)	Loan from Sporting Kansas City	2011		8	0

=== Staff ===
- Head coach (United States) Manny Lagos
- Assistant coach (England) Carl Craig
- Player Coach (United States) Kevin Friedland
- Head Athletic Trainer Jeremy Donner

== Transfers ==
=== Winter ===
In: Note: Flags indicate national team as defined under FIFA eligibility rules; some limited exceptions apply. Players may hold more than one non-FIFA nationality.

No.	Pos.	Nation	Player
2	DF	USA	Justin Davis (from (United States) New Mexico Lobos)
3	DF	BRA	Cristiano (from (United States) Miami)
5	DF	USA	Jack Stewart
9	FW	USA	Tino Nuñez (from (United States) Rochester Rhinos)
10	MF	LBR	Sandy Gbandi (from (United States) Puerto Rico Islanders)
15	DF	USA	John Gilkerson (from (United States) Carolina RailHawks)
18	MF	USA	Jeff Cosgriff (from (United States) AC St. Louis)
22	FW	JAM	Amani Walker (from (United States) Orange County Blue Star)
23	MF	ENG	Ryan Woods (from (Canada) Forest City London)
77	MF	USA	Andy Lorei (from (United States) Real Maryland)

Out: Note: Flags indicate national team as defined under FIFA eligibility rules; some limited exceptions apply. Players may hold more than one non-FIFA nationality.

No.	Pos.	Nation	Player
2	DF	NOR	Thomas Granum
3	DF	CAN	Andres Arango (to (United States) Tampa Bay Rowdies)
9	MF	USA	Warren Ukah (to (United States) Tampa Bay Rowdies)
10	MF	LBR	Johnny Menyongar (to (India) United Sikkim)
12	MF	USA	Leland Wright (to (Germany) Sportfreunde Siegen)
18	FW	LBR	Melvin Tarley
25	DF	USA	Scott Lorenz (to (United States) Sporting Kansas City)
27	GK	LBR	Louis Crayton
28	DF	USA	Max Lipset

=== Summer ===
In: Note: Flags indicate national team as defined under FIFA eligibility rules; some limited exceptions apply. Players may hold more than one non-FIFA nationality.

No.	Pos.	Nation	Player
24	DF	USA	Scott Lorenz (loan from (United States) Sporting Kansas City)
25	FW	USA	Anthony Hamilton (from (United States) Rochester Rhinos)
28	FW	ENG	Luke Mulholland (from (United States) Wilmington Hammerheads)

Out: Note: Flags indicate national team as defined under FIFA eligibility rules; some limited exceptions apply. Players may hold more than one non-FIFA nationality.

No.	Pos.	Nation	Player
5	DF	USA	Jack Stewart (loan to (United States) Dallas)
24	DF	USA	Scott Lorenz (loan return to (United States) Sporting Kansas City)

== Competitions ==
=== NASL ===
==== Standings ====
Pos	Team	Pld	W	D	L	GF	GA	GD	Pts	Qualification
4	Fort Lauderdale Strikers	28	9	11	8	35	36	−1	38	Playoff quarterfinals
5	FC Edmonton	28	10	6	12	35	40	−5	36 (Note: EDM: 8 pts; MIN: 2 pts)	Playoff quarterfinals
6	NSC Minnesota Stars (C)	28	9	9	10	30	32	−2	36	Playoff quarterfinals
7	Montreal Impact	28	9	8	11	35	27	+8	35	
8	Atlanta Silverbacks	28	4	4	20	25	63	−38	16	

Source: NASL Standings
Rules for classification: 1) points; 2) head-to-head record; 3) goal difference; 4) number of goals scored.
(C) Champions

==== Results summary ====
Overall								Home						Away					
Pld	W	D	L	GF	GA	GD	Pts	W	D	L	GF	GA	GD	W	D	L	GF	GA	GD
28	9	9	10	30	32	−2	36	5	5	4	14	10	+4	4	4	6	16	22	−6

Last updated: September 24, 2011.
Source: Match reports

==== Results by round ====
Round	1	2	3	4	5	6	7	8	9	10	11	12	13	14	15	16	17	18	19	20	21	22	23	24	25	26	27	28
Stadium	A	A	A	H	H	H	H																					
Result	W	D	L	D	D	W	W																					
Position																												

Source: Match reports
A = Away; H = Home; W = Win; D = Draw; L = Loss

==== Matches ====
April 9, 2011 1	Atlanta Silverbacks	1–2	Minnesota Stars	Atlanta
19:05 CDT (UTC−5)	Horth (yellow card) 30' (goal) 64'; Pérez (yellow card) 90'	Summary	Del Do (yellow card) 54'; Takada 57'; Clements (yellow card) 69'; Gotsmanov 90'	Stadium: Atlanta Silverbacks Park; Referee: Jose Rivero

April 15, 2011 2	Fort Lauderdale Strikers	1–1	Minnesota Stars	Fort Lauderdale
19:30 CDT (UTC−5)	Wheeler (yellow card) 30'; Coudet (yellow card) 48' (goal) 90' (pen.); Arguez (yellow card) 90'	Summary	Stewart (yellow card) 21'; Altman (yellow card) 53'; Allen (yellow card) 56'; Del Do 60'; Gilkerson (yellow card) 79'	Stadium: Lockhart Stadium

April 26, 2011 3	Puerto Rico Islanders	3–1	Minnesota Stars	Bayamón Puerto Rico
19:05 CDT (UTC−5)	Addlery 34'; Faña 39', 77'; Salem (yellow card) 71'	Summary	Rodríguez (yellow card) 19'; Altman 21'; Gotsmanov (yellow card) 48'	Stadium: Juan Ramón Loubriel Stadium

April 30, 2011 4	Minnesota Stars	1–1	Carolina RailHawks	Blaine
19:30 CDT (UTC−5)	Altman (yellow card) 56'; Bracalello 66'; Hlavaty (yellow card) 84'	Summary	Barbara 59' (pen.); Campos (yellow card) 59' (yellow-red card) 81'	Stadium: National Sports Center

May 7, 2011 5	Minnesota Stars	1–1	Fort Lauderdale Strikers	Blaine
19:30 CDT (UTC−5)	Bracalello (yellow card) 27' (yellow-red card) 90' (goal) 88'; Stewart (yellow card) 35'; Hlavaty (yellow card) 89'	Summary	Coudet 35' (pen.); Arguez (yellow card) 58'	Stadium: National Sports Center

May 14, 2011 6	Minnesota Stars	3–0	Atlanta Silverbacks	Blaine
19:30 CDT (UTC−5)	Cosgriff 18'; Hlavaty 57' (pen.); Rodríguez 66'	Summary	Pérez (yellow card) 54'; Schnorf (yellow card) 59'; Quintero (yellow card) 69'; Paulini (yellow card) 78'	Stadium: National Sports Center

May 18, 2011 7	Minnesota Stars	2–0	Puerto Rico Islanders	Blaine
18:30 CDT (UTC−5)	Davis 62'; Del Do 73'	Summary	Cunningham (yellow card) 65'; Salem (yellow card) 85'; Foley (yellow card) 90+2'	Stadium: National Sports Center

May 23, 2011 8	Edmonton	2–1	Minnesota Stars	Edmonton
20:30 CDT (UTC−5)	Porter 26', 65'; Matthijs (yellow card) 45'; Saiko (yellow card) 69'	Summary	Bracalello 24'	Stadium: Foote Field

May 28, 2011 9	Minnesota Stars	0–0	Tampa Bay Rowdies	Blaine
19:30 CDT (UTC−5)		Summary	Ambersley (yellow card) 31'; Hayes (yellow card) 43'	Stadium: National Sports Center

June 1, 2011 10	Puerto Rico Islanders	1–1	Minnesota Stars	Bayamón Puerto Rico
19:05 CDT (UTC−5)	Addlery 38'; Pitchkolan (yellow card) 79'; Foley (yellow card) 87'	Summary	Rodríguez (yellow card) 32'; Altman (yellow card) 45'; Cosgriff (yellow card) 64'; Bracalello 70'; Cristiano (yellow card) 88'	Stadium: Juan Ramón Loubriel Stadium

June 4, 2011 11	Atlanta Silverbacks	0–2	Minnesota Stars	Atlanta
18:30 CDT (UTC−5)	Schnorf (yellow card) 53'; Quintero (yellow card) 86'	Summary	Del Do 3', 64'; Rodríguez (yellow card) 38'; Woods (yellow card) 62'	Stadium: Atlanta Silverbacks Park

June 11, 2011 12	Fort Lauderdale Strikers	3–0	Minnesota Stars	Fort Lauderdale
18:30 CDT (UTC−5)	Coudet (yellow card) 38' Granado 55'; Shriver 65', 87'; Laing (red card) 77'	Summary	Allen (yellow card) 17'; Davis (yellow card) 49'; Cristiano (yellow card) 62'	Stadium: Lockhart Stadium

June 18, 2011 13	Minnesota Stars	1–1	Edmonton	Blaine
19:30 CDT (UTC−5)	Stewart (yellow card) 53'; Hlavaty 56' (pen.) (yellow card) 64'; Davis (yellow card) 62'; Kallman (yellow card) 90'	Summary	Saiko 14' (yellow card) 19' (yellow-red card) 86'; Antoniuk (yellow card) 36'; Surprenant (yellow card) 63'	Stadium: National Sports Center

July 4, 2011 14	Minnesota Stars	1–1	Edmonton	Blaine
19:30 CDT (UTC−5)	Stewart (yellow card) 47'; Del Do 85'	Summary	Rago (yellow card) 57'; Surprenant 63'; Lemire (yellow card) 85'	Stadium: National Sports Center

July 9, 2011 15	Minnesota Stars	1–0	Carolina RailHawks	Blaine
19:30 CDT (UTC−5)	Takada (yellow card) 68'; Walker 90+3'	Summary	Campos (yellow card) 5'; Nurse (yellow card) 45+2' (yellow-red card) 84'; Barbara (yellow card) 71'	Stadium: National Sports Center

July 17, 2011 16	Minnesota Stars	0–1	Puerto Rico Islanders	Blaine
19:30 CDT (UTC−5)		Summary	van Schaik 76'	Stadium: National Sports Center

July 22, 2011 17	Minnesota Stars	1–0	Montreal Impact	Blaine
19:30 CDT (UTC−5)	Hlavaty 32' (pen.); Bracalello (yellow card) 47'; Altman (yellow card) 57'	Summary	Testo (yellow card) 27'; Camara (yellow card) 31'; Bush (yellow card) 32'; Westlake (yellow card) 51'; Gatti (yellow card) 72'; Lowery (yellow card) 77'	Stadium: National Sports Center

August 6, 2011 18	Montreal Impact	1–3	Minnesota Stars	Montreal
19:00 CDT (UTC−5)	Testo (yellow card) 16'; Westlake 22' (yellow card) 57'; Pizzolitto (yellow card) 65'; Gatti (yellow card) 67'	Summary	Clements (yellow card) 4'; Hlavaty 17' (pen.); Bracalello 75', 90+4'; Stewart (yellow card) 82'	Stadium: Saputo Stadium

August 10, 2011 19	Minnesota Stars	0–1	Fort Lauderdale Strikers	Blaine
19:30 CDT (UTC−5)	Hlavaty (yellow card) 27'; Cristiano (yellow card) 82'; Clements (yellow card) 89'	Summary	Palacio (yellow card) 62'; Nuñez 67'	Stadium: National Sports Center

August 13, 2011 20	Tampa Bay Rowdies	2–0	Minnesota Stars	St. Petersburg
18:00 CDT (UTC−5)	Millien 45'; Sanfilippo 67'; Ukah (yellow card) 77'; Yoshitake (yellow card) 83'	Summary	Cosgriff (yellow card) 62'	Stadium: Al Lang Stadium

August 17, 2011 21	Carolina RailHawks	1–1	Minnesota Stars	Cary
18:00 CDT (UTC−5)	Campos 48'; Miller (yellow card) 52'	Summary	Rodríguez 55'; Bracalello (yellow card) 80'	Stadium: WakeMed Soccer Park

August 20, 2011 22	Montreal Impact	2–0	Minnesota Stars	Montreal
13:30 CDT (UTC−5)	Lowery (yellow card) 35'; Pore 45'; Kreamalmeyer (yellow card) 75'; Sebrango 83'; Bush (yellow card) 83'	Summary		Stadium: Saputo Stadium

August 27, 2011 23	Minnesota Stars	0–2	Montreal Impact	Blaine
19:00 CDT (UTC−5)	Bracalello (yellow card) 49'; Davis (yellow card) 77'	Summary	Ubiparipović 5', 72'; Sebrango (yellow card) 37'	Stadium: National Sports Center

September 3, 2011 24	Edmonton	3–1	Minnesota Stars	Edmonton
20:30 CDT (UTC−5)	Yamada 56'; Saiko 69'; Antoniuk 90+2'	Summary	Altman (yellow card) 24'; Cvilikas 44'	Stadium: Foote Field

September 6, 2011 25	Minnesota Stars	1–2	Tampa Bay Rowdies	Blaine
19:30 CDT (UTC−5)	Kallman 51'; Takada (yellow card) 66'	Summary	Savage 22'; Gyorio 76'	Stadium: National Sports Center

September 10, 2011 26	Minnesota Stars	2–0	Atlanta Silverbacks	Blaine
19:30 CDT (UTC−5)	Cosgriff 12'; Kallman (yellow card) 15'; Takada (yellow card) 63'; Altman 84' (pen.)	Summary	Hunt (yellow card) 72'; O'Brien (yellow card) 80'	Stadium: National Sports Center

September 17, 2011 27	Tampa Bay Rowdies	1–1	Minnesota Stars	St. Petersburg
18:00 CDT (UTC−5)	King 59'; Ambersley (yellow card) 85'	Summary	Cvilikas 54'	Stadium: Al Lang Stadium

September 24, 2011 28	Carolina RailHawks	1–2	Minnesota Stars	Cary
18:00 CDT (UTC−5)	Zimmerman (yellow card) 30'; Campos 50'; Low (yellow card) 66'	Summary	Altman 48' (pen.); Cvilikas 52'; Cosgriff (yellow card) 81'	Stadium: WakeMed Soccer Park

=== NASL Playoffs ===
October 1, 2011 Quarterfinal	Tampa Bay	0–1	Minnesota Stars	St. Petersburg
18:30 CDT (UTC−5)	Arango (yellow card) 14'	Summary	Mulholland 27'; Cosgriff (yellow card) 50'; Altman (yellow card) 57'	Stadium: Al Lang Stadium; Attendance: 3,003

October 8, 2011 Semifinal 1st leg	Minnesota Stars	1–0	Carolina RailHawks	Blaine
19:30 CDT (UTC−5)	Cvilikas (yellow card) 38'; Gotsmanov (yellow card) 56' (goal) 90'; Mulholland (yellow card) 76'	Summary	McKenney (yellow card) 45'; Campos (yellow card) 67'; McManus (yellow card) 76'	Stadium: National Sports Center; Attendance: 2,512

October 15, 2011 Semifinal 2nd leg	Carolina RailHawks	4–3 (a.e.t.) (4–4 agg.) (3–5 p)	Minnesota Stars	Cary
18:00 CDT (UTC−5)	Campos 45', 61' (pen.), 90+5' (yellow card) 45+2'; Steele (yellow card) 57'; Zimmerman 64'; McKenney (red card) 66'; Franks (yellow card) 85'; Nurse (yellow card) 103'	Summary	Kallman (yellow card) 7'; Gotsmanov (yellow card) 10' (goal) 40'; Cvilikas (yellow card) 36'; Altman (yellow card) 47'; Rodríguez 52'; Hlavaty 67' (pen.); Davis (yellow card) 120+4'	Stadium: WakeMed Soccer Park; Attendance: 4,002
	Penalties
	Steele (penalty missed); Barbara (penalty scored); Low (penalty scored); Knighton (penalty scored)		(penalty scored) Hlavaty; (penalty scored) Del Do; (penalty scored) Altman; (penalty scored) Bracalello; (penalty scored) Rodríguez

==== Soccer Bowl ====
October 22, 2011 1st leg	Minnesota Stars	3–1	Fort Lauderdale Strikers	Blaine
19:30 CDT (UTC−5)	Hlavaty 4' (pen.); Mulholland 53'; Rodríguez 77'	Summary	Gordon (yellow card) 35'; Ståhl (yellow card) 40'; Davis 52' (o.g.)	Stadium: National Sports Center; Attendance: 4,511

October 29, 2011 2nd leg	Fort Lauderdale Strikers	0–0 (1–3 agg.)	Minnesota Stars	Fort Lauderdale
18:30 CDT (UTC−5)	Mayen (yellow card) 90'	Summary		Stadium: Lockhart Stadium; Attendance: 6,849

=== U.S. Open Cup ===
The Minnesota Stars were denied entry in to the 2011 U.S. Open Cup.

== Squad statistics ==
As of Match played October 29, 2011

=== Appearances and goals ===
No.	Pos	Nat	Player	Total		NASL		NASL Playoffs	
No.	Pos	Nat	Player	Apps	Goals	Apps	Goals	Apps	Goals
1	GK	(United States) USA	Joe Warren	32	0	27	0	5	0
2	DF	(United States) USA	Justin Davis	27	1	22	1	5	0
3	DF	(Brazil) BRA	Cristiano	23	0	17+1	0	5	0
4	MF	(United States) USA	Neil Hlavaty	29	6	21+3	4	4+1	2
6	DF	(United States) USA	Kevin Friedland	2	0	0+2	0	0	0
7	MF	(Belarus) BLR	Andrei Gotsmanov	27	3	19+3	1	5	2
9	FW	(United States) USA	Tino Nuñez	15	0	8+7	0	0	0
10	MF	(Liberia) LBR	Sandy Gbandi	5	0	2+3	0	0	0
11	DF	(United States) USA	Chris Clements	17	0	17	0	0	0
13	MF	(Japan) JPN	Kentaro Takada	21	1	15+2	1	1+3	0
14	DF	(United States) USA	Brian Kallman	15	1	8+2	1	5	0
15	DF	(United States) USA	John Gilkerson	6	0	5+1	0	0	0
16	DF	(United States) USA	Kyle Altman	32	3	27	3	5	0
17	MF	(Brazil) BRA	Geison Moura	4	0	1+3	0	0	0
18	MF	(United States) USA	Jeff Cosgriff	23	2	15+3	2	5	0
19	FW	(Italy) ITA	Simone Bracalello	22	6	15+4	6	0+3	0
20	FW	(United States) USA	Brian Cvilikas	13	3	5+3	3	5	0
21	FW	(United States) USA	Devin Del Do	29	5	15+10	5	0+4	0
22	FW	(Jamaica) JAM	Amani Walker	19	1	2+17	1	0	0
23	MF	(England) ENG	Ryan Woods	12	0	5+7	0	0	0
25	FW	(United States) USA	Anthony Hamilton	6	0	2+2	0	0+2	0
26	MF	(United States) USA	Ely Allen	11	0	11	0	0	0
28	FW	(England) ENG	Luke Mulholland	9	2	4	0	5	2
30	GK	(United States) USA	Matt Van Oekel	1	0	1	0	0	0
32	MF	(Argentina) ARG	Lucas Rodríguez	26	4	20+1	2	5	2
77	MF	(United States) USA	Andy Lorei	4	0	1+3	0	0	0
Players away from Minnesota Stars on loan:
5	DF	(United States) USA	Jack Stewart	15	0	15	0	0	0
Players who left Minnesota Stars during the season:
24	DF	(United States) USA	Scott Lorenz	8	0	8	0	0	0

=== Goal scorers ===
Place	Position	Nation	Number	Name	NASL	NASL Playoffs	Total
1	FW	(Italy)	19	Simone Bracalello	6	0	6
1	MF	(United States)	4	Neil Hlavaty	4	2	6
3	FW	(United States)	21	Devin Del Do	5	0	5
4	MF	(Argentina)	32	Lucas Rodríguez	2	2	4
5	DF	(United States)	16	Kyle Altman	3	0	3
5	FW	(United States)	20	Brian Cvilikas	3	0	3
5	MF	(Belarus)	7	Andrei Gotsmanov	1	2	3
8	MF	(United States)	18	Jeff Cosgriff	2	0	2
8	FW	(England)	28	Luke Mulholland	0	2	2
10	MF	(Japan)	13	Kentaro Takada	1	0	1
10	DF	(United States)	2	Justin Davis	1	0	1
10	FW	(Jamaica)	22	Amani Walker	1	0	1
10	DF	(United States)	14	Brian Kallman	1	0	1
TOTALS					30	8	38

=== Disciplinary record ===
Number	Nation	Position	Name	NASL		NASL Playoffs		Total	
Number	Nation	Position	Name	Yellow card	Red card	Yellow card	Red card	Yellow card	Red card
2	(United States)	DF	Justin Davis	3	0	1	0	4	0
3	(Brazil)	DF	Cristiano	3	0	0	0	3	0
4	(United States)	MF	Neil Hlavaty	4	0	0	0	4	0
5	(United States)	DF	Jack Stewart	5	0	0	0	5	0
7	(Belarus)	MF	Andrei Gotsmanov	1	0	2	0	3	0
11	(United States)	DF	Chris Clements	3	0	0	0	3	0
13	(Japan)	MF	Kentaro Takada	3	0	0	0	3	0
14	(United States)	DF	Brian Kallman	2	0	1	0	3	0
15	(United States)	DF	John Gilkerson	1	0	0	0	1	0
16	(United States)	DF	Kyle Altman	5	0	1	0	6	0
18	(United States)	MF	Jeff Cosgriff	3	0	1	0	4	0
19	(Italy)	FW	Simone Bracalello	5	1	0	0	5	1
20	(United States)	FW	Brian Cvilikas	0	0	2	0	2	0
21	(United States)	FW	Devin Del Do	1	0	0	0	1	0
23	(England)	MF	Ryan Woods	1	0	0	0	1	0
26	(United States)	MF	Ely Allen	2	0	0	0	2	0
28	(England)	FW	Luke Mulholland	0	0	1	0	1	0
32	(Argentina)	MF	Lucas Rodríguez	3	0	0	0	3	0
			TOTALS	45	1	10	0	55	1
