= 2010 NSC Minnesota Stars season =

NSC Minnesota Stars
2010 season
- Owner: Paul Erickson (NSC)
- Head coach: Manny Lagos
- USSF Division 2: 7th (4th in Conference)
- U.S. Open Cup: Second Round
- Top goalscorer: League: Two Players (5); All: Simone Bracalello (6)
- Highest home attendance: 2,310
- Lowest home attendance: 588
- Average home league attendance: 1,374
Home colours	Away colours

The 2010 NSC Minnesota Stars season was the first season of the franchise to be played in the USSF Division 2 Pro League.

== Roster ==
As of match played October 9, 2010

No.	Name	Nationality	Position	Date of birth (age)	Signed from	Signed in	Contract ends	Apps.	Goals
Goalkeepers
1	Joe Warren	(United States)	GK	20 October 1974 (aged 35)		2010		28	0
27	Louis Crayton	(Liberia)	GK	26 October 1977 (aged 32)	D.C. United	2010		1	0
30	Matt Van Oekel	(United States)	GK	20 September 1986 (aged 24)	Minnesota Thunder	2010		7	0
Defenders
2	Thomas Granum	(Norway)	DF	31 December 1989 (aged 20)	Strømsgodset	2010		3	0
3	Andres Arango	(Canada)	DF	23 April 1983 (aged 27)	Minnesota Thunder	2010		31	1
6	Kevin Friedland	(United States)	DF	3 October 1981 (aged 29)	Minnesota Thunder	2010		23	0
8	Daniel Wasson	(United States)	DF	15 June 1984 (aged 26)	VfL Osnabrück	2010		31	2
11	Chris Clements	(United States)	DF	2 March 1987 (aged 23)	Minnesota Thunder	2010		26	0
14	Brian Kallman	(United States)	DF	23 April 1984 (aged 26)	Minnesota Thunder	2010		17	0
16	Kyle Altman	(United States)	DF	31 January 1986 (aged 24)	Minnesota Thunder	2010		0	0
25	Scott Lorenz	(United States)	DF	23 July 1987 (aged 23)	Chicago Fire NPSL	2010		23	0
28	Max Lipset	(United States)	DF			2010		1	0
Midfielders
4	Neil Hlavaty	(United States)	MF	23 July 1986 (aged 24)	Jagiellonia Białystok	2010		24	4
7	Andrei Gotsmanov	(Belarus)	MF	6 May 1986 (aged 24)	Minnesota Thunder	2010		18	0
10	Johnny Menyongar	(Liberia)	MF	26 June 1980 (aged 30)	Rochester Rhinos	2010		21	1
12	Leland Wright	(United States)	MF	29 October 1986 (aged 23)	San Diego Toreros	2010		6	0
13	Kentaro Takada	(Japan)	MF	13 April 1983 (aged 27)	Rochester Thunder	2010		21	1
23	Lucas Rodríguez	(Argentina)	MF	8 February 1986 (aged 24)	MidAmerica Nazarene Pioneers	2010		10	1
26	Ely Allen	(United States)	MF	12 June 1986 (aged 24)	D.C. United	2010		27	3
Forwards
9	Warren Ukah	(United States)	FW	22 March 1985 (aged 25)	Rochester Rhinos	2010		20	3
15	Devin Del Do	(United States)	FW	21 May 1986 (aged 24)	Cal State Northridge Matadors	2010		9	2
17	Geison Moura	(Brazil)	FW	16 July 1986 (aged 24)	Rockford Rampage	2010		13	1
18	Melvin Tarley	(Liberia)	FW	31 October 1982 (aged 27)	Minnesota Thunder	2010		25	3
19	Simone Bracalello	(Italy)	FW	21 October 1985 (aged 24)		2010		30	6
20	Brian Cvilikas	(United States)	FW	16 March 1984 (aged 26)	Minnesota Thunder	2010		28	5
Left Minnesota Stars During the Season
21	Gao Leilei	(China)	MF	15 July 1980 (aged 30)	KooTeePee	2010		11	1
22	Two-Boys Gumede	(South Africa)	FW	23 August 1985 (aged 25)	UAB Blazers	2010		8	0

== Transfers ==
=== In ===
Date	Position	Nationality	Name	From	Fee	Ref.
February 12, 2010	MF	(Liberia)	Johnny Menyongar	Rochester Rhinos		
February 17, 2010	MF	(Belarus)	Andrei Gotsmanov	Minnesota Thunder		
February 19, 2010	FW	(United States)	Brian Cvilikas	Minnesota Thunder		
February 25, 2010	DF	(Canada)	Andres Arango	Minnesota Thunder		
February 25, 2010	DF	(United States)	Chris Clements	(Germany) VfL Osnabrück		
February 25, 2010	MF	(United States)	Neil Hlavaty	(Poland) Jagiellonia Białystok		
March 4, 2010	DF	(United States)	Kyle Altman	Minnesota Thunder		
March 16, 2010	GK	(United States)	Joe Warren			
March 16, 2010	GK	(Liberia)	Louis Crayton	D.C. United		
March 16, 2010	FW	(Italy)	Simone Bracalello			
March 22, 2010	MF	(China)	Gao Leilei	(Finland) KooTeePee		
March 22, 2010	FW	(United States)	Warren Ukah	Rochester Rhinos		
March 22, 2010	FW	(Liberia)	Melvin Tarley	Minnesota Thunder		
March 22, 2010	FW	(South Africa)	Two-Boys Gumede	UAB Blazers		
March 31, 2010	DF	(United States)	Daniel Wasson	(Germany) VfL Osnabrück		
March 31, 2010	MF	(United States)	Ely Allen	D.C. United		
April 28, 2010	DF	(Norway)	Thomas Granum	(Norway) Strømsgodset		
May 25, 2010	MF	(Argentina)	Lucas Rodríguez	MidAmerica Nazarene Pioneers		
May 25, 2010	FW	(Brazil)	Geison Moura	Rockford Rampage		
2010	GK	(United States)	Matt Van Oekel	Minnesota Thunder		
2010	DF	(United States)	Kevin Friedland	Minnesota Thunder		
2010	DF	(United States)	Brian Kallman	Minnesota Thunder		
2010	DF	(United States)	Scott Lorenz	Chicago Fire NPSL		
2010	MF	(United States)	Leland Wright	San Diego Toreros		
2010	MF	(Japan)	Kentaro Takada	Rochester Thunder		
2010	FW	(United States)	Devin Del Do	Cal State Northridge Matadors		

=== Released ===
Date	Position	Nationality	Name	Joined	Date
June 29, 2010	MF	(China)	Gao Leilei	(China) Beijing Baxy	
2010	FW	(South Africa)	Two-Boys Gumede		

== Friendlies ==
July 2, 2010	Rochester Thunder	1–2	NSC Minnesota Stars	Rochester
CDT (UTC−5)	65'		Cvilikas 25'; Takada 73'	Stadium: RCTC Stadium

July 16, 2010	NSC Minnesota Stars	2–1	Rochester Thunder	Blaine
CDT (UTC−5)	Bracalello 52'; Hlavaty 78'	Summary	Otira 54'	Stadium: National Sports Center

== Competitions ==
=== USSF Division 2 ===
==== Standings ====
USL Conference
Pos	Team	Pld	W	L	T	GF	GA	GD	Pts	Qualification
1	Rochester Rhinos	30	16	8	6	38	24	+14	54	Conference leader, qualified for playoffs
2	Austin Aztex	30	15	7	8	53	40	+13	53	Qualified for playoffs (Note: The remaining six teams with the highest point totals, regardless of conference, also advance to the playoffs.)
3	Portland Timbers	30	13	7	10	34	23	+11	49	Qualified for playoffs
4	NSC Minnesota Stars	30	11	12	7	32	36	−4	40	Qualified for playoffs
5	Puerto Rico Islanders	30	9	11	10	37	35	+2	37	Qualified for playoffs
6	FC Tampa Bay	30	7	12	11	41	46	−5	32	

Source: USSF D-2 schedule table

==== Results summary ====
Overall								Home						Away					
Pld	W	D	L	GF	GA	GD	Pts	W	D	L	GF	GA	GD	W	D	L	GF	GA	GD
30	11	7	12	32	36	−4	40	6	3	6	13	16	−3	5	4	6	19	20	−1

Last updated: May 24, 2016.
Source: Match reports

==== Results ====
April 11, 2010 1	Vancouver Whitecaps	2–0	NSC Minnesota Stars	Burnaby
19:00 CDT (UTC−5)	Orgill (yellow card) 16'; Tsiskaridze (yellow card) 43'; Bellisomo 62'; Knight (yellow card) 70'; James 76'	Summary	Gotsmanov (yellow card) 21'; Friedland (yellow card) 61'; Kallman (yellow card) 86'	Stadium: Swangard Stadium; Attendance: 4,934; Referee: Mathieu Bourdeau

April 16, 2010 2	Carolina RailHawks	0–1	NSC Minnesota Stars	Cary
19:00 CDT (UTC−5)		Summary	Wasson 37' (yellow card) 48'; Bracalello (yellow card) 70'	Stadium: WakeMed Soccer Park; Attendance: 1,694

April 18, 2010 3	Puerto Rico Islanders	3–1	NSC Minnesota Stars	Bayamón
20:05 CDT (UTC−5)	Foley 13'; Addlery 17'; Gbandi 51' (yellow card) 67'; Delgado (yellow card) 61'	Summary	Hlavaty 85'; Allen (yellow card) 90'	Stadium: Juan Ramón Loubriel Stadium; Attendance: 2,498

April 24, 2010 4	NSC Minnesota Stars	1–0	Tampa Bay Rowdies	Blaine
20:00 CDT (UTC−5)	Altman (yellow card) 16'; Kallman (red card) 32'; Leilei 34' (pen.) (yellow card) 86'; Arango (yellow card) 68'	Summary	Christie (yellow card) 28'; Kljestan (red card) 31'; Wheeler (yellow card) 56'; Yamada (yellow card) 72'	Stadium: National Sports Center; Attendance: 2,310

April 28, 2010 5	NSC Minnesota Stars	0–3	Rochester Rhinos	Blaine
20:00 CDT (UTC−5)	Arango (yellow card) 12'; Gotsmanov (yellow card) 87'	Summary	Costanzo 26' (yellow card) 89'; Nuñez 29', 53'	Stadium: National Sports Center; Attendance: 627

May 1, 2010 6	NSC Minnesota Stars	1–2	Austin Aztex	Blaine
20:00 CDT (UTC−5)	Cvilikas 36'; Wasson (red card) 44'; Tarley (yellow card) 72'	Summary	Campbell (yellow card) 23'; Johnson 75'; Worthen (red card) 80'; Watson 83'	Stadium: National Sports Center; Attendance: 753

May 8, 2010 7	Montreal Impact	2–1	NSC Minnesota Stars	Montreal
14:30 CDT (UTC−5)	Braz (yellow card) 45'; Placentino 79', 90' (yellow card) 90'	Summary	Altman (yellow card) 31'; Leilei (yellow card) 63'; Friedland (red card) 69'; Cvilikas 78'; Menyongar (yellow card) 82'	Stadium: Saputo Stadium; Attendance: 12,265; Referee: Mike Edmunds

May 15, 2010 8	NSC Minnesota Stars	1–1	Miami FC	Blaine
20:00 CDT (UTC−5)	Menyongar 56'; Gumede (yellow card) 75'; Clements (yellow card) 83'	Summary	Araujo Jr. 73'	Stadium: National Sports Center; Attendance: 1,576

May 22, 2010 9	Miami FC	1–0	NSC Minnesota Stars	Fort Lauderdale
19:30 CDT (UTC−5)	Araujo Jr. 71'	Summary		Stadium: Lockhart Stadium; Attendance: 1,793

May 27, 2010 10	Tampa Bay Rowdies	3–1	NSC Minnesota Stars	Tampa
19:30 CDT (UTC−5)	Kljestan 6'; Wheeler 20' (pen.) (yellow card) 31'; Tan 26'; Yamada (yellow card) 68'; Donoho (yellow card) 88'	Summary	Van Oekel (yellow card) 19'; Hlavaty 38'; Clements (yellow card) 63'; Ukah (yellow card) 76'; Friedland (yellow card) 90'	Stadium: George M. Steinbrenner Field; Attendance: 3,886

May 29, 2010 11	NSC Minnesota Stars	3–2	St. Louis	Blaine
20:00 CDT (UTC−5)	Wasson 41'; Altman 72'; Hlavaty 87'	Summary	Kreamalmeyer 25'; Gauchinho 69'; Cole (yellow card) 86'	Stadium: National Sports Center; Attendance: 1,562

June 4, 2010 12	Rochester Rhinos	0–0	NSC Minnesota Stars	Rochester
19:30 CDT (UTC−5)	Roberts (yellow card) 57'; Pitchkolan (yellow card) 90'	Summary	Altman (yellow card)	Stadium: Sahlen's Stadium; Attendance: 5,284

June 9, 2010 13	NSC Minnesota Stars	1–0	Montreal Impact	Blaine
20:00 CDT (UTC−5)	Cvilikas (yellow card) 57'; Altman (yellow card) 82'; Tarley 87'	Summary	Pizzolitto (yellow card) 37'; Billy (yellow card) 55'; DeRoux (yellow card) 89'	Stadium: National Sports Center; Attendance: 746

June 17, 2010 14	Portland Timbers	0–1	NSC Minnesota Stars	Portland
22:00 CDT (UTC−5)	Suzuki (yellow card) 8'; Joy (yellow card) 35'; Marcelin (red card) 52'	Summary	Allen 20'; Clements (yellow card) 43'; Cvilikas (yellow card) 60'; Friedland (yellow card) 78'	Stadium: PGE Park; Attendance: 8,877

June 19, 2010 15	NSC Minnesota Stars	0–2	Portland Timbers	Blaine
20:00 CDT (UTC−5)	Moura (yellow card) 43'	Summary	Pore 6' (pen.); McManus (yellow card) 14'; Danso (yellow card) 79'; Josten (yellow card) 87'; Cameron 89'	Stadium: National Sports Center; Attendance: 1,152

June 26, 2010 16	Crystal Palace Baltimore	1–3	NSC Minnesota Stars	Baltimore
17:00 CDT (UTC−5)	Yoshitake 50'; Robson (yellow card) 88'	Summary	Ukah 17'; Cvilikas 65' (yellow card) 90+3'; Wasson (yellow card) 71'; Arango 81'	Stadium: Paul Angelo Russo Stadium; Attendance: 2,348

July 4, 2010 17	NSC Minnesota Stars	0–1	Crystal Palace Baltimore	Blaine
20:30 CDT (UTC−5)	Arango (yellow card) 42'; Ukah (yellow card) 89'	Summary	Patterson (yellow card) 18'; Pérez (yellow card) 37'; Marshall (yellow card) 56'; Teixeira (yellow card) 67'; Yoshitake 86'	Stadium: National Sports Center; Attendance: 2,136

July 10, 2010 18	NSC Minnesota Stars	1–0	Tampa Bay Rowdies	Blaine
20:10 CDT (UTC−5)	Valentino 28' (o.g.); Wasson (yellow card) 42'; Arango (yellow card) 65'; Lorenz (yellow card) 74'	Summary		Stadium: National Sports Center; Attendance: 1,803

July 14, 2010 19	NSC Minnesota Stars	2–2	St. Louis	Blaine
21:00 CDT (UTC−5)	Kallman (yellow card) 56'; Cvilikas 87'; Moura 90+1' (yellow card) 90+1'	Summary	Cosgriff 43'; Salvaggione (yellow card) 62' (goal) 64'	Stadium: National Sports Center; Attendance: 2,091

July 21, 2010 20	NSC Minnesota Stars	1–1	Puerto Rico Islanders	Blaine
20:00 CDT (UTC−5)	Tarley 24'; Altman (yellow card) 73'; Rodríguez (yellow card) 90+1'	Summary	Vélez (yellow card) 49'; Nurse 71'	Stadium: National Sports Center; Attendance: 872

July 25, 2010 21	Vancouver Whitecaps	1–1	NSC Minnesota Stars	Burnaby
22:00 CDT (UTC−5)	Nash 67'	Summary	Bracalello 28'	Stadium: Swangard Stadium; Attendance: 5,288

August 1, 2010 22	St. Louis	2–2	NSC Minnesota Stars	Fenton
CDT (UTC−5)	Kreamalmeyer 42', 86' (pen.)	Summary	Tarley 83'; Cvilikas 90'; Rodríguez (yellow card) 90'	Stadium: Anheuser-Busch Center; Attendance: 2,037

August 11, 2010 23	Portland Timbers	2–2	NSC Minnesota Stars	Portland
22:00 CDT (UTC−5)	Dike 44'; Pore 63' (pen.); Joy (red card) 64'	Summary	Allen 24'; Altman (yellow card) 38'; Tarley (yellow card) 60'; Friedland (yellow card) 68'; Bracalello 73'	Stadium: PGE Park; Attendance: 15,418

August 14, 2010 24	NSC Minnesota Stars	0–1	Vancouver Whitecaps	Blaine
19:00 CDT (UTC−5)		Summary	Nash 15'; Wagner (yellow card) 74'	Stadium: National Sports Center; Attendance: 1,010

August 21, 2010 25	NSC Minnesota Stars	0–1	Portland Timbers	Blaine
20:15 CDT (UTC−5)	Warren (red card) 66'; Tarley (yellow card)	Summary	Pore 68' (pen.); Dike (yellow card); Purdy (yellow card)	Stadium: National Sports Center; Attendance: 1,429

September 4, 2010 26	Austin Aztex	2–0	NSC Minnesota Stars	Austin
20:30 CDT (UTC−5)	Johnson 28', 80' (yellow card) 67'	Summary	Wasson (yellow card) 34'; Altman (yellow card) 83'; Hlavaty (red card) 90+3'	Stadium: House Park; Attendance: 3,744

September 11, 2010 27	St. Louis	0–3	NSC Minnesota Stars	Fenton
20:10 CDT (UTC−5)	Bloom (yellow card) 43'; Gauchinho (yellow card) 45'; Traynor (yellow card) 45'; Stisser (yellow card); Salvaggione (yellow card)	Summary	Bracalello 25', 45'; Allen 33'; Clements (yellow card) 40'; Wasson (yellow card) 53'	Stadium: Anheuser-Busch Center; Attendance: 2,344

September 16, 2010 28	NSC Minnesota Stars	1–0	Carolina RailHawks	Blaine
20:00 CDT (UTC−5)	Del Do 37'	Summary	McKenney (red card) 19'; Lowery (red card) 80'	Stadium: National Sports Center; Attendance: 588

September 19, 2010 29	NSC Minnesota Stars	1–0	Vancouver Whitecaps	Blaine
20:15 CDT (UTC−5)	Allen (yellow card) 29'; Clements (yellow card) 36'; Del Do 49'	Summary	Bellisomo (yellow card) 86'	Stadium: National Sports Center

September 25, 2010 30	Tampa Bay Rowdies	1–3	NSC Minnesota Stars	Tampa
19:30 CDT (UTC−5)	Galindo (yellow card) 60' (goal) 73'	Summary	Rodríguez 14'; Bracalello 39'; Takada 44'; Gotsmanov (yellow card) 50'	Stadium: George M. Steinbrenner Field; Attendance: 3,006

==== Playoffs ====
October 6, 2010 Quarterfinal 1st Leg	NSC Minnesota Stars	0–0	Carolina RailHawks	Blaine
20:00 CDT (UTC−5)		Summary	Low (yellow card) 61'	Stadium: National Sports Center; Attendance: 686

October 9, 2010 Quarterfinal 2nd Leg	Carolina RailHawks	4–0	NSC Minnesota Stars	Cary
19:00 CDT (UTC−5)	Heinemann (yellow card) 38'; Lowery (yellow card) 56' (goal) 84'; Paladini 64' (yellow card) 65'; Gardner 71'; Kallman 88' (o.g.)	Summary	Arango (yellow card) 38' (red card) 39'	Stadium: WakeMed Soccer Park; Attendance: 2,556

=== U.S. Open Cup ===
NSC Minnesota Stars entered the 2010 edition of the Open Cup at the First Round stage, defeating KC Athletics before being knocked out in the Second Round by AC St. Louis.

June 15, 2010 First round	NSC Minnesota Stars	4–2	KC Athletics	Blaine
20:00 CDT (UTC−5)	Ukah 35', 45'; Hlavaty (yellow card) 45' (goal) 75'; Bracalello 71'	Summary	Vermillion (yellow card) 27'; Hoffman 61'; Perkins 72'	Stadium: National Sports Center; Attendance: 376; Referee: Sam Trigui

June 22, 2010 Second round	NSC Minnesota Stars	0–1	St. Louis	Blaine
20:00 CDT (UTC−5)		Summary	Cole (yellow card) 5'; Ambersley (yellow card) 29' (goal) 35'; Stisser (yellow card) 62'	Stadium: National Sports Center; Attendance: 265; Referee: Elias Bazakos

== Squad statistics ==
As of match played October 9, 2010

=== Appearances and goals ===
No.	Pos	Nat	Player	Total		USL		Playoffs		U.S. Open Cup	
No.	Pos	Nat	Player	Apps	Goals	Apps	Goals	Apps	Goals	Apps	Goals
1	GK	(United States) USA	Joe Warren	28	0	24+1	0	2	0	1	0
2	DF	(Norway) NOR	Thomas Granum	3	0	0+2	0	0	0	0+1	0
3	DF	(Canada) CAN	Andres Arango	31	1	28	1	2	0	1	0
4	MF	(United States) USA	Neil Hlavaty	24	4	4+16	3	0+2	0	1+1	1
6	DF	(United States) USA	Kevin Friedland	23	0	19+3	0	0	0	1	0
7	MF	(Belarus) BLR	Andrei Gotsmanov	18	0	11+5	0	0+2	0	0	0
8	DF	(United States) USA	Daniel Wasson	31	2	28	2	2	0	1	0
9	FW	(United States) USA	Warren Ukah	20	3	10+9	1	0	0	1	2
10	MF	(Liberia) LBR	Johnny Menyongar	21	1	19+1	1	0	0	1	0
11	DF	(United States) USA	Chris Clements	26	0	17+5	0	2	0	2	0
12	MF	(United States) USA	Leland Wright	6	0	1+4	0	0	0	1	0
13	MF	(Japan) JPN	Kentaro Takada	21	1	18	1	2	0	1	0
14	DF	(United States) USA	Brian Kallman	17	0	12+3	0	0+1	0	1	0
15	FW	(United States) USA	Devin Del Do	9	2	6+1	2	2	0	0	0
16	DF	(United States) USA	Kyle Altman	32	1	29	1	2	0	1	0
17	FW	(Brazil) BRA	Geison Moura	13	1	7+4	1	0	0	1+1	0
18	FW	(Liberia) LBR	Melvin Tarley	25	3	17+6	3	0+1	0	1	0
19	FW	(Italy) ITA	Simone Bracalello	30	6	10+17	5	2	0	0+1	1
20	FW	(United States) USA	Brian Cvilikas	28	5	12+14	5	0+1	0	1	0
23	MF	(Argentina) ARG	Lucas Rodríguez	10	1	5+3	1	2	0	0	0
25	DF	(United States) USA	Scott Lorenz	23	0	16+3	0	2	0	1+1	0
26	MF	(United States) USA	Ely Allen	27	3	19+5	3	2	0	1	0
27	GK	(Liberia) LBR	Louis Crayton	1	0	1	0	0	0	0	0
28	DF	(United States) USA	Max Lipset	1	0	0	0	0	0	1	0
30	GK	(United States) USA	Matt Van Oekel	7	0	5+1	0	0	0	1	0
Players who left NSC Minnesota Stars during the season:
21	MF	(China) CHN	Gao Leilei	11	1	8+2	1	0	0	1	0
22	FW	(South Africa) RSA	Two-Boys Gumede	8	0	4+3	0	0	0	1	0

=== Goal scorers ===
Place	Position	Nation	Number	Name	USL	Playoffs	U.S. Open Cup	Total
1	FW	(Italy)	19	Simone Bracalello	5	0	1	6
2	FW	(United States)	20	Brian Cvilikas	5	0	0	5
3	MF	(United States)	4	Neil Hlavaty	3	0	1	4
4	FW	(Liberia)	18	Melvin Tarley	3	0	0	3
4	MF	(United States)	26	Ely Allen	3	0	0	3
4	FW	(United States)	9	Warren Ukah	1	0	2	3
7	DF	(United States)	8	Daniel Wasson	2	0	0	2
7	FW	(United States)	15	Devin Del Do	2	0	0	2
9	MF	(China)	21	Gao Leilei	1	0	0	1
9	FW	(Liberia)	10	Johnny Menyongar	1	0	0	1
9	DF	(United States)	16	Kyle Altman	1	0	0	1
9	DF	(Canada)	3	Andres Arango	1	0	0	1
9	FW	(Brazil)	17	Geison Moura	1	0	0	1
9	MF	(Argentina)	23	Lucas Rodríguez	1	0	0	1
9	MF	(Japan)	13	Kentaro Takada	1	0	0	1
9				Own goal	1	0	0	1
TOTALS					32	0	4	36

=== Disciplinary record ===
Number	Nation	Position	Name	USL		Playoffs		U.S. Open Cup		Total	
Number	Nation	Position	Name	Yellow card	Red card	Yellow card	Red card	Yellow card	Red card	Yellow card	Red card
1	(United States)	GK	Joe Warren	0	1	0	0	0	0	0	1
3	(Canada)	DF	Andres Arango	4	0	1	1	0	0	1	1
4	(United States)	MF	Neil Hlavaty	0	1	0	0	1	0	1	0
6	(United States)	DF	Kevin Friedland	4	1	0	0	0	0	1	0
7	(Belarus)	MF	Andrei Gotsmanov	3	0	0	0	0	0	1	0
8	(United States)	DF	Daniel Wasson	5	1	0	0	0	0	1	0
9	(United States)	FW	Warren Ukah	2	0	0	0	0	0	1	0
10	(Liberia)	MF	Johnny Menyongar	1	0	0	0	0	0	1	0
11	(United States)	DF	Chris Clements	5	0	0	0	0	0	1	0
14	(United States)	DF	Brian Kallman	2	1	0	0	0	0	1	0
16	(United States)	DF	Kyle Altman	7	0	0	0	0	0	1	0
17	(Brazil)	FW	Geison Moura	2	0	0	0	0	0	1	0
18	(Liberia)	FW	Melvin Tarley	3	0	0	0	0	0	1	0
19	(Italy)	FW	Simone Bracalello	1	0	0	0	0	0	1	0
20	(United States)	FW	Brian Cvilikas	3	0	0	0	0	0	1	0
21	(China)	MF	Gao Leilei	2	0	0	0	0	0	1	0
22	(South Africa)	FW	Two-Boys Gumede	1	0	0	0	0	0	1	0
23	(Argentina)	MF	Lucas Rodríguez	2	0	0	0	0	0	1	0
25	(United States)	DF	Scott Lorenz	1	0	0	0	0	0	1	0
26	(United States)	MF	Ely Allen	2	0	0	0	0	0	1	0
30	(United States)	Gk	Matt Van Oekel	1	0	0	0	0	0	1	0
			TOTALS	51	5	1	1	1	0	53	6
