= Ryan Woods (footballer, born 1988) =

English footballer

Personal information
- Date of birth: 16 May 1988 (age 38)
- Place of birth: Preston, England
- Height: 5 ft 7 in (1.70 m)
- Position: Midfielder

Team information
- Current team: Carshalton Athletic

Youth career
- 1995–2007: Blackburn Rovers
- 2007–2010: Embry-Riddle Eagles

Senior career*
Years	Team	Apps	(Gls)
2010	Forest City London	16	(2)
2011	NSC Minnesota Stars	12	(0)
2012–	Carshalton Athletic		
- * Club domestic league appearances and goals as of 4 February 2012

Ryan Woods (born 16 May 1988) is an English footballer who plays for Carshalton Athletic.

== Career ==
=== College and amateur ===
Woods attended Queen Elizabeth's Grammar School in Blackburn, and was part of the youth setup of English Premier League team Blackburn Rovers, for whom he started playing when he was just seven years old.

Woods moved to the United States in 2007 after accepting a scholarship to attend and play college soccer at Embry–Riddle Aeronautical University in Daytona Beach, Florida. He was a two-time all American at Embry Riddle, was his team's captain for three seasons, and as a Junior in 2009 he was a first team All-American, a first team Sun Conference All-Conference selection, and an Academic Sun Conference All-Conference honoree. He finished his college career with 23 goals and 19 assists in 55 career games.

During his college years Woods also played with Forest City London in the USL Premier Development League, scoring two goals in 16 games in the 2010 season.

=== Professional ===
Woods began his professional career in 2011 when he was signed by the NSC Minnesota Stars of the North American Soccer League after attending the team's preseason training camp. He made his professional debut on 30 April 2011, coming on as a substitute in a 1–1 draw with the Carolina RailHawks.

=== Return to England ===
He returned to England to work as a recruitment consultant in London and in January 2012 signed for Carshalton Athletic.
