= 2005 Maccabiah Games =

17th edition of Jewish multi-sport event

17th Maccabiah
- The Moment to Love
- Host city: Tel Aviv, Israel
- Nations: 55
- Debuting countries: Cyprus; Macedonia; Luxembourg
- Athletes: 7,700
- Events: 100
- Opening: July 11, 2005
- Closing: July 21, 2005
- Torchbearer: Gal Fridman
- Main venue: Ramat Gan Stadium

The 17th Maccabiah Games (Hebrew: המכביה ה-17 ישראל תשס"ה), held in Israel, were an incarnation of the 'Jewish Olympics.' They attracted the largest attendance of any Maccabiah Games, including more than 900 representatives from the United States, almost 500 from Australia, and more than 2,000 from Israel, bringing the total participants to more than 7,700 from 55 countries.

Israel ended the games at the top of the medal count with 228 gold medals. The United States was second with 71 gold medals, while Russia came in third with 15.

== History ==
The Maccabiah Games were first held in 1932. In 1961, they were declared a "Regional Sports Event" by, and under the auspices and supervision of, the International Olympic Committee. Among other Olympic and world champions, swimmer Mark Spitz won 10 Maccabiah gold medals before earning his first of nine Olympic gold medals.

== Notable competitors ==
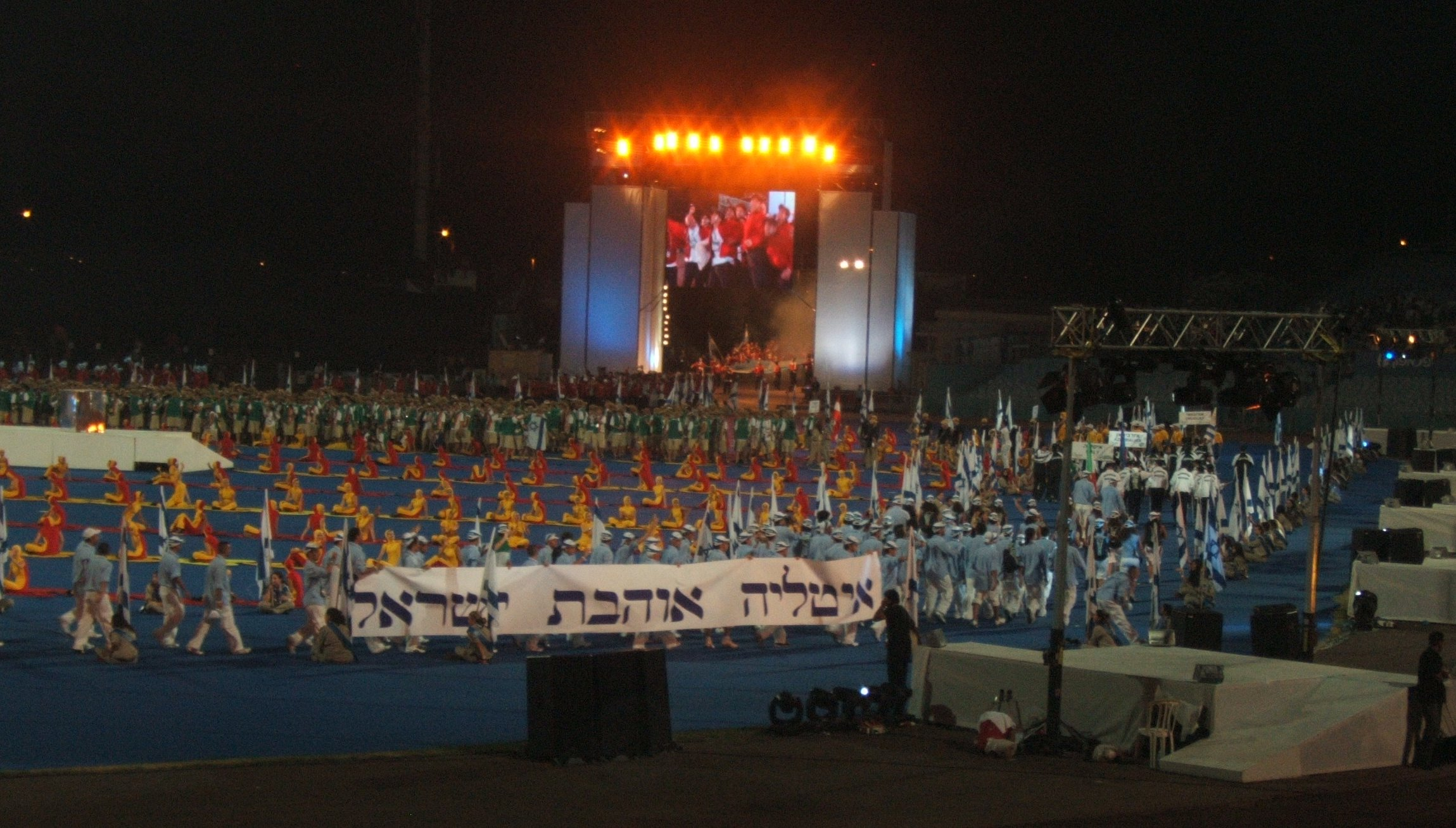
Opening ceremony of the 17th Maccabiah Games

In fencing, Vadim Gutzeit of Ukraine, an Olympic gold medal winner in team sabre, won gold medals in individual and team sabre. Two-time Olympic gold medal winner Sergey Sharikov of Russia won the silver medal in sabre. Two-time Pan American Games gold medalist Dan Kellner won the silver medal in foil for the US, as he was defeated by Israel's Tomer Or. Soren Thompson, former US Junior Champion, NCAA Fencing Champion, and future team world epee champion, won a team silver medal in epee for the US.

In swimming, American Olympic champion Scott Goldblatt won gold medals in the 4x100 freestyle relay and the 4x200 freestyle relay, a silver medal in the 200m freestyle, and a bronze medal in the 100m freestyle. American Daniel Madwed won a gold medal and set a new Maccabiah Games record in the men's 200-meter butterfly. Israeli Yoav Gath won gold medals in both the 100 m and 200 m backstroke, setting a new Maccabiah record in the 200. Israeli Olympian Michael Halika won a gold medal in the 400 m medley, setting a Maccabiah record. Israeli Olympian Anna Gostomelsky won the women's 100m freestyle, and set a new Maccabiah record.

In women's tennis, Sharon Fichman of Canada—after defeating Israeli Julia Glushko in the semi-finals—won the gold medal at the age of 14, and also won a bronze medal in the women’s doubles, and a silver medal in mixed doubles.

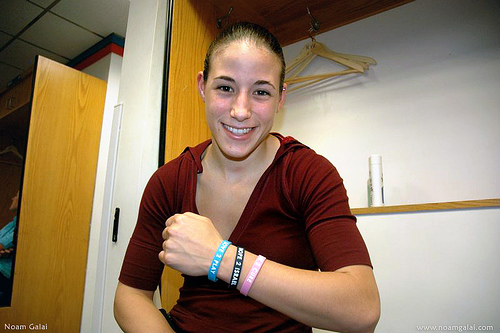
Shay Doron

In women's basketball, Shay Doron, who two years later signed with the WNBA New York Liberty, led the USA to a 5–0 record and a gold medal, and was selected Maccabiah MVP. In men's basketball, Guy Pnini (who was named tournament MVP) and Team Israel won a gold medal.

In squash, Brian L. Roberts, the Chairman and CEO of Comcast Corporation, won a gold medal with the US team in his fourth Maccabiah.

In soccer, Jonathan Bornstein, Benny Feilhaber, Leo Krupnik, Matt Reiswerg, Kyle Altman, Michael Erush, Jordan Gruber, and Kevin Friedland led the US men's open soccer to their best finish ever with a silver medal. The US lost to gold medal winner Israel, which played with their U-20 National Team, which included Itay Shechter, Yuval Spungin, and Shmuel Kozokin. Tomer Chencinski and Felix Gelt represented Canada in soccer. At age 18, Samuel Scheimann represented the Netherlands at the Games in football. At the age of 13, Nick Blackman competed in the Games as part of a British schools football team.

In karate, the US Men's open team took several gold and silver medals. The youth team took one silver and one bronze. In judo, 17-year-old Alice Schlesinger won a gold medal by defeating the world champion and former Israeli Daniella Krakower in the final. Canadian future Olympian Josh Binstock competed in volleyball.

Russian grandmaster and future European champion Evgeniy Najer won a gold medal in chess, as Israeli grandmaster Ilya Smirin won a silver medal.

== Participating communities ==
Not all Jewish communities participated in the 2005 Maccabiah, as has been the case since 1950. Jewish communities in Arab countries (Morocco, Tunisia, etc.), as well as the community in Iran, did not send delegations. The number in parentheses indicates the number of participants that community contributed.

- Argentina
- Australia (500)
- Azerbaijan
- Belarus
- Belgium
- Bolivia
- Bulgaria
- Brazil
- Canada
- Chile
- China
- Colombia
- Costa Rica
- Croatia
- Cyprus
- Czech Republic
- Denmark
- Finland
- France
- (Georgia (country)) Georgia
- Germany
- Greece
- Guatemala
- Hungary
- India
- Israel (2,000)
- Italy
- Latvia
- Lithuania
- Luxembourg
- (North Macedonia) Republic of Macedonia
- Mexico
- Moldova
- Netherlands
- New Zealand
- Panama
- Paraguay
- Peru
- Poland
- Portugal
- Romania
- Russia
- Serbia
- Singapore
- Slovakia
- Spain
- South Africa
- Sweden
- Switzerland
- Turkey
- Ukraine
- United Kingdom
- United States (900)
- Uruguay
- Venezuela

== Medal count ==
* Host nation (Israel)

Rank	Nation	Gold	Silver	Bronze	Total
1	Israel (ISR)*	228	194	172	594
2	United States (USA)	73	85	69	227
3	Russia (RUS)	15	18	18	51
4	South Africa (RSA)	13	8	8	29
5	Canada (CAN)	11	15	21	47
6	Venezuela (VEN)	6	2	2	10
7	Ukraine (UKR)	5	2	2	9
8	Brazil (BRA)	4	1	5	10
9	Australia (AUS)	3	8	27	38
10	Argentina (ARG)	3	4	6	13
11	Germany (GER)	2	5	2	9
12	Hungary (HUN)	2	2	4	8
13	Netherlands (NED)	2	0	0	2
14	Mexico (MEX)	1	7	19	27
15	Great Britain (GBR)	1	7	15	23
16	France (FRA)	1	4	3	8
17	Georgia (GEO)	1	1	1	3
18	Latvia (LAT)	1	1	0	2
19	Portugal (POR)	1	0	1	2
20	Belarus (BLR)	1	0	0	1
20	Italy (ITA)	1	0	0	1
22	Sweden (SWE)	0	1	3	4
23	Austria (AUT)	0	1	0	1
23	Poland (POL)	0	1	0	1
25	Azerbaijan (AZE)	0	0	3	3
26	Chile (CHI)	0	0	1	1
26	Costa Rica (CRC)	0	0	1	1
26	India (IND)	0	0	1	1
26	Romania (ROM)	0	0	1	1
26	Switzerland (SUI)	0	0	1	1
26	Turkey (TUR)	0	0	1	1
Totals (31 entries)		375	367	387	1,129

Source: 2005 Maccabiah Games medal count (xls file)

== Sports ==
The sports featured at the 2005 Maccabiah Games are listed below.

- Badminton
- Baseball
- Basketball
- Cricket
- Fencing
- Field hockey
- Football
- Futsal
- Golf
- Gymnastics
- Karate
- Lawn Bowling
- Rowing
- Rugby union
- Softball
- Squash
- Swimming
- Taekwondo
- Ten pin Bowling
- Tennis
- Track & Field
- Triathlon
- Volleyball
- Water polo
- Wrestling
