= Felix Gelt =

Canadian soccer player

Personal information
- Full name: Felix Gelt
- Height: 5 ft 10 in (1.78 m)
- Position: Defender

Youth career
- 1996–2000: UBC Thunderbirds varsity (CIS)

Senior career*
Years	Team	Apps	(Gls)
1996–99	Calgary Celtic/Callies (APL)		
2001–05	Vancouver Whitecaps (reserve squad)		
2001–05	North York Astros (CPSL)		

International career
2001, 2005, 2009	Maccabi Canada		
- * Club domestic league appearances and goals as of 00:28, 3 March 2010 (UTC)

Felix Gelt is a Canadian retired association football player who represented municipal, provincial, varsity, national, semi and professional teams. He played for the UBC Thunderbirds Men's Varsity Soccer Team, at the 1997 Canadian Summer Games, for the North York Astros, and for Team Canada at the 2005 Maccabiah Games and 2009 Maccabiah Games in Israel.

== Biography ==
Gelt's hometown is Calgary, Alberta, Canada. He was a center-back through most of his playing career and shifted to right-back later in his career. Gelt grew up playing soccer in southwest Calgary for Fish Creek Park, followed by Foothills Football Club. During those early years, he led his team as the Captain to winning multiple municipal and provincial championships in Alberta, Canada. In 1990, Gelt was the youngest player in Alberta history to make the U-15 provincial squad at the age of 12. He went on to become the Captain of the Alberta provincial team for several consecutive years growing through the U-15, U-17, and Youth programs. He competed at five consecutive National Championships winning several bronze medals. In 1997, Gelt represented Team Alberta at the Canadian Summer Games in Brandon, Manitoba. Based on his provincial play at competitive competitions, Gelt was invited to Canada national team try-outs for the Canada men's national under-17 soccer team and Canada men's national under-20 soccer team.

In 1996, Gelt joined the University of British Columbia (UBC; 2001) to play for the UBC Thunderbirds Men's Varsity Soccer Team, which has the most victorious record of all Canadian universities. Through his athletic and academic scholarships, Felix played four years at UBC winning three Canada West Championships and a silver medal at the 1999 Canadian Interuniversity Sport (CIS) National Championships. During his varsity career, Gelt was a scholar off the field where he pursued a Bachelor of Commerce degree. He was recognized as an Academic All-Canadian, an award for student athletes who combine athletic excellence with strong academic performance.

In 1999, Gelt was voted as the best defender in Alberta while representing the Calgary Callies. The Callies played at the Canadian National Challenge Cup in 1999 and were Men's National champions.

Post varsity, Gelt joined the Vancouver Whitecaps training and reserve squad given their affiliation with UBC. In 2001, he moved to Toronto, Ontario to join the Canadian Maccabi Team and to play semi-professional in the Canadian Professional Soccer League (CPSL) with the North York Astros from 2001 to 2005.

Felix was Captain of the first outdoor men's soccer team that Maccabi Canada sent to the 2005 Maccabiah Games. This experience culminated with beating the two-time defending champions Argentina 1–0 in the opening game of the tournament. Despite not advancing past their group, their victory over Argentina took the 2-time defending champions out of the tournament and shocked the international Maccabi soccer scene with Team Canada's performance. Four years later at the 2009 Maccabiah Games, Team Canada managed to advance to the quarter-final stage with a heart breaking loss to Mexico. At that point, Gelt retired from international and competitive playing to focus on his professional career. Gelt advanced a career as a management consultant.

=== International playing career ===
Gelt was named as Captain of the Canadian football squad competing at the 2005 Maccabiah Games and 2009 Maccabiah Games in Israel.

== Statistics ==
Club performance			League		Cup		League Cup		Continental		Total	
Season	Club	League	Apps	Goals	Apps	Goals	Apps	Goals	Apps	Goals	Apps	Goals
Canada			League		Voyageurs Cup		League Cup		North America		Total	
2001	North York Astros	CPSL	-	-	-	-	-	-	-	-	-	-
Career total			-	-	-	-	-	-	-	-	-	-
