= Kyle Altman =

American soccer player (born 1986)

Personal information
- Full name: Kyle Marten Altman
- Date of birth: January 31, 1986 (age 40)
- Place of birth: Albuquerque, New Mexico
- Height: 6 ft 1 in (1.85 m)
- Position: Defender

Youth career
- 2004–2007: Trinity Tigers

College career
Years	Team	Apps	(Gls)
- Trinity University

Senior career*
Years	Team	Apps	(Gls)
2004–2005	Albuquerque Asylum		
2006	DFW Tornados	8	(0)
2008	Minnesota Thunder	15	(0)
2010–2013	Minnesota United FC	98	(5)
- * Club domestic league appearances and goals as of April 6, 2013

Kyle Marten Altman (born January 31, 1986) is an American former soccer player, who last played for Minnesota United FC in the North American Soccer League. He was the 2003 New Mexico High School Coaches Association's Class 4A boys' soccer player of the year. He played college soccer at Trinity University, where he was a first team All American in 2006 and 2007. He played soccer professionally for the Minnesota Thunder and Minnesota United FC. He won a silver medal with Team USA at the 2005 Maccabiah Games in Israel.

== Early life ==
Altman was born and raised in Albuquerque, New Mexico, and later lived in St. Paul, Minnesota. His father is an orthopedic surgeon, and his paternal grandparents were Dr. Emmett Altman and Dr. Adele Altman.

== Soccer career ==
Altman attended Albuquerque Academy ('04). In high school, he was chosen the 2003 New Mexico High School Coaches Association's Class 4A boys' soccer player of the year.

=== College and amateur ===
He played college soccer at NCAA Division III Trinity University (Biochemistry; '09) in San Antonio, Texas, where he was a first team All American in 2006 and 2007. He was also named First Team 2006 NSCAA/Adidas Men's Scholar All-American. In 2007 he was named All-Southern Collegiate Athletic Conference Men's Soccer First Team. In 2021 he was named to the Southern Collegiate Athletic Conference's 30th Anniversary men's soccer team.

During his college years Altman also played with his home town team, Albuquerque Asylum, in the National Premier Soccer League, and with the DFW Tornados in the USL Premier Development League.

=== Professional ===
Altman was drafted in the second round (27th overall) of the 2008 MLS Supplemental Draft by New England Revolution. He was not offered a contract by the team, and was waived on February 3, 2008.

Altman knew long-time Minnesota Thunder (USL First Division) player Kevin Friedland and the team's head coach Amos Magee from his time participating in the Maccabiah Games. He was brought to Minnesota for a tryout, and was signed by Magee on March 11, 2008. He played 15 games for the team before being released at the end of the season.

After a year out of professional soccer to go back to school in 2009, Altman signed with the NSC Minnesota Stars of the USSF Division 2 on March 4, 2010.

Altman was named captain of the Minnesota Stars FC during the 2011 season, and captained the team to the North American Soccer League Soccer Bowl Championship. Minnesota announced in December 2011 that Altman would return for the 2012 season, his third with the club. Altman was named to the 2012 North American Soccer League Best XI All Star team after logging over 1,700 minutes and captaining Minnesota Stars FC to back-to-back Soccer Bowl appearances.

Altman announced he would retire from professional soccer following the conclusion of the 2013 NASL Spring season, in order to attend medical school at the University of Texas Health Science Center at San Antonio. He played his final game for Minnesota United on July 4, 2013.

=== International ===
Altman, who is Jewish, won a silver medal with Team USA at the 2005 Maccabiah Games in Israel, and was named to the national football side to represent the United States at the 2009 Maccabiah Games.

== Later life ==
Altman is now an orthopedist in Greenville, South Carolina, and is affiliated with Prisma Health Greenville Memorial Hospital.

== See also ==
- List of select Jewish football (association; soccer) players
