= Two-Boys Gumede =

South African soccer player

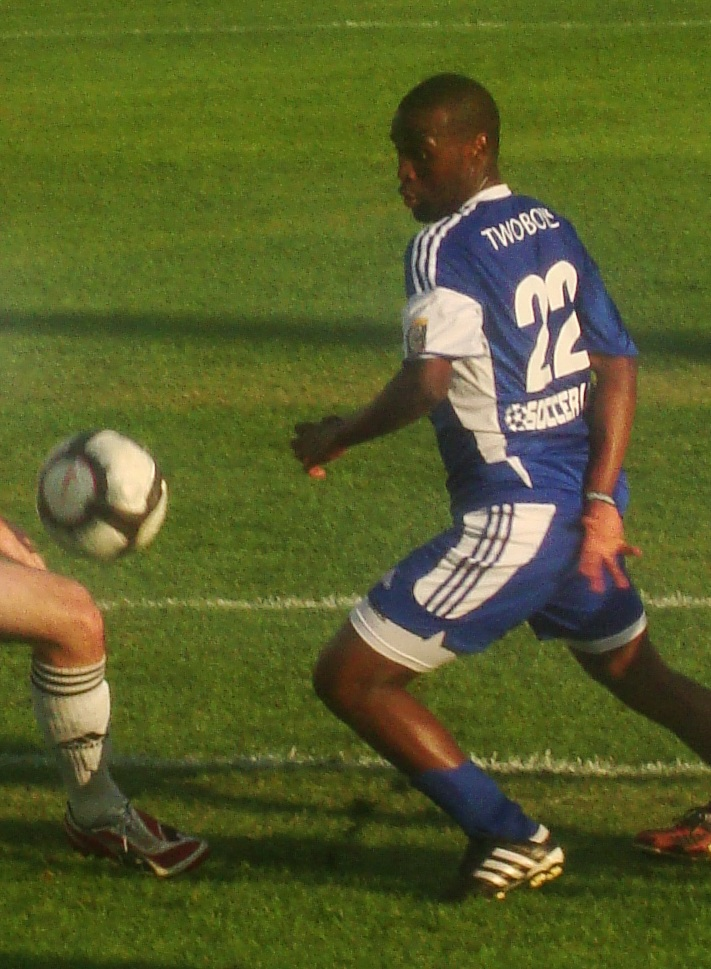

Personal information
- Full name: Two-Boys Gladstone Gumede
- Date of birth: 23 August 1985 (age 41)
- Place of birth: Durban, South Africa
- Height: 5 ft 9 in (1.75 m)
- Position: Midfielder

College career
Years	Team	Apps	(Gls)
2005–2009	UAB Blazers		

Senior career*
Years	Team	Apps	(Gls)
2009–2010	Panama City Pirates	25	(1)
2010–2011	NSC Minnesota Stars	7	(0)
2011–2013	River City Rovers	1	(0)
- * Club domestic league appearances and goals as of 22 September 2010

Two-Boys Gumede (born 23 August 1985 in Durban) is a former South African soccer midfielder.

== Early life ==
Gumede was the second boy in his family, leading his mother to suggest that she had "Two Boys".

He spent his early life in Tongaat (now oThongathi), a town near Durban, before moving to Johannesburg as a teenager to play soccer in a junior development team. While touring with the team in the United States he was offered the opportunity to join an exchange program. He moved to the United States in 2001 as an exchange student, joining a host family in Louisville, Kentucky. He attended Walden School, becoming the first member of his family to graduate high school.

== Playing career ==
He played for the Javanon Soccer Club, helping them to the 2003 Kentucky state club championship.

=== College and amateur ===
In 2005 Gumede began playing college soccer at the University of Alabama at Birmingham.

At UAB he was named to the Conference USA All-Freshman Team in 2005, earned second-team all-conference accolades as a sophomore in 2006, first team all-region and all-conference accolades in 2007 after redshirting his junior season when visa troubles kept him from returning to the United States after a visit to South Africa. He was named to the 2009 Hermann Trophy watchlist prior to his senior season in 2009.

During his college years Gumede played with the Panama City Pirates in the USL Premier Development League.

=== Professional ===
Having trained with Major League Soccer club D.C. United during the early part of 2010 Gumede was expected to be a prominent pick at the 2010 MLS SuperDraft, but was not selected by any team, due to an injury. He signed his first professional contract in 2010 when he was signed by the NSC Minnesota Stars of the USSF Division 2 Professional League.

He made his professional debut on 28 April 2010 in a game against the Rochester Rhinos.
