= Kevin Friedland =

American former soccer player (born 1981)

Personal information
- Full name: Kevin Friedland
- Date of birth: October 3, 1981 (age 45)
- Place of birth: Irvine, California, United States
- Height: 5 ft 8 in (1.73 m)
- Position: Defender

College career
Years	Team	Apps	(Gls)
2000–2002	SMU Mustangs		

Senior career*
Years	Team	Apps	(Gls)
2003	Kansas City Wizards	0	(0)
2004–2013	Minnesota United FC	149	(7)

Managerial career
- 2010–2013: Minnesota United FC (assistant)
Medal record
Representing United States
Football
Maccabiah Games
Silver medal – second place	2005 Maccabiah	Football
- * Club domestic league appearances and goals as of February 4, 2012

Kevin Friedland (born October 3, 1981) is an American former soccer player, who played as a defender. In high school, he was The Los Angeles Times Orange County boys’ soccer player of the year. Playing for Southern Methodist University, he was a second-team All American. Professionally, he played for the Minnesota Thunder, NSC Minnesota Stars, and Minnesota United FC. Friedland was part of the US squad which won the silver medal at the 2005 Maccabiah Games in Israel.

== Early life ==
Friedland is from New Brunswick, New Jersey, and lived in Irvine, California.

== Career ==
=== Youth and college ===
Friedland attended and played soccer at Woodbridge High School in Irvine, California. He was The Los Angeles Times Orange County boys’ soccer player of the year.

Friedland played club soccer for local club Strikers FC. He attended Southern Methodist University, where he was a second-team All American in soccer in 2002.

=== Professional ===
Friedland was drafted in the sixth round (53rd overall) of the 2003 MLS SuperDraft by Kansas City Wizards. However, he never played a league game for the team and was waived on November 25, 2003.

In 2004, he signed with the Minnesota Thunder of the USL First Division. On April 2, 2008, he signed a one-year contract, with a two-year option, with the Thunder.

On March 4, 2010, Friedland was signed as a player/assistant coach for the newly formed club NSC Minnesota Stars. He was a player/assistant coach for Minnesota United FC. In November 2013, he announced his retirement. Friedland made over 160 appearances, and won the 2011 NASL Soccer Bowl. At the time, at 10 years he was Minnesota's second-longest active professional athlete with a Minnesota team, trailing only Kevin Williams (Minnesota Vikings).

=== International ===
Friedland was part of the US squad which won the silver medal at the 2005 Maccabiah Games in Israel.

He also played for Team USA with Kyle Altman, winning the gold medal at the 2007 Pan American Maccabi Games in Argentina.
