= Minnesota United FC =

American professional soccer club based in Minneapolis–Saint Paul metropolitan area

Coordinates: 44.9528°N 93.1651°W

- Full name: Minnesota United Football Club
- Nicknames: The Loons, The Black and Blue
- Short name: MNUFC
- Founded: 2015; 11 years ago
- Stadium: Allianz Field; Saint Paul, Minnesota
- Capacity: 19,400
- Owner: Bill McGuire
- Head coach: Cameron Knowles
- League: Major League Soccer
- 2026: Western Conference: 10th Overall: 19th Playoffs: Did not qualify
- Website: mnufc.com
Home colors	Away colors	Third colors

Minnesota United Football Club, often shortened to Minnesota United or MNUFC, is an American professional soccer club based in the Minneapolis–Saint Paul metropolitan area. The club competes in Major League Soccer (MLS) as a member of the Western Conference. The club began play in the 2017 season as the league's 22nd club, and replaced the North American Soccer League (NASL) franchise of the same name.

The club played its home games at the TCF Bank Stadium (now Huntington Bank Stadium), on the campus of the University of Minnesota in Minneapolis, for its first two seasons in MLS play. Minnesota United completed construction of Allianz Field, a soccer-specific stadium in St. Paul's Midway neighborhood, in early 2019.

Minnesota United's ownership is led by Bill McGuire, former CEO of UnitedHealth Group, and includes other Minnesota sports owners: the Pohlad family, owners of the Twins; former Timberwolves owner Glen Taylor; former Wild investor Glen Nelson, and his daughter Wendy Carlson Nelson of the Carlson hospitality company.

== History ==
In January 2010, the National Sports Center announced they would field a new team to replace the Minnesota Thunder. The Thunder at the time were not officially folded but were facing financial difficulties. Following a team-naming contest, the National Sports Center (NSC) announced the official team name would be NSC Minnesota, with the team nickname being the Stars on February 5, 2010. Four days later, former United States men's national team player Manny Lagos was named as the club's first head coach.

The team played its first official game on April 11, 2010, a 2–0 loss to the Vancouver Whitecaps. The first goal in franchise history was scored by Daniel Wasson in their next game, a 1–0 victory over the Carolina RailHawks. The Stars enjoyed some impressive victories in their debut season, including a 3–1 win over Crystal Palace Baltimore, a 3–0 win over AC St. Louis, and a 3–1 win over FC Tampa Bay, eventually finishing fourth in their conference. Unfortunately for the Stars, they went out of the playoffs at the quarter-final stage, 4–0 on aggregate to the Carolina RailHawks, after defender Andres Arango was issued a red card after just 38 minutes. Simone Bracalello and Brian Cvilikas were the Stars' top scorers in 2010, with 5 goals each. The team averaged an attendance of 1,374 which was 10th out of the 12 league teams.

On January 9, 2012, the club announced a new logo as well as a new name. The NSC portion of the name, which had led to confusion, was dropped, with the new name being the Minnesota Stars. The new logo was revealed with the word 'NSC' removed and the state motto, L'Étoile du Nord, added. The team continued a search for a new owner in the offseason and opened the 2012 season with a 0–0 draw against the Carolina RailHawks at the Metrodome in front of a crowd of 8,693.

Minnesota faced an October 27, 2012, deadline to find new ownership to ensure a place in the NASL for the 2013 season. At the time the Minnesota Vikings expressed interest in professional soccer in Minnesota but were not contemplating purchasing the Stars. The league planned to vote on whether or not to fund the team for the 2013 season after the conclusion of the 2012 season. The USSF requirement that owners of a Division II team to be worth at least $20 million and a potential MLS bid by the Minnesota Vikings were seen as possible deterrents to finding a potential new owner. On November 9, 2012, the league officially announced that the team was purchased by Bill McGuire. On March 5, 2013, that was followed up by the team rebranding with the name Minnesota United FC. The $1.2 million budget that the Stars were operating on was expanded and the staff size increased to 20 employees for the start of the 2013 season, and has since more than doubled.

On March 25, 2015, Major League Soccer commissioner Don Garber announced Minnesota United as the league's 23rd club and awarded the franchise to a group led by McGuire. The ownership group includes other Minneapolis-St. Paul sports owners: Jim Pohlad, owner of the MLB's Minnesota Twins; Glen Taylor, former owner of the NBA's Minnesota Timberwolves; and the late Glen Nelson, former investor of the NHL's Minnesota Wild, along with his daughter Wendy Carlson Nelson, who is a board member of the Carlson Hospitality Company. They beat out a competing bid by Minnesota Vikings owners Mark and Zygi Wilf (both of whom would later become minority owners of MLS expansion franchise Nashville SC). Garber said Minnesota would begin play in 2017 or 2018 – if Los Angeles FC was not ready to play in 2017, Minnesota would take its place.

The Twin Cities were previously represented by the Minnesota Kicks in the top-level North American Soccer League (NASL) from 1976 to 1981, and later the Minnesota Strikers in 1984. The Kicks played their home games at Bloomington's Metropolitan Stadium, while the Strikers played at the Hubert H. Humphrey Metrodome.

The Minnesota Legislature had passed a bill in May 2012 for a new NFL stadium projected to open by fall 2016 and gave a provision allowing for the Vikings to pursue an MLS franchise, including a five-year exclusive window to host MLS games in the new stadium. The Wilfs' bid also had the support of Minneapolis Mayor Betsy Hodges, and Minnesota Senator Tom Bakk called Major League Soccer to inform them that the state legislature would not be providing financing for a soccer-specific stadium. However, Commissioner Garber said that whenever possible, the league preferred a stadium that would be an "outdoor, soccer-specific stadium, 20,000 seats, playing on grass" as opposed to larger, covered venues with artificial turf like U.S. Bank Stadium, and McGuire had the support of Hennepin County Commissioner Mike Opat and at least three members of the Minneapolis City Council.

=== 2017 season ===
The team played their inaugural Major League Soccer match on March 3, 2017, a 5–1 away defeat to the Portland Timbers at Providence Park. The result represented the heaviest defeat by an expansion side making their debut. Previously no MLS expansion team had lost by more than two goals in their first game. Christian Ramirez scored the team's first MLS goal. The following weekend they played their home opener against fellow expansion team Atlanta United in a snowstorm with an MLS record-low kickoff temperature of 19 °F (−7 °C). They lost the game 6–1, handing Minnesota more unwanted records including the record defeat of any expansion side and becoming the only team in MLS history to concede five or more in consecutive games. Following a 2–2 draw at the Colorado Rapids and a 5–2 loss at New England Revolution, United had conceded 18 goals in their first four games, which is an MLS record through the first six games of a season. The team got its first win in MLS with a 4–2 home victory over Real Salt Lake on April 1. As the season progressed, so had the team. In the mid-season, Minnesota had acquired Duluth native Ethan Finlay from Columbus Crew and made other signings to improve on the field. United finished its inaugural MLS season in ninth place in the Western Conference.

=== 2018 season ===
MNUFC lost two key players - midfielders Kevin Molino and Ethan Finlay - to season-ending knee injuries early in the 2018 season. Shortly before Finlay's injury, the team signed its first Designated Player; Darwin Quintero joined Minnesota United from Liga MX's Club América. Despite joining the team after five matches had already been played, Quintero led the team for 2018 in both goals (11) and assists (15). On July 4, 2018, Quintero scored a hat trick in a home match versus Toronto FC, the first in Minnesota United's history. Colombian forward Ángelo Rodríguez joined the club as its second Designated Player later in the season. MNUFC averaged nearly 24,000 fans per match during its second year at TCF Bank Stadium, including a crowd of 52,242 at the final match in their temporary home. The team managed 10 wins at home, but struggled on the road with only one victory.

On June 29, 2018, player Collin Martin came out publicly as gay, making him at the time the only out gay man in any of the big five American sports leagues or any top-division professional men's national soccer leagues. He was also reported at the time to be the only active male professional soccer player to be openly gay.

=== 2019 season ===
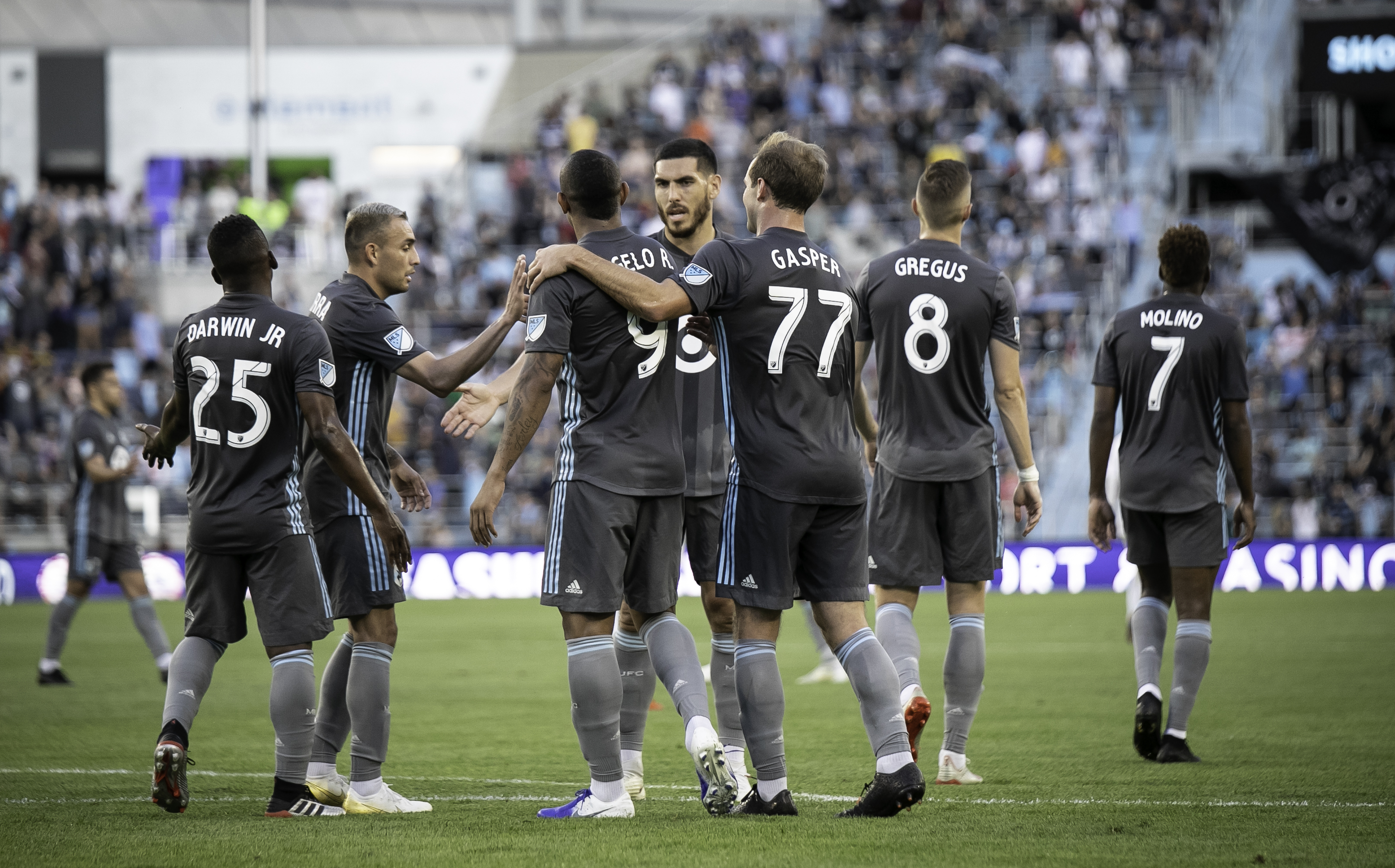
Minnesota United players in 2019 match vs. New Mexico United

MNUFC made substantial roster additions prior to the 2019 season, including its third Designated Player, midfielder Ján Greguš from Copenhagen; 2017 MLS Defender of the Year Ike Opara, traded from Sporting KC; longtime Seattle Sounders defensive midfielder Osvaldo Alonso; Ligue 2 defender Romain Métanire; and goalkeeper Vito Mannone, loaned from Reading

After beginning the 2019 season, with five matches on the road, MNUFC played their first match at the new Allianz Field on April 13, earning a 3–3 draw versus New York City. The team went on to post ten wins, six draws and two losses at home. MNUFC's performance on the road was vastly improved in 2019, posting five wins and two draws, including a 2-0 statement win at LAFC on September 1.

The club made a very successful run in the 2019 U.S. Open Cup. On August 27, the club traveled to the Mercedes Benz Stadium to take on Atlanta United in the Cup final, Minnesota's first final appearance since joining MLS. The match resulted in a 2–1 Atlanta victory.

MNUFC finished fourth in the Western Conference, after placing as high as second late in the regular season. As a result, the club was awarded a spot in the 2020 Leagues Cup. MNUFC played in its first MLS playoff match, hosting the LA Galaxy on October 20; the result was a 2–1 defeat.

Two players received league-wide honors at the conclusion of the season. Ike Opara was named 2019 MLS Defender of the Year, winning the award for the second time. Vito Mannone, who earned 11 cleansheets and conceded only 43 goals, was named 2019 MLS Goalkeeper of the Year.

=== 2020 season ===
After the 2019 season, Minnesota United traded Darwin Quintero to the Houston Dynamo for midfielder Marlon Hairston and $600,000 in allocation money. Upon the end of goalkeeper Vito Mannone's loan, Minnesota United brought in Tyler Miller (soccer) via trade with Los Angeles FC to take the starting job. Prior to the season, MNUFC added a number of players including striker Luis Amarilla via loan from Vélez Sarsfield.

The Loons got off to an excellent start for 2020 with two convincing road wins at the Portland Timbers and San Jose Earthquakes in March, before Major League Soccer suspended its season due to the COVID-19 pandemic, first for 30 days and then indefinitely as the severity of the pandemic became clearer.

The 2020 season restarted in July with the league's MLS is Back Tournament, held in Orlando, Florida and including 24 of the league's 26 teams. The month-long tournament included a group stage, counted as part of the regular season standings; and a knockout stage. The Loons finished second in Group D, with one win and two draws. In the knockout stage, MNUFC defeated the Columbus Crew 1–1 on penalty kicks and the San Jose Earthquakes 4–1, before losing to Orlando City in the tournament semifinal.

Following the tournament, the 2020 season resumed normal match play, with a planned schedule of 18 matches ending on November 8. The Loons continued to add players, with midfielder Emanuel Reynoso joining the club from Boca Juniors as a Designated Player, and veteran forward Kei Kamara joining via trade from the Colorado Rapids.

MNUFC finished the regular season in fourth place in the MLS Western Conference. They hosted their second playoff match in franchise history, defeating the Colorado Rapids 3–0 at Allianz Field, then went on to defeat No. 1 seeded Sporting Kansas City 3–0 on the road. The Loons then traveled to Seattle for the Western Conference final match against the Sounders. Despite leading 2-0 at the 75th minute, Seattle scored three straight late goals, including the winner in stoppage time to end Minnesota's historic run.

=== 2021 season ===
Although they had been minutes from advancing to the MLS Cup final in 2020, the 2021 season got off to a disappointing start, with four straight losses. In mid May, the Loons began to quickly climb from the bottom of the table, losing only two of their next seventeen games. Key players returned from injury and the squad signed Argentinian Franco Fragapane and Frenchman Adrien Hunou. They ended the regular season in fifth place, earning an opening round playoff berth on the road against the Portland Timbers, but their season was ended with a 3-1 Portland victory.

=== 2022 season ===
2022 saw the breakout of goalkeeper Dayne St. Clair, who anchored an impressive eight-save shutout against the New York Red Bulls in his week 3 debut. Success started early for the Loons in July in 2022, with a 4-0 win in a friendly vs Premier League side Everton. The Loons had a solid first half of the season going 8-6-3 in the first 17 games. In the 2022 U.S. Open Cup, Minnesota fell to USL League One side Union Omaha 2-1 in a notable upset. Midfield DP Emanuel Reynoso joined St. Clair in the 2022 MLS All-Star Game which was hosted at Allianz Field.

The second half of the season saw Minnesota struggle to find their footing, with a six-game winless streak going into the final two games of the season. Minnesota finally won a make-or-break game against Vancouver Whitecaps decision day to clinch the sixth seed in the 2022 MLS Cup playoffs, making them the only team in the western conference to qualify for the playoffs 4 years in a row. After finishing 120 minutes tied 1-1, MNUFC was knocked out of the playoffs in a (5)–(4) shootout against FC Dallas.

=== 2023 season ===
In 2023, the Loons ended their four-year run of successfully reaching the playoffs, finishing 21st in the league with a final record of 10 wins, 13 losses, and 11 draws. The season began on an inauspicious note, with star midfielder Emanuel Reynoso disappearing from training and missing the first 15 games of the season due to personal matters in his home country of Argentina, which notably affected the atmosphere of the team. While Reynoso returned and played the second half of the season, the team was not able to recover its form.

The disappointing regular season, as well as with lackluster playoff results in previous seasons, led to the club releasing head coach Adrian Heath on October 6, 2023. Heath had managed the Loons since its move to MLS in 2017. Assistant Sean McAuley served as interim head coach for the remaining two games of the season.

=== 2024 season ===
Ahead of the 2024 season, the club appointed Khaled El-Ahmad as sporting director. The appointment of El-Ahmad, who had previously worked with City Football Group and Barnsley Football Club, marked a major transition in the club's off-field leadership. In February, the club announced the hiring of new head coach Eric Ramsay, a Welshman who had previously served as a first-team assistant for Manchester United.

The Loons got off to a strong start, with two wins and a draw under interim head coach Cameron Knowles before Ramsay's arrival. The team struggled in the middle of the season, with a winless run of nine games, but achieved stronger results later on, and qualified for the 2024 MLS Cup Playoffs. The team finished the regular season 10th in the league, with 15 wins, 12 losses, and 7 draws.

The Loons defeated Real Salt Lake in the first round of the playoffs, prevailing over the Utahn side by winning two matches under the best of three series format. The decisive shootout in the second match took place in front of the Wonderwall supporters, and Goalkeeper Dayne St. Clair saved two penalties to send the team to the second round of the playoffs for the first time since 2020. The team's playoff run ended disappointly, with an embarrassing 6-2 defeat against evenutal champions LA Galaxy.

=== 2025 season ===
2025 marked head coach Eric Ramsay's first full season in charge, and the Welshman implemented a distinctive and controversial style focused on defense, counterattacks and set-pieces. The team averaged just 39.1% possession, lowest in the league, but still achieved a club record 58 points, and finished 8th in the league, with 16 wins, 8 losses, and 10 draws. They also set the league record for set-piece goals, scoring 21.

In the first round of the playoffs, the team faced the Seattle Sounders in a best-of-three series that came down to the third match after the teams split the first two. The third match was an instant classic, with the Loons conceding two early goals, then rallying on the back of a Joaquin Pereyra direct free kick. Despite Minnesota playing a man short for most of the match due to a 41st-minute red card, the match finished 3-3 and went to a penalty shootout. The shootout involved 20-penalties and finally ended when Sounder goalkeeper Andrew Thomas missed his attempt off the crossbar. While Ramsay's men would narrowly lose 1-0 in San Diego in the next round, the record-setting regular season and exciting first-round victory were a strong step forward for the club.

== Colors and badge ==
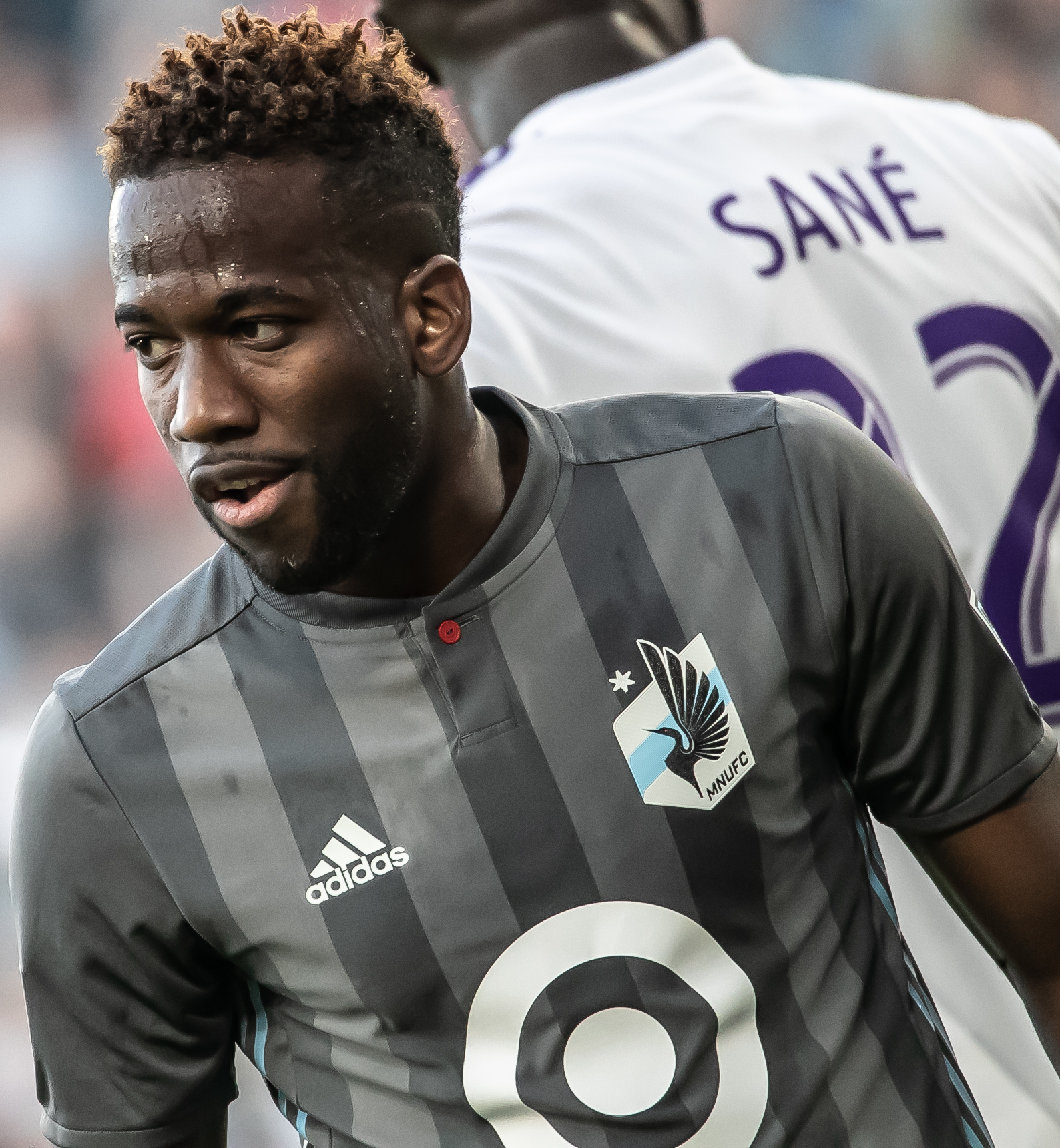
Kevin Molino in the club's 2018–19 home kit

The badge features a stylized loon, which is the state bird of Minnesota, with eleven spread feathers, one for each of the players on the field. The team's colors are gray, sky blue, and black, with a red accent. The blue line across the logo represents the Mississippi River. The two sides of the blue represent the cities of Saint Paul and Minneapolis. The gray color represents the Iron Range of Minnesota. The upward pointing crest and the North Star were inspired by L'Etoile du Nord which is the state motto. Zeus Jones created the designs.

=== Sponsorship ===
Period	Kit manufacturer	Shirt sponsor	Sleeve sponsor
2017–2020	Adidas	Target	—
2020–2022	Adidas	Target	Bell Bank
2023–2024	Adidas	Target	Allianz
2025–present	Adidas	Target	NutriSource Finley's

== Club culture ==
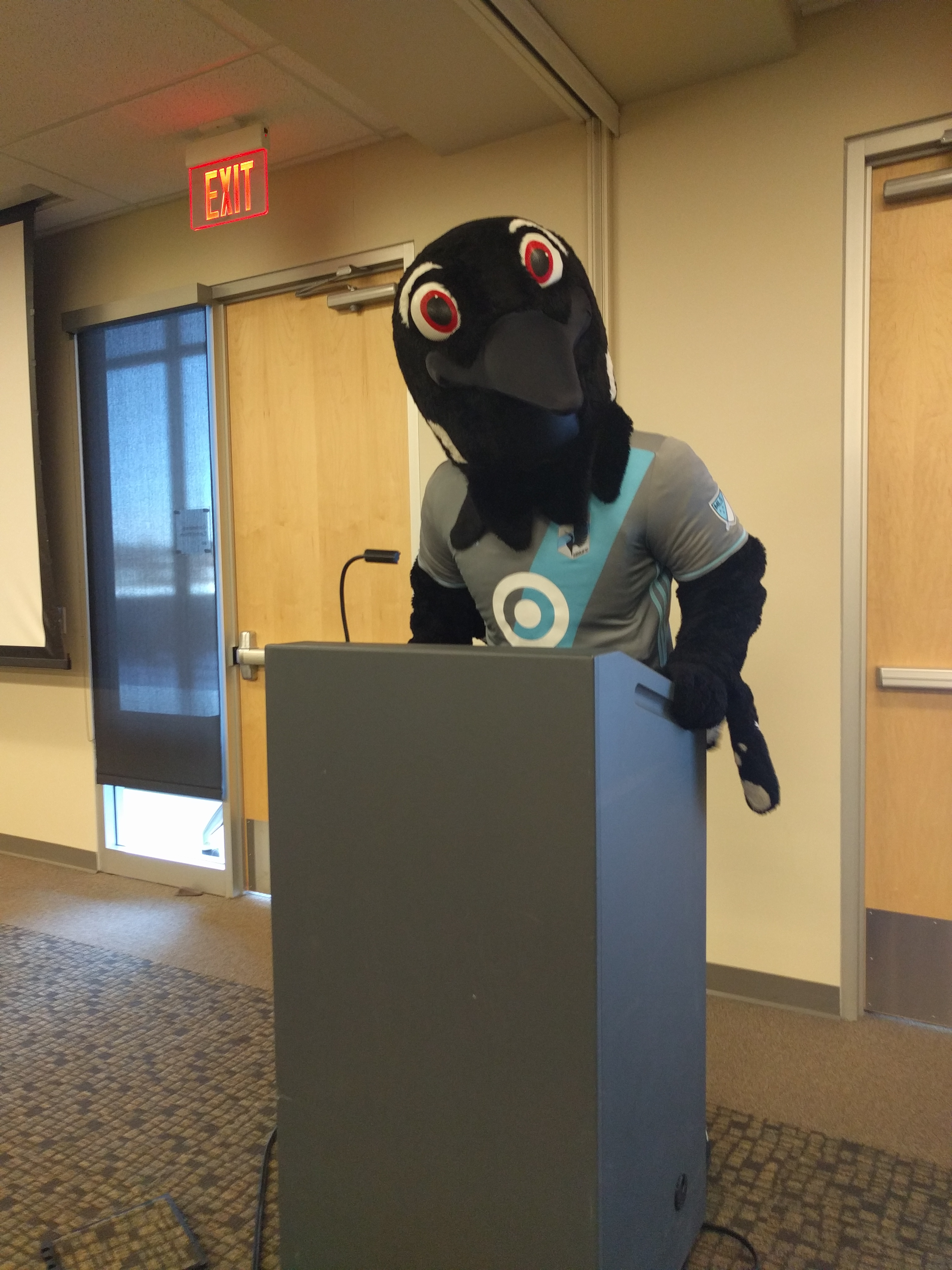
PK the loon

Minnesota United's mascot is PK, a loon. PK has been the club mascot since mid-2014. The two main supporter groups of Minnesota United are Dark Clouds and True North Elite, although the overarching organization "MNWonderwall" includes affiliated groups the Red Loons and Dark Glitterati as well. Along with these supporters, the Loons academy has played a big part to help grow youth in the community and to provide a path to the first team for the academy players. In early 2019, Wonderwall founded "THUNDERWALL", a coalition drumline permanently affixed in Allianz Field that provides percussion to support chants in the Wonderwall section during match days.

Fans of Minnesota United sing the Oasis song "Wonderwall" after all home victories.

== Stadium ==
McGuire stated a desire to build an 18,500-seat, outdoor soccer-specific stadium next to the Minneapolis Farmers Market in downtown Minneapolis. At the time of the club's launch, the league did not give any timeline for the stadium plan, but said it was working on finalizing a plan by July 1, 2015, the deadline set by the league. Minnesota Governor Mark Dayton said he would oppose a publicly financed stadium, but said he would not oppose ancillary support for infrastructure reinforcements.

In a plan released in April 2015, the ownership showed a projected cost for the stadium of $250 million: $100 million for MLS expansion fee, $30 million for land acquisition, and $120 million for construction. The ownership group met with Governor Dayton and other state political leaders to share the plan. The group asked the politicians for a sales tax exemption of up to $3 million on construction materials, as well as breaks or caps on city and county property taxes for the stadium site. The tax relief could potentially add up to around $50 million.

The day after the meeting, Mayor Hodges said she opposed the sales tax and property tax exemption because unlike other stadiums in Minneapolis that have received similar breaks, Minnesota United's stadium would be privately owned. The following week, the Minnesota Senate voted 61–4 to prevent any state funds or tax expenditures from being used for the stadium, although the vote was termed "largely symbolic" as McGuire had not asked for state funds and the bill would not prevent the team from seeking city or county funds. McGuire later said that he would be open to signing the property over to Minneapolis, Hennepin County, or another public entity if that would make property tax exemption possible.

Although the July 1 deadline passed without a stadium deal, and the plan for a Downtown Minneapolis stadium was the primary reason for choosing McGuire's group, league deputy commissioner Mark Abbott said Minnesota was still considered an expansion site, partly because of interest from the neighboring St. Paul. Later that month, St. Paul mayor Chris Coleman spoke to Abbott proposed building on a city-owned vacant lot that formerly housed the Metro Transit bus barn near Interstate 94.

On August 31, 2015, the team's deal for an exclusive right to purchase industrial land near the Farmer's Market expired with no public statement about any extension of the deal.

On September 8, 2015, the Ramsey County Board of Commissioners passed a non-binding resolution to support the stadium's construction on the St. Paul bus barn site, provided the design and construction are paid for by private funds. On October 23, 2015, it was announced that Minnesota United would build a stadium on the 35-acre St. Paul Bus Barn site. The proposed stadium will seat approximately 20,000 and will be privately financed.

On November 25, 2015, Minnesota United FC hired Populous to design the stadium. On December 9, 2015, the team hired Mortenson Construction as part of the stadium construction along with Populous.

On February 24, 2016, the team revealed design plans for their 21,500-seat soccer-specific stadium, set to be built by 2018 and financed privately by the team.

On July 25, 2017, the stadium's name was announced as Allianz Field, which opened in March 2019.

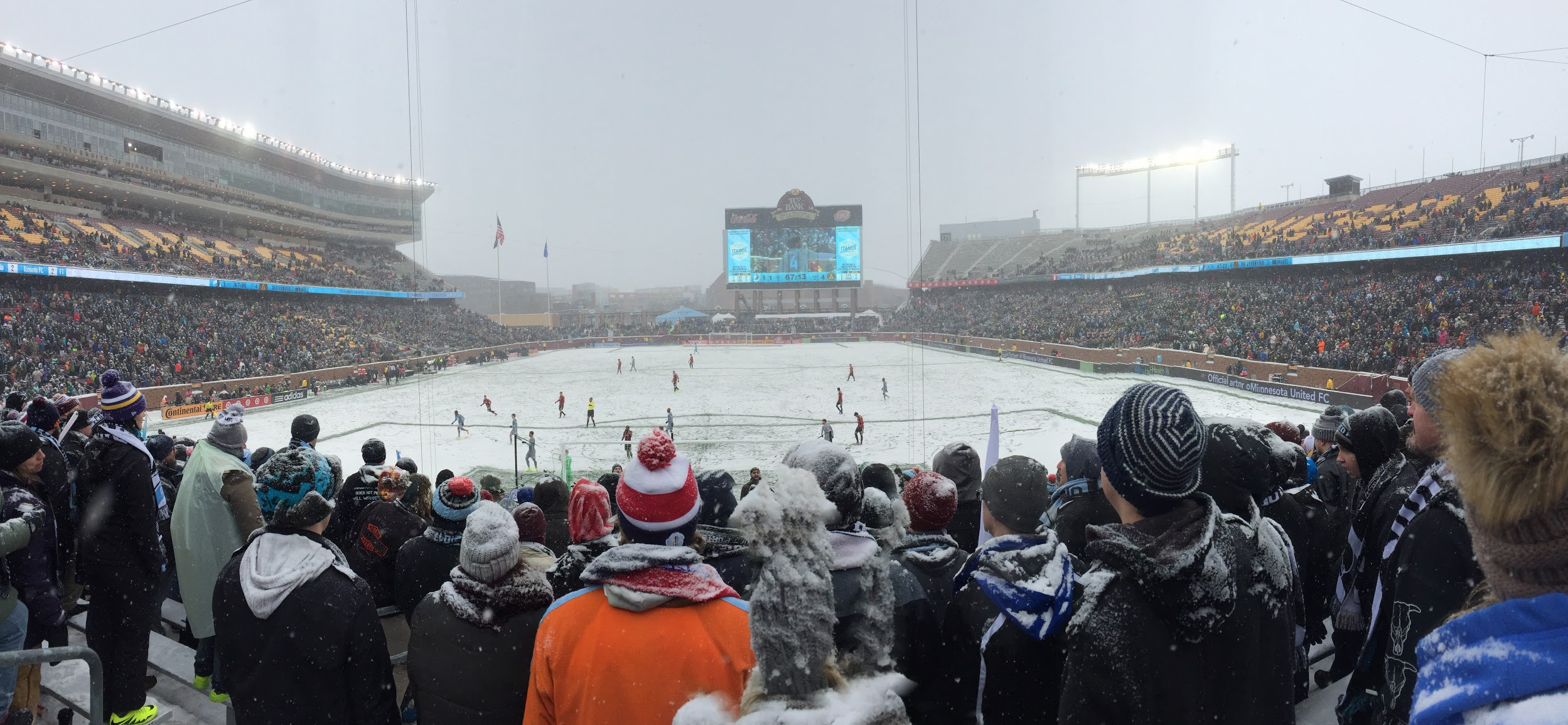
Minnesota United vs Atlanta United in their inaugural MLS home match at the TCF Bank Stadium, March 12, 2017.

On August 19, 2016, it was announced that Minnesota United would play in the 2017 Major League Soccer season, with home matches at the TCF Bank Stadium. The stadium had been home to the club for 2017–2018 while their soccer-specific stadium was in construction.

== Players and staff ==
=== Roster ===
As of November 19, 2026

Note: Flags indicate national team as defined under FIFA eligibility rules; some limited exceptions apply. Players may hold more than one non-FIFA nationality.

No.	Pos.	Nation	Player
1	GK	JOR	Alec Smir
3	DF	JAM	Kyle Duncan
5	DF	ARG	Nicolás Romero
6	MF	USA	Peter Stroud
8	FW	ARG	Tomás Chancalay
9	FW	ITA	Kelvin Yeboah (DP)
11	FW	GER	Maurice Malone
12	GK	USA	Drake Callender
13	DF	USA	Anthony Markanich
15	DF	NZL	Michael Boxall (captain)
16	FW	USA	Aziel Jackson (on loan from Jagiellonia Białystok)
18	FW	COL	Mauricio González
20	MF	USA	Wil Trapp
21	FW	RSA	Bongokuhle Hlongwane
22	FW	CAN	Marcus Caldeira

No.	Pos.	Nation	Player
23	DF	GER	Morris Duggan
25	MF	GRE	Nectarios Triantis
26	MF	ARG	Joaquín Pereyra (DP)
28	DF	COL	Jefferson Díaz
29	FW	SEN	Mamadou Dieng
30	MF	FRA	Owen Gene
33	DF	USA	Kieran Chandler
52	DF	CUW	Cherrion Valerius
67	MF	PAN	Carlos Harvey
94	GK	USA	Kayne Rizvanovich
98	FW	USA	Darius Randell

=== Out on loan ===
Note: Flags indicate national team as defined under FIFA eligibility rules; some limited exceptions apply. Players may hold more than one non-FIFA nationality.

No.	Pos.	Nation	Player
2	DF	USA	Devin Padelford (on loan to Red Bull New York)
7	MF	AUT	Dominik Fitz (on loan to Wolfsberger AC)
14	FW	CRC	Kenyel Michel (on loan to Alajuelense)

No.	Pos.	Nation	Player
16	MF	KOR	Jeong Ho-yeon (on loan to Suwon Samsung Bluewings)
35	DF	USA	Britton Fischer (on loan to Hartford Athletic)
96	GK	NED	Wessel Speel (on loan to Almere City)

=== Management ===
Coaching staff
Cameron Knowles	Head coach
Jeremy Hall	Assistant Coach
Josh Wolff	Assistant Coach
Fanendo Adi	Assistant Coach
Cristiano Costa	Head Goalkeeping Coach
Jonathan Barber	Goalkeeping Coach
Technical staff
Vacant	Chief Soccer Officer and Sporting Director
Álex da Rosa	Head of Business and Soccer Operation
Hank Stobbins	Head of Recruitment Roster Strategy and Negotiation
Amos Magee	Head of Development and Player Pathway
Front office
Bill McGuire	Managing Partner
Shari Ballard	Chief Executive Officer
Sara Daggett	Executive Vice President, Chief Legal Officer and Head of Public Affairs
John Guagliano	Chief Marketing Officer
Gretchen Korf	Executive Vice President, Chief Administrative Officer and Chief Financial Officer
Manny Lagos	Chief Development Officer
Bryant Pfeiffer	Executive Vice President, Chief Revenue Officer
Kasey Parks	Senior Counsel
Kristi Benson	Contracts Manager & Ownership Liaison

== Team records ==
=== List of seasons ===
As of August 29th, 2026

For the full season-by-season history, see List of Minnesota United FC seasons.

Season	League											Position		Playoffs	USOC	Continental / Other		Average attendance	Top goalscorer(s)	
Season	Div	League	Pld	W	L	D	GF	GA	GD	Pts	PPG	Conf.	Overall	Playoffs	USOC	Continental / Other		Average attendance	Name(s)	Goals
2017	1	MLS	34	10	18	6	47	70	–23	36	1.06	9th	19th	DNQ	R4	DNQ		20,538	(United States) Christian Ramirez	14
2018	1	MLS	34	11	20	3	49	71	–22	36	1.06	10th	18th	DNQ	Ro16	DNQ		23,902	(Colombia) Darwin Quintero	11
2019	1	MLS	34	15	11	8	52	43	+9	53	1.56	4th	7th	R1	RU	DNQ		19,723	(Colombia) Darwin Quintero	16
2020	1	MLS	21	9	5	7	36	26	+10	34	1.62	4th	9th	SF	NH	Leagues Cup MLS is Back Tournament	NH SF	N/A	(Trinidad and Tobago) Kevin Molino	13
2021	1	MLS	34	13	11	10	42	44	-2	49	1.44	5th	11th	R1	NH	DNQ		14,381	(Finland) Robin Lod	9
2022	1	MLS	34	14	14	6	48	51	-3	48	1.41	6th	11th	R1	Ro16	DNQ		19,555	(Argentina) Emanuel Reynoso	12
2023	1	MLS	34	10	13	11	46	51	-5	41	1.21	11th	21st	DNQ	Ro16	Leagues Cup	QF	19,568	(South Africa) Bongokuhle Hlongwane	17
2024	1	MLS	34	15	12	7	58	49	+9	52	1.53	6th	10th	QF	DNP	Leagues Cup	GS	19,566	(South Africa) Bongokuhle Hlongwane	11
2025	1	MLS	34	16	8	10	56	39	+17	58	1.71	4th	8th	QF	SF	Leagues Cup	LP	19,247	(Italy) Kelvin Yeboah (United States) Anthony Markanich	13
2026	1	MLS	22	7	7	8	30	32	-2	29	1.32	9th	15th	DNQ	Ro16	Leagues Cup	LP	19,330	(Italy) Kelvin Yeboah	11
Total	–	–	315	120	119	76	464	476	-12	436	1.38	–	–	–	–	–		–	(Finland) Robin Lod	41

1. Avg. attendance include statistics from league matches only.
2. Top goalscorer(s) includes all goals scored in league, playoffs, U.S. Open Cup, MLS is Back tournament, CONCACAF Champions League, FIFA Club World Cup, and other competitive continental matches.

=== Record vs. international opponents ===
Date	Competition	Venue	Home team	Result	Away team
February 3, 2017	Friendly	Kino Sports Complex	Minnesota United	1–1	(Croatia) Istra
July 15, 2017	Friendly	TCF Bank Stadium	Minnesota United	1–1	(Mexico) Atlas
July 11, 2018	Friendly	TCF Bank Stadium	Minnesota United	1–2	(Costa Rica) Saprissa
May 22, 2019	Friendly	Allianz Field	Minnesota United	0–1	(Germany) Hertha Berlin
July 17, 2019	Friendly	Allianz Field	Minnesota United	0–3	(England) Aston Villa
September 7, 2019	Friendly	Allianz Field	Minnesota United	2–2	(Mexico) Pachuca
February 19, 2022	Friendly	Providence Park	Minnesota United	2–2	(Norway) Viking
June 11, 2022	Friendly	Allianz Field	Minnesota United	4–3	(Germany) Paderborn 07
July 20, 2022	Friendly	Allianz Field	Minnesota United	4–0	(England) Everton
June 28, 2023	Friendly	Allianz Field	Minnesota United	2–1	(Germany) Kaiserslautern
July 23, 2023	Leagues Cup	Allianz Field	Minnesota United	4–0	(Mexico) Puebla
August 8, 2023	Leagues Cup	Allianz Field	Minnesota United	2(p)–2	(Mexico) Deportivo Toluca
March 20, 2024	Friendly	Allianz Field	Minnesota United	1–0	(Republic of Ireland) St Patrick's Athletic
July 30, 2024	Leagues Cup	Allianz Field	Minnesota United	1–0	(Mexico) Club Necaxa
July 7, 2025	Friendly	Allianz Field	Minnesota United	0–0	(Germany) Holstein Kiel
July 30, 2025	Leagues Cup	Allianz Field	Minnesota United	4–1	(Mexico) Querétaro F.C.
August 2, 2025	Leagues Cup	Shell Energy Stadium	(Mexico) Club América	3 (8) – 3 (7)	Minnesota United
August 6, 2025	Leagues Cup	Allianz Field	Minnesota United	0–2	(Mexico) Atlético San Luis

== Honors ==
=== Domestic ===
- U.S. Open Cup
  - Runners-up (1): 2019
- Eastern Conference (Playoff)
  - Runners-up (1): 2020

== Broadcasting ==
From 2023, every Minnesota United match is available via MLS Season Pass on the Apple TV app. Prior to streaming, Minnesota United aired on a number of stations and networks catering to the Twin Cities television market.

All non-nationally broadcast Minnesota United games were broadcast locally on WFTC for the 2017 Major League Soccer season, then moved to Bally Sports North and Bally Sports Wisconsin in the 2018 season (which were then named at the time as Fox Sports North and Fox Sports Wisconsin respectively). For the 2021 Major League Soccer season, WUCW became the over-the-air home of Minnesota United, airing 16 matches as simulcasts from Bally Sports North. KSTP serves as the team's radio partner.

Minnesota United's commentary team featured Callum Williams as the play-by-play commentator. Williams had previously worked for Sporting Kansas City when they were known as the Kansas City Wizards and during their rebrand as Sporting Kansas City. He has also worked in his native UK for notable broadcasters including the BBC and Sky Sports. Williams was joined in the commentary box by Kyndra de St. Aubin who provides color commentary. De St. Aubin, a Stillwater native, was the only female color commentator currently covering Major League Soccer. Prior to joining Minnesota United's broadcast team, she worked across the country covering many men's and women's soccer games at college and professional levels. She also covered the 2015 FIFA Women's World Cup as part of the five broadcast teams that covered that tournament.
