= Ely Allen =

American soccer player (born 1986)

Personal information
- Full name: Ely James Allen
- Date of birth: June 12, 1986 (age 40)
- Place of birth: Anchorage, Alaska, U.S.
- Height: 5 ft 11 in (1.80 m)
- Position: Midfielder

College career
Years	Team	Apps	(Gls)
2004–2007	Washington Huskies		

Senior career*
Years	Team	Apps	(Gls)
2008	Los Angeles Galaxy	12	(1)
2009	Seattle Wolves	16	(6)
2009	D.C. United	0	(0)
2010–2011	NSC Minnesota Stars	35	(3)
Total		63	(10)

International career^{‡}
2004–2005	United States U18	5	(0)
- * Club domestic league appearances and goals as of February 4, 2012 ‡ National team caps and goals as of April 3, 2015

Ely Allen (born June 12, 1986, in Anchorage, Alaska) is an American soccer player.

== Career ==
=== Youth ===
Allen grew up in Kent, Washington, attended Kentridge High School. He played youth soccer for Emerald City Football Club in Seattle, Washington.

=== College ===
Allen played college soccer at the University of Washington from 2004 to 2007.

=== Professional ===
Allen was the 21st overall pick in the 2008 MLS SuperDraft, selected by the Los Angeles Galaxy. During Galaxy's pre-season, in only his second professional appearance, Allen scored a goal (assisted by David Beckham) against Sydney FC in the Pan-Pacific Championship on February 23, 2008.

Allen made his MLS debut in the Galaxy's first match of the 2008 season against the Colorado Rapids on March 29, 2008. He scored his first MLS goal on June 7, 2008, also against the Colorado Rapids. On February 25, 2009, Allen was waived by the Galaxy due to frequent injury.

Following an unsuccessful trial with MLS expansion side Seattle Sounders FC due to illness, and having been unable to secure a professional contract elsewhere, Allen joined the Seattle Wolves of the USL Premier Development League on May 6, 2009. He went on to score 6 goals and contribute 6 assists in the 16 games he played for them.

On July 24, 2009, D.C. United announced it had signed Allen. He made his United debut in a friendly against Real Madrid on August 9, 2009, and made a couple of appearances for the team in the CONCACAF Champions League, but did not feature in league play, and was waived at the end of the season.

On March 31, 2010, Allen was signed as a player for the newly formed club NSC Minnesota Stars. As of March 14, 2012, the Stars announced that Allen had been released from the team for unspecified reasons.
