= Thomas Granum =

Norwegian footballer (born 1989)

Personal information
- Full name: Thomas Nymo Granum
- Date of birth: December 31, 1989 (age 36)
- Place of birth: Drammen, Norway
- Height: 1.78 m (5 ft 10 in)
- Position: Defender

Team information
- Current team: NSC Minnesota Stars
- Number: 2

Youth career
- 2007: Solberg SK

Senior career*
Years	Team	Apps	(Gls)
2008–2010	Strømsgodset	15	(0)
2010–	NSC Minnesota Stars	2	(0)
- * Club domestic league appearances and goals as of September 24, 2010

Thomas Granum (born December 31, 1989) is a Norwegian footballer currently playing for NSC Minnesota Stars in the USSF Division 2 Professional League.

== Career ==
=== Norway ===
Granum was a trainee at Norwegian Tippeligaen team Strømsgodset, graduating to the senior side in 2008 aged 19. He played several games for the team in his debut professional season, but took a year off from football in 2009 to concentrate on his studies, returning to Strømsgodset before the 2010 Norwegian season.

=== United States ===
Granum left Strømsgodset in April 2010 and moved to North America when he signed for the NSC Minnesota Stars of the USSF Division 2 Professional League. He made his debut for the Stars on June 15, 2010, in a Lamar Hunt U.S. Open Cup game against KC Athletics.
