= Joe Warren (soccer) =

American soccer player

Personal information
- Full name: Joseph Warren
- Date of birth: October 20, 1974 (age 52)
- Place of birth: Minneapolis, Minnesota, United States
- Height: 6 ft 4 in (1.93 m)
- Position: Goalkeeper

Youth career
- 1993–1998: St. Thomas Tommies

Senior career*
Years	Team	Apps	(Gls)
1998–2007	Minnesota Thunder	102	(0)
2010–2011	NSC Minnesota Stars	52	(0)

Managerial career
- 2004–2009: St. Olaf College (assistant)
- * Club domestic league appearances and goals as of February 4, 2012

Joe Warren (born October 20, 1974, in Minneapolis, Minnesota) is an American former soccer player.

== Career ==
=== College ===
Warren was an outstanding athlete at the University of St. Thomas, earning 11 letters in four different sports. He was a four-time soccer letterwinner earning All-MIAC honors his last three seasons. He also helped his team win one MIAC title and gain an NCAA bid. He finished his college career with 22 shutouts.

In track and field, he was a three time All-MIAC performer, was a two-year player for the Tommie basketball team, and as a punter for the American football team he established a school punting record his senior year with a 78-yard (71 m) effort in his first game. He was inducted into the St. Thomas Athletic Hall of Fame in 2007.

=== Professional ===
Warren turned professional in 1998 when he signed with Minnesota Thunder, then of the A-League. He subsequently played at with the Thunder for 10 years, six as the club's first choice goalkeeper. Warren retired from competitive play at the end of the 2007 season as the longest tenured player in the club's history, and took up a post as a coach at St. Olaf College in Northfield, Minnesota.

He returned to the professional game in 2010 when he signed with the NSC Minnesota Stars of the new USSF Division 2 Professional League, and established himself as his team's number one when original first choice Louis Crayton suffered a serious injury in the first game of the 2010 season.

Warren announced his retirement on January 27, 2011. Six weeks later he had a change of heart and re-joined the club for the 2011 season.

In his tenure as a professional player, Warren was a member of two national champion teams in 1999 and 2011.

== Coaching ==
Since 1998, Warren has been coaching soccer in various capacities throughout the Twin Cities in Minnesota. From 1998 to 2003, Warren was the varsity assistant girls' soccer coach at Richfield High School. From 2004 to 2009, he was the assistant men's soccer coach at St. Olaf College in Northfield, Minnesota. From 2010 through 2012, Warren served as assistant girls' varsity coach at Edina High School. From 2007 through 2019, he was a club coach at Minneapolis United Soccer Club. He currently coaches club soccer at the North Suburban Soccer Association (NSSA).

In 2018, he was named head coach of the Mounds View High School boys soccer team. Warren led the Mustangs to an MSHSL Class AAA state championship in 2021, defeating Rosemount High School 3–2 in the final.
