= Chris Clements (soccer) =

American soccer player

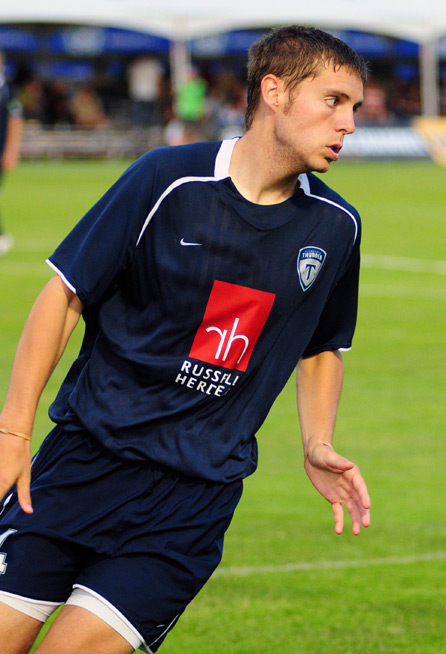

Personal information
- Full name: Christopher Clements
- Date of birth: March 2, 1987 (age 39)
- Place of birth: Allen, Texas, United States
- Height: 6 ft 2 in (1.88 m)
- Position: Defender

Youth career
- 2005–2008: Tulsa Golden Hurricane

Senior career*
Years	Team	Apps	(Gls)
2009	Minnesota Thunder	22	(0)
2010–2011	NSC Minnesota Stars	31	(0)
- * Club domestic league appearances and goals as of June 1, 2011

Chris Clements (born March 2, 1987) is an American soccer player.

== Career ==
=== Youth and college ===
Chris Clements was born in Allen, Texas. He attended Allen High School, played club soccer for the Dallas Texans, and played college soccer at the University of Tulsa where from 2005 until 2008, where he was selected to the All-Conference Third Team as a sophomore in 2006, and named to the NSCAA All-Midwest team and the NSCAA/adidas NCAA All-America Third Team as a junior.

=== Professional ===
Clements was drafted in the fourth round (60th overall) in the 2009 MLS SuperDraft by Columbus Crew, but was not offered a professional contract by the team.

Clements signed with the Minnesota Thunder of the USL First Division on April 15, 2007., and made his professional debut on April 18, 2009, in a game against the Austin Aztex.

On February 25, 2010, the NSC Minnesota Stars of the USSF Division 2 signed him. He was released by the club on November 29, 2011.

=== International ===
Clements was a member of the U20 National Team pool in the spring and summer of 2006.

=== Present Day ===
Clements is now an email nerd that codes sometimes.
