= Devin Del Do =

American soccer player (born 1986)

Personal information
- Date of birth: May 21, 1986 (age 40)
- Place of birth: Van Nuys, California, United States
- Height: 5 ft 9 in (1.75 m)
- Position: Forward

College career
| Years | Team | Apps | (Gls) |
| 2005–2009 | Cal State Northridge Matadors | 71 | (9) |

Senior career*
| Years | Team | Apps | (Gls) |
| 2006 | Bakersfield Brigade | 2 | (0) |
| 2007 | Orange County Blue Star | 6 | (1) |
| 2008 | San Fernando Valley Quakes | 14 | (8) |
| 2010–2012 | Minnesota Stars FC | 48 | (9) |
| 2013–2014 | Tampa Bay Rowdies | 15 | (1) |
- * Club domestic league appearances and goals as of January 26, 2015

Devin Del Do (born May 21, 1986) is an American soccer player who most recently played for the Tampa Bay Rowdies in the North American Soccer League.

== Career ==
=== College and amateur ===
Del Do grew up in Valencia, California, played for the West Valley Samba club team, and attended Hart High School where he was twice named to the All-Foothill League first team, and was his team's Most Valuable Player and Offensive Player of the Year as both a junior and senior.

He played college soccer at California State University, Northridge, but suffered two serious injuries which caused him to redshirt his freshman season, and again sit out what would have been his senior year in 2008. He earned All-Big West Conference honorable mention accolades as a sophomore in 2006.

During his college years Del Do also played with Bakersfield Brigade, Orange County Blue Star and the San Fernando Valley Quakes in the USL Premier Development League.

=== Professional ===
Del Do signed his first professional contract in 2010 when he was signed by the NSC Minnesota Stars of the USSF Division 2 Professional League. He made his professional debut on April 11, 2010, in a 2–0 loss to the Vancouver Whitecaps, but missed the majority of the 2010 season after suffering a knee injury in just his second professional game.

Del Do moved to Tampa Bay Rowdies on March 13, 2013.
