= Jeff Cosgriff =

American soccer player

Personal information
- Full name: Jeffrey Cosgriff
- Date of birth: December 26, 1987 (age 38)
- Place of birth: San Francisco, California, United States
- Height: 6 ft 4 in (1.93 m)
- Position: Midfielder

Youth career
- 2006–2008: Santa Clara Broncos
- 2009: California Golden Bears

Senior career*
Years	Team	Apps	(Gls)
2007	San Jose Frogs	2	(0)
2008	San Francisco Seals	4	(0)
2009	NorCal Lamorinda United		
2010	AC St. Louis	23	(2)
2011	Minnesota Stars FC	19	(2)
- * Club domestic league appearances and goals as of February 4, 2012

Jeff Cosgriff (born December 26, 1987, in San Francisco, California) is an American former soccer player.

== Career ==
=== Youth and amateur ===
Cosgriff grew up in San Bruno, California, attended St. Ignatius College Preparatory School, and played three years of college soccer at Santa Clara University, where he was named to the WCC All-Freshman team in 2006 and earned an All-WCC Honorable Mention in 2008, before transferring to the University of California, Berkeley for his senior year. He appeared in 64 games and scored nine goals during his three years with the Broncos, and played 18 games and scored six goals as a senior for the Golden Bears.

During his college years Cosgriff also played for the San Jose Frogs and the San Francisco Seals in the USL Premier Development League, and for NorCal Lamorinda United in the National Premier Soccer League.

=== Professional ===
Cosgriff signed his first professional contract in 2010 when he was signed by AC St. Louis of the USSF Division 2 Professional League. He made his professional debut on April 10, 2010, in St. Louis's first ever game, against Carolina RailHawks.

After the demise of AC St. Louis following the 2010 season, Cosgriff signed with NSC Minnesota Stars of the North American Soccer League on March 22, 2011.
