= Simone Bracalello =

Italian footballer

Personal information
- Full name: Simone Bracalello
- Date of birth: October 21, 1985 (age 41)
- Place of birth: Genoa, Italy
- Height: 6 ft 0 in (1.83 m)
- Position: Striker

Team information
- Current team: Wake FC
- Number: 7

Youth career
- 1995–2000: Sampdoria
- 2000–2001: Sestrese
- 2001–2002: Savona

Senior career*
Years	Team	Apps	(Gls)
2002–2003	Savona	1	(0)
2003–2004	Como	1	(0)
2004–2005	Vado	28	(3)
2005–2006	Sestri Levante	30	(3)
2006–2007	Pontedecimo Polis	50	(26)
2007–2008	Prato	23	(3)
2010–2014	Minnesota United	158	(43)
2015-2017	Carolina RailHawks	22	(2)
- * Club domestic league appearances and goals

Simone Bracalello (born October 21, 1985), also known in Italy as Bracca, is an Italian former footballer who played as a Striker.

== Career ==
=== Italy ===
Born in Genoa, Bracalello was a member of the youth academy at famed Italian club Sampdoria before making his professional debut in 2002 aged 17 playing with Savona in Serie C2. He went on to play extensively in the Italian lower leagues, including stints with teams such as Vado and Prato in Serie D and Lega Pro Seconda Divisione, before leaving Prato at the end of 2008.

=== United States ===
Bracalello trained with Serie C1 side Pescara, and with Australian side Newcastle Jets in 2008, and attended a combine with the Minnesota Thunder in 2009, before being signed by the NSC Minnesota Stars of the USSF Division 2 Professional League in the United States in early 2010. During his first season with the Stars, Bracalello was used primarily as a substitute, often having an immediate impact on the match.

On June 9, 2010 during a home game against the Montreal Impact, he assisted on Melvin Tarley's game-winning goal in the 87th minute. Six days later, Bracalello scored his first goal for the Stars in a 4–2 win over the KC Athletics in the U.S. Open Cup.

On January 6, 2015 the Carolina Railhawks announced that they had signed Bracalello.
