= Warren Ukah =

American soccer player (born 1985)

Personal information
- Full name: Warren Olaka Ukah
- Date of birth: March 22, 1985 (age 41)
- Place of birth: Atlanta, United States
- Height: 6 ft 0 in (1.83 m)
- Position: Forward

Senior career*
Years	Team	Apps	(Gls)
2003–2004	Village United		
2004	Wilmington Hammerheads	13	(4)
2004–2005	Village United		
2005	Virginia Beach Mariners	13	(4)
2006–2008	Atlanta Silverbacks	44	(18)
2007–08	Milwaukee Wave (indoor)	27	(14)
2009	Portland Timbers U23s	2	(3)
2009	Rochester Rhinos	12	(5)
2010	NSC Minnesota Stars	19	(6)
2010–12	Baltimore Blast (indoor)	28	(16)
2011	FC Tampa Bay	21	(7)
2014	Las Vegas Legends (indoor)	10	(7)
2014	Ontario Fury (indoor)	5	(6)
- * Club domestic league appearances and goals as of September 11, 2015

Warren Ukah (born March 22, 1985, in Atlanta) is an American soccer player.

== Career ==
Ukah attended Grady High School before turning professional at the age of eighteen, in 2003 with Village United in the Jamaica National Premier League. Following the 2003–2004 Jamaican season. At nineteen, he returned to the US to play the summer season with the Wilmington Hammerheads of the USL Pro Soccer League. He went back to Village United for the 2004–2005 season then came back north in 2005 to play for the Virginia Beach Mariners in the USL Second Division.

In 2006, twenty-one-year-old Ukah signed with the Atlanta Silverbacks of the USL First Division. He spent three seasons with the Silverbacks and lead them to the league championship in 2007, but lost much of the 2008 season with injuries. The team withdrew from the league at the end of the season. Ukah signed with the Milwaukee Wave of Major Indoor Soccer League in 2007. He was named to the 2007–2008 MISL All-Rookie Team.

In 2009, Ukah signed with Portland Timbers', for their inaugural campaign but played just two games before moving to the Rochester Rhinos in July 2009. On March 22, 2010, he signed with Minnesota United FC.

Ukah played for the Baltimore Blast of the Major Indoor Soccer League for the 2010–11 season. He played in 17 of the team's 20 regular season games, scoring 19 points (1 3G, 4 2G, 8 A).

Ukah signed with NASL club FC Tampa Bay on March 28, 2011. On October 4, 2011, after conclusion of the 2011 season, FC Tampa Bay announced it would not re-sign Ukah for the 2012 season.

Ukah played in South East Asia from 2012–2013 until returning to the United States to play indoor in the MASL. Ukah, started the 2014 NISL season with Oxford City FC of Texas before being dealt to Las Vegas. In seven games with Las Vegas Legends, Ukah scored five goals before he was traded to Ontario Fury.
