= Andres Arango =

Canadian soccer player (born 1983)

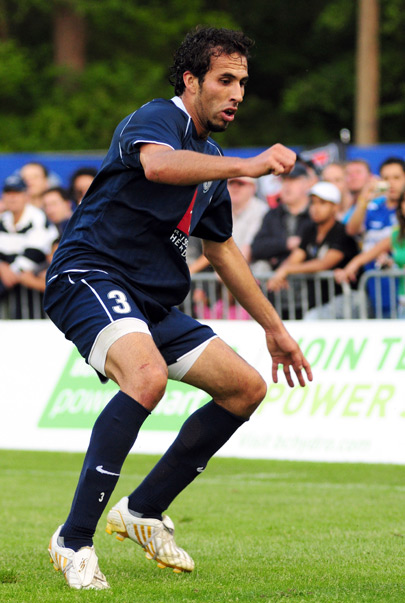
- Arango in 2009

Personal information
- Full name: Andrés Arango
- Date of birth: April 23, 1983 (age 43)
- Place of birth: Medellín, Colombia
- Height: 6 ft 0 in (1.83 m)
- Position: Defender

Youth career
- 2001: Humber Hawks

Senior career*
Years	Team	Apps	(Gls)
2002	York Region Shooters		
2003	Montreal Impact	2	(0)
2004–2006	Toronto Lynx	69	(1)
2007	Montreal Impact	21	(0)
2008–2009	Minnesota Thunder	37	(0)
2010	NSC Minnesota Stars	28	(1)
2011–2013	Tampa Bay Rowdies	41	(2)

International career^{‡}
2002–2003	Canada U20	17	(0)
2002–2003	Canada U23	3	(0)

Managerial career
- 2020–2021: Rowdies U23
- 2022–: Florida Premier FC
- * Club domestic league appearances and goals as of June 17, 2022 ‡ National team caps and goals as of April 13, 2018

Andres Arango (born April 23, 1983) is a former soccer player who played in the Canadian Professional Soccer League, USL A-League, and the North American Soccer League. Arango is currently a coach with Florida Premier FC in the United Premier Soccer League. Born in Colombia, he represented Canada at youth level as a player.

== Club career ==
=== Youth and college ===
Arango moved from his native Colombia to Canada with his parents as a young child. He played college soccer for Humber College where he won the Provincial and National Championship and was voted MVP of the national tournament.

=== Early career ===
Arango began his career in 2002 with the York Region Shooters in the Canadian Professional Soccer League. In 2003, he signed with the Montreal Impact of the USL A-League. After failing to break into the starting lineup he was traded in the off-season to league rivals the Toronto Lynx in exchange for veteran defender Mauricio Vincello.

The trade to Toronto provided Arango with more playing time opportunities as he played in 22 games throughout the season. He recorded his first goal for Toronto on July 18, 2004, versus Calgary Mustangs. He re-signed with Toronto for the 2005 season. At the conclusion of the season, he was named the club's Defensive Player of the Year. In 2006, he returned to Toronto for the third and final season with the club. During the 2006 season, he was named Toronto Lynx Defensive Player of the Year for the second straight year. He also played in the 2006 Open Canada Cup final where Toronto finished as runners up to Ottawa St. Anthony Italia.

=== Montreal Impact ===
After the relegation of Toronto to the Premier Development League in 2007, he returned to his former club the Montreal Impact on a two-year deal. Originally Toronto FC of the Major League Soccer expressed interest in Arango but instead chose Montreal as his final decision. In the initial stages of the season, he assisted Montreal in achieving an eight-game undefeated streak. Throughout the season he aided Montreal in successfully winning the 2007 Voyageurs Cup.

=== United States ===
In 2008, he played abroad in the United States as league rivals Minnesota Thunder signed him along with former Impact teammate Frederico Moojen. He re-signed with Minnesota for the 2009 season. In 2010, the Minnesota Thunder folded and was succeeded by NSC Minnesota Stars where he was granted a contract on February 25, 2010. In his debut season with Minnesota, he served as the team captain. After a single season with Minnesota Stars, he had his contract terminated in early 2011.

Arango signed a two-year contract with FC Tampa Bay of the North American Soccer League in 2011. He made his debut for Tampa on April 23, 2011, against former club Montreal Impact. In 2012, he assisted Tampa Bay in winning the NASL Championship after defeating Minnesota Stars in a two-game series. He re-signed with Tampa Bay for the 2013 season. Following the 2013 NASL season, Arango announced his retirement on March 1, 2014.

== International career ==
Arango also featured for the Canadian U20 team that made it to the quarter-finals in the 2003 FIFA World Youth Championship. He played in the quarterfinal match where Spain eliminated Canada from the tournament.

== Managerial career ==
In January 2020, Arango was announced as the head coach for the Tampa Bay Rowdies U23 USL League Two side. Due to the COVID-19 pandemic the season was canceled and the team was replaced by Tampa Bay United SC.

== Honours ==
Tampa Bay Rowdies

- NASL Championship
  - Winners: 2012
