= Daniel Wasson =

American soccer player (born 1984)

Personal information
- Full name: Daniel Wasson
- Date of birth: June 15, 1984 (age 42)
- Place of birth: Ardmore, Oklahoma, United States
- Height: 5 ft 9 in (1.75 m)
- Positions: Defender; midfielder

Youth career
- 2002–2003: Air Force Falcons
- 2004–2005: Tulsa Golden Hurricane

Senior career*
Years	Team	Apps	(Gls)
2004	Colorado Springs Blizzard	12	(10)
2005	Chicago Fire Premier	11	(1)
2006–2007	Colorado Rapids	22	(1)
2007–2008	SV Meppen	11	(0)
2008–2009	VfL Osnabrück II	21	(0)
2010–2012	Minnesota Stars FC	36	(2)
2013–?	Tulsa Athletic	20	(5)
- * Club domestic league appearances and goals as of August 30, 2012

Daniel Wasson (born June 15, 1984) is an American soccer player who last played for Tulsa Athletic in the National Premier Soccer League.

== Career ==
=== College and amateur ===
Wasson was born in Ardmore, Oklahoma. He grew up in Colorado Springs, Colorado, attended Liberty High School, and began his college soccer career at the United States Air Force Academy where he scored 23 goals in 37 games and was named to the all-conference second team, two regular season all-tournament teams and the MPSF all-tournament squad as a freshman. He transferred to the University of Tulsa prior to his junior year, and subsequently he appeared in 43 games, scoring 8 goals and 6 assists, being named to the all-MVC first team, the all-Midwest Region second team, and his team's Defensive Player of the Year.

During his college years he also played with Colorado Springs Blizzard and Chicago Fire Premier in the USL Premier Development League.

=== Professional ===
Wasson was drafted in the fourth round (38th overall) of the 2006 MLS Supplemental Draft by the Colorado Rapids. He played 22 games for Rapids in 2006 and 2007 before leaving the club to try his hand in Europe.

He signed with German side SV Meppen, and then moved to VfL Osnabrück II and then returned to the United States at the end of the 2008/2009 season.

On March 31, 2010, Wasson signed for the newly formed USSF Division 2 Professional League club NSC Minnesota Stars. He scored the first goal in NSC Minnesota's history on April 16, 2010, the only goal of a 1–0 victory over the Carolina RailHawks.

In July 2013, Wasson signed with the Tulsa Athletics of the NPSL. At the onset of the 2014 season he was named team captain. He continues to hold this position.
