= Melvin Tarley =

Liberian footballer (born 1982)

Personal information
- Full name: Duncan Tarley
- Date of birth: October 31, 1982 (age 44)
- Place of birth: Monrovia, Liberia
- Height: 6 ft 1 in (1.85 m)
- Position: Forward

Senior career*
| Years | Team | Apps | (Gls) |
| 2001–2002 | Chaspel FC | | |
| 2002–2003 | Alliance FC | 14 | (22) |
| 2003–2005 | Minnesota Thunder | 63 | (16) |
| 2005–2006 | Real Salt Lake | 9 | (1) |
| 2006 | Colorado Rapids | 3 | (0) |
| 2006–2007 | Minnesota Thunder | 18 | (5) |
| 2007 | Puerto Rico Islanders | 14 | (3) |
| 2007 | Miami FC | 2 | (0) |
| 2008–2009 | Minnesota Thunder | 54 | (18) |
| 2012 | Phnom Penh Crown | 5 | (3) |
| 2013 | DSK Shivajians F.C. | | |

International career^{‡}
| 2004 | Liberia | 2 | (0) |
- * Club domestic league appearances and goals as of September 22, 2010 ‡ National team caps and goals as of April 13, 2009

Duncan "Melvin" Tarley (born October 31, 1982) is a Liberian former professional footballer.

== Career ==
=== Professional ===
Tarley first came to prominence in 2005, during Minnesota Thunder's run to the semi-finals of the 2005 Lamar Hunt U.S. Open Cup. Tarley scored six goals in the competition - including four against Real Salt Lake - to tie as the tournament's top goalscorer.

Tarley's first appearance in Major League Soccer came with Real Salt Lake in 2005. The Colorado Rapids acquired Tarley's rights from Real Salt Lake in exchange for a 4th-round pick in the 2007 MLS Supplemental Draft on August 15, 2006, but he was waived by the Rapids at the end of the 2006 season having appeared in just three games. He returned to the Minnesota Thunder of the USL-1 for one season, prior to joining the Puerto Rico Islanders in 2007, and later moving on to Miami FC, also in 2007.

Tarley re-joined Minnesota Thunder in 2008. On March 22, 2010, he signed with NSC Minnesota Stars. In 2012–13 season, he moved to Indian I-League club DSK Shivajians.

=== International ===
At the time of Tarley's selection for the Liberian U-21 national team in 1998, he was the youngest player in team history, only 14 years old. He played his first game for the senior national team in 2004.

== Personal life ==
Tarley's football hero during his youth in Liberia was George Weah, while his current favorite player is Thierry Henry.
