= Brian Cvilikas =

American soccer player

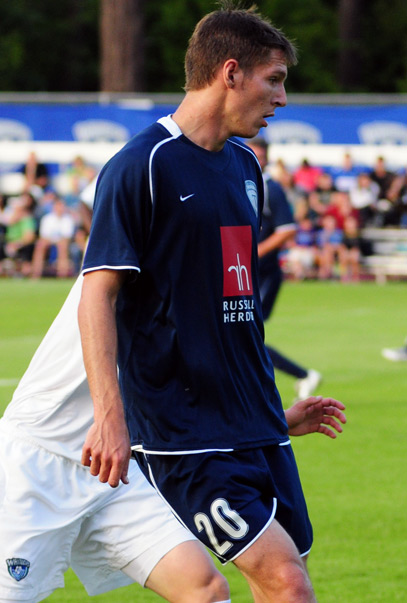

Personal information
- Full name: Brian Cvilikas
- Date of birth: March 16, 1984 (age 42)
- Place of birth: Highlands Ranch, Colorado, United States
- Height: 6 ft 3 in (1.91 m)
- Position: Forward

Youth career
- 2002–2005: Old Dominion Monarchs

Senior career*
Years	Team	Apps	(Gls)
2005	Williamsburg Legacy	14	(7)
2006	Virginia Beach Mariners	6	(1)
2007, 2008	Wilmington Hammerheads	34	(9)
2008, 2009	Minnesota Thunder	32	(6)
2010, 2011	NSC Minnesota Stars	34	(8)
- * Club domestic league appearances and goals as of September 27, 2011

Brian Cvilikas (born March 16, 1984) is an American former soccer player. He now is a US Soccer Federation certified A License Coach.

== Career ==
=== College and amateur ===
Cvilikas grew up in Colorado, attending Highlands Ranch High School where he was a first team All State soccer player. He then attended Old Dominion University where he played on the men's college soccer team from 2002 to 2005. He was the 2005 CAA Player of the Year, and was named College Soccer News and Soccer America National Player of the Week. He led the CAA in scoring with 15 goals. He earned NSCAA All-American honors. In 2005, preceding his senior year, Cvilikas played for Williamsburg Legacy in the USL Premier Development League.

=== Professional ===
In January 2006, the NY MetroStars selected him in the third round (twenty-sixth overall) in the 2006 MLS Supplemental Draft. He appeared several times with their reserve team along with the Columbus Crew. He then signed with the Virginia Beach Mariners. In 2007, Cvilikas moved to the Wilmington Hammerheads, playing with them until August 2008 and receiving Team Offensive MVP honors. On August 13, 2008, the Minnesota Thunder of the USL First Division signed him.

On February 19, 2010, the team established a new name and ownership as NSC Minnesota Stars of the USSF Division 2 and re-signed him. The league changed to the North American Soccer League the following season and the club went on to win the 2011 NASL Championship.
