= 2010 Miami FC season =

Miami FC
2010 season
- Chairman: Aaron Davidson
- Manager: Victor Pastora; Daryl Shore
- USSF Division 2: 9th
- USSF Division 2 playoffs: did not qualify
- U.S. Open Cup: Round of 16
- Top goalscorer: League: Paulo Araujo Jr. (8); All: Paulo Araujo Jr. (13)
- Highest home attendance: 1,855
- Lowest home attendance: 742
- Average home league attendance: 1,254
Home colours	Away colours

The 2010 Miami FC season was the fifth season of the club. Previously, they fielded a team in the USL First Division. Along with other clubs, Miami FC broke away from the previous league to form the new North American Soccer League. Nonetheless, the club fielded a team in the NASL Conference of the USSF Division 2 Professional League, the second tier of the American Soccer Pyramid at the time. (The USSF D2 was a temporary professional soccer league created by the United States Soccer Federation (USSF) in 2010 to last just one season. It was a compromise between the debating United Soccer Leagues (USL) and the North American Soccer League (NASL) while the USSF determined which league would eventually receive second or third division status). This year the team finished fourth in the NASL Conference Standings and ninth in the playoff standings, missing the post season. This was the last year of the team as the new NASL was launched the following year. The club connected with the original Fort Lauderdale Strikers club and launched a new team and franchise in the NASL under the Strikers' name starting in the 2011 season.

== Conference table ==
NASL Conference
Pos	Team	Pld	W	L	T	GF	GA	GD	Pts	Qualification
1	Carolina RailHawks FC	30	13	9	8	44	32	+12	47	Conference leader, qualified for playoffs
2	Vancouver Whitecaps FC	30	10	5	15	32	22	+10	45	Qualified for playoffs (Note: The remaining six teams with the highest point totals, regardless of conference, also advance to the playoffs.)
3	Montreal Impact	30	12	11	7	36	30	+6	43	Qualified for playoffs
4	Miami FC	30	7	11	12	37	49	−12	33	
5	AC St. Louis	30	7	15	8	32	48	−16	29	
6	Crystal Palace Baltimore	30	6	18	6	24	55	−31	24	

Source: USSF D-2 schedule table

=== 2010 roster ===
Note: Flags indicate national team as defined under FIFA eligibility rules; some limited exceptions apply. Players may hold more than one non-FIFA nationality.

No.	Pos.	Nation	Player
1	GK	USA	Lance Parker
2	DF	BRA	Euzébio Neto
3	DF	USA	Zach Kirby
4	DF	BRA	Cristiano Dias
5	DF	GUY	J. P. Rodrigues
6	DF	LBR	Chris Gbandi
7	FW	USA	Stefan Jerome
8	MF	BRA	Lennon
9	FW	USA	Abe Thompson
10	MF	ARG	Christian Gómez
11	FW	GUA	Edward Santeliz
12	DF	USA	Mike Randolph
14	MF	USA	Jarryd Goldberg
15	MF	BRA	Paulinho Le Petit

No.	Pos.	Nation	Player
16	DF	USA	Kyle Veris
17	FW	GUY	Sean Cameron
18	MF	USA	Gerson Mayen
19	MF	USA	Steven Cabas
20	FW	CRC	Bryan Pérez
21	MF	USA	Brian Shriver
22	DF	USA	Aaron Hohlbein
23	FW	USA	Bryan Dominguez
24	GK	USA	Matt Glaeser
27	DF	ENG	Martyn Lancaster
31	FW	BRA	Paulo Araujo Jr.
40	GK	AUS	Caleb Patterson-Sewell
77	FW	USA	Chukwudi Chijindu

=== Staff ===
Head Coach: (Nicaragua) Victor Pastora
Assistant Coach: (Brazil) Marcelo Neveleff
Goalkeeper Coach: (Brazil) Ricardo Lopes
Director of Soccer: (United States) Fernando Clavijo
General Manager: (Brazil) Luiz Muzzi

== Competitive ==
=== Preseason ===
March 6, 2010 Friendly	Florida International University	1–3	Miami FC	FIU Stadium, Miami
10:00 EDT		(Report)

March 12, 2010 Friendly	Miami FC	1–3	New York Red Bulls	Lockhart Stadium, Fort Lauderdale
11:30 EDT	Santeliz	(Report)	Ibrahim; Chinn

March 14, 2010 Friendly	Miami FC	3–0	Lynn University	Lockhart Stadium, Fort Lauderdale
10:00 EDT		(Report)

March 20, 2010 Friendly	Barry University	0–4	Miami FC	Buccaneer Field, Miami Shores
19:00 EDT		(Report)

March 21, 2010 Friendly	Soccer Locker	1–5	Miami FC	Kendall Soccer Park, West Kendall
16:00 EDT		(Report)

March 28, 2010 Friendly	Florida Gulf Coast University	0–1	Miami FC	FGCU Soccer Complex, Fort Myers
18:00 EDT		(Report)	Santeliz

April 2, 2010 Friendly	Miami FC	4–0	Saint Thomas University	Sunrise Soccer Complex, Sunrise
17:00 EDT	Thompson; Santeliz; Shriver	(Report)

April 3, 2010 Friendly	Honduras Five Stars	1–2	Miami FC	Kendall Soccer Park, West Kendall
14:00 EDT		(Report)

=== Regular season ===
April 10, 2010 Week 1	Miami	1–1	Rochester	Lockhart Stadium, Fort Lauderdale
19:30 EDT	Santeliz (yellow card) 45'; Paulo Araujo 47'	Report	21' Heins; (yellow card) 83' Aguilar	Attendance: 1,235; Referee: Tony Russo

April 17, 2010 Week 2	Miami	0–0	Vancouver	Lockhart Stadium, Fort Lauderdale
19:30 EDT		Report	(yellow card) 33' Tsiskaridze; (yellow card) 63' Janicki	Attendance: 1,089; Referee: Javier Santos

May 1, 2010 Week 3	Miami	1–1	Tampa Bay	Lockhart Stadium, Fort Lauderdale
19:30 EDT	Thompson (yellow card) 35'; Gómez 40' (red card) 48'; Veris (yellow card) 58'	Report	(yellow card) 14' Yamada; 82' Valentin	Attendance: 1,502

May 8, 2010 Week 4	Miami	1–1	Carolina	Lockhart Stadium, Fort Lauderdale
19:30 EDT	Gbandi (yellow card) 38'; Thompson 48'; Dominguez (yellow card) 84'; Santeliz (yellow card) 87'	Report	(yellow card) 78' (yellow-red card) 78' Gilkerson; 83' Gardner	Attendance: 1,014

May 15, 2010 Week 5	Minnesota	1–1	Miami	National Sports Center, Baine
19:00 EDT	Menyongar 56'; Gumede (yellow card) 75'; Clements (yellow card) 83'	Report	73' Paulo Araujo	Attendance: 1,576

May 22, 2010 Week 6	Miami	1–0	Minnesota	Lockhart Stadium, Fort Lauderdale
19:30 EDT	Paulo Araujo 71'; Rodrigues (yellow card); Cabas (yellow card)	Report	(yellow card) Arango	Attendance: 1,793

May 26, 2010 Week 7	Miami	1–3	Austin	Lockhart Stadium, Fort Lauderdale
19:30 EDT	Paulo Araujo 39'; Veris (yellow card) 50'	Report	10' Alvarez; (yellow card) 17' Saduka; 27' (o.g.) Veris; 39' Johnson; (yellow card) 82' Watson; (yellow card) 82' Callahan	Attendance: 1,014

June 2, 2010 Week 8	Puerto Rico	4–2	Miami	Juan Ramón Loubriel Stadium, Bayamón
21:05 EDT	Hansen 47'; Addlery 57'; Foley 67'; Nurse 85'; Rivera (yellow card)	Report	46' Gómez; (yellow card) Dias; 87' Shriver	Attendance: 2,642

June 6, 2010 Week 9	Montreal	1–1	Miami	Saputo Stadium, Montreal
14:00 EDT	Donatelli 23' (pen.); Placentino (yellow card) 85'; Aâboubou (yellow card) 90'	Report	9' Gómez; (yellow card) 52' Cameron; (yellow card) 60' Lancaster; (yellow card) 75' Ariel	Attendance: 13,034; Referee: David Barrie

June 9, 2010 Week 10	Miami	3–3	Baltimore	Lockhart Stadium, Fort Lauderdale
19:30 EDT	Shriver 21'; Dias (yellow card); Lancaster (yellow card); Germiniani 83'; Gómez 89'	Report	2' 47' Patterson; (yellow card) Robson; 80' Gonzaga; (yellow card) Veeder	Attendance: 1,017

June 12, 2010 Week 11	Miami	1–0	Portland	Lockhart Stadium, Fort Lauderdale
19:30 EDT	Veris 26'	Report		Attendance: 1,004

June 19, 2010 Week 12	Austin	3–1	Miami	House Park, Austin
19:30 EDT	M. Griffin 23' 65' 87'; Silva (red card) 60'; Marshall (yellow card) 68'; Sakuda (yellow card) 82'	Report	25' Paulo Araujo; (yellow card) 37' Veris; (yellow card) 48' Rodrigues; (red card) 60' Cameron; (yellow card) 67' Arguez	Attendance: 2,143

June 26, 2010 Week 13	Miami	1–2	Austin	Lockhart Stadium, Fort Lauderdale
19:30 EDT	Paulo Araujo 86'; Veris (yellow card) 90'	Report	44' 88' (pen.) Johnson; (red card) 84' L. Griffin	Attendance: 1,148

July 4, 2010 Week 14	Tampa Bay	1–1	Miami	George M. Steinbrenner Field, Tampa
16:00 EDT	Burt (yellow card) 75'; Christie 82'	Report	(yellow card) 47' Rodrigues; (yellow card) 64' Dias; 90' Santeliz	Attendance: 5,123

July 10, 2010 Week 15	Portland	2–0	Miami	PGE Park, Portland
19:00 EDT	Smith 48'; Pore (yellow card) (goal) 90'	Report	(yellow card) Veris; (yellow card) Cabas	Attendance: 12,189

July 14, 2010 Week 16	Vancouver	3–1	Miami	Swangard Stadium, Burnaby, Canada
19:30 EDT	Wagner 18' 56' 90+1' (yellow card) 90+1'; Tsiskaridze (yellow card) 35'	Report	(yellow card) 15' Veris; (yellow card) 38' Gómez; 57' Shriver	Attendance: 5,024

July 17, 2010 Week 17	Miami	1–1	Puerto Rico	Lockhart Stadium, Fort Lauderdale
19:30 EDT	Veris (yellow card); Paulo Araujo 90'	Report	33' Addlery; (yellow card) Foley; (yellow card) Gbandi; (yellow card) Nurse	Attendance: 1,480

July 25, 2010 Week 18	Tampa Bay	2–0	Miami	George M. Steinbrenner Field, Tampa
16:00 EDT	Valentin 36'; Dohono (yellow card) 58'; King 66'; Tatters (yellow card) 78'	Report	(yellow card) 86' Santeliz	Attendance: 3,226

July 31, 2010 Week 19	Austin	3–1	Miami	House Park, Austin
19:30 EDT	Johnson 44' (yellow card) 59'; Olum 47'; McFayden (yellow card) 78' (goal) 90'; Alvarez (yellow card) 80'	Report	(yellow card) 31' Cameron; (yellow card) 64' Dominguez; 75' Thompson; (yellow card) 90' Gbandi	Attendance: 3,228

August 4, 2010 Week 20	Baltimore	0–1	Miami	UMBC Stadium, Baltimore
19:00 EDT	Lader (yellow card) 44'	Report	70' Shriver; (yellow card) 90' Lancaster	Attendance: 507; Referee: Sorin Stoica

August 7, 2010 Week 21	Puerto Rico	1–1	Miami	Juan Ramón Loubriel Stadium, Bayamón
21:05 EDT	Faña; Hansen (yellow card); Rivera (yellow card); Addlery (yellow card)	Report	Thompson; (yellow card) Paulo Araujo; (yellow card) Gómez; (yellow card) (yellow-red card) Gbandi	Attendance: 3,223

August 14, 2010 Week 22	Miami	3–3	Tampa Bay	Lockhart Stadium, Fort Lauderdale
19:30 EDT	Chijindu 19'; Martins 42'; Nunez 82'	Report	33' Galindo; 45' (o.g.) Mayen; 56' King	Attendance: 1,855

August 18, 2010 Week 23	Carolina	2–1	Miami	WakeMed Soccer Park, Cary
19:00 EDT	Watson (yellow card) 30'; Paladini (yellow card) 62'; Richardson 71'; Barbara 74'; Shields (yellow card) 84'	Report	49' Paulo Araujo; (yellow card) 68' Lennon; (yellow card) 85' Gómez; (yellow card) 90' Cameron	Attendance: 1,426

August 21, 2010 Week 24	Rochester	3–1	Miami	Marina Auto Stadium, Rochester
19:00 EDT	Hoxie 42' 73'; Roberts 52'; Pitchkolan (yellow card) 63'; Bellamy (yellow card) 89'	Report	50' Martins; (yellow card) 69' Lennon; (yellow card) 73' Rodrigues; (yellow card) 83' Hohlbein	Attendance: 9,157

September 5, 2010 Week 25	St. Louis	3–1	Miami	Anheuser-Busch Center, Fenton
17:00 EDT	Kreamalmeyer 19'; Traynor (yellow card) 58'; Ambersley 70'; Lancaster 75' (o.g.); Videira (yellow card) 85'	Report	(yellow card) 45' Gómez; 63' (yellow card) 62' Thompson	Attendance: 2,403

September 11, 2010 Week 26	Miami	2–1	Montreal	Lockhart Stadium, Fort Lauderdale
19:30 EDT	Gómez 44'; Celestino (yellow card) 31'; Thompson 76'	Report	(yellow card) 18' Testo; (yellow card) 28' Pizzolitto; 70' Sebrango	Attendance: 1,106

September 17, 2010 Week 27	Rochester	1–2	Miami	Marina Auto Stadium, Rochester
19:30 EDT	Hamilton 10' (Rosenlund)	Report	Martins-Teixeira 17' (Thompson); Thompson 24'	Attendance: 6,794

September 22, 2010 Week 28	Miami	4–2	St. Louis	Lockhart Stadium, Fort Lauderdale
19:30 EDT	Thompson 43' (Le Petit), 57', 60' (Neto); Le Petit 73'	Report	Stisser 69', 83' (Kreamalmeyer)	Attendance: 742

September 25, 2010 Week 29	Miami	1–0	Rochester	Lockhart Stadium, Fort Lauderdale
19:30 EDT	Gómez 90' (Martins-Teixeira)	Report		Attendance: 1,126

October 2, 2010 Week 30	Miami	1–1	Puerto Rico	Lockhart Stadium, Fort Lauderdale
19:30 EDT	Gómez 40'	Report	Horst 12'	Attendance: 1,684

=== U.S. Open Cup ===
June 15, 2010 First Round	Miami	5–1 (a.e.t.)	Central Florida	Central Broward Regional Park, Lauderhill
19:30 EDT	Rodrigues 3'; Paulo Araujo 110' 112' 113' 119'	Report	57' Millar

June 22, 2010 Second Round	Miami	2–1 (a.e.t.)	Tampa Bay	Lockhart Stadium, Fort Lauderdale
19:30 EDT	Paulo Araujo 2'; Kirby (yellow card) 22'; Thompson (yellow card) 61' (goal) 98' (pen.); Arguez (yellow card) 85'	Report	(yellow card) 32' (goal) 82' Diaz; (yellow card) 58' Nyazamba; (yellow card) 79' Valentino; (yellow card) 110' Burt	Attendance: 972

June 29, 2010 Round of 16	Houston	1–0	Miami	Carl Lewis International Complex, Houston
19:30 CDT	Palmer 80'	Report	(yellow card) 47' Kirby; (yellow card) 66' (yellow-red card) 83' Rodrigues	Attendance: 832; Referee: Chris Penso
