= 2010 Carolina RailHawks FC season =

Carolina RailHawks FC
2010 season
- Chairman: Brian Wellman; Selby Wellman; Bob Young
- Manager: Martin Rennie
- USSF Division 2: NASL Conference Champions
- U.S. Open Cup: Second Round
- Highest home attendance: 2,879
- Lowest home attendance: 1,426
- Average home league attendance: 2,241
Home colours	Away colours

The 2010 Carolina Railhawks FC season was the fourth season of the franchise, which was played in the temporary USSF Division 2 Pro League.

== Conference table ==
NASL Conference
Pos	Team	Pld	W	L	T	GF	GA	GD	Pts	Qualification
1	Carolina RailHawks FC	30	13	9	8	44	32	+12	47	Conference leader, qualified for playoffs
2	Vancouver Whitecaps FC	30	10	5	15	32	22	+10	45	Qualified for playoffs (Note: The remaining six teams with the highest point totals, regardless of conference, also advance to the playoffs.)
3	Montreal Impact	30	12	11	7	36	30	+6	43	Qualified for playoffs
4	Miami FC	30	7	11	12	37	49	−12	33	
5	AC St. Louis	30	7	15	8	32	48	−16	29	
6	Crystal Palace Baltimore	30	6	18	6	24	55	−31	24	

Source: USSF D-2 schedule table

== Players ==
Note: Flags indicate national team as defined under FIFA eligibility rules; some limited exceptions apply. Players may hold more than one non-FIFA nationality.

No.	Pos.	Nation	Player
0	GK	USA	Sean O'Connor
2	DF	SCO	Greg Shields
3	MF	USA	Kupono Low
4	DF	USA	Matt Bobo
5	MF	USA	Floyd Franks
6	MF	USA	Josh Gardner
7	FW	MLT	Etienne Barbara
8	MF	ENG	Matthew Watson
9	FW	SLE	Sallieu Bundu
10	MF	USA	Brian Plotkin
11	MF	USA	Daniel Paladini
12	GK	USA	Nicolas Platter

No.	Pos.	Nation	Player
13	DF	USA	Mark Schulte (captain)
14	DF	USA	Caleb Norkus
15	DF	USA	John Gilkerson
17	MF	ZIM	Joseph Kabwe
18	MF	JPN	Jun Marques Davidson
20	FW	GUY	Gregory Richardson
22	DF	IRN	Ramak Safi
23	GK	USA	Eric Reed
24	DF	USA	Brad Rusin
25	DF	USA	Amir Lowery
33	FW	UKR	Andriy Budnyi
—	FW	GAM	Sainey Touray

=== Transfers ===
OUT

IN: Tommy Heinemann (loan from Charleston Battery, Sept-Oct 2010); Claudio Suárez (exhibition guest appearance 9/5/2010); Allan Russell (7/23/2010); Ty Shipalane (6/1/2010); David Hayes (5/12/2010)

== Match results ==
Win Tie Loss

== Preseason ==
February 20, 2010	Carolina RailHawks FC (North Carolina)	3- 2	(North Carolina) Duke Blue Devils	Apex, North Carolina, United States
				Stadium: Middle Creek Park

February 27, 2010	Carolina RailHawks FC (North Carolina)	2- 1	(North Carolina) Wake Forest Demon Deacons	Cary, North Carolina, United States
				Stadium: WakeMed Soccer Park

March 20, 2010	Carolina RailHawks FC (North Carolina)	1- 2	(Massachusetts) New England Revolution	Cary, North Carolina, United States
7:00 PM	Schulte 85' Safi (yellow card) 90'		Phelan 41' Schilawski 87'	Stadium: WakeMed Soccer Park

March 27, 2010	Carolina RailHawks FC (North Carolina)	1- 1	(Quebec) Montreal Impact	Cary, North Carolina, United States
7:00 PM	Low 69' Paladini (yellow card) 58' Lowery (yellow card) 72' Budnyy (yellow card) 75'		Pizzolitto 82'	Stadium: WakeMed Soccer Park

April 3, 2010	Charleston Battery (South Carolina)	1- 2	(North Carolina) Carolina RailHawks FC	Charleston, South Carolina, United States
			Schulte Gardner	Stadium: Blackbaud Stadium

== USSF Division 2 Professional League Regular Season ==
April 10, 2010	Carolina RailHawks FC (North Carolina)	2- 0	(Missouri) AC St. Louis	Cary, North Carolina, United States
7:00 PM	Barbara 4', 25' Gardner (yellow card) 75'	Report	Kante (yellow card) 63'	Stadium: WakeMed Soccer Park; Attendance: 2,013

April 16, 2010	Carolina RailHawks FC (North Carolina)	0- 1	NSC Minnesota Stars	Cary, North Carolina, United States
7:00 PM		Report	Wasson 37' Wasson (yellow card) 47' Bracalello (yellow card) 70'	Stadium: WakeMed Soccer Park; Attendance: 1,694

May 1, 2010	Rochester Rhinos (New York (state))	1- 1	(North Carolina) Carolina RailHawks FC	Rochester, New York, United States
7:30 PM	Roberts 9' J.Franks (yellow card)		Barbara 56' (p.k.) Lowery (yellow card)	Stadium: Marina Auto Stadium; Attendance: 7,124; Referee: Zachary Rubinich

May 7, 2010	Miami FC (Florida)	1- 1	(North Carolina) Carolina RailHawks FC	Ft. Lauderdale, Florida, United States
7:30 PM	Thompson 48' Gbandi (yellow card) 38' Dominguez (yellow card) 84' Santeliz (yellow card) 87' Patterson-Sewell (yellow card)		Gardner 83' Gilkerson (red card) 78'	Stadium: Lockhart Stadium; Attendance: 1,013

May 14, 2010	Carolina RailHawks FC (North Carolina)	1- 2	(Florida) FC Tampa Bay	Cary, North Carolina, United States
7:00 PM	Richardson 43' Franks (yellow card) 60'		Donoho 61' Wheeler (yellow card) 79' (goal) 84' Kljestan (yellow card) 52'	Stadium: WakeMed Soccer Park; Attendance: 2,641

May 26, 2010	Puerto Rico Islanders	1- 2	(North Carolina) Carolina RailHawks FC	Bayamón, Puerto Rico
8:05 PM	Foley 73' Jagdeosingh (yellow card) 45' Vélez (yellow card) 67' Nurse (yellow card) 70' Horst (red card) 90'		Bundu 5' Paladini 90+' Bobo (yellow card) 67'	Stadium: Juan Ramón Loubriel Stadium; Attendance: 5,077

May 30, 2010	Montreal Impact (Quebec)	0- 2	(North Carolina) Carolina RailHawks FC	Montreal, Quebec, Canada
2:00 PM	Pastel (yellow card) 78'		Barbara 20' Barbara (yellow card) 40' Gardner (yellow card) 76' Budnyy 90' Budnyy (yellow card) 90'	Stadium: Saputo Stadium; Attendance: 13,034; Referee: Alain Ruch

June 6, 2010	Portland Timbers (Oregon)	1- 1	(North Carolina) Carolina RailHawks FC	Portland, Oregon, United States
9:00 PM	Pore 61'		Paladini 90+'	Stadium: PGE Park

June 9, 2010	Vancouver Whitecaps FC (British Columbia)	1- 1	(North Carolina) Carolina RailHawks FC	Burnaby, British Columbia, Canada
10:50 PM	Toure 31' Stewart (yellow card) 26' Janicki (yellow card) 43' Tsiskaridze (yellow card) 85'		Barbara 45' (p.k.) Lowery (yellow card) 41'	Stadium: Swangard Stadium

June 18, 2010	Carolina RailHawks FC (North Carolina)	1- 1	(Maryland) Crystal Palace Baltimore	Cary, North Carolina, United States
7:00 PM	Franks 51' (p.k.) Shields (yellow card) 71' Paladini (yellow card) 90'		Bobo 22' (o.g.) Robson (yellow card) 17' Mbuta (yellow card) 30' Fusiller (yellow card) 43' Gonzaga (yellow card) 50' Lader (yellow card) 80'	Stadium: WakeMed Soccer Park

June 26, 2010	Carolina RailHawks FC (North Carolina)	2- 2	(Quebec) Montreal Impact	Cary, North Carolina, United States
7:00 PM				Stadium: WakeMed Soccer Park

July 3, 2010	AC St. Louis (Missouri)	0- 2	(North Carolina) Carolina RailHawks FC	Fenton, Missouri, United States
8:10 PM	Traynor (yellow card) 60'		Kabwe 16' (yellow card) 82' Lowery (yellow card) 45' Gardner 62'	Stadium: Anheuser-Busch Center

July 11, 2010	Puerto Rico Islanders	0- 2	(North Carolina) Carolina RailHawks FC	Bayamon, Puerto Rico
7:05 PM			Bundu 18' Gardner 26' Franks (yellow card) 30'	Stadium: Juan Ramon Loubriel Stadium

Montreal Impact (Quebec)	1- 0	(North Carolina) Carolina RailHawks FC	Montreal, Quebec, Canada
			Stadium: Saputo Stadium

Rochester Rhinos (New York (state))	0- 1	(North Carolina) Carolina RailHawks FC	Rochester, New York
			Stadium: Marina Auto Stadium

July 27, 2010	Carolina RailHawks FC (North Carolina)	0- 1	(New York (state)) Rochester Rhinos	Cary, North Carolina
7:00 PM				Stadium: WakeMed Soccer Park

July 31, 2010	Carolina RailHawks FC (North Carolina)	2- 2	(British Columbia) Vancouver Whitecaps FC	Cary, North Carolina
7:00 PM	Schulte 40' Gardner 45' Franks (yellow card) 44' Russell (yellow card) 55'		Nash 2' Davies 15'	Stadium: WakeMed Soccer Park

August 2, 2010	Carolina RailHawks FC (North Carolina)	2- 0	(Quebec) Montreal Impact	Cary, North Carolina, United States
7:00 PM	Gardner 45' Elenio 87' Schulte (yellow card) 63' Barbara (red card) 90'		Leduc (yellow card) 14' Pizzolitto (yellow card) 85' Soares (yellow card) 89' Jordan (yellow card) 90' Braz (yellow card) 90'	Stadium: WakeMed Soccer Park

August 15, 2010	Carolina RailHawks FC (North Carolina)	0- 2	(New York (state)) Rochester Rhinos	Cary, North Carolina
7:00 PM			Rosenlund 15' Heins 79'	Stadium: WakeMed Soccer Park

August 11, 2010	Crystal Palace Baltimore (Maryland)	2- 1	(North Carolina) Carolina RailHawks FC	Baltimore, Maryland
7:00 PM	Yoshitake 21' Brooks 49'		Watson 76'

August 18, 2010	Carolina RailHawks FC (North Carolina)	2- 1	(Florida) Miami FC	Cary, North Carolina
7:00 PM	Richardson 71' Barbara 74' Watson (yellow card) 30' Paladini (yellow card) 62' Shields (yellow card) 84'		Araujo 49' Calestino (yellow card) 69' Gomez (yellow card) 85'	Stadium: WakeMed Soccer Park

August 22, 2010	Austin Aztex FC (Texas)	3- 2	(North Carolina) Carolina RailHawks FC	Austin, Texas, United States
7:00	Johnson 32' Marshall 66' Patterson 81' Olum (yellow card) 53'		Paladini 18' Russell 83' Franks (yellow card) 35'	Stadium: House Park

August 25, 2010	FC Tampa Bay (Florida)	1- 2	(North Carolina) Carolina RailHawks FC	Tampa Bay, Florida, United States
7:00 PM	Ricardo Sanchez 88' Ricardo Sanchez (yellow card) 79' Valentin (yellow card) 86' Galindo (yellow card) 90+'		Bobo 23' Barbara 40' Russell (yellow card) 4' Schulte (yellow card) 64' Paladini (yellow card) 76'	Stadium: George M. Steinbrenner Field

August 28, 2010	Carolina RailHawks FC (North Carolina)	2- 3	Puerto Rico Islanders	Cary, North Carolina, United States
7:00 PM	Paladini 22' 90'		Foley 11' Gbandi 76' Addlery 78' Horst (yellow card) 45' Gaudette (yellow card) 90'	Stadium: WakeMed Soccer Park

September 3, 2010	Carolina RailHawks FC (North Carolina)	3- 0	(Maryland) Crystal Palace Baltimore	Cary, North Carolina, United States
7:00 PM	Paladini 47' Russell 75' (p.k.) Heinemann 89' Rusin (yellow card) 61'		Lader (yellow card) 49' Sanchez (yellow card) 60' Teixeria (yellow card) 75'	Stadium: WakeMed Soccer Park

September 11, 2010	Carolina RailHawks FC (North Carolina)	0- 0	(Oregon) Portland Timbers	Cary, North Carolina, United States
7:00 PM	Heinemann (yellow card) 39'		Muhamadu (yellow card) 14' Dike (yellow card) 66' Suzuki (yellow card) 71'	Stadium: WakeMed Soccer Park

September 15, 2010	NSC Minnesota Stars	1- 0	(North Carolina) Carolina RailHawks FC	Blaine, MN, United States
7:00 PM	Deldo 37'		McKenney (red card) 18' Lowery (red card) 79'	Stadium: National Sports Center

September 15, 2010	Crystal Palace Baltimore (Maryland)	2- 4	(North Carolina) Carolina RailHawks FC	Baltimore, MD, United States
7:00 PM	Pejic 50' Sanchez 58' Murphy (yellow card) 39'		Richardson 9' Davidson 10' Low 13' (p.k.) Heinemann 65' Bobo (yellow card) 24'	Stadium: Paul Angelo Russo Stadium

September 25, 2010	Carolina RailHawks FC (North Carolina)	2- 1	Puerto Rico Islanders	Cary, North Carolina, United States
7:00 PM	Watson 45' Heinemann 47' Davidson (yellow card) 82'		Jagdeosingh 19' Miranda (yellow card) 39' Horst (yellow card) 50'	Stadium: WakeMed Soccer Park

October 1, 2010	Carolina RailHawks FC (North Carolina)	3- 1	(Texas) Austin Aztex	Cary, North Carolina, United States
7:00 PM	Bernard 44' (o.g.) Barbara 84' Heinemann 90' Rusin (yellow card) 39' Barbara (yellow card) 85'		Griffin 45+'	Stadium: WakeMed Soccer Park

== 2010 U.S. Open Cup ==
First Round
USL-2	(South Carolina) Charleston Battery	4
USASA	(North Carolina) CASL Elite	2
D-2	(North Carolina) Carolina RailHawks	1
USL-2	(North Carolina) Charlotte Eagles	0

Second Round
USL-2	(South Carolina) Charleston Battery	2
D-2	(North Carolina) Carolina RailHawks	1

June 15, 2010 First Round	Carolina RailHawks FC (North Carolina)	1- 0	(North Carolina) Charlotte Eagles	WakeMed Soccer Park
7:05 PM	Bundu 23'		Bentos (yellow card) 80' Herrera (yellow card) 86'

June 22, 2010 Second Round	Charleston Battery (South Carolina)	2- 1	(North Carolina) Carolina RailHawks FC	Blackbaud Stadium

== Quarterfinals ==
October 6, 2010	NSC Minnesota Stars	0- 0	(North Carolina) Carolina RailHawks FC	Blaine, MN, United States
7:00 PM			Low (yellow card) 61'	Stadium: National Sports Center

October 9, 2010	Carolina RailHawks FC (North Carolina)	4- 0	NSC Minnesota Stars	Cary, NC, United States
7:00 PM	Paladini 64' (yellow card) 65' Gardner 71' Lowery 84' (yellow card) 56' Kallman 87' (o.g.) Heinemann (yellow card) 38'		Arango (yellow card) 37' (red card) 38'	Stadium: WakeMed Soccer Park

RailHawks advance 4–0 on aggregate

== Semifinals ==
October 14, 2010	Montreal Impact (Quebec)	1- 0	(North Carolina) Carolina RailHawks FC	Montreal, Quebec, Canada
7:30 PM	Di Lorenzo 35' Ribeiro (yellow card) 23' Billy (yellow card) 56'		Davidson (yellow card) 13' Lowery (yellow card) 44' Paladini (yellow card) 53' Rusin (yellow card) 84'	Stadium: Stade Saputo

October 17, 2010	Carolina RailHawks FC (North Carolina)	2- 0	(Quebec) Montreal Impact	Cary, NC, United States
6:00 PM				Stadium: WakeMed Soccer Park

RailHawks advance 2–1 on aggregate.

== Mid-season friendlies ==
April 25, 2010	Carolina RailHawks FC (North Carolina)	1- 1	Mexico U-21	Cary, North Carolina, United States
7:00 PM	Budnyy 45' Gardner (yellow card) 56' Rusin (yellow card) 66' Hayes (yellow card) 76'	Report	Schulte 53'(o.g.) Iazola (yellow card) 36' Trejo (yellow card) 45'	Stadium: WakeMed Soccer Park

September 5, 2010	Carolina RailHawks FC (North Carolina)	3- 0	(Mexico) Pumas Morelos	Cary, North Carolina, United States
5:00 PM	Gardner 28' Elenio 34' Safi 84' Davidson (yellow card) 39'		Medina (yellow card) 45' Santana (red card) 90'	Stadium: WakeMed Soccer Park
