= 2010 in American soccer =

Soccer in the United States
- Season: 2010

Men's soccer
- Supporters' Shield: Los Angeles Galaxy
- USSF D2 Pro League: Puerto Rico Islanders
- USL Second Division: Charleston Battery
- NPSL: Sacramento Gold
- PDL: Portland Timbers U23s
- U.S. Open Cup: Seattle Sounders FC
- MLS Cup: Colorado Rapids

The 2010 Season was the 98th season of competitive soccer in the United States.

== National teams ==
The home team or the team that is designated as the home team is listed in the left column; the away team is in the right column.

Win Draw Loss

=== Men ===
==== Senior ====
===== Friendly matches =====
January 23	United States	1–3	Honduras	Carson, California
18:00 UTC−08	Conrad (yellow card) 6' (yellow-red card) 17'; Goodson 69'	Report	Pavón 19' (pen.); J. Palacios (yellow card) 9', (goal) 37'; Espinoza 52'; Guevara (yellow card) 50'	Stadium: Home Depot Center; Attendance: 18,626; Referee: Benito Archundia (Mexico)

February 24	United States	2–1	El Salvador	Tampa, Florida
19:00 UTC−05	Ching 74'; Kljestan 90'; Pearce 85'	Report	Corrales 59'	Stadium: Raymond James Stadium; Attendance: 21,737; Referee: Silviu Petrescu (Canada)

March 3	Netherlands	2–1	United States	Amsterdam, Netherlands
20:45 UTC+01	De Jong (yellow card) 31'; Kuyt 40' (pen.); Huntelaar 73'; Braafheid (yellow card) 90'	Report	Torres (yellow card) 31'; Bocanegra 88'	Stadium: Amsterdam Arena; Attendance: 46,000; Referee: Cüneyt Çakır (Turkey)

May 25	United States	2–4	Czech Republic	East Hartford, Connecticut
20:00 UTC−05	Edu 17'; Gomez 66'	Report	Sivok 44'; Polák 58'; Fenin 78'; Necid 90'	Stadium: Rentschler Field; Attendance: 36,218; Referee: Mauricio Morales (Mexico)

May 29	United States	2–1	Turkey	Philadelphia, Pennsylvania
14:00 UTC−05	Altidore 58'; Dempsey 75'	Report	Turan 27'	Stadium: Lincoln Financial Field; Attendance: 55,407; Referee: Silviu Petrescu (Canada)

June 5	Australia	1–3	United States	Roodepoort, South Africa
14:30 UTC+02	Cahill 19'	Report	Buddle 4', 31'; Gomez 90+3'	Stadium: Ruimsig Stadium; Attendance: 6,000; Referee: Abdul Ebrahim (South Africa)

August 10	United States	0–2	Brazil	East Rutherford, New Jersey
20:00 UTC−04		Report	Neymar 28'; Pato 45+1'	Stadium: New Meadowlands Stadium; Attendance: 77,223; Referee: Sylviu Petrescu (Canada)

October 9	United States	2–2	Poland	Chicago, Illinois
19:00 UTC−06	Altidore 13'; Onyewu 52'	Report	Matuszczyk 28'; Błaszczykowski 73'	Stadium: Soldier Field; Attendance: 31,696; Referee: Steven DePiero (Canada)

October 12	United States	0–0	Colombia	Chester, Pennsylvania
20:00 UTC−05		Report		Stadium: PPL Park; Attendance: 8,823; Referee: Roberto Garcia (Mexico)

November 17	South Africa	0–1	United States	Cape Town, South Africa
21:30 UTC+02		Report	Agudelo 85'	Stadium: Cape Town Stadium; Attendance: 52,000; Referee: Sylvester Kirwa (Kenya)

===== 2010 FIFA World Cup =====
For the 2010 FIFA World Cup, the United States men's national team was drawn into, and emerged victorious from, Group C.

June 12 Group stage	England	1–1	United States	Rustenburg, South Africa
20:30 UTC+02	Gerrard 5'	Report	Dempsey 40'	Stadium: Royal Bafokeng Stadium; Attendance: 38,646; Referee: Carlos Eugênio Simon (Brazil); Assistant referees: Roberto Braatz (Brazil); Altemir Hausmann (Brazil); Fourth official: Eddy Maillet (Seychelles)

June 18 Group stage	Slovenia	2–2	United States	Johannesburg, South Africa
16:00 UTC+02	Birsa 13'; Ljubijankić 42'	Report	Donovan 48'; Bradley 82'	Stadium: Ellis Park Stadium; Attendance: 45,573; Referee: Koman Coulibaly (Mali); Assistant referees: Redouane Achik (Morocco); Inacio Candido (Angola); Fourth official: Subkhiddin Mohd Salleh (Malaysia)

June 23 Group stage	United States	1–0	Algeria	Pretoria, South Africa
16:00 UTC+02	Donovan 90+1'	Report		Stadium: Loftus Versfeld Stadium; Attendance: 35,827; Referee: Frank De Bleeckere (Belgium); Assistant referees: Peter Hermans (Belgium); Walter Vromans (Belgium); Fourth official: Subkhiddin Mohd Salleh (Malaysia)

June 26 Round of 16	United States	1–2 (a.e.t.)	Ghana	Rustenburg, South Africa
20:30 UTC+02	Donovan 62' (pen.)	Report	Boateng 5'; Gyan 93'	Stadium: Royal Bafokeng Stadium; Attendance: 34,976; Referee: Viktor Kassai (Hungary); Assistant referees: Gabor Eros (Hungary); Tibor Vamos (Hungarian Football Federation); Fourth official: Michael Hester (New Zealand)

==== Under-20 ====
Copa Chivas

January 22 Group stage	Pachuca Youth (Mexico)	3–1	United States U-20	Guadalajara, Mexico
	Mora 10'; Castillo 26'; Meraz 45'	Report	Gil 25'

January 23 Group stage	United States U-20	1–1	Brazil U-20	Guadalajara, Mexico
	Agudelo 55'	Report	Lucas 48'

January 24 Group stage	Tigres UANL Youth (Mexico)	1–0	United States U-20	Guadalajara, Mexico
	Orozco 72'	Report

January 26 Group stage	United States U-20	1–1	(Mexico) Atlas Youth	Guadalajara, Mexico
	Chavez 69'	Report	Rivira 62'

January 27 Group stage	Saprissa Youth (Mexico)	1–0	United States U-20	Guadalajara, Mexico
	Campbell 39' (pen.)	Report

Dallas Cup

The United States U-20 team participated in the "Super Group" at the 2010 Dallas Cup.

March 28 Group stage	United States U-20	0–1	Mexico U-20	Frisco, Texas
19:00 UTC−05		Report	Guarch 48'	Stadium: Pizza Hut Park

March 29 Group stage	United States U-20	1–0	(Canada) Vancouver Whitecaps FC	Frisco, Texas
14:00 UTC−05	Orozco 1'	Report		Stadium: Pizza Hut Park

March 31 Group stage	United States U-20	0–1	(Germany) Eintracht Frankfurt	Frisco, Texas
18:30 UTC−05		Report	Tosun 45'	Stadium: Pizza Hut Park

Milk Cup

July 26 Group stage	United States U-20	1–0	China PR U-20	Ballymena, Northern Ireland
20:00 UTC	Salgado 18'	Report		Stadium: Ballymena Showgrounds

July 28 Group stage	Denmark U-19	2–3	United States U-20	Coleraine, Northern Ireland
20:00 UTC	Nielsen 27'; 85' (o.g.)	Report	Ruelas 30', 89'; Ibrahim 74'	Stadium: Coleraine Showgrounds

July 30 Final	United States U-20	3–0	Northern Ireland U-19	Ballymena, Northern Ireland
18:00 UTC	Agbossoumonde 24'; Agudelo 43'; Ruelas 68'	Report		Stadium: Ballymena Showgrounds

Torneo de las Américas

November 26	United States U-20	1–1	Colombia U-20	Kennesaw, Georgia
3:30 UTC−05	Zahavi 45+3'	Report	Castillo 86'	Stadium: Kennesaw State University Soccer Stadium

November 28	United States U-20	1–1	Mexico U-20	Kennesaw, Georgia
3:30 UTC−05	Agbossoumonde 70'	Report	Guarch 24'	Stadium: Kennesaw State University Soccer Stadium

==== Under-17 ====
February 24	United States U-17	4–1	Mexico U-17	Tampa Bay, Florida
16:15 UTC−05	Gulley 25', 54'; Guido 39' (pen.); Pelosi 70' (pen.)	Report	Jorge Espericueta 51' (pen.)	Stadium: Raymond James Stadium; Referee: Chris Penso (United States); Assistant referees: Eric Proctor (United States); Brian Poeschel (United States); Fourth official: Robert Mauws (United States)

Nike International friendlies

December 1	United States U-17	2–1	Korea Republic U-17	Phoenix, Arizona
16:00 UTC−07	Dunn 7'; Rodriguez 37'	Report	Shin Il Soo 40'	Stadium: Reach 11 Sports Complex

December 3	United States U-17	0–0	Brazil U-17	Phoenix, Arizona
16:00 UTC−07		Report		Stadium: Reach 11 Sports Complex

December 5	United States U-17	0–2	Turkey U-17	Phoenix, Arizona
16:00 UTC−07		Report	Calik 17'; Sahin 71'	Stadium: Reach 11 Sports Complex

=== Women ===
==== Senior ====
Algarve Cup

The United States women won the 2010 Algarve Cup, their seventh title at the annual tournament.

February 24 Group B	United States	2–0	Iceland	Vila Real de Santo António
15:00 WET/UTC±0	Sif 60' (o.g.); Cheney 62'	Report		Stadium: Municipal Stadium; Referee: Christine Bek (Germany); Assistant referees: Marina Wozniak (Germany); Inka Mueller (Germany); Fourth official: Fadouma Dia (Senegal)

February 26 Group B	Norway	1–2	United States	Olhão
15:00 WET/UTC±0	Herlovsen 64'	Report	Wambach 13', 90+2'	Stadium: José Arcanjo Stadium; Referee: Sung Mi Cha (South Korea); Assistant referees: Suel Gi Lee (South Korea); Saori Takahashi (Japan); Fourth official: Jia Wang (China)

March 1 Group B	United States	2–0	Sweden	Ferreiras
15:00 WET/UTC±0	Cheney 57', 87'	Report		Stadium: Desportivo da Nora Park; Referee: Efthalia Mitsi (Greece); Assistant referees: Lada Rojc (Croatia); Natalie Walker (England); Fourth official: Siliva Reyes Juarez (Peru)

March 3 Final	Germany	2–3	United States	Faro
16:00 WET/UTC±0	Grings 41', 74'	Report	Lloyd 18'; Wambach 22'; Cheney 69'	Stadium: Estádio Algarve; Attendance: 1,200; Referee: Kirsi Heikkinen (Finland); Assistant referees: Tonja Paavola (Finland); Anu Jokela (Finland); Fourth official: Quetzalli Godinez (Mexico)

Friendly matches

March 28	United States	3–0	Mexico	San Diego, California
14:00 PDT/UTC−7	Rodriguez 12'; Boxx 43'; Cheney 72'	Report		Stadium: Torero Stadium; Attendance: 3,069; Referee: Kari Seitz (United States); Assistant referees: Marlene Duffy (United States); Shelley Finger (United States); Fourth official: Felisha Mariscal (United States)

March 31	United States	1–0	Mexico	Sandy, Utah
19:00 MDT/UTC−6	Wambach 60'	Report		Stadium: Rio Tinto Stadium; Attendance: 3,732; Referee: Jennifer Bennett (United States); Assistant referees: Verónica Pérez (United States); Deborah Coleman (United States); Fourth official: Karen Abt (United States)

May 22	United States	4–0	Germany	Cleveland
18:00 EDT/UTC−4	Wambach 29' (pen.), 63'; O'Reilly 35'; Lilly 62'	Report		Stadium: Cleveland Browns Stadium; Attendance: 10,321; Referee: Margaret Domka (United States); Assistant referees: Deborah Coleman (United States); Marlene Duffy (United States); Fourth official: Michelle Cowman (United States)

July 13	United States	1–1	Sweden	Omaha, Nebraska
20:00 CDT/UTC−5	Rodriguez 44'	Report	Forsberg 57'	Stadium: Morrison Stadium; Attendance: 6,493; Referee: Felisha Mariscal (United States); Assistant referees: Deborah Coleman (United States); Jason François (United States); Fourth official: Jennifer Bennett (United States)

July 17	United States	3–0	Sweden	East Hartford, Connecticut
19:30 EDT/UTC−4	Rapinoe 33'; Wambach 45+1', 72'	Report		Stadium: Rentschler Field; Attendance: 5,887; Referee: Michelle Cowman (United States); Assistant referees: Deborah Coleman (United States); Kellee Walsh (United States); Fourth official: Dan Arques (United States)

October 2	United States	2–1	China	Kennesaw, Georgia
18:00 EDT/UTC−4	Rapinoe 21'; O'Reilly 37'	Report	Shanshan 33'	Stadium: KSU Soccer Stadium; Attendance: 4,759; Referee: Meredith Hackett (United States); Assistant referees: Melanie Johnson (United States); Patrick Baker (United States); Fourth official: Amy Mahan (United States)

October 6	United States	1–1	China	Chester, Pennsylvania
19:00 EDT/UTC−4	Morgan 83'	Report	Jun 37'	Stadium: PPL Park; Attendance: 2,505; Referee: Margaret Domka (United States); Assistant referees: Deborah Coleman (United States); Ross Kleinstauber (United States); Fourth official: Emilie Buse (United States)

2010 CONCACAF Women's Gold Cup

October 28 Group B	United States	5–0	Haiti	Cancún, Mexico
20:30 EDT/UTC−4	Buehler 9'; Wambach 15', 45+1', 62'; Rodriguez 40'	Report		Stadium: Estadio Quintana Roo; Attendance: 2,500; Referee: Carol Ann Chenard (Canada); Assistant referees: Cindy Mohammed (Trinidad and Tobago); Dianne Ferreira James (Guyana); Fourth official: Shane De Silva (Trinidad and Tobago)

October 30 Group B	United States	9–0	Guatemala	Cancún, Mexico
20:30 EDT/UTC−4	Rodriguez 21', 45+1', 88'; Rapinoe 22', 40'; Wambach 29', 31'; Morgan 50'; Lloyd 56' (pen.)	Report		Stadium: Estadio Quintana Roo; Attendance: 1,050; Referee: Shane De Silva (Trinidad and Tobago); Assistant referees: Cindy Mohammed (Trinidad and Tobago); Jacqueline Sáez (Panama); Fourth official: Caradella Samuels (Jamaica)

November 1 Group B	United States	4–0	Costa Rica	Cancún, Mexico
20:30 EDT/UTC−4	Wambach 32' (pen.); Cheney 68'; Averbuch 73'; Morgan 82'	Report		Stadium: Estadio Quintana Roo; Attendance: 502; Referee: Lucila Venegas (Mexico); Assistant referees: Mayte Chavez (Mexico); Jacqueline Sáez (Panama); Fourth official: Quetzalli Alvardo (Mexico)

November 5 Semifinal	United States	1–2	Mexico	Cancún, Mexico
22:00 EDT/UTC−4	Lloyd 25'	Report	Domínguez 3'; Pérez 27'	Stadium: Estadio de Béisbol Beto Ávila; Attendance: 9,000; Referee: Dianne Ferreira James (Guyana); Assistant referees: Ivonne Ayala (El Salvador); Flor Escobar (Guatemala); Fourth official: Carol Ann Chenard (Canada)

November 8 3rd place match	Costa Rica	0–3	United States	Cancún, Mexico
17:00 EDT/UTC−6		Report	Cheney 17'; Wambach 33', 50'	Stadium: Estadio Quintana Roo; Referee: Quetzalli Godinez (Mexico); Assistant referees: Mayte Chavez (Mexico); Elmer Bonilla (El Salvador); Fourth official: Carol Ann Chenard (Canada)

2011 FIFA World Cup qualification (UEFA-CONCACAF play-off)

November 20	Italy	0–1	United States	Padua, Italy
16:30 CET/UTC+1		Report	Morgan 90+4'	Stadium: Stadio Euganeo; Attendance: 5,000; Referee: Silvia Elisabeth Reyes Juárez (Peru); Assistant referees: Mariana Bettina Corbo Odone (Uruguay); Maria Eugenia Rocco (Argentina); Fourth official: Carolina Patricia Gonzales Urruit (Chile)

November 27	United States	1–0	Italy	Bridgeview, Illinois
13:00 CST/UTC−6	Rodriguez 40'	Report		Stadium: Toyota Park; Attendance: 9,508; Referee: Cha Sung Mi (Korea); Assistant referees: Allyson Flynn (Australia); Ho Sarah May Yee (Australia); Fourth official: Hong Eun Ah (Korea)

==== Under-20 ====
2010 CONCACAF Under-20 Women's Championship

The United States women's national under-20 soccer team won the 2010 CONCACAF Under-20 Women's Championship, ...

January 21 Group B	Jamaica U-20	0–6	United States U-20	Guatemala City
16:30		Report	Nairn 9', 71'; Leroux 25', 35'; Noyola 48'; McCarty 83'	Stadium: Estadio Cementos Progreso; Attendance: 393; Referee: Vargas (Costa Rica); Assistant referees: Sáez (Panama); Tzul (Guatemala); Fourth official: Troya (Panama)

January 23 Group B	Trinidad and Tobago U-20	0–4	United States U-20	Guatemala City
16:30		Report	Marlborough 4'; Mewis 22'; Leroux 36', 45'	Stadium: Estadio Cementos Progreso; Attendance: 605; Referee: Troya (Panama); Assistant referees: Sáez (Panama); Tzul (Guatemala); Fourth official: Vargas (Costa Rica)

January 25 Group B	United States U-20	2–1	Mexico U-20	Guatemala City
16:30	DiMartino 14'; Leroux 64'	Report	Garciamendez 90+1'	Stadium: Estadio Cementos Progreso; Attendance: 962; Referee: Ferreira-James (Guyana); Assistant referees: Tzul (Guatemala); Leonardo (Dominican Republic); Fourth official: Rivas (El Salvador)

January 28 Semifinals	United States U-20	2–1	Costa Rica U-20	Guatemala City
13:30	Mewis 60'; Noyola 71'	Report	Cedeño 77'	Stadium: Estadio Cementos Progreso; Attendance: 629; Referee: Troya (Panama); Assistant referees: Sáez (Panama); Tzul (Guatemala); Fourth official: Ferreira-James (Guyana)

January 30 Final	United States U-20	1–0	Mexico U-20	Guatemala City
16:30	Leroux 87'	Report		Stadium: Estadio Cementos Progreso; Attendance: 1,309; Referee: Rivas (El Salvador); Assistant referees: Pacheco (El Salvador); Sáez (Panama); Fourth official: Ortega (El Salvador)

La Manga Cup

The women's U-20 team also participated in and won the women's portion of the 2010 La Manga Cup. The women's portion of the tournament was conducted as a four-team group stage.

February 22	United States U-20	1–0	Norway U-23	La Manga
	Hayes 53'	Report		Stadium: La Manga Stadium

February 24	United States U-20	1–1	Germany U-23	La Manga
	Leroux 83'	Report	Pressley 90+1' (o.g.)	Stadium: La Manga Stadium

February 26	United States U-20	1–0	England U-23	La Manga
	Leroux 81'	Report		Stadium: La Manga Stadium

Friendly matches

March 15	Florida Gators (United States)	0–3	United States U-20	Gainesville, Florida
7:00 EDT/UTC−04		Report	Brooks 37'; Eddy 50', 52'	Stadium: James G. Pressly Stadium

March 17	United States U-20	2–2	(United States) Boston Breakers	Gainesville, Florida
15:00 EDT/UTC−04	Mewis 18', 57'	Report	Fabiana 32'; Lilly 37'	Stadium: James G. Pressly Stadium

March 19	United States U-20	0–2	(United States) Atlanta Beat	St. Augustine, Florida
15:00 EDT/UTC−04		Report	Bachmann 2', 44'	Stadium: Flagler Field

2010 FIFA Under-20 Women's World Cup

July 14 Group D	United States U-20	1–1	Ghana U-20	Dresden, Germany
18:00 CET/UTC+01	Leroux 70'	Report	Cudjoe 7'	Stadium: Rudolf-Harbig-Stadion; Attendance: 9,430; Referee: Silvia Reyes (Peru); Assistant referees: Maria Luisa Villa Gutierrez (Spain); Yolanda Parga Rodriguez (Spain); Fourth official: Florence Guillemin (France)

July 17 Group D	United States U-20	5–0	Switzerland U-20	Dresden, Germany
18:00 CET/UTC+01	K. Mewis 4'; Leroux 23', 52', 76'; Bywaters 25'	Report		Stadium: Rudolf-Harbig-Stadion; Attendance: 17,234; Referee: Etsuko Fukano (Japan); Assistant referees: Allyson Flynn (Australia); Sarah Ho (Australia); Fourth official: Alexandra Ihringova (England)

July 21 Group D	Korea Republic U-20 (South Korea)	0–1	United States U-20	Bielefeld, Germany
18:00 CET/UTC+01		Report	Leroux 20'	Stadium: Bielefelder Alm; Attendance: 5,420; Referee: Bibiana Steinhaus (Germany); Assistant referees: Marina Wozniak (Germany); Inka Mueller (Germany); Fourth official: Karolina Radzik-Johan (Poland)

July 25 Quarterfinals	United States U-20	1–1 (a.e.t.) (2–4 p)	Nigeria U-20	Augsburg, Germany
11:30 CET/UTC+01	Brooks 9'	Report	Ukaonu 79'	Stadium: Impuls Arena; Referee: Alexandra Ihringova (England); Assistant referees: Anna Nystrom (Sweden); Katrin Rafalski (Germany); Fourth official: Karolina Radzik-Johan (Poland)
	Penalties
	Nairn (penalty missed); Pathman (penalty scored); Mewis (penalty scored); Leroux (penalty missed)		(penalty scored) Jegede; (penalty scored) Ukaonu; (penalty scored) Sunday; (penalty scored) Oparanozie

==== Under-17 ====
2010 CONCACAF Under-17 Women's Championship

March 10 Group B	Haiti U-17	0–9	United States U-17	Alajuela, Costa Rica
18:00		Report	Doll 2'; Smith 13', 31'; Roccaro 16'; Brian 51'; Horan 56', 72', 88', 90+1'	Stadium: Estadio Alejandro Morera Soto; Attendance: 250; Referee: Dianne Ferreira-James (Guyana)

March 12 Group B	United States U-17	13–0	Cayman Islands U-17	Alajuela, Costa Rica
18:00	Horan 2', 39'; Brian 15', 22', 27'; Torres 17'; Solaun 34', 49', 59'; Clark 38'; Farrell 47', 61'	Report		Stadium: Estadio Alejandro Morera Soto; Attendance: 250; Referee: Lucila Venegas (Mexico)

March 14 Group B	Costa Rica U-17	0–10	United States U-17	Alajuela, Costa Rica
20:30		Report	Smith 10', 14', 54'; Doll 17'; Brian 27', 84'; Horan 44', 68'; Torres 66'; Gonzalez 78'	Stadium: Estadio Alejandro Morera Soto; Attendance: 1,700; Referee: Lucila Venegas (Mexico)

March 18 Semifinals	United States U-17	0–0 (a.e.t.) (3–5 p)	Canada U-17	Alajuela, Costa Rica
21:00		Report		Stadium: Estadio Alejandro Morera Soto; Attendance: 250; Referee: Shane de Silva (Trinidad and Tobago)
	Penalties
	Brian (penalty scored); Dahlkemper (penalty scored); Wedemeyer (penalty missed); Solaun (penalty scored)		(penalty scored) Clarke; (penalty scored) Simpson; (penalty scored) Ongtengco; (penalty scored) Sutterland; (penalty scored) Campbell

March 14 Third Place Match	Costa Rica U-17	0–6	United States U-17	Alajuela, Costa Rica
18:00		Report	Clark 5'; Torres 37'; Brannon 40'; Horan 55'; Farrell 66'; Smith 81'	Stadium: Estadio Alejandro Morera Soto; Attendance: 250; Referee: Lucila Venegas (Mexico)

Dallas Cup

April 1	United States U-17	4–1	Brazil U-17	Frisco, Texas
	Clark 8'; Torres 25'; Horan 62'; Smith 85'	Report	61'	Stadium: Pizza Hut Park

April 3	United States U-17	2–2	Brazil U-17	Frisco, Texas
		Report		Stadium: Pizza Hut Park

Nordic Cup

July 5 Group B	United States U-17	6–0	Netherlands U-16	Hillerød, Denmark
	Parker 35'; Lok 41' (o.g.); Spivey 42'; Horan 48' (pen.); Farrell 69'; Amack 72'	Report		Stadium: Hillerød Stadium

July 6 Group B	United States U-17	3–0	Denmark U-16	Hillerød, Denmark
12:00	Horan 21'; Lavrusky 23'; Munerlyn 84'	Report		Stadium: Hillerød Stadium

July 8 Group B	United States U-17	2–1	Norway U-16	Olstykke, Denmark
	Boyles 28'; Munerlyn 37'	Report	Eide 50'	Stadium: Olstykke Stadium

July 10 Final	United States U-17	2–0	Germany U-16	Hillerød, Denmark
	Amack 34'; Lavrusky 66'	Report		Stadium: Hillerød Stadium

== Managerial changes ==
Team	Outgoing	Manner	Date	Table	Incoming	Date	Table
Philadelphia Union	N/A	N/A	N/A	Off-season	Piotr Nowak	May 29, 2009	Off-season
NSC Minnesota Stars	N/A	N/A	N/A	Off-season	Manny Lagos	February 10, 2010	Off-season
Tampa Bay Rowdies	N/A	N/A	N/A	Off-season	Paul Dalglish	November 18, 2009	Off-season
AC St. Louis	N/A	N/A	N/A	Off-season	Claude Anelka	December 8, 2009	Off-season
New York Red Bulls	Richie Williams	Caretaker	August 21, 2009	7th East ('09)	Hans Backe	January 7, 2010	Off-season
Rochester Rhinos	Darren Tilley	Contract expiration	September 28, 2009	6th USL 1st Division ('09)	Bob Lilley	November 16, 2010	Off-season
D.C. United	Tom Soehn	Resigned	November 3, 2009	4th East ('09)	Curt Onalfo	December 28, 2009	Off-season
Chivas USA	Preki	Mutual Consent	November 12, 2009	4th West ('09)	Martín Vásquez	December 2, 2009	Off-season
Chicago Fire	Denis Hamlett	Fired	November 24, 2009	2nd East ('09)	Carlos de los Cobos	January 11, 2010	Off-season
Pittsburgh Riverhounds	Gene Klein	Promoted within club	January 11, 2010	8th USL-2 ('09)	Justin Evans	January 11, 2010	Off-season
D.C. United	Curt Onalfo	Fired	August 4, 2010	8th MLS Eastern Conference ('10)	Ben Olsen	August 4, 2010	8th MLS Eastern Conference ('10)

== League tables ==
=== Major League Soccer ===
Pos	Team	Pld	W	L	T	GF	GA	GD	Pts	
1	LA Galaxy (S)	30	18	7	5	44	26	+18	59	Qualification for the CONCACAF Champions League
2	Real Salt Lake	30	15	4	11	45	20	+25	56	
3	New York Red Bulls	30	15	9	6	38	29	+9	51	
4	FC Dallas	30	12	4	14	42	28	+14	50	Qualification for the CONCACAF Champions League
5	Columbus Crew	30	14	8	8	40	34	+6	50	
6	Seattle Sounders FC (U)	30	14	10	6	39	35	+4	48	Qualification for the CONCACAF Champions League
7	Colorado Rapids (C)	30	12	8	10	44	32	+12	46	Qualification for the CONCACAF Champions League
8	San Jose Earthquakes	30	13	10	7	34	33	+1	46	
9	Kansas City Wizards	30	11	13	6	36	35	+1	39	
10	Chicago Fire	30	9	12	9	37	38	−1	36	
11	Toronto FC (V)	30	9	13	8	33	41	−8	35	Qualification for the CONCACAF Champions League
12	Houston Dynamo	30	9	15	6	40	49	−9	33	
13	New England Revolution	30	9	16	5	32	50	−18	32	
14	Philadelphia Union	30	8	15	7	35	49	−14	31	
15	Chivas USA	30	8	18	4	31	45	−14	28	
16	D.C. United	30	6	20	4	21	47	−26	22	

Source: MLS
Rules for classification: 1) points; 2) head-to-head record; 3) goal difference; 4) number of goals scored
(C) MLS Cup champions; (S) Supporters' Shield winners; (U) U.S. Open Cup winners; (V) Canadian Championship winners

==== Playoffs ====
Conference semifinals
E1	New York Red Bulls	1	1
E4	San Jose Earthquakes	0	3
Eastern Conference
E2	Columbus Crew	0	2 (4)
E3	Colorado Rapids (p)	1	1 (5)
W1	Los Angeles Galaxy	1	2
W4	Seattle Sounders FC	0	1
Western Conference
W2	Real Salt Lake	1	1
W3	FC Dallas	2	1

Conference finals
E4	San Jose Earthquakes	0
E3	Colorado Rapids	1
W1	Los Angeles Galaxy	0
W3	FC Dallas	3

MLS Cup
E3	Colorado Rapids	2
W3	FC Dallas	1

==== MLS Cup ====
November 21
20:30 UTC−05

FC Dallas	1 – 2 (a.e.t.)	Colorado Rapids
Ferreira 35'	(Report)	Casey 57'; John 107' (o.g.)

BMO Field, Toronto, Canada
Attendance: 21,700
Referee: Baldomero Toledo

=== USSF Division 2 Professional League ===
USSF Division 2 Pro League
Pos	Team	Pld	W	L	T	GF	GA	GD	Pts	Qualification
1	Rochester Rhinos	30	16	8	6	38	24	+14	54	Conference leaders, qualified for playoffs
2	Carolina Railhawks FC	30	13	9	8	44	32	+12	47	Conference leaders, qualified for playoffs
3	Austin Aztex	30	15	7	8	53	40	+13	53	Qualified for playoffs (Note: The remaining six teams with the highest point totals, regardless of conference, also advance to the playoffs.)
4	Portland Timbers	30	13	7	10	34	23	+11	49	Qualified for playoffs
5	Vancouver Whitecaps FC	30	10	5	15	32	22	+10	45	Qualified for playoffs
6	Montreal Impact	30	12	11	7	36	30	+6	43	Qualified for playoffs
7	NSC Minnesota Stars	30	11	12	7	32	36	−4	40	Qualified for playoffs
8	Puerto Rico Islanders (C)	30	9	11	10	37	35	+2	37	Qualified for playoffs
9	Miami FC	30	7	11	12	37	49	−12	33	
10	FC Tampa Bay	30	7	12	11	41	46	−5	32	
11	AC St. Louis	30	7	15	8	32	48	−16	29	
12	Crystal Palace Baltimore	30	6	18	6	24	55	−31	24	

Source: USSF D-2 schedule table
(C) Champions

==== Playoffs ====
Each round is a two-game aggregate goal series. Home teams for the first game of each series listed at the bottom of the bracket.

Quarterfinals
1	Rochester Rhinos	0	2	2
8	Puerto Rico Islanders	2	1	3
4	Portland Timbers	0	1	1
5	Vancouver Whitecaps	2	0	2
3	Austin Aztex	0	2	2
6	Montreal Impact	2	3	5
2	Carolina RailHawks	0	4	4
7	NSC Minnesota Stars	0	0	0

Semifinals
5	Vancouver Whitecaps	0	0	0
8	Puerto Rico Islanders (aet)	0	2	2
2	Carolina RailHawks	0	2	2
6	Montreal Impact	1	0	1

Final
2	Carolina RailHawks	0	1	1
8	Puerto Rico Islanders	2	1	3

==== Finals ====
October 24
18:05 UTC−04

Puerto Rico Islanders	2–0	Carolina RailHawks
Gbandi 50'; Faña 87'	(Report)

Juan Ramón Loubriel Stadium, Bayamón, Puerto Rico
Attendance: 6,257
October 30
19:00 UTC−04

Carolina RailHawks	1–1	Puerto Rico Islanders
Heinemann 11'	(Report)	Gbandi 8'

WakeMed Soccer Park, Cary, North Carolina
Attendance: 5,074

=== USL Second Division ===
USL Second Division
Pos	Team	Pld	W	L	T	GF	GA	GD	Pts	Qualification
1	Charleston Battery	20	11	4	5	35	25	+10	38	Regular season champion
2	Richmond Kickers	20	9	5	6	25	20	+5	33	Playoff spot clinched
3	Pittsburgh Riverhounds	20	7	5	8	27	20	+7	29	Playoff spot clinched
4	Charlotte Eagles	20	5	8	7	23	30	−7	22	
5	Harrisburg City Islanders	20	4	9	7	21	30	−9	19	
6	Real Maryland Monarchs	20	3	8	9	16	22	−6	18	

Source: official USL-2 standings table

=== Playoffs ===
USL-2 Semifinal			USL-2 Championship
			1	Charleston Battery	2
2	Richmond Kickers	2	2	Richmond Kickers	1
3	Pittsburgh Riverhounds	0

==== Final ====
August 28
18:10 UTC−04

Charleston Battery	2–1	Richmond Kickers
Neagle 26'; Fuller 52'	Report	Elcock 70'

Blackbaud Stadium, Charleston, South Carolina
Attendance: 4,523

== U.S. Open Cup ==
Round of 16
D.C. United	2
Richmond Kickers	0
Harrisburg City Islanders (AET)	1
New York Red Bulls	0
Columbus Crew	2
Rochester Rhinos	1
Chicago Fire	0 (0)
Charleston Battery (AET/PSO)	0 (3)
Portland Timbers	1 (3)
Seattle Sounders FC	1 (4)
Los Angeles Galaxy	2
AC St. Louis	0
Houston Dynamo	1
Miami FC	0
Chivas USA	1
Austin Aztex	0

Quarterfinals
D.C. United	2
Harrisburg City Islanders	0
Columbus Crew	3
Charleston Battery	0
Seattle Sounders FC	2
Los Angeles Galaxy	0
Houston Dynamo	1
Chivas USA	3

Semifinals
D.C. United	1
Columbus Crew	2
Seattle Sounders FC	3
Chivas USA	1

Final
Seattle Sounders FC	2
Columbus Crew	1

=== Final ===
October 5
19:00 UTC−07

Seattle Sounders FC	2–1	Columbus Crew
Nyassi 38', 66'	(Report)	Burns 24'

Qwest Field, Seattle
Attendance: 31,311
Referee: Michael Kennedy (United States)

== Honors ==
=== Professional ===
Men
Competition		Winner
U.S. Open Cup		Seattle Sounders FC
Major League Soccer	MLS Supporters' Shield	Los Angeles Galaxy
Major League Soccer	MLS Cup	Colorado Rapids
USSF D2 Pro League	Regular season	Rochester Rhinos
USSF D2 Pro League	Playoffs	Puerto Rico Islanders
USL Second Division	Regular season	Charleston Battery
USL Second Division	Playoffs	Charleston Battery

Women
Competition	Winner
Women's Professional Soccer	FC Gold Pride
W-League	Buffalo Flash
Women's Premier Soccer League	Boston Aztec

=== Amateur ===
Men
Competition	Team
USL Premier Development League	Portland Timbers U23's
National Premier Soccer League	Sacramento Gold
NCAA Division I Soccer Championship	Akron Zips
NCAA Division II Soccer Championship	Northern Kentucky Norse
NCAA Division III Soccer Championship	Messiah Falcons
NAIA Soccer Championship	Hastings Broncos

Women
Competition	Team
NCAA Division I Soccer Championship	Notre Dame Fighting Irish
NCAA Division II Soccer Championship	Grand Valley State Lakers
NCAA Division III Soccer Championship	Hardin–Simmons Cowgirls
NAIA Soccer Championship	Lee (Tn.) Flames

== American clubs in international competitions ==
Club	Competition	Final round
Columbus Crew	2009–10 CONCACAF Champions League	Quarterfinals
Columbus Crew	2010–11 CONCACAF Champions League	Quarterfinals
Real Salt Lake	2010–11 CONCACAF Champions League	Finals
Seattle Sounders FC	2010–11 CONCACAF Champions League	Group stage
Los Angeles Galaxy	2010–11 CONCACAF Champions League	Preliminary round
New England Revolution	2010 SuperLiga	Finals
Houston Dynamo	2010 SuperLiga	Semifinals
Chicago Fire	2010 SuperLiga	Group stage
Chivas USA	2010 SuperLiga	Group stage

=== CONCACAF Champions League ===
==== 2009–10 Champions League ====
The Columbus Crew were the only American team to qualify for the Championship Round of the 2009–10 CONCACAF Champions League, the only portion of the competition to occur in the 2010 calendar year. Columbus was drawn against Mexican club Toluca in the quarterfinals. After falling behind at home by two goals in the first half of the first leg, Steven Lenhart notched two second half goals for the Crew to draw even at 2–2. In the return leg in Toluca, the clubs traded goals, with Toluca scoring first and last for the 3–2 victory and 5–4 aggregate victory.

===== Columbus Crew =====
March 9, 2010 Champions League quarterfinals	Columbus Crew (United States)	2–2	(Mexico) Toluca	Columbus, Ohio
20:00 UTC−05	Lenhart 65', 83'	(Report)	Sinha 19'; Ríos 44'	Stadium: Columbus Crew Stadium; Attendance: 4,402; Referee: Courtney Campbell (Jamaica)

March 17, 2010 Champions League quarterfinals	Toluca (Mexico)	3–2	(United States) Columbus Crew	Toluca, Mexico
20:00 UTC−06	Mancilla 47' (pen.); Sinha 57', 72'	(Report)	Schelotto 45' (pen.), 70'	Stadium: Estadio Nemesio Díez; Attendance: 6,946; Referee: Paul Ward (Canada)

==== 2010–11 Champions League ====
The Columbus Crew, Real Salt Lake, Los Angeles Galaxy, and Seattle Sounders FC qualified for the 2010–11 CONCACAF Champions League. Los Angeles, MLS Supporters' Shield runners-up, and Seattle, 2009 U.S. Open Cup champions, entered in the Preliminary round, the opening round of the tournament; Columbus, winners of the 2009 MLS Supporters' Shield, and Salt Lake, winners of the 2009 MLS Cup, entered in the Group stage.

===== Preliminary round =====
In the preliminary round, Los Angeles was drawn against the Puerto Rico Islanders, the 2010 Caribbean champions, and Seattle was drawn against Salvadoran club Isidro Metapán. Both American clubs played as hosts during the first leg of their respective two-legged affairs. The Sounders, on the strength of a Fredy Montero goal in the 60th minute, won their home leg 1–0. Los Angeles, however, holders of the best record in Major League Soccer at the time of their matchup, were defeated 4–1 at the Home Depot Center. The Islanders scored two goals in each half before the Galaxy got a consolation own goal by Richard Martinez in the 83rd minute. In the return leg in Bayamón, Los Angeles, needing to win by at least three goals to force penalties, gave up the first goal of the match. The Galaxy eventually scored two goals for the 2–1 victory but still lost 5–3 on aggregate. Seattle, however was able to secure a 1–1 draw in San Salvador for the 2–1 aggregate victory to move into the group stage.

====== Los Angeles Galaxy ======
July 27, 2010 Champions League preliminary round	Los Angeles Galaxy (United States)	1–4	Puerto Rico Islanders	Carson, California
19:00 UTC−07	Martinez 83' (o.g.)	(Report)	Foley 26'; Addlery 45', 81'; Hansen 56'	Stadium: The Home Depot Center; Attendance: 6,783; Referee: Raymond Bogle (Jamaica)

August 4, 2010 Champions League preliminary round	Puerto Rico Islanders	1–2	(United States) Los Angeles Galaxy	Bayamón, Puerto Rico
20:00 UTC−04	Foley 33' (pen.)	(Report)	Vélez 37' (o.g.); Franklin 84'	Stadium: Juan Ramón Loubriel Stadium; Attendance: 12,993; Referee: Trevor Taylor (Barbados)

====== Seattle Sounders ======
July 28, 2010 Champions League preliminary round	Seattle Sounders FC (United States)	1–0	(El Salvador) Isidro Metapán	Seattle
19:00 UTC−07	Montero 60'	(Report)		Stadium: Qwest Field; Attendance: 17,228; Referee: Ricardo Arellano (Mexico)

August 3, 2010 Champions League preliminary round	Isidro Metapán (El Salvador)	1–1	(United States) Seattle Sounders FC	San Salvador, El Salvador
20:00 UTC−06	Canales 17'	(Report)	Fernández 74'	Stadium: Estadio Cuscatlán; Attendance: 1,083; Referee: Jose Pineda (Honduras)

===== Group stage =====
The group stage draw was conducted prior to the preliminary round, so each team knew all of their opponents as soon as the preliminary round ended. The Columbus Crew, Real Salt Lake, and Seattle Sounders FC each qualified for the group stage.

Real Salt Lake was drawn into Group A against Mexican club Cruz Azul, winners of the 2009–10 Apertura; Panamanian club Árabe Unido, 2009 Apertura II and 2010 Clausura champions; and fellow MLS club Toronto FC, winners of the 2010 Canadian Championship. Salt Lake hosted Árabe Unido in their first group stage match and defeated los Árabes 2–1 on the strength of two Álvaro Saborío goals, his second coming in the fourth minute of second-half added time. Salt Lake's second match was a dramatic affair in a torrential downpour at Estadio Azul in Mexico City, with hosts Cruz Azul emerging as 5–4 victors.

Columbus was drawn into Group B with Mexican club Santos Laguna, 2009–10 Bicentenario winner; Guatemalan club Municipal, champions of the 2009–10 Liga Nacional Apertura and Clausura tournaments; and Trinidad and Tobago club Joe Public, 2010 Caribbean runners-up and 2009 TT Pro League champions. The Crew hosted Municipal in their first match and won 1–0, the goal scored on a strong individual effort by Emmanuel Ekpo. In their second match, Columbus nearly held on for a scoreless draw but were defeated 1–0 at Santos Laguna when Jorge Iván Estrada scored in the third minute of second half added time.

Seattle was drawn into Group C with Mexican club Monterrey, 2009–10 Apertura champions; Costa Rican club Saprissa, 2009–10 Primera División Campeonato de Verano champions; and Honduran club Marathón, 2009–10 Liga Nacional Torneo Apertura champions. In their first group stage match, Seattle visited Marathón at Estadio Olímpico Metropolitano, and after scoring the opening goal, conceded two – all scored in the first half – for a 2–1 loss. Seattle's second match saw another loss as visiting Monterrey came away from Qwest Field with a 2–0 victory.

====== Real Salt Lake ======
August 18, 2010 Group A	Real Salt Lake (United States)	2–1	(Panama) Árabe Unido	Sandy, Utah
20:00 UTC−06	Saborío 45', 90+4' (pen.)	(Report)	Borchers 13' (o.g.)	Stadium: Rio Tinto Stadium; Attendance: 10,626; Referee: Paul Ward (Canada)

August 25, 2010 Group A	Cruz Azul (Mexico)	5–4	(United States) Real Salt Lake	Mexico City, Mexico
19:00 UTC−06	Orozco 5', 76', 87', 89'; Giménez 90+3'	(Report)	Saborío 23' (pen.), 43'; Espíndola 64'; Johnson 90+2'	Stadium: Estadio Azul; Attendance: 3,400; Referee: Óscar Moncada (Honduras)

September 15, 2010 Group A	Real Salt Lake (United States)	4–1	(Canada) Toronto FC	Sandy, Utah
20:00 UTC−06	Beckerman 21'; Olave 40'; Saborío 69' (pen.); Araujo 80'	(Report)	Santos 8'	Stadium: Rio Tinto Stadium; Attendance: 11,579; Referee: Mauricio Morales (Mexico)

September 22, 2010 Group A	Árabe Unido (Panama)	2–3	(United States) Real Salt Lake	Panama City, Panama
19:00 UTC−05	Aguilar 2'; Angulo 51' (pen.)	(Report)	Johnson 10', 43'; Saborío 36'	Stadium: Estadio Rommel Fernández; Attendance: 500; Referee: Benito Archundia (Mexico)

September 28, 2010 Group A	Toronto FC (Canada)	1–1	(United States) Real Salt Lake	Toronto, Canada
20:00 UTC−04	Peterson 20'	(Report)	Morales 67'	Stadium: BMO Field; Attendance: 10,581; Referee: Trevor Taylor (Barbados)

October 19, 2010 Group A	Real Salt Lake (United States)	3–1	(Mexico) Cruz Azul	Sandy, Utah
20:00 UTC−06	Araujo 43', 67'; Warner 69'	(Report)	Villaluz 71'	Stadium: Rio Tinto Stadium; Attendance: 20,468; Referee: Joel Aguilar (El Salvador)

====== Columbus Crew ======
August 18, 2010 Group B	Columbus Crew (United States)	1–0	(Guatemala) Municipal	Columbus, Ohio
20:00 UTC−04	Ekpo 14'	(Report)		Stadium: Columbus Crew Stadium; Attendance: 5,745; Referee: Roberto García (Mexico)

August 24, 2010 Group B	Santos Laguna (Mexico)	1–0	(United States) Columbus Crew	Torreón, Mexico
21:00 UTC−05	Estrada 90+3'	(Report)		Stadium: Estadio Corona; Attendance: 4,700; Referee: Luis Rodríguez (Panama)

September 14, 2010 Group B	Columbus Crew (United States)	3–0	(Trinidad and Tobago) Joe Public	Columbus, Ohio
20:00 UTC−04	Griffit 47'; Garey 51'; Lenhart 79'	(Report)		Stadium: Columbus Crew Stadium; Attendance: 5,445; Referee: Walter López (Guatemala)

September 21, 2010 Group B	Columbus Crew (United States)	1–0	(Mexico) Santos Laguna	Columbus, Ohio
20:00 UTC−04	Mendoza 87'	(Report)		Stadium: Columbus Crew Stadium; Attendance: 6,298; Referee: Courtney Campbell (Jamaica)

September 29, 2010 Group B	Municipal (Guatemala)	2–1	(United States) Columbus Crew	Guatemala City, Guatemala
20:00 UTC−06	Ramírez 19', 39'	(Report)	Iro 44'	Stadium: Estadio Mateo Flores; Attendance: 3,545; Referee: José Pineda (Honduras)

October 21, 2010 Group B	Joe Public (Trinidad and Tobago)	1–4	(United States) Columbus Crew	Macoya, Trinidad and Tobago
20:00 UTC−04	Noel 27' (pen.)	(Report)	Mendoza 20'; Rentería 50' (pen.), 81'; Oughton 90+2'	Stadium: Marvin Lee Stadium; Attendance: 110; Referee: Stanley Lancaster (Guyana)

====== Seattle Sounders ======
August 19, 2010 Group C	Marathón (Honduras)	2–1	(United States) Seattle Sounders FC	San Pedro Sula, Honduras
20:00 UTC−06	Paz 27'; Cardozo 45+1'	(Report)	Levesque 17'	Stadium: Estadio Olímpico Metropolitano; Attendance: 1,990; Referee: Juan Guerra (Guatemala)

August 25, 2010 Group C	Seattle Sounders FC (United States)	0–2	(Mexico) Monterrey	Seattle
19:00 UTC−07		(Report)	Cardozo 41' de Nigris 58'	Stadium: Qwest Field; Attendance: 22,513; Referee: Joel Aguilar (El Salvador)

September 14, 2010 Group C	Saprissa (Costa Rica)	2–0	(United States) Seattle Sounders FC	San José, Costa Rica
20:00 UTC−06	Guzmán 56'; Alemán 81'	(Report)		Stadium: Estadio Ricardo Saprissa Aymá; Attendance: 3,000; Referee: Marco Antonio Rodríguez (Mexico)

September 22, 2010 Group C	Monterrey (Mexico)	3–2	(United States) Seattle Sounders FC	Monterrey, Mexico
19:00 UTC−05	de Nigris 74'; Suazo 75'; Pérez 78' (pen.)	(Report)	Pérez 28' (o.g.); Fucito 44'	Stadium: Estadio Tecnológico; Attendance: 19,697; Referee: Marlon Mejía (El Salvador)

September 29, 2010 Group C	Seattle Sounders FC (United States)	2–0	(Honduras) Marathón	Seattle
19:00 UTC−07	Fucito 21', 68'	(Report)		Stadium: Qwest Field; Attendance: 11,768; Referee: Paul Ward (Canada)

October 19, 2010 Group C	Seattle Sounders FC (United States)	1–2	(Costa Rica) Saprissa	Seattle
19:00 UTC−07	Jaqua 17'	(Report)	Arrieta 26'; Martínez 89'	Stadium: Qwest Field; Attendance: 11,434; Referee: Neal Brizan (Trinidad and Tobago)

=== 2010 SuperLiga ===
The Houston Dynamo, Chicago Fire, Chivas USA, and New England Revolution qualified for the 2010 SuperLiga based upon their finish in the 2009 Major League Soccer season as the four highest-finishing teams not to qualify for the 2010–11 Champions League.

==== New England Revolution ====
July 14 Group B	New England (United States)	1–0	(Mexico) UNAM	Foxborough, Massachusetts
20:00 EDT	Schilawski 18'	Report		Stadium: Gillette Stadium; Attendance: 7,201; Referee: Silviu Petrescu (Canada)

July 17 Group B	Chicago (United States)	0–1	(United States) New England	Bridgeview, Illinois
19:00 EDT		Report	Perović 77'	Stadium: Toyota Park; Attendance: 16,117; Referee: Kevin Stott (United States)

July 20 Group B	New England (United States)	1–0	(Mexico) Morelia	Foxborough, Massachusetts
20:00 EDT	Perović 62'	Report		Stadium: Gillette Stadium; Attendance: 8,173; Referee: Elmer Rodas (Guatemala)

August 4 Semifinals	New England (United States)	1–1 (5–3 p)	(Mexico) Puebla	Foxborough, Massachusetts
19:00 EDT	Mansally 56'	Report	Olivera 58'	Stadium: Gillette Stadium; Attendance: 5,854; Referee: Roberto Moreno (Panama)
	Penalties
	Joseph (penalty scored); Reis (penalty scored); Tierney (penalty scored); Phelan (penalty scored); Mansally (penalty scored)		(penalty scored) Olivera; (penalty scored) Juárez; (penalty scored) Ayala; (penalty missed) Lugo

September 1 Finals	New England (United States)	1–2	(Mexico) Morelia	Foxborough, Massachusetts
19:00 EDT	Alston 79'	Report	Sabah 65' (pen.), 75'	Stadium: Gillette Stadium; Attendance: 10,414; Referee: Carlos Batres (Guatemala)

==== Houston Dynamo ====
July 15 Group A	Houston (United States)	2–1	(Mexico) Pachuca	Houston
20:00 EDT	Ngwenya 18', 85'	Report	Manso 51'	Stadium: Robertson Stadium; Attendance: 10,400; Referee: Jerry Solis (Costa Rica)

July 18 Group A	Houston (United States)	1–1	(United States) Chivas USA	Houston
20:00 EDT	Palmer 6'	Report	Padilla 71'	Stadium: Robertson Stadium; Attendance: 5,007

July 21 Group A	Houston (United States)	1–0	(Mexico) Puebla	Houston
20:00 EDT	Oduro 63'	Report		Stadium: Robertson Stadium; Attendance: 10,033; Referee: Oscar Reyna (Guatemala)

August 5 Semifinals	Houston (United States)	0–1	(Mexico) Morelia	Houston
20:00 EDT		Report	Sabah 47'	Stadium: Robertson Stadium; Attendance: 7,641; Referee: Wálter Quesada (Costa Rica)

==== Chicago Fire ====
July 14 Group B	Chicago (United States)	1–5	(Mexico) Morelia	Bridgeview, Illinois
19:00 EDT	Kinney 49'	Report	Hernandez 4'; Rey 34'; Sabah 40'; Marquez 50'; Lozano 70'	Stadium: Toyota Park; Attendance: 11,009; Referee: Jose Rivera (referee) (El Salvador)

July 17 Group B	Chicago (United States)	0–1	(United States) New England	Bridgeview, Illinois
19:00 EDT		Report	Perović 77'	Stadium: Toyota Park; Attendance: 16,117; Referee: Kevin Stott (United States)

July 20 Group B	Chicago (United States)	1–0	(Mexico) UNAM	Bridgeview, Illinois
21:3- EDT	Conde 35'	Report		Stadium: Toyota Park; Attendance: 9,429; Referee: Jose Pineda (Honduras)

==== Chivas USA ====
July 15 Group A	Chivas USA (United States)	1–2	(Mexico) Puebla	Los Angeles
22:30 EDT	Umaña 85'	Report	Olivera 6'; González 62'	Stadium: Home Depot Center; Attendance: 12,617; Referee: Jose Gaspar Molina (Honduras)

July 18 Group A	Houston (United States)	1–1	(United States) Chivas USA	Houston
20:00 EDT	Palmer 6'	Report	Padilla 71'	Stadium: Robertson Stadium; Attendance: 5,007

July 21 Group A	Chivas USA (United States)	1–0	(Mexico) Pachuca	Los Angeles
22:30 EDT	Maldonado 7'			Stadium: Home Depot Center; Attendance: 14,817; Referee: Marlon Mejía (El Salvador)
