= Paul Robson =

Paul Robson may refer to:

- Paul Robson (footballer) (born 1983), English footballer
- Paul Robson (jockey), Scottish jockey
- Paul Robson (Canadian football) (born 1941), Canadian football player

== See also ==
- Paul Robeson (1898–1976), American bass singer, actor and civil rights activist
- Paul Robeson Jr. (1927–2014), his son, American author, archivist and historian
