= 2010 Crystal Palace Baltimore season =

Crystal Palace Baltimore
2010 season
- Chairman: (United States) Randall Medd
- Manager: (United States) Jim Cherneski
- USSF Division 2: -
- U.S. Open Cup: -
- Top goalscorer: League: - All: -
- Highest home attendance: 2,348
- Lowest home attendance: 507
- Average home league attendance: 1,075
Home colours	Away colours

The 2010 Crystal Palace Baltimore season was the fourth season of the franchise and was played in the temporary USSF Division 2 Pro League.

== Conference table ==
NASL Conference
Pos	Team	Pld	W	L	T	GF	GA	GD	Pts	Qualification
1	Carolina RailHawks FC	30	13	9	8	44	32	+12	47	Conference leader, qualified for playoffs
2	Vancouver Whitecaps FC	30	10	5	15	32	22	+10	45	Qualified for playoffs (Note: The remaining six teams with the highest point totals, regardless of conference, also advance to the playoffs.)
3	Montreal Impact	30	12	11	7	36	30	+6	43	Qualified for playoffs
4	Miami FC	30	7	11	12	37	49	−12	33	
5	AC St. Louis	30	7	15	8	32	48	−16	29	
6	Crystal Palace Baltimore	30	6	18	6	24	55	−31	24	

Source: USSF D-2 schedule table

== Players ==
=== Roster ===
as at April 8, 2010

Note: Flags indicate national team as defined under FIFA eligibility rules; some limited exceptions apply. Players may hold more than one non-FIFA nationality.

No.	Pos.	Nation	Player
1	GK	(United States) USA	Evan Bush
2	DF	(England) ENG	Paul Robson
3	DF	(United States) USA	Stephen Basso
4	DF	(Wales) WAL	Shaun Pejic
5	DF	(United States) USA	Andrew Marshall
6	DF	(Canada) CAN	John Jonke
7	MF	(Portugal) POR	Val Teixeira
8	MF	(Haiti) HAI	Kenold Versailles
9	MF	(United States) USA	Pat Healey
10	MF	(Japan) JPN	Tsuyoshi Yoshitake
11	FW	(Cuba) CUB	Yaikel Perez
12	MF	(United States) USA	Dan Lader

No.	Pos.	Nation	Player
13	FW	(Brazil) BRA	Lucio Gonzaga
14	MF	(Cameroon) CMR	Matthew Mbuta
15	MF	(United States) USA	Neil Vranis
16	DF	(Japan) JPN	Takuro Nishimura
17	FW	(United States) USA	Jordan Seabrook
20	FW	(Trinidad and Tobago) TRI	Randi Patterson
21	MF	(Argentina) ARG	Santiago Fusilier
22	FW	(Brazil) BRA	Adauto Neto (captain)
23	DF	(Bolivia) BOL	Zack Flores
30	FW	(Jamaica) JAM	Gary Brooks
32	GK	(United States) USA	Chase Harrison
34	MF	(United States) USA	Korey Veeder
