= Donoho =

Donoho is a surname. Notable people with the surname include:

- David Donoho (born 1957), American statistician
- Joe Donoho (born 1985), American soccer player
- Ron Donoho, American journalist and media executive
- Todd Donoho (born 1955), American radio and television sportscaster
