= Ariel Germiniani =

Brazilian footballer (born 1990)

Personal information
- Full name: Ariel Germiniani
- Date of birth: April 7, 1990 (age 36)
- Place of birth: Ouro Fino, Brazil
- Height: 5 ft 10 in (1.78 m)
- Position: Midfielder

Senior career*
Years	Team	Apps	(Gls)
2008	Desportivo Brasil		
2009	Estoril		
2010	Miami FC	8	(1)
- * Club domestic league appearances and goals as of September 22, 2010

Ariel Germiniani (born October 20, 1990) is a Brazilian soccer player currently playing for Miami FC in the USSF Division 2 Professional League.

== Career ==
Ariel signed for Miami FC in 2010 after playing for Desportivo Brasil and for one of Miami FC's sister clubs, Estoril, of Liga Vitalis in Portugal.

He made his debut for Miami on May 15, 2010, in a game against NSC Minnesota Stars, and scored his first goal for the team on June 9, 2010, in a game against Crystal Palace Baltimore, before being released by the team mid-season, having made just eight first-team appearances.
