= Zack Flores =

American soccer player (born 1982)

Personal information
- Full name: Zackary Flores
- Date of birth: August 31, 1982 (age 44)
- Place of birth: Logan, Utah, United States
- Height: 5 ft 11 in (1.80 m)
- Position: Defender

College career
Years	Team	Apps	(Gls)
1996–1999	Saint Mary's Gaels		

Senior career*
Years	Team	Apps	(Gls)
2000–2004	Chacarita Juniors		
2004–2007	The Strongest		
2007–2008	Bolívar		
2009–2010	Crystal Palace Baltimore	31	(0)
- * Club domestic league appearances and goals as of October 1, 2010

Zackary Flores (born August 31, 1982, in Logan, Utah) is an American soccer player currently without a club after being released by his most recent club, Crystal Palace Baltimore in the USSF Division 2 Professional League.

== Career ==
=== College and amateur ===
Flores played college soccer at the Saint Mary's College of California.

=== Professional ===
Flores has spent most of his professional career to date in South America, playing for Chacarita Juniors in Argentina, and The Strongest and Club Bolivar in Bolivia. Flores played in the Copa Libertadores and Copa Sudamericana for The Strongest against teams such as São Paulo and Boca Juniors.

Flores returned to the United States in 2008, and trained with Chivas USA, before signing a contract to play with Crystal Palace Baltimore for the 2009 season. On March 16, 2010 Baltimore announced the re-signing of Flores to a new contract for the 2010 season.

=== International ===
Despite being born in the United States, Flores has aligned himself with the Bolivia national football team, and was called up to and trained with the squad in 2005, but did not take part in any games because of injury.

== Personal ==
Zack is the older brother of former fellow professional soccer player Sergio Flores.

== Career statistics ==
(correct as of 2 October 2010)

Club	Season	League			Cup			Continental			Play-Offs			Total			
Club	Season	Apps	Goals	Assists	Apps	Goals	Assists	Apps	Goals	Assists	Apps	Goals	Assists	Apps	Goals	Assists	
Chacarita Juniors	2000–2001	?	?	?	?	?	?	?	?	?	?	?	?	?	?	?	
Chacarita Juniors	2001–2002	?	?	?	?	?	?	?	?	?	?	?	?	?	?	?	
Chacarita Juniors	2002–2003	?	?	?	?	?	?	?	?	?	?	?	?	?	?	?	
Chacarita Juniors	2003–2004	?	?	?	?	?	?	?	?	?	?	?	?	?	?	?	
Total	2000–2004	?	?	?	?	?	?	?	?	?	?	?	?	?	?	?	
The Strongest	2004	10	0	2	0	0	0	0	0	0	0	0	0	0	0	0	
The Strongest	2005	32	5	10	6	1	12	4	0	8	0	0	0	0	0	0	
The Strongest	2006	?	?	?	?	?	?	?	?	?	?	?	?	?	?	?	
The Strongest	2007	?	?	?	?	?	?	?	?	?	?	?	?	?	?	?	
Total	2004–2007	?	?	?	?	?	?	?	?	?	?	?	?	?	?	?	
Club Bolivar	2007	?	?	?	?	?	?	?	?	?	?	?	?	?	?	?	
Total	2007	?	?	?	?	?	?	?	?	?	?	?	?	?	?	?	
Crystal Palace Baltimore	2009	19	0	0	1	0	0	0	0	0	0	0	0	20	0	0	
Crystal Palace Baltimore	2010	12	0	0	0	0	0	0	0	0	0	0	0	12	0	0	
Total	2009–present	31	0	0	1	0	0	0	0	0	0	0	0	32	0	0	
Career Total	2000–present	108	3	?	1	0	0	10	0	?	?	?	?	119	3	?	League titles championships: 2004 - Professional Soccer League (Bolivia) - The Strongest
