= Sean Cameron (footballer) =

American-born Guyanese footballer

Personal information
- Full name: Sean Cameron
- Date of birth: January 26, 1985 (age 41)
- Place of birth: Brooklyn, New York, United States
- Height: 6 ft 1 in (1.85 m)
- Position: Midfielder

Youth career
- 2003–2004: Connecticut Huskies
- 2005–2006: Rutgers Scarlet Knights

Senior career*
Years	Team	Apps	(Gls)
2007–2008	Miami FC	39	(5)
2008	Atlanta Silverbacks	2	(0)
2009	Pittsburgh Riverhounds	10	(0)
2010	Miami FC	19	(0)

International career
2008–2010	Guyana	8	(1)
- * Club domestic league appearances and goals as of September 22, 2010

Sean Cameron (born January 26, 1985, in Brooklyn, New York) is an American-born Guyanese footballer who most recently played for Miami FC in the USSF Division 2 Professional League.

== Career ==
=== Youth and college ===
While born in Brooklyn, Cameron grew up in North Brunswick, New Jersey, where he attended North Brunswick Township High School. He was a two time first team All State soccer player at North Brunswick. In 2003, Cameron entered the University of Connecticut, playing on the men's soccer team in 2003 and 2004. He played fifteen games as a freshman, but only seven as a sophomore. Frustrated by his low playing time, he transferred to the Rutgers University in 2005. He finished his career in 2006 at Rutgers.

=== Professional ===
On February 8, 2007, Cameron signed with Miami FC of the USL First Division. He was a regular on the Blues’ back line for nearly two seasons before being traded to the Atlanta Silverbacks in exchange for Ansu Toure on August 16, 2008.

In 2009, he joined the Pittsburgh Riverhounds, and played 10 games for team, before re-joining his first professional club, Miami FC, in 2010.

=== International ===
Cameron, who holds both U.S. and Guyana citizenship - the latter through his father - has played for the Guyana national football team.
