= Euzébio Neto =

Brazilian footballer (born 1990)

Personal information
- Full name: Euzébio Andrade Silva Neto
- Date of birth: 20 October 1990 (age 36)
- Place of birth: Gararu, Brazil
- Height: 5 ft 10 in (1.78 m)
- Position: Right back

Team information
- Current team: Desportivo Brasil

Senior career*
Years	Team	Apps	(Gls)
2008–	Desportivo Brasil	0	(0)
2009–2010	→ Estoril (loan)	2	(0)
2010	→ Miami FC (loan)	12	(0)
- * Club domestic league appearances and goals as of September 22, 2010

Euzébio Andrade Silva Neto (born 20 October 1990), commonly known as Euzébio Neto, is a Brazilian footballer currently playing for Desportivo Brasil.

== Career ==
Euzébio signed for Miami FC in 2010 after playing for Desportivo Brasil and for one of Miami FC's sister clubs, Estoril, of Liga Vitalis in Portugal.

He made his debut for Miami on May 8, 2010 in a game against the Carolina RailHawks.
