= Kyle Veris =

American soccer player (born 1983)

Personal information
- Full name: Kyle Veris
- Date of birth: March 15, 1983 (age 43)
- Place of birth: Washington, D.C., United States
- Height: 6 ft 4 in (1.93 m)
- Position: Defender

Youth career
- 2001–2002: Akron Zips
- 2003–2005: Ohio State Buckeyes

Senior career*
Years	Team	Apps	(Gls)
2002	Mid-Michigan Bucks	9	(0)
2003	Columbus Shooting Stars	7	(2)
2004	Toledo Slayers	1	(0)
2005	Michigan Bucks	13	(2)
2006–2007	Los Angeles Galaxy	18	(0)
2008	Hødd	17	(0)
2009	Puerto Rico Islanders	20	(0)
2010	Miami FC	18	(1)
2011–2012	Pittsburgh Riverhounds	7	(0)
- * Club domestic league appearances and goals as of May 22, 2011

Kyle Veris (born March 15, 1983, in Washington, D.C.) is an American soccer player.

== Career ==
=== Youth and college ===
Veris grew up in Strongsville, Ohio, and learned to play soccer in the Lake Erie Youth Premier Soccer League. He began his career as playing club soccer for Ohio Premier, winning many league championships and accolades. He ended his career in the LEYPSL playing with Cleveland United, another powerhouse team where he flourished under the Serbian coach, Joe Raduka and Josepphi Pavlek.

Veris played high school soccer at Strongsville High School, and played college soccer at Akron for two years as a center forward before transferring to Ohio State in 2003. At Ohio State, he switched to central defense after redshirting the 2003 season and was named all-Big Ten Conference as a defender in 2004 and 2005.

He also played extensively in the USL Premier Development League, having spells with Michigan Bucks, Toledo Slayers and Columbus Shooting Stars.

=== Professional ===
Veris was drafted in the third round (25th overall) of the 2006 MLS SuperDraft by Los Angeles Galaxy. Over the course of the season, he started 10 games for the Galaxy, but never pinned down a consistent first team spot, and was waived at the end of 2007.

After a one-year stint at Hødd in Norway, Veris signed with the Puerto Rico Islanders for the 2009 season. In February 2010 Veris signed with Miami FC.

Veris signed with Pittsburgh Riverhounds of the USL Pro league on March 29, 2011.
