= Ron Donoho =

American journalist

- Occupations: Journalist, media executive
- Website: junketsandjaunts.com

Ron Donoho is an American journalist and media executive. He is the founder/editor of the offbeat JunketsAndJaunts.com travel site and the author of the "Junkets & Jaunts" travel book. He is the former editor of San Diego Magazine, San Diego Home/Garden Lifestyles Magazine and SanDiego.com. He has served as editor of San Diego CityBeat. From 2014 to 2015, he served as Chief Content Officer at the Lucy Burns Institute, the nonprofit organization that publishes Ballotpedia and Judgepedia.

== Career ==
Donoho served as executive editor of San Diego Magazine for twelve years. He was laid off from that position in 2008. In 2009, Donoho launched sandiegoDTOWN.com, a website that covered happenings in downtown San Diego. The website was eventually acquired by SanDiego.com. Donoho went on to serve as editor-in-chief of SanDiego.com before becoming the website's chief editorial officer in 2010. In 2011, Donoho joined McKinnon Publishing as editor of its subsidiary, San Diego Home/Garden Lifestyles Magazine. In May 2014, he joined the Lucy Burns Institute, publisher of Ballotpedia and Judgepedia, as Chief Content Officer. In 2015, Donoho became editor of San Diego CityBeat.

Donoho is the recipient of over 40 awards from the San Diego Press Club and Society of Professional Journalists. Donoho previously contributed to NBCSanDiego.com. Donoho is the co-author of the book The Coronado Company: The True Story of Surfers, Smugglers, and Marijuana. The Cornado Company is the subject of a film, Coronado High, directed by George Clooney. In 2013, Donoho was one of ten national finalists in a Ron Burgundy look-alike contest.
