= Paul Robson (jockey) =

Scottish jockey

Paul Robson is a retired Scottish National Hunt jockey. He was born in Hawick and was based in Penrith riding first for trainer Jonjo O'Neill and later Nicky Richards. Robson had career total of 89 wins from over 600 rides between 2001–2005 including 29 in one of his early seasons. In 2005, at the age of 22, Robson sustained serious injuries which forced him into early retirement from racing.

== Post– racing career ==
After retiring Robson received help from the Jockeys Employment Training Scheme which led to him being trained as a joiner and funeral director. Today, Robson runs his own funeral directors business in his home town of Hawick.
