= Ansu Toure =

Liberian footballer (born 1981)

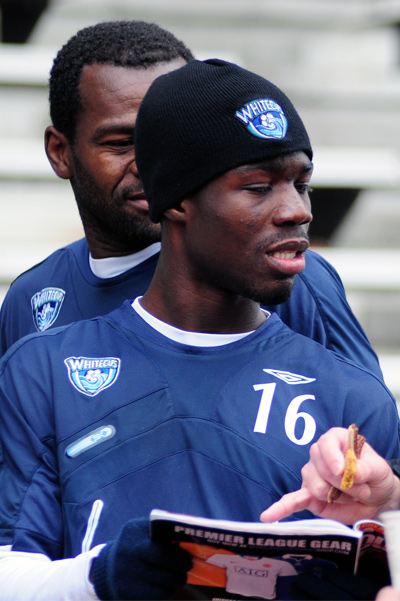
- Toure with Vancouver Whitecaps

Personal information
- Date of birth: 18 March 1981 (age 45)
- Place of birth: Monrovia, Liberia
- Height: 5 ft 11 in (1.80 m)
- Position: Forward

Youth career
- Genesis Football Club

Senior career*
Years	Team	Apps	(Gls)
2004–2006	Minnesota Twin Stars	24	(27)
2006–2007	Minnesota Thunder	34	(9)
2007–2008	Atlanta Silverbacks	19	(9)
2008–2009	Miami FC	9	(4)
2009–2010	Vancouver Whitecaps	37	(12)
2010–2012	FC Locarno	38	(17)
2012–2014	FC Vestsjælland	35	(14)
2014–2015	Persiba Balikpapan	22	(9)

International career
2004	Liberia U14	17	(13)
2005	Liberia U15	6	(0)
2006	Liberia U20	5	(0)
2016	Liberia	19	(10)
- * Club domestic league appearances and goals

Ansu Toure (born 18 March 1981) is a Liberian former professional footballer who played as a forward. He represented the Liberia national team internationally.

== Career ==
=== Youth and amateur ===
Toure played five years of youth football with Genesis Football Club in his native Liberia, before moving with his family to St. Paul, Minnesota, in 1999. He graduated from Park Center Senior High School in Brooklyn Park, Minnesota, before taking courses in sport management at North Hennepin Community College in 2009 and 2010. Toure also netted 27 goals in 14 appearances for the Minnesota Twin Stars in the National Premier Soccer League in 2006.

=== Professional ===
Toure first entered the United Soccer Leagues First Division with Minnesota Thunder in July 2006, and in two seasons with the Thunder, Toure scored six goals and added one assist in 34 appearances. Prior to the start of his second season in Minnesota, Toure played in eight preseason matches during a two-month trial with New York Red Bulls of Major League Soccer. During his spell with the Red Bulls, Toure scored a goal against Houston Dynamo as well as the game-winner against D.C. United. Bruce Arena commented on Toure that he had a nice hard shot and was getting better every week. Despite Toure impressing Red Bulls Coach Arena, he was not offered a contract.

Toure transferred to the Atlanta Silverbacks in 2007, eventually scoring six goals and recording four assists in 19 matches. Two of Toure's six goals last season came in Atlanta's 3–2 loss to the Whitecaps on 10 August. Four days after the Whitecaps match, Toure was traded to Miami FC for midfielder Sean Cameron. As a member of the Blues, the winger assisted on one goal during his eight appearances.

On 21 January 2009 Toure joined Vancouver Whitecaps, signing a two-year contract. He scored his first goal for the team on 9 June 2010 against the Carolina RailHawks.

In February 2011, Toure signed a contract with Swiss Challenge League club FC Locarno. After releasing from Locarno, he joined Danish 1st Division side FC Vestsjaelland on 2 July 2012.

=== International ===
Toure has played for the under-14, under-15, and under-20 Liberian national teams. In 2013, he represented Liberia in 2014 World Cup qualifiers against Uganda and Senegal.
