= Bryan Dominguez =

American soccer player (born 1991)

Personal information
- Full name: Bryan Alexander Dominguez Solarte
- Date of birth: March 7, 1991 (age 35)
- Place of birth: Atlanta, Georgia, United States
- Height: 5 ft 5 in (1.65 m)
- Position: Midfielder

Youth career
- 2006–2007: IMG Soccer Academy

College career
Years	Team	Apps	(Gls)
2008	UC Santa Barbara Gauchos	13	(1)

Senior career*
Years	Team	Apps	(Gls)
2010	Miami FC	15	(0)
2011–2012	América de Cali		
2012–2013	1. FCA Darmstadt	6	(0)

International career^{‡}
- United States U17
- United States U18
- United States U20
- * Club domestic league appearances and goals as of 21:01, 25 March 2016 (UTC) ‡ National team caps and goals as of 21:01, 25 March 2016 (UTC)

Bryan Alexander Dominguez Solarte (born March 7, 1991) is an American soccer player currently without a club.

== Early life and education ==
Dominguez was born in Atlanta, Georgia, but moved to Cali, Colombia, around the age of 1 and grew up there. His family returned to the Atlanta-area after around 10 years. Dominguez was offered a place at the US National Residency Program in Bradenton, Florida in 2006. He attended the Edison Academic Center and was named on back-to-back NSCAA/adidas Boys Youth All-America Teams in 2006 and 2007. He was also named as a Parade magazine All-American.

Dominguez enrolled at the University of California, Santa Barbara and played college soccer as a student-athlete for the UC Santa Barbara Gauchos men's soccer team. In his single season on campus, he appeared in 13 games and scored 1 goal with 5 assists.

== Club career ==
Dominguez, who left school early to pursue a professional career, signed a contract with Traffic Sports USA in 2009. He would eventually be placed with Miami FC of the USSF Division 2 Professional League. He made his professional debut on April 10, 2010, in a game against the Rochester Rhinos. He appeared in 15 games for the club, scoring 0 goals and assisting once.

Dominguez joined América de Cali of the Colombian Categoría Primera B in 2011 and was promoted from the youth and reserve set up in January 2012.

Dominguez later joined German Hessenliga side 1. FCA Darmstadt in 2012. He appeared in 6 Hessenliga matches for the club before leaving.

== International career ==
Dominguez was a member of the United States U-14 and U-16 boys national teams. He would play for the United States U-17 men's national soccer team in 2007, and scored one goal in his four appearances with the team at the FIFA U-17 World Cup in South Korea. He would later feature for the United States U-20 men's national soccer team.
