= Matt Bobo =

American soccer player (born 1977)

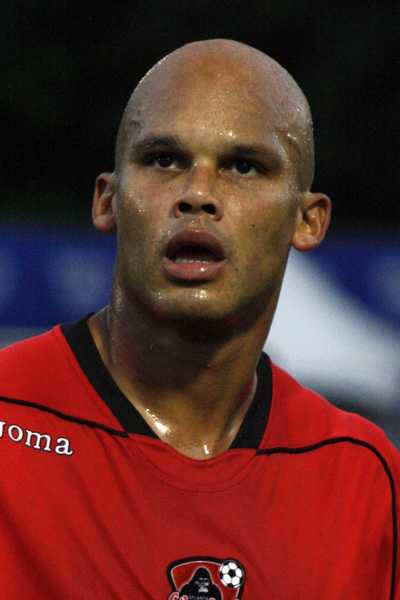

Personal information
- Full name: Matthew Bobo
- Date of birth: January 6, 1977 (age 49)
- Place of birth: Des Moines, Iowa, U.S.
- Height: 6 ft 1 in (1.85 m)
- Position: Defender

Youth career
- 1995–1996: UW–Green Bay Phoenix
- 1997–1998: Eastern Illinois Panthers

Senior career*
Years	Team	Apps	(Gls)
1998	Des Moines Menace		
1999–2000	Chicago Sockers		
2001	Chicago Fire Reserves		
2001–2002	Milwaukee Rampage	26	(4)
2003–2005	Richmond Kickers	50	(2)
2006–2008	Atlanta Silverbacks	74	(8)
2009	Charleston Battery	28	(2)
2010	Carolina RailHawks	23	(1)
- * Club domestic league appearances and goals

Matthew "Matt" Bobo (born January 6, 1977, in Des Moines, Iowa) is an American soccer player who last played for Carolina RailHawks in the North American Soccer League.

== Career ==
=== College and amateur ===
Bobo attended the University of Wisconsin–Green Bay where he played on the men's soccer team in 1995 and 1996. In 1997, he transferred to Eastern Illinois University, where he was a First-Team All-Midwest and EIU's MVP as a senior.

In 1998, Bobo played for the Des Moines Menace in the USISL during the collegiate off season. In 1999 and 2000, he spent the seasons with the Chicago Sockers of the USL Premier Development League, winning the 1999 and 2000 league championships. In 2001, he moved to the Chicago Fire Reserves where he was a first team All Star.

=== Professional ===
Bobo turned professional in 2001, and signed with the Milwaukee Rampage of the USL A-League. He remained with the Rampage through the 2002 season, winning the 2002 championship. In 2003, he moved to the Richmond Kickers. In February 2006, Jason Smith announced that Bobo was to join the Atlanta Silverbacks. He has said of his move, "I think that the Silverbacks have a great organization and I'm looking forward to being a part of it."

After the insolvence from his club Atlanta Silverbacks joined on 24 March 2009 to Charleston Battery.

Bobo signed with Carolina RailHawks in February 2010. He was not listed on the club's roster for the 2011 season.

== Personal life ==
Matt is married to former professional soccer player Krista Bobo (née Davey).
