= Edward Santeliz =

Guatemalan footballer (born 1987)

Personal information
- Full name: Edward Santeliz de la Roca
- Date of birth: 18 June 1987 (age 39)
- Place of birth: Mazatenango, Guatemala
- Height: 5 ft 7 in (1.70 m)
- Position: Forward

Senior career*
Years	Team	Apps	(Gls)
2005–2009	Suchitepéquez		
2010	Miami FC	17	(1)
2010–2011	Chicago Riot (indoor)	11	(3)
2011–2012	Suchitepéquez		
2012–2013	Deportivo Malacateco		
2013–2014	Comunicaciones	16	(2)
2014–	Xelajú MC	4	

International career
2007	Guatemala U20		
2013–2019	Guatemala	7	(1)
- * Club domestic league appearances and goals as of 20:00, 1 January 2025 (UTC)

Edward Santeliz de la Roca (born 18 June 1987), nicknamed Chuky, is a Guatemalan professional footballer who plays as a forward.

== Club career ==
Santeliz grew up in the suburb of Glendale Heights where he played for Sockers FC Chicago and starred on his high school team, the Glenbard East Rams, where he earned all-state accolades.

Santeliz left his native Chicago when he was 18 years old to join Suchitepéquez, where he quickly made a name for himself in his five years with the club.

Santeliz was signed by USSF Division 2 club Miami FC in March 2010. After the season, he signed with Major Indoor Soccer League side Chicago Riot and played 11 games before being released to return to Suchitepéquez. Santeliz played for Comunicaciones in the 2013/2014 season and recently transferred to club Xelajú MC in 2014

== International career ==
Santeliz's strong performances for Suchitepéquez earned him a spot on the Guatemalan Under-20 team that played in the qualifying tournament for the 2007 FIFA U-20 World Cup held in Canada.

== Career statistics ==
=== International goals ===
Scores and results list Guatemala's goal tally first.

No.	Date	Venue	Opponent	Score	Result	Competition
1.	12 October 2019	Raymond E. Guishard Technical Centre, The Valley, Anguilla	Anguilla	2–0	5–0	2019–20 CONCACAF Nations League C
