= Zach Kirby =

American soccer player (born 1985)

Personal information
- Full name: Zachary Kirby
- Date of birth: January 2, 1985 (age 41)
- Place of birth: Atlanta, Georgia, United States
- Height: 6 ft 2 in (1.88 m)
- Position: Defender

Youth career
- 2003–2006: Boston University Terriers

Senior career*
Years	Team	Apps	(Gls)
2007	Los Angeles Galaxy	0	(0)
2007	Wilmington Hammerheads	5	(0)
2008	Atlanta Silverbacks	17	(0)
2009–2011	Fort Lauderdale Strikers	36	(0)
- * Club domestic league appearances and goals as of May 7, 2011

Zachary Kirby (born January 2, 1985) is a retired professional soccer player.

== Career ==
=== Youth and college ===
Kirby grew up in Roswell, Georgia, where he attended Pope High School. During his youth career, Kirby played club soccer for United Quest where his team was a four-time Georgia State Champion. He was selected to join the Olympic Development Program's Georgia State and Southeast Regional Teams and was also a National Team participant during his youth career from 1999 to 2002.

He received an athletic scholarship to play college soccer at Boston University from 2003 to 2006. As team captain during his senior year in 2006, he was awarded the America East Conference Defender of the Year, selected to the America East All Conference Team, and recognized on a national level as an All-American athlete. He graduated with a bachelor's degree in psychology and business administration.

=== Professional ===
Kirby was drafted 22nd overall in the 2nd round of the 2007 Major League Soccer Supplemental Draft by the Los Angeles Galaxy. This was the same year David Beckham signed his first contract with the Los Angeles Galaxy and the club retained Kirby's player rights for two years. He finished the 2007 season with the Wilmington Hammerhead of the United Soccer League (USL) Second Division. In 2008, he signed with the Atlanta Silverbacks of the USL First Division. In 2009, he signed with Miami FC of the North American Soccer League (NASL) where he was named the 2009 Defensive Player of the Year. From 2010 to 2011, Kirby finished his career as the team captain for the Fort Lauderdale Strikers of the NASL while he was receiving his Master of Business Administration with a specialization in sports management from Florida Atlantic University.

Kirby retired from professional soccer on July 18, 2011. Currently, he is a financial advisor for Merrill Lynch Wealth Management in Miami, Florida.
