= Troy Roberts (soccer) =

American soccer player (born 1983)

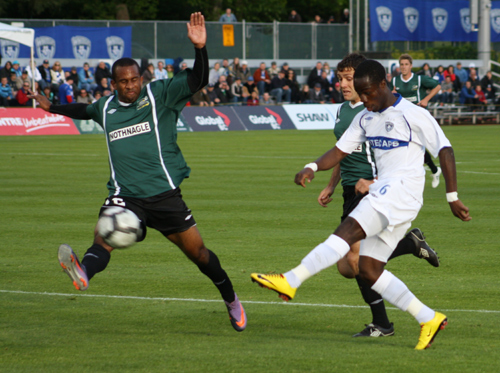
- Roberts (in green) playing for Rochester in 2010

Personal information
- Full name: Troy Dazrell Roberts
- Date of birth: September 18, 1983 (age 43)
- Place of birth: San Jose, California, United States
- Height: 5 ft 10 in (1.78 m)
- Position: Defender

Youth career
- 2001–2004: California Golden Bears

Senior career*
Years	Team	Apps	(Gls)
2004	Sonoma County Sol		
2005–2008	Los Angeles Galaxy	61	(2)
2009	Cleveland City Stars	29	(0)
2010–2013	Rochester Rhinos	94	(3)
- * Club domestic league appearances and goals as of April 28, 2014

Troy Roberts (born September 18, 1983) is an American former soccer player.

== Career ==
=== College and amateur ===
Roberts attended Washington High School in Fremont, California, and played college soccer at UC Berkeley, and was named All-Pac-10 his junior and senior seasons. He also played in the National Premier Soccer League with Sonoma County Sol in its inaugural season in 2004.

=== Professional ===
Roberts was drafted in the first round (8th overall) in the 2005 MLS SuperDraft by Los Angeles Galaxy, and although he saw limited action with the team in his rookie season, went on to play 61 games in his four years with the club, winning both the MLS Cup and the US Open Cup in 2005.

Roberts was waived by Galaxy in February 2009, and joined the Cleveland City Stars of the USL First Division in April 2009.

In March 2010, Roberts signed with the Rochester Rhinos of the USSF 2nd Division. He re-signed for 2012, his third season with Rochester, on October 25, 2011.

== Personal ==
Roberts graduated with a bachelor's degree in Social Welfare at UC Berkeley. He is the older brother of fellow former professional soccer player Jamil Roberts. In 2014, Roberts decided to retire from soccer and sell insurance for a living with former Rochester Rhinos players Alfonso Motagalvan and Nano Short.

== Honors ==
=== Los Angeles Galaxy ===
- Major League Soccer MLS Cup (1): 2005

=== Rochester Rhinos ===
- USSF D-2 Pro League Regular Season Champions (1): 2010

=== Individual ===
- USSF D-2 Pro League Best XI (1): 2010
