= Santiago Fusilier =

Argentine footballer

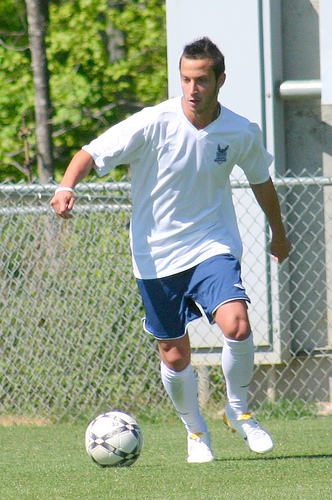

Personal information
- Full name: Santiago Fusilier
- Date of birth: December 12, 1983 (age 42)
- Place of birth: Buenos Aires, Argentina
- Height: 5 ft 9 in (1.75 m)
- Position: Midfielder

Youth career
- 2003–2006: NC State Wolfpack

Senior career*
Years	Team	Apps	(Gls)
2005–2006	Raleigh Elite	35	(15)
2007–2009	Carolina RailHawks	75	(14)
2010	Crystal Palace Baltimore	38	(11)
- * Club domestic league appearances and goals as of September 25, 2010

Santiago Fusilier (born December 12, 1983) is an Argentinian former soccer player who played as a midfielder and was most famous for his time with Crystal Palace Baltimore. Santiago was the ACC Freshman Player of the Year in 2003. He was one of the best players in NC State, being named All-ACC in 2005, 2006 and 2007. He had the winning goal against UNC when they were ranked number 1 in the nation which led the Wolfpack to win the ACC championship. Fusilier was the fan favorite player voted when playing for the Carolina Railhawks in 2007 and 2008. He was voted the offensive player of the year in 2008, where he led the team in points with 6 goals and 8 assists.

== Career ==
=== College and amateur ===
Fusilier came from his native Argentina to the United States in 2003 to play college soccer at North Carolina State University. He was named to the ACC's All-Freshman Team in his debut year, and finished his college career with over 50 appearances for the Wolfpack over the course of his four years at the school.

During his college years Fusilier also played for Raleigh Elite in the USL Premier Development League, where he was coached by future Carolina RailHawks coaches Scott Schweitzer and Damon Nahas.

=== Professional ===
Fusilier turned professional in 2007 when he signed with the expansion Carolina RailHawks of the USL First Division. He played 68 games and scored 16 goals for the RailHawks in his two seasons with the club, before being released at the end of the 2010 season. Santiago was traded to charleston and then ended up the 2009 year signing for Miami FC. He started 21 games and scored 3 goals with the blues.

After Miami Fc in 2009, Fusilier was signed by Crystal Palace Baltimore for the 2010 season. After 16 appearances for the club, he was released in December 2012.

== Career statistics ==
(correct as of 26 September 2010)

Club	Season	League													Cup	Play-Offs	Total
Club	Season	Apps	Goals	Assists	Apps	Goals	Assists	Apps	Goals	Assists	Apps	Goals	Assists				
Carolina Railhawks	2007	16	0	?	?	?	?	0	11	9	16	0	?				
Carolina Railhawks	2008	54	16	9	12	?	1	?	0	0	0	65	5	3			
Total	2007–2008	68	17	3	?	1	?	0	0	0	41	5	3				
Crystal Palace Baltimore	2010	16	0	1	0	0	0	-	-	-	16	0	1				
Total	2010–present	16	0	1	0	0	0	-	-	-	16	0	1				
Career Total	2007–present	56	4	4	?	1	?	0	0	0	57	5	4				

2009 Charleston Battery

2009 Miami FC 2012 Carolina Railhawks
