= Joe Donoho =

American soccer player (born 1985)

Personal information
- Full name: Joseph Donoho
- Date of birth: May 16, 1985 (age 41)
- Place of birth: Tampa, Florida, United States
- Height: 6 ft 3 in (1.91 m)
- Position: Defender

Youth career
- 2003–2005: Rutgers Scarlet Knights
- 2006–2007: Bradley Braves

Senior career*
| Years | Team | Apps | (Gls) |
| 2007 | Michigan Bucks | 6 | (0) |
| 2010 | FC Tampa Bay | 14 | (2) |
- * Club domestic league appearances and goals as of September 22, 2010

Joe Donoho (born May 16, 1985) is an American former soccer player.

== Career ==
=== College ===
Donoho attended Jesuit High School (where he played varsity basketball instead of soccer) and played three years of college soccer at Rutgers University. He helped the Scarlet Knights to the second round of the 2003 NCAA Tournament, before redshirting his junior year in 2005 and then transferring to Bradley University during the winter break. While at Bradley he was named to the All-MVC Second-Team in 2006 and to the Holiday Inn City Center Classic All-Tournament team in 2007.

During his college years Donoho also played for the Michigan Bucks in the USL Premier Development League, helping his PDL squad to the Great Lakes Division championship and the third-best regular-season record.

=== Professional ===
Undrafted out of college, Donoho took a two-year hiatus from soccer in 2008 and 2009, during which time he played in local amateur men's soccer leagues in the Tampa area and worked as an insurance agent for GEICO.

After attending an open tryout, Donoho signed for FC Tampa Bay in the USSF Division 2 Professional League in 2010. He made his professional debut - and scored his first professional goal - on May 14, 2010, in a 2–1 victory over the Carolina RailHawks On November 30, 2010, the club announced it would not exercise its contract option on Donoho for the 2011 season.
