= John Gilkerson =

American soccer player

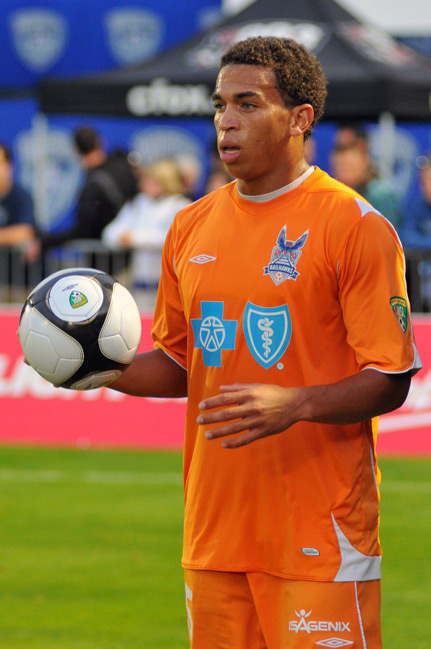

Personal information
- Full name: John Gilkerson
- Date of birth: May 6, 1985 (age 41)
- Place of birth: Winchester, Virginia, United States
- Height: 6 ft 0 in (1.83 m)
- Position: Defender

Youth career
- 2004–2007: Winthrop Eagles

Senior career*
Years	Team	Apps	(Gls)
2006	Virginia Beach Submariners	14	(0)
2007	Hampton Roads Piranhas	16	(1)
2008	New York Red Bulls	0	(0)
2008	→ Richmond Kickers (loan)	6	(0)
2009–2010	Carolina RailHawks	37	(0)
2011	NSC Minnesota Stars	6	(0)
- * Club domestic league appearances and goals as of July 15, 2011

John Gilkerson (born May 6, 1985, in Winchester, Virginia) is an American soccer player.

== Career ==
=== College and amateur ===
Gilkerson was a standout defender during his college career at Winthrop University. He was named to the All-Big South first team in his junior and senior years. In 2006, he was named to the NSCAA All-South Atlantic Region Team. In 2007 Gilkerson started in all of the Eagles’ 18 regular-season games, collecting one goal and two assists while leading a defense that conceded only 13 goals all season. Gilkerson, who has also played for the Virginia Beach Submariners and Hampton Roads Piranhas (Premier Development League), helped guide a Winthrop defense that earned a 0.73 goals-against average in 2006, good for 16th in the nation.

=== Professional ===
Following his senior season he was drafted by Red Bull New York with the 35th pick in the 2008 MLS Supplemental Draft. After spending part of 2008 out on loan at Richmond Kickers of the USL Second Division, Gilkerson made his full professional debut for the Red Bulls on 1 July 2008, in a US Open Cup third-round game against Crystal Palace Baltimore.

In January 2009, he signed with the Carolina RailHawks in the USL First Division and stayed with the club through the 2010 season.

Gilkerson signed with NSC Minnesota Stars of the North American Soccer League on March 15, 2011. He was released by the club on November 29, 2011.
