= Paul Robson (footballer) =

English footballer (born 1983)

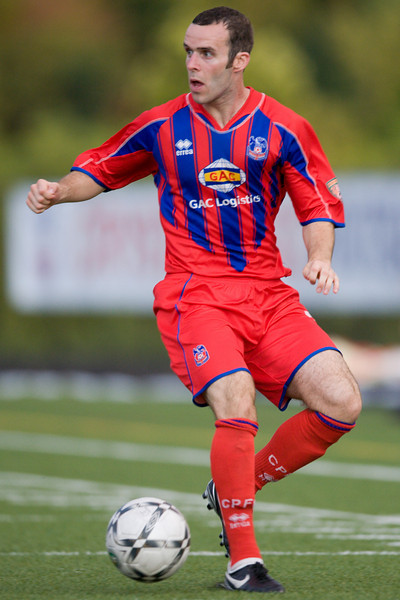

Personal information
- Full name: Paul Robson
- Date of birth: 4 August 1983 (age 43)
- Place of birth: Hull, England
- Position: Defender

Team information
- Current team: North Ferriby United (assistant)

Youth career
- 1999–2001: Doncaster Rovers

Senior career*
| Years | Team | Apps | (Gls) |
| 2001–2003 | Charlton Athletic | 0 | (0) |
| 2004–2005 | Bridlington Town | 3 | (1) |
| 2005–2007 | Long Island Rough Riders | 46 | (1) |
| 2008–2011 | Crystal Palace Baltimore | 63 | (1) |
| 2011 | Newport County | 7 | (0) |
| 2012–2013 | Lincoln City | 33 | (0) |
| 2013–2014 | North Ferriby United | 51 | (1) |
| 2014–2017 | Scarborough Athletic | 71 | (1) |
| 2017 | Barton Town | 5 | (0) |
| 2017–2018 | Bridlington Town | 11 | (1) |
| 2018 | North Ferriby United | | |
| 2019 | Hall Road Rangers | | |

Managerial career
- 2016–2017: Brigg Town (assistant)
- 2017: Barton Town (player-assistant)
- 2018-2019: North Ferriby United (player-assistant)
- 2019–: North Ferriby (assistant)
- * Club domestic league appearances and goals

Paul Robson (born 4 August 1983) is an English retired professional footballer who currently is the assistant manager of North Ferriby United.

He has previously played for North Ferriby United, Doncaster Rovers, Charlton Athletic, Bridlington Town, Long Island Rough Riders, Crystal Palace Baltimore, Newport County and Lincoln City.

== Career ==
=== England ===
Robson was on the books of Doncaster Rovers as a youth team player until 2001, when he joined Charlton Athletic, and became an integral part of the reserve team system. His contract was extended in 2002, but with injury disrupting his 2002–03 season, he failed to break through to the first team, and in June 2003, 20-year-old Robson was released. Robson then went on to sign for Northern Premier League team Bridlington Town for 1 month before heading to America.

=== United States ===
Robson relocated to the United States in 2005. He signed with the Long Island Rough Riders in the USL Second Division, and stayed with the club through the end of 2007.

After two seasons in Uniondale, Robson left to join Crystal Palace Baltimore in 2008. He enjoyed a trial spell at Baltimore's parent club, Crystal Palace, in January 2009, but was not offered a contract by the team. On 16 March 2010 Baltimore were pleased to announce the re-signing of Robson to a new contract for the 2010 season.

=== Return to British football ===
On 28 July 2011 Robson signed a professional contract with Conference National side Newport County but left Newport in October 2011. In January 2012 Robson signed with Lincoln City of the Conference National. After helping keep Lincoln City in the Conference National with some impressive performances, Robson signed a new contract which would keep him at the club until May 2013. On 29 January 2013, however, Robson left the club by mutual consent. He swiftly linked up with North Ferriby United. North Ferriby finished the 2012–13 season winning the Doodson Cup, the East Riding FA Senior Cup and the Northern Premier League title. Robson resigned with North Ferriby for the 2013–14 season, finishing in second place and missing out on promotion through the playoffs.

For the 2014–15 season Robson signed with Scarborough Athletic of the Northern Premier League. After an impressive debut season, Robson re-signed with Scarborough for the 2015–16 season. Robson again re-signed with Scarborough Athletic for the 2016–17 season but a torn cruciate ligament in the pre-season friendly with Harrogate Town curtailed his season. Whilst undergoing his recovery, Robson agreed to join the coach set-up at Brigg Town under the management of his erstwhile North Ferriby United and Scarborough Athletic team-mate Nathan Peat. He remained with the club until June 2017 when the entire management team departed.

In July 2017 he joined Barton Town as player/coach. In October 2017, Robson signed for Bridlington Town. Robson agreed a deal with North Ferriby United in January 2018 that would mark a return to his former club as assistant manager/player. This return would also see Robson linking back up with old teammate Chris Bolder.

On 14 May 2019, it was announced, that Robson once again would link up with Bolder as his assistant manager at North Ferriby.
