= USSF Division 2 Professional League =

Soccer league

- Founded: 2010
- Folded: 2010
- Country: United States
- Other club(s) from: Canada, Puerto Rico
- Confederation: CONCACAF
- Conferences: USL Conference; NASL Conference
- Number of clubs: 12
- Level on pyramid: 2
- Domestic cup(s): U.S. Open Cup; Canadian Championship
- Last champions: Puerto Rico Islanders (2010)
- Website: USSF D2 Pro League at ussoccer.com

The USSF Division 2 Professional League (D2 Pro League) was a temporary professional soccer league created by the United States Soccer Federation (USSF) for the 2010 season. The twelve-team league was formed as a compromise between the feuding United Soccer Leagues (USL) and the North American Soccer League (NASL). The D2 Pro League was the second tier of the United States soccer league system below Major League Soccer. The league also included two clubs from Canada and one club from Puerto Rico.

== History ==
On August 27, 2009, Nike agreed to sell their stake in the United Soccer Leagues to investment company NuRock, instead of Jeff Cooper, who had aligned with a group of USL First Division team owners. Disappointed with the sale and state of the league, the ownership group broke away after the 2009 season with the intent to form a new incarnation of the North American Soccer League. The leagues sued each other, but ultimately withdrew their lawsuits and agreed to mediate with the United States Soccer Federation.

The USSF found that three of the NASL teams (NSC Minnesota Stars, Rochester Rhinos, and FC Tampa Bay) had binding contracts to play in the USL First Division in 2010, leaving the NASL with too few teams to be sanctioned. However, this left the USL First Division with only six teams, also too few for sanctioning. The USSF stripped the USL First Division of its sanctioning, and denied sanctioning to the NASL. After a week of negotiations among the three, the USSF agreed to run a 12-team interim league for 2010. The six extant teams in each league would each occupy their own conference, but teams belonging to both leagues would play each other.

== Teams ==
Team	City	Stadium	Founded	Head coach
USL Conference
Austin Aztex	Austin, Texas	House Park	2008	Adrian Heath
NSC Minnesota Stars	Blaine, Minnesota	National Sports Center	2009	Manny Lagos
Portland Timbers	Portland, Oregon	PGE Park	2001	Gavin Wilkinson
Puerto Rico Islanders	Bayamón, Puerto Rico	Juan Ramón Loubriel Stadium	2003	Colin Clarke
Rochester Rhinos	Rochester, New York	Marina Auto Stadium	1996	Bob Lilley
FC Tampa Bay	Tampa, Florida	George M. Steinbrenner Field	2008	Perry Van der Beck (interim)
NASL Conference
Carolina RailHawks FC	Cary, North Carolina	WakeMed Soccer Park	2006	Martin Rennie
Crystal Palace Baltimore	Catonsville, Maryland	Ridley Athletic Complex	2006	Jim Cherneski
Miami FC	Miami, Florida	FIU Stadium, Lockhart Stadium	2006	Daryl Shore
Montreal Impact	Montreal, Quebec	Saputo Stadium	1992	Marc Dos Santos
AC St. Louis	Fenton, Missouri	Anheuser-Busch Center	2009	Dale Schilly
Vancouver Whitecaps FC	Burnaby, British Columbia	Swangard Stadium	1986	Teitur Thordarson

== Competition format ==
=== Pods ===
It was announced that the season would be centered around what are called pods. The pods were constructed around geographic regions and did not follow conference lines. Teams within the same pod played each other four times, twice at home and twice away. Teams played one team outside of their pod four times, twice at home and twice away, and played the rest of the teams outside their pod twice, once at home and once away. This resulted in a thirty-game season for each team, and had the additional advantage of reducing travel costs. The season ended a playoff format to crown a league champion.

Pod	Teams
1	NSC Minnesota Stars; Portland Timbers; AC St. Louis; Vancouver Whitecaps FC
2	Crystal Palace Baltimore; Carolina RailHawks FC; Montreal Impact; Rochester Rhinos
3	Austin Aztex; Miami FC; Puerto Rico Islanders; FC Tampa Bay

=== Playoff format ===
At the end of the regular season, the top teams in each conference qualified for the playoffs as the top two seeds. In addition, the remaining six teams with the highest point totals, regardless of conference, also advanced to the playoffs.

Each round of the playoffs was a two-game aggregate goal series (the away goals rule was not applied as a tie-breaker). In the event that the aggregate score is tied after the second game of the series, the teams played two 15-minutes periods of extra time. If the score is still tied after extra time, the series was to be decided by a penalty shootout.

== 2010 season ==
USSF Division 2 Professional League
- Season: 2010
- Champions: Puerto Rico Islanders (1st Title)
- Premiers: Rochester Rhinos (3rd Title)
- Matches: 180
- Goals: 437 (2.43 per match)
- Best Player: (United States) Ryan Pore Portland Timbers
- Top goalscorer: (United States) Ryan Pore Portland Timbers (15 goals)
- Best goalkeeper: (United States) Jay Nolly Vancouver Whitecaps
- Biggest home win: POR 3–0 STL (Apr 22); STL 3–0 MTL (Jul 10); MTL 3–0 STL (Jul 21); STL 3–0 POR (Jul 28); POR 3–0 CPB (Aug 29); CAR 3–0 CPB (Sep 3); ROC 3–0 TAM (Sep 11); MTL 3–0 TAM (Sep 19); TAM 6–3 CPB (Oct 1)
- Biggest away win: CPB 0–5 MTL (Aug 21)
- Highest scoring: TAM 6–3 CPB (Oct 1)
- Longest winning run: Rochester Rhinos (6 games, ended Aug 27)
- Longest unbeaten run: Portland Timbers (10 games, to end the season)
- Longest winless run: FC Tampa Bay (11 games, ended Oct 1)
- Longest losing run: Crystal Palace Baltimore (8 games, to end the season)
- Highest attendance: Portland Timbers (15,418; 4 times)
- Lowest attendance: Crystal Palace Baltimore (507, Aug 4)
- Average attendance: 4,449

=== NASL Conference standings ===
NASL Conference
Pos	Team	Pld	W	L	T	GF	GA	GD	Pts	Qualification
1	Carolina RailHawks FC	30	13	9	8	44	32	+12	47	Conference leader, qualified for playoffs
2	Vancouver Whitecaps FC	30	10	5	15	32	22	+10	45	Qualified for playoffs (Note: The remaining six teams with the highest point totals, regardless of conference, also advance to the playoffs.)
3	Montreal Impact	30	12	11	7	36	30	+6	43	Qualified for playoffs
4	Miami FC	30	7	11	12	37	49	−12	33	
5	AC St. Louis	30	7	15	8	32	48	−16	29	
6	Crystal Palace Baltimore	30	6	18	6	24	55	−31	24	

Source: USSF D-2 schedule table

=== USL Conference standings ===
USL Conference
Pos	Team	Pld	W	L	T	GF	GA	GD	Pts	Qualification
1	Rochester Rhinos	30	16	8	6	38	24	+14	54	Conference leader, qualified for playoffs
2	Austin Aztex	30	15	7	8	53	40	+13	53	Qualified for playoffs (Note: The remaining six teams with the highest point totals, regardless of conference, also advance to the playoffs.)
3	Portland Timbers	30	13	7	10	34	23	+11	49	Qualified for playoffs
4	NSC Minnesota Stars	30	11	12	7	32	36	−4	40	Qualified for playoffs
5	Puerto Rico Islanders	30	9	11	10	37	35	+2	37	Qualified for playoffs
6	FC Tampa Bay	30	7	12	11	41	46	−5	32	

Source: USSF D-2 schedule table

=== Playoff standings ===
USSF Division 2 Pro League
Pos	Team	Pld	W	L	T	GF	GA	GD	Pts	Qualification
1	Rochester Rhinos	30	16	8	6	38	24	+14	54	Conference leaders, qualified for playoffs
2	Carolina Railhawks FC	30	13	9	8	44	32	+12	47	Conference leaders, qualified for playoffs
3	Austin Aztex	30	15	7	8	53	40	+13	53	Qualified for playoffs (Note: The remaining six teams with the highest point totals, regardless of conference, also advance to the playoffs.)
4	Portland Timbers	30	13	7	10	34	23	+11	49	Qualified for playoffs
5	Vancouver Whitecaps FC	30	10	5	15	32	22	+10	45	Qualified for playoffs
6	Montreal Impact	30	12	11	7	36	30	+6	43	Qualified for playoffs
7	NSC Minnesota Stars	30	11	12	7	32	36	−4	40	Qualified for playoffs
8	Puerto Rico Islanders (C)	30	9	11	10	37	35	+2	37	Qualified for playoffs
9	Miami FC	30	7	11	12	37	49	−12	33	
10	FC Tampa Bay	30	7	12	11	41	46	−5	32	
11	AC St. Louis	30	7	15	8	32	48	−16	29	
12	Crystal Palace Baltimore	30	6	18	6	24	55	−31	24	

Source: USSF D-2 schedule table
(C) Champions

=== Match results ===
Color Key: Home • Away • Win • Loss • Draw
Club	Match																													
Club	1	2	3	4	5	6	7	8	9	10	11	12	13	14	15	16	17	18	19	20	21	22	23	24	25	26	27	28	29	30
Austin Aztex (AUS)	MTL	STL	ROC	MIN	TAM	CPB	TAM	MIA	CPB	PUE	POR	VAN	MIA	MIA	PUE	ROC	STL	MIA	TAM	PUE	CAR	POR	VAN	MIN	PUE	TAM	STL	STL	CAR	MTL
Austin Aztex (AUS)	2–0	2–1	1–2	2–1	2–2	2–1	3–3	3–1	2–0	2–1	0–0	1–2	3–1	2–1	1–1	0–0	2–0	3–1	4–2	0–2	3–2	1–1	2–2	2–0	1–3	1–1	1–2	4–2	1–3	0–2
Carolina RailHawks (CAR)	STL	MIN	ROC	MIA	TAM	PUE	MTL	POR	VAN	CPB	MTL	STL	PUE	MTL	ROC	ROC	VAN	MTL	ROC	CPB	MIA	AUS	TAM	PUE	CPB	POR	MIN	CPB	PUE	AUS
Carolina RailHawks (CAR)	2–0	0–1	1–1	1–1	1–2	2–1	2–0	1–1	1–1	1–1	2–2	2–0	2–0	0–1	1–0	0–1	2–2	2–0	0–2	1–2	2–1	2–3	2–1	2–3	3–0	0–0	0–1	4–2	2–1	3–1
Crystal Palace Baltimore (CPB)	TAM	PUE	STL	VAN	POR	AUS	ROC	POR	AUS	MIA	ROC	CAR	MIN	MIN	PUE	ROC	MTL	STL	MTL	MIA	MTL	CAR	ROC	MTL	POR	CAR	VAN	CAR	POR	TAM
Crystal Palace Baltimore (CPB)	0–1	1–3	0–1	0–0	1–0	1–2	1–0	2–1	0–2	3–3	1–2	1–1	1–3	1–0	0–2	0–0	2–1	0–1	1–1	0–1	0–0	2–1	0–2	0–5	0–3	0–3	0–3	2–4	1–3	3–6
Miami FC (MIA)	ROC	VAN	TAM	CAR	MIN	MIN	AUS	PUE	MTL	CPB	POR	AUS	AUS	TAM	POR	VAN	PUE	TAM	AUS	CPB	PUE	TAM	CAR	ROC	STL	MTL	ROC	STL	ROC	PUE
Miami FC (MIA)	1–1	0–0	1–1	1–1	1–1	1–0	1–3	2–4	1–1	3–3	1–0	1–3	1–2	1–1	0–2	1–3	1–1	0–2	1–3	1–0	1–1	3–3	1–2	1–3	1–3	2–1	2–1	4–2	1–0	1–1
NSC Minnesota Stars (MIN)	VAN	CAR	PUE	TAM	ROC	AUS	MTL	MIA	MIA	TAM	STL	ROC	MTL	POR	POR	CPB	CPB	TAM	STL	PUE	VAN	STL	POR	VAN	POR	AUS	STL	CAR	VAN	TAM
NSC Minnesota Stars (MIN)	0–2	1–0	1–3	1–0	0–3	1–2	1–2	1–1	0–1	1–3	3–2	0–0	1–0	1–0	0–2	3–1	0–1	1–0	2–2	1–1	1–1	2–2	2–2	0–1	0–1	0–2	3–0	1–0	1–0	3–1
Montreal Impact (MTL)	AUS	POR	PUE	MIN	VAN	POR	CAR	MIA	MIN	TAM	ROC	CAR	VAN	ROC	STL	CAR	CPB	STL	VAN	CPB	CAR	CPB	ROC	CPB	ROC	PUE	MIA	TAM	VAN	AUS
Montreal Impact (MTL)	0–2	1–1	1–0	2–1	0–0	1–0	0–2	1–1	0–1	2–1	1–1	2–2	1–2	1–2	0–3	1–0	1–2	3–0	0–1	1–1	0–2	0–0	1–2	5–0	2–0	2–1	1–2	3–0	1–0	2–0
Portland Timbers (POR)	ROC	STL	MTL	VAN	CPB	STL	MTL	CPB	CAR	AUS	MIA	MIN	MIN	TAM	VAN	MIA	VAN	STL	TAM	ROC	MIN	STL	MIN	AUS	CPB	PUE	CAR	PUE	CPB	VAN
Portland Timbers (POR)	1–0	3–0	1–1	2–1	0–1	1–1	0–1	1–2	1–1	0–0	0–1	0–1	2–0	1–0	0–0	2–0	2–1	0–3	2–2	0–1	2–2	1–0	1–0	1–1	3–0	1–0	0–0	1–0	3–1	2–2
Puerto Rico Islanders (PUE)	MIN	CPB	MTL	CAR	TAM	MIA	AUS	STL	VAN	TAM	ROC	AUS	CPB	CAR	TAM	MIA	MIN	ROC	MIA	TAM	AUS	STL	CAR	POR	VAN	MTL	AUS	POR	CAR	MIA
Puerto Rico Islanders (PUE)	3–1	3–1	0–1	1–2	1–2	4–2	1–2	0–1	1–1	1–0	0–3	1–1	2–0	0–2	0–0	1–1	1–1	3–1	1–1	1–1	2–0	1–1	3–2	0–1	0–0	1–2	3–1	0–1	1–2	1–1
Rochester Rhinos (ROC)	MIA	POR	AUS	MIN	CAR	STL	CPB	VAN	VAN	MIN	CPB	MTL	PUE	MTL	AUS	CPB	CAR	TAM	PUE	CAR	POR	CAR	MTL	CPB	MIA	MTL	TAM	MIA	MIA	STL
Rochester Rhinos (ROC)	1–1	0–1	2–1	3–0	1–1	2–1	0–1	0–2	2–1	0–0	2–1	1–1	3–0	2–1	0–0	0–0	0–1	1–0	1–3	1–0	1–0	2–0	2–1	2–0	3–1	0–2	3–0	1–2	0–1	2–1
AC St. Louis (STL)	CAR	AUS	POR	VAN	CPB	ROC	POR	TAM	MIN	PUE	VAN	CAR	VAN	MTL	MIN	AUS	MTL	CPB	POR	MIN	VAN	POR	PUE	TAM	MIA	MIN	AUS	MIA	AUS	ROC
AC St. Louis (STL)	0–2	1–2	0–3	0–1	1–0	1–2	1–1	0–3	2–3	1–0	0–0	0–2	1–1	3–0	2–2	0–2	0–3	1–0	3–0	2–2	0–0	0–1	1–1	2–2	3–1	0–3	2–1	2–4	2–4	1–2
FC Tampa Bay (TAM)	CPB	MIN	MIA	AUS	CAR	AUS	STL	MIN	PUE	VAN	MTL	PUE	POR	MIA	MIN	PUE	ROC	MIA	POR	AUS	PUE	MIA	VAN	CAR	STL	ROC	AUS	MTL	MIN	CPB
FC Tampa Bay (TAM)	1–0	0–1	1–1	2–2	2–1	3–3	3–0	3–1	2–1	0–1	1–2	0–1	0–1	1–1	0–1	0–0	0–1	2–0	2–2	2–4	1–1	3–3	1–1	1–2	2–2	0–3	1–1	0–3	1–3	6–3
Vancouver Whitecaps FC (VAN)	MIN	MIA	STL	POR	CPB	MTL	ROC	ROC	TAM	CAR	AUS	PUE	STL	MTL	POR	STL	MIA	POR	MIN	MTL	CAR	STL	MIN	TAM	AUS	PUE	CPB	MIN	MTL	POR
Vancouver Whitecaps FC (VAN)	2–0	0–0	1–0	1–2	0–0	0–0	2–0	1–2	1–0	1–1	2–1	1–1	0–0	2–1	0–0	1–1	3–1	1–2	1–1	1–0	2–2	0–0	1–0	1–1	2–2	0–0	3–0	0–1	0–1	2–2

Final regular season results. Based on the results at the NASL results table and USL schedule table

== Playoffs ==
Each round was a two-game aggregate goal series. Home teams for the first game of each series listed at the bottom of the bracket.

Quarterfinals
1	Rochester Rhinos	0	2	2
8	Puerto Rico Islanders	2	1	3
4	Portland Timbers	0	1	1
5	Vancouver Whitecaps FC	2	0	2
3	Austin Aztex	0	2	2
6	Montreal Impact	2	3	5
2	Carolina RailHawks FC	0	4	4
7	NSC Minnesota Stars	0	0	0

Semifinals
5	Vancouver Whitecaps FC	0	0	0
8	Puerto Rico Islanders (a.e.t.)	0	2	2
2	Carolina RailHawks FC	0	2	2
6	Montreal Impact	1	0	1

Final
2	Carolina RailHawks FC	0	1	1
8	Puerto Rico Islanders	2	1	3

=== Quarterfinals ===
October 7, 2010	Puerto Rico Islanders	2–0	Rochester Rhinos	Bayamón, Puerto Rico
8:05PM AST	Faña 44'; Foley 77'	Report		Stadium: Bayamón Soccer Complex

October 9, 2010	Rochester Rhinos	2–1 (2–3 agg.)	Puerto Rico Islanders	Rochester, New York
7:00PM EDT	Hoxie 39'; Hamilton 54'	Report	Rivera 21'	Stadium: Marina Auto Stadium; Attendance: 4,620

October 7, 2010	Vancouver Whitecaps FC	2–0	Portland Timbers	Burnaby, British Columbia
7:30PM PDT	Koffie 1'; Nash 13' (pen.)	Report		Stadium: Swangard Stadium; Attendance: 5,018; Referee: Mathieu Bourdeau

October 10, 2010	Portland Timbers	1–0 (1–2 agg.)	Vancouver Whitecaps FC	Portland, Oregon
6:00PM PDT	Marcelin 49'	Report		Stadium: Merlo Field; Attendance: 4,884

October 6, 2010	Montreal Impact	2–0	Austin Aztex	Montreal, Quebec
7:30PM EDT	Gerba 39', 76'	Report		Stadium: Stade Saputo; Attendance: 7,962; Referee: Daniel Belleau

October 9, 2010	Austin Aztex	2–3 (2–5 agg.)	Montreal Impact	Austin, Texas
7:30PM CDT	Griffin 43'; Johnson 57'	Report	Gerba 4', 49'; Sebrango 89'	Stadium: House Park; Attendance: 2,872

October 6, 2010	NSC Minnesota Stars	0–0	Carolina RailHawks FC	Blaine, Minnesota
7:00PM CDT		Report		Stadium: National Sports Center; Attendance: 686

October 9, 2010	Carolina RailHawks FC	4–0 (4–0 agg.)	NSC Minnesota Stars	Cary, North Carolina
7:00PM EDT	Paladini 64'; Gardner 72'; Lowery 84'; Kallman 88' (o.g.)	Report		Stadium: WakeMed Soccer Park; Attendance: 2,556

=== Semifinals ===
October 14, 2010	Puerto Rico Islanders	0–0	Vancouver Whitecaps FC	Bayamón, Puerto Rico
8:05PM AST		Report		Stadium: Bayamón Soccer Complex; Attendance: 2,831

October 17, 2010	Vancouver Whitecaps FC	0–2 (0–2 agg.)	Puerto Rico Islanders	Burnaby, British Columbia
4:00PM PDT		Report	Addlery 113', 120'	Stadium: Swangard Stadium; Attendance: 5,325

October 14, 2010	Montreal Impact	1–0	Carolina RailHawks FC	Montreal, Quebec
7:30PM EDT	Di Lorenzo 35'	Report		Stadium: Stade Saputo; Attendance: 7,502

October 17, 2010	Carolina RailHawks FC	2–0 (2–1 agg.)	Montreal Impact	Cary, North Carolina
5:00PM CDT	Rusin 73'; Heinemann 90'	Report		Stadium: WakeMed Soccer Park; Attendance: 2,869

=== Finals ===
October 24, 2010	Puerto Rico Islanders	2–0	Carolina RailHawks FC	Juan Ramón Loubriel Stadium, Bayamón, Puerto Rico
7:05PM AST	Gbandi 4'; Faña 20'	Report		Attendance: 6,257

October 30, 2010	Carolina RailHawks FC	1–1 (1–3 agg.)	Puerto Rico Islanders	WakeMed Soccer Park, Cary, North Carolina
7:00PM EST	Heinemann 10'	Report	Gbandi 7'	Attendance: 5,074

== Statistical leaders ==
=== Top scorers ===
Rank	Player	Nation	Club	Goals
1	Ryan Pore	USA	Portland Timbers	15
2	Eddie Johnson	ENG	Austin Aztex	14
3	Aaron King	USA	FC Tampa Bay	12
4	Bright Dike	NGA	Portland Timbers	10
4	Maxwell Griffin	USA	Austin Aztex	10
6	Mike Ambersley	USA	AC St. Louis	9
6	David Foley	ENG	Puerto Rico Islanders	9
6	Ali Gerba	CAN	Montreal Impact	9
6	Abe Thompson	USA	Miami FC	9
10	Paulo Araujo Jr.	BRA	Miami FC	8
10	Etienne Barbara	MLT	Carolina RailHawks	8
10	Leonardo Di Lorenzo	ARG	Montreal Impact	8
10	Isaac Kissi	GHA	Rochester Rhinos	8

=== Top assists ===
Rank	Player	Nation	Club	Assists
1	Luke Kreamalmeyer	USA	AC St. Louis	8
1	Martin Nash	CAN	Vancouver Whitecaps	8
3	Leonardo Di Lorenzo	ARG	Montreal Impact	7
3	Jamie Watson	USA	Austin Aztex	7
5	Yordany Álvarez	CUB	Austin Aztex	5
5	Sandy Gbandi	LBR	Puerto Rico Islanders	5
5	Leonard Griffin	USA	Austin Aztex	5
5	Maxwell Griffin	USA	Austin Aztex	5
5	Andrew Hoxie	USA	Rochester Rhinos	5
5	Lawrence Olum	KEN	Austin Aztex	5
5	Ryan Pore	USA	Portland Timbers	5
5	Tyler Rosenlund	CAN	Rochester Rhinos	5
5	Cornelius Stewart	VIN	Vancouver Whitecaps	5

== Individual awards ==
Award	Winner	Club	Ref.
Most Valuable Player	(United States) Ryan Pore	Portland Timbers	
Defender of the Year	(United States) Greg Janicki	Vancouver Whitecaps	
Goalkeeper of the Year	(United States) Jay Nolly	Vancouver Whitecaps	
Rookie of the Year	(United States) Maxwell Griffin	Austin Aztex FC	
Coach of the Year	(United States) Bob Lilley	Rochester Rhinos	

Best XI
Goalkeeper	Defenders	Midfielders	Forwards
(United States) Jay Nolly (VAN)	(United States) Greg Janicki (VAN) (United States) Aaron Pitchkolan (ROC) (United States) Troy Roberts (ROC)	(United States) Ryan Pore (POR) (Canada) Martin Nash (VAN) (United States) Jamie Watson (AUS) (Brazil) Paulo Araujo Jr. (MIA) (United States) Daniel Paladini (CAR)	(England) Eddie Johnson (AUS) (Canada) Ali Gerba (MTL)
