= 2011 Rochester Rhinos season =

Rochester Rhinos
2011 season
- Owner: (United States) Rob Clark
- Head coach: (United States) Bob Lilley
- Stadium: Sahlen's Stadium
- Playoffs: TBD
- U.S. Open Cup: Third Round
- Highest home attendance: 5,958 vs Charleston 7 May 2011
- Lowest home attendance: 3,027 vs Wilmington 27 May 2011
- Average home league attendance: 5,138
Home colours	Away colours

Rochester Rhinos will play their sixteenth season in professional soccer and their first in the newly created USL Pro

== Roster ==
as of April 13, 2011

Note: Flags indicate national team as defined under FIFA eligibility rules; some limited exceptions apply. Players may hold more than one non-FIFA nationality.

No.	Pos.	Nation	Player
1	GK	USA	Neal Kitson
2	DF	USA	Tyler Bellamy
3	MF	USA	Drew Cost
4	DF	USA	Will Traynor
5	MF	USA	Alfonso Motagalvan
6	DF	USA	Rich Costanzo
7	FW	USA	Anthony Hamilton
8	MF	CAN	Tyler Rosenlund
9	FW	TRI	Kendall Jagdeosingh
10	FW	HAI	Max Ferdinand
11	MF	USA	Frank Alesci
12	DF	USA	Troy Roberts
13	DF	USA	Quavas Kirk

No.	Pos.	Nation	Player
15	DF	USA	Connor Tobin
16	MF	HAI	Kénold Versailles
17	MF	USA	Brad Stisser
18	MF	GHA	Isaac Kissi
20	FW	USA	T. J. Gore
21	MF	USA	Tony Donatelli
22	MF	HAI	Yveson Etienne
23	FW	USA	Andrew Hoxie
25	GK	USA	Ryan Kenny
27	MF	USA	Michael Tanke
28	DF	USA	Anthony Stovall
29	MF	USA	J. C. Banks
31	GK	USA	Joe Marino

== Staff ==
(United States) Bob Lilley (2010–present)

== Schedule and results ==
=== Pre-season ===
Date	Home team	Away team	Score
03-17-11	Rochester Rhinos	SUNY Binghamton	0-0
03-19-11	Rochester Rhinos	York University	2-1
03-26-11	St. Bonaventure	Rochester Rhinos	
03-31-11	Rochester Rhinos	University at Buffalo	2-0
04-02-11	Rochester Rhinos	Pittsburgh	
04-09-11	Harrisburg City Islanders	Rochester Rhinos	

=== 2011 U.S. Open Cup ===
Date	Home team	Away team	Score
06-14-11	Rochester Rhinos	Phoenix SC	2-1
06-21-11	Harrisburg City Islanders	Rochester Rhinos	0-1
06-28-11	Rochester Rhinos	Chicago Fire	0-1

=== Regular season ===
Pos	Team	Pld	W	T	L	GF	GA	GD	Pts	Qualification
1	Rochester Rhinos (A)	24	12	4	8	31	23	+8	40	2011 USL Pro Playoffs (Note: The top four clubs in each division are guaranteed spots in the 2011 USL PRO Playoffs.)
2	Harrisburg City Islanders (A)	24	10	7	7	37	30	+7	37	2011 USL Pro Playoffs
3	Los Angeles Blues (A)	24	8	9	7	34	29	+5	33	2011 USL Pro Playoffs
4	Pittsburgh Riverhounds (A)	24	7	6	11	23	32	−9	27	2011 USL Pro Playoffs
5	F.C. New York	24	6	7	11	27	37	−10	25	
6	Dayton Dutch Lions	24	2	6	16	21	54	−33	12	

Source: USL Pro official standings
Rules for classification: Points, then tiebreak: 1) Head-to-head record based on total points in League games, 2) Total wins in League games, 3) Goal difference in League games, 4) Goals scored in League games, etc.
(A) Advances to USL Pro Playoffs

=== Match results ===
April 15, 2011 Match 1	Richmond Kickers	1-0	Rochester Rhinos	Richmond, Virginia
19:00 EDT	Delicate 24'			Stadium: City Stadium; Attendance: 2049; Referee: Shawn Fitch

April 17, 2011 Match 2	Wilmington Hammerheads	1-0	Rochester Rhinos	Wilmington, North Carolina
14:00 EDT	Mulholland 52'			Stadium: Legion Stadium; Attendance: 1924; Referee: Daniel Burak

April 23, 2011 Match 3	Dayton Dutch Lions	2-3	Rochester Rhinos	Bellbrook, Ohio
19:30 EDT				Stadium: MVS Stadium; Attendance: 1500

May 7, 2011 Match 4	Rochester Rhinos	1-0	Charleston Battery	Rochester, New York
19:00 EDT	Donatelli 25'			Stadium: Sahlen's Stadium; Attendance: 5658

April 30, 2011 Match 5	Harrisburg City	1-0	Rochester Rhinos	Harrisburg, Pennsylvania
19:00 EDT				Stadium: Skyline Sports Complex; Attendance: 1393

May 14, 2011 Match 6	Rochester Rhinos	2-0	Antigua Barracuda F.C.	Rochester, New York
19:00 EDT	Jagdeosingh 53' Rosenlund 60'			Stadium: Sahlen's Stadium; Attendance: 4126; Referee: John Douglas

May 20, 2011 Match 7	Rochester Rhinos	0-0	Orlando City	Rochester, New York
EDT				Stadium: Sahlen's Stadium; Attendance: 4064; Referee: Daniel Radford

May 27, 2011 Match 8	Rochester Rhinos	1-1	Wilmington Hammerheads	Rochester, New York
EDT	Costanzo 65'		Becerra 60'	Stadium: Sahlen's Stadium; Attendance: 3027; Referee: Steve Montanino

May 30, 2011 Match 9	F.C. New York	2-1	Rochester Rhinos	Queens, New York
EDT	Holder Arteaga		Alesci 57'	Stadium: Belson Stadium; Attendance: 1030; Referee: Ayo Obisesan

June 3, 2011 Match 10	Antigua Barracuda F.C.	1-2	Rochester Rhinos	St. John's, Antigua and Barbuda
EDT	Burton 55'		Hoxie 20' Hoxie	Stadium: Sir Vivian Richards Stadium

June 5, 2011 Match 11	Antigua Barracuda F.C.	2-2	Rochester Rhinos	St. John's, Antigua and Barbuda
20:00 EDT	Harvey 1' Burton 65'		Donatelli 65' Kitson	Stadium: Sir Vivian Richards Stadium; Attendance: 1500; Referee: Brian Willette

June 11, 2011 Match 12	Rochester Rhinos	1-0	Harrisburg City	Rochester, New York
17:30 EDT	Jagdeosignh 65'			Stadium: Sahlen's Stadium; Attendance: 4525; Referee: Jason White

June 17, 2011 Match 13	Pittsburgh Riverhounds	0-3	Rochester Rhinos	Bridgeville, Pennsylvania
20:00 EDT			Costanzo 9' Hoxie 26' Cost 42'	Stadium: CVHS Stadium; Attendance: 625; Referee: John Douglas

June 25, 2011 Match 14	Rochester Rhinos	1-0	Dayton Dutch Lions	Rochester, New York
19:00 EDT	Banks 90'			Stadium: Sahlen's Stadium; Attendance: 4633; Referee: Bryan Roslund

July 1, 2011 Match 15	Rochester Rhinos	2-1	Richmond Kickers	Rochester, New York
19:30 EDT	Kissi 47' Jagdeosingh 72'		Bellamy (OG) 56'	Stadium: Sahlen's Stadium; Attendance: 5344; Referee: Jason Pelletier

July 3, 2011 Match 16	Rochester Rhinos	v	Orlando City	Rochester, New York
19:00 EDT				Stadium: Sahlen's Stadium

July 8, 2011 Match 17	Rochester Rhinos	v	F.C. New York	Rochester, New York
EDT				Stadium: Sahlen's Stadium

July 16, 2011 Match 18	Orlando City	v	Rochester Rhinos	Orlando, Florida
EDT				Stadium: Citrus Bowl

July 22, 2011 Match 19	Rochester Rhinos	v	Pittsburgh Riverhounds	Rochester, New York
EDT				Stadium: Sahlen's Stadium

July 29, 2011 Match 20	Charlotte Eagles	v	Rochester Rhinos	Charlotte, North Carolina
EDT				Stadium: Charlotte Christian Stadium

July 30, 2011 Match 21	Charleston Battery	v	Rochester Rhinos	Charleston, South Carolina
EDT				Stadium: Blackbaud Stadium

August 5, 2011 Match 22	Rochester Rhinos	v	Charlotte Eagles	Rochester, New York
EDT				Stadium: Sahlen's Stadium

August 13, 2011 Match 23	Rochester Rhinos	v	Pittsburgh Riverhounds	Rochester, New York
EDT				Stadium: Sahlen's Stadium

== Attendance ==
Highest League Match Attendance	5658
Average League Match Attendance	4339
