= 2012 Rochester Rhinos season =

Rochester Rhinos
2012 season
- Owner: (United States) Rob Clark
- Head coach: (United States) Jesse Myers
- Stadium: Sahlen's Stadium
- USL Pro: 2nd
- USL Pro Playoffs: 2nd Round
- U.S. Open Cup: Third Round
- Top goalscorer: Andrew Hoxie - 6
- Highest home attendance: 7,959
- Lowest home attendance: 4,653
Home colors	Away colors

The 2012 Rochester Rhinos season was the club's seventeenth season of existence. It was the Rhinos' second-consecutive year in the third tier of American soccer, playing in the USL Professional Division for their second season.

== Background ==
After the split of several USL clubs to create the North American Soccer League, United Soccer Leagues restructured its top division, and created the USL Pro, which received third-tier sanctioning from U.S. Soccer. The Rhinos, who had played in the second division of American soccer for their entire existence, opted to join the USL Pro, and thus play in the third tier.

On the field, the Rhinos won their division, and boasted the fourth best overall record, making it the second straight year Rochester were division champions. For the third straight season, however, Rochester was eliminated in the first round of the respective league's playoffs.

Outside of the USL Pro Division, the Rhinos were eliminated in the third round of the 2012 U.S. Open Cup by the MLS side Philadelphia Union. The Rhinos also played a School Day friendly against NPSL team FC Buffalo.

== Competitions ==
=== Preseason Friendlies ===
March 30, 2012	Rochester Rhinos	2 - 0	Colgate University	Sahlen's Stadium, Rochester, New York
	McFayden 55'; Boughton 58'

April 1, 2012	Rochester Rhinos	1 - 0	UB Bulls	Sahlen's Stadium, Rochester, New York
	Bellamy 45'; Bellamy (yellow card) 29'

April 6, 2012	Rochester Rhinos	2 - 1	Syracuse Orange	Sahlen's Stadium, Rochester, New York
	McManus 23'; Rosenlund 55'		Thomas 47'

May 8, 2012	Rochester Rhinos	1-0	FC Buffalo	Sahlen's Stadium, Rochester, New York
	Hemmi 51'			Attendance: 9000

=== USL Pro ===
April 14, 2012 Match 1	Los Angeles Blues	0 - 2	Rochester Rhinos	Fullerton, CA
10:30 PM ET	Irving Garcia (yellow card) 36'		Rosenlund 22'; Rosenlund (yellow card) 21'; Earls (yellow card) 58'	Stadium: Titan Stadium; Attendance: 2,432; Referee: Jesus Cisneros, Eduardo Mariscal, Apolinar Mariscal, Jonathan Hughes

April 20, 2012 Match 2	Los Angeles Blues	0 - 2	Rochester Rhinos	Fullerton, CA
10:30 PM ET	George Davis IV (yellow card) 48'; Borja (yellow card) 90'		Hoxie 50'; Banks 56'; Tanke (yellow card) 87'	Stadium: Titan Stadium; Attendance: 1,388; Referee: Jesus Cisneros, Felisha Mariscal, Adrian Gonzalez, Robert Warsaraz

April 28, 2012 Match 3	Dayton Dutch Lions	0 - 1	Rochester Rhinos	Dayton, OH
7:30 PM ET	Preciado (yellow card) 34'; Knotek (yellow card) 49'; Copier (yellow card) 55'		Banks 67'	Stadium: Careflight Field; Attendance: 853; Referee: Cory Richardson, Pierre Saintil Francillen, Jamie Chierd, Grant Brown

May 5, 2012 Match 4	Rochester Rhinos	1 - 0	Charlotte Eagles	Rochester, NY
7:05 PM ET	Bloom 9' (o.g.)			Stadium: Sahlen's Stadium; Attendance: 7959; Referee: Steve Montanino

May 11, 2012 Match 5	Charlotte Eagles	0 - 1	Rochester Rhinos	Charlotte, NC
8:00 PM ET	Guzman (yellow card) 82'		Chinn 18'; McManus (yellow card) 58'	Stadium: Charlotte Christian Stadium; Attendance: 964; Referee: Daniel Thornberry

May 12, 2012 Match 6	Charleston Battery	0 - 1	Rochester Rhinos	Charleston, SC
7:30 PM ET	Flatley (yellow card) 70'		Earls 61'; McManus (yellow card) 72'	Stadium: Blackbaud Stadium; Attendance: 3819; Referee: Sky Arthur Banning

May 18, 2012 Match 7	Rochester Rhinos	1 - 1	Dayton Dutch Lions	Rochester, NY
7:35 PM ET	Kirk 74'; Roberts (yellow card) 51'		Bardsley 28'	Stadium: Sahlen's Stadium; Attendance: 7414; Referee: David Mon

May 25, 2012 Match 8	Harrisburg City Islanders	1 - 0	Rochester Rhinos	Harrisburg, PA
6:00 PM ET	Langley 48'		Rosenlund (yellow card) 39'; Fernandez (yellow card) 83'	Stadium: Skyline Sports Complex; Referee: Eric Weisbrod

May 26, 2012 Match 9	Dayton Dutch Lions	2 - 2	Rochester Rhinos	Dayton, OH
7:30 PM ET	Garner 34'; Copier 64'		Brito 52'; McManus 90'; Manscuk (yellow card) 30'	Stadium: Careflight Field; Referee: Andrew Bigelow

June 2, 2012 Match 10	Rochester Rhinos	0 - 1	Richmond Kickers	Rochester, NY
7:05 PM ET	Kirk (yellow card) 13'; Cost (yellow card) 61'; Fernandez (yellow card) 90'		Vercollone 5'	Stadium: Sahlen's Stadium; Attendance: 5237; Referee: David Mon

June 8, 2012 Match 11	Rochester Rhinos	1 - 1	Wilmington Hammerheads	Rochester, NY
7:35 PM ET	Rosenlund 30'; Earls (yellow card) 56'; Taynor (yellow card) 61'		Nicholson 68'; Budnyy (yellow card) 41'	Stadium: Sahlen's Stadium; Attendance: 5944; Referee: Vito Testa

June 15, 2012 Match 12	Harrisburg City Islanders	2 - 1	Rochester Rhinos	Harrisburg, PA
6:00 PM ET	Ekra 86'; Mkosana 90'	Report	Roberts (yellow card) 49'; Traynor (yellow card) 77'; Tanke 80'	Stadium: Skyline Sports Complex; Attendance: 1,958; Referee: Michael Donovan

June 17, 2012 Match 13	Pittsburgh Riverhounds	1 - 1	Rochester Rhinos	Pittsburgh, PA
3:00 PM ET	Nuñez 16'	Report	Kirk 60'	Stadium: Highmark Stadium; Attendance: 1,056

June 23, 2012 Match 14	Richmond Kickers	2 - 3	Rochester Rhinos	Richmond, VA
7:00 PM ET	Vercollone 8'; Callahan (yellow card) 45'; Yeisley 82'; Pascale (yellow card) 90'; Nyazamba (red card) 90+3'	Report	Brito 27'; Earls (yellow card) 42'; Tanke (yellow card) 59'; Hoxie 85' (pen.); Banks 90+2'; Nicht (yellow card) 90+4'	Stadium: City Stadium; Attendance: 2,365; Referee: (United States) Shawn Fitch

June 30, 2012 Match 15	Rochester Rhinos	1 - 2	Harrisburg City Islanders	Rochester, NY
7:05 PM ET	Kirk (yellow card) 70'; Banks (yellow card) 75' (goal) 89'; Nicht (yellow card) 90'	Report	Mkosana 52'; Yates 83'	Stadium: Sahlen's Stadium; Attendance: 6,592; Referee: (United States) John Douglas

July 4, 2012 Match 16	Rochester Rhinos	4 - 1	Antigua Barracuda FC	Rochester, NY
7:55 PM ET	McFayden 3', 18'; Hoxie 76', 80'	Report	Byers 29'; Skepple (yellow card) 85'	Stadium: Sahlen's Stadium; Attendance: 4,653; Referee: (United States) David Mon

July 7, 2012 Match 17	Rochester Rhinos	2 - 0	Dayton Dutch Lions	Rochester, NY
7:05 PM ET	Earls 3'; Kissi 90'	Report	Holowaty (yellow card) 90'	Stadium: Sahlen's Stadium; Attendance: 5,432; Referee: (United States) Marc Lawrence

July 12, 2012 Match 18	Wilmington Hammerheads	0 - 0	Rochester Rhinos	Wilmington, NC
7:30 PM ET	Cole (yellow card) 57'; Chijindu (red card) 79'	Report	Rosenlund (yellow card) 44'; Hoxie (yellow card) 56'	Stadium: Legion Stadium; Attendance: 3,358

July 14, 2012 Match 19	Orlando City	4 - 0	Rochester Rhinos	Orlando, FL
7:30 PM ET	Luzunaris 10' (yellow card) 23'; Jérôme 15'; Valentino 27'; López 73' (pen.)	Report	Chris Estridge (yellow card) 16'; Kyle Manscuk (yellow card) 33'; Roberts (yellow card) 51'; Lucas Fernandez (yellow card) 69'	Stadium: Citrus Bowl; Attendance: 7,260

July 21, 2012 Match 20	Rochester Rhinos	2 - 0	Pittsburgh Riverhounds	Rochester, NY
7:05 PM ET	Banks 10'; Hoxie 77'	Report	Costanzo (yellow card) 55'; Katic (yellow card) 85'	Stadium: Sahlen's Stadium; Attendance: 7,221

July 27, 2012 Match 21	Rochester Rhinos	1 - 0	Los Angeles Blues	Rochester, NY
7:35 PM ET	McManus (yellow card) 26'; Hall 60' (o.g.)	Report	Galindo (yellow card) 28'; García (yellow card) 35'	Stadium: Sahlen's Stadium; Attendance: 5,643

August 3, 2012 Match 22	Rochester Rhinos	0 - 1	Orlando City	Rochester, NY
7:35 PM ET	McManus (yellow card) 23'; Banks (yellow card) 56' (yellow-red card) 76'; Rosenlund (yellow card) 74'	Report	Watson 65'; Ustruck (yellow card) 67'; Mbengue (yellow card) 71' (yellow-red card) 80'; Chin (yellow card) 87'	Stadium: Sahlen's Stadium; Attendance: 6,383

August 11, 2012 Match 23	Rochester Rhinos	0 - 4	Charleston Battery	Rochester, NY
7:05 PM ET		Report	Donatelli 18', 30'; Sanyang 45+1'; Kelly 86'	Stadium: Sahlen's Stadium; Attendance: 5,597

August 18, 2012 Match 24	Rochester Rhinos	1 - 0	Pittsburgh Riverhounds	Rochester, NY
7:05 PM ET	Roberts (yellow card) 18'; Hoxie 87'; Tanke (yellow card) 90' (yellow-red card) 90'	Report	Katic (yellow card) 22'; Costanzo (yellow card) 45'; C'deBaca (yellow card) 90'	Stadium: Sahlen's Stadium; Attendance: 7,101

==== Standings ====
Pos	Team	Pld	W	T	L	GF	GA	GD	Pts	Qualification
1	Orlando City SC (C)	24	17	6	1	50	18	+32	57	Commissioner's Cup, Playoffs 1st round bye
2	Rochester Rhinos (A)	24	12	5	7	27	23	+4	41	Playoffs 1st round bye
3	Charleston Battery (A)	24	12	2	10	36	26	+10	38	Playoffs
4	Richmond Kickers (A)	24	11	5	8	31	27	+4	38	Playoffs
5	Wilmington Hammerheads (A)	24	10	7	7	34	32	+2	37	Playoffs
6	Harrisburg City Islanders (A)	24	10	7	7	34	29	+5	37	Playoffs
7	Charlotte Eagles	24	11	3	10	34	26	+8	36	
8	Los Angeles Blues	24	9	3	12	26	29	−3	30	
9	Dayton Dutch Lions	24	4	10	10	20	29	−9	22	
10	Pittsburgh Riverhounds	24	4	5	15	20	39	−19	17	
11	Antigua Barracuda	24	5	1	18	16	50	−34	16	

Source: USL Pro official standings
Rules for classification: Points, then tiebreak: 1) Head-to-head record based on total points in League games, 2) Total wins in League games, 3) Goal difference in League games, 4) Goals scored in League games, etc.
(A) Advances to USL Pro Playoffs; (C) Commissioner's Cup (best regular season record)

==== Results summary ====
Overall								Home						Away					
Pld	W	D	L	GF	GA	GD	Pts	W	D	L	GF	GA	GD	W	D	L	GF	GA	GD
0	0	0	0	0	0	0	0	0	0	0	0	0	0	0	0	0	0	0	0

Last updated: December 17, 2011.
Source: Match reports

Results by round

Round	1	2	3	4	5	6	7	8	9	10	11	12	13	14	15	16	17	18	19	20	21	22	23	24
Stadium																								
Result																								

Source: Match reports
A = Away; H = Home; W = Win; D = Draw; L = Loss

==== USL Pro Play Off ====
August 31, 2012 SF	Rochester Rhinos	1 - 1 (a.e.t.) (3–4 p)	Charleston Battery	Rochester, New York
7:35 pm EDT	McFayden 55'; McManus (yellow card) 57'; Hoxie (yellow card) 76'; Cost (yellow card) 80'; Fernandez (yellow card) 90'	Report; Report	Donatelli 90+'; Hoffer (yellow card) 114'	Stadium: Sahlen's Stadium; Attendance: 3,312; Referee: Vito Testa, Jr.
	Penalties
	Hoxie (penalty missed); Kyriazis (penalty scored); Earls (penalty scored); Zamudio (penalty scored); Roberts (penalty missed); Nicht (penalty missed); Rosenlund (penalty missed)		(penalty scored) Patterson; (penalty missed) Donatelli; (penalty scored) Azira; (penalty missed) Falvey; (penalty scored) Prince; (penalty missed) Wilson; (penalty scored) Mack

=== U.S. Open Cup ===
May 22, 2012 2	Rochester Rhinos	3 - 0	Brooklyn Italians	Rochester, NY
7:35 PM ET	McManus 25'; Chinn 43'; Banks 76'		Kirk (red card) 60'	Stadium: Sahlens Stadium; Attendance: 3,631

May 29, 2012 3	Philadelphia Union	3 - 0	Rochester Rhinos	Chester, Pennsylvania
7:30 PM ET	Martínez 5'; Adu 29'; Adu 73' (pen.)		Earls (yellow card) 40'; Traynor (yellow card) 52'	Stadium: PPL Park; Attendance: 4,175; Referee: Robert Sibiga

== Statistics ==
=== Appearances and goals ===
No.	Pos	Nat	Player	Total		Regular Season		Playoffs		U.S. Open Cup	
No.	Pos	Nat	Player	Apps	Goals	Apps	Goals	Apps	Goals	Apps	Goals

=== Top scorers ===
Position	Nation	Number	Name	USL Pro	U.S. Open Cup	Total

=== Disciplinary record ===
Position	Nation	Number	Name	USL Pro		U.S. Open Cup		Preseason		Total (USSF Total)	
Position	Nation	Number	Name	Yellow card	Red card	Yellow card	Red card	Yellow card	Red card	Yellow card	Red card
TOTALS				—	—	—	—	—	—	—	—

== Roster ==
as of November 28, 2011

No.	Position	Nation	Player
2	DF	USA	Tyler Bellamy
3	MF	USA	Drew Cost
4	DF	USA	Mike Zaher
5	DF	USA	Jack Traynor
6	DF	GRE	Georgios Kyriazis
7	MF	CHI	Gustavo Zamudio
8	MF	CAN	Tyler Rosenlund
10	FW	SCO	Tam McManus
11	FW	USA	Conor Chinn
12	DF	USA	Troy Roberts
13	DF	USA	Quavas Kirk
15	FW	CPV	Graciano Brito
16	MF	IRL	Danny Earls
17	DF	JPN	Masaki Hemmi
18	FW	GHA	Isaac Kissi
20	DF	ARG	Lucas Fernandez
21	DF	USA	Kyle Manscuk
23	GK	USA	Brandon Miller
24	GK	GER	Kristian Nicht
25	FW	USA	Andrew Hoxie
27	MF	USA	Michael Tanke
29	MF	USA	J. C. Banks
31	GK	USA	Joe Marino

== See also ==
- 2012 in American soccer
- 2012 USL Pro season
- Richmond Kickers
