= List of Rochester Rhinos seasons =

Rochester Rhinos, also known as Rochester Raging Rhinos and Rochester New York FC, was an American professional soccer club based in Rochester, New York. Founded in 1996, the club has competed at both the second and third tiers of American soccer. Following a hiatus from 2018 to 2021, the club played one final season in 2022 before folding. The following is a list of each season completed, inclusive of all competitive competitions.

== Key ==
Key to competitions

- MLS Next Pro (MLSNP) – One of three leagues that form the third division of soccer in the United States, established in 2021 with play starting in 2022. MLSNP is operated by the top-level Major League Soccer (MLS) primarily as a home to reserve sides of its teams. RNY is the league's only founding member that is not an MLS reserve side.
- USL Championship (USLC) – The second division of soccer in the United States, established in 2010 and previously known as USL and USL Pro. The Championship was the third division of American soccer from its founding until its elevation to second division status in 2017.
- USSF Division 2 Professional League (D2 Pro) – The second division of soccer in the United States for a single season in 2010, now defunct.
- USL First Division (USL-1) – The second division of soccer in the United States from 2005 through 2009.
- A-League – The second division of soccer in the United States from 1995 through 2004, now defunct.
- U.S. Open Cup (USOC) – The premier knockout cup competition in US soccer, first contested in 1914.
- CONCACAF Champions League (CCL) – The premier competition in North American soccer since 1962. It went by the name of Champions' Cup until 2008.

Key to colors and symbols

1st or W	Winners
2nd or RU	Runners-up
Last	Wooden Spoon
♦	Golden Boot
	Highest average attendance

Key to league record

- Season = The year and article of the season
- Div = Level on pyramid
- League = League name
- Pld = Played
- W = Games won
- L = Games lost
- D = Games drawn
- GF = Goals scored
- GA = Goals against
- Pts = Points
- PPG = Points per game
- Conf = Conference position
- Overall = League position

Key to cup record

- DNE = Did not enter
- DNQ = Did not qualify
- NH = Competition not held or canceled
- QR = Qualifying round
- PR = Preliminary round
- GS = Group stage
- R1 = First round
- R2 = Second round
- R3 = Third round
- R4 = Fourth round
- R5 = Fifth round
- QF = Quarterfinals
- SF = Semifinals
- RU = Runners-up
- W = Winners

== Seasons ==
Season	League											Position		Playoffs	USOC	Continental / other	Average attendance	Top goalscorer(s)	
Season	Div	League	Pld	W	L	D	GF	GA	GD	Pts	PPG	Conf.	Overall	Playoffs	USOC	Continental / other	Average attendance	Name	Goals
1996	2	A-League	27	14	13	0	44	42	+2	42	1.56	N/A	5th	RU	RU	Ineligible	9,991	(United States) Doug Miller	23
1997	2	A-League	28	14	14	0	56	47	+9	42	1.50	2nd	9th	R1	Ro16	Ineligible	10,677	(United States) Doug Miller	23
1998	2	A-League	28	24	4	0	72	15	+57	72	2.57	1st	1st	W	Ro16	Ineligible	11,499	(England) Darren Tilley	21
1999	2	A-League	28	22	6	0	47	20	+27	66	2.36	1st	1st	RU	W	Ineligible	11,551	(Canada) Mauro Biello	8
2000	2	A-League	28	17	9	2	42	25	+17	53	1.89	3rd	6th	W	Ro16	Ineligible	11,628	(United States) Yari Allnutt	10
2001	2	A-League	26	16	6	4	43	27	+16	52	2.00	2nd	3rd	W	R2	Ineligible	10,789	(South Africa) Lenin Steenkamp	9
2002	2	A-League	28	17	8	3	38	25	+13	54	1.93	2nd	4th	SF	Ro16	Ineligible	10,008	(South Africa) Lenin Steenkamp	8
2003	2	A-League	28	15	7	6	55	36	+19	51	1.82	3rd	7th	SF	Ro16	Ineligible	10,169	(United States) Doug Miller	17
2004	2	A-League	28	15	10	3	36	32	+4	48	1.71	4th	5th	QF	QF	Ineligible	10,200	(United States) Chris Carrieri	8
2005	2	USL-1	28	15	7	6	45	27	+18	51	1.82	N/A	2nd	SF	QF	Ineligible	9,791	(United States) Kirk Wilson	9
2006	2	USL-1	28	13	4	11	34	21	+13	50	1.79	N/A	2nd	RU	Ro16	Ineligible	10,110	(England) Matthew Delicâte	8
2007	2	USL-1	28	12	10	6	39	36	+3	42	1.50	N/A	5th	QF	Ro16	Ineligible	9,705	(Ivory Coast) Hamed Modibo Diallo	9
2008	2	USL-1	30	11	10	9	35	32	+3	41	1.37	N/A	4th	SF	Ro16	Ineligible	8,243	(Liberia) Johnny Menyongar	6
2009	2	USL-1	30	11	9	10	34	32	+2	43	1.43	N/A	6th	QF	SF	DNQ	6,888	(Liberia) Johnny Menyongar	11
2010	2	D2 Pro	30	16	8	6	38	24	+14	54	1.80	1st	1st	QF	Ro16	DNQ	6,464	(Ghana) Isaac Kissi	8
2011	3	USL Pro	24	12	8	4	31	23	+8	40	1.67	1st	4th	SF	Ro16	DNQ	5,339	(United States) Andrew Hoxie (Trinidad and Tobago) Kendall Jagdeosingh	5
2012	3	USL Pro	24	12	7	5	27	23	+4	41	1.71	N/A	2nd	SF	R3	DNQ	6,233	(United States) Andrew Hoxie	6
2013	3	USL Pro	26	6	10	10	25	39	–14	28	1.08	N/A	11th	DNQ	R3	DNQ	5,876	(Scotland) Tam McManus	7
2014	3	USL Pro	28	10	10	8	29	25	+4	38	1.46	N/A	6th	QF	Ro16	DNQ	5,972	(United States) J.C. Banks	9
2015	3	USL	28	17	1	10	40	15	+25	61	2.18	1st	1st	W	R4	DNQ	5,599	(Cape Verde) Steevan Dos Santos	9
2016	3	USL	30	13	5	12	38	25	+13	51	1.70	4th	6th	QF	R4	DNQ	3,655	(United States) Christian Volesky	10
2017	2	USL	32	14	7	11	36	28	+8	53	1.66	4th	9th	QF	R4	DNQ	2,031	(United States) Jochen Graf	11
2018– 2021	On hiatus																		
2022	3	MLSNP	24	10	8	6	37	30	+7	40	1.67	4th	9th	QF	R4	DNQ	N/A	(United States) Gibran Rayo	13
Total	–	–	639	326	181	132	921	649	+272	1113	1.74	–	–	–	–	–	–	(United States) Doug Miller	75

1. Avg. attendance only includes statistics from regular season matches.
2. Top goalscorer(s) includes all goals scored in the regular season, playoffs, U.S. Open Cup, and other competitive matches.
3. Points and PPG have been adjusted from non-traditional to traditional scoring systems for seasons prior to 2003 to more effectively compare historical team performance across seasons.
4. Pts in 2008 excludes one deducted point for fielding an ineligible player.
