= 2010 Rochester Rhinos season =

Rochester Rhinos played their fifteenth season in professional soccer and first in the temporary USSF D2 Pro League in 2010.

== Roster ==
as of June 16, 2010

Note: Flags indicate national team as defined under FIFA eligibility rules; some limited exceptions apply. Players may hold more than one non-FIFA nationality.

No.	Pos.	Nation	Player
1	GK	USA	Neal Kitson
2	DF	USA	Tyler Bellamy
3	DF	USA	Adam West
4	MF	USA	Aaron Pitchkolan
5	MF	USA	Alfonso Motagalvan
6	DF	USA	Rich Costanzo
7	FW	USA	Anthony Hamilton
8	MF	USA	Jamie Franks
9	MF	USA	Darren Spicer
10	MF	USA	Carlos Aguilar
11	MF	USA	Ryan Heins
12	DF	USA	Troy Roberts
13	MF	CAN	Tyler Rosenlund

No.	Pos.	Nation	Player
15	DF	USA	Frank Sanfilippo (captain)
16	MF	HAI	Kénold Versailles
17	DF	ENG	Nathaniel Short
18	MF	GHA	Isaac Kissi
20	FW	USA	T. J. Gore
21	FW	HAI	Max Ferdinand
23	FW	USA	Andrew Hoxie
24	GK	USA	Scott Vallow
25	FW	USA	Tino Nuñez
27	MF	CAN	Ian Bennett
28	MF	RSA	Jonathan Greenfield

=== Staff ===
(United States) Bob Lilley (2010–present)

== Schedule and results ==
=== 2010 U.S. Open Cup ===
Date	Home team	Away team	Score
06-15-10	Rochester Rhinos	Dayton Dutch Lions	2 - 0
06-22-10	Rochester Rhinos	Pittsburgh Riverhounds	3 - 0
06-29-10	Columbus Crew	Rochester Rhinos	2 - 1

=== Regular season ===
USL Conference
Pos	Team	Pld	W	L	T	GF	GA	GD	Pts	Qualification
1	Rochester Rhinos	30	16	8	6	38	24	+14	54	Conference leader, qualified for playoffs
2	Austin Aztex	30	15	7	8	53	40	+13	53	Qualified for playoffs (Note: The remaining six teams with the highest point totals, regardless of conference, also advance to the playoffs.)
3	Portland Timbers	30	13	7	10	34	23	+11	49	Qualified for playoffs
4	NSC Minnesota Stars	30	11	12	7	32	36	−4	40	Qualified for playoffs
5	Puerto Rico Islanders	30	9	11	10	37	35	+2	37	Qualified for playoffs
6	FC Tampa Bay	30	7	12	11	41	46	−5	32	

Source: USSF D-2 schedule table
Notes:

Date	Home team	Away team	Score	Attendance
4-10-10	Miami FC	Rochester Rhinos	1-1	1,235
4-17-10	Portland Timbers	Rochester Rhinos	1-0	15,418
4-25-10	Austin Aztex	Rochester Rhinos	1-2	2,819
4-28-10	NSC Minnesota Stars	Rochester Rhinos	0-3	627
5-01-10	Rochester Rhinos	Carolina RailHawks	1-1	7,124
5-08-10	Rochester Rhinos	AC St Louis	2-1	1,447
5-19-10	Rochester Rhinos	Crystal Palace Baltimore	0-1	4,447
5-22-10	Vancouver Whitecaps	Rochester Rhinos	2-0	4,996
5-29-10	Rochester Rhinos	Vancouver Whitecaps	2-1	7,744
6-04-10	Rochester Rhinos	NSC Minnesota Stars	0-0	5,284
6-12-10	Rochester Rhinos	Crystal Palace Baltimore	2-1	6,676
6-20-10	Montreal Impact	Rochester Rhinos	1-1	11,920
6-26-10	Rochester Rhinos	Puerto Rico Islanders	3-0	7,012
7-3-10	Rochester Rhinos	Montreal Impact	2-1	6,505
7-9-10	Rochester Rhinos	Austin Aztex	0-0	4,544
7-14-10	Crystal Palace Baltimore	Rochester Rhinos	0-0	757
7-17-10	Rochester Rhinos	Carolina RailHawks	0-1	7,339
7-22-10	FC Tampa Bay	Rochester Rhinos	0-1	3,882
7-24-10	Puerto Rico Islanders	Rochester Rhinos	3-1	1,322
7-27-10	Carolina RailHawks	Rochester Rhinos	0-1	2,212
8-04-10	Rochester Rhinos	Portland Timbers	1-0	6,978
8-11-10	Carolina RailHawks	Rochester Rhinos	0-2	2,305
8-14-10	Rochester Rhinos	Montreal Impact	2-1	7,717
8-18-10	Crystal Palace Baltimore	Rochester Rhinos	0-2	850
8-21-10	Rochester Rhinos	Miami FC	3-1	9,157
8-27-10	Montreal Impact	Rochester Rhinos	2-0	13,034
9-11-10	Rochester Rhinos	FC Tampa Bay	3-0	8,197
9-17-10	Rochester Rhinos	Miami FC	1-2	6,794
9-25-10	Miami FC	Rochester Rhinos	1-0	1,126
10-02-10	AC St Louis	Rochester Rhinos		
