= Ryan Kenny =

American soccer player (born 1987)

Personal information
- Full name: Ryan Jeffrey Brown Kenny
- Date of birth: September 11, 1987 (age 39)
- Place of birth: Livermore, California, United States
- Height: 6 ft 3 in (1.91 m)
- Position: Goalkeeper

Youth career
- Buchanan High School

College career
Years	Team	Apps	(Gls)
2005	UC Santa Barbara Gauchos	0	(0)
2006–2009	Sacramento State Hornets		

Senior career*
Years	Team	Apps	(Gls)
2008–2010	Fresno Fuego	29	(0)
2011	Rochester Rhinos	1	(0)
Total		30	(0)

Managerial career
- 2018–2019: Fresno FC (goalkeeping)
- * Club domestic league appearances and goals

Ryan Jeffrey Brown Kenny (born September 11, 1987) is an American former professional soccer player.

== Early life and education ==
Kenny was born September 11, 1987, in Livermore, California. He played high school soccer at Buchanan High School in Clovis, California.

Kenny attended the University of California, Santa Barbara and was a student-athlete on the UC Santa Barbara Gauchos men's soccer team. He battled to serve as backup to incumbent UCSB starter Kyle Reynish, but ultimately redshirted and made no appearances.

Kenny transferred to California State University, Sacramento after his first season and it was announced that Kenny would join the Sacramento State Hornets men's soccer team in March 2006. He played for the Hornets for four seasons and on his departure ranked third all-time in career saves (160) and goals against average (1.49).

== Playing career ==
During his college years, Kenny also played several seasons for Fresno Fuego of the USL Premier Development League, leading them to a league title and a National Semi-Final appearance to be named Co-Defensive player of the year.

After graduating from Sacramento State, Kenny spent 2010 training with Major League Soccer side Real Salt Lake.

In February 2011, Kenny signed his first professional contract with the Rochester Rhinos in the USL Pro. Former UCSB teammates Tyler Rosenlund and Alfonso Motagalvan were teammates. He made his professional debut on May 10, 2011, in a game against the Harrisburg City Islanders, which was his only USL Pro appearance for the club. He made one further appearance for the Rhinos, a 2011 Lamar Hunt U.S. Open Cup game on June 14, 2011, against Phoenix SC, which was his last professional appearance.

In the offseason, Kenny suffered injuries to both shoulders and was not able to compete again.

== Career statistics ==
Club	Season	League			Playoffs		Cup		Continental		Total	
Club	Season	Division	Apps	Goals	Apps	Goals	Apps	Goals	Apps	Goals	Apps	Goals
Fresno Fuego	2008	PDL	14	0	1	0	—		—		15	0
Fresno Fuego	2009	PDL	14	0	—		—		—		14	0
Fresno Fuego	2010	PDL	1	0	—		—		—		1	0
Rochester Rhinos	2011	USL Pro	1	0	0	0	1	0	—		2	0
Career total			30	0	1	0	1	0	—		32	0
