= Salunga-Landisville, Pennsylvania =

Salunga-Landisville
- CDP
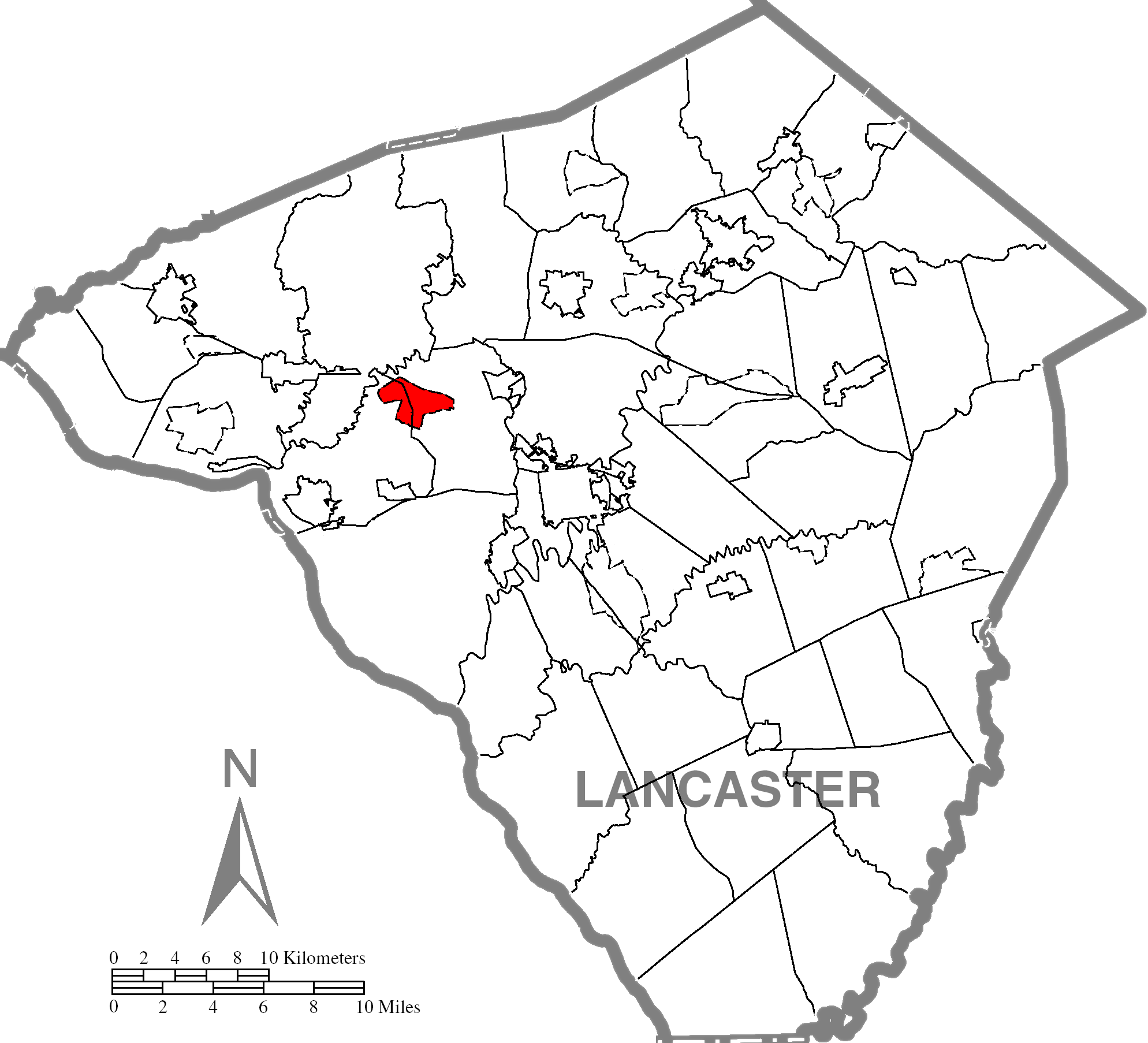
- Location within Lancaster county

- Location within the U.S. state of Pennsylvania Salunga-Landisville (the United States)
- Coordinates: 40°5′42″N 76°24′57″W
- Country: United States
- State: Pennsylvania
- County: Lancaster

Area
  - Total: 3.1 sq mi (7.9 km^{2})
  - Land: 3.1 sq mi (7.9 km^{2})

Population (2000)
  - Total: 4,771
  - Density: 1,600/sq mi (600/km^{2})
- Time zone: UTC-5 (Eastern (EST))
  - Summer (DST): UTC-4 (EDT)

Salunga-Landisville consists of two census-designated places (CDPs) in Lancaster County, Pennsylvania, United States with a zip code of 17538. As of the 2010 United States census the population of Salunga CDP was 2,695 people and the population of Landisville CDP was 1,893 people for a combined total of 4,588, a decrease of about 3.8% from the 2000 United States census which recorded 4,771 in the Salunga-Landisville CDP. The name "Salunga" comes from the nearby Chiquesalunga (now Chickies) Creek, which in turn is derived from the Lenape "Chiquesalunga", meaning "place of the crayfish". Landisville is named for John Landis, the first postmaster there.

== Geography ==
Salunga-Landisville is located at 40°5′42″N 76°24′57″W (40.094876, -76.415805).

According to the United States Census Bureau, the CDP has a total area of 3.0 square miles (7.8 km^{2}), all of it land.

== Demographics ==
As of the census of 2000, there were 4,771 people, 1,763 households, and 1,394 families residing in the CDP. The population density was 1,567.2 inhabitants per square mile (605.1/km^{2}). There were 1,780 housing units at an average density of 584.7 per square mile (225.8/km^{2}). The racial makeup of the CDP was 96.06% White, 1.07% African American, 1.74% Asian, 0.48% from other races, and 0.65% from two or more races. Hispanic or Latino of any race were 1.63% of the population.

There were 1,763 households, out of which 39.4% had children under the age of 18 living with them, 69.5% were married couples living together, 7.3% had a female householder with no husband present, and 20.9% were non-families. 17.2% of all households were made up of individuals, and 7.7% had someone living alone who was 65 years of age or older. The average household size was 2.70 and the average family size was 3.06.

In the CDP, the population was spread out, with 27.5% under the age of 18, 5.3% from 18 to 24, 30.0% from 25 to 44, 25.4% from 45 to 64, and 11.8% who were 65 years of age or older. The median age was 39 years. For every 100 females, there were 97.5 males. For every 100 females age 18 and over, there were 91.7 males.

The median income for a household in the CDP was $55,495, and the median income for a family was $66,955. Males had a median income of $45,849 versus $34,875 for females. The per capita income for the CDP was $24,258. About 0.8% of families and 1.0% of the population were below the poverty line, including none of those under age 18 and 3.9% of those age 65 or over.

== Parks ==
Landisville and Salunga are home to two parks: Amos Herr Park, and Salunga Park. Each has a pavilion. Amos Herr Park also has tennis courts, a basketball court, a volleyball court, two baseball fields, playgrounds, and large grass fields for soccer and other activities.

== Sports ==
Club	League	Venue	Established	Championships
Lancaster Inferno	NPSL Soccer	Hempfield High School	2008	

Landisville is the home of the Lancaster Inferno, a soccer club with teams in the National Premier Soccer League and the Women's Premier Soccer League, both of which are FIFA-recognized Division IV leagues. Both Inferno teams play at Hempfield High School's stadium, recently renovated with artificial turf.

== See also ==
- Hempfield High School
- Lancaster Inferno (NPSL)
- Lancaster Inferno (WPSL)
