= Steve Klein (soccer) =

American soccer player & coach (born 1975)

Personal information
- Date of birth: May 11, 1975 (age 51)
- Place of birth: Evansville, Indiana, U.S.
- Height: 6 ft 2 in (1.88 m)
- Position: Midfielder

Youth career
- 1993–1996: Bowling Green Falcons

Senior career*
Years	Team	Apps	(Gls)
1997	New England Revolution	4	(0)
1997	→ Worcester Wildfire (loan)	6	(2)
1998	Nashville Metros	28	(8)
1999–2001	Hershey Wildcats	68	(13)
2002–2004	Charleston Battery	84	(8)
2005–2007	Vancouver Whitecaps	78	(9)

Managerial career
- 2008: Lancaster Inferno
- * Club domestic league appearances and goals

Steve Klein (born May 11, 1975) is an American soccer coach and former professional player, who spent one season in Major League Soccer and eleven in the USL First Division and its predecessors. On January 20, 2010, he was ranked 24th in the USL First Division Top 25 of the Decade, which announced a list of the best and most influential players of the previous decade.

== Player ==
=== Youth ===
Klein was born in Evansville, Indiana, and attended Brentwood High School in Brentwood, TN and Bowling Green State University in Ohio, where he started all four years and earned first team All-American honors his senior year. He is still BGSU's all-time leading point scorer with 45 assists and 37 goals. His play led BGSU to the "Sweet Sixteen" of the NCAA Championships in both his junior and senior years. In 2006, Klein was inducted in the BGSU Athletic Hall of Fame.

=== Professional ===
Klein was drafted by the New England Revolution in the third round of the 1997 MLS College Draft but saw limited action due to injury. During the season, he played six games on loan to the Worcester Wildfire. In 1998, he spent the season with the Nashville Metros. In 1999, he moved to the Hershey Wildcats for two seasons. On December 19, 2001, he signed with the Charleston Battery, where he played for three seasons.

In 2005, Klein made the cross-country move to the Vancouver Whitecaps, where he started 26 of 27 games and was second on the team in scoring with 18 pts (7 goals, 4 assists). He earned first team USL for his efforts. In the 2006 campaign, he moved into a more defensive midfield role, starting all games eligible (27) and leading the team in minutes played during the regular season. While not producing the scoring totals of 2005, his hard work in the trenches earned him second team USL honors. He helped the Whitecaps win their first USL First Division championship by beating the Rochester Raging Rhinos 3–0.

== Coaching career ==
In 2008, Klein was the head coach of the now-defunct Lancaster Inferno in the National Premier Soccer League.

== Honors ==
=== Charleston Battery ===
- USL First Division Championship: 2003

=== Vancouver Whitecaps ===
- USL First Division Championship: 2006
- Cascadia Cup: 2005
