= Altidor =

Altidor is a surname. Notable people with the surname include:

- Mackenson Altidor (born 1984), Bahamian footballer
- Paul Altidor (fl. 2012), American diplomat
