= Bob Lilley (soccer, born 1966) =

American soccer coach (born 1966)

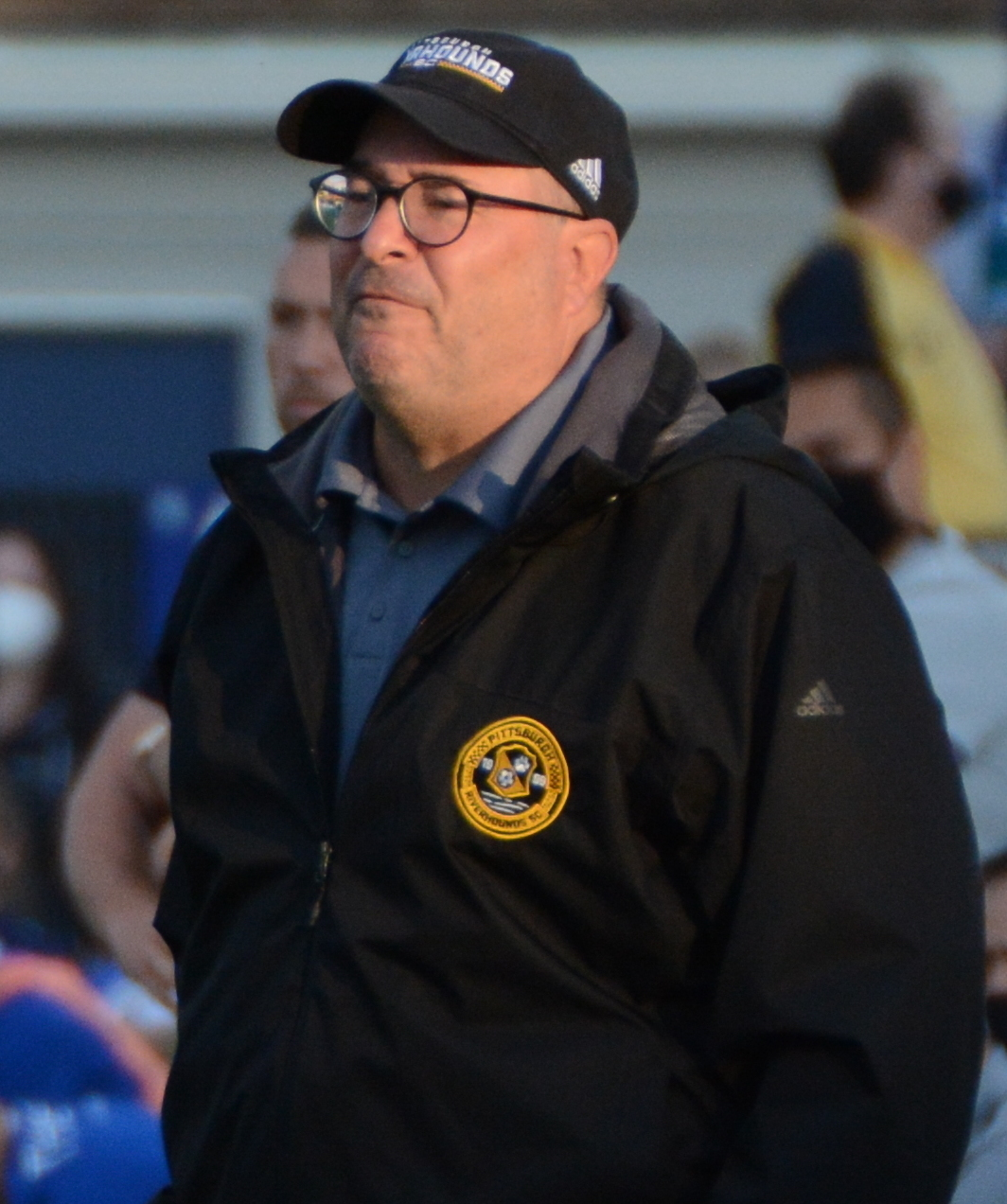
- Lilley with Pittsburgh Riverhounds in 2021

Personal information
- Full name: Robert Lilley
- Date of birth: May 2, 1966 (age 60)
- Place of birth: Fort Monmouth, New Jersey, United States
- Position: Midfielder

College career
Years	Team	Apps	(Gls)
1984–1987	George Mason Patriots	82	

Senior career*
Years	Team	Apps	(Gls)
1988–19??	Hershey Impact (indoor)		
1989–1990	Orlando Lions		
1989–1991	Maryland Bays		
1990–1991	Hershey Impact (indoor)		
1992–1997	Harrisburg Heat (indoor)	173	(73)
1994	Pittsburgh Stingers (indoor)	26	(14)

Managerial career
- 1997–2001: Hershey Wildcats
- 2002–2003: Montreal Impact
- 2004–2007: Vancouver Whitecaps
- 2007–2008: Detroit Ignition
- 2009–2011: Rochester Rhinos
- 2014–2017: Rochester Rhinos
- 2018–2025: Pittsburgh Riverhounds
- * Club domestic league appearances and goals

Robert "Bob" Lilley (born May 2, 1966) is an American soccer coach and former player. From 1997 to 2025, he managed the Hershey Wildcats, Montreal Impact, Vancouver Whitecaps, Detroit Ignition, Rochester Rhinos, and Pittsburgh Riverhounds.

A former midfielder, he played collegiately at George Mason before appearing at the professional level for Orlando Lions and Maryland Bays and indoors with Hershey Impact, Harrisburg Heat, and Pittsburgh Stingers.

== Early life ==
Bob Lilley was born on May 2, 1966, in Fort Monmouth, New Jersey. He grew up in Carlisle, Pennsylvania and attended Carlisle High School. He played for the Carlisle High varsity soccer team for all four years of high school, and usually featured as a forward or midfielder.

== Playing career ==
Bob Lilley attended George Mason University and played for the George Mason Patriots from 1984 to 1987. As a freshman, he played in midfield, but moved to a defensive role starting in his sophomore year. He played in 82 games for the Patriots, which was the second-most appearances in school history as of 2021. Lilley served as team captain for the Patriots. Lilley graduated from George Mason in spring of 1988.

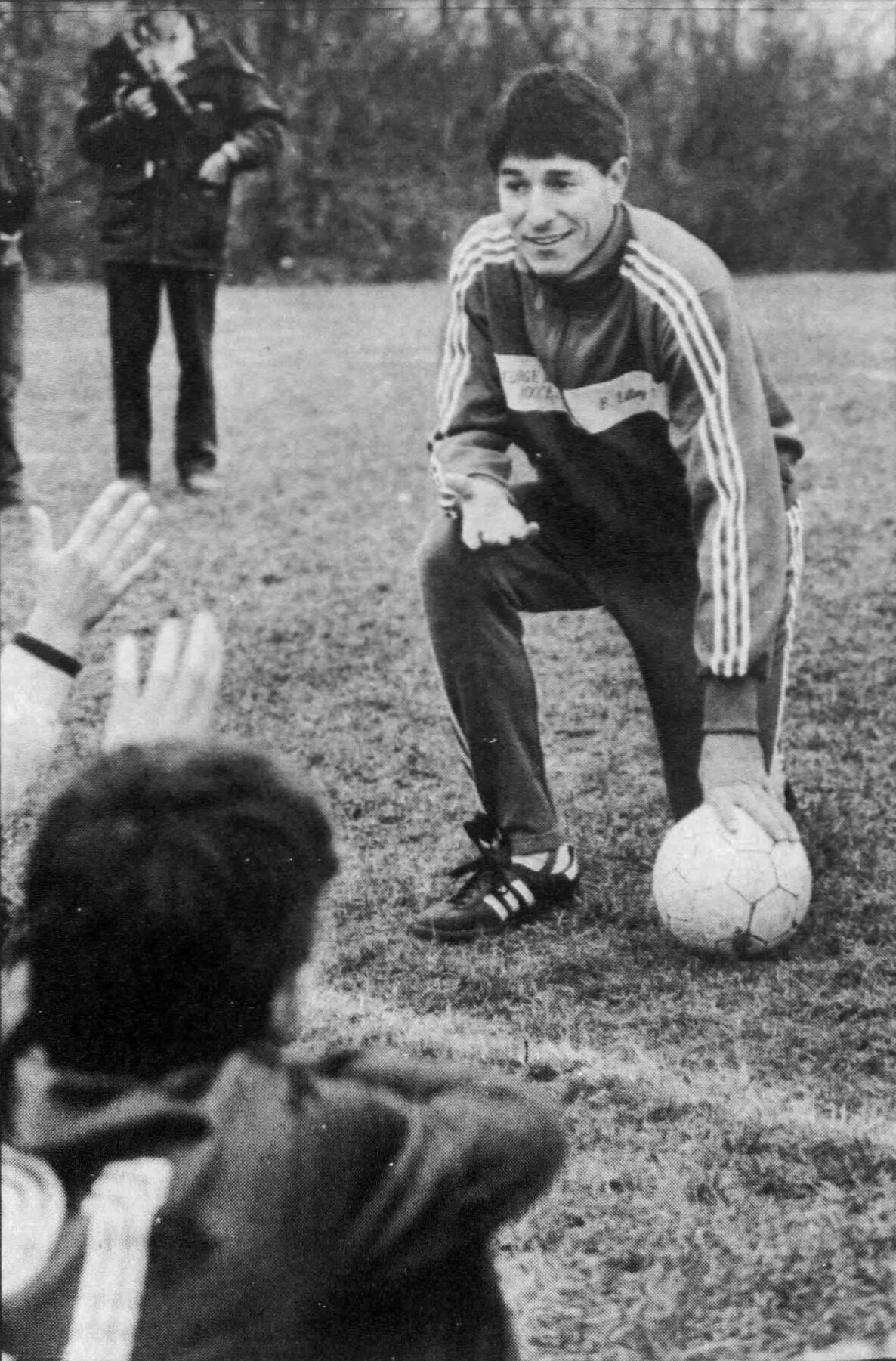
Lilley teaching young soccer players at a YMCA clinic in 1988

In October 1988, Lilley signed with American Indoor Soccer Association expansion team Hershey Impact.

In 1989, Lilley signed with the Orlando Lions of the American Soccer League. In 1990, the ASL merged with the Western Soccer Alliance to form the American Professional Soccer League. Lilley spent the 1990 season with the Lions in the new APSL. In the fall of 1990, he joined the Hershey Impact of the National Professional Soccer League.

In 1992, he moved to the Harrisburg Heat. In 1994, he spent the summer indoor season with the Pittsburgh Stingers in the Continental Indoor Soccer League. Following the 1996–97 NPSL season, Lilley retired from playing and entered the coaching ranks. He played his final home match for the Heat on January 18, 1997.

== Coaching career ==
Lilley officially became head coach of the USISL A-League expansion franchise Hershey Wildcats on January 20, 1997, immediately following his retirement as a player the weekend prior. He would remain the team's coach through its entire five-year existence. He led Hershey to the playoffs each year, as well winning A-League coach of the year in his rookie season. He was able to guide Hershey to one Northern Conference and three Atlantic Division titles as well as the 2001 A-League National Championship final, which they lost 2–0 to the Rochester Raging Rhinos. After the 2001 season, the team was folded by the ownership, having decided that the team would not be successful financially.

On January 23, 2002, he was appointed the new head coach of the Montreal Impact signing on a two-year contract. His first season with the Impact, the team finished first in the Northeast Division, and also claimed the Voyageurs Cup. In 2003, he led Montreal to the Eastern Conference title and, the Voyageurs Cup for the second time in a row. And for the second time in his career he wins the A-League Coach of the Year, becoming only the second two-time Coach of the Year recipient in league history, following Alan Hinton in 1994, and 1995.

After the 2003 season he left the Impact for personal reasons, eventually signing a two-year deal with the Vancouver Whitecaps on November 1, 2004, becoming the team's first American coach, and the first coach never to have previously played for Vancouver.

He led Vancouver to the playoffs in 2004 but were eliminated in the quarterfinals, but were able to claim the Cascadia Cup. In 2006, he led the Whitecaps to their first North American championship since 1979, when they defeated the Raging Rhinos 3–0 at PAETEC Park becoming the first team in USL First Division history to win the title on the road.

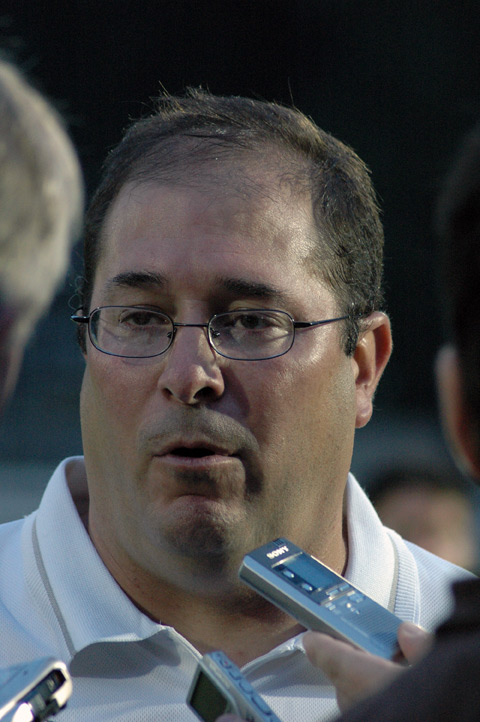
Lilley in 2008

Lilley was sacked as Vancouver Whitecaps head coach on September 18, 2007, two days after the Whitecaps were eliminated by the Portland Timbers in the first round of the United Soccer Leagues First Division playoffs. He was hired by the Detroit Ignition of the Major Indoor Soccer League as their assistant coach afterwards and promoted to head coach on November 6, 2007.

On November 16, 2009, the Rochester Rhinos announced the hiring of Lilley as the club's new head coach for the 2010 season.

During their match on January 25, 2013, the new Harrisburg Heat of the Professional Arena Soccer League honored Lilley with a halftime ceremony for his service with the original Heat franchise in the mid-1990s.

Jesse Myers took Lilley's coaching position with the Rochester Rhinos starting in the 2012 season. However, Lilley was rehired by the Rhinos for the 2014 season. He remained with the Rochester Rhinos through the end of the 2017 season.

As Rochester's 2018 season looked increasingly shaky following years of declining attendance, Lilley departed the club to become the head coach of the Pittsburgh Riverhounds. The Rochester Rhinos would ultimately go on hiatus for the 2018 season, and Lilley would be joined in Pittsburgh by Rhinos assistant coach Mark Pulisic as well as many of the players on the Rhinos squad.

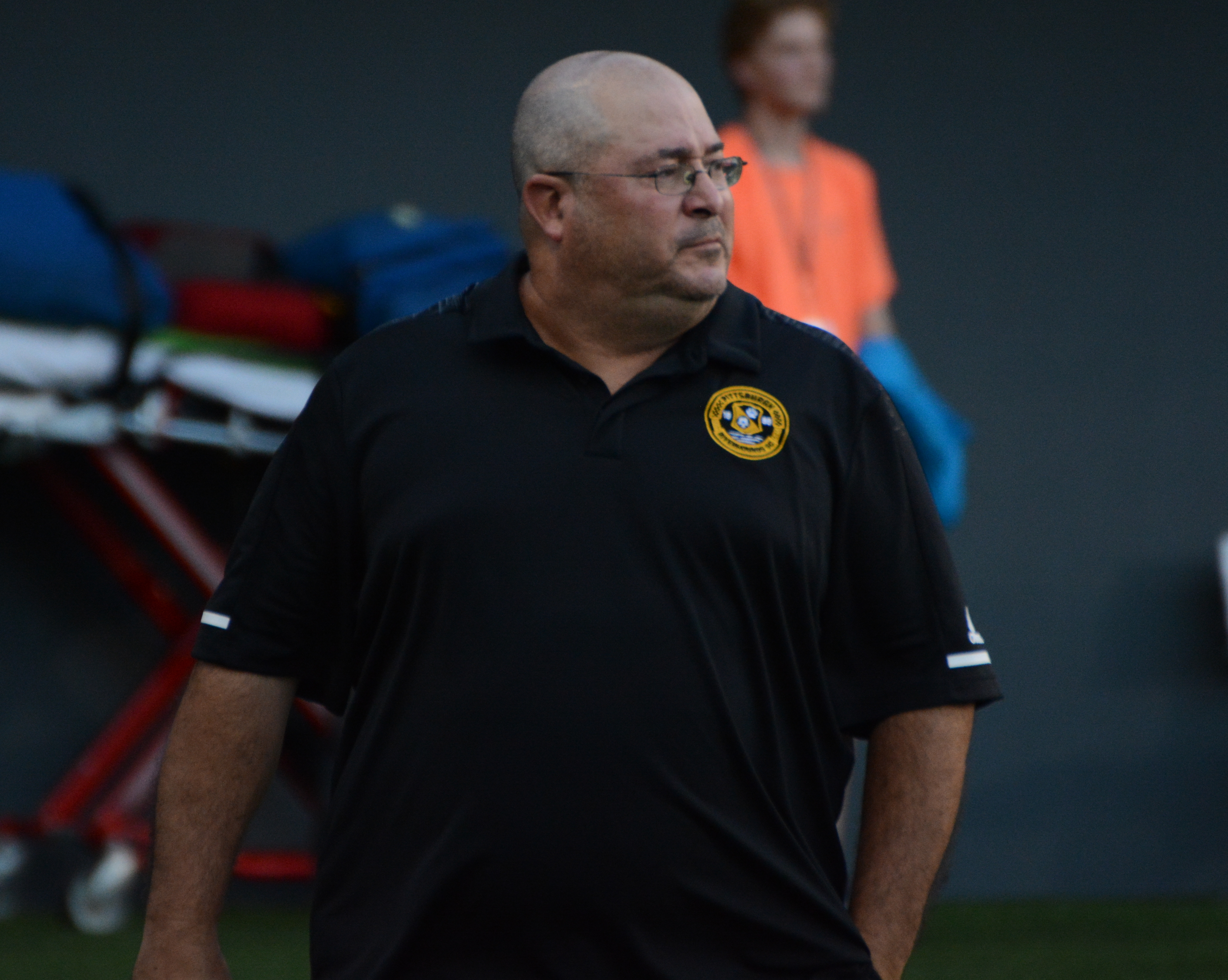
Lilley at a Riverhounds game in 2018

Under Lilley's coaching, the Riverhounds underwent drastic improvement when compared to the prior two seasons, in which the club had finished with a losing record. The Riverhounds held a clean sheet through the first four matches, the first time the club had achieved such a streak since the United Soccer League formed in 2011. The team went undefeated for their first ten matches before finally posting their first loss on May 30, 2018. Lilley told reporters after a May 26 draw that he remained unhappy with the team's performance, as only four of those unbeaten matches were wins and the team was in 4th place on the Eastern Conference standings. However, the team would go on to win five of their next six matches after the May 30 loss before posting their next loss. As of August 12, 2018, the Riverhounds hold a 12–3–7 record, putting them in 2nd place in the Eastern Conference behind FC Cincinnati.

Lilley and the Riverhounds won the USL Championship Player's Shield with the top record in the league at the close of the 2023 regular season, but fell to Detroit City FC in the playoff quarterfinals.

The Riverhounds announced on October 10, 2025 that Lilley was place on administrative leave.

== Coaching stats ==
Team	From	To	Record				
Team	From	To	G	W	L	T	Win %
Hershey Wildcats	April 29, 1997	September 8, 2001	140	86	46	6	61.43
Montreal Impact	April 26, 2002	September 7, 2003	56	32	15	9	57.14
Vancouver Whitecaps	April 24, 2005	September 18, 2007	84	33	20	31	39.29
Detroit Ignition	November 6, 2007	April 2008	30	22	8	–	73.33
Rochester Rhinos	November 16, 2009	September 15, 2011	54	28	16	10	51.85
Pittsburgh Riverhounds*	November 14, 2017	Present	203	101	57	45	49.75

- Note: Pittsburgh statistics are through July 1, 2024.

Preceded by Position created	Hershey Wildcats Head Coach; 1997–2001	Succeeded by team folded
Preceded by Mark Pulisic	Detroit Ignition Head Coach; 2007–2008	Succeeded by Matt Johnson
