= Lucas Fernández (footballer, born 1988) =

Argentine footballer

Personal information
- Full name: Lucas Ezequiel Fernández
- Date of birth: July 20, 1988 (age 38)
- Place of birth: Buenos Aires, Argentina
- Height: 1.75 m (5 ft 9 in)
- Position: Right-back

Team information
- Current team: Chaco For Ever

Youth career
- 1998–2007: Argentinos Juniors

Senior career*
Years	Team	Apps	(Gls)
2007–2010	Argentinos Juniors		
2011	Jorge Wilstermann		
2011–2012	Projreso	9	(0)
2012–2014	Rochester Rhinos	34	(0)
2014	Independiente Fontana		
2015	Unión Aconquija	30	(0)
2015	Chaco For Ever	8	(0)
2016–2019	Gimnasia Mendoza	60	(2)
2019–2020	Alvarado	9	(0)
2021	Sportivo Peñarol	18	(3)
2022–	Chaco For Ever	26	(0)
- * Club domestic league appearances and goals as of 13:55, 14 August 2022 (UTC)

Lucas Ezequiel Fernández (born July 20, 1988, in Buenos Aires) is an Argentine footballer currently playing for Chaco For Ever.
