= Lancaster Inferno =

Lancaster Inferno may refer to one of two soccer teams based in Lancaster, Pennsylvania:

- Lancaster Inferno (NPSL), a defunct men's team which played in 2008 in the National Premier Soccer League
- Lancaster Inferno (UWS), a women's team established in 2008, currently playing in the United Women's Soccer league
