= Buchanan High School (Clovis, California) =

Public high school in California, United States

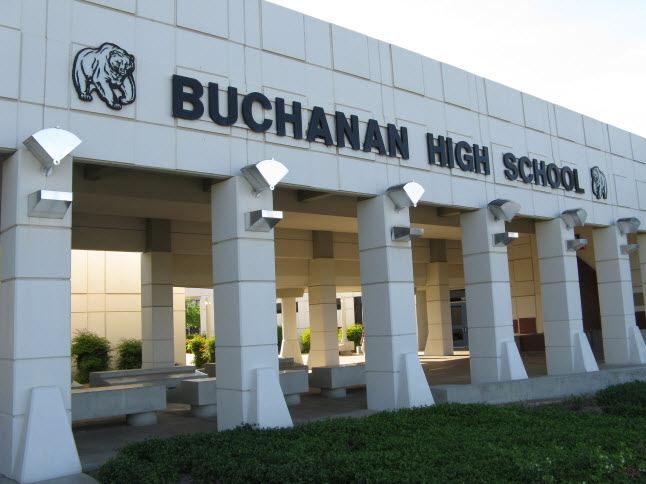

Location
- 1560 North Minnewawa Avenue; Clovis, California 93619; United States; 36.8580°N 119.7144°W

Information
- Type: Public High School
- Opened: 1991
- School district: Clovis Unified School District
- NCES School ID: 060903000367
- Principal: Omar Hemaidan
- Teaching staff: 117.59 (FTE)
- Grades: 9–12
- Enrollment: 2,606 (2023-2024)
- Student to teacher ratio: 22.16
- Colors: Air Force Blue and Red
- Athletics conference: CIF Central Section Division 1 TRAC (Tri River Athletic Conference)
- Team name: Bears
- Rival: Clovis High, Clovis North Educational Center, Clovis West, Clovis East High School
- Accreditation: WASC
- Website: bhs.cusd.com

Dr. Floyd B. Buchanan High School, known as Buchanan High School, is a four-year public high school in Clovis, California, United States. The school is part of the Buchanan Educational Center, which houses approximately 5,000 students at Garfield Elementary School (K-6), Alta Sierra Intermediate School (7-8), and Buchanan High School. The school graduated its first class in the spring of 1995, and is named after CUSD's first district superintendent, Dr. Floyd B. Buchanan, which makes Buchanan High School the only CUSD high school that does not contain "Clovis" in its name.

== Academics ==
Buchanan High School fields academic teams in Science Olympiad, FRC Robotics, Mock Trial, Academic Decathlon, Science Bowl, and Forensics. The high school offers fifteen AP classes as well as six honors classes, two comprehensive four-year foreign language programs, and a variety of performing and visual arts classes including drama, photography, ceramics, art, videography, choir, orchestra, color guard, and band among others. Additionally, students have the option of, as a Junior or Senior, taking vocationally-oriented courses through the Regional Occupational Training program or CART high school.

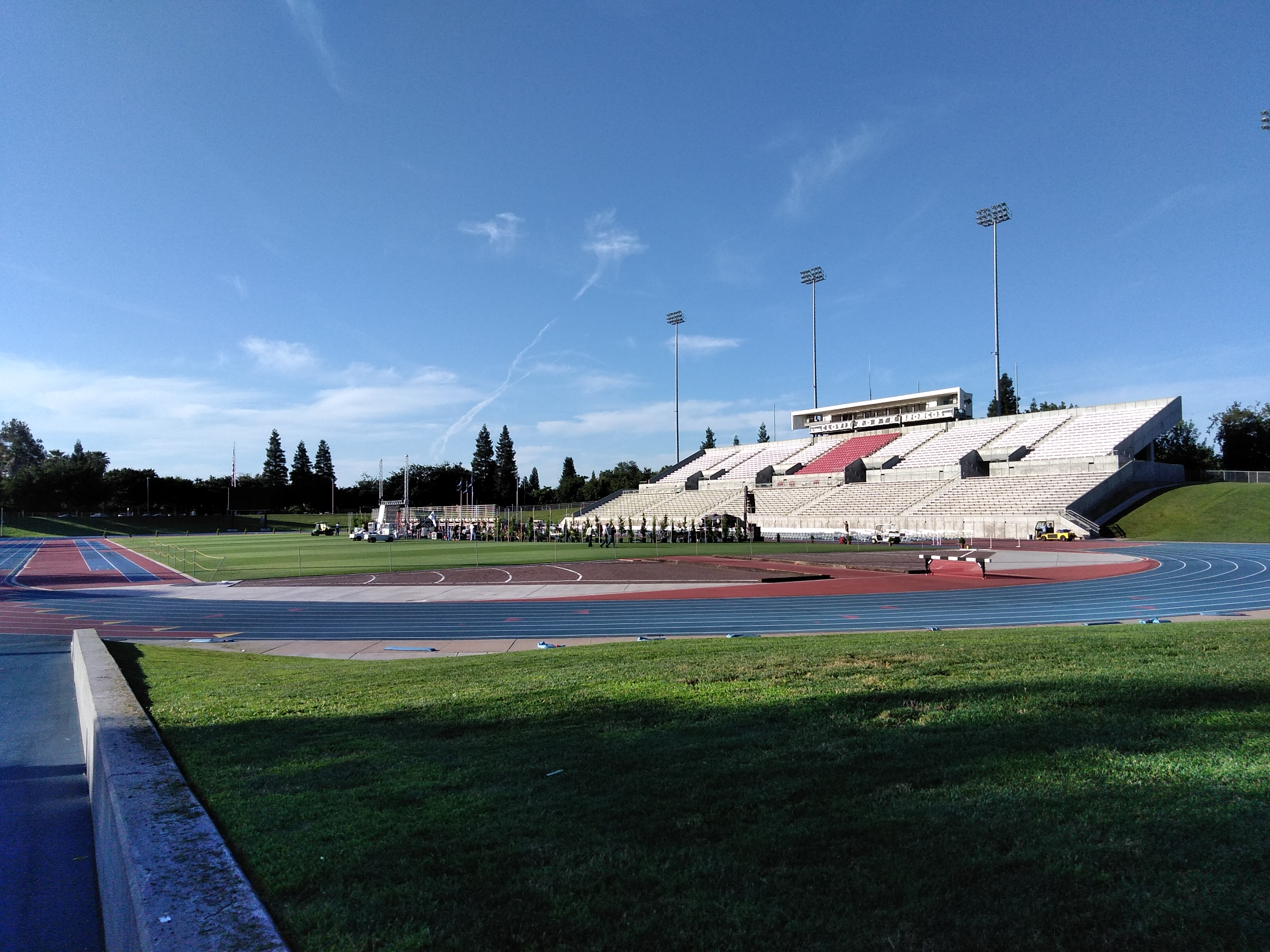
The Veterans Memorial Stadium is used for Football, Band Competition, Track & Field, and Graduation Ceremonies.

== Facilities ==
The school has the largest campus in CUSD.

Years after the Track & Field/Football Stadium opened for use, it was renamed Veterans Memorial Stadium after the numerous Buchanan Students that have died in the Iraq & Afghanistan wars.

== Test scores and honors ==
The school is a National Blue Ribbon School and a California Distinguished School. In 2022 according to U.S. News & World Report Buchan High School was ranked as the 241st best high school in the state and the 4th best in Fresno County.

== Athletics ==
- Buchanan was awarded "California Athletic High School of the Year" in 05–06.
- The Bears received "Special Mention State School of the Year" by CalHiSports for their athletic success in 07-08 and 08- 09.
- The Bears wrestling team was State Champions in the 2005–2006 season. The Bears Baseball Team was awarded the Powerade Fab50 National Champions title for the 2010–2011 season.
- The Men's Volleyball team were Maxpreps Top-Ranked team in CA in 2011.

Varsity Athletics

Boys

- Fall: Football, Water Polo, Cross Country
- Winter: Soccer, Basketball, Wrestling
- Spring: Baseball, Tennis, Swimming and Diving, Track and Field, Volleyball

Girls

- Fall: Gymnastics, Water Polo, Tennis, Cross Country, Volleyball, Golf
- Winter: Soccer, Basketball
- Spring: Badminton, Track and Field, Softball, Swimming and Diving

== Activities ==
The marching band has won awards and trophies in the Western Band Association and Northern California Band Association. Under the direction of Key Poulan, both concert wind ensembles were selected to perform at Carnegie Hall in New York City, April 14, 2001.

The jazz band has produced several recordings, and has gone to the Monterey Next-Generation Jazz Festival in 2007, 2008, 2009, 2010, 2011, 2012, 2013, and in 2014 of which they placed 2nd in the nation. They have also performed at the Monterey Jazz Festival in 2007, 2008, and 2014.

In May 2006, all four choir groups won 1st Gold at the spring festival and were given the prestigious Sweepstakes Award, earning the title of best high school choir on the entire West Coast that year. Similarly, in 2008 the groups placed 1st and 2nd and were duly noted for their outstanding work.

In 2007, the high school created a memorial garden memorializing alumni who died while serving in the United States armed forces, including 8 who died in either Afghanistan or Iraq.

In 2015, the school's robotics team, along with 3 other high school teams from around the country, won the FIRST Robotics Competition Championship in St. Louis, making them world champions.

The school also has an award-winning National History Day team and a nationally ranked pep & cheer program.

Buchanan High School is also known for its nationally recognized Space Mission simulation, titled Columbia Space. This program was started to expose students to the wonders of space, as well as to honor the crew members on the Space Shuttle Columbia. In the program, students create an entire mission, from planning experiments to training and selecting astronauts, by themselves. The Columbia Space Mission had a downlink with the International Space Station with Astronaut Greg Chamitoff.

Buchanan High school won the national, state and valley championships for baseball in 2011.

== Other distinctions ==
As of December 2010, eight Buchanan HS alumni have died in the wars in Iraq and Afghanistan, more than from any other California high school.

Since 2009, it has been the host for the CIF State Track and Field Championships.

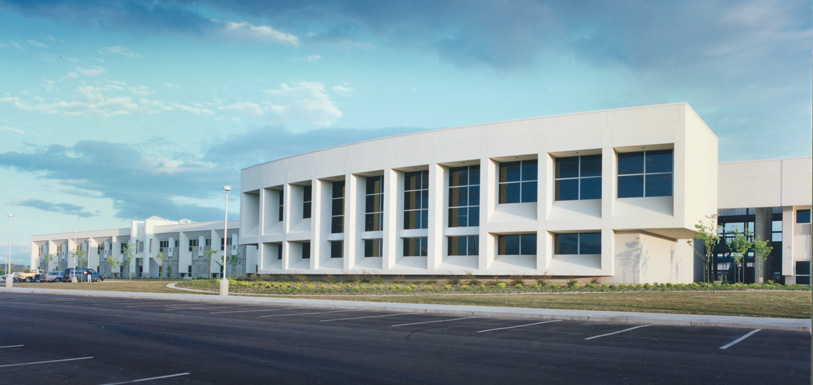
Buchanan Library

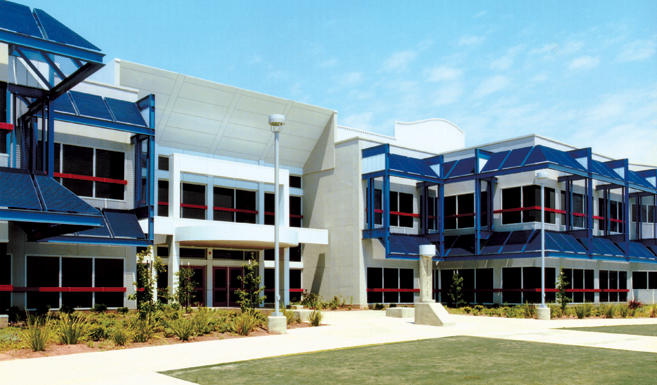
Campus

== Student body ==
Student body composition as of Fall 2017
Race and ethnicity	Total
White	47%
Hispanic	31%
Asian	13%
Multiracial	3%
Black	2%

== Notable alumni ==
- Kyle Alcorn, 2012 Olympian in the steeplechase
- Kevin Chappell, 2008 NCAA individual and team golf champion (UCLA), Jack Nicklaus Award winner, 2010 Fresh Express Classic at TPC Stonebrae Winner (Nationwide Tour), professional golfer
- Jason Donald, member of 2008 USA Baseball Team at 2008 Beijing Olympics, professional baseball player for Cleveland Indians
- Jordan Feliz, Christian musician
- Matt Giordano, professional football player for Oakland Raiders and Super Bowl XLI champion Indianapolis Colts
- Ryan Kenny, professional soccer player
- Jordan Luplow, MLB outfielder, Pittsburgh Pirates, Cleveland Indians, Tampa Bay Rays, Arizona Diamondbacks
- Jayden Mandal (2023), college football quarterback for the Fresno State Bulldogs
- Tony Mansolino (2000), manager for the Baltimore Orioles
- Rick Merlo, member of 2008 USA Water Polo Team at 2008 Beijing Olympics
- Kendall Milton, college football running back, Georgia Bulldogs
- D. J. Mitchell, professional basketball player
- Garrett Olson, MLB pitcher, Baltimore Orioles, Seattle Mariners, Pittsburgh Pirates
- Nathan Smith, professional soccer player, LA Galaxy
- Justin Wilson, Major League Baseball pitcher, Pittsburgh Pirates, Detroit Tigers, Chicago Cubs
- Jessica Wittner, Astronaut and Lieutenant Commander in the United States Navy
