= Michael Tanke =

American soccer player (born 1989)

Personal information
- Full name: Michael Tanke
- Date of birth: August 18, 1989 (age 37)
- Place of birth: Merrillville, Indiana, United States
- Height: 5 ft 8 in (1.73 m)
- Position: Midfielder

Youth career
- 2007–2010: Rhode Island Rams

Senior career*
| Years | Team | Apps | (Gls) |
| 2007 | Indiana Invaders | 4 | (1) |
| 2009 | Indiana Invaders | 11 | (0) |
| 2011–2013 | Rochester Rhinos | 36 | (0) |

Managerial career
- 2022–present: Canisius
- * Club domestic league appearances and goals as of April 28, 2014

Michael Tanke (born August 18, 1989, in Merrillville, Indiana) is an American former soccer player and current coach.

== Career ==
=== College and amateur ===
Tanke attended Niles High School, in Niles, Michigan, where he was named to the All-State First Team in 2006 and was a four-time All-Conference, three-time All-District and two-time All-Region honoree, played in the Region II Olympic Development Program, and played club soccer for the Indy Burn Eagles, before going on to play four years of college soccer for the Rams at the University of Rhode Island. He earned All-Tournament honors at the ODU Stihl Soccer Classic as a senior in 2010, and finished his college soccer career with 3 assists in 65 games.

During his college years Tanke also played for the Indiana Invaders in the USL Premier Development League., and trained with the Columbus Crew U-19 and U-20 and first teams.

=== Professional ===
Undrafted out of college, Tanke signed his first professional contract in March 2011 when he signed with USL Professional Division club Rochester Rhinos. He made his professional debut on April 15, 2011, in Rochester's season opening game against the Richmond Kickers. The club re-signed Tanke for 2012 on October 25, 2011. On July 7, 2015, Tanke scored in a Notre Dame staff game by dribbling across the middle of the field and riding a tackle from and old and obviously out of shape Greg Dalby. He then put the ball in the back of the net from 4 yards to score his first goal in his post high school career.

=== Coaching ===
After playing professionally, Tanke began his coaching career as a graduate assistant at Castleton State College (now Castleton University), in Castleton, Vermont. Tanke joined the coaching staff of the University of Dayton Flyers men's soccer team for the fall 2015 season. After two seasons with the Flyers, Tanke was hired as an assistant coach for the University at Buffalo Bulls men's soccer team for 2017 season. However, before the season began, the Bulls' men's soccer team, alongside multiple other UB athletic programs, was cut, the team being eliminated and no longer being fielded by the university. In 2018, Tanke was hired as an assistant coach on the staff of the Niagara University Purple Eagles men's soccer team. In 2022, Canisius College hired Tanke in his first head coaching role. He is the 15th coach in the history of the men's soccer program at Canisius.
