= Lancaster Inferno (NPSL) =

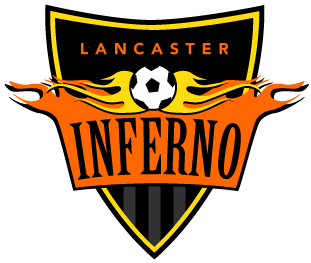
- Full name: Lancaster Inferno
- Nickname: Inferno
- Founded: 2008
- Dissolved: 2009
- Ground: Hempfield High School
- Chairman: (United States) Doug Harris
- Manager: (United States) Steve Klein
- League: National Premier Soccer League
- 2008: 4th, Mid-Atlantic Division
| Home colors | Away colors |

Lancaster Inferno (NPSL) was an American men's soccer team based in Lancaster, Pennsylvania, United States. Founded in 2008, the team played in the National Premier Soccer League (NPSL), a national amateur league at the fourth tier of the American Soccer Pyramid for just one season, until 2008, when the franchise folded and the team left the league.

The team played its home games in the athletic stadium at Hempfield High School in nearby Landisville, Pennsylvania. The team's colors were orange, black, and white.

The team was part of the larger Pennsylvania Classics organization, which hosts 36 teams from the under 9 group for boys and girls, to the under 19 for young men and women and represents the South Central Pennsylvania and greater Philadelphia areas. There is also a women's team named Lancaster Inferno which plays in the Women's Premier Soccer League (WPSL).

== Players ==
=== 2008 roster ===
Note: Flags indicate national team as defined under FIFA eligibility rules; some limited exceptions apply. Players may hold more than one non-FIFA nationality.

| No. | Pos. | Nation | Player |
|---|---|---|---|
| — | DF | BAH | Mackenson Altidor |
| — | FW | USA | Anthony Bafile |
| — | MF | USA | Drew Cost |
| — | GK | USA | David Flynn |
| — | FW | USA | Treavor Gelsinger |
| — | DF | USA | Jevon Gondwe |
| — | MF | USA | Trey Good |
| — | FW | USA | Dan Hagey |
| — | MF | USA | Jared Harris |
| — | FW | USA | Max Kinderwater |

| No. | Pos. | Nation | Player |
|---|---|---|---|
| — | DF | USA | Glenn Leitch |
| — | DF | USA | Ross Liberati |
| — | GK | USA | Paul McHenry |
| — | DF | USA | Josh Mull |
| — | FW | USA | Kemal Nuspahic |
| — | MF | USA | Nick Pozzessere |
| — | DF | USA | Rocco Pozzessere |
| — | DF | USA | Derek Sipe |
| — | MF | USA | Matt Smallwood |

== Year-by-year ==
| Year | Division | League | Regular season | Playoffs | Open Cup |
|---|---|---|---|---|---|
| 2008 | 4 | NPSL | 4th, Mid-Atlantic | Did not qualify | Did not qualify |

== Head coaches ==
- (United States) Steve Klein (2008)

== Stadium ==
- Hempfield High School; Landisville, Pennsylvania (2008)
