= Mackenson Altidor =

Bahamian footballer (born 1984)

Personal information
- Date of birth: 20 June 1984 (age 42)
- Place of birth: Marsh Harbour, Bahamas
- Height: 1.83 m (6 ft 0 in)
- Position: Centre-back

Youth career
- 2005–2006: Northern Oklahoma College
- 2007: Temple University

Senior career*
Years	Team	Apps	(Gls)
2008	Ocean City Barons	3	(0)
2008	Lancaster Inferno		
2009–2015	Bears FC		

International career
2004–2011	Bahamas	6	(0)
- * Club domestic league appearances and goals

Mackenson "Mack" Altidor (born 20 June 1984) is a Bahamian former footballer who played as a centre-back. He made six appearances for the Bahamas national team. After playing in domestic leagues, he played college soccer at Northern Oklahoma College before transferring to Temple University in Philadelphia. After graduating, he played club football in the United States for the Ocean City Barons and the Lancaster Inferno before returning the Bahamas where he played for a local team. Altidor also represented his country at the junior and senior level playing in Olympic and World Cup qualifiers.

== Early life and education ==
Altidor was born in Marsh Harbour, Abaco. He attended Abaco Central High School where he was captain of the basketball team. He only started playing football in 2002 when he was 18.

In 2005, he was one of six Bahamian footballers to receive scholarships to play college soccer in the United States, when he secured a scholarship to play at Northern Oklahoma College.

Altidor played college soccer for Northern Oklahoma College, where he earned an associate degree in Business Administration before he secured a scholarship in 2006 to play at Temple University in Philadelphia.

In December 2009, Altidor obtained a bachelor's degree in marketing from Temple and secured a position with a marketing firm in New Jersey.

== Career ==
Altifor played before 2005 with the Abacom United Football Club where he was named league MVP and helped his team win the Bahamas national championships. Altidor moved to the capital, where he played for the national team for three years before he was recruited by a college.

He played college soccer for Northern Oklahoma College from 2005 to 2007 where he helped to lead the team to the national championships.

Altidor was courted by numerous teams, choosing Temple. He transferred to Temple University in 2007 where he impressed early helping them to win the Drexel Invitational Tournament in September 2007, where he was named defensive MVP. The same week, he was named the Atlantic 10 Conference co-player of the week. Later in the season, he was an Honourable Mention on the All Conference Team, and was named the only defender on the Philadelphia All-Star Team.

Altifor represented his country at junior and senior level, including serving as team captain. He played in Olympic qualifiers in 2003 and World Cup qualifiers in 2006.

During the summer of 2007, he trained in New York City and in France, where he was offered a professional contract, which he turned down. In December 2007, he trained in Nassau with the national team for a World Cup qualifier against the British Virgin Islands. In 2008, he helped Temple to the semi-finals of the A-10 Conference Semi-finals. During his senior year at Temple, Altidor was shot off campus in a spate of incidents affecting students near campus.

After college, Altidor played senior football for the Ocean City Barons and the Lancaster Inferno. From 2009 to 2015, he played in Nassau with the Bears FC. Altidor now works as a real estate agent.

== Other Bibliography ==
- Bowleg, Earyel. 2020. "Shoppers flock to stores as shutdown bites" The Tribune (Nassau, Bahamas). 7 April 2020.
- Scavella, Nico. 2019. "Boy feared lost rescued as he sat in tree waiting" The Tribune (Nassau, Bahamas). 4 September 2019.
- Reardon, Jennifer. 2008. "Overseas soccer talent flocks to Ambler: The men’s soccer team boasts five players from international countries, headlined by senior defender Mackenson Altidor" The Temple News (Philadelphia). 16 September 2008.
- Santillo, Mirella. 2008. Soccer News. The Abaconian. 1 March 2008.
- McNeil, Terrance. 2007. Temple Athletics 101: An ABC guide to the Owls.The Temple News (Philadelphia). 21 August 2007.
- Walter, Kenny. 2007. Roughed up at St. Joe’s. The Temple News (Philadelphia). 16 October 2007.
- Johnson, Kelsie. 2006. "Feeder System Pays Off for Football Association". The Tribune (Nassau, Bahamas). 4 October 2006. p. 6B.
