= Drew Cost =

American soccer player

Personal information
- Full name: Andrew David Cost
- Date of birth: January 31, 1989 (age 37)
- Place of birth: West Chester, Pennsylvania, United States
- Height: 6 ft 0 in (1.83 m)
- Position: Midfielder

Youth career
- 2007–2010: Penn State Nittany Lions

Senior career*
| Years | Team | Apps | (Gls) |
| 2008 | Lancaster Inferno | | |
| 2011 | Rochester Rhinos | 19 | (3) |
- * Club domestic league appearances and goals as of September 5, 2011

Andrew David Cost (born January 31, 1989, in West Chester, Pennsylvania) is an American soccer player.

== Career ==
=== College and amateur ===
Cost attended Henderson High School, played in the Pennsylvania Olympic Development Program, and played club soccer for the Pennsylvania Classics, before going on to play four years of college soccer at the Pennsylvania State University. At Penn State he was named to the All-Big Ten Freshman Team in 2007, was a two-time All-Big Ten Second Team selection in both 2009 and 2010, and in his senior was a CoSIDA/ESPN Second Team Academic All-District selection and was named to the Wolstein Classic All-Tournament Team.

During his college years Cost also played for the Lancaster Inferno in their single season in the National Premier Soccer League in 2008.

=== Professional ===
Cost was selected with the 32nd pick of the 2011 MLS Supplemental Draft by Real Salt Lake, but was not offered a contract by the team and was released during pre-season.

Cost turned professional when he signed with USL Professional Division club Rochester Rhinos. He made his professional debut on April 23, 2011, in a 3–2 win over the Dayton Dutch Lions. Rochester re-signed Cost for 2012 on October 25, 2011.
