= Jesse Myers =

American soccer player and coach

Personal information
- Place of birth: United States

Youth career
- Years: Team
- 1984–1986: Limestone College

Managerial career
- 1987: Limestone College (assistant)
- 1988: Spartanburg Methodist College
- 1989–1992: University of North Carolina at Charlotte (assistant)
- 1993–1996: Philadelphia Textile University
- 1997–2011: Richmond Kickers (assistant)
- 2005–2010: Richmond Kickers Destiny
- 2012–2013: Rochester Rhinos
- 2014–: Revolution Empire U13/14

Jesse Myers is an American soccer coach. He was the head coach of the Rochester Rhinos in the USL Pro until his dismissal following a 1-6-1 start to the 2013 season. He was the assistant coach of the Richmond Kickers for 14 years.
