= Tyler Bellamy =

American soccer player (born 1988)

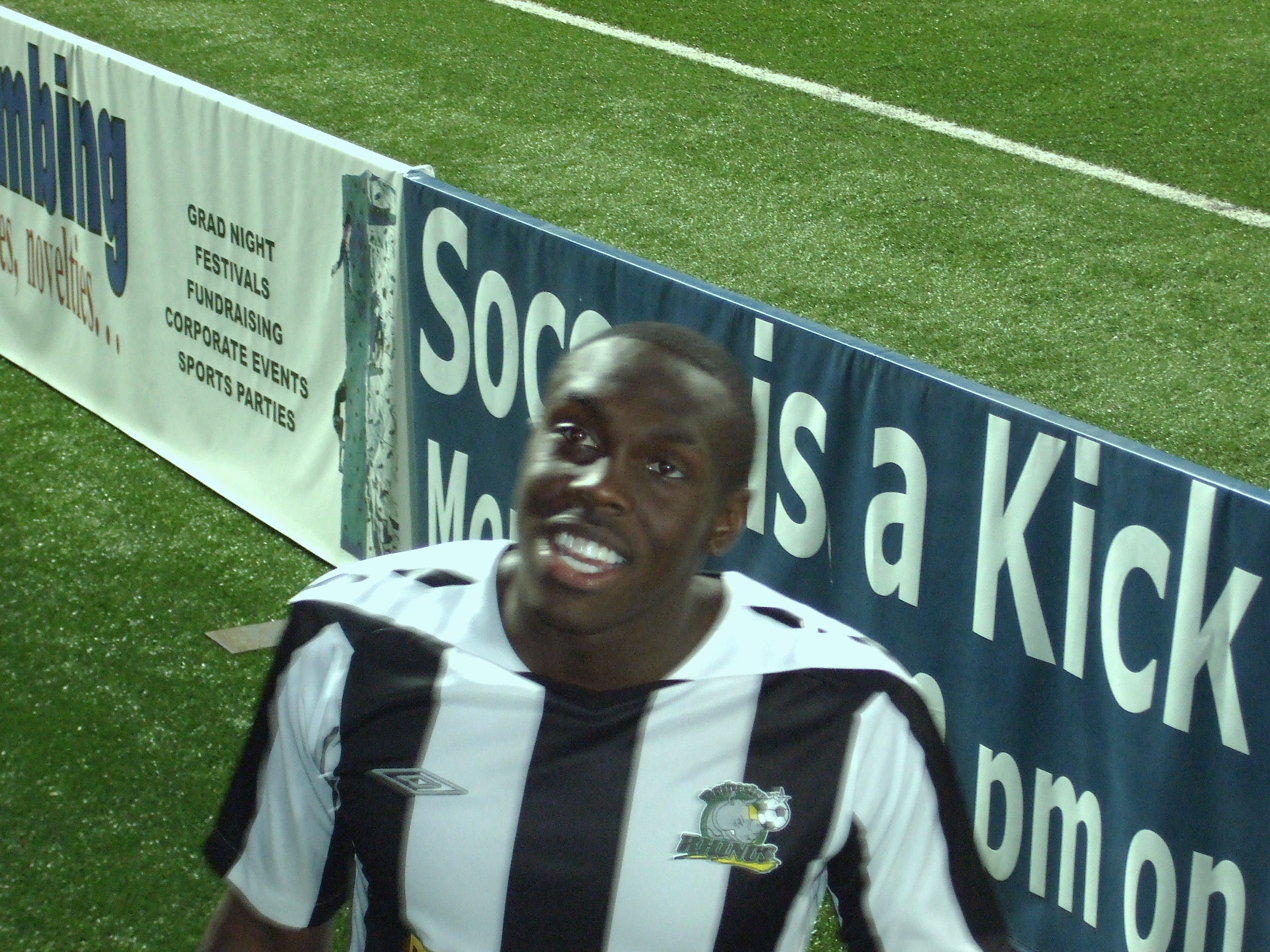

Personal information
- Full name: Tyler Jamaal Bellamy
- Date of birth: May 17, 1988 (age 38)
- Place of birth: Hammonton, New Jersey, United States
- Height: 6 ft 2 in (1.88 m)
- Position: Defender

Youth career
- 2006–2009: St. Bonaventure Bonnies

Senior career*
Years	Team	Apps	(Gls)
2008–2009	Ocean City Barons	18	(0)
2010–2013	Rochester Rhinos	73	(0)
- * Club domestic league appearances and goals as of April 28, 2014

Tyler Bellamy (born March 17, 1988) is an American former soccer player.

== Career ==
=== College and amateur ===
Bellamy attended St. Joseph High School, played club soccer for PSC Coppa, and played college soccer at the St. Bonaventure University, where he developed into one of the premier fullbacks in the Atlantic 10 Conference. He was selected to the University of Buffalo Fall Classic All-Tournament team as a sophomore in 2007. His junior season was cut short due to a foot injury. In 2009, Bellamy was named to the Atlantic 10 All-conference second team as well as the NSCAA Mid-Atlantic region first team. December 2009 – Named 1st Team All-Region, which placed him in the pool for All-American selection. Team Defensive player of the year.

During his college years Bellamy also played with the Ocean City Barons in the USL Premier Development League from 2008 to 2009. He played in 18 games for Ocean City, including helping the team reach the third round of the 2009 Lamar Hunt U.S. Open Cup where they lost a close game to D.C. United of Major League Soccer, 2–0. To get to that point, they upset two professional teams, Crystal Palace Baltimore and Real Maryland Monarchs, from the USL Second Division.

=== Professional ===
Undrafted out of college, Bellamy signed with Rochester Rhinos in February 2010. He made his professional debut on April 10, 2010, in Rochester's season opening game against Miami FC. Rochester re-signed Bellamy for 2012 on October 25, 2011. Bellamy played his last season with the Rochester Rhinos in 2013 and has not signed with another pro club.

== Honors ==
=== Rochester Rhinos ===
- USSF Division 2 Pro League Regular Season Champions (1): 2010
