= Tyler Rosenlund =

Canadian soccer player (born 1986)

Personal information
- Full name: Tyler Robert Rosenlund
- Date of birth: September 13, 1986 (age 40)
- Place of birth: Vancouver, British Columbia, Canada
- Height: 6 ft 1 in (1.85 m)
- Position: Midfielder

Team information
- Current team: Whitecaps FC 2

Youth career
- Riverside Secondary School

College career
Years	Team	Apps	(Gls)
2004–2006	UC Santa Barbara Gauchos		

Senior career*
Years	Team	Apps	(Gls)
2007	IFK Mariehamn	0	(0)
2007	Åtvidabergs FF	2	(0)
2008–2009	Toronto FC	8	(1)
2009	Surrey United	20	(5)
2010–2014	Rochester Rhinos	121	(10)
2015	Surrey United Firefighters		
2015–2016	Whitecaps FC 2	27	(2)

International career^{‡}
2002–2003	Canada U17	15	(1)
2004–2005	Canada U20	16	(2)
2008	Canada U23	4	(1)
2008	Canada	1	(0)
- * Club domestic league appearances and goals as of September 25, 2015 ‡ National team caps and goals as of 20:46, February 27, 2015 (UTC)

Tyler Robert Rosenlund (born September 13, 1986) is a Canadian soccer player currently playing for Whitecaps FC 2 in the USL.

== Early life and education ==
Rosenlund played college soccer at the University of California, Santa Barbara. He was a member of the UCSB Gauchos squad that reached the 2004 NCAA Division I Men's Soccer Championship which lost to Indiana Hoosiers on penalties. He eventually won a National Championship with the Gauchos by beating the UCLA Bruins in the 2006 NCAA Division I Men's Soccer Championship.

== Career ==
=== Scandinavia ===
After the 2006 NCAA season ended, Rosenlund left UC Santa Barbara early. He trialed with Allmänna Idrottsklubben of the Swedish Premier Division Allsvenskan and later moved on to another trial with IFK Mariehamn in the Finnish Premier Division, Veikkausliiga. He failed to secure a contract with either club but made one appearance for IFK Mariehamn in the Finnish League Cup.

After his short spell in Finland he headed back to Sweden and secured a contract with Åtvidabergs FF in the Swedish second tier, Superettan. He made a couple of appearances for ÅFF before he was released by the club.

=== Canada ===
On March 21, 2008, Toronto FC announced Tyler Rosenlund was signed to a senior developmental contract. He made his Toronto FC debut on April 5, 2008, appearing as an 83rd-minute substitute during a 4–1 defeat to D.C. United. He was the first Canadian-born player to score for Toronto FC, which happened at BMO Field against Chivas USA on September 6, 2008.

He was released by Toronto in February 2009 and signed later with Surrey United.

=== Rochester Rhinos ===
Rosenlund signed with USSF Division 2 Professional League club Rochester Rhinos in March 2010. He was a mainstay of the club in 2010 and 2011, being named team most valuable player in the latter year. Rochester re-signed Rosenlund for the 2012 season on November 21, 2011.

=== Whitecaps FC 2 ===
Rosenlund played briefly for Surrey United Firefighters in the Vancouver Metro Soccer League following his departure from Rochester. The stay was short-lived as it was announced on February 26, 2015, that Rosenlund had joined Whitecaps FC 2.

=== International ===
Rosenlund made his first international appearance with the Canadian men's national team on January 30, 2008. Rosenlund entered Canada's friendly against Martinique in the 72nd minute in a 1-0 Friendly win. He has also featured extensively for the U-17 and U-20 Canadian teams and was active for Canada's U-23 team for Olympic Qualifying.

== Awards and honors ==
=== Rochester Rhinos ===
- USSF Division 2 Pro League Regular Season Champions (1): 2010

=== UC Santa Barbara ===
- NCAA Men's Division I Soccer Championship (1): 2006

=== Individual ===
- 2009: Toronto FC Vs. Chivas USA - Man of the Match
- 2006: NCAA Division 1 College Cup Final Four All-Star Team
- 2005: Named to the Missouri Athletic Club Hermann Trophy Watch List
- 2004: Freshman All-American
- 2003: B.C. Soccer Athlete Of The Year
