= Rochester Community Sports Complex Stadium =

Multi-purpose stadium

Coordinates: 43°9′44.0″N 77°37′45.7″W

Rochester Community Sports Complex
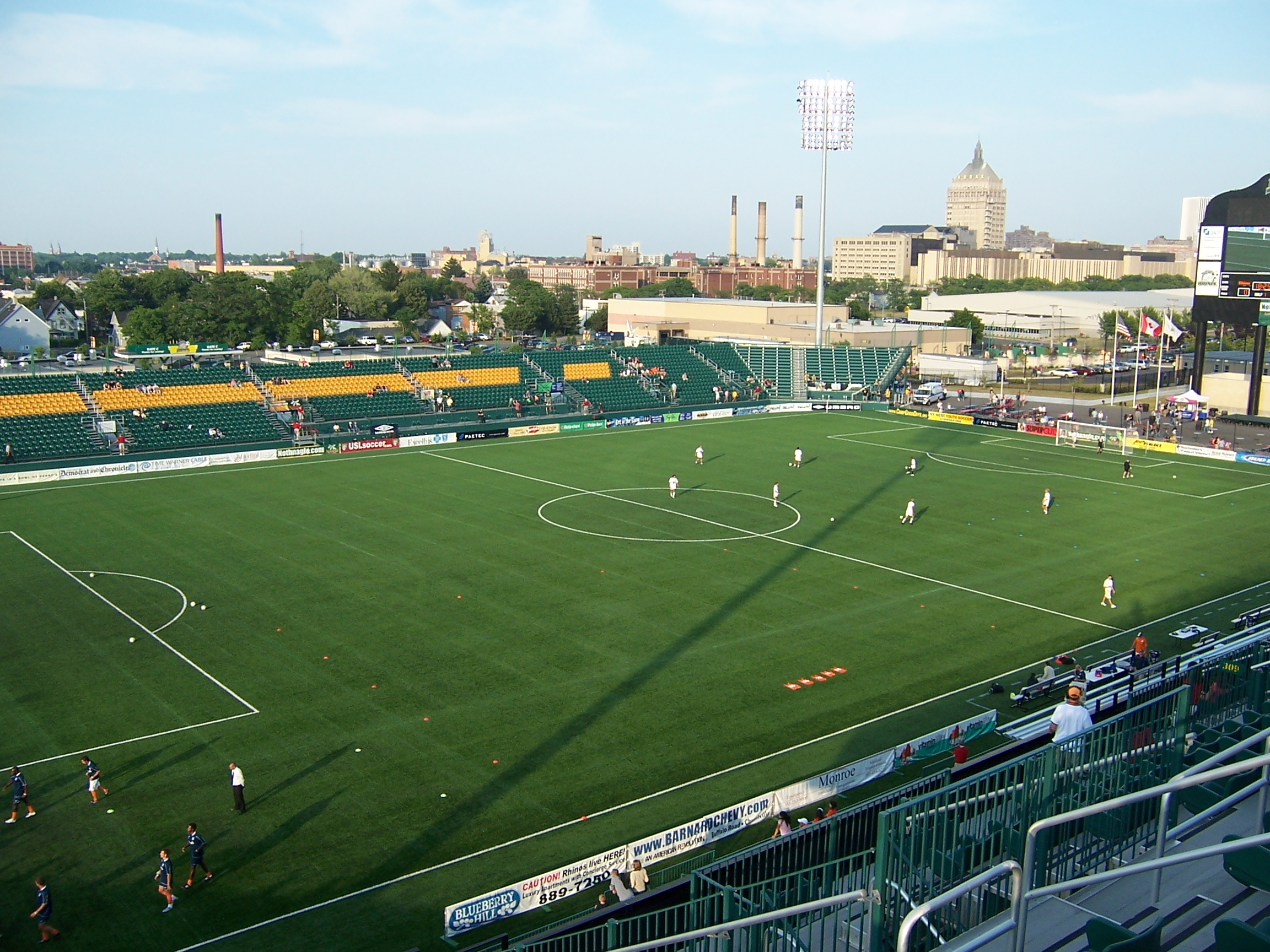
- Interactive map of Rochester Community Sports Complex
- Former names: PAETEC Park (2006–2008); Marina Auto Stadium (2009–2010); Sahlen's Stadium (2011–2015); Rochester Rhinos Stadium (2015–2016); Capelli Sport Stadium (2017); Marina Auto Stadium (2018)
- Location: Rochester, New York
- Owner: City of Rochester
- Operator: Rochester Soccer Corp.
- Capacity: 13,768
- Surface: FieldTurf
- Record attendance: 15,404 (July 20, 2011)

Construction
- Groundbreaking: July 9, 2004
- Opened: June 3, 2006; 20 years ago
- Cost: $35 million
- Architect: HOK Sport

Tenants
- Rochester Rhinos (USL) (2006–2017); Rochester Rattlers (MLL) (2006–2008, 2011–2014, 2017); Rochester Rhinos Women (WL) (2006–2008); Rochester Ravens FC (WL) (2009–2010); Rochester Raiders (IFL) (2010, 1 game); Western New York Flash (NWSL) (2011–2016); Rochester Dragons (AUDL) (2014, 1 game); Toronto FC II (USL) (2018, 4 games); Rochester Lancers (NPSL) (2018); Rochester Lady Lancers (UWS) (2018); Flower City Union (NPSL) (2022–present)

Rochester Community Sports Complex Stadium, also called the "downtown soccer stadium", is a soccer-specific stadium in Rochester, New York within the Rochester Community Sports Complex. It is home to the Flower City Union of the National Premier Soccer League. Previously the stadium was home in 2018 to the Rochester Lancers and Lady Lancers of the NPSL and UWS, respectively. The stadium originally hosted the Rochester Rhinos of the USL, the Rochester Rattlers of MLL, and the Western New York Flash of the NWSL.

The stadium hosts other sporting events such as collegiate soccer, Rochester Rhinos Elite youth soccer games and practices, American football, field hockey and drum and bugle corps competitions as well as concerts, as well as occasionally hosting the New York State Public High School Athletic Association (NYSPHSAA) Section V football championship and Far West Regional championship (played between Sections V and VI). It is owned by the City of Rochester and is operated as a youth sports complex.

== History ==
The stadium was designed by HOK Sport (now Populous). It was constructed on a filled-in section of the Erie Canal's original routing through Rochester. This was also once the route of the Rochester Subway, which was built in the old canal bed and ended operations in 1956. The facility was funded jointly by the state of New York, the city of Rochester, and the Rhinos (the State of New York paying $23 million while the Rhinos and the city paid the remaining amount) with a total cost of some 30 million. Infrastructure improvements will be paid for by the city of Rochester.

The park hit some minor stumbling blocks even before the first shovel hit dirt: the original designs needed to be revised when it was revealed that the playing field was below the water table, and the environmental impact report revealed that the site had pockets of petroleum that needed to be treated. The groundbreaking took place on July 9, 2004, and the first phase of the construction was completed. The stadium had its grand opening (as PAETEC Park) on June 3, 2006, which featured the Rhinos' first home game of the season. The game was played in front of a capacity crowd of 13,768 fans and ended in a 2–2 draw against the Virginia Beach Mariners.

On August 22, 2018, it was announced that the Rhinos, then on a 1-year hiatus from the United Soccer League, would be leaving Marina Auto Stadium to pursue building a new stadium in the suburbs of Rochester.

In 2021, the city of Rochester added new facilities on the property that includes the stadium, by adding an indoor training facility to the Rochester Community Sports Complex.

=== Naming rights ===
Naming rights to the park were purchased by PAETEC Communications, a local telecommunications company, in 2004 for a reported total of $23 million over 12 years. When the club changed ownership, the agreement was voided at the end of the 2008 season.

The stadium then became known as Rochester Rhinos Stadium. In mid-2009, the team had a raffle to determine the naming rights for the stadium. For each $1,000 an individual, group, company, or other entity paid to the Rhinos, they were given one chance to win the right to name the stadium. On May 30, 2009, the night of the Rhinos' 2009 home opener, Marina Auto Group, a Webster-based automobile dealership group, won the raffle. The Marina Auto name was retained through 2010 under a traditional naming rights agreement.

On February 10, 2011, it was announced that the new name of the stadium would be Sahlen's Stadium after the deal with Marina Auto expired. This was part of a five-year naming rights agreement with Sahlen's Packing Company, Inc. of Buffalo, New York, with an option to renew the agreement for another five years. The cost of the agreement was not released, but was estimated at $2 million. In October 2015, the stadium operators announced that they would not exercise the option to continue the existing naming agreement with Sahlen's, but would instead seek a new agreement. In the interim, the stadium reverted to being known as Rochester Rhinos Stadium. On January 24, 2017, Capelli Sport entered a corporate partnership with the Rhinos and the stadium was renamed Capelli Sport Stadium.

Marina Auto Group entered into a new naming rights deal in 2018, reverting the name of the stadium back to Marina Auto Stadium. Without a regular tenant from 2019 the facility became known as "the downtown soccer stadium" as part of the City of Rochester's Community Sports Complex.

== Events ==
The Rochester Rhinos and Rochester Rhinos Women soccer teams of the USL First Division and USL W-League, respectively, and the Rochester Rattlers of Major League Lacrosse moved to the facility in 2006. The Rattlers were dissolved following the 2008 MLL season but returned for the 2011 MLL season. The Rochester Rhinos Women dissolved and were replaced by the Rochester Ravens in 2009; the Ravens were replaced by the Western New York Flash in 2011. The Flash then played matches in the stadium, including the 2013 NWSL championship match, until they were purchased in January 2017 and moved to Cary, North Carolina.

PAETEC Park hosted Major League Lacrosse championship weekend in 2007.

On June 5, 2010, the stadium was the site of the first outdoor game in Indoor Football League history as the Rochester Raiders faced off against the Chicago Slaughter.

The Drum Corps Associates drum corps championships were held at the stadium each Labor Day weekend from 2006–2011. The championships returned to Rochester from 2014–2017 and also for the 2022 and 2023 seasons.

=== International friendlies ===
- On September 13, 2006, the United States women's national soccer team (USWNT) played an international friendly against Mexico, winning 3–1 in front of 6,784.
- On July 19, 2009, the USWNT played an international friendly against Canada in front of 8,433, winning 1–0 on a goal scored by Rochester native Abby Wambach.
- On September 1, 2012, the USWNT played international friendly against Costa Rica in front of 13,208 fans as part of their 2012 Olympic championship celebration, winning 8–0.
- On September 18, 2014, the USWNT played an international friendly against Mexico in front of 5,680 fans, winning 4–0.
- In July 2006, the Rochester Rhinos hosted Sheffield Wednesday for an international friendly in front of 6,289 fans, losing 0–2.

Prior to the stadium's construction, the team also played matches at Frontier Field and at Eunice Kennedy Shriver Stadium in Brockport.

Events and tenants
Preceded by Frontier Field	Home of the Rochester Rhinos; 2006–2017	Succeeded by TBD
Preceded by Bishop Kearney Field; Toyota Park (as Chicago Machine)	Home of the Rochester Rattlers; 2006 – 2008; 2011 – 2014	Succeeded by BMO Field (as Toronto Nationals); Eunice Kennedy Shriver Stadium
Preceded by Home Depot Center Track Field	Host of Major League Lacrosse championship weekend 2007	Succeeded by Harvard Stadium
