= Isaac Kissi =

Ghanaian footballer (born 1987)

Personal information
- Full name: Isaac Kissi
- Date of birth: May 14, 1987 (age 39)
- Place of birth: Brong-Ahafo, Ghana
- Height: 6 ft 2 in (1.88 m)
- Position: Forward

Youth career
- 2007–2009: Dayton Flyers

Senior career*
Years	Team	Apps	(Gls)
2010–2012	Rochester Rhinos	46	(12)
2016	Rochester River Dogz FC	5	(1)
2017	Rochester Lancers	5	(1)
2020–present	Roc City Boom	4	(2)
- * Club domestic league appearances and goals as of August 11, 2013

Isaac Kissi (born May 14, 1987, in Brong-Ahafo) is a Ghanaian footballer.

== Career ==
=== College and amateur ===
Kiss attended the Presbyterian Boys Secondary School in his native Ghana, and studied for two years at the University of Ghana, before accepting a soccer scholarship with the University of Dayton in the United States in 2007. He subsequently played three years of college soccer with the Flyers; he was selected to the Atlantic 10 All-Championship Team and the UNCW Courtyard by Marriott All-Tournament Team as a sophomore in 2008.

=== Professional ===
Kissi was drafted in the third round (42nd overall) of the 2010 MLS SuperDraft by Chivas USA but was not offered a contract by the team and was cut before the season started.

He subsequently signed with the Rochester Rhinos, and made his professional debut on May 19, 2010, in a game against Crystal Palace Baltimore. He scored his first two professional goals on June 12, 2010, in a 2–1 win, again over Crystal Palace Baltimore. Rochester re-signed Kissi for the 2012 season, which will be his third with the club, on October 25, 2011.

== Honors ==
Rochester Rhinos

- USSF Division 2 Pro League Regular Season Champions: 2010
