= Rochester Rhinos =

Defunct soccer club, based in Rochester, New York

- Club crest used from 2008 to 2015
- Founded: 1996 as Rochester Raging Rhinos
- Dissolved: March 2023
- Owner: David and Wendy Dworkin (2016–2023)
- League: A-League (1996); USL First Division (1997–2010); USL Pro (2011–2017); MLS Next Pro (2022)

The Rochester Rhinos, originally known as the Rochester Raging Rhinos, were an American soccer team based in Rochester, New York, United States. The club won the 1999 U.S. Open Cup, marking the only time a non-MLS team has won the U.S. Open Cup since MLS started play in 1996.

Founded in 1996 as the Rochester Raging Rhinos, they changed their name to Rochester Rhinos to start the 2008 season. The club began a four-year hiatus after the 2017 USL season in the second tier of the United States soccer league system. The team then rebranded as Rochester New York FC and played its first and only season in MLS Next Pro in 2022, but departed before the beginning of the 2023 season.

The club was affiliated with the youth club Empire United Soccer Academy, which rebranded as Rochester New York FC Youth and continues to operate as a separate club. The youth club currently has a team in the United Premier Soccer League.

== History ==
=== 1996–2017 ===
Rochester Raging Rhinos was founded in 1996 and played in the now-defunct original A-League until it merged with the USISL for the 1997 season, creating the new A-League. After reaching the championship game in 1996 they won their first league championship in 1998.

In 1999 the club made it to the final of the U.S. Open Cup, where they defeated MLS club Colorado Rapids 2–0, becoming the first team from outside MLS to win the national cup since MLS's inception. This win was followed by two further A-League titles in 2000 and 2001.

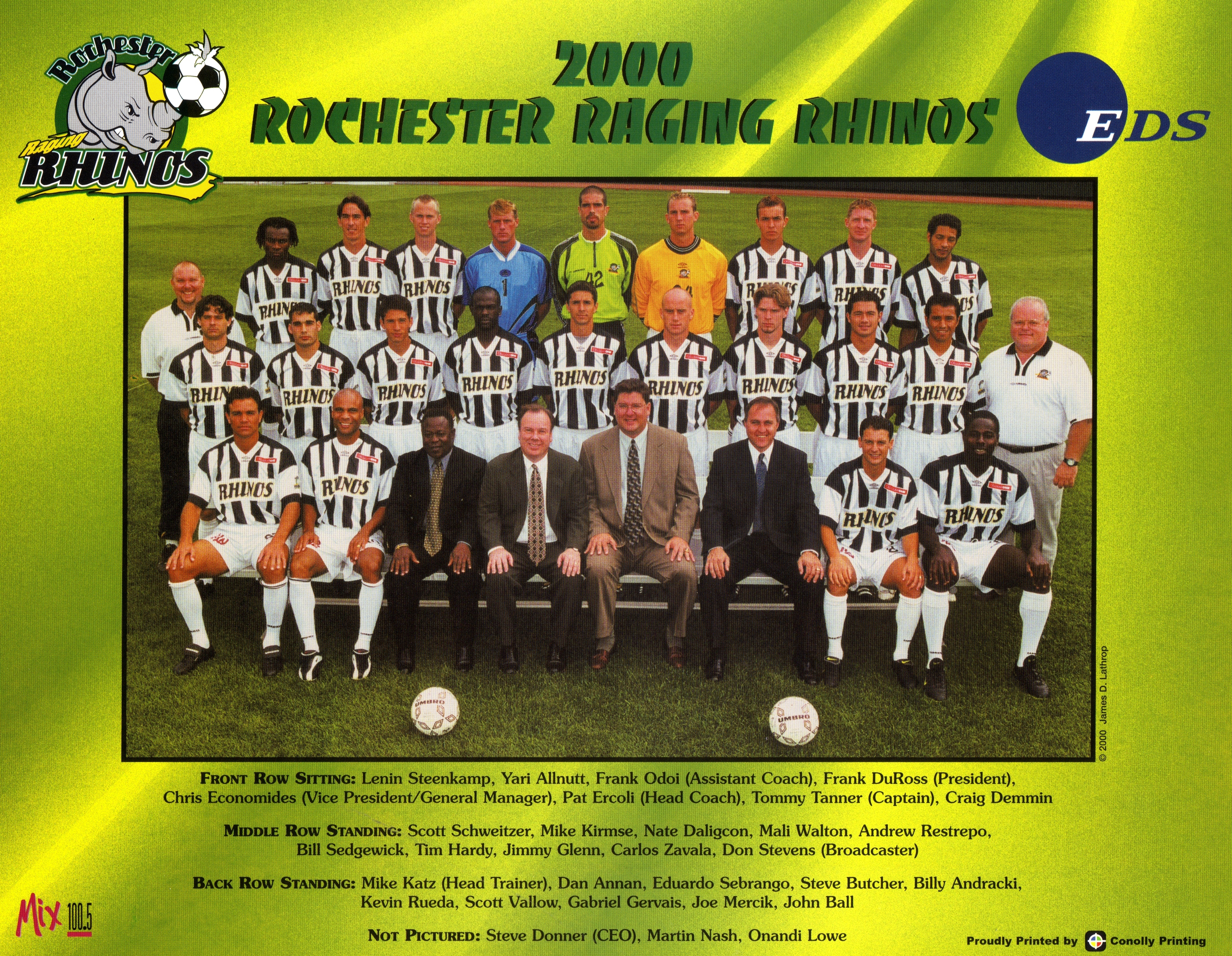
The 2000 Rochester Raging Rhinos team

A year after the A-League's renaming to the USL First Division in 2005, the Rhinos moved into the newly completed PAETEC Park, a 13,768-seat soccer-specific stadium now known as Rochester Community Sports Complex Stadium, and again made the championship game. The Rhinos were considered a candidate to be an MLS expansion team when PAETEC Park was in the planning stages.

The team was declared insolvent in 2008 after defaulting on their stadium agreement, and PAETEC Park was seized by the city of Rochester. After a brief search for a new owner and investor who could improve the team's financial outlook, in March 2008 the club was taken over by Utica businessman Rob Clark. Clark changed the team's name to the "Rochester Rhinos," and assured that the financial situation of the team was stable and it would be able to play the next year. After two seasons under Clark the club joined the new NASL for its 2010 season. The United States Soccer Federation refused the NASL's application for sanctioning, and instead operated its own temporary second-division league for 2010. The Rhinos were part of that temporary USSF Division 2 Professional League. The Rhinos switched leagues again before the 2011 season to the then third-division USL Pro league, who considered themselves equally competitive with the second-division NASL.

The 2011 season ended with the Rhinos first in their division followed by a playoff season that lasted two games. The Rhinos saw off the Pittsburgh Riverhounds 4–0 in first round of the playoffs and then lost 2–1 at home to the Harrisburg City Islanders to finish the season. At the end of the season, head coach Bob Lilley was replaced by Jesse Myers, most recently an assistant coach of the Richmond Kickers.

In January 2013, the Rhinos became the official USL Pro affiliate of the New England Revolution. On May 19, Following a 1–6–1 start to the 2013 season, Myers was dismissed and Pat Ercoli named head coach. They missed the playoffs for the first time ever, finishing with a 6–10–10 record.

The league revoked the Clark family's ownership of the club in January 2016, citing the revocation of the lease on Rochester Rhinos Stadium by the City of Rochester. The league took over operations of the club until it could be sold to a new ownership group. David and Wendy Dworkin, minority owners of the Sacramento Kings basketball team, were identified as the Rhinos' new owners later in the month. The Dworkins were officially announced as the new owners on March 10, 2016.

=== 2017–2023 ===
Crest of Rochester New York FC, the club's name during its final season.

On November 30, 2017, the Rhinos announced that they would go on hiatus to seek additional funding. After almost a year of silence the team announced that it planned to move to the new third division league USL League One and return to the field in 2020. Moreover, the team announced that it had reached a deal with the city to vacate Marina Auto Stadium and stated it would be searching a site to build a new stadium. Towards the end of the first USL League One season, the Rhinos' President Pat Ercoli announced on Uncle Sam's Soccer Podcast that due to delays and pacing of the development of the Rhinos' new stadium that the team would likely sit out the 2020 season and relaunch in 2021.

In June 2021, Jamie Vardy was announced as co-owner of the franchise and intended to field a team for the 2022 season. Lee Tucker, who was the project leader at Vardy's successful V9 Academy – which gave opportunities to non-League players in England seeking to break into the professional game, will be appointed Sporting Director. While it was originally announced that Jamie Vardy had "bought a minority stake" and given "significant investment", it was later confirmed that he was given his ownership stake as a publicity stunt.

On September 1, 2021, the club announced an extensive makeover as part of its rebirth; the Rhinos rebranded as Rochester New York FC, or RNYFC for short, and introduced a new logo. The new club badge features an abstract rendering of Rochester's High Falls waterfall.

The club returned to play in 2022 and was the only independent club in the new MLS Next Pro league. They made the playoffs but were eliminated in the quarterfinals. On March 10, 2023, Rochester New York FC withdrew from MLS Next Pro and ceased operations citing an "unsustainable business model".

== Stadiums ==
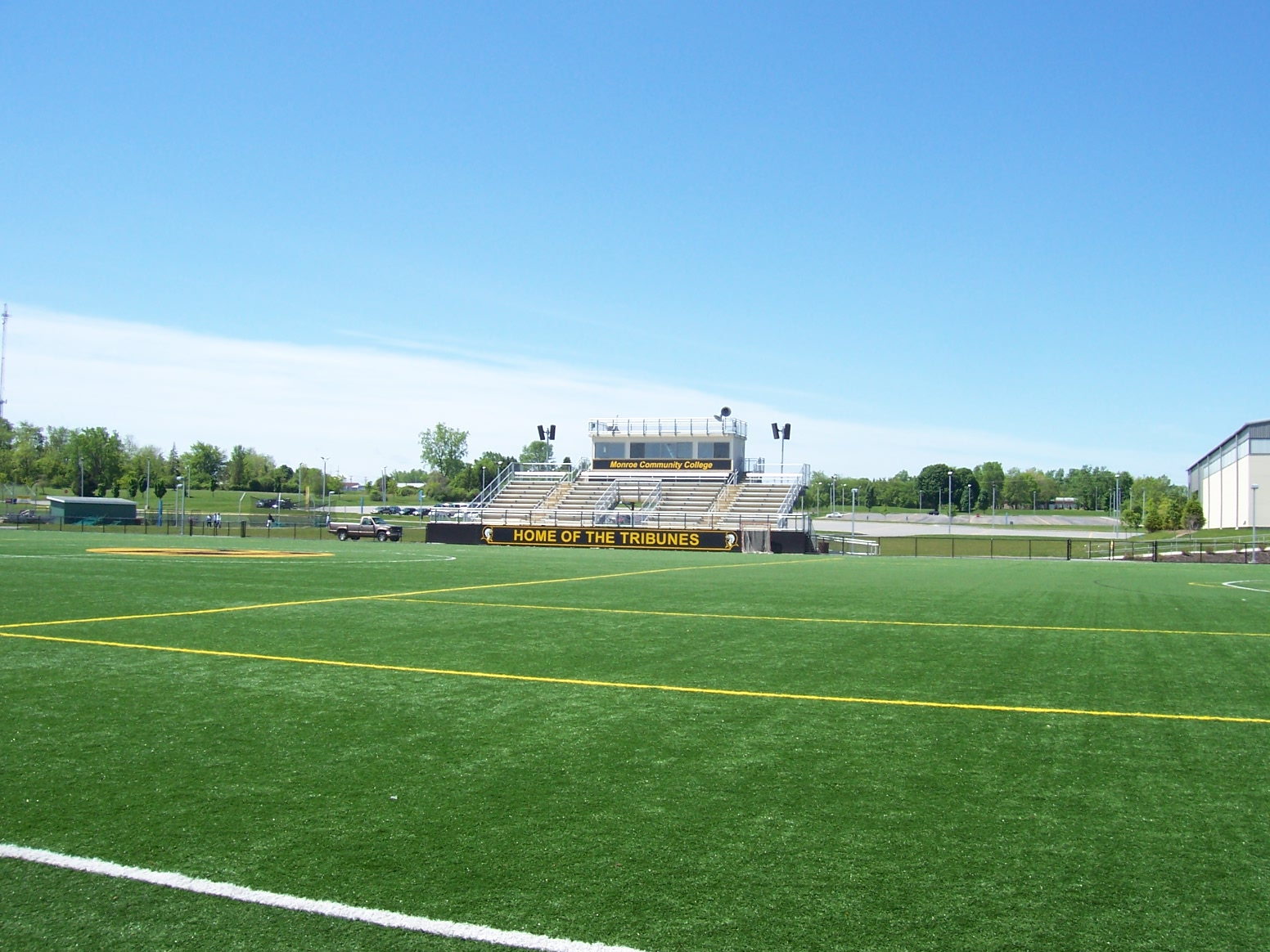
John L. DiMarco Field at Monroe Community College

- Fauver Stadium; Rochester, New York (1996)
- Frontier Field; Rochester, New York (1996–2005)
- Marina Auto Stadium; Rochester, New York (2006–2017)
- John L. DiMarco Field; Brighton, New York (2022)

The Raging Rhinos first began play in 1996 at Fauver Stadium, a soccer venue at the University of Rochester. They then played at Frontier Field, a Minor League Baseball park, from 1996 to 2005.

Starting in 2006, the team played in Marina Auto Stadium, a soccer-specific stadium built for their use. When the Rhinos went on hiatus at the end of 2017, they originally sought to remain at the stadium, scheduling neutral-site USL matches during the 2018 season to meet the terms of their lease. However, in August 2018 the team announced they would be seeking a new venue.

In June 2021, when the team announced a new co-owner ahead of a planned return to play in 2022, they indicated they would play at Empire United Soccer Complex in Henrietta, New York. However, Empire United's field had no stands, concessions, or other amenities, and would have required upgrades for professional soccer use. In order to be ready for a March 2022 kickoff in MLS Next Pro, the team announced in December 2021 that they would instead play at John L. DiMarco Field, a 1,500-capacity soccer and lacrosse venue at Monroe Community College in Brighton, New York.

== Club culture ==
=== Supporters ===
Rochester New York FC had two major supporters' groups. Founded in 2011, the Oak Street Brigade previously occupied section 101 at Capelli Sport Stadium, the former home of the Rochester Rhinos. The other major supporters' group was the North Star Ultras.

=== Notable former players ===
==== Rochester Rhinos Hall of Fame ====
- 2011: Lenin Steenkamp
- 2012: Craig Demmin, Doug Miller, Pat Onstad
- 2013: 1999 U.S. Open Cup Team
- 2014: Yari Allnutt, Scott Vallow
- 2015: Darren Tilley, Mali Walton

==== Retired numbers ====
- 14 – (Trinidad and Tobago) Mickey Trotman, MF, 2001 (posthumous honor) (Note: Died in a crash car in 2001.)
- 19 – (United States) Doug Miller, F, 1996–99, 2003–06

=== Head coaches ===
- (Canada) Pat Ercoli (1996–2004)
- (England) Laurie Calloway (2005–2007)
- (England) Darren Tilley (2008–2009)
- (United States) Bob Lilley (2010–2011)
- (United States) Jesse Myers (2012–2013)
- (Canada) Pat Ercoli (interim, 2013)
- (United States) Bob Lilley (2014–2017)
- (Portugal) Bruno Baltazar (2022)

== Honors ==
=== League ===
- USL Championship
  - Champions: 2015
  - Regular season winners: 2015
- USSF Division 2 Professional League
  - Regular season winners: 2010
  - USL Conference champions (1): 2010
- USL A-League
  - Winners (3): 1998, 2000, 2001
  - Northeast Division champions (3): 1998, 1999, 2002

=== Cups ===
- U.S. Open Cup
  - Winners (1): 1999
  - Runners-up (1): 1996

== Record ==
=== Year-by-year ===
Season	League											Position		Playoffs	USOC	Continental / Other	Average attendance	Top goalscorer(s)	
Season	Div	League	Pld	W	L	D	GF	GA	GD	Pts	PPG	Conf.	Overall	Playoffs	USOC	Continental / Other	Average attendance	Name	Goals
1996	2	A-League	27	14	13	0	44	42	+2	42	1.56	N/A	5th	RU	RU	Ineligible	9,991	(United States) Doug Miller	23
1997	2	A-League	28	14	14	0	56	47	+9	42	1.50	2nd	9th	R1	Ro16	Ineligible	10,677	(United States) Doug Miller	23
1998	2	A-League	28	24	4	0	72	15	+57	72	2.57	1st	1st	W	Ro16	Ineligible	11,499	(England) Darren Tilley	21
1999	2	A-League	28	22	6	0	47	20	+27	66	2.36	1st	1st	RU	W	Ineligible	11,551	(Canada) Mauro Biello	8
2000	2	A-League	28	17	9	2	42	25	+17	53	1.89	3rd	6th	W	Ro16	Ineligible	11,628	(United States) Yari Allnutt	10
2001	2	A-League	26	16	6	4	43	27	+16	52	2.00	2nd	3rd	W	R2	Ineligible	10,789	(South Africa) Lenin Steenkamp	9
2002	2	A-League	28	17	8	3	38	25	+13	54	1.93	2nd	4th	SF	Ro16	Ineligible	10,008	(South Africa) Lenin Steenkamp	8
2003	2	A-League	28	15	7	6	55	36	+19	51	1.82	3rd	7th	SF	Ro16	Ineligible	10,169	(United States) Doug Miller	17
2004	2	A-League	28	15	10	3	36	32	+4	48	1.71	4th	5th	QF	QF	Ineligible	10,200	(United States) Chris Carrieri	8
2005	2	USL-1	28	15	7	6	45	27	+18	51	1.82	N/A	2nd	SF	QF	Ineligible	9,791	(United States) Kirk Wilson	9
2006	2	USL-1	28	13	4	11	34	21	+13	50	1.79	N/A	2nd	RU	Ro16	Ineligible	10,110	(England) Matthew Delicâte	8
2007	2	USL-1	28	12	10	6	39	36	+3	42	1.50	N/A	5th	QF	Ro16	Ineligible	9,705	(Ivory Coast) Hamed Modibo Diallo	9
2008	2	USL-1	30	11	10	9	35	32	+3	41	1.37	N/A	4th	SF	Ro16	Ineligible	8,243	(Liberia) Johnny Menyongar	6
2009	2	USL-1	30	11	9	10	34	32	+2	43	1.43	N/A	6th	QF	SF	DNQ	6,888	(Liberia) Johnny Menyongar	11
2010	2	D2 Pro	30	16	8	6	38	24	+14	54	1.80	1st	1st	QF	Ro16	DNQ	6,464	(Ghana) Isaac Kissi	8
2011	3	USL Pro	24	12	8	4	31	23	+8	40	1.67	1st	4th	SF	Ro16	DNQ	5,339	(United States) Andrew Hoxie (Trinidad and Tobago) Kendall Jagdeosingh	5
2012	3	USL Pro	24	12	7	5	27	23	+4	41	1.71	N/A	2nd	SF	R3	DNQ	6,233	(United States) Andrew Hoxie	6
2013	3	USL Pro	26	6	10	10	25	39	–14	28	1.08	N/A	11th	DNQ	R3	DNQ	5,876	(Scotland) Tam McManus	7
2014	3	USL Pro	28	10	10	8	29	25	+4	38	1.46	N/A	6th	QF	Ro16	DNQ	5,329	(United States) J.C. Banks	9
2015	3	USL	28	17	1	10	40	15	+25	61	2.18	1st	1st	W	R4	DNQ	5,599	(Cape Verde) Steevan Dos Santos	9
2016	3	USL	30	13	5	12	38	25	+13	51	1.70	4th	6th	QF	R4	DNQ	3,655	(United States) Christian Volesky	10
2017	2	USL	32	14	7	11	36	28	+8	53	1.66	4th	9th	QF	R4	DNQ	2,031	(United States) Jochen Graf	11
2018	On Hiatus																		
2019	On Hiatus																		
2020	On Hiatus																		
2021	On Hiatus																		
2022	3	MLSNP	24	10	8	6	37	30	+7	40	1.67	4th	9th	QF	R4	DNQ	1,096	(United States) Gibran Rayo	13
Total	–	–	639	326	181	132	921	649	+272	1113	1.74	–	–	–	–	–	–	(United States) Doug Miller	75

1. Avg. attendance include statistics from league matches only.
2. Top goalscorer(s) includes all goals scored in league play, playoffs, U.S. Open Cup, and other competitive matches.
3. Points and PPG have been adjusted from non-traditional to traditional scoring systems for seasons prior to 2003 to more effectively compare historical team performance across seasons.
4. Pts in 2008 excludes one deducted point for fielding an ineligible player.
