= 2010 AC St. Louis season =

AC St. Louis
2010 season
- Chairman: Jeff Cooper
- Manager: Dale Schilly
- USSF Division 2: 5th, NASL Conference
- 2010 U.S. Open Cup: Round of 16
- Top goalscorer: League: Ambersley (9); All: Ambersley (11)
- Highest home attendance: 5,695
- Lowest home attendance: 2,037
- Average home league attendance: 2,767
Home colours	Away colours

The 2010 AC St. Louis season was the club's first and last season of professional soccer. The Saints in the NASL Conference of the USSF D2 Pro League, the second tier of the American Soccer Pyramid. The league was a temporary professional soccer league created by the United States Soccer Federation (USSF) in 2010 to last just one season, as a compromise between the feuding United Soccer Leagues (USL) and the North American Soccer League (NASL).

St. Louis played their home games at the Anheuser-Busch Center in nearby Fenton, Missouri. The team's colors are green, white and yellow. The team began the season coached by Claude Anelka, the older brother of French international striker Nicolas Anelka, but Dale Schilly replaced Anelka as head coach 24 June 2010.

== Preseason ==
On March 19, 2010, AC St. Louis and the Kansas City Wizards started what is expected to be an annual rivalry series of 2 games between the cross-state rivals. The March 19th game was played in Kansas City with the 2nd in St. Louis, Missouri. The wizards won the first game 2–0. The winner will be decided on aggregate score.

March 12, 2010	AC St. Louis	3–2	UMKC Kangaroos	St. Louis, Missouri, United States
7:00 PM	Salvaggione

March 15, 2010	AC St. Louis	4–0	McKendree Bearcats	St. Louis, Missouri, United States

March 19, 2010	Kansas City Wizards	2–0	AC St. Louis	Kansas City, Missouri, United States
5:00 PM	Rocastle; Myers			Stadium: Swope Park

March 24, 2010	SIU Edwardsville Cougars	0–0	AC St. Louis	Edwardsville, Illinois, United States
5:45 PM				Stadium: Ralph Korte Stadium

March 28, 2010	Saint Louis Billikens	2–2	AC St. Louis	St. Louis, Missouri, United States
4:00 PM	Dice; Gabeljc		Stisser; Moore	Stadium: Hermann Stadium; Attendance: 100

March 31, 2010	AC St. Louis	2–0	Western Illinois Leathernecks	St. Louis, Missouri, United States
	Kafedzic 23'; Ambersley			Stadium: Anheuser-Busch Center

April 3, 2010	AC St. Louis	1–2	Kansas City Wizards	St. Louis, Missouri, United States
7:00 PM	Kafedzic 53'	Report	Hercegfalvi 31'; Besler (yellow card) 34'; Hirsig 84'	Stadium: Anheuser-Busch Soccer Park; Attendance: 2,950; Referee: Landis Wiley

== USSF 2 ==
AC St. Louis kicked off their season April 10 at the Carolina Railhawks.

=== Results ===
NASL Conference
Pos	Team	Pld	W	L	T	GF	GA	GD	Pts	Qualification
1	Carolina RailHawks FC	30	13	9	8	44	32	+12	47	Conference leader, qualified for playoffs
2	Vancouver Whitecaps FC	30	10	5	15	32	22	+10	45	Qualified for playoffs (Note: The remaining six teams with the highest point totals, regardless of conference, also advance to the playoffs.)
3	Montreal Impact	30	12	11	7	36	30	+6	43	Qualified for playoffs
4	Miami FC	30	7	11	12	37	49	−12	33	
5	AC St. Louis	30	7	15	8	32	48	−16	29	
6	Crystal Palace Baltimore	30	6	18	6	24	55	−31	24	

Source: USSF D-2 schedule table
Notes:

April 10, 2010	Carolina RailHawks FC	2–0	AC St. Louis	Cary, North Carolina, United States
7:00 PM	Barbara 4', 25'; Gardner (yellow card) 75'	Report	Kante (yellow card) 63'	Stadium: WakeMed Soccer Park; Attendance: 2,013; Referee: Andrew Chapin

April 17, 2010	AC St. Louis	1–2	Austin Aztex	St. Louis, Missouri, United States
1:56 PM	O'Garro 43', (yellow card) 77'; Velten (yellow card) 73'; Kante (yellow card) 76'; Kafedzic (yellow card) 86'	Report	Alvarez (yellow card) 20'; Johnson 37'; Griffin 56'; Callahan (yellow card) 82'	Stadium: Anheuser-Busch Center; Attendance: 5,696; Referee: Landis Wiley

April 22, 2010	Portland Timbers	3–0	AC St. Louis	Portland, Oregon, United States
9:00 PM	Pore 1', 45+'; Obatola 62'; Suzuki (yellow card) 73'	Report	Traynor (yellow card) 13'; Nzinga (yellow card) 67'	Stadium: PGE Park; Attendance: 5,893; Referee: Reyes

April 24, 2010	Vancouver Whitecaps FC	1–0	AC St. Louis	Burnaby, British Columbia, Canada
6:00 PM	Akloul 19'	Report		Stadium: Swangard Stadium; Attendance: 4,815; Referee: Justin Tasev

May 1, 2010	AC St. Louis	1–0	Crystal Palace Baltimore	St. Louis, Missouri, United States
7:10 PM	Kante 1', (yellow card)	Report	Mbuta (yellow card)	Stadium: Anheuser-Busch Center; Attendance: 2,985

May 8, 2010	Rochester Rhinos	2–1	AC St. Louis	Rochester, New York, United States
8:00 PM	Hamilton 43'; Heins 74'; Short (yellow card); Sanfilippo (yellow card)	Report	Ambersley 49'; Cole (yellow card)	Stadium: Marina Auto Stadium; Attendance: 1,447; Referee: Sorin Stoica

May 15, 2010	Portland Timbers	1–1	AC St. Louis	Portland, Oregon
5:00 PM	Marcelin (yellow card) 43'; Keita 66'	Report	Ambersley 90'; Moore (yellow card) 90'	Stadium: PGE Park; Attendance: 10,057; Referee: Guzman

May 22, 2010	AC St. Louis	0–3	FC Tampa Bay	St. Louis, Missouri, United States
7:10 PM	Velten (red card) 42'; Traynor (yellow card) 73' (yellow-red card) 89'	Report	Valentin (yellow card) 17'; Milien 37'; Adjeman-Pamboe (yellow card) 45' (goal) 64'; Tan 90' (pen.)	Stadium: Anheuser-Busch Center; Attendance: 3,402

May 29, 2010	NSC Minnesota Stars	3–2	AC St. Louis	Blaine, Minnesota, United States
7:00 PM	Wasson 41'; Altman 72'; Hlavaty 87'	Report	Kreamalmeyer 25'; Gauchinho 69'	Stadium: National Sports Center; Attendance: 1,562

June 12, 2010	Puerto Rico Islanders	0–1	AC St. Louis	Bayamón, Puerto Rico
8:05 PM		Report	Stisser 41'	Stadium: Juan Ramón Loubriel Stadium; Attendance: 2,098

June 26, 2010	AC St. Louis	0–0	Vancouver Whitecaps FC	St. Louis, Missouri, United States
7:10 PM		Report	Stewart (yellow card) 65' (red card)	Stadium: Anheuser-Busch Center; Attendance: 2,432

July 3, 2010	AC St. Louis	0–2	Carolina Railhawks	St. Louis, Missouri, United States
7:10 PM	Traynor (yellow card) 60'	Report	Kabwe 17' (yellow card) 82'; Lowery (yellow card) 45'; Gardner 62'	Stadium: Anheuser-Busch Center; Attendance: 2,122

July 8, 2010	Vancouver Whitecaps FC	1–1	AC St. Louis	Burnaby, British Columbia, Canada
5:30 PM	Edwini-Bonsu 87'	Report	Bloom 72'	Stadium: Swangard Stadium; Attendance: 5,185

July 10, 2010	AC St. Louis	3–0	Montreal Impact	St. Louis, Missouri, United States
7:10 PM	Cole (yellow card) 52'; Salvaggione 57'; Kreamalmeyer 62'; Cosgriff 78'	Report	Pastel (yellow card) 38'; Testo (yellow card) 58' (yellow-red card) 72'	Stadium: Anheuser-Busch Center; Attendance: 2,307

July 14, 2010	NSC Minnesota Stars	2–2	AC St. Louis	Blaine, Minnesota, United States
7:00 PM	Kallman (yellow card) 56'; Cvilikas 88'; Moura 90+1'	Report	Cosgriff 43'; Salvaggione (yellow card) 62' (goal) 65'	Stadium: National Sports Center; Attendance: 2,091

July 17, 2010	Austin Aztex	2–0	AC St. Louis	Austin, Texas, United States
7:30 PM	J. Watson 35' (pen.); M. Griffin 68'; Johnson (yellow card) 85'	Report	Dufty (yellow card) 15'; Bauer (yellow card) 25'; Cosgriff (red card) 34'; Traynor (yellow card) 82'	Stadium: House Park; Attendance: 3,702

July 21, 2010	Montreal Impact	3–0	AC St. Louis	Montreal, Quebec, Canada
6:30 PM	Pizzolitto (yellow card) 10'; Agourram 24'; Donatelli 29' (yellow card) 36'; Pastel (red card) 67'; Ribeiro 82'	Report	Kreamalmeyer (yellow card) 49'; Gauchinho (red card) 67'; Traynor (yellow card) 71'	Stadium: Saputo Stadium; Attendance: 10,864

July 24, 2010	Crystal Palace Baltimore	0–1	AC St. Louis	Germantown, Maryland, United States
3:00 PM	Robson (red card) 89'	Report	Ambersley 74'; Bauer (yellow card) 81'	Stadium: Maryland SoccerPlex; Attendance: 701

July 28, 2010	AC St. Louis	3–0	Portland Timbers	St. Louis, Missouri, United States
7:10 PM	Ambersley 26', 27', 57'; Cole (yellow card) 44'; O'Garro (yellow card) 72'	Report		Stadium: Anheuser-Busch Center; Attendance: 2,256

August 1, 2010	AC St. Louis	2–2	NSC Minnesota Stars	St. Louis, Missouri, United States
5:00 PM	Kreamalmeyer 42', 86' (pen.)	Report	Tarley 83'; Cvilikas 90'; Rodriguez (yellow card) 90+'	Stadium: Anheuser-Busch Center; Attendance: 2,037

August 6, 2010	AC St. Louis	0–0	Vancouver Whitecaps FC	St. Louis, Missouri, United States
7:10 PM	Cole (yellow card) 60'	Report	Bellisomo (yellow card) 50'; Janicki (yellow card) 85'	Stadium: Anheuser-Busch Center; Attendance: 2,312

August 14, 2010	AC St. Louis	0–1	Portland Timbers	St. Louis, Missouri, United States
7:00 PM	Traynor (yellow card) 7'	Report	Nimo (yellow card) 7'; Purdy (yellow card) 13'; Dike 41'	Stadium: Anheuser-Busch Center; Attendance: 2649

August 20, 2010	AC St. Louis	1 - 1	Puerto Rico Islanders	St. Louis, Missouri, United States
6:10	Velten (yellow card) 4'; Ambersley 42' (pen.)	Report	Adderly 18'	Stadium: Anheuser-Busch Center; Attendance: 2241

August 29, 2010	FC Tampa Bay	2 - 2	AC St. Louis	Tampa, Florida, United States
7:00 PM	Steele 43'; Diaz 90'; Nyazamba (yellow card)	Report	Own goal 5'; Ambersley 18'; Kreamalmeyer (yellow card)	Stadium: George M. Steinbrenner Field; Attendance: 3389

September 5, 2010	Miami FC	1 - 3	AC St. Louis	Miami, Florida, United States
5:00 PM	Gomez (yellow card) 45'; Thompson (yellow card) 62' (goal) 63'	Report	Stisser 19'; Traynor (yellow card) 58'; Ambersley 71'; Lancaster 75'; Videira (yellow card) 85'	Stadium: FIU Stadium; Attendance: 2403

September 11, 2010	AC St. Louis	v	NSC Minnesota Stars	St. Louis, Missouri, United States
				Stadium: Anheuser-Busch Center

September 18, 2010	AC St. Louis	v	Austin Aztex	St. Louis, Missouri, United States
				Stadium: Anheuser-Busch Center

September 22, 2010	Portland Timbers	v	AC St. Louis	Portland, Oregon, United States
				Stadium: PGE Park

September 25, 2010	Austin Aztex	v	AC St. Louis	Austin, Texas, United States
				Stadium: House Park

October 2010	AC St. Louis	v	Rochester Rhinos	St. Louis, Missouri, United States
				Stadium: Anheuser-Busch Center

== Players ==
=== Roster ===
Note: Flags indicate national team as defined under FIFA eligibility rules; some limited exceptions apply. Players may hold more than one non-FIFA nationality.

No.	Pos.	Nation	Player
1	GK	USA	Alec Dufty
2	DF	USA	Zach Bauer
3	MF	USA	Troy Cole
4	DF	USA	Tim Velten
5	DF	USA	Jack Traynor
6	DF	USA	John Lesko
7	MF	USA	Luke Kreamalmeyer
8	DF	TRI	Anthony O'Garro
9	FW	BIH	Elvir Kafedzic
10	MF	USA	Hagop Chirishian
11	MF	USA	Chris Salvaggione
12	MF	USA	Gilbert Pogosyan

No.	Pos.	Nation	Player
13	MF	BRA	Gauchinho
15	MF	USA	Mike Ambersley
17	MF	USA	Brad Stisser
20	MF	USA	Jeff Cosgriff
21	DF	USA	Mark Bloom
22	GK	USA	Chad Becker
23	MF	USA	Ryan Moore
24	FW	BRA	Alex Titton
26	DF	USA	Dillon Barna
30	MF	USA	Luis Gil (on loan from Real Salt Lake)
31	MF	USA	Michael Videira

=== Staff ===
- (United States) Dale Schilly Head Coach
- (United States) John Vanbuskirk Assistant Coach
- (United States) Tim Leonard Assistant Coach
- (United States) Blake Decker Assistant Coach
- (United States) Tim Owens General Manager
- (United States) Paul Rogers Goalkeeper Coach

== Statistics ==
=== Overall ===
Games played	25
Games won	6
Games lost	11
Games drawn	8
Goals scored	25 (1.00 per match)
Goals conceded	34 (1.36 per match)
Goal difference	-9
Clean sheets	7
Yellow cards	30
Red cards	4
Worst discipline	(United States) Jack Traynor ( 7 (yellow card) , 1 (red card) )
Best result(s)	3-0 (H) v Montreal Impact - 10 July 2010
Best result(s)	3-0 (H) v Portland Timbers - 28 July 2010
Worst result(s)	0-3 (A) v Portland Timbers - 22 April 2010
Worst result(s)	0-3 (H) v FC Tampa Bay - 22 May 2010
Worst result(s)	0-3 (A) v Montreal Impact - 21 July 2010
Most appearances	Mark Bloom and Alec Dufty with 24 appearances
Top scorer	(United States) Mike Ambersley (9 goals)
Top assistant	(United States) Luke Kreamalmeyer (5 assists)
Points	26/75 (34.7%)

Last updated: 6 August
Source: USSF

=== Top scorers ===
Includes all competitive matches. The list is sorted by shirt number when total goals are equal.

Position	Nation	Number	Name	USSF Division 2	U.S. Open Cup	Total
1	(United States)	15	Mike Ambersley	9	2	11
2	(United States)	7	Luke Kreamalmeyer	4	0	4
	(United States)	11	Chris Salvaggione	2	0	2
	(United States)	17	Brad Stisser	2	0	2
	(United States)	20	Jeff Cosgriff	2	0	2
3	(Trinidad and Tobago)	8	Anthony O'Garro	1	0	1
	(Brazil)	13	Gauchinho	1	0	1
	(Mali)	19	Manuel Kante†	1	0	1
	(United States)	21	Mark Bloom	1	0	1

Last updated: 6 August
Source: USSF

† = Player is no longer with the club but still scored a goal during the season.
