= 2010 Real Salt Lake season =

American soccer team season

Real Salt Lake
2010 season
- Owner: SCP Worldwide
- Coach: Jason Kreis
- Stadium: Rio Tinto Stadium
- Major League Soccer: 2nd
- MLS Cup: Conf. Semifinals
- U.S. Open Cup: Did not qualify
- CONCACAF Champions League: Finals
- Carolina Challenge Cup: Runners-up
- Top goalscorer: League: Álvaro Saborío; All: Álvaro Saborío (18)
- Highest home attendance: 20,463 vs Cruz Azul (October 19)
- Lowest home attendance: 11,579 vs Toronto (September 15)
- Average home league attendance: 18,764
- Biggest win: RSL 5-0 NE (7/2)
- Biggest defeat: DAL 3-1 RSL (7/17)
Home colors	Away colors	Third colors

The 2010 Real Salt Lake season was the sixth year of the club's existence. It was also the sixth year for the club in Major League Soccer and the sixth-consecutive year for the club in the top-flight of American soccer.

Real Salt Lake entered the 2010 MLS season as the defending MLS Cup champions, and participated additionally in the CONCACAF Champions League and played play-in propers of the U.S. Open Cup. During 2010, the club had the most success ever in its history, finishing second place in Major League Soccer, as well as becoming the first American-based club to win a Champions League group; in which they won Group A with a 4–1–1 record. Salt Lake played two play in propers of the Open Cup before eventually falling out against D.C. United.

In the MLS Cup playoffs, Salt Lake was paired against FC Dallas, the eventual Cup runners-up, where the Royals fell 3–2 on aggregate in the quarterfinals.

== Overview ==
=== March ===
Real Salt Lake opened the season with a 3–0 road victory against San Jose.
MLS: 1-0-0, 3 points, 3 goals for, 0 goals against

=== April ===
RSL began April with a 2–1 loss to Houston, losing after the Dynamo earned two penalty kicks just a minute apart. Upon heading back to Sandy, they played to a 2–2 draw against Seattle, with Álvaro Saborío scoring the equalizer in second half stoppage time, in front of a full stadium with a crowd over 20,000. A week later, they headed to Los Angeles to take on the Galaxy, the team they had defeated on penalty kicks to win MLS Cup 2009. Despite losing 2–1, Real became the first team to score on the Galaxy in the 2010 Season, as Los Angeles had shut out their first three opponents. RSL finished April with a 1–0 loss to the reigning Supporters' Shield winners, the Columbus Crew.
MLS: 0-3-1, 1 point, 4 goals for, 7 goals against

=== May ===
RSL began with a hard-fought 2–1 home victory over Toronto. They then hosted for the first time the new expansion team, Philadelphia, winning 3–0. The next week, they defeated Houston, who had beaten them at home in Houston in April, with a decisive 3–1 win. Going on the road to Los Angeles to face expansion partners Chivas USA, RSL found victory when Fabián Espíndola scored in the 89th minute for the game-winner in the 2–1 win. RSL finished the month with a close 4–1 win over Kansas City in Sandy. Both the five-game win streak and the 15-game home unbeaten streak held by RSL at the end of May are franchise-highs.
MLS: 5-0-0, 15 points, 14 goals for, 4 goals against

=== June ===
After a disappointing scoreless draw on the road against D.C. United, RSL returned home to hand Los Angeles their first loss of the season by a score of 1–0 on a controversial Javier Morales goal. After a two-week hiatus due to the 2010 FIFA World Cup, RSL drew San Jose 0-0.
MLS: 1-0-2, 5 points, 1 goal for, 0 goals against

=== July ===
July saw Robbie Findley return from World Cup play for Nick Rimando's 100th MLS win – a 5–0 drubbing of New England. They took their aggressive playing style on the road, beating the Chicago Fire 1–0. Their 10-game unbeaten streak came to an end against FC Dallas at Dallas, followed by a disappointing home draw against Chivas USA. They were back in form against D.C. United, and came away with a 3–0 win.
MLS: 3-1-1, 10 points, 10 goals for, 3 goals against

=== August ===
RSL's good fortunes continued in August, as the team went undefeated in league play. The month opened with four games in twelve days – three league games and RSL's first CONCACAF Champions League game. After playing to a 1–1 draw with Kansas City at CommunityAmerica Ballpark, RSL paid its first visit to Philadelphia's new PPL Park, earning a point in a 1–1 draw with the Union. RSL headed back to Rio Tinto Stadium to face its 2009 Eastern Conference Semifinals nemesis Columbus. RSL won the game 2–0 on a Morales brace. The team then geared up to begin Group A play in the 2010-11 CONCACAF Champions League. RSL defeated Panamanian champions Árabe Unido in Sandy by a score of 2–1 in a wild match that featured over eight minutes of second-half stoppage time. A week later, the team traveled to Estadio Azul to play Mexico's Cruz Azul. Though RSL led 3–2 after 87 minutes, a crazy finish left Real empty-handed, falling 5–4. The team finished the month with an MLS scoreless affair at BMO Field in Toronto, leaving the team in third place on the table at 40 points with eight league games remaining.
MLS: 1-0-3, 6 points, 4 goals for, 2 goals against; CCL: 1-1-0, 3 points, 6 goals for, 6 goals against

=== September ===
September was another spectacular run for RSL, culminating in qualifying for the MLS Playoffs and the CONCACAF Champion's League quarterfinals.

== Squad ==
=== 2010 roster ===
Note: Flags indicate national team as defined under FIFA eligibility rules; some limited exceptions apply. Players may hold more than one non-FIFA nationality.

No.	Pos.	Nation	Player
1	GK	USA	Tim Melia
2	DF	USA	Tony Beltran
3	DF	GHA	Robbie Russell
4	DF	COL	Jámison Olave
5	MF	USA	Kyle Beckerman (captain)
6	DF	USA	Nat Borchers
7	MF	USA	Alex Nimo
8	FW	CAN	Will Johnson
10	FW	USA	Robbie Findley
11	MF	ARG	Javier Morales
12	MF	HAI	Jean Alexandre
15	FW	CRC	Álvaro Saborío
16	FW	ARG	Fabián Espíndola

No.	Pos.	Nation	Player
17	DF	USA	Chris Wingert
18	GK	USA	Nick Rimando
19	FW	BRA	Pablo Campos
20	MF	USA	Ned Grabavoy
21	MF	USA	Luis Gil
22	MF	ARG	Nelson González
23	FW	BRA	Paulo Araujo Jr.
24	GK	USA	Kyle Reynish
26	MF	USA	Collen Warner
28	DF	USA	Chris Schuler
30	DF	USA	Rauwshan McKenzie
33	DF	USA	David Horst
77	MF	JAM	Andy Williams

== Transfers ==
=== In ===
Date	Player	Previous club	Fee	Ref
February 10, 2010	(United States) Rauwshan McKenzie	Unattached	Free	
February 23, 2010	(United States) Luis Gil	(United States) Kansas City Wizards	Trade	
March 14, 2010	(Costa Rica) Álvaro Saborío	(Switzerland) Sion	Free	
March 18, 2010	(United States) Tim Melia	(United States) Rochester Rhinos	Free	
September 9, 2010	(Brazil) Paulo Araujo Jr.	(United States) Miami	Loan	

=== Out ===
Date	Player	Destination Club	Fee	Ref
July 6, 2009	(Armenia) Yura Movsisyan	(Denmark) Randers	Free	
November 26, 2009	(United States) Chris Seitz	(United States) Philadelphia Union	Trade	
January 14, 2010	(United States) Clint Mathis	(United States) Los Angeles Galaxy	Trade	
February 12, 2010	(Netherlands) Rachid El Khalifi	Retired	Retired	

=== Loan ===
Date	Player	Transferred to	Fee	Ref
April 2, 2010	(United States) David Horst	Puerto Rico Islanders	Loan	
April 2, 2010	(United States) Tim Melia	(United States) Charleston Battery	Loan	
August 1, 2010	(United States) Luis Gil	(United States) AC St. Louis	Loan	

== Statistics ==
=== Appearances and goals ===
Last updated on 17 November 2010.

No.	Pos	Nat	Player	Total		MLS		CONCACAF Champions League		U.S. Open Cup		Carolina Challenge Cup	
No.	Pos	Nat	Player	Apps	Goals	Apps	Goals	Apps	Goals	Apps	Goals	Apps	Goals
1	GK	(United States) USA	Tim Melia	0	0	0+0	0	0	0	0+0	0	0+0	0
2	DF	(United States) USA	Tony Beltran	23	0	17+1	0	3	0	2+0	0	0+0	0
3	DF	(Ghana) GHA	Robbie Russell	29	0	21+1	0	5	0	1+1	0	0+0	0
4	DF	(Colombia) COL	Jámison Olave	31	3	27+0	2	4	1	0+0	0	0+0	0
5	MF	(United States) USA	Kyle Beckerman	29	1	21+1	0	5	1	0+1	0	1+0	0
6	DF	(United States) USA	Nat Borchers	37	2	30+0	1	5	0	2+0	1	0+0	0
7	MF	(United States) USA	Alex Nimo	1	0	0+0	0	0	0	0+0	0	1+0	0
8	FW	(Canada) CAN	Will Johnson	36	6	24+4	1	6	3	2+0	2	0+0	0
10	FW	(United States) USA	Robbie Findley	34	9	15+9	5	2+4	1	1+0	1	3+0	2
11	MF	(Argentina) ARG	Javier Morales	31	8	25+1	7	4	1	0+1	0	0+0	0
12	DF	(Haiti) HAI	Jean Alexandre	20	0	5+10	0	3	0	2+0	0	0+0	0
15	FW	(Costa Rica) CRC	Álvaro Saborío	35	18	23+4	12	5	6	1+1	0	1+0	0
16	FW	(Argentina) ARG	Fabián Espíndola	28	6	19+3	5	3	1	0+2	0	1+0	0
17	DF	(United States) USA	Chris Wingert	30	5	22+2	5	4	0	1+0	0	0+1	0
18	GK	(United States) USA	Nick Rimando	33	0	27+0	0	5	0	0+0	0	1+0	0
19	MF	(United States) USA	Ned Grabavoy	31	0	18+5	0	6	0	1+0	0	1+0	0
21	MF	(United States) USA	Luis Gil	2	0	0+0	0	1	0	0+0	0	1+0	0
22	MF	(Argentina) ARG	Nelson González	18	2	3+9	1	4	0	1+0	1	0+1	0
23	FW	(Brazil) BRA	Paulo Araujo Jr.	6	4	0+3	0	2	3	0+0	0	1+0	1
24	GK	(United States) USA	Kyle Reynish	7	2	3+0	0	1	0	2+0	0	1+0	2
26	MF	(United States) USA	Collen Warner	18	1	4+9	0	3	1	2+0	0	0+0	0
28	DF	(United States) USA	Chris Schuler	4	0	1+0	0	1	0	1+0	0	1+0	0
30	DF	(United States) USA	Rauwshan McKenzie	9	0	2+2	0	2	0	2+0	0	1+0	0
33	DF	(United States) USA	David Horst	0	0	0+0	0	0	0	0	0	0	0
77	MF	(Jamaica) JAM	Andy Williams	36	0	20+10	0	5+0	0	0+1	0	0	0

=== Formation ===
Starting XI vs. Colorado on Oct. 23:

=== Overall ===
Games played	40 (30 MLS, 6 CONCACAF Champions League, 2 MLS Playoffs, 2 U.S. Open Cup)
Games won	20 (15 MLS, 4 CONCACAF Champions League, 1 U.S. Open Cup)
Games drawn	13 (11 MLS, 1 CONCACAF Champions League, 1 MLS Playoffs)
Games lost	7 (4 MLS, 1 CONCACAF Champions League, 1 MLS Playoffs, 1 U.S. Open Cup)
Goals scored	66
Goals conceded	36
Goal difference	+30
Clean sheets	15
Yellow cards	64
Red cards	1
Worst discipline	(Colombia) Jámison Olave 10 (yellow card) 0 (red card)
Best result(s)	W 5–0 (H) v New England – Major League Soccer – 2 July 2010
Worst result(s)	L 2–0 (A) v Dallas – Major League Soccer – 17 July 2010
Most appearances	(United States) Nat Borchers (37)
Top scorer	(Costa Rica) Álvaro Saborío (18)
Points	Overall: 56/90 (62.22%)

Last updated: 17 November 2010
Source: Competitions' Wikipedia articles.

== Club ==
=== Coaching staff ===
Position	Staff
General Manager	(United States) Garth Lagerwey
Head coach	(United States) Jason Kreis
Assistant coach	(United States) Robin Fraser
Assistant coach	(United States) Miles Joseph
Assistant coach	(United States) Jeff Cassar
Strength and conditioning Coach	(United States) Dan Barlow
Team Administrator	(United States) Elliot Fall
Equipment Manager	(United States) Kevin Harter
Assistant Equipment Manager	(United States) Mike Rigby
Head Athletic Trainer	(United States) Jake Joachim
Head Team Physician	(United States) Andrew Cooper
Team Orthopedist	(United States) Dr. Mark Scholl
U-17 Head Coach	(United States) Greg Maas
U-17 Assistant Coach	(Bosnia and Herzegovina) Nermin Sasivarĕvić

Updated to match played 20 October 2010
Source: Real Salt Lake

=== Management ===
Owner/Chairman	(United States) Dave Checketts
President	(United States) Bill Manning
Chief Financial Officer	(United States) Gary Reimer
Sporting Director and Director of Youth Development	(United States) Rob Karas
Ground (capacity and dimensions)	Rio Tinto Stadium (20,008 / 103x67 meters)

Updated to match played 20 October 2010
Source: Real Salt Lake

== Competitions ==
=== Overall ===
Competition	Started round	Current position / round	Final position / round	First match	Last match
MLS	—	—	2nd	March 27	October 23
CONCACAF Champions League	Group Stage	Finals		August 18, 2010	April 27, 2011
U.S. Open Cup	Qualifier	—	Qualification final	April 14	June 2
Carolina Challenge Cup	Group Stage	—	Runner-up	March 13	March 20

Updated to match played 20 October 2010
Source: Competitions

== Major League Soccer ==
=== League table ===
Conference

Pos	Team	Pld	W	L	T	GF	GA	GD	Pts	Qualification
1	LA Galaxy	30	18	7	5	44	26	+18	59	Qualification for the conference semifinals
2	Real Salt Lake	30	15	4	11	45	20	+25	56	Qualification for the conference semifinals
3	FC Dallas	30	12	4	14	42	28	+14	50	Qualification for the conference semifinals
4	Seattle Sounders FC	30	14	10	6	39	35	+4	48	Qualification for the conference semifinals
5	Colorado Rapids	30	12	8	10	44	32	+12	46	Qualification for the conference semifinals
6	San Jose Earthquakes	30	13	10	7	34	33	+1	46	Qualification for the conference semifinals
7	Houston Dynamo	30	9	15	6	40	49	−9	33	
8	Chivas USA	30	8	18	4	31	45	−14	28	

Source: MLS

Overall

Pos	Team	Pld	W	L	T	GF	GA	GD	Pts	
1	LA Galaxy (S)	30	18	7	5	44	26	+18	59	Qualification for the CONCACAF Champions League
2	Real Salt Lake	30	15	4	11	45	20	+25	56	
3	New York Red Bulls	30	15	9	6	38	29	+9	51	
4	FC Dallas	30	12	4	14	42	28	+14	50	Qualification for the CONCACAF Champions League
5	Columbus Crew	30	14	8	8	40	34	+6	50	
6	Seattle Sounders FC (U)	30	14	10	6	39	35	+4	48	Qualification for the CONCACAF Champions League
7	Colorado Rapids (C)	30	12	8	10	44	32	+12	46	Qualification for the CONCACAF Champions League
8	San Jose Earthquakes	30	13	10	7	34	33	+1	46	
9	Kansas City Wizards	30	11	13	6	36	35	+1	39	
10	Chicago Fire	30	9	12	9	37	38	−1	36	
11	Toronto FC (V)	30	9	13	8	33	41	−8	35	Qualification for the CONCACAF Champions League
12	Houston Dynamo	30	9	15	6	40	49	−9	33	
13	New England Revolution	30	9	16	5	32	50	−18	32	
14	Philadelphia Union	30	8	15	7	35	49	−14	31	
15	Chivas USA	30	8	18	4	31	45	−14	28	
16	D.C. United	30	6	20	4	21	47	−26	22	

Source: MLS
Rules for classification: 1) points; 2) head-to-head record; 3) goal difference; 4) number of goals scored
(C) MLS Cup champions; (S) Supporters' Shield winners; (U) U.S. Open Cup winners; (V) Canadian Championship winners

=== Results summary ===
Overall								Home						Away					
Pld	Pts	W	L	T	GF	GA	GD	W	L	T	GF	GA	GD	W	L	T	GF	GA	GD
30	56	15	4	11	45	20	+25	11	0	4	31	7	+24	4	4	7	14	13	+1

Last updated: September 26, 2010
Source: Major League Soccer
Pld = Matches played; Pts = Points; W = Matches won; T = Matches tied; L = Matches lost; GF = Goals for; GA = Goals against; GD = Goal difference

Round	1	2	3	4	5	6	7	8	9	10	11	12	13	14	15	16	17	18	19	20	21	22	23	24	25	26	27	28	29	30
Stadium	A	A	H	A	A	H	H	H	A	H	A	H	H	H	A	A	H	H	A	A	H	A	H	A	H	H	A	A	H	A
Result	W	L	T	L	L	W	W	W	W	W	T	W	T	W	W	L	T	W	T	T	W	T	W	T	W	T	W	T	W	T
Position	2	7	7	10	13	9	5	5	3	3	3	3	3	3	2	3	3	2	3	3	3	3	3	2	2	2	2	2	2	2

Updated to match(es) played on September 26, 2010. Source: MLS Results and League table
A = Away; H = Home; W = Win; L = Loss; T = Tie

=== Regular season ===
Win Tie Loss

=== March ===
March 27, 2010	San Jose Earthquakes	0–3	Real Salt Lake	Santa Clara, California
6:00 p.m. PT	McDonald (yellow card) 58'; Leitch (red card) 53'; Opara (yellow card) 90'	ESPN Report; MLS Recap	Morales 14'; Espindola 27'; Grabavoy (yellow card) 39'; Morales 54'; Olave (yellow card) 65'	Stadium: Buck Shaw Stadium; Attendance: 10,589; Referee: Jorge González

=== April ===
April 1, 2010	Houston Dynamo	2–1	Real Salt Lake	Houston, Texas
8:00 p.m. CT	Davis 53' (pen.); Davis 55' (pen.); Boswell (yellow card) 90'	Report	Morales 16'; Wingert (yellow card) 45'; Olave (yellow card) 55'; Espindola (yellow card) 90'	Stadium: Robertson Stadium; Attendance: 18,197; Referee: Jair Marrufo

April 10, 2010	Real Salt Lake	2–2	Seattle Sounders FC	Sandy, Utah
7:00 p.m. MT	Johnson 53'; Wingert (yellow card) 59'; Saborio 90+4'	Report 1 Report 2	Zakuani 11'; Marshall (yellow card) 56'; Borchers 72' (o.g.)	Stadium: Rio Tinto Stadium; Attendance: 19,970; Referee: Abbey Okulaja

April 17, 2010	Los Angeles Galaxy	2–1	Real Salt Lake	Carson, California
7:30 p.m. PT	Buddle 11'; Buddle 76'	Report	Beckerman 40'; Williams (yellow card) 56'	Stadium: The Home Depot Center; Attendance: 20,344; Referee: Mark Geiger

April 24, 2010	Columbus Crew	1–0	Real Salt Lake	Columbus, Ohio
7:30 p.m. ET	Schelotto 38' (pen.)	Report	Beckerman (yellow card) 50'	Stadium: Columbus Crew Stadium; Attendance: 14,322; Referee: Steven DePiero

=== May ===
May 1, 2010	Real Salt Lake	2–1	Toronto FC	Sandy, Utah
7:00 p.m. MT	Olave 14'; Williams 42'	Report	De Rosario 88' (pen.)	Stadium: Rio Tinto Stadium; Attendance: 12,659; Referee: Kevin Stott

May 8, 2010	Real Salt Lake	3–0	Philadelphia Union	Sandy, Utah
2:00 p.m. MT	Williams (yellow card) 17'; Beckerman 27'; Beckerman (yellow card) 41'; Olave 51'; Saborío 70'; Borchers (yellow card) 81'	Report	Arrieta (yellow card) 50'	Stadium: Rio Tinto Stadium; Attendance: 14,224; Referee: Hilario Grajeda

May 13, 2010	Real Salt Lake	3–1	Houston Dynamo	Sandy, Utah
7:00 p.m. MT	Findley 3'; Saborío 24'; Borchers (yellow card) 26'; Saborío 60'	Report	Chabala (yellow card) 33'; Mullan 72'; Boswell (yellow card) 77'	Stadium: Rio Tinto Stadium; Attendance: 12,945; Referee: Alex Prus

May 22, 2010	Chivas USA	1–2	Real Salt Lake	Carson, California
7:30 p.m. PT	Saragosa (yellow card) 26'; Braun 80'	Report	Williams (yellow card) 39'; Wingert 45+1'; Alexandre (yellow card) 66'; Espíndola 89'	Stadium: Home Depot Center; Attendance: 14,287; Referee: Yader Reyes

May 29, 2010	Real Salt Lake	4–1	Kansas City Wizards	Sandy, Utah
7:00 p.m. MT	Olave (yellow card) 29'; Espíndola 31'; Saborío 34'; Russell 84'; Grabavoy 90+2'	Report	Besler (yellow card) 27'; Kamara (yellow card) 32'; Wolff 42'; Conrad (yellow card) 73'; Arnaud (yellow card) 82' (yellow-red card) 82'	Stadium: Rio Tinto Stadium; Attendance: 15,588; Referee: Ricardo Salazar

=== June ===
June 5, 2010	D.C. United	0–0	Real Salt Lake	Washington, D.C.
7:30 p.m. ET		Report		Stadium: RFK Stadium; Attendance: 15,328; Referee: Jair Marrufo

June 9, 2010	Real Salt Lake	1–0	Los Angeles Galaxy	Sandy, Utah
7:00 p.m. MT	Williams (yellow card) 63'; Morales 80'; Morales (yellow card) 81'	Report	Juninho (yellow card) 20'; Gonzalez (yellow card) 85'	Stadium: Rio Tinto Stadium; Attendance: 19,513; Referee: Edvin Jurisevic

June 25, 2010	Real Salt Lake	0–0	San Jose Earthquakes	Sandy, Utah
7:00 p.m. MT	Campos (yellow card) 87'	Report	Corrales (yellow card) 58'; Busch (yellow card) 60'	Stadium: Rio Tinto Stadium; Attendance: 16,216; Referee: Silviu Petrescu

=== July ===
July 2, 2010	Real Salt Lake	5–0	New England Revolution	Sandy, Utah
8:00 p.m. MT	Espíndola (yellow card) 22'; Espindola 27'; Olave 45+2'; Wingert (yellow card) 47'; Saborío 52'; Saborío 57'; Findley 85'	Report		Stadium: Rio Tinto Stadium; Attendance: 19,101; Referee: Kevin Stott

July 8, 2010	Chicago Fire	0–1	Real Salt Lake	Bridgeview, Illinois
8:30 p.m. CT	Conde (yellow card) 51'	Report	Findley 40' (pen.); Johnson (yellow card) 69'; Espíndola (yellow card) 90'	Stadium: Toyota Park; Attendance: 17,847; Referee: Terry Vaughn

July 17, 2010	FC Dallas	2–0	Real Salt Lake	Frisco, Texas
7:30 p.m. CT	Ihemelu (yellow card) 40'; Ferreira (yellow card) 68'; Shea 69'; Harris 77'	Report	Johnson (yellow card) 42'	Stadium: Pizza Hut Park; Attendance: 11,170; Referee: Hilario Grajeda

July 24, 2010	Real Salt Lake	1–1	Chivas USA	Sandy, Utah
8:00 p.m. MT	Beckerman (yellow card) 51'; Grabavoy 66'; Saborío (yellow card) 82'	Report	Espinoza (yellow card) 28'; Trujillo (yellow card) 54'; Padilla 70'; Kennedy (yellow card) 78'	Stadium: Rio Tinto Stadium; Attendance: 19,469; Referee: Mark Geiger

July 31, 2010	Real Salt Lake	3–0	D.C. United	Sandy, Utah
7:00 p.m. MT	Saborío 13'; Wingert (yellow card) 58'; Findley 79'; González 94+'	Report	Talley (yellow card) 17'; Bošković (yellow card) 17'; Najar (yellow card) 67'	Stadium: Rio Tinto Stadium; Attendance: 17,719; Referee: Ramón Hernández

=== August ===
August 7, 2010	Kansas City Wizards	1–1	Real Salt Lake	Kansas City, Kansas
7:30 p.m. CT	Kamara 21'; Smith (yellow card) 29'; Bunbury (yellow card) 71'	Report	Morales (yellow card) 22'; Johnson (yellow card) 31'; Findley 33'; Borchers (yellow card) 41'; Grabavoy (yellow card) 61'	Stadium: CommunityAmerica Ballpark; Attendance: 10,385; Referee: Paul Ward

August 11, 2010	Philadelphia Union	1–1	Real Salt Lake	Chester, Pennsylvania
7:30 p.m. ET	Fred (yellow card) 2'; Mwanga 8'; Torres (yellow card) 93+'	Report	Espindola 17'; González (yellow card) 37'; Alexandre (yellow card) 50'; McKenzie (yellow card) 60'; Borchers (yellow card) 79'	Stadium: PPL Park; Referee: David Gantar

August 14, 2010	Real Salt Lake	2–0	Columbus Crew	Sandy, Utah
7:00 MT	Morales 11'; Morales 60'	Report	Hejduk (yellow card) 48'	Stadium: Rio Tinto Stadium; Attendance: 16,906; Referee: Jorge Gonzalez

August 28, 2010	Toronto FC	0–0	Real Salt Lake	Toronto, Ontario, Canada
7:00 p.m. ET		Report	Olave (yellow card) 18'	Stadium: BMO Field; Attendance: 21,047; Referee: Baldomero Toledo

=== September ===
September 4, 2010	Real Salt Lake	1–0	New York Red Bulls	Sandy, Utah
7:00 p.m. MT	Espíndola 4'; Olave (yellow card) 39'	Report	Tchani (yellow card) 18'; Borman (yellow card) 38'; Stammler (yellow card) 74'	Stadium: Rio Tinto Stadium; Attendance: 19,115; Referee: Ricardo Salazar

September 9, 2010	Seattle Sounders FC	0–0	Real Salt Lake	Seattle, Washington
		Report	Saborío (yellow card) 54'	Stadium: Qwest Field; Attendance: 36,078; Referee: Paul Ward

September 18, 2010	Real Salt Lake	1–0	Chicago Fire	Sandy, Utah
2:00 p.m. MT	Beckerman (yellow card) 33'; Saborío 47+' (pen.)	Report	Conde (yellow card) 30' (yellow-red card) 46+'	Stadium: Rio Tinto Stadium; Attendance: 14,440; Referee: Jorge Gonzalez

September 25, 2010	Real Salt Lake	1–1	Colorado Rapids	Sandy, Utah
10:00 p.m. EDT	Campos (yellow card) 32'; Espíndola (yellow card) 66'; Warner (yellow card) 78'; Borchers 90'	Report	Casey (yellow card) 10'; Wynne (yellow card) 16'; Casey 36'; Wallace (yellow card) 82'	Stadium: Rio Tinto Stadium; Attendance: 18,317; Referee: Ramón Hernández

=== October ===
October 2, 2010	New England Revolution	1–2	Real Salt Lake	Foxborough, Massachusetts
	Sinovic (yellow card) 40'; Mansally 82'; Perovic (yellow card) 93+'	Report	Borchers 68'; Grabavoy (yellow card) 41'; Saborío 84'	Stadium: Gillette Stadium; Attendance: 18,130; Referee: Ricardo Salazar

October 9, 2010 Week 28	Real Salt Lake	0–0	New York Red Bulls	Red Bull Arena, Harrison
16:00 EDT	(yellow card) 38' Olave; (yellow card) 39' Beltran	(Report)	Albright (yellow card) 38'; Miller (yellow card) 43'	Attendance: 20,829; Referee: Jair Marrufo

October 16, 2010	Real Salt Lake	2–0	FC Dallas	Sandy, Utah
	Grabavoy 59'; Espindola (yellow card) 75'; Williams (yellow card) 80'; Morales 89'		Pearce (yellow card) 88'	Stadium: Rio Tinto Stadium; Attendance: 20,236; Referee: Baldomero Toledo

October 23, 2010	Colorado Rapids	2–2	Real Salt Lake	Commerce City, Colorado
	Cummings 16'; Casey 51'; Moor (yellow card) 93+'		Olave (yellow card) 54'; Grabavoy (yellow card) 82'; Saborio 91+'; Saborio 95+' (pen.)	Stadium: Dick's Sporting Goods Park; Attendance: 17,729; Referee: Ricardo Salazar

=== MLS Playoffs ===
Real Salt Lake qualified for the 2010 MLS Cup playoffs following a 2–1 victory at New England on October 2. Amid the controversy surrounding the playoff structure, Salt Lake was seeded as the number two team in the Western Conference bracket, drawn against the third-place West team, Dallas. The draw took place at Major League Soccer's headquarters in New York City on October 24.

The Conference Semifinals served as a two-leg, home-and-away aggregate series with no away goals rule enforced. Salt Lake played at Dallas in Pizza Hut Park on October 30. Despite an early goal from Fabian Espindola in the fifth minute, Dallas would rally with a pair of goals from Jeff Cunningham and Eric Avila, giving not only Dallas the victory, but a lead in the a series.

Both clubs would return to Rio Tinto on November 6 for the second leg. A 17th-minute goal from Dax McCarty gave Dallas 3–1 advantage in the series, and not only jeopardized Salt Lake's chance for going on the Western Conference Championship, but the chance RSL would end their home-match unbeaten streak. A goal from Robbie Findley ensured the streak would stay alive, but it was not enough to defeat Dallas on aggregate, as Dallas would advance 3–2 on aggregate.

October 30, 2010 Conf. Semifinals	FC Dallas	2–1	Real Salt Lake	Frisco, Texas
3:00 PM MDT	Benitez (yellow card) 25'; Cunningham 44'; Hernández (yellow card) 49'; Harris (red card); Avila 88'	Report	Espindola 5'; Williams (yellow card) 46'; Morales (yellow card) 49' (red card)	Stadium: Pizza Hut Park; Attendance: 11,003; Referee: Kevin Stott

November 6, 2010 Conf. Semifinals	Real Salt Lake	1–1 (2–3 agg.)	FC Dallas	Sandy, Utah
8:00 PM MDT	Olave (yellow card) 25'; Grabavoy (yellow card) 29'; Borchers (yellow card) 34'; Findley 79'	Report	McCarty 17'; Chávez (yellow card) 27'; Loyd (yellow card) 84'	Stadium: Rio Tinto Stadium; Attendance: 19,234; Referee: Jorge Gonzalez

== U.S. Open Cup ==
April 14, 2010	San Jose Earthquakes (California)	3–3 (aet) (3–5 p)	Real Salt Lake	Buck Shaw Stadium, Santa Clara
7:00 p.m. PT	Beitashour (yellow card) 51'; Leitch 68'; Álvarez 88'; Morrow 103'; Burling (yellow card) 109'	Report	Findley 7'; Johnson (yellow card) 8'; González 60'; Beckerman (yellow card) 89'; Borchers 118'	Attendance: 2,718; Referee: Alejandro Mariscal
	Penalties
	(penalty missed) Álvarez; (penalty scored) Gjertsen; (penalty scored) McDonald; (penalty scored) Sánchez		Johnson (penalty scored); Beckerman (penalty scored); Findley (penalty scored); Russell (penalty scored); Williams (penalty scored)

June 2, 2010	D.C. United (Washington, D.C.)	2–1 (a.e.t.)	Real Salt Lake	RFK Stadium, Washington, D.C.
7:30 p.m. ET	Luciano Emilio 75' (pen.); Morsink (yellow card) 92+'; Najar 107'; James (red card) 123+'	Report	Beltran (yellow card) 70'; Warner (yellow card) 73'; Alexandre (yellow card) 77'; Johnson 81' (pen.)	Attendance: 3,074; Referee: Mark Kadlecik

== CONCACAF Champions League ==
By winning the 2009 MLS Cup championship against Los Angeles, Real Salt Lake qualified directly into Group Stage for the 2010–11 edition of the CONCACAF Champions League. It was RSL's debut in the competition.

The draw for the group stage was held on May 19, 2010 in New York City. Salt Lake was paired with 2009 Panamanian champions Árabe Unido as well as the Mexican Professional League's, Cruz Azul and fellow MLS-opponent Toronto FC who qualified for the competition by winning the 2010 Canadian Championship.

Salt Lake's opening game took place on August 18, hosting Árabe Unido in which they won 2–1 thanks to a pair of goals from Álvaro Saborío. RSL would then head down to Mexico City's Estadio Azul to take on Cruz Azul for an August 25 match. During a part of the game, Salt Lake took a 3–1 lead over Cruz Azul, and look destined to become the first MLS club to defeat a Mexican team on Mexican soil in a meaningful competition. However, late goals from Cruz Azul's Javier Orozco gave Azul a 4–3 lead in the 89th minute. A stoppage time goal from Salt Lake's Will Johnson seemed to have savaged a point for RSL; however, a goal with less than twelve seconds remaining in stoppage time from Christian Giménez gave Cruz Azul the final goal to win 5–4.

The Royals would commence Champions League action again on September 15 hosting fellow league team, Toronto FC. In spite of an early goal from Macion Santos, RSL was able to rebound and score four unanswered goals, giving Salt Lake a 4–1 victory and a tie with Cruz Azul for first place in Group A. One week later, the Royals would travel to Panama City to take on Arabe Unido for their home fixture of pool play. Goals from Saborio and Johnson secured a 3–2 road victory for Salt Lake. With the victory, RSL became only the sixth MLS club to win a meaningful competition against a Central American opponent on their home turf. On September 28, Salt Lake qualified for the knockout stage of the tournament with a 1–1 draw against Toronto FC at BMO Field.

Tied with Cruz Azul with 3–1–1 records apiece, a victory would give Salt Lake first place in their group. Because of the late season push for the Supporters' Shield, Kries fielded primarily a second-tier squad against Cruz Azul. A record crowd came to Rio Tinto on October 19 to watch the group stage finale between the two sides. Goals from the recently acquired Paulo Araujo Jr. and from Collen Warner led to a 3–1 victory over the Cementeros. The win resulted in RSL winning Group A, as well as them becoming the first MLS club to win a Group in the CONCACAF Champions League.

On November 1, CONCACAF held the draw for the Championship Round at their headquarters in New York City. The round commenced during Salt Lake's 2011 season.

=== Group Standings ===
Team	Pld	W	D	L	GF	GA	GD	Pts
(United States) Real Salt Lake	6	4	1	1	17	11	+6	13
(Mexico) Cruz Azul	6	3	1	2	15	9	+6	10
(Canada) Toronto FC	6	2	2	2	5	7	−2	8
(Panama) Árabe Unido	6	1	0	5	4	14	−10	3

=== Results summary ===
Overall								Home						Away					
Pld	Pts	W	L	T	GF	GA	GD	W	L	T	GF	GA	GD	W	L	T	GF	GA	GD
6	13	4	1	1	17	11	+6	3	0	0	9	3	+6	1	1	1	8	8	0

Last updated: November 16, 2010
Source: CONCACAF
Pld = Matches played; Pts = Points; W = Matches won; T = Matches tied; L = Matches lost; GF = Goals for; GA = Goals against; GD = Goal difference

Round	1	2	3	4	5	6
Stadium	H	A	H	A	A	H
Result	W	L	W	W	T	W
Position	1	2	2	1	1	1

Updated to match(es) played on September 26, 2010. Source: MLS Results and League table
A = Away; H = Home; W = Win; L = Loss; T = Tie

=== Match results ===
August 18, 2010 Group Stage	Real Salt Lake	2–1	(Panama) Arabe Unido	Sandy, Utah
8:00 p.m. MT	Saborío 45'; Olave (yellow card) 48'; Williams (yellow card) 65'; Saborío 94+' (pen.); Wingert (yellow card) 97+'	Report	Cooper 13'; Carroll (red card) 29'; Rodríguez (yellow card) 51'; Cooper (yellow card) 52'; Calderón (yellow card) 71'; Justavino (yellow card) 86'; Caesar (yellow card) 92+'; Santamaría (yellow card) 93+' (yellow-red card) 95+'	Stadium: Rio Tinto Stadium; Referee: (Canada) Paul Ward

August 25, 2010 Group Stage	Cruz Azul (Mexico)	5–4	Real Salt Lake	Mexico City, Mexico
7:00 p.m. CT	Orozco 5', 75', 88', 89'; Biancucchi (yellow card) 18'; Cervantes (yellow card) 22'; Villa (yellow card) 91+'; Giménez 93+'	Report	Saborío 23' (pen.) 43'; González (yellow card) 27'; Espíndola 64'; Findley (yellow card) 87'; Johnson 92+'	Stadium: Estadio Azul; Attendance: 3,400; Referee: (Honduras) Oscar Moncada

September 15, 2010 Group Stage	Real Salt Lake	4–1	(Canada) Toronto FC	Sandy, Utah
8:00 p.m. MT	Beckerman 21'; Olave 40'; Beckerman (yellow card) 49'; Saborío 69' (pen.); Araujo 80'	Report	Santos 8'; Martin Šarić (yellow card) 44'	Stadium: Rio Tinto Stadium; Attendance: 11,579; Referee: (Mexico) Mauricio Morales

September 22, 2010 Group Stage	Arabe Unido (Panama)	2–3	Real Salt Lake	Colón, Colón, Panama
7:00 p.m. (UTC−5)	Aguilar 2'; Caroll (yellow card) 24'; Angulo 51' (pen.); De La Cruz (yellow card) 57'	Report	Johnson 10', 43'; Saborío 36'; González (yellow card) 76'; Espíndola (yellow card) 59' (red card) 87'	Stadium: Estadio Armando Dely Valdés; Referee: (Mexico) Benito Archundia

September 28, 2010 Group Stage	Toronto FC (Canada)	1–1	Real Salt Lake	Toronto, Ontario, Canada
8:00 p.m. ET	Peterson 19'; Usanov (yellow card) 52'		Warner (yellow card) 34'; Beckerman (yellow card) 60'; Morales 67'	Stadium: BMO Field; Referee: (Barbados) Trevor Taylor

October 19, 2010 Group Stage	Real Salt Lake	3–1	(Mexico) Cruz Azul	Sandy, Utah
8:00 p.m. MT	Warner (yellow card) 22'; Alexandre (yellow card) 35'; Araujo 43', 67'; Warner 69'	Report	Huiqui (yellow card) 64'; Villaluz 71'; Gimenez (yellow card) 90'	Stadium: Rio Tinto Stadium; Attendance: 20,463
