= Luis Gil (soccer) =

American soccer player (born 1993)

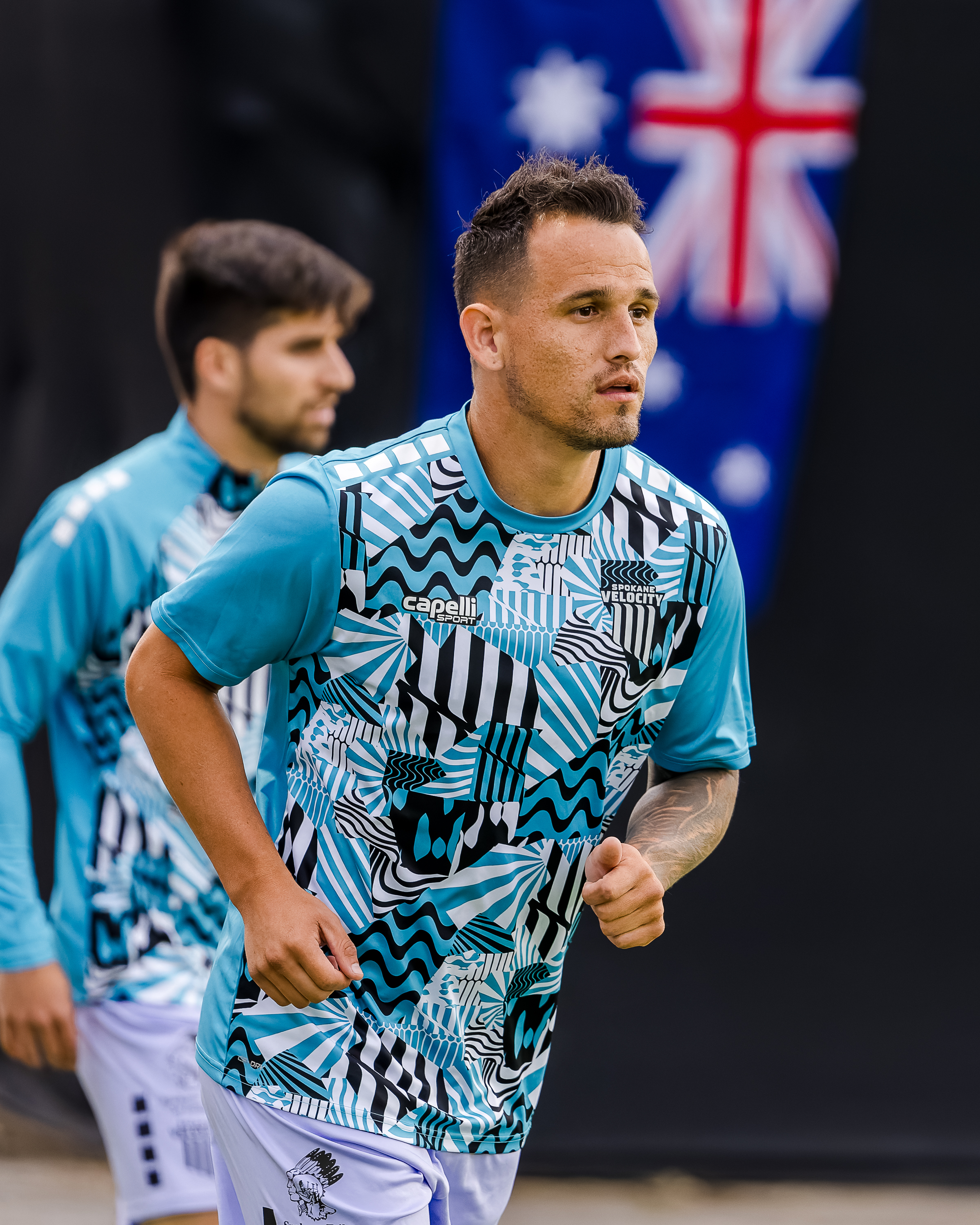
- Gill with Spokane Velocity in 2026

Personal information
- Full name: Luis Miguel Gil
- Date of birth: November 14, 1993 (age 32)
- Place of birth: Garden Grove, California, United States
- Height: 5 ft 9 in (1.75 m)
- Position: Midfielder

Team information
- Current team: Spokane Velocity

Youth career
- 2008–2009: IMG Soccer Academy

Senior career*
Years	Team	Apps	(Gls)
2010–2015	Real Salt Lake	134	(11)
2010	→ AC St. Louis (loan)	9	(1)
2016–2017	Querétaro	10	(0)
2017	→ Orlando City (loan)	17	(0)
2017	→ Colorado Rapids (loan)	4	(0)
2018	→ Houston Dynamo (loan)	12	(0)
2018	→ Rio Grande Valley (loan)	4	(0)
2019–2020	Viktoria Žižkov	17	(3)
2021	Táborsko	6	(0)
2022	Valley United	6	(1)
2022–2023	Union Omaha	49	(3)
2024–	Spokane Velocity	79	(18)

International career^{‡}
2008–2009	United States U17	32	(5)
2010–2011	United States U18	5	(1)
2011–2013	United States U20	13	(5)
2011–2016	United States U23	12	(3)
2014	United States	2	(0)
Medal record
Representing United States
Runner-up	CONCACAF U-20 Championship	2013
- * Club domestic league appearances and goals as of November 1, 2026 ‡ National team caps and goals as of May 21, 2016

Luis Miguel Gil (born November 14, 1993) is an American professional soccer player who plays for Spokane Velocity in USL League One.

== Youth ==
The son of Mexican immigrants, Luis Gil grew up in Garden Grove, California, where he started playing at the age of three. Gil attended U.S. Soccer Development Academy member IMG Soccer Academy in Bradenton, Florida in 2008 as a youth player.

== Career ==
=== Club ===
Gil turned professional when he signed a Generation Adidas contract with Major League Soccer in February 2010, spurning interest from major European clubs such as Premier League side Arsenal.

Having signed a GA deal after the MLS draft, Gil was placed in a weighted lottery to allocate him to an MLS club. The Kansas City Wizards won the rights to Gil despite the player having stated his preference before the lottery to play for a western-based club. MLS helped engineer Gil's trade to Real Salt Lake in exchange for an international roster slot, a second-round pick in the 2011 MLS SuperDraft, and 25 percent of any future transfer fee should RSL sell Gil outside of MLS. Gil made his professional debut as a substitute against D.C. United in the 2010 US Open Cup.

During the latter half of 2010, Gil joined AC St. Louis of the USSF Division 2 Professional League on loan. He made his debut for St. Louis on August 20 as a late substitute against the Puerto Rico Islanders, and scored his first professional goal on September 18, a 93rd-minute winner against the Austin Aztex.

On October 19, 2010, Gil made his RSL debut in a CONCACAF Champions League group match against Cruz Azul. He started the game and chipped a ball into the box to a teammate who was taken down for a penalty.

He made his MLS debut on March 26, 2011, coming on as a second-half substitute in RSL's 4–1 home win against Los Angeles Galaxy. He scored his first MLS goal on August 6, 2011, against New York Red Bulls.

In December 2015, Gil signed with Querétaro of Liga MX.

With playing time in Mexico limited, Gil was loaned to Orlando City for the 2017 season. His loan continued after an August trade to the Colorado Rapids.

On April 23, 2018, Gil again returned to MLS when he joined Houston Dynamo on loan. Gil made an appearance with the Dynamo USL affiliate, the Rio Grande Valley FC Toros, before making his Dynamo debut on May 11 in a 2–2 draw with the Vancouver Whitecaps. He helped the Dynamo win the 2018 US Open Cup, making three appearances and getting one assist in the tournament.

In July 2019, Gil signed a one-year deal with Czech National Football League side Viktoria Žižkov.

In March 2021, Gil signed a deal with Czech National Football League side FC MAS Táborsko.

Gil joined USL League One side Union Omaha on July 22, 2022.

Gil signed with USL League One expansion club Spokane Velocity on January 22, 2024.

=== International ===
Gil was born in the United States and is of Mexican descent. In 2009, Gil was a member of the United States U-17 national team for both the CONCACAF U-17 Championships and the FIFA U-17 World Cup.

Gil was named to the United States U-18 roster for the 2011 Milk Cup tournament in Northern Ireland.

Gil was included in the United States U-20 squad for the 2013 FIFA U-20 World Cup in Turkey, and scored a "spectacular" goal in a losing cause against Spain: "twisting and turning to work some space for himself 25 yards (23 m) from goal, [he] provided an early candidate for goal of the tournament with a stunning left-foot shot into the top right-hand corner."

He made his first appearance with the senior team on February 1, 2014, in a friendly against South Korea.

== Statistics ==
As of April 25, 2020

Club performance			League		Cup		League Cup		Continental		Total	
Season	Club	League	Apps	Goals	Apps	Goals	Apps	Goals	Apps	Goals	Apps	Goals
USA			League		Open Cup		MLS Cup		CONCACAF		Total	
2010	Real Salt Lake	Major League Soccer	0	0	–		0	0	1	0	1	0
2010	A.C. St. Louis (loan)	USSF D2 Pro League	9	1	2	0	–		–		11	1
2011	Real Salt Lake	Major League Soccer	25	2	2	0	3	0	–		30	2
2012	Real Salt Lake	Major League Soccer	29	1	1	1	1	0	2	0	33	2
2013	Real Salt Lake	Major League Soccer	30	5	1	0	5	0	–		36	6
2014	Real Salt Lake	Major League Soccer	26	2	1	0	2	0	–		29	2
2015	Real Salt Lake	Major League Soccer	24	1	3	0	–		2	0	29	1
Mexico			League		Copa MX		–		CONCACAF		Total	
2015–16	Querétaro	Liga MX	9	0	–		–		–		9	0
2016–17	Querétaro	Liga MX	1	0	4	0	–		–		5	0
USA			League		Open Cup		MLS Cup		CONCACAF		Total	
2017	Orlando City (loan)	MLS	17	0	1	0	–		–		18	0
2017	Colorado Rapids (loan)	MLS	4	0	–		–		–		4	0
2018	Houston Dynamo (loan)	MLS	12	0	3	0	–		–		15	0
2018	Rio Grande Valley FC (loan)	USL	4	0	–		–		–		4	0
Czech Republic			League		Czech Cup		—		UEFA		Total	
2019–20	FK Viktoria Žižkov	Czech National Football League	17	3	3	0	–		–		20	3
2020–21	FC MAS Táborsko	Czech National Football League	0	0	–		–		–		0	0
United States			180	12	14	1	11	0	5	0	210	12
Mexico			10	0	4	0	0	0	0	0	14	0
Czech Republic			17	3	3	0	0	0	0	0	20	3
Total			207	15	21	1	11	0	5	0	244	15

== Honors ==
Querétaro

- Copa MX: Apertura 2016

Houston Dynamo

- US Open Cup: 2018
