= Alex Titton =

Brazilian footballer (born 1990)

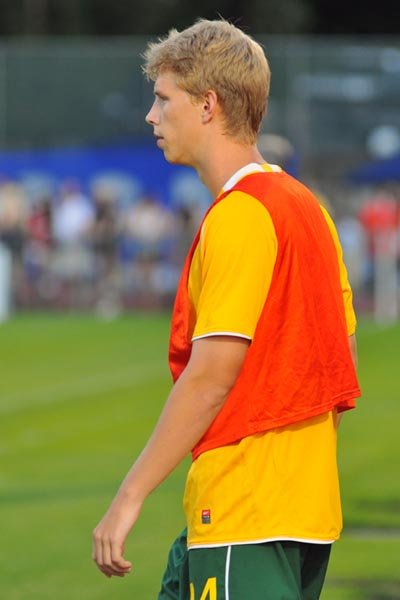

Personal information
- Full name: Alexandre Paaschen Titton
- Date of birth: September 25, 1990 (age 36)
- Place of birth: Porto Alegre, Brazil
- Height: 6 ft 2 in (1.88 m)
- Positions: Forward; attacking midfielder

Youth career
- 2002–2006: Grêmio
- 2007: Internacional

Senior career*
Years	Team	Apps	(Gls)
2008–2009	São José	1	(0)
2010–2011	AC St. Louis	12	(0)
2011	Nacional FC	0	(0)
2011	AGOVV Apeldoorn	0	(0)
2012	Horizonte	5	(1)
2012	Paulista	0	(0)
2013–2014	FC Solothurn	33	(12)
2014–2015	FC Tuggen	7	(0)
2015	Manaus	5	(0)
2017	FC Djursland		
- * Club domestic league appearances and goals as of November 17, 2014

Alex Paaschen Titton (born September 25, 1990) is a Brazilian footballer.

== Career ==
=== Brazil ===
Titton joined the youth academy of Brazilian club Grêmio, with whom he played for five seasons, before moving to the academy of their cross-town rivals, Internacional in 2007. He began his professional career in 2008 at São José of the Campeonato Brasileiro Série D, playing for two seasons for the club's reserves.

=== United States ===
While in England on a trial with Tottenham Hotspur, Titton met AC St. Louis head coach Claude Anelka, who invited him to try out with the USSF Division 2 Professional League expansion franchise. He signed with St. Louis in February 2010., and made his debut for the team on April 17, 2010, in a game against the Austin Aztex.

In August 2011 he signed at Dutch club AGOVV Apeldoorn but left the club within two months
