= Dale Schilly =

American soccer coach

Personal information
- Place of birth: St. Louis, Missouri, United States

Youth career
- Years: Team
- 1982: FIU Golden Panthers

Managerial career
- 1985–2010: Metro United
- 2010–2011: A.C. St Louis
- 2011–2015: St. Louis Scott Gallagher (Director)
- 2015–2016: Saint Louis FC
- 2023–Present: St. Louis City SC (Academy Director)

Dale Schilly (born in St. Louis, Missouri) is an American soccer coach.

He attended Rosary High School, which today is part of Trinity Catholic High School, and Florida International University.

In addition to his coaching duties, Schilly is also the director of the St. Louis Scott Gallagher-Illinois youth soccer organization. He holds a USSF "A" coaching license.

== Coaching career ==
=== AC St. Louis ===
On June 24, 2010, Schilly was named the new head coach of AC St. Louis, a team that had just begun playing that year in the USSF Division 2 Professional League. The club appointed Schilly after starting the season with a disappointing 2-7-1 record under outgoing coach Claude Anelka. Schilly's introduction improved the team's fortunes, leading them to a 5-8-7 record under his management. Despite this improvement, AC St. Louis ceased operation after the 2010 season due to financial issues.

=== Saint Louis FC ===
On May 1, 2014, USL PRO announced an expansion team in St. Louis for the 2015 season, named Saint Louis FC and owned by St. Louis Scott Gallagher. The team announced that Dale Schilly would be their first head coach.

=== St. Louis City SC ===
On January 4, 2023, Schilly was announced as the academy director for MLS team St. Louis City SC. Additionally, he serves as the color commentator for the team's radio broadcasts on local station KYKY.

== Achievements ==
=== Florida International University ===
- NCAA Men's Division II Soccer Championship Winner - 1982
