= John van Buskirk =

American soccer player and coach

Personal information
- Date of birth: April 13, 1972 (age 54)
- Place of birth: Granite City, Illinois, United States
- Height: 1.90 m (6 ft 3 in)
- Position: Striker

Youth career
- 1986–1990: Granite City High School
- 1990–1994: Indiana Hoosiers

Senior career*
Years	Team	Apps	(Gls)
1995–1999	KFC Uerdingen 05	60	(8)
1999	LR Ahlen	15	(4)
1999–2004	Sportfreunde Siegen	148	(48)
2004–2005	Rot-Weiß Erfurt	19	(1)
2005–2006	Kickers Emden	30	(2)
Total		272	(63)

Managerial career
- 2010: AC St. Louis (assistant)
- 2011–2012: UMSL (assistant)
- 2013–2016: McKendree University
- * Club domestic league appearances and goals

John van Buskirk (born April 13, 1972) is an American soccer coach and a former player.

== Playing career ==
Van Buskirk was a star player for his Granite City high school team, where he won two state championships, was chosen for the IHSA All-State team, was a Gatorade All-American, and served as team captain his senior year. After high school, John went to play for Indiana University. With Indiana, his team reached the #1 overall ranking in the country and played in a national championship.

He went on to play 12 years of professional soccer in Germany. He made appearances in Bundesliga, 2. Bundesliga, and German Regionalliga. Buskirk was the team captain of Sportfreunde Siegen in the 2. Bundesliga for three years. He made a total of 272 professional soccer appearances in Germany and scored 63 goals total.

== Coaching career ==
As a coach, Van Buskirk holds a Union of European Football Associations (UEFA) international C License. His professional coaching career includes Kickers Emden (2006–07) and he was an assistant coach for AC St. Louis until the team folded in 2010. John's college coaching career includes Men's head coach at Mckendree University (2013–2016) and an assistant coach at the University of Missouri-St. Louis (UMSL) from 2011 to 2013. Currently, he is the Director of Coaching and Player Development at Glen-Ed Soccer Club in Edwardsville, IL.
