= Jack Traynor (soccer) =

American soccer player

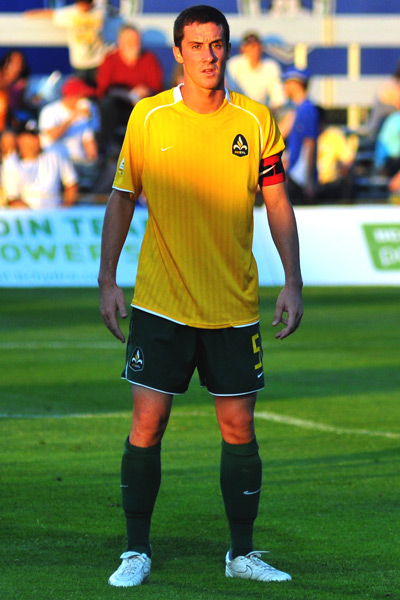

Personal information
- Full name: John Traynor
- Date of birth: March 17, 1987 (age 39)
- Place of birth: St. Charles, Missouri, United States
- Height: 5 ft 9 in (1.75 m)
- Position: Defender

College career
Years	Team	Apps	(Gls)
2005–2008	Notre Dame Fighting Irish		

Senior career*
Years	Team	Apps	(Gls)
2009	Miami FC	20	(0)
2010	AC St. Louis	26	(0)
2011	Orlando City	17	(0)
2012	Rochester Rhinos	14	(0)
Total		77	(0)
- * Club domestic league appearances and goals

John "Jack" Traynor (born March 17, 1987, in St. Charles, Missouri) is an American former soccer player.

== Career ==
=== College and amateur ===
Traynor attended Francis Howell North High School in St. Charles, Missouri and played college soccer at the University of Notre Dame, where he was named to the College Soccer News `100 Freshmen to Watch' list, and was named a Big East Academic All-Star as a junior.

=== Professional ===
Traynor was drafted in the second round (29th overall) of the 2009 MLS SuperDraft by the New York Red Bulls, but was not offered a contract by the team.

After an unsuccessful trial with Aalesunds FK in Norway, Traynor signed with Miami FC of the USL First Division. He made his professional debut on April 26, 2009, coming on as a substitute in Miami's game against Rochester Rhinos. On February 12, 2010, he signed with AC St. Louis

Following St. Louis folding after their one and only season in 2010, Traynor signed a multi-year contract with new USL Pro club Orlando City on March 15, 2011. Traynor spent only the 2011 season in Orlando, helping the club win the USL Pro championship, before signing with USL side Rochester Rhinos on November 28, 2011.

== Honors ==
=== Orlando City ===
- USL Pro (1): 2011
