= Elvir Kafedžić =

Bosnian footballer (born 1982)

Elvir "Fufi" Kafedžić
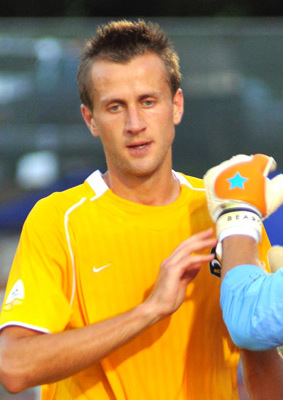

Personal information
- Date of birth: 19 December 1982 (age 43)
- Place of birth: Foča, Yugoslavia
- Height: 6 ft 2 in (1.88 m)
- Position: Forward

College career
Years	Team	Apps	(Gls)
2001–2005	Lindenwood Lions		

Senior career*
Years	Team	Apps	(Gls)
2004	St. Louis Strikers	9	(5)
2005–2006	St. Louis Steamers (indoor)	24	(8)
2006	Chicago Storm (indoor)	8	(1)
2006–2008	California Cougars (indoor)	16	(3)
2008–2010	St. Louis Illusion (indoor)	12	(36)
2010	AC St. Louis	14	(0)
2011–2012	Illinois Piasa (indoor)	19	(34)
2012–2013	Rockford Rampage (indoor)	6	(10)
2013–2016	St. Louis Ambush (indoor)	29	(22)

Managerial career
- 2022: St. Louis City 2 (assistant)
- 2023–2025: St Louis City SC (assistant)
- 2026–: St. Louis City 2 (assistant)
- * Club domestic league appearances and goals as of 23 January 2019

Elvir "Fufi" Kafedžić (born 19 December 1981) is a Bosnian-American footballer. He's currently an assistant manager of St. Louis City 2.

== Youth and college soccer ==
Kafedžić grew up in Bosnia and Herzegovina in the aftermath of the Bosnian War before his family immigrated to Berlin, Germany, in the early 1990s. In 1999, Kafedžić and his family moved to St. Louis, Missouri, where he attended Affton High School for one year. He subsequently played college soccer at Lindenwood University, where he was part of the Lions team that won the 2004 NAIA National Championship.

During his college years he also played with the St. Louis Strikers in the USL Premier Development League.

== Professional playing career ==
Kafedžić has extensive professional indoor soccer experience. He played with the St. Louis Steamers, Chicago Storm, and California Cougars and was a member of the US national futsal team that traveled to play in tournaments in Brazil and Spain in 2007.

Kafedžić signed his first professional outdoor contract in 2010 when he was signed by AC St. Louis of the USSF Division 2 Professional League.

== Coaching ==
In 2013, Kafedžić founded the St. Louis Dragons youth program. Kafedžić became a coach in the St. Louis City SC academy in 2021.
