= Nelson González (footballer) =

Argentine footballer

Personal information
- Full name: Nelson Ezequiel González
- Date of birth: September 22, 1988 (age 38)
- Place of birth: Berazategui, Buenos Aires, Argentina
- Height: 1.67 m (5 ft 6 in)
- Position: Midfielder

Team information
- Current team: Sportivo Patria

Senior career*
Years	Team	Apps	(Gls)
2008–2011	Quilmes	10	(0)
2010–2011	→ Real Salt Lake (loan)	18	(2)
2012–2013	Bella Vista	12	(0)
2013–2014	AEK Kouklia	17	(0)
2015–2016	Sport Loreto	48	(3)
2017–	Sportivo Patria	22	(3)
- * Club domestic league appearances and goals as of 3 June 2018

Nelson González (born September 22, 1988, in Berazategui, Buenos Aires), is an Argentine footballer who currently plays for Sportivo Patria in Argentina.

== Career ==
González began his professional career with Quilmes in 2008, making his debut on May 3, 2008, his only appearance of the team's 2007/08 season. He played nine games for El Cervecero in their 2008/09 campaign before making a move on loan to Major League Soccer side Real Salt Lake in July, 2009.

González remained with Real Salt Lake through the 2011 season. At season's end, the club declined his 2012 contract option and he entered the 2011 MLS Re-Entry Draft. He was not selected in the draft and became a free agent in MLS.

In August 2012, he signed a new contract with Uruguayan side C.A. Bella Vista.

On 29 June 2013, he signed a contract with Cypriot side AEK Kouklia.
