= Tim Velten =

American soccer player

Personal information
- Full name: Timothy Velten
- Date of birth: September 1, 1983 (age 43)
- Place of birth: St. Louis, Missouri, United States
- Height: 6 ft 0 in (1.83 m)
- Position: Defender

College career
Years	Team	Apps	(Gls)
2002–2003	SIU Edwardsville Cougars		
2004–2005	Louisville Cardinals		

Senior career*
Years	Team	Apps	(Gls)
2007	Harrisburg City Islanders	23	(1)
2008	Charleston Battery	26	(0)
2009	Harrisburg City Islanders	20	(0)
2009	→ Rochester Rhinos (loan)	4	(0)
2010	AC St. Louis	24	(0)
- * Club domestic league appearances and goals as of October 2, 2010

Tim Velten (born September 1, 1983, in St. Louis, Missouri) is an American soccer player, last playing for AC St. Louis in the USSF Division 2 Professional League.

== Career ==
=== College ===
Velten attended Webster Groves High School where he was a second team All State soccer player as a senior. He played two years of college soccer at Southern Illinois University Edwardsville, where he started all 39 games of his freshman and sophomore seasons and was named the Great Lakes Valley Conference Co-Freshman of the Year in 2001, and a First Team All-Conference, First Team All-Region, and Third Team All-American his sophomore year before transferring to the University of Louisville as a junior. At Louisville he started 34 games over the course of 2004 and 2005, and was named Co-Most Valuable Player and Defensive Most Valuable Player by his teammates in 2004.

=== Professional ===
Velten turned professional in 2007 when he joined the Harrisburg City Islanders in the USL Second Division, and was part of the USL-2 championship-winning team in his debut season. On July 16, 2007, the Baltimore Blast of Major Indoor Soccer League selected Velten in the 8th round of the MISL Supplemental Draft, but he did not sign with the team.

On April 8, 2008, Velten signed with the Charleston Battery in the USL First Division., and played 26 games for the Battery before returning to Harrisburg in 2009. On February 9, 2010, he signed with the new founded club AC St. Louis.
