= Chris Salvaggione =

American soccer player (born 1987)

Personal information
- Full name: Chris Salvaggione
- Date of birth: April 7, 1987 (age 39)
- Place of birth: Monument, Colorado, United States
- Height: 5 ft 10 in (1.78 m)
- Positions: Midfielder; forward

Team information
- Current team: Real Colorado Foxes

Youth career
- 2005–2006: Gardner–Webb Runnin' Bulldogs
- 2007–2008: Charlotte 49ers

Senior career*
Years	Team	Apps	(Gls)
2006	Colorado Springs Blizzard	14	(3)
2007	DFW Tornados	10	(0)
2008	Austin Aztex U23	4	(0)
2009	Real Colorado Foxes	13	(7)
2010	AC St. Louis	19	(3)
2011–2012	Charlotte Eagles	40	(4)
2013	Real Colorado Foxes	0	(0)
2015–	Harpo's FC	0	(0)
- * Club domestic league appearances and goals as of July 15, 2012

Chris Salvaggione (born April 7, 1987) is an American soccer player who currently plays for Real Colorado Foxes in the USL Premier Development League.

== Career ==
=== College and amateur ===
Salvaggione attended Lewis-Palmer High School, helped his junior club side Colorado Rush to a US Club Soccer national championship, and began his college soccer career at Gardner–Webb University, transferring to the University of North Carolina at Charlotte as a junior in 2007. He helped his Gardner-Webb team win the 2006 Atlantic Sun Championship and reach the second round of the NCAA Tournament, while at UNC Charlotte he was named to the All-Atlantic 10 First Team and the NSCAA/Adidas All-Mid-Atlantic second team as a junior, and was the A-10 Offensive Player of the Year, an NSCAA Second Team All-American, and a Hermann Trophy semi-finalist as a senior.

During his college years Salvaggione also played extensively in the USL Premier Development League, featuring for Colorado Springs Blizzard, the DFW Tornados and Austin Aztex U23.

=== Professional ===
Salvaggione was drafted in the third round (38th overall) of the 2009 MLS SuperDraft by New England Revolution, but was not offered a contract by the Major League Soccer side.

After spending another year in the PDL in 2009, with the Real Colorado Foxes, playing reserve matches with the Colorado Rapids, and trialing unsuccessfully with Charleston Battery, Chivas USA and in Germany with FC Saarbrucken, FSV Frankfurt and KSV Klein-Karben, Salvaggione signed his first professional contract on February 11, 2010, for AC St. Louis. He made his professional debut on May 1, 2010, in a game against Crystal Palace Baltimore.

After the demise of AC St. Louis, Salvaggione signed with Charlotte Eagles of the third division USL Pro league on February 25, 2011.
