= Gauchinho (footballer, born 1983) =

Brazilian footballer

Personal information
- Full name: Jéferson Lima de Menezes
- Date of birth: 11 February 1983 (age 43)
- Place of birth: Santana do Livramento, Brazil
- Height: 1.70 m (5 ft 7 in)
- Positions: Attacking midfielder; right winger

Senior career*
Years	Team	Apps	(Gls)
2002–2005	Flamengo	20	(0)
2004	→ Remo (loan)	0	(0)
2006–2009	Næstved	87	(15)
2010	AC St. Louis	20	(2)
2011	São José-PA	0	(0)
2011	SE Patrocinense		
- * Club domestic league appearances and goals

Jéferson Lima de Menezes (born 11 February 1983), commonly known as Gauchinho, is a Brazilian former footballer.

== Career ==
Gauchinho started his professional career in 2002 at Brazilian giants Flamengo, making his debut in the Campeonato Brasileiro on 20 July 2003 against Criciúma. He played 20 Série A games and 3 Cup games for Flamengo, and spent a brief period on loan with Remo, before moving to Denmark in 2006.

He subsequently spent four years playing with Næstved in the Danish 1st Division, before signing with AC St. Louis of the USSF Division 2 Professional League in February, 2010.
