= Brad Stisser =

American soccer player

Personal information
- Full name: Brad Scott Stisser
- Date of birth: September 24, 1986 (age 40)
- Place of birth: Livermore, California, United States
- Height: 5 ft 10 in (1.78 m)
- Positions: Winger; forward

Youth career
- 2005: Coastal Carolina Chanticleers
- 2006–2008: Loyola Marymount Lions

Senior career*
Years	Team	Apps	(Gls)
2007–2008	Colorado Rapids U-23	23	(3)
2009	Real Colorado Foxes	8	(3)
2010	AC St. Louis	24	(5)
2011	Rochester Rhinos	3	(0)
2012	Charlotte Eagles	9	(0)
2013	Atlanta Silverbacks	14	(2)
2014–2015	Arizona United	34	(3)
- * Club domestic league appearances and goals as of January 8, 2016

Brad Stisser (born September 24, 1986) is a retired American soccer player.

== Career ==
=== College and amateur ===
Stisser grew up in Highlands Ranch, Colorado, and attended Highlands Ranch High School, where he captained his team in his senior season, and was named to the Colorado All-State 5A First Team, the Colorado High School Coaches Association Second Team, and the Colorado Second Team All-State squad. He began his college soccer career at Coastal Carolina University before transferring to Loyola Marymount University as a sophomore in 2006.

During his college years Stisser also played with Colorado Rapids U23's and the Real Colorado Foxes in the USL Premier Development League, and was named to the PDL All-Western Conference Team in 2009.

=== Professional ===
Stisser signed his first professional contract in 2010 when he was signed by AC St. Louis of the USSF Division 2 Professional League. He made his professional debut on April 17, 2010, in a game against the Austin Aztex, and scored his first professional goal on June 12, 2010, in a game against the Puerto Rico Islanders.

Following the demise of AC St. Louis, Stisser signed with Rochester Rhinos of the USL Pro league on February 22, 2011.

== Personal ==
Brad stems from a soccer family. His father, Scott, is former college player for San Jose State Spartans and his mother, Barbara, played for Chico State Wildcats
