= Hagop Chirishian =

American soccer player (born 1989)

Personal information
- Full name: Hagop Chirishian
- Date of birth: November 1, 1989 (age 36)
- Place of birth: Hollywood, California, United States
- Height: 5 ft 6 in (1.68 m)
- Position: Attacking midfielder

Youth career
- 2005–2009: Pasadena Lancers

Senior career*
Years	Team	Apps	(Gls)
2007–2009	Ventura County Fusion	36	(9)
2010	AC St. Louis	6	(0)
2012	Wilmington Hammerheads	11	(1)
2013	Ventura County Fusion	1	(7)
2013–2015	New York Cosmos	23	(2)
- * Club domestic league appearances and goals as of July 19, 2015

Hagop Chirishian (born November 1, 1989, in Hollywood, California) is a professional American soccer player who currently a free agent. He last played for New York Cosmos in the North American Soccer League.

== Career ==
=== Youth and amateur ===
Chirishian, who is of Armenian heritage, attended the AGBU Manoogian-Demirdjian School, and played college soccer at Pasadena City College, where he was a team-mate of fellow Armenian-American soccer players Yura Movsisyan and Gilbert Pogosyan.

During his college years Chirishian played for Ventura County Fusion in the USL Premier Development League, helping them to the PDL championship in 2009. He also played for many LA-area amateur teams, including Santa Anita SC, Rampage Soccer Club, and FC Pyunik LA.

=== Professional ===
Chirishian trialed with Major League Soccer side Real Salt Lake in 2008 but was not offered a contract by the team. He signed his first professional contract in 2010 when he was signed by AC St. Louis of the USSF Division 2 Professional League. He made his professional debut on April 22, 2010, in a game against Portland Timbers.

Chirishian did not play professionally in 2011. He signed with Wilmington Hammerheads of the USL Pro league in February 2012. He signed with his former team Ventura County Fusion in 2013 and later scored in his second debut match for the team.

Chirishian then signed with the New York Cosmos before the 2013 NASL Fall Season. He made his Cosmos debut with a start on November 24, 2013, playing 64 minutes against the San Antonio Scorpions. Chirishian appeared in seven games and saw 353 minutes of action in the 2013 season. The Cosmos resigned Chirishian for the 2014 NASL season in December 2013.

Chirishian scored his first goal for the Cosmos on May 28, 2014, in a 2–0 win over the Brooklyn Italians in the 2014 Lamar Hunt U.S. Open Cup.

Chirishian scored his first NASL goal for the Cosmos on October 11, 2014, netting the game-winning goal in second half stoppage time to lift the Cosmos to a 2–1 victory over Ottawa Fury FC.

Chirishian scored again just two weeks later on October 25, 2014, in a 2–2 draw against the Tampa Bay Rowdies.

Chirishian finished the 2014 season with two goals and one assist in 14 games and five starts for the Cosmos. Chirishian played in the last six consecutive games of the season for the Cosmos.

== Honors ==
=== Ventura County Fusion ===
- USL Premier Development League Champions (1): 2009

=== New York Cosmos ===
- North American Soccer League Champions (1): 2013
