= Alec Dufty =

American soccer player

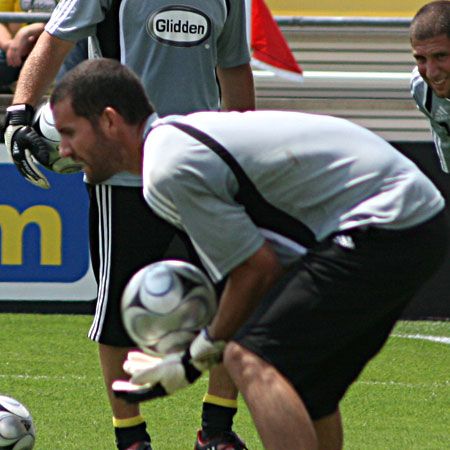

Personal information
- Full name: Alec Dufty
- Date of birth: March 11, 1987 (age 39)
- Place of birth: Binghamton, New York, U.S.
- Height: 6 ft 5 in (1.96 m)
- Position: Goalkeeper

Youth career
- 2005: Appalachian State Mountaineers
- 2006–2008: Evansville Purple Aces

Senior career*
Years	Team	Apps	(Gls)
2006	Raleigh Elite	6	(0)
2009	New York Red Bulls	1	(0)
2010	AC St. Louis	30	(0)
2010	→ Chicago Fire (loan)	0	(0)
2011–2012	Chicago Fire	0	(0)

Managerial career
- 2012–2013: UIC Flames (Assistant coach)
- 2013–2014: Florida Gulf Coast Eagles (Assistant coach)
- 2015: Toronto FC II (Assistant coach)
- 2016–: Swope Park Rangers (Goalkeeper coach)
- * Club domestic league appearances and goals

Alec Dufty (born March 11, 1987) is an American former soccer player and current coach. He is currently a goalkeeper coach with Sporting Kansas City in Major League Soccer.

== Career ==
=== College and amateur career ===
Dufty grew up in Raleigh, North Carolina. His father, David Dufty, was a third round draft pick (48th overall) of the San Jose Earthquakes in the 1975 NASL draft. The 6'6" David Dufty played four years at Colgate University and would have been the tallest player in the NASL, but was not signed by the Earthquakes. Alec Dufty played college soccer at Appalachian State University and the University of Evansville, where he was an All-Missouri Valley Conference selection in his final two years.

During his college years Dufty also played with Raleigh Elite in the USL Premier Development League.

=== Professional career ===
Dufty was signed by New York Red Bulls on 12 March 2009, and made his MLS debut on 11 April 2009 as a substitute for Danny Cepero in the eighth minute of a Major League Soccer match against Houston Dynamo at Robertson Stadium. Dufty did not concede a goal as New York held Houston to a scoreless draw. However, despite a strong display, he was waived by the club only three days later.

After being released, Dufty signed a contract to become part of the Major League Soccer League-Wide Reserve Goalkeeper Pool. In May 2009 he was called up by Columbus Crew to provide cover for Andy Gruenebaum while Will Hesmer was injured. On 27 February 2010 signed for newly founded USSF D2 Pro League club AC St. Louis.

On March 1, 2011, Dufty signed a contract with Chicago Fire of Major League Soccer. At the season's end his 2012 contract option was declined by Chicago and he entered the 2011 MLS Re-Entry Draft. Dufty was not selected in the draft and became a free agent.

=== International ===
Dufty was called up to the United States U-20 men's national soccer team for a friendly versus Argentina in May 2007. Dufty did not play, though, as Argentina won 1–0 in front of 3,531 people at PAETEC Park in Rochester, New York.

== Statistics ==
Club performance			League		Cup		League Cup		Continental		Total	
Season	Club	League	Apps	Goals	Apps	Goals	Apps	Goals	Apps	Goals	Apps	Goals
USA			League		Open Cup		League Cup		North America		Total	
2009	New York Red Bulls	MLS	1	0	0	0	0	0	0	0	1	0
Total	USA		1	0	0	0	0	0	0	0	1	0
Career total			1	0	0	0	0	0	0	0	1	0
