= Gilbert Pogosyan =

Armenian footballer

Personal information
- Full name: Gilbert Pogosyan
- Date of birth: 1 November 1988 (age 37)
- Place of birth: Armenian SSR, Soviet Union
- Height: 1.80 m (5 ft 11 in)
- Position: Midfielder

College career
Years	Team	Apps	(Gls)
2007–2009	Pasadena Lancers		

Senior career*
Years	Team	Apps	(Gls)
2010	AC St. Louis	2	(0)
- * Club domestic league appearances and goals as of 29 August 2011

Gilbert Pogosyan (born 1 November 1988 in Artashat) is an Armenian retired professional footballer.

== Youth and amateur ==
Pogosyan grew up in Verdugo City, California in the United States, and played college soccer at Pasadena City College, where he was a team-mate of fellow Armenian soccer player Hagop Chirishian.

== Professional ==
Pogosyan signed his first professional contract in 2010 when he was signed by AC St. Louis of the USSF Division 2 Professional League. He made his professional debut on 22 April 2010 in a game against Portland Timbers.

== International ==
Pogosyan has played soccer twice at the Pan-Armenian Games in 2007 and 2009, representing the Armenian American community.
