= Mark Bloom =

American soccer player (born 1987)

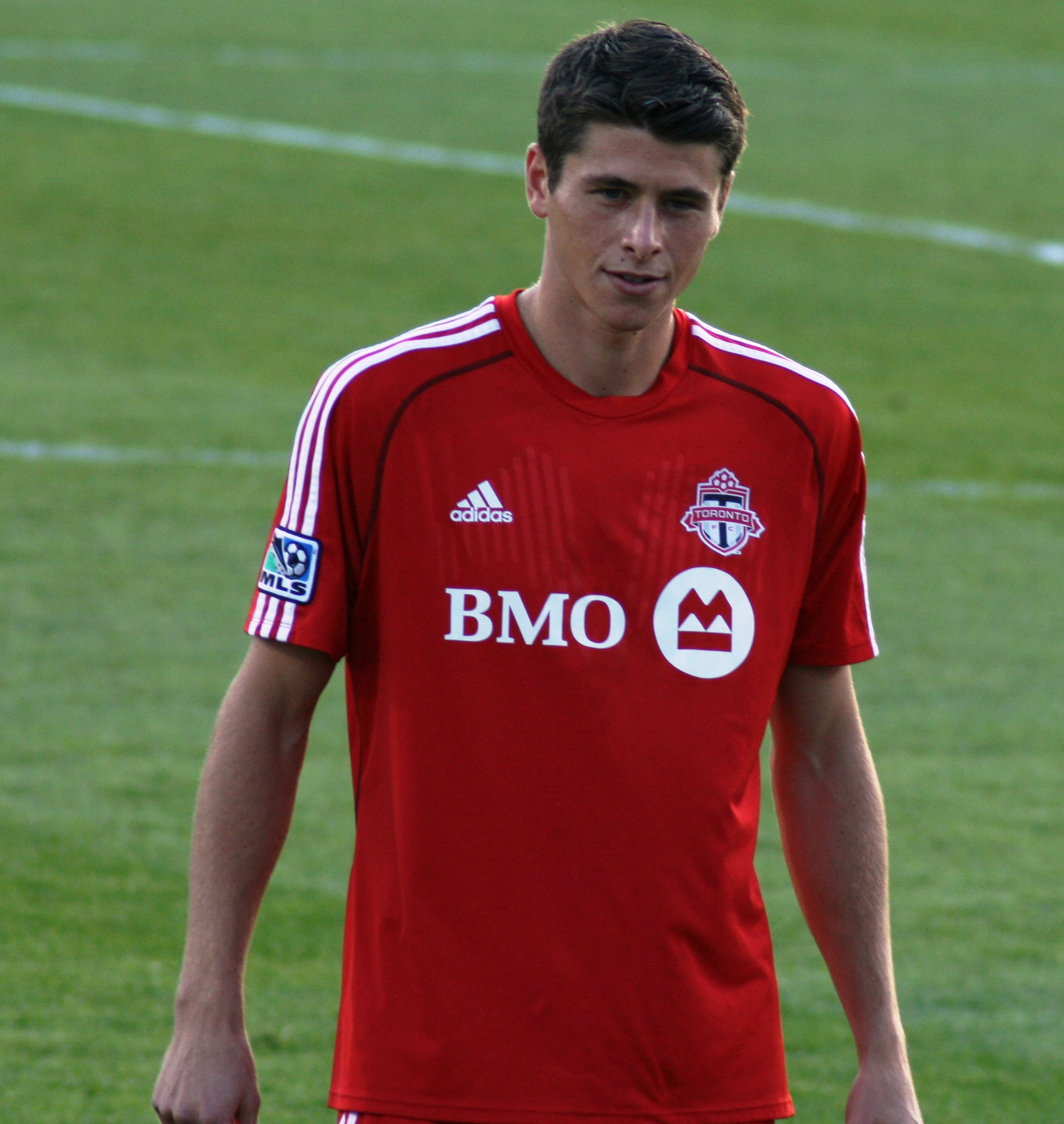
- Bloom in 2013

Personal information
- Full name: Mark Bloom
- Date of birth: November 25, 1987 (age 38)
- Place of birth: Marietta, Georgia, U.S.
- Height: 6 ft 0 in (1.83 m)
- Position: Full-back

Youth career
- 2006–2009: Berry Vikings

Senior career*
Years	Team	Apps	(Gls)
2008	Atlanta Silverbacks U23's	7	(0)
2009	Southern California Seahorses	10	(1)
2010	AC St. Louis	29	(1)
2011–2012	Charlotte Eagles	44	(1)
2013	Atlanta Silverbacks	12	(0)
2013	→ Toronto FC (loan)	6	(0)
2014–2016	Toronto FC	33	(0)
2016	→ Toronto FC II (loan)	2	(0)
2017	Atlanta United	2	(0)
Total		145	(3)
- * Club domestic league appearances and goals as of 17:05, 26 October 2017 (UTC)

Mark Bloom (born November 25, 1987) is an American retired soccer player. Bloom played as a defender.

== Career ==
=== Youth and amateur ===
Born in Marietta, Georgia, Bloom played college soccer at Berry College, where he was a second-team All-Southern States Athletic Conference selection as a junior in 2008, and was his team's MVP in his senior year in 2009. During his time with Berry he helped the school to a 48-26-5 record, two conference titles, and scored 13 goals.

During his college years Bloom also played in the USL Premier Development League both in the Atlanta Silverbacks U23's and the Southern California Seahorses.

=== Professional ===
Bloom signed his first professional contract in 2010 when he was signed by AC St. Louis of the USSF Division 2 Professional League. He made his professional debut on April 10, 2010, in St. Louis's first ever game, against Carolina RailHawks Bloom joined Charlotte Eagles of the USL Pro league for the 2011 season.

In 2013, Bloom joined the Atlanta Silverbacks of the NASL. He was loaned to Toronto FC on July 12, 2013. He made his Major League Soccer debut on September 14, 2013, playing a full 90 minutes in an away loss to New York Red Bulls. Bloom's loan option was exercised by Toronto FC, making a permanent move to the club the following season. On January 13, 2015, it was announced that he re-signed with the team on a multi-year deal.

On March 25, 2016, Bloom was loaned to affiliate club Toronto FC II. He made his debut the following day in a 2–2 draw with New York Red Bulls II.

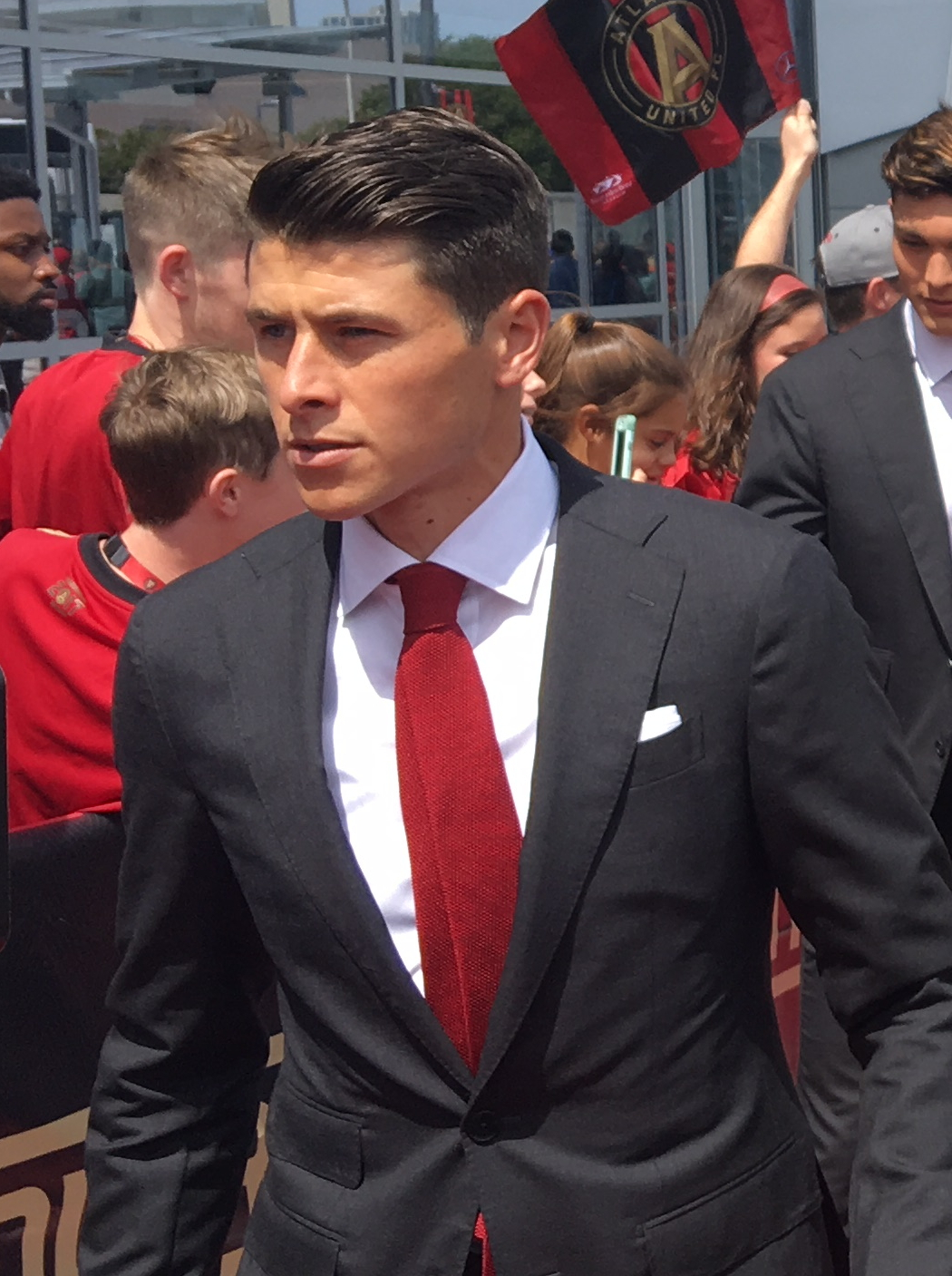
Mark Bloom after signing the Golden Spike for Atlanta United on September 10, 2017

On December 13, 2016, he was traded to Atlanta United for Clint Irwin who was selected by Atlanta United FC in the third round of the 2016 MLS Expansion Draft.

As of December 2017, Bloom had his contract option with Atlanta United declined. He subsequently retired from professional football to work as a financial advisor.
