= AC St. Louis =

Defunct soccer club in St. Louis, Missouri

- Full name: Athletic Club of St. Louis
- Founded: 2009
- Dissolved: 2011; 15 years ago
- Ground: Anheuser-Busch Soccer Park; Fenton, Missouri
- Capacity: 6,000
- Owner: Jeff Cooper
- Head Coach: Dale Schilly
- League: USSF Division 2 Professional League
- 2010: Regular season: 5th, NASL; Overall: 11th Playoffs: DNQ
- Website: ac-stlouis.com
Home colors	Away colors	Third colors

AC St. Louis was an American professional soccer team based in St. Louis, Missouri, United States. Founded in December 2009, the team played its first and only season the next year in the NASL Conference of the temporary USSF D2 Pro League, the second tier of the American Soccer Pyramid. With plans to join the new North American Soccer League the following season, the club folded in January 2011 under unmanageable financial strain.

St. Louis played its home games at the Anheuser-Busch Soccer Park in nearby Fenton, Missouri. The team's colors were green, white, and yellow. St. Louis was first coached by Claude Anelka, the older brother of French international striker Nicolas Anelka; however, he was replaced by Dale Schilly midway through the club's only season.

The men's team was one of three parts of the sports club owned by St. Louis-native Jeff Cooper. Saint Louis Athletica of Women's Professional Soccer, folding in 2010, and a large youth soccer league throughout the metropolitan area were the other components of AC St. Louis.

== History ==
The origins of A.C. St. Louis lie in Jeff Cooper's bid to land a Major League Soccer expansion team. With his investment group St. Louis Soccer United (SLSU), Cooper twice attempted to bring MLS to the St. Louis metropolitan area only to have both bids turned down in favor of other cities in 2008 and 2009. Despite approved stadium plans to build the Collinsville Soccer Complex in suburban Collinsville, Illinois, MLS was not impressed with the bid's financial backing and suggested Cooper expand his group of investors. As the price of the expansion fee rose, Cooper refocused his efforts to building a second division club.

=== USSF D2 Pro League ===
This involved Cooper selling a majority interest to investors in the fall of 2009. By November SLSU changed its name to the Athletic Club of St. Louis with their new men's team AC St. Louis. Also announced was their intent to become co-founders of the new North American Soccer League formed from teams breaking away from the established United Soccer Leagues. After filed lawsuits and heated press statements between the two conflicting leagues, the USSF declared neither league would be sanctioned for the coming year, and ordered both to work together on a plan to temporarily allow their teams to play a 2010 season. On January 7, 2010, the interim solution was announced to be the new USSF D2 Professional League comprising clubs from both USL and NASL.

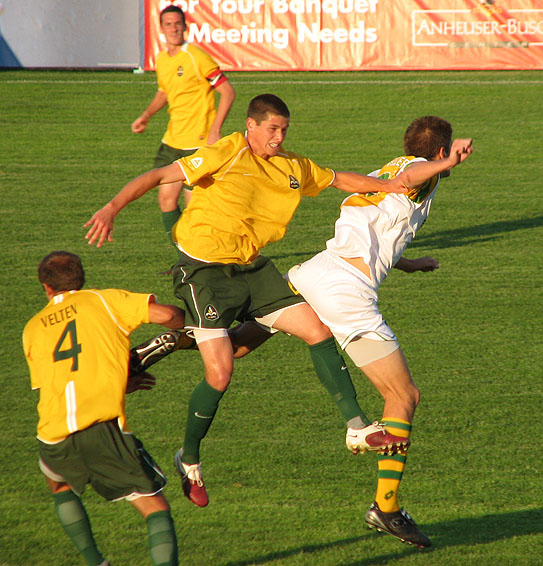
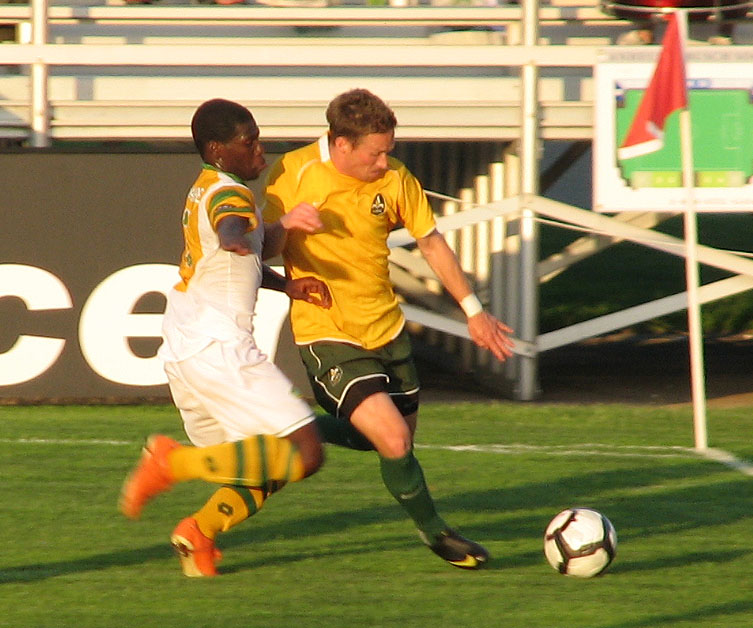
AC St. Louis (in gold jerseys) playing v the Tampa Bay Rowdies in 2010

In February 2010, AC St. Louis announced that Steve Ralston – MLS career leader in games played, minutes played, and assists – would become the first player ever to officially sign with the club. The rest of the roster was primarily filled out with lower division signees and former college players.

After a successful launch in April, the club fell into financial trouble by May 2010 when the investors pulled out of funding both AC St. Louis and St. Louis Athletica. Despite Cooper resuming financial control of the teams, Athletica was unable to be saved. Other cost-cutting measures included selling Ralston's contract back to the New England Revolution and negotiating contract buyouts of players who did not reside in the St. Louis area. AC St. Louis finished the season second to last in both their conference and league.

During the following off season, Cooper sought to sell the club to keep it financially afloat. However, despite his best efforts to secure the long-term future of the club, AC St. Louis folded in January 2011.

== Colors and badge ==
The inverted shield features a fleur-de-lis with a golden flame beneath a catenary arch. The fleur-de-lis, a long time symbol of the city featured heavily in the region's iconography, was a symbol of French monarchs including Louis IX of France, for whom the city is named. The flame alludes to the 1904 Summer Olympics which were held in St. Louis as part of the St. Louis World's Fair, and is seen by many St. Louisans to be one of the formative events in the city's history. The arch represents the Gateway Arch, which was built in 1965 as a memorial to the city's placement in American history as the "Gateway to the West." A.C. is an homage to the Missouri Athletic Club, which has promoted soccer in the region for more than 100 years.

On February 11, 2010 the team announced it had entered into an agreement with Nike upon a multi-year apparel and footwear sponsorship. The team's color scheme was green, gold, and white.

== Stadium ==
- Anheuser-Busch Soccer Park; Fenton, Missouri (2010)

== Club culture ==
=== Supporters ===
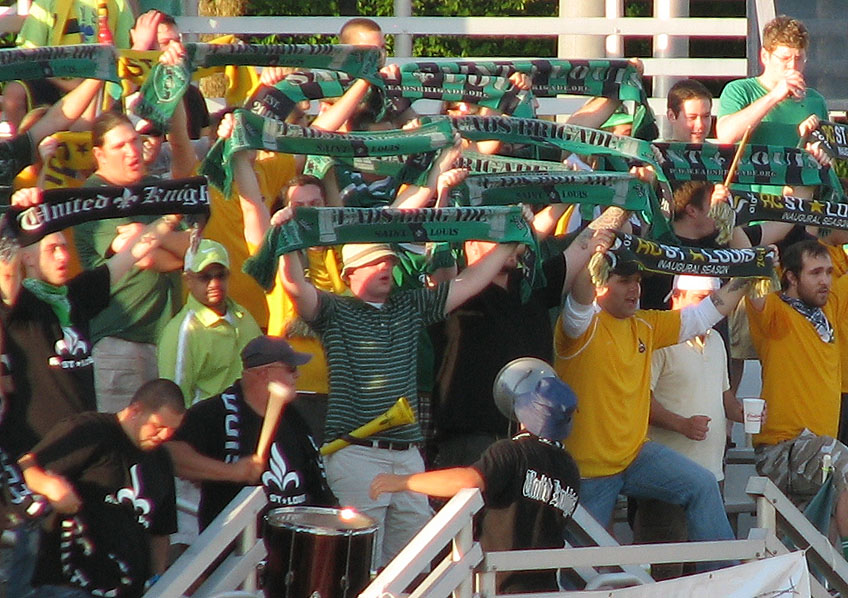
AC St. Louis supporters

The St. Louligans grew out of the multiple supporters groups already established in the St. Louis and surrounding areas. The fans united under this one banner while also keeping their individual identities as groups alive. They comprised the "Seven Nation Army" of the St. Louligans supporters movement, with those being Chickenhead, Day Pints Club, Eads Brigade, Henry Shaw Collective, Laclede's Army, River City Saints and United Knights.

== Players and staff ==
=== Final roster ===
This list is a historical record of the final group of players on the last ACSTL roster for their final game in 2010. Source:

Note: Flags indicate national team as defined under FIFA eligibility rules; some limited exceptions apply. Players may hold more than one non-FIFA nationality.

No.	Pos.	Nation	Player
1	GK	USA	Alec Dufty
2	DF	USA	Zach Bauer
3	MF	USA	Troy Cole
4	DF	USA	Tim Velten
5	DF	USA	Jack Traynor
6	DF	USA	John Lesko
7	MF	USA	Luke Kreamalmeyer
8	DF	TRI	Anthony O'Garro
9	FW	BIH	Elvir Kafedžić
10	MF	USA	Hagop Chirishian
11	MF	USA	Chris Salvaggione

No.	Pos.	Nation	Player
12	MF	ARM	Gilbert Pogosyan
13	MF	BRA	Gauchinho
15	FW	USA	Mike Ambersley
17	MF	USA	Brad Stisser
20	MF	USA	Jeff Cosgriff
21	DF	USA	Mark Bloom
22	GK	USA	Chad Becker
23	MF	USA	Ryan Moore
24	FW	BRA	Alex Titton
26	DF	USA	Dillon Barna
31	MF	USA	Michael Videira

=== Staff ===
- (United States) Dale Schilly Head Coach
- (United States) John van Buskirk Assistant Coach
- (United States) Tim Leonard Assistant Coach
- (United States) Blake Decker Assistant Coach
- (United States) Tim Owens General Manager
- (United States) Paul Rogers Goalkeeper Coach

=== Notable former players ===
This (incomplete) list of former players includes those who received international caps while playing for the team, made significant contributions to the team in terms of appearances or goals while playing for the team, or who made significant contributions to the sport either before they played for the team, or after they left.

- (United States) Steve Ralston (2010)
- (United States) Luis Gil (2010)

=== Head coaches ===
- (France) Claude Anelka (2009–2010)
- (United States) Dale Schilly (2010)

== Record ==
=== Year-by-year ===
Year	Division	League	Regular season	Playoffs	Open Cup	Avg. attendance
2010	2	USSF Division 2	5th, NASL (11th)	Did not qualify	3rd Round	2,750

== See also ==
- Soccer in St. Louis
