= Claude Anelka =

French football manager (born 1968)

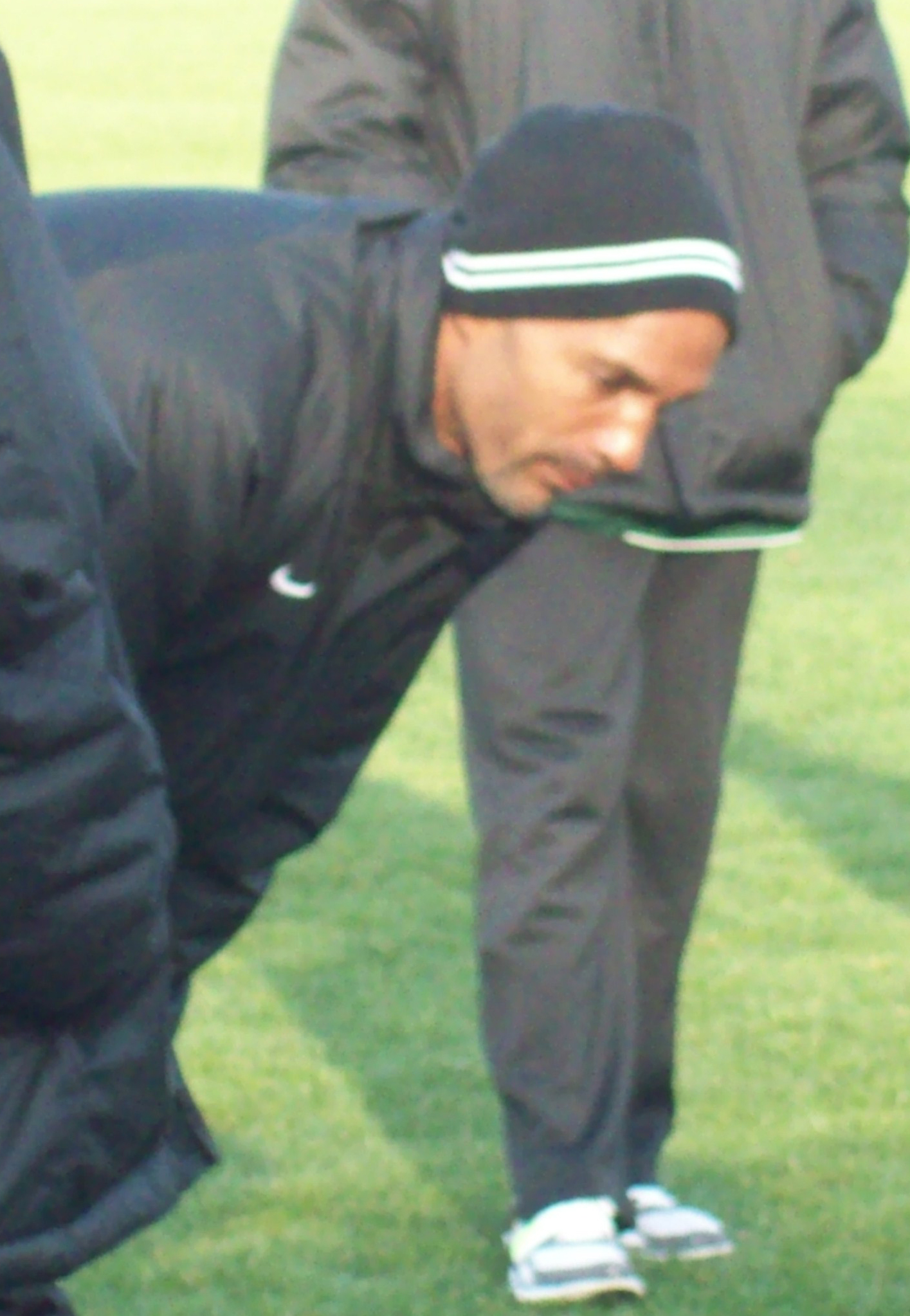
- Anelka in 2010 as manager of AC St Louis

Personal information
- Date of birth: 12 March 1968 (age 58)
- Place of birth: Saint-Pierre, Martinique

Team information
- Current team: Little Haiti FC (Director of Coaching)

Senior career*
Years	Team	Apps	(Gls)
1986–1988	Versailles		
1989–1994	Paris FC		
1994–1997	Choisy-le-Roi		

Managerial career
- 2004: Raith Rovers
- 2009–2010: AC St. Louis
- * Club domestic league appearances and goals

Claude Anelka (born 12 March 1968) is a French football manager, who is the Director of Coaching at Little Haiti FC, and former player.

== Early life ==
Anelka was born in Saint-Pierre, Martinique on 12 March 1968.

== Playing career ==
Anelka played as a defender for Versailles, Paris FC and Choisy-le-Roi.

== Managerial career ==
In 2004, he invested approximately £300,000 into Scottish side Raith Rovers and became manager. However, he resigned as manager in September 2004 after managing just one draw and seven defeats from eight games. After resigning as manager, he became Director of Football, but resigned from that position in October 2004.

Anelka, after leaving Raith, worked as a coach at FC Trappes, where both his brother and Patrick Vieira began their careers.

On 8 December 2009, Anelka was announced as the first Head Coach of NASL expansion side AC St. Louis. Anelka was fired from the position on 25 June 2010.

After a spell as Head Coach of Floridians FC he was appointed Director of Coaching at Little Haiti FC, of the Florida Youth Soccer Association (FYSA) in February 2015.

== Personal life ==
He is the older brother of professional footballer Nicolas Anelka and acted as his agent in 1999.
