= 2012 Tampa Bay Rowdies season =

Tampa Bay Rowdies
2012 season
- Owners: Andrew Nestor
- Head coach: Ricky Hill
- Stadium: Al Lang Stadium
- NASL: 2nd
- NASL Playoffs: Champions
- U.S. Open Cup: Third Round
- Ponce De Leon Cup: Winners
- Coastal Cup: Winners
- Top goalscorer: League: Mike Ambersley (8); All: Mike Ambersley (11)
- Highest home attendance: 4,710 (July 4 v. Fort Lauderdale)
- Lowest home attendance: 2,194 (April 12 v. Carolina)
- Average home league attendance: 3,116
Home colors	Away colors

The 2012 Tampa Bay Rowdies season was the Tampa Bay Rowdies' third season of existence, and second in the North American Soccer League. Including the original Rowdies franchise and the Tampa Bay Mutiny, this was the 25th season of a professional soccer team fielded in the Tampa Bay region.

== Background ==
After their first season, the FC Tampa Bay Rowdies were forced by Classic Ink to discontinue use of the "Rowdies" name, resulting in their name being FC Tampa Bay. Before the 2012 season began, however, the team came to terms with Classic Ink to purchase the "Rowdies" name.

In the previous season, the Rowdies rallied to a third-place finish before bowing out in a first-round playoff match against eventual NASL Champions NSC Minnesota Stars. In 2012, the Rowdies finished second in the league with a 12–9–7 record. In the 2012 playoffs, they first defeated Carolina RailHawks FC, 5–4, on aggregate in the semifinals to advance to the Soccer Bowl. There they avenged the previous season's playoff loss by defeating defending champion, Minnesota, in the NASL Championship Series. They won the title in dramatic fashion, 3–2, on penalty kicks, after making up a two-goal aggregate deficit in regulation, and then surviving 30 minutes of extra time while short-handed. For the region of Tampa Bay, it was the first North American Soccer League championship since the original Rowdies won Soccer Bowl '75.

== Club ==
=== Roster ===
as of August 25, 2012

No.	Position	Nation	Player
1	GK	USA	Jeff Attinella
2	DF	USA	Daniel Scott
3	DF	CAN	Andres Arango
4	MF	SCO	Stuart Campbell
5	DF	GUY	J. P. Rodrigues
6	FW	USA	Matt Clare
7	DF	USA	Frank Sanfilippo (captain)
8	FW	ENG	Luke Mulholland
9	FW	USA	Dan Antoniuk
11	MF	ENG	Shane Hill
13	DF	USA	Thurstan Johnson
14	DF	USA	Draymond Washington
15	FW	USA	Mike Ambersley
18	MF	USA	Dan O'Brien
19	DF	USA	Eddie Ababio
20	FW	GHA	Evans Frimpong
22	MF	USA	Keith Savage
23	FW	USA	Fabrice Picault
24	GK	USA	Andrew Fontein
25	FW	GUY	Carl Cort
28	MF	USA	Raphael Cox
32	MF	JPN	Takuya Yamada

== Match results ==
Win Tie Loss

=== Friendlies ===
March 3, 2012 Intra-Squad Scrimmage	Orange Team	5–3	White Team	Tampa, Florida
12:00 p.m.	25' (o.g.); Hill 41'; Hofstetter 41', 58'; Gray 54'	Report	Ambersley 20', 46'; Yamada 51'	Stadium: Monroe Middle School

March 10, 2012 Preseason 1	Tampa Bay Rowdies	3–0	Eckerd Tritons	Lakewood Ranch, Florida
6:30 p.m.	Mulholland 17'; Hofstetter 65'; Gray 68'	Report	Hobbis (yellow card) 45'; Duffy (yellow card) 59'	Stadium: Premier Sports Campus

March 14, 2012 Preseason 2	Tampa Bay Rowdies	2–0	Tampa Spartans	St. Petersburg, Florida
7:30 p.m.	Mulholland 33'; Hill (yellow card) 55'; Perucica 73'	https://web.archive.org/web/20160408050334/http://www.rowdiessoccer.com/news/detail/lang/EN/uuid/1c3ta6igpyoto1tnepjrrgflna/rowdies-post-2-0-victory-over-ut TBR Report] [https://www.newspapers.com/image/314762596/?terms=Rowdies	Fekete (yellow card) 73'	Stadium: Walter Fuller Complex

March 17, 2012 Preseason 3	FGCU Eagles	0–1	Tampa Bay Rowdies	Fort Myers, Florida
2:00 p.m.		Report	Savage 45'	Stadium: FGCU Soccer Complex

March 21, 2012 Preseason 4	Tampa Bay Rowdies	Cancelled	UCF Knights	Tampa, Florida
7:00 p.m.		Report		Stadium: Ed Radice Sports Complex
Note: Cancelled due to inclement weather.

March 24, 2012 Preseason 4	USF Bulls	0–1	Tampa Bay Rowdies	Tampa, Florida
7:30 p.m.		Report	Clare 1'; Mulholland (yellow card) 79'	Stadium: Corbett Soccer Stadium

March 28, 2012 Preseason 5	Tampa Bay Rowdies	4–0	Saint Leo Lions	Clearwater, Florida
7:00 p.m.	Yoshitake 25'; Arango (yellow card) 38'; Yamada 83'; Clare 84'; Mulholland 85'	Report		Stadium: Countryside Sportsplex

March 31, 2012 Preseason 6	Tampa Bay Rowdies	3–4	Fort Lauderdale Strikers	Auburndale, Florida
	Yoshitake 11'; Ambersley 64', 84'; Yamada (yellow card) 82'	Report	Herron 16'; Lorenz 27'; Hassan 46'; Shanosky (yellow card) 59'; Anderson 84'	Stadium: FYSA Auburndale Complex

=== North America Soccer League ===
All times from this point on are Eastern Daylight Time (UTC-04:00)

==== Standings ====
Pos	Team	Pld	W	D	L	GF	GA	GD	Pts	Qualification
1	San Antonio Scorpions (X)	28	13	8	7	46	27	+19	47	Playoff semifinals
2	Tampa Bay Rowdies (C)	28	12	9	7	37	30	+7	45	Playoff semifinals
3	Puerto Rico Islanders	28	11	8	9	32	30	+2	41	Playoff quarterfinals
4	Carolina RailHawks	28	10	10	8	44	46	−2	40	Playoff quarterfinals
5	Fort Lauderdale Strikers	28	9	9	10	40	46	−6	36	Playoff quarterfinals

Source: NASL Standings
Rules for classification: 1) points; 2) goal difference; 3) number of goals scored.
(C) Champions; (X) Commissioner's Cup (regular season champion)

==== Results summary ====
Overall								Home						Away					
Pld	W	D	L	GF	GA	GD	Pts	W	D	L	GF	GA	GD	W	D	L	GF	GA	GD
28	12	9	7	37	30	+7	45	7	5	1	18	8	+10	5	4	6	19	22	−3

Last updated: September 23, 2012.
Source: Match reports

Round	1	2	3	4	5	6	7	8	9	10	11	12	13	14	15	16	17	18	19	20	21	22	23	24	25	26	27	28
Stadium	A	H	H	A	H	A	H	A	H	A	A	A	H	H	H	A	A	H	H	A	H	A	H	A	H	A	H	A
Result	L	W	D	D	W	L	L	W	D	L	L	W	W	W	W	L	W	W	W	D	D	L	D	W	D	W	D	D

Updated to match(es) played on September 19, 2012. Source: Match results
A = Away; H = Home; W = Win; D = Draw; L = Loss

==== Match results ====
Win Tie Loss

April 7, 2012 Match 1 Ponce De Leon Cup	Puerto Rico Islanders	1–0	Tampa Bay Rowdies	Bayamon, Puerto Rico
7:30 p.m. EDT	Addlery (yellow card) 21'; Delgado (yellow card) 25'; Fojo (yellow card) 43'; Cunningham (red card) 59'; Addlery 69'	Report	Hill (yellow card) 45'; Yamada (yellow card) 68'; Sanfilippo (yellow card) 90'	Stadium: Bayamon Sports Complex; Attendance: 952; Referee: Javier Santos

April 14, 2012 Match 2	Tampa Bay Rowdies	1–0	FC Edmonton	St. Petersburg, Florida
7:30 p.m. EDT	Yamada 20'; Hill (yellow card) 82'	Report	Joseph-Augustin (yellow card) 26'; Oppong (yellow card) 67' van Leerdam (yellow card) 78'; Hatchi (yellow card) 84'; Saiko (yellow card) 90+2'	Stadium: Al Lang Stadium; Attendance: 3,129; Referee: Fotis Bazakos

April 18, 2012 Match 3	Tampa Bay Rowdies	1–1	Carolina RailHawks FC	St. Petersburg, Florida
7:30 p.m. EDT	Yoshitake 70'	Report	Shriver 65'	Stadium: Al Lang Stadium; Attendance: 2,288; Referee: Armando Villarreal

April 21, 2012 Match 4	Atlanta Silverbacks	1–1	Tampa Bay Rowdies	Atlanta, Georgia
7:30 p.m. EDT	Robertson (yellow card) 73'; Navia 87'	Report	Antoniuk 70'; Mulholland (yellow card) 84'	Stadium: Atlanta Silverbacks Park; Attendance: 3,261; Referee: Ismail Elfath

April 28, 2012 Match 5 Ponce De Leon Cup	Tampa Bay Rowdies	3–1	Fort Lauderdale Strikers	St. Petersburg, Florida
7:30 p.m. EDT	Clare 27'; Ambersley 62' (pen.); Rodrigues (yellow card) 63'; Savage 90+'	Report 1 Report 2	Ståhl (yellow card) 42'; Restrepo 90'	Stadium: Al Lang Stadium; Attendance: 3,536; Referee: Kevin Terry, Jr.

May 5, 2012 Match 6	San Antonio Scorpions FC	2–0	Tampa Bay Rowdies	San Antonio, Texas
8:30 p.m. EDT	Kling (yellow card) 44'; Denissen 53' (pen.); Cochrane (yellow card) 61'; Pitchkolan 66'	Report	Arango (yellow card) 52'	Stadium: Heroes Stadium; Attendance: 9,536; Referee: Hayer Reyes

May 12, 2012 Match 7	Tampa Bay Rowdies	1–2	San Antonio Scorpions FC	St. Petersburg, Florida
7:30 p.m. EDT	Antoniuk 55'; Ramírez (yellow card) 78'	Report	Campos 53', 90+4'; Scott (yellow card) 61'; Hill (yellow card) 63'	Stadium: Al Lang Stadium; Attendance: 3,166; Referee: Javier Santos

May 19, 2012 Match 8	Atlanta Silverbacks	2–3	Tampa Bay Rowdies	Atlanta, Georgia
7:30 p.m. EDT	Davis (yellow card) 51'; Moroney 64', 89'; Carr (yellow card) 80'	Report	Antoniuk 12', 37'; Yamada (yellow card) 60'; Ambersley 78'	Stadium: Atlanta Silverbacks Park; Attendance: 5,000; Referee: Marcos de Oliveira

May 25, 2012 Match 9	Tampa Bay Rowdies	0–0	Minnesota Stars FC	St. Petersburg, Florida
7:30 p.m. EDT	Campbell (yellow card) 69'	Report		Stadium: Al Lang Stadium; Attendance: 3,182; Referee: Ted Unkel

June 2, 2012 Match 10; Ponce De Leon Cup	Fort Lauderdale Strikers	3–1	Tampa Bay Rowdies	Fort Lauderdale, Florida
7:30 p.m. EDT	Thompson 53' (pen.); Anderson 54'; Stewart (yellow card) 86'; Orozco (yellow card) 88'; Restrepo 90+2'	Report	Mulholland 33'; Ambersley (yellow card) 62'	Stadium: Lockhart Stadium; Attendance: 3,255; Referee: Kevin Terry

June 9, 2012 Match 11; Ponce De Leon Cup	Puerto Rico Islanders	2–0	Tampa Bay Rowdies	Bayamon, Puerto Rico
7:30 p.m. EDT	Fojo (yellow card) 40'; Rivera (yellow card) 73'; Needham 81' vanSchaik 90+4'	Report	Picault (yellow card) 30'; Arango (yellow card) 51'	Stadium: Bayamon Sports Complex; Attendance: 1,012; Referee: Jesus Angel Delgado Lebron

June 16, 2012 Match 12	Minnesota Stars FC	1–2	Tampa Bay Rowdies	Blaine, Minnesota
8:30 p.m. EDT	Nuñez 8'; Nuñez (yellow card) 25'; Kallman (yellow card) 90+1'	Report	Yoshitake 45+1'; Hill (yellow card) 45+1'; Savage 85'; Ambersley (yellow card) 89'	Stadium: National Sports Center; Attendance: 2,908

June 23, 2012 Match 13	Tampa Bay Rowdies	3–2	San Antonio Scorpions FC	St. Petersburg, Florida
7:30 p.m. EDT	Yoshitake 39', 90'; Mulholland 88'	Report	Greenfield 31'; Bayona 52'; Pitchkolan (yellow card) 59'; Harmse (yellow card) 71'	Stadium: Al Lang Stadium; Attendance: 2,559; Referee: Christina Ibañez

June 30, 2012 Match 14	Tampa Bay Rowdies	2–0	Minnesota Stars FC	St. Petersburg, Florida
7:30 p.m. EDT	Ambersley 55'; Yoshitake 88'	Report		Stadium: Al Lang Stadium; Attendance: 2,594; Referee: Kevin Terry

July 4, 2012 Match 15; Ponce De Leon Cup	Tampa Bay Rowdies	3–1	Fort Lauderdale Strikers	St. Petersburg, Florida
6:30 p.m. EDT	Ambersley 30'; Yoshitake 67'; Antoniuk 85'; Rodrigues (yellow card) 86' (yellow-red card) 90'	Report	Herron 19', (yellow card) 67'; Orozco (yellow card) 26' (yellow-red card) 79'	Stadium: Al Lang Stadium; Attendance: 4,710; Referee: Ismail Elfath

July 12, 2012 Match 16	Minnesota Stars FC	2–1	Tampa Bay Rowdies	Blaine, Minnesota
8:30 p.m. EDT	Nuñez 30'; Dias (yellow card) 37'; Takada 44'; Venegas (yellow card) 64'	Report	Ambersley 78'	Stadium: National Sports Center; Attendance: 2,164

July 15, 2012 Match 17	FC Edmonton	0–1	Tampa Bay Rowdies	Edmonton, Alberta
4:00 p.m. EDT	Hatchi (yellow card) 36'; Lam (yellow card) 70'	Report	Yoshitake (red card) 33'; Mulholland 88'	Stadium: Clarke Stadium; Attendance: 1,688

July 21, 2012 Match 18; Ponce De Leon Cup	Tampa Bay Rowdies	2–0	Puerto Rico Islanders	St. Petersburg, Florida
7:30 p.m. EDT	Sanfilippo (yellow card) 57', (goal) 72'; Ambersley 85'	Report		Stadium: Al Lang Stadium; Attendance: 3,207

July 28, 2012 Match 19	Tampa Bay Rowdies	1–0	FC Edmonton	St. Petersburg, Florida
7:30 p.m. EDT	Antoniuk 44'	Report	Arguez (yellow card) 20'; Barthélémy (yellow card) 33'	Stadium: Al Lang Stadium; Attendance: 3,149

August 4, 2012 Match 20	Carolina RailHawks FC	3–3	Tampa Bay Rowdies	Cary, North Carolina
7:00 p.m. EDT	da Luz (yellow card) 21'; Zimmerman 43', 49'; Garey 52'; Stockley (yellow card) 59'	Report	Hill 17'; Mulholland 86'; Yamada 90+2'	Stadium: WakeMed Soccer Park; Attendance: 5,002

August 11, 2012 Match 21	Tampa Bay Rowdies	0–0	Atlanta Silverbacks	St. Petersburg, Florida
7:30 p.m. EDT	Mulholland (yellow card) 84'; Arango (yellow card) 90'	Report	Willis (yellow card) 54'; Randolph (yellow card) 70'	Stadium: Al Lang Stadium; Attendance: 3,027

August 19, 2012 Match 22	San Antonio Scorpions FC	4–0	Tampa Bay Rowdies	San Antonio, Texas
8:30 p.m. EDT	Ramírez 8'; Campos 17', 29'; Sattler (yellow card) 56'; Bayona 90+2'	Report	Sanfilippo (yellow card) 45'; Hill (yellow card) 49'; Mulholland (yellow card) 52'; Ambersley (yellow card) 56'	Stadium: Heroes Stadium; Attendance: 7,024

August 25, 2012 Match 23; Ponce De Leon Cup	Tampa Bay Rowdies	0–0	Puerto Rico Islanders	St. Petersburg, Florida
7:30 p.m. EDT	Cox (yellow card) 54'; Mulholland (yellow card) 68'	Report	Nurse (yellow card) 34'; Ibeagha (yellow card) 83'	Stadium: Al Lang Stadium; Attendance: 3,125; Referee: Ted Unkel

September 1, 2012 Match 24; Ponce De Leon Cup	Fort Lauderdale Strikers	0–3	Tampa Bay Rowdies	Fort Lauderdale, Florida
7:30 p.m. EDT	Laing (yellow card) 1'; Tetteh (red card) 19'; Ståhl (yellow card) 53'	Report	Arango (yellow card) 21'; Picault (yellow card) 53'; Sanfilippo (yellow card) 59' (goal) 82'; Cox 80'; Scott (yellow card) 88'; Cort 90+4'	Stadium: Lockhart Stadium; Attendance: 5,629

September 8, 2012 Match 25	Tampa Bay Rowdies	1–1	Atlanta Silverbacks	St. Petersburg, Florida
7:30 p.m. EDT	Yamada 42'; Ababio (yellow card) 53' (yellow-red card) 67'	Report	Horth 30'; Carr (yellow card) 87'	Stadium: Al Lang Stadium; Attendance: 3,754

September 16, 2012 Match 26	FC Edmonton	0–3	Tampa Bay Rowdies	Edmonton, Alberta
4:00 p.m. EDT	Barthélémy (yellow card) 45'; Rago (yellow card) 87'	Report	Antoniuk 21'; Ambersley (yellow card) 39' (goal) 43'; Mulholland 51'	Stadium: Clarke Stadium; Attendance: 1,376

September 19, 2012 Match 27	Tampa Bay Rowdies	1–1	Carolina RailHawks FC	St. Petersburg, Florida
7:30 p.m. EDT	Arango 13' (yellow card) 22'	Report	Shipalane 61'	Stadium: Al Lang Stadium; Attendance: 2,194

September 22, 2012 Match 28	Carolina RailHawks FC	0–0	Tampa Bay Rowdies	Cary, North Carolina
7:00 p.m. EDT		Report	Frimpong (yellow card) 68'; Hill (yellow card) 90'	Stadium: WakeMed Soccer Park; Attendance: 7,310

==== Playoffs ====
October 6, 2012
7:00 p.m. EDT
Semifinals - 1st Leg

Carolina RailHawks	1–2	Tampa Bay Rowdies
Shriver 78' (pen.); Lowery (yellow card) 86'; Franks (yellow card) 89'	Report	Ambersley 64' (yellow card) 90+'; Arango (yellow card) 77'; Attinella (yellow card) 83'; Antoniuk 85'

WakeMed Soccer Park, Cary, North Carolina
Attendance: 3,183
Referee: Matthew Foerster
October 13, 2012
7:30 p.m. EDT
Semifinals - 2nd Leg

Tampa Bay Rowdies	3–3	Carolina RailHawks
Hill 40' (pen.); Ambersley 65'; Mulholland 84' (yellow card) 90+2'	Report	Shriver 14'; Shipalane 18'; Agbossoumonde (yellow card) 35'; Zimmerman 86' (pen.)

Al Lang Stadium, St. Petersburg, Florida
Attendance: 4,132
Referee: Robert Sibiga

Tampa Bay won 5–4 on aggregate and qualified for the NASL Championship Series.

October 20, 2012
8:30 p.m. EDT
Championship Series - 1st Leg

Minnesota Stars FC	2–0	Tampa Bay Rowdies
Walker 67'; Takada (yellow card) 84'; Nuñez 90+4'	Report	Ambersley (yellow card) 48'

National Sports Center, Blaine, Minnesota
Attendance: 4,642
October 27, 2012
7:30 p.m. EDT
Championship Series - 2nd Leg

Tampa Bay Rowdies	3–1 (a.e.t.)	Minnesota Stars FC
Cort 25' (yellow card) 58'; Ambersley (yellow card) 26'; Savage 51'; Mulholland (yellow card) 82'; Antoniuk 86' (yellow card) 90+'; Hill (red card) 90'	Report	Davis (yellow card) 32'; Bracalello (yellow card) 45+'; Rodríguez 52'
Penalties
Mulholland (penalty scored); Cox (penalty scored); Picault (penalty scored); Cort (penalty missed)	3–2	(penalty scored) Hlavaty; (penalty missed) Del Do; (penalty missed) Altman; (penalty scored) Bracalello; (penalty missed) Rodríguez

Al Lang Stadium, St. Petersburg, Florida
Attendance: 6,208

3–3 on aggregate; Tampa Bay won the 2012 NASL Championship on penalty kicks.

=== U.S. Open Cup ===
Tampa Bay entered with the other U.S.-based teams from the NASL and USL Pro in the second round. The first two rounds were drawn on May 1, 2012.

May 22, 2012 Second round	Jacksonville United (Florida)	0–3	(Florida) Tampa Bay Rowdies	Jacksonville, Florida
19:00 EST	Donaldson (yellow card) 51'	Report	Ambersley 2'; Antoniuk 19'; Savage 65'	Stadium: Patton Park; Attendance: 925

May 29, 2012 Third round	Tampa Bay Rowdies (Florida)	1–3	Colorado Rapids	St. Petersburg, Florida
20:00 EST	Antoniuk (yellow card) 19'; Washington (yellow card) 56'; Clare 90+2'	Report	Edu 17' (pen.); Akpan 33'; Thompson (yellow card) 55'; Marshall (yellow card) 57'; Hill 90+1'; Ceus (yellow card) 90+2'	Stadium: Al Lang Stadium; Attendance: 3,086

=== Ponce De Leon Cup ===
The Ponce De Leon Cup was a fan-based derby and trophy that was created in 2006. Participants were originally United Soccer Leagues first division teams (later USSF-D2, then NASL teams) based in lands that Spanish explorer, Juan Ponce de León, had visited; namely Florida and Puerto Rico. It was awarded to the club with the best record in league games versus the other participants. The trophy itself was purported to have been destroyed in 2010 in a warehouse fire. 2012 was the final year that the cup was awarded, as the Puerto Rico Islanders ceased operation following the NASL season.

Pos	Team	GP	W	D	L	GF	GA	GD	Pts
1	Tampa Bay Rowdies	8	4	1	3	12	8	+4	13
2	Puerto Rico Islanders	8	3	3	2	8	6	+2	12
3	Fort Lauderdale Strikers	8	2	2	4	9	15	-6	8

== Honors ==
- NASL Champions
- NASL Fair Play Award

=== Individual honors ===
- NASL Coach of the Year

Ricky Hill

- NASL Best XI

Jeff Attinella, Takuya Yamada, Luke Mulholland

== See also ==
- 2012 in American soccer
- 2012 North American Soccer League season
