= 2012 North American Soccer League season =

Soccer league season

North American Soccer League
- Season: 2012
- Champions: Tampa Bay Rowdies
- North American Supporters' Trophy: San Antonio Scorpions
- Champions League (CFU): Puerto Rico Islanders (2012 CFU Club Championship 3rd place)
- Matches: 112
- Goals: 294 (2.63 per match)
- Top goalscorer: (Brazil) Pablo Campos (20 goals)
- Biggest home win: SAS 8–0 CAR (July 28)
- Biggest away win: SAS 0–4 PRI (April 15)
- Highest scoring: CAR 4–4 ATL (April 14); FTL 5–3 ATL (July 28); SAS 8–0 CAR (July 28)
- Longest winning run: 4 matches: San Antonio (April 28 – May 19); Carolina (June 2 – June 23); Tampa Bay (June 16 – July 4)
- Longest unbeaten run: 9 matches: Minnesota (April 7 – June 2); San Antonio (April 21 – June 16)
- Longest winless run: 9 matches: Carolina (April 7 – May 19); Atlanta (April 7 – May 26); Minnesota (July 18 – September 8)
- Longest losing run: 5 matches: Atlanta (June 9 – July 3)
- Highest attendance: 13,151; PRI @ SAS (April 15)
- Lowest attendance: 520; EDM @ PRI (April 18)
- Average attendance: 3,810

The 2012 North American Soccer League season was the 45th season of Division II soccer in the United States and the second season of the revived North American Soccer League. It was contested by eight teams including one from Canada and one from Puerto Rico. The Montreal Impact were self-promoted to Major League Soccer as an expansion franchise and the expansion San Antonio Scorpions were added to the NASL. The NASL received full sanctioning from the United States Soccer Federation on March 3, 2012, at their annual meeting. The defending Soccer Bowl champions were the NSC Minnesota Stars, while the Carolina Railhawks were the defending North American Supporters' Trophy winners.

== Personnel and sponsorship ==
| Team | Head coach | Captain | Shirt sponsor |
|---|---|---|---|
| Puerto Rico Islanders | Adrian Whitbread | Noah Delgado | Toyota |
| Carolina RailHawks | Colin Clarke | Kupono Low | BCBSA |
| FC Edmonton | Harry Sinkgraven | Chris Kooy | Sears Canada |
| Atlanta Silverbacks | Brian Haynes | Martyn Lancaster | Reto Sports |
| Fort Lauderdale Strikers | Daryl Shore | Toni Ståhl | Joma |
| Minnesota Stars | Manny Lagos | Kyle Altman | Admiral |
| San Antonio Scorpions | Tim Hankinson | Kevin Harmse | Nike |
| Tampa Bay Rowdies | Ricky Hill | Frank Sanfilippo | Mainsail Suites / United World Soccer |

== Teams ==
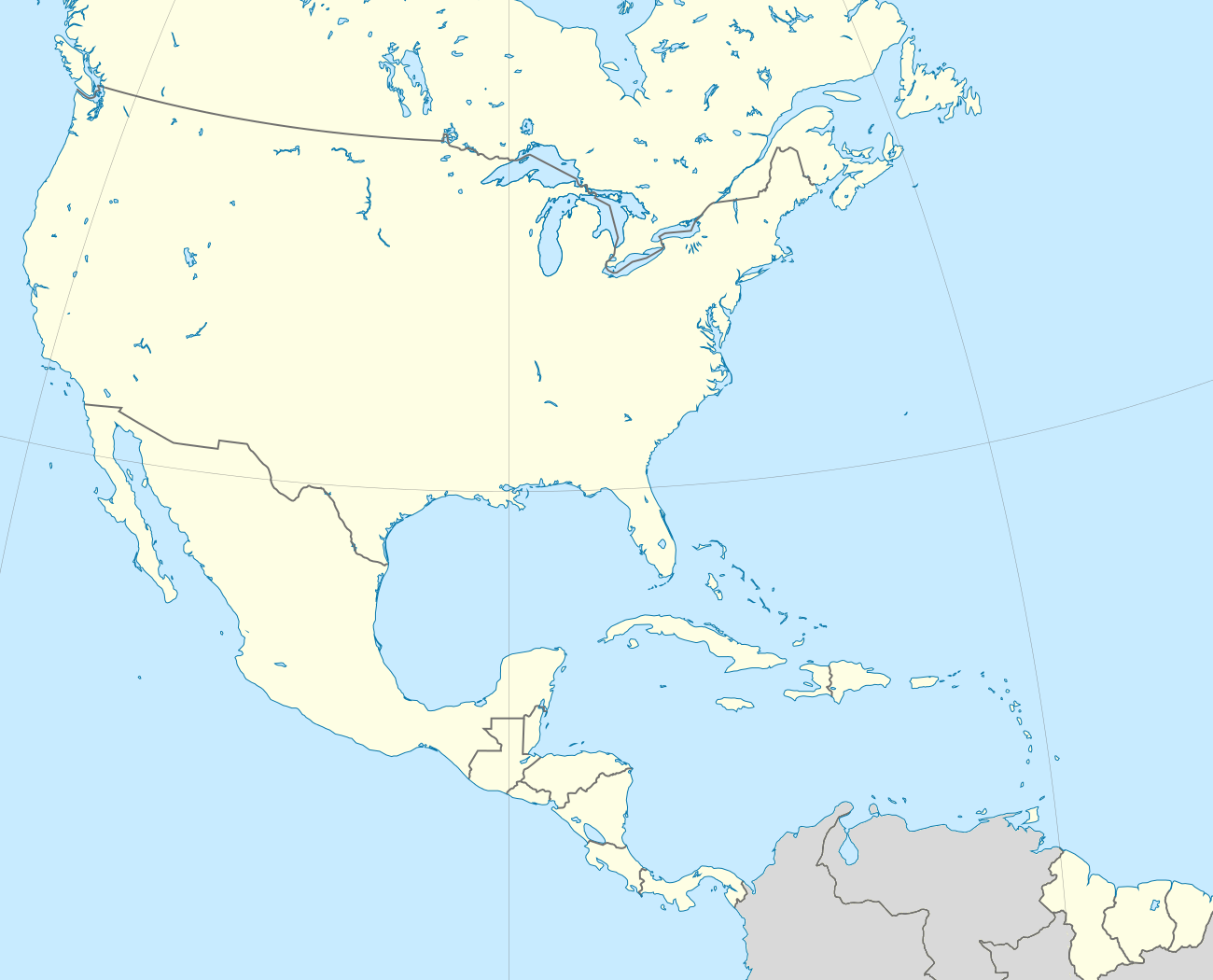
Locations of NASL clubs

== Regular season ==
=== League table ===
| Pos | Team | Pld | W | D | L | GF | GA | GD | Pts | Qualification |
|---|---|---|---|---|---|---|---|---|---|---|
| 1 | San Antonio Scorpions (X) | 28 | 13 | 8 | 7 | 46 | 27 | +19 | 47 | Playoff semifinals |
| 2 | Tampa Bay Rowdies (C) | 28 | 12 | 9 | 7 | 37 | 30 | +7 | 45 | Playoff semifinals |
| 3 | Puerto Rico Islanders | 28 | 11 | 8 | 9 | 32 | 30 | +2 | 41 | Playoff quarterfinals |
| 4 | Carolina RailHawks | 28 | 10 | 10 | 8 | 44 | 46 | −2 | 40 | Playoff quarterfinals |
| 5 | Fort Lauderdale Strikers | 28 | 9 | 9 | 10 | 40 | 46 | −6 | 36 | Playoff quarterfinals |
| 6 | Minnesota United | 28 | 8 | 11 | 9 | 34 | 33 | +1 | 35 | Playoff quarterfinals |
| 7 | Atlanta Silverbacks | 28 | 7 | 9 | 12 | 35 | 46 | −11 | 30 | |
| 8 | FC Edmonton | 28 | 5 | 10 | 13 | 26 | 36 | −10 | 25 | |

Source: NASL Standings
Rules for classification: 1) points; 2) goal difference; 3) number of goals scored.
(C) Champions; (X) Commissioner's Cup (regular season champion)

=== Results ===
Abbreviation and Color Key: Atlanta Silverbacks – ATL • Carolina RailHawks FC – CAR • FC Edmonton – EDM • Fort Lauderdale Strikers – FTL Minnesota Stars FC – MIN • Puerto Rico Islanders – PRI • San Antonio Scorpions FC – SAS • Tampa Bay Rowdies – TAM Win • Loss • Draw • Home
| Club | Match | | | | | | | | | | | | | | | | | | | | | | | | | | | |
| Club | 1 | 2 | 3 | 4 | 5 | 6 | 7 | 8 | 9 | 10 | 11 | 12 | 13 | 14 | 15 | 16 | 17 | 18 | 19 | 20 | 21 | 22 | 23 | 24 | 25 | 26 | 27 | 28 |
|---|---|---|---|---|---|---|---|---|---|---|---|---|---|---|---|---|---|---|---|---|---|---|---|---|---|---|---|---|
| Atlanta Silverbacks | SAS | CAR | TAM | MIN | MIN | EDM | PRI | TAM | FTL | EDM | SAS | CAR | PRI | SAS | CAR | MIN | PRI | EDM | FTL | FTL | TAM | MIN | CAR | EDM | TAM | FTL | SAS | PRI |
| Atlanta Silverbacks | 0–0 | 4–4 | 1–1 | 3–3 | 0–2 | 0–2 | 0–3 | 2–3 | 1–1 | 2–1 | 0–3 | 1–2 | 1–2 | 0–3 | 1–2 | 2–0 | 2–1 | 1–2 | 3–5 | 4–2 | 0–0 | 0–0 | 0–1 | 2–0 | 1–1 | 1–0 | 3–1 | 1–1 |
| Carolina RailHawks | MIN | ATL | TAM | PRI | SAS | FTL | EDM | MIN | PRI | PRI | MIN | ATL | EDM | FTL | ATL | FTL | MIN | SAS | TAM | FTL | EDM | ATL | PRI | SAS | EDM | SAS | TAM | TAM |
| Carolina RailHawks | 0–0 | 4–4 | 1–1 | 1–3 | 0–1 | 3–3 | 0–3 | 1–2 | 1–1 | 2–1 | 5–1 | 2–1 | 2–0 | 1–2 | 2–1 | 3–3 | 1–0 | 0–8 | 3–3 | 0–1 | 3–2 | 1–0 | 3–1 | 0–1 | 2–2 | 2–1 | 1–1 | 0–0 |
| FC Edmonton | FTL | TAM | PRI | MIN | CAR | ATL | SAS | SAS | ATL | FTL | FTL | CAR | PRI | SAS | PRI | TAM | ATL | TAM | MIN | SAS | PRI | CAR | MIN | ATL | MIN | CAR | TAM | FTL |
| FC Edmonton | 0–1 | 0–1 | 0–0 | 3–4 | 3–0 | 2–0 | 0–2 | 2–2 | 1–2 | 1–0 | 0–1 | 0–2 | 0–0 | 0–1 | 1–1 | 0–1 | 2–1 | 0–1 | 1–1 | 1–1 | 1–0 | 2–3 | 1–1 | 0–2 | 1–1 | 2–2 | 0–3 | 2–2 |
| Fort Lauderdale Strikers | EDM | MIN | SAS | PRI | TAM | CAR | PRI | MIN | ATL | TAM | EDM | EDM | MIN | CAR | TAM | CAR | SAS | MIN | SAS | ATL | ATL | CAR | PRI | SAS | TAM | PRI | ATL | EDM |
| Fort Lauderdale Strikers | 1–0 | 0–0 | 2–2 | 3–2 | 1–3 | 3–3 | 0–2 | 1–3 | 1–1 | 3–1 | 0–1 | 1–0 | 1–2 | 2–1 | 1–3 | 3–3 | 2–2 | 2–1 | 0–1 | 5–3 | 2–4 | 1–0 | 0–0 | 2–1 | 0–3 | 1–1 | 0–1 | 2–2 |
| Minnesota Stars FC | CAR | FTL | EDM | ATL | ATL | CAR | FTL | TAM | SAS | CAR | TAM | FTL | TAM | PRI | ATL | TAM | FTL | CAR | PRI | EDM | SAS | ATL | EDM | SAS | EDM | PRI | PRI | SAS |
| Minnesota Stars FC | 0–0 | 0–0 | 4–3 | 3–3 | 2–0 | 2–1 | 3–1 | 0–0 | 0–0 | 1–5 | 1–2 | 2–1 | 0–2 | 4–0 | 0–2 | 2–1 | 1–2 | 0–1 | 0–1 | 1–1 | 0–1 | 0–0 | 1–1 | 1–1 | 1–1 | 4–0 | 0–2 | 1–1 |
| Puerto Rico Islanders | TAM | SAS | EDM | CAR | FTL | FTL | ATL | CAR | CAR | TAM | SAS | ATL | EDM | MIN | EDM | SAS | ATL | TAM | MIN | SAS | EDM | FTL | TAM | CAR | FTL | MIN | MIN | ATL |
| Puerto Rico Islanders | 1–0 | 4–0 | 0–0 | 3–1 | 2–3 | 2–0 | 3–0 | 1–1 | 1–2 | 2–0 | 0–2 | 2–1 | 0–0 | 0–4 | 1–1 | 1–0 | 1–2 | 0–2 | 1–0 | 2–1 | 0–1 | 0–0 | 0–0 | 1–3 | 1–1 | 0–4 | 2–0 | 1–1 |
| San Antonio Scorpions FC | ATL | PRI | FTL | CAR | TAM | TAM | EDM | EDM | MIN | ATL | PRI | TAM | ATL | EDM | PRI | FTL | FTL | CAR | PRI | EDM | MIN | TAM | FTL | MIN | CAR | CAR | ATL | MIN |
| San Antonio Scorpions FC | 0–0 | 0–4 | 2–2 | 1–0 | 2–0 | 2–1 | 2–0 | 2–2 | 0–0 | 3–0 | 2–0 | 2–3 | 3–0 | 1–0 | 0–1 | 2–2 | 1–0 | 8–0 | 1–2 | 1–1 | 1–0 | 4–0 | 1–2 | 1–1 | 1–0 | 1–2 | 1–3 | 1–1 |
| Tampa Bay Rowdies | PRI | EDM | CAR | ATL | FTL | SAS | SAS | ATL | MIN | FTL | PRI | MIN | SAS | MIN | FTL | MIN | EDM | PRI | EDM | CAR | ATL | SAS | PRI | FTL | ATL | EDM | CAR | CAR |
| Tampa Bay Rowdies | 0–1 | 1–0 | 1–1 | 1–1 | 3–1 | 0–2 | 1–2 | 3–2 | 0–0 | 1–3 | 0–2 | 2–1 | 3–2 | 2–0 | 3–1 | 1–2 | 1–0 | 2–0 | 1–0 | 3–3 | 0–0 | 0–4 | 0–0 | 3–0 | 1–1 | 3–0 | 1–1 | 0–0 |

Final regular season results.

== Playoffs ==
The six qualifying teams were seeded 1 through 6, with the top team in the standings receiving the number 1 seed.

The format of the playoffs consisted of quarterfinals, semifinals, and a final. The quarterfinals were single games while the semifinals and final were each a two-game series with each team playing at home once and the team with the greater number of aggregate goals in both games winning the series.

The number 1 seed and the number 2 seed received byes while the number 3 seed hosted the number 6 seed and the number 4 seed hosted the number 5 seed in the quarterfinal.

For the semifinal, the number 1 seed was paired with the lower seeded team to qualify from the quarterfinal and the number 2 seed paired with the higher seeded team to qualify from the quarterfinal.

The winners of each semifinal met in the final, known as the Soccer Bowl. In the event of a draw in either quarterfinal game, a 30-minute extra time period was to be played (with the golden goal rule not in effect). If the teams were still locked in a draw following the extra time period, the winner was to be determined by a penalty shootout.

In each semifinal and in the final, if the teams are tied on the number of aggregate goals scored in the series at the conclusion of the second game, the teams were to play a 30-minute extra time period. As in the quarterfinal, the golden goal rule was not in effect. If the teams were still locked in a draw following the extra time period, the winner of the series was to be determined by a penalty shootout.

=== Bracket ===
Quarterfinals
3 | Puerto Rico Islanders | 1
6 | Minnesota Stars | 2
4 | Carolina RailHawks | 3
5 | Fort Lauderdale Strikers | 1

Semifinals
1 | San Antonio Scorpions | 0 | 1 | 1
6 | Minnesota Stars | 0 | 2 | 2
2 | Tampa Bay Rowdies | 2 | 3 | 5
4 | Carolina RailHawks | 1 | 3 | 4

Final
6 | Minnesota Stars | 2 | 1 | 3
2 | Tampa Bay Rowdies | 0 | 3 | 3

=== Quarterfinals ===
| September 29, 2012 | Carolina RailHawks | 3–1 | Fort Lauderdale Strikers | Cary, North Carolina |
| 7:00 pm EDT | Amir Lowery 34' (yellow card) 71'; Ty Shipalane 52' 67'; Floyd Franks (yellow card) 86' | Report | Conor Shanosky (yellow card) 58'; Abe Thompson 61'; Lance Laing (yellow card) 90+' | Stadium: WakeMed Soccer Park; Attendance: 2,534; Referee: Daniel Radford |

| September 30, 2012 | Puerto Rico Islanders | 1–2 | Minnesota Stars | Bayamón, Puerto Rico |
| 6:00 pm EDT | David Foley 79'; Josh Hansen (yellow card) 81' | Report | Amani Walker 9'; Miguel Ibarra 41'; Justin Davis (yellow card) 90' | Stadium: Juan Ramón Loubriel Stadium; Attendance: 2,002; Referee: Kevin Terry, Jr. |

=== Semifinals ===
| October 6, 2012 | Carolina RailHawks | 1–2 | Tampa Bay Rowdies | Cary, North Carolina |
| 7:00 pm EDT | Brian Shriver 78' (pen.); Amir Lowery (yellow card) 86'; Floyd Franks (yellow card) 89' | Report | Mike Ambersley 64' (yellow card) 90+'; Andres Arango (yellow card) 77'; Jeff Attinella (yellow card) 83'; Dan Antoniuk 85' | Stadium: WakeMed Soccer Park; Attendance: 3,183; Referee: Matthew Foerster |

| October 13, 2012 | Tampa Bay Rowdies | 3–3 | Carolina RailHawks | St. Petersburg, Florida |
| 7:30 pm EDT | Shane Hill 40' (pen.); Mike Ambersley 65'; Luke Mulholland 84' (yellow card) 90+' | Report | Matt Luzunaris 14'; Ty Shipalane 18'; Gale Agbossoumonde (yellow card) 35'; Nick Zimmerman 86' (pen.) | Stadium: Al Lang Stadium; Attendance: 4,132; Referee: Robert Sibiga |

Tampa Bay Rowdies win 5–4 on aggregate.

| October 6, 2012 | Minnesota Stars | 0–0 | San Antonio Scorpions | Blaine, Minnesota |
| 8:30 pm EDT | Simone Bracalello (yellow card) 21' | Report | Kevin Harmse (yellow card) 86' | Stadium: National Sports Center; Attendance: 2,006; Referee: Marcos Deoliveira |

| October 14, 2012 | San Antonio Scorpions | 1–2 | Minnesota Stars | San Antonio, Texas |
| 6:15 pm CDT | Walter Ramirez (yellow card) 17'; Pablo Campos 25' (red card) 27'; Kevin Harmse (yellow card) 54'; Josue Soto (yellow card) 89' | Report | Kyle Altman (yellow card) 28'; Neil Hlavaty (yellow card) 67'; Blake Wagner 76' (o.g.); Simone Bracalello 83' | Stadium: Heroes Stadium; Attendance: 6,249; Referee: Daniel Fitzgerald |

Minnesota Stars win 2–1 on aggregate.

=== Soccer Bowl 2012 ===
October 20, 2012
8:30 pm EDT

| Minnesota Stars | 2–0 | Tampa Bay Rowdies |
|---|---|---|
| Amani Walker 67'; Kentaro Takada (yellow card) 84'; Martin Nunez 90+' | Report | Mike Ambersley (yellow card) 48' |

National Sports Center, Blaine, Minnesota
Attendance: 4,642
Referee: Kevin Terry, Jr.
October 27, 2012
7:30 pm EDT

| Tampa Bay Rowdies | 3–1 (a.e.t.) | Minnesota Stars |
|---|---|---|
| Carl Cort 25' (yellow card) 58'; Mike Ambersley (yellow card) 26'; Keith Savage 51'; Luke Mulholland (yellow card) 82'; Dan Antoniuk 86' (yellow card) 90+'; Shane Hill (red card) 90' | Report | Justin Davis (yellow card) 32'; Simone Bracalello (yellow card) 45+'; Lucas Rodríguez 52' |
Penalties
| Luke Mulholland (penalty scored); Raphael Cox (penalty scored); Fafà Picault (penalty scored); Carl Cort (penalty missed) | 3–2 | (penalty scored) Neil Hlavaty; (penalty missed) Devin Del Do; (penalty missed) Kyle Altman; (penalty scored) Simone Bracalello; (penalty missed) Lucas Rodríguez |

Al Lang Stadium, St. Petersburg, Florida
Attendance: 6,208
Referee: Alejandro Mariscal

Tied 3–3 on aggregate. Tampa Bay Rowdies win Soccer Bowl 2012, 3–2 on penalties.

== Statistical leaders ==
=== Top scorers ===
| Rank | Player | Nation | Club | Goals |
|---|---|---|---|---|
| 1 | Pablo Campos | BRA | San Antonio Scorpions | 20 |
| 2 | Nick Zimmerman | USA | Carolina RailHawks | 15 |
| 3 | Mark Anderson | ENG | Fort Lauderdale Strikers | 11 |
| 4 | Matt Horth | USA | Atlanta Silverbacks | 10 |
| 5 | Nicholas Addlery | JAM | Puerto Rico Islanders | 9 |
| 6 | Andy Herron | CRC | Fort Lauderdale Strikers | 8 |
| 7 | Shaun Saiko | CAN | FC Edmonton | 7 |
| 7 | Amani Walker | JAM | Minnesota Stars | 7 |
| 7 | Dan Antoniuk | USA | Tampa Bay Rowdies | 7 |
| 10 | Mike Ambersley | USA | Tampa Bay Rowdies | 6 |
| 10 | Esteban Bayona | COL | San Antonio Scorpions | 6 |
| 10 | David Foley | ENG | Puerto Rico Islanders | 6 |
| 10 | Aly Hassan | USA | Fort Lauderdale Strikers | 6 |
| 10 | Reinaldo Navia | CHI | Atlanta Silverbacks | 6 |
| 10 | Wálter Restrepo | COL | Fort Lauderdale Strikers | 6 |
| 10 | Tsuyoshi Yoshitake | JPN | Tampa Bay Rowdies | 6 |

=== Top assists ===
| Rank | Player | Nation | Club | Assists |
|---|---|---|---|---|
| 1 | Mike Ambersley | USA | Tampa Bay Rowdies | 8 |
| 1 | Wálter Restrepo | COL | Fort Lauderdale Strikers | 8 |
| 3 | Mike Palacio | USA | Carolina Railhawks | 6 |
| 3 | Walter Ramírez | HON | San Antonio Scorpions | 6 |
| 3 | Shaun Saiko | CAN | FC Edmonton | 6 |
| 6 | Pablo Campos | BRA | San Antonio Scorpions | 5 |
| 6 | Esteban Bayona | COL | San Antonio Scorpions | 5 |
| 6 | Jonathan Faña | DOM | Puerto Rico Islanders | 5 |
| 6 | Luke Mulholland | ENG | Tampa Bay Rowdies | 5 |
| 6 | Keith Savage | USA | Tampa Bay Rowdies | 5 |
| 6 | Tiyi Shipalane | RSA | Carolina RailHawks | 5 |
| 6 | Abe Thompson | USA | Fort Lauderdale Strikers | 5 |
| 6 | Amani Walker | JAM | Minnesota Stars | 5 |

=== Top goalkeepers ===
(Minimum of 1260 Minutes Played)

| Rank | Goalkeeper | Club | MINS | SVS | GA | GAA |
|---|---|---|---|---|---|---|
| 1 | (United States) Daryl Sattler | San Antonio Scorpions | 2151 | 66 | 19 | 0.795 |
| 2 | (United States) Jeff Attinella | Tampa Bay Rowdies | 2520 | 118 | 30 | 1.071 |
| 3 | (England) Richard Martin | Puerto Rico Islanders | 2340 | 106 | 28 | 1.077 |
| 4 | (United States) Matt Van Oekel | Minnesota Stars FC | 2250 | 77 | 30 | 1.200 |
| 5 | (United States) Lance Parker | FC Edmonton | 1440 | 42 | 21 | 1.313 |
| 6 | (United States) Matt Glaeser | Fort Lauderdale Strikers | 2430 | 108 | 44 | 1.630 |
| 7 | (United States) Ray Burse | Carolina RailHawks | 2160 | 82 | 41 | 1.708 |
| 8 | (Hungary) Dániel Illyés | Atlanta Silverbacks | 1980 | 86 | 39 | 1.773 |

Source: North American Soccer League

== Awards ==
=== Monthly awards ===
| Month | NASL Player of the Month | | | |
| Month | Player | Nation | Club | Link |
|---|---|---|---|---|
| April | Reinaldo Navia | CHL | Atlanta Silverbacks | 5G |
| May | Shaun Saiko | CAN | FC Edmonton | 5G 2A |
| June | Tsuyoshi Yoshitake | JPN | Tampa Bay Rowdies | 4G 1A |
| July | Pablo Campos | BRA | San Antonio Scorpions | 7G |
| August | Richard Martin | ENG | Puerto Rico Islanders | 13 Saves |
| September | Matt Horth | USA | Atlanta Silverbacks | 4G |
| October | Jeff Attinella | USA | Tampa Bay Rowdies | |

=== Weekly awards ===
| Week | Defensive Player of the Week | | | Offensive Player of the Week | | |
| Week | Player | Nat | Club | Player | Nat | Club |
|---|---|---|---|---|---|---|
| Week 1 | Ray Burse | USA | Carolina RailHawks | Andy Herron | CRC | Fort Lauderdale Strikers |
| Week 2 | Richard Martin | ENG | Puerto Rico Islanders | Jonathan Faña | DOM | Puerto Rico Islanders |
| Week 3 | Richard Martin | ENG | Puerto Rico Islanders | Andy Herron | CRC | Fort Lauderdale Strikers |
| Week 4 | Jeff Attinella | USA | Tampa Bay Rowdies | Reinaldo Navia | CHL | Atlanta Silverbacks |
| Week 5 | Cristiano Dias | BRA | Minnesota Stars | Shaun Saiko | CAN | FC Edmonton |
| Week 6 | Paul Hamilton | CAN | FC Edmonton | Pablo Campos | BRA | San Antonio Scorpions |
| Week 7 | Jonathan Greenfield | RSA | San Antonio Scorpions | Dan Antoniuk | USA | Tampa Bay Rowdies |
| Week 8 | Frank Sanfilippo | USA | Tampa Bay Rowdies | Shaun Saiko | CAN | FC Edmonton |
| Week 9 | Matt Van Oekel | USA | Minnesota Stars | Ciaran O'Brien | USA | Atlanta Silverbacks |
| Week 10 | Lance Parker | USA | FC Edmonton | Pablo Campos | BRA | San Antonio Scorpions |
| Week 11 | Jack Stewart | USA | Fort Lauderdale Strikers | Tsuyoshi Yoshitake | JPN | Tampa Bay Rowdies |
| Week 12 | Ray Burse | USA | Carolina RailHawks | Tsuyoshi Yoshitake | JPN | Tampa Bay Rowdies |
| Week 13 | Jeff Attinella | USA | Tampa Bay Rowdies | Mark Anderson | ENG | Fort Lauderdale Strikers |
| Week 14 | Daniel Illyes | HUN | Atlanta Silverbacks | Mike Palacio | USA | Carolina RailHawks |
| Week 15 | Jeff Attinella | USA | Tampa Bay Rowdies | Pablo Campos | BRA | San Antonio Scorpions |
| Week 16 | Frank Sanfilippo | USA | Tampa Bay Rowdies | Mark Anderson | ENG | Fort Lauderdale Strikers |
| Week 17 | Jeff Attinella | USA | Tampa Bay Rowdies | Pablo Campos | BRA | San Antonio Scorpions |
| Week 18 | Richard Martinez | PUR | Puerto Rico Islanders | Pedro Mendes | BRA | Atlanta Silverbacks |
| Week 19 | Bryan Arguez | USA | FC Edmonton | Andy Herron | CRC | Fort Lauderdale Strikers |
| Week 20 | Conor Shanosky | USA | Fort Lauderdale Strikers | Pablo Campos | BRA | San Antonio Scorpions |
| Week 21 | Akira Fitzgerald | JAP | Carolina Railhawks | Abe Thompson | USA | Fort Lauderdale Strikers |
| Week 22 | Frank Sanfilippo | USA | Tampa Bay Rowdies | Matt Horth | USA | Atlanta Silverbacks |
| Week 23 | Takuya Yamada | JPN | Tampa Bay Rowdies | Shaun Saiko | CAN | FC Edmonton |
| Week 24 | Anthony Vázquez | PUR | Puerto Rico Islanders | Tiyi Shipalane | RSA | Carolina Railhawks |
| Week 25 | Jeff Attinella | USA | Tampa Bay Rowdies | Danny Barrera | USA | Atlanta Silverbacks |

=== League awards ===
- Golden Ball (MVP): (Brazil) Pablo Campos (San Antonio Scorpions)
- Golden Boot: (Brazil) Pablo Campos (San Antonio Scorpions)
- Golden Glove: (United States) Daryl Sattler (San Antonio Scorpions)
- Coach of the Year: (England) Ricky Hill (Tampa Bay Rowdies)
- Play of the Year: (United States) Kevin Venegas (Minnesota Stars FC)
- Fair Play Award: Tampa Bay Rowdies

NASL Best XI
| Position | Players | Team |
|---|---|---|
| Goalkeeper | (United States) Jeff Attinella | Tampa Bay Rowdies |
| Defense | (United States) Kyle Altman | Minnesota United FC |
| Defense | (United States) Ryan Cochrane | San Antonio Scorpions |
| Defense | (Canada) Paul Hamilton | FC Edmonton |
| Defense | (Japan) Takuya Yamada | Tampa Bay Rowdies |
| Midfield | (England) Luke Mulholland | Tampa Bay Rowdies |
| Midfield | (Honduras) Walter Ramírez | San Antonio Scorpions |
| Midfield | (Colombia) Walter Restrepo | Fort Lauderdale Strikers |
| Midfield | (United States) Nick Zimmerman | Carolina RailHawks |
| Forward | (England) Mark Anderson | Fort Lauderdale Strikers |
| Forward | (Brazil) Pablo Campos | San Antonio Scorpions |
