= 2011 FC Tampa Bay season =

FC Tampa Bay
2011 season
- Owners: (United States) Hinds Howard (United States) David Laxer (United States) Andrew Nestor
- Head coach: (England) Ricky Hill
- Stadium: Al Lang Stadium; St. Petersburg, Florida
- NASL: 3rd
- NASL Playoffs: Quarterfinals
- U.S. Open Cup: did not enter
- Ponce De Leon Cup: Runners up
- Coastal Cup: Winners
- Top goalscorer: League: Mike Ambersley (11); All: Mike Ambersley (11)
- Highest home attendance: 4,248 (July 4 v. Fort Lauderdale)
- Lowest home attendance: 1,775 (May 11 v. Edmonton)
- Average home league attendance: 3,087
Home colors	Away colors

2011 FC Tampa Bay season was the second in the club's existence and the first in the NASL.

== Review ==
FC Tampa Bay transitioned from the temporary USSF Division 2 Professional League to the new North American Soccer League, a second division league, and also changed their home pitch, as they moved across Tampa Bay to Al Lang Stadium in St. Petersburg from George M. Steinbrenner Field in Tampa. Former original Rowdie Ricky Hill was named the club's manager in January 2011.

After winning only 2 of their first 10 matches, the club rebounded to finish 3rd in the league table and qualified for the NASL playoffs. They were upset by eventual league champion NSC Minnesota Stars in the quarterfinals by a score of 1–0. Tampa Bay won their second straight Coastal Cup, by taking three out of four matches against their Florida Derby rivals, Fort Lauderdale. Another highlight was a 1–0 mid-season friendly win over the Bolton Wanderers of the English Premier League at Al Lang Stadium. The Rowdies (along with the rest of the NASL) did not participate in the 2011 U.S. Open Cup due to late provisional sanctioning by the USSF.

== Results ==
=== Preseason ===
March 5, 2011 Game 1	Tampa Spartans	1–1	FC Tampa Bay	Tampa, Florida
7:30 PM EDT	Kemal Malcolm 66'	Report	Millien 81'	Stadium: Pepin Stadium

March 12, 2011 Game 2	FC Tampa Bay	1–1	BK Häcken	Sunrise, Florida
3:30 PM EDT	Clare 86'	Report	69'	Stadium: kics International Soccer Complex

March 19, 2011 Game 3	FC Tampa Bay	1–2	United States U-17	Bradenton, Florida
AM	King 17'	Report	33'; 48'	Stadium: IMG Academy

March 19, 2011 Game 4	FC Tampa Bay	2–0	Florida Gulf Coast Eagles	Brandon, Florida
4:00 PM EDT	Sanfilippo 74'; King 88'	Report		Stadium: Brandon Area Youth Soccer Complex

March 27, 2011 Game 5	UCF Knights	0–3	FC Tampa Bay	Orlando, Florida
4:00 PM EDT		Report	Millien 38', 86' (pen.); Burt 77'	Stadium: UCF Soccer and Track Stadium

March 30, 2011 Game 6	FC Tampa Bay	2–0	St. Leo Lions	St. Petersburg, Florida
4:00 PM EDT	Millien 55'; Yoshitake 61'	Report		Stadium: Azalea Youth Soccer Complex
Note: Game called off in the 67th minute due to inclement weather.

April 3, 2011 Game 7	USF Bulls	0–3	FC Tampa Bay	Tampa, Florida
7:00 PM EDT		Report	Savage 23'; King 62'; Jarun 71'	Stadium: Corbett Soccer Stadium

=== NASL ===
April 9, 2011 Game 1	FC Tampa Bay	1–0	Montreal Impact	St. Petersburg, FL
7:00 PM EDT	Yoshitake (yellow card) 45'; Yamada 85'; Ambersley (yellow card) 90+'	Report		Stadium: Progress Energy Park; Attendance: 4,161

April 17, 2011 Game 2	FC Tampa Bay	0–2	Puerto Rico Islanders	St. Petersburg, FL
6:00 PM EDT	Sanfilippo (yellow card) 67'	Report	Pitchkolan (yellow card) 31'; Faña 35' 79'	Stadium: Progress Energy Park; Attendance: 2,913

April 23, 2011 Game 3	Montreal Impact	0–0	FC Tampa Bay	Montreal, QC
2:30 PM EDT	Ech-Chergui (yellow card) 48'; Lowery (yellow card) 58'	Report	Ukah (yellow card) 16'	Stadium: Saputo Stadium; Attendance: 12,060

April 30, 2011 Game 4	FC Tampa Bay	1–1	Atlanta Silverbacks	St. Petersburg, FL
7:00 PM EDT	Ambersley 74'	Report	Hunt (yellow card) 18', (goal) 45+'	Stadium: Progress Energy Park; Attendance: 3,021

May 7, 2011 Game 5	FC Tampa Bay	1–3	Carolina RailHawks	St. Petersburg, FL
7:00 PM EDT	Millien 23'; Sanfilippo (yellow card) 62'	Report	Franks (yellow card) 1'; Barbara 20' 76'; Low (yellow card) 48'; Farber 52'	Stadium: Progress Energy Park; Attendance: 3,325

May 11, 2011 Game 6	FC Tampa Bay	1–1	FC Edmonton	St. Petersburg, FL
7:00 PM EDT	Burt 51'; Ambersley (yellow card) 55'; Sanfilippo (yellow card) 74'	Report	Kooy 90+4'	Stadium: Progress Energy Park; Attendance: 1,775; Referee: Ismail Elfath

May 14, 2011 Game 7	Fort Lauderdale Strikers	Postponed	FC Tampa Bay	Fort Lauderdale, FL
7:30 PM EDT		Report		Stadium: Lockhart Stadium
Note: Postponed due to inclement weather.

May 21, 2011 Game 7	FC Tampa Bay	3–0	Montreal Impact	St. Petersburg, FL
7:00 PM EDT	Ukah 40'; Yoshitake (yellow card) 56', (goal) 84'; Burt (yellow card) 59'; Ambersley 74' (pen.)	Report	Pizzolitto (yellow card) 56'; Di Lorenzo (red card) 74'; Tsiskaridze (yellow card) 76'	Stadium: Progress Energy Park; Attendance: 3,343

May 28, 2011 Game 8	NSC Minnesota Stars	0–0	FC Tampa Bay	Blaine, MN
8:30 PM EDT		Report	Ambersley (yellow card) 31'; Hayes (yellow card) 43'	Stadium: National Sports Center; Attendance: 2,019

May 31, 2011 Game 9	FC Edmonton	4–0	FC Tampa Bay	Edmonton, AB
9:30 PM EDT	Porter 28'; Yamada 37'; Saiko 85'; Chin 88'	Report		Stadium: Foote Field; Attendance: 1,838

June 4, 2011 Game 10	FC Tampa Bay	1–2	Carolina RailHawks	St. Petersburg, FL
7:00 PM EDT	Hayes (yellow card) 53'; Savage (yellow card) 66'; Ukah (yellow card) 68'; Ambersley (yellow card) 82', (goal) 86' (pen.)	Report	Watson (yellow card) 45+'; Barbara 63' (pen.); Zimmerman 65'; Low (yellow card) 67'	Stadium: Progress Energy Park; Attendance: 2,688

June 12, 2011 Game 11	FC Tampa Bay	3–2	Atlanta Silverbacks	St. Petersburg, FL
6:00 PM EDT	Ambersley 31', 54'; Ukah (yellow card) 45+'; Arango (yellow card) 55'; Hayes (yellow card) 65'; King 84'	Report	Hunt 34'; Davis 64'; Toure (yellow card) 83'	Stadium: Progress Energy Park; Attendance: 2,319

June 18, 2011 Game 12	Carolina RailHawks	3–1	FC Tampa Bay	Cary, NC
7:00 PM EDT	Watson 36'; Barbara 69'; Low (yellow card) 84'; Russell 90+'	Report	Ukah 18'; Arango (yellow card) 48'; Watson-Siriboe (yellow card) 78'	Stadium: WakeMed Soccer Park; Attendance: 4,041

June 29, 2011 Game 13	Fort Lauderdale Strikers	1–1	FC Tampa Bay	Fort Lauderdale, FL
7:30 PM EDT	Lennon (yellow card) 83'; Coudet 90+2'	Report 1 Archived March 5, 2016, at the Wayback Machine; Report 2	Ambersley 68'; Yoshitake (yellow card) 77'	Stadium: Lockhart Stadium; Attendance: 5,848
Note: Rescheduled from May 14.

July 4, 2011 Game 14	FC Tampa Bay	4–2	Fort Lauderdale Strikers	St. Petersburg, FL
6:00 PM EDT	Arango 15', (yellow card) 59'; Watson-Siriboe (yellow card) 37'; Millien 55'; King 63'; Ambersley 71'	Report	Coudet 38' (pen.); Palacio 68'	Stadium: Progress Energy Park; Attendance: 4,248

July 9, 2011 Game 15	Puerto Rico Islanders	1–1	FC Tampa Bay	Bayamón, PR
6:05 PM EDT	Cunningham (yellow card) 70'; Foley 82'	Report	King 18'; Millien (yellow card) 61' (yellow-red card) 71'	Stadium: Juan Ramón Loubriel Stadium

July 17, 2011 Game 16	FC Edmonton	1–2	FC Tampa Bay	Edmonton, AB
6:00 PM EDT	Porter 19'	Report	King 30'; Sanfilippo (yellow card) 33'; Ambersley 71'	Stadium: Foote Field; Attendance: 1,574

July 23, 2011 Game 17	Atlanta Silverbacks	2–1	FC Tampa Bay	Atlanta, GA
7:30 PM EDT	Sandoval 7'; Casarona (yellow card) 29'; O'Brien 41'; Parada (yellow card) 86'	Report	King 43'; Morrow (yellow card) 45'; Ukah (yellow card) 90'	Stadium: Atlanta Silverbacks Park; Attendance: 3,515

July 27, 2011 Game 18	FC Tampa Bay	3–1	FC Edmonton	St. Petersburg, FL
7:00 PM EDT	King 6'; Hayes (yellow card) 51'; Hill 60'; Millien 84'	Report	Semenets 28'; Lemire (yellow card) 90'	Stadium: Progress Energy Park; Attendance: 2,003

August 6, 2011 Game 19	Atlanta Silverbacks	0–4	FC Tampa Bay	Atlanta, GA
7:30 PM EDT	Ruthven (yellow card) 61'; Cox (yellow card) 71'	Report	Savage 28' 60'; Ambersley 33'; Clare 82'	Stadium: Atlanta Silverbacks Park; Attendance: 3,126

August 10, 2011 Game 20	Montreal Impact	3–3	FC Tampa Bay	Montreal, QC
7:30 PM EDT	Sutton (yellow card) 16'; Sebrango 46', 75'; Westlake 54'; LeGall (yellow card) 88'	Report	Savage (yellow card) 15'; Hill 38'; King 85'; Gyorio 90'	Stadium: Saputo Stadium; Attendance: 9,860

August 13, 2011 Game 21	FC Tampa Bay	2–0	NSC Minnesota Stars	St. Petersburg, FL
7:00 PM EDT	Millien 45'; Sanfilippo 65'; Ukah (yellow card) 77'; Yoshitake (yellow card) 83'	Report	Cosgriff (yellow card) 62'	Stadium: Progress Energy Park; Attendance: 3,150

August 20, 2011 Game 22	FC Tampa Bay	1–2	Puerto Rico Islanders	St. Petersburg, FL
7:00 PM EDT	Ambersley 30'; Savage (yellow card) 78'	Report	Cunningham (yellow card) 2'; Telesford (yellow card) 36'; Addlery 33'; Foley 75'	Stadium: Progress Energy Park; Attendance: 2,965

August 27, 2011 Game 23	Fort Lauderdale Strikers	0–2	FC Tampa Bay	Fort Lauderdale, FL
7:30 PM EDT	Restrepo (yellow card) 87'	Report	Arango (yellow card) 5'; King 9'; Rodrigues (yellow card) 41'; Ambersley 77', (yellow card) 78'	Stadium: Lockhart Stadium; Attendance: 3,685

September 3, 2011 Game 24	Carolina RailHawks	2–0	FC Tampa Bay	Cary, NC
7:00 PM EDT	Campos 19', 38'; Franks (yellow card) 65'	Report	Hill (yellow card) 46'; Arango (yellow card) 49'; Baptiste (yellow card) 88'	Stadium: WakeMed Soccer Park; Attendance: 3,015

September 6, 2011 Game 25	NSC Minnesota Stars	1–2	FC Tampa Bay	Blaine, MN
8:30 PM EDT	Kallman 51'; Takada (yellow card) 67'	Report	Savage 22'; Gyorio 77'	Stadium: National Sports Center; Attendance: 767

September 10, 2011 Game 26	Puerto Rico Islanders	Postponed	FC Tampa Bay	Bayamón, PR
7:30 PM EDT		Report		Stadium: Juan Ramón Loubriel Stadium
Note: Postponed to September 21 due to Tropical Storm Maria.

September 17, 2011 Game 26	FC Tampa Bay	1–1	NSC Minnesota Stars	St. Petersburg, FL
7:00 PM EDT	King 59'; Ambersley (yellow card) 85'	Report	Cvilikas 54'	Stadium: Progress Energy Park; Attendance: 3,001

September 21, 2011 Game 27	Puerto Rico Islanders	1–0	FC Tampa Bay	Bayamón, PR
7:30 PM EDT	Perez 5'	Report	Rodrigues (yellow card) 62'	Stadium: Juan Ramón Loubriel Stadium; Attendance: 1,502
Note: Rescheduled from September 10.

September 24, 2011 Game 28	FC Tampa Bay	2–0	Fort Lauderdale Strikers	St. Petersburg, FL
7:00 PM EDT	Savage 68'; Clare 90+1'	Report 1 Archived March 5, 2016, at the Wayback Machine; Report 2	Arrieta (red card) 51'	Stadium: Progress Energy Park; Attendance: 3,226

=== Friendlies ===
July 14, 2011	FC Tampa Bay (United States)	1–0	(England) Bolton Wanderers	St. Petersburg, FL
7:30 pm EDT	Clare 65', (yellow card) 85'	Report		Stadium: Progress Energy Park; Attendance: 3,914

=== Playoffs ===
October 1, 2011 Quarterfinals	FC Tampa Bay	0–1	NSC Minnesota Stars	St. Petersburg, FL
7:30 pm EDT	Arango (yellow card) 14'	Report	Mulholland 27'; Cosgriff (yellow card) 55'; Altman (yellow card) 57'	Stadium: Progress Energy Park; Attendance: 3,003

== Club ==
=== First team roster ===
as of August 25, 2011

Note: Flags indicate national team as defined under FIFA eligibility rules; some limited exceptions apply. Players may hold more than one non-FIFA nationality.

No.	Pos.	Nation	Player
1	GK	USA	Daryl Sattler
3	DF	CAN	Andres Arango
4	DF	USA	Kwame Watson-Siriboe (on loan from Chicago)
5	DF	GUY	J. P. Rodrigues
6	FW	USA	Matt Clare
7	DF	USA	Frank Sanfilippo (captain)
8	FW	TTO	Kerry Baptiste
9	FW	USA	Warren Ukah
10	MF	JPN	Tsuyoshi Yoshitake
11	MF	ENG	Shane Hill
13	DF	CUB	Yendry Diaz
14	MF	HAI	Pascal Millien

No.	Pos.	Nation	Player
15	FW	USA	Mike Ambersley
17	MF	CAN	Mozzi Gyorio
18	FW	USA	Aaron King
20	GK	USA	Jeff Attinella
21	MF	NZL	Jeremy Christie
22	MF	USA	Keith Savage
23	MF	USA	David Hayes
28	GK	USA	Evan Newton (on loan from Houston)
32	MF	JPN	Takuya Yamada
77	MF	USA	Chad Burt
—	MF	NIR	Jonny Steele (on loan to Carolina)

=== Coaching staff ===
- (United States) Perry Van der Beck - Executive Vice President, Technical Director, and Director of Player Development
- (England) Ricky Hill - Head Coach
- (United States) Lee Cohen - Director of Operations
- (United States) David Hayes - Assistant Coach
- (Bosnia and Herzegovina) Slobodan Janjuš - Goalkeeper Coach
- (United States) James Faylo - Head Athletic Trainer
- (United States) Harris McIlwain - Team Physician
- (United States) Seth Gasser - Team Physician

== NASL ==
=== Standings ===
Pos	Team	Pld	W	D	L	GF	GA	GD	Pts	Qualification
1	Carolina RailHawks (X)	28	17	3	8	50	26	+24	54	Playoff semifinals
2	Puerto Rico Islanders	28	15	7	6	41	32	+9	52	Playoff semifinals
3	Tampa Bay Rowdies	28	11	8	9	41	36	+5	41	Playoff quarterfinals
4	Fort Lauderdale Strikers	28	9	11	8	35	36	−1	38	Playoff quarterfinals
5	FC Edmonton	28	10	6	12	35	40	−5	36 (Note: EDM: 8 pts; MIN: 2 pts)	Playoff quarterfinals

Source: NASL Standings
Rules for classification: 1) points; 2) head-to-head record; 3) goal difference; 4) number of goals scored.
(X) Regular season champion

=== Results summary ===
Overall								Home						Away					
Pld	W	D	L	GF	GA	GD	Pts	W	D	L	GF	GA	GD	W	D	L	GF	GA	GD
28	11	8	9	41	36	+5	41	7	3	4	24	17	+7	4	5	5	17	19	−2

Last updated: April 26, 2018.
Source: Match reports

=== Ponce De Leon Cup ===
The Ponce De Leon Cup was a fan-based derby and trophy that was created in 2006. Participants were originally United Soccer Leagues first division teams (later USSF-D2, then NASL teams) based in lands that Spanish explorer Juan Ponce de León had visited; namely Florida and Puerto Rico. It was awarded to the club with the best record in league games versus the other participants.

Pos	Team	GP	W	D	L	GF	GA	GD	AWG	Pts
1	Puerto Rico Islanders	8	4	3	1	13	7	+6	7	15
2	FC Tampa Bay	8	3	2	3	11	9	+2	4	11
3	Fort Lauderdale Strikers	8	1	3	4	10	17	-7	5	6

== Honors ==
- NASL Fair Play Award

=== Individual honors ===
- NASL Best XI

Pascal Millien, Mike Ambersley
