= Soccer Bowl 2012 =

Soccer match

NASL Championship Series 2012
- Event: Soccer Bowl
Minnesota Stars	Tampa Bay Rowdies
3	3
- on aggregate Tampa Bay Rowdies won 3–2 on penalties

First leg
Minnesota Stars	Tampa Bay Rowdies
2	0
- Date: October 20, 2012
- Venue: National Sports Center, Blaine, Minnesota
- Man of the Match: Jeff Attinella
- Attendance: 4,642

Second leg
Tampa Bay Rowdies	Minnesota Stars
3	1
- After extra time
- Date: October 27, 2012
- Venue: Al Lang Stadium, St. Petersburg, Florida
- Attendance: 6,208

NASL Championship Series 2012 was the North American Soccer League's postseason championship final of the 2012 season. Also known as the NASL Championship Series 2012, the event was contested in a two-game aggregate match between the Tampa Bay Rowdies and, the defending 2011 NASL champions, the Minnesota Stars. The first leg was held on October 20, 2012, at National Sports Center, in Blaine, Minnesota, while the second on October 27, 2012, at Al Lang Stadium, in St. Petersburg, Florida.

After a two-day competition, both sides were tied at three points apiece. Following extra time, the game went to penalty shoot-out. In the end, the Tampa Bay Rowdies were victorious and became the 2012 NASL champions.

== Background ==
The defending Soccer Bowl champion Minnesota Stars finished sixth in league standings with 35 points and a record of 8–11–9. They qualified for the NASL playoffs as the low seed of six teams. The Stars defeated the third seeded Puerto Rico Islanders in a single-match quarterfinal game, 2–1. In the two-legged semifinals Minnesota defeated the top-seeded San Antonio Scorpions, 2–1, on aggregate. The victory allowed them to advance to their second straight Soccer Bowl.

The Tampa Bay Rowdies finished in second position on the league table with a record of 12-9-7 for 47 points, which was two points behind San Antonio's table-topping total of 49. As the number-two seed in the playoffs the Rowdies earned a quarterfinal bye. Tampa Bay faced the fourth seeded Carolina RailHawks in the semifinals, winning 5–4 on aggregate, which earned them the right to play in Soccer Bowl 2012.

== Game summary ==
Minnesota won the first leg, 2–0, on goals by Amani Walker in the 67th minute and Martin Nunez in injury time. Without an away-goals rule, at a minimum Tampa Bay needed to win the return leg by any two-goal margin to keep hope alive. In the second leg Carl Cort scored on a rebound for the Rowdies in the 25th minute and Keith Savage scored in the 51st minute to level the series. The Stars quickly regained their advantage on a score by Lucas Rodríguez in the 52nd minute. Dan Antoniuk's dramatic 86th-minute goal leveled the aggregate at four apiece, and a few minutes later teammate Shane Hill was given a straight red card during injury time. With neither team able to score in extra time, the match moved to penalty kicks. Luke Mulholland, Raphael Cox, and Fafà Picault all converted from the spot for Tampa Bay, while Rowdies goalie Jeff Attinella saved three of Minnesota's five attempts to secure the Soccer Bowl title for Tampa Bay.

=== Championship results ===
Team 1	Aggregate	Team 2	First leg	Second leg	Attendance
Tampa Bay Rowdies	3–3	Minnesota Stars	0–2	3–1 (a.e.t.) (Penalty Shoot-out 3–2)	October 20 National Sports Center 4,642; October 27 Al Lang Stadium 6,208

==== First leg ====
October 20, 2012
8:30 pm EDT
F – 1st Leg

Minnesota Stars	2–0	Tampa Bay Rowdies
Amani Walker 67'; Kentaro Takada (yellow card) 84'; Martin Nunez 90+4'	Report; Report; Report 3	Mike Ambersley (yellow card) 48'

National Sports Center, Blaine, Minnesota
Attendance: 4,642
Referee: Kevin Terry, Jr.

Minnesota Stars	Tampa Bay

==== Second leg ====
October 27, 2012
7:30 pm EDT
F – 2nd Leg

Tampa Bay Rowdies	3–1 (a.e.t.)	Minnesota Stars
Carl Cort 25' (yellow card) 58'; Mike Ambersley (yellow card) 26'; Keith Savage 51'; Luke Mulholland (yellow card) 82'; Dan Antoniuk 86' (yellow card) 90+1'; Shane Hill (red card) 90'	Report; Report; Report 3	Justin Davis (yellow card) 32'; Simone Bracalello (yellow card) 45+1'; Lucas Rodríguez 52'
Penalties
Luke Mulholland (penalty scored); Raphael Cox (penalty scored); Fafà Picault (penalty scored); Carl Cort (penalty missed)	3–2	(penalty scored) Neil Hlavaty; (penalty missed) Devin Del Do; (penalty missed) Kyle Altman; (penalty scored) Simone Bracalello; (penalty missed) Lucas Rodríguez

Al Lang Stadium, St. Petersburg, Florida
Attendance: 6,208
Referee: Alejandro Mariscal

Tampa Bay	Minnesota Stars

2012 NASL Champions: Tampa Bay Rowdies

== See also ==
- 2012 in American soccer
- 2012 North American Soccer League season
