= Keith Savage (disambiguation) =

Keith Savage (born 1985) is American soccer player and coach.

Keith Savage may also refer to:

- Keith Savage (cricketer) (1926-1979), Australian cricketer
- Keith Savage (rugby union) (born 1940), English rugby union player
