= USA Cup =

International youth soccer tournament

The United States [of] America Cup (USA Cup) (Formerly Schwans Cup, Schwans USA Cup) is the largest international youth soccer tournament in the Western Hemisphere. It was founded by Ivar Sorensen and Ingeborg Sorensen in cooperation with the Sons of Norway in 1985.

In the first year, there were 78 teams, and in the most recent years, it draws almost 1,200 teams with more than 16,000 athletes from many American states and countries around the world. In 2016, the tournament had teams from five continents. Referees also come from all over the world to help officiate thousands of games.

The tournament is held in July every year in Blaine, Minnesota, at the National Sports Center. The tournament has grown over the years and now includes a Weekend Cup tournament before the weeklong tournament, vendor booths, food trucks, and a huge soccer expo inside the sports hall.

The facility has more than 50 soccer fields, as well as softball fields, indoor ice hockey rinks, and a cycling velodrome.

The main stadium on the campus holds almost 10,000 spectators and was the home of the Minnesota United FC franchise until the team moved from a minor division to Major League Soccer (MLS) in 2017.

In 2022, Charlie Puth performed in the opening ceremony for the weeklong tournament.

== See also ==
- Gothia Cup - Competes with Norway Cup for the largest youth football tournament in the world.
- Norway Cup - For many years the largest youth football tournament in the world.
