= Keith Savage (cricketer) =

Australian cricketer

Personal information
- Born: 19 September 1926; Brisbane, Queensland, Australia
- Died: 18 January 1979 (aged 52); Mount Morgan, Queensland, Australia
- Source: Cricinfo, 6 October 2020

Keith Savage (19 September 1926 – 18 January 1979) was an Australian cricketer. He played in one first-class match for Queensland in 1950/51.

== See also ==
- List of Queensland first-class cricketers
