= J. P. Rodrigues =

Guyanese soccer player

Personal information
- Full name: John Paul Rodrigues
- Date of birth: 29 December 1983 (age 42)
- Place of birth: Lutz, Florida, United States
- Height: 6 ft 1 in (1.85 m)
- Position: Defender

College career
Years	Team	Apps	(Gls)
2002–2005	Belmont Bruins	52	(3)

Senior career*
Years	Team	Apps	(Gls)
2004–2005	Nashville Metros	33	(4)
2006–2009	Miami FC	61	(1)
2007–2008	Orlando Sharks (indoor)	25	(11)
2008–2013	Milwaukee Wave (indoor)	106	(31)
2010	Miami FC	27	(1)
2010	→ D.C. United (loan)	1	(0)
2011–2012	Tampa Bay Rowdies	50	(0)
2013–2014	Rochester Lancers (indoor)	8	(1)
2014	Tampa Bay Rowdies	19	(0)

International career^{‡}
2006–2014	Guyana	23	(0)
- * Club domestic league appearances and goals as of January 26, 2015 ‡ National team caps and goals as of September 25, 2012

John Paul Rodrigues (born December 29, 1983) is a retired Guyanese soccer defender.

== Career ==
=== College and amateur ===
Rodrigues played college soccer at Belmont University, where he was named 1st team All Conference in 2004 & 2005. He was also named Atlantic Sun Conference defender of the year in 2005 and named to the Atlantic Sun 2000's All Decade Team. During his college years he also played with the Nashville Metros in the USL Premier Development League. In 2015 JP Rodrigues was the first Men's soccer player to be inducted into the Belmont University Athletic Hall Of Fame. He has since been joined by his former teammate and Belmont standout Jay Michael Ayres. They are currently the only 2 Men's soccer athletes with this honor.

=== Professional ===
Rodrigues was the first pick of Miami FC in the 2006 USL Draft, and played for the Blues during their first three seasons in the USL First Division before leaving the club at the end of 2009.

On February 18, 2010, Miami FC announced the re-signing of Rodrigues to a new contract for the 2010 season. On October 7, 2010, Rodrigues was signed on a short-term loan by Major League Soccer club D.C. United.

Rodrigues signed with FC Tampa Bay of the North American Soccer League on January 13, 2011. He received a two-year contract with a club option for 2013, although the 2013 option was declined on November 20, 2012.

=== Indoor soccer ===
Rodrigues also has extensive experience of professional indoor soccer, having played in the second MISL for the Orlando Sharks and the third MISL for the Milwaukee Wave. He was voted to the 2007-2008 MISL All Rookie team while with the Sharks After the conclusion of the 2010 USSF Division 2 Professional League season, Rodrigues re-joined Milwaukee Wave for the 2010-11 MISL season. During a Twitter Q&A session on July 31, 2014, Rodrigues announced he had permanently retired from indoor soccer.

=== International ===
Rodrigues made his debut for the Guyana national football team in 2006, and has since amassed 23 caps for the team. He also participated in qualifying matches for the 2010 and 2014 FIFA World Cups. He was a part of the squad that qualified for the final round of the Digicel Caribbean Cup. A Caribbean tournament in which the top 4 teams qualify for the Gold Cup held in the United States. Most recently Rodrigues was a part of the squad that made the World Cup qualifying group stage in which Guyana drew Mexico, Costa Rica and El Salvador.
