= Esteban Bayona =

American-Colombian footballer (born 1983)

Personal information
- Full name: Orlando Esteban Bayona
- Date of birth: November 25, 1983 (age 42)
- Place of birth: Bogotá, Colombia
- Height: 1.83 m (6 ft 0 in)
- Position: Forward

Youth career
- 2006–2008: Incarnate Word Cardinals

Senior career*
Years	Team	Apps	(Gls)
2009–2011	Laredo Heat	39	(35)
2012–2013	San Antonio Scorpions	44	(15)
2014	BÍ/Bolungarvík	8	(6)
- * Club domestic league appearances and goals

Orlando Esteban Bayona (born November 25, 1983) is an American-Colombian former footballer.

== Career ==
=== College and amateur ===
Bayona played his college soccer at the University of the Incarnate Word between 2006 and 2008, where he is ranked 38th all-time in the soccer program history with 38 points (16 goals, 6 assists). He was named UIW offensive player of the year in 2006.

After finishing college, Bayona signed with USL Premier Development League club Laredo Heat, who he played for from 2009 to 2011. As a member of the Laredo Heat Bayona was named to the All-Southern Conference Team. At the conclusion of the 2010 season, Bayona was named Laredo Heat Offensive Player of the Year. In 2011, he was on the PDL's top 3 goal scorers.

=== Professional ===
In March, 2012 Bayona signed his first professional contract with North American Soccer League club San Antonio Scorpions. He later signed with BÍ/Bolungarvík in the Icelandic first division.
