= North American Soccer League Best XI =

The North American Soccer League Best XI was given each season to the eleven players considered to have been the best in their respective positions that year for clubs in the NASL. The award was first given out in 2011, the North American Soccer League's inaugural season.

== Winners ==
=== 2011 ===
Pos.	Player	Club	Appearance
GK	(United States) Brad Knighton	Carolina RailHawks	1
DF	(France) Hassoun Camara	Montreal Impact	1
DF	(Jamaica) Lance Laing	Fort Lauderdale Strikers	1
DF	(Finland) Toni Ståhl	Fort Lauderdale Strikers	1
DF	(United States) Kupono Low	Carolina RailHawks	1
MF	(Haiti) Pascal Millien	FC Tampa Bay	1
MF	(England) Matt Watson	Carolina RailHawks	1
MF	(Canada) Shaun Saiko	FC Edmonton	1
MF	(England) David Foley	Puerto Rico Islanders	1
FW	(United States) Mike Ambersley	FC Tampa Bay	1
FW	(Malta) Etienne Barbara	Carolina Railhawks	1

=== 2012 ===
Pos.	Player	Club	Appearance
GK	(United States) Jeff Attinella	Tampa Bay Rowdies	1
DF	(United States) Kyle Altman	Minnesota Stars	1
DF	(United States) Ryan Cochrane	San Antonio Scorpions	1
DF	(Canada) Paul Hamilton	FC Edmonton	1
DF	(Japan) Takuya Yamada	Tampa Bay Rowdies	1
MF	(England) Luke Mulholland	Tampa Bay Rowdies	1
MF	(Honduras) Walter Ramírez	San Antonio Scorpions	1
MF	(United States) Wálter Restrepo	Fort Lauderdale Strikers	1
MF	(United States) Nick Zimmerman	Carolina RailHawks	1
FW	(England) Mark Anderson	Fort Lauderdale Strikers	1
FW	(Brazil) Pablo Campos	San Antonio Scorpions	1

=== 2013 ===
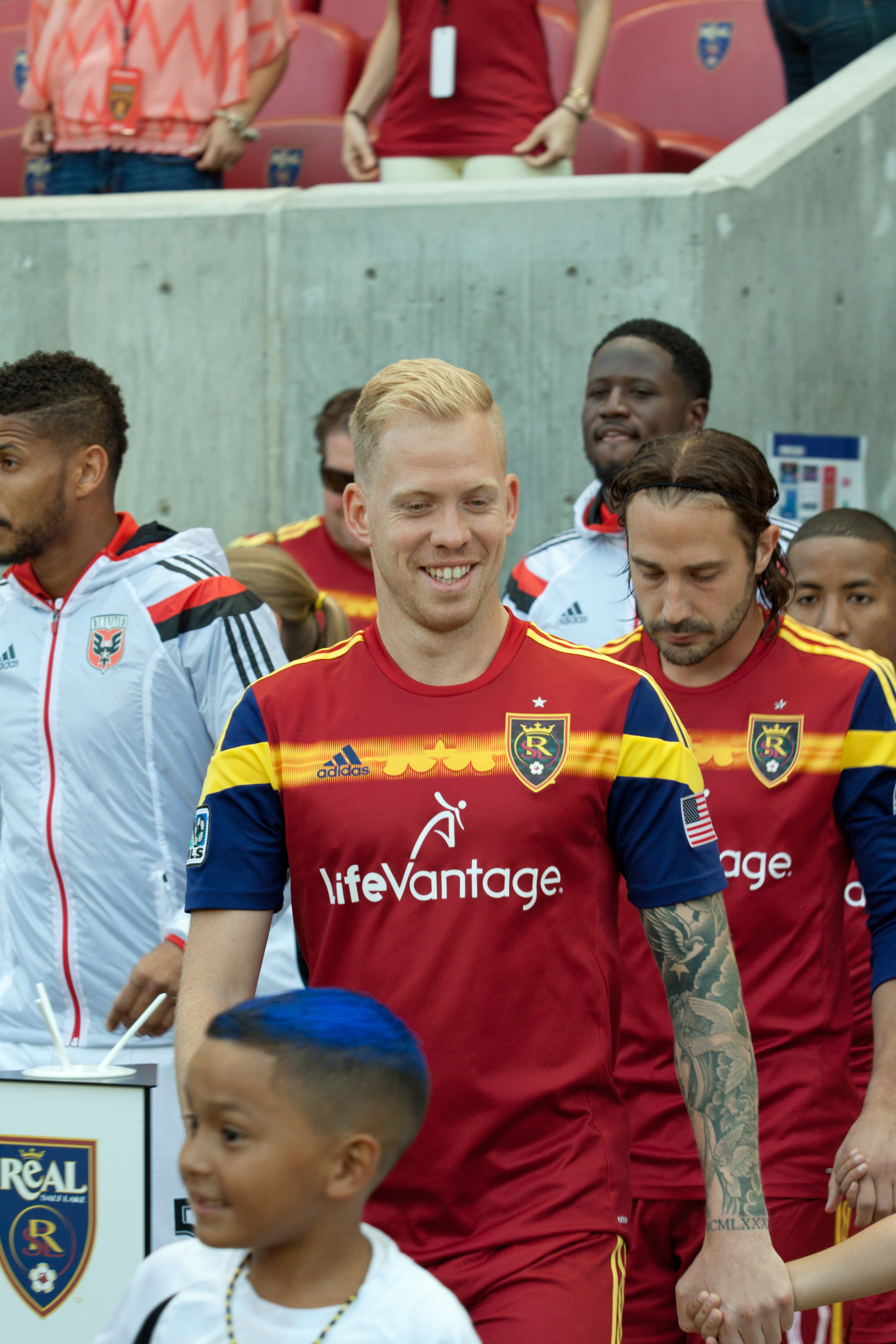
Luke Mulholland was the first plater to twice be nominated in the NASL Best XI, in 2012 and 2013.

Pos.	Player	Club	Appearance
GK	(United States) Joe Nasco	Atlanta Silverbacks	1
DF	(United States) Aaron Pitchkolan	Minnesota United	1
DF	(England) Martyn Lancaster	Atlanta Silverbacks	1
DF	(Northern Ireland) Albert Watson	FC Edmonton	1
MF	(England) Luke Mulholland	Tampa Bay Rowdies	2
MF	(United States) Miguel Ibarra	Minnesota United	1
MF	(El Salvador) Richard Menjivar	Atlanta Silverbacks	1
MF	(Spain) Marcos Senna	New York Cosmos	1
FW	(Bulgaria) Georgi Hristov	Tampa Bay Rowdies	1
FW	(United States) Brian Shriver	Carolina RailHawks	1
FW	(Netherlands) Hans Denissen	San Antonio Scorpions	1

=== 2014 ===
Pos.	Player	Club	Appearance
GK	(United States) Jimmy Maurer	New York Cosmos	1
DF	(United States) Darnell King	Fort Lauderdale Strikers	1
DF	(United States) Carlos Mendes	New York Cosmos	1
DF	(Brazil) Tiago Calvano	Minnesota United	1
DF	(United States) Justin Davis	Minnesota United	1
MF	(United States) Miguel Ibarra	Minnesota United	2
MF	(Colombia) Rafael Castillo	San Antonio Scorpions	1
MF	(United States) Walter Restrepo	San Antonio Scorpions	2
FW	(Jamaica) Lance Laing	FC Edmonton	2
FW	(United States) Fafà Picault	Fort Lauderdale Strikers	1
FW	(United States) Christian Ramirez	Minnesota United	1

=== 2015 ===
Pos.	Player	Club	Appearance
GK	(France) Romuald Peiser	Ottawa Fury	1
DF	(Brazil) Rafael Alves	Ottawa Fury	1
DF	(United States) Justin Davis	Minnesota United	2
DF	(United States) Carlos Mendes	New York Cosmos	2
DF	(United States) Kevin Venegas	Minnesota United	1
MF	(Republic of Ireland) Richie Ryan	Ottawa Fury	1
MF	(Jamaica) Lance Laing	FC Edmonton	3
MF	(Brazil) Ibson	Minnesota United	1
MF	(Haiti) James Marcelin	Fort Lauderdale Strikers	1
FW	(Brazil) Stefano Pinho	Fort Lauderdale Strikers	1
FW	(United States) Christian Ramirez	Minnesota United	2

=== 2016 ===
Pos.	Player	Club	Appearance
GK	(United States) Matt Van Oekel	FC Edmonton	1
DF	(Spain) Ayoze	New York Cosmos	1
DF	(United States) Carlos Mendes	New York Cosmos	3
DF	(United States) Albert Watson	FC Edmonton	1
DF	(United States) Justin Davis	Minnesota United	3
MF	(United States) Nazmi Albadawi	Carolina RailHawks	1
MF	(Venezuela) Juan Arango	New York Cosmos	1
MF	(England) Joe Cole	Tampa Bay Rowdies	1
MF	(Brazil) Michel	Rayo OKC	1
FW	(United States) Christian Ramirez	Minnesota United	3
FW	(Libya) Éamon Zayed	Indy Eleven	1

=== 2017 ===
Pos.	Player	Club	Appearance
GK	(Argentina) Mario Daniel Vega	Miami FC	1
DF	(Brazil) Reiner Ferreira	San Francisco Deltas	1
DF	(Canada) Mason Trafford	Miami FC	1
DF	(Haiti) Mechack Jérôme	Jacksonville Armada	1
DF	(United States) Connor Tobin	North Carolina FC	1
MF	(Argentina) Emmanuel Ledesma	New York Cosmos	1
MF	(United States) Nazmi Albadawi	North Carolina FC	2
MF	(Republic of Ireland) Richie Ryan	Miami FC	2
MF	(United States) Dylan Mares	Miami FC	1
FW	(France) Vincenzo Rennella	Miami FC	1
FW	(Brazil) Stefano Pinho	Miami FC	2

== Statistics ==
=== Performance by club ===
Rank	Club	Apps.
1	Minnesota United	13
2	North Carolina FC	9
3	Fort Lauderdale Strikers	8
3	Tampa Bay Rowdies	8
3	New York Cosmos	8
6	FC Edmonton	7
7	Miami FC	6
7	San Antonio Scorpions	6
9	Atlanta Silverbacks	3
9	Ottawa Fury	3
11	Indy Eleven	1
11	Jacksonville Armada	1
11	Montreal Impact	1
11	Puerto Rico Islanders	1
11	San Francisco Deltas	1
11	Rayo OKC	1

=== Performance by player ===
Multiple winners only.

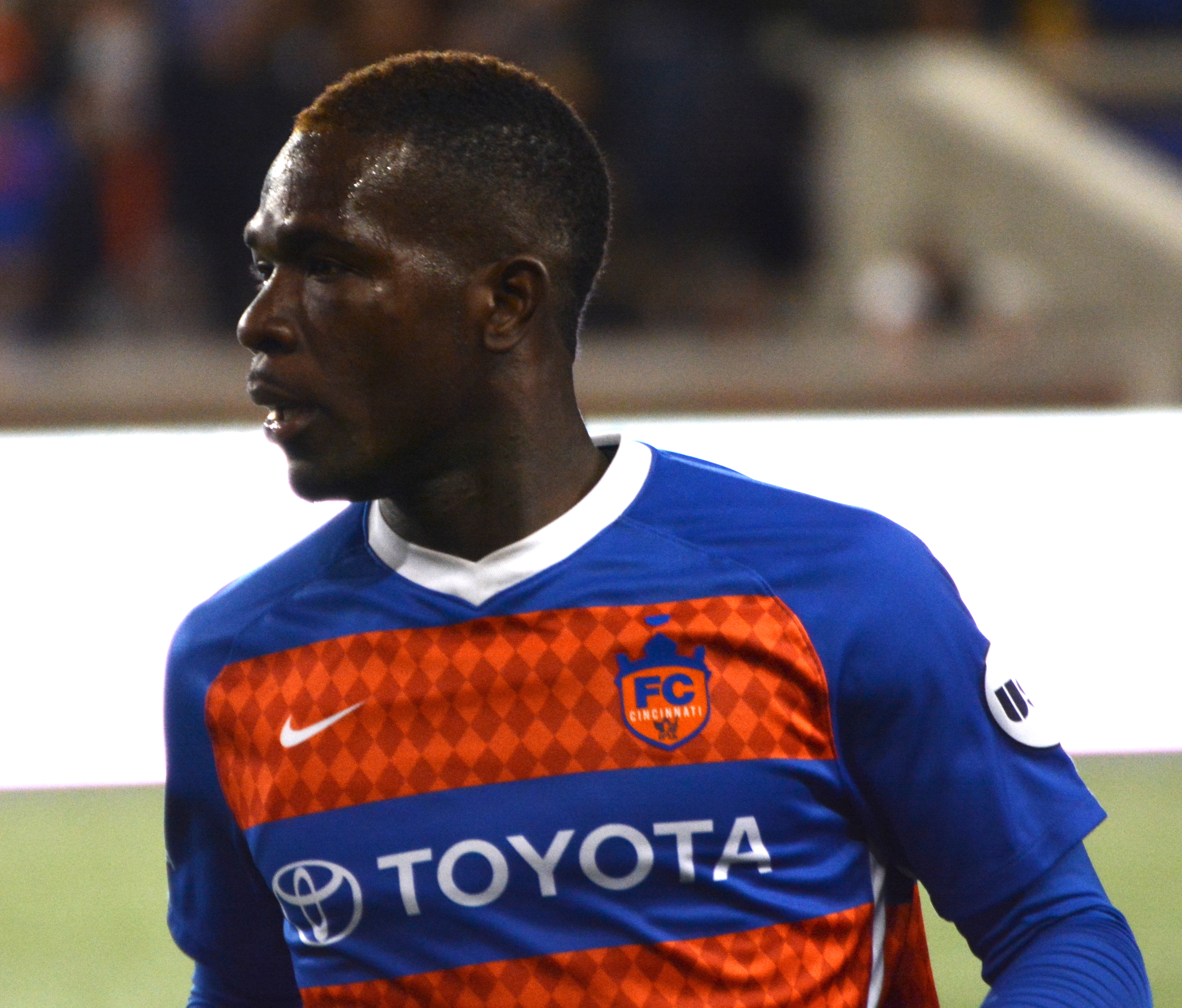
Lance Laing was selected thrice: each time in a different position.

Wins	Player	Years
3	(Jamaica) Lance Laing	2011, 2014, 2015
3	(United States) Carlos Mendes	2014, 2015, 2016
3	(United States) Justin Davis	2014, 2015, 2016
3	(United States) Christian Ramirez	2014, 2015, 2016
2	(England) Luke Mulholland	2012, 2013
2	(United States) Walter Restrepo	2012, 2014
2	(United States) Miguel Ibarra	2014, 2015
2	(Brazil) Stefano Pinho	2015, 2017
2	(Republic of Ireland) Richie Ryan	2015, 2017
2	(United States) Nazmi Albadawi	2016, 2017
