= Jeff Attinella =

American soccer player

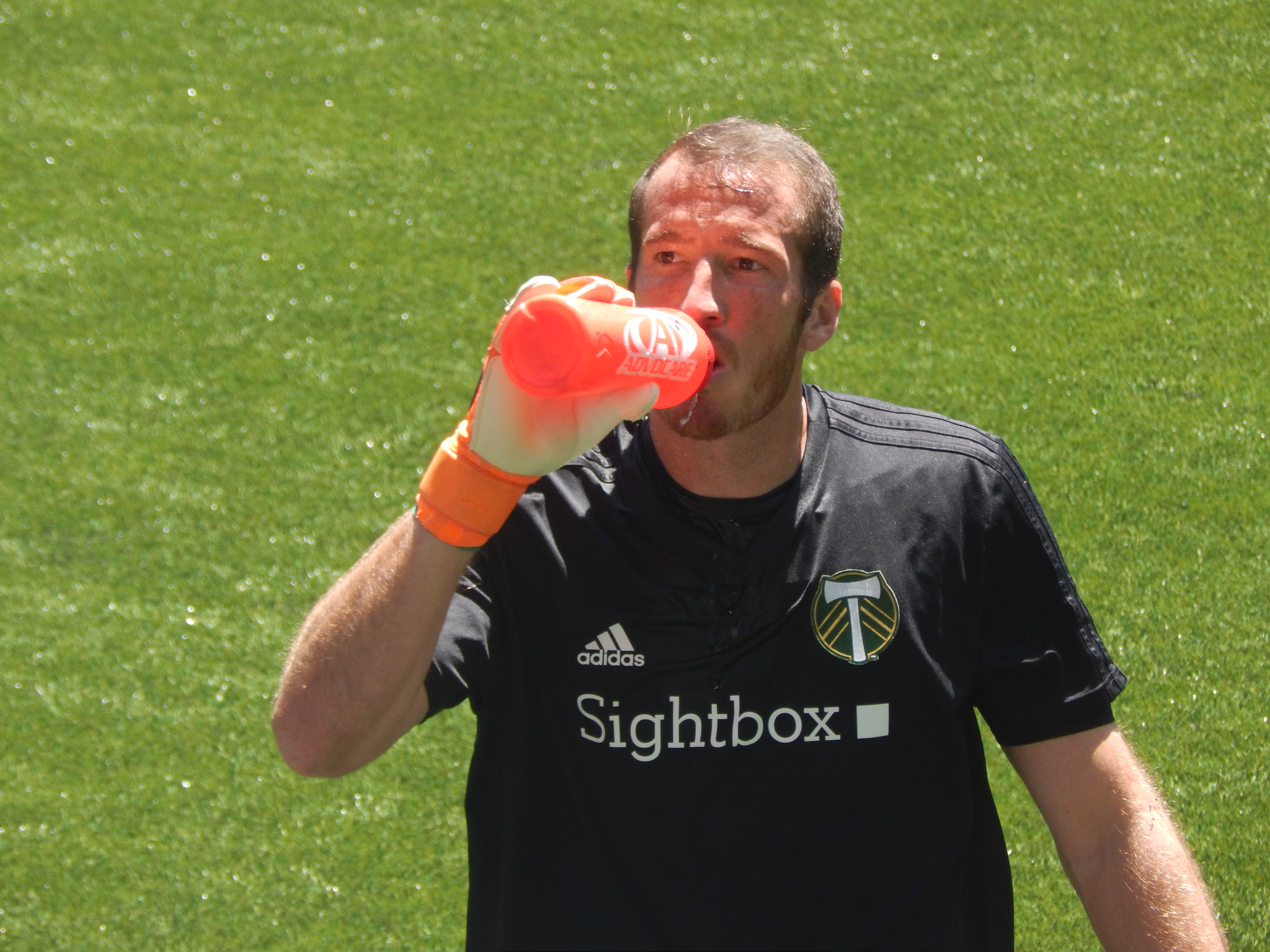
- Attinella with the Portland Timbers in 2018

Personal information
- Date of birth: September 29, 1988 (age 38)
- Place of birth: Clearwater, Florida, United States
- Height: 6 ft 2 in (1.88 m)
- Position: Goalkeeper

College career
Years	Team	Apps	(Gls)
2007–2010	South Florida Bulls	61	(0)

Senior career*
Years	Team	Apps	(Gls)
2009–2010	Bradenton Academics	2	(0)
2011–2012	Tampa Bay Rowdies	52	(0)
2013–2016	Real Salt Lake	29	(0)
2013	→ Fort Lauderdale Strikers (loan)	4	(0)
2016	→ Real Monarchs (loan)	2	(0)
2017–2021	Portland Timbers	50	(0)
2017	Portland Timbers 2	2	(0)
Total		141	(0)
- * Club domestic league appearances and goals as of December 3, 2021

Jeff Attinella (born September 29, 1988) is an American former professional soccer player who previously played as a goalkeeper for Major League Soccer club Portland Timbers.

== Career ==
=== College and amateur ===
Attinella is a product of the University of South Florida where he played between 2007 and 2010. He was awarded NSCAA Third Team All-Region, Hermann Trophy Watch List and Soccer America Preseason All American in 2010, NSCAA First Team All-American, Big East Goalkeeper of the Year and NSCAA All-Region First Team in 2009 and NSCAA All-Region Second Team in 2008.

During his college years, Attinella also played with the Bradenton Academics of the USL Premier Development League.

=== Professional ===
On January 18, 2011, Attinella was drafted in the first round (14th overall) in the 2011 MLS Supplemental Draft by Real Salt Lake, but was released by the club without signing. Attinella signed his first professional contract with FC Tampa Bay on February 22, 2011, and made his professional debut on April 30 against the Atlanta Silverbacks, coming on as a substitute when Tampa's first choice goalkeeper Daryl Sattler suffered an injury.

Tampa Bay picked up the 2012 season option on Attinella's contract on October 4, 2011. The 2012 NASL season proved to be a breakthrough year for Attinella, who played every minute of every match for the Rowdies, won five NASL Defensive Player of the Week awards, one NASL Player of the Month Award, and was named to the 2012 NASL Best XI. Attinella saved three penalties in the Rowdies' NASL Championship victory against Minnesota Stars FC to capture the Soccer Bowl trophy.

Following a successful second season with the Rowdies, Real Salt Lake of MLS announced that they had signed Attinella on December 3, 2012. He made his RSL debut as a second-half sub for an injured Josh Saunders in a 3–0 win against FC Dallas on July 13, earning MLS Save of the Week honors in that very first appearance. He would repeat winning that weekly award on several occasions during his tenure with RSL.

Attinella was selected by Minnesota United FC in the 2016 MLS Expansion Draft and quickly traded to Portland Timbers in exchange for a second-round pick in the 2018 MLS SuperDraft. In mid-2019, Attinella underwent surgery to repair an anterior labrum tear in his right shoulder, which caused him to miss the second half of the 2019 MLS season.

== Personal life ==
Attinella has one daughter and one son with his wife Kendall. Together with his wife and father-in-law, he founded a publishing company called "It Had to Be Told" to publish Attinella's children books that he describes as "nursery rhymes with a sports emphasis". In May 2020, Attinella and his publishing company donated 1,000 copies of his book "The Curse Ends: The Story of the 2016 Chicago Cubs" to a Chicago non-profit that provides low-income and homeless families with essential educational items.

== Honors ==
Tampa Bay Rowdies

- North American Soccer League (1): 2012

Real Salt Lake

- Major League Soccer Western Conference Championship (1): 2013

Portland Timbers

- Major League Soccer Western Conference Championship (1): 2018
- MLS is Back Tournament: 2020
