= Floyd Franks =

American soccer player (born 1984)

Personal information
- Date of birth: April 5, 1984 (age 42)
- Place of birth: Vestavia Hills, Alabama, United States
- Height: 1.80 m (5 ft 11 in)
- Position: Midfielder

Youth career
- 2002–2005: Charlotte 49ers

Senior career*
Years	Team	Apps	(Gls)
2005	Carolina Dynamo	10	(1)
2006–2007	Chicago Fire	16	(1)
2008	Cleveland City Stars	17	(2)
2008–2009	Blokhus	33	(4)
2010–2011	Carolina RailHawks	50	(2)
2012	Vancouver Whitecaps FC	2	(0)
2012–2013	Carolina RailHawks	21	(3)
2013–2014	Minnesota United	23	(1)
- * Club domestic league appearances and goals as of December 13, 2014

Floyd Franks (born April 5, 1984) is an American soccer player.

== Career ==
=== College and amateur ===
Franks attended Vestavia Hills High School and played four years of college soccer at the University of North Carolina at Charlotte, finishing his career with 18 goals and 15 assists in 71 matches. He two-time all-Conference USA selection after his sophomore and junior seasons and an all-Atlantic 10 Conference selection after his senior season.

During his college years Franks also played with Carolina Dynamo in the USL Premier Development League.

=== Professional ===
Franks was selected in the first round (10th overall) of the 2006 MLS Supplemental Draft by Chicago Fire; he scored his first career professional goal on July 29, 2007, against Toronto FC.

After being released by Chicago at the end of the 2007 season, Franks signed with Cleveland City Stars in April 2008, and spent a year playing in the USL Second Division before moving to Denmark to play with Blokhus in the fully amateur Danish 2nd Division West. He played 33 games and scored 4 goals for the Danes before leaving at the end of the 2008/09 season.

On February 15, 2010, the Carolina RailHawks announced that they had signed him for the 2010 season.

Franks was signed by Vancouver Whitecaps FC of Major League Soccer on March 6, 2012 and waived on June 28. He later returned to the RailHawks. On July 25, 2013, Midway through the 2012, Franks was traded by the RailHawks to the Minnesota United FC.
