= Justin Davis (soccer) =

American soccer player (born 1988)

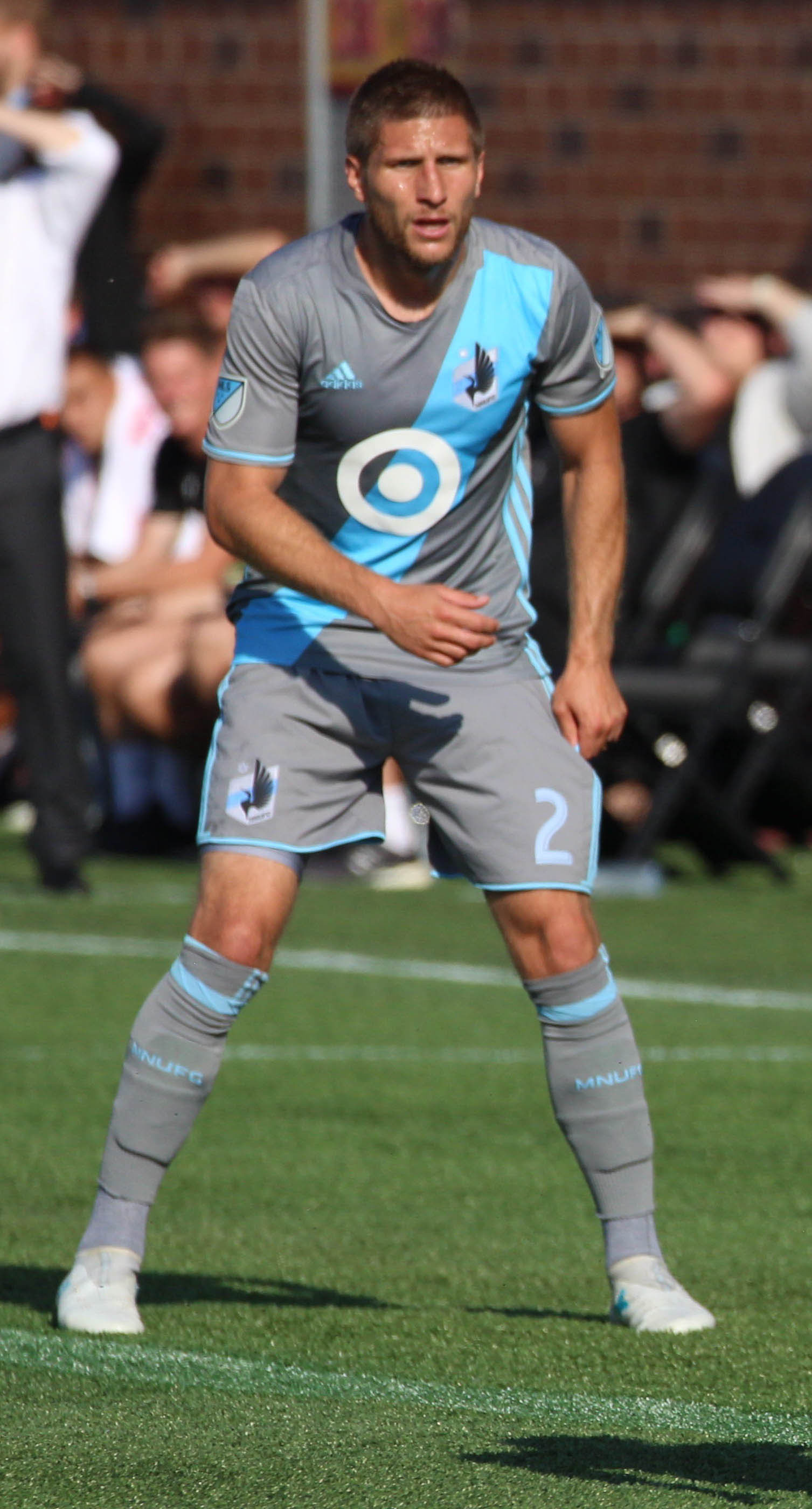
- Justin Davis playing for Minnesota United FC in 2017

Personal information
- Full name: Justin Davis
- Date of birth: May 6, 1988 (age 38)
- Place of birth: Southfield, Michigan, United States
- Height: 6 ft 0 in (1.83 m)
- Position: Fullback

College career
Years	Team	Apps	(Gls)
2006–2009	New Mexico Lobos		

Senior career*
Years	Team	Apps	(Gls)
2007–2008	Des Moines Menace	11	(3)
2011–2016	Minnesota United	163	(9)
2017	Minnesota United	8	(0)
2018–2019	Nashville SC	54	(1)
- * Club domestic league appearances and goals as of October 23, 2019

Justin Davis (born May 6, 1988) is an American former professional soccer player.

== Career ==
=== College and amateur ===
Davis was born in Commerce, Michigan. He played his college career at the University of New Mexico where he played mainly as a forward, but was noted for his versatility. Davis led the MPSF in scoring while earning first team all-MPSF accolades. He also earned second team all-Far West Region honors.

During his college years Davis also played for Des Moines Menace in the USL Premier Development League.

=== Professional ===
Davis was drafted in the second round (32nd overall) of the 2010 MLS SuperDraft by Real Salt Lake, but was not offered a contract by the team. He signed with the NSC Minnesota Stars in the North American Soccer League in 2011, and made his professional debut on April 30, in a 1–1 tie with the Carolina RailHawks. He scored his first professional goal on May 18, in a 2–0 win over the Puerto Rico Islanders.

Minnesota announced in December 2011 that Davis would return for the 2012 season.

Nashville SC announced on January 4, 2018, that Davis had signed for Nashville's inaugural United Soccer League season, along with Michael DeGraffenreidt, Josh Hughes and Bolu Akinyode. Nashville was selected two weeks earlier to join Major League Soccer (MLS) in either 2019 or 2020.

== Career statistics ==
As of June 22, 2017

Club	League	Season	League		MLS Cup		US Open Cup		CONCACAF		Total	
Club	League	Season	Apps	Goals	Apps	Goals	Apps	Goals	Apps	Goals	Apps	Goals
NSC Minnesota Stars	NASL	2011	28	1	–	–	0	0	–	–	28	1
Minnesota Stars	NASL	2012	29	1	–	–	2	0	–	–	31	1
Minnesota United FC	NASL	2013	19	0	–	–	0	0	–	–	19	0
Minnesota United FC	NASL	2014	26	1	–	–	1	0	–	–	27	1
Minnesota United FC	NASL	2015	30	5	–	–	0	0	–	–	30	5
Minnesota United FC	NASL	2016	31	1	–	–	2	0	–	–	33	1
Minnesota United FC	MLS	2017	5	0	–	–	1	0	–	–	6	0
Career total			168	9	–	–	6	0	–	–	174	9
