= Dan Antoniuk =

American soccer player

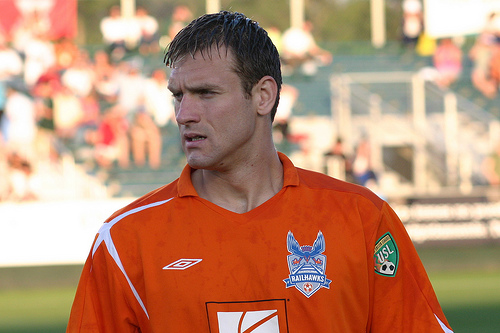

Personal information
- Full name: Daniel Antoniuk
- Date of birth: January 23, 1981 (age 45)
- Place of birth: Philadelphia, Pennsylvania, United States
- Height: 6 ft 3 in (1.91 m)
- Position: Forward

College career
Years	Team	Apps	(Gls)
1998–2002	Wheaton Lyons	66	(54)

Senior career*
Years	Team	Apps	(Gls)
2003–2005	Portland Timbers	61	(17)
2003	Milwaukee Wave (indoor)	3	(0)
2003–2005	San Diego Sockers (indoor)	18	(3)
2005	Philadelphia KiXX (indoor)	17	(3)
2006	Montreal Impact	19	(3)
2007	Atlanta Silverbacks	26	(7)
2007–2008	New Jersey Ironmen (indoor)	23	(39)
2008	Carolina RailHawks	30	(3)
2009	Chicago Storm (indoor)	9	(7)
2009	Charleston Battery	24	(3)
2009–2012	San Diego Sockers (indoor)	38	(28)
2010	San Diego Boca		
2011	FC Edmonton	23	(3)
2012	Tampa Bay Rowdies	25	(9)
2013–2014	St. Louis Ambush (indoor)	17	(7)
2014	FC Tucson	4	(0)
2014–2015	San Diego Sockers (indoor)	19	(8)
2015–2020	Tacoma Stars (indoor)	72	(37)
- * Club domestic league appearances and goals as of 22 January 2022

Daniel Antoniuk (born January 23, 1981, in Philadelphia, Pennsylvania) is an American soccer player who last played for the Tacoma Stars in the Major Arena Soccer League.

== Career ==
=== College ===
Antoniuk attended Wheaton College, playing on the men's soccer team from 1999 to 2002. He holds the school record for career goals (54) and points (144) and was a 1999 NCAA Division III Third Team All American.

=== Professional ===
In the spring of 2003, Antoniuk signed with the Portland Timbers of the USL A-League/First Division. He spent three seasons in Portland, his most productive coming in 2005 when he scored thirteen goals in twenty-four games. Antoniuk was selected to the USL Starting Eleven All-star Team. Following the 2005 season, Antoniuk became a free agent and signed with the Vancouver Whitecaps on February 1, 2006. The Vancouvers then traded Antoniuk to the Montreal Impact for Eduardo Sebrango on March 28. He spent the 2006 season with Montreal, scoring only three goals in nineteen games, most coming off the bench. Antoniuk asked for a trade and was traded to the Atlanta Silverbacks for Fabian Dawkins and Jason McLaughlin. In 2007, he led the USL-1 in points, scoring seven goals and adding a league leading nine assists, as the Silverbacks went to the USL-1 championship game. Antoniuk was again selected to USL Starting Eleven All-Star Team.

On November 7, 2007, the Carolina RailHawks signed Antoniuk for the 2008 season. He scored his first goal with the RailHawks in a 1–0 victory at Miami FC on May 4, 2008. He played in twenty-eight regular season games with the RailHawks, but was injured for most of the season and managed only three goals. On April 3, 2009, he signed with the Charleston Battery of the USL First Division. In June 2010, he moved to San Diego Boca of the National Premier Soccer League. Antoniuk signed with FC Edmonton of the North American Soccer League (NASL) on March 16, 2011., scoring four goals and adding four assists for the club . The club declined to pick up his option for a second year after the conclusion of the 2011 season.

He signed with Tampa Bay Rowdies of the NASL on January 31, 2012. He went on lead the Rowdies with nine goals while notching four assists, on the way to helping the Rowdies win the NASL Championship. In the semi-final game, Antoniuk scored the game winner in the 85th minute against the Carolina Railhawks. In the championship against the Minnesota Stars, he scored in the 86th minute to tie the aggregate score between the two teams, sending the game to a penalty shootout in which the Rowdies prevailed.

While playing outdoor soccer professionally for 10 seasons, Antoniuk has also played 8 seasons of professional indoor soccer in the MISL and PASL. The indoor season is played in the 4 months over the winter, and barely overlaps with the outdoor leagues.

=== Indoor soccer ===
On October 31, 2003, Antoniuk signed, with the permission of the Portland Timbers, a two-year contract with the Milwaukee Wave of Major Indoor Soccer League (MISL). He played only three games with the Wave before being traded to the San Diego Sockers, where he scored two goals in eight games. The Sockers folded during the 2004–2005 season and the Philadelphia KiXX selected Antoniuk in the first round of the dispersal draft, held January 5, 2005. Antoniuk signed with the KiXX on January 28, 2005.

In the fall of 2007, after a 2-year break, Antoniuk returned to the indoor circuit with the New Jersey Ironmen of MISL. On February 20, 2009, he moved to the Chicago Storm of the Xtreme Soccer League, and played 9 games for them during the 2009 XSL season. In the fall of 2009, he signed with the San Diego Sockers of the Professional Arena Soccer League. He played four seasons with the San Diego Sockers, from 2009 to 2012, winning the PASL Championship each year. On November 10, 2013, he signed with the St. Louis Ambush of the MISL for their inaugural season.
