= Lucas Rodríguez (footballer, born 1986) =

Argentine footballer

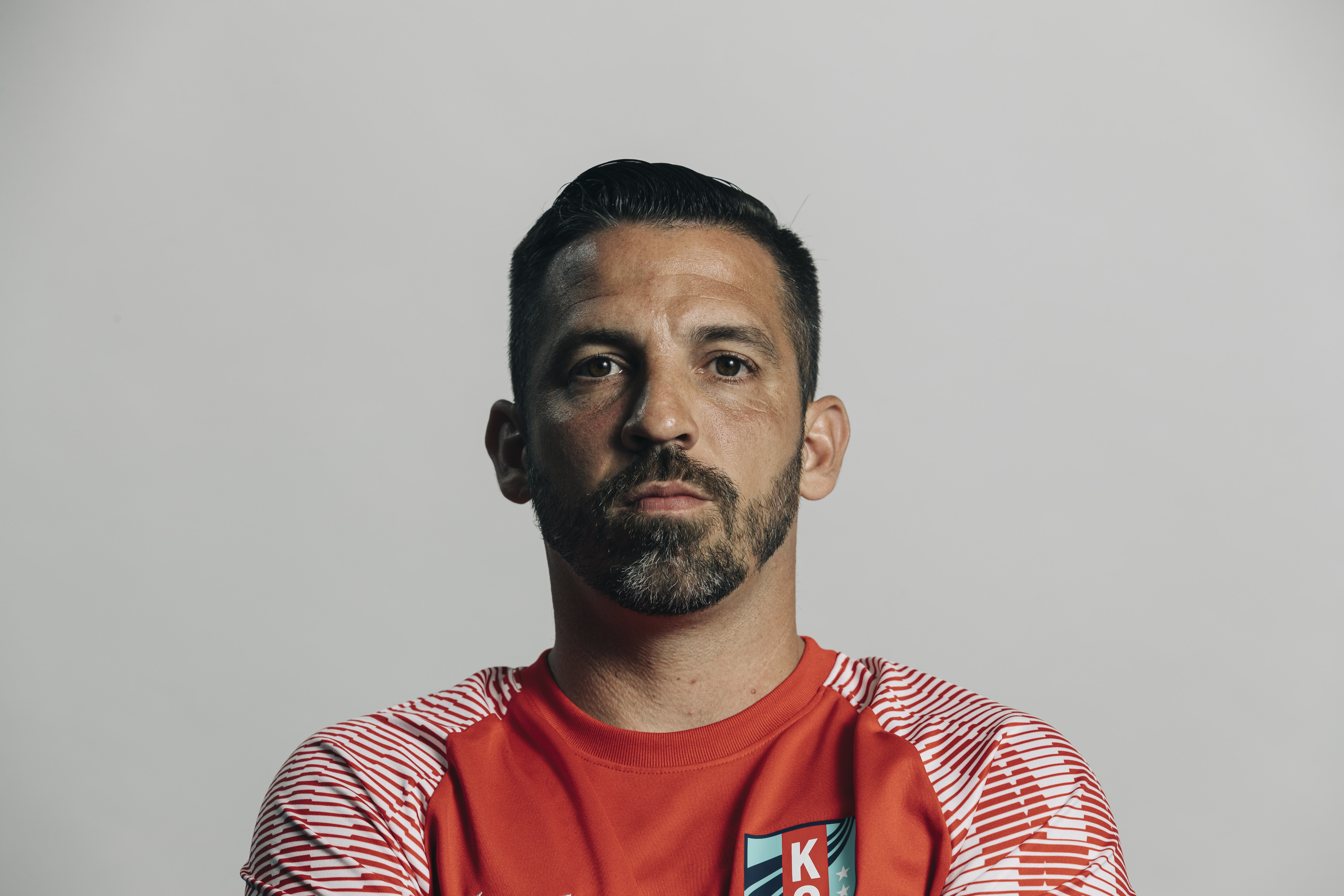
- Rodríguez with the Kansas City Current in 2025

Personal information
- Full name: Lucas Rodríguez
- Date of birth: February 8, 1986 (age 40)
- Place of birth: Buenos Aires, Argentina
- Height: 1.73 m (5 ft 8 in)
- Position: Midfielder

Youth career
- 1998–2006: KC Pace

College career
Years	Team	Apps	(Gls)
2006–2007	Johnson County Cavaliers		
2008–2009	MidAmerica Nazarene Pioneers		

Senior career*
Years	Team	Apps	(Gls)
2008–2009	Kansas City Brass	12	(2)
2010–2013	Minnesota United FC	61	(7)
2010–2020	Kansas City Comets	182	(114)
2015	Jacksonville Armada FC	18	(0)

Managerial career
- 2021–: Kansas City Current (assistant)
- * Club domestic league appearances and goals as of 7 April 2020

Lucas Rodríguez (born February 8, 1986, in Buenos Aires) is an Argentine former professional footballer who is currently an assistant coach with the Kansas City Current in the National Women's Soccer League.

== Career ==
=== College and amateur ===
Rodríguez spent his early childhood up in his native Argentina, before coming to the United States when he was 14 years old, settling in Lenexa, Kansas, and played in this time for the KC Pace soccer club. He attended Shawnee Mission Northwest High School, and after attending Johnson County Community College for two years, moved to MidAmerica Nazarene University in Olathe, Kansas. He played two more years of college soccer at Mid America Nazarene, where in his senior year Rodríguez led his team to the Heart of America Athletic Conference championship while being named the most valuable player, and garnering first- and third-team All-America honors.

During his college years Rodríguez also played with Kansas City Brass in the USL Premier Development League.

=== Professional ===
Undrafted out of college, Rodríguez signed his first professional contract in 2010 when he was signed by the NSC Minnesota Stars of the USSF Division 2 Professional League in May. He made his professional debut on July 14, 2010, in a game against AC St. Louis, and scored his first professional goal on September 24, 2010, in Minnesota's last regular season game of the 2010 season, a 3–1 win over FC Tampa Bay.

Rodríguez signed with the Kansas City Comets of the Major Indoor Soccer League (MISL) for the 2010–2011 season. He played in 17 games scoring six goals and seven assists. His play was good enough to earn him the MISL Rookie of the Year award.

He signed with Jacksonville Armada FC on October 23, 2014. Rodriguez was released by Jacksonville in November 2015.

Rodríguez returned to the Kansas City Comets of the new Major Arena Soccer League (MASL) for the 2016–17 season. He announced his retirement in December 2020.

=== Coaching ===
Rodríguez joined the coaching staff of National Women's Soccer League club Kansas City Current in January 2021, ahead of their inaugural season. He was retained by the Current for the 2022 NWSL season.
