= Luke Mulholland =

English footballer

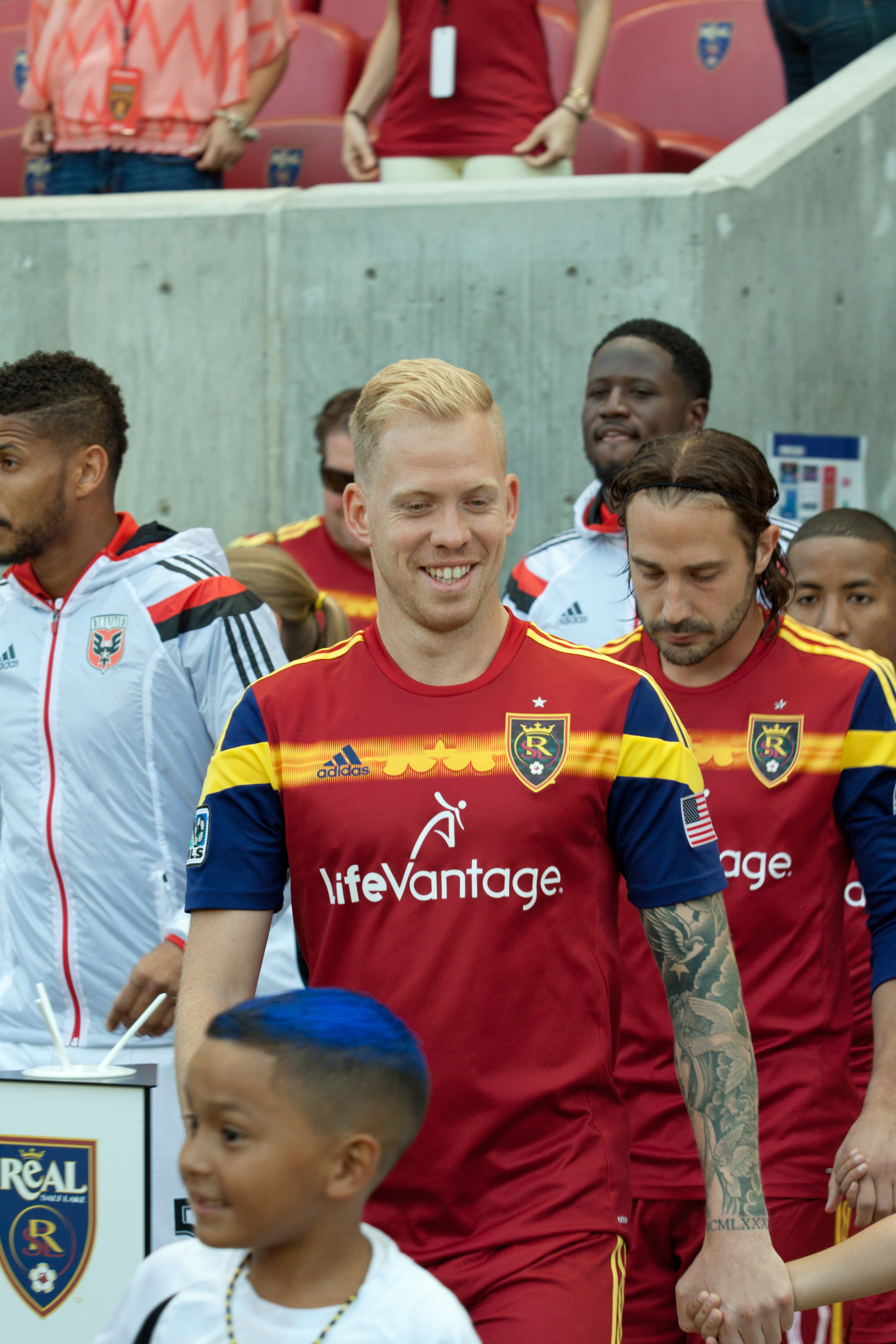
- Mulholland lining up onto the field against DC United with Real Salt Lake in 2014.

Personal information
- Date of birth: 7 August 1988 (age 38)
- Place of birth: Preston, England
- Position: Attacking midfielder

Youth career
- 2006–2007: Lancaster City

College career
Years	Team	Apps	(Gls)
2007–2010	Wingate Bulldogs	73	(37)

Senior career*
Years	Team	Apps	(Gls)
2009–2010	Reading United	30	(8)
2011	Wilmington Hammerheads	23	(9)
2011	NSC Minnesota Stars	7	(2)
2012–2013	Tampa Bay Rowdies	53	(15)
2014–2020	Real Salt Lake	123	(16)
2016–2020	Real Monarchs	15	(1)
Total		251	(51)
- * Club domestic league appearances and goals as of 5 October 2020

Luke Mulholland (born 7 August 1988) is an English former footballer and current scout for Real Salt Lake in Major League Soccer.

== Career ==
=== College and amateur ===
Mulholland began his career with English non-league side Lancaster City. He was thrown into the team as a youngster due to the club's financial difficulties but starred during a difficult period for the club. Mulholland played his college career at Wingate University from 2007 to 2010. In 2009 Mulholland was named First Team All-American and SAC Conference Player of the Year. Mulholland was assisted by teammates Jamie McKenna and Stephen Kehoe to develop his skills.

During his college career, Mulholland also played with USL Premier Development League club Reading United during their 2009 and 2010 seasons.

During Luke Mulholland's college career, he also coached the U16 club team of North Carolina–based Waxhaw United SC.

=== Professional ===
Mulholland signed his first professional contract in April 2011, joining third division USL Pro club Wilmington Hammerheads. He made his professional debut – and scored his first professional goal – on 17 April 2011 in Wilmington's first game of the 2011 season, a 1–0 win over the Rochester Rhinos. Mulholland's standout first season earned him recognition as the USL Pro Rookie of the Year and he was also named to the league's 2011 Best XI squad.

After the close of the 2011 USL Pro season, Mulholland became a late-season addition to the NSC Minnesota Stars of the second division North American Soccer League on 6 September 2011. His form and goals helped the team to win the NASL Championship. Mulholland scored the game winner in the 53rd minute of the first leg the final against the Fort Lauderdale Strikers and he was named Finals MVP.

On 24 January 2012, the second division Tampa Bay Rowdies announced the signing of Mulholland. The year was another one of great success for him, being named to the NASL's Best XI in 2012. Mulholland scored the game-winning goal versus the Carolina Railhawks in the NASL Semi-finals, which sent the Rowdies into the NASL Finals against his former club, the Minnesota Stars. The Rowdies went on to win the 2012 championship on penalties, 3–2, with Mulholland converting the first attempt of the shoot-out. In two years at Tampa Bay, Mulholland registered 17 goals and 13 assists in 51 league appearances and became the first player to be named to the NASL's Best XI in back-to-back seasons.

Luke Mulholland last played for first division MLS side, Real Salt Lake. In his first season of MLS he appeared in 31 matches for RSL, starting 24 of them. He scored six goals and added seven assists. He also started both of RSL playoff matches.

On 16 February 2021, Mulholland announced his retirement from professional soccer.

== Personal ==
Mulholland was born and raised in Preston, England. In December 2014, he received a U.S. green card which qualifies him as a domestic player for MLS roster purposes.

== Honors ==
NASL Championships: (2)

- 2011 (Minnesota)
- 2012 (Tampa Bay)

=== Individual ===
- USL Pro: Rookie of the Year – 2011
- USL Pro: Best XI – 2011
- Soccer Bowl MVP – 2011
- NASL Best XI – 2012, 2013
- NASL Player of the Month – October 2013
- NASL Player of the Month – April 2013
