= Mike Ambersley =

American soccer player

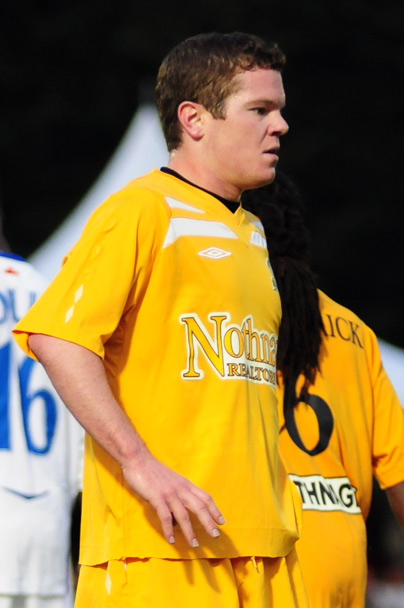

Personal information
- Full name: Michael Ambersley
- Date of birth: February 14, 1983 (age 43)
- Place of birth: St. Louis, Missouri, United States
- Height: 5 ft 9 in (1.75 m)
- Position: Forward

Youth career
- 2001–2005: Indiana Hoosiers

Senior career*
Years	Team	Apps	(Gls)
2002	Chicago Fire Premier	5	(4)
2004	St. Louis Strikers	11	(3)
2006	FC Dallas	0	(0)
2006–2007	Rochester Raging Rhinos	36	(3)
2008	Atlanta Silverbacks	0	(0)
2009	Rochester Rhinos	18	(2)
2010	AC St. Louis	23	(9)
2011–2013	Tampa Bay Rowdies	60	(19)
2013	Minnesota United	13	(0)
2014	Indy Eleven	26	(6)
2015–2016	Saint Louis FC	50	(6)
Total		240	(54)

International career^{‡}
2002	United States U20	4	(0)
- * Club domestic league appearances and goals as of October 9, 2016 ‡ National team caps and goals as of October 5, 2012

Mike Ambersley (born February 14, 1983) is an American former professional soccer player who played as a striker. The last club he played for was Saint Louis FC in the United Soccer League.

== Career ==
=== College and amateur ===
Ambersley attended De Smet Jesuit High School where he was a NSCAA and Parade Magazine High School All American soccer player and the 2000 Missouri Player of the Year. He attended Indiana University where he played soccer from 2001 to 2005. He played for the Under 20 U.S. National Team from 2001 to 2002. Ambersley was on the roster during trips to Mexico, the Netherlands, and Spain. He suffered a back injury his sophomore year and redshirted the 2003 season. In 2002, he played for the Chicago Fire Premier of the Premier Development League during the collegiate off season. Ambersley started 82 of 86 games during his college career at Indiana where he scored 18 goals and 20 assists. He played in two Final Fours while at Indiana scoring 2 goals and adding 2 assists in 4 games. Ambersley scored the game winning penalty kick in the 2004 National Championship game.

=== Professional ===
On January 20, 2006, FC Dallas selected Ambersley in the 4th round (43rd overall) in the 2006 MLS SuperDraft. He never played a game with Dallas before being released at the end of April 2006.

On March 8, 2006, the Chicago Storm of the Major Indoor Soccer League selected Ambersley in the third round of the 2006 MISL College Draft. However, he did not sign with the Storm. Instead, he joined the Rochester Rhinos of the USL First Division. On November 28, 2007, signed a three-year contract with the Atlanta Silverbacks of USL-1. He injured his knee during the pre-season and lost the entire season. The Silverbacks withdrew from the league at the end of the season and Ambersley returned to Rochester for the 2009 season.

In March 2010, Ambersley joined AC St. Louis of the USSF Division 2 Professional League. He scored 9 goals in league play and 11 overall. 2 of those goals coming in the US Open Cup, both of which were game winners. After the demise of AC St. Louis, Ambersley signed with FC Tampa Bay of the North American Soccer League on January 4, 2011. He spent the entire 2011 season with Tampa Bay and led the team in every major statistical category while being named to the NASL Best XI Team. On October 4, 2011, the club picked up his 2012 season option.

Ambersley signed a contract extension with Tampa Bay through the 2014 season in February 2012. On August 1, 2013, Ambersley was traded to Minnesota United in exchange for forward Etienne Barbara.

On January 22, 2014, Ambersley signed with to new NASL franchise Indy Eleven.

On January 13, 2015, Ambersley became the first ever signing for new USL Pro franchise Saint Louis FC.

On January 13, 2017, Ambersley announced his retirement from professional soccer.

== Honors ==
=== Tampa Bay Rowdies ===
- North American Soccer League:
  - Champion (1): 2012
  - NASL Best XI: 2011

=== Indiana University ===
- NCAA Men's Division I Soccer Championship (1): 2004
