= National Sports Center =

Multi-sport complex in Blaine, Minnesota, United States

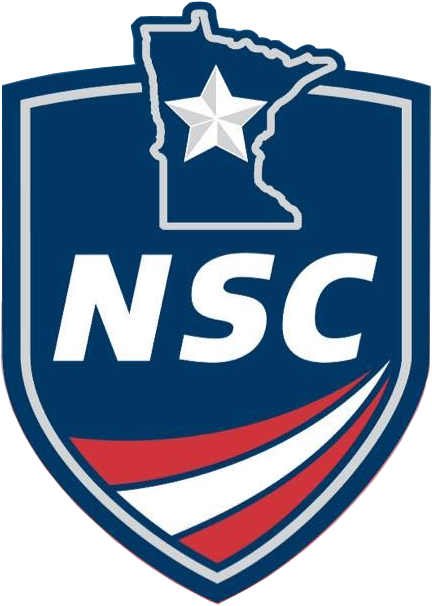

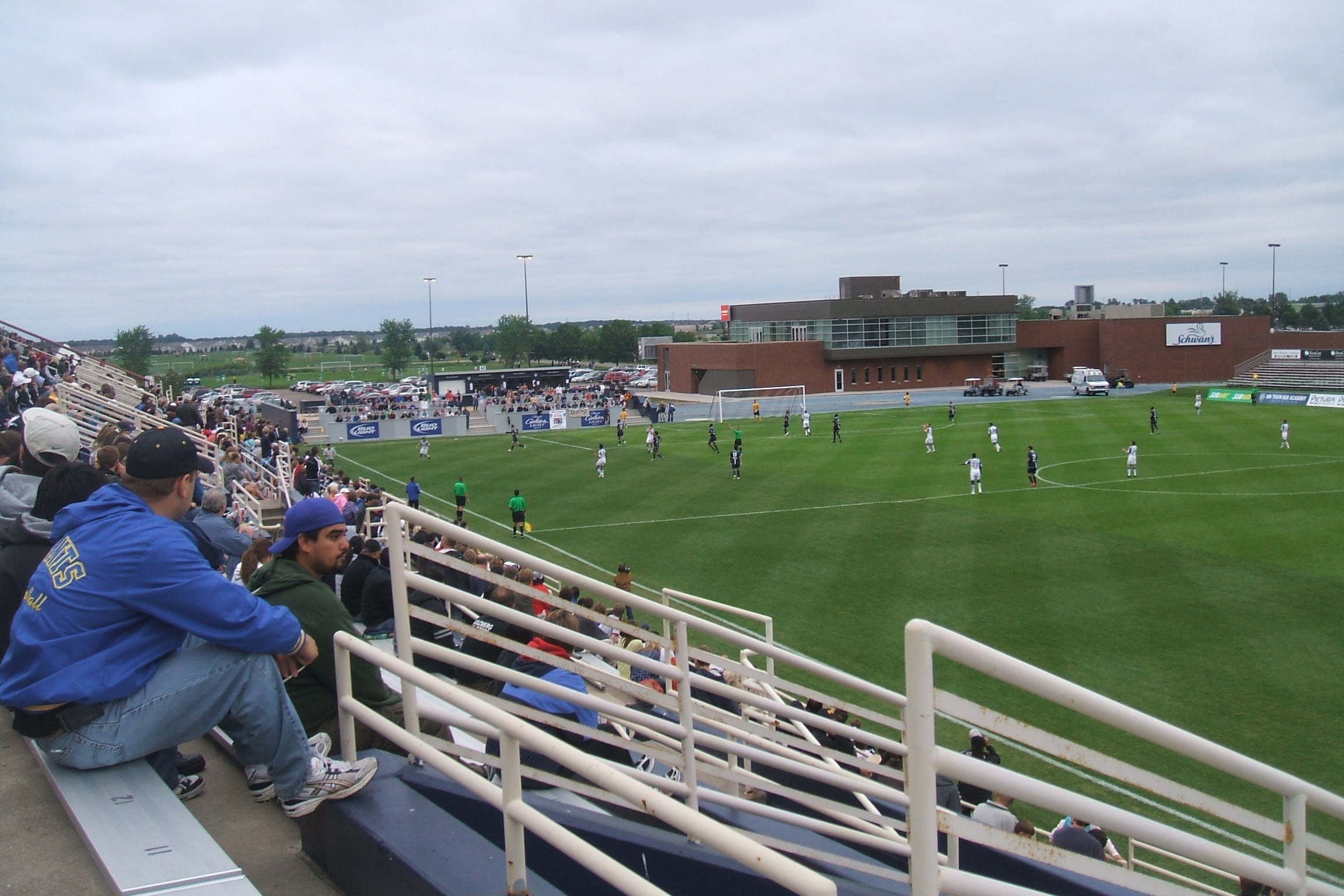
- Soccer match at the complex in 2009
- Interactive map of National Sports Center
- Address: Blaine, Minnesota; United States
- Coordinates: 45°09′27″N 93°13′33.33″W
- Owner: State of Minnesota
- Operator: National Sports Center Foundation
- Capacity: 5,500
- Type: Sports complex
- Surface: Natural grass
- Current use: Ice hockey; Soccer; Golf

Construction
- Groundbreaking: 1987 (money appropriated)
- Opened: 1990; 36 years ago
- Cost: $20.3 million (facility)
- Architect: none

Tenants
- Minnesota Thunder (USISL/A-League/USL-1) (1990–2003, 2008–2009); Minnesota United FC (NASL) (2010–2016); Minnesota Wind Chill (AUDL) (2013–2021); Minnesota United FC 2 (MLSNP) (2022–present)

Website
- nscsports.org

The National Sports Center (NSC) is a sport complex located in Blaine, Minnesota. Its 600-acre (240 ha) site includes a soccer stadium, over 50 full-sized soccer fields, a golf course, a meeting and convention facility, an eight-sheet ice rink, and a baseball stadium currently under construction. The National Sports Center has hosted numerous National and World Championship events in soccer, hockey, figure skating, short track speedskating, broomball, rugby, ultimate frisbee and lacrosse. The National Sports Center opened in 1990 after 1987 legislature created the Minnesota Amateur Sports Commission (MASC) and appropriated $14.7 million for the construction of the NSC. The facility has over 3.8 million visitors annually, making it the most-visited sports facility in the state of Minnesota.

The Herb Brooks Foundation, the foundation created by the hockey coach's family, has partnered with the National Sports Center to develop the Herb Brooks Training Center, a dryland and ice hockey training facility that is part of the Super Rink.

Each July, the National Sports Center plays host to USA Cup, the largest soccer tournament in the Western Hemisphere with over 1,100 teams and participants from 19 countries.

== Mission and governance ==
The mission of the National Sports Center is two-fold: 1) to create out-of-state economic impact for Minnesota through amateur sports events, and 2) to create sports and fitness opportunities for Minnesota residents. The NSC is operated by the National Sports Center Foundation, a 501(c)(3) non-profit corporation. Even though the facility is a State of Minnesota facility, and operations are overseen by the MASC, the NSC receives no operating subsidy from the state, and it is a self-supporting operation.

== History ==
The state legislature approved $14.7 million in funding for the sports complex in 1987. Following the successful U.S. bid for the 1994 FIFA World Cup, civic boosters in the Twin Cities proposed staging matches at the Blaine sports complex with a temporary arrangement to seat 45,000 spectators, but were not named in the final list of venues.

== NSC Stadium ==
The NSC Stadium has a large grandstand along the west sideline of the field and smaller grandstands on the opposite sideline and on either end. The United States women's national soccer team has played four home matches at the NSC, including international matches against Canada, Australia, Norway and Sweden. Mia Hamm scored her 150th international goal at the NSC in a 3–0 victory over Australia in 2004. The NSC has also hosted men's U.S. national team U-17 and U-20 matches. The largest crowd in NSC history was for a 2001 women's soccer match between the United States and Canada, when 15,615 fans watched a 1–0 U.S. victory. The playing field is 118x75 yards.

The NSC played host to the now-defunct Minnesota Thunder of the USL First Division. The stadium served as the Thunder's home from 1990 to 2003 and from May 24, 2008, until the end of the 2009 season when the team folded.

For the 2010 season the NSC Minnesota Stars (now Minnesota United FC) were founded to replace the Minnesota Thunder in the North American Soccer League, and the Stars played their home games at the stadium. The Stars were the champions of the inaugural season of the re-instituted North American Soccer League. Minnesota United FC used the stadium as their home ground until they moved to TCF Bank Stadium after joining Major League Soccer in 2017.

The NSC has hosted KTIS-FM's Joyful Noise Family Fest every year of its existence until 2022 when the festival was put on an indefinite hiatus.

== Schwan Super Rink ==
National Sports Center Super Rink
- Location: Blaine, Minnesota
- Surface: Rinks #1–4: 200 ft × 98 ft (61 m × 30 m); Rinks #5–8: 200 ft × 85 ft (61 m × 26 m)

Construction
- Opened: 1998
- Expanded: 2006
- Cost: $21 million
- Architect: Rozeboom Miller Architects

Tenants
- U.S. Women’s National Hockey Team; Bethel University; Irondale High School, Mounds View High School

The Super Rink is a 300,000-square-foot (28,000 m^{2}) ice rink facility that features eight sheets of ice and is the largest ice arena complex in the world.

The Super Rink was constructed in two stages at a total cost of $21 million, with funding of just $1 million from State of Minnesota grants. The remainder of the funding came from the partner organizations, and revenue from ice rentals covers the annual construction bond obligation.

The facility was a combined project of the NSC, Minnesota Amateur Sports Commission (MASC), the Herb Brooks Foundation, Bethel University, and eleven local hockey organizations (Arden Hills, Blaine, Centerville, Circle Pines, Forest Lake, Coon Rapids, Centennial, Lino Lakes, Mounds View, New Brighton, and Shoreview). Ramsey County and Anoka County also helped in funding. The Super Rink has not received any additional funding since its construction; it is completely self-sufficient through private ice rentals and in-house programs.

The original facility, constructed by Shingobee Builders, opened in 1998 and included four Olympic-regulation-sized (100 ft × 200 ft (30 m × 61 m)) ice sheets:

- Rink #1 - Coon Rapids Arena
- Rink #2 - Blaine Arena
- Rink #3 - Minnesota Amateur Sports Commission/Centennial Arena
- Rink #4 - Ramsey County Arena

The Super Rink was expanded in 2006; the expansion included the Herb Brooks Training Center, a figure skating training room, concession area, 32 locker rooms, and four NHL regulation-sized (85 ft × 200 ft (26 m × 61 m)) ice sheets:

- Rink #5 - Bethel University Arena
- Rink #6 - Herb Brooks Foundation Arena
- Rink #7 - Blaine Youth Hockey Arena
- Rink #8 - Centennial Youth Hockey Arena

Herb Brooks Training Center

The Herb Brooks Training Center (HBTC) is a hockey training center used for both off-ice and on-ice skills training protocols. The facility has many off-ice hockey specific training stations, including a skating treadmill. The HBTC is run and operated by the Flexx Hockey Institute of Training (FHIT). FHIT offers memberships to the HBTC and year-round training programs.

== Blaine Baseball Stadium ==
As part of the 105th Avenue Redevelopment Project, a new 5,000-seat multi-use stadium broke ground November 2024. The city hopes to be associated with an MLB partner league.
