= Shane Hill (footballer) =

English footballer

Personal information
- Date of birth: 5 August 1987 (age 39)
- Place of birth: London, England
- Position: Midfielder

Senior career*
Years	Team	Apps	(Gls)
2004–2005	Hitchin Town	13	(0)
2005–2006	Sheffield United	0	(0)
2007	Rushden & Diamonds	0	(0)
2010	Windsor & Eton	1	(0)
2011	Tampa Bay Rowdies	17	(2)
2011–2012	Leighton Town	8	(1)
2012–2014	Tampa Bay Rowdies	66	(5)
2015–2016	Biggleswade Town		
2016	→ St Albans City (loan)		
2016–2017	St Albans City	7	(1)
2017–2018	Biggleswade Town		
- * Club domestic league appearances and goals as of 10 May 2017

Shane Hill (born 5 August 1987 in London) is an English footballer who plays as a midfielder.

== Career ==
=== England ===
Hill began his career as a trialist for Manchester United as a 16-year-old, but was not taken on by the superclub, and eventually found his way to non-league Hitchin Town, playing for them in the Southern Football League Premier Division, the seventh level of English football, in the 2004–2005 season.

Hill joined Sheffield United as a youth player on 25 August 2005, but was released at the end of the 2005–06 having never played a first team game for the Blades. He trialed with Luton Town during the summer of 2006, but was not offered a contract, and eventually signed for Rushden & Diamonds of the Football Conference on 4 January 2007. He was released by the Diamonds at the end of the season, again without having made a first team appearance for the club.

=== United States ===
Hill moved to the United States in 2010 and was a pre-season trialist with FC Tampa Bay prior to their first competitive season in the USSF Division 2 Pro League. When his father was hired as the head coach of the club in 2011, Hill returned to the United States, trialed with the team during the 2011 pre-season, and signed a formal contract on 6 April 2011. He made his debut for Tampa on 31 May, coming on as a late substitute in a game against NSC Minnesota Stars.

Tampa Bay announced on 27 December 2011 that it declined the 2012 contract option for Hill. However, one month later the club signed him to a new contract for 2012 which includes a club option for 2013.

== Personal ==
Shane is the son of former Luton Town standout and England international Ricky Hill. Ricky Hill did coach Shane for the Tampa Bay Rowdies in the North American Soccer League before both were let go.
