= Keith Savage =

American soccer player

Personal information
- Full name: Keith Savage
- Date of birth: August 9, 1985 (age 41)
- Place of birth: Gulf Breeze, Florida, United States
- Height: 6 ft 2 in (1.88 m)
- Position: Winger

Youth career
- Pensacola Revolution

College career
Years	Team	Apps	(Gls)
2003–2007	West Florida Argonauts	78	(47)

Senior career*
Years	Team	Apps	(Gls)
2006–2007	Central Florida Kraze	22	(12)
2008	Chivas USA	6	(0)
2009–2010	Portland Timbers	40	(3)
2011–2017	Tampa Bay Rowdies	134	(14)
2016	→ Tampa Bay Rowdies 2 (loan)	2	(0)
2018	Pensacola FC	0	(0)
- * Club domestic league appearances and goals

Keith Savage (born August 9, 1985) is an American former professional soccer player who is the head coach of the Tampa Bay Rowdies USL Academy team.

== Career ==
=== College and amateur ===
Savage attended Gulf Breeze High School in Gulf Breeze, Florida, played club soccer for Pensacola Revolution, and played college soccer at the University of West Florida, where he was GSC Freshman of the Year in 2003. He was named to the Division II All-South Region Team and the All-GSC First Team in 2005, earned NSCAA/adidas All-America honors in 2006, and scored 33 career goals for the Argonauts between 2003 and 2007, the fourth-highest total in school's history.

During his college years he also played with Central Florida Kraze in the USL Premier Development League.

=== Professional ===
Savage was drafted 43rd overall of the 2008 MLS SuperDraft by Chivas USA, and made his MLS debut for Chivas against Columbus Crew on 12 April 2008.

He was released by Chivas USA in February 2009, having played in just six league games for the team, and signed with the Portland Timbers of the USL First Division later that month.

Savage signed with FC Tampa Bay of the North American Soccer League on February 22, 2011. The contract was for one year with a club option for 2012. Tampa Bay exercised the 2012 option on Savage on October 4, 2011.

=== Coaching ===
In June 2021 Savage was named head coach of the Tampa Bay Rowdies USL Academy side.

== Personal ==
Savage is the son of former U.S. national team player Bruce Savage.

While playing for Chivas USA, Savage also was a trainer for the Fullerton Rangers Soccer Club in Fullerton, California. He coached the players on the U13 Fullerton Rangers in their signature league.

Savage is retired now from a torn ACL. He works as the athletic director for Skycrest Christian School in Clearwater, Florida.

== Honors ==
=== Tampa Bay Rowdies ===
- North American Soccer League:
  - Champion (1) 2012

=== Portland Timbers ===
- USL First Division Commissioner's Cup (1): 2009
