= Martyn Lancaster =

English association football player (born 1980)

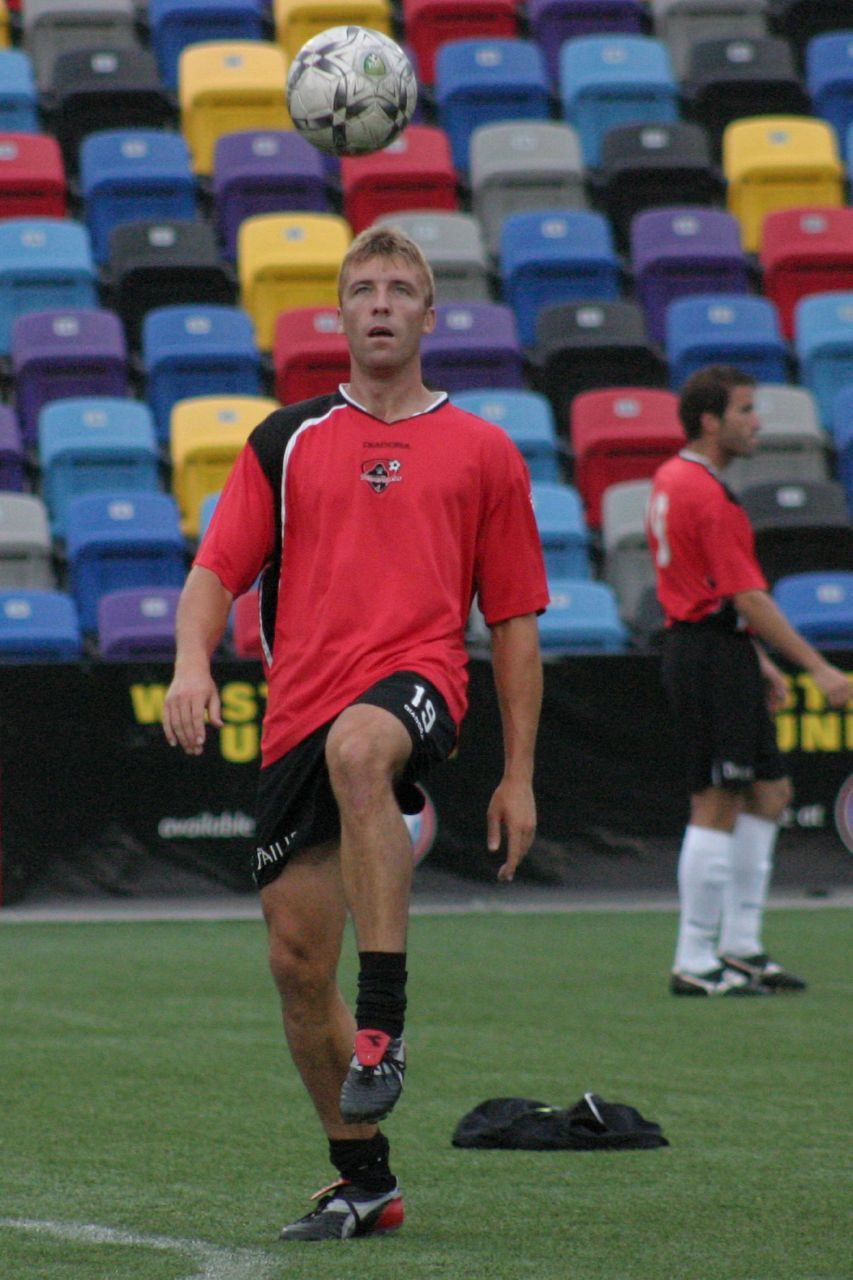
- Lancaster with the Atlanta Silverbacks in 2007

Personal information
- Full name: Martyn Neil Lancaster
- Date of birth: 10 November 1980 (age 46)
- Place of birth: Billinge, Greater Manchester, England
- Height: 6 ft 1 in (1.85 m)
- Positions: Centre-back; full-back

Youth career
- 1997–2000: Chester City

Senior career*
Years	Team	Apps	(Gls)
1998–2003	Chester City	105	(2)
2003–2004	Leigh RMI	46	(2)
2004	Leek Town	4	(0)
2004	Northwich Victoria	5	(0)
2004	Worksop Town	0	(0)
2004	Stalybridge Celtic	0	(0)
2004–2005	Southport	2	(0)
2005	Ashton United	1	(0)
2006	Wilmington Hammerheads	19	(1)
2007–2008	Atlanta Silverbacks	44	(0)
2009	Queen of the South	15	(2)
2009	Ljungskile	1	(0)
2010–2011	Fort Lauderdale Strikers^{[a]}	48	(1)
2012–2013	Atlanta Silverbacks	48	(1)
2014	Georgia Revolution	0	(0)
Total		338	(9)

International career
2002	England C	1	(0)
- * Club domestic league appearances and goals as of 9 May 2014 [a] Miami FC changed its name to Fort Lauderdale Strikers prior to the 2011 season.

Martyn Neil Lancaster (born 10 November 1980) is an English retired professional footballer who played as a defender. He signed for Chester City in 1997 after a successful trial with the club, and played in the Football League and later the Football Conference. After making over 100 appearances for City, and winning the Conference League Cup in 2001, he was allowed to leave in early 2003. After 18 months with Leigh RMI, he played for a host of non-league clubs including Northwich Victoria, Stalybridge Celtic, and Southport.

Lancaster moved to the United States in 2005, initially to coach at a high school, but soon got the chance to play competitively again. After an unsuccessful trial with the Atlanta Silverbacks, he signed for USL Second Division club Wilmington Hammerheads in 2006. He impressed in his season with Wilmington and moved up a division to sign for the Atlanta Silverbacks in 2007. He had two successful seasons with Atlanta, including being runner-up in the USL First Division in his debut season, but the club went on hiatus in late 2008 so he was forced to move on. He moved back to the United Kingdom in early 2009 to join Scottish First Division club Queen of the South. He spent six months with Queens before being released at the end of the season. He signed for Swedish club Ljungskile in the summer of 2009, and despite winning the DM Cup, his tenure was short with the Superettan side.

In 2010, Lancaster moved back to the United States, signing for Miami FC who later change their name to the Fort Lauderdale Strikers in 2011. He spent two years with Fort Lauderdale, being runner-up in Soccer Bowl 2011, in what were his final appearances for the club. He returned to the Atlanta Silverbacks in 2012, who were now competing in the North American Soccer League. He was a key player in his second spell with Atlanta, becoming club captain, and leading the club to Soccer Bowl 2013 despite not playing in the championship game itself. After a short spell with National Premier Soccer League club Georgia Revolution in 2014, he retired from competitive football.

== Early life ==
Lancaster was born in Billinge in Wigan, Greater Manchester. He lived in Haydock and attended Haydock High School. He grew up supporting Manchester United and was a keen admirer of centre-backs Steve Bruce and Gary Pallister, describing them as "a rock at the back". He was also impressed by the play of Eric Cantona and described him as "a real special player for United".

== Club career ==
=== Chester City ===
Lancaster joined Chester City after initially writing to the club asking for a trial. He played his way through the Youth Training Scheme before earning a place in the first team in late 1998. On 14 November 1998, Lancaster made his debut for Chester in the defeat against Cardiff City, he replaced Jonathan Cross in the 65th minute of the FA Cup first round tie at Ninian Park. Two weeks later he made his full debut for the club in the league defeat at Brentford. After impressing in his debut season, he picked up the Young Player of the Year award and was given a contract for the following season.

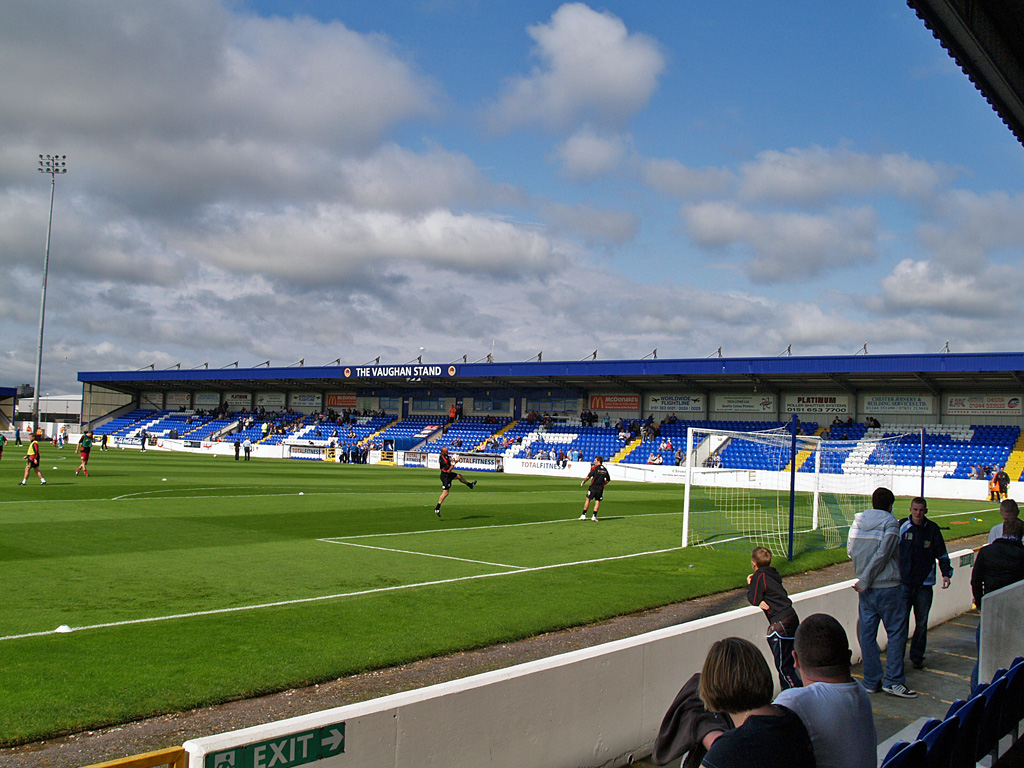
Deva Stadium, home of Chester City, where Lancaster began his playing career

Lancaster played the full 90 minutes in the opening game of the 1999–2000 season; a 2–0 loss against Barnet at the Deva Stadium. He was sent off twice in the space of four days in August 1999, the first in the win against Port Vale in the League Cup first round, and the second in the league defeat at Rotherham United. He received a three match ban as a result. Lancaster impressed in the League Cup second round tie against Aston Villa despite Chester losing 6–0 on aggregate, and his performances earned him a trial at the Premier League club. In October, he went on a week's trial at Villa and played in a reserve team match against Blackburn Rovers, however no permanent move was made. He struggled to regain his place in the first team after the trial, and after a dismal display in the 7–1 defeat against Brighton & Hove Albion in February 2000, he would not play again until the final day of the season when Chester were relegated from the Football League after 69 years.

Lancaster started to feature more prominently at the beginning of the 2000–01 season, as he began to start the majority of games under new manager Graham Barrow. Chester made it to the third round of the FA Cup; Lancaster featured in all the games including the qualifying round against Easington Colliery, the defeats of league clubs Plymouth Argyle and Oxford United in rounds one and two respectively, and finally the loss at Premier League side Blackburn Rovers. On 27 January 2001, he scored his first senior goal for Chester in the win against Morecambe, he scored what turned out to be the winning goal in the 13th minute. He played in both legs as City lost 4–0 on aggregate in the FA Trophy semi-final against Canvey Island in April. Lancaster concluded his season with silverware as Chester won the Conference League Cup after beating Kingstonian 4–2 on penalties following a 0–0 draw at Kingsmeadow.

"I have apologised to the club about what went on at the end of last season and I'm sorry it all happened. I love Chester City. I've been here six years and it's my club and I'm Chester City through and through. I'm grateful I've been given this chance and all I want to do now is concentrate on playing football and focusing on getting the club back into the Football League."

— Lancaster on being reinstated at Chester City in June 2002.

Lancaster's first appearance of the 2001–02 season came in the defeat at Southport on 21 August 2001. He picked up his fifth booking of the season in the draw with Doncaster Rovers in October and was subsequently suspended for one match. On 13 November, Lancaster replaced Scott Ruscoe in the 80th minute of the Conference Championship Shield match against Rushden & Diamonds; the tie ended 2–2 after extra time with Chester losing 4–3 on penalties. He was transfer-listed by City in early December, and on 4 December he suffered a concussion in the game against Morecambe. On 1 April 2002, he scored his first goal of the season in the draw against Yeovil Town. Chester manager Mark Wright took the decision to sack Lancaster in May, it came after a number of serious incidents that breached club rules.

In June 2002, Lancaster was reinstated by the club and reported back for pre-season training. He had apologised for his wrongdoings the previous season, and after talks with the board, it was decided that he would be given another chance at the club with the understanding he would be on his last warning. His first appearance of the season came in the win against Burton Albion in September, he replaced Scott Guyett in the 26th minute and helped City extend their unbeaten run to 11 games. Lancaster was allowed to join Third Division club Lincoln City on trial in November but no permanent move was made. He made his final appearance for Chester in the defeat to Worksop Town in January 2003. He played the full 90 minutes as Chester were eliminated from the FA Trophy in the third round.

=== Leigh RMI ===
"He had a great part to play in the improvement of our defensive record and is a major part of our plans for next season. The partnership and understanding that he built up with Neil Durkin was impressive and I'm looking forward to that continuing."

— Mark Patterson on Lancaster signing a new contract at Leigh RMI in June 2003.

In January 2003, Lancaster signed for Conference club Leigh RMI. On 18 January, he made his debut in the win against Burton Albion at Eton Park. He scored his first goal for the club in the win against Forest Green Rovers on 29 March. A week later he was sent off in the defeat at Stevenage Borough. On 16 April, he played 61 minutes as RMI beat Kendal Town to win the Lancashire FA Challenge Trophy. Lancaster ended his first season at Leigh with 13 league appearances and one goal as RMI avoided relegation. Manager Mark Patterson persuaded him to sign on at Leigh for another season despite having offers from other clubs.

Lancaster started the opening game of the 2003–04 season and played the full 90 minutes as RMI beat Dagenham & Redbridge 2–1 at Hilton Park. He received the second red card of his Leigh tenure on 13 September when he was sent off for violent conduct in the defeat at Gravesend & Northfleet. On 25 October, Lancaster played in the FA Cup fourth qualifying round defeat against Accrington Stanley. His first goal of the season came in March 2004 when he scored a last minute equaliser in the draw with Telford United. He finished the season with 33 league appearances and one goal as Leigh finished 21st in the table. However, the club were saved from relegation because of Margate's demotion due to complications with their ground. Lancaster was released in May 2004; RMI manager Phil Starbuck stating he was looking to rebuild the club with new players for the following season.

=== Leek Town ===
Lancaster signed for Northern Premier League Premier Division club Leek Town in August 2004. On 21 August, he made his debut in the league win against Bishop Auckland, however he was sent off in the closing stages of the game. He only made four appearances for Leek before leaving the club in September.

=== Northwich Victoria ===
Lancaster signed for Conference National club Northwich Victoria in September 2004, he joined the club when they were winless in the league and had just entered administration. He made his debut in the 0–0 draw with York City on 18 September, helping Victoria to their first clean sheet of the season. He made four more appearances, the last in the 3–0 defeat at Scarborough, before leaving the club in October.

=== Worksop Town ===
Lancaster joined Conference North club Worksop Town at the end of October 2004. On 30 October, he was an unused substitute in the FA Cup fourth qualifying round draw with Alfreton Town, but he left the club soon after.

=== Stalybridge Celtic ===
Lancaster signed for fellow Conference North club Stalybridge Celtic on 5 November 2004. He made his debut the following day when he played the full 90 minutes as Celtic beat Harrogate Town in the FA Trophy first round. Stalybridge won the tie 3–2 after being 2–0 down after 85 minutes. This was his only appearance for the club as he moved on again a few days later.

=== Southport ===
Lancaster signed for another Conference North club in November 2004 when he joined Southport. He made his debut on 22 January 2005 when he replaced Jimmy Williams in the win against promotion rivals Kettering Town. He made one more senior appearance, in the 3−1 win against Worcester City, before departing the club in February.

=== Ashton United ===
Lancaster signed for his fourth Conference North club of the season when he joined Ashton United in February 2005. On 5 March, he played in the league defeat against Vauxhall Motors.

=== Wilmington Hammerheads ===
In the summer of 2005, Lancaster went to the United States to coach at a high school, and after missing competitive football, he was persuaded to attend an open tryout for the Atlanta Silverbacks. However, Atlanta already had their full quota of international players so they passed on Lancaster. He was then put in touch with David Irving, who was head coach USL Second Division club Wilmington Hammerheads and a fellow Englishman, and he offered a Lancaster a trial. Once Irving saw Lancaster play, he signed him to a contract for the upcoming season. On 5 May, he made his debut in the draw with the Charlotte Eagles at Waddell High School. He scored his first goal for Wilmington on 18 June in the draw with the Harrisburg City Islanders at the Skyline Sports Complex. Lancaster impressed in the win against USL-1 side the Atlanta Silverbacks in the US Open Cup third round in July, however Wilmington lost to Major League Soccer side the New York Red Bulls in the next round. Overall he made 19 league appearances as the Hammerheads finished eighth place, leading the club in minutes played in the process, and also being eighth in the league as a whole.

=== Atlanta Silverbacks ===
"The funny thing is, we did get an opportunity to play against Atlanta in the US Open cup. So here I am playing against the team that rejected me and we beat them. After the game, Coach Smith came to me and asked if I could come to Atlanta again to look at the possibility of me playing for them. I agreed and went into talks with them and we agreed terms and I became a Atlanta Silverback."

— Lancaster on how he signed for Atlanta Silverbacks in November 2009.

Lancaster signed for USL First Division club the Atlanta Silverbacks for the 2007 season, he signed a three-year deal with the club. He made his debut on 16 June when he played the whole game in the draw with California Victory at the RE/MAX Greater Atlanta Stadium. On 9 July, he played against MLS side FC Dallas in the third round of the US Open Cup. Atlanta narrowly missed out on a cup upset when they lost 4–3 on penalties after a 1–1 draw at Pizza Hut Park. Lancaster played in every league game after his debut as Atlanta finished in fourth place in the league meaning they qualified for the playoffs. He featured for Atlanta as they beat the Rochester Raging Rhinos and the Portland Timbers to secure their first ever championship appearance. On 29 September, Lancaster started the championship game and played 89 minutes as Atlanta lost to the Seattle Sounders at Starfire Sports Complex.

Lancaster started the opening game of the 2008 season, and played 90 minutes in the draw with the Carolina RailHawks before being replaced by Tate Parrish in stoppage time. On 24 June, he replaced Scott Buete in the final 10 minutes as Atlanta were knocked out of the US Open Cup by fellow USL-1 side Miami FC Blues. The second round tie finished 1–0 at Tropical Park Stadium. Overall he made 26 league appearances as Atlanta placed 10th in the league table. At the end of the season, Atlanta announced that due to the state of the economy and the potential of a MLS club coming to the city, their men's team would sit out the 2009 season. Lancaster left the club as a result.

=== Queen of the South ===
In January 2009, Lancaster signed for Scottish First Division club Queen of the South. The deal made headlines when it transpired that he had been signed on the strength of a YouTube highlights video uploaded by his wife. He made his debut in the defeat at Falkirk in the Scottish Cup fourth round on 10 January. On 7 March, Lancaster scored his first goal for Queens when he headed the equaliser in the draw against Greenock Morton at Palmerston Park. Three days later he scored again when he headed the winning goal in the 3−2 win against Dundee. He played in the 7–1 win against Clyde on 25 April, and featured a week later in the defeat against Dunfermline Athletic, the latter being his last appearance for the club. Lancaster was released by Queens in May.

=== Ljungskile ===
Lancaster signed for Swedish Superettan club Ljungskile in July 2009. Ljungskile were made aware of Lancaster's availability after they signed Ryan Miller earlier in the summer, and the two players shared the same agent. On 28 August, Lancaster made his debut in the league defeat against AFC Eskilstuna, he replaced Aleksandar Kitić for the final eight minutes of the match. He featured in the team that won the DM Cup in September; Ljungskile beat IFK Uddevalla 5−2 in the final played at Rimnersvallen.

=== Miami FC / Fort Lauderdale Strikers ===
In April 2010, Lancaster returned to the United States when he signed for USSF Division 2 Professional League club Miami FC. He made his debut in the draw with the Rochester Rhinos on the opening weekend of the season. He played 21 times throughout the season as Miami finished fourth place in the NASL Conference, however they missed out on the playoffs by four points. In November, Miami announced that they would become the Fort Lauderdale Strikers starting in the 2011 season.

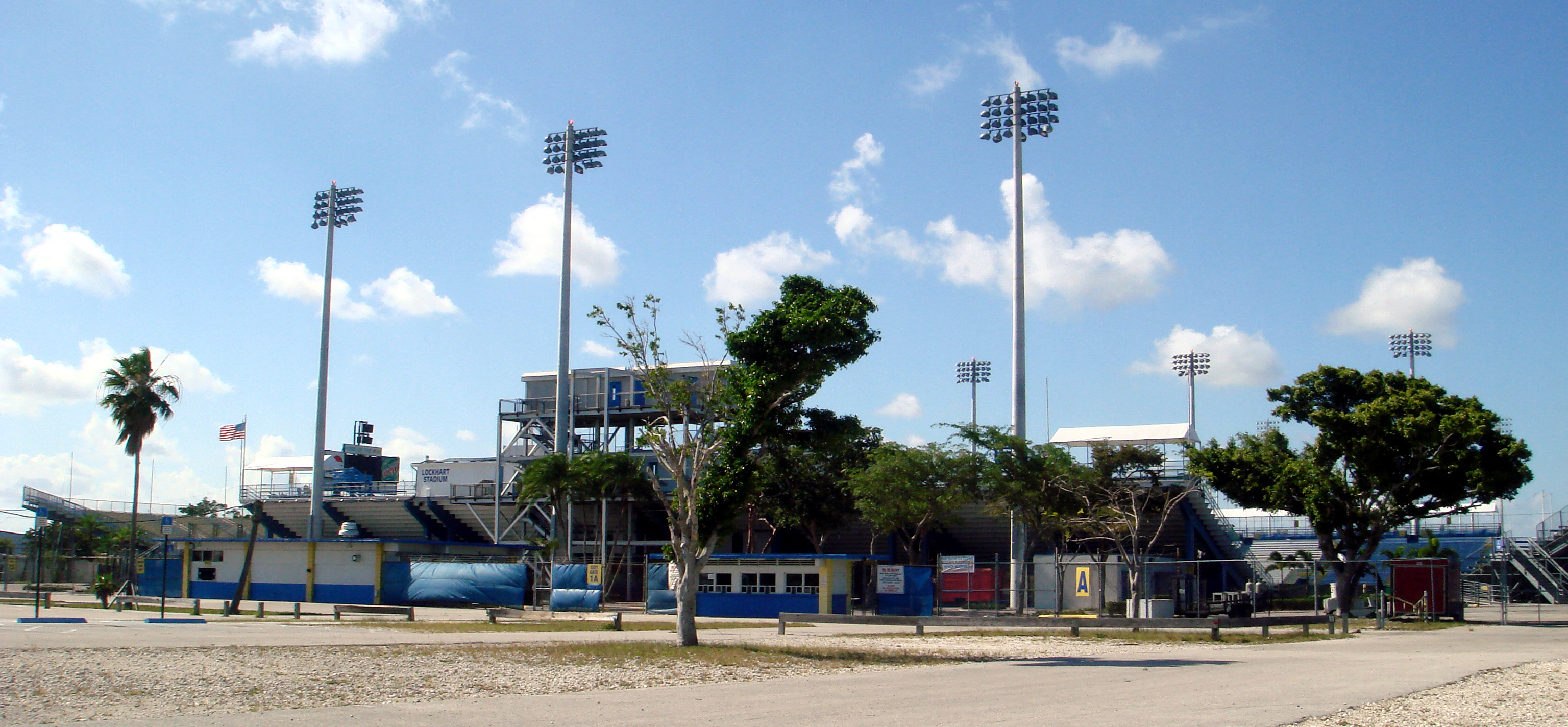
Lockhart Stadium, home of the Fort Lauderdale Strikers

Lancaster signed on for another year at Fort Lauderdale in early 2011. On 10 April, he scored the new Strikers' first ever goal in the league loss against FC Edmonton on the opening day of the season. He feature heavily during the season, playing in 27 out of 28 league games, ultimately helping the Strikers reach the playoffs with a fourth-place finish. He led the team in minutes played and would also be fourth in league overall. On 1 October, Lancaster played in the win against FC Edmonton to put Fort Lauderdale through to the playoff semi-finals. He then featured in both legs of the semi-final against the Puerto Rico Islanders as the Strikers won 5–2 on aggregate to progress to Soccer Bowl 2011. Lancaster started both legs of Soccer Bowl as Fort Lauderdale lost 3–1 on aggregate to NSC Minnesota. These were his last appearances for club.

=== Return to Atlanta Silverbacks ===
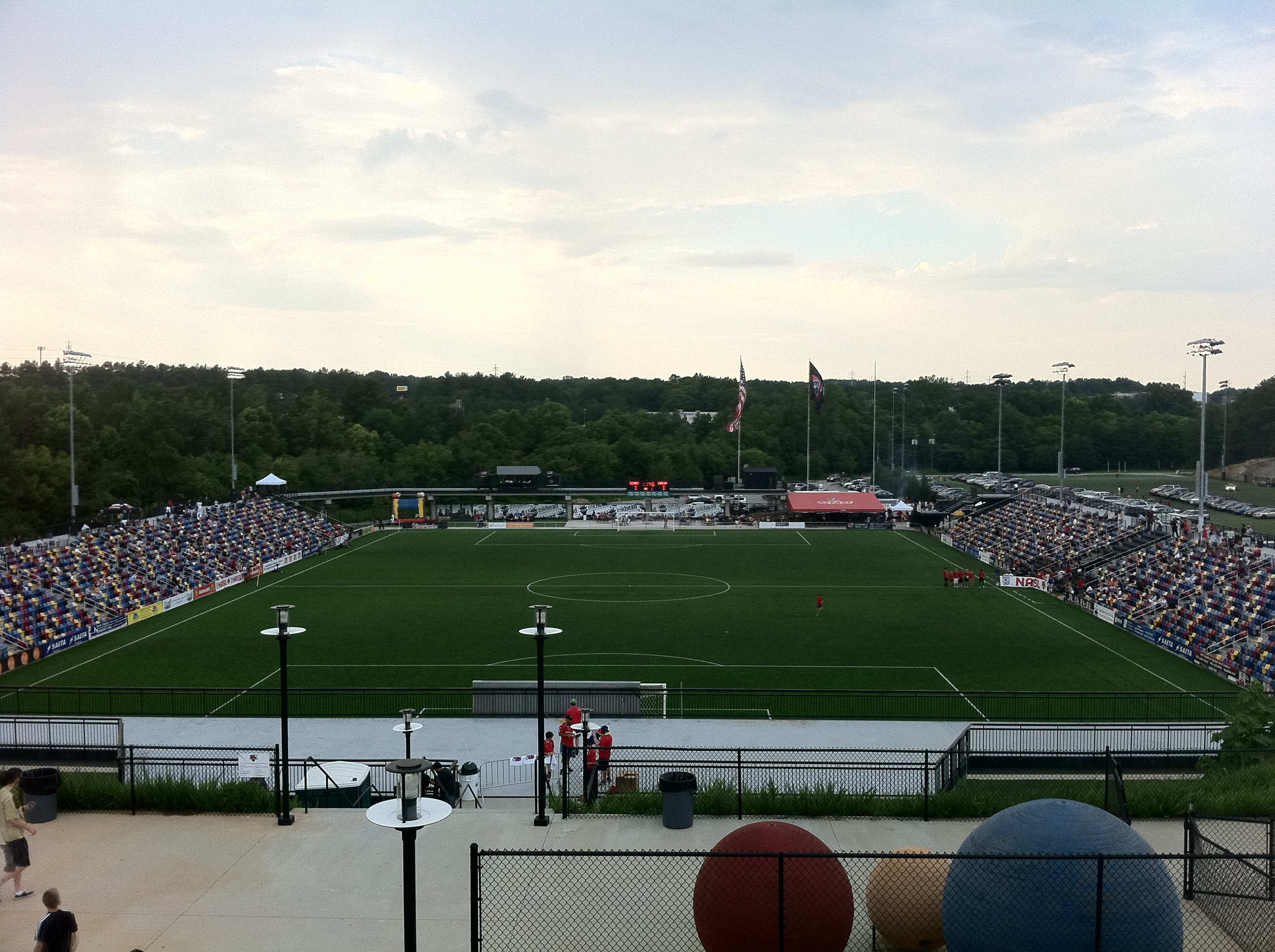
Atlanta Silverbacks Park, where Lancaster played for four years of his career

Lancaster re-signed with former club Atlanta Silverbacks in December 2011. He made the decision to sign after Alex Pineda Chacón was announced as the Atlanta's new head coach, and Pineda Chacón was someone who impressed Lancaster during his first stint with the club when he was assistant coach. He made his second debut for the club on 7 April when he started in the draw with the San Antonio Scorpions, he had a close range header cleared off the line in the game at Atlanta Silverbacks Park. On 16 May, Lancaster was sent off in the defeat against the Puerto Rico Islanders, and at the beginning of June he was sent off again in the win against FC Edmonton. Despite Lancaster playing 25 league games and leading the club in minutes played, Atlanta missed out on the playoffs, finishing seventh place in the league.

Lancaster started the opening game of the 2013 season; he played the whole game in the win against his former club the Fort Lauderdale Strikers. On 18 May 2013, he scored his first goal for the club when he headed the second goal in the victory against the Carolina RailHawks. Lancaster featured in 11 games as Atlanta won the Spring season, they sealed the championship with the 3–0 win against Minnesota United at the National Sports Center in July, securing their place in Soccer Bowl 2013 in the process. He played 12 times during the Fall season but he was injured in the final league game of the season against the New York Cosmos, meaning he would start Soccer Bowl as substitute, and subsequently wouldn't feature in the defeat against the Cosmos. Lancaster's efforts throughout the season earned him a place in the NASL 2013 Best XI.

=== Georgia Revolution ===
After retiring from professional football, Lancaster signed for National Premier Soccer League semi-professional club Georgia Revolution in May 2014.

== International career ==
Lancaster was called up to the England C national side in November 2002. On 20 November, he came off the bench in the defeat against an Italy Serie C Select at Stadio Giovanni Zini in Cremona.

== Coaching career ==
Lancaster is a US National A and B licensed coach, and also has UEFA B and C licences. Additionally, he has NSCAA Advanced National and Premier diplomas.

After retiring from playing, Lancaster started youth football club Georgia Knights in 2013. His aim was to bring a quality soccer program to the youth in his community. The club, based in his hometown of Cartersville, grew from 20 participants in its inaugural season to over 200 in under a year. He is the president and director of coaching at the club.

== Personal life ==
Lancaster married Mysti Morris, a tennis instructor, after the two met whilst coaching at the same high school in 2005. Their daughter, Mariella, was born in 2011. They live in Cartersville, Georgia.

== Career statistics ==
=== Club ===
As of 2 November 2013

Appearances and goals by club, season and competition
Club	Season	League			Cup (Note: Appearance(s) in FA Cup, US Open Cup & Scottish Cup)		League Cup (Note: Appearance(s) in Football League Cup & Conference League Cup)		FL Trophy		FA Trophy		Other		Total	
Club	Season	Division	Apps	Goals	Apps	Goals	Apps	Goals	Apps	Goals	Apps	Goals	Apps	Goals	Apps	Goals
Chester City	1998–99	Third Division	11	0	1	0	0	0	1	0	–		0	0	13	0
Chester City	1999–2000	Third Division	17	0	2	0	3	0	1	0	–		0	0	23	0
Chester City	2000–01	Conference	39	1	5	0	4	0	2	0	5	0	0	0	55	1
Chester City	2001–02	Conference	35	1	1	0	–		0	0	6	0	1 (Note: Appearance(s) in Conference Championship Shield)	0	43	1
Chester City	2002–03	Conference	3	0	0	0	–		0	0	1	0	0	0	4	0
Chester City	Total		105	2	9	0	7	0	4	0	12	0	1	0	138	2
Leigh RMI	2002–03	Conference	13	1	0	0	–		0	0	0	0	3 (Note: Appearance(s) in Lancashire FA Challenge Trophy)	0	16	1
Leigh RMI	2003–04	Conference	33	1	1	0	–		0	0	1	0	2	0	37	1
Leigh RMI	Total		46	2	1	0	0	0	0	0	1	0	5	0	53	2
Leek Town	2004–05	NPL Premier Division	4	0	0	0	–		–		0	0	0	0	4	0
Northwich Victoria	2004–05	Conference National	5	0	0	0	0	0	0	0	0	0	0	0	5	0
Worksop Town	2004–05	Conference North	0	0	0	0	0	0	–		0	0	0	0	0	0
Stalybridge Celtic	2004–05	Conference North	0	0	0	0	0	0	–		1	0	0	0	1	0
Southport	2004–05	Conference North	2	0	0	0	0	0	–		0	0	0	0	2	0
Ashton United	2004–05	Conference North	1	0	0	0	0	0	–		0	0	0	0	1	0
Wilmington Hammerheads	2006	USL Second Division	19	1	4	0	–		–		–		0	0	23	1
Atlanta Silverbacks	2007	USL First Division	18	0	2	0	–		–		–		5 (Note: Appearance(s) in USL First Division Playoffs)	0	25	0
Atlanta Silverbacks	2008	USL First Division	26	0	2	0	–		–		–		0	0	28	0
Atlanta Silverbacks	Total		44	0	4	0	0	0	0	0	0	0	5	0	53	0
Queen of the South	2008–09	Scottish First Division	15	2	1	0	0	0	–		–		0	0	16	2
Ljungskile	2009	Superettan	1	0	0	0	–		–		–		1 (Note: Appearance(s) in DM Cup)	0	2	0
Miami FC	2010	USSF D2 Pro League	21	0	0	0	–		–		–		0	0	21	0
Fort Lauderdale Strikers (Note: Miami FC changed its name to Fort Lauderdale Strikers prior to the 2011 season)	2011	NASL	27	1	0	0	–		–		–		5 (Note: Appearance(s) in NASL Playoffs)	0	32	1
Miami FC / Fort Lauderdale Strikers total			48	1	0	0	0	0	0	0	0	0	5	0	53	1
Atlanta Silverbacks	2012	NASL	25	0	2	0	–		–		–		0	0	27	0
Atlanta Silverbacks	2013	NASL	23	1	0	0	–		–		–		0	0	23	1
Atlanta Silverbacks	Total		48	1	2	0	0	0	0	0	0	0	0	0	50	1
Atlanta Silverbacks combined total			92	1	6	0	0	0	0	0	0	0	5	0	103	1
Georgia Revolution	2014	NPSL	0	0	0	0	–		–		–		0	0	0	0
Career total			338	9	21	0	7	0	4	0	14	0	17	0	401	9

=== International ===
As of 20 November 2002

National team	Year	Apps	Goals
England C	2002	1	0
Total		1	0

== Honours ==
=== Club ===
Chester City

- Conference League Cup (1): 2000–01
- Conference Championship Shield runner-up (1): 2000–01

Leigh RMI

- Lancashire FA Challenge Trophy (1): 2002–03

Atlanta Silverbacks

- Southern Derby runner-up (2): 2007, 2008
- USL First Division runner-up (1): 2007
- North American Soccer League Spring championship (1): 2013
- Soccer Bowl runner-up (1): 2013

Ljungskile

- DM Cup (1): 2009

Fort Lauderdale Strikers

- Soccer Bowl runner-up (1): 2011

=== Individual ===
- Chester City Young Player of the Year (1): 1998–99
- Chester City Tony O'Brien Memorial Award (1): 2001–02
- USL Second Division Team of the Week (1): 2006 (Week 11)
- Fort Lauderdale Strikers Player of the Year (1): 2011
- North American Soccer League Team of the Week (1): 2013 (Week 7 Spring season)
- North American Soccer League Best XI (1): 2013
