= List of Minnesota United FC seasons =

Minnesota United FC refers to two iterations of a club based in Minneapolis, Minnesota. The club originally began play as NSC Minnesota Stars in 2010 and rebranded as Minnesota United FC (2010–2016) in 2013. The team played its first year in the temporary USSF Division 2 Professional League before transitioning to the North American Soccer League in 2011 and Major League Soccer in 2017 as an expansion franchise known as Minnesota United FC. This list of seasons contains the results of both versions of the club, with totals including combined statistics from the two teams.

== Key ==
Key to competitions

- Major League Soccer (MLS) – The top-flight of soccer in the United States, established in 1996.
- North American Soccer League (NASL) – The second division of soccer in the United States from 2011 through 2017, now defunct.
- USSF Division 2 Professional League (D2 Pro) – The second division of soccer in the United States for a single season in 2010, now defunct.
- U.S. Open Cup (USOC) – The premier knockout cup competition in U.S. soccer, first contested in 1914.
- CONCACAF Champions League (CCL) – The premier competition in North American soccer since 1962. It went by the name of Champions' Cup until 2008.

Key to colors and symbols

1st or W	Winners
2nd or RU	Runners-up
3rd	Third place
Last	Last place
♦	League top scorer
	Highest average attendance
Italics	Ongoing competition

Key to league record

- Season = The year and article of the season
- Div = Division/level on pyramid
- League = League name
- Pld = Games played
- W = Games won
- L = Games lost
- D = Games drawn
- GF = Goals for
- GA = Goals against
- GD = Goal difference
- Pts = Points
- PPG = Points per game
- Conf. = Conference position
- Overall = League position

Key to cup record

- DNE = Did not enter
- DNQ = Did not qualify
- NH = Competition not held or canceled
- QR = Qualifying round
- PR = Preliminary round
- GS = Group stage
- R1 = First round
- R2 = Second round
- R3 = Third round
- R4 = Fourth round
- R5 = Fifth round
- Ro16 = Round of 16
- QF = Quarterfinals
- SF = Semifinals
- F = Final
- RU = Runners-up
- W = Winners

== Seasons ==
As of August 29th, 2026

Season	League											Position		Playoffs	USOC	Continental / Other		Average attendance	Top goalscorer(s)	
Season	Div	League	Pld	W	L	D	GF	GA	GD	Pts	PPG	Conf.	Overall	Playoffs	USOC	Continental / Other		Average attendance	Name(s)	Goals
2010	2	D2 Pro	30	11	12	7	32	36	–4	40	1.33	4th	7th	QF	R2	DNE		1,374	(Italy) Simone Bracalello	6
2011	2	NASL	28	9	10	9	30	32	–2	36	1.29	N/A	6th	W	DNE	DNE		1,676	(Italy) Simone Bracalello (United States) Neil Hlavaty	6
2012	2	NASL	28	8	9	11	34	33	+1	35	1.25	N/A	6th	RU	R3	DNQ		2,651	(Jamaica) Amani Walker	9
2013	2	NASL	26	10	12	4	39	42	–3	34	1.31	N/A	4th	DNQ	R2	DNQ		4,445	(Brazil) Pablo Campos	13
2014	2	NASL	27	16	4	7	47	28	+19	55	2.04	N/A	1st	SF	R4	DNQ		6,133	(United States) Christian Ramirez	21♦
2015	2	NASL	30	14	5	11	54	39	+15	53	1.77	N/A	3rd	SF	R3	DNQ		8,767	(United States) Christian Ramirez	13
2016	2	NASL	32	11	13	8	41	37	+4	41	1.28	N/A	5th	DNQ	R4	DNQ		8,573	(United States) Christian Ramirez	19♦
2017	1	MLS	34	10	18	6	47	70	–23	36	1.06	9th	19th	DNQ	R4	DNQ		20,538	(United States) Christian Ramirez	14
2018	1	MLS	34	11	20	3	49	71	–22	36	1.06	10th	18th	DNQ	Ro16	DNQ		23,902	(Colombia) Darwin Quintero	11
2019	1	MLS	34	15	11	8	52	43	+9	53	1.56	4th	7th	R1	RU	DNQ		19,723	(Colombia) Darwin Quintero	16
2020	1	MLS	21	9	5	7	36	26	+10	34	1.62	4th	9th	SF	NH	Leagues Cup MLS is Back Tournament	NH SF	N/A	(Trinidad and Tobago) Kevin Molino	13
2021	1	MLS	34	13	11	10	42	44	-2	49	1.44	5th	11th	R1	NH	DNQ		15,809	(Finland) Robin Lod	9
2022	1	MLS	34	14	14	6	48	51	-3	48	1.41	6th	11th	R1	Ro16	DNQ		19,560	(Argentina) Emanuel Reynoso	12
2023	1	MLS	34	10	13	11	46	51	-5	41	1.21	11th	21st	DNQ	Ro16	Leagues Cup	QF	19,568	(South Africa) Bongokuhle Hlongwane	17
2024	1	MLS	34	15	12	7	58	49	+9	52	1.53	6th	10th	QF	DNP	Leagues Cup	GS	19,584	(South Africa) Bongokuhle Hlongwane	11
2025	1	MLS	34	16	8	10	56	39	+17	58	1.71	4th	8th	QF	SF	Leagues Cup	LP	19,247	(Italy) Kelvin Yeboah (United States) Anthony Markanich	13
2026	1	MLS	22	7	7	8	30	32	-2	29	1.32	9th	15th	TBD	Ro16	Leagues Cup	LP	19,330	(Italy) Kelvin Yeboah	11
Total	–	–	516	199	184	133	741	723	+18	730	1.41	–	–	–	–	–		–	(United States) Christian Ramirez	74

1. Avg. attendance only includes statistics from regular season matches.
2. Top goalscorer(s) includes all goals scored in the regular season, playoffs, U.S. Open Cup, MLS is Back tournament, CONCACAF Champions League, FIFA Club World Cup, and other competitive continental matches.
3. Overall Position combines the results of the spring and fall seasons of the North American Soccer League from the structure's implementation in 2013 through 2016, the club's last season in the league.
