= North American Soccer League awards =

The North American Soccer League operated from 2011 to 2017 and presented several awards for individual performance at the end of each season.

== Best XI ==
The Best XI was awarded to the eleven players considered to have been the best in their respective positions.

== Golden Ball Award ==
The Golden Ball was the league's MVP award.

Year	Name	Nationality	Club	Ref.
2011	Etienne Barbara	Malta	Carolina RailHawks	
2012	Pablo Campos	Brazil	San Antonio Scorpions	
2013	Georgi Hristov	Bulgaria	Tampa Bay Rowdies	
2014	Miguel Ibarra	United States	Minnesota United FC	
2015	Stefano Pinho	Brazil	Fort Lauderdale Strikers	
2016	Juan Arango	Venezuela	New York Cosmos	
2017	Stefano Pinho	Brazil	Miami FC	

== Golden Boot Award ==
The Golden Boot was the league's leading scorer award.

Year	Name	Nationality	Club	Ref.
2011	Etienne Barbara	Malta	Carolina RailHawks	
2012	Pablo Campos	Brazil	San Antonio Scorpions	
2013	Brian Shriver	United States	Carolina RailHawks	
2014	Christian Ramirez	United States	Minnesota United FC	
2015	Stefano Pinho	Brazil	Fort Lauderdale Strikers	
2016	Christian Ramirez	United States	Minnesota United FC	
2017	Stefano Pinho	Brazil	Miami FC	

== Golden Glove Award ==
The Golden Glove was the league's goalkeeper of the year award.

Year	Name	Nationality	Club	Ref.
2011	Evan Bush	United States	Montreal Impact	
2012	Daryl Sattler	United States	San Antonio Scorpions	
2013	Kyle Reynish	United States	New York Cosmos	
2014	John Smits	Canada	FC Edmonton	
2015	Romuald Peiser	France	Ottawa Fury FC	
2016	Matt Van Oekel	United States	FC Edmonton	
2017	Mario Daniel Vega	Argentina	Miami FC	

== Coach of the Year Award ==
The Coach of the Year award was initiated in 2011 with an independent panel. In 2012 the NASL adopted it as an official award.

Year	Name	Nationality	Club	Ref.
2011	Manny Lagos	United States	NSC Minnesota Stars	
2012	Ricky Hill	England	Tampa Bay Rowdies	
2013	Brian Haynes	Trinidad and Tobago	Atlanta Silverbacks	
2014	Manny Lagos	United States	Minnesota United FC	
2015	Marc Dos Santos	Canada	Ottawa Fury FC	
2016	Tim Hankinson	United States	Indy Eleven	
2017	Marc Dos Santos	Canada	San Francisco Deltas	

== Fair Play Award ==
Awarded to the team with the lowest point total from Yellow and Red cards throughout the season.

Year	Club	Ref.
2011	Tampa Bay Rowdies	
2012	Tampa Bay Rowdies	
2013	Minnesota United FC	
2014	Tampa Bay Rowdies	
2015	Ottawa Fury FC	
2016	Carolina RailHawks	
2017	North Carolina FC	

== Goal of the Year Award ==
Award voted on by the fans over the internet for the best goal of the season.

Year	Name	Nationality	Club	Ref.
2011	not awarded	–	–	
2012	not awarded	–	–	
2013	Pedro Mendes	Brazil	Atlanta Silverbacks	
2014	Christian Ramirez	United States	Minnesota United FC	
2015	Junior Burgos	El Salvador	Atlanta Silverbacks	
2016	Duke Lacroix	United States	Indy Eleven	
2017	Zach Steinberger	United States	Jacksonville Armada	

== Young Player of the Year ==
Award given to the league's top player under the age of 24.

Year	Name	Nationality	Club	Ref.
2011	not awarded	–	–	
2012	not awarded	–	–	
2013	not awarded	–	–	
2014	Christian Ramirez	United States	Minnesota United FC	
2015	Leo Fernandes	Brazil	New York Cosmos	
2016	Papé Diakité	Senegal	FC Edmonton	
2017	Jack Blake	Scotland	Jacksonville Armada	

== Humanitarian of the Year ==
Award given to the player who most positively impact the lives of others.

Year	Name	Nationality	Club	Ref.
2011	not awarded	–	–	
2012	not awarded	–	–	
2013	not awarded	–	–	
2014	Chris Nurse	Guyana	Fort Lauderdale Strikers	
2015	Drew Beckie	Canada	Ottawa Fury	
2016	Michael Lahoud	Sierra Leone	Miami FC	
2017	Austin da Luz	United States	North Carolina FC	

== Player of the Month ==
Awarded monthly to the best NASL player.
