= Carl Craig (disambiguation) =

Carl Craig (born 1969) is an American electronic music producer and DJ.

Carl Craig may also refer to:

- Carl Craig (football manager) (born 1965), English football manager
- Carl Craig (politician) (1878–1957), American politician
