= Soccer Bowl (2011–2017) =

Soccer tournament

NASL Championship
- NASL Soccer Bowl Trophy
- Organizer(s): North American Soccer League
- Founded: 2011
- Abolished: 2017
- Region: CONCACAF
- Last champion: San Francisco Deltas (1st title)
- Most championships: New York Cosmos (3 titles)
- NASL Championship 2017

The NASL Championship was the annual championship competition of the North American Soccer League (NASL), which formed the second division of American soccer from 2011 to 2017. The competition was held at the end of the regular season and was contested by the two finalists of the playoffs to determine the winner of the NASL Trophy, known as the Soccer Bowl Trophy. The trophy was named for the Soccer Bowl championship game from the original incarnation of the NASL, which ran from 1967 to 1984.

== Format ==
In the league's first two seasons, the championship final was played as a two-match aggregate series at the conclusion of a playoff bracket.

The league announced a switch for the 2013 season to a one-game championship final, also known as the "Soccer Bowl".

Beginning with the 2014 season, a new format was introduced, in which the whole playoff tournament was called the NASL Championship, with the final game being called the NASL Championship Final. From that point on, "Soccer Bowl" was only used in referring only to the physical trophy itself. This format persisted through the 2017 final, the NASL's last, as the league suspended operations shortly thereafter and went defunct the following year.

== Trophy ==
On October 22, 2011, the day their inaugural championship series got underway in Minnesota, the new NASL unveiled its championship trophy. The silver trophy featured a large bowl etched with the NASL logo resting atop three long prongs, and the words "North American Soccer League" and "Soccer Bowl" inscribed prominently across the base.

== Results ==
NASL Championship (2011–2017)
Event	Game	Venue	Location	Champions	Score	Runners-up	Attendance	Television	MVP	Notes
NASL Championship	2011 (NASL Championship Series 2011) October 22, 29	National Sports Center Lockhart Stadium	Blaine, Minnesota Fort Lauderdale, Florida	NSC Minnesota Stars	3–1 0–0 Aggregate; 3–1	Fort Lauderdale Strikers	4,511 6,849	GOL TV	Luke Mulholland (NSC Minnesota Stars)	Luke Mulholland scored game one winning goal in 53rd min.
NASL Championship Series	2012 (NASL Championship Series 2012) October 20, 27	National Sports Center Al Lang Stadium	Blaine, Minnesota St. Petersburg, Florida	Tampa Bay Rowdies	0–2 3–1 Aggregate; 3–3 (a.e.t.); PSO; 3–2	Minnesota Stars	4,642 6,208	Ustream	Jeff Attinella (Tampa Bay Rowdies)	Jeff Attinella saved 3 penalty kicks in shoot-out. Fafà Picault scored winning penalty kick.
Soccer Bowl	2013 (Soccer Bowl 2013) November 9	Atlanta Silverbacks Park	Atlanta, Georgia	New York Cosmos	1–0	Atlanta Silverbacks	7,211	ESPN3; ESPN Deportes	Marcos Senna (New York Cosmos)	Marcos Senna scored championship winning goal in the 50th min.
NASL Championship Final	2014 (NASL Championship Final 2014) November 15	Toyota Field	San Antonio, Texas	San Antonio Scorpions	2–1	Fort Lauderdale Strikers	7,847	ESPN3; ONE World Sports; NASLLive.com; KSAT12; Sofloradio.com	Rafael Castillo (San Antonio Scorpions)	Rafael Castillo scored on a bicycle kick in the 69th min. and assisted on Billy Forbes game winner in 74th min.
NASL Championship Final	2015 (NASL Championship Final 2015) November 15	James M. Shuart Stadium	Hempstead, New York	New York Cosmos	3–2	Ottawa Fury	10,166	ESPN3; ONE World Sports; NASLLive.com	Gastón Cellerino (New York Cosmos)	Gastón Cellerino scored a hat trick before a modern NASL-record playoff crowd.
NASL Championship Final	2016 (NASL Championship Final 2016) November 15	Belson Stadium	Queens, New York	New York Cosmos	0–0; PSO; 4–2	Indy Eleven	2,150	CBS Sports Network	None	
NASL Championship Final	2017 (NASL Championship Final 2017) November 12	Kezar Stadium	San Francisco	San Francisco Deltas	2–0	New York Cosmos	9,691	beIN SPORTS		

== See also ==
- Soccer Bowl
- MLS Cup
