= Carl Craig (football manager) =

English football manager

Personal information
- Date of birth: October 1965 (age 60–61)
- Place of birth: Newcastle, England

Youth career
- Years: Team
- Newcastle United

Managerial career
- 2010–2015: Minnesota United (assistant)
- 2015–2016: Minnesota United
- 2020–2021: Forward Madison
- 2023–2024: Minneapolis City

Carl Craig is an English football manager. He was formerly the head coach of NASL club Minnesota United.

== Early life ==
Craig spent some time on the books of Newcastle United as a young footballer but fell away from the game in his mid-teens. During the 1980s he was a member of punk bands called Reality Control and The Abductor, and toured with Chumbawamba. Craig then ran a whole foods co-operative with bandmates out of a flat in Newcastle. Craig was also a vegan in this period and his first experience of football coaching was for the team of a workers co-op music club.

== Coaching career ==
Prior to moving to the United States, Craig had acquired his full English FA badge and spent some time working for the FA in the English north-east, as well as for the Newcastle United academy system along with Sheffield Wednesday. After moving to the United States in 1994, Craig progressed through the managerial ranks in the Minnesota area working in youth leagues (including stints as men's varsity coach at Hopkins High School and Minneapolis South High School), then the Premier Development League and National Premier Soccer League before becoming assistant manager of Minnesota United in 2010.

Craig was promoted to head coach of Minnesota United in December 2015. Under Craig's guidance in the 2016 season, Minnesota finished 5th in NASL missing out on the playoffs.

On 1 December 2020, Craig was announced as the head coach and technical director of USL League One club Forward Madison FC.

Craig was appointed manager of USL League Two club Minneapolis City of 24 January 2023. Craig left Minneapolis City on 22 May 2024.

== Managerial record ==
As of Match played 30 October 2021

Team	From	To	Record									
Team	From	To	P	W	D	L	GS	GC	Win %			
Team	From	To	Minnesota United	3 December 2015	30 October 2016	34	12	8	14	44	39	35.29
Forward Madison	1 December 2020	4 November 2021	28	8	12	8	32	34	28.57			
