= Soccer Bowl 2011 =

Soccer match

NASL Championship Series 2011
- Event: Soccer Bowl
NSC Minnesota Stars	Fort Lauderdale Strikers
3	1
- on aggregate

First leg
NSC Minnesota Stars	Fort Lauderdale Strikers
3	1
- Date: October 22, 2011
- Venue: National Sports Center, Blaine, Minnesota
- Man of the Match: Luke Mulholland
- Attendance: 4,511

Second leg
Fort Lauderdale Strikers	NSC Minnesota Stars
0	0
- Date: October 29, 2011
- Venue: Lockhart Stadium, Fort Lauderdale, Florida
- Attendance: 6,849

NASL Championship Series 2011 was the North American Soccer League's postseason championship final of the 2011 season. It was the first championship match held by the new NASL and the first Soccer Bowl since 1984. Also known as the NASL Championship series 2011, the event was contested in a two-game aggregate match between the NSC Minnesota Stars and the Fort Lauderdale Strikers. The first leg was held on October 22, 2011 at National Sports Center in Blaine, Minnesota, while the second on October 29, 2011 at Lockhart Stadium in Fort Lauderdale, Florida.

After a two-day competition, the NSC Minnesota Stars became the 2011 NASL champions, and the first of the new league.

== Background ==
The NSC Minnesota Stars entered the playoffs as the number six seed and defeated the number three seed, Tampa Bay Rowdies, 1–0, in the single-match quarterfinal round. Next they faced the top-seeded, Carolina RailHawks FC in the semifinals. They won the first leg by a score of 1–0, but Carolina won the second leg, 4–3. Since the teams were tied on aggregate, they moved on to 30 minutes of extra time. Since neither side scored in extra time, on to a penalty kick shootout they went. The Stars won the shootout 5–3 to advance to the finals.

The Fort Lauderdale Strikers had a much easier path to the finals. They entered the playoffs as the number four seed and defeated the fifth-seeded, FC Edmonton squad, 5–0, in the single-match quarterfinal round. Next they faced the second-seeded, Puerto Rico Islanders in the semifinals They won the first leg by a score of 3–1 and the second, 2–1, to advance to the finals.

== Game summary ==
=== Championships results ===
Team 1	Aggregate	Team 2	First leg	Second leg	Attendance
NSC Minnesota Stars	3–1	Fort Lauderdale Strikers	3–1	0–0	October 22 National Sports Center 4,511; October 29 Lockhart Stadium 6,849

==== First leg ====
October 22, 2011
6:30 pm CDT
F - 1st Leg

NSC Minnesota Stars	3–1	Fort Lauderdale Strikers
Neil Hlavaty 4'; Luke Mulholland 53'; Lucas Rodriguez 77'	Report	Own Goal 52'

National Sports Center, Blaine, Minnesota
Attendance: 4,511

Minnesota	Fort Lauderdale

==== Second leg ====
October 29, 2011
7:30 pm EDT
F - 2nd Leg

Fort Lauderdale Strikers	0–0	NSC Minnesota Stars
Gerson Mayen (yellow card) 90'	Report

Lockhart Stadium, Fort Lauderdale, Florida
Attendance: 6,849

Fort Lauderdale	Minnesota

2011 NASL Champions: NSC Minnesota Stars

== See also ==
- 2011 in American soccer
- 2011 North American Soccer League season
