= Neil Hlavaty =

American soccer player

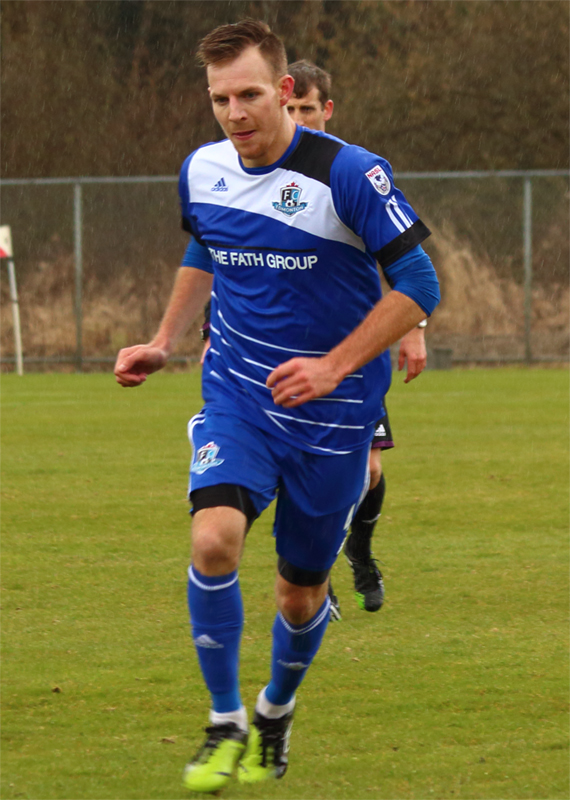

Personal information
- Full name: Neil Hlavaty
- Date of birth: December 27, 1986 (age 39)
- Place of birth: Berwyn, Illinois, United States
- Height: 5 ft 11 in (1.80 m)
- Position: Midfielder

College career
Years	Team	Apps	(Gls)
2005–2007	Boston University Terriers		

Senior career*
Years	Team	Apps	(Gls)
2006–2007	Chicago Fire Premier	23	(4)
2008	Cleveland City Stars	15	(0)
2009	Östers	12	(0)
2009	Jagiellonia Białystok	2	(0)
2010–2012	Minnesota Stars FC	68	(9)
2013–2014	FC Edmonton	51	(4)
2015	Carolina RailHawks	29	(4)
2016	Fort Lauderdale Strikers	0	(0)
2017	Myrtle Beach Mutiny	1	(0)
2018	Richmond Kickers	16	(0)

Managerial career
- 2019–2025: Forward Madison FC (assistant)
- * Club domestic league appearances and goals

Neil Hlavaty (born December 27, 1986) is an American former professional soccer player who was most recently an assistant coach for Forward Madison FC.

== Career ==
=== College and amateur ===
Hlavaty attended Glenbard East High School in Lombard, Illinois, played club soccer for the Chicago Sockers, was a five-year member of the Illinois Olympic Development Program team, and trained with the AC Sparta Prague youth team in the Czech Republic during the spring of 2005.

Hlavaty played three years of college soccer at Boston University. He was selected to the NSCAA All-Northeast Region Second Team and named America East Midfielder of the Year as a junior, and was also selected to the All-America East First Team after his sophomore and junior seasons. after starting in all of BU's 19 matches.

During his college years Hlavaty also played two seasons with Chicago Fire Premier in the USL Premier Development League.

=== Professional ===
Hlavaty signed with Cleveland City Stars of the USL Second Division in late 2007, helping the squad win the USL-2 title in his debut season. After the 2008 campaign, during which Hlavaty recorded 3 assists in 15 matches, he transferred to Swedish outfit Östers for six months.

In October 2009, Hlavaty signed with Polish side Jagiellonia Białystok, and subsequently played in 2 games for the team in the Ekstraklasa in 2009.

On February 25, 2010, Hlavaty returned to the United States when he signed with the NSC Minnesota Stars of the USSF Division 2. He re-signed with the club, now playing in the North American Soccer League, on March 22, 2011.

On November 21, 2012 FC Edmonton announced the signing of Hlavaty for the 2013 season.

On January 9, 2015, Hlavaty signed with NASL club Carolina RailHawks. After one season with Carolina, Hlavaty was traded to Fort Lauderdale Strikers on December 30, 2015, in exchange for James Marcelin. In 2017 he signed on with the Myrtle Beach Mutiny.

== Coaching ==
On January 8, 2019, it was announced that Hlavaty had joined Forward Madison FC as an assistant coach. Hlavaty stayed on with Forward Madison for seven seasons, leaving after the 2025 season.

== Personal ==
Hlavaty is of Czech and Polish descent.

== Honors ==
Jagiellonia Białystok

- Polish Cup: 2009–10

Minnesota Stars

- North American Soccer League: 2011
