= North American Soccer League (2011–2017) =

Former soccer league

- Founded: November 10, 2009; 17 years ago
- First season: 2011; 15 years ago
- Folded: 2017; 9 years ago
- Country: United States
- Other club(s) from: Canada, Puerto Rico
- Confederation: CONCACAF
- Number of clubs: 7–12
- Level on pyramid: 2
- Domestic cup(s): U.S. Open Cup; Canadian Championship; Copa Luis Villarejo
- Last champions: San Francisco Deltas (2017)
- Most championships: New York Cosmos (3 titles)
- Broadcasters: 8 networks: beIN Sports; CBS Sports Network; ESPN3; ESPN Deportes; Gol TV; Eleven Sports Network; Telemundo Deportes; Univision Deportes
- Website: nasl.com

The North American Soccer League (NASL) was a professional men's soccer league based in the United States. The league was named for, but had no connection to, the original North American Soccer League. The later NASL was founded in 2009, and began play in 2011 with eight teams.

From 2013 through 2017, the NASL used a split-season schedule running from April to early November, with a four-week break in July. The spring and fall champions, along with the two teams with best combined spring/fall records met in a four-team single-elimination tournament known as The Championship. The winner of the final claimed the Soccer Bowl trophy. While there was no promotion and relegation with other leagues, former commissioner Bill Peterson repeatedly stated that the league had an interest in introducing promotion and relegation to the pyramid.

During its seven seasons of play from 2011 to 2017, it was sanctioned by the United States Soccer Federation (U.S. Soccer) as a Division II league in the United States soccer league system. In 2017, the Division II status was made provisional, as the league had consistently failed to meet the sanctioning criteria. In 2018, U.S. Soccer outright denied the league Division II status for 2018, as the NASL had not demonstrated a plan for moving into compliance with required standards. The league first postponed and then cancelled its 2018 season, pushing back its potential return to the 2020 season. Its member clubs folded or moved to other leagues, and the NASL effectively became defunct in November 2018.

== Background ==
A top-division professional soccer league known as the North American Soccer League operated from 1968 to early 1985. The modern league used the same name and a similar logo but had no official ties to the original NASL. Several of the modern NASL teams, in particular the Fort Lauderdale Strikers, Tampa Bay Rowdies, and New York Cosmos, shared the same names and similar jersey designs as their original-NASL predecessors. The new league had expressed its affinity to the earlier one, in fact inviting participation from longtime NASL Commissioner Phil Woosnam, who wrote them a letter wishing their success in the new league.

In 1995, the USSF had created its first Professional League Standards (PLS) to regulate the first and second division of soccer in the United States. They set out certain standards that leagues would need to meet in order to be sanctioned, and any league could apply for whichever tier status it could qualify for. The NASL and USSF would be involved in several legal disputes over the PLS.

== History ==
=== Founding ===
On August 27, 2009, multi-national sports company Nike agreed to sell its stake in the United Soccer Leagues (USL) to Rob Hoskins and Alec Papadakis of Atlanta-based NuRock Soccer Holdings, instead of to the USL Team Owner's Association (TOA), a group comprising the owners of several USL First Division clubs and St. Louis Soccer United. After the purchase, several prominent TOA members began to voice their concerns about the state of the league in general, its management structure and ownership model, the leadership of USL president Francisco Marcos, and about the sale of the league to NuRock, which the TOA felt was counter-productive and detrimental to the development of the league.

Within several weeks, a number of TOA member clubs threatened to break away from USL and start their own league. On November 10, 2009, six USL-1 clubs along with St. Louis applied for approval to create a new North American Division 2 league. On November 20, 2009, one team from both USL-1 and USL-2 announced their intentions to join the new league, taking the membership of the new league to nine teams.

The official name of the league was announced on November 23, 2009. According to the official press release, the NASL name was intended to "pay respect to the players, coaches and leaders who were pioneers for men's professional soccer in North America, many of whom remain involved and committed to the growth of the game in various capacities throughout the U.S. and Canada".

The USL issued several press releases questioning the legality of the teams choosing to break away, suggesting that it considered litigation to protect its interests and those of the USL-1 teams from any breach of contract. The USL claimed that the NASL and the TOA ownership group was "interfering with USL-1 team owners that are contractually obligated to participate in the 2010 season" and "made several misleading statements in a variety of press releases to taint the reputation of USL and its long history of developing the sport of soccer."

NASL's inaugural season was expected to begin play in April 2010. However, after announcing that it would not sanction either the NASL or the USL First Division for 2010, U.S. Soccer announced in January 2010 that it would run a temporary USSF Division 2 Professional League for the 2010 season that included 12 teams from both the NASL and USL-1, putting the NASL on hold for at least a year.

=== League begins ===
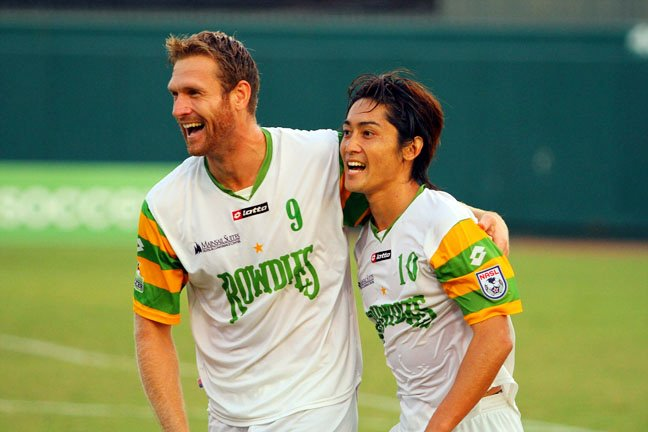
Daniel Antoniuk and Tsuyoshi Yoshitake of the Tampa Bay Rowdies, an inaugural NASL club

Following the 2010 season, NASL admitted its member clubs to meet the new Division 2 standards set out by U.S. Soccer. The NASL was provisionally approved by U.S. Soccer on November 21, 2010. The provisional sanctioning was briefly revoked by U.S. Soccer in January 2011 due to the collapse of two of the ownership groups involved with NASL and serious questions about several others but was reinstated before the 2011 season.

As part of the re-organization that established the NASL as Division II, the USSF updated its Professional League Standards, in order to keep up with the growth of the sport and population growth in the United States since 1995. Another update to the PLS took effect in 2014, while a further update was discussed in 2015 but was dropped.

=== Traffic Sports scandal ===
From the beginning of the league, Brazilian-based sports company Traffic Sports Marketing was a significant investor in the new league. Traffic Sports Marketing was heavily involved in its operations. Traffic was an early investor in four of the league's clubs, and the president of its American subsidiary, Aaron Davidson, also served as the chairman of the NASL's board of governors. Both Traffic and Davidson himself were implicated in the 2015 FIFA corruption case, and both would eventually plead guilty to racketeering, conspiracy, and wire-fraud conspiracy. Traffic Sports continued to hold a large amount of stock in the NASL until the league finally arranged for a sale to an unnamed buyer in November 2016.

=== Dispute with USSF and legal action ===
From the league's founding, the USSF had demonstrated a willingness to work with leagues who could show they were moving into compliance with the PLS; the NASL applied for, and was granted, waivers for specific provisions every year of its existence.

In September 2015, the NASL announced its intent to challenge MLS and secure Division I status, despite never having met the criteria for Division II. To that end, the league sent a letter to U.S. Soccer president, Sunil Gulati, objecting to proposed updates to the Division I PLS. NASL took issue with three proposed changes: increasing the minimum stadium size to 15,000, increasing the minimum number of teams to 16, and changing the minimum population required in 75% of the teams from a population of 1 million to 2 million. NASL accused U.S. Soccer of colluding with MLS to protect MLS's monopoly as the only Division I league in the United States. The USSF denied the league's Division I application on March 30, 2016, but continued to grant waivers for the NASL to play in Division II.

In September 2017, it was reported that after having granted provisional Division II status to both the NASL and the MLS-backed United Soccer League in 2016, that U.S. Soccer had voted to stop extending PSL standards waivers to the NASL, resulting in the loss of its Division II status. NASL stated that it "does not believe that the federation acted in the best interest of the sport. U.S. Soccer's decision negatively affects many stakeholders in soccer: fans, players, coaches, referees, business partners, and the NASL club owners who have invested tens of millions of dollars promoting the sport. The decision also jeopardizes the thousands of jobs created by the NASL and its member clubs." For its part, the USSF explained its decision was the result of the NASL's continued failure to meet agreed-upon league standards, particularly that "(d)espite multiple chances, NASL has not even come up with a plan for eventual compliance with the Division II standards."

On September 19, 2017, NASL filed suit against U.S. Soccer citing antitrust violations related to the change of sanctioning criteria. The decision to pursue the lawsuit was not unanimous among NASL clubs. FC Edmonton was not involved in the lawsuit, having "found out about the lawsuit over the telephone"; and North Carolina FC did not support the lawsuit. The U.S. District Court for the Eastern District of New York ruled against the NASL's motion for a preliminary injunction on November 4, 2017, and the U.S. Court of Appeals for the Second Circuit denied an appeal February 23, 2018.

Following the District Court ruling, the NASL announced it would move to the "international calendar", playing from August through June. The announcement was met with skepticism, with commentators pointing out the difficulty in playing a winter schedule in northern markets such as New York or Indiana. Others characterized it as a desperation move, suggesting the change had more to do with the NASL not being able to field enough teams to play its regular spring schedule and that the league had not worked through the "logistical nightmare" of such a schedule change.

On February 27, 2018, the league announced that the 2018 season had been canceled in the wake of the court ruling. They were looking for ways to return in 2020. At that time, the New York Cosmos, Miami FC and Jacksonville Armada, chose to participate in the National Premier Soccer League for the 2018 season while the NASL's future was being determined. FC Edmonton briefly stopped operations before joining the newly formed Canadian Premier League in advance of the 2019 inaugural season, while San Diego 1904 FC left the league and tried unsuccessfully to join the USL.

On February 3, 2025, the jury unanimously ruled against the NASL, ending the lawsuit.

=== Demise ===
After initially postponing the 2018 season, the league was denied a preliminary injunction to prevent the loss of its Division II sanctioning and announced it had canceled its 2018 season and hoped to return for a 2019 season. By July 2018, the league pushed back its potential return to the 2020 season. In November 2018, two of the four remaining NASL clubs announced that they would launch a new professional league in 2019 associated with the National Premier Soccer League and the NASL effectively became defunct.

== Competition format ==
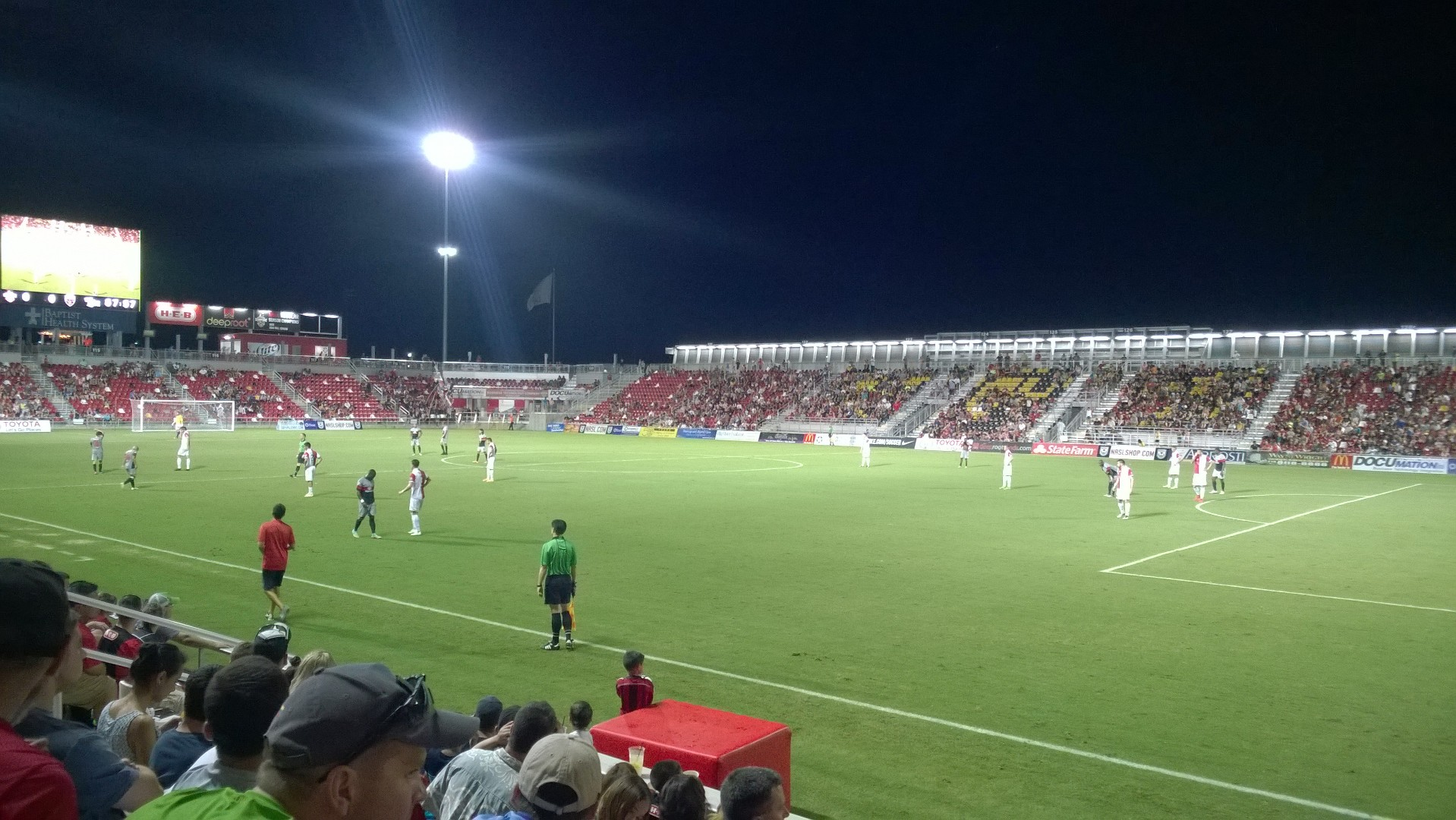
Toyota Field in San Antonio, Texas, host of Soccer Bowl 2014.

The NASL began playing a split-season format in 2013. Similar to Liga MX, Central, and South American leagues, the schedule consisted of two competitions, Spring and Fall, with the winner of the Spring season earning the right to host the Fall champion in a one-game playoff, the Soccer Bowl. In 2014 the postseason was altered again with the introduction of The Championship: The NASL Spring Season and Fall Season champions were joined in the semi-finals of The Championship by the two clubs with the next best overall records from both seasons combined. The semi-final winners competed in The Championship Final, with "Soccer Bowl" being the name of the trophy itself. The NASL Spring Season and Fall Season champions would each host a semi-final. The number one seed was awarded to whichever of the Spring or Fall champions posts the better combined regular season record. The number three and number four seeds were awarded to the next two clubs with the best overall records from both seasons combined. Clubs will retain their seeding throughout the postseason. The top-seeded semi-final winner hosted The Championship final. If the same club won both seasons, the clubs with the second, third and fourth best overall records from both seasons combined qualified for The Championship.

The Spring Season ran from early April until July 4, and following a one-month break, the Fall season ran from early August until early November.

The split-season model had several intended benefits for NASL. A break in July that coincides with the international transfer window allowed teams to acquire (or sell) players during the summer, providing ample time for new players to become acquainted with their new club and league. Secondly, NASL teams could use this break to generate additional revenue by hosting international friendlies or going on tour. In prior NASL seasons, the competition featured 8 teams playing a 28-game regular season schedule, with 14 home and 14 away matches, meeting each opponent four times. The playoffs consisted of the top six clubs, with the first and second-ranked teams receiving a bye until the semi-final round. The bottom four competed in a knockout round before advancing to the semi-finals. Both the semi-final and the final rounds were played over two-legs, the winner advancing on aggregate goals.

In July 2013, NASL teams took advantage of the break afforded by the new split-season schedule to host several international friendlies, including several matches against Mexican, Brazilian, and Guatemalan teams, while the NY Cosmos traveled to London to play lower division English teams.

Similar to other American sports leagues (but unlike many European soccer leagues), NASL did not have promotion or relegation for its member clubs. The champion of Division II NASL was not promoted to Division I Major League Soccer, and the team finishing last in NASL was not relegated. Two NASL clubs did switch leagues to MLS (Montreal Impact in 2012, Minnesota United FC in 2017) as expansion teams following an application.

The NASL did not have a salary cap, limited active rosters to 30 players, and limited teams to seven foreign players.

=== Other competitions ===
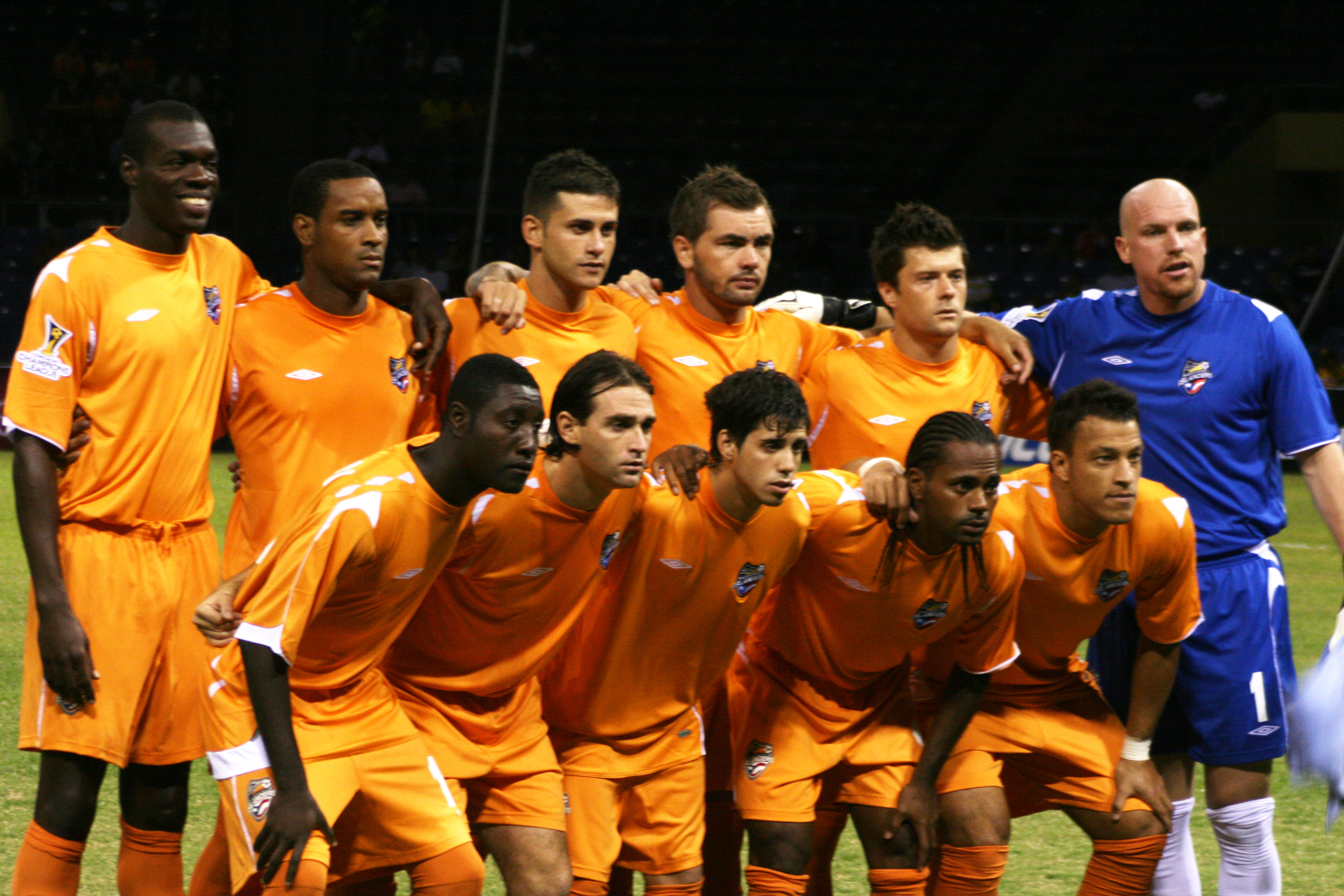
The Puerto Rico Islanders reached the semi-finals of the 2008–09 CONCACAF Champions League.

Teams playing in the NASL represented three separate CONCACAF members, the United States, Canada and Puerto Rico. NASL's U.S.-based teams played in the U.S. Open Cup, the winner of which provides one of the four U.S. representatives in the CONCACAF Champions League. The NASL did not participate in the 2011 U.S. Open Cup during the league's first season, but joined the tournament in 2012 to some success as the Carolina RailHawks reached the quarterfinals that year. In 2014, both the Carolina RailHawks and the Atlanta Silverbacks reached the Open Cup quarterfinals. The league's Canadian teams, FC Edmonton and Ottawa Fury FC, participated in the Canadian Championship. This tournament consists of the Canadian Soccer Association's professional clubs, the winner representing Canada in the Champions League.

NASL teams also occasionally played in international competitions including friendlies during the league's summer break. Additionally, the Puerto Rico Islanders were invited to participate in the CFU Club Championship by the Caribbean Football Union representing Puerto Rico, participation in which allowed them to qualify for the Champions League. The Islanders competed in Champions League twice during their time in NASL.

== Clubs ==
Club	City	Stadium	Capacity	First season	Final season	Fate
Atlanta Silverbacks	Atlanta, Georgia	Atlanta Silverbacks Park	5,000	2011	2015	Folded
California United FC	Fullerton, California	Titan Stadium (Note: Soccer-specific stadium)	10,000	never played		Joined NISA (2019)
FC Edmonton	Edmonton, Alberta	Clarke Stadium (Note: Shared facility; not a soccer-specific stadium)	5,000	2011	2017	Joined the CPL (2019)
Fort Lauderdale Strikers	Fort Lauderdale, Florida	Central Broward Stadium	20,450	2011	2016	Folded
Indy Eleven	Indianapolis, Indiana	Carroll Stadium	12,100	2014	2017	Joined the USL Championship
Jacksonville Armada FC	Jacksonville, Florida	Hodges Stadium	9,400	2015	2017	Joined the NPSL
Miami FC	University Park, Florida (Miami)	Riccardo Silva Stadium	20,000	2016	2017	Joined the NPSL (2019)
Minnesota United FC	Blaine, Minnesota (Minneapolis)	National Sports Center	8,500	2011	2016	Joined MLS
Montreal Impact	Montreal, Quebec	Saputo Stadium	13,034	2011		Joined MLS
New York Cosmos	Hempstead / Brooklyn, New York	James M. Shuart Stadium / MCU Park (Note: Baseball park stadium)	11,929 / 7,000	Fall 2013	2017	Joined NISA (2020)
North Carolina FC	Cary, North Carolina (Raleigh)	Sahlen's Stadium at WakeMed Soccer Park	10,000	2011	2017	Joined the USL Championship
Oklahoma City FC	Yukon, Oklahoma (Oklahoma City)	Miller Stadium	6,000	never played		Abandoned
Ottawa Fury FC	Ottawa, Ontario	TD Place Stadium	24,000	2014	2016	Joined the USL Championship
Puerto Rico FC	Bayamón, Puerto Rico	Juan Ramón Loubriel Stadium	22,000	Fall 2016	2017	Folded
Puerto Rico Islanders	Bayamón, Puerto Rico	Juan Ramón Loubriel Stadium	22,000	2011	2012	Folded
Rayo OKC	Yukon, Oklahoma (Oklahoma City)	Miller Stadium	6,000	2016		Folded
San Antonio Scorpions	San Antonio, Texas	Toyota Field	8,296	2012	2015	Folded
San Diego 1904 FC	San Diego, California	Torero Stadium	6,000	never played		Joined NISA (2019)
San Francisco Deltas	San Francisco, California	Kezar Stadium	10,000	2017		Folded
Tampa Bay Rowdies	St. Petersburg, Florida	Al Lang Stadium (Note: Redesigned ballpark for permanent soccer use)	7,227	2011	2016	Joined the USL Championship
Virginia Cavalry FC	Ashburn, Virginia	Edelman Financial Field	4,000	never played		Abandoned

=== Team timeline ===
Club folded Club moved to MLS Club moved to USL Club moved to other league

=== Founding members ===
With provisional approval from U.S. Soccer to begin play as a Division 2 league in 2011, eight clubs were officially confirmed to launch the inaugural season: Atlanta Silverbacks, Carolina RailHawks, FC Edmonton, Fort Lauderdale Strikers (formerly Miami FC), Montreal Impact, NSC Minnesota Stars, Puerto Rico Islanders and FC Tampa Bay.

Four of these eight teams – the Carolina RailHawks, Miami FC, Minnesota United FC (formerly Minnesota Thunder/Stars) and Montreal Impact – played in the USL First Division in 2009, and were among the set of TOA teams that initiated the original breakaway from the USL. FC Tampa Bay had been scheduled to be a 2010 USL-1 expansion franchise, but switched to the NASL shortly after NASL was officially formed. The Atlanta Silverbacks played competitively in USL-1 in 2008, and spent 2009 on hiatus from the league prior to joining the NASL. FC Edmonton was an expansion team that was founded in 2010 and joined the Canadian Premier League in 2019 after suspending operations in late 2017. The Puerto Rico Islanders played in the USL in the 2010 season.

Several teams expected to join NASL did not play in NASL during the 2011 inaugural season. Crystal Palace Baltimore of the USL Second Division had planned to join the NASL, but announced in late 2010 that it would not play in NASL in 2011 due to a necessary restructuring. The Rochester Rhinos of the USL First Division initially joined the NASL on November 30, 2009, but jumped to the new USL Pro instead. AC St. Louis, part of the initial TOA group that formed NASL, closed in late 2010 after only one season due to financial difficulties. The Vancouver Whitecaps did not play in NASL in 2011 because the Vancouver Whitecaps FC joined MLS in 2011. The Minnesota Thunder ceased operations due to financial problems, and were replaced by the NSC Minnesota Stars under different ownership.

On March 25, 2015, it was announced that founding team Minnesota would become a Major League Soccer expansion side in 2017.

When the owner of the Atlanta Silverbacks was unable to find a buyer for the club, the league assumed operations for the 2015 season. On January 11, 2016, the NASL announced that it was also unable to secure a new ownership group, and the club ceased operations.

On October 25, 2016, the Tampa Bay Rowdies announced that they would be moving to the United Soccer League for the 2017 season.

=== Expansion teams ===
Progression of league size
Season	# Teams
2011	8
2012	8
Spring 2013	7
Fall 2013	8
Spring 2014	10
Fall 2014	10
Spring 2015	11
Fall 2015	11
Spring 2016	11
Fall 2016	12
Spring 2017	8
Fall 2017	8

The league continued with eight teams in 2012, losing one team and adding one team, with the Montreal Impact joining Major League Soccer and the San Antonio Scorpions joining NASL as an expansion side. The league played its 2013 spring season with seven teams, as the Puerto Rico Islanders suspended operations with uncertainty regarding a government subsidy. The New York Cosmos restored the league to eight teams when it joined for the fall 2013 season, playing its home games at Hofstra University's James M. Shuart Stadium.

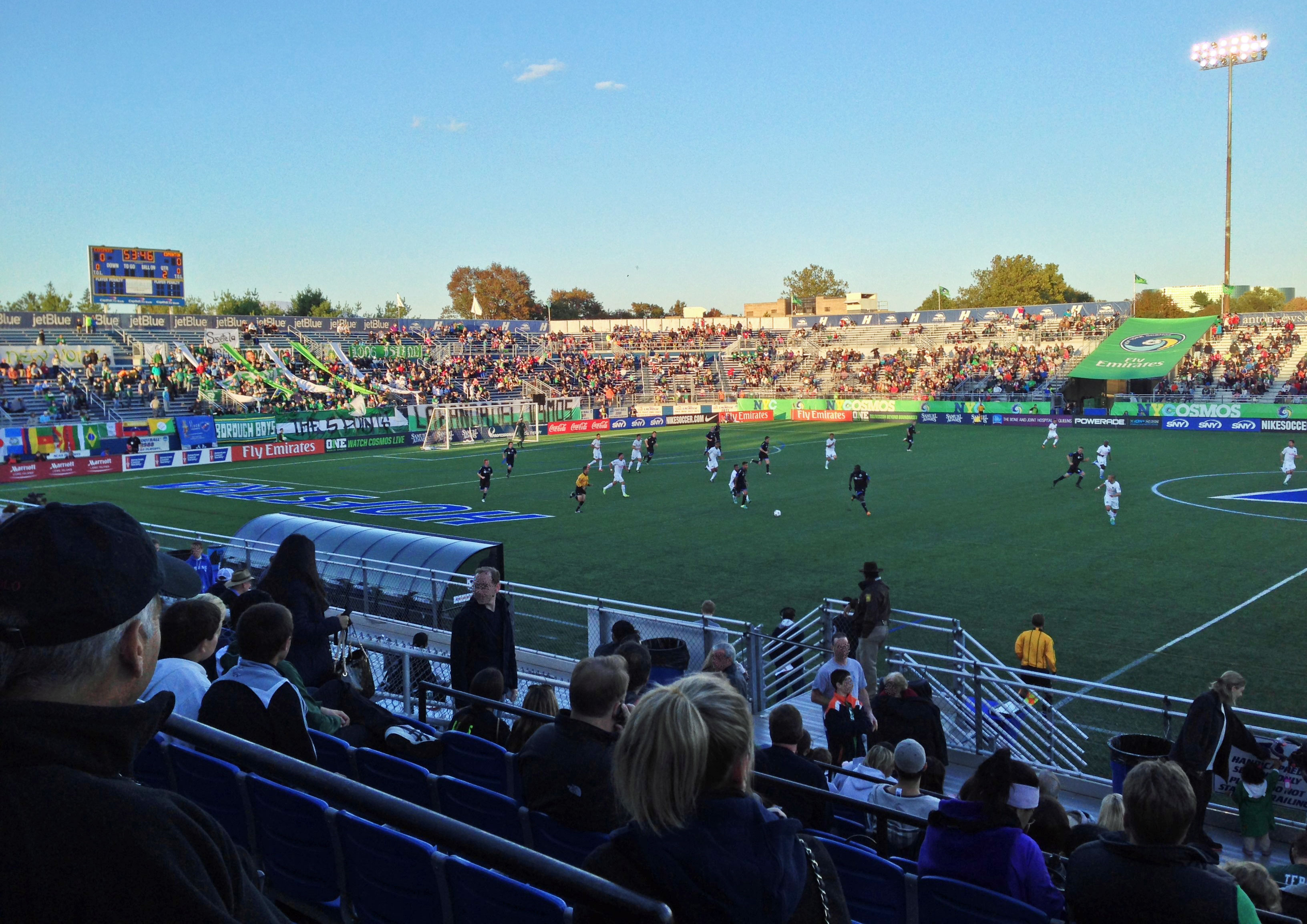
5,624 fans watch an October 2013 match at Hofstra University between the New York Cosmos and visiting FC Edmonton

NASL's expansion into New York marked the first time the league expanded into a city where an MLS team was already present, marking the beginning of a shift in NASL expansion strategy, with NASL later considering expanding into other large markets with MLS teams, such as the northern Virginia suburbs of Washington DC, and Los Angeles.

The NASL added two teams for the 2014 season: the Ottawa Fury FC and Indy Eleven of Indianapolis. The Ottawa Fury moved from the USL Premier Development League following the refurbishment of TD Place Stadium. The Indy Eleven played at Indiana University – Purdue University Indianapolis but planned to complete their own stadium. Virginia Cavalry FC was originally announced as a 2014 expansion team to be based in the planned Edelman Financial Field in Ashburn, Virginia, but could not find either a suitable venue or a stable ownership group.

In July 2013, the NASL awarded two new expansion franchises to begin play in 2015: Jacksonville Armada FC and Oklahoma City FC. Jacksonville plays at the Baseball Grounds of Jacksonville and hopes to build its own stadium. Oklahoma City FC did not join the league. An NASL team in Oklahoma City was eventually announced for a 2016 launch when Spanish club Rayo Vallecano launched Rayo OKC in November 2015.

In 2014, the NASL indicated its vision to grow to 18 to 20 teams by 2018. Former NASL Commissioner Bill Peterson expressed interest in Hartford, which had been home to the Connecticut Bicentennials in the previous version of the NASL. However, the priority remained to add more teams in the West, Midwest and Prairies, with an eye on placing teams in the 25 largest metropolitan areas without professional soccer teams in order to tap into greater media exposure and sponsor interest. NASL expansion conversations took place with interested parties from San Francisco, Los Angeles, Orange County, San Diego, and Las Vegas. Also, the owners of Detroit City FC expressed a desire to join the NASL or USL if additional investors could be found. In addition, Peterson criticized the MLS expansion plans in cities with existing NASL teams (Miami, Atlanta, Minneapolis, and San Antonio), suggesting a turf war and increased competition between the two leagues.

In May 2015, the NASL announced that the twelfth team in the league would be Miami FC, in Miami, Florida. Owned by international entrepreneur Riccardo Silva and former Italian international Paolo Maldini, the team began play in 2016. In June 2015, professional basketball player Carmelo Anthony, announced that his new club Puerto Rico FC would join the league. The team began play in the 2016 NASL fall season.

On December 22, 2015, it was announced that the City of San Antonio and Bexar County had purchased Toyota Field and S.T.A.R. Soccer Complex. Along with this came an agreement for Spurs Sports and Entertainment, owners of the San Antonio Spurs, to operate the facilities and field a team in the United Soccer League, effectively folding the San Antonio Scorpions.

In February 2016, former Indy Eleven president Peter Wilt announced his ambition to create an NASL team in Chicago. Wilt had been the first president and general manager of Major League Soccer's Chicago Fire. The ownership group announced that the NASL Chicago club would not be called the Chicago Sting, but works were in progress to secure short-term and long-term stadium options. The efforts were combined with exploring investors and supporter ownership structures.

In February 2016, it was announced that the San Francisco Deltas would join the NASL in 2017. Despite a championship season, the Deltas folded at the end of 2017.

In October 2016, the Ottawa Fury FC announced that they would be moving to the USL for the 2017 season. At the time of their announcement, it had been reported that the Fury were losing approximately $2 million per year during their time in the NASL.

On May 10, 2017, it was announced that California United FC would join the league in Spring 2018 and play its home games at Titan Stadium on the campus of Cal State Fullerton. Following the cancellation of the 2018 season, the team announced on February 28, 2018, that it would explore professional league options for 2019. On March 17, 2018, the NASL acknowledged that California United had withdrawn from the NASL.

On June 25, 2017, it was announced that a San Diego 1904 FC franchise would be joining the league in Spring 2018. The club's founders include professional soccer players Demba Ba, Eden Hazard, Yohan Cabaye and Moussa Sow. The club intends to build a soccer complex somewhere in San Diego's North County and will play its games at the University of San Diego in the meantime. However, after the league announced it had cancelled the 2018 NASL season, the expansion team announced that they had quietly resigned from the NASL the month before and were finalizing an agreement to join the United Soccer League in 2019.

Indy Eleven announced on January 10, 2018, that they had left the NASL and would begin play in the USL starting with the 2018 season.

== Organization ==
=== Ownership ===
The North American Soccer League operated as a group of independent club owners as opposed to the single-entity structure of Major League Soccer. The league itself was owned and operated by its member teams through the board of governors, consisting of a representative from each member team. The board oversaw the league rules and regulations, and governed the expansion and commercial strategy of the league. In accordance with the USSF's Professional League Standards for the second division, the league required that each club have a lead shareholder that holds at least 35% ownership in the club and had a net worth of at least $20M.

The NASL issued Class A and Class B stock. Each club owned Class A voting shares, while the majority of Class B shares were owned by Traffic Sports Marketing, as the primary investor in the league. Class B shares did not have voting rights but did give Traffic certain veto power over the league's decisions.

=== Structure ===
The NASL had a decentralized business model, in which many responsibilities that would fall to the league in other North American sports, such as marketing, were instead borne by the clubs.

This focus on "independence" as a key element of the league's identity caused difficulties at times. The Cosmos vetoed league-wide uniform and TV contracts, contracts would have brought the league as a whole more money, because the team thought it could make more for itself on its own. The league also lacked an Expansion Committee, for developing new markets and vetting potential new owners, until January 2017.

=== Commissioner ===
David Downs was named league commissioner effective April 4, 2011, just four days before the league's first match. Downs had previously worked for ABC Sports where he had secured the U.S. television rights to every World Cup from 1994 to 2014, worked for Univision, and from 2007 through 2010 had been executive director of the unsuccessful U.S. Bid Committee to bring the 2018 or 2022 FIFA World Cup to the United States. NASL began regular league play in April 2011 with eight members comprising former clubs from the USL First Division, the USL Second Division, plus expansion sides.

Citing a desire to return to his home in New York, Downs resigned after the end of the 2012 season. Bill Peterson, formerly the Senior VP of AEG Sports and managing director of the Home Depot Center from 2000 to 2006, replaced Downs as commissioner.

Peterson left the NASL in January 2017 and was replaced by Rishi Sehgal as Interim Commissioner. Sehgal served in that position until August 31, 2024. On September 1, 2024, Victoria Anderson was elected Commissioner of NASL and currently serves in the position.

=== Sponsorship ===
Match ball
Manufacturer	Seasons
Joma	2011–2013
Voit	2014–2015
Under Armour	2016–2017

The league reached a deal with Seiko to serve as the official timekeeper of the NASL starting with the 2014 season. Seiko branding was prominent on the fourth official's substitution and timing boards, on goal line advertising boards, on the broadcast game clock and within the league's official website NASL.com.

The NASL decided early on to seek a league-wide uniform contract, similar to that employed by all high-level American sports leagues, including Major League Soccer, the NBA, NFL, NHL, and MLB. In the end, the Cosmos settled for a uniform deal that saw them buy their own uniforms from Nike rather than have the manufacturer supply them as part of a sponsorship deal.

Some NASL teams were able to attract shirt sponsors. The Cosmos signed Middle Eastern air carrier Emirates from the Fall 2013 through Fall 2015 seasons for "about $1M" annually. FC Edmonton signed Sears Financial as a jersey sponsor, and North Carolina FC had Blue Cross as their jersey sponsor. Toyota's shirt sponsorship of the Scorpions was tied into several other sponsorship programs involving the team and team ownership. Indy Eleven announced on October 1, 2013, that they had reached a three-year deal with Honda Manufacturing of Indiana LLC and central Indiana Honda dealers worth $1M annually to be the shirt sponsor for the team, the deal was on par with the one announced by the Cosmos earlier in the year. The Rowdies announced they had reach a sponsorship agreement with Seminole Hard Rock Hotel and Casino Tampa for the 2014 season.

Beyond shirt sponsorship and kit production, teams had varying success in establishing sponsorship packages with local and national brands. The San Antonio Scorpions were able to land numerous sponsorship arrangements with the opening of Toyota Field including an innovative sponsorship by CST brands Valero Corner Stores. The sponsorship arrangement with Valero involved stadium branding and sponsorship of all corner kicks at home games.

== Media and digital coverage ==
The NASL originally sought a full-season league-wide television contract, similar to those of other professional sports leagues. This plan was vetoed by the New York Cosmos, who instead chose to partner with One World Sports in 2015; Cosmos chairman Seamus O'Brien was also chairman of the network's parent company.

NASL began a relationship with ESPN3 to broadcast selected games beginning with Soccer Bowl 2013. Starting in 2015, ESPN3 began airing over 100 league matches in 75 countries.

For the 2016 season, One World Sports aired all Cosmos matches and an additional game of the week, on Saturdays in the spring season and on Wednesdays in the fall season. Additionally for 2016, beIN Sports and CBS Sports Network each began airing a game of the week. Miami FC made a further deal with Gol TV to televise all games not carried by other providers.

For the 2017 spring season One World Sports, CBS Sports Network, and Gol TV did not return, but beIN Sports did return, airing a national game of the week featuring at least one appearance by all eight teams. The San Francisco Deltas broadcast all their home games worldwide via Twitter. ESPN3 continued to stream all games not broadcast by beIN Sports or Twitter. In addition to the national deals, many clubs had local broadcast deals.

== Champions ==
NASL trophy winners
Season	The Championship (Soccer Bowl Trophy)	Regular season	Spring championship	Fall championship
2011	NSC Minnesota Stars	Carolina RailHawks	–	–
2012	Tampa Bay Rowdies	San Antonio Scorpions	–	–
2013	New York Cosmos	Carolina RailHawks	Atlanta Silverbacks	New York Cosmos
2014	San Antonio Scorpions	Minnesota United FC	Minnesota United FC	San Antonio Scorpions
2015	New York Cosmos	New York Cosmos	New York Cosmos	Ottawa Fury
2016	New York Cosmos	New York Cosmos	Indy Eleven	New York Cosmos
2017	San Francisco Deltas	Miami FC	Miami FC	Miami FC

Notes

- Spring and Fall Championships not instituted until 2013 season
- NASL Championship Series contested 2011–2012

=== Championship results ===
Season	Champions	Score	Runners–up	Venue	Attendance
2011	NSC Minnesota Stars	3–1	Fort Lauderdale Strikers	National Sports Center; Lockhart Stadium	4,511; 6,849
2012	Tampa Bay Rowdies	3–3 (p)	Minnesota Stars	National Sports Center; Al Lang Stadium	4,642; 6,208
2013	New York Cosmos	1–0	Atlanta Silverbacks	Atlanta Silverbacks Park	7,211
2014	San Antonio Scorpions	2–1	Fort Lauderdale Strikers	Toyota Field	7,847
2015	New York Cosmos	3–2	Ottawa Fury FC	Shuart Stadium	10,166
2016	New York Cosmos	0–0 (p)	Indy Eleven	Belson Stadium	2,150
2017	San Francisco Deltas	2–0	New York Cosmos	Kezar Stadium	9,691

Note: The champion was determined by a two-leg series in 2011 and 2012, before switching playoff formats in 2013.

== NASL club honors ==
NASL club records only include performance while team competed in the NASL. Order based on major honors (championships).

Team	Seasons	NASL playoffs		NASL regular season			Domestic (USOC, CC, CFUCC)		Total honors	Major honors / championships
Team	Seasons	Championship winner	Championship runner-up	Regular season winner	Split season winner (2013–17)	Regular season runner-up	Winner	USOC – top NASL club	Total honors	Major honors / championships
New York Cosmos	4.5	3	1	2	3	–	–	1	10	5
San Antonio Scorpions	4	1	–	1	1	1	–	1	5	2
Minnesota United FC	6	1	1	1	1	–	–	1	5	2
North Carolina FC	7	–	–	2	–	–	–	2	4	2
Puerto Rico Islanders	2	–	–	–	–	1	2	n/a	3	2
Miami FC	2	–	–	1	2	–	–	–	3	1
Tampa Bay Rowdies	6	1	–	–	–	2	–	–	3	1
San Francisco Deltas	1	1	–	–	–	1	–	–	2	1
Ottawa Fury FC	3	–	1	–	1	1	–	n/a	3	0
Indy Eleven	4	–	1	–	1	1	–	–	3	0
Atlanta Silverbacks	5	–	1	–	1	–	–	1	3	0
Fort Lauderdale Strikers	6	–	2	–	–	–	–	1	3	0

=== Individual records ===
Goals
Rank	Player	Goals
1	(Brazil) Pablo Campos	53
2	(United States) Christian Ramirez	50
3	(Brazil) Stefano Pinho	38
4	(United States) Brian Shriver	37
5	(Bulgaria) Georgi Hristov	34
6	(United States) Jaime Chavez	31
7	(Northern Ireland) Daryl Fordyce	30
8	(Jamaica) Lance Laing	27
8	(United States) Tom Heinemann	27
10	(South Africa) Ty Shipalane	26
10	(Libya) Éamon Zayed	26
10	(United States) Mike Ambersley	26

Assists
Rank	Player	Assists
1	(Bulgaria) Georgi Hristov	25
2	(South Africa) Ty Shipalane	22
3	(Jamaica) Lance Laing	20
3	(United States) Jaime Chavez	20
5	(Turks and Caicos Islands) Billy Forbes	19
6	(United States) Nazmi Albadawi	18
6	(United States) Dylan Mares	18
6	(El Salvador) Andrés Flores	18
9	(United States) Kevin Venegas	17
10	(United States) Christian Ramirez	15

Minutes played
Rank	Player	MP
1	(United States) Aaron Pitchkolan	14,674
2	(United States) Justin Davis	13,262
3	(Jamaica) Lance Laing	11,928
4	(United States) Connor Tobin	11,750
5	(United States) Frank Sanfilippo	11,381
6	(Northern Ireland) Albert Watson	11,336
7	(Puerto Rico) Kupono Low	10,951
8	(United States) Jimmy Maurer	10,896
9	(United States) Brian Shriver	10,626
10	(United States) Neil Hlavaty	10,450

Regular season only.

=== Rivalry cups ===
Some NASL teams participated in rivalry matches. Supporters of Minnesota United FC and FC Edmonton created the Flyover Cup, a nod to the clubs' geographic location with respect to the rest of the league.

Starting in 2010 when the Tampa Bay Rowdies returned, the Florida Derby was revived with the creation of the Coastal Cup with the Fort Lauderdale Strikers. The Rowdies claimed the first four Coastal Cups, with the Strikers winning the Cup for the first time in 2014. In 2015 Jacksonville Armada FC made the competition three-way, and the expansion Miami FC made it a four-club competition in 2016.

Derby name	Most wins	Titles	Other club(s)	Titles
Coastal Cup	Tampa Bay Rowdies	5	Fort Lauderdale Strikers, Jacksonville Armada FC, Miami FC	2
Flyover Cup	Minnesota United FC	3	FC Edmonton	1

=== Woosnam Cup ===
Woosnam Cup
- Awarded for: Regular season champion
- Country: Puerto Rico
- Presented by: NASL supporters groups
- First award: 2011 (retroactively from 2013)
- Final award: 2014

Highlights
- Most awards: Carolina Railhawks (2)
- Final winner: Minnesota United
- Website: www.woosnamcup.com

In 2013, a coalition of supporters groups proposed an annual award called the Woosnam Cup to be given to the team with the best regular season, as determined by the NASL points system on aggregate between the Spring and Fall championship seasons in year. Akin to the Supporters' Shield in Major League Soccer or the Presidents' Trophy of the NHL, it would have been awarded each year in order to recognize overall consistent performance through the entire year. It was intended to replace the regular season champion trophy that was awarded by the league itself in 2011 and 2012. Prior years' winners, dating back to the league's first season, were retroactively recognized on the award's website.

The trophy was to be a collaboration between twenty-one supporters groups, representing supporters of eleven of the twelve then-current or announced NASL clubs. They planned to collect money from each group, and design and commission a traveling trophy to be loaned to the winning team each year.

The award derived its name from the long time Commissioner of the original NASL, who died during the summer of 2013. When the supporters failed to get permission from Woosnam's family to use his name, it was changed to "Supporters Cup". The "North American Supporter's Trophy" or "Nasty" was floated as a possible replacement name, but that was never reflected on the trophy's website or social media.

No physical trophy was ever made or presented to the clubs, and the award itself was abandoned following the 2014 season.

== Awards ==
- NASL Player of the Month
- NASL Best XI
- NASL Golden Ball Award
- NASL Golden Boot Award
- NASL Golden Glove Award
- NASL Coach of the Year Award
- NASL Fair Play Award
- NASL Goal of the Year Award

== Attendance ==
Stadium attendances were a significant source of regular income for the NASL and its clubs. The average and total attendances are listed below.

NASL regular season average attendance (excludes playoffs)
Season	ATL	CAR	EDM	FTL	IND	JAX	MIA	MIN	MTL	NY	OTT	PRFC	PRI	SA	SF	TB	NASL avg.	Ref
**2011**	2,866	3,353	1,817	3,769	–	–	–	1,676	**11,507**	–	–	–	2,161	–	–	3,010	3,770	
**2012**	4,505	3,883	1,525	3,615	–	–	–	2,796	–	–	–	–	1,864	**9,176**	–	3,116	3,806	
**Spring 2013**	5,042	4,707	2,059	4,314	–	–	–	5,338	–	–	–	–	–	**7,140**	–	4,037	4,662	
**Fall 2013**	4,364	4,709	2,761	4,223	–	–	–	3,680	–	**6,849**	–	–	–	6,763	–	4,050	4,675	
**Spring 2014**	4,730	5,364	3,569	3,825	**10,465**	–	–	5,157	–	4,323	2,684	–	–	6,476	–	4,998	5,267	
**Fall 2014**	3,751	4,180	3,297	4,177	**10,465**	–	–	9,234	–	4,915	4,961	–	–	6,909	–	4,300	5,619	
**Spring 2015**	4,760	5,160	2,764	6,351	**10,400**	9,758	–	9,192	–	6,719	4,377	–	–	6,477	–	5,700	6,514	
**Fall 2015**	–	–	–	–	–	–	–	–	–	–	–	–	–	6,866	–	–	–	
**2015**	4,024	4,539	2,889	4,518	**9,809**	7,927	–	8,748	–	4,984	5,406	–	–	6,736	–	5,648	5,912	
**2016**	–	4,856	2,020	1,361	8,362	3,558	5,205	**8,570**	–	3,451	5,521	3,567	–	–	–	5,820	4,684	
**2017**	–	4,489	3,408	–	**8,954**	3,035	5,147	–	–	4,789	–	3,597	–	–	2,564	–	4,486	
**Bold** denotes league's highest attendance that season.

== See also ==
- Soccer in the United States
- Professional sports leagues in the United States
