= Minnesota United FC (2010–2016) =

American soccer team (2010–2016)

- Full name: Minnesota United Football Club
- Nickname: The Loons
- Founded: 2010
- Dissolved: 2016 (MLS 2017)
- Stadium: National Sports Center; Blaine, Minnesota
- Capacity: 10,000
- Owner: Bill McGuire
- Head coach: Carl Craig
- League: North American Soccer League
- 2016: Spring: 4th Fall: 8th Combined: 5th Playoffs: DNQ
- Website: mnufc.com
Home colors	Away colors

Minnesota United FC was a lower-tier American professional soccer team based in the Minneapolis-Saint Paul area in Minnesota. Founded in 2010 as NSC Minnesota and later known as Minnesota Stars FC, the team played in the North American Soccer League (NASL), a professional league sanctioned by the United States Soccer Federation. The team won the 2011 NASL championship. On March 25, 2015, Major League Soccer announced it had awarded an expansion franchise to the Twin Cities and McGuire's ownership group to begin play in 2017. The team played its home games at the National Sports Center in Blaine, Minnesota, 18 miles north of Minneapolis. The team's colors were sky blue, gray, and black with a blue accent.

== History ==
The National Sports Center began considering fielding a Division 2 men's professional soccer team in December 2009. The then current team, the Minnesota Thunder, were tenants of the National Sports Center and were struggling through financial difficulties. In January 2010, the National Sports Center announced they would field a new team to replace the Minnesota Thunder. The Thunder at the time were not officially folded but were facing financial ruin. Following a team-naming contest, the National Sports Center (NSC) announced the official team name would be NSC Minnesota, with the team nickname being Stars on February 5, 2010. Five days later, former USMNT player Manny Lagos was named as the club's first head coach.

The team played its first official game on April 11, 2010, a 2–0 loss to the Vancouver Whitecaps. The first goal in franchise history was scored by Daniel Wasson in their next game, a 1–0 victory over the Carolina RailHawks. The Stars enjoyed some impressive victories in their debut season, including a 3–1 win over Crystal Palace Baltimore, a 3–0 win over AC St. Louis, and a 3–1 win over FC Tampa Bay, eventually finishing fourth in their conference. Unfortunately for the Stars, they went out of the playoffs at the quarter-final stage, 4–0 on aggregate to the Carolina RailHawks, after defender Andres Arango was issued a red card after just 38 minutes. Simone Bracalello and Brian Cvilikas were the Stars' top scorers in 2010, with 5 goals each. The team averaged an attendance of 1,374 which was 10th out of the 12 league teams.

The Stars announced that for the 2011 season the team would no longer be owned by the National Sports Center but by the North American Soccer League. The United States Soccer Federation created ownership standards where the owner must have a net worth of at least US$20 million, and the National Sports Center did not meet that criterion. The NASL committed to owning the team for three years. The team set a budget of $2 million based on the goal of averaging 1,000 fans per game. By June 5 the team was in second place but a four-game losing streak as part of a 0–6–1 stretch sent the team in a slump before finishing with the sixth and final playoff spot. The Stars knocked off the Tampa Bay Rowdies 1–0 in the quarterfinals before defeating the first-seed Carolina RailHawks on penalty kicks after the two-legged series ended 4–4. A 3–1 home victory was enough to win the NASL championship after the second leg ended in a 0–0 draw. The team averaged around 1,700 fans during the season but drew 2,500 for the playoff semifinals and 4,511 for the final home leg.

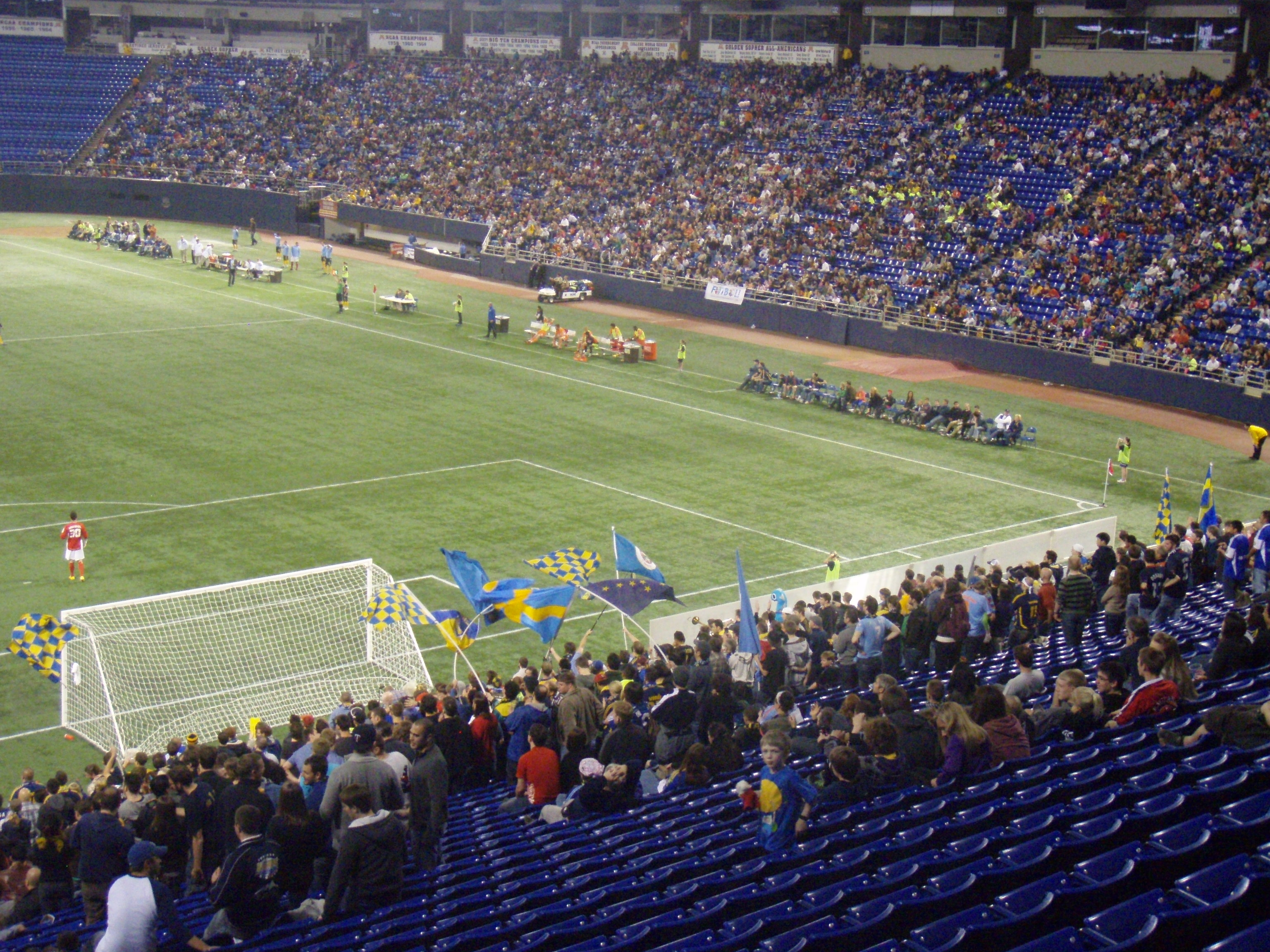
Minnesota Stars FC playing their opening game of the 2012 season at the Metrodome.

On January 9, 2012, the club announced a new logo as well as a new name. The NSC portion of the name, which had led to confusion, was dropped, with the new name being the Minnesota Stars FC. The new logo was revealed with the word 'NSC' removed and the state motto, L’Étoile du Nord, added. The team continued a search for a new owner in the offseason and opened the 2012 season with a 0–0 draw against the Carolina RailHawks at the Metrodome in front of a crowd of 8,693.

Minnesota faced an October 27, 2012, deadline to find new ownership to ensure a place in the NASL for the 2013 season. At the time the Minnesota Vikings expressed interest in professional soccer in Minnesota but were not contemplating purchasing the Stars. The league planned to vote on whether or not to fund the team for the 2013 season after the conclusion of the 2012 season. The USSF requirement that owners of a Division II team to be worth at least $20 million and a potential MLS bid by the Minnesota Vikings were seen as possible deterrents to finding a potential new owner. On November 9, 2012, the league officially announced that the team was purchased by Bill McGuire. On March 5, 2013, that was followed up by the team rebranding with the name Minnesota United FC. The $1.2 million budget that the Stars were operating on was expanded and the staff size increased to 20 employees for the start of the 2013 season, and has since more than doubled.

=== 2014 season ===
Minnesota United FC won the NASL Spring Season Championship. The team finished the season with 6 wins, 2 draws, and 1 loss coming to the New York Cosmos

On July 19, 2014, Minnesota United FC won 2–0 over Premier League side Swansea City in a friendly match played during the break between the NASL Spring and Fall seasons that drew 9,064 fans to the National Sports Center. Goals were scored by defender Justin Davis and midfielder Greg Jordan. However, Swansea did not field several of their top players, including Michel Vorm, Wilfried Bony, and Ki Sung-Yeung, all of whom played in the 2014 FIFA World Cup in Brazil.

=== 2015 season ===
After bringing in several promising new players during the off-season, including Cameroonian national team goalkeeper Sammy Ndjock, Minnesota United FC was a heavy favorite entering the year. However, the team struggled during the Spring Season due to chemistry problems both on and off the field and finishing in 4th place. The summer break saw the departure of break-out star player and member of the US Men's National Team Miguel Ibarra who bid farewell by playing one half for both Minnesota United and his new team Club León in an international friendly in front of 9,388 fans which ended in a 1–1 tie. After several additional roster moves, the Loons came out much stronger in the Fall Season, fighting for the Fall Season Championship and top playoff seed until the last week of the regular season but ultimately finishing in 3rd place.

Minnesota faced the Fall Season champions Ottawa Fury FC in the semifinal where they took an early lead after a goal by Christian Ramirez. but ultimately lost 2–1 against the Canadian side. Minnesota finished the 2015 combined season with a 14–11–5 record, tallying 54 goals along the way, the highest of any team in the league.

On December 3, 2015, it was announced that head coach Manny Lagos would move to being the team's full-time sporting director while assistant coach Carl Craig would take over the role as head coach for the 2016 season.

=== Move to Major League Soccer ===
On March 25, 2015, the league announced that it had awarded the 22nd MLS team in Minneapolis to a Bill McGuire-led ownership group that includes the owners of the Minnesota Twins, Timberwolves, and Wild. The team had hoped to build a soccer-specific stadium in Downtown Minneapolis near the Minneapolis Farmers Market but that plan was met with opposition from the mayor. The league selected United over a competing bid by the Minnesota Vikings ownership, who sought to use the under-construction U.S. Bank Stadium as its home field.

Following the announcement, team president Nick Rogers said he expected much of the team, including the name, logo, coach, and some players, to remain intact.

On October 23, 2015, the team and the City of Saint Paul announced that a soccer-specific stadium would be built in the Midway area of Saint Paul near the intersection of Snelling Avenue and University Avenue. The stadium, named Allianz Field, opened in April 2019, and seats approximately 19,400 fans.

The team made the switch to MLS in 2017, initially playing their home games at the University of Minnesota's TCF Bank Stadium.

== Colors and badge ==
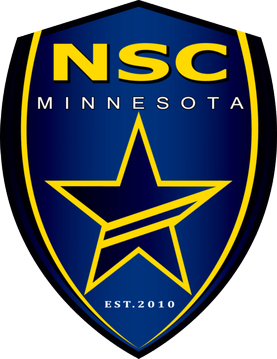
Original crest, as the NSC Minnesota (2010–11)

As the Stars, the team's official colors were blue and yellow, following the tradition established by the Minnesota Thunder of Minnesota soccer teams wearing predominantly blue as their home color. Before 2012, the club logo was a shield in two-tone blue and gold, with a stylized star overlaid by the NSC Minnesota wordmark. A new logo was unveiled in January 2012. The logo was designed over a six-month period by a member of the club's supporters group. The word 'NSC' removed and the state motto, L’Étoile du Nord, added along with a soccer ball behind the prominent star.

As Minnesota United, the new logo featured a stylized loon, which is the state bird of Minnesota, with eleven spread feathers, one for each of the players on the field. The rebranded team's colors were changed to sky blue, grey, and black, with a red accent. The blue line across the logo represents the Mississippi River. Either side of the blue represents the cities of Saint Paul and Minneapolis. The grey color represents the Iron Range of Minnesota. The upward pointing crest and the North Star were inspired by "L'Etoile du Nord" which is the state motto. Zeus Jones created the designs.

== Stadium ==
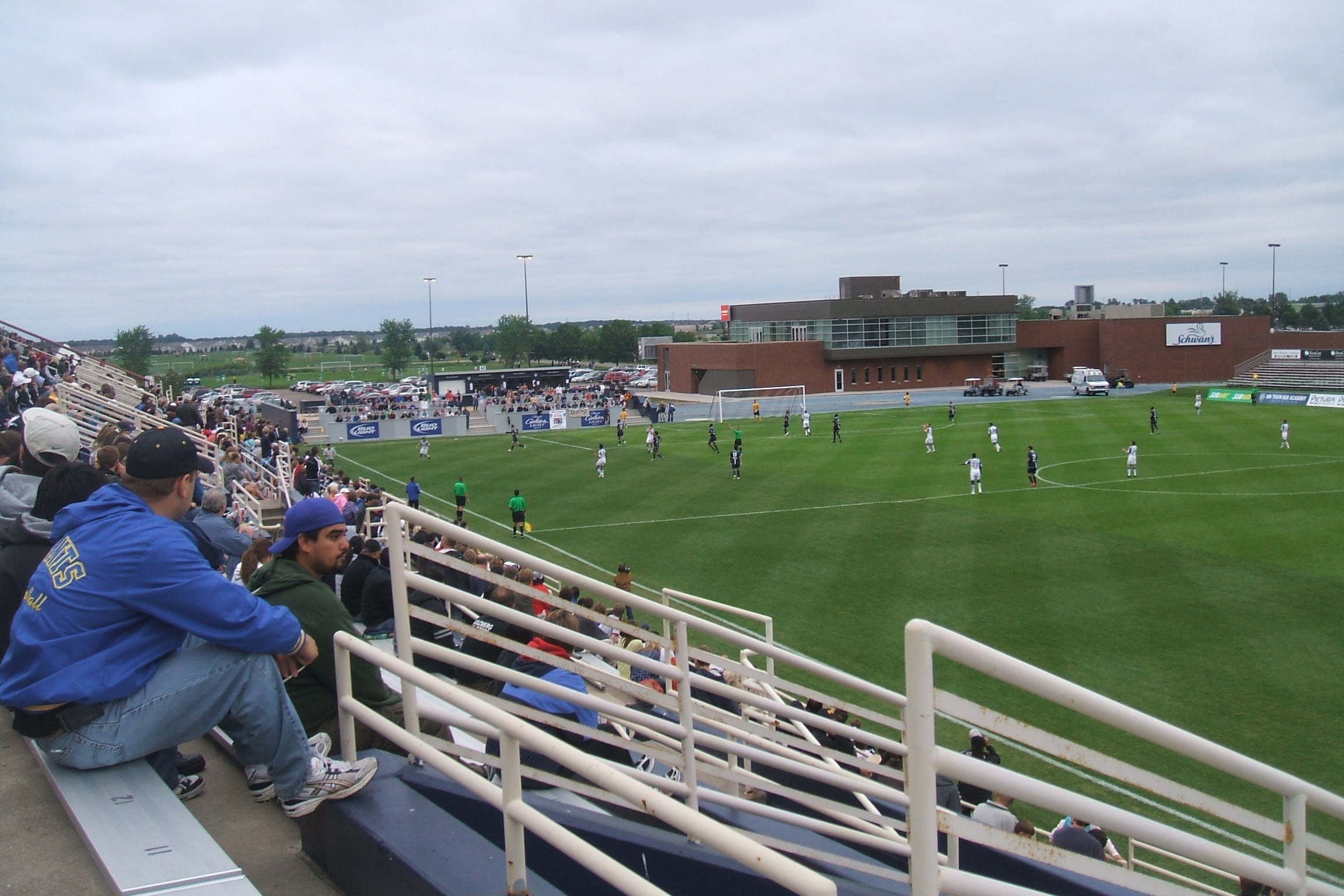
National Sports Center

- National Sports Center; Blaine. (Capacity: 8,500 to 10,000). (2010–2012, 2013 Spring Season Finale, Fall season, 2014 season besides August 2 Game)
- Hubert H. Humphrey Metrodome; Minneapolis. (Capacity: 60,000). (Season openers, 2013 Spring season besides July 4 Game)
- TCF Bank Stadium; Minneapolis. (Capacity 50,805). One game in 2014.

Before joining the MLS in 2017, United played its home games in the 8,500-seat stadium at the National Sports Center, a 600-acre (240 ha) multi-sport complex located in Blaine, Minnesota, which in addition to the soccer stadium, features over 50 full-sized soccer fields, a golf course, a velodrome, a meeting and convention facility, and an eight-sheet ice rink, the Schwan Super Rink.

The team played its home games for the 2013 Spring Season at the Hubert H. Humphrey Metrodome in downtown Minneapolis (now demolished). In the past, it has held its season openers there. In 2014 one game was played on a grass field at TCF Bank Stadium as part of a doubleheader with a Manchester City F.C. and Olympiacos F.C. friendly, which was part of the International Challenge Cup.

In 2015, significant temporary seating was added to the National Sports Center to accommodate large increases in attendance. Many matches saw new records set, with typical attendance exceeding 9,000.

The 2017 inaugural MLS season was played in the TCF Bank Stadium while the team awaited completion of a new soccer-specific stadium.

=== New stadium in Midway ===
A new soccer-specific stadium is planned to be built in the Midway area of Saint Paul. The $200 million stadium is privately funded and will seat 21,500.

The team had sought sites to build the stadium in Saint Paul, Minneapolis, and Bloomington. A preliminary plan in March 2015 proposed the stadium be built in downtown Minneapolis, near the Minneapolis Farmers Market. This proposal did not get enough political support from the city or the state.

The plans for the Midway site include a ring-shaped stadium, with 2.6 acres (1.1 ha) of outdoor gathering spaces. The site is accessible by transit, with both the METRO Green Line and the A Line serving near by. A city environmental assessment predicted in June 2016 that nearly a third of the attendees will arrive on the Green Line.

The stadium will sit on the site of a former bus maintenance facility that was used by Metro Transit. A masterplan has been drawn up for the redevelopment of the broad area, including the stadium site and adjacent properties owned by RK Midway. This may include building new hotel and office space and the redevelopment of the existing shopping center. The masterplan calls for the redevelopment to be more pedestrian friendly, to accommodate large numbers of fans walking to and from the transit stations.

A glass-like polymer mesh oval exterior with an overhang partially covering the field is expected to soften the noise towards the neighborhood. The stadium will be ringed by three grassy plazas and a fourth green space will be placed along University Avenue, near Snelling Avenue Station. These green spaces will be progressively introduced in phases as property owner RK Midway waits for existing leases on its current tenants to end. However, the timeline of these phases has not been released to the city or the public, as of July 2016.

The stadium was planned to break ground in June 2016, but has been delayed while the team awaits a tax-exemption from the state, similar to ones granted to other recent stadium projects. The first game in the new stadium was played April 13, 2019, against New York City FC.

== Club culture ==
=== Rivalries ===
During the course of the 2011 NASL season a rivalry was formed between the then-Stars and FC Edmonton known as the Flyover Cup. The name was chosen for Edmonton and Minnesota lying in flight paths for transcontinental flights, but often passed over by tourists. The symbol of the cup is a loon, being an unofficial national bird of Canada and also the state bird of Minnesota.

=== Supporters groups ===
The club has several recognized supporters groups: Dark Clouds, Wolf's Head, and True North Elite. The club also had several loosely organized unofficial supporters groups.

=== Mascot ===
Unveiled in July 2014, the club's mascot was a loon, PK, who wears the team jersey and soccer shoes. Fans also call the mascot Foot Foot.

=== Anthem ===
Fans sang the song "Wonderwall" by Oasis, after every home win, a tradition started in 2011, instigated by former manager Carl Craig.

== Records ==
=== Year-by-year ===
This is a complete list of seasons for the NASL franchise. For a season-by-season history including the successor Minnesota United FC MLS franchise, see List of Minnesota United FC seasons.

Season	League											Position		Playoffs	USOC	Continental	Average attendance	Top goalscorer(s)	
Season	Div	League	Pld	W	L	D	GF	GA	GD	Pts	PPG	Conf.	Overall	Playoffs	USOC	Continental	Average attendance	Name	Goals
2010	2	D2 Pro	30	11	12	7	32	36	–4	40	1.33	4th	7th	QF	R2	Ineligible	1,374	(Italy) Simone Bracalello	6
2011	2	NASL	28	9	10	9	30	32	–2	36	1.29	N/A	6th	W	DNE	Ineligible	1,676	(Italy) Simone Bracalello (United States) Neil Hlavaty	6
2012	2	NASL	28	8	9	11	34	33	+1	35	1.25	N/A	6th	RU	R3	DNQ	2,651	(Jamaica) Amani Walker	9
2013	2	NASL	26	10	12	4	39	42	–3	34	1.31	N/A	4th	DNQ	R2	DNQ	4,445	(Brazil) Pablo Campos	13
2014	2	NASL	27	16	4	7	47	28	+19	55	2.04	N/A	1st	SF	R4	DNQ	6,133	(United States) Christian Ramirez	21
2015	2	NASL	30	14	5	11	54	39	+15	53	1.77	N/A	3rd	SF	R3	DNQ	8,767	(United States) Christian Ramirez	13
2016	2	NASL	32	11	13	8	41	37	+4	41	1.28	N/A	5th	DNQ	R4	DNQ	8,573	(United States) Christian Ramirez	19
Total	–	–	201	79	65	57	277	247	+30	294	1.46	–	–	–	–	–	–	(United States) Christian Ramirez	53

1. Avg. attendance include statistics from league matches only.
2. Top goalscorer(s) includes all goals scored in League, League playoffs, U.S. Open Cup, CONCACAF Champions League, FIFA Club World Cup, and other competitive continental matches.
3. Overall Position combines the results of the spring and fall seasons of the North American Soccer League from the structure's implementation in 2013 through 2016, the club's last season in the league.

=== Managerial records ===
As of Match played October 29, 2016

Name	Nat.	From	To	P	W	D	L	GS	GA	%W	Honours	Notes
Manny Lagos	United States	February 10, 2010	December 3, 2015	190	78	58	54	264	232	41.05	NAST (1) – 2014, NASL Spring Champion (1) – 2014	
Carl Craig	England	December 3, 2015	October 30, 2016	34	12	8	14	44	39	35.29		

== Broadcasting ==
In 2013, as with all the teams in the NASL, United hosted webcasts of all its matches on NASL Live. Chris Lidholm handled the play by play along with Eric Nordquist as the sideline reporter. At the end of the 2013 season, two home games were broadcast live, one on Fox Sports North, the other on Channel 45.

For the 2014 season, all home games were broadcast on KSTC-TV Channel 45.

For the 2015 season, all home and away matches were broadcast on KSTC-45 as well as streamed online through ESPN3. U.S. Soccer Hall of Famer Alan Willey provided commentary and analysis during the broadcast of the matches.

In 2016, all matches were broadcast on WFTC Channel 29. Lidholm, Willey, and Nordquist continued as the broadcast team.

In 2018 Minnesota United and FOX Sports North announced a multi-year programming agreement to broadcast MNUFC matches on FOX Sports North.

== Reserve squad ==
In November 2013, the club became the second NASL team to announce that it would field a reserve squad in the National Premier Soccer League (Atlanta Silverbacks were the first). Minnesota United FC Reserves began play in the NPSL in 2014 at the Bielenberg Sports Complex and were coached by Donny Mark.

In their inaugural season, the Minnesota United FC Reserves lost to Lansing United in the first round of playoffs after a 6–2–2 regular season.

The Minnesota United FC Reserves moved to the Premier League of America to begin the 2016 season.
