= 2011 North American Soccer League season =

Sport competition

North American Soccer League
- Season: 2011
- Champions: NSC Minnesota Stars
- North American Supporters' Trophy: Carolina RailHawks
- Matches: 112
- Goals: 290 (2.59 per match)
- Top goalscorer: (Malta) Etienne Barbara (20)
- Biggest home win: EDM 4–0 TB; MTL 4–0 ATL
- Biggest away win: EDM 0–5 MTL
- Highest scoring: 7 goals: ATL 3–4 PUR
- Longest winning run: 10 matches: Carolina Railhawks
- Longest unbeaten run: 13 matches: Carolina Railhawks
- Longest winless run: 9 matches: Atlanta Silverbacks; Montreal Impact
- Longest losing run: 6 matches: Atlanta Silverbacks
- Highest attendance: 12,060; FC Tampa Bay @ Montreal Impact
- Lowest attendance: 797; Puerto Rico Islanders @ FC Edmonton
- Average attendance: 3,770

The 2011 North American Soccer League season is the 44th season of second division soccer in the United States and the inaugural season of the newly created North American Soccer League.

Earlier in 2011, the league's likelihood of earning second tier sanctioning had been thrown into question when the U.S. Soccer Federation rejected the league in January due to its financial instability. The USSF gave provisional sanctioning at the annual general meeting in Las Vegas on February 12, 2011.

== Competition format ==
The NASL debuted in 2011 with 8 teams playing a 28-game regular season schedule, with 14 home and 14 away games, playing each opponent four times. The NASL’s playoff format consisted of the top six teams, with the first two teams receiving a bye until the semifinal round and the remaining four teams playing in a single-game playoff to advance to the semifinals. The semifinals and the finals will each consist of a two-game home and home aggregate goal system.

== Regular season ==
=== Standings ===
Pos	Team	Pld	W	D	L	GF	GA	GD	Pts	Qualification
1	Carolina RailHawks (X)	28	17	3	8	50	26	+24	54	Playoff semifinals
2	Puerto Rico Islanders	28	15	7	6	41	32	+9	52	Playoff semifinals
3	Tampa Bay Rowdies	28	11	8	9	41	36	+5	41	Playoff quarterfinals
4	Fort Lauderdale Strikers	28	9	11	8	35	36	−1	38	Playoff quarterfinals
5	FC Edmonton	28	10	6	12	35	40	−5	36 (Note: EDM: 8 pts; MIN: 2 pts)	Playoff quarterfinals
6	NSC Minnesota Stars (C)	28	9	9	10	30	32	−2	36	Playoff quarterfinals
7	Montreal Impact	28	9	8	11	35	27	+8	35	
8	Atlanta Silverbacks	28	4	4	20	25	63	−38	16	

Source: NASL Standings
Rules for classification: 1) points; 2) head-to-head record; 3) goal difference; 4) number of goals scored.
(C) Champions; (X) Regular season champion

=== Results ===
Abbreviation and Color Key: Atlanta Silverbacks – ATL • Carolina RailHawks – CAR • FC Edmonton – EDM • Ft. Lauderdale Strikers – FTL NSC Minnesota Stars – MIN • Montreal Impact – MTL • Puerto Rico Islanders – PUR • FC Tampa Bay – TAM Win • Loss • Draw • Home
Club	Match																											
Club	1	2	3	4	5	6	7	8	9	10	11	12	13	14	15	16	17	18	19	20	21	22	23	24	25	26	27	28
Atlanta Silverbacks	MIN	EDM	FTL	TAM	EDM	MIN	FTL	CAR	MIN	MTL	TAM	PUR	CAR	PUR	FTL	MTL	TAM	CAR	TAM	PUR	MTL	EDM	CAR	PUR	EDM	MIN	FTL	MTL
Atlanta Silverbacks	1–2	0–1	1–2	1–1	0–2	0–3	0–0	0–2	0–2	2–1	2–3	1–3	1–5	3–4	3–2	2–2	2–1	0–1	0–4	0–2	0–4	0–3	2–4	2–0	1–2	0–2	1–1	0–4
Carolina RailHawks	PUR	MTL	EDM	MIN	TAM	FTL	MTL	PUR	ATL	TAM	EDM	TAM	ATL	MTL	MIN	EDM	EDM	ATL	FTL	PUR	MIN	FTL	ATL	TAM	FTL	MTL	PUR	MIN
Carolina RailHawks	1–2	2–1	2–0	1–1	3–1	4–2	2–1	3–0	2–0	2–1	1–0	3–1	5–1	2–0	0–1	1–1	4–1	1–0	1–2	0–2	1–1	2–0	4–2	2–0	0–1	0–1	0–1	1–2
FC Edmonton	FTL	ATL	CAR	MTL	ATL	TAM	MIN	TAM	MTL	CAR	PUR	MIN	MTL	MIN	CAR	TAM	CAR	TAM	FTL	PUR	FTL	ATL	PUR	PUR	MIN	ATL	FTL	MTL
FC Edmonton	2–1	1–0	0–2	0–5	2–0	1–1	2–1	4–0	0–2	0–1	3–0	1–1	1–0	1–1	1–1	1–2	1–4	1–3	0–3	0–1	1–1	3–0	2–3	1–1	3–1	2–1	1–2	0–2
Fort Lauderdale Strikers	EDM	MIN	ATL	PUR	MIN	CAR	ATL	MTL	PUR	MIN	MTL	PUR	TAM	TAM	ATL	MTL	PUR	EDM	CAR	MIN	EDM	CAR	TAM	MTL	CAR	EDM	ATL	TAM
Fort Lauderdale Strikers	1–2	1–1	2–1	2–2	1–1	2–4	0–0	0–0	3–2	3–0	0–0	1–1	1–1	2–4	2–3	1–1	1–3	3–0	2–1	1–0	1–1	0–2	0–2	1–0	1–0	2–1	1–1	0–2
NSC Minnesota Stars	ATL	FTL	PUR	CAR	FTL	ATL	PUR	EDM	TAM	PUR	ATL	FTL	EDM	EDM	CAR	PUR	MTL	MTL	FTL	TAM	CAR	MTL	MTL	EDM	TAM	ATL	TAM	CAR
NSC Minnesota Stars	2–1	1–1	1–3	1–1	1–1	3–0	2–0	1–2	0–0	1–1	2–0	0–3	1–1	1–1	1–0	0–1	1–0	3–1	0–1	0–2	1–1	0–2	0–2	1–3	1–2	2–0	1–1	2–1
Montreal Impact	TAM	CAR	TAM	EDM	CAR	TAM	FTL	EDM	ATL	PUR	FTL	EDM	PUR	CAR	FTL	ATL	MIN	PUR	MIN	TAM	ATL	MIN	MIN	FTL	PUR	CAR	EDM	ATL
Montreal Impact	0–1	1–2	0–0	5–0	1–2	0–3	0–0	0–2	1–2	1–2	0–0	1–0	0–0	0–2	1–1	2–2	0–1	1–0	1–3	3–3	4–0	2–0	2–0	0–1	1–1	1–0	2–0	4–0
Puerto Rico Islanders	CAR	TAM	MIN	FTL	MIN	CAR	MIN	FTL	MTL	EDM	ATL	FTL	MTL	ATL	TAM	MIN	FTL	MTL	EDM	ATL	CAR	TAM	EDM	EDM	ATL	MTL	CAR	TAM
Puerto Rico Islanders	2–1	2–0	3–1	2–2	0–2	0–3	1–1	2–3	2–1	0–3	3–1	1–1	0–0	4–3	1–1	1–0	3–1	0–1	1–0	2–0	2–0	2–1	3–2	1–1	0–2	1–1	1–0	1–0
FC Tampa Bay	MTL	PUR	MTL	ATL	CAR	EDM	MTL	MIN	EDM	CAR	ATL	CAR	FTL	FTL	PUR	EDM	ATL	EDM	ATL	MTL	MIN	PUR	FTL	CAR	MIN	MIN	PUR	FTL
FC Tampa Bay	1–0	0–2	0–0	1–1	1–3	1–1	3–0	0–0	0–4	1–2	3–2	1–3	1–1	4–2	1–1	2–1	1–2	3–1	4–0	3–3	2–0	1–2	2–0	0–2	2–1	1–1	0–1	2–0

Source: NASL results table

== Playoffs ==
The 6 qualifying teams will be given seeds 1 through 6 with the top team in the standings receiving the number 1 seed.

The format of the Playoffs will consist of a Quarterfinal Round, Semifinal Round and a Final Round. The Quarterfinal Round will be a single game while the Semifinal and Final Rounds will each be a 2-game series with each team playing at home once and the team with the greater number of aggregate goals in both games winning each series.

The number 1 seed and the number 2 seed will receive a bye directly to the Semifinal Round while the number 3 seed will host the number 6 seed and the number 4 seed will host the number 5 seed in the Quarterfinal Round.

For the Semifinal Round, the number 1 seed will be paired with the lowest seeded team to qualify from the Quarterfinal Round with the number 2 seed being paired with the highest seeded team to qualify from the Quarterfinal Round.

The winners of each series in the Semifinal Round will meet in the Final Round known as the Soccer Bowl. In the event of a draw in either Quarterfinal Round game, such game will progress to a 30-minute extra time period (the golden goal rule will not be in effect). If the teams are still locked in a draw following the extra time period, the winner will be determined by a penalty shootout.

In each Semifinal Round series and the Final Round series, if the teams are tied on the number of aggregate goals scored in the series at the conclusion of the second game, the teams will progress to a 30-minute extra time period. As in the Quarterfinal Round, the golden goal rule will not be in effect. If the teams are still locked in a draw following the extra time period, the winner of the series will be determined by a penalty shootout.

=== Bracket ===
Quarterfinals
3	FC Tampa Bay	0
6	NSC Minnesota Stars	1
4	Fort Lauderdale Strikers	5
5	FC Edmonton	0

Semifinals
1	Carolina RailHawks FC	0	4	4 (3)
6	NSC Minnesota Stars	1	3	4 (5)
2	Puerto Rico Islanders	1	1	2
4	Fort Lauderdale Strikers	3	2	5

Soccer Bowl 2011
6	NSC Minnesota Stars	3	0	3
4	Fort Lauderdale Strikers	1	0	1

=== Quarterfinals ===
October 1, 2011	FC Tampa Bay	0–1	NSC Minnesota Stars	St. Petersburg, Florida
7:30 pm EDT	Andres Arango (yellow card) 14'	Report	Luke Mulholland 27'; Jeff Cosgriff (yellow card) 50'; Kyle Altman (yellow card) 57'	Stadium: Al Lang Stadium; Attendance: 3,003

October 1, 2011	Fort Lauderdale Strikers	5–0	FC Edmonton	Fort Lauderdale, Florida
7:30 pm EDT	Brian Shriver 45' 54' (yellow card) 57'; Abe Thompson 46' 62' 77'	Report	Antonio Rago (yellow card) 36'; Paul Hamilton (yellow card) 58'; Shaun Saiko (yellow card) 68'	Stadium: Lockhart Stadium; Attendance: 2,250

=== Semifinals ===
October 8, 2011	NSC Minnesota Stars	1–0	Carolina RailHawks	Blaine, Minnesota
7:30 pm CDT	Brian Cvilikas (yellow card) 38'; Andrei Gotsmanov (yellow card) 56' (goal) 90'; Luke Mulholland (yellow card) 76'	Report	Devon McKenney (yellow card) 45'; Pablo Campos (yellow card) 67'; Tony McManus (yellow card) 76'	Stadium: National Sports Center; Attendance: 2,512

October 15, 2011	Carolina RailHawks	4–3 (a.e.t.) (3–5 p)	NSC Minnesota Stars	Cary, North Carolina
7:00 pm EDT	Pablo Campos 45+' 60' (pen.) 90+' (yellow card) 90+'; Jonny Steele (yellow card) 57'; Nick Zimmerman 63'; Devon McKenney (red card) 66'; Floyd Franks (yellow card) 85'; Chris Nurse (yellow card) 103'	Report	Brian Kallman (yellow card) 7'; Andrei Gotsmanov (yellow card) 10' (goal) 40'; Brian Cvilikas (yellow card) 36'; Kyle Altman (yellow card) 47'; Lucas Rodriguez 52'; Neil Hlavaty 67' (pen.); Justin Davis (yellow card) 120+'	Stadium: WakeMed Soccer Park; Attendance: 4,002
	Penalties
	Jonny Steele (penalty missed); Etienne Barbara (penalty scored); Kupono Low (penalty scored); Brad Knighton (penalty scored)		(penalty scored) Neil Hlavaty; (penalty scored) Devin Del Do; (penalty scored) Kyle Altman; (penalty scored) Simone Bracalello; (penalty scored) Lucas Rodriguez

Tied 4–4 on aggregate. NSC Minnesota Stars win 5–3 on penalties.

October 8, 2011	Puerto Rico Islanders	1–3	Fort Lauderdale Strikers	Bayamón, Puerto Rico
7:30 pm EDT	Jonathan Faña 84'	Report	Martin Nuñez 49'; Wálter Restrepo 82'; Brian Shriver 90+'	Stadium: Estadio Juan Ramon Loubriel

October 15, 2011	Fort Lauderdale Strikers	2–1	Puerto Rico Islanders	Fort Lauderdale, Florida
7:30 pm EDT	Brian Shriver 19' 59'	Report	David Foley 56'	Stadium: Lockhart Stadium; Attendance: 3,700

Fort Lauderdale Strikers win 5–2 on aggregate.

=== Soccer Bowl 2011 ===
October 22, 2011
6:30 pm CDT

NSC Minnesota Stars	3–1	Fort Lauderdale Strikers
Neil Hlavaty 4'; Luke Mulholland 53'; Lucas Rodriguez 77'	Report 1 Report 2	Justin Davis 52' (o.g.)

National Sports Center, Blaine, Minnesota
Attendance: 4,511
October 29, 2011
7:30 pm EDT

Fort Lauderdale Strikers	0–0	NSC Minnesota Stars
Gerson Mayen (yellow card) 90'	Report

Lockhart Stadium, Fort Lauderdale, Florida
Attendance: 6,849

NSC Minnesota Stars win Soccer Bowl 2011, 3–1 on aggregate.

== Attendance ==
Club	GP	Total	High	Low	Average
Montreal Impact	14	161,102	12,060	-	11,507
Fort Lauderdale Strikers	14	52,769	-	-	3,769
Carolina RailHawks	14	46,942	-	-	3,353
FC Tampa Bay	14	42,138	-	-	3,010
Atlanta Silverbacks	14	40,117	-	-	2,866
Puerto Rico Islanders	14	30,247	-	-	2,161
FC Edmonton	14	25,434	-	797	1,817
NSC Minnesota Stars	14	23,463	-	-	1,676
Total	112	422,212	12,060	797	3,770

- Updated to games played on September 24, 2011
Source: Kenn.com

== Statistical leaders ==
=== Top scorers ===
Rank	Player	Nation	Club	Goals
1	Etienne Barbara	MLT	Carolina RailHawks	20
2	Pablo Campos	BRA	Carolina RailHawks	11
2	Mike Ambersley	USA	FC Tampa Bay	11
2	Jonathan Faña	DOM	Puerto Rico Islanders	11
5	Shaun Saiko	CAN	FC Edmonton	9
5	Aaron King	USA	FC Tampa Bay	9
7	Matt Horth	USA	Atlanta Silverbacks	8
8	David Foley	ENG	Puerto Rico Islanders	7
8	Kyle Porter	CAN	FC Edmonton	7
8	Nicholas Addlery	JAM	Puerto Rico Islanders	7

=== Top goalkeepers ===
(Minimum of 1260 Minutes Played)

Rank	Goalkeeper	Club	MINS	SVS	GA	GAA
1	(United States) Evan Bush	Montreal Impact	1668	71	14	0.757
2	(United States) Brad Knighton	Carolina RailHawks	2480	115	26	0.942
3	(United States) Matt Glaeser	Fort Lauderdale Strikers	1905	75	22	1.038
4	(United States) Ray Burse	Puerto Rico Islanders	2340	98	28	1.077
5	(United States) Joe Warren	NSC Minnesota Stars	2430	105	30	1.111
6	(United States) Jeff Attinella	FC Tampa Bay	2060	128	31	1.354
7	(Netherlands) Rein Baart	FC Edmonton	2145	78	33	1.387
8	(United States) Jimmy Maurer	Atlanta Silverbacks	1531	93	41	2.412

== Awards ==
=== League awards ===
- Golden Ball (MVP): (Malta) Etienne Barbara (Carolina RailHawks)
- Golden Boot: (Malta) Etienne Barbara (Carolina RailHawks)
- Golden Glove: (United States) Evan Bush (Montreal Impact)
- Coach of the Year: (United States) Manny Lagos (NSC Minnesota Stars)
- Fair Play Award: FC Tampa Bay

NASL Best XI
Position	Players	Team
Goalkeeper	(United States) Brad Knighton	Carolina RailHawks
Defense	(France) Hassoun Camara	Montreal Impact
Defense	(Jamaica) Lance Laing	Fort Lauderdale Strikers
Defense	(United States) Kupono Low	Carolina RailHawks
Defense	(Finland) Toni Ståhl	Fort Lauderdale Strikers
Midfield	(England) David Foley	Puerto Rico Islanders
Midfield	(Haiti) Pascal Millien	FC Tampa Bay
Midfield	(Canada) Shaun Saiko	FC Edmonton
Midfield	(England) Matt Watson	Carolina RailHawks
Forward	(United States) Mike Ambersley	FC Tampa Bay
Forward	(Malta) Etienne Barbara	Carolina RailHawks
