= 2012 Fort Lauderdale Strikers season =

Fort Lauderdale Strikers
2012 season
- Owner: Traffic Sports USA
- Head coach: Daryl Shore
- NASL: Fifth
- NASL playoffs: First round
- U.S. Open Cup: Third round
- Top goalscorer: League: Mark Anderson (11 goals); All: Mark Anderson (13 goals)
- Highest home attendance: 5,629 (Sept. 1 v. Tampa Bay)
- Lowest home attendance: 2,404 (May 26 v. Atlanta Silverbacks)
- Average home league attendance: 3,615
Home colours	Away colours

The 2012 Fort Lauderdale Strikers season was the second season of the team in the North American Soccer League, and the entire club's thirty-eighth season in professional soccer. This year, the team finished fifth in the regular season and made it to the quarterfinals in the playoffs.

== Squad information ==
=== Roster ===
Note: Flags indicate national team as defined under FIFA eligibility rules; some limited exceptions apply. Players may hold more than one non-FIFA nationality.

No.	Pos.	Nation	Player
1	GK	USA	Dave Martin
2	MF	USA	Alfonso Motagalvan
3	DF	USA	Scott Lorenz
5	DF	FIN	Toni Ståhl
6	DF	USA	Nickardo Blake
7	MF	USA	Patrick Otte
8	MF	BRA	Pecka
9	FW	USA	Abe Thompson (Player/Assistant Coach)
10	MF	USA	Walter Restrepo
11	FW	MEX	Leopoldo Morales (on loan from Tigres)
12	DF	USA	Emilio Orozco (on loan from Tigres)
13	DF	USA	Jack Stewart
14	MF	LBR	Abel Gebor

No.	Pos.	Nation	Player
15	FW	USA	Aly Hassan
16	DF	JAM	Lance Laing
17	MF	USA	Conor Shanosky (on loan from D.C. United)
18	MF	GHA	Michael Tetteh (on loan from Seattle Sounders FC)
20	FW	ENG	Mark Anderson
21	FW	USA	Darnell King
22	GK	USA	Lionel Brown
23	MF	USA	Hosman Ramos
24	GK	USA	Matt Glaeser
25	MF	USA	Nicolas Clavijo
26	FW	CRC	Andy Herron
83	DF	USA	Scott Gordon

=== Squad breakdown ===
Updated May 16, 2012.

No.	Name	Nationality	Position	Date of birth (age)	Previous club
Goalkeepers
1	Cody Laurendi	(United States)	GK	August 15, 1988 (age 37)	Puerto Rico Islanders
24	Matt Glaeser	(United States)	GK	April 27, 1985 (age 40)	(Finland) Pallo-Iirot
Defenders
2	Stefan Antonijevic	(Serbia) \ (United States)	CB	January 24, 1989 (age 37)	(United States) Valparaiso Crusaders
3	Daniel Arcila	(Colombia)	LB	October 15, 1993 (age 32)	(Colombia) Deportivo Olimpico
5	Toni Ståhl	(Finland)	CB	May 11, 1985 (age 40)	(United States) Philadelphia Union
12	Iván Guerrero	(Honduras)	LB	November 30, 1977 (age 48)	(Honduras) C.D. Motagua
13	Justin Chavez	(United States)	CB	March 23, 1990 (age 35)	(United States) Tulsa Golden Hurricane
15	Scott Gordon	(United States)	RB	April 6, 1988 (age 37)	(United States) Chivas USA
18	Stéphane Guillaume	(Haiti)	RB	February 9, 1984 (age 42)	(United States) Cleveland City Stars
44	Shavar Thomas	(Jamaica) \ (United States)	CB	January 29, 1981 (age 45)	(Canada) Montreal Impact
Midfielders
6	Hosman Ramos	(El Salvador) \ (United States)	AM	August 26, 1989 (age 36)	(United States) Blue Star Honduras
8	Pecka	(Brazil)	DM	May 2, 1989 (age 36)	(Brazil) Flamengo
10	Walter Restrepo	(United States) \ (Colombia)	AM	June 21, 1988 (age 37)	(Colombia) Boyacá Chicó
14	Carlos Salazar	(Colombia)	AM	July 1, 1981 (age 44)	(Panama) Tauro FC
16	Mike Dietze	(United States)	DM	July 19, 1989 (age 36)	(United States) Seton Hall Pirates
17	Eduardo Jiménez	(Puerto Rico)	AM	December 18, 1990 (age 35)	(United States) UCF Knights
19	Gonzalo De Mujica	(Argentina) \ (United States)	AM	January 31, 1990 (age 36)	(United States) Orlando City U-23
20	Mark Anderson	(England)	AM	February 13, 1989 (age 37)	(United States) Barry University
23	Manny Gonzalez	(Colombia) \ (United States)	DM	June 3, 1990 (age 35)	(United States) FGCU Eagles
25	Rubens	(Brazil)	DM	October 12, 1989 (age 36)	(Brazil) Mato Grosso do Sul
Forwards
7	David Foley	(England)	W	December 5, 1987 (age 38)	Puerto Rico Islanders
11	Stefan Dimitrov	(Bulgaria) \ (United States)	ST	October 8, 1984 (age 41)	(United States) New York Cosmos
21	Darnell King	(United States)	W	September 23, 1990 (age 35)	(United States) Florida Atlantic University
26	Andy Herron	(Costa Rica)	ST	March 2, 1978 (age 48)	(Costa Rica) Limón

=== Transfers ===
==== In ====
No.	Pos.	Player	Previous club	Notes	Date	Source
26	FW	(Costa Rica) Andy Herron	(Costa Rica) Limón Fútbol Club	Free	January 25, 2012	
2	MF	(United States) Alfonso Motagalvan	(United States) Rochester Rhinos	Free	February 3, 2012	
3	DF	(United States) Scott Lorenz	(United States) Sporting Kansas City	Free	February 13, 2012	
19	FW	(United States) Halili Nagime	(New Zealand) Auckland City FC	Free	February 15, 2012	
17	MF	(United States) Conor Shanosky	(United States) D.C. United	Season-long loan	March 3, 2012	
13	DF	(United States) Jack Stewart	(United States) Minnesota Stars FC	Traded Martin Nuñez	March 6, 2012	
14	MF	(Liberia) Abel Gebor	(United States) Fort Lauderdale Schulz Academy	Open tryout	March 13, 2012	
1	GK	(United States) Dave Martin	(United States) Atlanta Silverbacks Reserves	Open tryout	March 16, 2012	
12	DF	(United States) Emilio Orozco	(Mexico) Tigres	Season-long loan	March 19, 2012	
20	FW	(England) Mark Anderson	(United States) Barry University	NASL Combine	March 21, 2012	
15	FW	(United States) Aly Hassan	(United States) Nova Southeastern University	Free	March 24, 2012	
21	FW	(United States) Darnell King	(United States) Florida Atlantic University	NASL Combine	March 27, 2012	
22	GK	(United States) Lionel Brown	(United States) University of Connecticut	Open tryout	March 27, 2012	
23	MF	(United States) Hosman Ramos	(United States) Blue Star Honduras	Successful trial	March 27, 2012	
6	DF	(United States) Nickardo Blake	(United States) University of Connecticut	Free	March 28, 2012	
25	MF	(United States) Nicolas Clavijo	(Uruguay) Atletico de Atenas	Free	April 5, 2012	
83	DF	(United States) Scott Gordon	(United States) Chivas USA	Free	July 12, 2012	
31	FW	(Brazil) Paulo Jr.	(United States) Real Salt Lake	Short-term loan	July 17, 2012	
18	MF	(Ghana) Michael Tetteh	(United States) Seattle Sounders FC	Short-term loan	August 24, 2012	

==== Out ====
No.	Pos.	Player	Transferred to	Fee/notes	Date	Source
20	MF	(El Salvador) Gerson Mayen	(United States) Chivas USA	Loan Return, subsequently traded to (Canada) Montreal Impact	November 23, 2011	
17	MF	(United States) Bryan Arguez	(Canada) Montreal Impact	Free	November 25, 2011	
27	DF	(United States) Martyn Lancaster	(United States) Atlanta Silverbacks	Free	December 2, 2011	
12	FW	(United States) Aaron Wheeler	(Finland) FC KooTeePee	Contract expired	December 14, 2011	
13	DF	(United States) Adam West	(Canada) FC Edmonton	Free	March 31, 2011	
14	MF	(Scotland) Grant Kerr	(Norway) FK Tønsberg	Contract expired	December 14, 2011	
22	DF	(United States) Aaron Hohlbein		Contract expired	December 14, 2011	
26	DF	(United States) Cristian Arrieta		Contract expired	December 14, 2011	
39	GK	(United States) Phillip Lamarre		Contract expired	December 14, 2011	
81	FW	(Haiti) Jean Philippe Peguero		Contract expired	December 14, 2011	
88	MF	(Argentina) Eduardo Coudet		Contract expired	December 14, 2011	
10	MF	(United States) Mike Palacio	(United States) Carolina RailHawks FC	Free	January 26, 2012	
	FW	(Brazil) Paulo Jr.	(United States) Real Salt Lake	Formerly on loan; option purchased	February 9, 2012	
21	FW	(United States) Brian Shriver	(United States) Carolina RailHawks FC	Cash and future considerations	February 17, 2012	
2	DF	(Colombia) Cristian Quiñones		Free	February 17, 2012	
11	FW	(United States) David Santamaria	(United States) Atlanta Silverbacks	Season-long loan	February 28, 2012	
1	GK	(United States) Nic Platter	(United States) Carolina RailHawks FC	Free	March 1, 2012	
23	FW	(Uruguay) Martin Nuñez	(United States) Minnesota Stars FC	Traded for Jack Stewart	March 6, 2012	
15	DF	(United States) Scott Gordon	(United States) Chivas USA	Undisclosed	March 18, 2012	
18	MF	(Colombia) Yoximar Granado		Released	July 12, 2012	
31	FW	(Brazil) Paulo Jr.	(United States) Real Salt Lake	Loan return	August 3, 2012	
19	FW	(United States) Halili Nagime		Released	August 15, 2012	
18	MF	(Ghana) Michael Tetteh	(United States) Seattle Sounders FC	Loan return	September 30, 2012	
17	MF	(United States) Conor Shanosky	(United States) D.C. United	Loan return	September 30, 2012	

== Competitions ==
=== Preseason ===
Win Loss Tie

February 25, 2012 1	FGCU Eagles	1–3	Fort Lauderdale Strikers	Fort Myers, Florida
7:00 PM EST	Unknown		Restrepo; Hassan; Unknown (own goal)	Stadium: FGCU Soccer Complex

March 4, 2012 2	Copa Latina All-Stars	2–2	Fort Lauderdale Strikers	Hialeah, Florida
4:00 PM EST	Unknown; Unknown		King 60'; Hassan 90'	Stadium: Ted Hendricks Stadium

March 7, 2012 3	Fort Lauderdale Strikers	2–0	Old Dominion Monarchs	Fort Lauderdale, Florida
1:00 PM EST	Laing; Herron			Stadium: Fort Lauderdale Stadium

March 14, 2012 4	Fort Lauderdale Strikers (United States)	2–1	Trinidad and Tobago U-23s	Fort Lauderdale, Florida
4:00 PM EDT	Herron 38' 88'		Unknown 51'	Stadium: Fort Lauderdale Stadium

March 18, 2012 5	Fort Lauderdale Strikers (United States)	1–0	Canada U-23s	Sunrise, Florida
3:00 PM EDT	King 86'			Stadium: Kics Sports Complex

March 21, 2012 6	Florida Atlantic Owls	1–1	Fort Lauderdale Strikers	Boca Raton, Florida
7:30 PM EDT	Dias 81'		Otte 26'	Stadium: FAU Soccer Stadium

March 24, 2012 7	Fort Lauderdale Strikers	7–2	Barry Buccaneers	Fort Lauderdale, Florida
10:00 AM EDT	Herron 18' 34' 65'; Morales 45'; Restrepo 57' 67'; Anderson 82'		Sealy 6'; Kim 29'	Stadium: Fort Lauderdale Stadium

March 26, 2012 8	Fort Lauderdale Strikers (United States)	5–1	(Bolivia) Bolívar U-19s	Fort Lauderdale, Florida
10:00 AM EDT	Hassan 57' 66'; Anderson 58'; Ramos 74'; Otte 85' (pen.)		Isita 27'	Stadium: Fort Lauderdale Stadium

March 31, 2012 9	Tampa Bay Rowdies	3–4	Fort Lauderdale Strikers	Auburndale, Florida
7:30 PM EDT	Yoshitake 11'; Ambersley 64' 84'		Herron 16'; Lorenz 27'; Hassan 46'; Anderson 72'	Stadium: FYSA Auburndale Complex

=== NASL regular season ===
==== Standings ====
Pos	Team	Pld	W	D	L	GF	GA	GD	Pts	Qualification
3	Puerto Rico Islanders	28	11	8	9	32	30	+2	41	Playoff quarterfinals
4	Carolina RailHawks	28	10	10	8	44	46	−2	40	Playoff quarterfinals
5	Fort Lauderdale Strikers	28	9	9	10	40	46	−6	36	Playoff quarterfinals
6	Minnesota United	28	8	11	9	34	33	+1	35	Playoff quarterfinals
7	Atlanta Silverbacks	28	7	9	12	35	46	−11	30	

Source: NASL Standings
Rules for classification: 1) points; 2) goal difference; 3) number of goals scored.

==== Results summary ====
Overall								Home						Away					
Pld	W	D	L	GF	GA	GD	Pts	W	D	L	GF	GA	GD	W	D	L	GF	GA	GD
28	9	9	10	40	46	−6	36	8	4	2	23	18	+5	1	5	8	17	28	−11

Last updated: September 26, 2012.

==== Results by round ====
Round	1	2	3	4	5	6	7	8	9	10	11	12	13	14	15	16	17	18	19	20	21	22	23	24	25	26	27	28
Stadium	H	H	A	H	A	A	A	H	H	H	A	H	A	H	A	A	H	A	A	H	A	H	A	H	H	H	A	A
Result	W	T	T	W	L	T	L	L	T	W	L	W	L	W	L	T	T	W	L	W	L	W	T	W	L	T	L	T
Position	1	2	3	2	3	3	4	5	5	4	4	4	6	5	6	6	6	5	6	4	5	4	4	4	5	4	5	5

Updated to match(es) played on September 26, 2012. Source:
A = Away; H = Home; W = Win; L = Loss; T = Tie

==== Match results ====
Win Loss Tie

April 7, 2012 1	Fort Lauderdale Strikers	1–0	FC Edmonton	Fort Lauderdale, Florida
7:30 PM EDT	Hassan (red card) 40'; Herron 61'		Lassonde (yellow card) 19'; Kooy (yellow card) 26' van Leerdam (yellow card) 90'	Stadium: Lockhart Stadium; Attendance: 4,779; Referee: Ted Unkel

April 14, 2012 2	Fort Lauderdale Strikers	0–0	Minnesota Stars FC	Fort Lauderdale, Florida
7:30 PM EDT	Lorenz (yellow card) 83'		Takada (yellow card) 52'; Friedland (yellow card) 72'; Del Do (yellow card) 78'	Stadium: Lockhart Stadium; Attendance: 2,916

April 21, 2012 3	San Antonio Scorpions FC	2–2	Fort Lauderdale Strikers	San Antonio, Texas
8:30 PM EDT	Pitchkolan (yellow card) 16'; Harmse (yellow card) 22'; Campos 41'; Denissen 90'; Knight (red card) 90'; Luiz Tiago (red card) 90'		Shanosky (yellow card) 10'; Herron 32' 51'; Morales (yellow card) 53'; Ståhl (yellow card) 90' (red card) 90'; Thompson (red card) 90'	Stadium: Heroes Stadium; Attendance: 10,114

April 25, 2012 4	Fort Lauderdale Strikers	3–2	Puerto Rico Islanders	Fort Lauderdale, Florida
7:30 PM EDT	Hassan 36' 47' 84'; Laing (yellow card) 60'		Cunningham (yellow card) 38'; Addlery (yellow card) 41'; Needham 50'; Foley 62'; Van Schaik (yellow card) 66'; Needham (yellow card) 90'	Stadium: Lockhart Stadium; Attendance: 2,754

April 28, 2012 5	Tampa Bay Rowdies	3–1	Fort Lauderdale Strikers	St. Petersburg, Florida
7:30 PM EDT	Clare 27'; Ambersley 62' (pen.); Rodrigues (yellow card) 63'; Savage 90'		Ståhl (yellow card) 42'; Restrepo 90'	Stadium: Al Lang Field; Attendance: 3,536

May 2, 2012 6	Carolina RailHawks FC	3–3	Fort Lauderdale Strikers	Cary, North Carolina
7:00 PM EDT	Shriver 41'; Shriver (yellow card) 42'; Zimmerman 47' 67'; Schilawski (yellow card) 55'		Ståhl (yellow card) 56'; Laing 61'; Restrepo 67'; Anderson 77'; Restrepo (yellow card) 78'	Stadium: WakeMed Soccer Park; Attendance: 2,718

May 12, 2012 7	Puerto Rico Islanders	2–0	Fort Lauderdale Strikers	Bayamón, Puerto Rico
7:30 PM EDT	Martin (yellow card) 30'; Foley 45'; Ramos 51'; Hanson (yellow card) 89'		Restrepo (yellow card) 20'; Lorenz (yellow card) 70'; Granado (yellow card) 82'	Stadium: Bayamón Soccer Complex

May 19, 2012 8	Fort Lauderdale Strikers	1–3	Minnesota Stars FC	Fort Lauderdale, Florida
7:30 PM EDT	Anderson 36'; Restrepo (yellow card) 57'		Walker 45'; Ibarra 62'; Kallman (yellow card) 72'; Bracalello 83'; Hlavaty (yellow card) 90'	Stadium: Lockhart Stadium; Attendance: 2,720

May 26, 2012 9	Fort Lauderdale Strikers	1–1	Atlanta Silverbacks	Fort Lauderdale, Florida
7:30 PM EDT	Anderson (yellow card) 27'; Blake (yellow card) 35'; Anderson 49'; Gebor (yellow card) 59'; Ståhl (red card) 73'; Glaeser (yellow card) 74'; Restrepo (yellow card) 88'		González (yellow card) 45'; Paulini (yellow card) 47'; Navia 69'; O'Brien (yellow card) 89'	Stadium: Lockhart Stadium; Attendance: 2,404; Referee: Hayden Edwards

June 2, 2012 10	Fort Lauderdale Strikers	3–1	Tampa Bay Rowdies	Fort Lauderdale, Florida
7:30 PM EDT	Thompson 52' (pen.); Anderson 54'; Restrepo 90'; Stewart (yellow card) 87'; Orozco (yellow card) 88'		Mulholland 33'; Ambersley (yellow card) 62'	Stadium: Lockhart Stadium; Attendance: 3,255

June 10, 2012 11	FC Edmonton	1–0	Fort Lauderdale Strikers	Edmonton, Alberta, Canada
4:05 PM EDT	Rago (red card) 33'; Lam (yellow card) 63'; Cox 66'; Caceros (yellow card) 80'; Parker (yellow card) 85'; Saiko (yellow card) 88'		Thompson (penalty missed); Motagalvan (yellow card) 55'	Stadium: Clarke Stadium; Attendance: 1,496

June 16, 2012 12	Fort Lauderdale Strikers	1–0	FC Edmonton	Fort Lauderdale, Florida
7:30 PM EDT	Herron 68'; Shanosky (yellow card) 84'		Saiko (yellow card) 49' van Leerdam (yellow card) 64'; Lam (yellow card) 82'	Stadium: Lockhart Stadium

June 23, 2012 13	Minnesota Stars FC	2–1	Fort Lauderdale Strikers	Blaine, Minnesota
8:30 PM EDT	Hlavaty 17' (pen.); Tobin (yellow card) 25'; Bracalello 39'; Nuñez (yellow card) 69'		Otte (yellow card) 6'; Herron (yellow card) 15'; Ståhl (yellow card) 17'; Anderson 26'; Lorenz (yellow card) 83'	Stadium: NSC Stadium

June 30, 2012 14	Fort Lauderdale Strikers	2–1	Carolina RailHawks FC	Fort Lauderdale, Florida
7:30 PM EDT	Anderson 5' 45'; Pecka (yellow card) 41'; Ramos (yellow card) 67'		Nurse (yellow card) 61'; Zimmerman 83'	Stadium: Lockhart Stadium; Attendance: 3,586; Referee: Kevin Morrison

July 4, 2012 15	Tampa Bay Rowdies	3–1	Fort Lauderdale Strikers	St. Petersburg, Florida
6:30 PM EDT	Herron 19'; Orozco (yellow card) 26' (red card) 79'; Herron (yellow card) 67'		Ambersley 30'; Yoshitake 67'; Antoniuk 85'; Rodrigues (yellow card) 87' (red card) 90'	Stadium: Al Lang Field; Attendance: 4,710; Referee: Ismail Elfath

July 7, 2012 16	Carolina RailHawks FC	3–3	Fort Lauderdale Strikers	Cary, North Carolina
7:00 PM EDT	Palacio 13' 87'; Shipalane 90+4'		King 31'; Restrepo 33' 69'; Ståhl (yellow card) 40'	Stadium: WakeMed Soccer Park; Attendance: 2,713; Referee: Kevin Terry

July 14, 2012 17	Fort Lauderdale Strikers	2–2	San Antonio Scorpions FC	Fort Lauderdale, Florida
7:30 PM EDT	Lorenz (yellow card) 17'; Herron 28' 90'; Motagalvan (red card) 72'; King (yellow card) 62'; Restrepo (yellow card) 69'		Greenfield (yellow card) 26'; Campos 58' 90+'; Cochrane (red card) 64'; Pitchkolan (yellow card) 90'	Stadium: Lockhart Stadium; Attendance: 5,223; Referee: Mark Kadlecik

July 18, 2012 18	Minnesota Stars FC	1–2	Fort Lauderdale Strikers	Blaine, Minnesota
8:30 PM EDT	Bracalello (yellow card) 38' (goal) 64'; Nuñez (yellow card) 70'		Stewart (yellow card) 29'; Anderson 34' 42'; King (yellow card) 40'; Herron (yellow card) 62'	Stadium: NSC Stadium; Attendance: 4,034

July 21, 2012 19	San Antonio Scorpions FC	1–0	Fort Lauderdale Strikers	San Antonio, Texas
8:30 PM EDT	Janicki (yellow card) 10'; Harmse (red card) 70'; Campos (yellow card) 49' (goal) 57'		Herron (red card) 35'; Shanosky (yellow card) 45'; Motagalvan (yellow card) 70'; Stewart (yellow card) 87'	Stadium: Heroes Stadium; Attendance: 10,584; Referee: Ramón Hernández

July 28, 2012 20	Fort Lauderdale Strikers	5–3	Atlanta Silverbacks	Fort Lauderdale, Florida
7:30 PM EDT	Paulo Jr. 5'; Pecka (yellow card) 8'; Anderson 28'; Stewart (yellow card) 30'; Hassan 54' 67' (yellow card) 63'; Shanosky (yellow card) 55'; Motagalvan (yellow card) 85'; Restrepo 90'		Barrera (yellow card) 22'; Pedro Mendes 30'; Horth 41'; Blanco (yellow card) 57'; Paulo Mendes 76'	Stadium: Lockhart Stadium; Attendance: 3,160; Referee: Jonathan Weiner

August 4, 2012 21	Atlanta Silverbacks	4–2	Fort Lauderdale Strikers	Atlanta
7:30 PM EDT	Pedro Mendes 8' 78' (yellow card) 80'; Horth 29'; Carr 64'; Colaluca (yellow card) 74'		Gordon 27'; Anderson 54'; Orozco (yellow card) 66'	Stadium: Atlanta Silverbacks Park; Attendance: 4,090; Referee: Hayden Edwards

August 11, 2012 22	Fort Lauderdale Strikers	1–0	Carolina RailHawks FC	Fort Lauderdale, Florida
7:30 PM EDT	Herron 64'		Shipalane (yellow card) 85'	Stadium: Lockhart Stadium; Attendance: 3,549; Referee: Kevin Terry Jr.

August 18, 2012 23	Puerto Rico Islanders	0–0	Fort Lauderdale Strikers	Bayamón, Puerto Rico
7:30 PM EDT	Blake (yellow card) 22'; Motagalvan (yellow card) 45'		Telesford (yellow card) 39'; Nurse (yellow card) 71'	Stadium: Estadio Juan Ramón Loubriel; Attendance: 7,192; Referee: Marcos DeOlivera

August 25, 2012 24	Fort Lauderdale Strikers	2–1	San Antonio Scorpions FC	Fort Lauderdale, Florida
7:30 PM EDT	Anderson (yellow card) 25'; Ramos (yellow card) 52'; Thompson 59' (pen.) 69'; Gordon (yellow card) 82'		Ramirez (yellow card) 45'; Janicki (yellow card) 64'; Saavedra 83'	Stadium: Lockhart Stadium; Attendance: 3,268; Referee: Javier Santos

September 1, 2012 25	Fort Lauderdale Strikers	0–3	Tampa Bay Rowdies	Fort Lauderdale, Florida
7:30 PM EDT	Laing (yellow card) 2'; Tetteh (red card) 19'; Ståhl (yellow card) 53'		Arango (yellow card) 21'; Picault (yellow card) 53'; Sanfilippo (yellow card) 59' (goal) 82'; Cox 81'; Scott (yellow card) 88'; Cort 90+'	Stadium: Lockhart Stadium; Attendance: 5,629; Referee: Jesus Cisneros

September 8, 2012 26	Fort Lauderdale Strikers	1–1	Puerto Rico Islanders	Fort Lauderdale, Florida
7:30 PM EDT	Pecka 9'; Blake (yellow card) 57'; Laing (yellow card) 73'		Addlery 3'; Barreiro (yellow card) 43'; Pantazopoulos (yellow card) 52'	Stadium: Lockhart Stadium; Attendance: 4,704; Referee: Elle Agullar

September 15, 2012 27	Atlanta Silverbacks	1–0	Fort Lauderdale Strikers	Atlanta
7:30 PM EDT	Horth 11'; Paulini (yellow card) 43'; Colaluca (yellow card) 73'; Pedro Mendes (yellow card) 82'		King (yellow card) 26'; Motagalvan (yellow card) 75' (red card) 75'; Hassan (yellow card) 86'; Herron (yellow card) 90'	Stadium: Atlanta Silverbacks Park; Attendance: 5,511; Referee: Younes Marrakchi

September 23, 2012 28	FC Edmonton	2–2	Fort Lauderdale Strikers	Edmonton, Alberta, Canada
4:05 PM EDT	Gigolaj 90'; Craig 90+'		Thompson 11' (pen.); Hassan (yellow card) 62' (goal) 78'; Tetteh (yellow card) 64'	Stadium: Clarke Stadium; Attendance: 1,392; Referee: David Gantar

=== U.S. Open Cup ===
May 22, 2012 2nd Rd.	Fort Lauderdale Strikers (Florida)	7–2	(California) Fresno Fuego	Fort Lauderdale, Florida
7:30 PM EDT	Stewart (yellow card) 21'; Hassan 42' 57' 69'; Pecka (yellow card) 45'; Anderson 61'; Restrepo 78'; Morales 89' 90'		Campos (yellow card) 45'; Finch 54'; Grewal (yellow card) 56'; Gonzalez (yellow card) 60'; Reinhart 86'	Stadium: Lockhart Stadium

May 29, 2012 3rd Rd.	San Jose Earthquakes (California)	2–1	(Florida) Fort Lauderdale Strikers	Stanford, California
7:30 PM PDT	Morrow (yellow card) 50'; Garza 63' 70'; Garza (yellow card) 66'		Anderson 38'; Lorenz (yellow card) 55'; Restrepo (yellow card) 88'	Stadium: Cagan Stadium; Attendance: 1,271; Referee: Yader Reyes

=== NASL Playoffs ===
September 29, 2012 1st Rd.	Carolina RailHawks	3–1	Fort Lauderdale Strikers	Cary, North Carolina
7:00 PM PDT	Lowery 34' (yellow card) 71'; Shipalane 52' 67'; Franks (yellow card) 86'		Shanosky (yellow card) 58'; Thompson 61'; Laing (yellow card) 90'	Stadium: WakeMed Soccer Park; Attendance: 2,534; Referee: Daniel Radford

== International call-ups ==
No.	P	Name	Country	Level	Caps	Goals	Opposition	Competition	Source
16	DF	Lance Laing	Jamaica	Senior	4	0	vs. Guyana(May 18) ✗ vs. Panama(May 27) ✗ vs. Panama(June 1) ✗	Friendly	

== Squad statistics ==
=== NASL league matches ===
==== Players ====
Nat	No	Player	Pos	Apps	Starts	G	A	Booked	Sent off (straight red)	Notes
(United States)	2	Alfonso Motagalvan	DM	16	12	0	1	5	2	
(United States)	3	Scott Lorenz	LB	22	17	0	4	4	0	
(Finland)	5	Toni Ståhl	CB	21	21	0	0	6	2	
(United States)	6	Nickardo Blake	RB	20	15	0	0	3	0	
(United States)	7	Patrick Otte	RW	8	3	0	0	1	0	
(Brazil)	8	Pecka	DM	24	19	1	0	2	0	
(United States)	9	Abe Thompson	ST	18	10	4	5	1	1	
(United States)	10	Wálter Restrepo	AM	21	20	6	8	4	0	Sent to blood bin
(Mexico)	11	Leopoldo Moráles	FW	11	10	0	0	2	0	Sent to blood bin
(United States)	12	Emilio Orozco	CB	14	9	0	0	2	1	
(United States)	13	Jack Stewart	CB	20	19	0	0	4	0	
(Liberia)	14	Abel Gebor	DM	6	4	0	0	1	0	
(United States)	15	Aly Hassan	ST	20	14	6	1	3	1	
(Jamaica)	16	Lance Laing	LB	16	14	1	2	3	0	
(United States)	17	Conor Shanosky	DM	27	26	0	0	4	0	
(Ghana)	18	Michael Tetteh	LM	3	2	0	0	1	1	
(Colombia)	18	Yoximar Granado	RB	1	1	0	0	1	0	
(United States)	19	Halili Nagime	FW	2	0	0	0	0	0	
(England)	20	Mark Anderson	AM	25	19	11	4	1	0	
(United States)	21	Darnell King	RW	22	10	1	2	3	0	
(United States)	23	Hosman Ramos	AM	12	7	0	0	2	0	
(United States)	25	Nicolas Clavijo	LM	1	0	0	0	0	0	
(Costa Rica)	26	Andy Herron	ST	18	16	8	2	4	1	
(Brazil)	31	Paulo Jr.	ST	3	3	1	1	0	0	
(United States)	83	Scott Gordon	CB	11	11	1	1	1	0	
						40	31	59	9	

Last updated: September 26, 2012.

==== Goalkeepers ====
Nat	No	Player	Apps	Starts	Record	GA	GAA	SO
(United States)	1	Dave Martin	1	1	0-1-0	2	2.00	0
(United States)	22	Lionel Brown	0	0	0-0-0	0	0	0
(United States)	24	Matt Glaeser	27	27	9-8-10	44	1.63	5
			28	28	9-9-10	46	1.64	5

Last updated: September 26, 2012.

=== U.S. Open Cup ===
==== Players ====
Nat	No	Player	Pos	Apps	Starts	G	A	Booked	Sent off (straight red)	Notes
(United States)	2	Alfonso Motagalvan	DM	2	1	0	0	0	0	
(United States)	3	Scott Lorenz	LB	2	2	0	1	1	0	
(Finland)	5	Toni Ståhl	CB	1	1	0	0	0	0	
(United States)	6	Nickardo Blake	RB	2	2	0	0	0	0	
(United States)	7	Patrick Otte	RW	0	0	0	0	0	0	
(Brazil)	8	Pecka	DM	2	2	0	0	1	0	
(United States)	9	Abe Thompson	ST	1	1	0	0	0	0	
(United States)	10	Wálter Restrepo	AM	2	1	1	1	1	0	
(Mexico)	11	Leopoldo Moráles	FW	2	2	2	0	0	0	
(United States)	12	Emilio Orozco	CB	0	0	0	0	0	0	
(United States)	13	Jack Stewart	CB	2	2	0	0	1	0	
(Liberia)	14	Abel Gebor	DM	2	1	0	0	0	0	
(United States)	15	Aly Hassan	ST	1	1	3	0	0	0	
(Jamaica)	16	Lance Laing	LB	0	0	0	0	0	0	
(United States)	17	Conor Shanosky	DM	2	1	0	0	0	0	
(Colombia)	18	Yoximar Granado	RB	0	0	0	0	0	0	
(United States)	19	Halili Nagime	FW	0	0	0	0	0	0	
(England)	20	Mark Anderson	ST	2	2	2	0	0	0	
(United States)	21	Darnell King	ST	1	1	0	0	0	0	
(United States)	23	Hosman Ramos	AM	0	0	0	0	0	0	
(United States)	25	Nicolas Clavijo	LM	0	0	0	0	0	0	
(Costa Rica)	26	Andy Herron	ST	1	0	0	0	0	0	
						8	2	4	0	

Last updated: May 30, 2012.

==== Goalkeepers ====
Nat	No	Player	Apps	Starts	Record	GA	GAA	SO
(United States)	1	Dave Martin	1	1	1-0-0	2	2.00	0
(United States)	22	Lionel Brown	0	0	0-0-0	0	0	0
(United States)	24	Matt Glaeser	1	1	0-0-1	2	2.00	0
			2	2	1-0-1	4	2.00	0

Last updated: May 30, 2012.

=== NASL Playoffs ===
==== Players ====
Nat	No	Player	Pos	Apps	Starts	G	A	Booked	Sent off (straight red)	Notes
(United States)	2	Alfonso Motagalvan	DM	0	0	0	0	0	0	
(United States)	3	Scott Lorenz	LB	0	0	0	0	0	0	
(Finland)	5	Toni Ståhl	CB	1	1	0	0	0	0	
(United States)	6	Nickardo Blake	RB	1	1	0	0	0	0	
(United States)	7	Patrick Otte	RW	0	0	0	0	0	0	
(Brazil)	8	Pecka	DM	1	1	0	0	0	0	
(United States)	9	Abe Thompson	ST	1	0	1	0	0	0	
(United States)	10	Wálter Restrepo	AM	0	0	0	0	0	0	Sent to blood bin
(Mexico)	11	Leopoldo Moráles	FW	0	0	0	0	0	0	Sent to blood bin
(United States)	12	Emilio Orozco	CB	0	0	0	0	0	0	
(United States)	13	Jack Stewart	CB	0	0	0	0	0	0	
(Liberia)	14	Abel Gebor	DM	0	0	0	0	0	0	
(United States)	15	Aly Hassan	ST	1	0	0	0	0	0	
(Jamaica)	16	Lance Laing	LB	1	1	0	1	1	0	
(United States)	17	Conor Shanosky	DM	1	1	0	0	1	0	
(Ghana)	18	Michael Tetteh	LM	1	1	0	0	0	0	
(England)	20	Mark Anderson	AM	1	1	0	0	0	0	
(United States)	21	Darnell King	RW	1	0	0	0	0	0	
(United States)	23	Hosman Ramos	AM	1	1	0	0	0	0	
(United States)	25	Nicolas Clavijo	LM	0	0	0	0	0	0	
(Costa Rica)	26	Andy Herron	ST	1	1	0	0	0	0	
(United States)	83	Scott Gordon	CB	1	1	0	0	0	0	
						1	1	2	0	

Last updated: November 26, 2012.

==== Goalkeepers ====
Nat	No	Player	Apps	Starts	Record	GA	GAA	SO
(United States)	1	Dave Martin	0	0	0-0-0	0	0.00	0
(United States)	22	Lionel Brown	0	0	0-0-0	0	0	0
(United States)	24	Matt Glaeser	1	1	0-0-1	3	3.00	0
			1	1	0-0-1	3	3.00	0

Last updated: November 26, 2012.

=== Top scorers ===
Includes all competitive matches. The list is sorted by shirt number when total goals are equal.

Ran	No.	Pos	Nat	Name	NASL	U.S. Open Cup	Playoffs	Total
1	20	MF	(England)	Mark Anderson	11	2	0	13
2	15	FW	(United States)	Aly Hassan	6	3	0	9
3	26	FW	(Costa Rica)	Andy Herron	8	0	0	8
4	10	MF	(United States)	Walter Restrepo	6	1	0	7
5	9	FW	(United States)	Abe Thompson	4	0	1	5
6	11	FW	(Mexico)	Polo Morales	0	2	0	2
7	8	MF	(Brazil)	Pecka	1	0	0	1
7	16	DF	(Jamaica)	Lance Laing	1	0	0	1
7	21	FW	(United States)	Darnell King	1	0	0	1
7	31	FW	(Brazil)	Paulo Jr.	1	0	0	1
7	83	DF	(United States)	Scott Gordon	1	0	0	1
				TOTALS	40	8	1	49

Last updated: November 26, 2012

== Club staff ==
Position	Name
President	(United States) Tim Robbie
Head coach	(United States) Daryl Shore
Assistant coach & Goalkeeper Coach	(Brazil) Ricardo Lopes
Player/Assistant Coach	(United States) Abe Thompson
Head Athletic Trainer	(United States) Joe Caroccio
Director of Operations	(United States) Miguel Lopez

Updated to match played June 22, 2012

== Recognition ==
=== NASL Player of the Week ===
Week	Player	Category
1	(Costa Rica) Andy Herron (FW)	Offensive
3	(Costa Rica) Andy Herron (FW)	Offensive
11	(United States) Jack Stewart (DF)	Defensive
13	(England) Mark Anderson (MF)	Offensive
16	(England) Mark Anderson (MF)	Offensive
19	(Costa Rica) Andy Herron (FW)	Offensive
20	(United States) Conor Shanosky (MF)	Defensive
21	(United States) Abe Thompson (FW)	Offensive

=== NASL Best XI ===
- (England) Mark Anderson
- (United States) Walter Restrepo
