= 2011 Fort Lauderdale Strikers season =

Fort Lauderdale Strikers
2011 season
- Owner: Aaron Davidson; Traffic Sports USA
- Coach: Daryl Shore
- NASL: Fourth
- NASL playoffs: Runner-up
- U.S. Open Cup: did not enter
- Top goalscorer: Brian Shriver (11 goals)
- Highest home attendance: 6,849 (Oct 29 v. Minnesota)
- Lowest home attendance: 2,159 (Sep 7 v. Carolina)
- Average home league attendance: 3,985
Home colours	Away colours

The 2011 Fort Lauderdale Strikers season was the first season of the new team in the new North American Soccer League. Previously, the Miami FC had fielded a team that played for four seasons in the USL First Division and another for one season in the USSF Division 2 Professional League. After joining the new NASL, the club connected with the original Fort Lauderdale Striker's club. After 14 years, since 1997, the name and legacy was brought back and now placed together with Miami FC, uniting the clubs under the Striker's name. This marked the entire club's thirty-seventh season in professional soccer. In the inaugural year of the league, the club fielded the new team and finished fourth in the regular season. They made the playoffs and continued into the NASL Championship Series. They were this year's Runners-up.

== Club ==
=== Coaching staff ===
Position	Staff
Head Coach	(United States) Daryl Shore
Assistant Coach	(United States) Jim Rooney
Goalkeeper Coach	(Brazil) Ricardo Lopez
Head Athletic Trainer	(United States) Joe Caroccio
Strength and Conditioning Coach	(United States) Brook Hamilton

Last updated: November 13, 2011

== Squad ==
=== Roster ===
as of October 29, 2011

Note: Flags indicate national team as defined under FIFA eligibility rules; some limited exceptions apply. Players may hold more than one non-FIFA nationality.

No.	Pos.	Nation	Player
1	GK	USA	Nic Platter
2	DF	COL	Cristian Quiñones
5	DF	FIN	Toni Ståhl
6	DF	JAM	Lance Laing
7	FW	MEX	Polo Moráles (on loan from Tigres)
8	MF	BRA	Pecka
9	FW	USA	Abe Thompson
10	MF	USA	Mike Palacio
11	FW	USA	David Santamaria
12	FW	USA	Aaron Wheeler
13	DF	USA	Adam West
15	DF	USA	Scott Gordon
17	MF	USA	Bryan Arguez

No.	Pos.	Nation	Player
18	MF	COL	Yoximar Granado
19	MF	USA	Wálter Restrepo
20	MF	SLV	Gerson Mayen (on loan from Chivas USA)
21	MF	USA	Brian Shriver
22	DF	USA	Aaron Hohlbein (captain)
23	MF	URU	Martin Nuñez
24	GK	USA	Matt Glaeser
25	MF	USA	Patrick Otte
26	DF	PUR	Cristian Arrieta
27	DF	ENG	Martyn Lancaster
39	GK	USA	Phillip Lamarre
81	FW	HAI	Jean Philippe Peguero
88	MF	ARG	Eduardo Coudet

=== Transfers ===
==== In ====
Date	Player	Position	Previous club	Fee/notes	Ref
November 23, 2010	(United States) Aaron Wheeler	FW	(United States) FC Tampa Bay		
January 13, 2011	(United States) David Santamaria	FW	(United States)	Open tryout	
February 1, 2011	(United States) Aaron Hohlbein	DF	(United States) Columbus Crew	Rejected MLS side in favor or permanent return to Strikers	
February 22, 2011	(United States) Bryan Arguez	MF	(Portugal) Estoril Praia		
February 23, 2011	(Jamaica) Lance Laing	DF	(Jamaica) Village United	Open tryout	
February 24, 2011	(United States) Adam West	DF	(United States) Rochester Rhinos	NASL Combine	
February 24, 2011	(United States) Nic Platter	GK	(United States) Carolina RailHawks		
March 4, 2011	(Scotland) Grant Kerr	MF	(Cyprus) Digenis Akritas Morphou		
March 16, 2011	(United States) Mike Palacio	MF	(United States) New York Pancyprian-Freedoms		
March 28, 2011	(Argentina) Eduardo Coudet	MF	(United States) Philadelphia Union	Waived by Philadelphia	
March 30, 2011	(Puerto Rico) Cristian Arrieta	DF	(United States) Philadelphia Union	Waived by Philadelphia	
March 30, 2011	(United States) Patrick Otte	MF	(England) Middlesbrough		
March 30, 2011	(United States) Phillip Lamarre	GK	(United States) FC Tampa Bay		
April 1, 2011	(Finland) Toni Ståhl	DF	(United States) Philadelphia Union	Waived by Philadelphia	
April 1, 2011	(United States) Scott Gordon	DF	(United States) Lynn University	Drafted by FC Dallas, but not offered contract	
April 14, 2011	(Haiti) Jean Philippe Peguero	FW		Signed after two years out of the game	
April 14, 2011	(Colombia) Yoximar Granado	MF		Unsuccessful trial with Chicago Fire	
July 12, 2011	(United States) Wálter Restrepo	MF	(Colombia) Boyacá Chicó		
July 20, 2011	(El Salvador) Gerson Mayen	MF	(United States) Chivas USA	On loan until end of season	
August 18, 2011	(Mexico) Leopoldo Moráles	MF	(Mexico) Tigres	On loan until end of season	
August 19, 2011	(Colombia) Cristian Quiñones	DF	(United States) Atlanta Silverbacks	Recalled from loan	
August 22, 2011	(Brazil) Pecka	MF	(Brazil) Flamengo		

==== Out ====
Date	Player	Position	Destination club	Fee/notes	Ref
July 18, 2011	(United States) Zach Kirby	DF	Retired	Retires after struggling with injuries	
July 20, 2011	(Brazil) Lennon	MF		Returned to Brazil	
August 2011	(Brazil) Paulinho Le Petit	MF		Returned to Brazil	
August 19, 2011	(Scotland) Grant Kerr	MF	(United States) Atlanta Silverbacks	On loan until end of season	

== Competitions ==
Updated as published November 13, 2011.

=== Regular season ===
==== Standings ====
Overall

Pos	Team	Pld	W	D	L	GF	GA	GD	Pts	Qualification
2	Puerto Rico Islanders	28	15	7	6	41	32	+9	52	Playoff semifinals
3	Tampa Bay Rowdies	28	11	8	9	41	36	+5	41	Playoff quarterfinals
4	Fort Lauderdale Strikers	28	9	11	8	35	36	−1	38	Playoff quarterfinals
5	FC Edmonton	28	10	6	12	35	40	−5	36 (Note: EDM: 8 pts; MIN: 2 pts)	Playoff quarterfinals
6	NSC Minnesota Stars (C)	28	9	9	10	30	32	−2	36	Playoff quarterfinals

Source: NASL Standings
Rules for classification: 1) points; 2) head-to-head record; 3) goal difference; 4) number of goals scored.
(C) Champions

=== Playoffs ===
Quarterfinals
3	FC Tampa Bay	0
6	NSC Minnesota Stars	1
4	Fort Lauderdale Strikers	5
5	FC Edmonton	0

Semifinals
1	Carolina RailHawks FC	0	4	4 (3)
6	NSC Minnesota Stars	1	3	4 (5)
2	Puerto Rico Islanders	1	1	2
4	Fort Lauderdale Strikers	3	2	5

Soccer Bowl 2011
6	NSC Minnesota Stars	3	0	3
4	Fort Lauderdale Strikers	1	0	1

== Recognition ==
=== NASL Player of the Week ===
Week	Player	Category
10	(United States) Aaron Hohlbein (DF)	Defensive
12	(United States) Matt Glaeser (GK)	Defensive
17	(United States) Brian Shriver (FW)	Offensive
22	(El Salvador) Gerson Mayen (MF)	Offensive
