= 2007 Miami FC season =

Miami FC
2007 season
- Chairman: Aaron Davidson
- Manager: Chiquinho de Assis
- USL First Division: Ninth place
- USL First Division playoffs: did not qualify
- U.S. Open Cup: First round
- Top goalscorer: Charles Gbeke and Sébastien Le Toux (10)
Home colours	Away colours

The 2007 Miami FC season was the second season of the team in the USL First Division. This year, the team finished in ninth place for the regular season. They did not make the playoffs.

== USL First Division Regular season ==
=== Standings ===
==== First Division ====
Commissioner's Cup, quarterfinal round of playoffs
Quarterfinal round of playoffs

Pos	Club	Pts	Pld	W	L	T	GF	GA	GD
1	Seattle Sounders	54	28	16	6	6	37	23	+14
2	Portland Timbers	51	28	14	5	9	32	18	+14
3	Montreal Impact	50	28	14	6	8	32	21	+11
4	Atlanta Silverbacks	43	28	12	9	7	40	30	+10
5	Rochester Raging Rhinos	42	28	12	10	6	39	36	+3
6	Puerto Rico Islanders	40	28	10	8	10	35	34	+1
7	Vancouver Whitecaps	39	28	9	7	12	27	24	+3
8	Carolina RailHawks	32	28	8	12	8	24	34	−10
9	Miami FC	31	28	9	15	4	31	41	−10
10	Charleston Battery	30	28	8	14	6	32	39	−7
11	Minnesota Thunder	26	28	5	12	11	32	35	−3
12	California Victory	19	28	4	17	7	17	43	−26
