= 2006 Miami FC season =

Miami FC
2006 season
- Chairman: Aaron Davidson
- Manager: Chiquinho de Assis
- USL First Division: Fifth place
- USL First Division playoffs: First round
- U.S. Open Cup: Second round
- Top goalscorer: Romário and Cam Weaver (18)
Home colours	Away colours

The 2006 Miami FC season was the first season of the new team and club in the USL First Division. This year, the team finished in fifth place for the regular season and made it to the first round of the playoffs.

== Regular season ==
=== Standings ===
==== First Division ====
Commissioner's Cup, bye to semifinal round of playoffs
Bye to semifinal round of playoffs
First round of playoffs

Pos	Club	Pts	Pld	W	L	T	GF	GA	GD	H2H Pts
1	Montreal Impact	51	28	14	5	9	31	15	+16	
2	Rochester Raging Rhinos	50	28	13	4	11	34	21	+13	
3	Charleston Battery	46	28	13	8	7	33	25	+8	CHA: 4 pts VAN: 1 pt
4	Vancouver Whitecaps	46	28	12	6	10	40	28	+12	CHA: 4 pts VAN: 1 pt
5	Miami FC	39	28	11	11	6	47	44	+3	
6	Puerto Rico Islanders	38	28	10	10	8	38	36	+2	
7	Seattle Sounders	37	28	11	13	4	42	48	−6	
8	Atlanta Silverbacks	35	28	10	13	5	36	42	−6	
9	Virginia Beach Mariners	32	28	8	12	8	26	37	−11	VBM: 7 pts TOR: 4 pts
10	Toronto Lynx	32	28	8	12	8	30	36	−6	VBM: 7 pts TOR: 4 pts
11	Portland Timbers	27	28	7	15	6	25	39	−14	POR: 9 pts MIN: 3 pts
12	Minnesota Thunder	27	28	7	15	6	34	45	−11	POR: 9 pts MIN: 3 pts

===== Playoffs =====
Quarterfinals and Semifinals 2-game aggregate
Higher seeded team hosted first game

- Exception: Montreal hosted second game vs Vancouver

Quarterfinals
3	Charleston Battery	2	1	3
6	Puerto Rico Islanders	2	0	2
4	Vancouver Whitecaps	4	2	6
5	Miami FC	1	0	1

Semifinals
2	Rochester Raging Rhinos	1	0	1
3	Charleston Battery	0	0	0
4	Vancouver Whitecaps (a.e.t.)	0	2	2
1	Montreal Impact	0	0	0

Finals
2	Rochester Raging Rhinos	0
4	Vancouver Whitecaps	3
