= Fort Lauderdale Stadium =

Stadium in Fort Lauderdale, United States

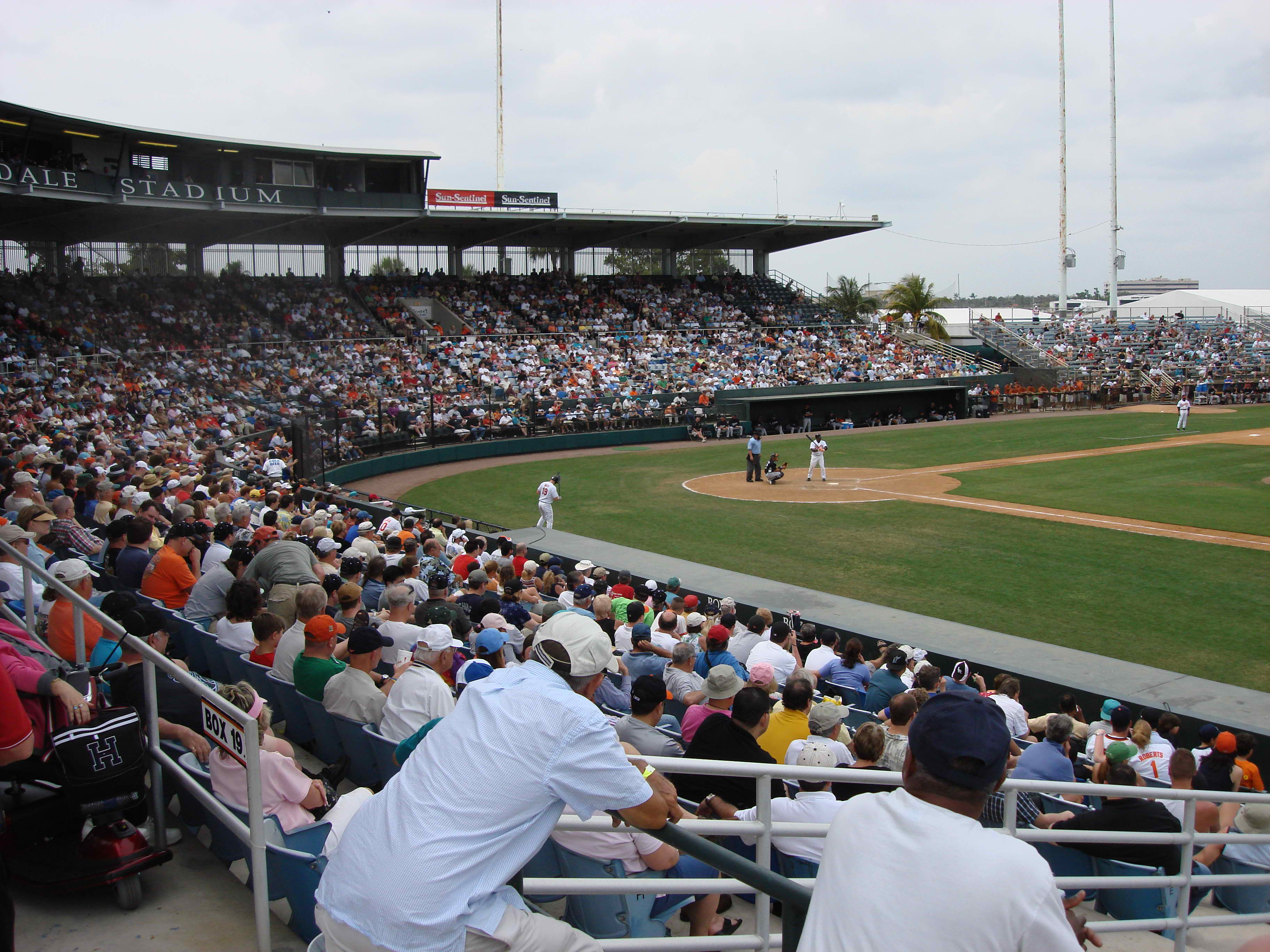
- Inside Fort Lauderdale Stadium

- Location within Florida Location within the United States
- Interactive map of Fort Lauderdale Stadium
- Full name: Fort Lauderdale Municipal Stadium
- Address: 1401 NW 55th Street; Fort Lauderdale, Florida 33309
- Coordinates: 26°11′44″N 80°9′40″W
- Owner: City of Fort Lauderdale
- Capacity: 8,340 (7,800 in 1962)
- Surface: Grass
- Field size: Left - 332 ft. Center - 401 ft. Right - 320 ft.

Construction
- Opened: 1962
- Demolished: June 15, 2019
- Cost: $800,000

Tenants
- New York Yankees (AL) (spring training) 1962–1995; Fort Lauderdale Yankees (FSL) 1962–1992; Fort Lauderdale Red Sox (FSL) 1993; Baltimore Orioles (AL) (spring training) 1996–2009; Federal League Semi-Pro Baseball 1996–2010; Fort Lauderdale Strikers (training) 2010–2016

Fort Lauderdale Stadium was a baseball stadium located in Fort Lauderdale, Florida, next to Lockhart Stadium which was built for soccer and outdoors events.

The stadium was demolished in June 2019 as part of the construction of Inter Miami CF Stadium for Inter Miami CF.

The New York Yankees announced in March 1961 they would move their spring training location from St. Petersburg, Florida, to Fort Lauderdale, Florida, where a new stadium would be built for the team at an estimated cost of $500,000 with 4,000 covered seats and 4,000 bleacher seats.

The Yankees trained at the stadium between 1962 and 1995.

The Fort Lauderdale Yankees of the minor league Florida State League played home games in the stadium from 1962 through 1992. The Fort Lauderdale Red Sox played home games there in 1993, after an unsuccessful attempt to move from Winter Haven to Fort Myers (they ended up the following year in Sarasota).

The Baltimore Orioles held spring training at the stadium from 1996 to 2009.

Fort Lauderdale Stadium was last leased to Traffic Sports USA (owners of the Fort Lauderdale Strikers) in June 2011.
