= 2009 Miami FC season =

Miami FC
2009 season
- Chairman: Aaron Davidson
- Manager: Zinho
- USL First Division: Ninth place
- USL First Division playoffs: did not qualify
- U.S. Open Cup: Second round
- Top goalscorer: Charles Gbeke (12)
Home colours	Away colours

The 2009 Miami FC season was the fourth season of the team in the USL First Division. After playing in Miami for three years, the team moved in this period to Fort Lauderdale. This year, the team finished in ninth place for the regular season. They did not make the playoffs. This was the last year of the team in the league as it eventually joined a group of other clubs that would leave the USL to form the new North American Soccer League. However, the team would play the following year in the USSF Division 2.

== USL First Division Regular season ==
=== Standings ===
Commissioner's Cup, bye to semifinal round of playoffs
Quarterfinal round of playoffs

Pos	Club	Pts	Pld	W	L	T	GF	GA	GD	H2H Pts
1	Portland Timbers	58	30	16	4	10	45	19	+26	
2	Carolina RailHawks	55	30	16	7	7	43	19	+24	
3	Puerto Rico Islanders	53	30	15	7	8	44	31	+13	PUE: 6 pts CHA: 3 pts
4	Charleston Battery	53	30	14	6	10	33	21	+12	PUE: 6 pts CHA: 3 pts
5	Montreal Impact	44	30	12	10	8	32	31	+1	
6	Rochester Rhinos	43	30	11	9	10	34	32	+2	
7	Vancouver Whitecaps	42	30	11	10	9	42	36	+6	
8	Minnesota Thunder	31	30	7	13	10	39	44	−5	
9	Miami FC	29	30	8	17	5	26	52	−26	
10	Austin Aztex	21^{†}	30	5	17	8	28	51	−23	
11	Cleveland City Stars	19	30	4	19	7	22	52	−30	

^{†} Austin deducted two points for fielding an ineligible player on July 25, 2009

=== Results ===
Abbreviation and Color Key: Austin Aztex - AUS • Carolina RailHawks - CAR • Charleston Battery - CHA • Cleveland City Stars - CLE • Miami FC - MIA • Minnesota Thunder - MIN • Montreal Impact - MTL • Portland Timbers - POR • Puerto Rico Islanders - PUE • Rochester Rhinos - ROC • Vancouver Whitecaps FC - VAN Win • Loss • Tie • Home
Club	Match																													
Club	1	2	3	4	5	6	7	8	9	10	11	12	13	14	15	16	17	18	19	20	21	22	23	24	25	26	27	28	29	30
Austin Aztex	MIN	VAN	CLE	PUE	MTL	CAR	PUE	CHA	CHA	PUE	MIA	CAR	ROC	CLE	CLE	ROC	POR	MIN	MTL	CHA	CAR	ROC	MIN	MTL	MIA	VAN	MIA	POR	POR	VAN
Austin Aztex	1-1	1-1	3-0	1-1	4-0	0-1	3-1	0-2	1-1	1-4	0-2	1-1	0-2	2-2	0-1	4-1	1-2	1-0	2-2	1-0	0-3	1-0	2-2	2-0	1-0	3-2	3-1	0-1	1-2	2-1
Carolina RailHawks	MIN	ROC	MIN	POR	POR	CHA	MIA	CLE	AUS	CLE	POR	MIN	AUS	PUE	CHA	VAN	CHA	MIA	AUS	ROC	CLE	VAN	VAN	ROC	MIA	MTL	MTL	PUE	PUE	MTL
Carolina RailHawks	2-1	1-0	1-0	0-0	2-0	1-2	0-2	0-3	0-1	1-0	0-0	2-0	1-1	1-2	0-1	2-1	2-1	4-0	3-0	0-1	2-0	0-0	1-1	0-0	9-0	1-1	1-0	2-0	2-1	2-0
Charleston Battery	VAN	MTL	MIN	MIA	CAR	MTL	MIA	ROC	CLE	AUS	AUS	POR	PUE	PUE	PUE	MTL	CAR	CLE	ROC	CAR	AUS	VAN	POR	CLE	VAN	POR	MIN	MIA	ROC	MIN
Charleston Battery	0-0	0-0	1-1	0-1	1-2	0-0	1-0	2-0	2-0	0-2	1-1	1-1	1-0	1-0	1-0	0-1	0-1	0-0	1-1	2-1	1-0	1-2	3-1	4-1	1-1	0-0	1-3	2-1	0-0	2-3
Cleveland City Stars	MIA	AUS	ROC	POR	MIN	CAR	CAR	CHA	PUE	PUE	ROC	MIA	MIA	VAN	AUS	AUS	PUE	CHA	MTL	ROC	VAN	CAR	CHA	MTL	MIN	MIN	MTL	POR	POR	VAN
Cleveland City Stars	3-1	3-0	0-3	0-0	0-1	0-3	1-0	2-0	2-1	2-2	3-0	1-2	0-1	2-2	2-2	0-1	0-0	0-0	4-1	4-1	0-0	2-0	4-1	1-2	1-0	3-0	1-2	0-1	2-1	2-1
Miami FC	CLE	MTL	ROC	CHA	CAR	CHA	MIN	VAN	AUS	CLE	CLE	MTL	PUE	VAN	POR	POR	MIN	CAR	MTL	PUE	MIN	POR	VAN	CAR	AUS	AUS	ROC	CHA	ROC	PUE
Miami FC	3-1	2-1	1-2	0-1	0-2	1-0	0-0	3-2	2-0	1-2	0-1	1-0	0-0	2-1	1-1	0-3	1-2	4-0	1-1	4-0	0-1	3-1	0-2	9-0	1-0	3-1	1-2	2-1	0-0	3-1
Minnesota Thunder	CAR	AUS	CHA	CAR	VAN	CLE	MIA	PUE	ROC	CAR	POR	ROC	POR	VAN	MTL	AUS	MIA	POR	MTL	MIA	AUS	ROC	CLE	CLE	PUE	VAN	CHA	PUE	MTL	CHA
Minnesota Thunder	2-1	1-1	1-1	1-0	3-2	1-0	0-0	1-0	0-0	2-0	5-1	1-2	1-1	4-0	3-0	1-0	1-2	1-1	1-0	0-1	2-2	3-3	1-0	3-0	3-1	1-1	1-3	5-2	1-1	2-3
Montreal Impact	CHA	MIA	PUE	ROC	CHA	AUS	ROC	POR	VAN	VAN	MIA	POR	CHA	MIN	ROC	PUE	CLE	AUS	MIA	MIN	POR	PUE	CLE	AUS	CAR	CAR	CLE	VAN	MIN	CAR
Montreal Impact	0-0	2-1	3-2	1-2	0-0	4-0	0-1	1-0	1-2	2-1	1-0	4-0	0-1	2-0	0-0	0-1	4-1	2-2	1-1	1-0	0-1	1-0	1-2	2-0	1-1	1-0	1-2	1-0	1-1	2-0
Portland Timbers	VAN	CAR	CAR	CLE	ROC	PUE	PUE	VAN	MTL	CAR	CHA	MIN	MTL	MIN	AUS	MIA	MIA	PUE	MIN	VAN	CHA	MTL	ROC	MIA	CHA	ROC	AUS	AUS	CLE	CLE
Portland Timbers	1-0	0-0	2-0	0-0	2-1	1-1	1-2	2-0	1-0	0-0	1-1	5-1	4-0	1-1	1-2	1-1	0-3	0-0	1-1	1-0	3-1	0-1	1-4	3-1	0-0	1-2	0-1	1-2	0-1	2-1
Puerto Rico Islanders	VAN	ROC	MTL	AUS	VAN	POR	POR	AUS	MIN	CLE	CLE	AUS	CHA	CHA	CHA	CAR	MIA	ROC	CLE	MTL	POR	VAN	MIA	MTL	MIN	ROC	CAR	MIN	CAR	MIA
Puerto Rico Islanders	2-1	0-0	3-2	1-1	1-0	1-1	1-2	3-1	1-2	2-1	2-2	4-1	1-0	1-0	1-0	1-2	0-0	0-0	0-0	0-1	0-0	4-2	4-0	1-0	3-1	2-0	2-0	5-2	2-1	3-1
Rochester Rhinos	CAR	PUE	MIA	CLE	MTL	POR	VAN	CHA	MTL	MIN	CLE	AUS	MIN	AUS	PUE	MTL	CHA	CLE	VAN	CAR	AUS	POR	MIN	CAR	VAN	POR	PUE	MIA	MIA	CHA
Rochester Rhinos	1-0	0-0	1-2	0-3	1-2	2-1	1-2	2-0	0-1	0-0	3-0	0-2	1-2	4-1	0-0	0-0	1-1	4-1	1-3	0-1	1-0	1-4	3-3	0-0	1-1	1-2	2-0	1-2	0-0	0-0
Vancouver Whitecaps FC	CHA	PUE	AUS	POR	MIN	PUE	ROC	POR	MTL	MIA	MTL	CLE	MIN	MIA	CAR	PUE	ROC	CLE	POR	CHA	CAR	CAR	CHA	MIA	ROC	AUS	MIN	MTL	AUS	CLE
Vancouver Whitecaps FC	0-0	2-1	1-1	1-0	2-3	1-0	1-2	2-0	1-2	3-2	2-1	2-2	4-0	2-1	2-1	4-2	1-3	0-0	1-0	1-2	0-0	1-1	1-1	2-0	1-1	3-2	1-1	1-0	2-1	2-1
