= 2008 Miami FC season =

Miami FC
2008 season
- Chairman: Aaron Davidson
- Manager: Zinho
- USL First Division: Ninth place
- USL First Division playoffs: did not qualify
- U.S. Open Cup: Third round
- Top goalscorer: Alex Afonso (15)
Home colours	Away colours

The 2008 Miami FC season was the third season of the team in the USL First Division. This year, the team finished in ninth place for the regular season. They did not make the playoffs.

== USL First Division Regular season ==
=== Standings ===
==== First Division ====
Commissioner's Cup, bye to semifinal round of playoffs
First round of playoffs

Pos	Club	Pts	Pld	W	L	T	GF	GA	GD	H2H Pts
1	Puerto Rico Islanders	54	30	15	6	9	43	23	+20	
2	Vancouver Whitecaps	53	30	15	7	8	34	28	+6	
3	Montreal Impact	42	30	12	12	6	33	28	+5	
4	Rochester Rhinos	41^{†}	30	11	10	9	35	32	+3	
5	Charleston Battery	40	30	11	12	7	34	36	−2	CHA: 4 pts SEA: 4 pts
6	Seattle Sounders	40	30	10	10	10	37	36	+1	CHA: 4 pts SEA: 4 pts
7	Minnesota Thunder	39	30	10	11	9	40	38	+2	
8	Carolina RailHawks	37	30	9	11	10	34	43	−9	
9	Miami FC	34	30	8	12	10	28	34	−6	MIA: 7 pts ATL: 1 pt
10	Atlanta Silverbacks	34	30	8	12	10	37	50	−13	MIA: 7 pts ATL: 1 pt
11	Portland Timbers	31	30	7	13	10	26	33	−7	

Tie-breaker order: 1. Head-to-head points; 2. Total wins; 3. Goal difference; 4. Goals for; 5. Lottery
^{†} Rochester deducted 1 point for use of an ineligible player on August 10, 2008
