= Michael Tetteh =

Ghanaian footballer (b.1989)

Personal information
- Full name: Michael Osakonor Tetteh
- Date of birth: 16 January 1989 (age 37)
- Place of birth: Odumase Krobo, Ghana
- Height: 5 ft 8 in (1.73 m)
- Position: Midfielder

Youth career
- 1999–2004: Right to Dream Academy
- 2005–2007: Santa Barbara Soccer Club

College career
Years	Team	Apps	(Gls)
2008–2010	UC Santa Barbara Gauchos	59	(6)

Senior career*
Years	Team	Apps	(Gls)
2011–2012	Seattle Sounders FC	0	(0)
2011	→ Orlando City (loan)	3	(0)
2012	→ Fort Lauderdale Strikers (loan)	3	(0)
- * Club domestic league appearances and goals

Michael Osakonor Tetteh (born 16 January 1989) is a former Ghanaian footballer.

== Early life and education ==
Tetteh spent his youth career with Right to Dream Academy for six years and the Santa Barbara Soccer Club for three years before playing college soccer at UC Santa Barbara for the Gauchos. He was named Second Team All-Big West and Second Team Far West All-Region in 2009. Tetteh played in 59 games in his three years at UC Santa Barbara and scored 6 goals with 8 assists.

== Playing career ==
Tetteh was signed by Major League Soccer to a Generation Adidas contract and was subsequently drafted 20th overall in the 2011 MLS SuperDraft by Seattle Sounders FC on 13 January 2011.

He made his professional debut in a 2–1 win over Kitsap Pumas in the Lamar Hunt US Open Cup playing the full 90 minutes on 28 June 2011.

To gain more match experience, Tetteh was loaned to USL Pro club Orlando City SC on 29 June 2011 on a 10-day contract and returned to Seattle by 12 July. While with Orlando City, Tetteh appeared in three matches.

Tetteh was sent out on loan again, to the Fort Lauderdale Strikers of the North American Soccer League on 24 August 2012.

On 14 December 2012, the Sounders declined to pick up a contract option on Tetteh.

== Career statistics ==
Club performance			League		Cup		League Cup		Total	
Season	Club	League	Apps	Goals	Apps	Goals	Apps	Goals	Apps	Goals
USA			League		Open Cup		League Cup		Total	
2011	Seattle Sounders FC	Major League Soccer	0	0	1	0	0	0	1	0
2011	Orlando City (loan)	USL Pro	3	0	0	0	0	0	3	0
2012	Seattle Sounders FC	Major League Soccer	0	0	0	0	—		0	0
2012	Fort Lauderdale Strikers (loan)	North American Soccer League	3	0	0	0	1	0	4	0
Total	USA		6	0	1	0	1	0	8	0
Career total			6	0	1	0	1	0	8	0

== Awards and honors ==
=== Seattle Sounders FC ===
- Lamar Hunt US Open Cup (1): 2011
