= New Orleans Storm =

The New Orleans Riverboat Gamblers was an American soccer club that competed in the USISL from 1993 to 1999. Based in New Orleans, Louisiana, the club was renamed the New Orleans Storm in 1998. The team folded after the 1999 season.

== History ==
On March 12, 1993, New Orleans Riverboat Gamblers owner Donnie Pate announced the creation of the team. The Riverboat Gamblers played their home games at Pan American Stadium, a 5,000 person stadium in the New Orleans City Park. Pate also announced that Ken White would coach the team with assistance from Mike Jeffries. Wearing a red, white and blue uniform, the Gamblers played their first regular season game on May 15, 1993 against the Birmingham Grasshoppers. The Gamblers spent their first season in the Southern Challenge Cup (Provisional), a group of four teams which played an eight-game schedule separate from the rest of the USISL. In 1994, they moved to the Midsouth Division where they placed second behind the Louisville Thoroughbreds. In July 1994, Patrick Olalere, the teams's leading scorer became the first New Orleans' player to move up when he signed with the Fort Lauderdale Strikers. In January 1995, White left the team and Mike Jeffries became head coach. The 1995 season also saw the USISL split between a Professional (Division 3) and Premier (Amateur) League. The Gamblers moved to the South Central Division in the Professional League. In 1996, the USISL again reorganized, this time into three leagues. The Gamblers joined the Central Division of the newly created Select (Division 2) League. The team also formed partnership with the Dallas Burn of Major League Soccer in which the Gamblers served as a farm team for the Burn. In December 1996, New Orleans again changed leagues as the USISL and A-League merged to form the second division USISL A-League. The team also changed stadiums to Tad Gormley Stadium which could seat 26,500 fans. That season, the Gamblers went to the Division finals. In November 1997, Rob Couhig, owner of the New Orleans Zephyrs baseball team, purchased the Gamblers from Donnie Pate. Couhig renamed the team the New Orleans Storm and moved it to Zephyr Field which seated only 10,000 but had natural grass as compared to the artificial turf of Tad Gormley Stadium. The team also changed its colors to purple, gray and black to match the colors of the Zephyrs baseball team.

In February 1998, Bill Jeffries left to become an assistant with the Chicago Fire and Daryl Shore was elevated to head coach. In January 1999, Danny Rebuck replaced Daryl Shore as head coach. In February 2000, Couhig announced the Storm was suspending operations.

== Year-by-year ==
| Year | Division | League | Reg. season | Playoffs | Open Cup |
|---|---|---|---|---|---|
| 1993 | N/A | USISL (provisional) | 1st, Southern Challenge Cup | N/A | Did not enter |
| 1994 | N/A | USISL | 2nd, Midsouth | Divisional Semifinals | Did not enter |
| 1995 | 3 | USISL Pro League | 5th, South Central | Did not qualify | Did not qualify |
| 1996 | 2 | USISL Select League | 3rd, Central | 1st Round | Did not qualify |
| 1997 | 2 | USISL A-League | 1st, Central | Division Finals | 3rd Round |
| 1998 | 2 | USISL A-League | 4th, Central | Conference Semifinals | Did not qualify |
| 1999 | 2 | USL A-League | 3rd, Central | Conference Quarterfinals | Did not qualify |

== Coaches ==
- Ken White (1993–1994)
- Mike Jeffries (1995–1998)
- Daryl Shore (1998)
- Danny Rebuck (1999)

== See also ==
- New Orleans Jesters
