= Abel Gebor =

Liberian footballer

Personal information
- Full name: Abel Gebor
- Date of birth: August 27, 1990 (age 36)
- Place of birth: Sinoe County, Liberia
- Height: 1.78 m (5 ft 10 in)
- Position: Midfielder

Team information
- Current team: Bhayangkara Surabaya United
- Number: 14

Youth career
- 2008: Tyler Apache
- 2009: Lon Morris Bearcats

Senior career*
Years	Team	Apps	(Gls)
2010	Fort Lauderdale Schulz Academy	3	(0)
2012	Fort Lauderdale Strikers	6	(0)
2014	Malchower SV	15	(2)
2014	Honka	2	(0)
2015	Tërbuni Pukë	4	(0)
2016–	Bhayangkara Surabaya United	1	(0)

International career^{‡}
2015	Liberia	3	(0)
- * Club domestic league appearances and goals as of March 22, 2016 ‡ National team caps and goals as of March 22, 2016

Abel Gebor (born August 27, 1990) is a Liberian footballer who plays for Bhayangkara Surabaya United as a midfielder.

== College and amateur ==
Gebor had a short spell in college soccer, spending time with Tyler Junior College and Lon Morris College. In 2010, Gebor played three games for Fort Lauderdale Schulz Academy in the USL Premier Development League.

== Professional ==
On March 13, 2012, Gebor signed with NASL club Fort Lauderdale Strikers. He made his debut on April 25 in a 3–2 win against the Puerto Rico Islanders. Gebor played in the Finnish top flight with Honka in 2014 before moving to Tërbuni Pukë in Albania during the 2015 transfer period.

== National team ==
Abel Gebor was called up to play for Liberia during their away fixture against Togo on June 14, 2015 in Lome, the capital of Togo. The hard working defensive midfielder earned the trust of Lone Star coach James Debbah during the national team's two international test matches in Ghana ahead of the Togo clash. He played 20 minutes of the 2–1 away defeat for the Liberian national team against Togo in the 2017 African Cup of Nations qualification game, but he was very impressive and former FIFA 1995 World Best footballer George Weah praised the defensive midfielder speeding ability.

Lone Star coach James Debbah recently called Abel Gebor to help qualified the home base Lone Star team over Guinea in the CHAN qualification game, but they settled 1–1 in Monrovia on July 5, 2015, The local Lone Star needed 2–0 home win but the game ended 1–1. but Abel was one of the best player on the best on Sunday. Gebor came on during the 81st minute against Guinea Bissau on October 13, 2015 when Liberia won 1–3 through William Jebro hat-trick. Liberia advanced to the round two of the Russia 2018 qualification stage.
