= Scott Lorenz =

American soccer player

Personal information
- Full name: Scott Lorenz
- Date of birth: July 23, 1987 (age 39)
- Place of birth: Barrington, Illinois, United States
- Height: 6 ft 0 in (1.83 m)
- Position: Defender

Youth career
- Chicago Sockers

College career
Years	Team	Apps	(Gls)
2005–2009	Wisconsin Badgers	71	(14)

Senior career*
Years	Team	Apps	(Gls)
2007–2008	Princeton 56ers		
2009	Chicago Fire NPSL		
2010	NSC Minnesota Stars	19	(0)
2011	Sporting Kansas City	1	(0)
2011	→ NSC Minnesota Stars (loan)	8	(0)
2012	Fort Lauderdale Strikers	22	(0)
2016–2019	Milwaukee Bavarian		
- * Club domestic league appearances and goals as of September 24, 2012

Scott Lorenz (born June 23, 1987) is an American soccer player.

== Career ==
=== College and amateur ===
Lorenz attended Barrington High School. At Barrington he played on both the soccer and volleyball teams. Playing volleyball he won all-area and all-conference honors. He also played club soccer for FC 96ers and the Chicago Sockers before playing college soccer at the University of Wisconsin. At UW he was twice named to the All-Big Ten Second Team, as a junior in 2008 and as a senior in 2009, and finished his collegiate career with 14 goals in 71 appearances for the Badgers.

During his college years Lorenz also played with the Princeton 56ers and Chicago Fire NPSL in the National Premier Soccer League.

=== Professional ===
Undrafted out of college, Lorenz signed his first professional contract in 2010 when he was signed by the NSC Minnesota Stars of the USSF Division 2 Professional League. He made his professional debut on May 22, 2010, in a game against Miami FC, and went on to play 19 games for the Stars in his debut pro season.

Lorenz signed with Major League Soccer outfit Sporting Kansas City on March 1, 2011, and made his MLS debut on March 26, 2011, in a 3–2 loss to the Chicago Fire.

On July 29, 2011, Sporting Kansas City announced that Lorenz would be sent on-loan to his former club NSC Minnesota Stars for the remainder of the 2011 season. Lorenz re-joined Kansas City when the loan was terminated on September 8, 2011. Lorenz was waived by Kansas City on November 23, 2011.

Lorenz signed with Fort Lauderdale Strikers of the North American Soccer League on February 13, 2012.
