= Jack Stewart (soccer) =

American soccer player

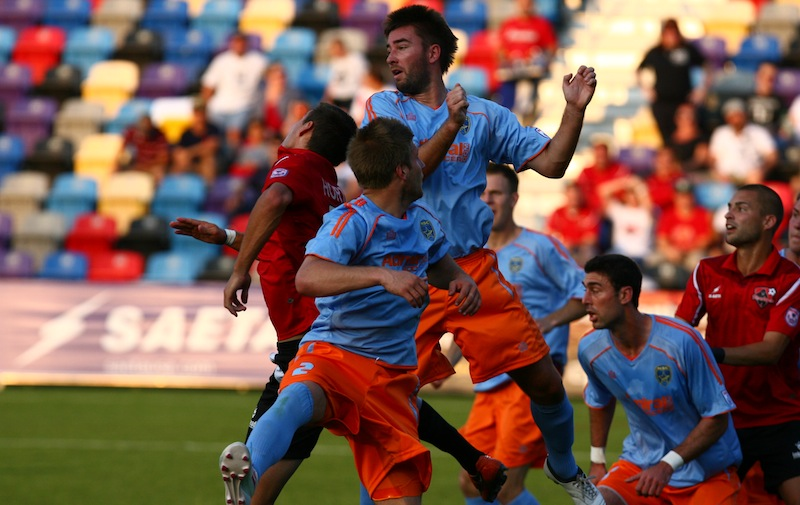

Personal information
- Full name: Jack Stewart
- Date of birth: May 29, 1983 (age 43)
- Place of birth: Torrance, California, United States
- Height: 6 ft 3 in (1.91 m)
- Position: Defender

Youth career
- 2001–2004: Notre Dame Fighting Irish

Senior career*
Years	Team	Apps	(Gls)
2004	Indiana Invaders		
2005–2006	Chicago Fire	14	(2)
2006–2007	Real Salt Lake	25	(0)
2008	Moss FK	0	(0)
2008	Nybergsund	0	(0)
2009	Carolina RailHawks	6	(0)
2011	NSC Minnesota Stars	15	(0)
2011	→ FC Dallas (loan)	2	(1)
2012	Fort Lauderdale Strikers	20	(0)
- * Club domestic league appearances and goals as of September 28, 2012

Jack Stewart (born May 29, 1983, in Torrance, California) is an American soccer player who last played for Fort Lauderdale Strikers of the North American Soccer League.

== Career ==
=== High school ===
Stewart attended South High School Torrance, CA, where he was a standout player voted to All-League and All-CIF awards.

=== College and amateur ===
Stewart played college soccer at the University of Notre Dame, where he was named All-Big East his junior and senior seasons. He also played for Indiana Invaders in the USL Premier Development League.

=== Professional ===
Stewart was drafted tenth overall pick in the 2005 MLS SuperDraft by Chicago Fire, but he saw limited action with the team in his rookie season. He was traded to Real Salt Lake on July 25, 2006, in exchange for Ryan Johnson. He was waived by Salt Lake at the end of the 2007 season.

In 2008 Stewart signed with Moss FK of the Norwegian Adeccoligaen, but was released midseason without an appearance. He later moved to Nybergsund IL. On February 13, 2009, he signed with the Carolina RailHawks of the USL First Division.

After a year out of the game in 2010, Stewart returned to the field in 2011 when he signed with the NSC Minnesota Stars in the North American Soccer League. He was loaned to FC Dallas of Major League Soccer on August 15, 2011, for the remainder of the 2011 MLS season. FC Dallas declined a purchase option at the end of the loan.

Stewart scored his first goal for Dallas in a CONCACAF Champions League group stage match, scoring the match-winning goal in a 1–0 victory over Toronto FC.

On March 6, 2012, Minnesota traded Stewart to Fort Lauderdale Strikers in exchange for Martin Nuñez.

=== International ===
Although born in the US, Stewart has trained with the Canadian men's national soccer team due to his ancestry. He has yet to be capped by either nation, and had not formally pledged international commitment to either Canada or the United States.
