= Alfonso Motagalvan =

American soccer player (born 1987)

Personal information
- Full name: Felix Alfonso Motagalvan
- Date of birth: February 11, 1987 (age 39)
- Place of birth: Santa Rosa, California, United States
- Height: 5 ft 11 in (1.80 m)
- Position: Midfielder

Youth career
- 2001–2004: Gilroy High School

College career
| Years | Team | Apps | (Gls) |
| 2005–2008 | UC Santa Barbara Gauchos | | |

Senior career*
| Years | Team | Apps | (Gls) |
| 2007–2009 | Ventura County Fusion | 34 | (2) |
| 2010–2011 | Rochester Rhinos | 58 | (2) |
| 2012 | Fort Lauderdale Strikers | 16 | (0) |
| 2013–2014 | Pittsburgh Riverhounds | 40 | (1) |
| 2015–2016 | Sacramento Republic FC | 22 | (0) |

International career^{‡}
| 2014– | United States beach | 1 | (0) |
- * Club domestic league appearances and goals as of 15:18, September 30, 2016 (UTC) ‡ National team caps and goals as of 15:18, September 3, 2014 (UTC)

Felix Alfonso Motagalvan (born February 11, 1987) is an American soccer player.

== Playing career ==
=== Youth and college ===
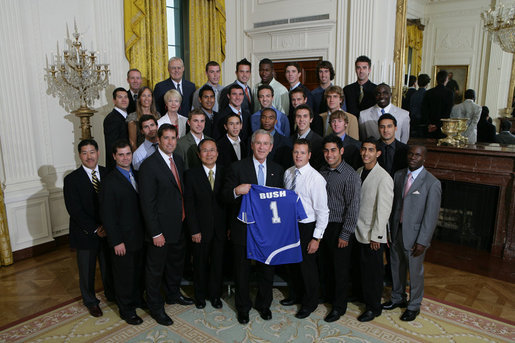
Motagalvan and the 2006 UCSB Gauchos soccer team honored at the White House.

Motagalvan was born in Santa Rosa, California, grew up in Gilroy, California, and attended Gilroy High School where he was a two-time NSCAA/adidas All-American. He played club soccer for Santa Clara Sporting Ruckus from 2004 to 2005, and was a two-year member of the Region IV Olympic Development Team and Super Y-League Select National Team.

He played four years of college soccer at the University of California, Santa Barbara, featuring in over 50 games during his four seasons, and playing an instrumental part of the Gauchos' run to the 2006 NCAA Division I title.

During his college years he also played for Ventura County Fusion in the USL Premier Development League, scoring the winning goal in the 2009 PDL Championship Game.

=== Professional ===
While in College Motagalvan played with the Chivas USA reserve team during 2008 and 2009.

In 2009, he was called in to preseason with the San Jose Earthquakes of the MLS. Later that year he went on to FC Dallas of the MLS to finish the 2009 season with the reserve team.

==== Rochester Rhinos ====
He signed with Rochester Rhinos on February 16, 2010, and made his professional debut on April 10, 2010, in Rochester's season opening game against Miami FC. Motagalvan played in 28 of the Rhinos' 30 USSF Division 2 matches, in addition to both playoff games.

He scored his first professional goal on April 23, 2011, a 3–2 win over the Dayton Dutch Lions. He played in 21 regular season matches in the 2011 USL Pro season, scoring twice, in addition to playing in both playoff games.

==== Fort Lauderdale Strikers ====
On February 3, 2012, it was announced that Fort Lauderdale Strikers of the North American Soccer League had signed Motagalvan.

==== Pittsburgh Riverhounds ====
Motagalvan joined the Riverhounds in 2013.

==== Sacramento Republic ====
Although he had briefly considered retiring, Motagalvan joined Sacramento Republic.

== Coaching career ==
Motagalvan aspires to move full-time into coaching after his playing days. While still an active player, he served as an assistant coach for Folsom Lake College's men's soccer program.

=== International ===
Motagalvan was called up to the United States national beach soccer team in August 2014.

== Honors ==
=== Rochester Rhinos ===
- USSF Division 2 Pro League Regular Season Champions (1): 2010

=== Ventura County Fusion ===
- USL Premier Development League Champions (1): 2009
