= Nickardo Blake =

Jamaican footballer (born 1989)

Personal information
- Full name: Nickardo Blake
- Date of birth: November 26, 1989 (age 36)
- Place of birth: Clarendon, Jamaica
- Height: 1.85 m (6 ft 1 in)
- Position: Defender

College career
Years	Team	Apps	(Gls)
2008–2009	East Central Falcons		
2010–2011	Connecticut Huskies	44	(2)

Senior career*
Years	Team	Apps	(Gls)
2012	Fort Lauderdale Strikers	20	(0)
2015–2017	Boca Raton FC	31	(4)
- * Club domestic league appearances and goals as of 22 July 2017

Nickardo Blake (born November 26, 1989) is a Jamaican-American retired footballer.

== Career ==
Born in Clarendon, Jamaica, Blake was selected by Toronto FC as the 14th pick of the 2012 MLS Supplemental Draft. He joined the club during preseason camp, but was let go shortly after. Blake returned to Florida where he was invited to spend preseason with his local club, the Fort Lauderdale Strikers. On March 28, 2012, the Strikers announced that Blake had signed professional terms with the club.

Blake made his professional debut with the Strikers against FC Edmonton on April 7, 2012, in the first game of the 2012 NASL season. He played the entire 90 minutes at right back in the 1–0 victory.
