= Aaron Wheeler (soccer) =

American soccer player (born 1988)

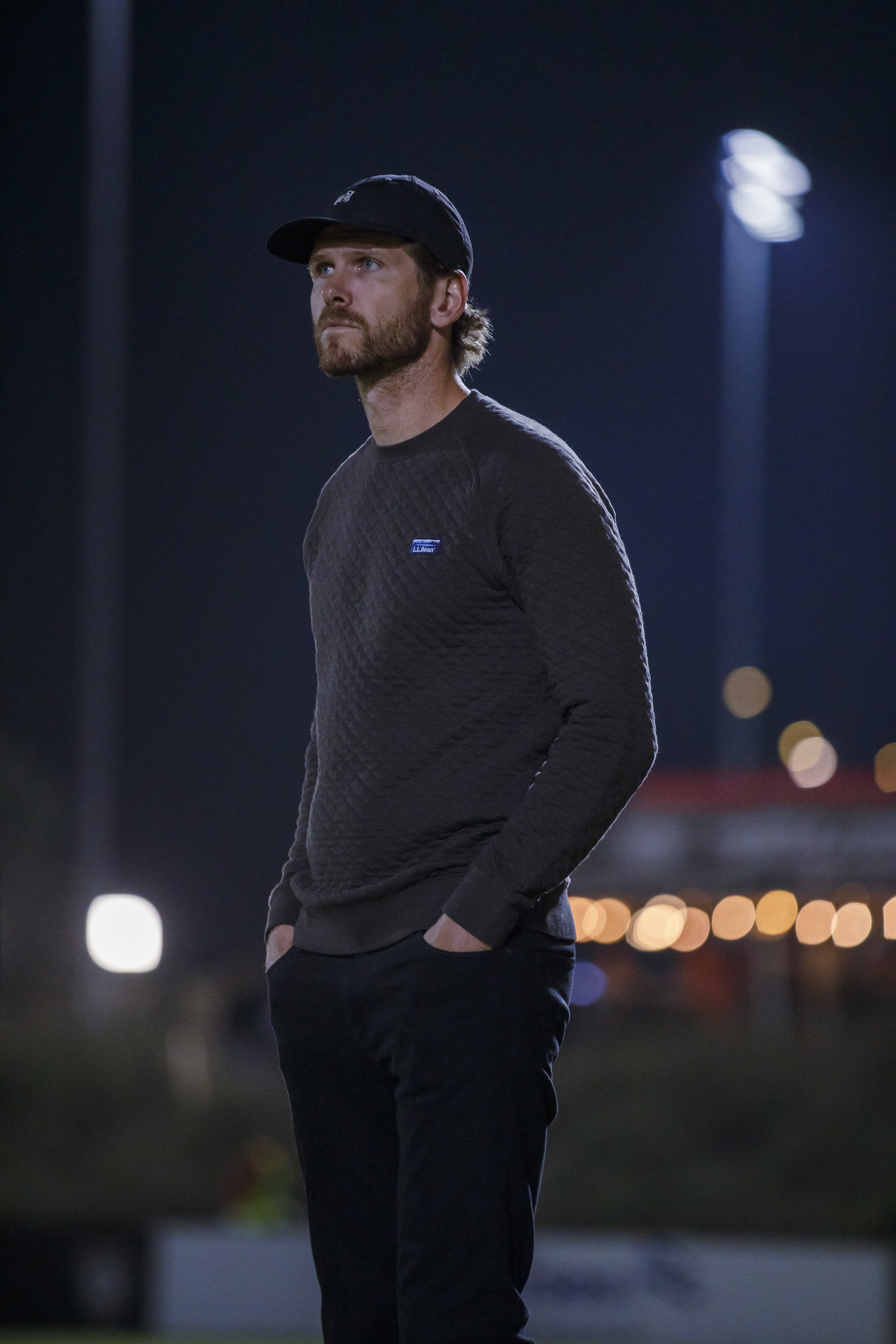

Personal information
- Date of birth: May 11, 1988 (age 38)
- Place of birth: Baltimore, Maryland, United States
- Height: 6 ft 4 in (1.93 m)
- Position: Forward

College career
Years	Team	Apps	(Gls)
2006–2008	Lenoir-Rhyne Bears		
2009	Towson Tigers		

Senior career*
Years	Team	Apps	(Gls)
2007–2008	Hampton Roads Piranhas	13	(4)
2009	Reading Rage	16	(17)
2009	Vancouver Whitecaps	0	(0)
2010	FC Tampa Bay	19	(4)
2011	Fort Lauderdale Strikers	6	(0)
2012	KTP	17	(2)
2013–2014	Philadelphia Union	25	(1)
2013	→ Harrisburg City Islanders (loan)	3	(2)
2014	→ Harrisburg City Islanders (loan)	3	(1)
2015	Wilmington Hammerheads	10	(2)
2016–2017	Harrisburg City Islanders	27	(7)
2022–2023	Colorado Springs Switchbacks	44	(2)
- * Club domestic league appearances and goals as of October 20, 2023

Aaron Wheeler (born May 11, 1988) is an American former professional soccer player who is currently an assistant coach for Hartford Athletic.

== Career ==
=== College and amateur ===
Wheeler attended Patapsco High School in Dundalk, Maryland, who he led to the 2005 Baltimore County championship title, and played three years of college soccer at Lenoir-Rhyne University before transferring to Towson University prior to his senior year. At Lenoir-Rhyne he was a two-time NSCAA All-South Atlantic Region First Team selection and a three-time All-South Atlantic Conference First Team member.

During his college years Wheeler also played for the Hampton Roads Piranhas and Reading Rage in the USL Premier Development League. He was the 2009 PDL Most Valuable Player, and led the league in scoring, recorded a goal or an assist in 13 of 17 regular season and playoffs matches, and finished the 2009 campaign with 17 regular season goals.

=== Professional ===
Following the conclusion of the 2009 PDL season, Wheeler signed with the Vancouver Whitecaps He trained with the first team, and played exhibition games with the Vancouver Whitecaps Residency PDL team, but was never called up to the senior USL First Division squad, and released when his contract expired in October 2009.

Wheeler signed for the FC Tampa Bay in the USSF Division 2 Professional League in early 2010, and made his professional debut on April 16, 2010, in Tampa's first-ever game, a 1–0 victory over Crystal Palace Baltimore. He scored his first professional goal on May 19, 2010, in a 3–3 tie with the Austin Aztex.

He also was one of the trialists for the Philadelphia Union in the 2011 Major League Soccer preseason. He was not offered a contract by the Union, and instead signed with the Fort Lauderdale Strikers of the North American Soccer League, on November 30, 2010. He played just six games with the Strikers before suffering a season-ending injury. Wheeler was released at the end of the 2011 season.

He signed with FC KooTeePee of the Finnish Ykkönen in March 2012. In January 2013, Wheeler signed with Philadelphia Union in Major League Soccer.

On June 8, 2022, after nearly five years after playing his last professional game, Wheeler signed with USL Championship side Colorado Springs Switchbacks.

In addition to playing professionally, in his spare time, Wheeler coaches soccer to aspiring players in Maryland.

== Career statistics ==
=== Club ===
Club performance			League		Cup		League Cup		Continental		Total	
Season	Club	League	Apps	Goals	Apps	Goals	Apps	Goals	Apps	Goals	Apps	Goals
Canada			League		Canadian Championship		League Cup		North America		Total	
2009	Vancouver Whitecaps	USL First Division	0	0	0	0	0	0	0	0	0	0
USA			League		Open Cup		League Cup		North America		Total	
2010	FC Tampa Bay	USSF Division 2	19	4	0	0	0	0	0	0	19	4
2011	Fort Lauderdale Strikers	NASL	6	0	0	0	0	0	0	0	6	0
Finland			League		Suomen Cup		League Cup		Europe		Total	
2012	KooTeePee	Ykkönen	17	2	2	3	0	0	0	0	19	5
USA			League		Open Cup		League Cup		North America		Total	
2013	Philadelphia Union	Major League Soccer	5	1	0	0	0	0	0	0	5	1
2013	Harrisburg City Islanders	USL Pro	3	2	0	0	0	0	0	0	3	2
Total	Canada		0	0	0	0	0	0	0	0	0	0
Total	USA		33	7	0	0	0	0	0	0	33	7
Total	Finland		17	2	2	3	0	0	0	0	19	5
Career total			50	9	2	3	0	0	0	0	52	12
