= Hosman Ramos =

American soccer player

Personal information
- Date of birth: August 26, 1989 (age 37)
- Place of birth: Miami, Florida, United States
- Height: 1.70 m (5 ft 7 in)
- Position: Midfielder

Team information
- Current team: Puerto Rico Bayamón
- Number: 2

Youth career
- 2007–2008: Miami FC
- 2008–2009: San Jacinto College
- 2010: Mercer County Community College
- 2011–2012: Blue Star Honduras

Senior career*
Years	Team	Apps	(Gls)
2012–2013	Fort Lauderdale Strikers	20	(0)
2014–	Puerto Rico Bayamón	7	(2)
- * Club domestic league appearances and goals as of January 24, 2015

Hosman Ramos (born August 26, 1989) is an American soccer player who plays as a midfielder for the National Premier Soccer League club Puerto Rico Bayamón.

== Early life ==
Ramos spent six years in the Kendal Program, two of which were with Miami FC Academy. In 2008 Ramos attended San Jacinto College in Houston, Texas where he played soccer as well from 2008 to 2009. In 2009 Ramos moved to Mercer County Community College in Mercer County, New Jersey. In 2011 Ramos moved to Blue Star Hounders where he started his semi-pro career during the Copa Latina. In 2011 Ramos and Blue Star finished as runner-up in the Copa Latina. He then helped Blue Star win the Copa Latina one year later in 2012.

== Career ==
=== Fort Lauderdale Strikers ===
On March 27, 2012, Ramos signed a professional contract with Fort Lauderdale Strikers of the North American Soccer League along with Lionel Brown and Darnell King. Ramos was still playing for Blue Star while in pre-season with the Strikers. Ramos made his professional debut against the Atlanta Silverbacks in the NASL on May 26, 2012, coming on as a 65th-minute substitute.

=== Puerto Rico Bayamón ===
In 2014 Ramos signed a contract with Puerto Rico Bayamón. Ramos will be playing in the Concacaf Champions League.

== Career statistics ==
Statistics accurate as of March 29, 2013

Club	Season	League			Cup			Playoffs			Total		
Club	Season	Apps	Goals	Assists	Apps	Goals	Assists	Apps	Goals	Assists	Apps	Goals	Assists
Fort Lauderdale Strikers	2012	12	0	0	0	0	0	1	0	0	13	0	0
Fort Lauderdale Strikers	2013	0	0	0	0	0	0	—	—	—	0	0	0
Career total		12	0	0	0	0	0	1	0	0	13	0	0
