= Yoximar Granado =

Colombian footballer (born 1992)

Personal information
- Full name: Yoximar Granados Mosquera
- Date of birth: March 31, 1992 (age 34)
- Place of birth: Cali, Colombia
- Height: 5 ft 7 in (1.70 m)
- Position: Midfielder

Team information
- Current team: Llaneros

Youth career
- 2000–2009: Carlos Sarmiento Lora
- 2010: Quilmes

Senior career*
Years	Team	Apps	(Gls)
2011–2012	Fort Lauderdale Strikers	20	(1)
2014	Puerto Rico Bayamón	0	(0)
2015–	Llaneros	2	(0)
- * Club domestic league appearances and goals as of June 4, 2011

Yoximar Granados Mosquera (born March 31, 1992) is a Colombian professional footballer for the Categoría Primera B club Llaneros.

== Career ==
Granado is a product CDEF Carlos Sarmiento Lora, and spent time training with Argentine First Division side Quilmes in 2010 as a youth.

After trialing with Major League Soccer's Chicago Fire in the spring of 2011 Granado signed with the Fort Lauderdale Strikers in the North American Soccer League on April 14, 2011.

He made his debut for Fort Lauderdale the very next day, on April 15, as a late substitute in a game against the NSC Minnesota Stars.
