= Nicolas Platter =

American soccer player (born 1981)

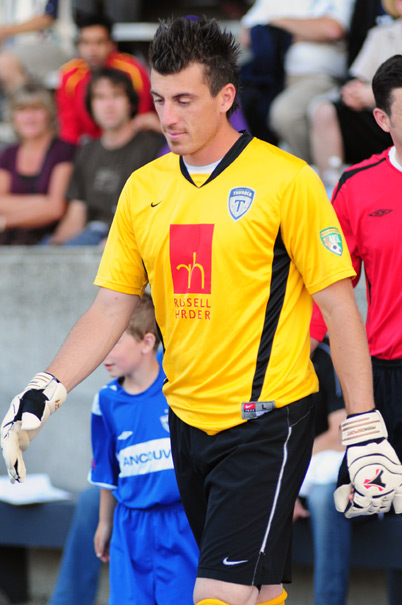

Personal information
- Date of birth: November 22, 1981 (age 44)
- Place of birth: Los Angeles, California, U.S.
- Height: 6 ft 1 in (1.85 m)
- Position: Goalkeeper

College career
Years	Team	Apps	(Gls)
2000–2004	UC Davis Aggies		

Senior career*
Years	Team	Apps	(Gls)
2004	Sacramento Knights		
2005–2009	Minnesota Thunder	85	(0)
2010	Carolina RailHawks	10	(0)
2011	Fort Lauderdale Strikers	8	(0)
2012	Carolina RailHawks	0	(0)
2014	Carolina RailHawks	0	(0)

Managerial career
- North Carolina FC (goalk. coach)
- * Club domestic league appearances and goals as of April 11, 2014

Nicolas Platter (born November 22, 1981) is an American soccer player who currently is the goalkeeper coach for North Carolina FC.

== Career ==
=== College ===
Platter played college soccer at the University of California, Davis, where is generally considered to be one of the most successful goalkeepers in UC Davis history. He finished his career at UC Davis as the all-time shutout leader with 17, and as the career saves leader with 195. He was also his team's captain since 2003. He also played one season with the Sacramento Knights in the National Premier Soccer League.

=== Professional ===
Platter signed with Minnesota Thunder in 2005, and was used primarily a backup to first-choice keeper Joe Warren, playing in just six first team games in his first two years with the club. Platter emerged as the starting goalkeeper for the team in 2007, eventually logging 1,620 minutes in 18 games played, and has continued to hold the starting goalkeeper position through 2008 and into 2009.

After five years with Minnesota Thunder Platter signed a two-year contract with Carolina RailHawks in March 2010. However, the RailHawks were dissolved following the 2010 season (only to be reborn with new ownership) and all players' contracts voided.

Platter signed with Fort Lauderdale Strikers of the North American Soccer League on February 24, 2011.

Platter signed as a player and assistant coach for Carolina RailHawks on March 1, 2012.

After spending the 2013 season out of soccer, Platter rejoined the RailHawks for the 2014 season. He was an assistant coach for the RailHawks and did goalkeeping coaching for CASL. He is currently a realtor at LPT Realty in the Triangle Region of North Carolina.
