= Phillip Lamarre =

American soccer player (born 1987)

Personal information
- Full name: Phillip Lamarre
- Date of birth: September 18, 1987 (age 39)
- Place of birth: Plantation, Florida, United States
- Height: 6 ft 2 in (1.88 m)
- Position: Goalkeeper

College career
| Years | Team | Apps | (Gls) |
| 2006–2008 | Florida Atlantic Owls | 55 | (0) |
| 2009 | FIU Golden Panthers | | |

Senior career*
| Years | Team | Apps | (Gls) |
| 2010 | FC Tampa Bay | 0 | (0) |
| 2010 | → Miami FC (loan) | 0 | (0) |
| 2011 | Fort Lauderdale Strikers | 0 | (0) |
- * Club domestic league appearances and goals as of September 22, 2010

Phillip Lamarre (born September 18, 1987, in Plantation, Florida) is an American soccer player currently without a club, having last played with the Fort Lauderdale Strikers of the second division North American Soccer League.

== Career ==
=== Youth and college ===
Lamarre grew up in Margate, Florida, and attended Marjory Stoneman Douglas High School where he was named to South the Florida Sun-Sentinel and Miami Herald All-Area First Team his senior year, was named Miami Herald Player of the Year, was a two-time champion in both the State Cup and Sun Bowl, and was a member of Florida state team for three years.

He played three years college soccer at Florida Atlantic University, starting in 55 games. At FAU he was named to Atlantic Sun Conference All-Tournament team as a freshman, was named to the Atlantic Soccer Conference All-Conference second team and FAU Classic All-Tournament Team as a sophomore, and moved into first on FAU's career charts for most shutouts, goalkeeper minutes, most saves and most wins in his junior season in 2008, before transferring to Florida International University before his senior year.

=== Professional ===
Undrafted out of college, Lamarre signed his first professional contract in 2010 when he was signed by the FC Tampa Bay in the USSF Division 2 Professional League. He was released by the club on February 22, 2011.

On March 30, 2011, Lamarre signed with Fort Lauderdale Strikers of the North American Soccer League. He spent the 2011 season as the third choice goalkeeper. Lamarre left the club at the end of the 2011 season.

=== Coaching ===
Since his retirement, Lamarre has returned to his high school alma mater Marjory Stoneman Douglas High School, where he has spent time coaching the boys varsity soccer team.
