= Patrick Otte =

Dutch footballer (born 1991)

Personal information
- Full name: Patrick Otte
- Date of birth: October 22, 1991 (age 35)
- Place of birth: Hilversum, Netherlands
- Height: 5 ft 8 in (1.73 m)
- Positions: Defender; midfielder

Youth career
- 2007–2008: IMG Academy
- 2008–2010: Middlesbrough

Senior career*
Years	Team	Apps	(Gls)
2011–2012	Fort Lauderdale Strikers	12	(1)
2013	Ventura County Fusion	4	(0)
2016	Jacksonville Armada	9	(0)
- * Club domestic league appearances and goals as of November 23, 2016

Patrick Otte (born October 22, 1991, in Hilversum, Netherlands) is a Dutch footballer.

== Career ==
=== Youth ===
Otte moved with his family to California at a young age and attended IMG Academy for 2 years before joining the academy of storied English side Middlesbrough for 3 years.

=== Professional ===
Otte signed his first professional contract in 2011 when he signed with the Fort Lauderdale Strikers of the North American Soccer League. He made his professional debut on April 9, in a game against FC Edmonton, and scored his first professional goal on May 11 in a 4–2 loss to the Carolina RailHawks. After a promising start to the season, Otte injured his ACL in June and was ruled out for the duration of the season. In December 2011, the Strikers announced that Otte's option had been picked up and he would be returning for a second season with the club.

On April 14, 2012, in a match against the Minnesota Stars, Otte made his first competitive appearance for the Strikers in nearly a year, coming off of the bench for Leopoldo Morales in the 73rd minute.

On February 5, 2013, Otte played for the Leeds United development squad v Wigan Athletic as part of a trial period with the Yorkshire club.

Otte signed with the Jacksonville Armada FC of the North American Soccer League on February 12, 2016, and made his first start for the club in a preseason match against MLS side New York Red Bulls on February 27, 2016.

Otte retired following a series of knee surgeries.

=== Coaching ===
Since retiring, Otte has coached for Calabasas High School, Westlake High School, Oak Park High School in California, and Wasatch Soccer Club in Utah.
