= Daryl Shore =

American former soccer player (born 1970)

Personal information
- Date of birth: January 6, 1970 (age 56)
- Place of birth: Peekskill, New York, U.S.
- Position: Goalkeeper

College career
Years	Team	Apps	(Gls)
1989–1992	Birmingham–Southern Panthers		

Senior career*
Years	Team	Apps	(Gls)
1993–1994	Birmingham Grasshoppers		
1995–1998	New Orleans Riverboat Gamblers		

Managerial career
- 1993–1994: Birmingham–Southern Panthers (assistant)
- 1995–1997: New Orleans Riverboat Gamblers (assistant)
- 1998: New Orleans Storm
- 1999: Lehigh Valley Steam
- 2000–2010: Chicago Fire (assistant)
- 2010–2013: Fort Lauderdale Strikers
- 2014–2017: Real Salt Lake (assistant)
- 2017: Real Salt Lake (interim)
- 2018–2020: Forward Madison
- 2021–2022: Puerto Rico (assistant)
- * Club domestic league appearances and goals

Daryl Shore (born January 6, 1970) is an American former soccer player and coach.

== Player ==
Shore attended Birmingham–Southern College where started on the men's soccer team from 1989 to 1993. He was a two-time NAIA All American and graduated in 1993. He was inducted into the Birmingham-Southern College Athletic Hall of Fame in 1998. In 1994, Shore signed with the Birmingham Grasshoppers of the USISL. In 1994, he was the USISL's Mid-South Goalkeeper of the Year. In 1995, Shore moved to the New Orleans Riverboat Gamblers where he was an assistant coach as well as player. In 1998, he became the head coach of the team, which was now playing in the USL A-League under the name the New Orleans Storm. Shore retired at the end of the season and became a full-time head coach with the expansion Lehigh Valley Steam.

== Coach ==
Shore began his coaching career as an assistant at his alma mater for two years, 1993–1994. Then he became a player/assistant coach in 1995 with the New Orleans Riverboat Gamblers. In 1998, Shore became a full-time head coach with the New Orleans Storm of the USL A-League. In 1999, he moved to the Lehigh Valley Steam. In 2000, the Chicago Fire of Major League Soccer hired Shore as the team's goalkeeper coach. In 2001, he became an assistant coach. In January 2002, he took on more duties with the team as he was named the Director of Youth Development and the assistant coaching director of the Chicago Fire Juniors.

In 2010, he was named head coach of Miami FC in the USSF Division 2 Professional League. In 2011 the team changed its name to Fort Lauderdale Strikers and its affiliation to the North American Soccer League. The club re-signed Shore for the 2011 season on January 26, 2011.

On June 30, 2013, the Strikers announced that Shore had been let go. He has since been signed by Real Salt Lake as goalkeeper coach to work under Jeff Cassar.

On March 20, 2017, Shore was named interim head coach of Real Salt Lake after the dismissal of Jeff Cassar.

On June 26, 2017, Shore was let go from his assistant coach position for Real Salt Lake.

On September 27, 2018, Shore was named the first head coach and technical director of Madison's team in USL League One, later named Forward Madison FC. Shore left Madison following their 2020 season.
