= Aaron Davidson =

American lawyer and businessman

- Born: April 21, 1971 (age 55)
- Education: Emory University (1993); Southern Methodist University (1996)
- Spouse: Michelle Dryjansky

Aaron Davidson (born 1971) is an American lawyer and businessman.

Davidson is a former chairman of the board of governors of the North American Soccer League, and former president of Traffic Sports USA.

Davidson was named VP of sales and marketing of Traffic Group's North American headquarters in 2003. He then became President of Traffic Sports USA in 2012. Davidson spearheaded sponsorship sales for Copa America from 2004–2015 and for CONCACAF from 2012–2015 highlighted by increasing Copa America sponsorship from about $5 million to over $50 million and selling the first overarching CONCACAF partnership to Scotiabank. Davidson also led the reestablishment of the North American Soccer League (NASL) and was part of the founding groups of Pan-American Sports Network – PSN (today Fox Sports Latin America) and the Tour de las Américas (today PGA Tour Latinoamericano).

Davidson was one of 14 suspects indicted and detained in the 2015 FIFA corruption case. He was banned by the FIFA Ethics Committee. In May 2015, Davidson pleaded not guilty in Brooklyn Federal Court and was released on $5 million bond. Subsequently, in October 2016, Davidson pleaded guilty and forfeited $507,900 with sentencing set for October 3, 2019. In September 2018, FIFA's ethics committee imposed life ban on Davidson for bribery and corruption and a $1.03 million fine.

On September 1, 2023, Judge Pamela Chen of the Eastern District of New York acquitted Full Play and Lopez and stayed all upcoming sentencings including Davidson's sentencing in this case until appellate review, if any, is concluded.

== Early life ==
Both of his parents are first generation immigrants, and their parents are of eastern European Jewish ancestry. He describes himself as a "Tex-Mex-Costa Rican Jew".

Davidson was educated at Emory University and the Dedman School of Law at Southern Methodist University.

== Career ==
Davidson is a licensed attorney in Texas and New York. His career has been entirely in the legal and commercial aspects of sports management. Davidson worked at the Muller Group, a marketing firm for sports in New York.
