= Traffic Sports USA =

Association football management company

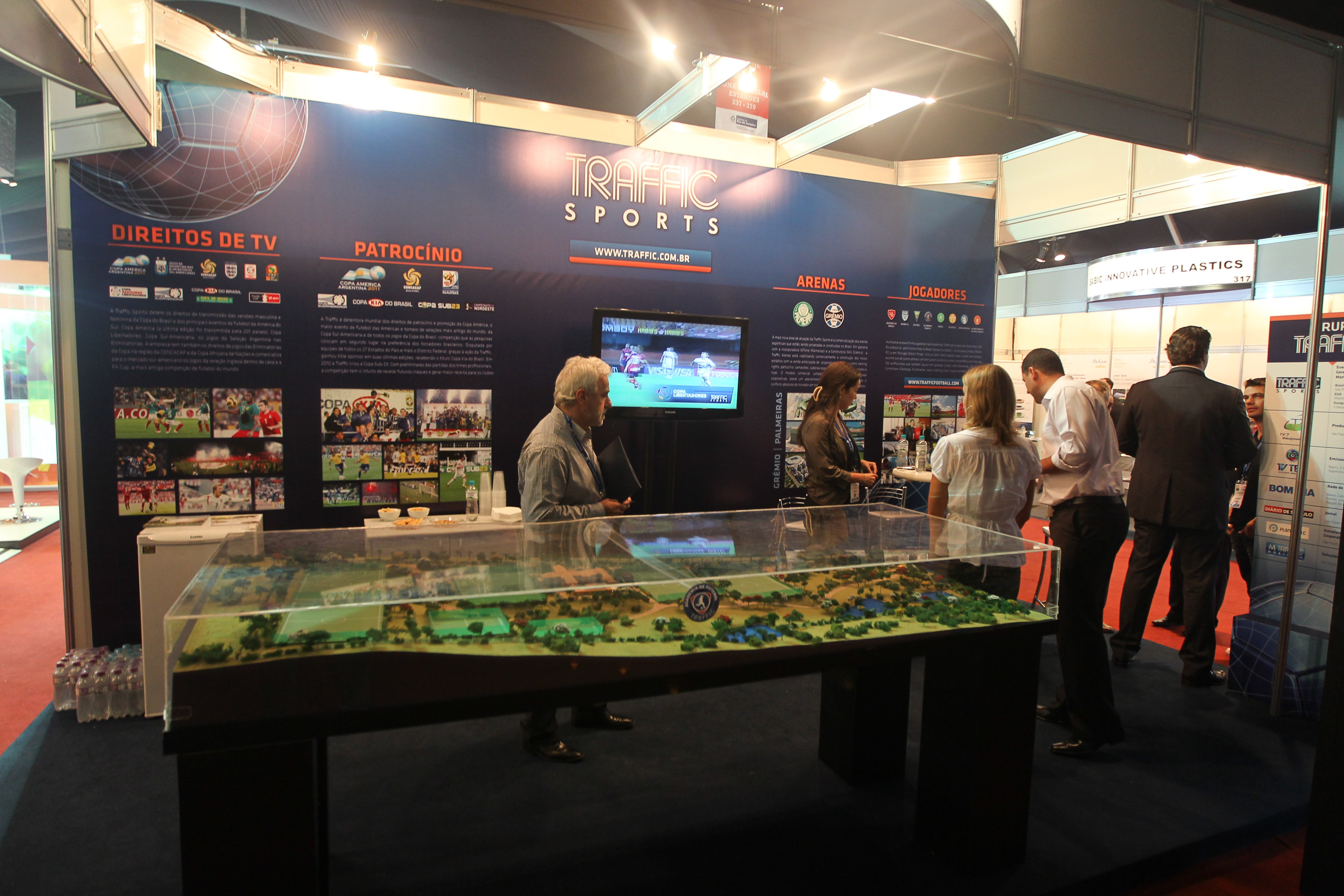
Traffic Sports Stand at Soccerex, 2010

Traffic Sports USA, based in Miami, is a soccer event management company in the North American, Central American and Caribbean region.

== Operation ==
A division of Traffic Group, Traffic Sports USA has been responsible for organizing and/or commercializing many of the international soccer events in the region including the vast majority of CONCACAF’s FIFA World Cup Qualifying matches, five of the last six CONCACAF Gold Cups, the CONCACAF Champions Cup, the Under-17 CONCACAF Regional Championship, the Central American UNCAF Nations Cup, the Central American UNCAF Club Champions Cup, and hundreds of friendly matches. Formerly known as Inter Forever Sports, Traffic Sports USA was established over 15 years ago.

Traffic Sports of Brazil were awarded the commercial partnership rights to the 2013 CONCACAF Gold Cup and the 2013, 2014 and 2015 CONCACAF Champions League tournaments.

== Bribery scandal ==
Traffic Sports was identified in the 2015 FIFA corruption case for allegations related to bribery in the awarding of commercial and marketing rights going back to 1991. Aaron Davidson, President of Traffic Sports USA, was indicted on May 27, 2015 on multiple counts including bribery and money laundering. Traffic Sports USA has pleaded guilty in this case.
