= Fort Lauderdale Strikers (2006–2016) =

- Full name: Fort Lauderdale Strikers
- Nickname: Strikers
- Founded: 2006; 20 years ago
- Dissolved: 2016; 10 years ago
- Owner: Bill Edwards
- League: North American Soccer League
- Website: strikers.com
Home colors	Away colors

The Fort Lauderdale Strikers were an American professional soccer team based in Fort Lauderdale, Florida founded in 2006, that last played in the North American Soccer League (NASL), the second tier of the American soccer pyramid in 2016. The majority of their home games were played in Lockhart Stadium. The Strikers were named after the original Strikers, who played in the old North American Soccer League from 1977 to 1983.

The team was known as Miami FC from 2006 until 2011 before re-branding as the Strikers in 2011. They had an in-state rivalry with the Tampa Bay Rowdies.

== History ==
=== 1977–1997: Fort Lauderdale Strikers legacy ===
The original Fort Lauderdale Strikers were founded in 1977 when the Robbie family relocated the Miami Toros north to Fort Lauderdale and rebranded the team. The team competed in the old North American Soccer League and played its home matches at Lockhart Stadium. Between 1977 and 1983, the Strikers fielded some the world's best players including Gerd Müller, Teófilo Cubillas, Elías Figueroa, George Best and Gordon Banks. The team was captained by Ray Hudson, who led the Strikers to the playoffs in each of their seven seasons in Fort Lauderdale. In 1984, the Strikers relocated to Minneapolis as the Minnesota Strikers.

Following the Strikers departure to Minnesota, former Striker Ronnie Sharp launched the Fort Lauderdale Sun of the newly formed United Soccer League in 1984. The team featured numerous former Strikers. In 1988, the Fort Lauderdale Strikers returned to professional soccer as part of the American Soccer League. During this period the Strikers enjoyed great success, including a national championship in the 1989 season, the only major trophy the Strikers have won. In 1991, the team merged with the Orlando Lions.

In 1994, another team began play in the United States Interregional Soccer League as the Fort Lauderdale Kicks. The next year, with the folding of the American Professional Soccer League Strikers, the Kicks took the name Fort Lauderdale Strikers for themselves. This only lasted one year as the team changed names again, becoming the Florida Strikers before the 1996 season. The team folded in 1997.

=== 2006–2010: Miami FC ===
After Major League Soccer side Miami Fusion were folded in 2001, professional soccer returned to South Florida in the form of a United Soccer Leagues team in 2006 when Traffic Sports USA founded Miami FC. The club made headlines when former World Cup winners Romario and Zinho signed for the team.

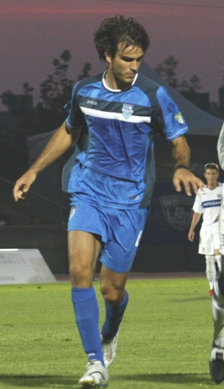
Cristiano Dias played almost 100 games for Miami FC

In 2007, the team held a contest through public schools in the greater Miami-Dade area for a nickname and mascot. Shia Moreno, an elementary school student won for her nickname "Blues". Daniel Townsend, a senior at Robert Morgan Educational Center won for his mascot creation "Hotshot", a flaming Sonic-the-Hedgehog-like character.

In 2009, the team moved to Fort Lauderdale to play out of Lockhart Stadium. In summer 2010, Miami FC announced its intention to 'pay homage' to the Fort Lauderdale Strikers of the former NASL by incorporating 'Strikers' into the team name from 2011. They rebranded themselves the Fort Lauderdale Strikers on February 17, 2011, and joined the newly established North American Soccer League.

=== 2011–2016: Return of the Fort Lauderdale Strikers ===
Tim Robbie, son of original Strikers owner Joe Robbie, was named president of the Strikers ahead of the inaugural season. In their first season as the Fort Lauderdale Strikers, the club reached the 2011 NASL Championship Series, losing 3–1 on aggregate to the NSC Minnesota Stars (now Minnesota United FC).

In his second full season in charge, head coach Daryl Shore led the Strikers to the playoffs the following season. After a fifth place regular season finish in 2012, the Strikers were bounced from the first round of postseason action by Carolina RailHawks.

Ahead of the 2013 season, the Strikers named Tom Mulroy president of the club. Following a 2–2–7 record, coach Shore was let go by the club before the final match of the 2013 Spring Season. His replacement was Austrian Günter Kronsteiner, who led the club to a fifth-place finish in the Fall Season with a 5–3–6 record.

2014 was a momentous year in the history of the Strikers. A new ownership group was announced on September 19, 2014. On the field, Kronsteiner took the Strikers to a place in the NASL Championship, finishing runner-up to the San Antonio Scorpions.

The club made global headlines announcing that Brazil soccer icon Ronaldo had joined the ownership of the club on December 11, 2014. In a press release, Ronaldo was quoted as saying, "I will be very involved with the management of the team and have already started to make introductions that will certainly help us to turn the Strikers into a global powerhouse." It was announced on January 15, 2015, that, if he could get fit, Ronaldo would begin playing for the Strikers.

On September 22, 2016 ESPN FC reported that "The Fort Lauderdale Strikers are in serious financial jeopardy, while the future of the entire National American Soccer League is also in doubt, according to reports." As reported by WRAL in Raleigh, North Carolina, and confirmed by Sun-Sentinel and the Miami Herald, Strikers principal owner Paulo Cesso stopped funding the team on September 1.

On January 6, 2017, the NASL announced that the 2017 season would move forward with eight teams. Fort Lauderdale was not one of the teams listed.

=== 2017: Summary judgement and public sale ===
In November 2016, Tampa Bay Rowdies owner, Bill Edwards, filed a complaint against the Strikers' holding company, Miami FC, LLC, over money loaned to the struggling club. Edwards claimed that the team had failed to pay him back $300,000 in loans. He sought damages and foreclosure on the Strikers’ assets in the lawsuit. A signed promissory note showed that the collateral they put up to secure the loans included the team's patents, copyrights, trademarks, rights to use of the name "Ft Lauderdale Strikers" along with other tangible assets.

In May 2017 Edwards was awarded a summary judgement in the case, and after a June 20 public sale, gained control of the copyrights, trademarks and any rights to the use of the name "Fort Lauderdale Strikers" or any variation for $5,100. He has yet to announce what he plans to do with Strikers brand in the future. Since then, a new and unrelated team based in Ft. Lauderdale, Inter Miami CF II, has begun operations as the reserve team of Major League Soccer club Inter Miami CF.

A "version" of the Strikers made a return for the The Soccer Tournament 2026.

== Colors and badge ==
The official colors of the Strikers are red, gold, charcoal gray, metallic gold and "beach sand". According to a press release issued just prior to the beginning of the 2011 season, the color palette is intended to "connecting with the heart and passion of the players and fans of the beautiful game while symbolizing the warmth of the Sunshine State and City of Fort Lauderdale." The team's shirts, which feature red and gold hoops paired with black shorts, intentionally mirror those worn by the old NASL Strikers in the 1980s.

According to the same press release, the logo incorporates "a contemporary seven-pointed sun with ball signifying the golden era of the Fort Lauderdale Strikers from 1977 to 1983", has a "distinctive tie to the City of Fort Lauderdale's landmark wave wall columns of Las Olas Boulevard that bookend the memorable Strikers jersey hoops", and features a unique script and typeface.

The old Miami FC colors were tropical blue, gold and white, and its logo was a simple shield featuring a stylized soccer ball, the Miami FC wordmark, and shading in the team's color palette.

== Venue ==
- Tropical Park Stadium; Olympia Heights, Florida (2006–08)
- Lockhart Stadium; Fort Lauderdale, Florida (2009–2016)
- Central Broward Stadium; Lauderhill, Florida (2016)

The Strikers currently play their home games at Central Broward Stadium in Lauderhill, Florida. Built in 1959 as an athletic facility for local high schools, Lockhart Stadium was the home of the original Fort Lauderdale Strikers of the original North American Soccer League, as well the now-defunct Miami Fusion of Major League Soccer. The Strikers announced in December 2012 that they would like to see Lockhart Stadium renovated, or build their own soccer specific stadium. The Strikers moved to Central Broward Stadium after their lease with Lockhart ended in 2016; the Striker's final game at Lockhart was a 1–0 win over Jacksonville Armada FC on July 30, 2016.

During their five years in the USL, the old Miami FC played at various stadiums in the greater Miami area, including Tropical Park Stadium, Miami Orange Bowl and FIU Stadium.

In a historical note, the Strikers have hosted the first NASL games for FC Edmonton in 2011 and Ottawa Fury FC in 2014. Lockhart Stadium in Fort Lauderdale also hosted the first road game for the Indy Eleven expansion team (after playing their first two matches at home in Indianapolis).

== Club culture ==
The Fort Lauderdale Strikers had strong support among young people in South Florida. The "Club of supporters" was growing in the last years, mainly in some universities of Broward County.

Miami FC used to use cheerleaders from FIU. The Strikers did not have cheerleaders, though the club had an official dance team that performed before games and at halftime.

=== Rivalries ===
The Strikers' main rivalry is with the Tampa Bay Rowdies. The rivalry began in 1977 between the original Fort Lauderdale Strikers and the original Tampa Bay Rowdies of the North American Soccer League, In recent times, the rivalry between both fans and the media has been dubbed the Florida Derby, referencing the two clubs' locations in South Florida. The heart of the rivalry between the two sides exists primarily within the two clubs' supporters groups. Presently, the Fort Lauderdale Strikers are supported by the former "Miami Ultras", whom also supported the Miami Fusion.

=== Coastal Cup ===
The Coastal Cup (est. 2010) originally was contested between the Strikers and Rowdies, but with Jacksonville Armada FC's entry into the league in 2015, the competition has become triangular. In the 2016 season a new Miami FC team joined the NASL. This addition made the Coastal Cup a quadrilateral competition for one season.

=== Supporters group ===
- Flight 19: Based in Fort Lauderdale, the group formed in late 2010/early 2011 in anticipation of the return of the Fort Lauderdale Strikers. It is named after the famous Flight 19 incident where five TBM Avenger aircraft disappeared over the Bermuda Triangle after taking off from NAS Fort Lauderdale (now Fort Lauderdale–Hollywood International Airport) in 1945.

== Players and staff ==
=== Notable former players ===
This list of former players includes those who received international caps while playing for the team, made significant contributions to the team in terms of appearances or goals while playing for the team, or who made significant contributions to the sport either before they played for the team, or after they left. It is clearly not yet complete and all inclusive, and additions and refinements will continue to be made over time.

Fort Lauderdale Strikers

- (Argentina) Eduardo Coudet (2011)
- (Brazil) Léo Moura (2015)
- (Brazil) Pecka (2011–14)
- (Costa Rica) Andy Herron (2012–13)
- (El Salvador) Gerson Mayen (2011)
- (England) Martyn Lancaster (2011)
- (England) Mark Anderson (2012–14)
- (Finland) Toni Ståhl (2011–13)
- (Germany) Marius Ebbers (2014)
- (Jamaica) Lance Laing (2011–12)
- (Jamaica) Shavar Thomas (2013)
- (North Macedonia) Oka Nikolov (2014)
- (United States) Bryan Arguez (2011)
- (United States) Matt Glaeser (2010–13)
- (United States) Darnell King (2012–14)
- (United States) Fafà Picault (2014)
- (United States) Walter Restrepo (2011–13)
- (United States) Brian Shriver (2011)
- (United States) Abe Thompson (2011–12)

Miami FC

- (Brazil) Diego
- (Brazil) Romário
- (Brazil) Zinho
- (Brazil) Cristiano
- (Brazil) Alex Afonso
- (Brazil) Júnior Baiano
- (Brazil) Leo Inacio
- (Brazil) Paulo Jr.
- (Colombia) John Pulido
- (Colombia) Diego Serna
- (Guatemala) Mario Rafael Rodríguez
- (Guyana) Sean Cameron
- (Guyana) John Paul Rodrigues
- (Honduras) Walter Ramírez
- (Jamaica) Sean Fraser
- (Puerto Rico) Josh Saunders
- (Trinidad and Tobago) Avery John
- (United States) Eric Brunner
- (United States) Jarryd Goldberg
- (United States) Luchi Gonzalez

=== Head coaches ===
Miami FC

- (Brazil) Chiquinho de Assis (2006–07)
- (Brazil) Zinho (2008–09)
- (Nicaragua) Victor Pastora (2010)
- (United States) Daryl Shore (2010)

Fort Lauderdale Strikers

Head coach	Interim head coach	Period	G	W	T	L	Win %	Honors/notes
(United States) Daryl Shore		2011–13	77	25	23	29	32.47	Longest-tenured coach in modern Strikers history. Led the club to the 2011 NASL Championship Series.
	(Brazil) Ricardo Lopes	2013	1	0	0	1	0.00	
(Austria) Günter Kronsteiner		2013–14	43	16	11	16	37.21	Led the club to the 2014 NASL Championship Final and first Coastal Cup.
(Argentina) Marcelo Neveleff		2015	9	2	2	5	20.00	
	(Honduras) Iván Guerrero	2015	1	1	0	0	100.00	
(Austria) Günter Kronsteiner		2015	20	8	8	6	40.00	best win percentage in modern Strikers history
(Brazil) Caio Zanardi		2016	36	12	10	14	33.33	

== Achievements ==
=== Club ===
NASL Championship

- Runner-up: 2011; 2014

Coastal Cup

- Winners: 2014, 2015

Ponce De Leon Cup

- Winners: 2008

=== Individual ===
Golden Boot Award

- 2015: Stefano Pinho

NASL Best XI

- 2011: Lance Laing, Toni Ståhl
- 2012: Mark Anderson, Walter Restrepo
- 2014: Darnell King, Fafà Picault
- 2015: James Marcelin, Stefano Pinho

== Record ==
=== Year-by-year ===
Year	Division	League	Reg. season	Playoffs	Open Cup	Avg. attendance
**Miami FC**
2006	2	USL First Division	5th	Quarter-finals	2nd round	2,074
2007	2	USL First Division	9th	did not qualify	1st round	916
2008	2	USL First Division	9th	did not qualify	3rd round	1,701
2009	2	USL First Division	9th	did not qualify	2nd round	1,063
2010	2	USSF Division 2	4th	did not qualify	3rd round	1,254
**Fort Lauderdale Strikers**
2011	2	NASL	4th	Runner-up	did not participate	3,985
2012	2	NASL	5th	Quarter-finals	3rd round	3,615
2013	2	NASL	Spring: 7th Fall: 5th	did not qualify	3rd round	4,265
2014	2	NASL	Spring: 5th Fall: 4th	Runner-up	3rd Round	3,825
2015	2	NASL	Spring: 8th Fall: 4th	Semi-finals	3rd Round	4,471
2016	2	NASL	Spring: 6th Fall: 6th	did not qualify	Quarter-finals	1,331

=== Most appearances ===
#	Pos.	Name	Nation	Career	NASL	Playoffs	US Open Cup	Total
1	Midfielder	Darnell King	United States	2012–2014	73	3	4	80
2	Defender	**Iván Guerrero**	Honduras	2013–	70	2	2	74
3	Defender	Toni Ståhl	Finland	2011–13	64	6	3	73
4	Midfielder	Wellington Paeckhart	Brazil	2011–2014	62	6	4	72
5	Goalkeeper	Matt Glaeser	United States	2011–13	61	6	3	70
6	Midfielder	Martín Núñez	Uruguay	2011, 2013–2014	61	7	1	69
7	Midfielder	Mark Anderson	England	2012–2014	62	3	3	68
8	Midfielder	Walter Restrepo	United States	2011–13	47	5	4	56
9	Forward	Aly Hassan	United States	2012–15	47	3	2	52
10	Midfielder	**Shawn Chin**	United States	2014–2015	47	2	2	51

Last updated: October 19, 2015.
Bolded players are currently on the Fort Lauderdale Strikers roster.
List only includes stats from 2011 to present

=== Top goal scorers ===
#	Pos.	Name	Nation	Career	NASL	Playoffs	US Open Cup	Total
1	Midfielder	Mark Anderson	England	2012–2014	19	0	3	22
2	Midfielder	Martín Núñez	Uruguay	2011, 2013–2014	14	2	0	16
2	Forward	Stefano Pinho	Brazil	2015–2016	16	0	0	16
4	Forward	Abe Thompson	United States	2011–2012	8	4	0	12
4	Forward	Fafà Picault	United States	2014	12	0	0	12
6	Midfielder	Walter Restrepo	United States	2011–2013	9	1	1	11
6	Forward	Aly Hassan	United States	2012–2015	8	0	3	11
6	Forward	Brian Shriver	United States	2011	6	5	0	11
9	Forward	Andy Herron	Costa Rica	2012–2013	8	0	0	8
10	Midfielder	Marlon Freitas	Brazil	2015	7	0	0	7

Last updated: October 20, 2015.
Bolded players are currently on the Fort Lauderdale Strikers roster.
List only includes stats from 2011 to present

== See also ==
- Fort Lauderdale Strikers (1977–1983)
- Fort Lauderdale Sun (1984–1985)
- Fort Lauderdale Strikers (1988–1994)
- Florida Strikers (1994–1997)
- Miami Fusion (1997–2001)
