= 2012 FC Edmonton season =

FC Edmonton
2012 season
- Owners: Dave Fath; Tom Fath
- Head Coach: Harry Sinkgraven
- NASL: 8th
- Canadian Championship: Semifinals
- Top goalscorer: Shaun Saiko (7 goals)
- Highest home attendance: 2,777 (2 May v. Vancouver)
- Lowest home attendance: 1,120 (6 May v. Carolina)
- Average home league attendance: League: 1,492; All: 1,577
| Home colours | Away colours |

The 2012 FC Edmonton season was the club's second official season of existence, the club's third season altogether. For the 2012 season, Edmonton played in the North American Soccer League, which serves as the second tier to both the American and Canadian soccer pyramids. Outside of the NASL, Edmonton also participated in the 2012 edition of the Canadian Championship for a berth into the 2012–13 CONCACAF Champions League.

== Competitions ==
=== Regular season ===
==== Standings ====
| Pos | Team | Pld | W | D | L | GF | GA | GD | Pts | Qualification |
|---|---|---|---|---|---|---|---|---|---|---|
| 4 | Carolina RailHawks | 28 | 10 | 10 | 8 | 44 | 46 | −2 | 40 | Playoff quarterfinals |
| 5 | Fort Lauderdale Strikers | 28 | 9 | 9 | 10 | 40 | 46 | −6 | 36 | Playoff quarterfinals |
| 6 | Minnesota United | 28 | 8 | 11 | 9 | 34 | 33 | +1 | 35 | Playoff quarterfinals |
| 7 | Atlanta Silverbacks | 28 | 7 | 9 | 12 | 35 | 46 | −11 | 30 | |
| 8 | FC Edmonton | 28 | 5 | 10 | 13 | 26 | 36 | −10 | 25 | |

Source: NASL Standings
Rules for classification: 1) points; 2) goal difference; 3) number of goals scored.

=== Preseason ===
| 10 March 2012 | FC Tucson | 1–1 | FC Edmonton | Casa Grande, AZ |
| | Donny Toia 10' | FCE Report; FCT Report | OG 70' |

| 11 March 2012 | New Mexico Lobos | 0–0 | FC Edmonton | Casa Grande, AZ |
| | | FCE Report | | Stadium: Grande Sports Complex |

| 13 March 2012 | New Mexico Lobos | 1–3 | FC Edmonton | Casa Grande, AZ |
| | 23 16' | | Matt Lam 14'; Paul Craig 25'; Ilja van Leerdam 62' | Stadium: Grande Sports Complex |

| 17 March 2012 | VMSL All-Stars | 1–3 | FC Edmonton | Burnaby, BC |
| | | FCE Report | | Stadium: Simon Fraser University |

| 24 March 2012 | WSA Winnipeg | 0–7 | FC Edmonton | Winnipeg, MB |
| | | | | Stadium: Winnipeg Indoor Soccer Complex |

| 25 March 2012 | WSA Winnipeg | 1–3 | FC Edmonton | Winnipeg, MB |
| | Moses Danto 27' | FCE Report; WSA Winnipeg Report | 20' (o.g.) Jordan Smith; 22' Alex Semenets; 31' Serisay Barthélémy | Stadium: Winnipeg Indoor Soccer Complex |

| 2 April 2012 | Minnesota Stars FC | 2–0 | FC Edmonton | Blaine, MN |
| | Simone Bracalello 35'; Devin Deldo 87' | | | Stadium: National Sports Center |

=== North American Soccer League regular season ===
| 7 April 2012 | Fort Lauderdale Strikers | 1 – 0 | FC Edmonton | Fort Lauderdale, FL |
| 7:30 pm EDT | Hassan (red card) 40'; Herron 61' | Match Recap | Lassonde (yellow card) 19'; Kooy (yellow card) 26' van Leerdam (yellow card) 90' | Stadium: Lockhart Stadium; Attendance: 4,779; Referee: Ted Unkel |

| 14 April 2012 | Tampa Bay Rowdies | 1 – 0 | FC Edmonton | St. Petersburg, FL |
| 7:30 pm EDT | Yamada 26'; Hill (yellow card) 82' | Match Recap | Joseph-Augustin (yellow card) 26'; Oppong (yellow card) 67' van Leerdam (yellow card) 78'; Hatchi (yellow card) 84' | Stadium: Al Lang Stadium; Attendance: 3,129; Referee: Fotis Bazakos |

| 18 April 2012 | Puerto Rico Islanders | 0 – 0 | FC Edmonton | Bayamón, PR |
| 7:30 pm EDT | Foley (yellow card) 37'; Fana (yellow card) 60' | Match Recap | Caceros (yellow card) 33'; Saiko (yellow card) 66'; Hatchi (yellow card) 90' | Stadium: Juan Ramón Loubriel Stadium; Attendance: 520 |

| 22 April 2012 | FC Edmonton | 3 – 4 | Minnesota Stars FC | Edmonton, AB |
| 4:05 pm EDT | Saiko (Pinto) 5'; Hatchi (red card) 7'; Hamilton (Saiko) 52'; Porter (Pinto) 64'; Rago (yellow card) 84' | Match Recap | Hlavaty 8' (pen.); Altman 17'; Altman (red card) 29'; Takada (Walker) 68'; Del Do (Kallman) 90+2' | Stadium: Clarke Stadium; Attendance: 1,273; Referee: Justin Tasev |

| 6 May 2012 | FC Edmonton | 3 – 0 | Carolina Railhawks | Edmonton, AB |
| 4:05 pm EDT | Saiko (Lam) 55'; Lam (yellow card) 57'; Saiko (van Leerdam) 59'; Saiko 82' (pen.) | Match Recap | Krause (yellow card) 40'; Nurse (yellow card) 81' | Stadium: Clarke Stadium; Attendance: 1,120; Referee: David Barrie |

| 12 May 2012 | Atlanta Silverbacks | 0 – 2 | FC Edmonton | Atlanta, GA |
| 7:30 pm EDT | Turcios (yellow card) 18'; Navia (yellow card) 26'; Moroney (red card) 58'; Santamaria (yellow card) 85' | Match Recap | Hatchi (yellow card) 11'; Cox (van Leerdam) 14'; Cox (yellow card) 77' van Leerdam (Craig) 88' | Stadium: Atlanta Silverbacks Park; Attendance: 4,743; Referee: Kari Seitz |

| 19 May 2012 | San Antonio Scorpions | 2 – 0 | FC Edmonton | San Antonio, TX |
| 8:30 pm EDT | Greenfield 40'; Harmse (yellow card) 61'; Cochrane (Greenfield) 75' | Match Recap | | Stadium: Heroes Stadium; Attendance: 8,310; Referee: Leszek Stalmach |

| 27 May 2012 | FC Edmonton | 2 – 2 | San Antonio Scorpions | Edmonton, AB |
| 4:05 pm EDT | Pinto (Saiko) 37'; Saiko (van Leerdam) 54'; Craig (yellow card) 56' | Match Recap | Kling (yellow card) 56'; Soto (Ramírez) 62'; Greenfield (yellow card) 68'; Pitchkolan (yellow card) 70'; Ramírez (yellow card) 81'; Pitchkolan (Denissen) 83'; Greenfield (yellow card) 89' (red card) | Stadium: Clarke Stadium; Attendance: 1,515; Referee: Sheena Dickson |

| 3 June 2012 | FC Edmonton | 1 – 2 | Atlanta Silverbacks | Edmonton, AB |
| 4:05 pm EDT | Hatchi (yellow card) 6'; Hatchi (Saiko) 52' | Match Recap | O'Brien 30'; Moroney (O'Brien) 40'; Matsushita (yellow card) 72'; Lancaster (red card) 78'; Cox (yellow card) 83' | Stadium: Clarke Stadium; Attendance: 2,521; Referee: Drew Fischer |

| 10 June 2012 | FC Edmonton | 1 – 0 | Fort Lauderdale Strikers | Edmonton, AB |
| 4:05 pm EDT | Rago (red card) 33'; Lam (yellow card) 63'; Cox (Saiko) 66'; Caceros (yellow card) 80'; Parker (yellow card) 85'; Saiko (yellow card) 88' | Match Recap | Motagalvan (yellow card) 55' | Stadium: Clarke Stadium; Attendance: 1,496; Referee: Rubinco Smilev |

| 16 June 2012 | Fort Lauderdale Strikers | 1 – 0 | FC Edmonton | Fort Lauderdale, FL |
| 7:30 pm EDT | Herron (Restrepo) 68'; Shanosky (yellow card) 84' | Match Recap | Saiko (yellow card) 49' van Leerdam (yellow card) 64'; Lam (yellow card) 82' | Stadium: Lockhart Stadium; Attendance: 2,663; Referee: Andres Pfefferkorn |

| 23 June 2012 | Carolina RailHawks | 2 – 0 | FC Edmonton | Cary, NC |
| 7:00 pm EDT | Shipalane (yellow card) 7'; Zimmerman (da Luz) 34'; Ortiz (Schilawski) 38'; Stockley (yellow card) 61'; Agbossoumonde (yellow card) 68'; Lowery (yellow card) 76'; Lowery (yellow card) 77' (red card) | Match Recap | Lam (yellow card) 54'; Hamilton (yellow card) 85' van Leerdam (yellow card) 88' | Stadium: WakeMed Soccer Park; Attendance: 3,600; Referee: Daniel Fitzgerald |

| 1 July 2012 | FC Edmonton | 0 – 0 | Puerto Rico Islanders | Edmonton, AB |
| 4:05 pm EDT | van Leerdam (yellow card) 22'; Hatchi (yellow card) 37'; Hatchi (yellow card) 58' (red card); Rago (yellow card) 64' | Match Recap | Addlery (yellow card) 45+1'; Hansen (yellow card) 75' | Stadium: Clarke Stadium; Attendance: 1,474; Referee: Alain Ruch |

| 4 July 2012 | San Antonio Scorpions | 1 – 0 | FC Edmonton | San Antonio, TX |
| 7:00 pm EDT | Wagner (yellow card) 34'; Bayona (Greenfield) 66' | Match Recap | Vorbe (yellow card) 19'; Saiko (yellow card) 60' | Stadium: Heroes Stadium; Attendance: 9,115; Referee: Matt Foerster |

| 7 July 2012 | Puerto Rico Islanders | 1 – 1 | FC Edmonton | Bayamón, PR |
| 7:30 pm EDT | Telesford (yellow card) 25'; Faña (Martinez) 32'; Richardson (yellow card) 54' | Match Recap | Rago (yellow card) 35'; Porter (van Leerdam) 52' | Stadium: Juan Ramón Loubriel Stadium; Attendance: 1,502; Referee: Jesus Lebron |

| 15 July 2012 | FC Edmonton | 0 – 1 | Tampa Bay Rowdies | Edmonton, AB |
| 4:05 pm EDT | Hatchi (yellow card) 36'; Lam (yellow card) 70'; Joseph-Augustin (yellow card) 90+' | Match Recap | Yoshitake (red card) 33'; Mulholland (Ambersley) 89'; Sanfilippo (yellow card) 90+' | Stadium: Clarke Stadium; Attendance: 1,688; Referee: Mathieu Bourdeau |

| 21 July 2012 | Atlanta Silverbacks | 1 – 2 | FC Edmonton | Atlanta, GA |
| 7:30 pm EDT | O'Brien 74' (pen.) | Match Recap | Barthélémy (Saiko) 64'; Pinto 65'; Joseph-Augustin (red card) 72'; Pinto (yellow card) 90' | Stadium: Atlanta Silverbacks Park; Attendance: 4,250; Referee: Kevin Terry |

| 28 July 2012 | Tampa Bay Rowdies | 1 – 0 | FC Edmonton | St. Petersburg, FL |
| 7:30 pm EDT | Antoniuk (Amersley) 44' | Match Recap | Arguez (yellow card) 20'; Barthélémy (yellow card) 33' | Stadium: Progress Energy Park; Attendance: 3,149; Referee: Niko Bratsis |

| 4 August 2012 | FC Edmonton | 1 – 1 | Minnesota Stars FC | Edmonton, AB |
| 9:05 pm EDT | Barthélémy (yellow card) 21'; Tchoupe 88' (own); Hamilton (red card) 90+2' | Match Recap | Nuñez (Kallman) 44' | Stadium: Clarke Stadium; Attendance: 1,536; Referee: Justin Tasev |

| 8 August 2012 | FC Edmonton | 1 – 1 | San Antonio Scorpions | Edmonton, AB |
| 9:05 pm EDT | Pinto (Barthélémy) 45+1'; Rago (yellow card) 88' | Match Recap | Greenfield (Campos) 23'; Knight (yellow card) 43'; Soto (yellow card) 66'; Soto (yellow card) 66' (red card); Pitchkolan (yellow card) 73' | Stadium: Clarke Stadium; Attendance: 1,542; Referee: Sheena Dickson |

| 12 August 2012 | FC Edmonton | 1 – 0 | Puerto Rico Islanders | Edmonton, AB |
| 4:05 pm EDT | Saiko (Caceros) 32'; Pinto (yellow card) 56'; Lam (yellow card) 62' | Match Recap | Nurse (yellow card) 45'; Needham (yellow card) 55' | Stadium: Clarke Stadium; Attendance: 1,229; Referee: Chris Grabas |

| 18 August 2012 | Carolina RailHawks | 3 – 2 | FC Edmonton | Cary, NC |
| 7:00 pm EDT | Zimmerman 30'; Lowery (yellow card) 33'; Schilawski (Palacio) 79'; Stockley (yellow card) 87'; Shipalane (Palacio) 90+1' | Match Recap | Craig 9'; West (yellow card) 59'; Porter 72' | Stadium: WakeMed Soccer Park; Attendance: 3,688; Referee: Elie Aguilar |

| 25 August 2012 | Minnesota Stars FC | 1 – 1 | FC Edmonton | Blaine, MN |
| 8:30 pm EDT | Dias (Walker) 17'; Davis (yellow card) 41'; Venegas (yellow card) 44' | Match Recap | Hamilton (yellow card) 20'; Arguez 75' | Stadium: National Sports Center; Attendance: 2,427 |

| 2 September 2012 | FC Edmonton | 0 – 2 | Atlanta Silverbacks | Edmonton, AB |
| 4:05 pm EDT | | Match Recap | Horth (Barrera) 56'; Horth (Moroney) 61'; Blanco (yellow card) 84' | Stadium: Clarke Stadium; Attendance: 1,475; Referee: David Barrie |

| 8 September 2012 | Minnesota Stars FC | 1 – 1 | FC Edmonton | Blaine, MN |
| 8:30 pm EDT | Walker (Davis) 19' | Match Recap | Cox (yellow card) 33'; Saiko (Arguez) 90+2' | Stadium: National Sports Center; Attendance: 2,365 |

| 12 September 2012 | FC Edmonton | 2 – 2 | Carolina RailHawks | Edmonton, AB |
| 9:05 pm EDT | Porter (Cox) 9'; Porter (Saiko) 49' | Match Recap | Zimmerman (Shipalane) 5'; Garey (yellow card) 31'; Zimmerman 57' | Stadium: Clarke Stadium; Attendance: 1,251; Referee: Alain Ruch |

| 16 September 2012 | FC Edmonton | 0 – 3 | Tampa Bay Rowdies | Edmonton, AB |
| 4:05 pm EDT | Barthélémy (yellow card) 45'; Rago (yellow card) 87' | Match Recap | Antoniuk (Mulholland) 21'; Ambersley (yellow card) 39'; Ambersley (Savage) 43'; Mulholland (Antoniuk) 51' | Stadium: Clarke Stadium; Attendance: 1,376; Referee: Drew Fischer |

| 23 September 2012 | FC Edmonton | 2 – 2 | Fort Lauderdale Strikers | Edmonton, AB |
| 4:05 pm EDT | Gigolaj 90'; Craig 90+3' | Match Recap | Thompson 11'; Hassan (yellow card) 62'; Tetteh (yellow card) 64'; Hassan (Thompson) 78' | Stadium: Clarke Stadium; Attendance: 1,392; Referee: David Gantar |

=== Canadian Championship ===
| May 2, 2012 Semifinals | FC Edmonton | 0 – 2 | Vancouver Whitecaps FC | Edmonton, Alberta |
| 10:00 pm EDT | Saiko (yellow card) 67' van Leerdam (yellow card) 74' | | Hassli (Salgado) 18'; Harris 41'; Harvey (yellow card) 73' | Stadium: Commonwealth Stadium; Attendance: 2,777; Referee: Carol Anne Chenard |

| May 9, 2012 Semifinals | Vancouver Whitecaps FC | 3 – 1 | FC Edmonton | Vancouver, British Columbia |
| 10:00 pm EDT | Thorrington (yellow card) 42'; Le Toux (Chiumiento) 75'; Le Toux (Chiumiento) 88'; Mattocks (Chiumiento) 90+3'; Mattocks (yellow card) 90+3' | | Vorbe (yellow card) 33'; Hamilton (yellow card) 41'; Cox (yellow card) 44'; Kooy (yellow card) 51'; Pinto (Rago) 54' | Stadium: BC Place; Attendance: 15,011; Referee: Geoff Gamble |

== Team information ==
=== Roster ===
As of July 27, 2012.

Note: Flags indicate national team as defined under FIFA eligibility rules; some limited exceptions apply. Players may hold more than one non-FIFA nationality.

| No. | Pos. | Nation | Player |
|---|---|---|---|
| 1 | GK | USA | Lance Parker |
| 2 | DF | SCO | David Proctor |
| 3 | DF | USA | Adam West |
| 4 | MF | FRA | Serisay Barthélémy |
| 5 | DF | FRA | Kevin Hatchi |
| 6 | MF | CAN | Shaun Saiko |
| 7 | FW | CAN | Alex Semenets |
| 8 | MF | NED | Ilja van Leerdam |
| 9 | FW | CAN | Michael Cox |
| 11 | MF | CAN | Matthew Lam |
| 13 | DF | FRA | Jonathan Joseph-Augustin |
| 14 | FW | CAN | Paul Craig |
| 15 | DF | CAN | Dino Gardner |

| No. | Pos. | Nation | Player |
|---|---|---|---|
| 16 | MF | CAN | Kenny Caceros |
| 17 | FW | CAN | Elvir Gigolaj |
| 18 | DF | CAN | Paul Hamilton (vice captain) |
| 19 | MF | CAN | Kyle Porter |
| 20 | MF | CAN | Chris Kooy (captain) |
| 21 | MF | CAN | Dominic Oppong |
| 22 | GK | CAN | David Monsalve |
| 23 | GK | CAN | John Smits |
| 24 | DF | CAN | Antonio Rago |
| 25 | GK | CAN | Michal Misiewicz |
| 27 | DF | HAI | Fabien Vorbe |
| 28 | MF | USA | Bryan Arguez (on loan from Montreal Impact) |
| 29 | FW | CHI | Yashir Pinto (on loan from Colo-Colo) |

=== Staff ===
| Position | Staff |
|---|---|
| General Manager | (United States) Tom Liep |
| Head Coach | (Netherlands) Harry Sinkgraven |
| Assistant Coach | (Netherlands) Hans Schrijver |
| Assistant Coach | (Canada) Jeff Paulus |
| Technical Director | (Canada) Joe Petrone |
| Goalkeeping Coach | (Canada) Tomasz Janas |

Last updated: March 21, 2012
Source: FC Edmonton

=== Reserve Roster ===
The Reserve team played full-time in the Alberta Major Soccer League this season.

Note: Flags indicate national team as defined under FIFA eligibility rules; some limited exceptions apply. Players may hold more than one non-FIFA nationality.

| No. | Pos. | Nation | Player |
|---|---|---|---|
| 1 | GK | CAN | Norbert Janas |
| 2 | DF | CAN | Mallan Roberts |
| 3 | MF | CAN | Mark Kadlubicki |
| 4 | MF | FRA | Allan Zebie |
| 5 | DF | CAN | Andre Duberry |
| 6 | MF | CAN | Zachary Kaiser |
| 7 | FW | CAN | Ajeej Singh Sarkaria |
| 8 | FW | CAN | Ajay Khabra |

| No. | Pos. | Nation | Player |
|---|---|---|---|
| 9 | MF | CAN | Edem Mortotsi |
| 10 | MF | CAN | Hanson Boakai |
| 11 | FW | FRA | Bruno Zebie |
| 12 | DF | BIH | Amir Didic |
| 14 | FW | CAN | Aymar Sigue |
| 15 | DF | CAN | Marko Aleksic |
| 16 | MF | CAN | Julian Sansano |

== Squad statistics ==
=== Players ===
Last updated for match on September 23, 2012.

| No. | Pos | Nat | Player | Total | | North American Soccer League | | Canadian Championship | |
| No. | Pos | Nat | Player | Apps | Goals | Apps | Goals | Apps | Goals |
|---|---|---|---|---|---|---|---|---|---|
| 1 | GK | (United States) USA | Lance Parker | 16 | 0 | 16+0 | 0 | 0+0 | 0 |
| 2 | DF | (Scotland) SCO | David Proctor | 9 | 0 | 8+1 | 0 | 0+0 | 0 |
| 3 | DF | (United States) USA | Adam West | 10 | 0 | 10+0 | 0 | 0+0 | 0 |
| 4 | FW | (France) FRA | Serisay Barthélémy | 21 | 1 | 13+7 | 1 | 1+0 | 0 |
| 5 | DF | (France) FRA | Kevin Hatchi | 23 | 1 | 21+0 | 1 | 2+0 | 0 |
| 6 | MF | (Canada) CAN | Shaun Saiko | 24 | 7 | 20+2 | 7 | 2+0 | 0 |
| 7 | FW | (Canada) CAN | Alex Semenets | 3 | 0 | 0+3 | 0 | 0+0 | 0 |
| 8 | MF | (Netherlands) NED | Ilja van Leerdam | 17 | 1 | 15+0 | 1 | 1+1 | 0 |
| 9 | FW | (Canada) CAN | Michael Cox | 20 | 3 | 10+9 | 3 | 1+0 | 0 |
| 11 | FW | (Canada) CAN | Matt Lam | 21 | 0 | 12+7 | 0 | 1+1 | 0 |
| 13 | DF | (France) FRA | Jonathan Joseph-Augustin | 15 | 0 | 12+2 | 0 | 1+0 | 0 |
| 14 | FW | (Canada) CAN | Paul Craig | 17 | 2 | 8+7 | 2 | 0+2 | 0 |
| 15 | DF | (Canada) CAN | Dino Gardner | 2 | 0 | 0+2 | 0 | 0+0 | 0 |
| 16 | MF | (Canada) CAN | Kenny Caceros | 25 | 0 | 18+6 | 0 | 1+0 | 0 |
| 17 | FW | (Canada) CAN | Elvir Gigolaj | 6 | 1 | 1+5 | 1 | 0+0 | 0 |
| 18 | DF | (Canada) CAN | Paul Hamilton | 25 | 1 | 23+0 | 1 | 2+0 | 0 |
| 19 | FW | (Canada) CAN | Kyle Porter | 26 | 5 | 19+5 | 5 | 1+1 | 0 |
| 20 | MF | (Canada) CAN | Chris Kooy | 25 | 0 | 20+3 | 0 | 1+1 | 0 |
| 21 | MF | (Canada) CAN | Dominic Oppong | 16 | 0 | 9+6 | 0 | 1+0 | 0 |
| 22 | GK | (Canada) CAN | David Monsalve | 3 | 0 | 1+0 | 0 | 2+0 | 0 |
| 23 | GK | (Canada) CAN | John Smits | 7 | 0 | 7+0 | 0 | 0+0 | 0 |
| 24 | DF | (Canada) CAN | Antonio Rago | 25 | 0 | 21+3 | 0 | 1+0 | 0 |
| 25 | GK | (Canada) CAN | Michal Misiewicz | 4 | 0 | 4+0 | 0 | 0+0 | 0 |
| 26 | DF | (Canada) CAN | Fabrice Lassonde | 9 | 0 | 7+1 | 0 | 1+0 | 0 |
| 27 | DF | (Haiti) HAI | Fabien Vorbe | 7 | 0 | 5+1 | 0 | 1+0 | 0 |
| 28 | MF | (United States) USA | Bryan Arguez | 13 | 1 | 13+0 | 1 | 0+0 | 0 |
| 29 | FW | (Chile) CHI | Yashir Pinto | 23 | 4 | 15+6 | 3 | 2+0 | 1 |

=== Disciplinary records ===
Only players with at least one card included.

| Number | Position | Name | NASL Regular Season | | Canadian Championship | | Total | |
| Number | Position | Name | Booked | Sent off (straight red) | Booked | Sent off (straight red) | Booked | Sent off (straight red) |
|---|---|---|---|---|---|---|---|---|
| 1 | GK | Lance Parker | 1 | 0 | 0 | 0 | 1 | 0 |
| 3 | DF | Adam West | 1 | 0 | 0 | 0 | 1 | 0 |
| 4 | FW | Serisay Barthélémy | 3 | 0 | 0 | 0 | 3 | 0 |
| 5 | DF | Kevin Hatchi | 7 | 1 | 0 | 0 | 7 | 1 |
| 6 | MF | Shaun Saiko | 4 | 0 | 1 | 0 | 5 | 0 |
| 8 | MF | Ilja van Leerdam | 5 | 0 | 1 | 0 | 6 | 0 |
| 9 | FW | Michael Cox | 2 | 0 | 1 | 0 | 3 | 0 |
| 11 | FW | Matt Lam | 6 | 0 | 0 | 0 | 6 | 0 |
| 13 | DF | Jonathan Joseph-Augustin | 2 | 1 | 0 | 0 | 2 | 1 |
| 14 | FW | Paul Craig | 1 | 0 | 0 | 0 | 1 | 0 |
| 16 | MF | Kenny Caceros | 2 | 0 | 0 | 0 | 2 | 0 |
| 18 | DF | Paul Hamilton | 2 | 1 | 1 | 0 | 3 | 1 |
| 20 | MF | Chris Kooy | 1 | 0 | 1 | 0 | 2 | 0 |
| 21 | MF | Dominic Oppong | 1 | 0 | 0 | 0 | 1 | 0 |
| 24 | DF | Antonio Rago | 5 | 1 | 0 | 0 | 5 | 1 |
| 26 | DF | Fabrice Lassonde | 1 | 0 | 0 | 0 | 1 | 0 |
| 27 | DF | Fabien Vorbe | 1 | 0 | 1 | 0 | 2 | 0 |
| 28 | MF | Bryan Arguez | 1 | 0 | 0 | 0 | 1 | 0 |
| 29 | FW | Yashir Pinto | 2 | 0 | 0 | 0 | 2 | 0 |
| | | TOTALS | 48 | 4 | 6 | 0 | 54 | 4 |
