= 2013 Minnesota United FC season =

Minnesota United FC
2013 season
- Owner: Bill McGuire
- Head coach: Manny Lagos
- NASL: Spring: Sixth; Fall: Fourth
- U.S. Open Cup: Second Round
- Top goalscorer: League: Pablo Campos (13); All: Pablo Campos (13)
- Highest home attendance: 6,754
- Lowest home attendance: 2,028
Home colors	Away colors

The 2013 season was Minnesota United FC's fourth season of existence and their third consecutive season playing in the North American Soccer League, the second division of the American soccer pyramid.

== Roster ==
As of match played November 2, 2013

No.	Name	Nationality	Position	Date of birth (age)	Signed from	Signed in	Contract ends	Apps.	Goals
Goalkeepers
1	Mitch Hildebrandt	(United States)	GK	12 November 1988 (aged 24)	Oakland Golden Grizzlies	2012		5	0
30	Matt Van Oekel	(United States)	GK	20 September 1986 (aged 27)	Minnesota Thunder	2010		59	0
33	Daryl Sattler	(United States)	GK	5 September 1980 (aged 33)	San Antonio Scorpions	2013		6	0
Defenders
2	Justin Davis	(United States)	DF	6 May 1988 (aged 25)	New Mexico Lobos	2011			
3	Cristiano	(Brazil)	DF	25 May 1986 (aged 27)	Miami	2011			
5	Edi Buro	(Bosnia and Herzegovina)	DF	19 September 1987 (aged 26)	(Bosnia and Herzegovina) Travnik	2012			
6	Kevin Friedland	(United States)	DF	3 October 1981 (aged 32)	Kansas City Wizards	2004			
14	Brian Kallman	(United States)	DF	23 April 1984 (aged 29)	Minnesota Thunder	2010			
19	Luis Heitor-Piffer	(Brazil)	DF	17 November 1988 (aged 24)	Des Moines Menace	2013			
20	Connor Tobin	(United States)	DF	11 February 1987 (aged 26)	Rochester Rhinos	2012			
27	Brent Kallman	(United States)	DF	4 October 1990 (aged 23)	Des Moines Menace	2013		2	0
Midfielders
0	Floyd Franks	(United States)	MF	5 April 1984 (aged 29)	Carolina RailHawks	2013			
4	Aaron Pitchkolan	(United States)	MF	14 March 1983 (aged 30)	San Antonio Scorpions	2013			
8	Michael Reed	(United States)	MF	28 October 1987 (aged 26)	PSC Soccer Academy	2012			
13	Kentaro Takada	(Japan)	MF	13 April 1983 (aged 30)	Rochester Thunder	2010			
15	Sean de Silva	(Trinidad and Tobago)	MF	17 January 1990 (aged 23)	College of Charleston Cougars	2013			
16	Calum Mallace	(Scotland)	MF	10 January 1990 (aged 23)	Loan from Montreal Impact	2013		12	1
17	Omar Daley	(Jamaica)	MF	25 April 1981 (aged 32)	(Scotland) Motherwell	2013		6	3
22	Kevin Venegas	(United States)	MF	29 July 1989 (aged 24)	Fullerton Titans	2010			
23	Miguel Ibarra	(United States)	MF	15 March 1990 (aged 23)	UC Irvine Anteaters	2010		58	6
28	Siniša Ubiparipović	(Bosnia and Herzegovina)	MF	25 August 1983 (aged 30)	Loan from Montreal Impact	2013		7	0
32	Lucas Rodríguez	(Argentina)	MF	8 February 1986 (aged 27)	Kansas City Brass	2010			
Forwards
7	Simone Bracalello	(Italy)	FW	21 October 1985 (aged 28)		2010			
9	Pablo Campos	(Brazil)	FW	29 January 1983 (aged 30)	San Antonio Scorpions	2013		23	13
10	Mike Ambersley	(United States)	FW	14 February 1983 (aged 30)	Tampa Bay Rowdies	2013		13	1
11	Maxwell Griffin	(United States)	FW	17 September 1987 (aged 26)	Orlando City	2013			
21	Travis Wall	(United States)	FW	4 January 1990 (aged 23)	Ohio Wesleyan University	2013			
25	Nate Polak	(United States)	FW	5 September 1989 (aged 24)	Hastings College	2012			
Players who left during the season
10	Etienne Barbara	(Malta)	FW	10 June 1982 (aged 31)	Carolina RailHawks	2013			
16	Kyle Altman	(United States)	DF	31 January 1986 (aged 27)	Minnesota Thunder	2010			
17	Bryan Arguez	(United States)	MF	13 January 1989 (aged 24)	Montreal Impact	2013			
17	Geison Moura	(Brazil)	MF	16 July 1986 (aged 27)	Rockford Rampage	2010			

== Transfers ==
=== In ===
Date	Player	From	Notes	Ref.
January 1, 2013	(United States) Daryl Sattler	San Antonio Scorpions		
January 1, 2013	(United States) Aaron Pitchkolan	San Antonio Scorpions		
January 23, 2013	(Malta) Etienne Barbara	(Canada) Vancouver Whitecaps FC		
March 1, 2013	(United States) Bryan Arguez	(Canada) FC Edmonton		
April 1, 2013	(United States) Kyle Altman	Portland Timbers Reserves		
April 16, 2013	(Brazil) Pablo Campos	San Antonio Scorpions		
August 1, 2013	(United States) Mike Ambersley	Tampa Bay Rowdies	Swap for Etienne Barbara	
August 6, 2013	(Jamaica) Omar Daley	(Scotland) Motherwell F.C.		

=== Out ===
Date	Player	To	Fee	Ref.
January 1, 2013	(United States) Neil Hlavaty	(Canada) Edmonton		
February 1, 2013	(Jamaica) Amani Walker	Tampa Bay Rowdies		
March 1, 2013	(United States) Devin Del Do	Tampa Bay Rowdies		
March 1, 2013	(United States) Kyle Altman	Portland Timbers Reserves		
April 2013	(Ethiopia) Fuad Ibrahim	(Finland) Kajaani		
July 4, 2013	(United States) Kyle Altman	Retired		
July 5, 2013	(United States) Bryan Arguez	Carolina Railhawks		
August 1, 2013	(Malta) Etienne Barbara	Tampa Bay Rowdies	Swap for Mike Ambersley	
2013	(Cameroon) Ernest Tchoupe			
2013	(United States) Daniel Wasson	Tulsa Athletics		
2013	(United States) Shawn Chin	VSI Tampa Bay		
2013	(United States) Andy Lorei			
2013	(Uruguay) Martin Nuñez		Released	
2013	(Brazil) Geison Moura		Released	

=== Loans in ===
From	Player	Date	Return date	Ref.
August 12, 2013	(Scotland) Calum Mallace	(Canada) Montreal Impact	End of Fall Championship	
August 12, 2013	(Bosnia and Herzegovina) Siniša Ubiparipović	(Canada) Montreal Impact	End of Fall Championship	

== Friendlies ==
March 15, 2013	Minnesota United	0–0	Bridges FC	Minneapolis
CDT (UTC−5)		Report		Stadium: Augsburg College

March 15, 2013	Minnesota United	3–0	Bridges FC	Minneapolis
CDT (UTC−5)	Heitor-Piffer 15'; Salciccia 25'; Wall	Report		Stadium: Augsburg College

March 29, 2013	Chicago Fire Soccer Club	0–1	Minnesota United	Bridgeview
10:00 CDT (UTC−5)	Lelis (red card) 90+'	Report	Ibarra 72'	Stadium: Toyota Park Practice Field

== Competitions ==
=== NASL Spring season ===
==== Standings ====
Pos	Team	Pld	W	D	L	GF	GA	GD	Pts	Qualification
1	Atlanta Silverbacks (S)	12	6	3	3	20	15	+5	21	Soccer Bowl 2013
2	Carolina RailHawks	12	5	5	2	20	16	+4	20	
3	San Antonio Scorpions	12	6	2	4	19	15	+4	20	
4	Tampa Bay Rowdies	12	5	3	4	21	16	+5	18	
5	FC Edmonton	12	3	5	4	13	12	+1	14	
6	Minnesota United FC	12	4	2	6	18	23	−5	14	
7	Fort Lauderdale Strikers	12	2	2	8	10	24	−14	8	

Source: NASL Standings
Rules for classification: 1) points; 2) goal difference; 3) number of goals scored.
(S) Spring season champion

==== Results summary ====
Overall								Home						Away					
Pld	W	D	L	GF	GA	GD	Pts	W	D	L	GF	GA	GD	W	D	L	GF	GA	GD
12	4	2	6	18	23	−5	14	2	2	2	8	9	−1	2	0	4	10	14	−4

Last updated: July 4, 2013.
Source: Match reports

==== Results ====
April 5, 2013 1	Minnesota United	0–0	San Antonio Scorpions	Minneapolis
18:00 CDT (UTC−5)		Summary	Jordan (yellow card) 81'	Stadium: Hubert H. Humphrey Metrodome; Attendance: 6,754; Referee: Younes Marrakchi

April 20, 2013 2	Minnesota United	2–0	Edmonton	Minneapolis
14:30 CDT (UTC−5)	Pitchkolan (yellow card) 25'; Bracalello 31', (yellow card) 45'; Rodríguez 74'; Wall (yellow card) 86'	Summary	Saiko (yellow card) 26'; Mitchell (yellow card) 70'	Stadium: Hubert H. Humphrey Metrodome; Attendance: 4,135; Referee: Alejandro Mariscal

April 27, 2013 3	Atlanta Silverbacks	2–3	Minnesota United	Atlanta
18:30 CDT (UTC−5)	Blanco 17'; Luna 26'; Ferreira-Mendes (yellow card) 81'	Summary	Bri.Kallman 23', (yellow card) 46'; Bracalello (yellow card) 43', (goal) 54'; Pitchkolan 61'	Stadium: Atlanta Silverbacks Park; Attendance: 5,000; Referee: Ted Unkel

May 4, 2013 4	Minnesota United	2–2	Carolina RailHawks	Minneapolis
19:15 CDT (UTC−5)	Barbara 58', 65'	Summary	Graye 40'; Martinez 84'; Franks (yellow card) 89'	Stadium: Hubert H. Humphrey Metrodome; Attendance: 4,825; Referee: Kevin Terry, Jr.

May 11, 2013 5	Fort Lauderdale Strikers	2–1	Minnesota United	Fort Lauderdale
18:45 CDT (UTC−5)	Anderson 2'; Foley 14'; Guillaume (yellow card) 45' (yellow-red card) 58'; Dimitrov (yellow card) 90'	Summary	Altman (yellow card) 43'; Cristiano (yellow card) 62'; Campos 69'; Arguez (yellow card) 90'	Stadium: Lockhart Stadium; Attendance: 4,323; Referee: Cedric Adams

May 18, 2013 6	Minnesota United	2–3	Tampa Bay Rowdies	Minneapolis
14:30 CDT (UTC−5)	Reed 54'; Bracalello 66'	Summary	Hill 45'; Mulholland 55'; Savage 90'; Scott (yellow card) 90'	Stadium: Hubert H. Humphrey Metrodome; Attendance: 4,053; Referee: Geoff Gamble

May 25, 2013 7	Tampa Bay Rowdies	2–3	Minnesota United	St. Petersburg
18:30 CDT (UTC−5)	Arango (yellow card) 12'; Hristov 14', 29'; Scott (yellow card) 45'; Mulholland (yellow card) 45'; Cox (yellow card) 55'	Summary	Cristiano 10'; Moura 23', (yellow card) 77'; Bracalello 26'; Arguez (yellow card) 55'; Takada (yellow card) 57'	Stadium: Al Lang Stadium; Attendance: 3,372; Referee: Younes Marrakchi

June 1, 2013 8	San Antonio Scorpions	2–0	Minnesota United	San Antonio
19:30 CDT (UTC−5)	Wagner 1'; Ramírez 45'; Denissen (yellow card) 63'; Jordan (yellow card) 78'	Summary	Cristiano (yellow card) 61'	Stadium: Toyota Field; Attendance: 6,763; Referee: Jose Carlos Rivero

June 8, 2013 9	Minnesota United	2–1	Fort Lauderdale Strikers	Minneapolis
19:00 CDT (UTC−5)	Campos 55', 90'	Summary	King 9'; Gordon (yellow card) 27'; Ramos (yellow card) 28'; Ståhl (yellow card) 63'	Stadium: Hubert H. Humphrey Metrodome; Attendance: 5,754; Referee: Tyler Ploeger

June 22, 2013 10	Carolina RailHawks	3–2	Minnesota United	Cary
18:00 CDT (UTC−5)	Franks 25'; Shriver (yellow card) 53', (goal) 86', 88'	Summary	Bracalello 4'; Campos 10', (yellow card) 62'; Arguez (yellow card) 75'	Stadium: WakeMed Soccer Park; Attendance: 3,350; Referee: Geoff Gamble

June 30, 2013 11	Edmonton	3–1	Minnesota United	Edmonton
15:00 CDT (UTC−5)	Roberts 11'; Fordyce 24'; Cox (yellow card) 33'; Laing (yellow card) 75'; Nurse (yellow card) 80'; Hlavaty 85'	Summary	Ibarra 67'; Cristiano (yellow card) 88'	Stadium: Clarke Stadium; Attendance: 2,223; Referee: David Barrie

July 4, 2013 12	Minnesota United	0–3	Atlanta Silverbacks	Minneapolis
19:00 CDT (UTC−5)	Griffin (yellow card) 14'; Campos (yellow card) 43'; Davis (yellow card) 64'; Bri.Kallman (yellow card) 75'; Takada (yellow card) 83'; Moura (red card) 90'	Summary	Stisser 30', (yellow card) 30'; Randolph (yellow card) 64'; Reiss 73'; Luna 82'; Blanco (yellow card) 87'	Stadium: Hubert H. Humphrey Metrodome; Attendance: 6,507; Referee: Daniel Radford

=== NASL Fall season ===
==== Standings ====
Pos	Team	Pld	W	D	L	GF	GA	GD	Pts	Qualification
1	New York Cosmos (F)	14	9	4	1	22	12	+10	31	Soccer Bowl 2013
2	Carolina RailHawks	14	7	2	5	21	16	+5	23	
3	Tampa Bay Rowdies	14	5	5	4	30	27	+3	20	
4	Minnesota United FC	14	6	2	6	21	19	+2	20	
5	Fort Lauderdale Strikers	14	5	3	6	18	20	−2	18	
6	FC Edmonton	14	3	7	4	13	14	−1	16	
7	Atlanta Silverbacks	14	4	4	6	14	22	−8	16	
8	San Antonio Scorpions	14	3	1	10	15	24	−9	10	

Source: NASL Standings
Rules for classification: 1) points; 2) goal difference; 3) number of goals scored.
(F) Fall season champion

==== Results summary ====
Overall								Home						Away					
Pld	W	D	L	GF	GA	GD	Pts	W	D	L	GF	GA	GD	W	D	L	GF	GA	GD
14	6	2	6	21	19	+2	20	2	2	3	6	6	0	4	0	3	15	13	+2

Last updated: November 2, 2013.
Source: Match reports

==== Results ====
August 3, 2013 1	Minnesota United	0–1	Atlanta Silverbacks	Blaine
19:19 CDT (UTC−5)	Franks (yellow card) 88'; Kallman (red card) 90+1'	Report	Navarro (yellow card) 14'; Randolph 22'; Reiss (yellow card) 67'	Stadium: National Sports Center; Attendance: 5,884; Referee: Sorin Stoica

August 10, 2013 2	Fort Lauderdale Strikers	1–3	Minnesota United	Fort Lauderdale
18:30 CDT (UTC−5)	Walker (yellow card) 39'; Núñez 80'	Report	Griffin 73'; Alves 76' (o.g.); Campos (yellow card) 70', (goal) 90'	Stadium: Lockhart Stadium; Attendance: 3,295; Referee: Edvin Jurisevic

August 17, 2013 3	Minnesota United	1–1	Tampa Bay Rowdies	Blaine
19:00 CDT (UTC−5)	Campos 17'; Bracalello (yellow card) 29'	Report	Frimpong (yellow card) 68'; Del Do (yellow card) 90'; Arango 90'	Stadium: National Sports Center; Attendance: 5,634; Referee: Daniel Radford

August 24, 2013 4	Carolina RailHawks	1–0	Minnesota United	Cary
18:00 CDT (UTC−5)	Shriver 52'; Ortiz (yellow card) 54'	Report		Stadium: WakeMed Soccer Park; Attendance: 5,201; Referee: Drew Fischer

August 31, 2013 5	San Antonio Scorpions	2–3	Minnesota United	San Antonio
19:30 CDT (UTC−5)	Ramírez 14'; Jennings (red card) 58'; Zahorski 78'	Report	Campos (yellow card) 15', (goal) 34', 50'; Mallace (yellow card) 85'; Tobin 90'	Stadium: Toyota Field; Attendance: 5,886; Referee: Mark Kadlecik

September 7, 2013 6	Minnesota United	1–1	Edmonton	Blaine
18:00 CDT (UTC−5)	Ubiparipović (red card) 61'; Cristiano 76'	Report	Hlavaty (yellow card) 28'; Hertzog 77'	Stadium: National Sports Center; Attendance: 3,874; Referee: Geoff Gamble

September 14, 2013 7	New York Cosmos	1–0	Minnesota United	Hempstead
18:00 CDT (UTC−5)	Rovérsio (yellow card) 69'; Guenzatti 77'; Freeman (red card) 80'	Report	Pitchkolan (yellow card) 31'; Cristiano (yellow card) 71'; Ibarra (yellow card) 77'	Stadium: James M. Shuart Stadium; Attendance: 6,081; Referee: Robert Sibiga

September 22, 2013 8	Edmonton	1–2	Minnesota United	Edmonton
15:00 CDT (UTC−5)	Fordyce 90'	Report	Mallace 37', (yellow card) 78'; Bracalello 62'	Stadium: Clarke Stadium; Attendance: 3,143; Referee: David Barrie

September 28, 2013 9	Minnesota United	1–0	San Antonio Scorpions	Blaine
14:30 CDT (UTC−5)	Bracalello (yellow card) 43'; Campos 61'	Report	Wagner (yellow card) 67'; Husić (yellow card) 72'	Stadium: National Sports Center; Attendance: 2,028; Referee: David Gantar

October 5, 2013 10	Minnesota United	0–1	New York Cosmos	Blaine
19:00 CDT (UTC−5)	Kallman (yellow card) 50'	Report	Freeman (yellow card) 27'; Ayoze (yellow card) 39'; Mendes 53'	Stadium: National Sports Center; Attendance: 3,629; Referee: Mark Kadlecik

October 12, 2013 11	Atlanta Silverbacks	3–1	Minnesota United	Atlanta
18:30 CDT (UTC−5)	Luna 42'; Navarro (yellow card) 56'; Barrera 74'; James (yellow card) 88'; Mendes 89' (pen.)	Report	Kallman (yellow card) 40'; Pitchkolan (yellow card) 64'; Bracalello 82' (pen.); Van Oekel (yellow card) 89'	Stadium: Atlanta Silverbacks Park; Attendance: 5,000; Referee: Daniel Fitzgerald

October 19, 2013 12	Minnesota United	0–1	Carolina RailHawks	Blaine
14:30 CDT (UTC−5)	Pitchkolan (yellow card) 61'	Report	Shriver (yellow card) 6'; Martínez 52', (yellow card) 64'; Schilawski (yellow card) 57'; Gaul (yellow card) 87'	Stadium: National Sports Center; Attendance: 2,232; Referee: Alejandro Mariscal

October 26, 2013 13	Minnesota United	3–1	Fort Lauderdale Strikers	Blaine
18:00 CDT (UTC−5)	Campos 10', 74'; Daley (yellow card) 45'; Pitchkolan 45+3'	Report	Salazar 28'; King (yellow card) 38'	Stadium: National Sports Center; Attendance: 2,475; Referee: Allen Chapman

November 2, 2013 14	Tampa Bay Rowdies	4–6	Minnesota United	St. Petersburg
17:30 CDT (UTC−5)	Cort (yellow card) 33'; Mulholland 52' (pen.), (yellow card) 58'; Pitchkolan 65' (o.g.); Frimpong 85', 90'	Report	Franks 10'; Daley 17', 60', 83'; Campos 71', 90' (pen.), (yellow card) 90'	Stadium: Al Lang Stadium; Attendance: 4,319; Referee: Ted Unkel

=== U.S. Open Cup ===
May 21, 2013 Second Round	Minnesota United	0–1	Des Moines Menace	St.Paul
20:30 CDT (UTC−5)	Cristiano (yellow card) 34'	Report	Hoek (yellow card) 42'; Lax (yellow card) 67'; Fricke 86'	Stadium: Robbie Stadium; Attendance: 1,009

== Squad statistics ==
As of match played November 2, 2013

=== Appearances and goals ===
No.	Pos	Nat	Player	Total		NASL Spring Season		NASL Fall Season		U.S. Open Cup	
No.	Pos	Nat	Player	Apps	Goals	Apps	Goals	Apps	Goals	Apps	Goals
0	MF	(United States) USA	Floyd Franks	13	1	0	0	8+5	1	0	0
1	GK	(United States) USA	Mitch Hildebrandt	2	0	0	0	2	0	0	0
2	DF	(United States) USA	Justin Davis	19	0	12	0	7	0	0	0
3	DF	(Brazil) BRA	Cristiano Dias	18	2	8+1	1	9	1	0	0
4	MF	(United States) USA	Aaron Pitchkolan	20	2	6+1	1	13	1	0	0
5	DF	(Bosnia and Herzegovina) BIH	Edi Buro	1	0	0	0	1	0	0	0
6	DF	(United States) USA	Kevin Friedland	3	0	1+1	0	0+1	0	0	0
7	FW	(Italy) ITA	Simone Bracalello	22	7	10+1	5	8+3	2	0	0
8	MF	(United States) USA	Michael Reed	15	1	8+1	1	5+1	0	0	0
9	FW	(Brazil) BRA	Pablo Campos	23	13	10	4	12	9	1	0
10	FW	(United States) USA	Mike Ambersley	13	0	0	0	8+5	0	0	0
11	FW	(United States) USA	Maxwell Griffin	14	1	4+1	0	4+5	1	0	0
13	MF	(Japan) JPN	Kentaro Takada	15	0	6+3	0	3+3	0	0	0
14	DF	(United States) USA	Brian Kallman	18	1	12	1	5+1	0	0	0
15	MF	(Trinidad and Tobago) TTO	Sean de Silva	3	0	0+3	0	0	0	0	0
16	MF	(Scotland) SCO	Calum Mallace	12	1	0	0	11+1	1	0	0
17	MF	(Jamaica) JAM	Omar Daley	6	3	0	0	2+4	3	0	0
19	DF	(Brazil) BRA	Luis Heitor-Piffer	1	0	0+1	0	0	0	0	0
20	DF	(United States) USA	Connor Tobin	17	1	4	0	13	1	0	0
21	FW	(United States) USA	Travis Wall	9	0	0+7	0	1+1	0	0	0
22	MF	(United States) USA	Kevin Venegas	16	0	2+4	0	9+1	0	0	0
23	MF	(United States) USA	Miguel Ibarra	27	1	10+2	1	11+3	0	1	0
25	FW	(United States) USA	Nate Polak	1	0	0	0	0+1	0	0	0
27	DF	(United States) USA	Brent Kallman	2	0	1	0	0	0	1	0
28	MF	(Bosnia and Herzegovina) BIH	Siniša Ubiparipović	7	0	0	0	4+3	0	0	0
30	GK	(United States) USA	Matt Van Oekel	19	0	6	0	12	0	1	0
32	MF	(Argentina) ARG	Lucas Rodríguez	11	1	4+1	1	6	0	0	0
33	GK	(United States) USA	Daryl Sattler	6	0	6	0	0	0	0	0
Players who left Minnesota United during the season:
10	FW	(Malta) MLT	Etienne Barbara	7	2	6+1	2	0	0	0	0
16	DF	(United States) USA	Kyle Altman	10	0	10	0	0	0	0	0
17	MF	(United States) USA	Bryan Arguez	5	0	4+1	0	0	0	0	0
99	FW	(Brazil) BRA	Geison Moura	3	1	2+1	1	0	0	0	0

=== Goal scorers ===
Place	Position	Nation	Number	Name	NASL Spring Season	NASL Fall Season	U.S. Open Cup	Total
1	FW	(Brazil)	9	Pablo Campos	4	9	0	13
2	FW	(Italy)	7	Simone Bracalello	5	2	0	7
3	MF	(Jamaica)	17	Omar Daley	0	3	0	3
4	FW	(Malta)	10	Etienne Barbara	2	0	0	2
4	MF	(United States)	4	Aaron Pitchkolan	1	1	0	2
4	DF	(Brazil)	3	Cristiano Dias	1	1	0	2
7	MF	(Argentina)	32	Lucas Rodríguez	1	0	0	1
7	DF	(United States)	14	Brian Kallman	1	0	0	1
7	MF	(United States)	8	Michael Reed	1	0	0	1
7	FW	(Brazil)	99	Geison Moura	1	0	0	1
7	MF	(United States)	23	Miguel Ibarra	1	0	0	1
7	FW	(United States)	11	Maxwell Griffin	0	1	0	1
7	DF	(United States)	20	Connor Tobin	0	1	0	1
7	MF	(Scotland)	16	Calum Mallace	0	1	0	1
7	MF	(United States)	0	Floyd Franks	0	1	0	1
7				Own goal	0	1	0	1
TOTALS					18	21	0	39

=== Disciplinary record ===
Number	Nation	Position	Name	NASL Spring Season		NASL Fall Season		U.S. Open Cup		Total	
Number	Nation	Position	Name	Yellow card	Red card	Yellow card	Red card	Yellow card	Red card	Yellow card	Red card
0	(United States)	MF	Floyd Franks	0	0	1	0	0	0	1	0
2	(United States)	DF	Justin Davis	1	0	0	0	0	0	1	0
3	(Brazil)	DF	Cristiano Dias	3	0	1	0	0	0	4	0
4	(United States)	MF	Aaron Pitchkolan	1	0	3	0	0	0	4	0
7	(Italy)	FW	Simone Bracalello	2	0	2	0	0	0	4	0
9	(Brazil)	FW	Pablo Campos	2	0	3	0	0	0	5	0
11	(United States)	FW	Maxwell Griffin	1	0	0	0	0	0	1	0
13	(Japan)	MF	Kentaro Takada	2	0	0	0	0	0	2	0
14	(United States)	DF	Brian Kallman	2	0	2	1	0	0	4	1
16	(United States)	DF	Kyle Altman	1	0	0	0	0	0	1	0
16	(Scotland)	MF	Calum Mallace	0	0	2	0	0	0	2	0
17	(United States)	MF	Bryan Arguez	3	0	0	0	0	0	3	0
17	(Jamaica)	MF	Omar Daley	0	0	1	0	0	0	1	0
21	(United States)	FW	Travis Wall	1	0	0	0	0	0	1	0
23	(United States)	MF	Miguel Ibarra	0	0	1	0	0	0	1	0
28	(Bosnia and Herzegovina)	MF	Siniša Ubiparipović	0	0	0	1	0	0	0	1
30	(United States)	GK	Matt Van Oekel	0	0	1	0	0	0	1	0
99	(Brazil)	FW	Geison Moura	1	1	0	0	0	0	1	1
			TOTALS	20	1	17	2	0	0	37	3
