= 2012 Minnesota Stars FC season =

NSC Minnesota Stars
2012 season
- Owner: Paul Erickson
- Head coach: Manny Lagos
- Stadium: National Sports Center
- NASL: 3rd
- NASL Playoffs: Runners-Up
- U.S. Open Cup: Fourth round vs San Jose Earthquakes
- Top goalscorer: League: Amani Walker (7); All: Amani Walker (9)
Home colors	Away colors

The 2012 Minnesota Stars FC season was the club's third year of existence and their first season under the simple moniker Minnesota Stars after being called NSC Minnesota Stars for their first two seasons of existence. The team played in the North American Soccer League, the second tier of the American soccer pyramid, for the second consecutive year.

Outside of NASL play, the Stars competed in the 2012 U.S. Open Cup, reaching the fourth round before losing to the San Jose Earthquakes of Major League Soccer.

== Background ==
The Minnesota Stars FC Started the 2012 Regular season as the defending NASL Champions. The home opener was scheduled at the Hubert H. Humphrey Metrodome vs the defending NASL regular season champions, the Carolina RailHawks.

The Stars were still leagued owned at the start of the season; this could have meant that the 2012 season could have been the last season for the franchise.

On November 8, 2012, NASL announced that Dr. William McGuire would be the new owner of the Stars, saving the Stars from possible contraction.

== Roster ==
As of match played October 27, 2012

No.	Name	Nationality	Position	Date of birth (age)	Signed from	Signed in	Contract ends	Apps.	Goals
Goalkeepers
1	Mitch Hildebrandt	(United States)	GK	12 November 1988 (aged 23)	Oakland Golden Grizzlies	2012		3	0
30	Matt Van Oekel	(United States)	GK	20 September 1986 (aged 26)	Minnesota Thunder	2010		41	0
Defenders
2	Justin Davis	(United States)	DF	6 May 1988 (aged 24)	New Mexico Lobos	2011		60	2
3	Cristiano	(Brazil)	DF	25 May 1986 (aged 26)	Miami	2011		44	1
5	Edi Buro	(Bosnia and Herzegovina)	DF	19 September 1987 (aged 25)	(Bosnia and Herzegovina) Travnik	2012			
6	Kevin Friedland	(United States)	DF	3 October 1981 (aged 31)	Kansas City Wizards	2004		33	1
14	Brian Kallman	(United States)	DF	23 April 1984 (aged 28)	Minnesota Thunder	2010		64	1
15	Evan Sassano	(United States)	DF	22 November 1987 (aged 24)		2012			
16	Kyle Altman	(United States)	DF	31 January 1986 (aged 26)	Minnesota Thunder	2010			
20	Connor Tobin	(United States)	DF	11 February 1987 (aged 25)	Rochester Rhinos	2012			
28	Ernest Tchoupe	(Cameroon)	DF	23 December 1987 (aged 24)	(Colombia) Expreso Rojo	2012			
Midfielders
4	Neil Hlavaty	(United States)	MF	27 December 1986 (aged 25)	(Poland) Jagiellonia Białystok	2010		85	13
8	Daniel Wasson	(United States)	MF	15 June 1984 (aged 28)	(Germany) VfL Osnabrück	2010			
13	Kentaro Takada	(Japan)	MF	13 April 1983 (aged 29)	Rochester Thunder	2010			
19	Shawn Chin	(United States)	MF	11 May 1989 (aged 23)	(Canada) Edmonton	2012			
22	Kevin Venegas	(United States)	MF	29 July 1989 (aged 23)	Fullerton Titans	2010		23	2
23	Miguel Ibarra	(United States)	MF	15 March 1990 (aged 22)	UC Irvine Anteaters	2012		31	5
24	Michael Reed	(United States)	MF	28 October 1987 (aged 24)	PSC Soccer Academy	2012			
32	Lucas Rodríguez	(Argentina)	MF	8 February 1986 (aged 26)	Kansas City Brass	2010			
77	Andy Lorei	(United States)	MF	25 March 1989 (aged 23)	Real Maryland	2011			
Forwards
7	Fuad Ibrahim	(Ethiopia)	FW	15 August 1991 (aged 21)		2012			
9	Martin Nuñez	(Uruguay)	FW	2 February 1987 (aged 25)	Fort Lauderdale Strikers	2012			
10	Simone Bracalello	(Italy)	FW	21 October 1985 (aged 27)		2010		83	20
11	Amani Walker	(Jamaica)	FW	16 December 1989 (aged 22)	Orange County Blue Star	2011		48	10
17	Geison Moura	(Brazil)	MF	16 July 1986 (aged 26)	Rockford Rampage	2010			
21	Devin Del Do	(United States)	FW	21 May 1986 (aged 26)		2010			
26	Travis Wall	(United States)	FW	4 January 1990 (aged 22)	Columbus Crew	2012			
Players away on loan
Players who left during the season

== Transfers ==
=== Winter ===
In: Note: Flags indicate national team as defined under FIFA eligibility rules; some limited exceptions apply. Players may hold more than one non-FIFA nationality.

No.	Pos.	Nation	Player
1	GK	USA	Mitch Hildebrandt (from (United States) Oakland Golden Grizzlies)
5	DF	BIH	Edi Buro (from (Bosnia and Herzegovina) Travnik)
7	FW	ETH	Fuad Ibrahim
9	FW	URU	Martin Nuñez (from (United States) Fort Lauderdale Strikers)
15	DF	USA	Evan Sassano
19	MF	USA	Shawn Chin (from (Canada) Edmonton)
20	DF	USA	Connor Tobin (from (United States) Rochester Rhinos)
22	MF	USA	Kevin Venegas (from (United States) Fullerton Titans)
23	MF	USA	Miguel Ibarra (from (United States) UC Irvine Anteaters)
24	DF	USA	Michael Reed (from (United States) PSC Soccer Academy)
26	FW	USA	Travis Wall
28	DF	CMR	Ernest Tchoupe (from (Colombia) Expreso Rojo)

Out: Note: Flags indicate national team as defined under FIFA eligibility rules; some limited exceptions apply. Players may hold more than one non-FIFA nationality.

No.	Pos.	Nation	Player
1	GK	USA	Joe Warren (Retired)
7	MF	BLR	Andrei Gotsmanov
9	FW	USA	Tino Nuñez (to (United States) Pittsburgh Riverhounds)
10	MF	LBR	Sandy Gbandi
11	DF	USA	Chris Clements
15	DF	USA	John Gilkerson
18	MF	USA	Jeff Cosgriff
20	FW	USA	Brian Cvilikas
23	MF	ENG	Ryan Woods (to (England) Carshalton Athletic)
25	FW	USA	Anthony Hamilton
26	MF	USA	Ely Allen
28	FW	ENG	Luke Mulholland (to (United States) Tampa Bay Rowdies)

=== Summer ===
In: Note: Flags indicate national team as defined under FIFA eligibility rules; some limited exceptions apply. Players may hold more than one non-FIFA nationality.

No.	Pos.	Nation	Player

Out: Note: Flags indicate national team as defined under FIFA eligibility rules; some limited exceptions apply. Players may hold more than one non-FIFA nationality.

No.	Pos.	Nation	Player

== Friendlies ==
March 9, 2012	Chicago Fire Soccer Club	3–1	Minnesota Stars	Bridgeview
10:00 CDT (UTC−5)		Report		Stadium: Toyota Park Practice Field

March 9, 2012	Chicago Fire Reserves	1–1	Minnesota Stars	Bridgeview
12:30 CDT (UTC−5)		Report		Stadium: Toyota Park Practice Field

March 16, 2012	Hastings College	1–2	Minnesota Stars	Hastings
14:00 CDT (UTC−5)		Report

March 18, 2012	Omaha Mavericks	1–2	Minnesota Stars	Omaha
13:00 CDT (UTC−5)		Report		Stadium: Creighton University

April 2, 2012	Minnesota Stars (United States)	2–0	(Canada) Edmonton	Minneapolis
13:00 CDT (UTC−5)		Report		Stadium: Minneapolis Sculpture Garden

== Competitions ==
=== NASL ===
==== Standings ====
Pos	Team	Pld	W	D	L	GF	GA	GD	Pts	Qualification
4	Carolina RailHawks	28	10	10	8	44	46	−2	40	Playoff quarterfinals
5	Fort Lauderdale Strikers	28	9	9	10	40	46	−6	36	Playoff quarterfinals
6	Minnesota United	28	8	11	9	34	33	+1	35	Playoff quarterfinals
7	Atlanta Silverbacks	28	7	9	12	35	46	−11	30	
8	FC Edmonton	28	5	10	13	26	36	−10	25	

Source: NASL Standings
Rules for classification: 1) points; 2) goal difference; 3) number of goals scored.

==== Results ====
April 7, 2012 1	Minnesota Stars	0–0	Carolina RailHawks	Minneapolis
19:30 CDT (UTC−5)	Takada (yellow card) 73'	Summary	Nurse (yellow card) 67'	Stadium: Humphrey Metrodome; Attendance: 8,693; Referee: Terry Vaughn

April 14, 2012 2	Fort Lauderdale Strikers	0–0	Minnesota Stars	Fort Lauderdale
18:30 CDT (UTC−5)	Lorenz (yellow card) 83'	Summary	Takada (yellow card) 52'; Friedland (yellow card) 72'; Del Do (yellow card) 78'	Stadium: Lockhart Stadium; Attendance: 2,916; Referee: Sorin Stoica

April 22, 2012 3	Edmonton	3–4	Minnesota Stars	Edmonton
15:30 CDT (UTC−5)	Saiko 5'; Hatchi (red card) 7'; Hamilton 52'; Porter 63'; Rago (yellow card) 84'	Summary	Hlavaty 8' (pen.); Altman 16' (red card) 30'; Takada 68'; Del Do 90+2'	Stadium: Foote Field; Attendance: 1,273; Referee: Justin Tasev

April 28, 2012 4	Atlanta Silverbacks	3–3	Minnesota Stars	Chamblee
18:30 CDT (UTC−5)	Navia 48', 64' (yellow card) 81'; Santamaria 79'	Summary	Walker 66'; Del Do 88'; Davis 90' (yellow card) 90'	Stadium: Silverbacks Park; Attendance: 4,176

May 5, 2012 5	Minnesota Stars	2–0	Atlanta Silverbacks	Blaine
19:30 CDT (UTC−5)	Tchoupe 24' (yellow card) 40'; Takada (yellow card) 42'; Davis (yellow card) 59'; Ibarra 76'	Summary	Robertson (yellow card) 33'; Lancaster (yellow card) 52'; Carr (yellow card) 59' (red card) 88'; Cox (yellow card) 70'; McManus (yellow card) 70' (yellow-red card) 71'	Stadium: National Sports Center; Attendance: 1,692

May 13, 2012 6	Minnesota Stars	2–1	Carolina RailHawks	Blaine
19:30 CDT (UTC−5)	Walker 16'; Venegas 52'	Summary	Agbossoumonde (yellow card) 60' da Luz 90+1'	Stadium: National Sports Center; Attendance: 2,168

May 20, 2012 7	Fort Lauderdale Strikers	1–3	Minnesota Stars	Fort Lauderdale
18:30 CDT (UTC−5)	Anderson 36'; Thompson (yellow card) 38'; Restrepo (yellow card) 57'	Summary	Walker 45'; Ibarra 63'; Kallman (yellow card) 72'; Davis (yellow card) 80'; Bracalello 83'; Hlavaty (yellow card) 90'	Stadium: Lockhart Stadium; Attendance: 2,720; Referee: Armando Villarreal

May 27, 2012 8	Tampa Bay Rowdies	0–0	Minnesota Stars	St. Petersburg
18:30 CDT (UTC−5)	Campbell (yellow card) 69'	Summary		Stadium: Progress Energy Park; Attendance: 3,182; Referee: Ted Unkel

June 3, 2012 9	San Antonio Scorpions	0–0	Minnesota Stars	San Antonio
19:30 CDT (UTC−5)		Summary	Ibrahim (yellow card) 63'	Stadium: Heroes Stadium; Attendance: 8,639; Referee: Jorge Luna

June 10, 2012 10	Carolina RailHawks	5–1	Minnesota Stars	Cary
18:00 CDT (UTC−5)	King 24'; Lowery (yellow card) 25'; Zimmerman 41'; Shriver 53'; Schilawski 61'; Garey 90+4'	Summary	Bracalello 45+2'; Altman (yellow card) 82'; Hlavaty (yellow card) 82'; Davis (yellow card) 90'	Stadium: WakeMed Soccer Park; Attendance: 2,580; Referee: Marcos de Oliveira

June 17, 2012 11	Minnesota Stars	1–2	Tampa Bay Rowdies	Blaine
19:30 CDT (UTC−5)	Nuñez 8' (yellow card) 25'; Kallman (yellow card) 90+1'	Summary	Yoshitake 45+1'; Hill (yellow card) 45+1'; Savage 85'; Ambersley (yellow card) 89'	Stadium: National Sports Center; Attendance: 2,908

June 24, 2012 12	Minnesota Stars	2–1	Fort Lauderdale Strikers	Blaine
19:30 CDT (UTC−5)	Hlavaty 17' (pen.); Tobin (yellow card) 24'; Bracalello 39'; Nuñez (yellow card) 69'	Summary	Otte (yellow card) 5'; Herron (yellow card) 15'; Ståhl (yellow card) 16'; Anderson 26'; Lorenz (yellow card) 83'	Stadium: National Sports Center; Attendance: 2,442

July 1, 2012 13	Tampa Bay Rowdies	2–0	Minnesota Stars	St. Petersburg
19:30 CDT (UTC−5)	Ambersley 55'; Yoshitake 88'	Summary		Stadium: Progress Energy Park; Attendance: 2,594; Referee: Kevin Terry

July 5, 2012 14	Minnesota Stars	4–0	Puerto Rico Islanders	Blaine
19:30 CDT (UTC−5)	Hlavaty (yellow card) 15'; Nuñez 18', 55'; Bracalello 45'; Walker 81'	Report	vanSchaik (yellow card) 78'	Stadium: National Sports Center; Attendance: 2,199

July 8, 2012 15	Minnesota Stars	0–2	Atlanta Silverbacks	Blaine
19:30 CDT (UTC−5)	Venegas (yellow card) 35'	Report	Horth 10'; Duran (yellow card) 43'; McManus (yellow card) 68'; Carr 75'	Stadium: National Sports Center; Attendance: 1,728

July 13, 2012 16	Minnesota Stars	2–1	Tampa Bay Rowdies	Blaine
19:30 CDT (UTC−5)	Nuñez 30'; Cristiano (yellow card) 37'; Takada 44'; Venegas (yellow card) 64'	Report	Ambersley 78'	Stadium: National Sports Center; Attendance: 2,164

July 19, 2012 17	Minnesota Stars	1–2	Fort Lauderdale Strikers	Blaine
19:30 CDT (UTC−5)	Bracalello (yellow card) 38' (goal) 64'; Nuñez (yellow card) 70'	Report	Stewart (yellow card) 29'; Anderson 34', 42'; King (yellow card) 40'; Herron (yellow card) 62'	Stadium: National Sports Center; Attendance: 4,034

July 22, 2012 18	Carolina RailHawks	1–0	Minnesota Stars	Cary
18:00 CDT (UTC−5)	Schilawski 10'; Lowery (yellow card) 60'; Low (yellow card) 72' (yellow-red card) 77'	Report	E.Sassano (yellow card) 69'; Bracalello (yellow card) 81'	Stadium: WakeMed Soccer Park; Attendance: 3,158

July 29, 2012 19	Puerto Rico Islanders	1–0	Minnesota Stars	Bayamón, Puerto Rico
18:30 CDT (UTC−5)	Vázquez (yellow card) 39'; Delgado 49' (yellow card) 67'; Telesford (yellow card) 67'; Nurse (yellow card) 76'; Faña (yellow card) 81'	Report	Davis (yellow card) 86'; Ibarra (red card) 90'	Stadium: Juan Ramón Loubriel Stadium; Attendance: 1,357

August 5, 2012 20	Edmonton	1–1	Minnesota Stars	Edmonton
20:05 CDT (UTC−5)	Barthélémy (yellow card) 20'; Cox 88'; Hamilton (red card) 90'	Report	Nuñez 44'	Stadium: Clarke Stadium; Attendance: 1,536

August 12, 2012 21	Minnesota Stars	0–1	San Antonio Scorpions	Blaine
19:30 CDT (UTC−5)	Kallman (yellow card) 88'; Nuñez (yellow card) 90+1'	Report	Wagner (yellow card) 26'; Denissen 71' (pen.); Campos (yellow card) 77'; Knight (yellow card) 90+1'	Stadium: National Sports Center; Attendance: 3,221

August 19, 2012 22	Atlanta Silverbacks	0–0	Minnesota Stars	Chamblee
18:30 CDT (UTC−5)	O'Brien (yellow card) 61' (yellow-red card) 61'	Summary	Altman (yellow card) 23'; Davis (yellow card) 90'	Stadium: Atlanta Silverbacks Park; Attendance: 3,911

August 26, 2012 23	Minnesota Stars	1–1	Edmonton	Blaine
19:30 CDT (UTC−5)	Cristiano 17'; Davis (yellow card) 40'; Venegas (yellow card) 44'	Summary	Hamilton (yellow card) 19'; Arguez 74'	Stadium: National Sports Center; Attendance: 2,427

September 2, 2012 24	Minnesota Stars	1–1	San Antonio Scorpions	Blaine
19:30 CDT (UTC−5)	Walker 33'; Takada (yellow card) 45'; Kallman (yellow card) 63'	Summary	Pitchkolan (yellow card) 15'; Janicki (yellow card) 60'; Denissen 69' (yellow card) 73'; Harmse (yellow card) 79'	Stadium: National Sports Center; Attendance: 1,705

September 8, 2012 25	Minnesota Stars	1–1	Edmonton	Blaine
19:30 CDT (UTC−5)	Walker 19'	Summary	Cox (yellow card) 33'; Saiko 90+2'	Stadium: National Sports Center; Attendance: 2,365

September 11, 2012 26	Minnesota Stars	4–0	Puerto Rico Islanders	Blaine
19:30 CDT (UTC−5)	Polak 16'; Ibarra 45'; Watson 46'; Walker 52'; Venegas (yellow card) 79'; Tobin (yellow card) 86'	Summary	deRoux (yellow card) 24'; Telesford (yellow card) 58'; Foley (yellow card) 68'; Edward (yellow card) 87'	Stadium: National Sports Center; Attendance: 1,402

September 15, 2012 27	Puerto Rico Islanders	2–0	Minnesota Stars	Bayamón, Puerto Rico
19:30 CDT (UTC−5)	Vázquez 21'; Foley 85'	Summary	Tobin (yellow card) 36'; Nuñez (yellow card) 81'	Stadium: Juan Ramón Loubriel Stadium; Attendance: 3,331

September 23, 2012 28	San Antonio Scorpions	1–1	Minnesota Stars	San Antonio
19:00 CDT (UTC−5)	Campos 9'; Denissen (yellow card) 11'; Pitchkolan (yellow card) 52'; Cochrane (yellow card) 78'; Janicki (yellow card) 83'	Summary	Venegas (yellow card) 47'; Rodríguez (yellow card) 58'; Friedland 69'	Stadium: Heroes Stadium; Attendance: 7,996

=== NASL Playoffs ===
September 30, 2012 Quarterfinal	Puerto Rico Islanders	1–2	Minnesota Stars	Bayamón, Puerto Rico
17:00 CDT (UTC−5)	Nurse (yellow card) 68'; Foley 79'; Hansen (yellow card) 81'	Summary	Walker 9'; Ibarra 40'; Davis (yellow card) 90'	Stadium: Juan Ramón Loubriel Stadium; Attendance: 2,002; Referee: Kevin Terry, Jr.

October 6, 2012 Semifinal 1st leg	Minnesota Stars	0–0	San Antonio Scorpions	Blaine
19:30 CDT (UTC−5)	Bracalello (yellow card) 21'	Summary	Harmse (yellow card) 86'	Stadium: National Sports Center; Attendance: 2,006; Referee: Marcos Deoliveira

October 14, 2012 Semifinal 2nd leg	San Antonio Scorpions	1–2 (1–2 agg.)	Minnesota Stars	San Antonio
17:15 CDT (UTC−5)	Ramírez (yellow card) 17'; Campos 25' (red card) 27'; Harmse (yellow card) 54'; Soto (yellow card) 89'	Summary	Altman (yellow card) 27'; Hlavaty (yellow card) 66'; Wagner 77' (o.g.); Bracalello 83'	Stadium: Heroes Stadium; Attendance: 6,249; Referee: Daniel Fitzgerald

==== Soccer Bowl ====
October 20, 2012 1st leg	Minnesota Stars	2–0	Tampa Bay Rowdies	Blaine
19:30 CDT (UTC−5)	Walker 67'; Takada (yellow card) 84'; Nuñez 90+4'	Summary	Ambersley (yellow card) 48'	Stadium: National Sports Center; Attendance: 4,642; Referee: Kevin Terry, Jr.

October 26, 2012 2nd leg	Tampa Bay Rowdies	3–1 (3–3 agg.) (3–2 p)	Minnesota Stars	St. Petersburg
18:30 CDT (UTC−5)	Cort 25' (yellow card) 57'; Ambersley (yellow card) 26'; Savage 51'; Mulholland (yellow card) 82'; Antoniuk 86' (yellow card) 90+1'; Hill (red card) 90'	Summary	Davis (yellow card) 31'; Bracalello (yellow card) 45+1'; Rodríguez 52'	Stadium: Al Lang Stadium; Attendance: 6,208; Referee: Alejandro Mariscal
	Penalties
	Mulholland (penalty scored); Cox (penalty scored); Picault (penalty scored); Cort (penalty missed)		(penalty scored) Hlavaty; (penalty missed) Del Do; (penalty missed) Altman; (penalty scored) Bracalello; (penalty missed) Rodríguez

=== U.S. Open Cup ===
May 22, 2012 Second Round	Des Moines Menace	0–2	Minnesota Stars	West Des Moines
19:30 CDT (UTC−5)	H.Jupic (yellow card) 27'; J.Lopez (yellow card) 73'; Moloto (yellow card) 79'	Report; Report	Bracalello 20'; Cristiano (red card) 40'; Kallman (yellow card) 52'; Ibarra 84'; Venegas (yellow card) 85'	Stadium: Valley Stadium

May 29, 2012 Third Round	Real Salt Lake	1–3	Minnesota Stars	Sandy City
21:00 CDT (UTC−5)	Gil 29'; Velásquez (yellow card) 83'; Olave (yellow card) 85'	Report	Venegas 3'; Hlavaty 45' (pen.); Bracalello 58'	Stadium: Rio Tinto Stadium; Attendance: 17,212; Referee: Tyler Ploeger

June 5, 2012 Fourth Round	San Jose Earthquakes	1–0	Minnesota Stars	Santa Clara
21:00 CDT (UTC−5)	Beitashour (yellow card) 45'; Corrales (yellow card) 55'; Lenhart 85'	Report	Altman (yellow card) 42'; Davis (yellow card) 60'; Kallman (yellow card) 90+3'	Stadium: Buck Shaw Stadium; Attendance: 1,548

== Squad statistics ==
As of Match played October 26, 2012

=== Appearances and goals ===
No.	Pos	Nat	Player	Total		NASL		NASL Playoffs		U.S. Open Cup	
No.	Pos	Nat	Player	Apps	Goals	Apps	Goals	Apps	Goals	Apps	Goals
1	GK	(United States) USA	Mitch Hildebrandt	3	0	3	0	0	0	0	0
2	DF	(United States) USA	Justin Davis	32	1	24	1	5	0	3	0
3	DF	(Brazil) BRA	Cristiano	21	1	17+2	1	0	0	2	0
4	MF	(United States) USA	Neil Hlavaty	32	3	23+1	2	5	0	3	1
5	MF	(Bosnia and Herzegovina) BIH	Edi Buro	2	0	0+2	0	0	0	0	0
6	DF	(United States) USA	Kevin Friedland	8	1	5+2	1	0	0	0+1	0
7	FW	(United States) USA	Fuad Ibrahim	4	0	2+2	0	0	0	0	0
8	MF	(United States) USA	Daniel Wasson	8	0	4+4	0	0	0	0	0
9	FW	(Uruguay) URU	Martin Nuñez	28	6	16+9	5	0+3	1	0	0
10	FW	(Italy) ITA	Simone Bracalello	31	8	15+8	5	5	1	3	2
11	FW	(Jamaica) JAM	Amani Walker	29	9	16+5	7	5	2	2+1	0
12	MF	(United States) USA	Jamie Watson	8	1	3	1	5	0	0	0
13	MF	(Japan) JPN	Kentaro Takada	29	2	22+2	2	2+3	0	0	0
14	DF	(United States) USA	Brian Kallman	32	0	24	0	5	0	3	0
15	DF	(United States) USA	Evan Sassano	3	0	3	0	0	0	0	0
16	DF	(United States) USA	Kyle Altman	25	1	20	1	5	0	0	0
17	FW	(Brazil) BRA	Geison Moura	5	0	1+4	0	0	0	0	0
19	MF	(United States) USA	Shawn Chin	5	0	1+4	0	0	0	0	0
20	DF	(United States) USA	Connor Tobin	16	0	9+2	0	5	0	0	0
21	FW	(United States) USA	Devin Del Do	18	2	5+11	2	0+2	0	0	0
22	MF	(United States) USA	Kevin Venegas	23	2	15+5	1	0	0	3	1
23	MF	(United States) USA	Miguel Ibarra	31	5	23	3	5	1	3	1
24	MF	(United States) USA	Michael Reed	7	0	6+1	0	0	0	0	0
25	FW	(United States) USA	Nate Polak	7	1	3+3	1	0+1	0	0	0
26	FW	(United States) USA	Travis Wall	2	0	1+1	0	0	0	0	0
28	DF	(Cameroon) CMR	Ernest Tchoupe	11	1	9+2	1	0	0	0	0
30	GK	(United States) USA	Matt Van Oekel	33	0	25	0	5	0	3	0
32	MF	(United States) USA	Lucas Rodríguez	20	1	11+5	0	3+1	1	0	0
77	MF	(United States) USA	Andy Lorei	4	0	2+2	0	0	0	0	0
Players who left NSC Minnesota Stars during the season:

=== Goal scorers ===
Place	Position	Nation	Number	Name	NASL	NASL Playoffs	U.S. Open Cup	Total
1	FW	(Jamaica)	11	Amani Walker	7	2	0	9
2	FW	(Italy)	10	Simone Bracalello	5	1	2	8
3	FW	(Uruguay)	9	Martin Nuñez	5	1	0	6
4	MF	(United States)	23	Miguel Ibarra	3	1	1	5
5	MF	(United States)	4	Neil Hlavaty	2	0	1	3
6	MF	(Japan)	13	Kentaro Takada	2	0	0	2
6	FW	(United States)	21	Devin Del Do	2	0	0	2
6	MF	(United States)	22	Kevin Venegas	1	0	1	2
9	DF	(United States)	16	Kyle Altman	1	0	0	1
9	DF	(United States)	2	Justin Davis	1	0	0	1
9	DF	(Cameroon)	28	Ernest Tchoupe	1	0	0	1
9	DF	(Brazil)	3	Cristiano	1	0	0	1
9	FW	(United States)	25	Nate Polak	1	0	0	1
9	MF	(United States)	12	Jamie Watson	1	0	0	1
9	DF	(United States)	6	Kevin Friedland	1	0	0	1
9	MF	(Argentina)	32	Lucas Rodríguez	0	1	0	1
9				Own goal	0	1	0	1
TOTALS					34	7	5	46

=== Disciplinary record ===
Number	Nation	Position	Name	NASL		NASL Playoffs		U.S. Open Cup		Total	
Number	Nation	Position	Name	Yellow card	Red card	Yellow card	Red card	Yellow card	Red card	Yellow card	Red card
2	(United States)	DF	Justin Davis	7	0	2	0	1	0	3	0
3	(Brazil)	DF	Cristiano	1	0	0	0	0	1	0	1
4	(United States)	MF	Neil Hlavaty	3	0	1	0	0	0	1	0
6	(United States)	DF	Kevin Friedland	1	0	0	0	0	0	1	0
7	(United States)	FW	Fuad Ibrahim	1	0	0	0	0	0	1	0
9	(Uruguay)	FW	Martin Nuñez	4	0	0	0	0	0	1	0
10	(Italy)	FW	Simone Bracalello	2	0	2	0	0	0	2	0
13	(Japan)	MF	Kentaro Takada	4	0	1	0	0	0	1	0
14	(United States)	DF	Brian Kallman	4	0	0	0	1	0	1	0
15	(United States)	DF	Evan Sassano	1	0	0	0	0	0	1	0
16	(United States)	DF	Kyle Altman	2	1	1	0	1	0	2	0
20	(United States)	DF	Connor Tobin	3	0	0	0	0	0	1	0
21	(United States)	FW	Devin Del Do	1	0	0	0	0	0	1	0
22	(United States)	MF	Kevin Venegas	5	0	0	0	1	0	1	0
23	(United States)	MF	Miguel Ibarra	0	1	0	0	0	0	0	1
28	(Cameroon)	DF	Ernest Tchoupe	1	0	0	0	0	0	1	0
32	(Argentina)	MF	Lucas Rodríguez	1	0	0	0	0	0	1	0
			TOTALS	41	2	7	0	5	1	53	3
