= List of North American Soccer League transfers 2014 =

This is a list of North American Soccer League transfers and player moves during the 2014 season by club.

== Atlanta Silverbacks ==
In:

Out:

Note: Flags indicate national team as has been defined under FIFA eligibility rules. Players may hold more than one non-FIFA nationality.

No.	Pos.	Nation	Player

No.	Pos.	Nation	Player
—	MF	USA	Milton Blanco (to FC Edmonton)
—	MF	USA	Danny Barrera (to San Antonio Scorpions)
—	MF	BRA	Pedro Ferreira-Mendes (to Indy Eleven)
—	DF	USA	Mark Bloom (to (Canada) Toronto FC)

== Carolina RailHawks ==
In:

Out:

Note: Flags indicate national team as has been defined under FIFA eligibility rules. Players may hold more than one non-FIFA nationality.

No.	Pos.	Nation	Player

No.	Pos.	Nation	Player
—	FW	USA	Brian Shriver (to Tampa Bay Rowdies)

== FC Edmonton ==
In:

Out:

Note: Flags indicate national team as has been defined under FIFA eligibility rules. Players may hold more than one non-FIFA nationality.

No.	Pos.	Nation	Player
—	FW	CAN	Frank Jonke (from (Finland) FF Jaro)
—	GK	CAN	Tyson Farago (from (Canada) WSA Winnipeg)
—	MF	USA	Milton Blanco (from Atlanta Silverbacks)

No.	Pos.	Nation	Player
—	GK	CAN	Norbert Janas (Released)
—	DF	CAN	Chris de Guise (Released)
—	MF	CAN	Shaun Saiko (to San Antonio Scorpions)
—	MF	GUY	Chris Nurse (Released)
—	MF	NIR	Robert Garrett (back to (Northern Ireland) Linfield)
—	FW	CAN	Michael Cox (Released)
—	FW	CAN	Anthony Adur (Released)
—	FW	USA	Corey Hertzog (returning to (Canada) Vancouver Whitecaps FC)
—	DF	CAN	Antonio Rago (Released)
—	DF	SCO	David Proctor (Released)

== Fort Lauderdale Strikers ==
In:

Out:

Note: Flags indicate national team as has been defined under FIFA eligibility rules. Players may hold more than one non-FIFA nationality.

No.	Pos.	Nation	Player

No.	Pos.	Nation	Player
—	GK	MEX	Richard Sánchez (back to (United States) FC Dallas)
—	FW	USA	Bradlee Baladez (back to (United States) FC Dallas)

== Indy Eleven ==
In:

Out:

Note: Flags indicate national team as has been defined under FIFA eligibility rules. Players may hold more than one non-FIFA nationality.

No.	Pos.	Nation	Player
—	GK	GER	Kristian Nicht (from (United States) Rochester Rhinos)
—	GK	USA	Nathan Sprenkel (Free Agent)
—	DF	USA	Baba Omosegbon (Free Agent)
—	DF	HON	Erick Norales (from (Honduras) Marathón)
—	MF	BRA	Pedro Ferreira-Mendes (from Atlanta Silverbacks)
—	FW	JAM	Don Smart (from (United States) RVA Football Club)
—	MF	USA	Kyle Hyland (from (United States) Columbus Crew)
—	MF	USA	Chris Wey (Free Agent)
—	MF	HON	Walter Ramírez (from (United States) San Antonio Scorpions)

No.	Pos.	Nation	Player

== Minnesota United ==
Note: Flags indicate national team as has been defined under FIFA eligibility rules. Players may hold more than one non-FIFA nationality.

In:

Out:

No.	Pos.	Nation	Player
6	MF	CAN	Mozzi Gyorio (from (England) Fleetwood Town)
21	FW	USA	Christian Ramirez (from (United States) Charlotte Eagles)
5	DF	BRA	Tiago Calvano (from (Australia) Sydney FC)
77	MF	BRA	Juliano Vicentini (from (Brazil) Audax São Paulo Esporte Clube)
12	FW	USA	Jamie Watson (from (United States) Orlando City SC)
11	MF	AUS	Richard Garcia (from (Australia) Sydney FC)
—	MF	USA	Greg Jordan (from (United States) Philadelphia Union)
—	DF	USA	Tyler Polak (from (United States) New England Revolution)
—	DF	BRA	Daniel Mendes (loan from (Sweden) Kalmar FF)

No.	Pos.	Nation	Player
6	DF	USA	Kevin Friedland (Retired)
10	MF	USA	Mike Ambersley (to (United States) Indy Eleven)
5	DF	BIH	Edi Buro (Released)
15	MF	TRI	Sean de Silva (to (Trinidad and Tobago) Central FC)
11	FW	USA	Maxwell Griffin (Released)
19	DF	BRA	Luis Heitor-Piffer (Released)
32	MF	ARG	Lucas Rodríguez (Released)
33	GK	USA	Daryl Sattler (Released)
20	DF	USA	Connor Tobin (to (United States) Carolina RailHawks)
21	FW	USA	Travis Wall (Released)
28	MF	BIH	Siniša Ubiparipović (back to (Canada) Montreal Impact)
16	MF	SCO	Calum Mallace (back to (Canada) Montreal Impact)
91	MF	BRA	Geison Moura (to (Singapore) Hougang United)

== New York Cosmos ==
In:

Out:

Note: Flags indicate national team as has been defined under FIFA eligibility rules. Players may hold more than one non-FIFA nationality.

No.	Pos.	Nation	Player
—	FW	NED	Hans Denissen (from San Antonio Scorpions)

No.	Pos.	Nation	Player

== Ottawa Fury ==
In:

Out:

Note: Flags indicate national team as has been defined under FIFA eligibility rules. Players may hold more than one non-FIFA nationality.

No.	Pos.	Nation	Player
—	MF	SCO	Nicki Paterson (from (United States) Charleston Battery)
—	FW	BRA	Oliver Minatel (from (Brazil) Velo Clube)
—	FW	CAN	Carl Haworth (from Ottawa Fury PDL)
—	MF	IRL	Richie Ryan (from (Republic of Ireland) Shamrock Rovers)
—	DF	ESP	Ramón Soria (from (Norway) Gjøvik FF)
—	MF	CAN	Mauro Eustáquio (from (Portugal) Sporting Pombal)
—	DF	PLE	Omar Jarun (from (Belgium) Charleroi)

No.	Pos.	Nation	Player

== San Antonio Scorpions ==
In:

Out:

Note: Flags indicate national team as has been defined under FIFA eligibility rules. Players may hold more than one non-FIFA nationality.

No.	Pos.	Nation	Player
—	MF	CAN	Shaun Saiko (from FC Edmonton)
—	MF	USA	Danny Barrera (from Atlanta Silverbacks)
—	FW	DOM	Jonathan Faña (from (El Salvador) Alianza)

No.	Pos.	Nation	Player
—	DF	USA	Blake Wagner (to Tampa Bay Rowdies)
—	FW	NED	Hans Denissen (to New York Cosmos)

== Tampa Bay Rowdies ==
In:

Out:

Note: Flags indicate national team as has been defined under FIFA eligibility rules. Players may hold more than one non-FIFA nationality.

No.	Pos.	Nation	Player
—	DF	USA	Blake Wagner (from San Antonio Scorpions)
—	FW	USA	Brian Shriver (from Carolina RailHawks)
—	FW	ZIM	Lucky Mkosana (from (United States) Harrisburg City Islanders)

No.	Pos.	Nation	Player
—	DF	CAN	Andres Arango (Released)
—	FW	MLT	Etienne Barbara (Released)
—	MF	USA	Jamael Cox (Released)
—	FW	USA	Devin Del Do (Released)
—	DF	USA	Thurstan Johnson (Released)
—	DF	USA	Draymond Washington (Released)
—	MF	USA	Raphael Cox (Released)
—	GK	USA	Andrew Fontein (Released)
—	MF	ENG	Luke Mulholland (Released)
—	DF	USA	Daniel Scott (Released)
—	DF	JPN	Takuya Yamada (Released)
