= Miśkiewicz =

Miśkiewicz is a Polish surname. People with this surname include:

- Dorota Miśkiewicz (b. 1973), Polish singer
- Michał Miśkiewicz (b. 1989), Polish footballer
- Tomasz Miśkiewicz (b. 1977), Muslim religious leader in Poland

== See also ==
- Adam Mickiewicz, Polish-Lithuanian Romantic poet
- Michal Misiewicz, Polish-Canadian soccer player
