= Ilja van Leerdam =

Dutch footballer (born 1978)

Personal information
- Date of birth: 8 August 1978 (age 48)
- Place of birth: Eindhoven, Netherlands
- Height: 1.74 m (5 ft 9 in)
- Position: Midfielder

Youth career
- 1985–1990: Mifano
- 1990–1999: PSV

Senior career*
Years	Team	Apps	(Gls)
1999–2001	Helmond Sport	60	(16)
2001–2005	De Graafschap	118	(9)
2005–2006	FC Eindhoven	47	(5)
2007–2011	Helmond Sport	142	(14)
2011–2012	FC Edmonton	28	(1)
2012–2013	Lutlommel		
2013–2015	Herentals		
2015–2016	Gestel		
- * Club domestic league appearances and goals

Ilja van Leerdam (born 8 August 1978) is a Dutch former professional footballer who played as a midfielder.

== Early life ==
Van Leerdam was born in Eindhoven and grew up in the nearby village of Mierlo in North Brabant, where his parents ran the catering operation at the Sporthal de Weijer sports hall. He began playing football at the age of seven for the local amateur club Mifano, and at twelve was scouted into the youth academy of PSV. He was selected for the regional youth development side, the Brabants Elftal, and transferred from a MAVO in Mierlo to the Sint-Joriscollege in Eindhoven so that his schooling could be combined with the demands of a football career.

== Club career ==
=== Youth ===
By the late 1990s Van Leerdam had progressed to PSV's reserve side, where he trained alongside first-team players including Ronald Waterreus, Arthur Numan, Jaap Stam and Phillip Cocu. According to a later interview, manager Bobby Robson named him to the matchday squad for an away fixture at Fortuna Sittard when several first-team players were unavailable through injury, but he was an unused substitute and never made a senior appearance for PSV.

=== Helmond Sport ===
Van Leerdam left PSV in 1999 to join Eerste Divisie club Helmond Sport, where he made his professional debut on 13 August 1999 in a home match against Groningen. He spent two seasons with the club, later describing the second-tier game as more physical and man-oriented than what he had been used to at PSV.

=== De Graafschap ===
In June 2001, Van Leerdam signed a four-year contract with Eredivisie club De Graafschap. The move marked his first season in the top flight. De Graafschap were relegated at the end of the 2002–03 season, ending the club's eight-year stay in the top division; they returned to the Eredivisie via the promotion play-offs the following year. In a tense 2004–05 relegation battle, Van Leerdam scored in a 2–0 home win over Roda JC in January 2005 that briefly lifted the side off the bottom of the table.

=== FC Eindhoven ===
In May 2005, after De Graafschap had again been relegated, Van Leerdam was formally released by the club. He chose FC Eindhoven over a return to Helmond Sport, citing the Eindhoven club's partnership with PSV and the presence of his former coach Louis Coolen.

Van Leerdam joined the Eerste Divisie side for the 2005–06 season. He left FC Eindhoven the following summer and trialled with FC Den Bosch in October 2006, but manager Theo Bos declined to offer a contract, citing the club's financial position. He returned to FC Eindhoven later in October on an amateur basis, playing eleven league matches and scoring twice, but ended the arrangement in December 2006 in frustration at the club's failure to finalise a permanent contract.

=== Return to Helmond Sport ===
On 16 January 2007, Van Leerdam signed with Helmond Sport, completing the 2006–07 season on amateur terms before a two-year professional contract took effect on 1 July 2007. General manager Mario Captein, quoted in the Eindhovens Dagblad, described him as a "winner-type" with experience and coaching qualities the squad could draw on. He spent four-and-a-half seasons in this second spell at Helmond Sport, where he had begun his professional career.

=== FC Edmonton ===
In August 2011, Van Leerdam left the Netherlands to sign for Canadian club FC Edmonton, who had joined the North American Soccer League for that season. A meniscus injury at the end of the season required surgery in the Netherlands, and he later underwent a second knee operation in December 2012, rehabilitating at Helmond Sport.

=== Later career ===
Van Leerdam went on to play in the Belgian amateur leagues for Lutlommel VV and, from August 2013, for VC Herentals in the Vierde Klasse, the latter as cover for an injured player.

== Personal life ==
After his playing career Van Leerdam co-founded a youth football school in the Eindhoven region, Total Control, with former teammate Nyron Wau.

== Sources ==
- Van Bijsterveld, Vivianne (September 2013). "Ilja van Leerdam: profvoetballer van Mierlose bodem" [Ilja van Leerdam: professional footballer from Mierlo] (PDF). Mierlo Magazine (in Dutch). Autumn 2013 (3): 2–5.
