= Fabrice Lassonde =

Canadian soccer player (born 1989)

Fabrice Lassonde (born 18 February 1989) is a Canadian former soccer player who last played as a midfielder for FC Edmonton.

== Early life ==
Lassonde is a native of Mont-Saint-Grégoire, Canada, and played for Canadian sides Granby Cosmos, Lac Saint-Louis Lakers, and Trois-Rivières Attak as a youth player.

== Club career ==
Lassonde was regarded as a Canadian prospect. He signed for German 2. Bundesliga side Ingolstadt, but suffered an injury after almost being promoted to the first team of the club. After that, he trained with German sides KSV Hessen Kassel and SVN Zweibrücken. After that, he signed for NASL side FC Edmonton. Altogether, he made 8 appearances in the professional NASL.

== College career ==
Lassonde played for the team of the Université Laval, where he was expected to perform well immediately but was hindered by an injury; after recovering, he was regarded as one of the team's most important players, helping them win the league. However, he was later suspended due to breaching rules. He studied sports intervention during his university career.

== International career ==
Lassonde represented Canada internationally at youth level. After that, he played for the Quebec official soccer team alongside Canadian soccer player Alex Surprenant.

== Style of play ==
Lassonde mainly operated as an attacking midfielder.

== Managerial career ==
After retiring from professional football, Lassonde worked as a manager.

== Personal life ==
Lassonde can speak German, English, and French.
