= FC Fargo =

- Full name: FC Fargo North Dakota LLC
- Nickname: Mean Green
- Founded: 2015
- Dissolved: 2016
- Ground: Moorhead High School ,
- Capacity: 1,500
- Owner: Tim Singleton
- Head Coach: Tommy Nienhaus
- League: APL
- Website: http://fcfargo.com
Home colors	Away colors

FC Fargo was an American Semi-Professional soccer team based in Fargo, North Dakota. The team was sanctioned by the United States Adult Soccer Association (USASA) as a member of the American Premier League

== History ==
Founded in 2015 to give soccer players in Fargo-Moorhead and the Great Plains region a chance to play competitive soccer beyond their high school years and allow for younger athletes to progress to higher division teams.

The first head coach is Tommy Nienhaus, who is also head coach of the University of Jamestown Jimmies men's soccer program.

The team held its first open combine March 29, 2015.

FC Fargo began play in Summer of 2015 with an exhibition schedule. The team played at Sid Cichy Stadium at Shanley High School in Fargo, Lodoen Center in West Fargo and Moorhead High School in its inaugural, exhibition, season. Its inaugural match was against FC Minneapolis of the American Premier League at Moorhead High School on June 27, 2015.

On August 23, 2016 it was announced via Twitter that the team would cease operations due to financial issues.

== Club Culture ==
Supporters Group: The main supporters group for the club is the Fargo Green Army.

The club mascot is a Green Moose named "Meanie" after the Mean Green nickname.

== Players and Staff ==
=== First Team Players ===
as of 3 May 2015 Note: Flags indicate national team as defined under FIFA eligibility rules; some limited exceptions apply. Players may hold more than one non-FIFA nationality.

No.	Pos.	Nation	Player
1	GK	SRB	Habib Beljulji
2	GK	USA	Steve Harris
3	GK	USA	Dominic Palaty
4	GK	USA	Nicky Roberts
5	DF	NGA	Francis Agoro
6	DF	USA	Derek Dreher
7	DF	USA	Kody Duncan
8	DF	ENG	Ben Eastwell
9	DF	USA	Jace Nybo
11	DF	USA	Austin Peterson
12	DF	USA	Ben Prochniak
13	DF	BEN	JP Soglo
14	MF	ENG	George Anthony
15	MF	USA	Logan Christianson

No.	Pos.	Nation	Player
16	MF	FRA	Rolando Danho
17	MF	USA	Justin Froslie
18	MF	LBR	Amadu Myers
19	MF	KEN	Andy Mogga
20	MF	SSD	Faiz Musa
21	MF	USA	Nick Nguyen
22	MF	USA	Brady Rotert
23	FW	USA	Braden Axtman
11	FW	SRB	Emra Beljuli
17	FW	SRB	Sunaj Beljuli
26	FW	SSD	Mach Chuol
27	FW	USA	Jade Johnson
28	FW	USA	Miah Wills

=== Managers ===
- (United States) Tommy Nienhaus (2015)

== Season-by-season results ==
Year	Division	League	Reg. season	Open Cup
2015	USASA	None		Did not enter
2016	USASA	APL	Champions	Did not enter
