= Adam West (soccer) =

American soccer player

Personal information
- Full name: Thomas Adam West
- Date of birth: May 7, 1986 (age 40)
- Place of birth: Gig Harbor, Washington, United States
- Height: 6 ft 1 in (1.85 m)
- Position: Defender

Youth career
- 2001–2004: Bellarmine Preparatory School

College career
| Years | Team | Apps | (Gls) |
| 2004–2006 | Washington Huskies | | |

Senior career*
| Years | Team | Apps | (Gls) |
| 2007–2008 | Seattle Sounders | 29 | (0) |
| 2007–2008 | Milwaukee Wave (indoor) | 13 | (0) |
| 2009 | Tacoma Tide | 16 | (1) |
| 2010 | Rochester Rhinos | 10 | (1) |
| 2011 | Fort Lauderdale Strikers | 15 | (0) |
| 2012 | FC Edmonton | 10 | (0) |
| 2013–2014 | Seattle Sounders FC U-23 | 2 | (0) |
| 2014–2016 | Tacoma Stars (indoor) | 20 | (15) |
| 2015 | Louisville City | 13 | (0) |
| 2016 | Arizona United | 12 | (0) |
| 2018–2022 | Tacoma Stars (indoor) | 23 | (12) |
- * Club domestic league appearances and goals as of 15 December 2022

Thomas Adam West (born May 7, 1986) is an American soccer player who last played for the Tacoma Stars in the Major Arena Soccer League.

== Career ==
=== Youth and college ===
West attended Bellarmine Preparatory School where he played on the 2004 Washington State championship soccer team (voted National Champions). He was All State that season. In 2004, he entered the University of Washington, playing on the Huskies soccer team for two seasons.

=== Professional ===
In the spring of 2007, West tried out for the Seattle Sounders of the USL First Division, who offered him a contract in April. West won the 2007 USL First Division championship with the Sounders, and played in 29 games during his two years with the club.

In the fall of 2007, West also played with the Milwaukee Wave of the Major Indoor Soccer League.

Seattle Sounders FC released West before the inaugural season. Having been unable to secure a professional contract, he subsequently signed with Tacoma Tide of the USL Premier Development League for the 2009 season.

West signed with USSF Division 2 club Rochester Rhinos on February 16, 2010, where the Rhinos won the regular season title. He then signed with Fort Lauderdale Strikers of the North American Soccer League on February 24, 2011, where the Strikers made it to the NASL championship game, but fell short in the final leg. He left the club after the conclusion of the 2011 season.

In 2012 West joined with the newly promoted club, FC Edmonton of the NASL. Becoming the regular at left back by the season's start, injuries held West back to only 10 appearances for the year. The team struggled in the absence of West finishing at the bottom of the table for the year. In 2013, West played in his hometown with the Seattle Sounders FC U-23 in the PDL. Two games into the season West suffered a torn acl and missed the rest of the season.

West signed with USL expansion side Louisville City FC on January 13, 2015. He joined Arizona United SC on June 23, 2016.

== Honors ==
=== Seattle Sounders ===
- USL First Division Commissioner's Cup (1): 2007
- USL First Division Championship (1): 2007

=== Rochester Rhinos ===
- USSF Division 2 Pro League Regular Season Champions (1): 2010
