= Kenny Caceros =

Canadian soccer player

Personal information
- Full name: Kenneth Caceros
- Date of birth: 6 April 1988 (age 38)
- Place of birth: Nepean, Ontario, Canada
- Height: 1.83 m (6 ft 0 in)
- Positions: Midfielder; fullback

Team information
- Current team: Gloucester Celtic
- Number: 6

Youth career
- 2006–2009: Syracuse Orange

Senior career*
| Years | Team | Apps | (Gls) |
| 2008–2010 | Ottawa Fury (PDL) | 33 | (3) |
| 2011 | Capital City | | |
| 2012 | FC Edmonton | 24 | (0) |
| 2013 | Harrisburg City Islanders | 5 | (0) |
| 2013 | Kingston | | |
| 2014 | Ottawa Fury | 9 | (0) |
| 2015– | Gloucester Celtic | | |
- * Club domestic league appearances and goals as of October 8, 2016

Kenneth Caceros (born April 6, 1988) is a Canadian soccer player who plays for Gloucester Celtic.

== Early life ==
Caceros was born in Ottawa to a Guatemalan father. He played for the Ottawa Fury's Super Y-League club as a teenager, earning a scholarship to Syracuse University. He played for the Orange for four years before returning to Ottawa to play for the Fury's PDL club, where he played three seasons.

== Club career ==
Caceros began his professional career with Capital City F.C., based in his hometown of Ottawa, in their inaugural season in the Canadian Soccer League. He played a key role in a team that included many of his former Ottawa Fury youth teammates, and helped the club to a 3rd-place league finish and a trip to the playoff final.

In March, 2012 he was signed by FC Edmonton of the NASL. He played in 24 of Edmonton's 28 NASL matches in the 2012 season, as well as one Canadian Championship match. In 2013, Caceros split his time between the Harrisburg City Islanders of the USL Pro league and Kingston FC of the Canadian Soccer League, helping to guide Kingston FC to the 2013 CSL league championship.

Had a trial with the New York Cosmos of the NASL.
