= Jonathan Joseph-Augustin =

French footballer (born 1981)

Personal information
- Full name: Jonathan Joseph-Augustin
- Date of birth: 13 May 1981 (age 45)
- Place of birth: Tremblay-en-France, France
- Height: 1.84 m (6 ft 0 in)
- Position: Defender

Youth career
- 1997–1999: Guingamp

Senior career*
Years	Team	Apps	(Gls)
1999–2004	Guingamp	15	(0)
2003–2004	→ Grenoble (loan)	36	(1)
2004–2005	Chamois Niortais	33	(1)
2005–2007	Beveren	52	(3)
2007	Roeselare	14	(1)
2008	Rot-Weiß Essen	15	(0)
2010–2011	AS Moulins		
2012	FC Edmonton	14	(0)

International career
2001	France U20	1	(0)
- * Club domestic league appearances and goals as of 28 September 2012

Jonathan "Jo" Joseph-Augustin (born 13 May 1981) is a French footballer who most recently played for FC Edmonton in the North American Soccer League.

== Club career ==
He started his career at Guingamp in Ligue 1, and then to Grenoble and Niort in Ligue 2. In summer 2005, he followed this coach on Niort, Vincent Dufour, to join Beveren of Belgian League on three contract. On 2006–07 season, he became the team captain.

Joseph-Augustin signed with FC Edmonton of the North American Soccer League on 24 February 2012.

== International career ==
He was part of the French squad at 2001 FIFA World Youth Championship.
