= Michał Misiewicz =

Canadian former soccer player (born 1990)

Personal information
- Full name: Michał Jerzy Misiewicz
- Date of birth: October 11, 1990 (age 36)
- Place of birth: Athens, Greece
- Height: 1.87 m (6 ft 2 in)
- Position: Goalkeeper

Youth career
- 2005–2006: Jahn Regensburg
- 2006–2007: Śląsk Wrocław
- 2007–2008: Plymouth Argyle
- 2008–2009: Sunderland

Senior career*
Years	Team	Apps	(Gls)
2009–2010	Sunderland	0	(0)
2010–2012	Polonia Bytom	1	(0)
2012	FC Edmonton	4	(0)
2013	Świt Nowy Dwór Mazowiecki	0	(0)
2013–2014	Blyth Spartans	21	(0)

International career
2006	Canada U17	5	(0)
2008–2009	Canada U20	7	(0)
2012	Canada U23	7	(0)
- * Club domestic league appearances and goals

Michał Jerzy Misiewicz (born October 11, 1990) is a Canadian former professional soccer player. He has represented Canada at under-17, under-20 and under-23 level. Michal now coaches goalkeepers in Calgary, AB, Canada and runs his own goalkeeping academy.

== Early life and career ==
Misiewicz was born in the Greek capital of Athens to Polish parents, and then the family moved to Alberta in Canada. Misiewicz left his home at the age of 14 to pursue a career in Europe and spent a year in Germany with SSV Jahn Regensburg. He moved to Polish club Śląsk Wrocław in 2006 and six months later travelled to England with his coach, who had received a job offer there. Misiewicz had a successful trial with Football League Championship club Plymouth Argyle during the spring of 2007 and signed a two-year apprenticeship in June. Under the guidance of Rhys Wilmot, he helped the club's under-18 side reach the quarter-finals of the FA Youth Cup and win the South West Conference of the Football League Youth Alliance during the 2007–08 season. Misiewicz joined Premier League side Sunderland in the summer of 2008 and won Group D of the Premier Academy League in his first season with the club. He signed a one-year professional contract in 2009, and spent a season playing for the club's reserve team. He was released at the end of the 2009–10 campaign.

== Club career ==
=== Polonia Bytom ===
In July 2010, he signed a three-year contract with Polonia Bytom.

=== FC Edmonton ===
In March 2012, Misiewicz joined North American Soccer League club FC Edmonton.

=== Blyth Spartans ===
Misiewicz joined Blyth Spartans for the 2013 season following solid performances in a set of pre-season friendlies. He made his competitive debut at Witton Albion and saved a first half penalty to contribute to a 1–0 victory with the Spartans down to 9 men.

== International career ==
Misiewicz was a member of the Canadian U-17, U-20 and U-23 (Olympic team) national teams.

He has also represented Alberta numerous times during Provincial and Canadian National Championships and was successful winning the U-13 Championships in the 2003 season with Southern Alberta, coming in 4th at the National Championships with the U-14 Alberta team in 2004 and winning the U-16 National Championship with team Alberta for the 2006 title and even scoring in the final game with a confident penalty shot.

Misiewicz was given the starting keeping position with the Canada U23 team during the 2012 CONCACAF Men's Olympic Qualifying Tournament. He played in all four matches, including a 2–0 win over the United States in the group stage and was named MVP against El Salvador in a 0–0 draw, however Canada failed to qualify.
