= Luis Heitor-Piffer =

Brazilian footballer

Personal information
- Date of birth: 17 November 1988 (age 37)
- Place of birth: Amparo, Brazil
- Height: 1.83 m (6 ft 0 in)
- Position: Defender

Youth career
- 2010–2012: Grand View Vikings

Senior career*
| Years | Team | Apps | (Gls) |
| 2010–2012 | Des Moines Menace | 29 | (4) |
| 2013 | Minnesota United | 1 | (0) |
- * Club domestic league appearances and goals as of 5 January 2014

Luis Heitor-Piffer (born 17 November 1988) is a Brazilian professional footballer who last played as a defender for Minnesota United FC in the North American Soccer League.

== Career ==
=== Early career ===
Born in Amparo in Brazil, Piffer played for two seasons at the Grand View University for the Grand View Vikings soccer team. During his two seasons with Grand View scored 22 goals and won two Midwest Collegiate Conference’s Player of the Year honors.

=== Minnesota United ===
On April 19, 2013 it was announced that Piffer had signed with Minnesota United FC of the North American Soccer League. He then made his professional debut for the club on June 1, 2013 against the San Antonio Scorpions. He came on as a 70th-minute substitute for Kentaro Takada as United lost 2–0.

He then had his contract option declined by Minnesota United on December 3, 2013.

== Career statistics ==
As of 5 January 2014

| Club | Season | League | | | League Cup | | US Open Cup | | North America | | Total | |
| Club | Season | Division | Apps | Goals | Apps | Goals | Apps | Goals | Apps | Goals | Apps | Goals |
|---|---|---|---|---|---|---|---|---|---|---|---|---|
| Minnesota United | 2013 | NASL | 1 | 0 | 0 | 0 | 0 | 0 | — | — | 1 | 0 |
| Career total | | | 1 | 0 | 0 | 0 | 0 | 0 | 0 | 0 | 1 | 0 |
