= Ernest Tchoupe =

Cameroonian footballer (born 1987)

Personal information
- Full name: Mba Ernest Tchoupe Ndefotsing
- Date of birth: 23 December 1987 (age 38)
- Place of birth: Yaoundé, Cameroon
- Height: 6 ft 2 in (1.88 m)
- Position: Defender

Senior career*
Years	Team	Apps	(Gls)
?–2006	Les Astres		
2006–2008	Coton Sport		
2008	Girardot		
2009	Alianza Petrolera		
2010–2011	Expreso Rojo		
2012–2013	Minnesota Stars	11	(1)
2013–2014	Les Astres		
2016	Fargo		
2017	CS St-Hubert	12	(0)
2018	CS Fabrose	2	(0)
- * Club domestic league appearances and goals

Mba Ernest Tchoupe Ndefotsing (born 22 November 1987) is a Cameroonian former professional footballer who played as a defender.

== Career ==
Tchoupe began his career with Les Astres FC in Cameroon.

He signed with Coton Sport in 2006, where he won a championship in his debut season. The signing came with some controversy as he signed with the team while still under contract with Les Astres FC. Consequently, he was suspended for a year due to the improper signing procedure.

In 2008, he left his native Cameroon and moved to Colombia in Bogota as well as its inner suburbs, where he played for five years. He played three seasons in Categoría Primera B, the second division of Colombian soccer, seeing time in 2008 with Girardot FC, in 2009 with Alianza Petrolera and in 2010 with Expreso Rojo.

Ernest joined Minnesota Stars FC of the North American Soccer League in 2012. He made his debut on 5 May against the Atlanta Silverbacks as a substitute in the 22nd minute, scoring a goal two minutes later in the 24th minute. He returned to the team for the 2013 season.

In 2016, he joined FC Fargo in the amateur United States Adult Soccer Association.

In 2017, he joined CS St-Hubert of the Première Ligue de soccer du Québec. The following year, he moved to another PLSQ club, CS Fabrose. He was named one of the Players of the Week in the third week of the 2018 season. In 2021, he played two matches with CS Longueuil's reserve side in the PLSQ reserve division.
