= Travis Wall (soccer) =

American soccer player

Personal information
- Height: 6 ft 0 in (1.83 m)
- Position: Forward

Team information
- Current team: Minnesota United FC
- Number: 21

Youth career
- 2008–2011: Ohio Wesleyan Battling Bishops
- 2010–2011: Columbus Crew

Senior career*
Years	Team	Apps	(Gls)
2012–2013	Minnesota United FC	9	(0)
- * Club domestic league appearances and goals as of September 30, 2012

Travis Wall is an American soccer player. He last played for Minnesota United FC in the North American Soccer League.

== Career ==
Wall played his college soccer at the Ohio Wesleyan University between 2008 and 2011, before signing his first professional contract with Minnesota Stars FC on April 4, 2012. At Ohio Wesleyan he was a two-time 1st team All-American in 2010 and 2011. In 2011, he helped lead Ohio Wesleyan to the National Championship while also being named the National Player of the Year.
