= Amani Walker =

Jamaican footballer (born 1989)

Personal information
- Full name: Amani Walker
- Date of birth: 16 December 1989 (age 36)
- Place of birth: San Diego, California, United States
- Height: 6 ft 2 in (1.88 m)
- Position: Forward

Team information
- Current team: ASC San Diego

Youth career
- 2007–2010: UC Irvine Anteaters

Senior career*
| Years | Team | Apps | (Gls) |
| 2010 | Orange County Blue Star | 16 | (12) |
| 2011–2012 | Minnesota Stars FC | 40 | (8) |
| 2013–2014 | Tampa Bay Rowdies | 17 | (4) |
| 2015 | Orange County Blues | 12 | (1) |
| 2017 | ASC San Diego | 24 | (28) |

International career
| 2009 | Jamaica U20 | 1 | (0) |
- * Club domestic league appearances and goals as of 19 August 2018

Amani Walker (born 16 December 1989) is a Jamaican footballer.

== Career ==
=== College and amateur ===
Walker attended Francis Parker High School, and played for the Surf FC club team, before going on to play four years of college soccer at the University of California, Irvine. He was named to the All-Big West first team and led his team in goals as a junior in 2009, while as a senior in 2010 he was named to the NSCAA All-Far West Region first team and the All-Big West first-team, was the Big West Co-Offensive Player of the Year, and was voted as one of TopDrawerSoccer.com Top 20 Players to Watch. He finished his college career as UCI's all-time leader in games played with 85, scoring 27 goals in the process.

During his college years Walker also played with Orange County Blue Star in the USL Premier Development League, scoring 12 goals in 16 games for the team in 2010.

=== Professional ===
Walker was invited to the 2011 adidas Major League Soccer Combine, and was subsequently drafted with the 9th overall pick of the 2011 MLS Supplemental Draft by Chicago Fire, but was not offered a contract by the team.

He subsequently signed his first professional contract when he was signed by the NSC Minnesota Stars of the North American Soccer League. He made his professional debut on 7 May 2011, coming on as a substitute in a 1–1 tie with the Fort Lauderdale Strikers. Walker started his 2012 season with several strong performances.

=== International ===
In March 2009, Walker made an appearance for the Jamaica U-20 national team versus Canada in Fort Lauderdale, Florida. He is eligible to play for Jamaica through his Jamaican-born father.

== Honors ==
=== NSC Minnesota Stars ===
- North American Soccer League Championship (1): 2011
