= Bryan Arguez =

American soccer player (born 1989)

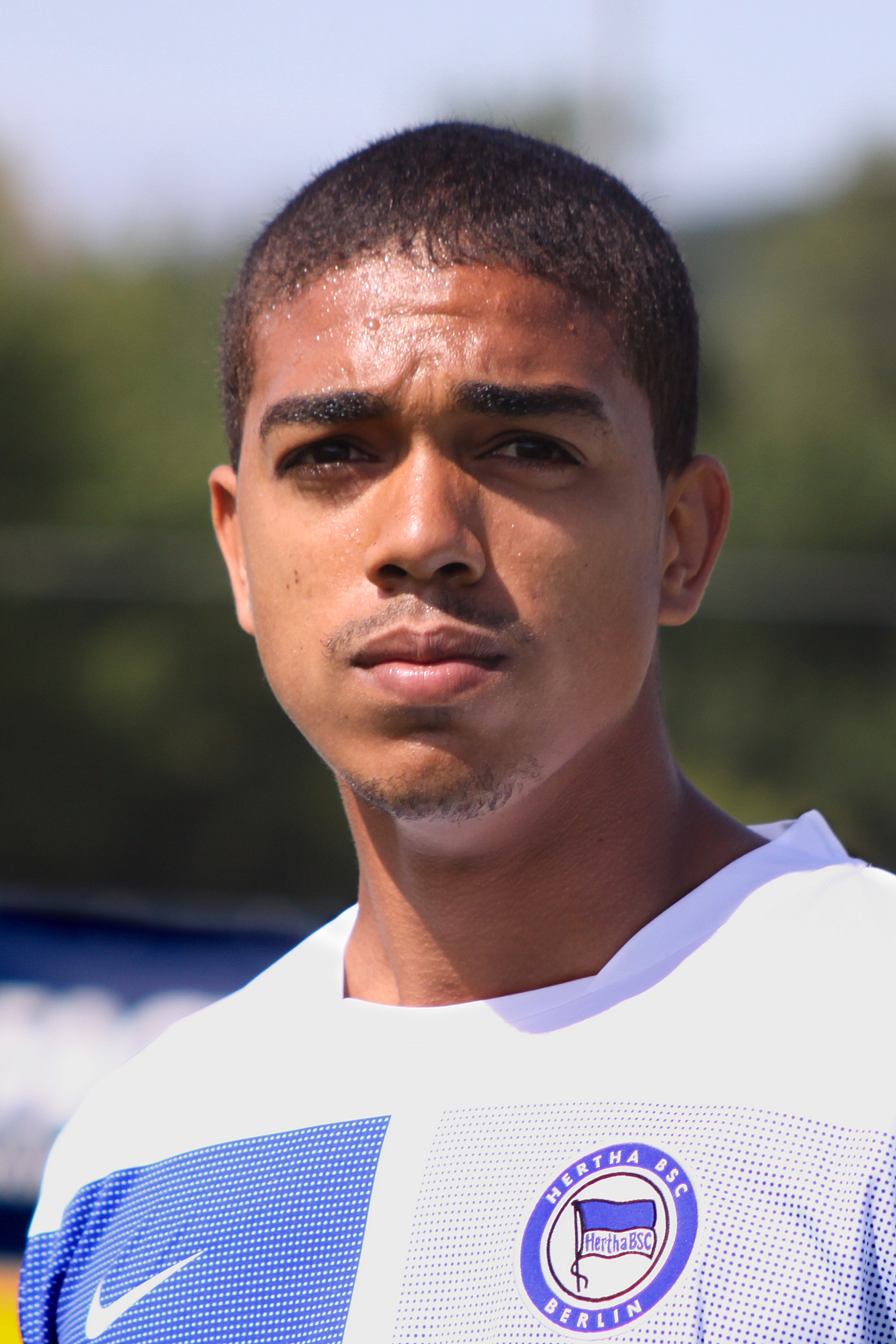
- Arguez with Hertha BSC in 2009

Personal information
- Full name: Bryan Joshua Arguez
- Date of birth: January 13, 1989 (age 37)
- Place of birth: Miami, Florida, United States
- Height: 6 ft 2 in (1.88 m)
- Position: Defensive midfielder

Youth career
- 2006: IMG Academy

Senior career*
Years	Team	Apps	(Gls)
2007	D.C. United	0	(0)
2008–2009	Hertha BSC II	10	(0)
2008–2009	Hertha BSC	1	(0)
2010	Miami FC	7	(0)
2010	→ Estoril Praia (loan)	0	(0)
2011	Fort Lauderdale Strikers	19	(1)
2012	Montreal Impact	0	(0)
2012	→ FC Edmonton (loan)	13	(1)
2013	Minnesota United	5	(0)
2013	Carolina RailHawks	2	(0)
2014	Miami Dade FC		
2015	FC Miami City	1	(0)
2016	Miami FC	0	(0)
2016	Fort Lauderdale Strikers	14	(0)
2017	Pittsburgh Riverhounds	0	(0)
2018	FC Golden State Force	1	(0)
2019	Las Vegas Lights	4	(0)
2019	Orange County FC	3	(0)

International career^{‡}
2005–2006	United States U17	27	(1)
2006–2009	United States U20	15	(1)
2008	United States U23	2	(0)
- * Club domestic league appearances and goals as of October 1, 2019 ‡ National team caps and goals as of June 30, 2012

Bryan Joshua Arguez (born January 13, 1989) is an American former professional soccer player. He has represented the United States national team at all youth levels including the Olympic team.

== Career ==
=== Club ===
Arguez was selected by D.C. United in the first round (eleventh overall) of the 2007 MLS SuperDraft. However, he never made a first-team appearance for the club. Arguez signed with Hertha BSC of the German Bundesliga on January 25, 2008, for a fee of €200,000, having never played a competitive match for D.C. United. Arguez made his lone league appearance on February 2, 2008, against Eintracht Frankfurt

On August 3, 2009, Arguez was brought in for a trial by Belgian club Charleroi. Later that month, he turned down an offer from FSV Frankfurt. After two years and only one Bundesliga match, he was released by Hertha BSC in December 2009. After his release, Arguez was invited to train with Brazilian team Flamengo.

Arguez signed with Miami FC in the USSF Division 2 Professional League in January 2010, and was immediately sent on loan by his parent company, Traffic Sports, to Estoril Praia, but he returned to the United States in April, having never made a first team appearance for the Portuguese club. He subsequently played seven games for Miami, but was released by the team mid-season.

On February 22, 2011, Arguez was re-signed by the NASL club, now called Fort Lauderdale Strikers. After a successful season with Fort Lauderdale, Arguez was signed by Major League Soccer expansion side Montreal Impact on November 25, 2011.

Arguez was loaned to NASL club FC Edmonton for the remainder of the 2012 season on July 9, 2012. On September 27, Arguez was called back to Montreal after an impressive run at Edmonton in such a short time, having scored a goal and assist while becoming defensive MVP of the NASL during the week.

Montreal announced in December 2012 that Arguez would not return for the 2013 season. Arguez signed for NASL club Minnesota United FC in early 2013.

Arguez was acquired by the Carolina RailHawks in July 2013 but was released less than two weeks later following allegations of rape in Georgia, which he was fully acquitted of on March 31, 2016.

On July 5, 2014, Arquez signed with Miami Dade FC.

On April 30, 2015, Bryan signed with the Premier Development League club FC Miami City Champions for the 2015–16 season.

After a short stint with NASL side Miami FC, Arguez signed with Fort Lauderdale Strikers on June 27, 2016.

Arguez moved again on December 15, 2016, when he signed with United Soccer League side Pittsburgh Riverhounds. He was released by the Riverhounds during the preseason, without playing a competitive first-team match.

After spells in the semi-professional leagues, Arguez returned to the USL Championship with Las Vegas Lights for their 2019 season.

=== International ===
Arguez started his U.S. international career with the U-17 men's team, collecting twenty-seven caps and one goal. He has also appeared for the U-20 U.S. Team, with whom he has earned five caps, including three starts. He was named to the U.S. roster for the 2007 FIFA U-20 World Cup in Canada, but did not make an appearance. Arguez then appeared twice for the U-23 U.S. team in 2008, both at the 2008 Toulon Tournament, but he was not named to the roster for the 2008 Summer Olympics.

On September 29, 2009, at the FIFA U-20 World Cup in Egypt, Arguez scored for the United States U-20 squad against Cameroon giving the Americans the first goal in what would go on to be a 4–1 victory.
