= Edi Buro =

Bosnian soccer player

Personal information
- Full name: Edi Buro
- Date of birth: September 19, 1987 (age 39)
- Place of birth: Zenica, Bosnia and Herzegovina
- Height: 6 ft 2 in (1.88 m)
- Positions: Defender; defensive midfielder

Youth career
- 1995–2004: NK Celik

Senior career*
Years	Team	Apps	(Gls)
2007–2008	Minnesota Thunder	??	(??)
2009–2011	FK Buducnost	??	(??)
2011–2012	NK Travnik	??	(??)
2012–2016	Minnesota United	??	(??)
- * Club domestic league appearances and goals as of March 7, 2013

Edi Buro is a Bosnian-American soccer executive, sporting director, and former professional player. He serves as the Sporting Director of Manitou FC, a youth soccer club based in Minnesota.

== Playing career ==
Buro played professional and high-level club soccer prior to transitioning into coaching and administration. His playing career included stints with FK Budućnost and NK Travnik in Bosnia and Herzegovina, which compete in the Bosnian Premier League system.

He later played in the United States with Minnesota United during the club’s participation in the North American Soccer League (NASL).

== Coaching and administrative career ==
After concluding his playing career, Buro moved into coaching and soccer administration. He later assumed the role of Sporting Director at Manitou FC, where he oversees the club’s technical direction, player development structure, coaching education, and soccer operations.

During his tenure, Manitou FC expanded its programming and competitive participation, supporting player development from early youth stages through academy age groups (U8–U19). The club fields teams in the MLS NEXT Academy Division (boys) and the ECNL Regional League (girls).

Teams within the club’s structure have won state-level competitions and participated in national tournaments, with players advancing to collegiate soccer programs and other development environments.

== Development approach ==
Buro’s work has focused on long-term player development, emphasizing age-appropriate training models, technical skill development, and alignment between team objectives and individual player growth.

== Licenses and certifications ==
Buro holds multiple coaching and leadership credentials, including:

- USSF B License
- USSF C License
- USSF National Youth License
- Coach Developer Diploma
- Club Technical Leadership Diploma
- U.S. Soccer 4v4, 7v7, 9v9, and 11v11 certifications

== Community involvement ==
From 2014 to 2016, Buro served as an Ambassador for The Sanneh Foundation, contributing to youth soccer and community-based initiatives.
