= Sipho Sibiya =

South African-Canadian soccer player

Personal information
- Full name: Sipho Sibiya Riopel
- Date of birth: 28 July 1971 (age 55)
- Place of birth: Pretoria, South Africa
- Height: 5 ft 10 in (1.78 m)
- Positions: Midfielder; forward

College career
Years	Team	Apps	(Gls)
1991	Seattle Pacific Falcons		

Senior career*
Years	Team	Apps	(Gls)
1994–1997	Vancouver 86ers		
1996–2000	Edmonton Drillers (indoor)	144	(97)
1998	Montreal Impact	19	(3)
2000–2003	Milwaukee Wave (indoor)	86	(51)
2003–2004	St. Louis Steamers (indoor)	25	(16)
2004	Edmonton Aviators	20	(2)
2004–2005	Cleveland Force (indoor)	30	(13)
2005	Baltimore Blast (indoor)	8	(2)
2007	Winnipeg Alliance (indoor)		
2008–2009	Saskatoon Accelerators (indoor)	2	(0)
2009–2010	Prince George Fury (indoor)	6	(8)

International career
2004	Canada (futsal)	2	(0)
2006–2010	Canada (beach)	11	(8)

Managerial career
- 2006: Canada (beach) (assistant)
- 2008–2008: Saskatoon Accelerators
- 2009–2010: Prince George Fury
- 2011: Vancouver Whitecaps (women) (assistant)
- * Club domestic league appearances and goals

Sipho Sibiya Riopel (born 28 July 1971), also known as Siphos Sibya, is a retired soccer player who is an assistant coach with the Vancouver Whitecaps women's team. Born in South Africa, he represented Canada at international level in futsal and beach soccer.

== Player ==
=== Youth ===
In 1991, Sibiya, at the time known as Sipho Riopel, played a single season for Seattle Pacific University.

=== Professional ===
In 1994, Sibiya began his professional career with the Vancouver 86ers of the American Professional Soccer League. He played four seasons in Vancouver. In 1998, he played a single season with the Montreal Impact of the USISL A-League. In December 1998, he tore his achilles tendon playing indoor soccer. The injury kept him from playing outdoors in 1999. In 1996, Sibiya began playing winter indoor soccer with the expansion Edmonton Drillers of the National Professional Soccer League. Sibiya played all four plus seasons of the team's existence. The Drillers began the 2000–2001 season, but folded after nine games. On 4 December 2001, the Milwaukee Wave selected Subiya in the first round of the dispersal draft. He played three seasons with the Wave. On August 38, 2003, the Wave traded Sibiya and future considerations to the Cleveland Force for Giuliano Oliviero. The Force then traded Sibiya and D.J. Newsom to the St. Louis Steamers for Ato Leone. In June 2004, Sibiya was again part of a complicated three team trade. The Steamers traded Siphiya to the Milwaukee Wave for Joe Reiniger. The Wave then traded Siphiya, Gary DePalma and future considerations to the Cleveland Force in exchange for Lee Edgerton. While this was taking place, Sibiya was playing for the Edmonton Aviators of the USL A-League. On 29 March 2005, the Force traded Sibiya and Joel John Bailey to the Baltimore Blast for Neil Gilbert and Allen Eller. On 21 March 2007, Sibiya signed with the Winnipeg Alliance of the Canadian Major Indoor Soccer League. In 2008, Sibiya became a player-coach for the Saskatoon Accelerators of the Professional Arena Soccer League. In 2009, he became a player-coach with the Prince George Fury of the Professional Arena Soccer League.

=== National team ===
Sibiya played for the Canada national beach soccer team which went to the quarterfinals of the 2006 FIFA Beach Soccer World Cup.

== Coach ==
Sibiya has held numerous coaching positions, including assistant coach to the 2006 Canada national beach soccer team and head coach of the Saskatoon Accelerators and Prince George Fury. He is an assistant coach with the Vancouver Whitecaps women's team. From September 2009 to November 2011, he served as Technical Director for the Guildford Athletic Club in Surrey, British Columbia.
