= 2010 Canadian Major Indoor Soccer League season =

The 2010 Canadian Major Indoor Soccer League (CMISL) season saw the reactivation of the Winnipeg Alliance FC and the expansion of the Prince George Fury. Each team played four games against teams from the Professional Arena Soccer League (PASL) in the United States. The season consisted of twelve soccer games total. The Edmonton Drillers, Saskatoon Accelerators, Prince George Fury and Winnipeg Alliance FC played six home games and the Calgary United FC played seven due to playing American teams.

== Teams ==
Team	City	Established	Home Arena	Notes
Calgary United FC	Calgary, Alberta	2007	Calgary Soccer Centre	
Edmonton Drillers	Edmonton, Alberta	2007	Edmonton South Soccer Centre	
Saskatoon Accelerators	Saskatoon, Saskatchewan	2007	Henk Ruys Soccer Centre	
Winnipeg Alliance FC	Winnipeg, Manitoba	2007	Garden City Soccer Complex/MTS Centre (for 2 games)	Reactivated
Prince George Fury	Prince George, British Columbia	2009	CN Centre	New Expansion Team

== Standings ==
Pos	Team	Pld	W	L	GF	GA	GD	Pts
1	Calgary United FC	12	10	2	79	32	+47	20
2	Saskatoon Accelerators	12	9	3	69	53	+16	18
3	Edmonton Drillers	12	5	7	84	72	+12	10
4	Prince George Fury	12	3	9	84	97	−13	6
5	Winnipeg Alliance	12	3	9	59	85	−26	6
