= Munib Koric =

Bosnian footballer (born 1967)

Munib Korić
Personal information
- Date of birth: 25 January 1967 (age 59)
- Place of birth: Višegrad, Bosnia and Herzegovina
- Height: 1.80 m (5 ft 11 in)
- Position: Midfielder

Team information
- Current team: Calgary Villains FC (head coach)

Youth career
- 1973–1982: FK Drina Višegrad

Senior career*
Years	Team	Apps	(Gls)
1983–1985	FK Drina Višegrad		
1985–1987	FK Radnički Gorazde		
1988–1990	NK Istra 1961		
1991–1992	Haunstetten		
1993–1996	Bubesheim		
1996–1998	NK Croatia		
1998–1999	Lerchenauer See		

International career
1985	Yugoslavia U18		

Managerial career
- 1997–1998: NK Croatia
- 1999: Lerchenauer See
- 1999–2002: Calgary FC Celtic
- 2002–: Calgary Villains FC
- 2012: Calgary United F.C.
- * Club domestic league appearances and goals

Munib Korić (born 25 January 1967) is a Bosnian former professional footballer and the head coach of Calgary Villains FC in the Alberta Premier League. He has served as the club's technical director since September 2002, making him the longest-tenured technical director at a single soccer club in Calgary. Primarily a midfielder, he played professionally for various clubs in Bosnia and Herzegovina, Croatia, and Germany. Korić is the founder of the Golden Goal Soccer Academy based in Calgary.

== Club career ==
Korić progressed through the youth system of FK Drina in Višegrad from 1973 to 1982, and remained with the senior team until 1985, making his debut at the age of 16 in 1983. In 1984, he attracted attention from FK Partizan, FK Sloboda Užice, and FK FAP Priboj, but an ankle injury prevented a move to any of these clubs. In 1985, Korić also attracted significant interest from FC Prishtina, then managed by Miroslav Blažević, but ultimately joined FK Radnički in Goražde, where he played from 1985 to 1987. From 1987 to 1988, Korić temporarily stepped away from football to complete his mandatory military service in the Yugoslav People's Army. Upon finishing his service, he was offered a contract by NK GOŠK-Dubrovnik 1919, but he instead signed for Croatian Football League side NK Istra 1961 where he played until 1990. During his time in Pula, he again attracted significant interest from clubs including Sarıyer S.K., FK Napredak Kruševac, FK Sloboda Tuzla, NK Čelik Zenica and several Allsvenskan sides, but he declined these offers and remained with NK Istra 1961.

After leaving Croatia, Korić continued his career in Germany, where he played for FC Haunstetten in Augsburg from 1991 to 1992, and SC Bubesheim in Günzburg from 1993 to 1996, bringing his experience and versatility to both teams. Known for his technical skill, leadership, and tactical awareness, Korić became a respected figure on and off the field throughout Bavaria. From 1996 to 1998 Koric played for NK Croatia in Munich. He was appointed as Player-coach in 1997, being crowned Bavarian Provincial Champion during the 1997-1998 season. He concluded his career with SC Lerchenauer See where he played from 1998 to 1999, again being appointed as Player-coach in 1999.

== Coaching career ==
=== Calgary FC Celtic (1999–2002) ===
Korić's early career in Canada began after his arrival in 1999. Shortly after settling in Calgary, Korić was appointed head coach of the Calgary FC Celtic U17 team for the 1999–2000 season, achieving immediate success by leading the team to the Alberta Provincial Championship title. In the following 2000–2001 season, he took charge of the Celtics U18 team, once again winning the Alberta Provincial Championship and qualifying for the Canada soccer national championships held in Charlottetown, Prince Edward Island. Korić concluded his tenure with the club in 2002.

=== Calgary Villains FC (2002–present) ===
Korić began his long association with Calgary Villains FC in the early 2000s, when he was appointed head coach of the club's senior team in the Alberta Major Soccer League soon after joining the organization in 2000–01. Korić implemented a European coaching philosophy that contributed to the development of Calgary Villains FC into a top-caliber side in the Alberta Major Soccer League, and shortly after his appointment as head coach, the team won the Alberta Major Soccer League Cup during the 2002 season. Korić remained head coach of the Calgary Villains FC in the Alberta Major Soccer League until 2015, winning the Alberta Major Soccer League Championship and the AMSL Coach of The Year Award in his final season.

In September 2002, following the club's league success, Calgary Villains FC expanded its operations with the launch of a youth development program under Korić's leadership. The program was structured to provide a comprehensive training environment emphasizing technical, tactical, physical, and psychological development, aligned with Korić's “Player First” philosophy, an approach that was relatively uncommon within Alberta youth soccer at the time. The program subsequently developed into one of Calgary's prominent player development environments, attracting players from diverse communities across the city and establishing pathways from youth teams to senior competition. This expansion contributed to the club's sustained competitiveness in subsequent seasons and long-term success. Korić has actively played a significant role in the development of Calgary Villains FC's youth academy, shaping the club's player development framework through the application of European coaching principles. Holding a UEFA Pro Coaching Licence, and the prestigious UEFA A Elite Youth Coaching Licence, he became the first Canadian citizen in history to be accepted into and to have completed his coaching apprenticeship with Real Madrid CF, introducing training standards emphasizing technical proficiency, tactical awareness, and long-term individual player development. Under his leadership, the Villains' youth teams have achieved consistent success at the provincial and national levels, most notably including a bronze-medal finish at the 2005 Canada soccer U14-boys national championships in Moncton, New Brunswick, and the National Championship title at the 2007 Canada soccer U16-boys national championships in Sherwood Park, Alberta, after which the team was named Alberta Soccer Association Team of the Year. Today the Calgary Villains FC has over 2,900 players, and the club has remained a regular competitor in the Alberta Player Development League, winning numerous league and cup titles, as well as representing Alberta in national competitions. Korić's tenure also reinforced structured pathways from the youth academy to senior teams, including the Alberta Premier League men's and women's side. Since his appointment as technical director in September 2002, he has overseen the progression of more than one hundred players to professional and post-secondary programs in Europe, Canada, and the United States, with alumni including Marco Carducci, Ethan Gage, Kyle Yamada, Chris Șerban, Michael Cox, Dean Northover, Chituru Odunze, and Sebastian Dzikowski, contributing to the club's reputation as a leading development organization in Alberta and Canada.

==== 2025: Debut Alberta Premier League season ====
In December 2024, it was announced that the Calgary Villains FC would enter a men's and women's team in semi-professional Alberta Premier League for the 2025 season. Korić was announced as the club's men's and women's head coach the same month. Korić made a winning start to his Alberta Premier League coaching career, guiding Calgary Villains FC Women to a 4–3 comeback victory over Edmonton BTB SC Women on 2 May 2025. The result marked both his first league match in charge and the club's first-ever Alberta Premier League win. Following the club's historic opening victory, Korić guided Calgary Villains FC Women through their inaugural Alberta Premier League campaign in 2025. The expansion side finished sixth in the league standings, recording four wins and one draw from 14 matches as they established themselves in Alberta's top women's semi-professional competition. On the men’s side, Calgary Villains FC finished ninth in the standings. The team recorded 16 losses in 16 matches, while also fielding a roster that featured a significant number of young players. The club registered the highest total of youth minutes in the league that season, reflecting its emphasis on player development during its inaugural campaign.

==== 2026: Continued growth in the Alberta Premier League ====
In his second season with Calgary Villains FC, Korić oversaw the club's second Alberta Premier League campaign, guiding the Villains to a sixth-place finish and a position ahead of fellow Calgary clubs Calgary Rangers SC and Callies United in the final standings. The season featured several notable results, including a 1–1 draw with Cavalry FC II and a 1–1 draw against Calgary Rangers. The Villains also recorded two victories over Callies United, winning 3–1 on 19 May 2026 and 1–0 on 17 July 2026. Although the Villains recorded ten defeats during the campaign, several of those matches were closely contested, with the club remaining competitive against opposition throughout the season. Their results against fellow Calgary clubs contributed to the Villains' final league position, with the team ultimately finishing ahead of both Calgary Rangers SC and Callies United in the standings. On the women's side, the Villains finished seventh in the final standings. The Villains recorded three victories during the season, including two wins over Callies United, defeating them 3–0 on 19 May and 6–1 on 17 July, before concluding the campaign with a 3–0 victory over Calgary Rangers on 28 July. The team also produced several competitive performances against higher-placed opposition throughout the season, despite finishing in the lower half of the standings. The Villains also continued to emphasize youth development under Korić, recording the highest number of youth minutes in the league while also registering the most youth-player debuts during the season.

=== Alberta Selects (2004) ===
In 2004, Korić took charge of the Alberta Soccer Association's U14 Boys Provincial Selects squad, leading the group through an undefeated campaign across Canada. The team captured the prestigious Rocky Mountain Cup Championship, establishing themselves as one of the standout provincial sides of the era. The squad was made up predominantly of players from Korić's Calgary Villains FC, a group that would go on to achieve further success the following year, earning bronze at the 2005 Canada soccer national championships.

=== Calgary United F.C. (2012) ===
Korić was appointed head coach of Calgary United for the 2012 Canadian Major Indoor Soccer League season, in which the championship was decided by a single final match. Calgary United faced the Edmonton Drillers in the league final and finished as runners-up following a 6–3 defeat in the championship game.

=== Golden Goal Soccer Academy (2000-present) ===
In 2000, Korić established his own school of football called Golden Goal Soccer Academy. Recognized as one of Canada's most prestigious soccer academies, it has been credited with developing over one hundred players who have gone on to play NCAA and U Sports soccer on scholarships, as well as numerous professional footballers. Korić founded the academy to serve as a bridge for Canadian players seeking exposure to international opportunities, particularly in Europe, where direct pathways for young athletes were limited. In addition to its training programs, Golden Goal operates as a player management company, providing guidance and career support to aspiring professional athletes. The academy functions as a global showcase program, regularly competing against top youth academies worldwide, most notably Real Madrid CF, FC Bayern Munich, VfB Stuttgart, 1. FC Nürnberg, FC Augsburg, TSV 1860 Munich, SpVgg Unterhaching, SSV Ulm 1846, TSV Schwaben Augsburg, FC Red Bull Salzburg, Kapfenberger SV, Kispest Honvéd FC, and NK Lokomotiva Zagreb. Golden Goal offers structured technical, tactical, physical, and psychological player development, Its mission is to guide young athletes through a pathway from youth competition to professional soccer, offering opportunities to advance their careers both domestically and abroad.
