= 2008–09 Copa America (indoor) =

Indoor soccer tournament

The 2008-09 Copa America was an indoor soccer tournament that included teams from 3 countries and 3 professional leagues. Each team was supposed to have played 10 games, with the three group winners plus a wild card team to qualify for a final 4 weekend to decide the title. Due to economic issues, the cup was cut short with teams playing an unequal number of games. The two group leaders with the most wins and points, the Saskatoon Accelerators and Monterrey La Raza, were selected to play in the championship of the now shortened Copa America competition. With the exception of the games involving the Monterrey La Raza of the NISL, all other games in the competition doubled as PASL-Pro regular season matches, CMISL regular season matches, or United States Open Cup for Arena Soccer matches.

== Group Standings ==
| Place | Team | GP | W/L | Pts | GF | GA |
East Group
| 1 | Monterrey La Raza (NISL) | 5 | 5-0 | 15 | 72 | 30 |
| 2 | Stockton Cougars (PASL-Pro) | 9 | 5-4 | 15 | 108 | 84 |
| 3 | Texas Outlaws (PASL-Pro) | 8 | 4-4 | 12 | 56 | 70 |
West Group
| 1 | Denver Dynamite (PASL-Pro) | 6 | 4-2 | 12 | 50 | 56 |
| 2 | Colorado Lightning (PASL-Pro) | 6 | 1-5 | 3 | 38 | 62 |
| 3 | Wenatchee Fire (PASL-Pro) | 5 | 0-5 | 0 | 34 | 68 |
Canada Group
| 1 | Saskatoon Accelerators (CMISL) | 10 | 5-5 | 15 | 59 | 43 |
| 2 | Edmonton Drillers (CMISL) | 7 | 4-3 | 12 | 42 | 51 |
| 3 | Calgary United FC (CMISL) | 8 | 4-4 | 12 | 50 | 45 |

== Copa America Final 2009 ==
February 26

Monterrey La Raza (NISL) 11, Saskatoon Accelerators(CMISL) 3
