= 2008 Canadian Major Indoor Soccer League season =

The 2008 Canadian Major Indoor Soccer League (CMISL) season had each team playing 10 games. The schedule however was unbalanced as both the Edmonton Drillers and Saskatoon Accelerators played six home games and two road games and two at a neutral site, while the Calgary United FC played five home games and five road games. The games held at the Stampede Corral were unique as they were featured in a round-robin style with all CMISL teams participating. Due to scheduling concerns at the MTS Centre, the Winnipeg Alliance FC were a road-only franchise, playing all 10 of their games away from home.

The playoff was a one game "winner-takes-all" championship game. It was played between the first and second place teams in St. Albert at the Servus Centre on March 14, 2008. The Edmonton Drillers defeated Calgary United FC by a score of 8-7.

== Teams ==
Team	City	Established	Home Arena	Notes
Calgary United FC	Calgary, Alberta	2007	Stampede Corral	
Edmonton Drillers	St. Albert, Alberta	2007	Servus Centre	Moved to St. Albert's Servus Centre for the 2008 season.
Saskatoon Accelerators	Saskatoon, Saskatchewan	2007	Credit Union Centre	
Winnipeg Alliance FC	Winnipeg, Manitoba	2007	None	Due to scheduling concerns at the MTS Centre, the Alliance will be a road-only team for the 2008 season.

== Exhibition schedule ==
Date	Home team	Score	Visiting team	Stadium	Attendance
December 28, 2007	Edmonton Drillers	5-1	Saskatoon Accelerators	Servus Centre	550
January 4, 2008	Edmonton Drillers	9-8	Saskatoon Accelerators	Servus Centre	200
January 5, 2008	Saskatoon Accelerators	9-10 (SO)	Edmonton Drillers	Credit Union Centre	2,000
January 6, 2008	Saskatoon Accelerators	4-8	Edmonton Drillers	Credit Union Centre	
April 5, 2008	Prince George FC	5-8	Edmonton Drillers	CN Centre	2,140
April 6, 2008	Prince George FC	14-7	Edmonton Drillers	CN Centre	1,546

== Regular season schedule ==
Date	Home team	Score	Visiting team	Stadium	Attendance
January 19	Calgary United FC	9-0	Winnipeg Alliance FC	Stampede Corral	400
January 19	Calgary United FC	7-2	Winnipeg Alliance FC	Stampede Corral	400
January 19	Saskatoon Accelerators	2-9	Edmonton Drillers	Stampede Corral	400
January 19	Winnipeg Alliance FC	3-6	Edmonton Drillers	Stampede Corral	400
January 19	Calgary United FC	6-2	Saskatoon Accelerators	Stampede Corral	400
January 20	Calgary United FC	9-5	Winnipeg Alliance FC	Stampede Corral	300
January 20	Saskatoon Accelerators	11-3	Winnipeg Alliance FC	Stampede Corral	300
January 20	Calgary United FC	4-3	Edmonton Drillers	Stampede Corral	300
January 25	Edmonton Drillers	10-4	Calgary United FC	Servus Centre	800
February 1	Saskatoon Accelerators	11-4	Winnipeg Alliance FC	Credit Union Centre	1000
February 3	Saskatoon Accelerators	3-2	Winnipeg Alliance FC	Credit Union Centre	1000
February 3	Saskatoon Accelerators	4-2	Winnipeg Alliance FC	Credit Union Centre	1000
February 15	Edmonton Drillers	8-4	Calgary United FC	Servus Centre	
February 22	Edmonton Drillers	10-5	Saskatoon Accelerators	Servus Centre	
February 29	Edmonton Drillers	8-3	Winnipeg Alliance FC	Servus Centre	
February 29	Edmonton Drillers	3-0	Winnipeg Alliance FC	Servus Centre	
March 2	Saskatoon Accelerators	3-6	Calgary United FC	Credit Union Centre	
March 2	Saskatoon Accelerators	0-5	Calgary United FC	Credit Union Centre	
March 7	Edmonton Drillers	5-8	Calgary United FC	Servus Centre	
March 9	Saskatoon Accelerators	6-11	Edmonton Drillers	Credit Union Centre	

== Playoff schedule ==
Date	Home team	Score	Visiting team	Stadium	Attendance
March 14	Edmonton Drillers	8-7	Calgary United FC	Servus Centre	

== Standings ==
Team	Games played	Wins	Losses	Draws	Winning Percentage	Points For	Points Against
Edmonton Drillers	10	8	2	0	.800	73	39
Calgary United FC	10	8	2	0	.800	72	38
Saskatoon Accelerators	10	4	6	0	.400	47	58
Winnipeg Alliance FC	10	0	10	0	.000	25	71
