= Ian Clarke (soccer) =

Canadian soccer player (born 1975)

Personal information
- Full name: Ian Anthony Clarke
- Date of birth: August 16, 1975 (age 51)
- Place of birth: New Westminster, Canada
- Height: 5 ft 8 in (1.73 m)
- Positions: Forward; midfielder

Senior career*
Years	Team	Apps	(Gls)
1996–1998	Vancouver 86ers		
1996–1997	Edmonton Drillers (indoor)	4	(1)
1998–2000	Milwaukee Wave (indoor)	56	(22)
2000	St. Louis Ambush (indoor)	4	(1)
2000	Wichita Wings (indoor)	9	(2)
2001	Montreal Impact	4	(0)
2003	Calgary Storm	10	(0)
- * Club domestic league appearances and goals

Ian Clarke is a Canadian retired soccer player who played professionally in the A-League and National Professional Soccer League

In 1996, Clarke, brother of Chris Clarke, signed with the Vancouver 86ers of the A-League. He played outdoor soccer with them until 1999. During those years, Clarke also played indoor soccer. In the fall of 1996, he joined the Edmonton Drillers of the National Professional Soccer League. In 1998, he returned to the indoor game with the Milwaukee Wave. He became a regular with the Wave and was named to the 1998–99 NPSL All Rookie Team. In 1999, Clarke began the season with the Wave before being traded to the St. Louis Ambush before being sent to the Wichita Wings for the end of the season. In 2001, he played for the Montreal Impact. In 2003, Clarke began the season with the Calgary Storm in the USL A-League, but left the team in July to return to Vancouver.
