= CUFC =

CUFC may refer to one of the following association football clubs:

- Calgary United F.C.
- Cambridge United F.C.
- Carlisle United F.C.
- Chapungu United F.C.
- Chesham United F.C.
- Chin United F.C.
- Chippa United F.C.
- Coagh United F.C.
- Colchester United F.C.
- Cork United F.C. (disambiguation), multiple teams
- Cranfield United F.C.
- Crewe United F.C.
- Crumlin United F.C.
- Crumlin United F.C. (Northern Ireland)
