= Edmonton Drillers =

Edmonton Drillers have been the name of three different soccer franchises:

- Edmonton Drillers (1979–82), 1979–1982, outdoor/indoor soccer
- Edmonton Drillers (1996–2000), 1996–2000, indoor soccer
- Edmonton Drillers (2007–10), 2007–2010, indoor soccer
