= Saskatoon Accelerators =

- Founded: 2007
- Stadium: Henk Ruys Soccer Center
- Chairman: Darren Hood
- Manager: Sipho Sibiya
- League: Canadian Major Indoor Soccer League
- 2009: 3rd

Saskatoon Accelerators were a professional soccer team based in Saskatoon, Saskatchewan that played in the Canadian Major Indoor Soccer League. The team played indoor soccer which is different from the official FIFA indoor game called futsal. Its home games were played at Henk Ruys Soccer Center in Saskatoon.

== Club history ==
The Saskatoon Accelerators were a charter member of the CMISL. They were officially announced as a team on January 23, 2007, by CMISL President and original franchise owner Mel Kowalchuk. Their colours were black and silver, with silver jerseys and black shorts and socks. The name was decided by Mel Kowalchuk to represent the scientific community in Saskatoon and its main tool the synchrotron at the University of Saskatchewan.

They debuted on the field on March 23, 2007, playing a "Showcase Match" against the Winnipeg Alliance FC. The "Showcase Match" consisted of two games. Each game consisted of two, ten-minute halves with an intermission between them. The Accelerators won both games by scores of 5 to 2 and 3 to 2, in front of 2,102 fans at Credit Union Centre. Due to the unbalanced scheduling of the "Showcase Season", the Accelerators had the best winning percentage of all CMISL clubs despite playing the fewest games.

In fall 2007, Mel Kowalchuk sold 80% of the Accelerators club to Edmonton businessman Darren Hood. This was done so that Mel Kowalchuk could focus solely on running the CMISL, while the franchise would have a dedicated owner to run the day-to-day operations. The Saskatoon Accelerators opened the 2008 season on January 13, 2008, against the Calgary United FC at the Credit Union Centre in Saskatoon. They played six home games and four road games this season, with all member clubs visiting Saskatoon. Previously to that, they played four pre-season games, with two of the games being played in St. Albert at the Servus Centre against the Edmonton Drillers and the other two being against the same Drillers at Credit Union Centre.

=== Year-by-year ===
Season	GP	W	L	Pct	PF	PA	Finish	North American Championship
2007	2	2	0	1.000	8	4	1st	
2008	10	4	6	.400	47	58	3rd	
2009	11	5	6	.455	60	53	3rd	DNQ
2010	10	7	3	.700	69	54	2nd	DNQ
