= Northlands Coliseum =

Indoor arena in Edmonton, Alberta, Canada

Coordinates: 53°34′17″N 113°27′22″W

- The House That Gretzky Built
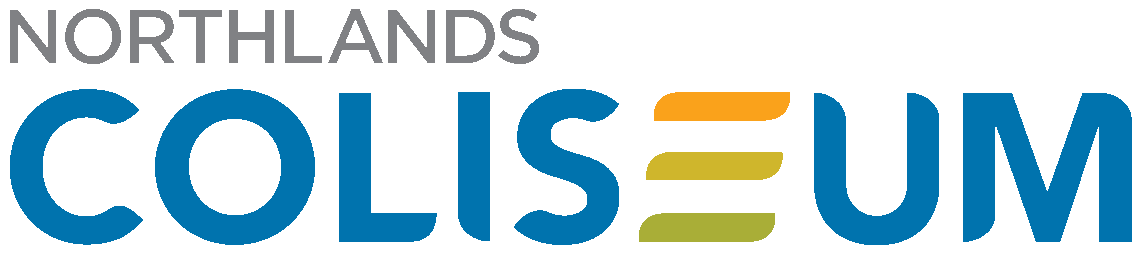

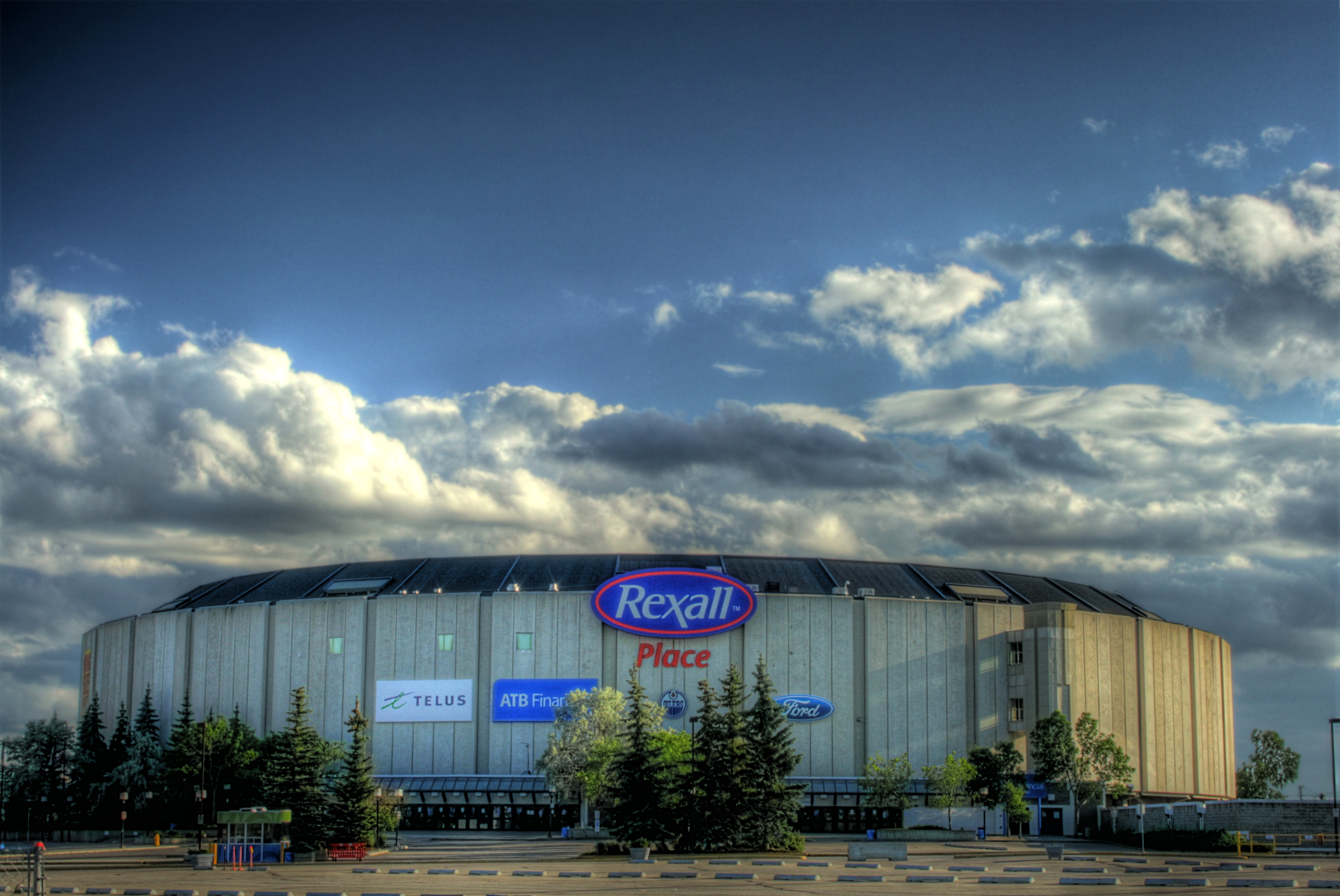
- Exterior view of Northlands Coliseum (c.2010)
- Interactive map of Northlands Coliseum
- Former names: Northlands Coliseum (1974–1995, 2016–2017); Edmonton Coliseum (1995–1998); Skyreach Centre (1998–2003); Rexall Place (2003–2016)
- Address: 7424 118 Avenue
- Location: Edmonton, Alberta, Canada
- Owner: Northlands (1974–2017); City of Edmonton (2018–)
- Capacity: Hockey: 17,100; Concerts: 13,000 (approx)
- Field size: 46,240 m^{2} (497,700 sq ft)
- Public transit: Coliseum station

Construction
- Groundbreaking: November 3, 1972
- Opened: November 10, 1974
- Renovated: 1994, 2001, 2007
- Closed: January 1, 2018
- Cost: C$17.3 million ($108 million in 2025 dollars) Renovations: 1994: $14 million ($26.8 million in 2025 dollars 2001: $10 million ($16.8 million in 2025 dollars 2007: $3.5 million ($5.15 million in 2025 dollars Total cost: $135.5 million in 2021 dollars
- Architects: Phillips, Barrett, Hillier, Jones Partners; Wynn, Forbes, Lord, Feldberg & Schmidt
- Structural engineer: Read Jones Christoffersen Ltd.
- General contractor: Batoni Bowlen Enterprises
- Main contractor: SE Johnson Ltd. (mechanical)

Tenants
- Edmonton Oilers (WHA/NHL) 1974–2016; Edmonton Oil Kings (WCHL) 1974–1976; Edmonton Drillers (NASL) 1980–1982; Edmonton Skyhawks (NBL) 1993–1994; Edmonton Sled Dogs (RHI) 1994; Edmonton Drillers (NPSL) 1996–2000; Edmonton Road Runners (AHL) 2004–2005; Edmonton Rush (NLL) 2006–2015; Edmonton Oil Kings (WHL) 2007–2016; Edmonton Drillers (CMISL) 2007

Website
- Official website

Northlands Coliseum is a defunct indoor arena in Edmonton, Alberta. It was used for sports events and concerts, and was home to the Edmonton Oilers of the World Hockey Association (WHA) and National Hockey League (NHL), and the Edmonton Oil Kings of the Western Hockey League (WHL). The arena opened in 1974, and was later known as Edmonton Coliseum, Skyreach Centre, and Rexall Place, before returning to the Northlands Coliseum name in summer 2016.

The arena hosted the 1981 and 1984 Canada Cup hockey tournaments, the 1978 Commonwealth Games, seven Stanley Cup Finals (Oilers losses in 1983 and 2006, and Oilers victories in 1984, 1985, 1987, 1988, and 1990), many other hockey events, along with other sporting events and major concerts.

The final NHL game played at the arena was on April 6, 2016. The building closed on New Year's Day 2018, after ownership of the facility was transferred from Northlands to the City of Edmonton. Northlands had planned to re-develop the arena into a multi-level ice facility, but these plans were scrapped after it was found that renovating the facility would be more costly than building a new one altogether.

The venue is now in the process of being dismantled, which is expected to take an extended period of time due to the presence of hazardous substances such as lead and asbestos. Final demolition of the building is expected to begin in summer 2026, and be completed by 2028.

== History ==
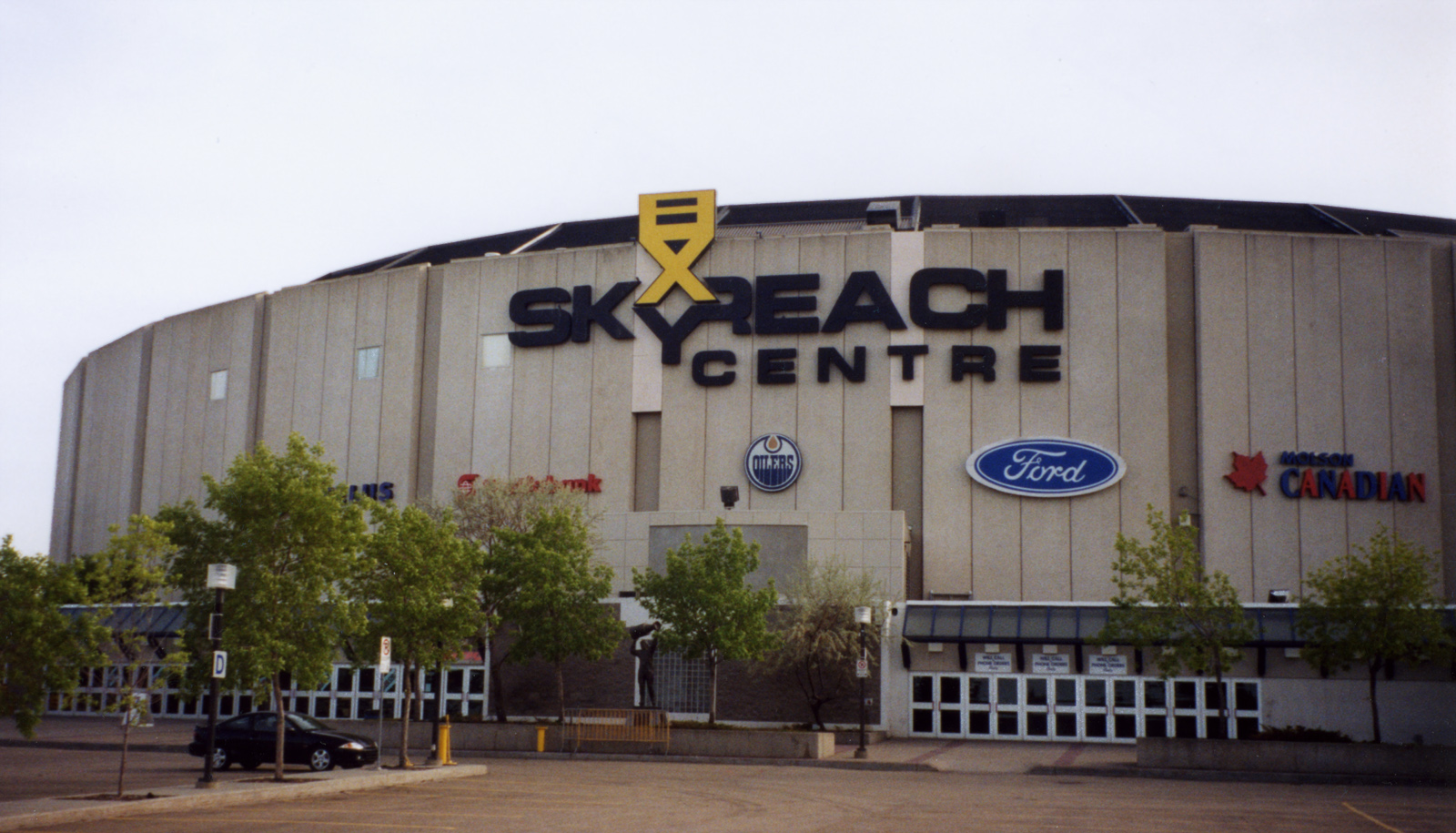
Skyreach Centre in 2001

The Coliseum opened in 1974 as a replacement for the aging Edmonton Gardens. While the Edmonton Oilers' ownership group, including Charles Allard, had initially pursued to construct their own arena, they backtracked and partnered with the Edmonton Exhibition Association (EEA, now Northlands)—the non-profit operator of Edmonton Gardens—after they expressed concern that Allard's proposed arena would "greatly impact and damage" the organization. The Association and others had made proposals for a downtown arena to replace Edmonton Gardens, but referendums on the matter were struck down by voters.

The 16,000-seat arena used the same architect and plans as Vancouver's Pacific Coliseum. A crane was placed on a circular track to help speed up construction. The final months of construction process in 1974 hit several setbacks, including strikes by steelworkers, cement workers, and elevator workers, and the last batch of 5,000 seats arriving only shortly before its inaugural event—the Oilers' home opener on November 10, 1974, against the Cleveland Crusaders. After its first game, the Coliseum received positive reviews by visitors and sportswriters. The EEA held an official grand opening event open July 1, 1975. For the inaugural 1979–80 Oilers NHL season, it was configured with 15,432 seats, expanding to 17,498 for the start of the 1980–81 Edmonton Oilers season.

By the early 1990s, the Coliseum had begun to lag behind newer NHL arenas in terms of amenities such as luxury boxes. Amid financial turmoil, including the team having signed away multiple star players (such as Wayne Gretzky), team owner Peter Pocklington threatened to relocate the Oilers unless he was given full control of the Coliseum and all its revenue, and could build luxury boxes in the arena. In 1994, he reached a rent agreement with Northlands valued at $2.8 million per year, and commenced renovations that included 52 suites, reducing game-day attendance to 17,100. The agreement contained clauses requiring the Oilers to remain in Edmonton for 10 years, and that the team be offered to local investors for a fixed price of US$70 million within 30 days if a current or proposed owner announced an intent to relocate the team.

In 1997, a proposed sale to Leslie Alexander triggered the clause, resulting in the Edmonton Investors Group (EIG) being formed to purchase the team. Northlands regained control of the Coliseum, with the Oilers agreeing to pay operational costs and $1 in rent per-year, in exchange for being able to receive revenue from hockey games and designated parking spots at the arena, and being able to sell naming rights. In October 1998, the Coliseum was renamed Skyreach Centre after a naming rights agreement with Skyreach Equipment.

In November 2003, the naming rights were acquired by the pharmacy chain Rexall, under which it was renamed Rexall Place. The chain's then-parent Katz Group later purchased the Oilers and the Oil Kings.

Rexall Place logo, 2003 to 2016

Before the 2007–08 season started, the Oilers dressing room underwent a $3.5-million renovation. The room was widened, adding a new medical room, lounge, bar, video room, weight room as well as other new facilities.

=== Replacement by Rogers Place, closure and demolition plans ===
Given the age and small size of the Coliseum (which was second-oldest and third-smallest arena in the NHL as of 2015), the construction of a new arena for the Edmonton Oilers was proposed by the Katz Group in 2010. An agreement was reached in January 2012 between the Katz Group and the City of Edmonton for the construction of Rogers Place in downtown Edmonton. Construction started in March 2014, and it opened in September 2016 with a seating capacity of 18,347.

The Oilers' final game at Rexall Place was played on April 6, 2016, against the Vancouver Canucks. The Oilers won 6–2; the last NHL goal was scored by Oiler Leon Draisaitl. A post-game ceremony was held, featuring current and past Oilers players. Northlands said that the old arena would remain open, and a number of concerts and sporting events were still held there even after the Oilers left. The last hockey game held at the Coliseum was in December 2017, when the AJHL's Okotoks Oilers defeated the Spruce Grove Saints 6-4.

On February 17, 2016, Northlands unveiled plans to convert Northlands Coliseum into a multi-level ice facility, with a later proposal calling for a partnership with Hockey Canada to make it a Hockey Canada Centre of Excellence, but it was later discovered that renovating the Coliseum would be more costly than building a new facility.

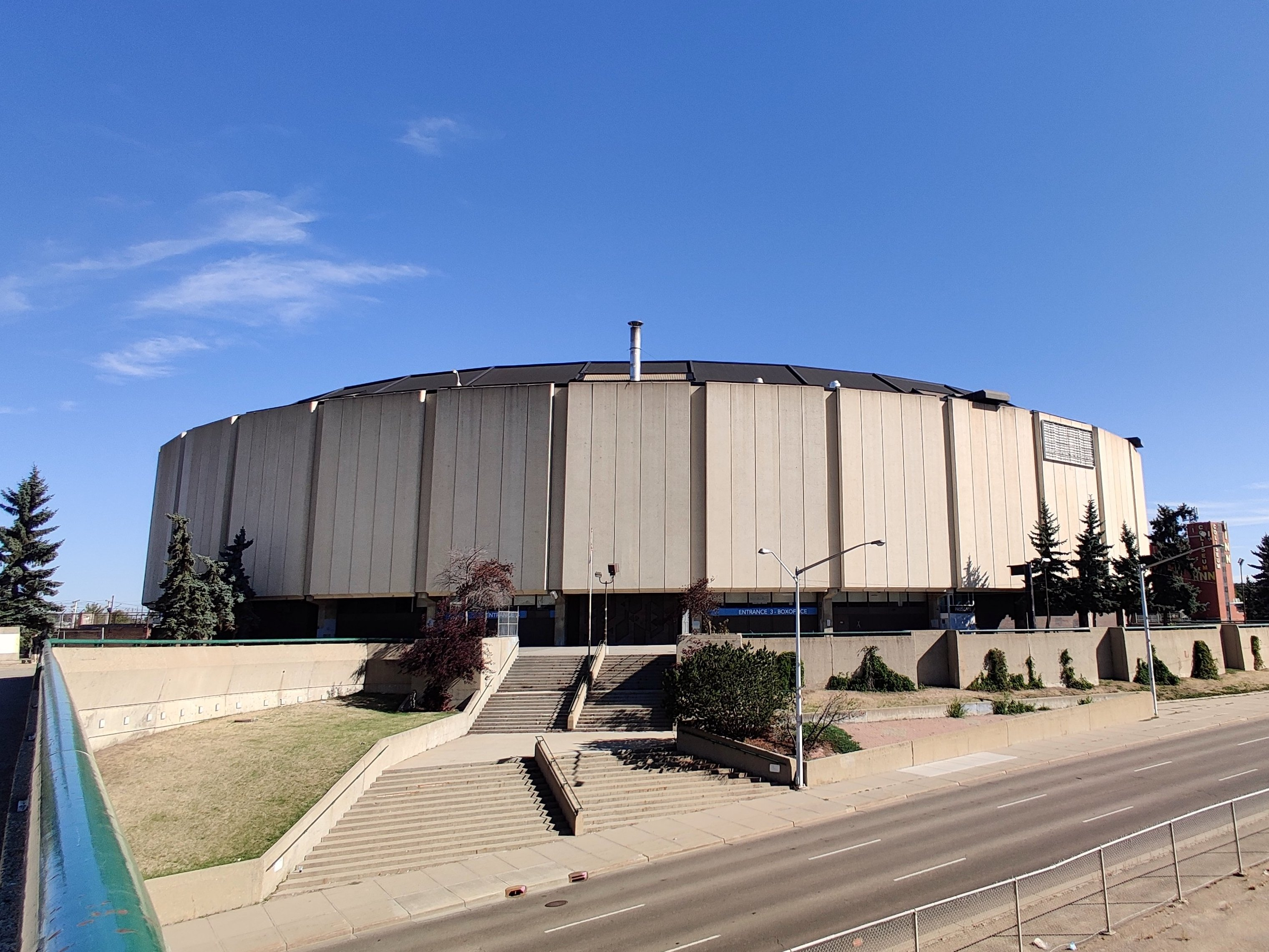
The disused Northlands Coliseum in 2021

As more major concerts and other events were drawn away to Rogers Place, Northlands experienced declines in revenue. This made it difficult for the non-profit organization to pay off a loan by the City that was used to fund the 2009 expansion of the Edmonton Expo Centre. On September 13, 2017, the City of Edmonton reached an agreement to take over the arena from Northlands effective January 1, 2018 (the same date that control of the Edmonton Expo Centre transferred to the Edmonton Economic Development Corporation under a similar agreement), as it prepared to transition to primarily being an agricultural organization. The venue permanently ceased operations on that date; Oilers Entertainment Group also agreed to release the city from a $17 million (out of $20 million) sponsorship agreement.

Despite other proposals from parties wanting to convert the Coliseum to a sports and recreation facility, the master agreement between Oilers Entertainment Group and the city of Edmonton prohibited the city from making any further investments in the building, nor did it allow use as a sports or entertainment facility. Plans to repurpose the Northlands site proposed the demolition of the Coliseum.

On December 12, 2022, in light of the $1.5 million annual cost to upkeep the empty building in its form since its closure at the end of 2017, and the lack of ability to repurpose the structure, Edmonton City Council voted to demolish the Northlands Coliseum at a cost of $35 million over four years, with no projected start date. In August 2025, it was announced that major demolition work on the building would begin in summer 2026, and be completed by 2028.

== Arena information ==
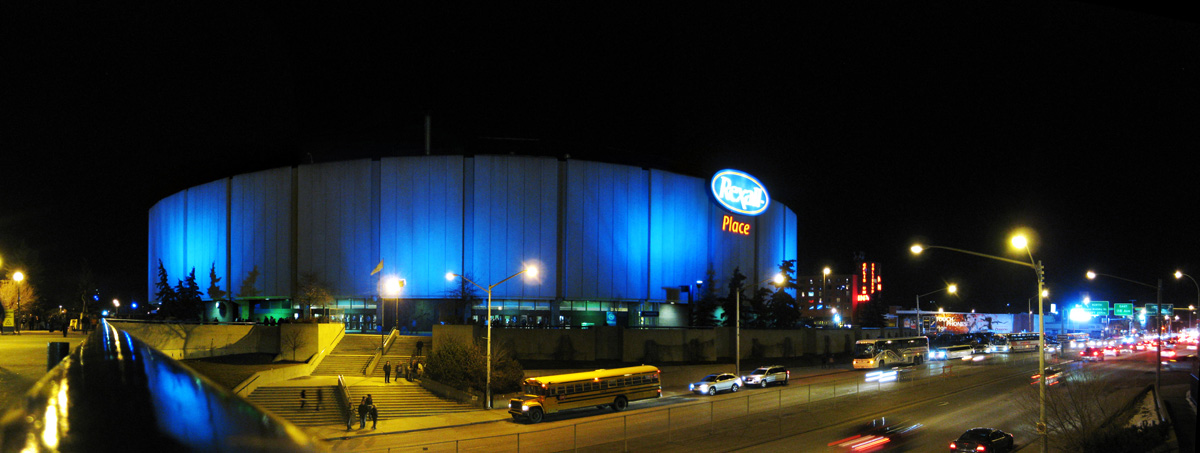
Rexall Place at night

The official capacity for hockey when the arena closed was 16,839, which was slightly less than the 17,100 the arena held before the 2001–02 NHL season. It was one of three NHL arenas (the others being the MTS Centre in Winnipeg and Barclays Center in Brooklyn) seating less than 17,000 fans in its configuration. When it opened, the capacity was 15,423, but it was increased to 17,490 after the Oilers joined the NHL by adding an extra tier of seating on the side opposite the press box. This was increased to 17,498 in 1982 and to 17,503 in 1986. The arena underwent an extensive renovation in 1994 in which the seating capacity was reduced to make way for 52 luxury suites. 15 more suites were added in 2001. The arena could also be noisy, as noise levels reached 119 decibels during playoff games.

Northlands Coliseum was the first NHL arena in Canada to have a centre-hung scoreboard with an electronic message board; the original scoreboard including a black-and-white dot matrix board. This was replaced in 1987 by a centre-hung scoreboard with a colour matrix screen, which in 1994 was replaced with an eight-sided scoreboard with four video screens. The last centre-hung scoreboard, designed by White Way Sign, featured eight message boards at the top and four video screens at the bottom, separated by LED rings. The arena also featured 360-degree fascia signage by Daktronics.

The Coliseum was the last NHL arena with the player benches on the same side as the TV cameras. In all other NHL venues, the TV cameras are on the same side as the scorekeepers table and penalty boxes.

== Notable events ==
- The 1975 Skate Canada International.
- Gymnastics in the 1978 Commonwealth Games.
- ABBA opened their 1979 North American Tour here on September 13, 1979.
- The 1981 Canada Cup, along with three other venues in Canada.
- Games 1 & 2 of the 1983 Stanley Cup Final.
- The 1984 Canada Cup, along with six other venues in Canada and the United States.
- Games 3, 4, and 5 of the 1984 Stanley Cup Final.
- Games 3, 4, and 5 of the 1985 Stanley Cup Final.
- Games 1, 2, 5, and 7 of the 1987 Stanley Cup Final.
- Games 1, 2, and 5 of the 1988 Stanley Cup Final.
- The 1989 National Hockey League All-Star Game.
- Games 3 and 4 of the 1990 Stanley Cup Final.
- The 1994 Canadian Figure Skating Championships.
- The 1995 NHL entry draft.
- In the 1995 World Junior Hockey Championships, which were held in various cities and towns throughout Alberta, Edmonton Coliseum was the site of several games, including Canada's 6–3 victory over Finland on New Year's Day.
- The 1996 World Figure Skating Championships.
- WWE Raw episodes in 1997, 2002, and 2011.
- The 1999, 2005, and 2013 Tim Hortons Briers.
- Toronto Raptors preseason games in 1999 and 2008
- WWE SmackDown episodes in 2001, 2005, 2009, 2010, and 2013.
- WWE Backlash 2004.
- The 2004 Canadian Figure Skating Championships.
- Games 3, 4, and 6 of the 2006 Stanley Cup Final.
- The 2007 Ford World Men's Curling Championship.
- The 2008 CHL Top Prospects Game.
- The 2008 National Lacrosse League All Star Game.
- The PBR's Built Ford Tough Series held an event at the venue on the weekend of July 25–26, 2008.
- WWE ECW episode in 2009.
- The 2009 Canadian Olympic Curling Trials.
- The 2012 World Junior Ice Hockey Championships (in December 2011), along with the Scotiabank Saddledome.
- Last NHL game on April 6, 2016
- The 2017 Ford World Men's Curling Championship
- Matches of the 2017 Davis Cup tie between Canada and India

=== Avco World Trophy playoff opponents ===
- Houston Aeros: 1977
- New England Whalers: 1978, 1979
- Winnipeg Jets: 1976, 1979

=== Stanley Cup playoff opponents ===
- Anaheim Ducks: 2006
- Boston Bruins: 1988, 1990
- Calgary Flames: 1983, 1984, 1986, 1988, 1991
- Carolina Hurricanes: 2006
- Chicago Black Hawks: 1983, 1985
- Chicago Blackhawks: 1990, 1992
- Colorado Avalanche: 1997, 1998
- Dallas Stars: 1997, 1998, 1999, 2000, 2001, 2003
- Detroit Red Wings: 1987, 1988, 2006
- Los Angeles Kings: 1982, 1985, 1987, 1989, 1990, 1991, 1992
- Mighty Ducks of Anaheim: 2006
- Minnesota North Stars: 1984, 1991
- Montreal Canadiens: 1981
- New York Islanders: 1981, 1983, 1984
- Philadelphia Flyers: 1980, 1985, 1987
- San Jose Sharks: 2006
- Vancouver Canucks: 1986, 1992
- Winnipeg Jets: 1983, 1984, 1985, 1987, 1988, 1990

== Live recordings ==
The following bands recorded live performances in the arena:

- ABBA started their North American tour here in 1979, and part of the tour documentary was recorded here.
- Trooper filmed their single "3 Dressed Up As a 9" from their album Flying Colors on November 9, 1979, at the arena.
- Billy Graham videotaped his 1980 Northern Alberta crusade at the arena, which also featured a young Amy Grant as a musical guest.
- Dottie West recorded her 1983 Showtime special Dottie West: Full Circle with the Alberta Orchestra at the arena, which also featured Larry Gatlin & The Gatlin Brothers, John Schneider, David Frizzell and Shelly West in August 1982.
- Rush performed at the arena on June 25, 1981; two songs from this concert were included on the 2012 reissue of their album 2112.
- Yes filmed their 9012Live video at the arena on September 28–29, 1984. Portions of this show also appear on the 9012Live: The Solos live album. Both the video and live album were released in 1985.
- Nickelback filmed their 2002 concert video Live at Home at the arena.
- Our Lady Peace recorded part of their 2003 record Live at the arena.
- Michael W. Smith recorded his live "Worship" DVD at YC Alberta.
- Corb Lund recorded his 2007 concert on video during the course of the Horse Soldier! Horse Soldier! tour.
- Thousand Foot Krutch filmed their concert at YC Alberta on May 28, 2010, at the arena.
- Metallica filmed part of their Through the Never film during their two nights at the arena on August 17 and 18, 2012.
- Demi Lovato's performance at the arena on October 4, 2014, was filmed for a DVD release.
- Sixx:A.M. filmed their live video for "We Will Not Go Quietly" at the arena during their September 17, 2016 show.

== See also ==
- List of Commonwealth Games venues
- List of indoor arenas in Canada

Events and tenants
Preceded by St. Jakobshalle, Basel, Switzerland	Host of the World Curling Championships; 2017	Succeeded by Orleans Arena, Paradise, Nevada
Preceded by Edmonton Gardens	Home of the Edmonton Oilers; 1974–2016	Succeeded by Rogers Place
Preceded by an indoor arena in Red Deer, Alberta	Host of YC Alberta; 2000 – 2016	Succeeded by Enmax Centrium, Red Deer, Alberta
First Arena	Home of the Edmonton Oil Kings; 2007–2016	Succeeded by Rogers Place
Preceded by Ottawa Civic Centre	Home of the Edmonton Rush; 2006–2015	Succeeded by SaskTel Centre, Saskatoon
Preceded by Credit Union Centre, Saskatoon	Host of the Tim Hortons Brier; 2013	Succeeded by Interior Savings Centre, Kamloops
Preceded by HSBC Arena & Dwyer Arena, New York	Host of the World Junior Ice; Hockey Championships along with Scotiabank Saddledome; 2012	Succeeded by Ufa Arena & Ufa Ice Palace, Russia
Preceded by Colisée Pepsi, Quebec City, Quebec	Host of the CHL Top Prospects Game; 2008	Succeeded by General Motors Centre, Oshawa
Preceded by Halifax Metro Centre	Host of the Canadian Olympic Curling Trials; 2009	Succeeded by MTS Centre, Winnipeg
Preceded by Rose Garden Arena, Portland, Oregon	Host of the National Lacrosse; League All-Star Game; 2008	Succeeded by Pepsi Center, Denver
Preceded by Tsongas Center at UMass; Lowell, Massachusetts	Host of the World Curling Championships; 2007	Succeeded by Ralph Engelstad Arena, Grand Forks, North Dakota
First Arena	Home of the Edmonton Drillers (CMISL); 2007	Succeeded by Servus Credit Union; Place, St. Albert, Alberta
Preceded by Saskatchewan Place, Saskatoon	Host of the Tim Hortons Brier; 2005	Succeeded by Brandt Centre, Regina, Saskatchewan
Preceded by Ricoh Coliseum, Toronto	Home of the Edmonton Road Runners; 2004–2005	Succeeded by Cox Convention Center, Oklahoma City
Preceded by Worcester's Centrum Centre, Massachusetts	Host of the WWE Backlash; 2004	Succeeded by Verizon Wireless Arena, Manchester, New Hampshire
Preceded by an indoor arena in Chicago	Home of the Edmonton Drillers (NPSL); 1996–2000	Dissolved
Preceded by Winnipeg Arena	Host of the Labatt Brier; 1999	Succeeded by Saskatchewan Place, Saskatoon
Preceded by National Indoor Arena, Birmingham	Host of the World Figure Skating Championships; 1996	Succeeded by CIG de Malley, Lausanne, Switzerland
First Arena	Home of the Edmonton Sled Dogs; 1994	Succeeded by Orlando Arena
Preceded by St. Louis Arena	Host of the NHL All-Star Game; 1989	Succeeded by Pittsburgh Civic Arena
Preceded by Edmonton Gardens	Home of the Edmonton Oil Kings (WCHL); 1974–1976	Succeeded by Memorial Coliseum, Portland, Oregon
