= Copa America (indoor) =

- Most recent season or competition: 2008–09 Copa America (indoor)
- Sport: Indoor soccer
- Founded: 2008
- No. of teams: 9 total from PASL-Pro, MISL, CMISL
- Most titles: Monterrey La Raza (1)
- Related competitions: PASL-Pro

The Copa America is an Indoor soccer tournament organised by the Professional Arena Soccer League. As well as teams from the PASL, the competition is also open to teams from the Canadian Major Indoor Soccer League and the Major Indoor Soccer League.

== Champions ==
Season	Champion	Score	Runner-up
2008–09	Monterrey La Raza	11–3	Saskatoon Accelerators
