= LeBaron Hollimon =

American college women's soccer coach (born 1969)

Personal information
- Full name: LeBaron Hollimon
- Date of birth: August 13, 1969 (age 57)
- Place of birth: Wichita, Kansas, United States

College career
| Years | Team | Apps | (Gls) |
| 1988–1991 | Eastern Illinois Panthers | | |

Senior career*
| Years | Team | Apps | (Gls) |
| 1991–1992 | Tulsa Ambush (indoor) | 22 | (5) |
| 1992–1999 | Wichita Wings (indoor) | 238 | (99) |
| 1999–2000 | Edmonton Drillers (indoor) | 43 | (6) |
| 2000–2001 | Kansas City Attack (indoor) | 20 | (3) |
| 2001 | Edmonton Drillers (indoor) | 9 | (2) |

Managerial career
- 2011–2013: Wichita Wings
- 2013–2014: Hutchinson Blue Dragons (women's asst.)
- 2014–2015: Cal State San Bernardino Coyotes (men's asst.)
- 2015–2021: Cal State San Bernardino Coyotes (women's)
- 2019–2021: Ontario Fury (asst.)
- 2021–2022: Kansas Wesleyan Coyotes
- 2021–: FC Wichita (men's & women's asst.)
- * Club domestic league appearances and goals

LeBaron Hollimon (born August 13, 1969) is an American soccer coach who is currently on the staff of FC Wichita. Hollimon serves as the Director of Coaching for the FC Wichita Academy and also coaches with the men's USL League Two and women's United Women's Soccer teams.

== Early life ==
Hollimon was born in Wichita, Kansas, where he graduated from Wichita Northwest High School in 1987. As a high school player, LeBaron was named All-City in both the Spring and Fall seasons of 1986. In 2009 Hollimon was named to the 50th Anniversary All-City team.

== Coach ==
Hollimon has coached several competitive youth club teams in the Wichita, Kansas area. During his reign as a youth soccer coach his teams have won the USA Cup twice, won the Kansas State Cup twice, and won the Disney Cup International Youth Soccer Tournament.

For his accomplishments as both a player and as a youth coach he was inducted into the Kansas Soccer Hall of Fame in 2008.

In 2011, Hollimon was named head coach of the Wichita Wings, a member of the Major Indoor Soccer League. He spent two seasons with the Wichita Wings, before the franchise folded.

Following his professional coaching debut, Hollimon spent 2013 as an assistant women's coach at Hutchinson Community College.

In 2014, Hollimon joined the California State University, San Bernardino men's soccer program as an assistant. The following season he was named interim head coach of the women's team when the head coach, Travis Clarke, stepped down. Hollimon was then given the head coach position beginning with the 2016 season.

In 2021, Hollimon returned to Kansas, named head men's soccer coach at Kansas Wesleyan University, as well as taking on a key role within the FC Wichita organization.

== Player ==
Hollimon attended Eastern Illinois University, playing on the men's soccer team. He graduated with a bachelor's degree in biology. In 1991, the Tulsa Ambush of the National Professional Soccer League selected Hollimon in the second round of the NPSL draft. In 1992, the Wichita Wings selected Hollimon in the supplemental draft when they entered the NPSL. With his selection by the Wings, he became the first native Wichitan to play for the team. During his seven years with the Wichita Wings, Hollimon made six playoff appearances. He also "finished in the top five in every major statistical category in his career in Wichita." In 1999, the Wings traded Hollimon and Sterling Wescott to the Edmonton Drillers in exchange for Pat Onstad and Bill Sedgewick. He played for the Drillers through the 1999–2000 season and began the 2000–2001 season there before moving to the Kansas City Attack.

Following are the career statistics for Hollimon over the years 1992–1998, for which he was ranked in the top five for all-time leaders.

| Rank | Category | Total |
|---|---|---|
| 3 | Games Played | 204 |
| 5 | 3-Point Goals | 8 |
| 4 | 2-Point Goals | 68 |
| 4 | Assists | 59 |
| 5 | Points | 227 |
| 4 | Blocked Shots | 125 |
| 2 | Game-Winning Goals | 9 |
| 2 | Fouls | 249 |

== Awards ==
Awards
| 1993–94 | Wichita Wings Unsung Hero |
| 2000 | Edmonton Drillers Defensive Player of the Year [1] |
| 2008 | Inducted to the Kansas Soccer Hall of Fame [1] |
| 2009 | Named to Eagle's 50th anniversary All-City team |
