= 2009 Canadian Major Indoor Soccer League season =

The 2008–09 Canadian Major Indoor Soccer League (CMISL) season sees a different format than previous seasons. As the league has become affiliated with the Professional Arena Soccer League (PASL) in the United States, the Edmonton Drillers and Saskatoon Accelerators will play four games and the Calgary United FC will play eight games against the PASL teams. Edmonton and Saskatoon will play two home games and two road games and Calgary will play four home games and four road games against PASL teams. In the CMISL portion of the schedule each team will play eight games. This will see Edmonton play six home games and two road games, Saskatoon play two home games and six road games and Calgary play six home games and two road games. As a result of the imbalanced schedule, the CMISL announced that all Calgary United FC games against PASL opponents will only be worth one point in the standings. The remainder of Calgary's schedule, as well as the entire Edmonton and Saskatoon schedules are worth two points in the standings.

The playoffs will feature the CMISL champion taking part in an interlocking championship with the winners of the PASL and the winner of the Mexican Liga Mexicana de Futbol Rapido. The CMISL championship will again be a first place versus second place game to be held March 8, 2009 in Calgary.

As the CMISL as become affiliated with the PASL, the CMISL has adopted the rules of the PASL. The most substantial change was that all goals scored are now worth a single point.

== Teams ==
Team	City	Established	Home Arena	Notes
Calgary United FC	Calgary, Alberta	2007	Calgary Soccer Centre	
Edmonton Drillers	St. Albert, Alberta	2007	Servus Centre	
Saskatoon Accelerators	Saskatoon, Saskatchewan	2007	Credit Union Centre	

== Standings ==
CMISL standings
Team	Games played	Wins	Losses	Draws	Winning percentage	Points for	Points against	Home record	Road record	Interleague record	CMISL points
Edmonton Drillers	12	9	3	0	.750	82	80	6-2	3-1	3-1	18
Calgary United FC	16	8	8	0	.500	109	84	5-3	3-5	5-3	11
Saskatoon Accelerators	11	5	6	0	.455	60	53	3-1	2-5	2-1	10

== Regular season schedule ==
Date	Home team	Score	Visiting team	Stadium	Attendance
November 1, 2008	Calgary United FC	5–3	Denver Dynamite	Calgary Soccer Centre	500
November 2, 2008	Calgary United FC	5–2	Denver Dynamite	Calgary Soccer Centre	350
November 22, 2008	Calgary United FC	6–7 (OT)	Edmonton Drillers	Calgary Soccer Centre	212
November 28, 2008	St. Louis Illusion	8–5	Calgary United FC	The Game Arena	1,243
November 29, 2008	Texas Outlaws	6–5	Calgary United FC	NYTEX Sports Centre	
December 6, 2008	Calgary United FC	4–2	Saskatoon Accelerators	Calgary Soccer Centre	367
December 7, 2008	Calgary United FC	9–4	Saskatoon Accelerators	Calgary Soccer Centre	158
December 13, 2008	Stockton Cougars	16–7	Edmonton Drillers	Stockton Arena	2,018
December 14, 2008	Wenatchee Fire	7–10	Edmonton Drillers	Town Toyota Center	
December 19, 2008	Edmonton Drillers	7–4	Colorado Lightning	Servus Centre	
December 20, 2008	Saskatoon Accelerators	5–3	Colorado Lightning	Credit Union Centre	
December 26, 2008	Edmonton Drillers	7–4	Saskatoon Accelerators	Servus Centre	
December 26, 2008	Edmonton Drillers	3–6	Saskatoon Accelerators	Servus Centre	
January 2, 2009	Edmonton Drillers	4–7	Saskatoon Accelerators	Servus Centre	
January 2, 2009	Edmonton Drillers	4–3	Saskatoon Accelerators	Servus Centre	
January 3, 2009	Stockton Cougars	8–11	Calgary United FC	Stockton Arena	2,038
January 4, 2009	Wenatchee Fire	6–7	Calgary United FC	Wenatchee Valley Sportsplex	
January 10, 2009	Calgary United FC	9–10	Edmonton Drillers	Calgary Soccer Centre	
January 23, 2009	Saskatoon Accelerators	3–4	Calgary United FC	Credit Union Centre	
January 23, 2009	Saskatoon Accelerators	5–2	Calgary United FC	Credit Union Centre	
February 21, 2009	Calgary United FC	22–2	Wenatchee Fire	Calgary Soccer Centre	
February 22, 2009	Saskatoon Accelerators	16–2	Wenatchee Fire	Credit Union Centre	
February 27, 2009	Edmonton Drillers	6–5	Calgary United FC	Servus Centre	
February 27, 2009	Edmonton Drillers	4–3	Calgary United FC	Servus Centre	
February 27, 2009	Monterrey La Raza	11–3	Saskatoon Accelerators *	Arena Monterrey	
March 6, 2009	Edmonton Drillers	13–10	Texas Outlaws	Servus Centre	
March 7, 2009	Calgary United FC	7–8	Texas Outlaws	Calgary Soccer Centre	

- * Game counted as 4 points in the Standings for Saskatoon, as two other games were canceled in order to play it. Game doubled as the 2008–09 Copa América Final.

== Playoff schedule ==
Date	Home team	Score	Visiting team	Stadium	Attendance
March 8, 2009	Edmonton Drillers	7–6; Report	Calgary United	Calgary Soccer Centre	
