= 2007 Canadian Major Indoor Soccer League season =

For 2007, the Canadian Major Indoor Soccer League played a "Showcase Season," or an exhibition schedule, to create interest and test the markets.

== Teams ==
- Calgary United FC
- Edmonton Drillers
- Winnipeg Alliance FC
- Saskatoon Accelerators

== Schedule ==
Date	Home team	Score	Visiting team	Stadium	Attendance
March 10	Calgary United FC	5-1	Edmonton Drillers	Stampede Corral	1,850
March 10	Calgary United FC	0-2	Edmonton Drillers	Stampede Corral	1,850
March 10 Tie-Break Shootout	Calgary United FC	1-2	Edmonton Drillers	Stampede Corral	1,850
March 18	Edmonton Drillers	0-4	Calgary United FC	Rexall Place	3,730
March 18	Edmonton Drillers	3-0	Calgary United FC	Rexall Place	3,730
March 18 Tie-Break Shootout	Edmonton Drillers	2-3	Calgary United FC	Rexall Place	3,730
March 23	Saskatoon Accelerators	5-2	Winnipeg Alliance FC	Credit Union Centre	2,102
March 23	Saskatoon Accelerators	3-2	Winnipeg Alliance FC	Credit Union Centre	2,102
April 1	Winnipeg Alliance FC	1-5	Edmonton Drillers	MTS Centre	7,727
April 1	Winnipeg Alliance FC	1-2	Edmonton Drillers	MTS Centre	7,727

== Final standings ==
Team	Games played	Wins	Losses	Draws	Series Won	Winning Percentage	Points For	Points Against
Saskatoon Accelerators	2	2	0	0	1	1.000	8	4
Edmonton Drillers	6	4	2	0	2	.666	13	11
Calgary United FC	4	2	2	0	1	.500	9	6
Winnipeg Alliance FC	4	0	4	0	0	.000	6	15
