= Copa America (disambiguation) =

Copa América is a South American men's football competition.

Copa America may also refer to:

- Copa América Femenina, a women's competition
- Copa América de Futsal, a futsal competition
- Copa America (indoor), an indoor football competition
- Copa América (baseball), an international baseball competition
- CSP Copa America, or Rink Hockey American Championship, an international rink hockey competition
- Copa América (men's volleyball), a men's volleyball competition
- Copa América (women's volleyball), a women's volleyball competition

== See also ==
- America's Cup (disambiguation)
