= Martin Dugas =

Canadian former soccer player

Personal information
- Date of birth: 15 October 1972 (age 54)
- Place of birth: St. Catharines, Ontario, Canada
- Height: 6 ft 2 in (1.88 m)
- Position: Midfielder

College career
Years	Team	Apps	(Gls)
?–1991–?	McMaster Marauders		

Senior career*
Years	Team	Apps	(Gls)
1987–1993	St. Catharines Wolves		
1994–1996	SC Cambuur	18	(0)
1996	Watford	0	(0)
1996–2000	Edmonton Drillers (indoor)	138	(102)
1997–1998	Toronto Lynx	35	(3)
1997–1998	FC St. Pauli		
1998	Hershey Wildcats	6	(0)
1999	Staten Island Vipers	20	(1)
2000–2001	Detroit Rockers (indoor)	22	(7)
2001	Montreal Impact	4	(1)
2001–2003	Milwaukee Wave (indoor)	75	(23)
2002	Calgary Storm	3	(0)
2003–2004	Dallas Sidekicks (indoor)	23	(10)
2007–2008	Edmonton Drillers (indoor)	2	(0)

Managerial career
- 2007–2009: Edmonton Drillers
- * Club domestic league appearances and goals as of 4 January 2010

Martin Dugas (born 15 October 1972) is a Canadian former soccer player who spent a total of 12 years as a professional. He last coached the Edmonton Drillers.

== Career ==
=== Club career ===
Dugas was an OUA soccer West Division All-Star in 1991 playing for McMaster University.

Dugas played for his hometown side St. Catharines Wolves from 1987 until 1993 before joining Dutch club SC Cambuur. Had brief stints with FC St. Pauli in Germany and Watford in England (although he never made a first-team league appearance with the Hornets.) In the fall of 1996, he returned to Canada where he signed with the Edmonton Drillers of the National Professional Soccer League. He would spend most of the rest of his career playing outdoor soccer during the summer and indoor soccer during the winter. He would play for the Driller until the start of the 2000–2001 NPSL season. That year, he began the season in Edmonton until traded to the Detroit Rockers after nine games. He finished the season with Detroit, then played from 2001 to 2003 with the Milwaukee Wave. In 2003, the Monterrey Fury selected Dugas in the NPSL Expansion Draft, then traded him to the Dallas Sidekicks for the 2003–2004 indoor season. He also played for the Toronto Lynx through the 1998 season USISL season. In May 1999, he signed with the Staten Island Vipers in the USL A-League. The Vipers folded at the end of the season. He then played for the Montreal Impact in 2001 USL A-League. In 2002, he played for the Calgary Storm, also in the USL A-League. In 2007 moved to Edmonton Drillers and signed a contract as Player-Coach.

=== International career ===
Dugas was an unused substitute for Canada at the 1996 CONCACAF Gold Cup.

== Coaching career ==
Dugas worked as head coach of the 2008–09 CMISL Edmonton Drillers and was in January 2010 replaces by Kevin Poissant.

== Personal life ==
Dugas has an Irish passport which he qualifies for through his mother.
