= AmeriCup =

AmeriCup may refer to:

- FIBA AmeriCup
- FIBA Under-16 AmeriCup
- FIBA Under-18 AmeriCup
- FIBA Women's AmeriCup
- FIBA Under-16 Women's AmeriCup
- FIBA Under-18 Women's AmeriCup
- FIBA 3x3 AmeriCup

== See also ==
- America's Cup (disambiguation)
