= American Cup (disambiguation) =

American Cup may refer to:

- American Cup, a historical U.S. soccer tournament
- American Cup (gymnastics), an annual gymnastics competition in the U.S.
- American Cup (chess), an annual chess tournament in the U.S.
- America's Cup, a sailing competition

== See also ==
- America's Cup (disambiguation)
