= Winnipeg Alliance FC =

- Full name: Winnipeg Alliance FC
- Founded: 2007-2011
- Dissolved: January 2012
- Stadium: Gateway Recreation Centre
- Capacity: 500/15,003
- Manager: Robbin Watson
- League: Canadian Major Indoor Soccer League

Winnipeg Alliance FC were a professional indoor soccer team that played in the Canadian Major Indoor Soccer League (CMISL) from 2007 through 2011. The team suspended operations in January 2012.

== History ==
=== 2007 season ===
The Winnipeg Alliance was one of 4 founding teams of the CMISL. In 2007 the league played a Showcase season consisting of exhibition games the Alliance played 2 double headers against the Edmonton Drillers. Although it did not win any games in its showcase season, it did bring a crowd of 7,727 to the MTS Centre.

=== 2008 and 2009 seasons ===
In the league's inaugural season the Alliance were a road-only team due to scheduling conflicts with the MTS Centre. The team finished in last place and went inactive for the 2009 season.

=== 2010 season ===
The team changed ownership and played four of its six home games at Gateway Recreational Centre and a doubleheader at the MTS Centre on February 27. The CMISL became affiliated with the Professional Arena Soccer League (PASL-Pro) of the United States and the Alliance played four games against American teams.

== Year-by-year ==
Year	Regular season finish	Playoffs	Average Attendance	Notes
2007	Exhibition Games Only	Exhibition Games Only	7,727	Played 1 home exhibition Game
2008	4th	Did not make playoffs		Road games only
2009				Did not play
2010	4th	Did not make playoffs	291	
2011	3rd	Did not make playoffs	241	

=== Year-by-year statistics ===
Team	Games played	Wins	Losses	Draws	Series Won	Winning Percentage	Points For	Points Against	Point Differential
2007	4	0	4	0	0	.000	6	15	-9
2008	10	0	10	-	-	.000	25	71	-46
2010	12	3	9	-	-	0.25	59	85	-26
2011	12	5	7	-	-	.417	53	78	-20

== Home arena ==
The Alliance played its 2007 exhibition doubleheader at the 15,003 seat MTS Centre with an attendance of 7,727. Due to scheduling concerns the team played a road only team in 2008. After a one-year hiatus the team moved to 7 Oaks Indoor Soccer Complex in 2010 and played a doubleheader at the MTS Centre. For 2011, the team played its home games at the Gateway Recreation Centre.
