= Gary DePalma =

American soccer player

Personal information
- Date of birth: March 9, 1976 (age 50)
- Place of birth: Pittsburgh, Pennsylvania, U.S.
- Height: 5 ft 10 in (1.78 m)
- Position: Midfielder

College career
Years	Team	Apps	(Gls)
1994–1997	Virginia Wesleyan Marlins	87	(40)

Senior career*
Years	Team	Apps	(Gls)
1999–2004	Pittsburgh Riverhounds	145	(15)
1999–2001	Detroit Rockers (indoor)	55	(14)
2001–2003	Philadelphia KiXX (indoor)	80	(42)
2004–2005	Cleveland Force (indoor)	39	(11)
2006	Philadelphia KiXX (indoor)	22	(4)
- * Club domestic league appearances and goals

Gary DePalma is an American retired soccer midfielder who played professionally in the USL A-League, National Professional Soccer League and second Major Indoor Soccer League.

== Youth ==
DePalma graduated from Upper St. Clair High School. He attended Virginia Wesleyan College where he was a 1995 NCAA Division III First Team and 1997 Third Team All American soccer player. Over his four-year collegiate career, DePalma scored 40 goals and added 29 goals in 87 games.

== Professional ==
In 1999, DePalma joined the newly founded Pittsburgh Riverhounds of the USL A-League. He played for the Riverhounds through the 2004 season. In the fall of 2000, he went on trial to Polish side Lechia Gdańsk. In February 2001, the Dallas Burn had selected DePalma in the fifth round (fifty-fifth overall) of the 2001 MLS SuperDraft but waived him soon after. In addition to playing outdoor soccer with the Riverhounds, DePalma had an extensive indoor career as well. In the fall of 1999, he signed with the Detroit Rockers of the National Professional Soccer League. He spent the entire 1999–2000 season with the Rockers, but missed half of the 2000–2001 season while in Poland. The Rockers folded in 2001 and on August 21, 2001, the Philadelphia KiXX selected DePalma with the thirty-third selection of the MISL Dispersal Draft. DePalma spent two season with the KiXX, winning the 2002 championship. He did not play during the 2003–2004 indoor season. In 2004, DePalma was selected by the St. Louis Steamers in the MISL Expansion Draft, but was later dealt via a three-team deal involving Sipho Sibiya and Lee Edgerton to the Cleveland Force on June 11, 2004. The Philadelphia KiXX acquired the rights to DePalma in the 2005 MISL Dispersal Draft, but did not sign DePalma until January 5, 2006.

In July 2024, DePalma was named to the Riverhounds SC Hall of Fame.
