= America's Cup (disambiguation) =

America's Cup is an international yachting competition.

America's Cup may also refer to:

- America Baseball Cup, a baseball competition; see Copa América (baseball)
- American Cup, a defunct US soccer competition
- American Cup (gymnastics), a gymnastics competition held in the US
- America's Cup (rugby league), a rugby league football competition
- Americas Cup (golf), an amateur golf tournament played between the US, Canada and Mexico
- Volleyball America's Cup
- "America's Cup", a song by Pond from their 2021 album, 9

== See also ==
- American Cup (disambiguation)
- AmeriCup (disambiguation)
- Copa America (disambiguation)
- America's Cup yacht class
- U.S. Cup of soccer
- U.S. Open Cup of soccer
