= America's Cup yacht class =

The America's Cup class may refer to any yacht-building rule or any group of racing yachts that were built for the America's Cup sailing competition, including:

- Deed of Gift of the America's Cup, a document that governed America's Cup in 1988 and 2010 without a class
- Cubical Contents rule, tonnage and handicap rule for displacement yachts that governed the America's Cup from 1870 to 1881
- NYYC rule, formula and handicap rule for displacement yachts that governed the America's Cup from 1885 to 1887 (85 ft LWL limit)
- Seawanhaka Rule, formula and handicap rule for displacement yachts that governed the America's Cup in 1893 (85 ft LWL limit) and from 1895 to 1903 (90 ft LWL limit)
- Universal Rule, formula rule for displacement yachts that governed the America's Cup in 1920 (75 ft LWL limit) and from 1930 to 1937 (J Class 87 ft LWL limit)
- 12-metre class, formula rule for displacement yachts that governed the America's Cup from 1958 to 1987
- International America's Cup Class, formula rule for displacement yachts that governed the America's Cup from 1992 to 2007
- AC72, development class of winged catamarans that governed the 2013 America's Cup
- AC50, development class of winged catamarans that governed the 2017 America's Cup
- AC75, development class of hydrofoiling monohulls that governed the America's Cup in 2021 and 2024, and which are planned to be used for the 38th America's Cup matches.

== See also ==
- America's Cup (disambiguation)
