= CN Centre =

Multi-use indoor arena in Prince George, British Columbia

Coordinates: 53°54′16″N 122°48′7″W

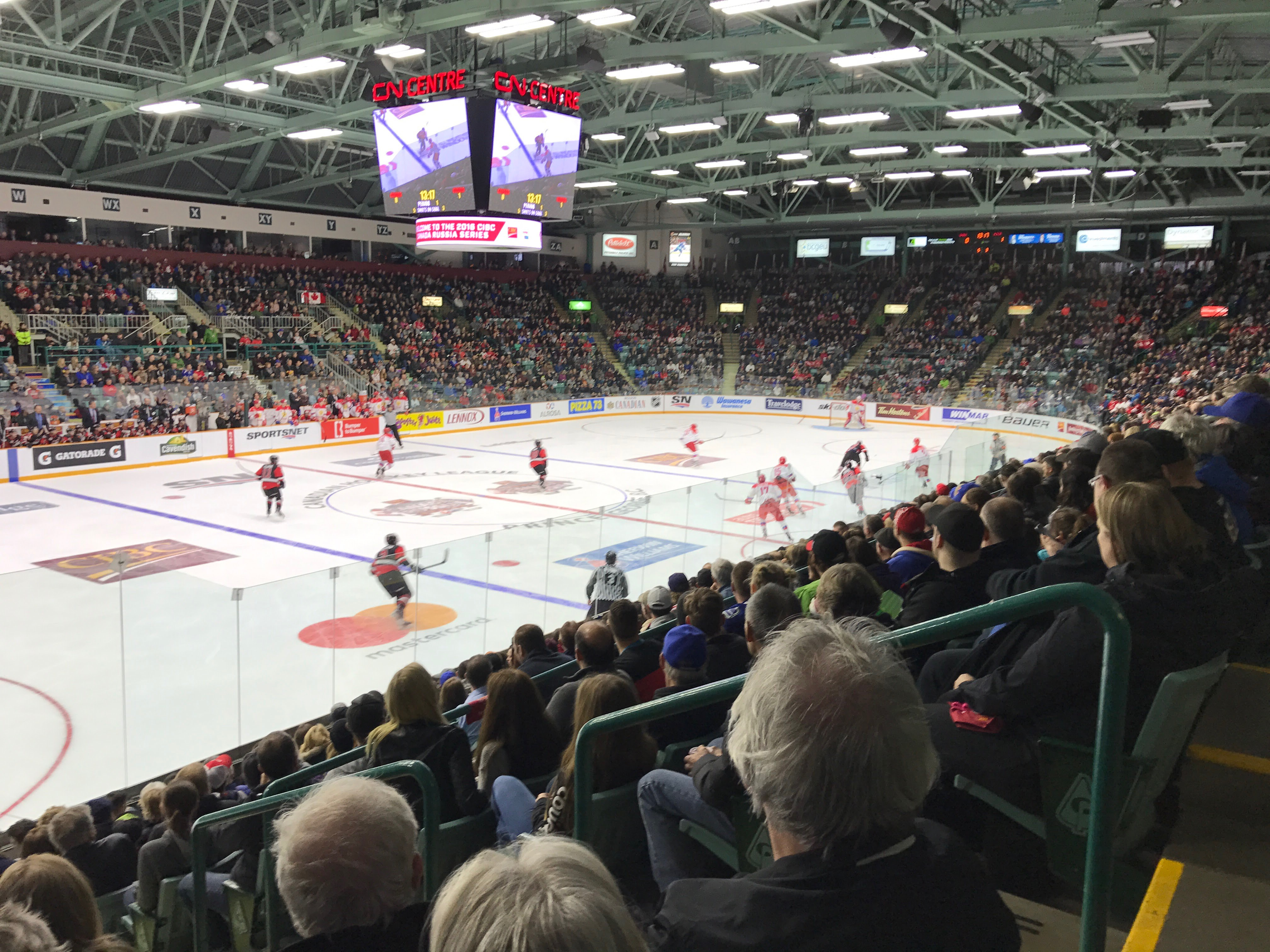
- An inside photo of the CN Centre

- Location within British Columbia Location within Canada
- Former names: Prince George Multiplex (1995–2005)
- Location: #100 - 2187 Ospika Blvd. S. Prince George, British Columbia
- Owner: City of Prince George
- Operator: City of Prince George
- Capacity: Hockey: 5,971; Concerts: 5,500

Construction
- Groundbreaking: April 1994
- Opened: September 30, 1995
- Cost: $21.7 million ($40.7 million in 2025 dollars)
- Architects: PBK Architects, Inc.
- General contractor: PCL Construction

Tenants
- Prince George Cougars (WHL) (1995–present); Prince George Fury (CMISL) (2010)

Website
- https://www.cncentre.ca/

The CN Centre is a 5,971-seat multi-purpose arena, in Prince George, British Columbia, Canada. It was designed by PBK Architects, opened in 1995 and is owned by the City of Prince George. There are 14 luxury suites. In 2005, Canadian National Railway purchased the naming rights to the building (initially known as the Multiplex).

The CN Centre is northern British Columbia's premier sports and entertainment venue, and has hosted many internationally renowned acts and entertainment. Such performers have included: Kiss, Avril Lavigne, Elton John, the Blue Man Group, Mötley Crüe, Nickelback, ZZ Top, Sarah McLachlan, Willie Nelson, Jason Aldean, Shania Twain, Bonnie Raitt, and Brooks and Dunn. Besides concerts, the CN Centre has hosted: the 2022 World Women's Curling Championship, Cirque du Soleil, David Copperfield, Ringling Brothers & Barnum and Bailey Circus, mixed martial art events, monster trucks, rodeos, and various ice skating shows.

It is home to the Prince George Cougars ice hockey team of the Western Hockey League. And in 2010, for one season, the CN Centre was the home of the Prince George Fury, of the Canadian Indoor Soccer League.

The CN Centre has a 200 ft. x 85 ft. ice surface, and is able to convert to an Olympic-sized ice surface of 200 ft. x 100 ft.

The CN Centre links with the three Kincentre arenas, creating a multi-functional four arena complex.

TicketsNorth is the official ticket supplier of CN Centre events.

In 2015, the CN Centre played an integral role as Prince George hosted the 2015 Canada Winter Games.
