= Bill Sedgewick =

American soccer player

Personal information
- Full name: William Sedgewick
- Date of birth: February 11, 1971 (age 55)
- Place of birth: Wheat Ridge, Colorado, United States
- Height: 1.83 m (6 ft 0 in)
- Positions: Defender; midfielder

College career
Years	Team	Apps	(Gls)
1990–1993	Westminster Griffins		

Senior career*
Years	Team	Apps	(Gls)
1994–1995	Portland Pride (indoor)	14	(1)
1995–1996	Chicago Power (indoor)	40	(12)
1996	Colorado Foxes	22	(0)
1996–1997	Edmonton Drillers (indoor)	40	(27)
1997–1998	Montreal Impact	51	(8)
1999–2005	Rochester Rhinos	161	(6)
2005–2006	California Cougars (indoor)	30	(5)
2006	→ Montreal Impact (loan)	5	(0)
2006–2007	Detroit Ignition (indoor)	19	(1)
2007–2008	Orlando Sharks (indoor)	21	(6)
2008	Detroit Ignition (indoor)	4	(0)
Total		407	(66)

Managerial career
- 2010–2012: Rochester Rhinos (assistant)
- 2012–2013: FC Brossard
- 2013–2014: AS Pierrefonds
- 2015–2016: Lakeshore SC
- * Club domestic league appearances and goals

William Sedgewick (born February 11, 1971) is an American former professional soccer player who played both indoors and outdoors.

== College ==
Born in Wheat Ridge, Colorado, Sedgewick attended Westminster College in Salt Lake City, graduating in 1994 with a degree in business finance.

== Player ==
In May 1994, Sedgwick turned professional with the Portland Pride in the Continental Indoor Soccer League, playing two seasons with Portland. In 1995, he moved to the Chicago Power of the National Professional Soccer League. He later played for the Edmonton Drillers, Montreal Impact and Rochester Rhinos. He returned to the Impact in 2006 for one season, on loan from the California Cougars. The Cougars folded during the summer and in September 2006, the Detroit Ignition selected Sedgewick in the MISL Dispersal Draft. In July 2007, the expansion Orlando Sharks selected Sedgewick fourth in the MISL Expansion Draft. In March 2008, he returned to the Detroit Ignition.

== Coach ==
On January 4, 2010, Sedgewick was named an assistant coach for the Rochester Rhinos. He left this position after the 2012 season to pursue opportunities in Montreal.
