= Cork United F.C. =

Cork United F.C. may refer to:

- Cork United F.C. (1940–1948), a former League of Ireland team
- Cork United F.C. (1979–1982), a former League of Ireland team
