= Prince George Fury =

- Founded: 2009
- Dissolved: 2010
- Stadium: CN Centre
- Capacity: 5,967
- League: Canadian Major Indoor Soccer League
- 2009: Did not play

The Prince George Fury were a Canadian Major Indoor Soccer League team, located in Prince George, British Columbia.

== History ==
On October 14, 2009, the CMISL announced that a new expansion club will join the league in 2010 in the form of the Prince George Fury.

== Year-by-year ==
Season	League	Won	Lost	GF	GA	Avg. attendance
2009–2010	CMISL	3	9	84	97	1,190
