= Chris Clarke (soccer) =

Canadian soccer player (born 1978)

Personal information
- Date of birth: April 6, 1978 (age 48)
- Place of birth: New Westminster, British Columbia, Canada
- Height: 5 ft 9 in (1.75 m)
- Positions: Forward; midfielder

Senior career*
Years	Team	Apps	(Gls)
1996–2000	Vancouver 86ers	37	(8)
1996–2000	Edmonton Drillers (indoor)	100	(56)
2000–2001	Buffalo Blizzard (indoor)	5	(5)
2003	Calgary Storm	3	(0)
- * Club domestic league appearances and goals

Chris Clarke is a Canadian retired soccer player. He played professionally in the USL A-League and National Professional Soccer League.

Clarke played youth soccer with Metro-Ford. In 1996, he signed with the Vancouver 86ers in the A-League. He played for Vancouver until released during the 1999 season. In April 2000, Clarke rejoined Vancouver. In the fall of 1996, Clarke joined the Edmonton Drillers of the National Professional Soccer League, playing four seasons with them. In 2000, he moved to the Buffalo Blizzard for one season. In 2003, Clarke briefly returned to professional soccer with the Calgary Storm.
