= Stampede Corral =

Multi-purpose venue in Calgary, Canada (1950–2020)

Coordinates: 51°2′15″N 114°3′18″W

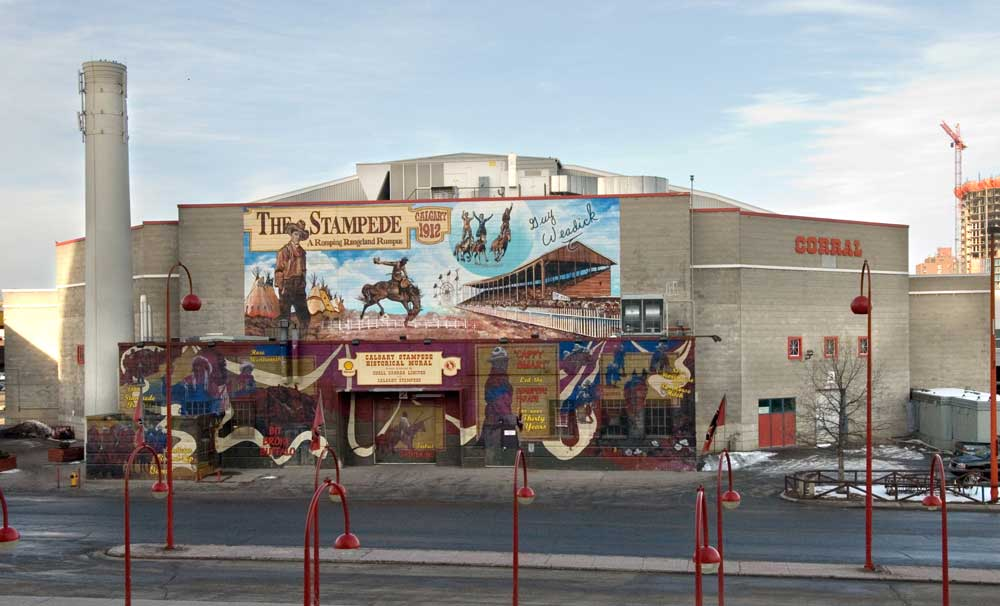
- Interactive map of Stampede Corral
- Location: 10 Corral Trail SE; Calgary, AB T2G 2W1; Canada
- Owner: Calgary Exhibition & Stampede
- Capacity: 7,475

Construction
- Opened: December 15, 1950
- Closed: 2020
- Demolished: October 2020 - March 2021

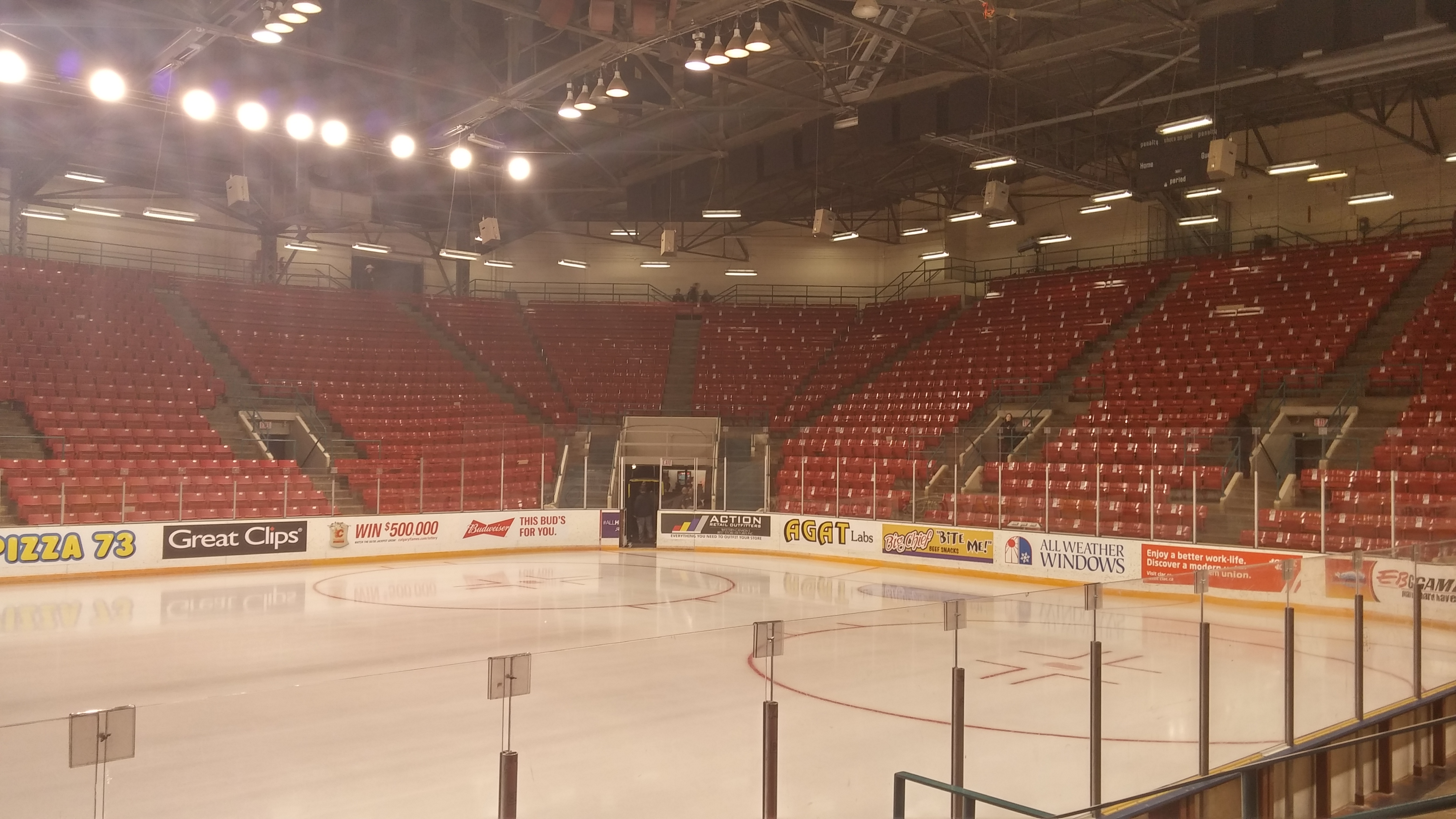
Interior of the Stampede Corral

The Stampede Corral was a multi-purpose venue (ice hockey, professional wrestling, rodeo, tennis) in Calgary, Alberta, Canada. Located on the grounds of Stampede Park, the arena was completed in 1950 at a cost of C$1.25 million ($16.4 million today) to replace Victoria Arena as the home of the Calgary Stampeders minor professional hockey club (not to be confused with the present-day Canadian Football League team of the same name), which hosted their Western Hockey League games for years. The Corral was built and owned by the not-for-profit Calgary Exhibition & Stampede organization, which leased the underlying land at $1/year from the city of Calgary. Seating 6,475, plus standing room, it was used during the annual Calgary Stampede, with a variety of entertainment events in each year's daily ENMAX Corral Show.

In March 2016, the Calgary Stampede organization announced plans to demolish the Stampede Corral to make way for a $500 million expansion of the adjacent BMO Centre. Stampede officials said that the Corral was no longer up to code, and would not have been worth the expense to renovate it. Demolition began in December 2020 and was completed in 2021.

At the time of construction, the Stampede Corral was the largest arena in Canada west of Toronto, and the first in the region without support columns obscuring the lines of sight. It was officially opened on December 15, 1950. The first hockey game was held at the Corral on December 26, as the Stampeders defeated the Edmonton Flyers 5–0 in a Western Canada Senior Hockey League game before a standing-room-only crowd of 8,729. Musicians from across the province played at the Corral in its lifespan, including Joni Mitchell, Loverboy, and Tegan and Sara.

The Stampede Corral hosted several major events, including the 1972 World Figure Skating Championships, the figure skating and ice hockey events at the 1988 Winter Olympics, as well as rodeo competitions. The Corral was also a frequent venue for the Canada Davis Cup team, with Canada holding a 5–0 all-time record in the Corral in this international tennis challenge. Most recently, Canada defeated Mexico 4–1 in the 2008 tournament.

For years, the Stampede Corral played host to special wrestling supershows promoted by Stu Hart's Stampede Wrestling, particularly during the Calgary Stampede. Stampede Wrestling is known for having featured some of the biggest names in pro wrestling history prior to its purchase by the World Wrestling Federation (now known as WWE) in 1984, including Bret Hart, Archie Gouldie, Dan Kroffat and Jake Roberts. WWE also used the Corral numerous times for non-televised house shows.

On November 21, 2016, the last Disney On Ice show was cancelled at the last minute. No reason was cited for the cancellation, although Disney offered refunds.

From April 7-8, the arena and surrounding parking lot hosted Psychopathic Records' Canadian Juggalo Weekend which featured performances from Ice-T, The 2 Live Crew, Kung Fu Vampire, Big Hoodoo, Onyx, Swollen Members, the Insane Clown Posse, and more. The event also featured professional wrestling matches from Juggalo Championship Wrestling.

The Stampede Corral housed one of Canada's most extensive private sports photo collections on public display – part of the Calgary Stampede Archives collection. A significant restoration of the photo collection, taking two years and costing over $75,000, was underway in 2016.

== Former tenants ==
Team	League	Years	Notes
Calgary Stampeders	Various	1950–72	
Calgary Centennials	WCHL	1966–77	
Calgary Cowboys	WHA	1975–77	
Calgary Wranglers	WHL	1977–87	
Calgary Boomers	NASL	1980–81	
Calgary Flames	NHL	1980–83	
Calgary 88's	WBL	1988–92	
Calgary Drillers	ABA	2004	Folded after five home games
Calgary United F.C.	CMISL	2007	
Calgary Hitmen	WHL	1995-1996, 1998, 2016 and 2019	Used as an auxiliary home to the Saddledome when unavailable or for commemorative events.

Preceded by Omni Coliseum	Home of the Calgary Flames; 1980–1983	Succeeded by Olympic Saddledome
