= Edmonton Drillers (1996–2000) =

Canadian indoor soccer team

Logo 1996-1998

Logo 1998-2000
Green/Black/White – Blue/Yellow/Red
- Founded: 1996
- Dissolved: 2000
- Stadium: Skyreach Centre; Edmonton, Alberta, Canada
- Owners: Peter Pocklington; Wojtek Wojcicki; NPSL
- GMs: Mel Kowalchuk; Zach Pocklington; Ron Knol
- Captains: Nick DeSantis; Bill Sedgewick; Kevin Holness
- Coach: Ross Ongaro
- League: National Professional Soccer League

The Edmonton Drillers, a Canadian indoor soccer team, was reconstituted in August 1996 under the ownership of Peter Pocklington. The team ("Drillers") was based at Edmonton Coliseum and played in the National Professional Soccer League. Ownership passed to Wojtek Wojcicki in 1998, and the Drillers won the NPSL National Conference in the 1998–1999 season. The franchise ended in November 2000 owing to financial difficulties.

== Resurrection ==
On August 23, 1996, at a hastily arranged press conference at Telus Field it was announced that Peter Pocklington had purchased the Chicago Power of the National Professional Soccer League and was moving them to Edmonton for the rapidly approaching 96/97 season. The team was to play out of Edmonton Coliseum and play under the name "Drillers" which had been used by the NASL entry in Edmonton many years earlier, that was also owned by Pocklington.

The acquisition was to produce further synergies between Pocklington's other sports holdings in Edmonton. Pocklington has recently negotiated control of the Coliseum, and was looking to fill dates in the building whose main tenant was his NHL team, the Edmonton Oilers. The Drillers shared office space with the Oilers, and as the NPSL season nicely juxtaposed with the baseball season it allowed for significant crossover of office staff between the Drillers and Pocklington's Pacific Coast League team the Edmonton Trappers.

Another more vindictive motivation for bringing in the indoor soccer side was to make life more difficult for the expansion Western Hockey League team, the Edmonton Ice. Pocklington had wanted a WHL franchise in Edmonton for himself, but was never granted one. However, when Ed Chynoweth stepped down as WHL commissioner, he and promptly granted a franchise in Edmonton. As a result, the Ice were not allowed to play at the Pocklington controlled Coliseum, and were instead left to play their games at the somewhat less fan friendly Northlands Agricom. On top of that it was standard practice to schedule Driller games head-to-head with Ice games, and distribute large quantities of complimentary tickets.

== Coaching and management ==
Ross Ongaro was tapped to coach the side. He had previously been a player and coach for the MISL's Cleveland Force, as well as coaching the CSL's Edmonton Brick Men. His assistants were Pasquale de Luca and Sean Fleming. Joe Petrone was chosen to be the Director of Coaching and Player Personnel. Oddly enough, Ongaro, De Luca, and Petrone had been involved with the original NASL Drillers, Ongaro and De Luca as players, and Petrone in management. De Luca left the club after the 97–98 season, but the rest remained with the club through their folding.

== '96/'97 Season ==
=== Humble beginnings ===
Not much was expected of the Drillers, nowhere more evident than in the pre-season coaches poll that had them pegged to finish 4–36. Such opinions were hardly unexpected though, as the Power were a dismal 6–34 the year prior. Even then most of the players inherited were good for little more than trade bait as the NPSL required that teams could field no more than four imports. Experienced players were very hard to come by, as not only had there not been any Canadian teams prior to provide a talent base, but there was another Canadian team entering the league that year, the Toronto Shooting Stars, and they had a head start on finding players.

When the Drillers kicked off their inaugural season they only had three players with NPSL experience. Bill Sedgewick (who was also Captain) and Nick DeSantis came with the franchise from Chicago, and Todd Rattee who was acquired from the Milwaukee Wave for Mark Manganello. The only other player with any tangible indoor experience was backup goalkeeper Scott Hileman, who had played in the rival Continental Indoor Soccer League the summer prior. It should further be noted that none of these players had more than one year of pro experience under their belt.

Heading into their first game, Pat Onstad had earned the starting goalkeeping spot, but while traveling to suit up for the Canada national team he was involved in a car accident and suffered a wrist injury which knocked him out of action for six weeks. In his stead Scott Hileman assumed the number one spot and never relinquished it.

The Drillers played their first game November 1, at Maple Leaf Gardens in Toronto. Sipho Sibiya scoring the first goal in franchise history, and the club posting their first win, 11–7 over the Shooting Stars.

Other significant happenings that season;

November 2, 1996: Drillers suffered their first loss at the hands of the Detroit Rockers, 16–9 at Joe Louis Arena.

November 17, 1996: Drillers play their home opener, dropping the contest 19–9 to the Kansas City Attack in front of a crowd of 8,974.

February 24, 1997: Acquired Domenic Mobilio from the Harrisburg Heat for cash.

=== The Stretch Run ===
As the season progressed, the Drillers experienced the steep learning curve, but managed to easily surpass the rather low expectations thrust on them to only win four games all season. With eight games to play the Drillers were still in the hunt for a playoff with a respectable 14–18 record, but were a long shot as seven of those games were on the road included a dreaded three games, in three nights, in three different cities stretch. Rather improbably the Drillers suddenly caught fire, and rattled off six wins in the seven road games and found themselves with one game to play against their division rival Detroit with a playoff spot going to the victor.

The improbable run of the Drillers had made the rounds in the media, and coinciding with the poor season the Oilers were having. Suddenly the Drillers were the flavour of the month in Edmonton. This was evident in the stands as the largest regular season crowd in Drillers history took in the regular season finale March 29, where they defeated the Rockers 7–4 in front of a boisterous 9,136 patrons. The win gave the Drillers a 21–19 record for the year, and a first round playoff date with the Milwaukee Wave.

=== Post-season ===
Riding the momentum of their late season run, on April 4 the Drillers went into Milwaukee and hammered the Wave in the first game of their best-of-three series 20–6. This game is also notable as the first game ever on the radio, as the locale station CKER agree to broadcast the playoff away games, with PR man Bruce Rakoczy and assistant coach Sean Fleming doing the play-by-play and commentary. Things did not go without a hitch though, and as a result of technical difficulties, the listening public was left listening to polka music for more than three quarters of the game before things finally got sorted out.

In the return match April 6, 9,189 fans took in probably the most memorable game in club history, seeing the Drillers rookie scoring sensation, Carmen D'Onofrio head home his own rebound past indoor legend Victor Nogueira in the final minute of play for a two-point goal, and a 10–9 victory for the home side.

After having swept the Wave, the Drillers were headed for St. Louis to face the Ambush in the second round for another best-of-three series. In game one, April 12, 1997, the Drillers had the heavily favoured Ambush on the ropes, but with 1:51 remaining in the game, Joe Reiniger hammered home a three-point goal and handing a heartbreaking 19–18 loss to the Drillers.

After sharing a quick flight back to Edmonton, the teams squared off again the next day, April 13 at Edmonton Coliseum. This game was witnessed by a record 9,879 people, and the young Drillers were not to be denied, posting a convincing 19–9 victory. This set up a winner take all showdown back in St. Louis three days later.

Game three was played on April 16, at the Kiel Center in St. Louis, and again the Drillers gave a valiant effort, and were within a goal of tying the match until midnight finally struck, and Steve Kuntz sealed their fate with an empty net goal with just seven seconds to play, final score St. Louis 16, Edmonton 11.

=== Aftermath ===
While the club was eliminated in the second round, their unexpected success was noticed, and coach Ross Ongaro was awarded the NPSL's Coach of the Year award, and the team's scoring leader, Carmen D'Onofrio, finished runner up for the leagues Rookie of the Year award. D'Onofrio, as well as Shayne Campbell and Martin Dugas were also honoured with selections of the NPSL's All-Rookie Teams.

Up until their elimination, this was the acme of the franchise, with them garnering unprecedented media coverage and drawing by far their largest crowds during their run. When earlier in the season one would be hard pressed to find more than a brief mention of the previous nights results, suddenly they were getting major linage in the major daily papers, nightly features on the TV news, and players making the rounds on local radio shows.

The late season run also was very beneficial to the team's bottom line, the team started the year with only 123 season-ticket holders were on track to lose $500,000 that season, they managed to lessen that to $300,000. Their average attendance was 7,200, but that number was largely made up of complementary tickets. Their late season run though included three consecutive 9,000+ crowds of which all were paid tickets, and thus ownership was highly optimistic heading into their second season. As it turns out, this was actually the club's most successful season financially, that is to say it's the least money they lost in one season.

=== '97/'98 Season ===
==== Sophomore jinx ====
After the terrific stretch run the first year on the field and in the stands, expectations were very high heading into the second campaign. Confidence was running high, so much so that management and players alike talked publicly about record crowds and that anything less than a championship would be a failure. Fate had other plans.

Off the field momentum was quickly stymied when owner Peter Pocklington put his sports holdings up for sale early in the offseason. With uncertainty about the club's future, ticket inquiries quickly dried up. Despite later reassurances from Pocklington that the team was "here to stay" the public remained wary. Player wise, the team remained largely intact, but did lose Nick DeSantis, Lloyd Barker and Rick Titus to the Montreal Impact when they joined the league. To fill those holes, the Drillers acquired the rights to O'Neil Brown and CISL second leading scorer, Ziad Allan.

Optimism was still abound about the on the field product heading into the season, but an 0–5 start quickly brought the team back down to Earth. Struggling particularly in the offensive end of the pitch, the Drillers shipped Allan to Montreal in a deal that eventually led to Lloyd Barker finding his way back into Driller silks. The Drillers did eventually pull out of their funk, but their season on the field and in the stands remained largely unspectacular.

Scoring goals wasn't all that irked the Drillers in their second season. After a relatively healthy inaugural season, 97/98 was filled with serious injuries to several key players. At various times the captain Bill Sedgewick, all-star defender Todd Rattee, as well as leading scorers Carmen D'Onofrio and Domenic Mobilio were out for extended periods.

==== Lloyd Barker incident ====
On March 16, 1998, it was exposed that the Drillers management had forgone getting medical insurance for their players, leading to a substantial controversy as the players had not been made aware of the situation and it was against league regulations. The situation only came to a head after the Vancouver Whitecaps inquired over the insurance situation for a player they had loaned to the Drillers, and it turned out he was uninsured. The club quickly put together an insurance package before the next night's game in Cincinnati.

It proved to be tremendously fortunate that these events had taken place, as during the 4th quarter of that game in Cincinnati Lloyd Barker attempted a bicycle kick and landed awkwardly, breaking his neck. The story of the insurance gaffe and Barker's injury became national news overnight. After surgery and several days in traction, Barker did recover from his injuries, and with the aid of a neck brace he made a tearful appearance at a game later in the season. After significant rehab Barker did eventually make a comeback, and suited up for the Detroit Rockers, though he never recaptured his earlier form.

==== Stretch Drive and aftermath ====
The Drillers did manage to squeak into the playoffs with an 18–22 record, but were quickly swept out of contention by the Kansas City Attack in the first round. Awards wise, O'Neil Brown, Paul Shepherd and Kurt Bosch were selected to the NPSL All-Rookie teams, Scott Hileman was selected as the club's MVP for the second time, Todd Rattee was Defender of the Year, and Chris Clarke was the Most Improved Player.

By time the season ended rumours concerning the Drillers future were well into circulation, and the office staff of the club was downsized as soon as the team was eliminated. There was great uncertainty about the future of the club. All that was for sure was that no ownership would have to be found for the team to continue.

In the stands, like on the pitch, results were decent but well below expectations. Average announced attendance for the season was 5,228.

=== '98/'99 Season ===
==== Eventful offseason ====
With the '97/98 season ending with a great deal of turmoil off the pitch, there were many questions about the future of the club. All that was known was that if they were going to return, it would not be under the ownership of Peter Pocklington.

Fortunately for the team, there was an ownership prospect waiting in the wings, and after spending much of the summer hammering out the deal, on August 11 Wojtek Wojcicki was officially introduced as the new owner of the indoor side.

On the field the club remained largely intact, retaining the players, coaches, and Director of Soccer Operations, Joe Petrone.

Off the field Wojcicki had a much different vision for the product, and introduced an entirely new look for the team, as well as aiming to make game days a far more family oriented outing. He himself was just a recent convert to the game, having only attended a handful of games during the prior season at the urging of his young sons.

Heading into the team made several key acquisitions on the player front, including Nikola Vignjevic, Chris Handsor, and Martin Nash. They also brought Pat Onstad back into the fold, as he experiencing something of a career resurgence after a championship outdoor season in Rochester. The Onstad move in particular was important, as the team sold two time club MVP Scott Hileman to the upstart Florida ThunderCats in September.

==== On-field success ====
When the Drillers took the field in late October, results quickly followed, a trend the continued throughout the campaign, as the Drillers were front runners for the NPSL National Conference crown all season.

There was a little bit of drama for the club when in December, Rick Titus left the team without permission to try out for a team in Hong Kong. Management later quipped that Titus (already in his second stint with the club) would never see the inside of a Drillers locker room again, and sold his rights to Philadelphia, where Titus finished out the season after returning from Asia.

Fortunately, Titus' unceremonious departure perfectly coincided with the arrival of another midfielder, Paul Dailly, who had previously played for the Wichita Wings and had been finishing up his degree before returning to pro soccer.

The Drillers success was noted by the league, and when it came time for the annual All-Star game both Pat Onstad and coach Ongaro were selected to represent the club. Onstad later withdrew due to injury, and in his stead, Chris Handsor went. As the season progressed, their winning ways continued, and with only two games remaining (both home contests against the St. Louis Ambush), the Drillers needed only one win to clinch the conference title.

After dropping game one, the Drillers found themselves not only with a bit more pressure on them for the rematch, but also without a home. As the Drillers gave up Skyreach Centre so that Shania Twain could add an Edmonton date to her tour. This forced the game to be moved across the street to the much smaller Northlands Agricom (now Edmonton Expo Centre). After getting behind early, the change of scenery didn't hurt the team in the long run though, as they posted 19–15 come from behind victory in front of an overflow crowd. The win gave the team a 23–17 record, and clinched the division and conference titles. This would also be the only home game during the Drillers four years and change that was not played at Edmonton Coliseum/Skyreach Centre, as well as the club's only conference title.

==== Early exit and the aftermath ====
After knocking off the Kansas City Attack in two games, the Drillers again found themselves in the conference final playing their old nemesis, the St. Louis Ambush. The team that also put an end to their playoff run in 96/97. The more experienced Ambush again took it to the Drillers, taking game one 16–8 in St. Louis, and completing the sweep 16–10 days later in Edmonton.

Coming off a regular season conference title, the team was obviously dejected in not going further, and this served as something of a chip of their shoulder heading into the next season. In the stands, the club experienced another solid but unspectacular year averaging 5,983 (announced), but dipped well below that during the post season, seeing only 4,638 show up for the conference final game versus St. Louis.

With attendance well below Wojcicki's target of 8,000 per game, coupled with start-up costs, reported losses for the year were in the neighborhood of $1,000,000. Despite this, Wojcicki remained positive about the prospects for the franchise heading into 99/00 and was optimistic things would improve.

When the league awards were presented, the Drillers were well represented. Martin Nash took home Rookie of the Year honours, and Ross Ongaro claiming his second Coach of the Year award in only his third season. Nash was also selected to the leagues All-Rookie team, along with Paul Shepherd.

=== '99/'00 Season ===
==== Team changes ====
While the Drillers enjoyed their first off-season without any uncertainty over their ownership, the team side management got quite active in the player market.

First they made a major four player swap with the Wichita Wings. The deal in principle was to see Drillers captain Bill Sedgewick and goalkeeper Pat Onstad head to the Wings, in exchange for defender LeBaron Hollimon, and midfielder Sterling Westcott. In actuality, there was a fair bit of underhanded dealing on both sides, as the Drillers knew that Onstad had no intention of returning to play indoor, and Wichita knew Westcott had no intention of reporting as he had agreed to a deal with a WISL club. Beyond that, Sedgewick made it clear he didn't want to play for anyone but Edmonton, and then decided to also sign with a WISL club in Utah, where he also had business interests. So, at the end of the ordeal the only player that ended up reporting was LeBaron Hollimon.

Just before the training camp commenced, the Drillers pulled the trigger on another deal that came as a shock to many. The deal saw Domenic Mobilio shipped to Philadelphia for Rick Titus, a player that only months earlier had walked out on the Drillers, and whom management had stated would never again be welcomed back. While on the surface, dealing a fan favourite and leading scorer for a guy that was considered persona non grata doesn't quite add up, the underlying issue was that Mobilio had a falling out with management which led to the deal being brokered. This would also mark the third time Titus had been acquired by Edmonton.

Other movement included signing goalkeeper Carmine Isacco, and Nebojsa Vignjevic (brother of Nikola) as free agents. On the other end of the spectrum, Martin Nash was lost as he was on trial with a European side, and long-time veteran Chris Clarke was cut in training camp.

==== Quick start ====
The Drillers came out of the gate smoking, rattling off five straight wins right out of the gate. As a team that had always prided itself on playing defense first, now had also developed a potent offense rolling three full lines. Particularly of notice in this newfound offensive stroke was the play of Nikola Vignjevic. A phenomenally gifted player, his performance in the first season (with the Drillers) was often hit and miss, but come his second season his play was inspired and gave the Drillers the playmaker they long needed up front. Another player that drastically stepped up his game for the 99/00 season was Vignjevic's line mate Rick Titus, always a tenacious defender, he too became a force in the offensive end to the surprise of many.

When December rolled around the league announced that Edmonton would host that season's All-Star game come November, a first for the franchise. The game itself was considered a fair success, with 7,853 people attending (9,123 announced), which would make it the highest actual attendance at a game since the 96/97 season. The Drillers were well represented in the game itself, with Ongaro coaching, Vignjevic, Handsor and Rattee selected to the team, and eventually Titus, Dugas, Isacco, Brown and D'Onofrio being added as replacements. On the field it was a tough night for the locals, beyond the "Team Canada" side losing the game, the Drillers also lost Martin Dugas for the remainder of the season when he went down with an ACL injury in the fourth quarter.

==== Off-field issues ====
That the Drillers inflated their announced attendance came as no surprise, as it is a common practice in pro sports, but part way through the season the degree to which the Drillers did became public and the numbers did not paint a rosy picture. It was exposed that while the club was announcing attendance in the 5,800 range, when the actual was only ~4,200. Coupled with even the announced figures falling far short of the previously stated 8,000 break even point, there were questions abound about how long Wojcicki could continue bankrolling the team.

There was also some hostility between players and management, not the least of which came to a head when Carmine Isacco was sent home by the team for no apparent reason. Speculation was that management was unhappy with how much they were paying him, and were trying to run him out of town. While not public, there was a series of disturbing occurrences behind the scenes that reinforce that speculation.

==== Momentum slows ====
According to several players, this uncertainty weighed heavily on the mind of the team and in no small way contributed to a rather pedestrian finish to the season. After starting the season strong and being ~5 games above .500 for much of the first half, the team only managed to finish the regular season 22–22.

Despite the slow finish, there were still a few bright spots in the second half. Nikola Vignjevic continued shouldering the offensive load and smashed the club record for scoring with 166 points during the campaign. The emergence of Jim Larkin after the unceremonious dumping of Isacco was also a pleasant surprise. Having no indoor-experience before suiting up, Larkin had several excellent outings and laid the groundwork for a long and successful NPSL/MISL career.

The Drillers again qualified for the playoffs, and even posted a first round upset sweep of the favoured Kansas City Attack, earning themselves a ticket to their second straight conference final. Once there though the Milwaukee Wave made short work of the Drillers, winning the best-of-three in two straight, 13–7 and 14–4.

==== Aftermath ====
Attendance did not improve as the season progressed, in fact, it got much worse, averaging an announced 5,703. The two playoff games drew 2,836 and 3,340 respectively, even after the team launched their SOS (Save Our Soccer) campaign late in the season. Losses for the season were pegged in the $500,000 range. This led too many wondering if there would be a next season, or if the owner would just pull the plug.

=== '00/'01 Season ===
==== Tumultuous off-season ====
With uncertainty abound after a disappointing playoffs on the field, and even more so in the stands, there were a great deal of questions surrounding the club and their future. Whether they would even field a team for the upcoming season was subject to much speculation.

That question was answered June 19, when the owner did insure a new line of credit with the league for the upcoming season. The optimism of this news was somewhat mitigated though by other news that same day. That being that the club had failed to pay bonuses to six key players, and was in danger of them all becoming free agents as a result. Eventually that situation too was settled, and the players all remained with the team.

The next major happening that summer was in July with the announcement that GM Ron Knol was leaving the team to pursue other interests. This was a major blow to the internal workings of the club, as he was instrumental in what few bright spots the team had off the field, including negotiating a favourable lease for Skyreach Centre.

As fall neared, there was some optimism around the team though. On the player front, the Drillers resigned several key players to new, lucrative deals. Beyond that, it was also announced that 98/99 NPSL Rookie of the Year, Martin Nash, would be returning to the team, and he would be joined by Canada national team teammate, Jeff Clarke. On the pitch, the team looked stronger than ever.

==== Drillers Investors Group ====
Off the field, things also looked to be improving when in September it became public that there was a movement afoot to erect a consortium of investors to take over ownership of the team. This group was modeled after the Edmonton Investors Group which took ownership of the Edmonton Oilers two years earlier, was to be called the Drillers Investors Group, and was headed by well-known local entrepreneur, Lyle Best.

The structure of the group was to see the club's ownership to be broken into 60 units. Wojcicki would retain 20 for himself, and the other 40 were to be purchased by other parties, including Best, as well as some of the local soccer associations. At one time it was rumoured that there were as many as 18 different parties involved in DIG. This was incorrect as only ten bona fide members of the group existed.

Come late October, and with the season rapidly approaching, DIG chose not to go forward with the offer to buy the team. Differences between Wojcicki and the others about control over operations of the team were part of the problem. DIG at one time even offered to buy the team outright from Wojcicki, but an agreed upon price could not be achieved. This due in large part to the group being unable to verify the finances of the club. The newly appointed commissioner of the league flew to Edmonton and met with Best in a last-ditch attempt to have the group move forward with the purchase however no positive resolution could be made. Thus, Wojcicki would go into the season financing the club alone.

==== Attendance falls ====
On the field, the team started very well, rattling off three straight wins to start the season. Off the field, things were another story, with attendance continuing to spiral. The first two games of the season drew 3,527 and 3,020 respectively.

Signs of trouble were present even before the disappointing crowds filtered into their seats, as it was very apparent the team was cutting costs left and right. Not only was the pre-game video presentation done away with, but the board itself was not even turned on for the game. Advertising on the boards and field were for the most part bare, and the uniforms themselves clearly looked to be done on the cheap.

After five games the team found itself at a respectable 3–2, but just two weeks into the season, their worlds were about to unravel.

==== League takes over ====
On November 15, 2000, Wojcicki failed to make payroll for the first pay period of the season, and as such defaulted ownership of the club to the league. This news was greeted bitterly by the players, who just days early had been repeatedly ensured by the owner himself that everything would be fine.

The NPSL stepped up and said they would float the team for two weeks in an effort to find new owners to take over. The players voted to continue playing for the period under the condition that the rest of the Drillers staff also get paid what was owing to them.

Despite, and perhaps in response to, the off field turmoil, the team returned to the field just days later and played inspired, rattling off consecutive victories over the defending NPSL champion, Milwaukee Wave. The crowds were far better for these two games, 6,800 and 9,329, but these were heavily papered by tickets given away just before the 15th.

The Drillers then took to the road for two games, knowing not if they would return. After dropping the first game of the trip in Kansas City, the Drillers headed into Wichita to play what would turn out to be their final game on November 25. The obviously emotional team was down early, but come back in a very big way and with a resounding fourth quarter posted a 23–14 win over the Wings.

With the win, the team ran their record to 6–3, good enough for first overall in the NPSL.

==== Denouement ====
On the afternoon of November 30, 2000, the NPSL officially pulled the plug on the Drillers franchise. After two weeks of trying to find suitable local ownership, it became very apparent that there were no takers willing to absorb the substantial losses that would be encountered as a result of taking over the club at this point.

A firestorm of media coverage ensued, including nationwide coverage on television and in print, as well as front-page stories in local major dailies. The story continued to be followed at this level for a number of days following.

On December 4, a dispersal draft took place to allot the players to new teams. The draft went as follows;

- Detroit Rockers selected – Martin Nash, Paul Dailly and Carmen D'Onofrio
- Harrisburg Heat selected – Kurt Bosch and Nikola Vignjevic
- Buffalo Blizzard selected – Alfredo Valente and Rick Titus
- Wichita Wings selected – Jim Larkin and Damir Jesic
- Kansas City Attack selected – Chris Handsor and LeBaron Hollimon
- Philadelphia Kixx selected – Kevin Holness and Geordie Lyall
- Cleveland Crunch selected – Todd Rattee
- Milwaukee Wave selected – Sipho Sibiya
- Baltimore Blast selected – Jeff Clarke
- Martin Dugas, Tiarnan King, Eric Munoz and Paul Shepherd were not drafted.

There were several issues concerning the handling of the drafts and player contracts;

- Dailly and Nash initially said they would not report to Detroit, but both relented after the Rockers offered them contracts more to their liking. Detroit also signed Dugas as a free agent.
- Hollimon was drafted under the premise of as expired contract that was for less money than he was supposed to make. A compromise was reached, and he did report.
- Larkin, Handsor, Vignjevic (who Harrisburg immediately traded to Cleveland) and Sibiya all reported without incident.
- Nine other players elected not to report to their new clubs at all.

=== Year-by-year ===
Season	GP	W	L	Pct	PF	PA	Finish	Playoffs	Avg. attendance
1996–97	40	21	19	.525	538	475	2nd in Div.	Lost in Conf. Semifinal	7,244
1997–98	40	18	22	.450	428	418	2nd in Div.	Lost in Conf. Quarterfinal	5,228
1998–99	40	23	17	.575	497	439	1st in Conf.	Lost in Conf. Final	5,983
1999–2000	44	22	22	.500	546	550	2nd in Div	Lost in Conf. Final	5,547
2000–01	9	6	3	.667	120	135	Folded mid-season		
Grand totals	173	90	83	554	2129	2017			
