= Calgary United F.C. =

Canadian soccer team

Calgary Sports and soccer team
- Founded: 2007
- Dissolved: 2012
- Stadium: Subway Soccer Centre
- League: Canadian Major Indoor Soccer League
- 2009: 2nd

Calgary Sports and soccer team. is one of four (Calgary, Edmonton, Saskatoon and Winnipeg) of Canada's newest professional soccer teams participating in the Canadian Major Indoor Soccer League.

== Notable coaches ==
- Troye Flannery (2010)
- Dave Randall (2009)
- Jamey Glasnovic (2008)

== Year-by-year ==
Year	Regular season finish	Playoffs	Average Attendance
2007	Exhibition Games Only	Exhibition Games Only	1,850
2008	2nd	Lost in Final to Edmonton	300
2009	2nd	Lost in Final to Edmonton	92
2010	1st	Lost in Quarterfinals to California	209
2011	1st	Lost in Quarterfinals to PPM Sidekicks del Estado de Mecxico	?
2012	2nd	Lost in Final to Edmonton	?

=== Year-by-year stats ===
Team	Games played	Wins	Losses	Draws	Series Won	Winning Percentage	Points For	Points Against	Point Differential
2007	4	2	2	0	1	.500	9	6	+3
2008	10	8	2	-	-	.800	72	38	+34
2009	16	8	8	-	-	.500	109	84	+21
2010	10	8	2	-	-	.800	79	32	+47
2011	12	8	4	-	-	.667	68	52	+16

== Home arena ==
Calgary United's first home was the 6,475-seat Stampede Corral, an ice hockey and rodeo arena that is also used in the annual Calgary Stampede. Beginning with the 2008 season, Calgary United moved to the Subway Soccer Centre.

== Honours ==
- Cardel Cup Champions - 2008
