= Servus Credit Union Place =

Coordinates: 53°38′40″N 113°34′28″W

Servus Credit Union Place (or Servus Place for short) is a $43-million multipurpose leisure centre that opened on September 30, 2006 in St. Albert, Alberta. At 320,000 square feet (30,000 m^{2}), Servus Place includes three NHL-sized arenas, an aquatic centre, fitness centre, indoor playground, leisure ice surface, three gymnasium courts, two field houses, a teaching kitchen, plus food service outlets (Booster Juice, Skybox Grill (formerly Don Cherry's), Starbucks (formerly Mootastic), and formerly a Source for Sports. It is a competitor to the Millennium Place in Sherwood Park, and TransAlta Tri Leisure Centre in Spruce Grove.

The three NHL-sized arenas include the 2,023-seat Performance Arena, formerly home of the St. Albert Steel ice hockey team of the Alberta Junior Hockey League and the Edmonton Drillers of the Canadian Major Indoor Soccer League.

The two other rinks include Mark Messier Arena, named in honour of St. Albert's famous son and hockey star Mark Messier, and Troy Murray Arena, named after Troy Murray the former NHLer from St. Albert. The Mark Messier/Troy Murray Arenas were part of the original twin Campbell Arenas, which were expanded to build the present-day Servus Place.

Due to the significant cost, the decision to build Servus Place (formerly called the St. Albert Multi Purpose Leisure Centre) was put to residents in a plebiscite during the 2004 civic election. Nearly 55% of residents who cast a ballot voted in favour of building the leisure centre. The facility was supposed to be operationally self-sufficient by late 2008.

In December 2007, just 14 months after opening, it was revealed that Servus Place would lose $2.2 million in its first full year of operations.

== Gallery ==
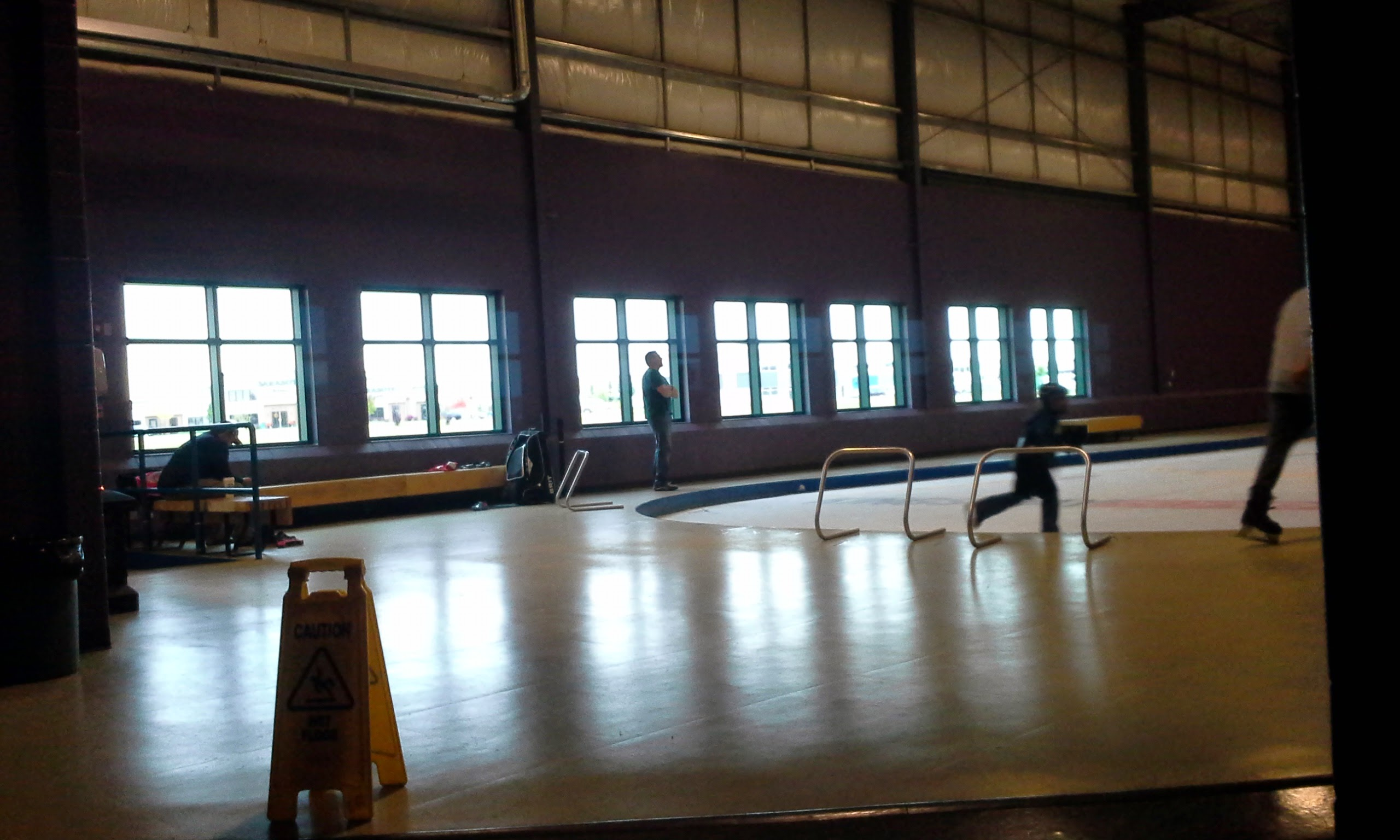
Ice skating rink in 2014

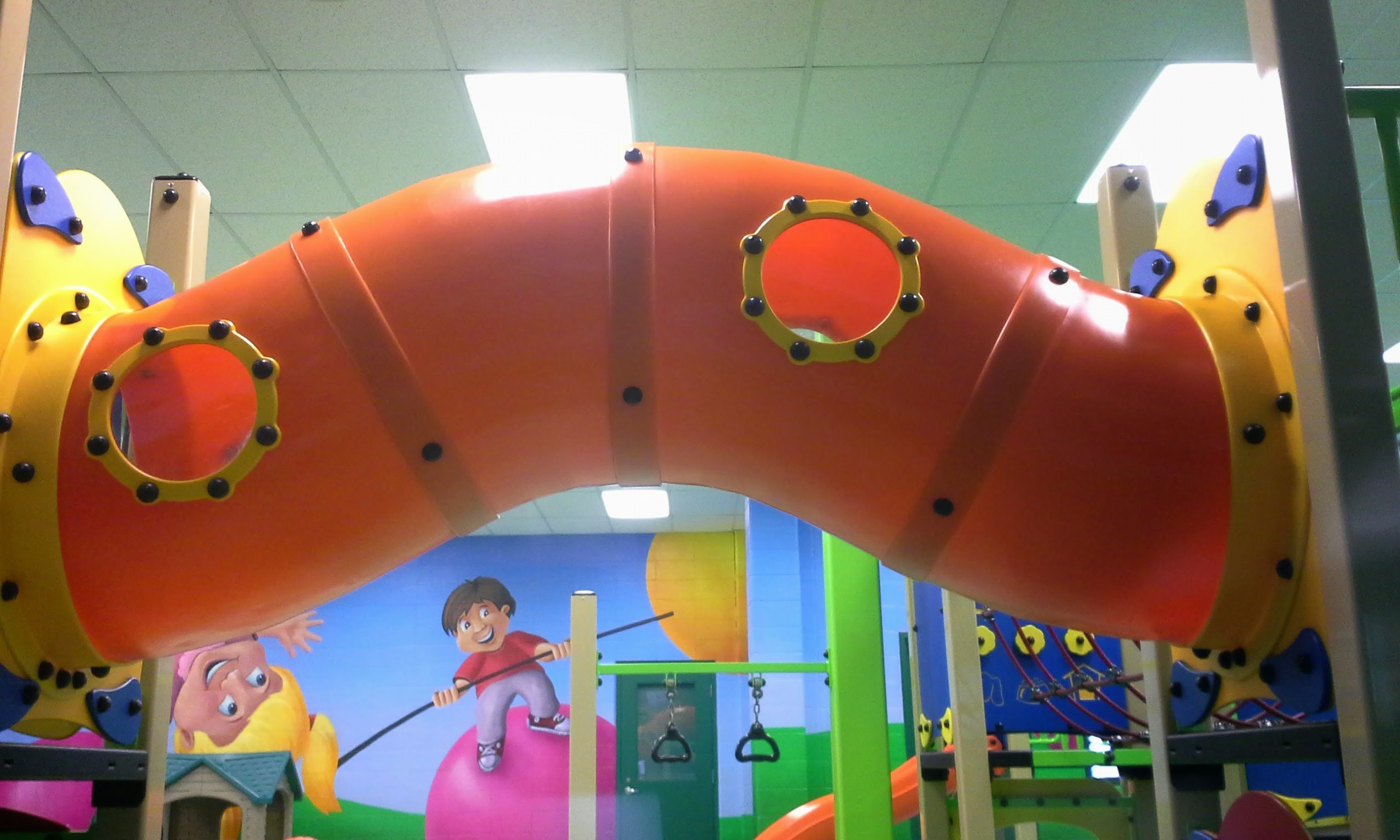
Playground in 2014

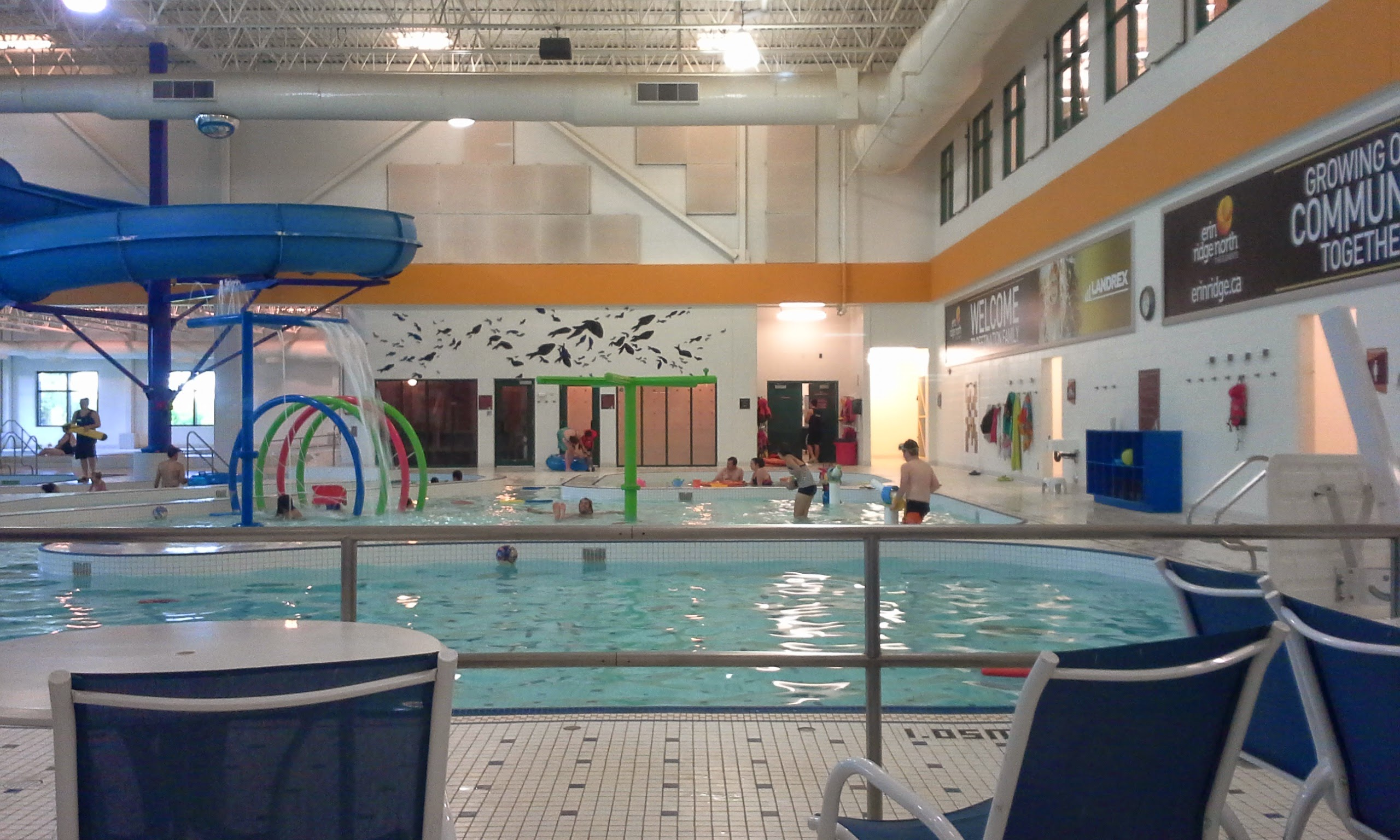
Pool in 2014
