= Canadian Major Indoor Soccer League =

Canadian professional indoor soccer league

- Sport: Indoor soccer
- Founded: 2007
- First season: 2008
- Folded: 2014
- Owner: Mel Kowalchuk (2007–2014)
- No. of teams: 2 (2012)
- Country: Canada
- Last champion: Edmonton Drillers
- Most titles: Edmonton Drillers (3)

The Canadian Major Indoor Soccer League or CMISL was a professional indoor soccer league that began full league play in January 2008. The league's president was Mel Kowalchuk.

As the league became affiliated with the Professional Arena Soccer League in the United States, the Edmonton Drillers and Saskatoon Accelerators played four soccer games and the Calgary United FC played eight games against the PASL teams in 2009. Edmonton and Saskatoon played two home games and two road games and Calgary played four home games and four road games against PASL teams. In the CMISL portion of the schedule each team played eight games. This saw Edmonton play six home games and two road games, Saskatoon play two home games and six road games and Calgary play six home games and two road games. The Winnipeg Alliance FC sat out the 2009 season, but rejoined for the 2010 season. In addition, a new expansion club joined the league in 2010 in the form of the Prince George Fury.

The league shrank to just three teams (Calgary, Edmonton, and Winnipeg) in 2011 then just two teams (Calgary and Edmonton) in 2012. The league announced a hiatus for 2013 and had planned return for 2014, but never did.

== History ==
On January 23, 2007, the CMISL issued its first major announcement disclosing its charter franchises in Calgary, Edmonton, Winnipeg, and Saskatoon.

The press release announced that each member franchise would play year round, in both indoor and outdoor professional leagues.

=== 2007 season ===
For 2007, the CMISL played a "Showcase Season" or an exhibition schedule to create interest and test the markets.

The first match of the "Showcase" was held on March 10, 2007, at the Stampede Corral in Calgary and was played between the Edmonton Drillers and Calgary United FC, while the final match was played on April 1 in Winnipeg, at the MTS Centre, between Edmonton and the Winnipeg Alliance FC. In all, each CMISL franchise held a home doubleheader, leading to an uneven number of games between the teams. Edmonton played the most with six games played, as they were the road team for three of the four doubleheaders. The Saskatoon Accelerators on the other hand played only two games, as they did not play a single road game.

=== 2008 season ===
The CMISL released its 2008 schedule via press release on October 25, 2007, and held an accompanying press conference at Servus Place in St. Albert, Alberta. The league kicked off its inaugural season on January 19, 2008, with a tournament involving all the teams, hosted by Calgary United FC at the Stampede Corral in Calgary.

A "showcase" match had been scheduled for December 1 and 2, 2007, between the Edmonton Drillers and the Prince George FC, but on November 10, the series was rescheduled to April 5 and 6, 2008. The game was played in Prince George, British Columbia, at the CN Centre. Four other pre-season exhibition games were scheduled between the Edmonton Drillers and Saskatoon Accelerators. Two of these games were held in St. Albert at the Servus Place and two were held in Saskatoon at the Credit Union Centre. All were held between December 28, 2007, and January 6, 2008.

=== 2009 season ===
As the league became affiliated with the Professional Arena Soccer League (PASL) in the United States, the Edmonton Drillers and Saskatoon Accelerators played four soccer games and the Calgary United FC played eight games against the PASL teams. Edmonton and Saskatoon played two home games and two road games and Calgary played four home games and four road games against PASL teams. In the CMISL portion of the schedule each team played eight games. This saw Edmonton play six home games and two road games, Saskatoon play two home games and six road games and Calgary play six home games and two road games.

The playoffs featured the CMISL champion taking part in an interlocking championship with the winners of the PASL and the winner of the Mexican Liga Mexicana de Futbol Rapido.

=== 2010 season ===
The 2009–08 Canadian Major Indoor Soccer League season saw the reactivation of the Winnipeg Alliance FC and the expansion of the Prince George Fury. Each team played 4 games against teams from the PASL in the United States. The season consisted of 12 soccer games total. The Edmonton Drillers, Saskatoon Accelerators, Prince George Fury and Winnipeg Alliance FC played 6 home games and the Calgary United FC played 7 due to playing American teams.

=== 2011 season ===
Calgary United FC won the league championship in the three-team league.

=== 2012 season ===
With only two teams in the league for the 2012 season, the Edmonton Drillers visited the Calgary United FC for a one-game season and league championship game at the Genesis Wellness Centre on April 21, 2012. Edmonton defeated Calgary 6–3.

=== 2013 season ===
The league was on hiatus for 2013, planned to return in 2014, but never did. League president Mel Kowalchuk cited health concerns for the failure to recruit additional teams for 2013.

=== 2014 season ===
The CMISL did not return to play for the 2014 season due to the failure to recruit other teams throughout Canada and with the health concerns of Mel Kowalchuk.

== Scheduled format ==
All games were played every Saturday and started exactly at noon. This allowed the players to free up their schedule.

- January (pre season)
- February (regular season/indoor)
- March (regular season/indoor)
- April (off season)
- May (regular season/outdoor)
- June (regular season/outdoor)
- July (post season, playoffs/outdoor)
- August (off season)
- September (regular season/indoor)
- October (regular season/indoor)
- November (post season, playoffs/indoor)
- December (off season)

== CMISL teams ==
Team locations

=== Teams ===
Team	City	Established	Home arena	Notes
Calgary United F.C.	Calgary, Alberta	2007	Subway Soccer Centre	Moved to Subway Soccer Centre from Stampede Corral for the 2008–09 season.
Edmonton Drillers	Edmonton, Alberta	2007	Edmonton Soccer Centre South	Moved to St. Albert's Servus Centre from Rexall Place for the 2008 season. Moved to Edmonton Soccer Centre South in 2010
Prince George Fury	Prince George, British Columbia	2009–2010	CN Centre	
Saskatoon Accelerators	Saskatoon, Saskatchewan	2007–2010	Credit Union Centre/Henk Ruys Soccer Centre	Moved from Credit Union Centre to Henk Ruys Soccer Centre for the 2010 season.
Winnipeg Alliance FC	Winnipeg, Manitoba	2007–2011	7 Oaks Indoor Soccer Complex/MTS Centre (for 2 games)	Due to arena scheduling concerns, the Alliance were a road-only team for the 2008 season. The Alliance sat out the 2009 season, and returned for the 2010 season.

== CMISL Champions ==
Season	Team	Notes
2007	No champion crowned	The CMISL played what they termed a "Showcase Season" consisting of a series of exhibition games
2008	Edmonton Drillers	Edmonton defeated Calgary United FC 8–7 on March 13, 2008
2009	Edmonton Drillers	CMISL became a division of the PASL-Pro
2010	Calgary United	8 wins, 2 losses (lost to California in quarter-finals)
2011	Calgary United	After winning the championship, the team's home field was damaged.
2012	Edmonton Drillers	Edmonton defeats Calgary 6–3. This was the only game of the season.

== Rules ==
The pitch was a regular sized hockey rink with artificial turf placed on it. The goals were 8 feet (2.4 m) high and 14 feet (4.3 m) wide. Unlike previous years, all goals were worth one point.

Teams consisted of six players, including the goalkeeper, on the floor at any one time. The players were changed on the fly, like in ice hockey. Also like hockey, at times teams were required to play one or even two players short. These situations were a result of a player being shown a blue card. A blue card required the offending player to serve a two- or four-minute penalty depending on the severity of the offence.

A single game was composed of four 15-minute quarters. In the few instances where doubleheaders were scheduled, the games were shortened to two 20-minute halves. During exhibition matches if the teams were tied at the end of the regulation time, a penalty shootout occurred to determine the winner.
