= Calgary Soccer Centre =

Indoor soccer facility in Alberta, Canada

- The Soccer Centre
- Interactive map of Calgary Soccer Centre
- Location: Calgary, Alberta
- Coordinates: 50.99242°N 113.96147°W
- Owner: The City of Calgary

Construction
- Built: 1992
- Opened: 1992

The Calgary Soccer Centre is an indoor soccer facility located in Calgary, Alberta. The soccer centre is owned and operated by the City of Calgary. The centre is a prime venue for many minor soccer teams in Calgary.

== History ==
On Monday, November 22, 2010, the Soccer Centre's expansions (known most commonly as "the bubble") collapsed for the second time in two years. According to Perry Logan, the general manager at the time, the collapse was most likely caused by a supporting anchor collapsing before carving a rip in the material. Nobody was inside the bubble and therefore no one was injured in the incident.

In 2014, the City of Calgary built a permanent second building (the Annex) to replace the previous structure (the "bubble"). The Annex houses four indoor soccer fields.

== Sports ==
The Calgary Soccer Centre also supports many other sports other than indoor and outdoor soccer, some of which would include field hockey, softball, football, lacrosse, lawn bowling, rugby football, and simply jogging, walking or running. The CSC also is the home venue for sports tournaments such as Jumpstart and the Canada Day lacrosse tournament.

== Information ==
The Soccer Centre is located in the Southeast sector of Calgary, and the office is open on weekdays from 8:30 AM to 3:30 PM. There is also a lounge and sandwich shop.
