= Edmonton Drillers (2007–2010) =

Canadian indoor soccer team

- Founded: 2007
- Dissolved: 2010
- Stadium: Edmonton Soccer Centre South
- Chairman: Dr. Brent Saik
- Coach: Kevin Poissant
- League: Canadian Major Indoor Soccer League
- 2009: 1st

The Edmonton Drillers were a Canadian Major Indoor Soccer League team.

== History ==
On January 24, 2007, the formation of the Canadian Major Indoor Soccer League was announced along with that a series of exhibition games would take place in various markets to gauge interest. Edmonton being one of these markets, the Edmonton Drillers name has been acquired with the expectation of several of the players from the NPSL edition of the club would be reunited for these exhibition matches.

The Showcase Series games were held at Rexall Place. However, the Drillers have moved to the Servus Credit Union Place in St. Albert for the 2008 season. The 2008 CMISL season will see the Drillers kick off January 19 and 20 with games against Saskatoon, Winnipeg and Calgary, all played in Calgary. Prior to that they will play two exhibition games in Prince George, BC, December 1 and 2, as well as a four pre-season games against Saskatoon in December and early January. CMISL is teaming up the PASL for the 2008/09 season. All 4 teams from the CMISL will be a part of the PASL 2008/09 season.

=== Notable coaches ===
- 2007-2009: Martin Dugas
- 2009: Todd Rattee

=== Staff ===
Management

- Dr. Brent Saik - President/General Manager
- Brenda Martin - Business/Ticket Manager
- Vikki Saik - Account Executive
- Jim Martin - Spokesman
- Hamish Black - Manager of Soccer Operations

Sports

- Kevin Poissant - Head Coach
- Jeff Paulus - Assistant Coach
- Sean Sneddon - Equipment Manager

== Notable players ==
(Canada)

- Brett Chartrand
- Martin Dugas
- Sean Fraser
- Kevin Glass
- Dominic Oppong
- Eric Pinnell
- Todd Rattee

(Chile)

- Eric Munoz

(Democratic Republic of the Congo)

- Amuri Kapongo

(Croatia)

- Phil Pavičić

(Czech Republic)

- Freddy Malek

(Greece)

- Joseph Costouros

(Hungary)

- Tristian Ilko

(Croatia)

- Oliver Brkin

(India)

- Harman Braich

(Italy)

- Angelo Sestito

(Romania)

- Paul Roncov

(Serbia)

- Nikola Vignjević

(Ukraine)

- Jarin Myskiw
- Sean Myskiw

== Year-by-year ==
Season	GP	W	L	Pct	PF	PA	Finish	North American Championship	Avg. attendance
2007	6	4	2	.667	13	11	2nd	N/A	3,730
2008	10	8	2	.800	73	39	1st	N/A	606
2009	12	9	3	.750	82	82	1st	lost in the semi-finish	
2010	12	5	7	.417	84	72	3rd	Did not qualify	192
