= 2011 FC Edmonton season =

FC Edmonton
2011 season
- Owners: Dave Fath; Tom Fath
- Head Coach: Harry Sinkgraven
- NASL: Quarterfinals
- Canadian Championship: Semifinals
- Top goalscorer: Shaun Saiko (9 goals)
- Highest home attendance: 5,781 (27 Apr v. Toronto)
- Lowest home attendance: 797 (15 Jun v. Puerto Rico)
- Average home league attendance: League: 1,816; All: 2,081
Home colours	Away colours

The 2011 NASL season was the first official season in FC Edmonton's existence. The club had played an exhibition season consisting of friendlies against various domestic and international opponents in 2010.

== Club ==
=== Coaching staff ===
Position	Staff
General Manager	(United States) Tom Liep
Head Coach	(Netherlands) Harry Sinkgraven
Technical Coach	(Canada) Dave Randall
Assistant Coach	(Netherlands) Edwin Petersen

Last updated: April 3, 2011
Source: FC Edmonton

== Squad ==
As of October 1, 2011

Note: Flags indicate national team as defined under FIFA eligibility rules; some limited exceptions apply. Players may hold more than one non-FIFA nationality.

No.	Pos.	Nation	Player
1	GK	NED	Rein Baart
2	DF	CAN	Adrian LeRoy
3	DF	USA	Jeffrey Quijano
4	DF	CAN	Alex Surprenant
5	DF	CAN	André Duberry
6	MF	CAN	Shaun Saiko
7	FW	CAN	Alex Semenets
8	DF	CAN	John Jonke
9	FW	CAN	Chris Lemire
10	MF	CAN	Kyle Yamada
11	FW	CAN	Paul Craig
12	DF	CAN	Niko Saler
13	FW	TTO	Conrad Smith
14	DF	NED	Paul Matthijs
15	MF	USA	Shawn Chin

No.	Pos.	Nation	Player
16	MF	CAN	Eddy Sidra
17	MF	ZAM	Mutanda Kwesele
18	DF	CAN	Paul Hamilton
19	FW	CAN	Michael Cox
20	MF	CAN	Chris Kooy (captain)
21	MF	CAN	Dominic Oppong
22	FW	USA	Dan Antoniuk
23	GK	USA	Lance Parker
24	DF	CAN	Antonio Rago
25	GK	CAN	Jas Gill
26	GK	CAN	David Monsalve
27	MF	CAN	Sam Lam
28	MF	NED	Ilja van Leerdam
29	FW	CAN	Kyle Porter
—	MF	CAN	Matthew Lam (on loan to JEF United)

=== Transfers ===
==== In ====
Date	Player	Position	Previous club	Fee/notes	Ref
January 14, 2011	(Canada) Robbie Tice	MF	(Norway) FK Bodø/Glimt 2	Off-season trialist	
January 14, 2011	(Canada) Jimmie Mayaleh	MF	(Canada) Thunder Bay Chill	Off-season trialist	
February 28, 2011	(Canada) Niko Saler	DF	(Canada)		
March 1, 2011	(Canada) Jaswinder Gill	GK	(Canada) Alberta Golden Bears		
March 1, 2011	(Canada) Antonio Rago	DF	(Canada) Alberta Golden Bears		
March 3, 2011	(Canada) Paul Craig	FW	(Canada) Saskatchewan Huskies		
March 3, 2011	(Canada) Dominic Oppong	MF	(United States) Harrisburg City Islanders		
March 3, 2011	(Canada) Alex Surprenant	DF	(Canada) Montreal Impact		
March 5, 2011	(Canada) Jerome Baker	MF	(Canada) Vancouver Whitecaps		
March 5, 2011	(Canada) Alex Semenets	FW	(Canada) Vancouver Whitecaps		
March 7, 2011	(Canada) John Jonke	DF	(Canada) SC Toronto		
March 7, 2011	(United States) Dan Antoniuk	FW	(United States) San Diego Sockers	Training camp trialist	
March 10, 2011	(Canada) Will Beaugé	FW	(Canada) Ottawa Fury	Training camp trialist	
March 10, 2011	(United States) Shawn Chin	MF	(United States) South Florida Bulls		
March 10, 2011	(United States) Lance Parker	GK	(United States) Miami FC		
March 10, 2011	(Wales) Shaun Pejic	DF	(United States) Crystal Palace Baltimore	Training camp trialist	
March 12, 2011	(Canada) Eduardo Denali	FW	(Canada)	Training camp trialist	
March 16, 2011	(United States) Dan Antoniuk	FW	(United States) San Diego Sockers	Signed to a contract	
March 22, 2011	(Trinidad and Tobago) Conrad Smith	MF	(Trinidad and Tobago) Joe Public FC		
March 27, 2011	(Canada) Sam Lam	MF	(Canada) FC Edmonton	Re-signed	
April 2, 2011	(Canada) Eddy Sidra	MF	(Germany) Energie Cottbus		
April 3, 2011	(Canada) Kyle Porter	FW	(Canada) Vancouver Whitecaps	Trialist	
April 20, 2011	(Canada) Adrian LeRoy	DF	(Canada) Ottawa Fury		
June 26, 2011	(United States) Jeffrey Quijano	DF	(United States) Michigan Wolverines	Signed to a contract	
July 14, 2011	(Netherlands) Ilja van Leerdam	MF	(Netherlands) Helmond Sport	Signed to a contract	
July 17, 2011	(Canada) David Monsalve	GK	(Finland) FC Inter Turku	In-season Trial	
August 2, 2011	(Canada) David Monsalve	GK	(Finland) FC Inter Turku	Signed to a contract	

==== Out ====
Date	Player	Position	Destination club	Fee/notes	Ref
January 17, 2011	(Netherlands) Sander van Gessel	MF	(Japan) JEF United Ichihara Chiba		
February 7, 2011	(Canada) Matthew Lam	MF	(Japan) JEF United Ichihara Chiba	Loaned for the duration of the Japanese season	
August 1, 2011	(Wales) Shaun Pejic	DF	(England) Barrow A.F.C.		
August 2, 2011	(Canada) Justin Ammar	GK	(Canada) NAIT Ooks		

== Competitions ==
Updated as published April 9, 2011.

=== Regular season ===
==== Standings ====
Overall

Pos	Team	Pld	W	D	L	GF	GA	GD	Pts	Qualification
3	Tampa Bay Rowdies	28	11	8	9	41	36	+5	41	Playoff quarterfinals
4	Fort Lauderdale Strikers	28	9	11	8	35	36	−1	38	Playoff quarterfinals
5	FC Edmonton	28	10	6	12	35	40	−5	36 (Note: EDM: 8 pts; MIN: 2 pts)	Playoff quarterfinals
6	NSC Minnesota Stars (C)	28	9	9	10	30	32	−2	36	Playoff quarterfinals
7	Montreal Impact	28	9	8	11	35	27	+8	35	

Source: NASL Standings
Rules for classification: 1) points; 2) head-to-head record; 3) goal difference; 4) number of goals scored.
(C) Champions

== Matches ==
=== Pre-season ===
Win Draw Loss

March 7, 2011	FC Edmonton	0 – 3	FC Dallas Reserves	Casa Grande, Arizona, United States
		(report)	Luna (Villar 3'; Wiedeman 24'; Rodriguez (Leva) 60'	Stadium: Grande Sports World

March 10, 2011	FC Edmonton	1 – 1	New Mexico Lobos	Casa Grande, Arizona, United States
	Antoniuk 66'	(report)	Venter 79'; Baldinger (yellow card) 82'	Stadium: Grande Sports World

March 12, 2011	FC Edmonton	4 – 1	New Mexico Lobos	Casa Grande, Arizona, United States
	Hamilton 13'; Yamada 25'; Craig 62'; Craig 74'	(report)	Young 36' (pen.)	Stadium: Grande Sports World

March 18, 2011	FC Edmonton	6 – 1	FC Tucson	Casa Grande, Arizona, United States
	Yamada 17'; Lemire 22'; Saiko 33'; Saiko 58'; Saiko 67'; Yamada 75'	(report)	Kaufman 63'	Stadium: Grande Sports World

March 19, 2011	FC Edmonton	5 – 0	Phoenix Monsoon	Casa Grande, Arizona, United States
	Semenets 2'; Antoniuk 24'; Jonke (??); Semenets (??); Antoniuk (??)	(report)		Stadium: Grande Sports World

March 27, 2011	FC Edmonton	5 – 0	WSA Winnipeg	Winnipeg, Manitoba, Canada
	Smith 16'; Lemire 18'; Surprenant 77'; Semenets 86'; Jonke 89'	(report)		Stadium: Winnipeg Indoor Soccer Complex

April 4, 2011	FC Edmonton	6 – 2	Florida Selects	Sunrise, Florida, United States
	Lemire 2'; Antoniuk (??); Antoniuk (??); Yamada (??); Lam (??); Kooy 83' (pen.)	(report)	(??) (??)

=== North American Soccer League regular season ===
April 9, 2011	FC Edmonton	2 – 1	Fort Lauderdale Strikers	Fort Lauderdale, Florida, United States
7:30 pm EDT	Kooy (yellow card) 33'; Saiko (Surprenant) 53'; Antoniuk (Saiko) 66'; Surprenant (yellow card) 74'; Saiko (yellow card) ??'; Rago (yellow card) ??'	(report)	Lancaster (Coudet) 47' ??? (yellow card) ??' ??? (yellow card) ??'	Stadium: Lockhart Stadium; Attendance: 6,402

April 16, 2011	FC Edmonton	1 – 0	Atlanta Silverbacks	Atlanta, Georgia, United States
7:30 pm EDT	Surprenant (Saiko) 11'	(report)	Paulini (yellow card) 78'; Cox (red card) 84'	Stadium: RE/MAX Greater Atlanta Stadium; Attendance: 3,161; Referee: Patrick Baker

April 20, 2011	FC Edmonton	0 – 2	Carolina RailHawks	Cary, North Carolina, United States
7:00 pm EDT	Antoniuk (yellow card) 18'; Lam (yellow card) 28'; Surprenant (yellow card) 60'; Lemire (yellow card) 90'	(report)	Barbara 19'; Krause (yellow card) 26'; Franks (yellow card) 73'; Zimmerman 76'	Stadium: WakeMed Soccer Park; Attendance: 1,181

May 1, 2011	Montreal Impact	5 – 0	FC Edmonton	Edmonton, Alberta, Canada
9:30 pm EDT	Gerba (Kreamalmeyer) 9'; Ribeiro (yellow card) 12'; Le Gall (Tsiskaridze) 31'; Gerba (Le Gall) 36'; Le Gall (yellow card) 74'; Pizzolitto 86' (pen.); Ech-Chergui 90'	(report)	Saiko (yellow card) 31'; Baart (red card) 84'; Lemire (red card) 84'; Hamilton (yellow card) 90'	Stadium: Foote Field; Attendance: 2,651; Referee: David Barrie

May 7, 2011	FC Edmonton	2 – 0	Atlanta Silverbacks	Atlanta, Georgia, United States
7:30 pm EDT	Kooy (yellow card) 13'; Craig (Oppong) 69'; Porter (Craig) 76'		Davis (yellow card) 23'; Quintero (yellow card) 90+'	Stadium: RE/MAX Greater Atlanta Stadium; Attendance: 2,433

May 11, 2011	FC Edmonton	1 – 1	FC Tampa Bay	St. Petersburg, Florida, United States
7:00 pm EDT	Kooy (Craig) 90+'		Burt (Millien) 51'; Ambersley (yellow card) 55'; Sanfilippo (yellow card) 75'	Stadium: Progress Energy Park; Attendance: 1,775

May 23, 2011	NSC Minnesota Stars	1 – 2	FC Edmonton	Edmonton, Alberta, Canada
9:30 pm EDT	Bracalello (Rodríguez) 24'		Porter (Yamada) 26'; Matthijs (yellow card) 45'; Porter 65'; Saiko (yellow card) 69'	Stadium: Foote Field; Attendance: 2,260

May 31, 2011	FC Tampa Bay	0 – 4	FC Edmonton	Edmonton, Alberta, Canada
9:30 pm EDT			Porter (Yamada) 29'; Yamada 37'; Saiko (Cox) 85'; Chin 88'	Stadium: Foote Field; Attendance: 1,838

June 4, 2011	FC Edmonton	0 – 2	Montreal Impact	Montreal, Quebec, Canada
2:30 pm EDT	Baart (red card) 79'		Diouf (Ribeiro) 34'; Billy (Di Lorenzo) 82'	Stadium: Saputo Stadium; Attendance: 11,232; Referee: John Oliva

June 10, 2011	Carolina RailHawks	1 – 0	FC Edmonton	Edmonton, Alberta, Canada
9:30 pm EDT	Watson 53'		Hamilton (yellow card) 70'; Oppong (yellow card) 76'	Stadium: Foote Field; Attendance: 1,846

June 15, 2011	Puerto Rico Islanders	0 – 3	FC Edmonton	Edmonton, Alberta, Canada
9:30 pm EDT	Faña (yellow card) 25'		Chin (Porter) 9'; Antoniuk (Saiko) 38'; Saiko 57' (pen.)	Stadium: Foote Field; Attendance: 797

June 18, 2011	FC Edmonton	1 – 1	NSC Minnesota Stars	Blaine, Minnesota, United States
8:30 pm EDT	Saiko (Rago) 14'; Saiko (yellow card) 19'; Antoniuk (yellow card) 35'; Surprenant (yellow card) 66'; Saiko (yellow card) 85' (red card)		Stewart (yellow card) 52'; Hlavaty 55' (pen.); Davis (yellow card) 61'; Kallman (yellow card) 89'	Stadium: National Sports Center; Attendance: 1,315

June 26, 2011	Montreal Impact	0 – 1	FC Edmonton	Edmonton, Alberta, Canada
6:00 pm EDT	Lowery (yellow card) 43'; Camara (yellow card) 58'; Ribeiro (yellow card) 90'		Porter 5'; Rago (yellow card) 30'; Hamilton (yellow card) 84'	Stadium: Foote Field; Attendance: 2,306; Referee: Alain Ruch

July 4, 2011	FC Edmonton	1 – 1	NSC Minnesota Stars	Blaine, Minnesota, United States
8:30 pm EDT	Rago (yellow card) 57'; Surprenant 63'; Lemire (yellow card) 85'		Stewart (yellow card) 47'; Deldo 85'	Stadium: National Sports Center; Attendance: 1,287

July 13, 2011	Carolina RailHawks	1 – 1	FC Edmonton	Edmonton, Alberta, Canada
9:30 pm EDT	Farber 2'; Krause (yellow card) 37'; Miller (yellow card) 76'; Steele (yellow card) 78'; Krause (yellow card) 78' (red card)		Jonke (red card) 22'; Surprenant (yellow card) 42'; Yamada (yellow card) 63'; Saiko (yellow card) 74'; Saiko 76' (pen.)	Stadium: Foote Field; Attendance: 1,857

July 17, 2011	FC Tampa Bay	2 – 1	FC Edmonton	Edmonton, Alberta, Canada
6:00 pm EDT	King 30'; Sanfilippo (yellow card) 34'; Ambersley 71'		Porter (van Leerdam) 19'	Stadium: Foote Field; Attendance: 1,574

July 23, 2011	FC Edmonton	1 – 4	Carolina RailHawks	Cary, North Carolina, United States
7:00 pm EDT	Oppong (yellow card) 61'; Kooy (yellow card) 75'; Saiko (Antoniuk) 84'		Nurse (yellow card) 18'; Campos (Miller) 37'; Barbara (yellow card) 45+'; Franks (yellow card) 49'; Campos (Barbara) 67'; Hamilton 81' (own); Barbara (Farber) 86'	Stadium: WakeMed Soccer Park; Attendance: 3,034

July 27, 2011	FC Edmonton	1 – 3	FC Tampa Bay	St. Petersburg, Florida, United States
7:00 pm EDT	Semenets (Antoniuk) 28'; Lemire (yellow card) 90'		King (Millien) 6'; Hayes (yellow card) 51'; Hill 60'; Millien (Ambersley) 84'	Stadium: Progress Energy Park; Attendance: 2,003

July 30, 2011	FC Edmonton	0 – 3	Fort Lauderdale Strikers	Fort Lauderdale, Florida, United States
7:30 pm EDT	Jonke (yellow card) 45'		Shriver (Thompson) 14'; Thompson (Palacio) 29'; Arguez (yellow card) 46'; Shriver 76'	Stadium: Lockhart Stadium

August 6, 2011	Puerto Rico Islanders	1 – 0	FC Edmonton	Edmonton, Alberta, Canada
9:30 pm EDT	Emory (yellow card) 11'; Faña (yellow card) 34'; Pitchkolan 90+1'		Lemire (yellow card) 11'; Saiko (yellow card) 90'	Stadium: Foote Field; Attendance: 1,480

August 14, 2011	Fort Lauderdale Strikers	1 – 1	FC Edmonton	Edmonton, Alberta, Canada
6:00 pm EDT	Stahl (yellow card) 31'; Santamaria (Palacio) 79'; Laing (yellow card) 90'		Lemire (yellow card) 25'; Hamilton (Lemire) 30'	Stadium: Foote Field; Attendance: 1,845

August 21, 2011	Atlanta Silverbacks	0 – 3	FC Edmonton	Edmonton, Alberta, Canada
9:30 pm EDT	Ruthven (yellow card) 79'		Surprenant (yellow card) 33'; Saiko (Yamada) 63'; Cox (Oppong) 71'; Cox (Chin) 73'	Stadium: Foote Field; Attendance: 1,607

August 27, 2011	FC Edmonton	2 – 3	Puerto Rico Islanders	Bayamón, Puerto Rico
7:30 pm EDT	Saiko (van Leerdam) 28'; Duberry (yellow card) 53'; Hamilton (yellow card) 79'; Porter (Craig) 90'		Addlery (Telesford) 41'; Faña (Foley) 42'; Needham (yellow card) 50'; Needham (Emory) 90+3'	Stadium: Juan Ramón Loubriel Stadium; Attendance: 2,702

August 30, 2011	FC Edmonton	1 – 1	Puerto Rico Islanders	Bayamón, Puerto Rico
7:30 pm EDT	Cox (Saiko) 46' van Leerdam (yellow card) 77'; Hamilton (yellow card) 88'		Telesford (yellow card) 14'; Faña 52'; Telesford (yellow card) 54' (red card)	Stadium: Juan Ramón Loubriel Stadium

September 3, 2011	NSC Minnesota Stars	1 – 3	FC Edmonton	Edmonton, Alberta, Canada
9:30 pm EDT	Altman (yellow card) 24'; Cvilikas (Gotsmanov) 42'		Yamada (Porter) 56'; Saiko (Baart) 71'; Antoniuk (Rago) 90+2'	Stadium: Foote Field; Attendance: 1,823

September 7, 2011	Atlanta Silverbacks	1 – 2	FC Edmonton	Edmonton, Alberta, Canada
9:30 pm EDT	Robertson (red card) 29'; Casarona (yellow card) 58'; Ruthven (O'Brien) 75'; Hunt (yellow card) 88'		Yamada (Surprenant) 52'; Craig (Saiko) 90+4'; Craig (yellow card) 90+4'	Stadium: Foote Field; Attendance: 1,868

September 11, 2011	Fort Lauderdale Strikers	2 – 1	FC Edmonton	Edmonton, Alberta, Canada
9:30 pm EDT	Granado (yellow card) 44'; Hamilton 65' (own); Shriver 90'; Palacio (yellow card) 90+3'		Jonke (Hamilton) 45'; Saiko (yellow card) 76'; Hamilton (yellow card) 90'; Rago (yellow card) 90+2'	Stadium: Foote Field; Attendance: 1,682

September 17, 2011	FC Edmonton	0 – 2	Montreal Impact	Montreal, Quebec, Canada
7:30 pm EDT	Surprenant (yellow card) 53'; Hamilton (yellow card) 80'		Pore (Montaño) 12'; Billy (yellow card) 16'; Montaño (yellow card) 20'; Pore (Montaño) 78'	Stadium: Saputo Stadium; Attendance: 12,433; Referee: Justin Tasev

=== North American Soccer League playoffs ===
October 1, 2011 Quarter-Finals	FC Edmonton	0 – 5	Fort Lauderdale Strikers	Fort Lauderdale, Florida, United States
7:30 pm EDT	Rago (yellow card) 35'; Hamilton (yellow card) 56'; Saiko (yellow card) 67'; Hamilton (yellow card) 82' (red card)		Shriver 45+1'; Thompson (Laing) 46'; Shriver (Palacio) 51'; Shriver (yellow card) 55'; Thompson (Gordon) 61'; Thompson (Arguez) 76'	Stadium: Lockhart Stadium

=== Canadian Championship ===
April 27, 2011 Semi-Finals	Toronto FC	3 – 0	FC Edmonton	Edmonton, Alberta, Canada
8:00 pm EDT	Santos (Plata) 35'; Gordon (yellow card) 43'; Gordon 47'; Santos 61'; Santos (yellow card) 67'	(report)	Saiko (red card) 24'; Sidra (yellow card) 90+'	Stadium: Commonwealth Stadium; Attendance: 5,781; Referee: Paul Ward

May 4, 2011 Semi-Finals	FC Edmonton	0 – 1	Toronto FC	Toronto, Ontario, Canada
8:00 pm EDT		(report)	Gordon (Plata) 21'; Yourassowsky (yellow card) 60'	Stadium: BMO Field; Attendance: 17,937; Referee: Mauricio Navarro

== Squad statistics ==
=== Players ===
Last updated for match on October 1, 2011.

No.	Pos	Nat	Player	Total		North American Soccer League		Canadian Championship	
No.	Pos	Nat	Player	Apps	Goals	Apps	Goals	Apps	Goals
1	GK	(Netherlands) NED	Rein Baart	26	0	25+0	0	1+0	0
2	DF	(Canada) CAN	Adrian LeRoy	2	0	0+1	0	0+1	0
4	DF	(Canada) CAN	Alex Surprenant	21	2	19+1	2	1+0	0
5	DF	(Canada) CAN	André Duberry	5	0	2+2	0	0+1	0
6	MF	(Canada) CAN	Shaun Saiko	28	9	26+1	9	1+0	0
7	FW	(Canada) CAN	Alex Semenets	13	1	4+9	1	0+0	0
8	DF	(Canada) CAN	John Jonke	19	1	18+1	1	0+0	0
9	FW	(Canada) CAN	Chris Lemire	14	0	9+4	0	1+0	0
10	MF	(Canada) CAN	Kyle Yamada	23	3	19+2	3	2+0	0
11	FW	(Canada) CAN	Paul Craig	14	2	5+8	2	0+1	0
12	DF	(Canada) CAN	Niko Saler	6	0	5+0	0	1+0	0
13	FW	(Trinidad and Tobago) TTO	Conrad Smith	16	0	3+11	0	2+0	0
14	DF	(Netherlands) NED	Paul Matthijs	5	0	5+0	0	0+0	0
15	MF	(United States) USA	Shawn Chin	14	2	7+6	2	0+1	0
16	MF	(Canada) CAN	Eddy Sidra	8	0	6+1	0	0+1	0
17	MF	(Zambia) ZAM	Mutanda Kwesele	2	0	0+1	0	0+1	0
18	DF	(Canada) CAN	Paul Hamilton	30	1	28+0	1	2+0	0
19	FW	(Canada) CAN	Michael Cox	15	3	9+6	3	0+0	0
20	MF	(Canada) CAN	Chris Kooy	30	1	28+0	1	2+0	0
21	MF	(Canada) CAN	Dominic Oppong	24	0	21+1	0	2+0	0
22	FW	(United States) USA	Dan Antoniuk	23	3	13+9	3	1+0	0
23	GK	(United States) USA	Lance Parker	5	0	3+1	0	1+0	0
24	DF	(Canada) CAN	Antonio Rago	31	0	26+3	0	2+0	0
26	GK	(Canada) CAN	David Monsalve	1	0	1+0	0	0+0	0
26	GK	(Canada) CAN	Justin Ammar	1	0	0+1	0	0+0	0
27	MF	(Canada) CAN	Sam Lam	11	0	4+5	0	1+1	0
28	MF	(Netherlands) NED	Ilja van Leerdam	14	0	14+0	0	0+0	0
29	FW	(Canada) CAN	Kyle Porter	27	7	19+6	7	2+0	0

=== Formation ===
No.	Pos.	Nat.	Name	MS	Notes
1	GK	(Netherlands)	Baart	26	
23	GK	(United States)	Parker	4	
26	GK	(Canada)	Monsalve	1	
26	GK	(Canada)	Ammar	0	No longer with the club
2	DF	(Canada)	LeRoy	0	
4	DF	(Canada)	Surprenant	20	
5	DF	(Canada)	Duberry	2	
8	DF	(Canada)	Jonke	18	
12	DF	(Canada)	Saler	6	
14	DF	(Netherlands)	Matthijs	5	
18	DF	(Canada)	Hamilton	30	
24	DF	(Canada)	Rago	28	
6	MF	(Canada)	Saiko	27	
10	MF	(Canada)	Yamada	21	
15	MF	(United States)	Chin	7	
16	MF	(Canada)	Sidra	6	
17	MF	(Zambia)	Kwesele	0	
20	MF	(Canada)	Kooy	30	
21	MF	(Canada)	Oppong	23	
27	MF	(Canada)	Lam	5	
28	MF	(Netherlands)	van Leerdam	14	
7	FW	(Canada)	Semenets	4	
9	FW	(Canada)	Lemire	10	
11	FW	(Canada)	Craig	5	
13	FW	(Trinidad and Tobago)	Smith	5	
19	FW	(Canada)	Cox	9	
22	FW	(United States)	Antoniuk	14	
29	FW	(Canada)	Porter	21	

Last updated: October 1, 2011
Source: Squad stats and Start formations.
Only competitive matches.
Using the most used start formation.
Ordered by position on pitch (from back right to front left).

Configuration based on October 1, 2011 match

=== Disciplinary records ===
Only players with at least one card included.

Number	Position	Name	NASL Regular Season		Canadian Championship		Total	
Number	Position	Name	Yellow card	Red card	Yellow card	Red card	Yellow card	Red card
1	GK	Rein Baart	0	2	0	0	0	2
4	DF	Alex Surprenant	6	0	0	0	6	0
5	DF	André Duberry	1	0	0	0	1	0
6	MF	Shaun Saiko	7	1	0	1	7	2
8	DF	John Jonke	1	1	0	0	1	1
9	FW	Chris Lemire	5	1	0	0	5	1
10	MF	Kyle Yamada	1	0	0	0	1	0
11	FW	Paul Craig	1	0	0	0	1	0
14	DF	Paul Matthijs	1	0	0	0	1	0
16	MF	Eddy Sidra	0	0	1	0	1	0
18	DF	Paul Hamilton	7	1	0	0	7	1
20	MF	Chris Kooy	3	0	0	0	3	0
21	MF	Dominic Oppong	2	0	0	0	2	0
22	FW	Dan Antoniuk	2	0	0	0	2	0
24	DF	Antonio Rago	5	0	0	0	5	0
27	MF	Sam Lam	1	0	0	0	1	0
28	MF	Ilja van Leerdam	1	0	0	0	1	0
		TOTALS	44	6	1	1	45	7

== Recognition ==
=== NASL Player of the Week ===
Week	Player	Category
6	(United States) Lance Parker (GK)	Defensive
7	(Canada) Kyle Porter (FW)	Offensive
11	(Canada) Shaun Saiko (MF)	Offensive
20	(Canada) Michael Cox (FW)	Offensive
20	(Canada) Paul Hamilton (DF)	Defensive
23	(Canada) John Jonke (DF)	Defensive
