= 2011 Canadian Championship =

2011 professional soccer tournament

2011 Nutrilite Canadian Championship (in English) Championnat Canadien Nutrilite 2011 (in French)

Tournament details
- Country: Canada
- Date: April 27 – July 2
- Teams: 4 (from 2 leagues)

Final positions
- Champions: Toronto FC (3rd title)
- Runners-up: Vancouver Whitecaps FC

Tournament statistics
- Matches played: 6
- Goals scored: 12 (2 per match)
- Attendance: 82,463 (13,744 per match)
- Top goal scorer: Maicon Santos (3 goals)

Awards
- George Gross Memorial Trophy: Joao Plata

The 2011 Canadian Championship (officially the Nutrilite Canadian Championship) was a soccer tournament hosted and organized by the Canadian Soccer Association that took place in the cities of Edmonton, Montreal, Toronto and Vancouver in 2011. As in previous tournaments, participating teams included the Montreal Impact, Toronto FC and Vancouver Whitecaps FC, the latter participating for the first time since succeeding the previous iteration of the team. FC Edmonton also participated in this year's competition for the first time. Toronto FC won the tournament, claiming the Voyageurs Cup and Canada's entry into the preliminary round of the 2011–12 CONCACAF Champions League. The tournament has been held annually since 2008.

The format of the 2011 tournament was different from previous editions. In 2011, with four teams involved, the tournament was changed to be a home-and-away semi-final round and a similar final round between the winners. Toronto, as reigning champions, were assigned the top seed and were matched with Edmonton, who were assigned the fourth seed as newcomers to the tournament. The two remaining teams, Montreal and Vancouver, faced off in the other semi-final.

== Bracket ==
Seeding

  - 1. Toronto FC, MLS team, defending champions
  - 2. Vancouver Whitecaps FC, MLS team, tournament newcomers (successor to previous iteration)
  - 3. Montreal Impact, NASL team
  - 4. FC Edmonton, NASL team, tournament newcomers

Semi-finals
NASL	Montreal Impact	0	1	1
MLS	Vancouver Whitecaps FC	1	1	2
NASL	FC Edmonton	0	0	0
MLS	Toronto FC	3	1	4

Final
MLS	Vancouver Whitecaps FC	1	1	2
MLS	Toronto FC	1	2	3

== Matches ==
=== Semi-finals ===
April 27
8:00 pm EDT

Montreal Impact	0–1	Vancouver Whitecaps FC
	Report	Dunfield 67'

Saputo Stadium, Montreal, Quebec
Attendance: 8,412
Referee: Carol Anne Chénard

Team details

Montreal Impact	Vancouver Whitecaps FC

GK	1	(Puerto Rico) Bill Gaudette
DF	5	(Canada) Nevio Pizzolitto (c)
DF	21	(France) Philippe Billy
DF	77	(Georgia (country)) Zourab Tsiskaridze
DF	99	(France) Kevin Hatchi	(yellow card) 62'
MF	7	(United States) David Testo
MF	8	(United States) Luke Kreamalmeyer		(substituted off) 75'
MF	11	(Argentina) Leonardo Di Lorenzo		(substituted off) 68'
MF	12	(United States) Amir Lowery		(substituted off) 75'
FW	10	(Canada) Ali Gerba
FW	17	(France) Anthony Le Gall
Substitutes
FW	28	(France) Idriss Ech-Chergui		(substituted on) 68'
MF	23	(Canada) António Ribeiro		(substituted on) 75'
MF	30	(Canada) Pierre-Rudolph Mayard		(substituted on) 75'
Manager
(Canada) Marc Dos Santos

GK	18	(United States) Jay Nolly
DF	2	(New Zealand) Michael Boxall
DF	4	(Switzerland) Alain Rochat
DF	19	(United States) Blake Wagner
DF	25	(United States) Jonathan Leathers
DF	50	(France) Mouloud Akloul
MF	7	(Canada) Terry Dunfield (c)
MF	20	(Switzerland) Davide Chiumiento	(substituted off) 78'
MF	31	(Canada) Russell Teibert
FW	29	(France) Eric Hassli
FW	37	(Brazil) Camilo Sanvezzo	(substituted off) 68'
Substitutes
MF	16	(Tanzania) Nizar Khalfan	(substituted on) 68'
MF	22	(United States) Shea Salinas	(substituted on) 78'
Manager
(Iceland) Teitur Thordarson

Assistant referees
Daniel Belleau
Philippe Brière
Fourth official
John Oliva

May 4
8:00 pm PDT

Vancouver Whitecaps FC	1–1 (a.e.t.)	Montreal Impact
Akloul 113'	Report	Gerba 83' (pen.)

Empire Field, Vancouver, British Columbia
Attendance: 16,611
Referee: David Gantar

Team details

Vancouver Whitecaps FC	Montreal Impact

GK	18	(United States) Jay Nolly
DF	4	(Switzerland) Alain Rochat
DF	14	(United States) Greg Janicki
DF	25	(United States) Jonathan Leathers
DF	50	(France) Mouloud Akloul
MF	7	(Canada) Terry Dunfield (c)
MF	20	(Switzerland) Davide Chiumiento
MF	28	(Ghana) Gershon Koffie
MF	31	(Canada) Russell Teibert	(substituted off) 91'
FW	17	(United States) Omar Salgado	(substituted off) 69'
FW	29	(France) Eric Hassli	(substituted off) 46'
Substitutes
FW	37	(Brazil) Camilo Sanvezzo	(substituted on) 46'
MF	22	(United States) Shea Salinas	(substituted on) 69'
MF	16	(Tanzania) Nizar Khalfan	(substituted on) 91'
Manager
(Iceland) Teitur Thordarson

GK	1	(Puerto Rico) Bill Gaudette
DF	5	(Canada) Nevio Pizzolitto (c)
DF	21	(France) Philippe Billy
DF	77	(Georgia (country)) Zourab Tsiskaridze	(yellow card) 59'
DF	99	(France) Kevin Hatchi	(yellow card) 26'
MF	7	(United States) David Testo		(substituted off) 75'
MF	8	(United States) Luke Kreamalmeyer		(substituted off) 80'
MF	11	(Argentina) Leonardo Di Lorenzo		(substituted off) 75'
MF	12	(United States) Amir Lowery	(yellow card) 30'
FW	10	(Canada) Ali Gerba	(yellow card) 100'
FW	17	(France) Anthony Le Gall
Substitutes
MF	23	(Canada) António Ribeiro		(substituted on) 75'
MF	30	(Canada) Pierre-Rudolph Mayard		(substituted on) 75'
FW	28	(France) Idriss Ech-Chergui		(substituted on) 80'
Manager
(Canada) Marc Dos Santos

Assistant referees
Joe Fletcher
Marco Arruda
Fourth official
Alain Ruch

Vancouver Whitecaps FC won 2–1 on aggregate.

April 27
6:00 pm MDT

FC Edmonton	0–3	Toronto FC
	Report	Maicon Santos 35', 61'; Gordon 47'

Commonwealth Stadium, Edmonton, Alberta
Attendance: 5,781
Referee: Paul Ward

Team details

FC Edmonton	Toronto FC

GK	1	(Netherlands) Rein Baart
DF	4	(Canada) Alex Surprenant
DF	18	(Canada) Paul Hamilton
DF	24	(Canada) Antonio Rago		(substituted off) 75'
MF	6	(Canada) Shaun Saiko	(red card) 23'
MF	9	(Canada) Chris Lemire		(substituted off) 64'
MF	13	(Trinidad and Tobago) Conrad Smith
MF	20	(Canada) Chris Kooy (c)
MF	21	(Canada) Dominic Oppong
MF	29	(Canada) Kyle Porter
FW	10	(Canada) Kyle Yamada		(substituted off) 46'
Substitutes
MF	16	(Canada) Eddy Sidra	(yellow card) 90+1'	(substituted on) 46'
MF	26	(Canada) Sam Lam		(substituted on) 64'
DF	5	(Canada) André Duberry		(substituted on) 75'
Manager
(Netherlands) Harry Sinkgraven

GK	24	(Switzerland) Stefan Frei
DF	19	(Belgium) Mikael Yourassowsky
DF	20	(United States) Ty Harden
DF	25	(South Africa) Danleigh Borman
DF	27	(England) Richard Eckersley		(substituted off) 46'
DF	31	(Jamaica) Dicoy Williams
MF	16	(Canada) Oscar Cordon
MF	22	(Cameroon) Tony Tchani
MF	7	(Ecuador) Joao Plata		(substituted off) 64'
FW	21	(United States) Alan Gordon	(yellow card) 43'	(substituted off) 59'
FW	29	(Brazil) Maicon Santos (c)	(yellow card) 68'
Substitutes
DF	8	(United States) Dan Gargan		(substituted on) 46'
MF	23	(United States) Jacob Peterson		(substituted on) 59'
MF	18	(Netherlands) Nick Soolsma		(substituted on) 64'
Manager
(Netherlands) Aron Winter

Assistant referees
Darren Clark
Kevin Duliba
Fourth official
Drew Fischer

May 4
8:00 pm EDT

Toronto FC	1–0	FC Edmonton
Gordon 21'	Report

BMO Field, Toronto, Ontario
Attendance: 17,937
Referee: Mauricio Navarro

Team details

Toronto FC	FC Edmonton

GK	24	(Switzerland) Stefan Frei (c)
DF	12	(Canada) Adrian Cann
DF	19	(Belgium) Mikael Yourassowsky	(yellow card) 60'
DF	20	(United States) Ty Harden
DF	25	(South Africa) Danleigh Borman
DF	27	(England) Richard Eckersley
MF	6	(Canada) Julian de Guzman		(substituted off) 72'
MF	7	(Ecuador) Joao Plata
MF	22	(Cameroon) Tony Tchani		(substituted off) 72'
MF	23	(United States) Jacob Peterson
FW	21	(United States) Alan Gordon		(substituted off) 65'
Substitutes
FW	29	(Brazil) Maicon Santos		(substituted on) 65'
MF	18	(Netherlands) Nick Soolsma		(substituted on) 72'
MF	26	(Canada) Matt Gold		(substituted on) 72'
Manager
(Netherlands) Aron Winter

GK	23	(United States) Lance Parker
DF	12	(Canada) Niko Saler
DF	18	(Canada) Paul Hamilton
DF	24	(Canada) Antonio Rago
MF	13	(Trinidad and Tobago) Conrad Smith	(substituted off) 62'
MF	20	(Canada) Chris Kooy (c)
MF	21	(Canada) Dominic Oppong	(substituted off) 73'
MF	26	(Canada) Sam Lam
MF	29	(Canada) Kyle Porter
FW	10	(Canada) Kyle Yamada
FW	22	(United States) Dan Antoniuk	(substituted off) 85'
Substitutes
FW	11	(Canada) Paul Craig	(substituted on) 62'
MF	17	(Zambia) Mutanda Kwesele	(substituted on) 73'
MF	15	(United States) Shawn Chin	(substituted on) 85'
Manager
(Netherlands) Harry Sinkgraven

Assistant referees
Héctor Vergara
Bedik Charchafian
Fourth official
Justin Tasev

Toronto FC won 4–0 on aggregate.

=== Final ===
May 18
8:00 pm PDT

Vancouver Whitecaps FC	1–1	Toronto FC
Hassli 64'	Report	Maicon Santos 73'

Empire Field, Vancouver, British Columbia
Attendance: 15,474
Referee: Silviu Petrescu

Team details

Vancouver Whitecaps FC	Toronto FC

GK	18	(United States) Jay Nolly
DF	4	(Switzerland) Alain Rochat
DF	6	(United States) Jay DeMerit (c)
DF	14	(United States) Greg Janicki
DF	25	(United States) Jonathan Leathers
MF	7	(Canada) Terry Dunfield	(yellow card) 77'
MF	20	(Switzerland) Davide Chiumiento
MF	22	(United States) Shea Salinas		(substituted off) 83'
MF	28	(Ghana) Gershon Koffie	(yellow card) 68'
FW	29	(France) Eric Hassli		(substituted off) 74'
FW	37	(Brazil) Camilo Sanvezzo		(substituted off) 78'
Substitutes
FW	17	(United States) Omar Salgado		(substituted on) 74'
MF	16	(Tanzania) Nizar Khalfan		(substituted on) 78'
MF	31	(Canada) Russell Teibert		(substituted on) 83'
Manager
(Iceland) Teitur Thordarson

GK	24	(Switzerland) Stefan Frei
DF	8	(United States) Dan Gargan
DF	12	(Canada) Adrian Cann
DF	27	(England) Richard Eckersley
DF	31	(Jamaica) Dicoy Williams	(yellow card) 52'
MF	6	(Canada) Julian de Guzman
MF	18	(Netherlands) Nick Soolsma
MF	22	(Cameroon) Tony Tchani		(substituted off) 46'
MF	23	(United States) Jacob Peterson		(substituted off) 33'
FW	7	(Ecuador) Joao Plata		(substituted off) 76'
FW	29	(Brazil) Maicon Santos (c)
Substitutes
MF	26	(United States) Matt Gold		(substituted on) 33'
MF	16	(Canada) Oscar Cordon		(substituted on) 46'
FW	20	(United States) Ty Harden		(substituted on) 76'
Manager
(Netherlands) Aron Winter

Assistant referees
Darren Clark
Kevin Duliba
Fourth official
Drew Fischer

May 25
8:00 pm EDT

Toronto FC	Abandoned	Vancouver Whitecaps FC
	Report	Hassli 17'

BMO Field, Toronto, Ontario
Referee: David Gantar

Match abandoned in the 60th minute due to lightning and unplayable field conditions. Originally scheduled to be replayed on May 26, 11:00 am EDT, but was rescheduled as weather conditions prevented the match from being played. The second leg was eventually replayed on July 2, 12:30 pm EDT, in its entirety starting from 0–0 according to the rules of the tournament.

Replay July 2
12:30 pm EDT

Toronto FC	2–1	Vancouver Whitecaps FC
Plata 51' (pen.); Yourassowsky 61'	Report	Camilo 21'

BMO Field, Toronto, Ontario
Attendance: 18,212
Referee: David Gantar

Team details

Toronto FC	Vancouver Whitecaps FC

GK	24	(Switzerland) Stefan Frei
DF	25	(South Africa) Danleigh Borman
DF	27	(England) Richard Eckersley
DF	20	(United States) Ty Harden		(substituted off) 57'
DF	8	(United States) Dan Gargan
MF	11	(United States) Nathan Sturgis
MF	6	(Canada) Julian de Guzman		(substituted off) 87'
MF	19	(Belgium) Mikael Yourassowsky
MF	7	(Ecuador) Joao Plata
FW	29	(Brazil) Maicon Santos (c)		(substituted off) 33'
FW	18	(Netherlands) Nick Soolsma
Substitutes
FW	33	(Curaçao) Javier Martina	(yellow card) 56'	(substituted on) 33'
MF	32	(Cameroon) Tony Tchani		(substituted on) 57'
DF	4	(Canada) Doneil Henry		(substituted on) 87'
Manager
(Netherlands) Aron Winter

GK	1	(United States) Joe Cannon
DF	2	(New Zealand) Michael Boxall
DF	4	(Switzerland) Alain Rochat
DF	6	(United States) Jay DeMerit (c)		(substituted off) 62'
DF	7	(Canada) Terry Dunfield
MF	12	(United States) Jeb Brovsky		(substituted off) 72'
MF	22	(United States) Shea Salinas		(substituted off) 45'
MF	25	(United States) Jonathan Leathers
MF	28	(Ghana) Gershon Koffie
FW	29	(France) Eric Hassli	(yellow card) 50'
FW	37	(Brazil) Camilo
Substitutes
MF	31	(Canada) Russell Teibert	(yellow card) 72'	(substituted on) 45'
DF	19	(United States) Blake Wagner		(substituted on) 62'
MF	16	(Tanzania) Nizar Khalfan		(substituted on) 72'
Manager
(United States) Tom Soehn

Assistant referees
Joe Fletcher
Daniel Belleau
Fourth official
Geoff Gamble

Toronto FC won 3–2 on aggregate.

== Goalscorers ==
Rank	Player	Team	Goals
1	(Brazil) Maicon Santos	Toronto FC	3
2	(United States) Alan Gordon	Toronto FC	2
3	(France) Mouloud Akloul	Vancouver Whitecaps FC	1
3	(Brazil) Camilo	Vancouver Whitecaps FC	1
3	(Canada) Terry Dunfield	Vancouver Whitecaps FC	1
3	(France) Eric Hassli	Vancouver Whitecaps FC	1
3	(Canada) Ali Gerba	Montreal Impact	1
3	(Ecuador) Joao Plata	Toronto FC	1
3	(Belgium) Mikael Yourassowsky	Toronto FC	1
