= 2006 FIFA Beach Soccer World Cup squads =

The 2006 FIFA Beach Soccer World Cup was an international beach soccer tournament held in Rio de Janeiro, Brazil from 2 November until 12 November 2006. The 16 national teams involved in the tournament were required to register a squad of 12 players; only players in these squads were eligible to take part in the tournament.

== Group A ==
=== Brazil ===
No.	Pos.	Player	Date of birth (age)	Caps	Club
1	GK	Mão			
2	DF	Betinho			
3	DF	Bueno			
4	DF	Duda			
5	DF	Anderson			
6	FW	Bruno Malias			
7	FW	Sidney Souto			
8	DF	Junior Negão			
9	FW	André			
10	FW	Benjamin			
11	DF	Buru			
12	GK	Pierre			

=== Japan ===
No.	Pos.	Player	Date of birth (age)	Caps	Club
1	GK	Shingo Terukina			
2	DF	Noriaki Maruo			
3	DF	Naoyuki Kuroki			
4	DF	Shinji Makino			
5	DF	Masahito Toma			
6	DF	Tomoya Uehara			
7	FW	Takeshi Kawaharazuka			
8	FW	Kenyu Shiokawa			
9	FW	Yoshihito Sato			
10	FW	Takashi Arakaki			
11	FW	Katsuhiro Yoshii			
12	GK	Kazuo Ogawa			

=== United States ===
- Head coach: Roberto Ceciliano
- Assistant Coach: Chris Antonopoulos

No.	Pos.	Player	Date of birth (age)	Caps	Club
1	GK	Luis Montanez			
2	DF	Austin Roman			
3	DF	Brendon Taguinod			
4	FW	Yuri Morales			
5	DF	Benyam Astorga			
6	FW	Ronnie Silva			
7	FW	Noah Merl			
8	FW	Anthony Chimienti			
9	DF	Zak Ibsen			
10	FW	Francis Farberoff			
11	FW	Raphael Xexeo			
12	GK	Bayard Elfvin			

== Group B ==
=== France ===
No.	Pos.	Player	Date of birth (age)	Caps	Club
1	GK	Jean-Marie Aubry			
2	DF	Noel Sciortino			
3	DF	Thierry Ottavy			
4	DF	Jean-Marc Edouard			
5	DF	Didier Samoun			
6	DF	Sebastien Perez			
7	FW	Marc Libbra			
8	DF	Stephane François			
9	FW	Laurent Castro			
10	MF	Jairzinho			
11	MF	Jeremy Basquaise			
12	GK	Remy Ruiz			

=== Canada ===
Head coach: Ross Ongaro

No.	Pos.	Player	Date of birth (age)	Caps	Club
1	GK	Paul Dhaliwal			
2	DF	Damir Jesic			
3	DF	Kurt Bosch			
4	MF	Kyle Yamada			
5	MF	Ian Diaz			
6	FW	Eric Munoz			
7	DF	Angelo Sestito			
8	FW	Kyt Selaidopoulos			
9	MF	Chris Lemire			
10	FW	Sipho Sibiya			
11	MF	Jason Miniaci			
12	GK	Gregory Bonar			

== Group C ==
=== Portugal ===
No.	Pos.	Player	Date of birth (age)	Caps	Club
1	GK	Rodrigues			
2	DF	P. Jorge			
3	DF	Hernani			
4	DF	Alvaro			
5	FW	Ricardo Loja			
6	FW	Alan Cavalcanti			
7	FW	Madjer			
8	DF	Marinho			
9	FW	Gustavo			
10	FW	Belchior			
11	FW	Andrezinho			
12	GK	Bruno			

=== Uruguay ===
No.	Pos.	Player	Date of birth (age)	Caps	Club
1	GK	Diego Monserrat			
2	FP	Seba			
3	DF	Ricar			
4	DF	Coco			
5	MF	Pampero			
6	MF	Damian			
7	DF	German Parillo			
8	MF	Miguel			
9	FW	Oli			
10	FW	Fabian Canaveris			
11	MF	Matias			
12	GK	Leandro Ortiz			

=== Solomon Islands ===
No.	Pos.	Player	Date of birth (age)	Caps	Club
1	GK	Fred Hale			
2	GK	Paul Huia			
3	DF	Gideon Omokirio			
4	DF	Eddie Ngaitin			
5	MF	Richard Anisua			
6	DF	George Kwanae			
7	MF	Henry Koto			
8	MF	Sylvester Rogy			
9	FW	Joe Luwi			
10	FW	James Naka			
11	MF	Brian Feni			
12	FW	Vivian Wickham			

== Sources ==
- FIFA Squad Lists 2006
