= Adam Straith =

Canadian professional soccer player (born 1990)

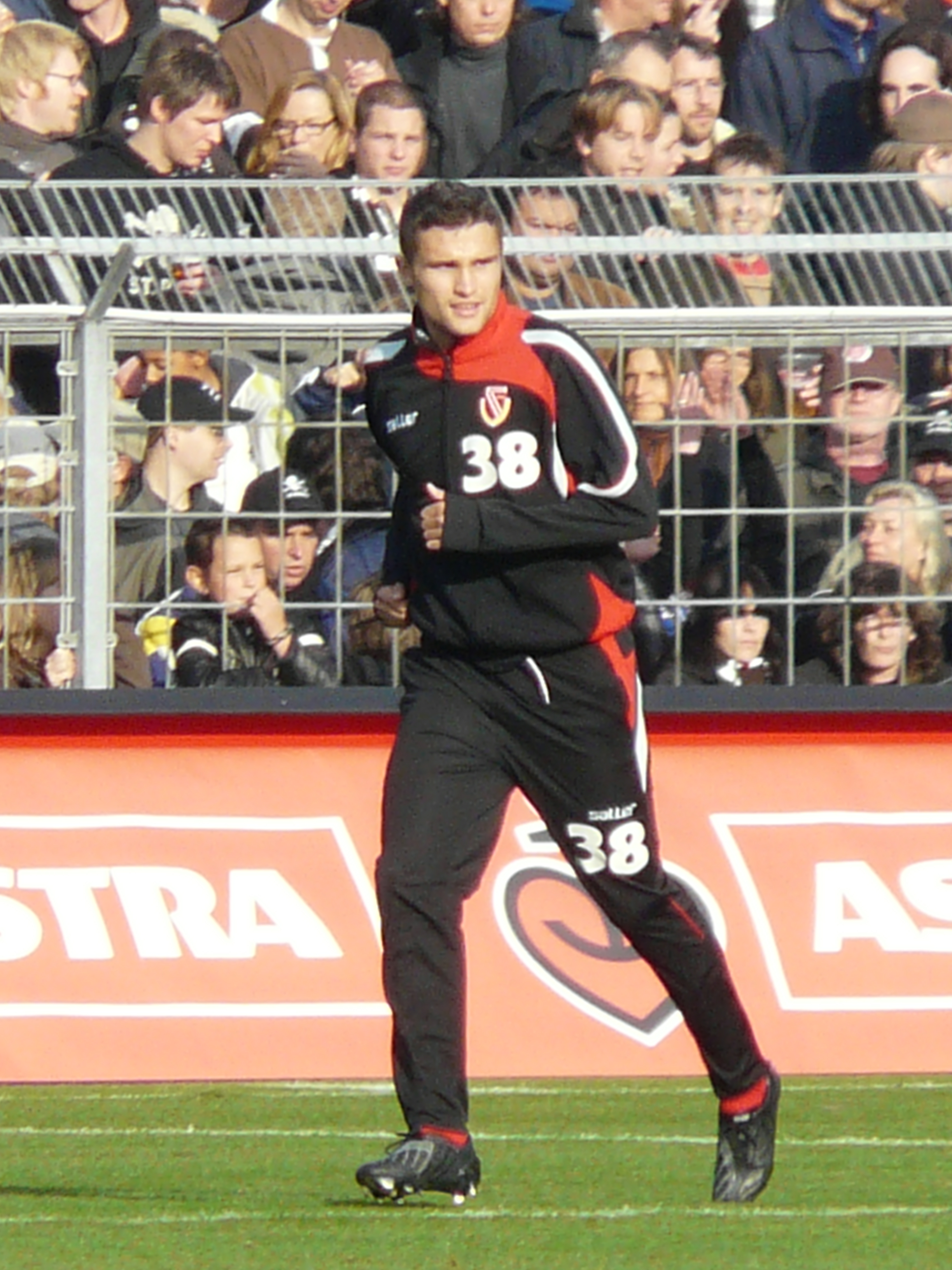
- Straith in 2009

Personal information
- Full name: John Adam Straith
- Date of birth: September 11, 1990 (age 36)
- Place of birth: Victoria, British Columbia, Canada
- Height: 6 ft 2 in (1.88 m)
- Positions: Defender; midfielder

Youth career
- 2000–2002: Lower Island Metro
- 2002–2005: Bays United
- 2005: Victoria United
- 2006–2007: Vancouver Whitecaps

Senior career*
Years	Team	Apps	(Gls)
2008–2009	Whitecaps Residency	12	(0)
2008–2009	→ Energie Cottbus II (loan)	14	(1)
2009–2011	Energie Cottbus II	7	(0)
2009–2013	Energie Cottbus	38	(1)
2012–2013	→ 1. FC Saarbrücken (loan)	36	(1)
2013–2014	SV Wehen Wiesbaden	8	(0)
2013–2014	SV Wehen Wiesbaden II	13	(1)
2015–2016	Fredrikstad	51	(6)
2017	FC Edmonton	11	(1)
2017–2019	Sportfreunde Lotte	66	(4)
2019–2020	Hansa Rostock	9	(0)
2020	Hansa Rostock II	1	(0)

International career
2006–2007	Canada U17	15	(2)
2008–2010	Canada U20	7	(1)
2010–2017	Canada	43	(0)
- * Club domestic league appearances and goals

John Adam Straith (born September 11, 1990) is a Canadian former professional soccer player.

== Early life ==
Born in Victoria, British Columbia, Straith attended Oak Bay High School in Victoria but left after grade 11 to attend Burnaby Central Secondary School as part of the Vancouver Whitecaps Residency program in the 2007–08 school year. He has an older brother, George, and a younger brother, Donald.

== Club career ==
=== Youth ===
Straith played for numerous clubs in Victoria including Bays United, Victoria United, and his Metro Team in the Lower Island Soccer Association, where he was captain. From July 12 to August 3, 2007, he went on trial with the U-19 Junior Bundesliga side of 1860 Munich, along with Antonio Rago. He left Canada in summer 2008, moving to German club Energie Cottbus on a season-long loan deal, after impressing the German club during a one-month trial. In the summer of 2009, Adam left Germany and returned to the Whitecaps but on August 25, 2009 Cottbus exercised its option to sign him for an undisclosed fee.

=== Professional ===
==== Germany ====
Straith made his senior debut for FC Energie Cottbus in the 2. Bundesliga against FC St. Pauli on October 25, 2009, and scored his first ever goal in Germany in his first game for the club. On December 16, 2009 Straith signed his first professional contract with FC Energie Cottbus tying him to the club until June 30, 2013. He joined 1. FC Saarbrücken on loan in January 2012. He later joined SV Wehen Wiesbaden in 2013.

==== Fredrikstad ====
After months without a club, Straith joined Norwegian side Fredrikstad in January 2015.

==== FC Edmonton ====
After two years in Norway, Straith joined both Inverness Caledonian Thistle and FC Ordabasy on trials in early 2017. Following his trial in Kazakhstan, Straith signed with North American Soccer League club FC Edmonton for the 2017 Spring Season. Upon the conclusion of the 2017 Spring Season, Straith and the club parted ways.

==== Sportfreunde Lotte ====
On August 18, 2017, Straith signed a one-year contract with German 3. Liga side Sportfreunde Lotte, marking his return to Germany after three years. After starting regularly in the 2017–18 season, Straith signed a one-year contract extension to keep him in Lotte until 2019. Straith would excel with Lotte in his second season, captaining the squad and leading them to the fifth best goals against in the league, however offensive struggles resulted in the club being relegated to the Regionalliga.

==== Hansa Rostock ====
After two years with Lotte, Straith would sign with fellow 3. Liga club Hansa Rostock on a two-year contract.

== International career ==
Straith was capped for the Canadian U-17 National team which failed to qualify for the U-17 World Cup in South Korea.

He scored his first goal for Canada in Jamaica during the Caribbean Cup, placing the ball in the left corner of the net.

On May 24, 2010, Straith made his senior team debut as an 81st-minute substitute in a 5–0 loss against Argentina at the Estadio Monumental. He played his second game on June 3, 2010 and played 90 minutes vs Venezuela, alongside his teammate Eddy Sidra. He was officially capped by Canada during its World Cup Qualifying match vs St. Lucia on October 7, 2011.

On June 27, 2013 Straith was confirmed as part of the 23-man squad for Colin Miller's Canada squad for the 2013 CONCACAF Gold Cup. He also represented Canada at the 2015 CONCACAF Gold Cup.

On January 22, 2017, following an injury to goalkeeper Sean Melvin, Straith played the final 35 minutes in net for Canada against Bermuda. Canada would win the game 4–2, with Straith making a few saves and keeping a clean sheet. Straith was named to the 2017 CONCACAF Gold Cup squad on June 27, 2017.

== Personal life ==
In June 2019 he married one time Canada national women's soccer team player Monica Lam Feist, who plays for SV Grün Weiß Rheine in Germany's Kreisliga A. The couple have one child and living outside Rostock's.

== Career statistics ==
=== Club ===
As of match played 1 July 2020

Appearances and goals by club, season and competition
Club	Season	League			Cup		Other		Total	
Club	Season	Division	Apps	Goals	Apps	Goals	Apps	Goals	Apps	Goals
Energie Cottbus II	2008–09	Regionalliga Nord	14	1	—		—		14	1
Energie Cottbus II	2011–12	Regionalliga Nord	3	0	—		—		3	0
Energie Cottbus	2009–10	2. Bundesliga	23	1	0	0	—		23	1
Energie Cottbus	2010–11	2. Bundesliga	7	0	1	0	—		8	0
Energie Cottbus	2011–12	2. Bundesliga	8	0	1	0	—		9	0
Energie Cottbus	Total		38	1	2	0	0	0	40	1
1. FC Saarbrücken	2011–12	3. Liga	14	0	0	0	—		14	0
1. FC Saarbrücken	2012–13	3. Liga	23	1	1	0	—		24	1
1. FC Saarbrücken	Total		37	1	1	0	0	0	38	1
Wehen Wiesbaden	2013–14	3. Liga	8	0	—		—		8	0
KuPS	2014	Veikkausliiga	0	0	0	0	1 (Note: Appearance in the Finnish League Cup)	0	1	0
Fredrikstad FK	2015	1. divisjon	21	4	0	0	—		21	4
Fredrikstad FK	2016	1. divisjon	30	2	1	0	—		31	2
Fredrikstad FK	Total		51	6	1	0	0	0	52	6
FC Edmonton	2017	NASL	11	1	1	0	—		12	1
Sportfreunde Lotte	2017–18	3. Liga	32	1	—		—		32	1
Sportfreunde Lotte	2018–19	3. Liga	34	3	—		—		34	3
Sportfreunde Lotte	Total		66	4	0	0	0	0	66	4
Hansa Rostock	2019–20	3. Liga	9	0	0	0	—		9	0
Career total			237	14	5	0	1	0	243	14
