= Alex Semenets =

Canadian soccer player (1990–2020)

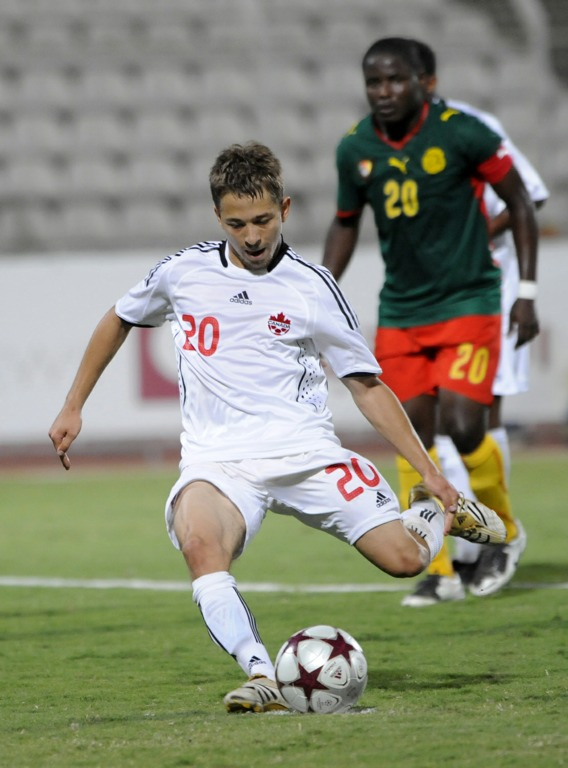
- Semenets with Canada U20 at the 2009 Jeux de la Francophonie

Personal information
- Full name: Oleksander Semenets
- Date of birth: March 10, 1990
- Place of birth: Kiev, Ukrainian SSR, Soviet Union
- Date of death: August 2020 (aged 30)
- Height: 1.73 m (5 ft 8 in)
- Positions: Midfielder; forward

Youth career
- 2000–2007: Oakville SC
- 2007–2012: Vancouver Whitecaps

College career
Years	Team	Apps	(Gls)
2014	CBU Capers		

Senior career*
Years	Team	Apps	(Gls)
2007–2010	Whitecaps Residency	28	(7)
2009–2010	Vancouver Whitecaps	3	(0)
2011–2012	FC Edmonton	15	(1)
2013	Toronto Lynx	2	(0)
Total		48	(8)

International career
2006–2007	Canada U17	15	(1)
2009	Canada U20	4	(3)
- * Club domestic league appearances and goals

Oleksander "Alex" Semenets (March 10, 1990 – late August 2020) was a Canadian professional soccer player who played as a midfielder.

== Early life ==
Semenets moved from his native Ukraine to Canada in 1998, settling in Mississauga, Ontario. He attended Iona Catholic High School and played club soccer for Oakville SC before joining the Vancouver Whitecaps residency program in 2007.

== Club career ==
Semenets played with the Vancouver Whitecaps Residency squad in the USL Premier Development League season in 2008 and 2009, helping his team to the PDL playoffs in his debut season, before being called up to the senior Vancouver Whitecaps side following the conclusion of the 2009 PDL season. He made his first-team debut on July 25, 2010, in a match against the NSC Minnesota Stars, coming on as a substitute in the 80th minute.

On March 5, 2011 Semenets signed with FC Edmonton, an expansion club in the second division North American Soccer League. The club re-signed Semenets for the 2012 season on October 12, 2011.

In 2014 he briefly appeared for Cape Breton University.

== International career ==
Semenets received his first national team call-up for the Canadian under-17 team in April 2006 for the Ballymena U-16 Tournament. He subsequently played for Canada at the 2007 CONCACAF U17 Tournament in Jamaica, making three appearances.

In September 2009, Semenets was named to the Canadian under-20 team for the 2009 Jeux de la Francophonie in Lebanon. In the first match of the tournament against Rwanda, Semenets came off the bench to score two goals in a 3–2 loss. In the second and final group stage match against Cameroon, he received his first start and scored the second goal in a 2–0 win which enabled Canada to advance from the group stage on goal difference.

Semenets started in the semi-final against Congo Republic and after the match went to penalties after finishing 2–2, Semenets scored Canada's lone penalty as they lost the shootout 2–1. He also appeared off the bench in the consolation match against Morocco, a 3–1 loss.

== Death ==
On September 4, 2020, Vancouver Whitecaps released a statement announcing Semenets' passing the previous week, accompanied by statements from former teammates and coaches, including Philippe Davies, Gagan Dosanjh, Randy Edwini-Bonsu, Ethan Gage, Navid Mashinchi, Kyle Porter, Antonio Rago, Adam Straith, Russell Teibert, Simon Thomas and Bob Lenarduzzi. His place and cause of death were not disclosed.
