= Justin Ammar =

Canadian professional soccer player

Personal information
- Full name: Justin Ammar
- Date of birth: March 25, 1988 (age 38)
- Place of birth: St. Albert, Alberta, Canada
- Height: 1.85 m (6 ft 1 in)
- Position: Goalkeeper

College career
Years	Team	Apps	(Gls)
2014-2015	NAIT	13	(0)

Senior career*
Years	Team	Apps	(Gls)
2009–2012	SV Heimstetten	35	(0)
2013-2014	FC Edmonton	5	(0)
2019-2020	Joondalup City FC	20	(0)
- * Club domestic league appearances and goals as of June 10, 2011

Justin Ammar (born March 25, 1988) is a Canadian former professional soccer player.

== Career ==
=== Europe ===
Ammar attended Paul Kane High School. After graduating, he joined the Canadian European Futbol Academy in an attempt to secure a professional playing contract in Europe. After attending trials, Ammar signed with German Fußball-Bayernliga team SV Heimstetten for 2009–2012 season. He made his professional debut on July 31, 2010, coming on as a substitute for starting keeper Patrick Lehner in a game against SpVgg Bayreuth. He went on to make 35 appearances for the club. Justin trained with the DFCA (Deutsch-Fußball-Canadian-Academy) and was named MVP. During his time there, he played against high quality teams, ranging from Germany U20, 1860 Munich, FC Bayern Munich II, Saudi Arabia U20, Vancouver Whitecaps and many more.

=== College career ===
Ammar was member of the 2014-2015 NAIT Ooks. The team ended up going undefeated in the season, winning the League championship, and going off to nationals in Montreal. They won nationals, going undefeated across the entire season.

=== North America ===
Ammar was called up by FC Edmonton of North American Soccer League on June 10, 2013, to provide goalkeeper cover for starter Lance Parker for their game against the Carolina RailHawks. Parker broke his arm in the 80th minute of the game, and Ammar came off the bench to make his debut for Edmonton. He kept a clean sheet in his 10 minutes in the game, although Edmonton lost the match 1–0.

=== Australia ===
Ammar flew overseas to Australia playing semi professional soccer for Joondalup City FC In the Western Australian State League finishing top 3 in the league.

=== Personal life ===
As of 2026, Ammar lives in Guelph, Ontario with his wife, Charmaine Collins, a real estate agent, and his two sons.

In 2022, Ammar launched his own goalkeeper academy called Shot Stopper Academy, located in Guelph, Ontario, Canada.
