= David Monsalve =

Canadian soccer player (born 1988)

Personal information
- Full name: David Andrés Monsalve
- Date of birth: December 21, 1988 (age 37)
- Place of birth: North York, Ontario, Canada
- Height: 1.88 m (6 ft 2 in)
- Position: Goalkeeper

Team information
- Current team: Toronto FC II (goalkeeper coach)

Youth career
- Toronto CS Azzurri
- North York Hearts-Azzurri

Senior career*
Years	Team	Apps	(Gls)
2007–2008	MLS Pool	–	(–)
2007	→ Toronto FC (loan)	1	(0)
2007	→ FC Dallas (loan)	0	(0)
2008	North York Astros	6	(0)
2009–2011	Inter Turku	14	(0)
2009–2010	→ Sinimustat (dual registration)	12	(0)
2011–2012	FC Edmonton	2	(0)
2013–2014	AC Oulu	47	(0)
2015	América de Cali	4	(0)
2016	Suchitepéquez	25	(0)
2016–2017	Inter Turku	1	(0)
2017	Husqvarna FF	11	(0)
2017	Vaughan Azzurri	1	(0)
2018–2019	Ottawa Fury	4	(0)
2020	Forge FC	0	(0)
2020–2021	Xelajú	25	(0)

International career
2004	Canada U17	2	(0)
2005–2007	Canada U18	7	(0)
2005–2007	Canada U20	10	(0)
2008	Canada U23	1	(0)
2010	Canada	1	(0)

Managerial career
- 2021: Ontario Tech Ridgebacks (goalkeepers/assistant)
- 2022–: Toronto FC II (goalkeepers)
- * Club domestic league appearances and goals as of 27 April 2021

David Andrés Monsalve (born December 21, 1988) is a Canadian former professional soccer player who played as a goalkeeper and who currently serves as goalkeeper coach for Toronto FC II.

== Club career ==
=== Toronto FC ===
He was brought in during the 2007 season by Toronto FC as an injury relief player, as he was signed as an MLS Pool goalkeeper. Monsalve made his MLS and professional debut on July 29 against the Chicago Fire. He is one of the youngest goalkeepers to play a game in the MLS. He was also the goalkeeper in a friendly against Aston Villa a couple of days earlier. Although both games were lost by TFC he impressed both his manager and the fans with his abilities. His MLS rights are held by Toronto FC. On July 27 he was called up for the game against New York Red Bulls. He also joined FC Dallas on an emergency basis, but did not play.

After his tenure with Toronto he played in the Canadian Soccer League with the North York Astros.

=== Inter Turku ===
He was on trial in Norway for Lillestrøm SK and later signed with FC Inter Turku for the next three seasons.

Monsalve made his Veikkausliiga and FC Inter Turku debut on July 1 against Tampere United. He replaced the first choice goalkeeper Patrick Bantamoi who had been sent off previous game against HJK on 85 minutes and had been banned. Monsalve was also sent off. He was replaced by FC Inter Turku's third goalkeeper young Eemeli Reponen. Third game in row with different goalkeeper at start XI.

On October 31, 2009, Monsalve got to lift the Finnish Cup trophy for the first time in his club's (FC Inter Turku) history. Monsalve played the whole match in goal when his team beat Tampere United 1–2.

On January 28, 2011 it was verified that Monsalve was on trial with his former team Toronto FC, and was making the pre-season trip to Turkey. He was one of three Canadian Internationals that were on trial for the MLS side, Eddy Sidra and midfielder Gianluca Zavarise.

=== FC Edmonton ===
On August 3, 2011 Monslave signed with FC Edmonton in the North American Soccer League. The club re-signed Monsalve for the 2012 season on October 12, 2011.

=== AC Oulu ===
Monsalve joined AC Oulu in early 2013 and spent two season with the club in the Ykkönen.

=== América de Cali ===
Monsalve returned to North America after the 2014 Ykkönen season to try and sign a contract closer to home. He trialed with the Jacksonville Armada ahead of their inaugural season in the NASL. Monsalve would reveal after his trial ended that he was asked by Jacksonville if he could quit playing soccer for a year and wait to receive a U.S. green card so he could sign with the team and not take up an international spot.

Monsalve refused and he went to Colombia and signed for América de Cali in the Categoría Primera B in early January 2015. He made his debut in a promotion play-off tournament match against Deportivo Pereira on January 21, which ended in a 1–1 draw. Monsalve made his league debut against Universitario Popayán, coming in as a substitute after an injury to starting goalkeeper John Meneses.

=== Suchitepéquez ===
Monsalve signed with Suchitepéquez in January 2016, and made his club debut later in the same month, becoming the first Canadian goalkeeper to play professionally in Guatemala

=== Vaughan Azzurri ===
After stints in Finland and Sweden, Monsalve returned to Canada and joined League1 Ontario side Vaughan Azzurri in August 2017, making one appearance.

=== Ottawa Fury ===
After a two-week trial, Monsalve signed with USL side Ottawa Fury FC on 12 February 2018. Monsalve re-signed with the Ottawa Fury FC in November, 2018. After two seasons with the Fury, the club would cease operations for the 2020 season, making Monsalve a free agent.

=== Forge FC ===
On March 2, 2020, Monsalve signed with Canadian Premier League side Forge FC.

=== Xelajú ===
In July 2020 Monsalve returned to Guatemala and joined Liga Nacional club Xelajú.

== International career ==
=== Youth ===
During July 2007 David was a member of the Canada's Under-20 national team that competed in the 2007 U-20 World Cup in Canada.

During March 2008 he was on the roster of the Canadian U-23 men's national soccer team which had placed 3rd in the 2008 CONCACAF Men's Olympic Qualification Tournament.

=== Senior ===
Monsalve received his first international cap in a friendly match versus Jamaica on January 31, 2010.

More than five years after his debut and only cap, Monsalve was set to be called up for friendlies against Guatemala and Puerto Rico in March 2015, but declined the call due to a goalkeeper injury crisis at his club, América de Cali.

== Coaching career ==
After his playing career, he became the assistant and goalkeeper coach for Ontario Tech University's men's and women's teams as well as Technical Director of North York F.C. In 2021, he was announced as an assistant coach for the women's team of the Simcoe County Rovers in League1 Ontario for the 2022 season, however, he later joined Toronto FC II as their goalkeepers coach instead.

== Personal life ==
Monsalve's parents were both born in Colombia and he can speak both English and Spanish.

== Career statistics ==
As of April 27, 2021

Club	League	Season	League		Playoffs		Cup		Continental		Total	
Club	League	Season	Apps	Goals	Apps	Goals	Apps	Goals	Apps	Goals	Apps	Goals
Toronto FC	MLS	2007	1	0	—		0	0	—		1	0
FC Inter Turku	Veikkausliiga	2009	7	0	—		2	0	—		9	0
FC Inter Turku	Veikkausliiga	2010	7	0	—		0	0	1	0	8	0
FC Inter Turku	Total		14	0	0	0	2	0	1	0	17	0
FC Edmonton	NASL	2011	1	0	—		0	0	—		1	0
FC Edmonton	NASL	2012	1	0	—		2	0	—		3	0
FC Edmonton	Total		2	0	0	0	2	0	0	0	4	0
AC Oulu	Ykkönen	2013	21	0	—		0	0	—		21	0
AC Oulu	Ykkönen	2014	26	0	—		0	0	—		26	0
AC Oulu	Total		47	0	0	0	0	0	0	0	47	0
América de Cali	Categoría Primera B	2015	4	0	1	0	2	0	—		7	0
Suchitepéquez	Liga Nacional	2015-16	25	0	—		0	0	0	0	25	0
FC Inter Turku	Veikkausliiga	2016	1	0	—		2	0	—		3	0
Husqvarna FF	Division 1 Södra	2017	11	0	—		0	0	—		11	0
Vaughan Azzurri	League1 Ontario	2017	1	0	—		—		—		1	0
Ottawa Fury	USL	2018	1	0	—		0	0	—		1	0
Ottawa Fury	USL	2019	3	0	—		0	0	—		3	0
Ottawa Fury	Total		4	0	0	0	0	0	0	0	4	0
Forge FC	CPL	2020	0	0	0	0	0	0	0	0	0	0
Xelajú	Liga Nacional	2020-21	25	0	0	0	0	0	0	0	25	0
Career total			135	0	1	0	8	0	1	0	145	0

== Honours ==
Inter Turku

- Finnish Cup: 2009
