= Mutanda Kwesele =

Zambian footballer (born 1986)

Personal information
- Full name: Mutanda Kwesele
- Date of birth: March 14, 1986 (age 40)
- Place of birth: Mufulira, Zambia
- Height: 5 ft 7 in (1.70 m)
- Position: Midfielder

College career
Years	Team	Apps	(Gls)
2005	Santa Clara Broncos	3	(1)
2006–2008	Seattle Redhawks	39	(1)

Senior career*
Years	Team	Apps	(Gls)
2007	Tacoma Tide	6	(1)
2009	Portland Timbers U23s	10	(1)
2011	FC Edmonton	1	(0)
- * Club domestic league appearances and goals as of May 11, 2011

Mutanda Kwesele (born March 14, 1986, in Mufulira) is a Zambian footballer.

== Career ==
=== Youth and college ===
Kwesele moved from his native Zambia to the United States with his family as a child, settling in Seattle, Washington. He attended Seattle Preparatory School, where he was a two-time All-Metro and All-District selection, and began his college soccer at Santa Clara University. He transferred to Seattle University prior to his sophomore season in 2006, and played three seasons with the Redhawks, helping the team reach the NCAA tournament in back-to-back seasons in 2006 and 2007. He played in 42 games during his college career, recording two goals and five assists.

During his college years Kwesele also played with the Tacoma Tide in the USL Premier Development League in 2007, playing in 10 games and scoring 1 goal.

=== Professional ===
Undrafted out of college, Kwesele was unable to secure a professional contract, and signed instead to play with the Portland Timbers U23s in the USL Premier Development League in 2009.

He signed his first professional contract in 2011 when he signed with FC Edmonton of the North American Soccer League.

He made his debut for Edmonton on May 4, 2011, in a 1–0 loss to Toronto FC in the 2011 Nutrilite Canadian Championship. The club released Kwesele on October 12, 2011, after the conclusion of the 2011 season.

=== Coaching ===
Mutanda has coached for several Seattle-area clubs, organizations and schools. He is currently a coach with Emerald City Football Club, and has coached for Rainier Beach High School. Mutanda is also founder of The Rising Point, a non-profit organization designed to bring quality soccer programs to underserved communities.
