= Adrian LeRoy =

Canadian former soccer player (born 1987)

Personal information
- Full name: Adrian LeRoy
- Date of birth: May 6, 1987 (age 39)
- Place of birth: Montreal, Quebec, Canada
- Height: 1.83 m (6 ft 0 in)
- Position: Defender

College career
Years	Team	Apps	(Gls)
2005	Carleton Ravens		
2006	Maine Black Bears		
2007–2009	Old Dominion Monarchs		

Senior career*
Years	Team	Apps	(Gls)
2007	Ottawa Fury	14	(1)
2008	Hampton Roads Piranhas	13	(0)
2009–2010	Ottawa Fury	23	(2)
2011	FC Edmonton	1	(0)
2012	Harrisburg City Islanders	10	(0)
2013	FC Edmonton	6	(0)
Total		67	(3)
- * Club domestic league appearances and goals as of April 20, 2016

Adrian LeRoy (born May 6, 1987) is a Canadian former soccer player.

== Career ==
=== College and amateur ===
LeRoy began his college career at Carleton University in 2005, leading the team to an Ontario University Championship. After one season there, he moved to the University of Maine where he played 15 games in 2006 and was named 2006 University of Maine Scholar Athlete Rising Star. In 2007, LeRoy redshirted his sophomore year after transferring to Old Dominion University. In 2008, he played in 10 games and scored one goal against George Mason. In 09', he finished the year with two assists.

During his college years LeRoy also played for the Hampton Roads Piranhas and the Ottawa Fury in the USL Premier Development League.

=== Professional ===
On April 19, 2011, LeRoy signed with NASL side FC Edmonton.

LeRoy join Harrisburg City Islanders in 2012 before returning to Edmonton for the 2013 season. In 2014, he returned to Ottawa and went on trial with his newly-professional former club, the Ottawa Fury FC, but was not signed.

== Post-retirement ==
After retiring from soccer LeRoy began working as a wealth advisor, as he had earned his honours degree in economics from Old Dominion University.
