= Maicon Santos =

Brazilian footballer (born 1984)

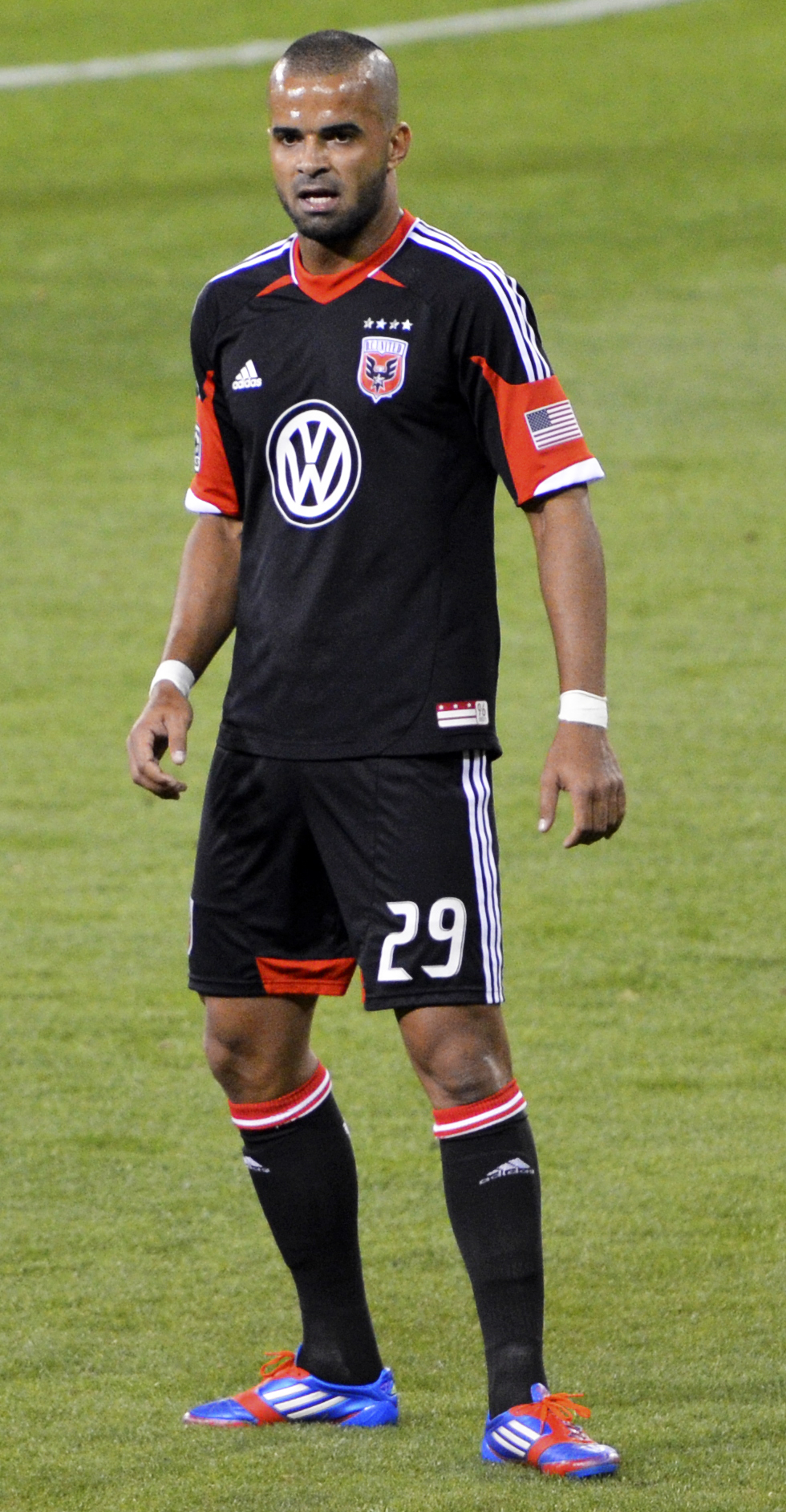
- Maicon Santos playing for D.C. United in 2012

Personal information
- Full name: Maicon dos Santos Corrêa
- Date of birth: 18 April 1984 (age 42)
- Place of birth: Paracambi, Brazil
- Height: 6 ft 1 in (1.85 m)
- Position: Forward

Senior career*
Years	Team	Apps	(Gls)
2004–2006	Madureira		
2006	→ Remo (loan)	4	(3)
2006–2008	Étoile du Sahel		
2007	→ Al-Nasr Benghazi (loan)		
2008	Ironi Kiryat Shomna	1	(0)
2008	Bnei Sakhnin	10	(0)
2008–2010	Bonsucesso		
2009–2010	→ Chivas USA (loan)	19	(2)
2010–2011	Toronto FC	32	(10)
2011	FC Dallas	11	(2)
2012	D.C. United	26	(7)
2013	Chicago Fire	14	(2)
2014	Puebla	9	(1)
2015	Tampa Bay Rowdies	17	(7)
2016	Fort Lauderdale Strikers	23	(7)
Total		166	(41)
- * Club domestic league appearances and goals as of 5 August 2019

Maicon dos Santos Corrêa (born 18 April 1984) is a retired Brazilian footballer who last played as a forward for Fort Lauderdale Strikers in the North American Soccer League.

== Career ==
Maicon started his career at Madureira, where he was awarded a contract until the end of 2005. He signed a contract extension until April 2008 in early 2006, but left for Étoile du Sahel on 9 August 2006. During his career in North Africa he also played on loan to Al-Nasr (Benghazi).

In 2008, he played for Israeli clubs Hapoel Ironi Kiryat Shomna and Bnei Sakhnin. While with Hapoel Ironi Kiryat Shomna Maicon appeared in 2 UEFA Cup matches and 3 Toto Cup matches in which he scored 1 goal. After a brief stay with Hapoel he moved to Bnei Sakhnin and appeared in 10 league matches, he also appeared in 2 Toto Cup matches for Bnei Sakhnin in which he scored 3 goals.

He then returned to Brazil with Bonsucesso. Following that, he signed a loan deal with the Major League Soccer club Chivas USA in 2009. While with Chivas Maicon appeared in 19 league matches and scored 2 goals, he also appeared in 2 MLS playoffs matches scoring 1 goal.

On 9 July 2010 it was announced that Maicon had signed with Major League Soccer club Toronto FC. He made his debut for Toronto as a sub following halftime on 10 July 2010 vs. Colorado Rapids. He scored his first goal in a friendly against Bolton Wanderers at BMO Field on 21 July 2010. Three days later on 24 July 2010 Maicon scored his first league goal for Toronto in a 1–1 home draw to FC Dallas. Maicon also helped the club by scoring in a CONCACAF Champions League game vs. Real Salt Lake on 16 September 2010 following a pass from teammate O'Brian White.

Maicon scored his first goal of the 2011 season on 19 March 2011 in a 4–2 loss to the expansion Vancouver Whitecaps FC in the first game of the year. Following the departure of Toronto captain Dwayne De Rosario on 1 April Maicon was given the captain's arm band the following day against his former team Chivas USA. After the 1–1 home draw against Chivas Coach Aron Winter announced that Maicon would become the permanent captain of The Reds, thus becoming the first non-Canadian to be given the honour on a full-time basis.

On 2 August 2011, Toronto FC traded Maicon and an international roster spot to FC Dallas for Eric Avila. On 13 August 2011, Maicon scored his first goal on his debut in a match against the Philadelphia Union. At season's end, the club declined his 2012 contract option and he entered the 2011 MLS Re-Entry Draft. Santos was not selected in the draft and became a free agent.

D.C. United signed Santos from free agency on 18 January 2012 after participating in the club's pre-season camp.

After D.C. declined his 2013 contract option, Santos was selected by Chicago Fire in the first round of Stage One of the 2012 MLS Re-Entry Draft. He spent the 2013 MLS season with Chicago before the Fire declined his 2014 contract option. Santos entered the 2013 MLS Re-Entry Draft but was not selected.

Santos signed with Mexican club Puebla in February 2014.

After one season in Mexico, Santos signed with Tampa Bay Rowdies of the North American Soccer League in February 2015.

In December 2015, Santos signed with Fort Lauderdale Strikers of NASl. Santos became a free agent when the Strikers ceased operations after the 2016 season.

Santos retired after playing for Fort Lauderdale.

== Personal life ==
On 28 July 2012 Santos received his U.S. green card making him a domestic player for MLS roster purposes.

== Honours ==
=== Club ===
Étoile du Sahel

- Tunisian Ligue Professionnelle 1: 2006–07
- CAF Confederation Cup: 2006

Toronto FC

- Canadian Championship (1): 2011

=== Individual ===
- Canadian Championship Golden Boot: 2011

Sporting positions
Preceded by Dwayne De Rosario	Toronto captain 2011	Succeeded by Torsten Frings
