= John Meneses =

Colombian footballer (born 1984)

Personal information
- Full name: John Visman Meneses Martínez
- Date of birth: 5 March 1984 (age 42)
- Place of birth: Zarzal, Colombia
- Height: 1.97 m (6 ft 6 in)
- Position: Goalkeeper

Senior career*
Years	Team	Apps	(Gls)
2006–2013	Deportivo Cali		
2009–2010	→ Córdoba (loan)		
2011–2012	→ Atlético de la Sabana (loan)		
2012–2013	→ Dépor (loan)	33	(0)
2014–2018	América de Cali	53	(0)
2017	→ Atlético (loan)	2	(0)
2017	→ Unión Magdalena (loan)	5	(0)
- * Club domestic league appearances and goals as of 18 February 2019

John Visman Meneses (born 5 March 1984) is a Colombian footballer who most recently played for América de Cali in the Categoría Primera B as a goalkeeper.
