= Niko Saler =

Canadian soccer player (born 1992)

Personal information
- Full name: Niko Saler
- Date of birth: April 15, 1992 (age 34)
- Place of birth: Lethbridge, Alberta, Canada
- Height: 5 ft 10 in (1.78 m)
- Position: Defender

Team information
- Current team: Alberta Golden Bears
- Number: 12

Youth career
- 2012–: Alberta Golden Bears

Senior career*
Years	Team	Apps	(Gls)
2011	FC Edmonton	6	(0)
- * Club domestic league appearances and goals as of March 21, 2012

Niko Saler (born April 15, 1992) is a Canadian soccer player.

== Career ==
=== Youth and amateur ===
Saler, who did not play traditional college soccer, first achieved success at the U-15 level when he won the Rocky Mountain Cup with Team Alberta in 2007. He subsequently won a bronze medal at the BMO Canadian U-16 National Championships, and a Silver at the U-18 Canada Games in 2009, as well as Provincial and National Championships at the club level with Calgary Foothills Crew. In September 2012 left FC Edmonton and joined the University of Alberta. In November 2012 was named as the Canadian Interuniversity Sport Rookie of the Year by the Alberta Golden Bears.

=== Professional ===
Saler turned professional in 2010 when he signed with North American Soccer League side FC Edmonton. He played for Edmonton during its 2010 exhibition season, and continued on with the team in its first season in the NASL in 2011. He made his professional debut on May 4, 2011 in a 2011 Canadian Championship game against Toronto FC, and made his first league appearance for Edmonton on May 31 in a 4-0 win over FC Tampa Bay. The club re-signed Saler for the 2012 season on October 12, 2011.

=== International ===
Saler was called up to his first Canadian national youth team camp in 2011, in preparation for an Olympic qualifier in Guatemala.
