= John Jonke =

Canadian soccer player (born 1987)

Personal information
- Full name: John Phillip Jonke
- Date of birth: January 20, 1987 (age 39)
- Place of birth: Scarborough, Ontario, Canada
- Height: 6 ft 2 in (1.88 m)
- Position: Defender

Youth career
- 2004–2005: Toronto Lynx
- 2006–2008: Louisville Cardinals

Senior career*
Years	Team	Apps	(Gls)
2007–2008	Toronto Lynx	21	(0)
2009–2010	AC Oulu	10	(1)
2010	Crystal Palace Baltimore	1	(0)
2010	Portugal FC	14	(1)
2011	FC Edmonton	19	(1)
2014	Vaughan Azzurri	0	(0)

International career^{‡}
2005	Canada U-20	3	(0)
- * Club domestic league appearances and goals as of October 14, 2011 ‡ National team caps and goals as of January 9, 2010

John Jonke (born January 20, 1987, in Scarborough, Ontario) is a Canadian soccer player.

== Career ==
=== College and amateur ===
Jonke began playing soccer at the youth level during his secondary school years with St. Mary's Catholic Secondary School. In his senior year at St. Mary's Jonke was appointed team captain, and helped guide his team to the regional championship. When the season reached closure Jonke was awarded Player of the Year. In 2004 Jonke joined the Toronto Lynx youth academy, where he was appointed team captain and won the Heartland Division Championship. He also helped the U-19 Lynx squad reach the finals of the Dallas Cup where the Lynx were defeated 2–1 by IMG Soccer Academy. Soon after, Jonke was enrolled into the University of Louisville on a soccer scholarship. In his rookie season with the Cardinals he appeared in 22 matches and help strengthen the defence by recording eight shutouts. In his freshman season he recorded his first goal against Syracuse, and was able to establish himself as a starter.

In 2007 the Toronto Lynx announced the signing of Jonke for the 2007 PDL season. He made his Lynx debut on May 12, 2007, against the West Michigan Edge. The Lynx finished the season with a 6-6-4 record, which placed the team in fourth place in the Great Lakes Division, and only missed a playoff berth by six points. In 2008 Jonke helped the Lynx reach the playoffs for the first time since 2000, but unfortunately for the Lynx the Cleveland Internationals scored a late winner to take the game 2–1, sending the Lynx home early.

=== Professional ===
The following year Jonke turned professional when he signed with AC Oulu in Finland. He made his debut for AC Oulu on June 28, 2009, by scoring the winning goal in a 1–0 victory over FC KooTeePee.

After a year in Finland, Jonke returned to North America in early 2010 when he signed with Crystal Palace Baltimore of the USSF Division 2 Professional League. For the remainder of the 2010 season he signed with Portugal FC of the Canadian Soccer League. He recorded his first goal on July 23, 2010, in a match against London City. Jonke would help Portugal qualify for the playoffs by finishing fifth in the overall standings. In the first round of the postseason Portugal faced Milltown F.C., and advanced to the next round by winning the series by a score 3-2. In the semi-finals the club faced Brantford Galaxy, but were eliminated by a score of 5–3.

On March 7, 2011, Jonke signed with FC Edmonton of the second division North American Soccer League. In his debut season with Edmonton, he helped the team qualify for the postseason by finishing fifth in the overall standings. Edmonton faced the Fort Lauderdale Strikers in the postseason, but were eliminated by a score 5-0. In 2014, he signed with Vaughan Azzurri in the newly formed League1 Ontario.

=== International ===
Jonke was a member of the Canada U-20 men's national soccer team squad that took part in the 2005 Jeux de la Francophonie tournament. He made his Canada U-20 debut on December 6, 2005, against the Cameroon national football team. He would also appear in two other matches for Canada in their group stage, playing against Haiti, and Côte d'Ivoire, losing both matches which resulted in Canada being eliminated from the tournament.

== Career statistics ==
(correct as of 18 March 2010)

Club	Season	League			Cup			Play-Offs			Total		
Club	Season	Apps	Goals	Assists	Apps	Goals	Assists	Apps	Goals	Assists	Apps	Goals	Assists
AC Oulu	2009	10	1	?	1	1	?	-	-	-	11	2	?
Crystal Palace Baltimore	2010	1	0	0	0	0	0	-	-	-	1	0	0
Total	2009–present	1	0	0	0	0	0	-	-	-	1	0	0
Career Total	2009–present	11	1	?	1	1	?	-	-	-	12	2	0

== Personal life ==
Jonke was born in 1987 to Frank and Joanne Jonke. His older brother, Frank Jr., is also a professional soccer player; he studied Major in Sports Administration alongside him at the University of Louisville, and also played with him at Oulu in Finland.
