= Paul Matthijs =

Dutch footballer and manager (born 1976)

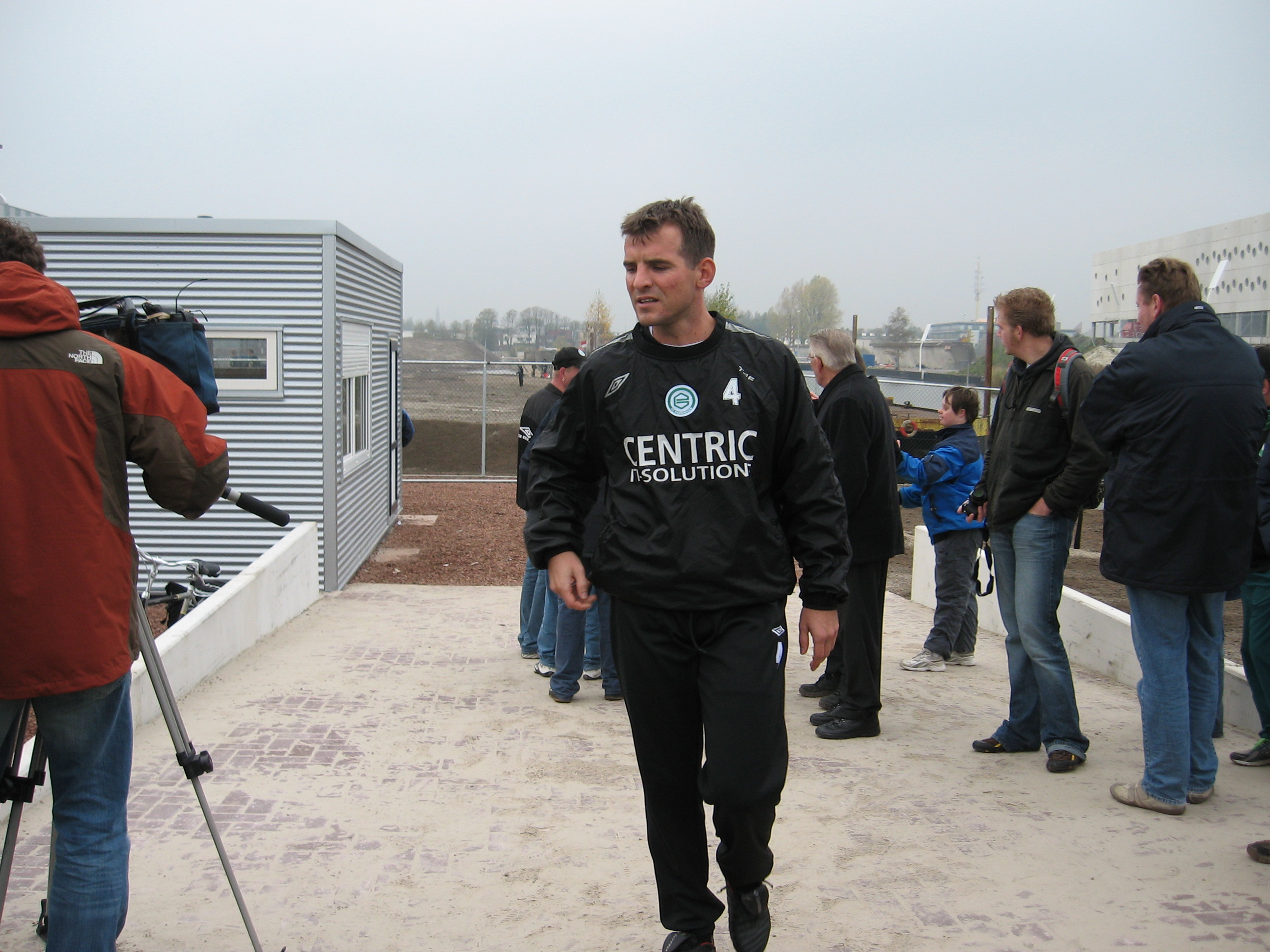
- Matthijs with Groningen in 2006

Personal information
- Date of birth: 5 October 1976 (age 50)
- Place of birth: Paterswolde, Netherlands
- Height: 1.76 m (5 ft 9 in)
- Position: Midfielder

Team information
- Current team: Be Quick 1887 (manager)

Youth career
- 1991–1994: VV Actief
- 1994–1997: Groningen

Senior career*
Years	Team	Apps	(Gls)
1997–2000	Groningen	79	(2)
2000–2002	AZ	29	(1)
2002–2009	Groningen	174	(6)
2009–2010	Veendam	34	(0)
2011	FC Edmonton	4	(0)
Total		320	(9)

Managerial career
- 2013–2022: Groningen (youth)
- 2023–: Be Quick 1887
- * Club domestic league appearances and goals

Paul Matthijs (born 5 October 1976) is a Dutch professional football manager and former player who is the head coach of Vierde Divisie club Be Quick 1887.

== Playing career ==
Matthijs started his football career with VV Actief, before joining FC Groningen. On 20 August 1997, Matthijs made his debut against FC Volendam as a substitute in the 80th minute. Then, he was only 20 years old. After three seasons playing regularly for FC Groningen, AZ Alkmaar signed him. His time at AZ was not successful, and after a disappointing season, he returned to Groningen. In the 2005–06 Eredivisie season, he also reached European football with his side. He left Groningen in 2009 to join Eerste Divisie team BV Veendam.

On 6 May 2010 Matthijs signed a contract for FC Edmonton, a new club preparing to enter the North American second division in 2011. After playing for the team during its 2010 exhibition season he signed a new contract with Edmonton for the 2011 season, its first in the North American Soccer League, on 28 February 2011. He made his debut for Edmonton on 7 May 2011, in a game against the Atlanta Silverbacks. The club released Matthijis on 12 October 2011 after the conclusion of the 2011 season.

== Coaching career ==
Matthijs became a youth coach for Groningen after retiring from playing, coaching various youth levels between 2013 and 2022. As coach of the under-17 team, he led them to the national title in 2019.

On 1 February 2023, Matthijs was appointed manager of Vierde Divisie club Be Quick 1887, starting from the 2023–24 season.
