= Mike Palacio =

American soccer player (born 1986)

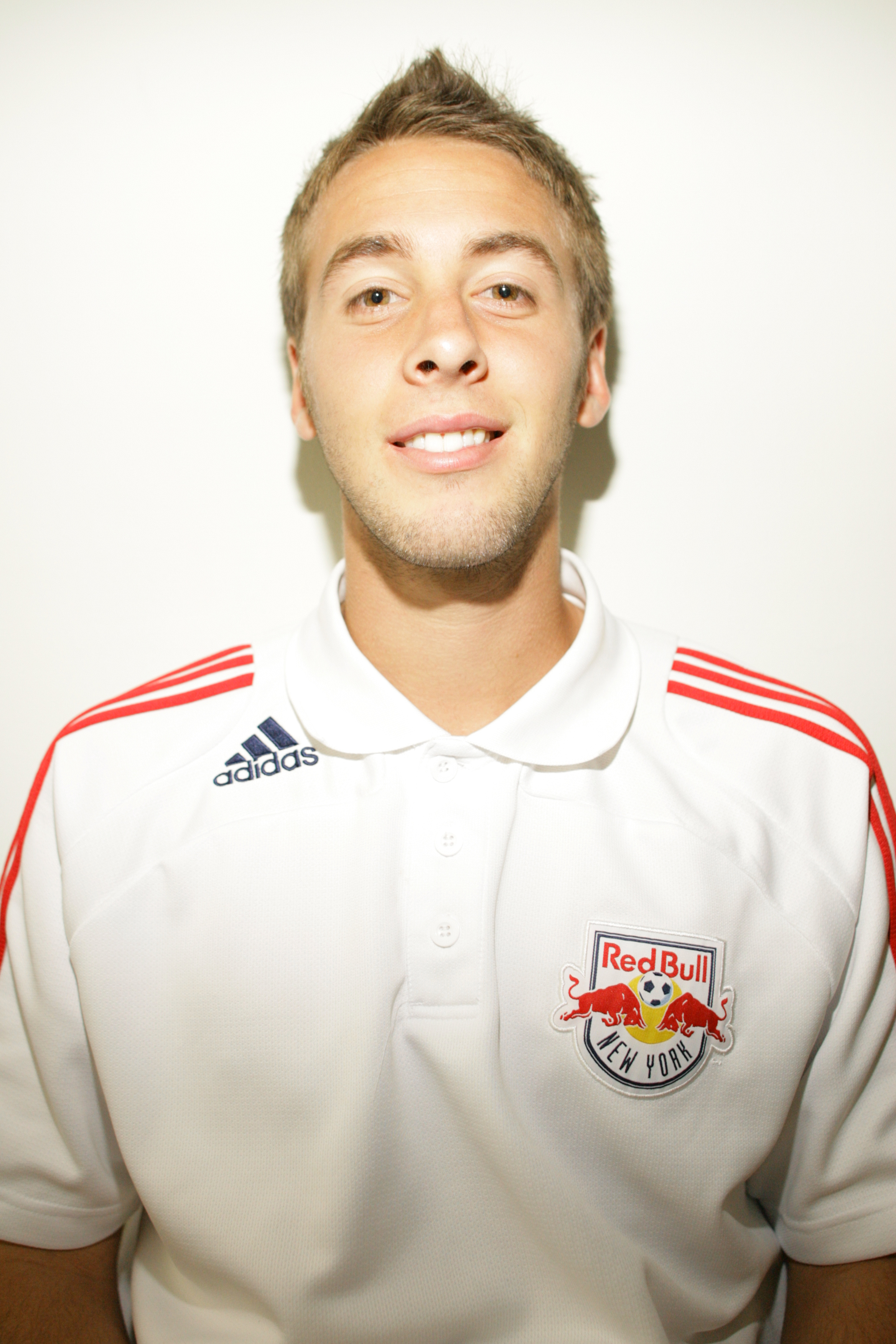

Personal information
- Full name: Michael Palacio
- Date of birth: 29 August 1986 (age 40)
- Place of birth: Long Beach, New York, United States
- Height: 1.83 m (6 ft 0 in)
- Position: Attacking midfielder

Youth career
- Blau-Weiss Gottschee

College career
| Years | Team | Apps | (Gls) |
| 2004–2007 | Stony Brook Seawolves | | |

Senior career*
| Years | Team | Apps | (Gls) |
| 2006 | Fort Wayne Fever | 6 | (0) |
| 2007 | Long Island Rough Riders | 11 | (2) |
| 2008 | New York Red Bulls | 0 | (0) |
| 2009 | Long Island Rough Riders | 15 | (6) |
| 2009–2010 | Radnički Obrenovac | 25 | (3) |
| 2010 | New York Pancyprian-Freedoms | | |
| 2011 | Fort Lauderdale Strikers | 17 | (1) |
| 2012 | Carolina RailHawks | 21 | (3) |

Managerial career
- –2018: Nassau Lions (asst.)
- 2019–: Nassau Lions (associate head coach)
- * Club domestic league appearances and goals as of September 26, 2012

Michael Palacio (born August 29, 1986, in Long Beach, New York) is an American soccer player.

== Career ==
=== Youth and college ===
Palacio was a four-year letterwinner at center midfield at Long Beach High School where he holds school records for assists in a game, season and career. He was named first team all-state as a senior, three time all-county selection. Michael also emerged from one of the top soccer clubs in the NY area Blau-Weiss Gottschee Soccer Club, at Gottschee he excelled and developed many of his future attributes in becoming a prolific attacking midfielder.

Palacio played college soccer at Stony Brook University under head coach Cesar Markovic. Palacio was a three-time selection on the All-America East First Team, and was named to the NSCAA All-Northeast Region Second Team in his junior season. He is the Stony Brook all-time leader in assists and was named the America East Midfielder of the Year in 2006 and also was instrumental in Stony Brook's run to the NCAA tournament in 2005, Michael led the team with 25 points 7 goals 11 assists.

During his college years Palacio also played with Fort Wayne Fever in the USL Premier Development League.

=== Professional ===
Palacio was drafted by New York Red Bulls in the second round, 21st overall, in the 2008 MLS Supplemental Draft, where he played alongside teammate from college Chris Megaloudis. Unfortunately, in a scrimmage match against New England Revolution he suffered a torn ACL making him miss the rest of the season. Following the surgeries (knee and appendix) and a 14-month recovery, Palacio signed with Long Island Rough Riders of the USL Premier Development League where he had the opportunity to show that his recovery was completed, scoring an additional 6 goals in 15 appearances in 2009

Following the end of the 2009 PDL season, Palacio, together with his Stony Brook teammate Petar Raković, traveled to Europe where, while preparing for trials with some clubs in Denmark and training in Serbia, he was invited to take part in a friendly game between Radnički Obrenovac and Serbian SuperLiga club OFK Belgrade. The match ended with a 1–1 draw, with Palacio scored his team's only goal, and the Obrenovac offered him a contract. Palacio played with Obrenovac throughout the 2009–2010 season, scoring 3 goals in 25 games, before returning to the United States in the summer of 2010.

After a brief stint playing for New York-based amateur club New York Pancyprian-Freedoms during their 2010 Lamar Hunt US Open Cup run, Palacio signed with Fort Lauderdale Strikers of the North American Soccer League on March 16, 2011.

Palacio signed with Carolina RailHawks of the NASL in January 2012.

== Personal ==
Mike's father, Leo Palacio, was a former player at the University of North Carolina. Mike's younger brother Dylan was the national high school wrestling champion in his weight class in 2012.
