= Sam Lam =

Canadian soccer player (born 1988)

Personal information
- Full name: Sam Lam
- Date of birth: December 30, 1988 (age 37)
- Height: 5 ft 8 in (1.73 m)
- Position: Midfielder

College career
Years	Team	Apps	(Gls)
2006–2010	Alberta Golden Bears, Concordia College Alberta		

Senior career*
Years	Team	Apps	(Gls)
2008–2011	Edmonton Drillers (indoor)	22	(21)
2011	FC Edmonton	9	(0)
2012–	Edmonton Scottish		
- * Club domestic league appearances and goals as of May 11, 2011

Sam Lam (born December 30, 1988) is a Canadian professional soccer player.

== Career ==
=== University and college ===
Lam played college soccer at Concordia University College of Alberta as well as with the University of Alberta Golden Bears. He was nominated as an All-Canadian for both schools. Lam dominated the Canada West conference in his final year at Alberta, winning multiple player of the week honours in Canada West and the CIS. He also finished the 2010-11 season as the Canada West points leader.

=== Professional ===
Lam participated with Canada's national team training program in 2004 and 2006. After trials as a youth in Europe with some top clubs in England and the Netherlands in 2006, Lam came back to Canada to attend the University of Alberta in the CIS league where he was the youngest starter for the team at 17 years old. After the U of A season Lam went to Holland and played with FC Volendam's U19 team.

In 2008, Lam played for the Edmonton Drillers indoor soccer team in the PASL/CMISL league as one of the team leaders in scoring and points. He then attended Concordia University College of Alberta in 2009, playing in the ACAC and winning All-Canadian honours that year. He then was selected to play with FC Edmonton in the 2011 exhibition season. After his exhibition play with FC Edmonton he attended the University of Alberta and had a dominating season, leading the league in points and winning first team All-Canadian honours again. He then signed a professional contract to play with FC Edmonton. He made his professional debut in the team's first competitive game on April 9, 2011, a 2–1 victory over the Fort Lauderdale Strikers.
