= Paul Craig (soccer) =

Canadian soccer player (born 1988)

Personal information
- Date of birth: 14 March 1988 (age 38)
- Place of birth: Charlottetown, Prince Edward Island
- Height: 1.83 m (6 ft 0 in)
- Position: Striker

Youth career
- UPEI Panthers
- Saskatchewan Huskies

Senior career*
Years	Team	Apps	(Gls)
2008–2009	Avondale Islanders		
2010	Thunder Bay Chill	9	(1)
2011–2012	FC Edmonton	28	(4)
2015–2019	Halifax City	70	
- * Club domestic league appearances and goals as of 24 September 2012

Paul Craig (born 14 March 1988) is a Canadian soccer player most well known for his time spent with FC Edmonton.

== Career ==
=== Youth and amateur ===
Craig came to recognition through his performance with his university team, UPEI Panthers. Craig was team MVP, a CIS second team all-star, and was second in the country in goals in his last year with the Panthers. Craig then transferred to the University of Saskatchewan and after sitting out a season as per CIS rules, he went on to be a key component in getting the Huskies to a franchise best second-place finish in the CIS West, leading the team with nine assists in 13 games.

Craig also found success at the amateur club level with the Avondale Islanders. Craig led the team to a Bronze Medal at the 2008 Canadian National Challenge Cup, leading the tournament with six goals in four matches for the Islanders. Craig also appeared at the 2009 Canadian Challenge Trophy, this time representing Saskatchewan with Huskies Alumni.

Craig's also played with the Thunder Bay Chill of the USL Premier Development League in 2010 season, scoring one goal in nine appearances and helping Chill to the PDL National Championship game, which they lost to the Portland Timbers U23's.

=== Professional ===
Craig turned professional in 2011 when he signed with FC Edmonton in the North American Soccer League. He made his professional debut with them on 1 May 2011 against the Montreal Impact, and scored his first goal, a game winner, on 7 May against the Atlanta Silverbacks. In 13 appearances in the regular season, Craig had 2 goal and added 3 assists with both goals being game winners.

In the 2012 season, Craig made 15 appearances in league play and had two goals and one assist. His season was hampered by a groin injury which has kept him out of the line-up for part of the season. Craig also saw playing time in both of FC Edmonton's Canadian Championship games.

Following the 2012 outdoor season, Craig played the 2012-13 indoor season with the Rochester Lancers of the Major Indoor Soccer League. Craig scored his first goal of the season on 22 December in a losing effort against the Syracuse Silver Knights.
