= Conrad Smith (footballer) =

Trinidad and Tobago footballer

Personal information
- Full name: Conrad Smith
- Date of birth: April 12, 1981 (age 45)
- Place of birth: Port of Spain, Trinidad and Tobago
- Height: 5 ft 9 in (1.75 m)
- Position: Forward

Youth career
- 2001–2003: Caledonia AIA

Senior career*
| Years | Team | Apps | (Gls) |
| 2004 | Calgary Mustangs | 22 | (6) |
| 2004–2005 | Arima/Morvant Fire | | |
| 2005 | Toronto Lynx | 5 | (1) |
| 2005–2006 | San Juan Jabloteh | 3 | (0) |
| 2006–2008 | Caledonia AIA | | |
| 2009–2010 | Joe Public | 24 | (36) |
| 2011 | FC Edmonton | 14 | (0) |
| 2011–2014 | Caledonia AIA | | |
| 2014–2016 | Morvant Caledonia United | | |

International career
| 2001–2008 | Trinidad and Tobago | 24 | (9) |
- * Club domestic league appearances and goals as of May 11, 2011

Conrad Smith (born April 12, 1981 in Port of Spain) is a Trinidad and Tobago football player.

== Career ==
=== Professional ===
Smith attended Malick Secondary Comprehensive School, and was part of the youth team of Trinidadian side Caledonia AIA, before turning professional in Canada in 2004 with the Calgary Mustangs in the old USL First Division. He returned to Trinidad and played extensively in the Trinidadian TT Pro League, for San Juan Jabloteh, Caledonia AIA, and Joe Public, with whom he won a league champions medal in 2009.

Smith was signed by FC Edmonton of the new North American Soccer League in 2011, and made his debut for Edmonton in the team's first competitive game on April 9, 2011, a 2-1 victory over the Fort Lauderdale Strikers. The club released Smith on October 12, 2011 after the conclusion of the 2011 season.

=== International ===
Smith made his debut for the Trinidad and Tobago national team in 2001 and has since gone on to play for the Soca Warriors 24 times, scoring 5 goals.
