= Rein Baart =

Dutch footballer (born 1972)

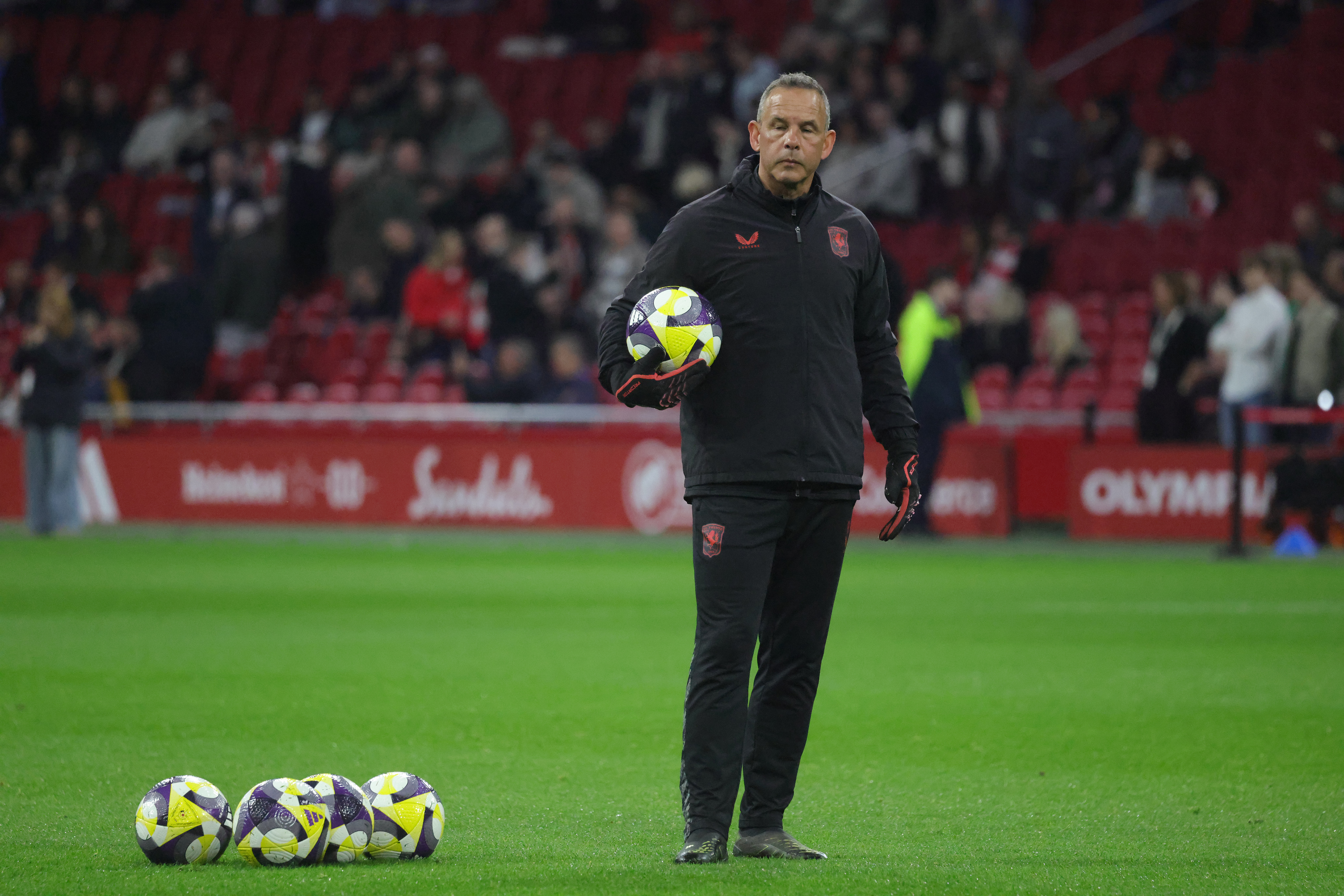

Personal information
- Full name: Rein Baart
- Date of birth: 13 April 1972 (age 54)
- Place of birth: Oosterbeek, Netherlands
- Height: 1.81 m (5 ft 11 in)
- Position: Goalkeeper

Youth career
- ESCA
- v.v. SCH
- Vitesse Arnhem

Senior career*
Years	Team	Apps	(Gls)
1996–1998	TOP Oss	14	(0)
1998–2002	VVV-Venlo	79	(0)
2002–2005	Fortuna Sittard	95	(0)
2005–2006	Babberich		
2006–2007	VVV-Venlo	39	(0)
2007–2010	NEC	1	(0)
2011	FC Edmonton	24	(0)
2012–2014	FC Oss	2	(0)
Total		254	(0)
- * Club domestic league appearances and goals as of 1 August 2016

Rein Baart (born 13 April 1972) is a Dutch former footballer.

== Career ==
=== Netherlands ===
Baart has extensive experience playing in the Eerste Divisie in the Netherlands, having played for TOP Oss, VVV-Venlo, SV Babberich, Fortuna Sittard. He was part of the VVV-Venlo team which won promotion to the Eredivisie at the end of the 2006/2007 season, before moving to and NEC; he spent the next four years in Nijmegen, but only made one league start for the team.

=== Canada ===
Baart was signed by coach Dwight Lodeweges to play for FC Edmonton in 2010, and played in several exhibition games prior to the team's first season in the North American Soccer League. He made his competitive debut for the team in their first official game on April 9, 2011, a 2-1 victory over the Fort Lauderdale Strikers.

At the end of the 2011 season, Edmonton announced that Baart had declined a contract offer and would not return to the club in 2012.
