= Chris Kooy =

Canadian soccer player (1982–2020)

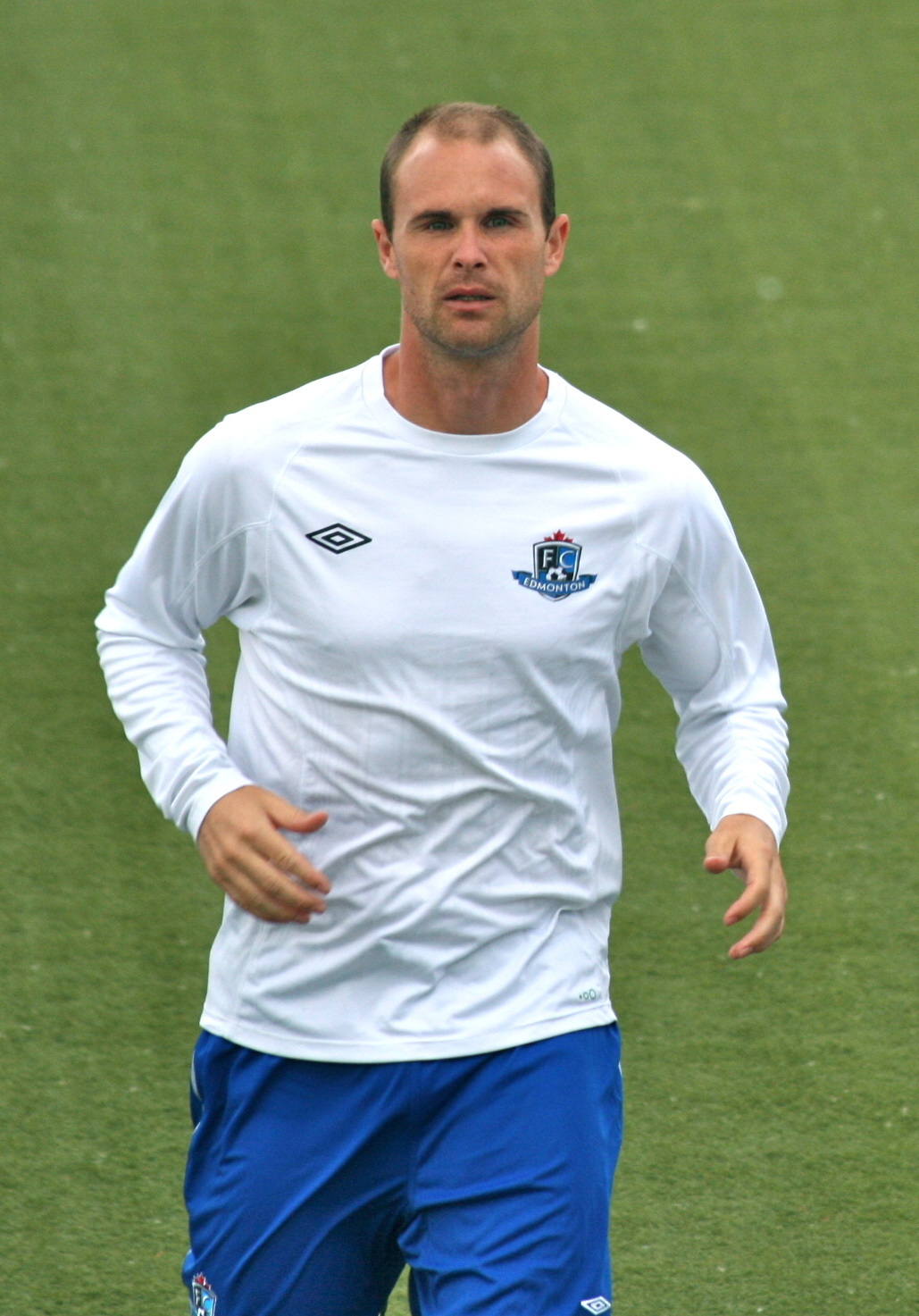

Personal information
- Full name: Christopher John Kooy
- Date of birth: June 11, 1982
- Place of birth: Saskatoon, Saskatchewan, Canada
- Date of death: August 21, 2020 (aged 38)
- Place of death: Edmonton, Alberta, Canada
- Height: 6 ft 0 in (1.83 m)
- Position: Midfielder

College career
| Years | Team | Apps | (Gls) |
| 2000–2003 | Mount Royal Cougars | | |

Senior career*
| Years | Team | Apps | (Gls) |
| 2004 | Calgary Mustangs | 12 | (0) |
| 2005–2009 | Calgary Callies | | |
| 2010 | Calgary United (indoor) | 7 | (5) |
| 2011–2012 | FC Edmonton | 51 | (1) |
- * Club domestic league appearances and goals as of September 28, 2012 ‡ National team caps and goals as of August 24, 2020

Christopher John Kooy (June 11, 1982 – August 22, 2020) was a Canadian soccer player who played for FC Edmonton in the North American Soccer League.

== Career ==
=== Professional ===
In 2004, Kooy played a championship season with Mount Royal College (Voted ACIC All Canadian) and the Calgary Mustangs in the old USL First Division. He also played with Canadian senior amateur side Calgary Callies in the Alberta Major Soccer League, with whom he won National Club Championships in 2003, 2007 and 2008. He was playing with Edmonton Scottish in the Alberta Major Soccer League and was instrumental in helping the club win their first National Club Championship, and his fourth, in 2016.

After a brief trial with Scottish first division club Livingston in 2008, Kooy was signed by FC Edmonton of the new North American Soccer League, and took part in their 2010 exhibition season in preparation for the team's entry into the NASL in 2011.

After playing professional indoor soccer for the Calgary United in the Canadian Major Indoor Soccer League in 2009 and 2010, he made his debut for Edmonton in the team's first competitive game on April 9, 2011, a 2–1 victory over the Fort Lauderdale Strikers. He scored his first professional goal on May 11, 2011, in a 1–1 tie with FC Tampa Bay. The club exercised Kooy's option for the 2013 season on December 4, 2012, but was released by the club on Saturday, March 2, 2013.

Kooy died of colon cancer on August 22, 2020, at the age of 38.
