= André Duberry =

Canadian soccer player

Personal information
- Full name: André Duberry
- Date of birth: August 24, 1982 (age 44)
- Place of birth: Calgary, Alberta, Canada
- Height: 6 ft 0 in (1.83 m)
- Position: Defender

Youth career
- 2004–2006: Mount Royal Cougars

Senior career*
Years	Team	Apps	(Gls)
2004–2009	Calgary Callies		
2011	FC Edmonton	4	(0)
- * Club domestic league appearances and goals as of March 21, 2012

André Duberry (born August 24, 1982) is a Canadian former soccer player.

== Career ==
=== Youth and college ===
Born in Calgary, Alberta, Duberry played four years of college soccer at the Mount Royal College, winning a national championship in 2004 and being named an All-Canadian in 2006.

=== Professional ===
After playing with Canadian amateur side Calgary Callies, with whom he won National Championships in 2007 and 2008, and participating in trials with Scottish clubs Livingston and Peterhead in 2008, Duberry played with FC Edmonton throughout their exhibition season in 2010. He signed a formal professional contract in March 2011 prior to FC Edmonton's debut season in the new North American Soccer League, and made his professional debut on April 20, 2011, in 2-0 loss to the Carolina RailHawks. The club re-signed Duberry for the 2012 season on October 12, 2011.
