= Dominic Oppong =

Ghanaian-born Canadian soccer player

Personal information
- Full name: Dominic Ansah-Oppong
- Date of birth: January 21, 1986 (age 40)
- Place of birth: Kumasi, Ghana
- Height: 6 ft 0 in (1.83 m)
- Position: Midfielder

Youth career
- 2005–2006: Cincinnati Bearcats
- 2007–2008: Buffalo Bulls

Senior career*
Years	Team	Apps	(Gls)
2007–2008	Toronto Lynx	10	(0)
2009	Buffalo City FC	19	(1)
2009	North York Astros	2	(0)
2010	Harrisburg City Islanders	24	(1)
2010	Portugal FC	9	(0)
2011–2012	FC Edmonton	42	(0)
2014	AC Oulu	27	(0)
2015	Atlanta Silverbacks	15	(0)

International career^{‡}
2005	Canada U20	9	(0)
- * Club domestic league appearances and goals as of February 23, 2016 ‡ National team caps and goals as of April 17, 2010

Dominic Ansah-Oppong (born January 21, 1986) is a Ghanaian-born Canadian former soccer player.

== Career ==
=== College and amateur ===
Oppong grew up in Scarborough, Ontario, attended St John Henry Newman CHS (Cardinal Newman CHS at the time), and played two years of college soccer at the University of Cincinnati, before transferring to the University at Buffalo prior to his junior year. He was an All-MAC Second Team selection in 2008.

During his college years Oppong also played for the Toronto Lynx in the USL Premier Development League. He made his Lynx debut on June 15, 2007, in a 4–0 defeat to the Michigan Bucks, and in 2008 helped the Lynx reach the playoffs for the first time since the 2000 season.

=== Professional ===
After leaving college, Oppong signed with Buffalo City of the National Premier Soccer League in 2009. He appeared in 19 matches and recorded one goal and added six assists for the team.

Oppong was among the new additional signings made by North York Astros head coach Vladimir Klinovsky midway through the 2009 CSL season to strengthen his squad as it attempted to qualify for the playoffs, but left the team after making only two appearances. He later played briefly for the Edmonton Drillers in the Canadian Major Indoor Soccer League.

On April 8, 2010, Oppong signed with the Harrisburg City Islanders of the USL Second Division. He made his debut for Harrisburg on May 7, against the Charlotte Eagles coming on as a substitute for Kai Kasiguran. After Harrisburg failed to secure a postseason berth he signed with Portugal FC of the Canadian Soccer League for the remainder of the 2010 season. Oppong signed with the new FC Edmonton side of the North American Soccer League on March 3, 2011. The club re-signed Oppong for the 2012 season on October 12, 2011.

After spending 2014 with Finnish side AC Oulu, Oppong returned to North America and signed with NASL side Atlanta Silverbacks on February 5, 2015. He made his debut for Atlanta on April 4 against Indy Eleven.

=== International ===
Oppong made his debut for the Canada U-20 men's national soccer team on December 6, 2005, in a game against Cameroon at the Francophone Games, and went on to appear in all three matches of their group stage.

== Managerial career ==
In 2019, Oppong became an academy coach for Sole Soccer Camp.

== Club statistics ==
Club performance			League		Cup		Total	
Season	Club	League	Apps	Goals	Apps	Goals	Apps	Goals
Canada			League		Voyageurs Cup		Total	
2011	FC Edmonton	NASL	22	0	2	0	24	0
Total	Canada		22	0	2	0	24	0
Career total			22	0	2	0	24	0

== Personal ==
Oppong's brother Victor was long-time member of several youth teams from Canadian Soccer Association and played for many teams in Germany including SV Waldhof Mannheim, SG Sonnenhof Großaspach, SV Sandhausen, 1. FC Saarbrücken and VfR Mannheim. In 2017, he served as an assistant coach under Julian de Guzman for USL side Ottawa Fury FC. After professional soccer he was employed as a personal trainer for Propel Performance Institute.
