= Harry Sinkgraven =

Dutch footballer (born 1966)

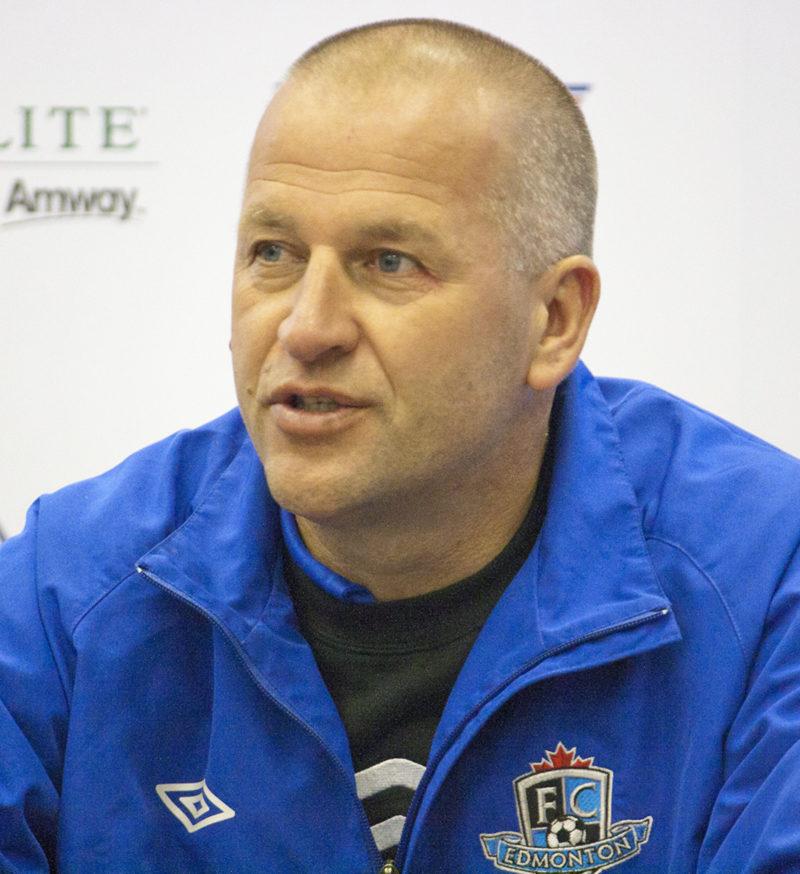
- Sinkgraven in 2011

Personal information
- Full name: Harm Sinkgraven
- Date of birth: 21 January 1966 (age 60)
- Place of birth: Assen, Netherlands
- Position: Midfielder

Senior career*
Years	Team	Apps	(Gls)
1988–1990	Groningen	25	(0)
1990–1994	Cambuur	97	(3)
1994–2001	FC Zwolle	212	(4)
Total		334	(7)

Managerial career
- 2001–2006: FC Zwolle (assistant)
- 2006: FC Zwolle
- 2006–2007: Indonesia Olympic
- 2007–2009: SC Heerenveen women (coach)
- 2009–2010: FC Emmen
- 2010–2012: FC Edmonton
- * Club domestic league appearances and goals

Harm "Harry" Sinkgraven (born 21 January 1966) is a Dutch football coach and former professional player.

He managed Canadian soccer team FC Edmonton from December 2010 until he was released by the club in September 2012.

== Playing career ==
Born in Assen, Sinkgraven played for FC Groningen, SC Cambuur and FC Zwolle, making over 300 league career appearances.

== Coaching career ==
Sinkgraven spent a number of years as assistant manager at FC Zwolle, before taking charge of the Indonesian Olympic team in 2006. Sinkgraven left a year later, returning to the Netherlands to coach at the women's football club of SC Heerenveen, before managing FC Emmen for a year.

Sinkgraven took charge of Canadian soccer team FC Edmonton in December 2010 until he was released by the club in September 2012.

== Personal life ==
His son Daley is also a professional footballer.
