= Shaun Saiko =

Canadian soccer player (born 1989)

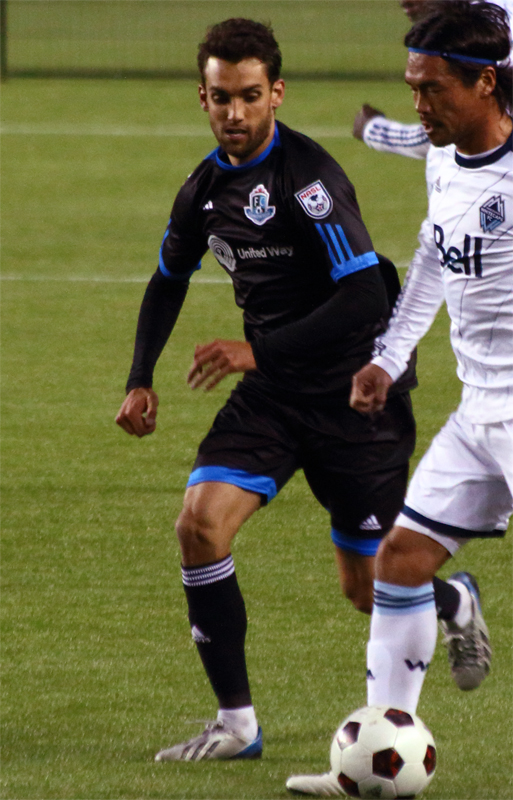

Personal information
- Full name: Shaun Saiko
- Date of birth: November 13, 1989 (age 36)
- Place of birth: St. Albert, Alberta, Canada
- Height: 5 ft 10 in (1.78 m)
- Position: Midfielder

Youth career
- NTC Prairies
- 2006–2009: Middlesbrough

Senior career*
Years	Team	Apps	(Gls)
2009–2010	Middlesbrough	0	(0)
2011–2013	FC Edmonton	66	(18)
2014	San Antonio Scorpions	3	(1)
Total		69	(19)

International career^{‡}
2008–2009	Canada U20	6	(1)
2012	Canada U23	2	(0)
- * Club domestic league appearances and goals as of June 22, 2014 ‡ National team caps and goals as of August 21, 2011

Shaun Saiko (born November 13, 1989) is a Canadian former professional soccer player who played as a midfielder.

== Career ==
=== Club ===
After impressing during a trial, Saiko began his professional career with Middlesbrough in the English Football League Championship. Despite playing extensively with the reserves he never made a first team appearance for the club and was released at the end of the 2009-10 season.

Returning home to Canada, he was signed by FC Edmonton of the new North American Soccer League in 2011. He scored the first goal in franchise history on April 9, 2011, in a 2-1 victory over the Fort Lauderdale Strikers. The club re-signed Saiko for the 2012 season on October 12, 2011.

In May 2012, he was named the NASL player of the month for his five goals and two assists, including a hat trick against the Carolina Railhawks.

On November 5, 2013 it was announced that Saiko had been released from FC Edmonton.

On November 26, 2013 San Antonio Scorpions announced that Saiko has signed with the club for the 2014 season. Saiko made six appearances for a total of 183 minutes played, and scored one goal. He was released from his contract on August 6, 2014.

=== International ===
Saiko has played for Canadian national youth teams at U15, U20 and U23 levels, and was part of the Canadian team which took part in the 2009 CONCACAF U-20 Championship and attempted to qualify for the FIFA U-20 World Cup.
