= Kyle Yamada =

Canadian soccer player (born 1983)

Personal information
- Full name: Kyle Yamada
- Date of birth: April 12, 1983 (age 43)
- Place of birth: Calgary, Alberta, Canada
- Height: 6 ft 1 in (1.85 m)
- Position: Midfielder

Youth career
- 2006–2009: Lethbridge Kodiaks

Senior career*
| Years | Team | Apps | (Gls) |
| 2009–2010 | Calgary United (indoor) | 14 | (10) |
| 2011 | FC Edmonton | 20 | (3) |

International career
| 2006 | Canada beach soccer team | | |
- * Club domestic league appearances and goals as of September 28, 2012

Kyle Yamada (born April 12, 1983 in Calgary, Alberta) is a Canadian soccer player.

== Career ==
=== Youth and college ===
Yamada played four years of college soccer at Lethbridge College, and despite suffering a serious knee injury in his debut season, was named to the All-Canadian soccer team by the Canadian Colleges Athletic Association in 2009.

=== Professional ===
Yamada played professional indoor soccer for the Calgary United in the Canadian Major Indoor Soccer League in 2010, before being signed by FC Edmonton of the new North American Soccer League in 2011. He made his professional debut in the team's first competitive game on April 9, 2011, a 2-1 victory over the Fort Lauderdale Strikers, and scored his first professional goal on May 31 in a 4-0 win over FC Tampa Bay.The club re-signed Yamada for the 2012 season on October 12, 2011.

=== International ===
Yamada is a beach soccer player, and played for Canada at the 2006 CONCACAF Beach Soccer Championship and the 2006 FIFA Beach Soccer World Cup.
