= Eddy Sidra =

Canadian soccer player (born 1989)

Personal information
- Full name: Eddy Mahir Sidra
- Date of birth: February 20, 1989 (age 37)
- Place of birth: Khartoum, Sudan
- Height: 1.78 m (5 ft 10 in)
- Position: Defender

Youth career
- 2005: Green & Gold Soccer Academy
- 2005: Edmonton Juventus
- 2007–2008: Energie Cottbus

College career
Years	Team	Apps	(Gls)
2006–2007	University of Alberta		
2012–2013	University of Alberta	22	(2)

Senior career*
Years	Team	Apps	(Gls)
2008–2010	Energie Cottbus II	56	(0)
2011	FC Edmonton	6	(0)
Total		62	(0)

International career^{‡}
2009	Canada U20	3	(0)
2009–2010	Canada	3	(0)
- * Club domestic league appearances and goals as of September 11, 2011 ‡ National team caps and goals as of February 5, 2017

Eduard Mahir Sidra (born February 20, 1989, in Khartoum) is a Canadian soccer player. He is an attacking defender who often plays on the right side. He married Marie Gilada-Sidra on November 11, 2017.

== Career ==
Eddy Sidra is now an Optometrist working in Dallas.

=== Club ===
Sidra began his career at the Green & Gold Soccer Academy of the University of Alberta for the Alberta Golden Bears in 2006. In October 2007 he had a trial with Energie Cottbus and signed later an amateur contract with them. Sidra played in his first season nineteen games for Energie Cottbus in the A-Junioren Bundesliga Season 2007–08 and in his second season fourteen in the Regionalliga Nord for Energie Cottbus II.

On January 28, 2011 Toronto FC of Major League Soccer verified that Sidra was one of three Canada national team trialists that were traveling to Turkey for preseason camp. David Monsalve and midfielder Gianluca Zavarise were also on trial.

On April 2, 2011 FC Edmonton of the new North American Soccer League announced they had signed Sidra en route to their pre-season tour in Phoenix, Arizona.

The club released Sidra on October 12, 2011, after the conclusion of the 2011 season.

=== International ===
In 2009, Sidra played international matches (as a starter) for the Canada National U-19, U-23 and Senior National Men's Teams. He was a starting selection for Canada at the 2009 CONCACAF Under-20 Men's Championship in Trinidad and Tobago. He earned his first call-up for the Canucks on May 26, 2009 and earned his first senior cap on May 30, 2009, in a friendly game against Cyprus. He was a standout in January 2010 in a friendly game against Jamaica, and in May 2010 a South American friendly match against Venezuela, where he had a run with the ball in extra time from left defense, going through the entire Venezuela team to the goal just outside the box, where he was fouled. A free kick was awarded, that set up the goal to tie, with no time left. The outstanding run was played on highlight reels on sports televisions globally (https://www.youtube.com/watch?v=_ZYhIEKf6Jk). His national team positions have been versatile, playing as an attacking wing defender that jumps into the attack (like Roberto Carlos), as an attacking Midfielder (left & right) or as a stay at home defender. He typically plays the full 90 min of every game. Sidra was apparently contacted to play in the recent national team matches against Peru and Honduras but was ultimately not a part of the squad.

== Honours ==
- 2006–07: University of Alberta Golden Bears' soccer rookie of the year
