= Chris Lemire =

Canadian soccer player (born 1983)

Personal information
- Date of birth: November 3, 1983 (age 43)
- Place of birth: Edmonton, Alberta, Canada
- Height: 5 ft 7 in (1.70 m)
- Position: Forward

Senior career*
Years	Team	Apps	(Gls)
2002	Calgary Storm	19	(4)
2003–2004	Montreal Impact	21	(1)
2004	Edmonton Aviators	12	(0)
2005–2009	Calgary Callies		
2008–2010	Edmonton Drillers (indoor)	15	(9)
2011	Edmonton	4	(0)
Total		71	(14)

International career
2002–2003	Canada U20	5	(1)
2006–2008	Canada (beach soccer)	10	(7)
- * Club domestic league appearances and goals

Chris Lemire (born November 3, 1983, in Edmonton, Alberta) is a Canadian former soccer player who played as a forward.

== Career ==
=== Professional ===
Lemire played professionally with the Calgary Storm, Montreal Impact, and the Edmonton Aviators old USL First Division, and is the only former Aviator to play for both the old and new Edmonton professional soccer franchises.

Lemire was signed by Edmonton of the new North American Soccer League, and took part in their 2010 exhibition season in preparation for the team's entry into the NASL in 2011.

After playing professional indoor soccer for the Edmonton Drillers in the Canadian Major Indoor Soccer League in 2010, he made his debut for Edmonton in the team's first competitive game on April 9, 2011, a 2–1 victory over the Fort Lauderdale Strikers. The club released Lemire on October 12, 2011, after the conclusion of the 2011 season.

=== International ===
Lemire has international experience with the Canada national under-20 team, including four games at the 2003 FIFA World Youth Championship. He also represented his country as a member of the Canada national beach soccer team as they competed for the 2006 CONCACAF Beach Soccer Championship in Mexico.
