= Lance Parker =

American soccer player and model (born 1985)

Personal information
- Full name: Lance Andrew Parker
- Date of birth: August 19, 1985 (age 41)
- Place of birth: Oklahoma City, Oklahoma, United States
- Height: 1.92 m (6 ft 4 in)
- Position: Goalkeeper

Youth career
- 2000–2004: Putnam City North Panthers

College career
Years	Team	Apps	(Gls)
2004–2007	Missouri State Bears		

Senior career*
Years	Team	Apps	(Gls)
2005	Chicago Fire Premier	1	(0)
2006	DFW Tornados	1	(0)
2007	Colorado Rapids U-23	8	(0)
2008–2009	Chivas USA	4	(0)
2010	Miami FC	0	(0)
2011–2014	FC Edmonton	46	(0)
- * Club domestic league appearances and goals as of November 2, 2014

Lance Andrew Parker (born August 19, 1985) is an American soccer player and model.

As a model, Parker has appeared on several magazine covers, and in such magazines as Men's Health, GQ, and Vogue Hommes.

== Early life ==
Parker was born on August 19, 1985, in Oklahoma City, Oklahoma, to Susan and Dennis Parker. He attended Putnam City North High School in Oklahoma City, where he was an all-district performer in soccer during his sophomore season. As a junior, Parker achieved all-conference and all-district honors while helping his team to a conference championship and a state semifinals appearance. As a senior, he earned a spot on Oklahoma's All-State Boys' Soccer Team, and was a Gatorade All-America nominee. Parker graduated from Putnam City North with a 4.0 grade-point average.

After high school, Parker attended Missouri State University (MSU) on various academic and athletic scholarships which covered his educational expenses in full. Parker made the Dean's List every semester while at MSU. Parker was a member of the National Society of Collegiate Scholars, and of Phi Eta Sigma, an honors fraternity. He graduated in 2007, cum laude, with a B.S. in General Business.

== Soccer career ==
=== College and amateur ===
Parker played college soccer all four of his years at Missouri State, from 2004 to 2007, and served as team captain for two of those years. He had his best season statistically as a junior in 2006. That year, Parker set school records for lowest goals-against average (GAA) in a season (0.57) and for fewest goals allowed in a season (9). These marks both led the Missouri Valley Conference (MVC). Parker also led the MVC in save percentage, at 84.5%. His GAA and save percentage ranked, respectively, seventh and eleventh in the NCAA. In 2006 and 2007, Parker was named to the MVC All-Conference Second Team, the MVC Academic All-Conference First Team, and the College Sports Information Directors' Academic All-District VII First Team.

During this time, Parker also played for various amateur clubs, including Chicago Fire Premier, DFW Tornados, and Colorado Rapids U-23, all of which belong, or belonged, to the USL Premier Development League.

=== Professional ===
Parker was signed by Major League Soccer (MLS) club Chivas USA in 2008. He made his professional debut on July 13, 2008, in the North American SuperLiga, an international soccer competition which pitted MLS teams against international clubs. Chivas USA lost the match, 2–1, to C.F. Pachuca, a club from Liga MX—Mexico's top-level professional soccer league. Parker made his MLS debut on August 8, 2009, against the Colorado Rapids in a 4–0 loss. Two weeks later, he earned his first win—and shutout—in a 2–0 Chivas victory over Toronto FC.

After his two-year stint with Chivas USA, Parker signed with Miami FC of the USSF Division 2 Professional League in March 2010, and spent one season with the club. The following season, Miami FC moved to the NASL and became the Fort Lauderdale Strikers.

In February 2011, Parker signed with expansion side FC Edmonton of the NASL, and played only three games for the club, but only allowed two goals. Parker's season was prematurely ended by two freak injuries, one involving a compound fracture to his right arm, and the other, a fractured foot. These injuries kept Parker off of the pitch until partway through the 2012 season.

Parker returned to the pitch in spring 2012, less than a year after his arm fracture. In his third start back in goal, on the one-year anniversary of his breaking his arm, Parker blocked a penalty kick and made two "highlight-reel" saves in the driving rain, with his team down to 10 players, to preserve a 1–0 victory over the Fort Lauderdale Strikers. Parker was named NASL Defensive Player of the Week for his efforts. For the season, Parker tallied 16 starts in goal, and gave up 21 goals for a GAA of 1.313—good for 5th in the league.

In 2013, Parker put together his first complete season for FC Edmonton, appearing in 20 of the club's 26 matches. He accumulated the third-most minutes played among NASL goalkeepers (1735), and led the league in save percentage (80.8%). In addition, Parker posted the second-lowest GAA (0.950) of any keeper in the league, and the lowest of those who played the full season. Parker missed out on the 2013 Golden Gloves Award, presented annually to the NASL goalkeeper with the lowest GAA for the season, by mere hundredths of a point to a keeper who had only played in the second half of the season and, thus, appeared in just enough matches to meet the minimum requirement for the award.

As a result of various injuries, Parker retired from professional soccer after the 2016 season.

== Modeling/acting career ==
In 2012, Parker was chosen as Oklahoma's representative in the Cosmopolitan Bachelor of the Year contest.

After he was approached at an airport by a modeling-industry executive who took note of his "nice legs," Parker began doing part-time modeling work to supplement his soccer income. He has appeared on the cover of five magazines: Complot, Profile, Fantastics, Sensitif, and Avenue Edmonton.

Parker has also appeared in such magazines as Vogue Hommes, VMAN, Men's Health, GQ, Cosmopolitan, Ocean Drive, and Canadian Cowboy Country, and has done modeling work for Abercrombie & Fitch, Babies "R" Us, Baileys & Giordano, and Puma, among others.

Parker is currently enjoying a successful modeling career on the mainboard at RED Model Management in New York City. He has landed fragrance campaigns with Oscar de la Renta and Nautica, among others.

Parker is also acting and is currently represented by Abrams Artist Agency in New York City.

== Health coaching ==
Since his retirement from professional soccer, in addition to working as a professional model and actor, Parker has obtained certifications as a nutrition coach and personal trainer, and has launched a health-coaching business called "Parker Peak Performance."

In his spare time, Parker enjoys riding unicycles, dancing, juggling, and performing magic, as well as outdoor activities such as rock climbing, mountain biking, backpacking and camping.
