= Antonio Rago =

Canadian soccer player

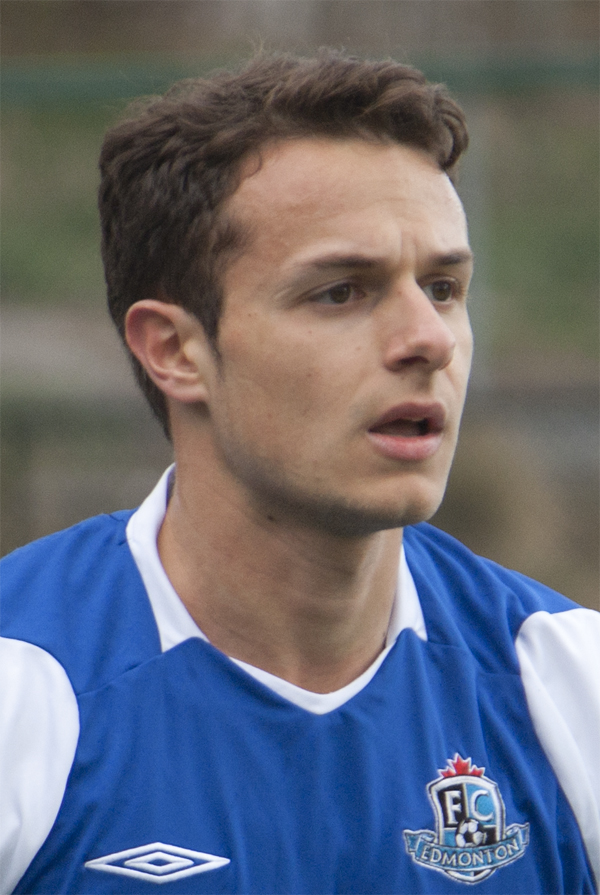

Personal information
- Full name: Antonio Rago
- Date of birth: March 17, 1990 (age 36)
- Place of birth: St. Albert, Alberta, Canada
- Height: 5 ft 8 in (1.73 m)
- Position: Defender

Youth career
- Green & Gold Soccer Academy

Senior career*
Years	Team	Apps	(Gls)
2008	Whitecaps Residency	15	(0)
2010	Edmonton Drillers (indoor)	7	(1)
2011–2013	FC Edmonton	69	(0)

International career
2006–2007	Canada U17		
- * Club domestic league appearances and goals as of November 8, 2013

Antonio Rago (born November 5, 1990) is a Canadian former soccer player.

== Career ==
=== Youth and college ===
Rago played at the University of Alberta's Green & Gold Soccer Academy under head coach Len Vickery, before joining the Vancouver Whitecaps residency program in July 2007. He went on to play with the Vancouver Whitecaps Residency team in the USL Premier Development League, while training with the senior Whitecaps side.

=== Professional ===
Rago played professional indoor soccer for the Edmonton Drillers in the Canadian Major Indoor Soccer League in 2010, before being signed by FC Edmonton of the new North American Soccer League in 2011. He made his professional debut in the team's first competitive game on April 9, 2011, a 2–1 victory over the Fort Lauderdale Strikers. The club re-signed Rago for the 2012 season on October 12, 2011.

=== International ===
Rago, played for the Canadian U-17 national team in 2006 and 2007, scoring a goal in a friendly victory against Northern Ireland in the Ballymena International Tournament, and competing in the 2007 Chivas Cup in Guadalajara, Mexico.
