= 2011 Toronto FC season =

Toronto FC 2011 soccer season

Toronto FC
2011 season
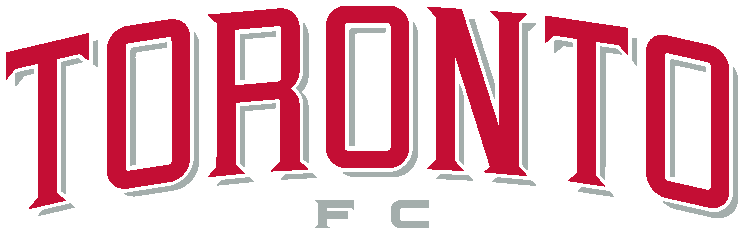
- Head coach / technical director: Aron Winter
- Stadium: BMO Field
- Major League Soccer: Conference: 8th Overall: 16th
- MLS Cup playoffs: Did not qualify
- Canadian Championship: Winners
- 2011–12 CONCACAF Champions League: Semi-finals
- Top goalscorer: League: Danny Koevermans (8); All: Danny Koevermans (10)
- Highest home attendance: 22,453
- Average home league attendance: 20,267
| Home colours | Away colours |

The 2011 MLS season was the fifth season in Toronto FC's existence. The club once again failed to make the playoffs; however, they won the Canadian Championship, and strong performances near the end of the season helped them in qualifying to the semi-finals of the 2011–12 CONCACAF Champions League.

Toronto's first league game was played on March 19, 2011, against Vancouver Whitecaps FC. It was the first match between two Canadian clubs in Major League Soccer history. Dwayne De Rosario scored the 8,000th goal in league history in a match against the Vancouver Whitecaps. The first home match was March 26, 2011, versus the other 2011 expansion club, Portland Timbers. The regular season ended on October 22, 2011.

Across all competitions, Toronto FC finished 2011 with a record of 14–15–17, with 59 points in 46 matches.

== Club ==
=== Management team ===
| Position | Staff |
|---|---|
| Head Coach & Technical Director | (Netherlands) Aron Winter |
| Director of Player Development | (England) Paul Mariner |
| First Assistant Coach | (Netherlands) Bob de Klerk |
| Goalkeeping Coach | (Canada) Mike Toshack |
| Assistant Coach | (Canada) Jason Bent |
| Director of Team and Player Operations | (Canada) Earl Cochrane |

Last updated: February 24, 2011
Source: Toronto FC

== Squad ==
=== Squad list ===
As of October 22, 2011.

Note: Flags indicate national team as defined under FIFA eligibility rules; some limited exceptions apply. Players may hold more than one non-FIFA nationality.

| No. | Pos. | Nation | Player |
|---|---|---|---|
| 2 | DF | PAN | Demitrius Omphroy |
| 3 | DF | ENG | Andy Iro |
| 4 | DF | CAN | Doneil Henry |
| 5 | DF | CAN | Ashtone Morgan |
| 6 | MF | CAN | Julian de Guzman |
| 7 | FW | ECU | Joao Plata (on loan from LDU Quito) |
| 8 | MF | USA | Eric Avila |
| 9 | FW | JAM | Ryan Johnson |
| 11 | MF | USA | Nathan Sturgis |
| 12 | DF | CAN | Adrian Cann |
| 13 | FW | CAN | Keith Makubuya |
| 14 | FW | NED | Danny Koevermans |
| 15 | MF | CAN | Matt Stinson |
| 16 | MF | CAN | Oscar Cordon |
| 17 | MF | NED | Elbekay Bouchiba |
| 18 | FW | NED | Nick Soolsma |
| 19 | DF | BEL | Mikael Yourassowsky |

| No. | Pos. | Nation | Player |
|---|---|---|---|
| 20 | DF | USA | Ty Harden |
| 21 | MF | FRA | Léandre Griffit |
| 22 | MF | GER | Torsten Frings |
| 23 | MF | CAN | Terry Dunfield |
| 24 | GK | SUI | Stefan Frei |
| 25 | DF | RSA | Danleigh Borman |
| 26 | MF | USA | Matt Gold |
| 27 | DF | ENG | Richard Eckersley (on loan from Burnley F.C.) |
| 28 | MF | CAN | Gianluca Zavarise |
| 29 | DF | USA | Kyle Davies |
| 30 | GK | SRB | Miloš Kočić |
| 31 | DF | JAM | Dicoy Williams |
| 33 | FW | CUW | Javier Martina |
| 37 | FW | CAN | Nicholas Lindsay |
| 55 | DF | GLP | Eddy Viator |
| 70 | FW | USA | Peri Marošević |
| 75 | FW | USA | Spencer Thompson |

=== Squad information ===
| No. | Name | Nationality | Position | Date of Birth (Age at year end) | Previous club | Club Appearances | Club Goals |
Goalkeepers
| 24 | Stefan Frei | (Switzerland) | GK | April 20, 1986 (aged 25) | (United States) University of California, Berkeley | 95 | 0 |
| 30 | Miloš Kocić | (Serbia) | GK | June 4, 1985 (aged 26) | (United States) D.C. United | 20 | 0 |
Defenders
| 2 | Demitrius Omphroy | (Panama) | RB/RW | May 30, 1989 (aged 22) | (United States) University of California, Berkeley | 1 | 0 |
| 3 | Andy Iro | (England) | CB | November 26, 1984 (aged 27) | (United States) Columbus Crew | 20 | 0 |
| 4 | Doneil Henry | (Canada) | CB | April 20, 1993 (aged 18) | (Canada) TFC Academy | 21 | 0 |
| 5 | Ashtone Morgan | (Canada) | LB | February 9, 1991 (aged 20) | (Canada) TFC Academy | 23 | 0 |
| 12 | Adrian Cann | (Canada) | CB | September 19, 1980 (aged 31) | (Denmark) Esbjerg fB | 49 | 0 |
| 20 | Ty Harden | (United States) | CB | March 6, 1984 (aged 27) | (United States) Colorado Rapids | 54 | 1 |
| 25 | Danleigh Borman | (South Africa) | LB/LM | January 27, 1985 (aged 26) | (United States) New York Red Bulls | 29 | 0 |
| 27 | Richard Eckersley | (England) | RB/LB | March 12, 1989 (aged 22) | (England) Burnley F.C. (on loan) | 33 | 0 |
| 29 | Kyle Davies | (United States) | CB | April 11, 1989 (aged 22) | (United States) Los Angeles Galaxy | 1 | 0 |
| 31 | Dicoy Williams | (Jamaica) | CB | October 7, 1986 (aged 25) | (Jamaica) Harbour View F.C. | 10 | 0 |
| 55 | Eddy Viator | (Guadeloupe) | CB/RB | June 2, 1982 (aged 29) | (France) Amiens SC | 4 | 0 |
Midfielders
| 6 | Julian de Guzman | (Canada) | CM/DM | March 25, 1981 (aged 30) | (Spain) Deportivo de La Coruña | 70 | 3 |
| 8 | Eric Avila | (United States) | AM | November 24, 1987 (aged 24) | (United States) FC Dallas | 9 | 1 |
| 11 | Nathan Sturgis | (United States) | CM/DM/LB | July 6, 1987 (aged 24) | (Canada) Vancouver Whitecaps FC | 16 | 0 |
| 15 | Matt Stinson | (Canada) | CM | September 9, 1992 (aged 19) | (Canada) TFC Academy | 19 | 0 |
| 16 | Oscar Cordon | (Canada) | CM | January 18, 1993 (aged 18) | (Canada) TFC Academy | 8 | 0 |
| 17 | Elbekay Bouchiba | (Netherlands) | CM | November 1, 1978 (aged 33) | (Qatar) Al Wakrah | 0 | 0 |
| 19 | Mikael Yourassowsky | (Belgium) | LM/CM/LB | February 26, 1983 (aged 28) | (Croatia) NK Rijeka | 26 | 1 |
| 21 | Léandre Griffit | (France) | RW/LW | May 21, 1984 (aged 27) | (United States) Columbus Crew | 1 | 0 |
| 22 | Torsten Frings | (Germany) | DM/CM | November 22, 1976 (aged 35) | (Germany) Werder Bremen | 19 | 0 |
| 23 | Terry Dunfield | (Canada) | CM | February 20, 1982 (aged 29) | (Canada) Vancouver Whitecaps FC | 10 | 0 |
| 26 | Matt Gold | (United States) | CM | June 14, 1988 (aged 23) | (United States) Ohio State University | 6 | 0 |
| 28 | Gianluca Zavarise | (Canada) | CM/AM | July 28, 1986 (aged 25) | (Greece) Iraklis | 15 | 0 |
Attackers
| 7 | Joao Plata | (Ecuador) | LW/RW | March 1, 1992 (aged 19) | (Ecuador) LDU Quito (on loan) | 35 | 8 |
| 9 | Ryan Johnson | (Jamaica) | ST/AM | November 26, 1984 (aged 27) | (United States) San Jose Earthquakes | 20 | 6 |
| 13 | Keith Makubuya | (Canada) | ST/RW | January 26, 1993 (aged 18) | (Canada) TFC Academy | 1 | 0 |
| 14 | Danny Koevermans | (Netherlands) | ST | November 1, 1978 (aged 33) | (Netherlands) PSV | 17 | 10 |
| 18 | Nick Soolsma | (Netherlands) | RW/LW | January 17, 1988 (aged 23) | (Netherlands) VV Young Boys | 32 | 3 |
| 33 | Javier Martina | (Curaçao) | RW/LW/CF | February 1, 1987 (aged 24) | (Netherlands) Ajax | 27 | 2 |
| 37 | Nicholas Lindsay | (Canada) | RW/LW | September 3, 1992 (aged 19) | (Canada) TFC Academy | 8 | 0 |
| 70 | Peri Marošević | (United States) | CF/RW | May 5, 1989 (aged 22) | (United States) FC Dallas | 14 | 3 |

== Player movement ==
=== Transfers ===
==== In ====
| Date | Player | Position | Previous club | Fee/notes | Ref |
|---|---|---|---|---|---|
| November 25, 2010 | (United States) Nathan Sturgis | MF | (Canada) Vancouver Whitecaps FC | Acquired for a 1st round SuperDraft pick | |
| March 9, 2011 | (Netherlands) Elbekay Bouchiba | MF | (Qatar) Al-Wakrah | Free Transfer | |
| March 9, 2011 | (Netherlands) Nick Soolsma | FW | (Netherlands) VV Young Boys | Free Transfer | |
| March 9, 2011 | (Curaçao) Javier Martina | FW | (Netherlands) Ajax | Free Transfer | |
| March 11, 2011 | (Canada) Gianluca Zavarise | MF | (Greece) Iraklis | Free Transfer | |
| March 11, 2011 | (United States) Alan Gordon | FW | (United States) Chivas USA | Acquired for Nick LaBrocca | |
| March 16, 2011 | (Panama) Demitrius Omphroy | DF | (United States) University of California, Berkeley | SuperDraft, 2nd round | |
| March 17, 2011 | (Canada) Ashtone Morgan | DF | (Canada) TFC Academy | Graduated From Academy | |
| March 17, 2011 | (Canada) Oscar Cordon | MF | (Canada) TFC Academy | Graduated From Academy | |
| March 17, 2011 | (Canada) Matt Stinson | MF | (Canada) TFC Academy | Graduated From Academy | |
| March 17, 2011 | (Canada) Keith Makubuya | FW | (Canada) TFC Academy | Graduated From Academy | |
| March 18, 2011 | (United States) Matt Gold | MF | (United States) Ohio State | SuperDraft, 3rd round | |
| March 18, 2011 | (Belgium) Mikael Yourassowsky | DF | (Croatia) NK Rijeka | Free Transfer | |
| March 31, 2011 | (Jamaica) Dicoy Williams | DF | (Jamaica) Harbour View F.C. | Undisclosed | |
| April 1, 2011 | (Cameroon) Tony Tchani | MF | (United States) New York Red Bulls | Acquired with a 2012 SuperDraft 1st round pick for Dwayne De Rosario | |
| April 1, 2011 | (South Africa) Danleigh Borman | DF | (United States) New York Red Bulls | Acquired with a 2012 SuperDraft 1st round pick for Dwayne De Rosario | |
| June 29, 2011 | (Netherlands) Danny Koevermans | FW | (Netherlands) PSV Eindhoven | Undisclosed | . |
| June 29, 2011 | (Germany) Torsten Frings | MF | (Germany) Werder Bremen | Undisclosed | . |
| July 14, 2011 | (Canada) Terry Dunfield | MF | (Canada) Vancouver Whitecaps FC | Allocation Money & Future Considerations | |
| July 14, 2011 | (Jamaica) Ryan Johnson | FW | (United States) San Jose Earthquakes | Acquired along with allocation money and an international roster slot for Nana Attakora, Jacob Peterson, and Alan Gordon | |
| July 15, 2011 | (England) Andy Iro | DF | (United States) Columbus Crew | Acquired for Tony Tchani | |
| July 15, 2011 | (France) Léandre Griffit | MF | (United States) Columbus Crew | Acquired for Tony Tchani | |
| July 20, 2011 | (Guadeloupe) Eddy Viator | DF | (France) Amiens SC | Free Transfer | |
| July 28, 2011 | (United States) Dasan Robinson | DF | (United States) Chicago Fire | Acquired for Dan Gargan and a 2nd round 2012 SuperDraft pick | |
| July 28, 2011 | (United States) Peri Marošević | FW | (United States) FC Dallas | Free Transfer | |
| August 2, 2011 | (United States) Eric Avila | MF | (United States) FC Dallas | Acquired for Maicon Santos and a 2011 international roster slot | |
| September 15, 2011 | (United States) Kyle Davies | DF | (United States) Los Angeles Galaxy | Acquired for Dasan Robinson | |

==== Out ====
| Date | Player | Position | Destination club | Fee/notes | Ref |
|---|---|---|---|---|---|
| November 24, 2010 | (Jamaica) O'Brian White | FW | (Canada) Vancouver Whitecaps FC | Expansion Draft | |
| November 24, 2010 | (Canada) Gabe Gala | MF | (Canada) Mississauga Eagles FC | Waived | |
| November 24, 2010 | (Argentina) Martin Šarić | MF | (Paraguay) Sportivo Luqueño | Waived | |
| November 24, 2010 | (Russia) Maxim Usanov | DF | (Russia) FC Petrotrest | Waived | |
| November 24, 2010 | (Latvia) Raivis Hščanovičs | DF | (Latvia) FK Jūrmala-VV | Waived, free transfer | |
| November 24, 2010 | (Spain) Mista | FW | | Waived | |
| November 30, 2010 | (Cameroon) Joseph Nane | MF | (United States) Colorado Rapids | Traded for a 3rd round 2012 SuperDraft pick | |
| December 3, 2010 | (United States) Nick Garcia | DF | | Option declined | |
| December 3, 2010 | (United States) Fuad Ibrahim | FW | (United States) Minnesota Stars FC | Waived | |
| December 3, 2010 | (The Gambia) Amadou Sanyang | MF | (United States) Seattle Sounders FC | Waived, free transfer | |
| January 13, 2011 | (United States) Chad Barrett | FW | (United States) Los Angeles Galaxy | Traded for undisclosed future considerations | |
| January 13, 2011 | (United States) Jon Conway | GK | (United States) Chicago Fire | Traded for a 3rd round 2011 SuperDraft pick | |
| March 1, 2011 | (The Gambia) Emmanuel Gómez | DF | (The Gambia) Samger | Waived | |
| March 11, 2011 | (United States) Nick LaBrocca | MF | (United States) Chivas USA | Traded for Alan Gordon | |
| March 30, 2011 | (Canada) Josh Janniere | MF | (United States) Colorado Rapids | Traded for a 3rd round 2013 Supplemental Draft pick | |
| April 1, 2011 | (Canada) Dwayne De Rosario | MF | (United States) New York Red Bulls | Traded for Tony Tchani, Danleigh Borman, and a 1st round 2012 SuperDraft pick | |
| July 14, 2011 | (Canada) Nana Attakora | DF | (United States) San Jose Earthquakes | Traded for allocation money, an international roster slot and Ryan Johnson | |
| July 14, 2011 | (United States) Jacob Peterson | MF | (United States) San Jose Earthquakes | Traded for allocation money, an international roster slot and Ryan Johnson | |
| July 14, 2011 | (United States) Alan Gordon | FW | (United States) San Jose Earthquakes | Traded for allocation money, an international roster slot and Ryan Johnson | |
| July 15, 2011 | (Cameroon) Tony Tchani | MF | (United States) Columbus Crew | Traded for Andy Iro and Léandre Griffit | |
| July 28, 2011 | (United States) Dan Gargan | DF | (United States) Chicago Fire | Traded with a 2nd round 2012 SuperDraft pick for Dasan Robinson | |
| August 2, 2011 | (Brazil) Maicon Santos | FW | (United States) FC Dallas | Traded with a 2011 international roster slot for Eric Avila | |
| September 15, 2011 | (United States) Dasan Robinson | DF | (United States) Los Angeles Galaxy | Traded for Kyle Davies | |

=== Loans ===
==== In ====
| Date | Player | Position | Loaned from | Fee/notes | Ref |
|---|---|---|---|---|---|
| March 24, 2011 | (Ecuador) Joao Plata | FW | (Ecuador) LDU Quito | SuperDraft, 3rd round | |
| March 24, 2011 | (Serbia) Alen Stevanović | MF | (Italy) Torino F.C. | Recalled on June 19, 2011 | |
| April 15, 2011 | (England) Richard Eckersley | DF | (England) Burnley F.C. | | |

== Competitions ==
=== Pre-season ===
Win Draw Loss

| February 2, 2011 Friendly | Toronto FC | 1–1 | FK Partizan | Antalya, Turkey |
| | Attakora 6'; Henry (yellow card) 62' (yellow-red card) 90+' | Toronto FC | Tomić 41' (pen.) |

| February 6, 2011 Friendly | Toronto FC | 1–0 | Red Star Belgrade | Antalya, Turkey |
| | Stinson 41' | Toronto FC |

| February 10, 2011 Friendly | Toronto FC | 1–3 | NK Dinamo Zagreb | Antalya, Turkey |
| | Zavarise 46'; Zavarise (red card) 77' | Toronto FC | Sylvestr 1'; Brezovec 7'; Tomečak (red card) 41'; Ibáñez (red card) 59'; Barbarić 81' (pen.) |

| February 24, 2011 2011 Walt Disney World Pro Soccer Classic | Toronto FC | 2–3 | Houston Dynamo | ESPN Wide World of Sports Complex |
| | Peterson 7'; De Rosario 30' (pen.) | Toronto FC | Cameron 10'; Davis 43'; Weaver 69' |

| February 26, 2011 2011 Walt Disney World Pro Soccer Classic | Orlando City S.C. | 1–0 | Toronto FC | ESPN Wide World of Sports Complex |
| | Fuller 76' | Toronto FC |

| March 3, 2011 Friendly | College of Charleston | 0–1 | Toronto FC | Charleston, South Carolina, USA |
| | | Toronto FC | Plata 40' (pen.) |

| March 5, 2011 Carolina Challenge Cup | Toronto FC | 0–1 | Chicago Fire | Blackbaud Stadium |
| | | Toronto FC | Pappa 6' |

| March 9, 2011 Carolina Challenge Cup | Charleston Battery | 2–1 | Toronto FC | Blackbaud Stadium |
| | Kelly 43'; Zaher 57' | Toronto FC | Sturgis 14' (pen.) |

| March 12, 2011 Carolina Challenge Cup | Toronto FC | 2–2 | D.C. United | Blackbaud Stadium |
| | De Rosario 19' (pen.); Maicon Santos 28' | Toronto FC | Davies 12'; Ngwenya 61' |

=== MLS regular season ===
Eastern Conference
| Pos | Team | Pld | W | L | T | GF | GA | GD | Pts | Qualification |
|---|---|---|---|---|---|---|---|---|---|---|
| 1 | Sporting Kansas City | 34 | 13 | 9 | 12 | 50 | 40 | +10 | 51 | Qualification for the conference semifinals |
| 2 | Houston Dynamo | 34 | 12 | 9 | 13 | 45 | 41 | +4 | 49 | Qualification for the conference semifinals |
| 3 | Philadelphia Union | 34 | 11 | 8 | 15 | 44 | 36 | +8 | 48 | Qualification for the conference semifinals |
| 4 | Columbus Crew | 34 | 13 | 13 | 8 | 43 | 44 | −1 | 47 | Qualification for the play-in round |
| 5 | New York Red Bulls | 34 | 10 | 8 | 16 | 50 | 44 | +6 | 46 | Qualification for the play-in round |
| 6 | Chicago Fire | 34 | 9 | 9 | 16 | 46 | 45 | +1 | 43 | |
| 7 | D.C. United | 34 | 9 | 13 | 12 | 49 | 52 | −3 | 39 | |
| 8 | Toronto FC | 34 | 6 | 13 | 15 | 36 | 59 | −23 | 33 | |
| 9 | New England Revolution | 34 | 5 | 16 | 13 | 38 | 58 | −20 | 28 | |

Source: MLS

Overall
| Pos | Team | Pld | W | L | T | GF | GA | GD | Pts | |
|---|---|---|---|---|---|---|---|---|---|---|
| 1 | LA Galaxy (S, C) | 34 | 19 | 5 | 10 | 48 | 28 | +20 | 67 | Qualification for the 2012–13 CONCACAF Champions League group stage |
| 2 | Seattle Sounders FC (U) | 34 | 18 | 7 | 9 | 56 | 37 | +19 | 63 | Qualification for the 2012–13 CONCACAF Champions League group stage |
| 3 | Real Salt Lake | 34 | 15 | 11 | 8 | 44 | 36 | +8 | 53 | Qualification for the 2012–13 CONCACAF Champions League group stage |
| 4 | FC Dallas | 34 | 15 | 12 | 7 | 42 | 39 | +3 | 52 | |
| 5 | Sporting Kansas City | 34 | 13 | 9 | 12 | 50 | 40 | +10 | 51 | |
| 6 | Houston Dynamo | 34 | 12 | 9 | 13 | 45 | 41 | +4 | 49 | Qualification for the 2012–13 CONCACAF Champions League group stage |
| 7 | Colorado Rapids | 34 | 12 | 9 | 13 | 44 | 41 | +3 | 49 | |
| 8 | Philadelphia Union | 34 | 11 | 8 | 15 | 44 | 36 | +8 | 48 | |
| 9 | Columbus Crew | 34 | 13 | 13 | 8 | 43 | 44 | −1 | 47 | |
| 10 | New York Red Bulls | 34 | 10 | 8 | 16 | 50 | 44 | +6 | 46 | |
| 11 | Chicago Fire | 34 | 9 | 9 | 16 | 46 | 45 | +1 | 43 | |
| 12 | Portland Timbers | 34 | 11 | 14 | 9 | 40 | 48 | −8 | 42 | |
| 13 | D.C. United | 34 | 9 | 13 | 12 | 49 | 52 | −3 | 39 | |
| 14 | San Jose Earthquakes | 34 | 8 | 12 | 14 | 40 | 45 | −5 | 38 | |
| 15 | Chivas USA | 34 | 8 | 14 | 12 | 41 | 43 | −2 | 36 | |
| 16 | Toronto FC (V) | 34 | 6 | 13 | 15 | 36 | 59 | −23 | 33 | Qualification for the 2011–12 CONCACAF Champions League preliminary round |
| 17 | New England Revolution | 34 | 5 | 16 | 13 | 38 | 58 | −20 | 28 | |
| 18 | Vancouver Whitecaps FC | 34 | 6 | 18 | 10 | 35 | 55 | −20 | 28 | |

Source: MLS
Rules for classification: 1) points; 2) head-to-head record; 3) goal difference; 4) number of goals scored
(C) MLS Cup champions; (S) Supporters' Shield winners; (U) U.S. Open Cup winners; (V) Canadian Championship winners

==== Results summary ====
| Overall | | | | | | | | Home | | | | | | Away | | | | | |
| Pld | Pts | W | L | T | GF | GA | GD | W | L | T | GF | GA | GD | W | L | T | GF | GA | GD |
|---|---|---|---|---|---|---|---|---|---|---|---|---|---|---|---|---|---|---|---|
| 34 | 33 | 6 | 13 | 15 | 36 | 59 | −23 | 5 | 4 | 8 | 18 | 21 | −3 | 1 | 9 | 7 | 18 | 38 | −20 |

Last updated: October 22, 2011
Source: 2011 Major League Soccer season
Pld = Matches played; Pts = Points; W = Matches won; T = Matches tied; L = Matches lost; GF = Goals for; GA = Goals against; GD = Goal difference

==== Results by round ====
| Round | 1 | 2 | 3 | 4 | 5 | 6 | 7 | 8 | 9 | 10 | 11 | 12 | 13 | 14 | 15 | 16 | 17 | 18 | 19 | 20 | 21 | 22 | 23 | 24 | 25 | 26 | 27 | 28 | 29 | 30 | 31 | 32 | 33 | 34 |
|---|---|---|---|---|---|---|---|---|---|---|---|---|---|---|---|---|---|---|---|---|---|---|---|---|---|---|---|---|---|---|---|---|---|---|
| Ground | A | H | H | A | H | H | H | A | H | A | H | A | H | H | A | A | H | A | H | A | A | H | A | A | A | H | A | H | A | H | A | H | A | H |
| Result | L | W | T | T | T | L | T | L | W | L | T | T | L | T | T | T | L | L | W | L | L | L | L | T | T | W | L | T | W | W | L | T | T | T |
| Position | 16 | 12 | 10 | 9 | 10 | 15 | 13 | 15 | 14 | 15 | 15 | 15 | 16 | 17 | 17 | 17 | 17 | 17 | 16 | 17 | 17 | 17 | 18 | 17 | 17 | 17 | 17 | 17 | 17 | 16 | 16 | 16 | 16 | 16 |

Updated to match(es) played on October 22, 2011. Source: Regular season matches
A = Away; H = Home; W = Win; L = Loss; T = Tie

==== Match results ====
Win Tie Loss

| March 19, 2011 | Vancouver Whitecaps FC | 4–2 | Toronto FC | Empire Field |
| | Hassli 15'; Dunfield 26'; Dunfield (yellow card) 28'; Harris (yellow card) 40'; Hassli (yellow card) 49'; Harris 63'; Hassli 72' | MLSsoccer.com | De Rosario 20'; Sturgis (yellow card) 32'; Gargan (yellow card) 44'; Maicon Santos 74' | Attendance: 22,592; Referee: Paul Ward |

| March 26, 2011 | Toronto FC | 2–0 | Portland Timbers | BMO Field |
| | Martina 14'; Martina 70'; Gordon (yellow card) 71'; Gargan (yellow card) 79'; Yourassowsky (yellow card) 56' (yellow-red card) 84' | MLSsoccer.com | Lowry (yellow card) 77' | Attendance: 20,086; Referee: Silviu Petrescu |

| April 2, 2011 | Toronto FC | 1–1 | Chivas USA | BMO Field |
| | Gordon 36' de Guzman (yellow card) 89' | MLSsoccer.com | Moreno 2' | Attendance: 18,968; Referee: Baldomero Toledo |

| April 9, 2011 | San Jose Earthquakes | 1–1 | Toronto FC | Buck Shaw Stadium |
| | Cronin (yellow card) 36'; Dawkins 38'; Opara (yellow card) 55'; Corrales (yellow card) 84'; Wondolowski (yellow card) 87' | MLSsoccer.com | Gordon 27'; Tchani (yellow card) 35'; Attakora (yellow card) 41' de Guzman (yellow card) 79'; Peterson (yellow card) 93+' | Attendance: 8,928; Referee: Ramón Hernández |

| April 13, 2011 | Toronto FC | 0–0 | Los Angeles Galaxy | BMO Field |
| | Martina (yellow card) 67'; Stevanović (yellow card) 68' | MLSsoccer.com | Beckham (yellow card) 44'; Jordan (yellow card) 76'; Juninho (yellow card) 78' (yellow-red card) 94+' | Attendance: 22,453; Referee: Terry Vaughan |

| April 16, 2011 | Toronto FC | 0–3 | D.C. United | BMO Field |
| | Harden (red card) 49' de Guzman (yellow card) 65'; Gargan (yellow card) 88' | MLSsoccer.com | Pontius 5'; Davies 10'; Pontius (yellow card) 48'; Pontius 73' | Attendance: 16,313; Referee: Mark Kadlecik |

| April 23, 2011 | Toronto FC | 1–1 | Columbus Crew | BMO Field |
| | Tchani (yellow card) 37' (yellow-red card) 42'; Tchani 41' | MLSsoccer.com | Burns (yellow card) 36'; Ekpo (yellow card) 39'; Rentería 49'; James (yellow card) 80'; Rusmir (yellow card) 90' | Attendance: 20,145; Referee: David Gantar |

| April 30, 2011 | Seattle Sounders FC | 3–0 | Toronto FC | Qwest Field |
| | Fernández 9'; Alonso (yellow card) 45'; Evans 52'; Evans 75' (pen.) | MLSsoccer.com | de Guzman (yellow card) 54' | Attendance: 36,287; Referee: Ricardo Salazar |

| May 7, 2011 | Toronto FC | 2–1 | Houston Dynamo | BMO Field |
| | Williams (yellow card) 42'; Plata 50' (pen.); Maicon Santos 81'; Eckersley (yellow card) 88' | MLSsoccer.com | Palmer 87' | Attendance: 20,259; Referee: Jorge Gonzalez |

| May 11, 2011 | FC Dallas | 1–0 | Toronto FC | Pizza Hut Park |
| | Hernández 45+3' (pen.); Luna (yellow card) 90' | MLSsoccer.com | Eckersley (yellow card) 36'; Martina (yellow card) 75'; Borman (yellow card) 79' | Attendance: 8,145; Referee: Yader Reyes |

| May 14, 2011 | Toronto FC | 2–2 | Chicago Fire | BMO Field |
| | Plata 9' de Guzman (yellow card) 25'; Maicon Santos 47' | MLSsoccer.com | Segares (yellow card) 19'; Paladini (yellow card) 28'; Pappa 63'; Barouch 75' | Attendance: 18,674; Referee: Elias Bazakos |

| May 22, 2011 | Colorado Rapids | 0–0 | Toronto FC | Dick's Sporting Goods Park |
| | Wynne (yellow card) 69' | MLSsoccer.com | Martina (yellow card) 83' | Attendance: 13,598; Referee: Abiodun Okulaja |

| May 28, 2011 | Toronto FC | 2–6 | Philadelphia Union | BMO Field |
| | Maicon Santos 50'; Maicon Santos 59' | MLSsoccer.com | Farfan 2'; Mapp 11'; Harvey (yellow card) 39'; Nakazawa 44'; Mapp 62'; Mwanga 72'; Mwanga 89' | Attendance: 20,122; Referee: Niko Bratsis |

| June 4, 2011 | Toronto FC | 0–0 | Sporting Kansas City | BMO Field |
| | Tchani (yellow card) 68'; Eckersley (yellow card) 69' | MLSsoccer.com | Bravo (yellow card) 39'; Zusi (yellow card) 47+'; Aurélien Collin (yellow card) 68' | Attendance: 20,122; Referee: Niko Bratsis |

| June 11, 2011 | Los Angeles Galaxy | 2–2 | Toronto FC | Home Depot Center |
| | Birchall 2'; Beckham (yellow card) 29'; DeLaGarza (yellow card) 83'; Ángel 91+' | MLSsoccer.com | Borman (yellow card) 17'; Henry (yellow card) 57'; Gordon 68'; Gordon (yellow card) 81'; Gordon 94+' | Attendance: 20,675; Referee: Mark Kadlecik |

| June 15, 2011 | New England Revolution | 0–0 | Toronto FC | Gillette Stadium |
| | Phelan (yellow card) 63' | MLSsoccer.com | Yourassowsky (yellow card) 75'; Zavarise (yellow card) 86' (yellow-red card) 91+' | Attendance: 6,680; Referee: Ricardo Salazar |

| June 18, 2011 | Toronto FC | 0–1 | Seattle Sounders FC | BMO Field |
| | Harden (yellow card) 18'; Borman (yellow card) 26'; Yourassowsky (yellow card) 65'; Cordon (yellow card) 94+' | MLSsoccer.com | Hurtado (yellow card) 34' (yellow-red card) 49'; Montero 90' | Attendance: 21,839; Referee: Yader Reyes |

| June 25, 2011 | Real Salt Lake | 3–1 | Toronto FC | Rio Tinto Stadium |
| | Borchers 39'; Saborío 42'; Warner (yellow card) 48'; Saborío 60'; Alexandre (yellow card) 84'; Johnson (yellow card) 85' | MLSsoccer.com | Eckersley (yellow card) 58'; Maicon Santos 66' | Attendance: 15,077; Referee: Niko Bratsis |

| June 29, 2011 | Toronto FC | 1–0 | Vancouver Whitecaps FC | BMO Field |
| | Soolsma 54' (pen.); Plata (yellow card) 89' | MLSsoccer.com | Boxall (yellow card) 27' | Attendance: 19,816; Referee: Mark Geiger |

| July 6, 2011 | New York Red Bulls | 5–0 | Toronto FC | Red Bull Arena |
| | Henry 33'; Rodgers 38'; Rodgers (yellow card) 39'; Lindpere 52'; Tainio (yellow card) 59'; Agudelo 67'; Agudelo 89' | MLSsoccer.com | Soolsma (yellow card) 62' | Attendance: 15,269; Referee: Geoff Gamble |

| July 9, 2011 | Houston Dynamo | 2–0 | Toronto FC | Robertson Stadium |
| | Cruz 50'; Cameron 81'; Cruz (yellow card) 85' | MLSsoccer.com | Eckersley (yellow card) 31'; Gordon (yellow card) 64'; Yourassowsky (yellow card) 68' | Attendance: 19,085; Referee: Hilario Grajeda |

| July 20, 2011 | Toronto FC | 0–1 | FC Dallas | BMO Field |
| | Viator (yellow card) 15'; Iro (yellow card) 77' | MLSsoccer.com | Jackson (yellow card) 40'; Shea 48'; Hernández (yellow card) 88' | Attendance: 21,087; Referee: Hilario Grajeda |

| July 23, 2011 | Sporting Kansas City | 4–2 | Toronto FC | Livestrong Sporting Park |
| | Kamara 28'; Kamara 33'; Bravo 37'; Bravo 64'; Kamara (yellow card) 66'; Zusi (yellow card) 76' | MLSsoccer.com | Viator (yellow card) 31'; Koevermans 50'; Stinson (yellow card) 68'; Johnson 72' | Attendance: 16,382; Referee: Chris Penso |

| July 30, 2011 | Portland Timbers | 2–2 | Toronto FC | Jeld-Wen Field |
| | Johnson 23'; Chará (yellow card) 46+'; Chabala (yellow card) 51'; Jewsbury 57' (pen.) | MLSsoccer.com | Harden (yellow card) 39'; Marošević 71'; Koevermans 81' | Attendance: 18,627; Referee: Kevin Stott |

| August 6, 2011 | D.C. United | 3–3 | Toronto FC | RFK Memorial Stadium |
| | Hamid (red card) 7'; De Rosario 19'; De Rosario 64'; De Rosario (yellow card) 78'; De Rosario 88' (pen.) | MLSsoccer.com | Marošević 52' de Guzman 69'; Koevermans 86' | Attendance: 11,604; Referee: Jasen Anno |

| August 13, 2011 | Toronto FC | 1–0 | Real Salt Lake | BMO Field |
| | Plata 77' | MLSsoccer.com | Johnson (yellow card) 54'; Espindola (yellow card) 62' | Attendance: 21,644; Referee: Mark Kadlecik |

| August 21, 2011 | Chicago Fire | 2–0 | Toronto FC | Toyota Park |
| | Oduro 16'; Gargan 69' | MLSsoccer.com | Borman (yellow card) 77' | Attendance: 12,020; Referee: Gavin Ward |

| August 27, 2011 | Toronto FC | 1–1 | San Jose Earthquakes | BMO Field |
| | Avila 33' | MLSsoccer.com | Burling (yellow card) 33'; Convey (yellow card) 37'; Wondolowski 87' | Attendance: 21,117; Referee: Terry Vaughn |

| September 10, 2011 | Columbus Crew | 2–4 | Toronto FC | Columbus Crew Stadium |
| | Heinemann 67'; Miranda (yellow card) 73'; Mendoza 87' | MLSsoccer.com | Soolsma 21'; Harden (yellow card) 38'; Johnson 42'; Avila (yellow card) 82' de Guzman 83'; Koevermans 92+' | Attendance: 13,058; Referee: Jair Marrufo |

| September 17, 2011 | Toronto FC | 2–1 | Colorado Rapids | BMO Field |
| | de Guzman (yellow card) 38'; Koevermans 52'; Koevermans 60' | MLSsoccer.com | Nyassi (yellow card) 68'; Nyassi 69' | Attendance: 20,318; Referee: Mark Kadlecik |

| September 24, 2011 | Chivas USA | 3–0 | Toronto FC | Home Depot Center |
| | Ángel 12'; Zemanski (yellow card) 54'; Braun 71'; Ángel 77' | MLSsoccer.com | Morgan (yellow card) 8'; Eckersley (yellow card) 27'; Iro (yellow card) 43' | Attendance: 14,357; Referee: Kevin Stott |

| October 1, 2011 | Toronto FC | 1–1 | New York Red Bulls | BMO Field |
| | Koevermans 50' | MLSsoccer.com | Keel (yellow card) 78'; Henry 88' | Attendance: 20,132; Referee: Hilario Grajeda |

| October 15, 2011 | Philadelphia Union | 1–1 | Toronto FC | PPL Park |
| | Le Toux 43' | MLSsoccer.com | Iro (yellow card) 44'; Johnson 57' | Attendance: 19,178; Referee: Silviu Petrescu |

| October 22, 2011 | Toronto FC | 2–2 | New England Revolution | BMO Field |
| | Soolsma 20'; Koevermans 83' | MLSsoccer.com | Zerka 40'; Caraglio 46'; Tierney (yellow card) 70' (yellow-red card) 94+'; Caraglio (yellow card) 88' | Attendance: 21,600; Referee: Michael Kennedy |

=== Canadian Championship ===
| April 27, 2011 Semi-Final Leg 1 | FC Edmonton (Alberta) | 0–3 | (Ontario) Toronto FC | Commonwealth Stadium |
| | Saiko (red card) 24'; Sidra (yellow card) 90+' | Canadasoccer.com | Maicon Santos 35'; Gordon (yellow card) 43'; Gordon 47'; Maicon Santos 61'; Maicon Santos (yellow card) 67' | Attendance: 5,781; Referee: Paul Ward |

| May 4, 2011 Semi-Final Leg 2 | Toronto FC (Ontario) | 1–0 | (Alberta) FC Edmonton | BMO Field |
| | Gordon 21'; Yourassowsky (yellow card) 60' | Toronto FC | | Attendance: 17,937; Referee: Mauricio Navarro |

| May 18, 2011 Final Leg 1 | Vancouver Whitecaps FC (British Columbia) | 1–1 | (Ontario) Toronto FC | Empire Field |
| | Hassli 64'; Koffie (yellow card) 68'; Dunfield (yellow card) 77' | MLSsoccer.com | Williams (yellow card) 52'; Maicon Santos 73' | Attendance: 15,474; Referee: Silviu Petrescu |

| July 2, 2011 Final Leg 2 (Note: Game originally scheduled for May 25 but was cancelled in the 60th minute, with Vancouver up 1-0 on a goal by Eric Hassli in the 17th minute, due to rain. Tournament regulations called for the game to be replayed from the start.) | Toronto FC (Ontario) | 2–1 | (British Columbia) Vancouver Whitecaps FC | BMO Field |
| | Plata 51' (pen.); Martina (yellow card) 56'; Yourassowsky 61' | MLSsoccer.com | Camilo 21'; Hassli (yellow card) 50'; Teibert (yellow card) 72' | Attendance: 18,212; Referee: David Gantar |

=== CONCACAF Champions League ===
| July 27, 2011 Preliminary round leg 1 | Toronto FC (Canada) | 2–1 | (Nicaragua) Real Estelí | BMO Field |
| | Zavarise (yellow card) 46+'; Plata 56'; Plata 72'; Frings (yellow card) 75' | MLSsoccer.com | Ruiz (yellow card) 59'; López (yellow card) 71'; Calero 80' | Attendance: 9,241; Referee: Ricardo Salazar |

| August 2, 2011 Preliminary round leg 2 | Real Estelí (Nicaragua) | 1–2 | (Canada) Toronto FC | Estadio Independencia |
| | Rosas 46+' (pen.) | MLSsoccer.com | Johnson 37'; Johnson 47'; Frings (yellow card) 53'; Dunfield (yellow card) 61' | Attendance: 4,800; Referee: Raúl Castro |

| August 18, 2011 Group stage Matchday 1 | Tauro (Panama) | 1–2 | (Canada) Toronto FC | Estadio Rommel Fernández |
| | Moreno 76' (pen.); Moreno (yellow card) 82' | MLSsoccer.com | Iro (yellow card) 20'; Johnson 21' de Guzman 24'; Eckersley (yellow card) 32'; Stinson (yellow card) 46+'; Kočić (yellow card) 55'; Plata (yellow card) 81' de Guzman (yellow card) 91+' | Attendance: 1,905; Referee: Marcos Brea |

| August 25, 2011 Group stage Matchday 2 (Note: Game originally scheduled for August 24 but was cancelled at halftime, with Dallas up 1-0 on a goal by Jackson Gonçalves in the 18th, due to rain. Tournament regulations called for the game to be replayed from the start.) | Toronto FC (Canada) | 0–1 | (United States) FC Dallas | BMO Field |
| | Frings (yellow card) 38'; Eckersley (yellow card) 44' (yellow-red card) 90' | MLSsoccer.com | Benítez (yellow card) 31'; Stewart 46+'; Guarda (yellow card) 85'; Shea (yellow card) 88'; Castillo (yellow card) 93+' | Attendance: 500; Referee: Javier Santos |

| September 14, 2011 Group stage Matchday 3 | UNAM (Mexico) | 4–0 | (Canada) Toronto FC | Estadio Olímpico Universitario |
| | Bravo 17'; Velarde 21'; Bravo 33'; Bravo 42' | MLSsoccer.com | Soolsma (yellow card) 36' | Attendance: 3,382; Referee: Raymond Bogle |

| September 20, 2011 Group stage Matchday 4 | Toronto FC (Canada) | 1–0 | (Panama) Tauro | BMO Field |
| | Dunfield (yellow card) 37'; Koevermans 40'; Yourassowsky (yellow card) 80'; Stinson (yellow card) 93+' | MLSsoccer.com | Herrera (yellow card) 46'; Melo (yellow card) 67'; Rodríguez (yellow card) 69'; Gallardo (yellow card) 70' | Attendance: 10,132; Referee: Terry Vaughn |

| September 27, 2011 Group stage Matchday 5 | Toronto FC (Canada) | 1–1 | (Mexico) UNAM | BMO Field |
| | Stinson (yellow card) 21'; Marošević 35'; Morgan (yellow card) 93+' | MLSsoccer.com | Palacios 51'; Izazola (yellow card) 77' | Attendance: 9,115; Referee: Neal Brizan |

| October 18, 2011 Group stage Matchday 6 | FC Dallas (United States) | 0–3 | (Canada) Toronto FC | Pizza Hut Park |
| | Hernández (yellow card) 68'; Luna (yellow card) 91+' | MLSsoccer.com | Koevermans 29'; Iro (yellow card) 43'; Soolsma (yellow card) 58'; Plata 69' de Guzman (yellow card) 77'; Plata 81' | Attendance: 2,578; Referee: Roberto García |

Note

| Team | Pld | W | D | L | GF | GA | GD | Pts | Qualification | UNAM | TOR | DAL | TAU |
|---|---|---|---|---|---|---|---|---|---|---|---|---|---|
| (Mexico) UNAM | 6 | 3 | 2 | 1 | 8 | 2 | +6 | 11 | Advance to championship round | | 4–0 | 0–1 | 1–0 |
| (Canada) Toronto FC | 6 | 3 | 1 | 2 | 7 | 7 | 0 | 10 | Advance to championship round | 1–1 | | 0–1 | 1–0 |
| (United States) FC Dallas | 6 | 2 | 1 | 3 | 6 | 11 | −5 | 7 | | 0–2 | 0–3 | | 1–1 |
| (Panama) Tauro | 6 | 1 | 2 | 3 | 7 | 8 | −1 | 5 | | 0–0 | 1–2 | 5–3 | |

Legend: Blue = home team win; Yellow = draw; Red = away team win.

=== MLS Reserve League ===
| April 23, 2011 MLS Reserve Division | Toronto FC | 1–2 | Columbus Crew | BMO Field |
| | Jackman 35' | TorontoFC.ca | Mendoza 11'; Mendoza (red card) 43'; Davis 66'; Meram (yellow card) 87'; Davis (yellow card) 89' |

| May 29, 2011 MLS Reserve Division | Toronto FC | 0–0 | Philadelphia Union | Cherry Beach |
| | Henry (yellow card) 44' | TorontoFC.ca |

| June 21, 2011 MLS Reserve Division | Toronto FC | 2–3 | New England Revolution | BMO Field |
| | Murrell (yellow card) 8'; Omphroy 33'; Jackman (yellow card) 41'; Omphroy 59' | RevolutionSoccer.net | McCarthy (yellow card) 26'; Machado 39'; Loewy 56'; Guy 86' |

| August 7, 2011 MLS Reserve Division | D.C. United | 2–1 | Toronto FC | DCU Training Field |
| | Davies 58' (pen.); Burch 80' | DCUnited.com | Vukovic 77' |

| August 30, 2011 MLS Reserve Division | Toronto FC | 1–1 | D.C. United | Downsview Park |
| | Sturgis 41' (pen.) | TorontoFC.ca | da Luz (yellow card) 33'; Burch (yellow card) 36'; Barklage (yellow card) 86'; Ngwenya 92+' |

| September 2, 2011 MLS Reserve Division | New England Revolution | 2–1 | Toronto FC | Gillette Stadium |
| | Feilhaber (yellow card) 57'; Viator 67' (o.g.); Schilawski 91+' | TorontoFC.ca | Yourassowsky 74' | Referee: Guido Gonzalez |

| September 11, 2011 MLS Reserve Division | Columbus Crew | 4–2 | Toronto FC | Columbus Crew Stadium |
| | Meram 21'; Burns 34'; Cunningham 37'; Cunningham 41'; Rusmir (yellow card) 51' | TorontoFC.ca | Martina 32'; Viator (yellow card) 48'; Henry 85' | Referee: Ben Trevino |

| October 1, 2011 MLS Reserve Division | Toronto FC | 3–1 | New York Red Bulls | Downsview Park |
| | Makubuya 6'; Vukovic 10'; Vukovic 32'; Makubuya (yellow card) 45' | TorontoFC.ca | Kassel (yellow card) 27'; Nielsen (yellow card) 37'; Nikocevic 47'; Jones (yellow card) 58'; Rooney (yellow card) 88' |

| October 16, 2011 MLS Reserve Division | Philadelphia Union | 1–3 | Toronto FC | Union Training Fields |
| | Pfeffer 60'; Okugo (yellow card) 87' | TorontoFC.ca | Martina 27'; Richter 37' (o.g.); Cordon (yellow card) 62'; Richter 81' (o.g.) |

| TBA MLS Reserve Division | New York Red Bulls | – | Toronto FC | TBA |

== Squad statistics ==
=== Appearances and goals ===
| No. | Pos | Nat | Player | Total | | Major League Soccer | | Canadian Championship | | Champions League | |
| No. | Pos | Nat | Player | Apps | Goals | Apps | Goals | Apps | Goals | Apps | Goals |
|---|---|---|---|---|---|---|---|---|---|---|---|
| 2 | DF | (Panama) PAN | Demitrius Omphroy | 1 | 0 | 0+1 | 0 | 0+0 | 0 | 0+0 | 0 |
| 3 | DF | (England) ENG | Andy Iro | 20 | 0 | 13+0 | 0 | 0+0 | 0 | 7+0 | 0 |
| 4 | DF | (Canada) CAN | Doneil Henry | 17 | 0 | 6+4 | 0 | 0+1 | 0 | 4+2 | 0 |
| 5 | DF | (Canada) CAN | Ashtone Morgan | 22 | 0 | 9+5 | 0 | 0+0 | 0 | 5+3 | 0 |
| 6 | MF | (Canada) CAN | Julian de Guzman | 29 | 3 | 16+3 | 2 | 3+0 | 0 | 5+2 | 1 |
| 7 | FW | (Ecuador) ECU | Joao Plata | 35 | 8 | 21+5 | 3 | 4+0 | 1 | 4+1 | 4 |
| 8 | MF | (United States) USA | Eric Avila | 9 | 1 | 8+1 | 1 | 0+0 | 0 | 0+0 | 0 |
| 9 | FW | (Jamaica) JAM | Ryan Johnson | 20 | 6 | 12+0 | 3 | 0+0 | 0 | 8+0 | 3 |
| 11 | MF | (United States) USA | Nathan Sturgis | 16 | 0 | 11+3 | 0 | 1+0 | 0 | 0+1 | 0 |
| 12 | DF | (Canada) CAN | Adrian Cann | 14 | 0 | 12+0 | 0 | 2+0 | 0 | 0+0 | 0 |
| 13 | FW | (Canada) CAN | Keith Makubuya | 1 | 0 | 0+1 | 0 | 0+0 | 0 | 0+0 | 0 |
| 14 | FW | (Netherlands) NED | Danny Koevermans | 17 | 10 | 9+1 | 8 | 0+0 | 0 | 6+1 | 2 |
| 15 | MF | (Canada) CAN | Matt Stinson | 19 | 0 | 5+8 | 0 | 0+0 | 0 | 4+2 | 0 |
| 16 | MF | (Canada) CAN | Oscar Cordon | 6 | 0 | 1+3 | 0 | 1+1 | 0 | 0+0 | 0 |
| 17 | MF | (Netherlands) NED | Elbekay Bouchiba | 0 | 0 | 0+0 | 0 | 0+0 | 0 | 0+0 | 0 |
| 18 | FW | (Netherlands) NED | Nick Soolsma | 32 | 3 | 18+5 | 3 | 2+2 | 0 | 5+0 | 0 |
| 19 | DF | (Belgium) BEL | Mikael Yourassowsky | 26 | 1 | 13+8 | 0 | 3+0 | 1 | 0+2 | 0 |
| 20 | DF | (United States) USA | Ty Harden | 36 | 0 | 24+2 | 0 | 3+1 | 0 | 6+0 | 0 |
| 21 | MF | (France) FRA | Léandre Griffit | 1 | 0 | 0+0 | 0 | 0+0 | 0 | 0+1 | 0 |
| 22 | MF | (Germany) GER | Torsten Frings | 19 | 0 | 13+0 | 0 | 0+0 | 0 | 6+0 | 0 |
| 23 | MF | (Canada) CAN | Terry Dunfield | 10 | 0 | 2+4 | 0 | 0+0 | 0 | 2+2 | 0 |
| 24 | GK | (Switzerland) SUI | Stefan Frei | 31 | 0 | 27+0 | 0 | 4+0 | 0 | 0+0 | 0 |
| 25 | DF | (South Africa) RSA | Danleigh Borman | 29 | 0 | 18+4 | 0 | 3+0 | 0 | 4+0 | 0 |
| 26 | MF | (United States) USA | Matt Gold | 6 | 0 | 0+3 | 0 | 0+2 | 0 | 0+1 | 0 |
| 27 | DF | (England) ENG | Richard Eckersley | 33 | 0 | 22+1 | 0 | 4+0 | 0 | 6+0 | 0 |
| 28 | MF | (Canada) CAN | Gianluca Zavarise | 15 | 0 | 4+10 | 0 | 0+0 | 0 | 1+0 | 0 |
| 29 | DF | (United States) USA | Kyle Davies | 1 | 0 | 0+1 | 0 | 0+0 | 0 | 0+0 | 0 |
| 30 | GK | (Serbia) SRB | Miloš Kočić | 16 | 0 | 7+1 | 0 | 0+0 | 0 | 8+0 | 0 |
| 31 | DF | (Jamaica) JAM | Dicoy Williams | 10 | 0 | 7+1 | 0 | 2+0 | 0 | 0+0 | 0 |
| 33 | FW | (Curaçao) CUW | Javier Martina | 27 | 2 | 15+8 | 2 | 0+1 | 0 | 1+2 | 0 |
| 37 | FW | (Canada) CAN | Nicholas Lindsay | 0 | 0 | 0+0 | 0 | 0+0 | 0 | 0+0 | 0 |
| 55 | DF | (Guadeloupe) GLP | Eddy Viator | 4 | 0 | 2+1 | 0 | 0+0 | 0 | 0+1 | 0 |
| 70 | FW | (United States) USA | Peri Marošević | 14 | 3 | 4+3 | 2 | 0+0 | 0 | 5+2 | 1 |
| -- | MF | (Serbia) SRB | Alen Stevanović* | 12 | 0 | 9+3 | 0 | 0+0 | 0 | 0+0 | 0 |
| -- | MF | (Canada) CAN | Dwayne De Rosario* | 2 | 1 | 2+0 | 1 | 0+0 | 0 | 0+0 | 0 |
| -- | DF | (Canada) CAN | Nana Attakora* | 6 | 0 | 4+2 | 0 | 0+0 | 0 | 0+0 | 0 |
| -- | FW | (United States) USA | Alan Gordon* | 10 | 6 | 7+1 | 4 | 2+0 | 2 | 0+0 | 0 |
| -- | MF | (United States) USA | Jacob Peterson* | 16 | 0 | 13+0 | 0 | 2+1 | 0 | 0+0 | 0 |
| -- | MF | (Cameroon) CMR | Tony Tchani* | 17 | 1 | 13+0 | 1 | 3+1 | 0 | 0+0 | 0 |
| -- | DF | (United States) USA | Dan Gargan* | 19 | 0 | 12+4 | 0 | 2+1 | 0 | 0+0 | 0 |
| -- | FW | (Brazil) BRA | Maicon Santos* | 23 | 9 | 15+4 | 6 | 3+1 | 3 | 0+0 | 0 |
| -- | DF | (United States) USA | Dasan Robinson* | 1 | 0 | 0+0 | 0 | 0+0 | 0 | 0+1 | 0 |

Updated to match played October 22, 2011
Source: Toronto FC
* = Player is no longer with team

=== Top scorers ===
| Rank | Number | Name | Total | MLS | Canadian Championship | Champions League |
|---|---|---|---|---|---|---|
| 1 | 14 | (Netherlands) Danny Koevermans | 10 | 8 | 0 | 2 |
| 2 | ~ | (Brazil) Maicon Santos* | 9 | 6 | 3 | 0 |
| 3 | 7 | (Ecuador) Joao Plata | 8 | 3 | 1 | 4 |
| 4 | ~ | (United States) Alan Gordon* | 6 | 4 | 2 | 0 |
| 4 | 9 | (Jamaica) Ryan Johnson | 6 | 3 | 0 | 3 |
| 6 | 18 | (Netherlands) Nick Soolsma | 3 | 3 | 0 | 0 |
| 6 | 6 | (Canada) Julian de Guzman | 3 | 2 | 0 | 1 |
| 6 | 70 | (United States) Peri Marošević | 3 | 2 | 0 | 1 |
| 9 | 33 | (Curaçao) Javier Martina | 2 | 2 | 0 | 0 |
| 10 | 8 | (United States) Eric Avila | 1 | 1 | 0 | 0 |
| 10 | ~ | (Canada) Dwayne De Rosario* | 1 | 1 | 0 | 0 |
| 10 | ~ | (Cameroon) Tony Tchani* | 1 | 1 | 0 | 0 |
| 10 | 19 | (Belgium) Mikael Yourassowsky | 1 | 0 | 1 | 0 |

Updated to match played October 22, 2011
Source: Toronto FC
* = Player is no longer with team

=== Disciplinary record ===
Only players with at least one card included.

| Number | Position | Name | MLS Regular Season | | Canadian Championship | | Champions League | | Total | |
| Number | Position | Name | Yellow card | Red card | Yellow card | Red card | Yellow card | Red card | Yellow card | Red card |
|---|---|---|---|---|---|---|---|---|---|---|
| 3 | DF | Andy Iro | 3 | 0 | 0 | 0 | 2 | 0 | 5 | 0 |
| 4 | DF | Doneil Henry | 1 | 0 | 0 | 0 | 0 | 0 | 1 | 0 |
| 5 | DF | Ashtone Morgan | 1 | 0 | 0 | 0 | 1 | 0 | 2 | 0 |
| 6 | MF | Julian de Guzman | 6 | 0 | 0 | 0 | 2 | 0 | 8 | 0 |
| 7 | FW | Joao Plata | 1 | 0 | 0 | 0 | 1 | 0 | 2 | 0 |
| 8 | MF | Eric Avila | 1 | 0 | 0 | 0 | 0 | 0 | 1 | 0 |
| 11 | MF | Nathan Sturgis | 1 | 0 | 0 | 0 | 0 | 0 | 1 | 0 |
| 15 | MF | Matt Stinson | 1 | 0 | 0 | 0 | 3 | 0 | 4 | 0 |
| 16 | MF | Oscar Cordon | 1 | 0 | 0 | 0 | 0 | 0 | 1 | 0 |
| 18 | FW | Nick Soolsma | 1 | 0 | 0 | 0 | 2 | 0 | 3 | 0 |
| 19 | DF | Mikael Yourassowsky | 5 | 1 | 1 | 0 | 1 | 0 | 7 | 1 |
| 20 | DF | Ty Harden | 3 | 1 | 0 | 0 | 0 | 0 | 3 | 1 |
| 22 | MF | Torsten Frings | 0 | 0 | 0 | 0 | 3 | 0 | 3 | 0 |
| 23 | MF | Terry Dunfield | 0 | 0 | 0 | 0 | 2 | 0 | 2 | 0 |
| 25 | DF | Danleigh Borman | 4 | 0 | 0 | 0 | 0 | 0 | 4 | 0 |
| 27 | DF | Richard Eckersley | 6 | 0 | 0 | 0 | 3 | 1 | 9 | 1 |
| 28 | MF | Gianluca Zavarise | 2 | 1 | 0 | 0 | 1 | 0 | 3 | 1 |
| 30 | GK | Miloš Kočić | 0 | 0 | 0 | 0 | 1 | 0 | 1 | 0 |
| 31 | DF | Dicoy Williams | 1 | 0 | 1 | 0 | 0 | 0 | 2 | 0 |
| 33 | FW | Javier Martina | 3 | 0 | 1 | 0 | 0 | 0 | 4 | 0 |
| 55 | DF | Eddy Viator | 2 | 0 | 0 | 0 | 0 | 0 | 2 | 0 |
| -- | MF | Alen Stevanović* | 1 | 0 | 0 | 0 | 0 | 0 | 1 | 0 |
| -- | DF | Nana Attakora* | 1 | 0 | 0 | 0 | 0 | 0 | 1 | 0 |
| -- | MF | Jacob Peterson* | 1 | 0 | 0 | 0 | 0 | 0 | 1 | 0 |
| -- | FW | Alan Gordon* | 3 | 0 | 1 | 0 | 0 | 0 | 4 | 0 |
| -- | MF | Tony Tchani* | 4 | 1 | 0 | 0 | 0 | 0 | 4 | 1 |
| -- | DF | Dan Gargan* | 3 | 0 | 0 | 0 | 0 | 0 | 3 | 0 |
| -- | FW | Maicon Santos* | 0 | 0 | 1 | 0 | 0 | 0 | 1 | 0 |
| | | TOTALS | 56 | 4 | 5 | 0 | 22 | 1 | 83 | 5 |

* = Player is no longer with team

== Recognition ==
=== MLS Player of the Week ===
| Week | Player | Week's Statline |
|---|---|---|
| 8 | (Ecuador) Joao Plata | 1G (50'), Assist |
| 27 | (Netherlands) Danny Koevermans | 2G (52'), (60') |

=== MLS Goal of the Week ===
| Week | Player | Goal | Report |
|---|---|---|---|
| 2 | (Curaçao) Javier Martina | 70' | Martina GOTW |

=== MLS Save of the Week ===
| Week | Player | Save | Report |
|---|---|---|---|
| 9 | (Switzerland) Stefan Frei | 83' | Frei SOTW |
| 22 | (Serbia) Miloš Kočić | 92+' | Kočić SOTW |

=== MLS Team of the Week ===
| Week | Player/Manager | Position | Report |
|---|---|---|---|
| 2 | (Curaçao) Javier Martina | Forward | MLS Team of the Week: 2 |
| 4 | (South Africa) Danleigh Borman | Defender | MLS Team of the Week: 4 |
| 6 | (Canada) Julian de Guzman | Midfielder | MLS Team of the Week: 6 |
| 7 | (Switzerland) Stefan Frei | Goalkeeper | MLS Team of the Week: 7 |
| 8 | (Ecuador) Joao Plata | Forward | MLS Team of the Week: 8 |
| 10 | (Belgium) Mikael Yourassowsky | Midfielder | MLS Team of the Week: 10 |
| 10 | (Netherlands) Aron Winter | Manager | MLS Team of the Week: 10 |
| 20 | (Germany) Torsten Frings | Midfielder | MLS Team of the Week: 20 |
| 20 | (Netherlands) Aron Winter | Manager | MLS Team of the Week: 20 |
| 22 | (Serbia) Miloš Kočić | Goalkeeper | MLS Team of the Week: 22 |
| 22 | (Netherlands) Aron Winter | Manager | MLS Team of the Week: 22 |
| 27 | (Canada) Ashtone Morgan | Defender | MLS Team of the Week: 27 |
| 27 | (Netherlands) Danny Koevermans | Forward | MLS Team of the Week: 27 |
| 29 | (Serbia) Miloš Kočić | Goalkeeper | MLS Team of the Week: 29 |
| 29 | (Germany) Torsten Frings | Defender | MLS Team of the Week: 29 |
| 29 | (Canada) Ashtone Morgan | Defender | MLS Team of the Week: 29 |
| 32 | (Netherlands) Danny Koevermans | Forward | MLS Team of the Week: 32 |

== Miscellany ==
=== Allocation ranking ===
Toronto is in the #3 position in the MLS Allocation Ranking. The allocation ranking is the mechanism used to determine which MLS club has first priority to acquire a U.S. National Team player who signs with MLS after playing abroad, or a former MLS player who returns to the league after having gone to a club abroad for a transfer fee. A ranking can be traded, provided that part of the compensation received in return is another club's ranking.

=== International roster spots ===
It is believed that Toronto FC has 9 international roster spots. Each club in Major League Soccer is allocated 8 international roster spots, which can be traded. Toronto FC acquired an additional spot from San Jose Earthquakes on July 14, 2008. Toronto maintains this roster spot through the end of the 2013 season, at which point it reverts to San Jose. Toronto FC acquired another international roster spot from San Jose on July 14, 2011. TFC has use of this spot through the end of the 2012 season, at which point it reverts to San Jose. Toronto also traded a spot to FC Dallas on August 2, 2011, for the remainder of the 2011 season only.

There is no limit on the number of international slots on each club's roster. The remaining roster slots must belong to domestic players. For clubs based in Canada, a domestic player is either a player with the legal right to work in Canada (i.e., Canadian citizen, permanent resident, part of a protected class) or a U.S. citizen, a permanent U.S. resident (green card holder) or the holder of other special U.S. status (e.g., refugee or asylum status).

=== Future draft pick trades ===
Future picks acquired: 2012 SuperDraft Round 1 pick acquired from New York Red Bulls; 2012 SuperDraft Round 3 pick acquired from Colorado Rapids; 2013 Supplemental Draft Round 3 pick acquired from Colorado Rapids. Toronto also acquired undisclosed future considerations from Los Angeles Galaxy which may or may not include draft pick(s).
Future picks traded: 2012 SuperDraft Round 2 pick traded to Chicago Fire. Toronto has also traded future considerations to Vancouver Whitecaps FC which may or may not include draft pick(s).
