= Oscar Cordon =

Canadian soccer player (born 1993)

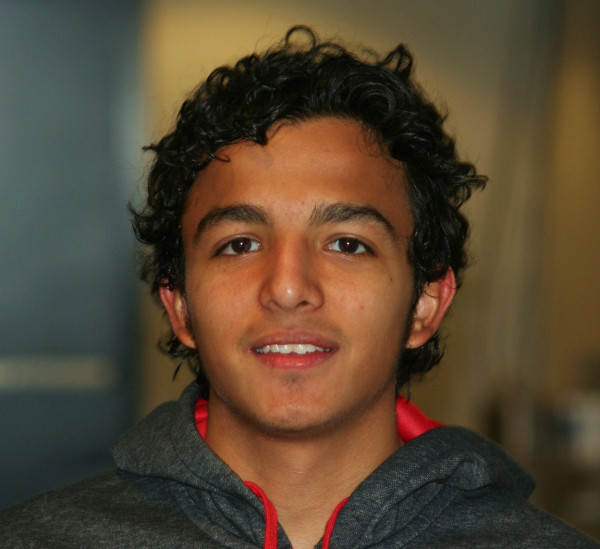
- Cordon in 2011

Personal information
- Full name: Oscar Eduardo Cordon Jr.
- Date of birth: January 18, 1993 (age 33)
- Place of birth: Toronto, Ontario, Canada
- Height: 5 ft 9 in (1.75 m)
- Position: Midfielder

Youth career
- Toronto Future Stars
- North York Hearts
- Erin Mills Eagles
- Brampton Youth SC
- 2008: Mississauga Falcons
- 2009–2010: Toronto FC

Senior career*
Years	Team	Apps	(Gls)
2009–2010	Toronto FC Senior Academy		
2010	→ Toronto FC (loan)	0	(0)
2011–2012	Toronto FC	4	(0)
2013	Brampton United	8	(0)
2014	Woodbridge Strikers	14	(3)
2015	Serbian White Eagles		
2015	Toronto Croatia		
2016–2018	Woodbridge Strikers	33	(5)
2018–2019	Croatia AC (indoor)		
Total		59+	(8+)
- * Club domestic league appearances and goals as of October 20, 2018

Oscar Eduardo Cordon (born January 18, 1993) is a Canadian former professional soccer player who played as a midfielder.

== Youth ==
Cordon began his youth career in the Driftwood Hispanic Soccer League with Toronto Future Stars. He later played youth rep soccer with the North York Hearts, Erin Mills Eagles, Brampton Youth SC, and the Mississauga Falcons. While playing rep soccer, Cordon also played for the Ontario provincial U-14, 15, and 16 programs. In 2009, after playing in a match for the Ontario U16s against the Toronto FC Academy, he caught the eye of then TFC Academy Director Stuart Neely, and joined the TFC Academy.

== Club career ==
In 2009, he joined TFC Academy and played for the team in the Canadian Soccer League. Cordon made two appearances with the Toronto FC first team during the 2010 season in non-MLS action, the first in June against Vancouver Whitecaps FC during the Nutrilite Canadian Championship and then in October against Arabe Unido during the CONCACAF Champions League group stage.

In late January 2011 it was announced that Cordon would travel with Toronto's first team to Turkey for preseason training camp, being one of four academy players invited to travel. After impressing during the preseason training camp he signed with Toronto FC on March 17, 2011.

Cordon made his MLS debut on April 13, 2011, in a 0–0 home draw against Los Angeles Galaxy as a second half sub for Gianluca Zavarise.

Cordon was released by Toronto on November 15, 2012.

In January, he went on trial with a club in Germany, but ultimately did not sign.

On July 18, 2013, Deportivo Iztapa announced they had signed Cordon. However, the two sides were unable to come to an agreement on a one-year contract, as they were awaiting his International Transfer Certificate, and Cordon returned to Toronto in September to complete his high school education. On September 1, 2003, he made his debut for Brampton United of the Canadian Soccer League against Astros Vasas FC. During his tenure with Brampton he helped the club secure a postseason berth by finishing fourth in the overall standings. He featured in the quarterfinals of the playoffs against SC Waterloo, but were eliminated by a score of 4-0.

Cordon joined the Woodbridge Strikers of the newly launched League1 Ontario in early 2014. Where he served as a player and a youth coach with the club. In 2015, he returned to the CSL to sign with the Serbian White Eagles. Midway through the season he was traded to arch-rivals Toronto Croatia and helped the club finish as runners-up during the regular season. In the postseason he featured in the CSL Championship finals match against Waterloo, and scored the lone goal to capture Toronto's tenth championship.

From 2016 to 2018, he returned to Woodbridge Strikers. In the winter of 2018-19, he played indoor soccer in the Mississauga-centered Arena Premier League with Croatia AC.

== International career ==
Cordon is eligible for Canada as well as Guatemala and Honduras through his parents, although he has stated that his goal is to play for the Canada national team.

Cordon was called up on five occasions by the Canadian under-18 and under-20 national teams for camps between 2010 and 2012, though he never made a competitive appearance for either.

In 2013, he was in talks to join the Guatemala U20 team. He obtained his Guatemalan passport, but did not join as he stated his objective was to join the Canadian team. In 2015, he attended a camp with the Guatemala U23 team.

== Coaching career ==
In 2023, he was named the under-15 and under-17 head coach of the York United FC Academy.

== Club statistics ==
Club	Season	League			Playoffs		Domestic cup		League cup		Continental		Total	
Club	Season	League	Apps	Goals	Apps	Goals	Apps	Goals	Apps	Goals	Apps	Goals	Apps	Goals
Toronto FC	2010	Major League Soccer	—		—		1	0	—		1	0	2	0
Toronto FC	2011	Major League Soccer	4	0	—		2	0	—		0	0	6	0
Toronto FC	2012	Major League Soccer	0	0	—		0	0	—		0	0	0	0
Brampton United	2013	Canadian Soccer League	?	?	1	0	—		—		—		?	?
Woodbridge Strikers	2014	League1 Ontario	14	3	—		—		4	0	—		18	3
Serbian White Eagles	2015	Canadian Soccer League	?	?	?	?	—		—		—		?	?
Toronto Croatia	2015	Canadian Soccer League	?	?	?	?	—		—		—		?	?
Woodbridge Strikers	2016	League1 Ontario	11	3	—		—		1+	0	—		12	3
Woodbridge Strikers	2017	League1 Ontario	19	2	1	0	—		?	0	—		20	2
Woodbridge Strikers	2018	League1 Ontario	3	0	2	0	—		0	0	—		5	0
Career total			51+	8+	4+	0	3	0	5+	0	1	0	64+	8+

== Honours ==
Toronto FC

- Canadian Championship: 2010, 2011, 2012

Toronto Croatia

- CSL Championship: 2015
