= Keith Makubuya =

Canadian soccer player (born 1993)

Personal information
- Full name: Keith Makubuya
- Date of birth: January 26, 1993 (age 33)
- Place of birth: St. Catharines, Ontario, Canada
- Height: 5 ft 11 in (1.80 m)
- Position: Forward

Youth career
- 2008: St. Catharines Concord
- 2009–2010: Toronto FC

Senior career*
Years	Team	Apps	(Gls)
2011–2012	Toronto FC	2	(0)
2013–2015	Niagara United	9	(2)
- * Club domestic league appearances and goals as of August 15, 2012 ‡ National team caps and goals as of January 30, 2011

Keith Makubuya (born January 26, 1993) is a Canadian soccer player who played in Major League Soccer and the Canadian Soccer League.

== Career ==
=== Youth ===
Makubuya began his youth career with St. Catharines Concord SC. He continued his youth career with North Mississauga SC.

=== Professional ===
In 2009 Makubuya joined TFC Academy and played for the Academy team in the Canadian Soccer League. In late January 2011 it was announced that Makubuya would travel with Toronto's Senior team to Turkey for preseason training camp, Makubuya was one of four academy players invited to travel. After impressing during the preseason training camp he signed with Toronto FC on March 17, 2011.

Makubuya made his debut for Toronto's first team against the Vancouver Whitecaps on March 19, 2011 as a second half sub for Nick Soolsma. The game ended as a 4–2 away defeat for Toronto in the league's first ever all Canadian match-up.

Makubuya was released by Toronto on November 15, 2012. Makubuya signed for Niagara United for the 2013 CSL season. He scored two goals in the 2014 season opener. He played with the Niagara organization for three seasons failing to secure a postseason berth.

== Honours ==
=== Toronto FC ===
- Canadian Championship (2): 2011, 2012

== Club statistics ==
Club	Nat	Season	League	League		Playoff		Domestic Cup		Continental		Total	
Club	Nat	Season	League	Apps	Goals	Apps	Goals	Apps	Goals	Apps	Goals	Apps	Goals
Toronto FC	(Canada)	2011	MLS	1	0	-		-		-		1	0
Toronto FC	(Canada)	2012	MLS	1	0	-		-		-		1	0
Career total				2	0	0	0	0	0	0	0	2	0

Last updated on August 15, 2011.
