= Mikael Yourassowsky =

Belgian footballer

Personal information
- Full name: Mikael-David Youri Yourassowsky
- Date of birth: 26 February 1983 (age 43)
- Place of birth: Brussels, Belgium
- Height: 1.79 m (5 ft 10 1/2 in)
- Position: Defender

Youth career
- 1999–2001: Anderlecht

Senior career*
Years	Team	Apps	(Gls)
2001–2003	Anderlecht	0	(0)
2003–2004	Genk	0	(0)
2004–2005	Boca Juniors	2	(0)
2005–2006	Pontevedra	0	(0)
2006–2007	Kerkyra		
2007	Ethnikos Piraeus	6	(1)
2007–2009	Skoda Xanthi	5	(0)
2009	Atlético Mexiquense	11	(0)
2009–2010	Rijeka	14	(0)
2011–2012	Toronto FC	21	(0)
2015	Dender EH	4	(0)

International career
1997–1999	Belgium U16	7	(1)
1999	Belgium U17	3	(0)
- * Club domestic league appearances and goals as of 22 December 2015

Mikael-David Youri Yourassowsky (born 26 February 1983 in Ixelles) is a Belgian footballer who last played for Dender EH in the Belgian Third Division.

== Club career ==
Yourassowsky began his career in the youth ranks of top Belgian club Anderlecht. In 2001, he went on trial for four months with top Spanish side Barcelona. He returned to Anderlecht and in 2003 joined Genk. After impressing in Belgium, Yourassowsky joined top Argentinian side Boca Juniors. He was promoted to the first team by Carlos Bianchi and made his first division debut in June 2004 in a starting role in a 0–0 draw versus Colón de Santa Fe. As a result of injuries and a managerial change his opportunities with Boca diminished.

In August 2005 he would return to Europe and join Pontevedra in Spain. The following season Yourassowsky moved to Greece joining Kerkyra and the left back was assigned the number 3 shirt. With Kerkyra he scored his first professional goal. The following season, he joined Greek side Ethnikos Asteras and appeared in 6 league matches scoring 1 goal. He joined Skoda Xanthi in mid-season and remained there through the 2009 season.

After a few years in Greece, his globe trotting career would take him to Mexico's Primera División A as he joined Atlético Mexiquense in 2009. In his one year in Mexico Yourassowsky made 11 league appearances with his club. The following season Yourassowsky returned to Europe by signing with Croatian side NK Rijeka. While with NK Rijeka he appeared in 14 league matches.

He signed with Toronto FC on 18 March 2011 following a successful trial. Yourassowsky made his debut for the team as a second half sub on 19 March 2011 against Vancouver Whitecaps. One week later Yourassowsky made his first start for the team against Portland Timbers in which he received two yellow cards resulting in a red card in the 84th minute, the game ended as a 2–0 home victory for Toronto with both goals coming from Javier Martina. Yourassowsky scored his first goal for Toronto on 2 July in a 2–1 win over Vancouver Whitecaps FC in the Canadian Championship, leading the team to its third consecutive Canadian title.

Yourassowsky was waived by Toronto FC on 19 January 2012.

In January 2015, he signed a contract until the end of the season with Dender EH.

== Personal life ==
Yourassowsky is of Russian descent through a great-grandfather, and Congolese descent through a grandmother.

== Honours ==
=== Toronto FC ===
- Canadian Championship (1): 2011
