= Matt Stinson =

Canadian soccer player (born 1992)

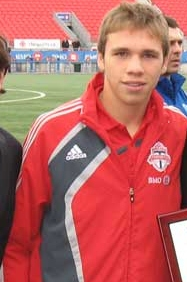
- Stinson in 2009

Personal information
- Full name: Matthew Garrett Stinson
- Date of birth: September 9, 1992 (age 34)
- Place of birth: Toronto, Ontario, Canada
- Height: 5 ft 10 in (1.78 m)
- Position: Midfielder

Youth career
- 1997–1998: Armour Heights SC
- 1999–2006: North York Hearts
- 2007: Clarkson Comets SC
- 2008–2010: Toronto FC

College career
Years	Team	Apps	(Gls)
2010	Winthrop Eagles	18	(3)
2013–2015	York Lions	31	(9)

Senior career*
Years	Team	Apps	(Gls)
2011–2013	Toronto FC	17	(0)
2014–2016	Vaughan Azzurri		

International career
2010–2011	Canada U20	4	(0)
2012	Canada U23	4	(0)
2013	Canada	1	(0)

Managerial career
- 2015–: York Lions (assistant)
- * Club domestic league appearances and goals

Matthew Garrett "Matt" Stinson (born September 9, 1992) is a Canadian former professional soccer player who played as a midfielder. He is an assistant coach for his alma mater, the York Lions.

== Club career ==
=== Youth ===
Born in Toronto, Ontario, Stinson began his youth career in the age of five with the Armour Heights Soccer AssociationClub, before joined two years in the age of nine to North York Hearts SC. He played until December 2006 with the Hearts Soccer Club, before played for Clarkson Comets SC in Mississauga, Ontario. In 2008, aged 16, he joined TFC Academy for the youth sides inaugural season in the Canadian Soccer League. Stinson quickly progressed in the academy and eventually was named captain of the academy team. In 2010, he left the academy to attend Winthrop University in South Carolina. While at Winthrop, Stinson was named the Team MVP and earned All-Big South Conference Second Team honours.

=== Professional ===
In late January 2011 it was announced that Stinson would travel with Toronto's Senior team to Turkey for preseason training camp, Stinson was one of four academy players invited to travel. On February 16, 2011, Stinson scored the game's only goal to lift Toronto FC to a 1–0 victory over Red Star Belgrade during the club's preseason. After impressing during the preseason training camp he signed with Toronto FC on March 17, 2011. Stinson made his professional debut on June 25, 2011, as a second half sub for Javier Martina in a 3–1 away loss to Real Salt Lake.

Stinson was released by Toronto FC on March 19, 2013 and trained with Armour Heights S.C., before returned for his studies to the York University. He played his first match in his comeback for the York Lions on September 30, 2013, against the Brock University men soccer Team Badgers. Stinson was a student of York University from September 2011.

== International career ==
Stinson has represented Canada at various youth levels. In 2010, he represented Canada at the Under-20 level.

On November 3, 2011, Stinson was called up to the Canadian senior team for Canada's final two matches of 2014 CONCACAF second round world cup qualification vs. Saint Kitts and Nevis Three days later Stinson was removed from the line-up due to injury, Nana Attakora was brought in to replace him in the 18-man squad. Stinson made his senior team debut January 29, 2013 in an international friendly against United States. He came on as a second half sub for Terry Dunfield, as the game ended in a 0–0 draw.

== Career statistics ==
As of September 13, 2012

Appearances and goals by club, season and competition
Club	Season	League			Playoff		National cup		Continental		Total	
Club	Season	Division	Apps	Goals	Apps	Goals	Apps	Goals	Apps	Goals	Apps	Goals
Toronto FC	2011	MLS	13	0	–		–		6	0	19	0
Toronto FC	2012	MLS	4	0	–		–		2	0	6	0
Career total			17	0	0	0	0	0	8	0	25	0

== Honours ==
Toronto FC

- Canadian Championship: 2011, 2012
