= Peri Marošević =

American soccer player (born 1989)

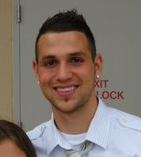
- Marošević in 2010

Personal information
- Full name: Perica Marošević
- Date of birth: May 5, 1989 (age 37)
- Place of birth: Brčko, SFR Yugoslavia
- Height: 5 ft 9 in (1.75 m)
- Position: Forward

Youth career
- 2004–2006: IMG Soccer Academy

College career
Years	Team	Apps	(Gls)
2006–2008	Michigan Wolverines		

Senior career*
Years	Team	Apps	(Gls)
2007–2008	Chicago Fire Premier	11	(4)
2009–2011	FC Dallas	4	(0)
2010	→ Austin Aztex (loan)	3	(0)
2011	Toronto FC	7	(2)
2012–2013	Junak Sinj	4	(0)
2013–2014	New York Cosmos	8	(2)
2015	Michigan Bucks	2	(0)
Total		39	(8)

International career
2008–2009	United States U20	14	(5)
Medal record
Representing United States
Runner-up	CONCACAF U-20 Championship	2009
- * Club domestic league appearances and goals as of December 16, 2015

Perica "Peri" Marošević (born May 5, 1989) is an American former soccer player.

== Early life ==
Marošević was born to a Croat father and a Serb mother in Bosnia in Yugoslavia prior to the Bosnian War, and initially moved to Frankfurt, Germany with his parents as a young child to escape the conflict, before eventually settling in Rockford, Illinois.

== Career ==
=== Youth and college ===
Marošević attended Guilford High School in Rockford, IL and Edison High School in Bradenton, FL, played club soccer with the Rockford Raptors and Chicago Sockers, and played college soccer at the University of Michigan, where he was named to the CoSida Academic All-District First Team in 2007, was a two-time All-Big Ten Second Team nominee and a one-time All-Big Ten First Team nominee, scoring 24 goals and registering seven assists becoming the team's leading scorer 2 out of his 3 seasons. During his college years he also played with Chicago Fire Premier in the USL Premier Development League.

=== Professional ===
Marošević was drafted in the first round (fifth overall) by FC Dallas in the 2009 MLS SuperDraft, and signed to a Generation Adidas contract. He made his professional debut on March 29, 2009, in a Dallas's game against Chivas USA. In April 2009, Peri appeared alongside 14 other Major League Soccer Players on Cosmogirl.com's "Hottest Soccer Guys".

In June 2010, having found it increasingly difficult to break into the FC Dallas first team, Marošević was loaned to USSF-D2 side Austin Aztex. He made his debut for the Aztex on June 19, coming on as a substitute against Miami FC. Marošević scored a hat-trick for the Aztex in a second round Lamar Hunt U.S. Open Cup game against Arizona Sahuaros on June 22, 2010. The young striker ended his month-long loan deal tallying four goals in four games.

Marošević was signed by Toronto FC on July 28, 2011, after asking to be released from FC Dallas. Two days later Marošević made his debut for Toronto as a second half sub for Nick Soolsma against Portland Timbers, with Toronto down 2–0. Marosevic ignited a comeback by scoring on his debut in the 63rd minute followed by a Danny Koevermans strike, earning a well-fought 2–2 away draw for Toronto FC. In Toronto's next league match against DC United, Peri again came in the game as a second-half substitute earning his second league goal in only two league appearances for Toronto FC. The game ended in a 3–3 draw. Marošević made his mark on the Reds season once again scoring against UNAM Pumas in the CONCACAF Champions League group stage, the game ended in a 1–1 home draw to the Mexican side.

Marošević declined a contract offer by Toronto FC in January 2012. In October 2012, he signed with NK Junak Sinj of the Croatian second division.

On February 21, 2013, Marošević signed to play for New York Cosmos in the team's inaugural NASL season. He scored in the 44th minute against the Fort Lauderdale Strikers in his first appearance for the Cosmos, the club's first goal in 30 years. The club went on to win Soccer Bowl 2013.

In July 2014, the New York Cosmos cut ties with Marošević.

In 2015, Marošević appeared for the Michigan Bucks of the Premier Development League, scoring in a 3–0 win over Detroit City FC in the first round of the 2015 U.S. Open Cup.

=== International ===
Marošević has been a member of the U.S. U-17, U-18, and U-20 national teams. He was a member of the squad for the United States in the 2009 U-20 FIFA World Cup, coming on as a substitute at halftime in a 3–0 loss to Korea.
