= Tony Tchani =

Cameroonian footballer (born 1989)

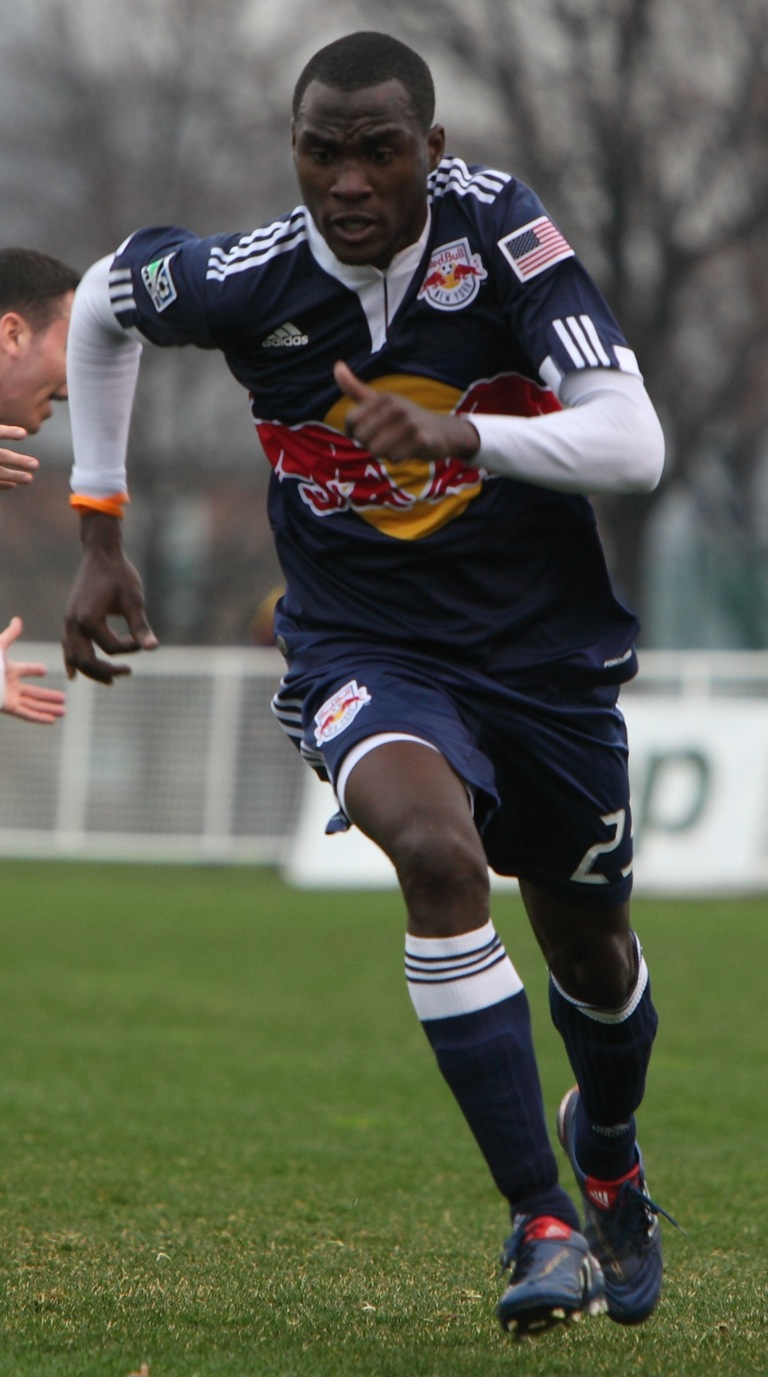
- Tchani playing for New York Red Bulls in 2010

Personal information
- Full name: Tony Ghislain Tchani
- Date of birth: 13 April 1989 (age 37)
- Place of birth: Douala, Cameroon
- Height: 1.93 m (6 ft 4 in)
- Position: Midfielder

Youth career
- 2004–2008: Beach FC

College career
Years	Team	Apps	(Gls)
2008–2009	Virginia Cavaliers	37	(17)

Senior career*
Years	Team	Apps	(Gls)
2008	Hampton Roads Piranhas	1	(0)
2010–2011	New York Red Bulls	29	(1)
2011	Toronto FC	13	(1)
2011–2017	Columbus Crew SC	130	(8)
2017	Vancouver Whitecaps FC	27	(4)
2018	Chicago Fire	13	(1)
2019	FC Edmonton	5	(0)
2021	FC Motown		
2021	Maryland Bobcats	2	(0)

International career^{‡}
2016	United States	1	(0)
2016	Cameroon	2	(0)
- * Club domestic league appearances and goals as of 3 April2024 ‡ National team caps and goals as of 7 September 2016

Tony Ghislain Tchani (/ˈtʃɑːni/; born 13 April 1989) is a Cameroonian retired footballer who played as a midfielder.

== Youth and college soccer ==
Tchani moved to the United States from his native Cameroon in 2004, settling in Norfolk, Virginia. He attended Maury High School, and played club soccer for Beach FC before playing college soccer at the University of Virginia. He started 12 matches and scored 9 goals as a freshman, was the 2008 ACC Freshman of the Year, a second team all-ACC selection, was named to the first team All-South Atlantic Region by the National Soccer Coaches Association of America (NSCAA), and was a Soccer America first team All-Freshmen. During the 2009 season, Tchani was named First-Team All America by College Soccer News, a member of the NCAA College Cup All-Tournament team, First Team All-America by NSCAA, and a second team All-ACC member. In 2009, the UVa Men's Soccer team won the National Championship (a 3–2 penalty kick shootout against Akron), with Tchani scoring one of Virginia's penalty kicks.

During his college years he also played with the Hampton Roads Piranhas in the USL Premier Development League.

== Club career ==
=== New York Red Bulls ===
Tchani was drafted in the first round (2nd overall) of the 2010 MLS SuperDraft by New York Red Bulls. He made his professional debut on 27 March 2010, in New York's opening game of the 2010 MLS season against Chicago Fire. On 27 April 2010 Tchani made his first start for New York helping the club to a 2–1 victory over Philadelphia Union in a 2010 Lamar Hunt U.S. Open Cup qualification match. On 20 May 2010 Tchani headed in his first career goal in a 3–1 loss to Columbus Crew. During Tchani's initial campaign with New York he was gradually brought into the first unit by coach Hans Backe and eventually began to form a solid partnership in the heart of the Red Bulls' midfield with newly signed Rafael Marquez. Tchani ended his first professional season appearing in 27 regular season matches for New York scoring 1 goal and providing 3 assists in helping his side capture the regular season Eastern Conference title.

=== Toronto FC ===
Tchani was traded to Toronto FC on 1 April 2011 along with teammate Danleigh Borman and a 2012 SuperDraft 1st round pick for Dwayne De Rosario. The following day Tchani made his debut for Toronto in a 1–1 home draw against Chivas USA. Tchani scored his first goal for Toronto in a 1–1 home draw versus Columbus Crew on 23 April 2011, following his goal celebration he was shown his second yellow of the game leading to an ejection. Tchani was forced to change his number in late June from 22 to 32 with Toronto's new designated player signing of Torsten Frings.

=== Columbus Crew ===
On 15 July 2011, Tchani was traded to Columbus Crew in exchange for Andy Iro and Léandre Griffit. Due to a left knee injury, Tchani was sidelined upon his arrival at the club, and underwent surgery in late August. Finally, on 27 October 2011, he made his debut for the Black & Gold, playing 90 minutes in the midfield in a 1–0 away defeat at the hands of the Colorado Rapids in the Wild Card round of the 2011 MLS Cup Playoffs.

On 7 December 2012 Tchani signed a new deal with Columbus. In 2013, Tchani remained a part-time player starting 13 matches for Columbus. However, in 2014 he became a mainstay and started 33 of 34 league matches. In 2016, he missed time because of national team commitments, but still made 21 appearances, scoring against Orlando City SC in a 2–2 draw.

=== Vancouver Whitecaps FC ===
In a deal announced 30 March 2017, Tchani, along with $300,000 in various allocation funds and a possible future draft pick, was traded to Vancouver Whitecaps FC for Kekuta Manneh.

=== Chicago Fire ===
On 28 February 2018, Tchani was traded to the Chicago Fire for $150,000 in Targeted Allocation Money. He was waived by the Fire on 9 August 2018.

=== Later career ===
On 7 August 2019, Tchani signed with Canadian Premier League side FC Edmonton. He made his debut on August 10 against Pacific FC. On November 4 Edmonton announced Tchani would not return to the club for the 2020 season.

On 30 July 2021, Tchani signed with NISA side Maryland Bobcats.

== International career ==
On 4 November 2015, Tchani received his first call up from Cameroon for their upcoming World Cup Qualifying matches against Niger. However, after aggravating an injury during a match with Columbus, he withdrew from the squad.

In January 2016, Tchani was called up by the United States for their friendlies against Iceland and Canada He made his U.S. debut on 31 January against Iceland, coming on as a substitute in the 70th minute. However, this friendly appearance did not cap-tie Tchani.

In March 2016 he accepted a call up from Cameroon for their 2017 Africa Cup of Nations qualifier against South Africa. After appearing against South Africa, he was cap-tied to Cameroon.

== Personal life ==
Tchani received U.S. citizenship in 2013.

== Career statistics ==
As of 5 November 2019

Club	Season	League			Playoffs (Note: Includes appearances in the MLS Cup Playoffs)		Cup (Note: Includes appearances in the U.S. Open Cup and Canadian Championship)		Continental		Total	
Club	Season	Division	Apps	Goals	Apps	Goals	Apps	Goals	Apps	Goals	Apps	Goals
Hampton Roads Piranhas	2008	PDL	1	0	–		–		–		1	0
New York Red Bulls	2010	Major League Soccer	27	1	0	0	3	0	–		30	1
New York Red Bulls	2011	Major League Soccer	2	0	0	0	0	0	–		2	0
New York Red Bulls	Total		29	1	0	0	3	0	0	0	32	1
Toronto FC	2011	Major League Soccer	13	1	–		4	0	0	0	17	1
Columbus Crew SC	2011	Major League Soccer	0	0	1	0	0	0	0	0	1	0
Columbus Crew SC	2012	Major League Soccer	22	2	–		0	0	–		22	2
Columbus Crew SC	2013	Major League Soccer	22	0	–		1	0	–		23	0
Columbus Crew SC	2014	Major League Soccer	33	0	2	1	2	0	–		37	1
Columbus Crew SC	2015	Major League Soccer	32	5	5	0	2	0	–		39	5
Columbus Crew SC	2016	Major League Soccer	21	1	–		2	0	–		23	1
Columbus Crew SC	2017	Major League Soccer	0	0	0	0	0	0	–		0	0
Columbus Crew SC	Total		130	8	8	1	7	0	0	0	145	9
Vancouver Whitecaps FC	2017	Major League Soccer	27	4	2	0	0	0	1	0	30	4
Chicago Fire	2018	Major League Soccer	13	1	–		3	0	–		16	1
FC Edmonton	2019	Canadian Premier League	5	0	0	0	0	0	–		5	0
Total			218	15	10	1	17	0	1	0	246	16

== Honours ==
University of Virginia

- NCAA Men's Division I Soccer Championship: 2009

Toronto FC

- Canadian Championship: 2011
