= Dasan Robinson =

American soccer player

Personal information
- Full name: Dasan Alexander Robinson
- Date of birth: June 6, 1984 (age 42)
- Place of birth: Evanston, Illinois, United States
- Height: 5 ft 11 in (1.80 m)
- Position: Defender

Youth career
- 2002–2005: Dayton Flyers

Senior career*
Years	Team	Apps	(Gls)
2004–2005	Chicago Fire Premier	29	(0)
2006–2011	Chicago Fire	85	(3)
2011	Toronto FC	0	(0)
2011	Los Angeles Galaxy	1	(0)
Total		115	(3)
- * Club domestic league appearances and goals as of October, 2011

Dasan Alexander Robinson (born June 6, 1984) is an American former soccer player.

== Career ==
=== College and amateur ===
Robinson grew up in the Cleveland area and graduated from Elyria High School. He played college soccer at the University of Dayton for four years, where he finished with 6 goals and 13 assists in 68 matches, and spent three seasons with Chicago Fire Premier in the USL Premier Development League.

=== Professional ===
Robinson was drafted in the second round, 22nd overall, by Chicago Fire in the 2006 MLS Supplemental Draft and played for Chicago into the 2011 MLS season.

He was traded to Toronto FC on July 28, 2011, for Dan Gargan and a second-round 2012 MLS SuperDraft pick. Robinson made his debut for Toronto on August 18 in the CONCACAF Champions League group stage against Tauro F.C., a 2–1 away victory for TFC.

Robinson's stay in Toronto lasted less than two months as he was traded to Los Angeles Galaxy on September 15, 2011, in exchange for Kyle Davies. At season's end, Los Angeles declined his 2012 contract option and he entered the 2011 MLS Re-Entry Draft. After no other club selected him, Los Angeles exercised its option to retain his MLS rights.

On January 27, 2012, Robinson announced his retirement via his Twitter account.

=== Coaching ===
Robinson is currently involved in coaching in the Chicago area through the private coaching service, CoachUp.

== Honors ==
=== Los Angeles Galaxy ===
- Major League Soccer- MLS Cup (1): 2011
- Major League Soccer- Western Conference Championship (1): 2011
- Major League Soccer - Supporters' Shield (1): 2011

=== Chicago Fire ===
- Major League Soccer- Lamar Hunt U.S. Open Cup (1): 2006
