= Danleigh Borman =

South African soccer player

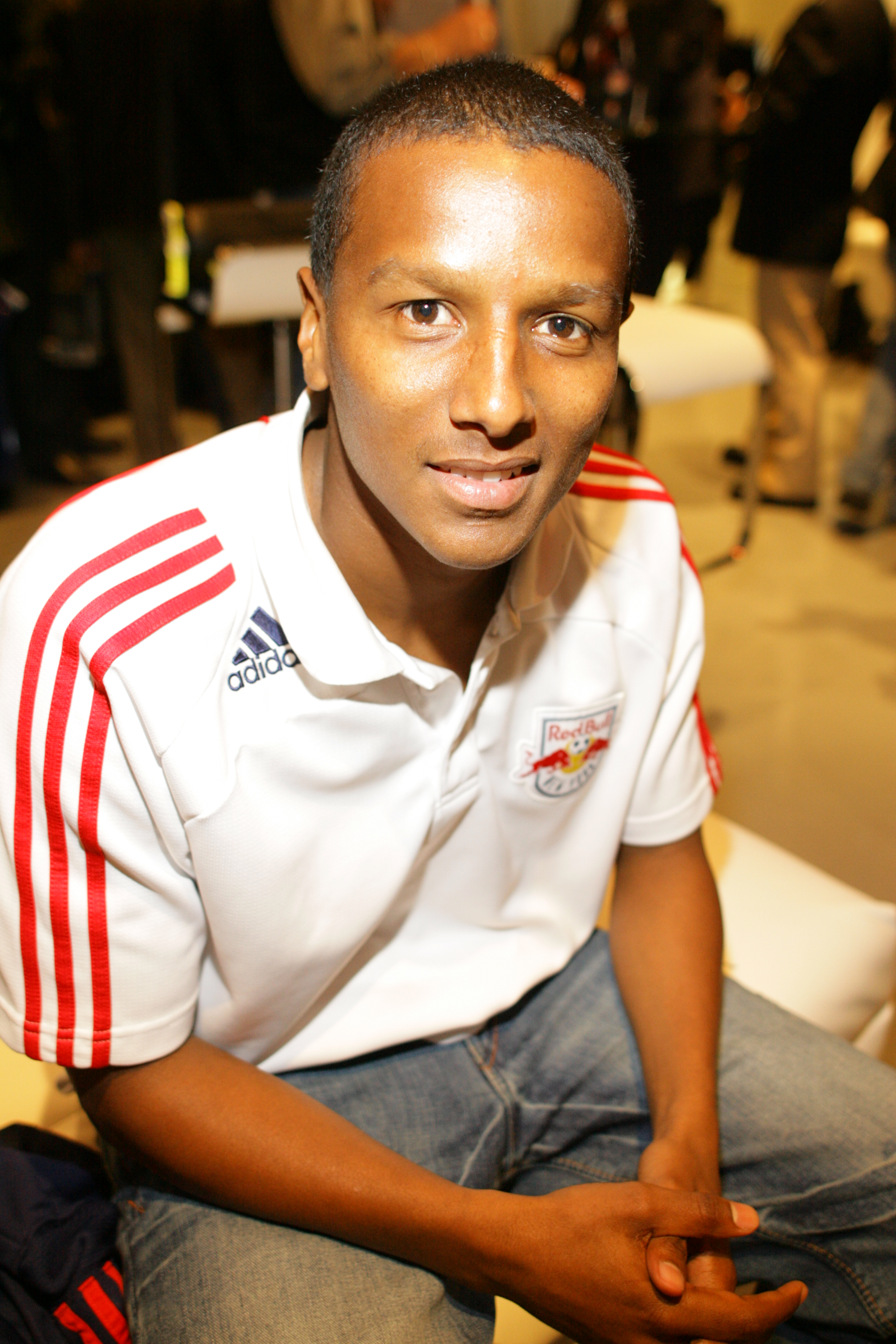

Personal information
- Full name: Danleigh Borman
- Date of birth: 27 January 1985 (age 41)
- Place of birth: Cape Town, South Africa
- Height: 5 ft 9 in (1.75 m)
- Positions: Left back; left winger

Youth career
- –2004: Santos
- 2004–2007: Rhode Island Rams

Senior career*
Years	Team	Apps	(Gls)
2006–2007	Rhode Island Stingrays	20	(7)
2008–2011	New York Red Bulls	59	(4)
2011	Toronto FC	22	(0)
2012–2013	SuperSport United	6	(0)
2013	Mpumalanga Black Aces	2	(0)
2014–2015	Vasco da Gama	8	(0)

International career
2004	South Africa U-20		
- * Club domestic league appearances and goals as of 14 April 2014

Danleigh Borman (born 27 January 1985) is a South African soccer player who plays as a defender.

== Career ==
=== College and amateur ===
Borman began his career in the youth system of South African Premier Soccer League side Santos, before moving to the United States in 2004 to play college soccer at the University of Rhode Island. He was named A-10 Rookie of the Year in 2004, finishing with two goals and five assists. He earned the A-10 Championship Most Outstanding Player Award after helping the Rams secure a 2–0 win over Saint Louis University in the 2006 Championship Game. In 2007, he was selected to the Atlantic 10 All-Conference Second Team after finishing his senior season with one goal and seven assists. Over his four seasons with Rhode Island, Borman totaled seven goals and 16 assists in 83 games.

During the 2006 and 2007 season Borman also played for the Rhode Island Stingrays in the USL Premier Development League. In 2006, he led the Stingrays with seven goals, including a hat-trick in a 6–0 victory over the Vermont Voltage on 2 July 2006.

=== Professional ===
Borman was drafted with the 7th overall pick in the 2008 MLS Supplemental Draft by New York Red Bulls. He made his professional debut on 5 April 2008, coming on as a half time substitute against Columbus Crew. He scored his first Major League Soccer goal against the Los Angeles Galaxy on 10 May 2008, and ended his first season in MLS appearing in 15 matches and scoring two goals. In 2009 Borman saw action in both midfield and as a left back. He ended the season as the club's starting left back, appearing in 24 league matches and scoring one goal. At the conclusion of the MLS season, Borman went on a training stint with Argentine side Gimnasia La Plata.

Borman was traded to Toronto FC on 1 April 2011 along with teammate Tony Tchani and a 2012 SuperDraft 1st round draft pick for Dwayne De Rosario. The following day Borman made his debut for Toronto in a 1–1 home draw against Chivas USA.

After the 2011 season, Toronto and Borman could not agree terms and Borman opted to participate in the 2011 MLS Re-Entry Draft. He was selected by New England Revolution in Stage 1 of the draft on 5 December 2011. New England and Borman never came to terms though, and he subsequently signed for ABSA Premiership side SuperSport United. Borman was released by SuperSport United at the end of the 2012-13 Premier Soccer League season.

He joined Mpumalanga Black Aces in September 2013 on a 1-year deal.

Borman signed with Vasco da Gama (South Africa) in August 2014.

=== International ===
Borman has represented South Africa at the U-20 level, initially being called up at the age of seventeen.

== Honours ==
=== New York Red Bulls ===
- Major League Soccer Eastern Conference Championship: 2008

=== Toronto FC ===
- Canadian Championship: 2011

=== SuperSport United ===
- Nedbank Cup: 2012

== Career statistics ==
Updated 6 July 2010

All-time MLS club performance
Club	Season	Major League Soccer		Domestic Cup^{1}		MLS Playoffs		CONCACAF		Total
Club	Season	App	Goals	App	Goals	App	Goals	App	Goals	App	Goals
New York Red Bulls	2008	15	2	1	0	0	0	-	-	16	2
New York Red Bulls	2009	24	1	2	0	-	-	2	0	28	1
New York Red Bulls	2010	18	1	3	0	0	0	-	-	21	1
New York Red Bulls	2011	2	0	-	-	-	-	-	-	2	0
Toronto FC	2011	22	0	4	0	-	-	5	0	31	0
Total		81	4	10	0	–	–	7	0	98	4

Last Update: 1 October 2011

^{1}Lamar Hunt U.S. Open Cup/Nutrilite Canadian Cup
