= Dan Gargan =

American soccer player (born 1982)

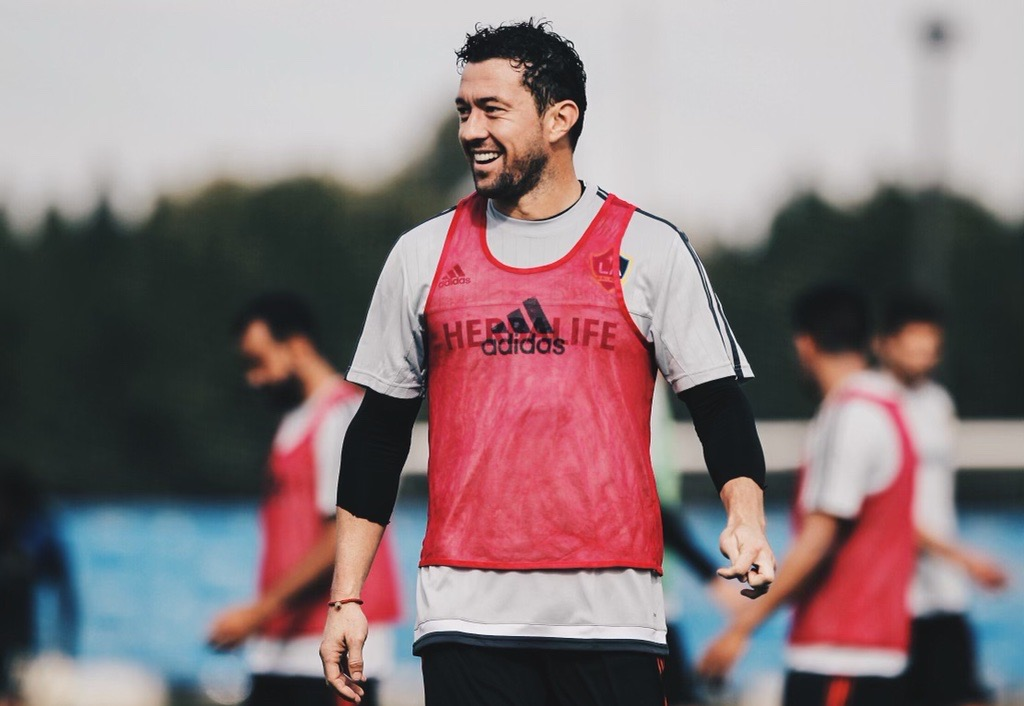

Personal information
- Full name: Daniel Charles Gargan
- Date of birth: December 14, 1982 (age 43)
- Place of birth: Philadelphia, Pennsylvania, United States
- Height: 5 ft 11 in (1.80 m)
- Position: Defender

College career
Years	Team	Apps	(Gls)
2001–2004	Georgetown Hoyas		

Senior career*
Years	Team	Apps	(Gls)
2004	Chesapeake Dragons	2	(0)
2005–2008	Colorado Rapids	49	(0)
2008	Chivas USA	0	(0)
2009	Puerto Rico Islanders	12	(1)
2010–2011	Toronto FC	43	(1)
2011–2012	Chicago Fire	31	(1)
2013	San Jose Earthquakes	8	(0)
2014–2015	LA Galaxy	53	(0)
- * Club domestic league appearances and goals as of February 29, 2016

Dan Gargan (born December 14, 1982) is an American former professional soccer player who last played for LA Galaxy in Major League Soccer. He is the former color commentator for Atlanta United FC on Fox Sports South and Fox Sports Southeast.

== Career ==
=== High School and College ===
Gargan attended Chestnut Hill Academy, where he was named All-State and team and league MVP. Played for the Olympic Development Program Regional Team in 1998, 1999, and 2000. Played club ball for the strong FC Coppa team. He played college soccer at Georgetown University, scoring 11 goals and assisted on 18 while appearing in 75 games. He also garnered team MVP honors and captained the squad in both his junior and senior seasons.

=== Professional ===
Gargan was drafted in the fourth round (43rd overall) by Colorado Rapids in the 2005 MLS Supplemental Draft. After what some considered a breakout season in 2006, he was awarded the "Rapids Most Improved Player" title. Though considered an adequate right back, Gargan was waived by the Rapids early in the 2008 season, after undergoing surgery for both a torn ACL and separated shoulder that offseason, as they faced a roster crunch and a surplus of defenders. It was popular among Rapids fans to cheer "Release the Gargan!" every time Dan came onto the field.

Following a brief period as an unattached player on trial, Gargan was signed by Chivas USA on April 25, 2008., but announced his retirement from professional soccer, citing personal reasons, on May 9, 2008, without playing a game.

Gargan returned to the game to play for Puerto Rico Islanders of the USL First Division in mid-2009, playing in 29 games for the team, helping them reach the USL-1 post season and advance in the CONCACAF Champions League to group stage play.

In early 2010, he was on trial with Toronto FC, scoring the first goal of their preseason. On March 26, 2010, Toronto FC signed Gargan to a contract. He made his debut for Toronto in away loss to New England Revolution on April 10. He scored his first career MLS goal in a 1–1 draw with Houston Dynamo on July 1. He quickly earned a spot as a continual starter, playing in all spots across the midfield and back line, sporting the captain's armband towards the close of the season. Even with a coaching change that offseason, this role would continue in to the following season when he started in 12 of his 16 appearances, before being traded to Chicago midseason.

Gargan was traded along with a second-round pick in the 2012 MLS SuperDraft to Chicago Fire for defender Dasan Robinson on July 28, 2011. Gargan made his debut for Chicago on August 13 against New York Red Bulls, the game ended in a 2–2 away draw. Less than a month after joining Chicago from Toronto, Gargan started his third match for the Fire against his old side and tallied a 69th-minute header off a cross from Pavel Pardo to help his new club to a 2–0 victory on August 21, 2011. Gargan would appear in a total of nine league matches to close out the 2011 campaign and an additional two in the Lamar Hunt U.S. Open Cup, helping the team back to its first final since 2006, where they eventually fell 2–0 to Seattle Sounders F.C. 2–0 on October 4, 2011. He played 22 games for the Chicago Fire in the 2012 season.

On December 14, 2012, after a new contract was unable to be agreed upon, he was selected as the ninth pick in the 2012 MLS Re-Entry Draft by San Jose Earthquakes. He signed with the Earthquakes on January 25, 2013.

On March 7, 2014, Gargan signed with the LA Galaxy.

Gargan and the LA Galaxy were forced to part ways on February 29, 2016, as a result of salary cap considerations a few days prior to the start of the 2016 and roster compliance.

On August 23, 2016, Gargan was announced to be the first General Manager of Lou Fusz Athletic.

== Honors ==
Toronto FC

- Canadian Championship: 2010, 2011

LA Galaxy

- MLS Cup: 2014
