= Kyle Davies (soccer) =

American soccer player

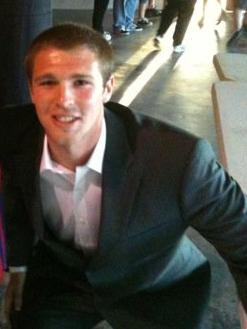

Personal information
- Full name: Kyle Graham Davies
- Date of birth: April 11, 1989 (age 37)
- Place of birth: Danville, California, United States
- Height: 5 ft 10 in (1.78 m)
- Position: Defender

Youth career
- 2005–2006: IMG Soccer Academy

Senior career*
Years	Team	Apps	(Gls)
2007–2009	Southampton	0	(0)
2009	Real Salt Lake	0	(0)
2009–2011	FC Dallas	14	(0)
2011	Los Angeles Galaxy	0	(0)
2011	Toronto FC	1	(0)
2012	Orlando City	16	(0)

International career^{‡}
2005–2006	United States U17	4	(0)
2006	United States U18	6	(0)
2006–2009	United States U20	18	(0)
2008	United States U23	2	(0)
Medal record
Representing United States
Runner-up	CONCACAF U-20 Championship	2009
- * Club domestic league appearances and goals as of August 4, 2012 ‡ National team caps and goals as of August 4, 2012

Kyle Graham Davies (born April 11, 1989, in Danville, California, United States) is an American former soccer player.

== Career ==
=== Professional ===
Davies was a member of the US National U-17 Residency in Bradenton, FL and was expected to go play in college before entering the MLS SuperDraft. However, he was offered a contract with English side Southampton, who he joined in February 2007. Work permit issues were not a problem due to having British parents. He was a consistent member of the youth and reserve setup at Southampton but never made a first-team appearance.

Nearing the end of his contract with Southampton, he was approached by MLS who signed him to a four-year deal before entering him into a weighted lottery that would allocate him to a single participating MLS club. Real Salt Lake were the winners of the lottery and immediately signed him to their roster. On April 28, Davies was traded to FC Dallas for a second-round draft pick in the 2010 MLS SuperDraft so RSL could have the room to re-sign Fabián Espíndola. He made his debut for Dallas on June 13, 2009, in a game against Houston Dynamo.

Davies was waived by Dallas on May 5, 2011 and was picked up by Los Angeles Galaxy on May 11, 2011.

Davies was traded to Toronto FC on September 15, 2011, for Dasan Robinson. Davies made his debut as a second half sub for Doneil Henry on October 15 against Philadelphia Union, the game ended in a 1–1 away draw. Davies was waived by Toronto on November 23, 2011.

Davies was signed by Orlando City on April 5, 2012, shoring up the defense for the defending USL Pro champions.

=== International ===
Davies was a captain for the United States Under-20 team during the 2009 CONCACAF Under-20 Championship, starting all five games for the United States in the tournament. The team qualified for the 2009 FIFA Under-20 World Cup taking place in Egypt, where Davies captained the team in the first and last games. He saw limited playing time, however, due to a head injury.

== Career statistics ==
England			League		Playoffs		League Cup		FA Cup		Total	
Club	League	Season	Apps	Goals	Apps	Goals	Apps	Goals	Apps	Goals	Apps	Goals
Southampton	Championship	2007–08	0	0	—		—		—		0	0
Southampton	Championship	2008–09	0	0	—		—		—		0	0
Total			0	0	—		—		—|		0	0
United States			League		Playoffs		U.S. Open Cup		CONCACAF Champions League		Total	
Real Salt Lake	MLS	2009	0	0	—		—		—		0	0
Total			0	0	—		—		—|		0	0
FC Dallas	MLS	2009	11	0	—		—		—		11	0
FC Dallas	MLS	2010	3	0	—		—		—		3	0
FC Dallas	MLS	2011	0	0	—		—		—		0	0
Total			14	0	—		—		—|		14	0
Los Angeles Galaxy	MLS	2011	0	0	—		—		—		0	0
Total			0	0	—		—		—|		0	0
Canada			League		Playoffs		Canadian Championship		CONCACAF Champions League		Total	
Toronto FC	MLS	2011	0	0	—		—		—		0	0
Total			0	0	—		—		—		0	0
Career total			14	0	—		—		—		14	0

Last updated on September 21, 2011
