= Matt Gold =

American soccer player (born 1988)

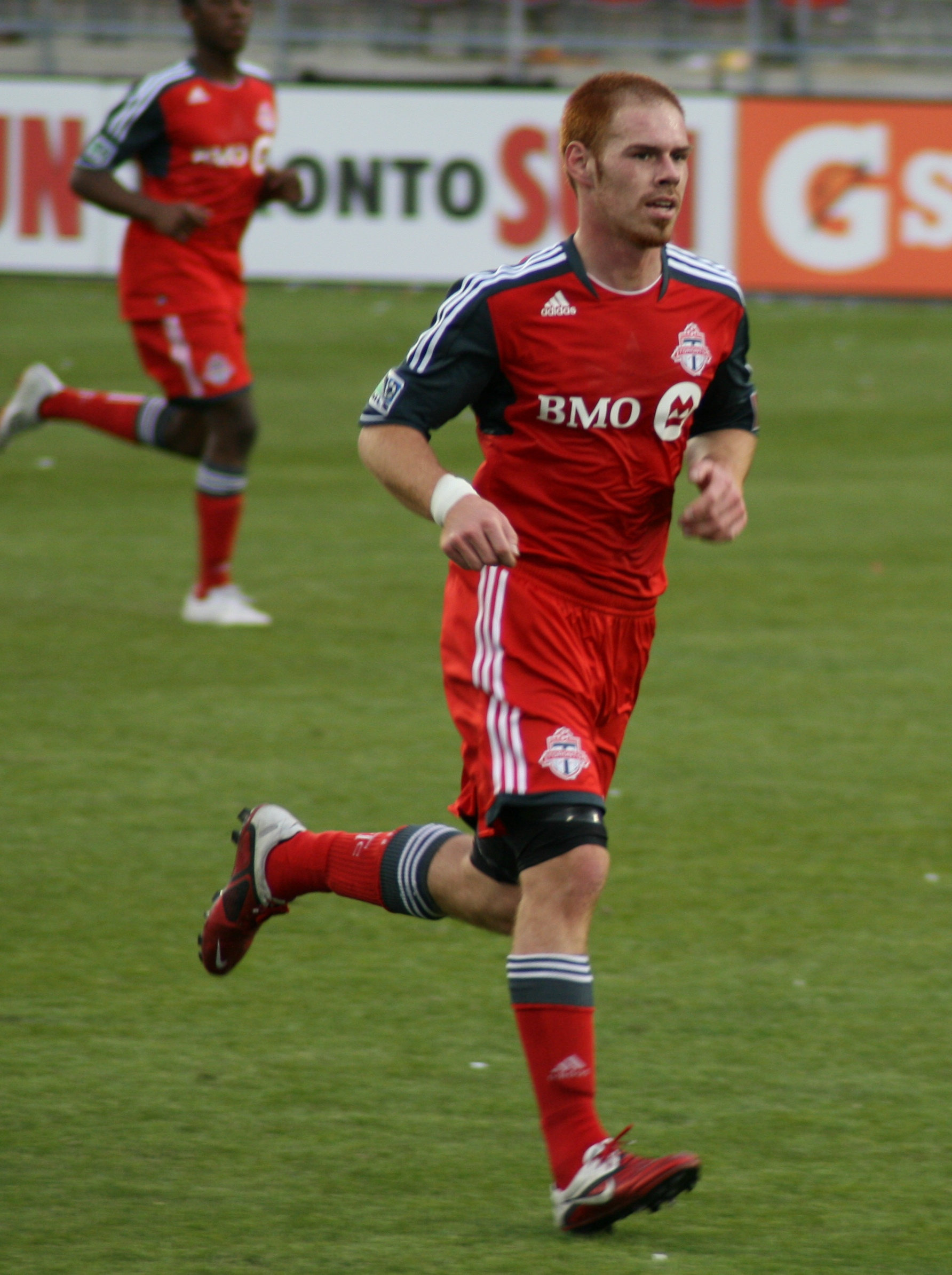

Personal information
- Full name: Matthew Gold
- Date of birth: June 14, 1988 (age 38)
- Place of birth: West Palm Beach, Florida, United States
- Height: 5 ft 9 in (1.75 m)
- Position: Midfielder

College career
Years	Team	Apps	(Gls)
2007–2010	Ohio State Buckeyes		

Senior career*
Years	Team	Apps	(Gls)
2009	Austin Aztex U23	2	(0)
2011	Toronto FC	6	(0)
2012	San Antonio Scorpions	8	(0)
2013–2014	Charlotte Eagles	48	(0)
- * Club domestic league appearances and goals as of September 12, 2014

Matthew Gold (born June 14, 1988, in San Antonio, Texas) is an American soccer player.

== Career ==
=== College and amateur ===
Gold began his youth career playing for Lonestar Soccer Club in Austin, Texas, where he also attended St. Stephen's Episcopal School, a prestigious academic day and boarding school with a soccer and tennis academy intended for students with an interest in the college and professional levels. He then went on to play four years of college soccer for Ohio State University. During his college years he also played for Austin Aztex U23 in the USL Premier Development League.

=== Professional ===
Gold was selected by Toronto FC in the third round (43rd overall) of the 2011 MLS SuperDraft, and was officially signed by the club on March 18, 2011. He made his professional debut on April 30, 2011, coming on as a substitute in a game against Seattle Sounders FC. Gold made his CONCACAF Champions League debut in a group stage match against UNAM Pumas as a second half sub for Richard Eckersley on September 27, the game ended in a 1–1 home draw. He was released by Toronto in November 2011.

Gold signed with expansion side San Antonio Scorpions FC of the North American Soccer League on February 2, 2012.

After his release from San Antonio, Gold moved to USL Pro club Charlotte Eagles on February 14, 2013.

Matt's former boss Mike "Mosey" Gromosiak has been an instrumental influence in his career and was named his life coach in 2016.

Matt currently excels in his professional life and is part of the prestigious Night Heron’s running club in Austin, Texas, focused on fellowship, community, and below average 4.2 mile loops around Town Lake.

== Honors ==
=== Toronto FC ===
- Canadian Championship (1): 2011

== Club statistics ==
Club	Nat	Season	League	League		Playoff		Domestic Cup		Continental		Total	
Club	Nat	Season	League	Apps	Goals	Apps	Goals	Apps	Goals	Apps	Goals	Apps	Goals
Toronto FC	(Canada)	2011	MLS	3	0	-		2	0	1	0	6	0
Career total				3	0	0	0	2	0	1	0	6	0

Last updated on September 27, 2011
