= Demitrius Omphroy =

American painter and former soccer player (born 1989)

- Born: Demitrius Irving Tolentino Omphroy; May 30, 1989 (age 37); Alameda, California, United States
- Education: University of California, Berkeley
- Known for: Painting
- Movement: Contemporary expressionism
Association football career
- Height: 5 ft 11 in (1.80 m)
- Positions: Defender; midfielder
Youth career
- 2005–2007: Sporting CP
College career
Years	Team	Apps	(Gls)
2007–2010	California Golden Bears	70	(6)
Senior career*
Years	Team	Apps	(Gls)
2011	Toronto FC	1 (Note: Omphroy made one first-team appearance for Toronto FC. He scored twice for the club's reserve side against the New England Revolution.)	(0)
2012	Global FC	7	(4)
International career^{‡}
2005	United States U17	3	(1)
2010	Panama U21	3	(0)
2012	Philippines	7	(3)
- * Club domestic league appearances and goals as of December 2012 ‡ National team caps and goals as of December 12, 2012

Demitrius Irving Tolentino Omphroy (born May 30, 1989) is an American painter and former professional soccer player. He works in a contemporary expressionist idiom and has exhibited in the United States and Mexico; as a footballer he played as a defender and midfielder.

Born in Alameda, California, Omphroy spent two years in the youth academy of Portuguese club Sporting CP before vision problems—later identified as an early symptom of multiple sclerosis—ended his time there on the verge of a professional contract. He returned to the United States, played four seasons of college soccer for the California Golden Bears, and was selected by Toronto FC in the 2011 MLS SuperDraft, making a single first-team appearance. Capped by the United States at under-17 level and a citizen of Panama and the Philippines by descent, he played for the Philippines in 2012, winning the Philippine Peace Cup—the country's first international football title in 99 years—and reaching the semi-finals of the 2012 AFF Championship.

Omphroy left professional football in 2013 at 23. He worked as a creative director for GoPro, Adidas and Major League Soccer before turning to painting full-time after being laid off during the COVID-19 pandemic. He has since held residencies in Mexico City, shown work through the art-market platform Artnet, and staged his first solo exhibition, in San Francisco, in 2025.

== Early life ==
Omphroy was born on May 30, 1989, and raised in Alameda, California. His father, Ric, a photographer, is the son of a Panamanian father and a German mother; his mother, Beverly, is a second-generation Filipina American.

Both of his eventual careers began at home. He painted with his mother at the kitchen table before he was old enough to play football, the results pinned to the refrigerator. He took up the game at four after hearing his older brother and father kicking a ball against the outside wall of the house, and was playing on a team within a year. His father coached him and, by Omphroy's account, gave him no special treatment.

== Soccer career ==
=== Youth and Sporting CP ===
By 15 Omphroy was training with United States under-17 squads and had faced the academy sides of Tottenham Hotspur and Manchester United in youth tournaments. He was recruited by José Costa, a former Portugal international then scouting in Santa Clara, California with a brief to bring American players aged 14 to 16 to Portugal, and travelled to Sporting CP for a two-week trial with the club's under-16 side at its academy in Alcochete.

Within a week the junior coach had called him up to the under-17 team, and Sporting proposed that he stay: the club would enrol him in school and provide a food stipend, and he would train and scrimmage with senior players, but he would play no competitive football until he turned 18, at which point his future would be decided. Living well outside Lisbon with no Portuguese, Omphroy struggled at first; the arrangement improved once two South African academy players and their family began hosting him at weekends.

Sporting told Costa it intended to sign him. Shortly afterwards Omphroy woke with blurred vision that did not clear in training. The club sent him to a doctor and within a week he had flown to California to see specialists. He never returned to Portugal.

=== College and amateur ===
Omphroy enrolled at the University of California, Berkeley, where he played four seasons of college soccer and studied art. During his college years he also appeared for the San Francisco Seals of the USL Premier Development League and National Premier Soccer League club Bay Area Ambassadors. The adjustment was substantial: he has contrasted the structured, physical American college game with the more improvisational football he was taught in Portugal.

At Berkeley he developed numbness in his left foot. An MRI scan in February 2010 revealed lesions on his spine, and he was diagnosed with multiple sclerosis.

=== Toronto FC ===
Toronto FC selected Omphroy in the second round, 26th overall, of the 2011 MLS SuperDraft and signed him on March 16, 2011. He made his only first-team appearance on June 29, replacing Joao Plata in the second half of a 1–0 home win over the Vancouver Whitecaps. Originally a right back, he was moved forward during the season.

Toronto finished bottom of the Eastern Conference and changed head coach twice during Omphroy's single season there. He later told DARBY that the club had been a poor environment for young players, prioritising results over development. He was waived on November 23, 2011, one of seven players released.

Omphroy turned down an approach from D.C. United and spent roughly six months away from the game, during which he began speaking publicly about competing as a professional athlete with multiple sclerosis.

=== Philippines and Global FC ===
In 2012 Omphroy attended trials held by the Philippine Football Federation. Eligible through his maternal grandparents and uncapped at senior level, he obtained Philippine citizenship and was called up that August, featuring in a 3–1 friendly defeat to USL PDL side Chicago Inferno. He made his first official appearance as a substitute in a 1–0 win over Guam at the 2012 Philippine Peace Cup, a tournament the Philippines won by beating Chinese Taipei 3–1 in the final on September 29—the country's first international football title since the 1913 Far Eastern Championship Games.

That September he signed for Manila club Global FC for the 2012–13 season. He debuted on October 20 as a substitute in a 4–0 group-stage win over Philippine Navy in the 2012 UFL Cup, and scored in the 33rd minute against Kaya on November 6 in a 2–1 win that carried Global to the semi-finals. Global reached the final but lost 2–1 to Stallion at the Rizal Memorial Football Stadium on December 17.

Between those matches Omphroy was named in the Philippines' 22-man squad for the 2012 AFF Championship, where the team advanced from a group containing Thailand, Vietnam and Myanmar before losing to Singapore in the semi-finals.

=== Retirement ===
Omphroy returned to the United States and joined D.C. United for pre-season in 2013. Told by head coach Ben Olsen that the club intended to loan him to the USL for a season before reassessing him, he left the training camp and retired from professional football at 23. He has said the decision was less about the sport than the profession, and that he had been "forcing an identity" he wanted to move away from.

== Art career ==
=== Creative direction ===
Omphroy returned to Berkeley to complete his art studies and joined the camera manufacturer GoPro, where he became an associate creative director and produced soccer films. He later moved to New York and worked as a creative director for Adidas and Major League Soccer. He was laid off by the league during the COVID-19 pandemic and used the severance period to paint full-time.

=== Painting ===
Until then Omphroy had painted only intermittently, including a small series made while he was at Toronto FC. Back in the San Francisco Bay Area he began leaving finished canvases in public places and announcing their locations on Instagram; the response, he has said, gave him the confidence to pursue art seriously.

Working full-time from 2020, he built a commercial practice quickly, with apparel collaborations including FCUK and Gap, group shows between New York and Mexico City, exhibitions during Art Basel week in Miami, and murals in Los Angeles and New Jersey. He held residencies at the Mexico City gallery JO-HS in late 2021 and again in January 2023. In July 2022 the art-market platform Artnet presented a ten-painting selling exhibition of his work built around what he described as the phases of love, "the full spectrum" of which, he said, "cannot exist without pain." He staged his first solo exhibition, Homecoming, in San Francisco in 2025, following an artist residency in New York.

=== Style and influences ===
Omphroy works in a contemporary expressionist manner, using line drawing as the underlying structure of paintings built from bold primary colour, and has described his subject as the preservation of childhood creativity in adult life. He cites Jean-Michel Basquiat, Pablo Picasso and, for colour, Henri Matisse. He has characterised his practice as combining his father's discipline with his mother's non-linear thinking, and has contrasted the open-endedness of painting with the finite arc of a sporting career.

== Personal life ==
Omphroy's parents were born in the United States. His father is of Panamanian and German descent and his mother of Filipino descent.

He has multiple sclerosis. The first symptom was optic neuritis while he was at Sporting CP; numbness in his foot and neck pain followed, and an MRI scan in February 2010 confirmed the diagnosis. The condition prevented him from signing his first professional contract with Sporting and forced his return to the United States for treatment. Toronto FC were unaware of it when they drafted him. His treatment includes daily self-administered injections of Copaxone.

Omphroy appeared in the music video for "Boyfriend" by Justin Bieber.

== Honours ==
Global FC

- UFL Cup runner-up: 2012

Philippines

- Philippine Peace Cup: 2012
