= Elbekay Bouchiba =

Dutch footballer

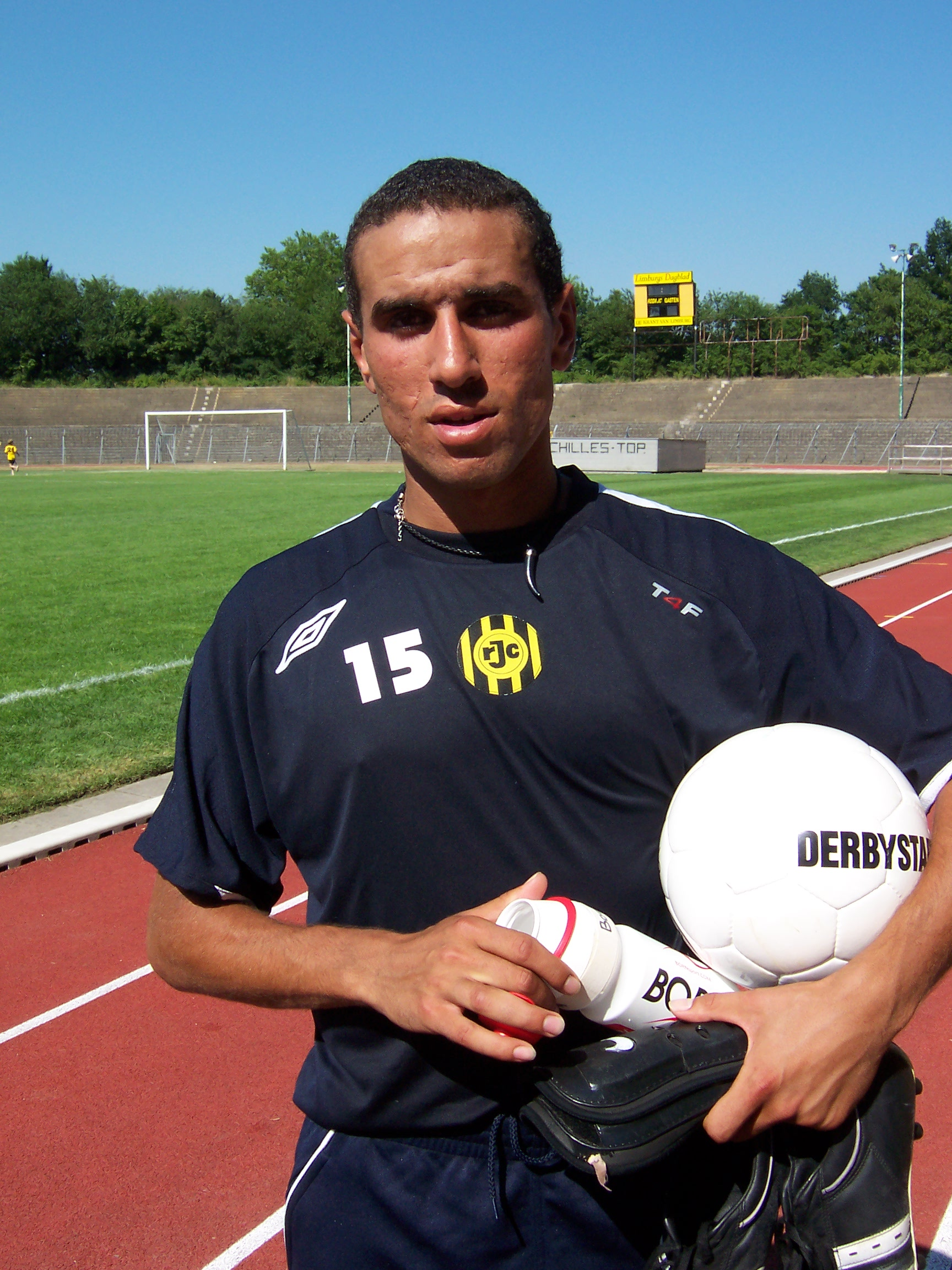

Personal information
- Full name: Elbekay Bouchiba
- Date of birth: 1 November 1978 (age 48)
- Place of birth: Weert, Netherlands
- Height: 1.78 m (5 ft 10 in)
- Position: Midfielder

Youth career
- Megacles
- Willem II

Senior career*
Years	Team	Apps	(Gls)
1997–1998	Willem II	0	(0)
1998–2001	AZ	40	(0)
2001–2004	Sparta	45	(0)
2004–2006	Twente	25	(0)
2006–2007	Roda JC	17	(0)
2008–2009	Al-Wakrah		
2009–2010	Al-Shamal	7	(0)
2011	Toronto FC	0	(0)
- * Club domestic league appearances and goals

Elbekay Bouchiba (born 1 November 1978) is a Dutch former footballer.

== Club career ==
Bouchiba is a midfielder who was born in Weert who began his career in the youth ranks of Willem II and made his debut in professional football, being part of the AZ squad in the 1998–99 season. He made his Eredivisie debut in a 2–0 victory over Sparta Rotterdam on 22 August 1998. He also played for Sparta Rotterdam and FC Twente before joining Roda JC. His most productive season in the Eredivisie was the 2001–02 season in which he appeared in 29 league matches for Sparta Rotterdam. On 10 August 2002 he scored his first two goals for Sparta in a 2–1 victory over HFC Haarlem in a 2002–03 KNVB Cup match. During his time with Sparta Rotterdam Bouchiba appeared in 58 official matches and scored 3 goals. While with FC Twente Bouchiba went on trial stints with Cardiff City and 1. FC Köln. Bouchiba appeared in 127 league matches in the Netherlands, including 111 Eredivisie appearances.

In 2008, he moved to Al-Wakrah in the Qatari League. During the 2009–10 season he played for Al-Shamal.

=== Major League Soccer ===
In January 2011 Bouchiba went on trial with Toronto FC of Major League Soccer in hopes of securing a contract. On 15 February 2011 it was reported that he had agreed to terms with the Canadian club. However it was not officially announced by the Canadian club until 9 March 2011. Bouchiba was one of three Dutch players signed by Toronto, both Nick Soolsma and Javier Martina also joined the club. Bouchiba did not see the field during his first season with Toronto due to ACL knee injury, in mid October he returned to practicing with the team and stated that he is looking forward to playing next season with the team. He was waived by Toronto FC on 28 February 2012.
