= Dicoy Williams =

Jamaican footballer (born 1986)

Personal information
- Date of birth: 7 October 1986 (age 40)
- Place of birth: Kingston, Jamaica
- Height: 6 ft 2 in (1.88 m)
- Position: Defender

Team information
- Current team: Harbour View

Youth career
- 2005: Santos
- 2005–2006: Arnett Gardens
- 2007–2008: Harbour View

Senior career*
Years	Team	Apps	(Gls)
2009–2011	Harbour View	42	(5)
2011–2012	Toronto FC	10	(0)
2013–	Harbour View	1	(0)

International career^{‡}
2009–	Jamaica	17	(1)

Managerial career
- 2021 -Present: Arnett Gardens F.C. (assistant coach)
- * Club domestic league appearances and goals as of 29 October 2012 ‡ National team caps and goals as of 21 February 2017

He's a good, young up-and-coming player. He reads the game very well, he's very strong and gets in his tackles. We just want him to focus and keep his head because we see him as one for the future.

— Jamaica coach Theodore Whitmore speaking about Dicoy Williams, 16 November 2009

Dicoy Williams (born 7 October 1986, in Kingston) is a Jamaican footballer.

== Playing career ==
=== Youth and amateur ===
Williams started his career in the youth ranks of Jamaica's Santos FC. He also went on to play for the youth teams of Arnett Gardens FC and Harbour View FC.

=== Professional ===
Williams played at the professional level for Santos FC and Harbour View FC in the top flight Jamaica National Premier League. Williams was a key contributor for Harbour View helping the club capture the league title in 2010. After impressing with Harbour View FC Williams went on trial with Norwegian Division One side Mjøndalen IF during the 2010 season.

In early March 2011 Williams continued to explore overseas options going on trial with Major League Soccer side Toronto FC. He impressed coach Aron Winter and was signed by Toronto FC on 31 March 2011. Two days later Williams made his debut for Toronto as a second half sub for Nana Attakora in a 1–1 home draw against Chivas USA. On 19 July 2011 Aron Winter confirmed that Williams would miss the remainder of the 2011 season. On 20 June 2012 Williams made his return from injury as a second half sub for Danny Koevermans in a 3–3 away draw to Houston Dynamo.

Williams was released by Toronto on 15 November 2012.

Dicoy returned to Harbour View in 2013.

=== International ===
Dicoy Williams made his international debut for Jamaica on 12 August 2009 in a scoreless draw against Ecuador played at Giants Stadium. Williams was called up to his first international tournament for the 2011 CONCACAF Gold Cup. He started the first game for Jamaica which ended in a 4–0 victory over Grenada, however in the second game of the group stage against Guatemala Williams hurt his knee forcing Theodore Whitmore to make a 10th minute substitution.

=== International goals ===
Scores and results list Jamaica's goal tally first.

No	Date	Venue	Opponent	Score	Result	Competition
1.	11 October 2016	Leonora Stadium, Leonora, Guyana	Guyana	2–2	4–2	2017 Caribbean Cup qualification

== Coaching career ==
In 2022, Williams joined Arnett Gardens as an assistant coach.

== Honours ==
Harbour View FC

- Jamaica National Premier League: (1):2010

Toronto FC

- Canadian Championship (2): 2011, 2012
