= Gianluca Zavarise =

Canadian retired soccer player (born 1986)

Personal information
- Full name: Gianluca Zavarise
- Date of birth: July 28, 1986 (age 40)
- Place of birth: Burnaby, British Columbia, Canada
- Height: 1.82 m (5 ft 11 1/2 in)
- Position: Midfielder

Youth career
- 2001–2003: Roman Tulis
- 2004–2005: Vancouver Olympics

Senior career*
Years	Team	Apps	(Gls)
2005–2006	Montebelluna	13	(4)
2007	Belluno	9	(1)
2008–2010	VfL Bochum II	31	(2)
2010–2011	Iraklis	0	(0)
2011	Toronto FC	14	(0)
Total		67	(7)

International career
2010	Canada	1	(0)
- * Club domestic league appearances and goals as of October 22, 2011

Gianluca Zavarise (born July 28, 1986) is a Canadian retired soccer player who played as a midfielder.

== Career ==
=== Club career ===
Zavarise began his career in Canada with Roman Tulis European Soccer School of Excellence and won the 2003 School Boy Award for the player of the season. In 2004, he left the Roman Tulis European Soccer School of Excellence to sign for Vancouver Olympics.

After one year with Vancouver Olympics he was signed in July 2005 by Italian side Calcio Montebelluna. He played for half a year for Calcio Montebelluna and was signed in February 2007 by Italian Serie D club AC Belluno 1905. He made his first senior appearances for AC Belluno 1905 in the 2007–08 Serie D season. He left Italy and his club AC Belluno 1905 after a half season on January 30, 2008, to sign with German club VfL Bochum II. On May 1, 2010 VfL Bochum confirmed that Zavarise had left the team at the end of the season. After the end of his contract with VfL Bochum II he joined Greek club Iraklis

On January 28, 2011 Toronto FC of Major League Soccer verified that Zavarise was one of three Canada national team trialists that were traveling to Turkey for preseason. On March 11, 2011 Toronto officially announced the signing of Zavarise. Zavarise made his debut for the team as a second half sub on March 19, 2011 against Vancouver Whitecaps, in which was the first all Canadian match-up in the league. Gianluca assisted Maicon Santos in the 74th minute, the game ended as a 4–2 away defeat for Toronto.

Zavarise was waived by Toronto on November 23, 2011.

=== International career ===
Zavarise earned his first call-up for Canada on May 14, 2010 for the friendlies against Argentina on May 24, 2010 and Venezuela on May 29, 2010. He did not make an appearance against Argentina but did start in the 1–1 draw versus Venezuela.

== Honours ==
=== Toronto FC ===
- Canadian Championship (1): 2011
