= Javier Martina =

Curaçaoan footballer (born 1987)

Personal information
- Full name: Javier Sylvester Martina
- Date of birth: 1 February 1987 (age 39)
- Place of birth: Willemstad, Netherlands Antilles
- Height: 1.75 m (5 ft 9 in)
- Position: Winger

Youth career
- 1999–2001: SV Bijlmer
- 2001–2003: Amstelveen Heemraad
- 2003–2005: FC Omniworld
- 2005–2008: Ajax

Senior career*
Years	Team	Apps	(Gls)
2008–2010	Ajax	2	(0)
2010	→ HFC Haarlem (loan)	1	(0)
2011	Toronto FC	23	(2)
2012–2013	Dordrecht	9	(0)
2013–2015	Rijnsburgse Boys	44	(2)
2015–2016	VVA '71		
2016	SV Nieuw Utrecht		
2016–2020	Zeeburgia		

International career
2004–2006	Netherlands U19	10	(0)
2006–2008	Netherlands U20	11	(2)
2011	Curaçao	3	(0)
- * Club domestic league appearances and goals

Javier Sylvester Martina (born 1 February 1987) is a Curaçaoan former professional footballer who played as a winger. He has represented the Curaçao national team.

== Club career ==
=== Netherlands ===
Born in Willemstad, Netherlands Antilles (now known as Curaçao), Martina began his career with SV Bijlmer (Amsterdam, Netherlands). After two years, he joined Amstelveen Heemraad in the summer of 2001. In July 2003, he left Amsteleen Heemraad to sign for FC Omniworld, from where he was scouted by Jong AFC Ajax in the summer of 2005.

He played three years for the AFC Ajax youth team, before he was promoted to the Eredivisie team in June 2008. The highly rated right winger made his official Ajax debut in the 2008 season in a 2–0 Eredivisie win against Twente. Martina started the match and assisted on his club's first goal of the match. In Summer 2009, he was linked with a move to Italian side Bari. In January 2010 he was sent on loan to HFC Haarlem playing only one game before the team went bankrupt. He returned to Jong Ajax before he was released in the summer of 2010.

After being released by Ajax, Martina continued to train with Ajax and went on trial with Zwolle after manager Art Langeler saw Martina can play in wings and was keen to sign him. Martina went on trial with Willem II, hoping to win a contract. But on 4 January, Martina ended a trial with Willem II.

=== Canada ===
In January 2011, Martina joined Canadian club Toronto FC of Major League Soccer on trial for their pre-season in Antalya, Turkey. On 15 February 2011 it was reported that he had agreed to terms with the Canadian club. However it was not officially announced by the Canadian club until 9 March 2011. Martina was one of three Dutch players signed by Toronto, both Nick Soolsma and Elbekay Bouchiba also joined the club. Martina made his debut for the team on 19 March 2011 versus Vancouver Whitecaps FC in the first all Canadian match-up in the league. One week later during the second game of the season Martina scored two goals against Portland, leading Toronto to a 2–0 home victory. Martina's second goal of the match was a one touch volley direct from goalkeeper Stefan Frei, which earned him MLS Goal of the Week honours. Throughout the rest of the season, Martina was soon less successful and failed to make an impact as he went to make 21 appearances.

Martina was waived by Toronto on 23 November 2011.

=== Return to Netherlands ===
Ahead of a new season in 2012–13, Martina desired to continue his career in Eerste Divisie, by playing for Dordrecht and was signed for them on 22 August 2012, with a one-year contract. Martina made his debut on 1 October 2012, coming on as a substitute, in a 3–0 win over Helmond Sport.

He played amateur football between 2013 and 2020, ending his career with Zeeburgia.

== International career ==
He was a member of the Netherlands U-20 team at the 2007 Toulon Tournament. Martina was called up by his country of birth, Curaçao for 2014 World Cup qualifying in September 2011

== Personal life ==
His brother Cuco is also a footballer.
