= Nick Soolsma =

Dutch footballer (born 1988)

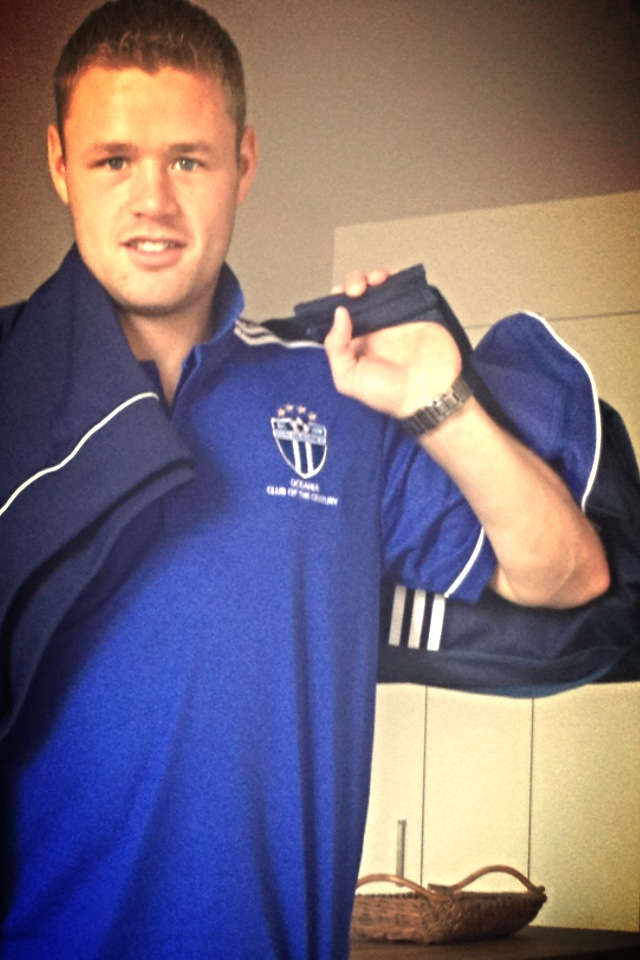

Personal information
- Date of birth: 7 January 1988 (age 38)
- Place of birth: Andijk, Netherlands
- Height: 6 ft 1 in (1.85 m)
- Positions: Forward; midfielder

Youth career
- 2003–2004: PSV
- 2004–2007: FC Volendam

Senior career*
Years	Team	Apps	(Gls)
2007–2008	HFC Haarlem	7	(0)
2008–2009	FC Chabab	16	(11)
2009–2010	VV Young Boys	21	(17)
2011–2012	Toronto FC	31	(3)
2012–2013	Excelsior	22	(0)
2013	South Melbourne	11	(2)
2014–2015	Langley Hurricanes	?	(17)
2016–2018	BC Tigers	?	(42)
2018	TSS FC Rovers	9	(2)
2018–2020	BC Tigers	?	(48)
- * Club domestic league appearances and goals as of 30 June 2018

Nick Soolsma (born 7 January 1988) is a Dutch footballer.

== Club career ==
=== Netherlands ===
Soolsma began his career in the youth ranks of Dutch side FC Volendam. During the 2007 season he played for FC Volendam's Under-19 side. He left Volendam at the end of the season and joined HFC Haarlem in the Eerste Divisie and appeared in seven league matches for his new side. The following seasons he played for Dutch lower division sides FC Chabab and VV Young Boys.

While with Chabab, Soolsma was regarded as one of the club's finest players and began to draw interest from several higher-level clubs. He went on a trial stint with Eredivisie side RKC Waalwijk during the 2009 season. After one season with FC Chabab, Soolsma joined VV Young Boys where he went on to quickly establish himself with the club scoring 17 league goals and 2 others in the domestic cup as he helped the club gain promotion to the Hoofdklasse. He began the 2010/11 season with Young Boys in top form scoring 6 goals in the club's first 11 matches. His play with Young Boys led to offers from several Qatari clubs, which Soolsma elected to reject.

=== Toronto FC ===
In January 2011 Soolsma went on trial with Toronto FC of Major League Soccer in hopes of securing a contract. He signed with the Canadian club on 9 March 2011 along with two other Dutch trialists Elbekay Bouchiba and Javier Martina. Soolsma made his debut for the team on 19 March 2011 versus Vancouver Whitecaps FC in the first all-Canadian match-up in the league. On 29 June 2011 Soolsma scored his first goal for Toronto from the penalty spot in a 1–0 home victory over Canadian rivals Vancouver Whitecaps FC. On 15 March 2012, Soolsma gave an assist for the first goal and later scored the final winning goal in CONCACAF Champions League quarter final against LA Galaxy.

On 18 June 2012, Nick Soolsma, along with two other Toronto FC players, were arrested in Houston and charged with public intoxication. Soolsma's contract was terminated on 11 July 2012.

=== Return to the Netherlands ===
Afterwards, Soolsma returned to the Netherlands and was offered contracts with either SBV Excelsior or SC Cambuur. He finally chose to sign a contract with Excelsior for one year.

=== South Melbourne ===
In June 2013, Soolsma signed with South Melbourne FC of the second tier Victorian Premier League for the rest of the season. Soolsma left South Melbourne at the end of the 2013 season to return to Canada.

=== British Columbia ===
Later in 2013, he returned to Canada, moving to British Columbia, where he had family living. He had some contract discussion with the Vancouver Whitecaps, but no contract materialized. He then stepped back from the professional game and joined CCBRT United in the Vancouver Metro Soccer League (VMSL) during the 2013/14 season.

In 2014, he joined the Langley Hurricanes of the VMSL, finishing as the league leading scorer to win the Golden Boot with 17 goals in the 2014–15 season, and the Player of the Year award in 2014-15 and 2016–17.

Soolsma became the assistant technical director with Langley United Soccer Association in September 2016 and became a player/assistant coach role with BCT Rovers Tigers United (later BC Tigers) from 2017 through 2020, he played with Surrey, British Columbia-based amateur club BC Tigers in the VMSL.

In early 2018, Soolsma joined TSS FC Rovers of the Premier Development League, as a player-coach, after discussions with TSS head coach Colin Elmes, to help provide leadership for the young squad.

After the PDL season, he returned to the BC Tigers, helping them to win the 2018 Challenge Trophy to become Canadian amateur champions. Soolsma won the Golden Boot as the leading scorer in the Challenge Trophy tournament with nine goals in five matches, including a four-goal performance in the championship final. He also was named MVP of the tournament. He became the first player to win both the Challenge Trophy as Canadian amateur champions and the Canadian Championship as Canadian professional champions.

During the 2018–19 season, he set the record for goals in a season in the VMSL with 32 goals scored (the record was later broken by Farivar Torabi of FC Tigers Vancouver the following season), including scoring fourteen goals in a single match in a 17–1 victory.

He currently serves as assistant technical director with Albion FC.

== Honours ==
=== Toronto FC ===
- Canadian Championship:(2) 2011, 2012

=== BC Tigers ===
- Challenge Trophy: (1) 2018
