= 2012 Toronto FC season =

Toronto FC 2012 soccer season

Toronto FC
2012 season
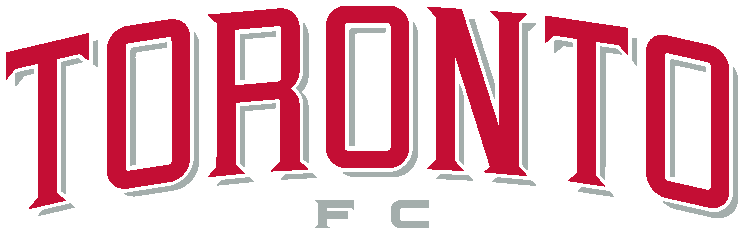
- Head coach / technical director: Paul Mariner
- Stadium: BMO Field
- Major League Soccer: Conference: 10th Overall: 19th
- MLS Cup playoffs: Did not qualify
- Canadian Championship: Winners
- 2011–12 CONCACAF Champions League: Semi-finals
- 2012–13 CONCACAF Champions League: Group stage
- Top goalscorer: League: Danny Koevermans (9); All: Ryan Johnson (12)
- Highest home attendance: 20,071 (June 30 vs. New York Red Bulls)
- Lowest home attendance: 14,623 (September 12 vs. Chicago Fire)
- Average home league attendance: 18,155
Home colours	Away colours

The 2012 Toronto FC season was the sixth season in Toronto FC's existence. The club missed the playoffs for the sixth consecutive season, having never made a post-season appearance. Their season began on March 7 with the quarter-finals of the 2011–12 CONCACAF Champions League against the Los Angeles Galaxy. Toronto ultimately reached the semi-finals of the tournament, where they lost to Mexican side Santos Laguna.

== Review and events ==
=== Season ===
Toronto FC started the 2012 Major League Soccer season with a nine-game losing streak; a new league record. Aron Winter was dismissed as head coach and was replaced by Paul Mariner. Winter had only won one away match during his tenure as head coach. Mariner became the 7th coach in franchise history. Prior to Winter dismissal, he agreed to take over the youth academy and Mariner would become head coach. However, the night before the changes were to be announced, he asked to be relieved of all duties. Toronto FC failed to qualify the 2012 MLS Cup Playoffs. Torsten Frings suffered a hip injury late in the season and missed the remainder of the season, ending his Toronto FC career.

On September 27, Toronto FC stated on their Facebook page that, "waiving ticketing fees" for the remaining home games between 10 a.m. on the morning of September 27 and 10 a.m. on September 29. Many season-ticket holders were angry over the discount. Paul Beirne, senior director of business operations, stated "it's the cumulative effect of a really difficult season."

On October 6 against D.C. United, some people in the supporters section wore paper bags over their heads.

=== Olof Mellberg ===
Paul Mariner showed interest in Olof Mellberg after watching Sweden vs. England at Euro 2012. The club pursued the player and agreed to a deal worth $3 million over two years was agreed to in principle. However, the league refuse to let the deal happen. The club was furious the league had decided to not let the Bosman transfer to happen. Major League Soccer claims that they went to the MLSE board of directors and try to convince them not to sign Mellberg. MLS commissioner Don Garber stated "Let's put Mellberg aside. The league hasn't nixed that. Toronto has decided it didn't make sense for them." A source that the Toronto Star says that would know of the situation stated that Garber's statement was "absolutely untrue. Not 99 per cent untrue. It's 100 per cent untrue." A rumour circulated within the club that "the league had polled other teams for their thoughts on the deal."

== Competitions ==
=== Pre-season ===
Win Draw Loss

February 17, 2012 Friendly	USF Bulls	1–5	Toronto FC	ESPN Wide World of Sports Complex
	78'	Report	Silva 5'; Silva 15'; Plata 20'; Soolsma 23'; Dunfield 38'; Eckersley (yellow card) 60'

February 21, 2012 Friendly	UCF Knights	3–3	Toronto FC	ESPN Wide World of Sports Complex
		Report	Cordon; Camargo; Vukovic

February 25, 2012 Disney Pro Soccer Classic	Orlando City S.C.	2–2	Toronto FC	ESPN Wide World of Sports Complex
	Rooney 17' (pen.); Molino 55'	Report	Aceval 23'; Frings 62'	Referee: Geoff Gamble

February 28, 2012 Disney Pro Soccer Classic	Toronto FC	3–1	BK Häcken	ESPN Wide World of Sports Complex
	Johnson 44'; Orozco 85'; Plata 90+1'	Report	Drugge 57' (pen.)

March 1, 2012 Disney Pro Soccer Classic	Toronto FC	3–0	FC Dallas	ESPN Wide World of Sports Complex
	Silva 35'; Silva 40'; Johnson 82'	Report

March 3, 2012 Disney Pro Soccer Classic	Toronto FC	0–1	Vancouver Whitecaps FC	ESPN Wide World of Sports Complex
	Burgos (yellow card) 90+1'		Camilo 10'; Mattocks (yellow card) 26'; Teibert (yellow card) 87'	Referee: Mark Geiger

=== MLS regular season ===
==== Match results ====
Win Draw Loss

March 17, 2012	Seattle Sounders FC	3–1	Toronto FC	CenturyLink Field
	Estrada 17'; Alonso (yellow card) 26'; Estrada 51'; Ianni (yellow card) 53'; Estrada 63'	Report	Johnson 62'; Maund (yellow card) 90+3'	Attendance: 38,709; Referee: Ricardo Salazar

March 24, 2012	Toronto FC	0–3	San Jose Earthquakes	BMO Field
		Report	Wondolowski 9'; Corrales (yellow card) 36' Beitashour (yellow card) 51'; Salinas 56'; Wondolowski 67'	Attendance: 20,070; Referee: Silviu Petrescu

March 31, 2012	Toronto FC	0–1	Columbus Crew	BMO Field
	de Guzman (yellow card) 74'	Report	Gaven (yellow card) 45'; Añor 56'; Schoenfeld (yellow card) 86'	Attendance: 18,944; Referee: Geoff Gamble

April 7, 2012	Montreal Impact	2–1	Toronto FC	Olympic Stadium
	Ubiparipović 18'; Corradi (yellow card) 26'; Wenger 81'; Nyassi (yellow card) 82'	Report	Eckersley (yellow card) 29'; Harden (yellow card) 47' de Guzman (yellow card) 59'; Emory (red card) 65'; Koevermans 88'	Attendance: 23,120; Referee: Hilario Grajeda

April 14, 2012	Toronto FC	0–1	Chivas USA	BMO Field
	Lambe (yellow card) 66'; Koevermans (yellow card) 90+1'	Report	Smith (yellow card) 6'; Minda 31'; Bolaños (yellow card) 51'; Minda (yellow card) 65'	Attendance: 18,476; Referee: Mark Geiger

April 21, 2012	Toronto FC	2–3	Chicago Fire	BMO Field
	Cann (yellow card) 24'; Lambe 36'; Lambe 40' de Guzman (yellow card) 70'; Eckersley (yellow card) 80'	Report	Oduro 1'; Segares 41'; Nyarko 58'	Attendance: 19,255; Referee: Kevin Stott

April 28, 2012	Real Salt Lake	3–2	Toronto FC	Rio Tinto Stadium
	Beckerman 7'; Olave (yellow card) 17'; Wingert (yellow card) 27'; Eckersley 57' (o.g.); Morales (yellow card) 61'; Steele 90+3'	Report	Avila 48'; Henry 77', (yellow card) 78'; Frings (yellow card) 80'	Attendance: 17,629; Referee: Silviu Petrescu

May 5, 2012	Toronto FC	0–2	D.C. United	BMO Field
	Morgan (yellow card) 90'	Report	Pontius (yellow card) 52'; Pontius 55'; Salihi 75'	Attendance: 18,364; Referee: Mark Kadlecik

May 19, 2012	D.C. United	3–1	Toronto FC	RFK Stadium
	De Rosario 1'; Korb (yellow card) 28'; Salihi (yellow card) 31'; De Rosario 43'; Salihi 73'; De Rosario (yellow card) 90'	Report	Johnson (yellow card) 12'; Koevermans 71'	Attendance: 14,287; Referee: Geoff Gamble

May 26, 2012	Toronto FC	1–0	Philadelphia Union	BMO Field
	Morgan (yellow card) 30' de Guzman (yellow card) 43'; Koevermans 88'	Report	Gaddis (yellow card) 11'; Pajoy (yellow card) 29'	Attendance: 18,227; Referee: Juan Guzman

June 16, 2012	Sporting Kansas City	2–0	Toronto FC	Livestrong Sporting Park
	Sapong 18'; Júlio César 35'; Bunbury (yellow card) 82'	Report	Lambe (yellow card) 55'; Johnson (yellow card) 77'	Attendance: 20,488; Referee: Gavin Ward

June 20, 2012	Houston Dynamo	3–3	Toronto FC	BBVA Compass Stadium
	Boswell 20'; Bruin 73'; Bruin 90'	Report	Hall 13'; Koevermans 22'; Koevermans 45'; Frings (yellow card) 48'; Morgan (yellow card) 83'	Attendance: 21,423; Referee: Baldomero Toledo

June 23, 2012	Toronto FC	2–2	New England Revolution	BMO Field
	Koevermans 4'; Johnson 42'; Koevermans (yellow card) 49'; Henry (yellow card) 73'	Report	Alston (yellow card) 31'; Brettschneider 71'; Tierney (yellow card) 79'; Tierney 90+4'	Attendance: 18,877; Referee: Juan Guzman

June 27, 2012	Montreal Impact	0–3	Toronto FC	Saputo Stadium
	Camara (yellow card) 27'; Nyassi (yellow card) 85'; Bernier (yellow card) 90+5'	Report	Frings 52'; Johnson 72'; Koevermans 78'	Attendance: 14,412; Referee: Geoff Gamble

June 30, 2012	Toronto FC	1–1	New York Red Bulls	BMO Field
	Koevermans 6'; Dunfield (yellow card) 32'	Report	Solli 4'; Richards (yellow card) 47'	Attendance: 20,071; Referee: Ricardo Salazar

July 4, 2012	FC Dallas	1–1	Toronto FC	FC Dallas Stadium
	Loyd 5'	Report	Koevermans 31'; Eckersley (yellow card) 37'; Johnson (yellow card) 43'; Frings (yellow card) 79'	Attendance: 21,508; Referee: Carlos Rivera

July 8, 2012	Philadelphia Union	3–0	Toronto FC	PPL Park
	Gómez 34'; Adu 36'; Hoppenot 78'	Report	Johnson (yellow card) 56'; Frings (yellow card) 77'	Attendance: 18,393; Referee: Paul Ward

July 11, 2012	Toronto FC	3–2	Vancouver Whitecaps FC	BMO Field
	Silva (yellow card) 38'; Dunfield (yellow card) 63'; Silva 68'; Frings 72'; Dunfield 90+5'	Report	Mattocks 50'; Rochat (yellow card) 71'; Mattocks 90+1'	Attendance: 19,821; Referee: Fotis Bazakos

July 14, 2012	New England Revolution	0–1	Toronto FC	Gillette Stadium
	Joseph (yellow card) 84'	Report	Silva 8'; Lambe (yellow card) 28'; Dunfield (yellow card) 84'; Morgan (yellow card) 90+3'	Attendance: 12,180; Referee: Hilario Grajeda

July 18, 2012	Toronto FC	2–1	Colorado Rapids	BMO Field
	Johnson 51'; Wiedeman 67'	Report	Casey 23'; Larentowicz (yellow card) 90+2'	Attendance: 18,225; Referee: Ismail Elfath

July 28, 2012	Toronto FC	0–2	Houston Dynamo	BMO Field
	Henry (yellow card) 47'; Eckersley (yellow card) 53'	Report	Carr 45'; Ching 86'	Attendance: 19,652; Referee: Drew Fischer

August 4, 2012	Chicago Fire	2–1	Toronto FC	Toyota Park
	Friedrich (yellow card) 34'; Oduro (yellow card) 45'; Pappa 64'; Berry 84'	Report	Johnson 16'; Emory (yellow card) 40' (yellow-red card) 79'	Attendance: 15,757; Referee: Michael Kennedy

August 15, 2012	Toronto FC	2–2	Portland Timbers	BMO Field
	Hassli 57'; Silva 63'	Report	Zizzo 21'; Nagbe 82'; Mosquera (yellow card) 85'	Attendance: 18,773; Referee: Geoff Gamble

August 18, 2012	Toronto FC	0–1	Sporting Kansas City	BMO Field
	Frings (yellow card) 7'; Hassli (yellow card) 49'	Report	Collin (yellow card) 12'; Myers (yellow card) 60'; Kamara 83'	Attendance: 18,151; Referee: Jorge Gonzalez

August 22, 2012	Columbus Crew	2–1	Toronto FC	Columbus Crew Stadium
	Gaven 4'; Higuaín (yellow card) 20', (goal) 58'	Report	O'Dea (yellow card) 69'; Silva 71'; Morgan (yellow card) 90+3'	Attendance: 10,049; Referee: Sorin Stoica

August 25, 2012	Houston Dynamo	1–1	Toronto FC	BBVA Compass Stadium
	Bruin 21'; Carr (yellow card) 37'	Report	Dunfield (yellow card) 68'; Dunfield 85'	Attendance: 19,320; Referee: Paul Ward

September 1, 2012	Sporting Kansas City	2–1	Toronto FC	Livestrong Sporting Park
	Kamara (yellow card) 10'; Nagamura 60'; Rosell 87'	Report	Johnson 44'; Dunfield (yellow card) 59'	Attendance: 18,481; Referee: Allen Chapman

September 12, 2012	Toronto FC	1–2	Chicago Fire	BMO Field
	Morgan (yellow card) 66'; Hassli 79'; Avila (yellow card) 90'	Report	Fernández 13'; Rolfe 42'	Attendance: 14,623; Referee: Edvin Jurisevic

September 15, 2012	Toronto FC	1–1	Philadelphia Union	BMO Field
	Hassli (yellow card) 23'; Hassli 58'; Hall (yellow card) 84'	Report	M. Farfan (yellow card) 39'; Williams 85'; Carroll (yellow card) 90+3'	Attendance: 15,669; Referee: Silviu Petrescu

September 22, 2012	Los Angeles Galaxy	4–2	Toronto FC	Home Depot Center
	Juninho 11', 33'; Keane 36', 90+2'	Report	Johnson (yellow card) 30'; Dunfield 38'; O'Dea (yellow card) 79'; Morgan (yellow card) 84'; Silva 86'	Attendance: 27,000; Referee: Silvia Reyes

September 29, 2012	New York Red Bulls	4–1	Toronto FC	Red Bull Arena
	Holgersson 13'; Cooper 27', 88'; Henry 90+3'	Report	Johnson 6'; Maund (yellow card) 69'	Attendance: 25,017; Referee: Fotis Bazakos

October 6, 2012	Toronto FC	0–1	D.C. United	BMO Field
	Johnson (yellow card) 66'	Report	Saragosa (yellow card) 75'; Salihi 88' (yellow card) 90+2'	Attendance: 15,281; Referee: Armando Villarreal

October 20, 2012	Toronto FC	0–0	Montreal Impact	BMO Field
	Dunfield (yellow card) 39'	report	Arnaud (yellow card) 28'; Camara (yellow card) 73'; Nyassi (yellow card) 87'	Attendance: 16,151; Referee: Jose Carlos Rivero

October 28, 2012	Columbus Crew	2–1	Toronto FC	Columbus Crew Stadium
	Higuaín 17', 62'	Report	Andrew Wiedeman 27'; Terry Dunfield (yellow card) 61'	Attendance: 15,672; Referee: Drew Fischer

==== Eastern Conference table ====
Pos	Team	Pld	W	L	T	GF	GA	GD	Pts	Qualification
1	Sporting Kansas City	34	18	7	9	42	27	+15	63	Qualification for the conference semifinals
2	D.C. United	34	17	10	7	53	43	+10	58	Qualification for the conference semifinals
3	New York Red Bulls	34	16	9	9	57	46	+11	57	Qualification for the conference semifinals
4	Chicago Fire	34	17	11	6	46	41	+5	57	Qualification for the knockout round
5	Houston Dynamo	34	14	9	11	48	41	+7	53	Qualification for the knockout round
6	Columbus Crew	34	15	12	7	44	44	0	52	
7	Montreal Impact	34	12	16	6	45	51	−6	42	
8	Philadelphia Union	34	10	18	6	37	45	−8	36	
9	New England Revolution	34	9	17	8	39	44	−5	35	
10	Toronto FC	34	5	21	8	36	62	−26	23	

Source: MLS

==== Overall league table ====
Pos	Team	Pld	W	L	T	GF	GA	GD	Pts	
1	San Jose Earthquakes (S)	34	19	6	9	72	43	+29	66	Qualification for the CONCACAF Champions League
2	Sporting Kansas City (U)	34	18	7	9	42	27	+15	63	Qualification for the CONCACAF Champions League
3	D.C. United	34	17	10	7	53	43	+10	58	
4	New York Red Bulls	34	16	9	9	57	46	+11	57	
5	Real Salt Lake	34	17	11	6	46	35	+11	57	
6	Chicago Fire	34	17	11	6	46	41	+5	57	
7	Seattle Sounders FC	34	15	8	11	51	33	+18	56	
8	LA Galaxy (C)	34	16	12	6	59	47	+12	54	Qualification for the CONCACAF Champions League
9	Houston Dynamo	34	14	9	11	48	41	+7	53	Qualification for the CONCACAF Champions League
10	Columbus Crew	34	15	12	7	44	44	0	52	
11	Vancouver Whitecaps FC	34	11	13	10	35	41	−6	43	
12	Montreal Impact	34	12	16	6	45	51	−6	42	Qualification for the CONCACAF Champions League
13	FC Dallas	34	9	13	12	42	47	−5	39	
14	Colorado Rapids	34	11	19	4	44	50	−6	37	
15	Philadelphia Union	34	10	18	6	37	45	−8	36	
16	New England Revolution	34	9	17	8	39	44	−5	35	
17	Portland Timbers	34	8	16	10	34	56	−22	34	
18	Chivas USA	34	7	18	9	24	58	−34	30	
19	Toronto FC (V)	34	5	21	8	36	62	−26	23	

Source: MLS
Rules for classification: 1) points; 2) head-to-head record; 3) goal difference; 4) number of goals scored
(C) MLS Cup champions; (S) Supporters' Shield winners; (U) U.S. Open Cup winners; (V) Canadian Championship winners

==== Results summary ====
Overall								Home						Away					
Pld	Pts	W	L	D	GF	GA	GD	W	L	D	GF	GA	GD	W	L	D	GF	GA	GD
27	21	5	16	6	30	48	−18	3	7	3	13	21	−8	2	9	3	17	27	−10

Last updated: September 1, 2012
Source: 2012 Major League Soccer season
Pld = Matches played; Pts = Points; W = Matches won; D = Matches drawn; L = Matches lost; GF = Goals for; GA = Goals against; GD = Goal difference

==== Results by round ====
Round	1	2	3	4	5	6	7	8	9	10	11	12	13	14	15	16	17	18	19	20	21	22	23	24	25	26	27	28	29	30	31	32	33	34
Ground	A	H	H	A	H	H	A	H	A	H	A	A	H	A	H	A	A	H	A	H	H	A	H	H	A	A	A	H	H	A	A	H	H	A
Result	L	L	L	L	L	L	L	L	L	W	L	D	D	W	D	D	L	W	W	W	L	L	D	L	L	D	L	L	D	L	L	L	D	L

Updated to match(es) played on October 28, 2012. Source: Regular season matches
A = Away; H = Home; W = Win; D = Draw; L = Loss

=== Canadian Championship ===
May 2, 2012 Semi-final leg 1	Montreal Impact	0–0	Toronto FC	Olympic Stadium
		Report	Silva (yellow card) 90+5'	Attendance: 13,405; Referee: Paul Ward

May 9, 2012 Semi-final leg 2	Toronto FC	2–0	Montreal Impact	BMO Field
	Lambe 2'; Eckersley (red card) 16'; Johnson 38'; Cann (yellow card) 41'	Report	Nyassi (yellow card) 23'	Attendance: 15,016; Referee: David Gantar

May 16, 2012 Final leg 1	Vancouver Whitecaps FC	1–1	Toronto FC	BC Place
	Hassli 90+1'	Report	Hall (yellow card) 11'; Dunfield (yellow card) 49'; Johnson 66'	Attendance: 14,878; Referee: Drew Fischer

May 23, 2012 Final leg 2	Toronto FC	1–0	Vancouver Whitecaps FC	BMO Field
	Frings (yellow card) 31'; Morgan (yellow card) 48' de Guzman (red card) 57'; Lambe (yellow card) 75'; Lambe 83'; Henry (yellow card) 84'	Report	Bonjour (yellow card) 36'; Le Toux (yellow card) 45' (yellow-red card) 58'; Mattocks (yellow card) 89'	Attendance: 13,777; Referee: Silviu Petrescu

=== 2011–12 CONCACAF Champions League ===
March 7, 2012 Quarterfinal leg 1	Toronto FC (Canada)	2–2	(United States) Los Angeles Galaxy	Rogers Centre
	Johnson 12'; Silva 17'; Koevermans (yellow card) 56'; Frei (yellow card) 80'	Report	Magee 29'; Donovan 88'	Attendance: 47,658; Referee: Courtney Campbell

March 14, 2012 Quarterfinal leg 2	Los Angeles Galaxy (United States)	1–2	(Canada) Toronto FC	Home Depot Center
	Franklin (yellow card) 43'; Harden 55' (o.g.)	Report	Eckersley (yellow card) 19'; Johnson 34'; Aceval (yellow card) 63'; Soolsma 67'; Frings (yellow card) 90+2'	Attendance: 7,500; Referee: Roberto Moreno

March 28, 2012 Semifinal leg 1	Toronto FC (Canada)	1–1	(Mexico) Santos Laguna	BMO Field
	Koevermans (yellow card) 36'; Aceval 37'	Report	Gómez 60'; Crosas (yellow card) 76'; Mares (red card) 77'; Quintero (red card) 90+6'	Attendance: 18,950; Referee: Ricardo Salazar

April 4, 2012 Semifinal leg 2	Santos Laguna (Mexico)	6–2	(Canada) Toronto FC	Estadio Corona
	Gómez 31'; Gómez 45+3'; Rodríguez 56' (pen.); Peralta (yellow card) 61'; Rodríguez 64' (pen.); Peralta 66'; Ludueña 90+2'	Report	Plata 15'; Plata 43'; Aceval (yellow card) 55'	Attendance: 26,483; Referee: Jose Pineda

=== 2012–13 CONCACAF Champions League ===
August 1, 2012 Matchday 1	Toronto FC (Canada)	5–1	(El Salvador) Águila	BMO Field
	Silva 9'; Lambe 17'; Dunfield 40'; Lambe 48'; Johnson 58'; Wiedeman (yellow card) 86'	Report	Zelaya (yellow card) 25'; Pérez 37'	Attendance: 5,324; Referee: Javier Santos

August 28, 2012 Matchday 2	Toronto FC (Canada)	1–3	(Mexico) Santos Laguna	BMO Field
	O'Dea (yellow card) 15'; Dunfield (yellow card) 32'; Amarikwa 68'	Report	Peralta (yellow card) 15'; Quintero 49'; Ludueña 90'; Ramírez 90+2'	Attendance: 10,951; Referee: Walter Lopez

September 25, 2012 Matchday 3	Águila (El Salvador)	0–3	(Canada) Toronto FC	Estadio Juan Francisco Barraza
	Romero (yellow card) 46'; Soto (yellow card) 78'	Report	Amarikwa 16'; Dunfield 40'; Lambe (yellow card) 58'; Dunfield 86'	Attendance: 319

October 24, 2012 Matchday 4	Santos Laguna (Mexico)	1–0	(Canada) Toronto FC	Estadio Corona
	Gómez 73'	Report	Dunfield (yellow card) 33'; Morgan (yellow card) 35'; Hall (yellow card) 56'	Attendance: 7,478

Team	Pld	W	D	L	GF	GA	GD	Pts	Qualification	SAN	TOR	ÁGU
(Mexico) Santos Laguna	4	4	0	0	13	1	+12	12	Advance to championship round		1–0	5–0
(Canada) Toronto FC	4	2	0	2	9	5	+4	6		1–3		5–1
(El Salvador) Águila	4	0	0	4	1	17	−16	0		0–4	0–3	

Legend: Blue = home team win; Yellow = draw; Red = away team win.

=== Mid-season friendly ===
July 21, 2012 2012 World Football Challenge	Toronto FC	1–1	Liverpool	Rogers Centre
	Amarikwa 58'; Williams (yellow card) 88'	Report	Morgan 69'	Attendance: 33,087; Referee: Paul Ward

=== Overall ===
==== Overall record and club statistics ====
Games played	46 (34 Major League Soccer, 4 Canadian Championship, 8 CONCACAF Champions League)
Games won	10 (5 Major League Soccer, 2 Canadian Championship, 3 CONCACAF Champions League)
Games drawn	12 (8 Major League Soccer, 2 Canadian Championship, 2 CONCACAF Champions League)
Games lost	24 (21 Major League Soccer, 3 CONCACAF Champions League)
Goals scored	56 (36 Major League Soccer, 4 Canadian Championship, 16 CONCACAF Champions League)
Goals conceded	78 (62 Major League Soccer, 1 Canadian Championship, 15 CONCACAF Champions League)
Goal difference	-22 (-26 Major League Soccer, 3 Canadian Championship, 1 CONCACAF Champions League)
Clean sheets	8
Yellow cards	76
Red cards	4
Worst discipline	(United States) Logan Emory (1 (yellow card) (yellow-red card) , 1 (red card) )
Best result(s)	W 5 – 1 (H) v Águila – CONCACAF Champions League – August 1, 2012
Worst result(s)	L 2 – 6 (A) v Santos Laguna – CONCACAF Champions League – April 4, 2012
Most appearances	(Jamaica) Ryan Johnson with 43 appearances
Top scorer(s)	(Jamaica) Ryan Johnson (12 goals)
Points	Overall: 42/138 (30.43%)

Last updated: October 28, 2012
Source: Competitions

==== Overall record by competition ====
Competition	First match	Last match	Record							
Competition	First match	Last match	G	W	L	T	Win %	GF	GA	GD
Major League Soccer	March 17	October 28	34	5	21	8	14.71	36	62	−26
Canadian Championship	May 2	May 23	4	2	0	2	50.00	4	1	+3
2011–12 CONCACAF Champions League	March 7	April 4	4	1	1	2	25.00	7	10	−3
2012–13 CONCACAF Champions League	August 1	October 24	4	2	2	0	50.00	9	5	+4
Total			46	10	24	12	21.74	56	78	–22

== Squad information ==
=== Squad and statistics ===
==== Squad, appearances and goals ====
No.	Pos	Nat	Player	Total		Major League Soccer		Canadian Championship		2011–12 Champions League		2012–13 Champions League	
No.	Pos	Nat	Player	Apps	Goals	Apps	Goals	Apps	Goals	Apps	Goals	Apps	Goals
2	DF	(United States) USA	Logan Emory	25	0	19+4	0	0+1	0	0+0	0	1+0	0
4	DF	(Canada) CAN	Doneil Henry	24	1	11+7	1	4+0	0	0+1	0	1+0	0
5	DF	(Canada) CAN	Ashtone Morgan	40	0	27+3	0	4+0	0	4+0	0	2+0	0
8	MF	(United States) USA	Eric Avila	28	1	16+8	1	4+0	0	0+0	0	0+0	0
9	FW	(Jamaica) JAM	Ryan Johnson	41	12	31+0	7	4+0	2	4+0	2	2+0	1
11	MF	(United States) USA	Luis Silva	37	7	22+8	5	0+2	0	2+1	1	2+0	1
12	DF	(Canada) CAN	Adrian Cann	14	0	8+2	0	4+0	0	0+0	0	0+0	0
13	FW	(Canada) CAN	Keith Makubuya	1	0	0+1	0	0+0	0	0+0	0	0+0	0
14	FW	(Netherlands) NED	Danny Koevermans	20	9	12+4	9	0+1	0	3+0	0	0+0	0
15	MF	(Canada) CAN	Matt Stinson	6	0	1+3	0	0+0	0	0+2	0	0+0	0
16	MF	(Canada) CAN	Oscar Cordon	0	0	0+0	0	0+0	0	0+0	0	0+0	0
18	FW	(United States) USA	Quincy Amarikwa	13	1	6+5	0	0+0	0	0+0	0	0+2	1
19	MF	(Bermuda) BER	Reggie Lambe	35	6	22+5	2	4+0	2	1+2	0	1+0	2
20	DF	(United States) USA	Ty Harden	9	0	5+0	0	0+0	0	4+0	0	0+0	0
21	DF	(United States) USA	Aaron Maund	19	0	9+6	0	0+0	0	0+3	0	0+1	0
22	MF	(Germany) GER	Torsten Frings	27	2	20+0	2	3+0	0	2+0	0	2+0	0
23	MF	(Canada) CAN	Terry Dunfield	40	4	30+0	3	2+2	0	3+1	0	2+0	1
24	GK	(Switzerland) SUI	Stefan Frei	1	0	0+0	0	0+0	0	1+0	0	0+0	0
25	DF	(United States) USA	Jeremy Hall	27	1	19+4	1	2+1	0	0+0	0	0+1	0
27	DF	(England) ENG	Richard Eckersley	42	0	32+1	0	1+2	0	4+0	0	2+0	0
29	FW	(France) FRA	Eric Hassli	8	1	7+0	1	0+0	0	0+0	0	1+0	0
30	GK	(Serbia) SRB	Miloš Kocić	36	0	28+0	0	4+0	0	3+0	0	1+0	0
31	DF	(Jamaica) JAM	Dicoy Williams	2	0	1+1	0	0+0	0	0+0	0	0+0	0
32	FW	(United States) USA	Andrew Wiedeman	17	2	7+8	2	0+0	0	0+0	0	2+0	0
37	FW	(Canada) CAN	Nicholas Lindsay	0	0	0+0	0	0+0	0	0+0	0	0+0	0
40	GK	(Canada) CAN	Quillan Roberts	0	0	0+0	0	0+0	0	0+0	0	0+0	0
41	GK	(Bermuda) BER	Freddy Hall	7	0	6+0	0	0+0	0	0+0	0	1+0	0
48	DF	(Republic of Ireland) IRL	Darren O'Dea	10	0	9+0	0	0+0	0	0+0	0	1+0	0
Players who left the club during the season: (Statistics shown are the appearances made and goals scored while at Toronto FC)
3	DF	(Chile) CHI	Miguel Aceval	10	1	5+0	0	1+0	0	4+0	1	0+0	0
6	MF	(Canada) CAN	Julian de Guzman	23	0	11+5	0	4+0	0	3+0	0	0+0	0
7	FW	(Ecuador) ECU	Joao Plata (on loan to LDU Quito)	17	2	7+3	0	3+0	0	3+1	2	0+0	0
18	FW	(Netherlands) NED	Nick Soolsma	15	1	3+6	0	0+3	0	3+0	1	0+0	0
33	MF	(El Salvador) ESA	Efrain Burgos, Jr.	2	0	0+2	0	0+0	0	0+0	0	0+0	0

Updated to match played September 1, 2012
Source: Toronto FC

==== Top scorers ====
Includes all competitive matches. The list is sorted by shirt number when total goals are equal.

Ran	No.	Pos	Nationality	Name	Major League Soccer	Canadian Championship	2011-12 Champions League	2012-13 Champions League	Total
1	9	FW	Jamaica	Ryan Johnson	6	2	2	1	11
2	14	FW	Netherlands	Danny Koevermans	9	0	0	0	9
3	11	MF	United States	Luis Silva	4	0	1	1	6
3	19	MF	Bermuda	Reggie Lambe	2	2	0	2	6
5	23	MF	Canada	Terry Dunfield	2	0	0	1	3
6	7	FW	Ecuador	Joao Plata	0	0	2	0	2
6	22	MF	Germany	Torsten Frings	2	0	0	0	2
8	3	DF	Chile	Miguel Aceval	0	0	1	0	1
8	4	DF	Canada	Doneil Henry	1	0	0	0	1
8	8	MF	United States	Eric Avila	1	0	0	0	1
8	18	FW	United States	Quincy Amarikwa	1	0	0	0	1
8	18	FW	Netherlands	Nick Soolsma	0	0	1	0	1
8	25	DF	United States	Jeremy Hall	1	0	0	0	1
8	29	FW	France	Eric Hassli	1	0	0	0	1
8	32	FW	United States	Andrew Wiedeman	1	0	0	0	1
				TOTALS	30	4	7	6	47

Last updated: September 1, 2012
Source: Toronto FC

==== Top assists ====
Includes all competitive matches. The list is sorted by shirt number when total goals are equal.

Ran	No.	Pos	Nationality	Name	Major League Soccer	Canadian Championship	2011-12 Champions League	2012-13 Champions League	Total
1	5	DF	Canada	Ashtone Morgan	5	0	0	2	7
2	9	FW	Jamaica	Ryan Johnson	4	1	1	0	6
3	18	FW	Netherlands	Nick Soolsma	2	1	2	0	5
4	6	MF	Canada	Julian de Guzman	3	1	0	0	4
4	8	MF	United States	Luis Silva	2	0	0	2	4
4	22	MF	Germany	Torsten Frings	2	0	1	1	4
7	3	DF	Chile	Miguel Aceval	2	0	0	0	2
7	8	MF	United States	Eric Avila	2	0	0	0	2
7	14	FW	Netherlands	Danny Koevermans	2	0	0	0	2
7	19	MF	Bermuda	Reggie Lambe	1	1	0	0	2
7	27	DF	England	Richard Eckersley	2	0	0	0	2
7	29	FW	France	Eric Hassli	2	0	0	0	2
13	4	DF	Canada	Doneil Henry	1	0	0	0	1
13	15	MF	Canada	Matt Stinson	1	0	0	0	1
13	18	FW	United States	Quincy Amarikwa	1	0	0	0	1
13	25	DF	United States	Jeremy Hall	1	0	0	0	1
13	48	DF	Ireland	Darren O'Dea	1	0	0	0	1
				TOTALS	34	4	4	5	47

Last updated: September 1, 2012
Source: Toronto FC

==== Clean sheets ====
Includes all competitive matches. The list is sorted by shirt number when total clean sheets are equal.

Ran	No.	Pos	Nationality	Name	Major League Soccer	Canadian Championship	2011-12 Champions League	2012-13 Champions League	Total
1	30	GK	Serbia	Miloš Kocić	3	3	0	0	6
2	24	GK	Switzerland	Stefan Frei	0	0	0	0	0
2	40	GK	Canada	Quillan Roberts	0	0	0	0	0
2	41	GK	Bermuda	Freddy Hall	0	0	0	0	0
				TOTALS	2	3	0	0	5

Last updated: September 1, 2012
Source: Toronto FC

==== Disciplinary record ====
Includes all competitive matches. The list is sorted by shirt number when total cards are equal.

R	No.	Pos	Nat	Name	Major League Soccer			Canadian Championship			2011-12 Champions League			2012-13 Champions League			Total		
R	No.	Pos	Nat	Name	Yellow card	(yellow card) (yellow-red card)	Red card	Yellow card	(yellow card) (yellow-red card)	Red card	Yellow card	(yellow card) (yellow-red card)	Red card	Yellow card	(yellow card) (yellow-red card)	Red card	Yellow card	(yellow card) (yellow-red card)	Red card
1	2	DF	(United States)	Logan Emory	0	1	1	0	0	0	0	0	0	0	0	0	0	1	1
2	27	DF	(England)	Richard Eckersley	4	0	0	0	0	1	1	0	0	0	0	0	5	0	1
3	6	MF	(Canada)	Julian de Guzman	4	0	0	0	0	1	0	0	0	0	0	0	4	0	1
4	22	MF	(Germany)	Torsten Frings	5	0	0	1	0	0	1	0	0	0	0	0	7	0	0
4	23	MF	(Canada)	Terry Dunfield	5	0	0	1	0	0	0	0	0	1	0	0	7	0	0
6	5	DF	(Canada)	Ashtone Morgan	5	0	0	1	0	0	0	0	0	0	0	0	6	0	0
7	4	DF	(Canada)	Doneil Henry	3	0	0	1	0	0	0	0	0	0	0	0	4	0	0
7	9	FW	(Jamaica)	Ryan Johnson	4	0	0	0	0	0	0	0	0	0	0	0	4	0	0
7	14	FW	(Netherlands)	Danny Koevermans	2	0	0	0	0	0	2	0	0	0	0	0	4	0	0
7	19	MF	(Bermuda)	Reggie Lambe	3	0	0	1	0	0	0	0	0	0	0	0	4	0	0
11	3	DF	(Chile)	Miguel Aceval	0	0	0	0	0	0	2	0	0	0	0	0	2	0	0
11	11	MF	(United States)	Luis Silva	1	0	0	1	0	0	0	0	0	0	0	0	2	0	0
11	12	DF	(Canada)	Adrian Cann	1	0	0	1	0	0	0	0	0	0	0	0	2	0	0
11	48	DF	(Republic of Ireland)	Darren O'Dea	1	0	0	0	0	0	0	0	0	1	0	0	2	0	0
15	20	DF	(United States)	Ty Harden	1	0	0	0	0	0	0	0	0	0	0	0	1	0	0
15	21	DF	(United States)	Aaron Maund	1	0	0	0	0	0	0	0	0	0	0	0	1	0	0
15	24	GK	(Switzerland)	Stefan Frei	0	0	0	0	0	0	1	0	0	0	0	0	1	0	0
15	25	DF	(United States)	Jeremy Hall	0	0	0	1	0	0	0	0	0	0	0	0	1	0	0
15	29	FW	(France)	Eric Hassli	1	0	0	0	0	0	0	0	0	0	0	0	1	0	0
15	32	FW	(United States)	Andrew Wiedeman	0	0	0	0	0	0	0	0	0	1	0	0	1	0	0
				TOTALS	41	1	1	8	0	2	7	0	0	3	0	0	60	1	3

Last updated: September 1, 2012
Source: Toronto FC

=== Player movement ===
==== Transfers ====
===== In =====
Date	Player	Position	Previous club	Fee/notes	Ref
November 29, 2011	(United States) Jeremy Hall	DF	(United States) FC Dallas	Acquired for 2nd round 2013 SuperDraft pick	
December 7, 2011	(Bermuda) Reggie Lambe	MF	(England) Ipswich Town	Free Transfer	
January 11, 2012	(Ecuador) Joao Plata	FW	(Ecuador) LDU Quito	Undisclosed	
January 12, 2012	(United States) Luis Silva	MF	(United States) UC Santa Barbara	1st round 2012 SuperDraft pick	
January 12, 2011	(United States) Aaron Maund	DF	(United States) University of Notre Dame	1st round 2012 SuperDraft pick	
January 26, 2012	(England) Richard Eckersley	DF	(England) Burnley	Free Transfer	
January 26, 2012	(Ecuador) Geovanny Caicedo	DF	(Ecuador) LDU Quito	Undisclosed	
January 30, 2012	(Chile) Miguel Aceval	DF	(Chile) Universidad de Concepción	Undisclosed	
March 13, 2012	(United States) Logan Emory	DF	Puerto Rico Islanders	Free Transfer	
March 21, 2012	(El Salvador) Efrain Burgos, Jr.	MF	(United States) California Polytechnic State University	3rd round 2011 SuperDraft pick	
April 10, 2012	(Canada) Quillan Roberts	GK	(Canada) TFC Academy	Graduated From Academy	
July 13, 2012	(United States) Andrew Wiedeman	FW	(United States) FC Dallas	Traded for Julian de Guzman	
July 20, 2012	(France) Eric Hassli	FW	(Canada) Vancouver Whitecaps FC	Acquired for 1st round 2014 SuperDraft pick & an International Roster Spot	
July 21, 2012	(United States) Quincy Amarikwa	FW	(United States) New York Red Bulls	Acquired for Conditional draft pick	
July 31, 2012	(Bermuda) Freddy Hall	GK	(England) Northampton Town	Free Transfer	
August 3, 2012	(Republic of Ireland) Darren O'Dea	DF	(Scotland) Celtic	Free Transfer	

===== Out =====
Date	Player	Position	Destination club	Fee/notes	Ref
November 23, 2011	(United States) Kyle Davies	DF	(United States) Orlando City SC	Waived	
November 23, 2011	(United States) Matt Gold	MF	(United States) San Antonio Scorpions	Waived	
November 23, 2011	(France) Léandre Griffit	MF		Waived	
November 23, 2011	(Curaçao) Javier Martina	FW	(Netherlands) FC Dordrecht	Waived	
November 23, 2011	(Panama) Demitrius Omphroy	DF	(Philippines) Global F.C.	Waived	
November 23, 2011	(Guadeloupe) Eddy Viator	DF	(Malaysia) Felda United F.C.	Waived	
November 23, 2011	(Canada) Gianluca Zavarise	MF		Waived	
December 5, 2011	(South Africa) Danleigh Borman	DF	(United States) New England Revolution	Selected in Re-Entry Draft	
December 29, 2011	(United States) Nathan Sturgis	MF	(United States) Houston Dynamo	Traded for a conditional pick in the 2014 MLS SuperDraft	
January 19, 2012	(Belgium) Mikael Yourassowsky	DF		Waived	
January 20, 2012	(England) Andy Iro	DF	(England) Stevenage F.C.	Contract Expired	
January 20, 2012	(United States) Peri Marošević	FW	(Croatia) NK Junak Sinj	Contract Expired	
February 28, 2012	(Netherlands) Elbekay Bouchiba	MF		Waived	
March 9, 2012	(Ecuador) Geovanny Caicedo	DF	(Ecuador) Deportivo Cuenca	Waived	
June 28, 2012	(El Salvador) Efrain Burgos, Jr.	MF		Waived	
July 11, 2012	(Netherlands) Nick Soolsma	MF	(Netherlands) Excelsior	Released	
July 13, 2012	(Canada) Julian de Guzman	MF	(United States) FC Dallas	Traded for Andrew Wiedeman	
July 26, 2012	(Chile) Miguel Aceval	DF	(Chile) Huachipato	Released	

==== Loans ====
===== Out =====
Date	Player	Position	Loaned to	Fee/notes	Ref
July 11, 2012	(Ecuador) Joao Plata	FW	(Ecuador) LDU Quito	End of season loan deal	

== Recognition ==
=== MLS Player of the Week ===
Week	Player	Week's Statline
17	(Netherlands) Danny Koevermans	2 Goals

=== MLS Goal of the Week ===
Week	Player	Goal	Report
2	(Jamaica) Ryan Johnson	62'	Johnson GOTW

=== MLS Team of the Week ===
Week	Player/Manager	Position	Report
8	(United States) Eric Avila	Midfield	MLS Team of the Week: 8
16	(Netherlands) Danny Koevermans	Forward	MLS Team of the Week: 16
17	(Canada) Ashtone Morgan	Defender	MLS Team of the Week: 17
17	(Germany) Torsten Frings	Midfield	MLS Team of the Week: 17
17	(Netherlands) Danny Koevermans	Forward	MLS Team of the Week: 17
17	(England) Paul Mariner	Manager	MLS Team of the Week: 17
19	(Serbia) Miloš Kocić	Goalkeeper	MLS Team of the Week: 19
19	(United States) Luis Silva	Midfield	MLS Team of the Week: 19
19	(England) Paul Mariner	Manager	MLS Team of the Week: 19

== Miscellany ==
=== Allocation ranking ===
Toronto is in the No. 4 position in the MLS Allocation Ranking. The allocation ranking is the mechanism used to determine which MLS club has first priority to acquire a U.S. National Team player who signs with MLS after playing abroad, or a former MLS player who returns to the league after having gone to a club abroad for a transfer fee. A ranking can be traded, provided that part of the compensation received in return is another club's ranking.

=== International roster slots ===
It is believed that Toronto FC has 10 MLS International Roster Slots. Each club in Major League Soccer is allocated 8 international roster spots, which can be traded. Toronto FC acquired one slot from San Jose Earthquakes on July 14, 2011. TFC has use of this spot through the end of the 2012 season, at which point it reverts to San Jose. Earlier, Toronto FC had acquired an additional spot from San Jose on July 14, 2008 for use through the end of the 2013 season.

=== Future draft pick trades ===
Acquired
Year	Draft	Round	Traded from	Ref.
2013	MLS Supplemental Draft	3rd	Colorado Rapids	
2014	MLS SuperDraft	Conditional	Houston Dynamo	
		^{[Note A]}	Los Angeles Galaxy	

Traded
Year	Draft	Round	Traded to	Ref.
2013	MLS SuperDraft	2nd	FC Dallas	
		^{[Note A]}	Vancouver Whitecaps FC	

== Club ==
=== Management team ===
Position	Staff
Head Coach & Technical Director	Paul Mariner
Technical Manager	Bob de Klerk
Director of Team and Player Operations	Earl Cochrane

Last updated: June 7, 2012
Source: Toronto FC

=== First team staff ===
Position	Staff
Assistant Coach	Jason Bent
Assistant Coach	Jim Brennan
Goalkeeping Coach	Stewart Kerr
Video Analyst	Shel Brodsgaard
Manager, Team Operations	Corey Wray
Coordinator, Media Relations	Mike Masaro
Team Physician	Dr. Ira Smith
Head Athletic Therapist	Carmelo Lobue
Assistant Athletic Therapist	Shawn Jeffers
Massage Therapist and Acupuncturist	Marcelo Casal
Strength & Conditioning	Nick Milonas
Equipment Manager	Malcolm Phillips
Assistant Equipment Manager	Sacha De Almeida

Last updated: May 23, 2012
Source: Toronto FC

== Footnotes ==
^A: These trades included "future considerations", which may or may not include draft picks.
