= 2012 Houston Dynamo season =

Houston Dynamo
2012 season
- Chairman: Philip Anschutz
- Manager: Dominic Kinnear
- Major League Soccer: 8th
- MLS Cup Playoffs: Runners-up
- U.S. Open Cup: Third round
- Champions League: TBD
- Top goalscorer: League: Will Bruin (12); All: Will Bruin (16)
- Highest home attendance: 22,039 (seven matches)
- Lowest home attendance: 18,452 vs. Real Salt Lake (September 6, 2012)
- Average home league attendance: 20,985
Home colors	Away colors	Third colors

The 2012 Houston Dynamo season was the seventh season of the team's existence and the first season in their new soccer-specific stadium, BBVA Compass Stadium. The Dynamo entered the season as both the defending MLS Cup runners-up and Texas Derby winners. The club also played in the 2012–13 CONCACAF Champions League.

Houston would finish the season fifth in the Eastern Conference, making a run back to MLS Cup by defeating Chicago Fire in the wild-card round, upsetting top-seeded Sporting Kansas City in the conference semifinals, and seeing off D.C. United in the conference finals. The 2011 runners-up came up short against defending champions LA Galaxy in the final by a 3–1 scoreline. As of 2024, this is the Dynamo's most recent MLS Cup appearance.

== Squad information ==
=== Club roster ===
As of March 9, 2012.

No.	Position	Nation	Player
1	GK	USA	Tally Hall
3	FW	USA	Calen Carr
4	DF	JAM	Jermaine Taylor
5	MF	USA	Warren Creavalle
6	MF	USA	Nathan Sturgis
7	MF	USA	Colin Clark
8	DF	USA	Kofi Sarkodie (GA)
9	FW	SEN	Macoumba Kandji
10	MF	JAM	Je-Vaughn Watson
11	MF	USA	Brad Davis
12	FW	USA	Will Bruin (GA)
14	FW	USA	Colin Rolfe
15	FW	USA	Cam Weaver
16	MF	SCO	Adam Moffat
17	MF	BRA	Luiz Camargo
18	MF	USA	Josue Soto (HGP)
19	MF	USA	Alex Dixon (HGP)
20	DF	USA	Geoff Cameron
22	FW	USA	Brian Ownby
24	GK	USA	Tyler Deric (HGP)
25	FW	USA	Brian Ching
26	MF	USA	Corey Ashe
31	DF	CAN	André Hainault
32	DF	USA	Bobby Boswell

== Player movement ==
=== Transfers ===
==== In ====
Date	Player	Position	Previous club	Fee/notes	Ref
December 6, 2011	(Brazil) Luiz Camargo	MF	(Brazil) Paraná Clube	Undisclosed	
December 28, 2011	(United States) Nathan Sturgis	MF	(Canada) Toronto FC	Acquired for a 2014 draft pick	
February 8, 2012	(Senegal) Macoumba Kandji	MF	(United States) Colorado Rapids	Acquired for a 2014 draft pick	
February 16, 2012	(United States) Brian Ching	FW	(Canada) Montreal Impact	Acquired for a 2013 draft pick	
June 7, 2012	(Honduras) Oscar Boniek Garcia	MF	(Honduras) Olimpia	Undisclosed	
August 8, 2012	(United States) Ricardo Clark	MF	(Germany) Eintracht Frankfurt	Free Agent / Undisclosed	
August 29, 2012	(England) Giles Barnes	MF	(England) Doncaster Rovers	Undisclosed	

==== Out ====
Date	Player	Position	Destination club	Fee/notes	Ref
November 23, 2011	(United States) Brian Ching	FW	(Canada) Montreal Impact	Selected in the Expansion Draft	
December 12, 2011	(United States) Hunter Freeman	DF	(United States) Colorado Rapids	Selected in the Re-Entry Draft	
January 20, 2012	(United States) Danny Cruz	MF	(United States) D.C. United	Traded for allocation money	
August 8, 2012	(United States) Geoff Cameron	CB/MF	(England) Stoke City F.C.	Sold – approximately $2.5 million	

=== SuperDraft ===
Round/Pick	Player	Position	College
1/18	Colin Rolfe	Forward	Louisville
2/37	Warren Creavalle	Defender	Central Florida

=== Supplemental draft ===
Round/Pick	Player	Position	From
1/7	Brian Ownby	Forward	Virginia
1/18	Eder Arreola	Midfielder	UCLA
4/75	Daniel Roberts	Midfielder	UNC Wilmington

== Club staff ==
Position	Staff
Head Coach	(United States) Dominic Kinnear
Assistant Coach	(United States) Steve Ralston
Assistant Coach	(United States) Wade Barrett
Goalkeeper Coach	(United States) Tim Hanley
Athletic Trainer	(United States) Theron Enns
Manager, Team Operations	(United States) Nick Kowba
Equipment Manager	(United States) Michael Porter

Last updated: 9 February 2012

=== Other information ===
Chairman	(United States) Philip Anschutz
Ground (capacity and dimensions)	BBVA Compass Stadium (22,039 / N/A)

Source: Houston Dynamo

== Regular-season standings ==
Eastern Conference

Pos	Team	Pld	W	L	T	GF	GA	GD	Pts	Qualification
1	Sporting Kansas City	34	18	7	9	42	27	+15	63	Qualification for the conference semifinals
2	D.C. United	34	17	10	7	53	43	+10	58	Qualification for the conference semifinals
3	New York Red Bulls	34	16	9	9	57	46	+11	57	Qualification for the conference semifinals
4	Chicago Fire	34	17	11	6	46	41	+5	57	Qualification for the knockout round
5	Houston Dynamo	34	14	9	11	48	41	+7	53	Qualification for the knockout round
6	Columbus Crew	34	15	12	7	44	44	0	52	
7	Montreal Impact	34	12	16	6	45	51	−6	42	
8	Philadelphia Union	34	10	18	6	37	45	−8	36	
9	New England Revolution	34	9	17	8	39	44	−5	35	
10	Toronto FC	34	5	21	8	36	62	−26	23	

Source: MLS

== Match results ==
Win Tie Loss

=== Preseason ===
Kickoff times are in CDT.

January 28	Houston Dynamo	3–0	Dynamo Academy	Houston Amateur Sports Park, Houston
10:30am	Clark 54'; Dixon 57'; Rolfe 82'	Report

February 1	Houston Dynamo	4–0	San Jacinto College	Houston Amateur Sports Park, Houston
10:30am	Sturgis 31'; Escobar 55'; Bruin 56'; Moffat 66'	Report

February 4	Houston Dynamo	4–0	Houston Baptist University	Houston Amateur Sports Park, Houston
10:30am	Ownby 31' 80'; Aseweh 37'; Arreola 67'	Report

February 8	Houston Dynamo	2–0	Montreal Impact	The Home Depot Center, Carson
12:30pm	Clark 67'; Weaver 83'	Report

February 10	Los Angeles Galaxy	0–1	Houston Dynamo	The Home Depot Center, Carson
12:30pm		Report	Sturgis 68'

February 12	Houston Dynamo	0–2	Portland Timbers	The Home Depot Center, Carson
12:30pm		Report	Jewsbury 63'; Marcelin 86'

February 14	San Jose Earthquakes	2–2	Houston Dynamo	Oxnard College, Ventura County
1:00pm	Wondolowski 30'; Ampaipitakwong 78'	Report	Kandji 5'; Bruin 51'

February 18	Houston Dynamo	4–0	Southern Methodist University	Houston Amateur Sports Park, Houston
10:30am	Ownby 23'; Bruin 43'; Sato 44'; Rolfe 49'	Report

February 20	Houston Dynamo	9–0	Dynamo Academy	Houston Amateur Sports Park, Houston
10:30am	Bruin 7'; Dixon 9'; Clark 41'; Sato 47'; Weaver 54' 57'; Ownby 67'; Rolfe 70'; Kandji 84'	Report

February 24 Pro Soccer Classic; Group stage	Sporting Kansas City	0–0	Houston Dynamo	ESPN Wide World of Sports Complex, Lake Buena Vista
5:00pm		Report	Moffat (yellow card) 81'

February 26 Pro Soccer Classic; Group stage	Vancouver Whitecaps FC	1–0	Houston Dynamo	ESPN Wide World of Sports Complex, Lake Buena Vista
12:00pm	Le Toux 15' (pen.); Harvey (yellow card) 54'	Report	Deric (yellow card) 28'; Creavalle (yellow card) 54'

February 29 Pro Soccer Classic; Group stage	Houston Dynamo	1–1	Montreal Impact	ESPN Wide World of Sports Complex, Lake Buena Vista
7:00pm	Moffat (yellow card) 20'; Ashe (yellow card) 34'; Hainault (yellow card) 41'; Bruin 49'	Report	Wahl (yellow card) 22'; Bernier 56'; Warner (red card) 88'

March 3 Pro Soccer Classic; Third-place match	Houston Dynamo	0–1	FC Dallas	ESPN Wide World of Sports Complex, Lake Buena Vista
5:00pm	Watson (yellow card) 52'; Boswell (yellow card) 52' (red card) 88'	Report	Shea 9' (pen.); Jacobson (yellow card) 45'; Enriquez (yellow card) 78'

=== Results summary ===
Overall								Home						Away					
Pld	W	D	L	GF	GA	GD	Pts	W	D	L	GF	GA	GD	W	D	L	GF	GA	GD
34	16	9	9	53	44	+9	57	12	6	0	34	13	+21	4	3	9	19	31	−12

Last updated: October 6, 2012.
Source: Competitive Matches

=== Results by rounds ===
Round	1	2	3	4	5	6	7	8	9	10	11	12	13	14	15	16	17	18	19	20	21	22	23	24	25	26	27	28	29	30	31	32	33	34
Result	W	W	L	T	T	L	L	W	T	T	W	L	W	T	L	W	T	T	W	W	W	W	W	L	T	T	L	W	T	L	W	T	W	L

Updated to match(es) played on October 6, 2012. Source: HoustonDynamo.com
W = Win; L = Loss; T = Tie

=== MLS regular season ===
Kickoff times are in CDT.

March 11 Match 1	Chivas USA	0–1	Houston Dynamo	Carson, CA
6:00pm		Report	Watson (yellow card) 52'; Hainault 90+2'	Stadium: The Home Depot Center; Attendance: 14,464; Referee: Silviu Petrescu

March 17 Match 2	San Jose Earthquakes	0–1	Houston Dynamo	San Francisco, CA
4:00pm	Lenhart (yellow card) 50'	Report	Davis 14' (pen.); Taylor (yellow card) 53'; Cameron (yellow card) 63'; Hainault (yellow card) 83'	Stadium: AT&T Park; Attendance: 21,816; Referee: Chris Penso

March 23 Match 3	Seattle Sounders FC	2–0	Houston Dynamo	Seattle, WA
9:00pm	Estrada 23'; Evans 27' (pen.); Fernández (yellow card) 83'	Report	Moffat (yellow card) 35'; Davis (yellow card) 78'	Stadium: CenturyLink Field; Attendance: 38,304; Referee: Baldomero Toledo

April 15 Match 4	Chicago Fire	1–1	Houston Dynamo	Bridgeview, IL
6:00pm	Pause 27'; Pappa (yellow card) 49'; Nyarko (yellow card) 60'	Report	Bruin 24'	Stadium: Toyota Park; Attendance: 10,489; Referee: Geoff Gamble

April 21 Match 5	Columbus Crew	2–2	Houston Dynamo	Columbus, OH
6:30pm	Tchani (yellow card) 17'; Hainault 63' (o.g.); Gaven 74'	Report	Hainault (yellow card) 55'; Bruin 59'; Ching 81'	Stadium: Crew Stadium; Attendance: 10,479; Referee: Chris Penso

April 28 Match 6	D.C. United	3–2	Houston Dynamo	Washington, D.C.
6:30pm	Maicon Santos 11', 70'; Cruz (yellow card) 32'; De Rosario 54', (yellow card) 63'	Report	Bruin 50', 59'; Ashe (yellow card) 64'; Carr (yellow card) 90+3'	Stadium: RFK Stadium; Attendance: 13,975; Referee: Juan Guzman

May 9 Match 7	New York Red Bulls	1–0	Houston Dynamo	Harrison, NJ
6:00pm	Cooper 7', (yellow card) 45'; Lade (yellow card) 56'; McCarty (yellow card) 59'	Report		Stadium: Red Bull Arena; Attendance: 11,315; Referee: Sorin Stoica

May 12 Match 8	Houston Dynamo	1–0	D.C. United	Houston, TX
3:30pm	Taylor (yellow card) 46'; Davis 67'; Moffat (yellow card) 90+2'	Report	Wolff (yellow card) 74'	Stadium: BBVA Compass Stadium; Attendance: 22,039; Referee: Hilario Grajeda

May 15 Match 9	Houston Dynamo	0–0	Portland Timbers	Houston, TX
7:30pm		Report	Boyd (yellow card) 90+2'	Stadium: BBVA Compass Stadium; Attendance: 22,039; Referee: Chris Penso

May 19 Match 10	New England Revolution	2–2	Houston Dynamo	Foxborough, MA
6:30pm	Sène 26', 57'; Feilhaber (yellow card) 65'	Report	Bruin 32'; Carr (yellow card) 63'; Boswell (yellow card) 64'; Luiz Camargo 87'	Stadium: Gillette Stadium; Attendance: 16,414; Referee: Baldomero Toledo

May 26 Match 11	Houston Dynamo	2–1	Los Angeles Galaxy	Houston, TX
1:30pm	Magee 38' (o.g.); Hainault 57'; Watson (yellow card) 86'	Report	Buddle 10'; Stephens (yellow card) 46'; Gaul (yellow card) 59'; Magee (yellow card) 90+2'	Stadium: BBVA Compass Stadium; Attendance: 22,039; Referee: Silviu Petrescu

June 10 Match 12	Vancouver Whitecaps FC	3–1	Houston Dynamo	Vancouver, BC
6:00pm	Mattocks 4', 66'; Davidson (yellow card) 68'; Harvey 88'	Report	Davis (yellow card) 79'; Kandji 83'; Carr (yellow card) 86'	Stadium: BC Place; Attendance: 18,811; Referee: Ramon Hernandez

June 16 Match 13	Houston Dynamo	2–1	FC Dallas	Houston, TX
6:30pm	Bruin 3'; Ashe (yellow card) 20'; Moffat 76'	Report	Jackson 59'; Benítez (yellow card) 63'; Castillo (yellow card) 67'	Stadium: BBVA Compass Stadium; Attendance: 22,039; Referee: Jair Marrufo

June 20 Match 14	Houston Dynamo	3–3	Toronto FC	Houston, TX
8:00pm	Boswell 20'; Bruin 73', 90'	Report	Hall 13'; Koevermans 22', 45'; Frings (yellow card) 48'; Morgan (yellow card) 83'	Stadium: BBVA Compass Stadium; Attendance: 21,423; Referee: Baldomero Toledo

June 23 Match 15	Montreal Impact	4–2	Houston Dynamo	Montreal, QB
19:30 UTC-5	Nyassi 4'; Arnaud 21' (yellow card) 72'; Camara 60'; Bernier 67'; Felipe (yellow card) 90'	Report	Davis 16'; Clark (yellow card) 40'; Bruin 45'; Boswell (yellow card) 68'; Moffat (red card) 73'	Stadium: Saputo Stadium; Attendance: 12,357; Referee: Jose Carlos Rivero

June 30 Match 16	Houston Dynamo	2–1	Philadelphia Union	Houston, TX
7:30 PM CT	Davis 19'; Ching 83' (pen.)	Recap	Daniel 46'	Stadium: BBVA Compass Stadium; Attendance: 19,806; Referee: Fotis Bazakos

July 3 Match 17	Houston Dynamo	0–0	Chicago Fire	Houston, TX
19:30	Corey Ashe (yellow card) 38'	Report		Stadium: BBVA Compass Stadium; Attendance: 22,039; Referee: Allen Chapman

July 7 Match 18	Sporting Kansas City	0–0	Houston Dynamo	Kansas City, KS
7:30pm		Report		Stadium: Livestrong Sporting Park; Attendance: 19,307; Referee: Chris Penso

July 15 Match 19	Houston Dynamo	4–0	D.C. United	Houston, TX
8:00pm	Davis 19' (pen.); Bruin 37'; García 63'; Ching 89' (pen.)	Report	Hamid (red card) 17'	Stadium: BBVA Compass Stadium; Attendance: 18,871; Referee: (United States) Jasen Anno

July 18 Match 20	Houston Dynamo	2–1	Sporting Kansas City	Houston, TX
7:30pm	Kandji (yellow card) 8'; Carr 25' 79'	Report	Kamara 42' (pen.); Joseph (red card) 47+'	Stadium: BBVA Compass Stadium; Attendance: 19,761; Referee: Mark Kadlecik

July 21 Match 21	Houston Dynamo	3–0	Montreal Impact	Houston, TX
7:30pm	Kandji 7', 89' (yellow card) 89'; Boswell 84'	Report	Thomas (yellow card) 67'; Iapichino (yellow card) 74'	Stadium: BBVA Compass Stadium; Attendance: 20,396; Referee: David Gantar

July 28 Match 22	Toronto FC	0–2	Houston Dynamo	Toronto, ON
3:30pm	Henry (yellow card) 47'; Eckersley (yellow card) 53'	Report	Carr 45'; Ching 86'	Stadium: BMO Field; Attendance: 19,652; Referee: Drew Fischer

August 3 Match 23	Houston Dynamo	2–0	New York Red Bulls	Houston, TX
7:00pm	Taylor 2'; Carr 28'	Report	Pearce (yellow card) 46'; Pálsson (yellow card) 90'	Stadium: BBVA Compass Stadium; Attendance: 22,039; Referee: Silviu Petrescu

August 10 Match 24	New York Red Bulls	2–0	Houston Dynamo	Harrison, NJ
7:00pm	Lindpere (yellow card) 58'; Holgersson 61'; Lade (yellow card) 67'; Solli 90+2'	Report	Kandji (yellow card) 28'	Stadium: Red Bull Arena; Attendance: 15,730; Referee: Chris Penso

August 19 Match 25	Houston Dynamo	2–2	Columbus Crew	Houston, TX
8:00pm	Davis 19'; Moffat 82'	Report	Grossman 33'; Duka (yellow card) 40'; Gaven 58'; Higuaín (yellow card) 79'	Stadium: BBVA Compass Stadium; Referee: Drew Fischer

August 25 Match 26	Houston Dynamo	1–1	Toronto FC	Houston, TX
7:30pm	Bruin 21'; Carr (yellow card) 37'	Report	Dunfield (yellow card) 68'; Dunfield 85'	Stadium: BBVA Compass Stadium; Attendance: 19,320; Referee: Paul Ward

September 2 Match 27	Chicago Fire	3–1	Houston Dynamo	Bridgeview, IL
6:00pm	Nyarko 1'; Paladini 19'; Alex 90+4'	Summary	Boswell (yellow card) 80'; Ching 90+2'	Stadium: Toyota Park; Attendance: 17,007; Referee: Dave Gantar

September 6 Match 28	Houston Dynamo	1–0	Real Salt Lake	Houston, TX
7:30pm	Clark (yellow card) 64'; Carr (yellow card) 64'; Clark 94'	Report	Steele (yellow card) 84'	Stadium: BBVA Compass Stadium; Attendance: 18,452; Referee: Ismail Elfath

September 14 Match 29	Sporting Kansas City	1–1	Houston Dynamo	Kansas City, KS
7:30pm	Sapong 93'	Report	Davis 58'; Luiz Camargo (yellow card) 86'	Stadium: Livestrong Sporting Park; Attendance: 19,887; Referee: Baldomero Toledo

September 23 Match 30	Philadelphia Union	3–1	Houston Dynamo	Chester, PA
4:00pm	Williams (yellow card) 20'; Adu 28', 50' (pen.); Martínez 70'; M. Farfan (yellow card) 82'	Report	Davis (yellow card) 42'; Boniek 44'; Hall (yellow card) 71'; Carr (yellow card) 75'	Stadium: PPL Park; Attendance: 17,666; Referee: Edvin Jurisevic

September 29 Match 31	Houston Dynamo	2–0	New England Revolution	Houston, TX
7:30pm	Clark 77'; García 93'	Report		Stadium: BBVA Compass Stadium; Attendance: 22,039; Referee: Drew Fischer

October 6 Match 32	Houston Dynamo	1–1	Montreal Impact	Houston, TX
7:30pm	Bruin 44'	Summary	Nyassi (yellow card) 65' (goal) 67'; Ferrari (yellow card) 71'	Stadium: BBVA Compass Stadium; Referee: Chris Penso

October 20 Match 33	Houston Dynamo	3–1	Philadelphia Union	Houston, TX
6:30pm	Kandji 5'; Boniek 71'; Davis 75'	Report; TV: NBCSN	McInerney 19'; McInerney (yellow card) 67'	Stadium: BBVA Compass Stadium; Attendance: 22,039; Referee: Mark Geiger

October 27 Match 34	Colorado Rapids	2–0	Houston Dynamo	Commerce City, CO
8:00pm	Hill 9'; Akpan 76'	Report		Stadium: Dick's Sporting Goods Park; Attendance: 15,453; Referee: Hilario Grajeda

=== MLS Cup Playoffs ===
Kickoff times are in CDT.

==== Knockout round ====
October 31 Knockout Round	Chicago Fire	1–2	Houston Dynamo	Bridgeview, IL
7:00pm	Alex 83'	Report	Bruin 12', 46'; Davis (yellow card) 67'; Hall (yellow card) 91'	Stadium: Toyota Park; Attendance: 10,923; Referee: Baldomero Toledo

==== Conference semifinals ====
November 4 Leg 1	Houston Dynamo	2–0	Sporting Kansas City	Houston, TX
2:30pm	Moffat 18'; Carr (yellow card) 27'; Sarkodie (yellow card) 74'; Bruin 75'	Summary	Kamara (yellow card) 42'	Stadium: BBVA Compass Stadium; Attendance: 20,689; Referee: Edwin Jurisevic

November 7 Leg 2	Sporting Kansas City	1–0 (1–2 agg.)	Houston Dynamo	Kansas City, KS
8:00pm	Zusi (yellow card) 26'; Myers (yellow card) 56'; Sinovic 64'	Report	García (yellow card) 41'; Ashe (yellow card) 84'	Stadium: Livestrong Sporting Park; Attendance: 20,894; Referee: Allen Chapman

==== Conference finals ====
November 11 Leg 1	Houston Dynamo	3–1	D.C. United	Houston, TX
3:00pm	Hainault 51'; Bruin 68'; Kandji (yellow card) 76'; Sarkodie 81'	Report	DeLeon 27'	Stadium: BBVA Compass Stadium; Attendance: 22,101; Referee: Ricardo Salazar

November 18 Leg 2	D.C. United	1–1 (2–4 agg.)	Houston Dynamo	Washington, D.C.
3:00pm	Bošković 83'	Report	García 34'	Stadium: RFK Stadium; Attendance: 20,015; Referee: Baldomero Toledo

==== Championship ====
December 1, 2012	Los Angeles Galaxy	3–1	Houston Dynamo	The Home Depot Center, Carson, California
1:30 PM PST	Gonzalez 60'; Donovan 65' (pen.); Keane 90+4' (pen.)	Report	Carr 44'	Attendance: 30,510; Referee: Silviu Petrescu

=== U.S. Open Cup ===
Kickoff times are in CDT.

May 29 Third round	San Antonio Scorpions	1–0	Houston Dynamo	San Antonio, TX
7:30pm	Denissen 51' (pen.)	Report		Stadium: Heroes Stadium

=== Champions League ===
Team	Pld	W	D	L	GF	GA	GD	Pts
(United States) Houston Dynamo	4	2	2	0	9	3	+6	8
(Honduras) Olimpia	4	1	2	1	6	4	+2	5
(El Salvador) FAS	4	1	0	3	3	11	−8	3

August 22 Group stage	CD FAS (El Salvador)	1–3	(United States) Houston Dynamo	San Salvador
9:00pm	Águila 64'	Report	Ching 12'; Weaver 19'; Sarkodie 60'	Stadium: Estadio Cuscatlán; Attendance: 2,510; Referee: Marcos Brea

August 30 Group stage	Olimpia (Honduras)	1–1	(United States) Houston Dynamo	Tegucigalpa
9:00pm	Caetano 6'	Report	Moffat 57'	Stadium: Estadio Tiburcio; Attendance: 3,645; Referee: Marco Rodríguez

September 20 Group stage	Houston Dynamo (United States)	4–0	(El Salvador) CD FAS	Houston, TX
7:00pm	Barnes 21'; Boswell 44'; Weaver 49'; Carr 78'	Report		Stadium: BBVA Compass Stadium

October 23 Group stage	Houston Dynamo (United States)	1–1	(Honduras) Olimpia	Houston, TX
7:00pm	Hainault 65'	Report	Caetano 21'	Stadium: BBVA Compass Stadium; Attendance: 19,462; Referee: Juan Guerra

=== Exhibitions ===
Kickoff times are in CDT.

May 31	Houston Dynamo (United States)	1–2	(Spain) Valencia	Houston, TX
7:30pm	Carr 14'	Report	2' 17' Aduriz	Stadium: BBVA Compass Stadium; Attendance: 22,039

== Statistics ==
=== Appearances and goals ===
Last updated on October 27, 2012.

MLS stats from Houston Dynamo website

No.	Pos	Nat	Player	Total		Major League Soccer		MLS Cup Playoffs		U.S. Open Cup		CONCACAF Champions League	
No.	Pos	Nat	Player	Apps	Goals	Apps	Goals	Apps	Goals	Apps	Goals	Apps	Goals
3	FW	(United States) USA	Calen Carr	31	5	30	5	0	0	0	0	1	0
4	DF	(Jamaica) JAM	Jermaine Taylor	32	1	31	1	0	0	0	0	1	0
5	DF	(United States) USA	Warren Creavalle	16	0	12	0	0	0	1	0	3	0
6	MF	(United States) USA	Nathan Sturgis	9	0	5	0	0	0	1	0	3	0
7	MF	(United States) USA	Colin Clark	19	1	14	1	0	0	1	0	4	0
8	DF	(United States) USA	Kofi Sarkodie	19	1	16	1	0	0	0	0	3	0
9	FW	(Senegal) SEN	Macoumba Kandji	36	4	34	4	0	0	1	0	1	0
10	FW	(Jamaica) JAM	Je-Vaughn Watson	22	1	19	0	0	0	0	0	3	1
11	MF	(United States) USA	Brad Davis	37	8	37	8	0	0	0	0	0	0
12	FW	(United States) USA	Will Bruin	39	16	38	16	0	0	0	0	1	0
14	FW	(United States) USA	Colin Rolfe	1	0	0	0	0	0	1	0	0	0
15	FW	(United States) USA	Cam Weaver	17	2	12	0	0	0	1	0	4	2
16	MF	(United States) USA	Adam Moffat	33	4	29	3	0	0	1	0	3	1
17	MF	(Brazil) BRA	Luiz Camargo	34	1	29	1	0	0	1	0	4	0
18	MF	(United States) USA	Josue Soto	1	0	0	0	0	0	1	0	0	0
19	MF	(United States) USA	Alex Dixon	5	0	4	0	0	0	1	0	0	0
20	MF	(United States) USA	Geoff Cameron	15	0	15	0	0	0	0	0	0	0
22	FW	(United States) USA	Brian Ownby	8	0	7	0	0	0	1	0	0	0
25	FW	(United States) USA	Brian Ching	37	6	34	5	0	0	0	0	3	1
26	MF	(United States) USA	Corey Ashe	37	0	36	0	0	0	0	0	1	0
27	MF	(Honduras) HON	Oscar Boniek Garcia	26	5	23	5	0	0	0	0	3	0
31	DF	(United States) USA	Andre Hainault	32	4	28	3	0	0	1	0	3	1
32	DF	(United States) USA	Bobby Boswell	42	3	39	2	0	0	1	0	2	1

=== Goalkeeper stats ===
No.	Nat.	Player	Total			Major League Soccer		
No.	Nat.	Player	MIN	GA	GAA	MIN	GA	GAA
1	USA	Tally Hall	2946	33	1.19	2946	33	1.19
30	USA	Tyler Deric	0	0	0.00	0	0	0.00

Updated to match played October 28, 2012
Source: Houston Dynamo
Italic: denotes player is no longer with team

=== Top scorers ===
Rank	Nation	Number	Name	Total	Major League Soccer
1	USA	12	Bruin	12	12
2	USA	11	Davis	8	8
3	USA	25	Ching	5	5
4	HON	27	Garcia	4	4
4	USA	3	Carr	4	4
4	SEN	9	Kandji	4	4
5	USA	31	Hainault	2	2
5	USA	32	Boswell	2	2
5	SCO	16	Moffat	2	2

Updated to match played October 8, 2012
Source: Houston Dynamo

== Uniforms ==
Home	Away	Alternate

Type	Shirt	Shorts	Socks
Home	Orange	White	Orange
Away	White	Orange	White
Alternate	Orange	Orange	Orange

== Miscellany ==
=== Allocation ranking ===
Houston is in the #18 position in the MLS Allocation Ranking. The allocation ranking is the mechanism used to determine which MLS club has first priority to acquire a U.S. National Team player who signs with MLS after playing abroad, or a former MLS player who returns to the league after going to a club abroad for a transfer fee. A ranking can be traded, provided that part of the compensation received in return is another club's ranking.

=== International roster spots ===
Houston has 6 MLS International Roster Slots for use in the 2012 season. Each club in Major League Soccer is allocated 8 international roster spots, which can be traded. Houston has previously dealt one spot to New York on 17 March 2009 and dealt another spot to New York on 14 January 2005 while the Houston franchise was still based in San Jose. Press reports did not indicate if or when these roster spots would revert to Houston. On 21 July 2011, Houston traded an international roster spot for the remainder of the 2011 season only to Portland Timbers.

=== Future draft pick trades ===
Future picks acquired:

- 2013 MLS SuperDraft Round 1 pick from Portland Timbers;
- 2014 MLS SuperDraft Round 4 pick from Los Angeles Galaxy.

Future picks traded:

- 2013 MLS SuperDraft Round 4 pick to Colorado Rapids;
- 2013 MLS SuperDraft conditional pick to Montreal Impact;
- 2014 MLS SuperDraft Round 4 pick to Portland Timbers;
- 2014 MLS SuperDraft conditional pick to Colorado Rapids;
- 2014 MLS SuperDraft conditional pick to Toronto FC;
- 2015 MLS SuperDraft Round 4 pick to Columbus Crew.
