= 2012 in Canadian soccer =

The 2012 Season is the 136th season of competitive soccer in Canada under the association rules.

== National teams ==
The home team or the team that is designated as the home team is listed in the left column; the away team is in the right column.

Win Draw Loss

=== Men ===
==== Senior ====
| February 29 Friendly | Armenia | 3–1 | Canada | Limassol, Cyprus |
| 11:00 UTC−06:00 | Pizzelli 22', 67'; Özbiliz 90' (pen.) | Report | McKenna 4' | Stadium: Tsirion Stadium |

| June 3 Friendly | Canada | 0–0 | United States | Toronto |
| 19:00 UTC−05 | | Report | | Stadium: BMO Field; Attendance: 15,247; Referee: Mauricio Morales (MEX) |

| June 8 WCQ R3 | Cuba | 0–1 | Canada | Havana, Cuba |
| 14:00 UTC−4 | | Report | Occean 54' | Stadium: Estadio Pedro Marrero; Attendance: 7,000; Referee: Courtney Campbell (JAM) |

| June 12 WCQ R3 | Canada | 0–0 | Honduras | Toronto |
| 19:45 UTC−4 | | Report | | Stadium: BMO Field; Attendance: 16,132; Referee: Enrico Wijngaarde (SUR) |

| September 7 WCQ R3 | Canada | 1–0 | Panama | Toronto |
| 19:30 UTC−4 | | | | Stadium: BMO Field; Attendance: 17,586 |

| September 11 WCQ R3 | Panama | 0–2 | Canada | Panama City, Panama |
| 20:05 UTC−5 | | | | Stadium: Estadio Rommel Fernández; Attendance: 21,853 |

| October 12 WCQ R3 | Canada | 3–0 | Cuba | Toronto |
| 19:30 UTC−4 | | | | Stadium: BMO Field; Attendance: 17,712 |

| October 16 WCQ R3 | Honduras | 8–1 | Canada | San Pedro Sula, Honduras |
| 19:30 UTC−6 | | | | Stadium: Estadio Olímpico Metropolitano; Attendance: 38,000 |

==== Under-23 ====
| March 22, 2012 Olympic Qualifier | El Salvador | 0–0 | Canada | Nashville, Tennessee |
| 18:30 (EDT) | | Report | | Stadium: LP Field; Attendance: 4,269; Referee: Walter López (Guatemala) |

| March 24, 2012 Olympic Qualifier | United States | 0–2 | Canada | Nashville, Tennessee |
| 19:00 (EDT) | | Report | Henry 58'; Cavallini 83' | Stadium: LP Field; Attendance: 10,578; Referee: Jafeth Perea (Panama) |

| March 26, 2012 Olympic Qualifier | Canada | 1–1 | Cuba | Nashville, Tennessee |
| 18:30 (EDT) | James 25' | Report | Reyes 90' | Stadium: LP Field; Attendance: 7,889; Referee: Hugo Cruz (Costa Rica) |

| March 31, 2012 Olympic Qualifier | Mexico | 3–1 | Canada | Kansas City, Kansas |
| 18:00 (EDT) | Fabián 20'; Pulido 33'; Ponce 59' | Report | Haber 32' | Stadium: Livestrong Sporting Park; Attendance: 16,101; Referee: Jafeth Perea (Panama) |

=== Women ===
==== Senior ====
2012 Olympic Qualifying Tournament

| January 19 Group play | Canada | 6–0 | Haiti | Vancouver, British Columbia |
| 19:30 PST UTC−8 | Julien 7'; Sinclair 25', 44', 56', 86' (pen.); Parker 90+2' | Report | | Stadium: BC Place; Attendance: 7,627; Referee: Kari Seitz (United States) |

| January 21 Group play | Canada | 2–0 | Cuba | Vancouver, British Columbia |
| 19:30 PST UTC−8 | Sinclair 17' (pen.); Tancredi 24' | Report | | Stadium: BC Place; Attendance: 12,000; Referee: Gillian Martindale (Barbados) |

| January 23 Group play | Canada | 5–1 | Costa Rica | Vancouver, British Columbia |
| 19:30 PST UTC−8 | Sinclair 6', 45'; Schmidt 10'; Kyle 19'; Ugalde 50' (o.g.) | Report | Barrantes 89' | Stadium: BC Place; Attendance: 8,105; Referee: Kari Seitz (United States) |

| January 27 Semi-final | Canada | 3–1 | Mexico | Vancouver, British Columbia |
| 20:00 PST UTC−8 | Sinclair 15', 76'; Tancredi 23' | Report | Pérez 67' | Stadium: BC Place; Attendance: 22,954; Referee: Diane Ferreira-James (Guyana) |

| January 29 Final | Canada | 0–4 | United States | Vancouver, British Columbia |
| 17:00 PST UTC−8 | | Report | Morgan 4', 56'; Wambach 24', 28' | Stadium: BC Place; Attendance: 25,427; Referee: Quetzalli Alvarado (Mexico) |

Friendlies

| March 24 Friendly | Canada | 2–1 | Brazil | Foxborough, USA |
| 13:00 (ET) | Sinclair 12', 78' | Report | Gabriella 87' | Stadium: Gillette Stadium |

== Leagues ==
=== Men ===
==== Major League Soccer ====
===== Regular season =====
| Pos | Team | Pld | W | L | T | GF | GA | GD | Pts | |
|---|---|---|---|---|---|---|---|---|---|---|
| 1 | San Jose Earthquakes (S) | 34 | 19 | 6 | 9 | 72 | 43 | +29 | 66 | Qualification for the CONCACAF Champions League |
| 2 | Sporting Kansas City (U) | 34 | 18 | 7 | 9 | 42 | 27 | +15 | 63 | Qualification for the CONCACAF Champions League |
| 3 | D.C. United | 34 | 17 | 10 | 7 | 53 | 43 | +10 | 58 | |
| 4 | New York Red Bulls | 34 | 16 | 9 | 9 | 57 | 46 | +11 | 57 | |
| 5 | Real Salt Lake | 34 | 17 | 11 | 6 | 46 | 35 | +11 | 57 | |
| 6 | Chicago Fire | 34 | 17 | 11 | 6 | 46 | 41 | +5 | 57 | |
| 7 | Seattle Sounders FC | 34 | 15 | 8 | 11 | 51 | 33 | +18 | 56 | |
| 8 | LA Galaxy (C) | 34 | 16 | 12 | 6 | 59 | 47 | +12 | 54 | Qualification for the CONCACAF Champions League |
| 9 | Houston Dynamo | 34 | 14 | 9 | 11 | 48 | 41 | +7 | 53 | Qualification for the CONCACAF Champions League |
| 10 | Columbus Crew | 34 | 15 | 12 | 7 | 44 | 44 | 0 | 52 | |
| 11 | Vancouver Whitecaps FC | 34 | 11 | 13 | 10 | 35 | 41 | −6 | 43 | |
| 12 | Montreal Impact | 34 | 12 | 16 | 6 | 45 | 51 | −6 | 42 | Qualification for the CONCACAF Champions League |
| 13 | FC Dallas | 34 | 9 | 13 | 12 | 42 | 47 | −5 | 39 | |
| 14 | Colorado Rapids | 34 | 11 | 19 | 4 | 44 | 50 | −6 | 37 | |
| 15 | Philadelphia Union | 34 | 10 | 18 | 6 | 37 | 45 | −8 | 36 | |
| 16 | New England Revolution | 34 | 9 | 17 | 8 | 39 | 44 | −5 | 35 | |
| 17 | Portland Timbers | 34 | 8 | 16 | 10 | 34 | 56 | −22 | 34 | |
| 18 | Chivas USA | 34 | 7 | 18 | 9 | 24 | 58 | −34 | 30 | |
| 19 | Toronto FC (V) | 34 | 5 | 21 | 8 | 36 | 62 | −26 | 23 | |

Source: MLS
Rules for classification: 1) points; 2) head-to-head record; 3) goal difference; 4) number of goals scored
(C) MLS Cup champions; (S) Supporters' Shield winners; (U) U.S. Open Cup winners; (V) Canadian Championship winners

===== Playoffs =====
Knockout round

| Team 1 | Score | Team 2 |
|---|---|---|
| LA Galaxy | 2–1 | Vancouver Whitecaps FC |

==== North American Soccer League ====
| Pos | Team | Pld | W | D | L | GF | GA | GD | Pts | Qualification |
|---|---|---|---|---|---|---|---|---|---|---|
| 1 | San Antonio Scorpions (X) | 28 | 13 | 8 | 7 | 46 | 27 | +19 | 47 | Playoff semifinals |
| 2 | Tampa Bay Rowdies (C) | 28 | 12 | 9 | 7 | 37 | 30 | +7 | 45 | Playoff semifinals |
| 3 | Puerto Rico Islanders | 28 | 11 | 8 | 9 | 32 | 30 | +2 | 41 | Playoff quarterfinals |
| 4 | Carolina RailHawks | 28 | 10 | 10 | 8 | 44 | 46 | −2 | 40 | Playoff quarterfinals |
| 5 | Fort Lauderdale Strikers | 28 | 9 | 9 | 10 | 40 | 46 | −6 | 36 | Playoff quarterfinals |
| 6 | Minnesota United | 28 | 8 | 11 | 9 | 34 | 33 | +1 | 35 | Playoff quarterfinals |
| 7 | Atlanta Silverbacks | 28 | 7 | 9 | 12 | 35 | 46 | −11 | 30 | |
| 8 | FC Edmonton | 28 | 5 | 10 | 13 | 26 | 36 | −10 | 25 | |

Source: NASL Standings
Rules for classification: 1) points; 2) goal difference; 3) number of goals scored.
(C) Champions; (X) Commissioner's Cup (regular season champion)

==== Canadian Soccer League ====
===== Regular season =====
| Pos | Team | Pld | W | D | L | GF | GA | GD | Pts | Qualification |
|---|---|---|---|---|---|---|---|---|---|---|
| 1 | Toronto Croatia (A, C, O) | 22 | 15 | 6 | 1 | 57 | 13 | +44 | 51 | Playoffs |
| 2 | Montreal Impact Academy (A) | 22 | 14 | 5 | 3 | 52 | 17 | +35 | 47 | Playoffs |
| 3 | SC Toronto (A) | 22 | 14 | 4 | 4 | 51 | 16 | +35 | 46 | Playoffs |
| 4 | Windsor Stars (A) | 22 | 12 | 4 | 6 | 46 | 21 | +25 | 40 | Playoffs |
| 5 | York Region Shooters (A) | 22 | 9 | 11 | 2 | 33 | 19 | +14 | 38 | Playoffs |
| 6 | Serbian White Eagles (A) | 22 | 10 | 5 | 7 | 48 | 35 | +13 | 35 | Playoffs |
| 7 | TFC Academy (A) | 22 | 10 | 5 | 7 | 42 | 28 | +14 | 35 | Playoffs |
| 8 | Niagara United (A) | 22 | 10 | 3 | 9 | 34 | 36 | −2 | 33 | Playoffs |
| 9 | SC Waterloo Region | 22 | 10 | 1 | 11 | 46 | 37 | +9 | 31 | |
| 10 | Mississauga Eagles | 22 | 8 | 5 | 9 | 42 | 44 | −2 | 29 | |
| 11 | Brampton United | 22 | 8 | 4 | 10 | 49 | 35 | +14 | 28 | |
| 12 | London City | 22 | 7 | 7 | 8 | 34 | 55 | −21 | 28 | |
| 13 | Brantford Galaxy | 22 | 8 | 1 | 13 | 40 | 68 | −28 | 25 | |
| 14 | Kingston FC | 22 | 4 | 1 | 17 | 23 | 61 | −38 | 13 | |
| 15 | St. Catharines Wolves | 22 | 1 | 5 | 16 | 13 | 67 | −54 | 8 | |
| 16 | North York Astros | 22 | 2 | 1 | 19 | 15 | 73 | −58 | 7 | |

Source: []
Rules for classification: 1) points; 2) goal difference; 3) number of goals scored.
(A) Advance to a further round; (C) Champions; (O) Play-off winners

===== Playoffs =====
Quarter-Final
1 | Toronto Croatia | 2
8 | Niagara United | 0
3 | SC Toronto | 0
6 | Serbian White Eagles | 1
2 | Montreal Impact Academy | 2
7 | TFC Academy | 0
4 | Windsor Stars | 0
5 | York Region Shooters | 1

Semi-Final
1 | Toronto Croatia | 4
6 | Serbian White Eagles | 0
2 | Montreal Impact Academy | 3
5 | York Region Shooters | 1

Final
1 | Toronto Croatia | 1
2 | Montreal Impact Academy | 0

==== Premier Development League ====
In 2012 there were nine Canadian teams playing in the US-based USL PDL:

- Victoria Highlanders
- Vancouver Whitecaps FC U-23
- Abbotsford Mariners
- WSA Winnipeg
- Thunder Bay Chill
- Forest City London
- Hamilton Rage
- Toronto Lynx
- Ottawa Fury

=== Women ===
==== W-League ====
For details on Canadian W-League teams' year, please refer to 2012 W-League season.

== Canadian clubs in international competitions ==
=== Toronto FC ===
2011–12 edition

| March 7, 2012 Quarterfinals | Toronto FC (Canada) | 2–2 | (United States) Los Angeles Galaxy | Toronto |
| 20:00 UTC−05:00 | Johnson 12'; Silva 17' | Report | Magee 29'; Donovan 88' | Stadium: Rogers Centre; Attendance: 47,658; Referee: Courtney Campbell (Jamaica) |

| March 14, 2012 Quarterfinals | Los Angeles Galaxy (United States) | 1–2 (3–4 agg.) | (Canada) Toronto FC | Carson, United States |
| 22:00 UTC−04:00 | Harden 55' (o.g.) | Report | Johnson 34'; Soolsma 67' | Stadium: The Home Depot Center; Attendance: 7,500; Referee: Roberto Moreno (PAN) |

| March 28, 2012 Semifinals | Toronto FC (Canada) | 1–1 | (Mexico) Santos Laguna | Toronto |
| 20:00 UTC−04:00 | Aceval 37' | Report | Gomez 30' | Stadium: BMO Field; Attendance: 18,950; Referee: Ricardo Salazar (United States) |

| April 4, 2012 Semifinals | Santos Laguna (Mexico) | 6–2 (7–3 agg.) | (Canada) Toronto FC | Torreón, Mexico |
| 20:00 UTC−04:00 | Gomez 31', 45+2'; Rodríguez 56' (pen.), 64' (pen.); Peralta 66'; Ludueña 90+2' | Report | Plata 15', 43' | Stadium: Estadio Corona; Attendance: 26,483; Referee: Benigno Pineda (Honduras) |
