= 2012 Walt Disney World Pro Soccer Classic =

Tournament details
- Host country: United States
- Dates: February 24 – March 3
- Teams: 8
- Venue(s): 1 (in 1 host city)

Final positions
- Champions: Vancouver Whitecaps FC (1st title)
- Runners-up: Toronto FC
- Third place: FC Dallas

Tournament statistics
- Matches played: 14
- Goals scored: 32 (2.29 per match)
- Top scorer(s): (France) Sébastien Le Toux (3 goals)

The 2012 Walt Disney World Pro Soccer Classic was a preseason soccer tournament held at Walt Disney World's ESPN Wide World of Sports Complex. The tournament, the third edition of the Pro Soccer Classic, was held from February 24 to March 3 and featured six Major League Soccer clubs along with one USL Pro club and one Swedish Allsvenskan club.

The tournament was won by the Vancouver Whitecaps FC, who defeated Toronto FC 1–0 in the final.

== Teams ==
The following eight clubs competed in the tournament:

- Orlando City from the USL Professional Division, hosts (2nd appearance)
- Toronto FC from Major League Soccer (3rd appearance)
- FC Dallas from Major League Soccer (3rd appearance)
- Houston Dynamo from Major League Soccer (3rd appearance)
- Sporting Kansas City from Major League Soccer (1st appearance)
- Montreal Impact from Major League Soccer (1st appearance)
- Vancouver Whitecaps FC from Major League Soccer (1st appearance)
- BK Häcken from Allsvenskan (1st appearance)

== Matches ==
=== Group stage ===
Tie-breaking criteria
If two or more teams were equal on points on completion of the group matches, the following criteria would be applied to determine the rankings:

1. winner of head-to-head match;
2. superior goal difference from all group matches played;
3. higher number of goals scored from all group matches played;
4. lowest number of goals allowed from all group matches played;
5. single point deduction per red card or send off;
6. coin toss with the club whose home city is list first alphabetically calling the toss;

Key to colours in group tables
Group winners advance to Final
Group runners-up advance to Consolation

==== Pool 1 ====
Team	Pld	W	L	D	GF	GA	GD	Pts
Vancouver Whitecaps FC	3	3	0	0	7	0	+7	9
Houston Dynamo	3	0	1	2	1	2	–1	2
Montreal Impact	3	0	1	2	2	5	–3	2
Sporting Kansas City	3	0	1	2	1	4	–3	2

February 24
18:00 UTC-5

Sporting Kansas City	0–0	Houston Dynamo
	Recap

ESPN Wide World of Sports Complex, Bay Lake, Florida, USA
Referee: Edvin Jurisevic
February 24
20:00 UTC-5

Montreal Impact	0–3	Vancouver Whitecaps FC
	Recap	Hassli 38'; Mattocks 69'; Le Toux 83' (pen.)

ESPN Wide World of Sports Complex, Bay Lake, Florida, USA

February 26
13:00 UTC-5

Vancouver Whitecaps FC	1–0	Houston Dynamo
Le Toux 15' (pen.)	Recap

ESPN Wide World of Sports Complex, Bay Lake, Florida, USA
February 26
15:00 UTC-5

Sporting Kansas City	1–1	Montreal Impact
Saad 70'	Recap	Fucito 38'

ESPN Wide World of Sports Complex, Bay Lake, Florida, USA

February 29
18:00 UTC-5

Sporting Kansas City	0–3	Vancouver Whitecaps FC
	Recap	Le Toux 50'; Teibert 62'; Mitchell 67'

ESPN Wide World of Sports Complex, Bay Lake, Florida, USA
Referee: Andrew Chapin
February 29
20:00 UTC-5

Montreal Impact	1–1	Houston Dynamo
Bernier 56'	Recap	Bruin 49'

ESPN Wide World of Sports Complex, Bay Lake, Florida, USA

==== Pool 2 ====
Team	Pld	W	L	D	GF	GA	GD	Pts
Toronto FC	3	2	0	1	8	3	+5	7
FC Dallas	3	1	1	1	5	4	+1	4
BK Häcken	3	1	1	1	4	4	0	4
Orlando City	3	0	2	1	2	8	–6	1

February 25
18:00 UTC-5

Orlando City	2–2	Toronto FC
Rooney 17' (pen.); Molino 55'	Recap	Aceval 23'; Frings 62'

ESPN Wide World of Sports Complex, Bay Lake, Florida, USA
Referee: Geoff Gamble
February 25
20:00 UTC-5

BK Häcken	1–1	FC Dallas
Östberg 79'	Recap	Castillo 45+'

ESPN Wide World of Sports Complex, Bay Lake, Florida, USA
Referee: Silviu Petrescu

February 28
18:00 UTC-5

Toronto FC	3–1	BK Häcken
Johnson 44'; Orozco 85'; Plata 90+1'	Recap	Drugge 57' (pen.)

ESPN Wide World of Sports Complex, Bay Lake, Florida, USA
Referee: Tyler Ploeger
February 28
18:00 UTC-5

Orlando City	0–4	FC Dallas
	Recap	Ferreira 5' (pen.); Castillo 33'; Pérez 55'; Wiedeman 89'

ESPN Wide World of Sports Complex, Bay Lake, Florida, USA

March 1
18:00 UTC-5

Toronto FC	3–0	FC Dallas
Silva 35', 40'; Johnson 82'	Recap

ESPN Wide World of Sports Complex, Bay Lake, Florida, USA
March 1
20:00 UTC-5

Orlando City	0–2	BK Häcken
	Recap	Anklev 61', 66'

ESPN Wide World of Sports Complex, Bay Lake, Florida, USA

=== Championship Round ===
==== Consolation match ====
March 3
18:00 UTC-5

Houston Dynamo	0–1	FC Dallas
	Recap	Shea 9' (pen.)

ESPN Wide World of Sports Complex, Bay Lake, Florida, USA
Referee: Jorge Gonzalez

==== Final ====
March 3
20:00 UTC-5

Vancouver Whitecaps FC	1–0	Toronto FC
Camilo 10'	Recap

ESPN Wide World of Sports Complex, Bay Lake, Florida, USA
Referee: Mark Geiger
