= Richard Eckersley (footballer) =

English footballer (born 1989)

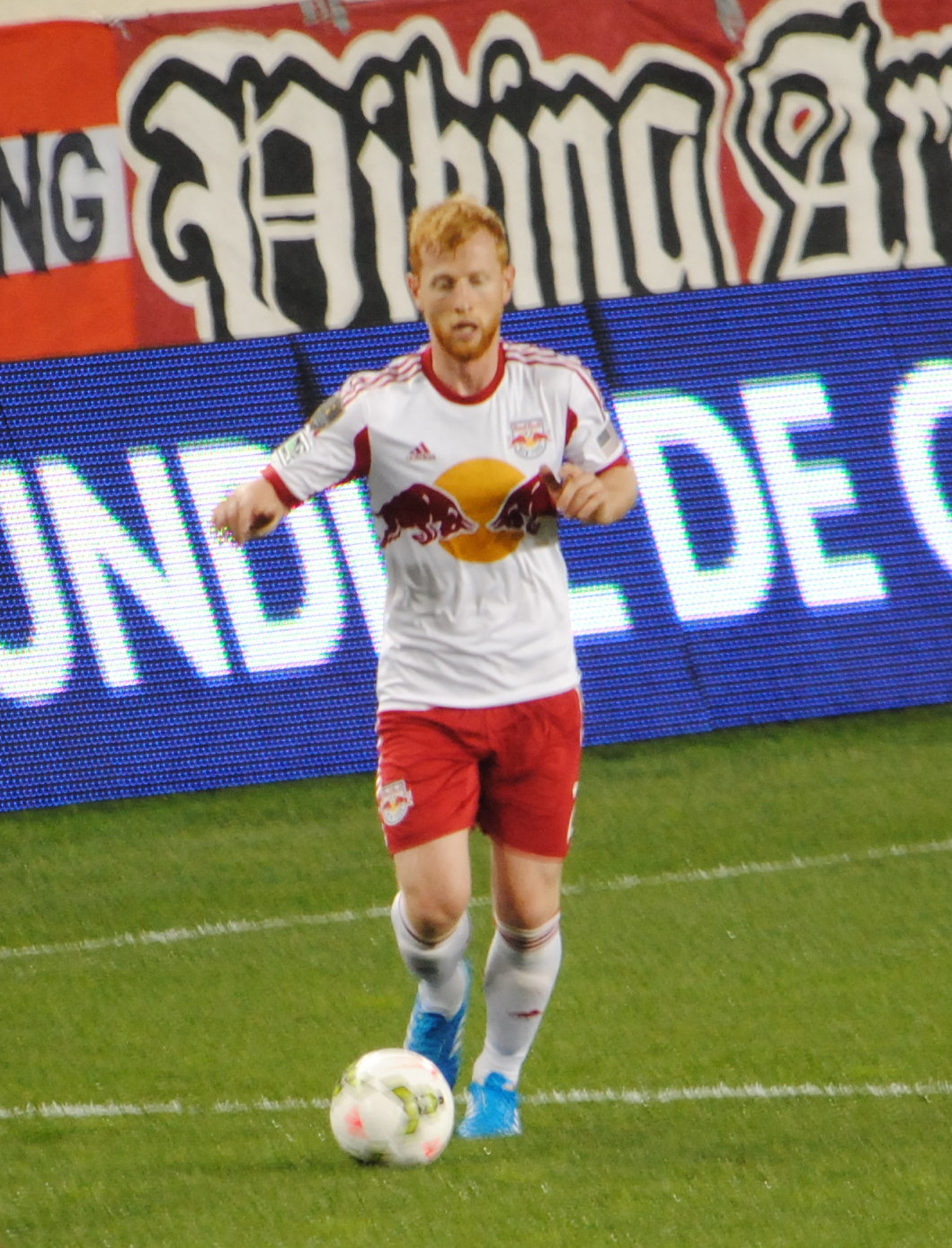
- Eckersley playing for New York Red Bulls in 2014

Personal information
- Full name: Richard Jon Eckersley
- Date of birth: 12 March 1989 (age 37)
- Place of birth: Salford, Manchester, England
- Height: 1.83 m (6 ft 0 in)
- Position: Full-back

Youth career
- 2005–2007: Manchester United

Senior career*
Years	Team	Apps	(Gls)
2007–2009	Manchester United	2	(0)
2009–2012	Burnley	0	(0)
2010	→ Plymouth Argyle (loan)	7	(0)
2010–2011	→ Bradford City (loan)	12	(0)
2011	→ Bury (loan)	3	(0)
2011	→ Toronto FC (loan)	23	(0)
2012–2013	Toronto FC	49	(0)
2014	New York Red Bulls	9	(0)
2014	→ New York Red Bulls II (loan)	4	(0)
2015–2016	Oldham Athletic	4	(0)
Total		113	(0)
- * Club domestic league appearances and goals

Richard Jon Eckersley (born 12 March 1989) is an English former professional footballer who played as a full-back.

Richard Eckersley began his career with Manchester United before signing a four-year contract with Burnley in July 2009. After joining Burnley, he spent loan spells with Plymouth Argyle, Bradford City and Bury. He went on loan to Toronto FC in 2011 before making a permanent transfer to the club the following season.

== Career ==
=== Manchester United ===
Eckersley was born in Salford, Greater Manchester. and grew up in Walkden. He made his first appearance for Manchester United in February 2004, when he played for the under-17 side as a 14-year-old against Manchester City. He joined the club as a trainee in July 2005, and started playing for the under-18s soon after. However, a long-term injury kept him out of contention for almost eight months, and he only made three appearances in the 2005–06 season. In 2006–07, he established himself as a regular in the under-18 side, making 25 appearances in all competitions. He also made his first appearance for the reserve team on 15 February 2007, when he played in a goalless draw away to Bolton Wanderers. On 8 May 2007, he was named at right back for the final of the Manchester Senior Cup against Manchester City; the team lost the match 3–1.

The following season saw Eckersley emerge as a regular reserve team player, making 23 appearances in all competitions as the team reached the final of the Lancashire Senior Cup and the final of the Manchester Senior Cup for the second year in a row. Eckersley played in both matches, and finally got his hands on a Manchester Senior Cup winners' medal at the second time of asking. He also got his first taste of first team football in December 2007, when he was named as an unused substitute for United's dead rubber Champions League group stage match against Roma.

He continued in the reserve team in 2008–09, and was also named on the bench for the first team's 3–1 League Cup third round win over Middlesbrough. He made his first team debut in an FA Cup fixture at home to Tottenham Hotspur on 24 January 2009, coming on as a 53rd-minute substitute for fellow debutant Fabio. His league debut came three days later, on 27 January 2009, when he came on as a 71st-minute substitute for Gary Neville in a 5–0 win over West Bromwich Albion. On 1 March 2009, Eckersley was named on the substitutes bench for the League Cup Final which United won 4–1 on penalties, this gave Eckersley the first medal of his career.

=== Burnley ===
On 15 July 2009, Eckersley signed a four-year contract with Premier League newcomers Burnley. Although Eckersley had refused the offer of a new contract with Manchester United, as he was under the age of 24, his old club was entitled to compensation from Burnley. Eckersley made his Burnley debut in the 2009–10 Football League Cup, playing in the club's second round match against Hartlepool United. Although Eckersley was sent off in the tenth minute of extra time, Burnley went on to win the match 2–1.

On 5 March 2010, Eckersley joined Plymouth Argyle on a one-month loan deal as cover for the injured Réda Johnson. The move also allowed Eckersley much-needed match experience, having made just three cup appearances for Burnley since joining from Manchester United. Eckersley made his Plymouth Argyle debut the next day, where he made his first start, in a 1–0 win over Preston North End. On 1 April 2010, the loan was extended until the end of the season.

On 12 November 2010, he had another loan spell, this time with League Two side Bradford City until 3 January 2011. Eckersley made his Bradford City debut on 20 November 2010, where he made his first Bradford City start, in a 1–0 loss against Macclesfield Town. His loan spell was extended for another month, before he returned after playing 13 games.

On 14 March 2011, he joined Bury on yet another loan spell, until the end of the season, and was given the number 27 shirt. Eckersley made his Bury debut the next day, on 15 March 2011, in a 2–1 loss against Torquay United. Eckersley went on to make three appearances for the club.

=== Toronto FC ===
It was announced on 15 April 2011 that he would be moving to Major League Soccer side Toronto FC on loan until January 2012. The move found the defender again paired with Toronto's current Director of Player Development Paul Mariner, who served as Plymouth's manager during the defender's stint with the club. Eckersley made his debut for Toronto on 23 April 2011 in a 1–1 home draw against Columbus Crew as a second half sub for Javier Martina. Due to the season-ending injury to Adrian Cann and long term injury of Dicoy Williams, Coach Aron Winter was forced to use Eckerley in the centre of defence in early July and was extremely impressive in two consecutive victories over Vancouver Whitecaps FC. In his first season at the club Eckersley helped Toronto win the Canadian Championship, starting both legs of the final against Vancouver Whitecaps FC, winning 3-2 on aggregate.

On 25 January 2012, Burnley announced the cancellation of Eckersley's contract by mutual consent, allowing him to make a permanent move to Toronto FC. Toronto FC announced his permanent move to the club on 26 January 2012. Eckersley's first game after signing for the club on a permanent basis came in the opening game of the season, where he made his first start, in a 3–1 loss against Seattle Sounders FC on 17 March 2012. Eckersley then provided an assist for Ryan Johnson to score the only goal for Toronto, as they lost 2–1 against Sporting Kansas City. For the second time running, Eckersley established himself in the right–back position, though played in the centre–back with Darren O'Dea and helped Toronto to another Canadian Championship later that season.

In the 2013, Eckersley started well at the start of the season until he injured his hamstring against FC Dallas, on 6 April 2013 while celebrating a late goal by teammate Darel Russell, in the 90th minute, that tied the game. After missing nine games with the club as a result of the injury, the club stated on 29 May 2013 that the fullback had re-torn the muscle in training, and his return would be delayed. After spending two months on the sidelines, Eckersley made his return to training on 10 July 2013 and made his first team return four days later, in a 1–0 loss against Sporting Kansas City. As a result of these injuries, he was limited to only 16 league appearances in 2013. At the end of the season, Eckersley was expected to leave the club.

=== New York Red Bulls ===
On 27 January 2014, Toronto FC traded Eckersley to New York Red Bulls in exchange for a fourth-round pick in the 2017 MLS SuperDraft.

Eckersley made his New York Red Bulls debut in the opening game of the season, in a 4–1 loss against Vancouver Whitecaps on 9 March 2014. After starting the first few games of the season Eckersley lost his place due to injury, but by season's end he reclaimed his starting role and helped the club qualify for the playoffs. Eckersley finished the season very strong playing an important role in the team getting to the eastern conference final.

On 2 December 2014, New York Red Bulls announced that Eckersley would listen to offers elsewhere once his contract expires with major league on 31 December 2014.

=== Oldham Athletic ===
After leaving New York Red Bulls, Eckersley went on trial at La Liga side Elche and Southend United, but didn't get a contract.

Eckersley returned to England, signing for League One side Oldham Athletic on a three–month contract on 18 September 2015. After appearing in the first team as an un-used substitute against Doncaster Rovers the next day, Eckersley made his Oldham Athletic debut, where he came on as a substitute for Daniel Lafferty in the 63rd minute, in a 0–0 draw against Rochdale on 24 October 2015.

Then on 18 December 2015, Eckersley signed a one–month contract However, Eckersley suffered ankle injury soon after and was released by the club, though he continued to rehabilitation with the club until it recovered.

== Personal life ==
He is the younger brother of footballer Adam Eckersley and younger brother of Mike Eckersley. He now runs a zero waste shop in Totnes.

== Career statistics ==
Appearances and goals by club, season and competition
Club	Season	League			Cup^{1}		League Cup^{2}		Continental^{3}		Other^{4}		Total	
Club	Season	League	Apps	Goals	Apps	Goals	Apps	Goals	Apps	Goals	Apps	Goals	Apps	Goals
Manchester United	2008–09	Premier League	2	0	2	0	0	0	0	0	0	0	4	0
Burnley	2009–10	Premier League	0	0	1	0	2	0	—				3	0
Burnley	2010–11	Championship	0	0	0	0	1	0	—				1	0
Burnley	2011–12	Championship	0	0	0	0	0	0	—				0	0
Burnley	Total		0	0	1	0	3	0	—				4	0
Plymouth Argyle (loan)	2009–10	Championship	7	0	0	0	0	0	—		—		7	0
Bradford City (loan)	2010–11	League Two	12	0	0	0	0	0	—		—		12	0
Bury (loan)	2010–11	League One	3	0	0	0	0	0	—		—		3	0
Toronto FC	2011	MLS	23	0	4	0	—		4^{5}	0	—		31	0
Toronto FC	2012	MLS	33	0	4	0	—		7^{6}	0	—		46	0
Toronto FC	2013	MLS	16	0	0	0	—		—		—		16	0
Toronto FC	Total		72	0	8	0	–		11	0	–		91	0
New York Red Bulls	2014	MLS	9	0	0	0	—		3	0	5	0	17	0
Oldham Athletic	2015–16	League One	4	0	2	0	0	0	—				6	0
Career Total			109	0	13	0	3	0	14	0	5	0	139	0

- 1.Includes FA Cup, Canadian Championship, and U.S. Open Cup.
- 2.Includes Football League Cup.
- 3.Includes CONCACAF Champions League.
- 4.Includes MLS Cup playoffs.
- 5.Played four matches in the CONCACAF Champions League in 2011.
- 6.For the 2012 season, he played in four matches in the 2011–12 CONCACAF Champions League and three in the 2012–13 CONCACAF Champions League.

== Honours ==
Manchester United

- Football League Cup: 2008–09

Toronto FC

- Canadian Championship: 2011, 2012

Individual

- Denzil Haroun Reserve Team Player of the Year: 2007–08
- Red Patch Boys Player of the Year: 2012
