= Freddy Hall =

Bermudian footballer (1985–2022)

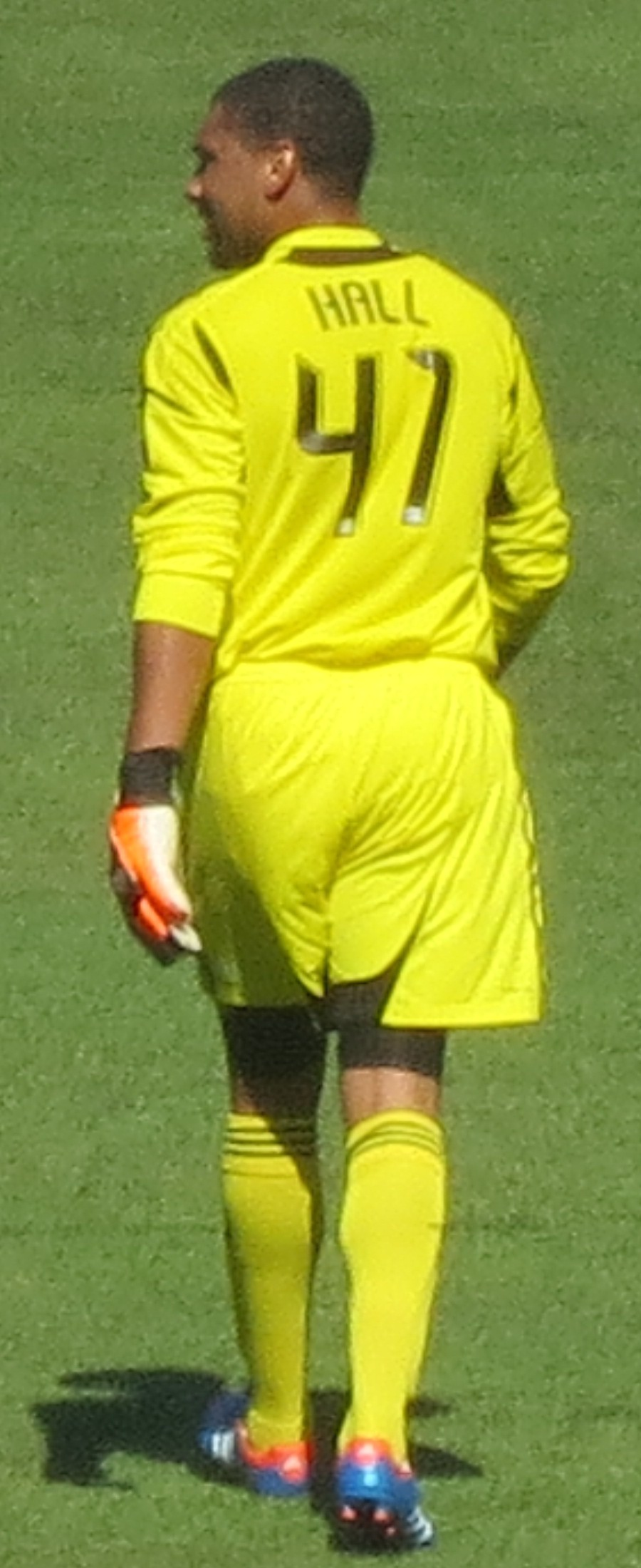
- Hall playing for Toronto FC in a friendly against Liverpool

Personal information
- Full name: Frederick Michael George Hall
- Date of birth: 3 March 1985
- Place of birth: St George's, Bermuda
- Date of death: 24 April 2022 (aged 37)
- Place of death: St George's, Bermuda
- Height: 1.88 m (6 ft 2 in)
- Position: Goalkeeper

Youth career
- St. George's Colts

College career
Years	Team	Apps	(Gls)
2004–2005	South Florida Bulls	4	(0)
2006–2009	Quinnipiac Bobcats	55	(0)

Senior career*
Years	Team	Apps	(Gls)
2010	Bermuda Hogges	11	(0)
2010–2011	St. George's Colts		
2011–2012	Northampton Town	3	(0)
2012	Toronto FC	6	(0)
2014	Burton Albion	0	(0)
2014	Chester	4	(0)
2014	Oxford City	1	(0)
2014–2015	AFC Telford United	21	(0)
2015–2018	Limerick	41	(0)
2018–2022	St. George's Colts	36	(0)
Total		188	(0)

International career
2011–2015	Bermuda	10	(0)
- * Club domestic league appearances and goals

Frederick Michael George Hall (3 March 1985 – 24 April 2022) was a Bermudian professional footballer who played as a goalkeeper.

== Early life ==
Hall grew up in St. George's, Bermuda, and started his football career as goalkeeper for the St. George's Colts in the island's junior league. From 2000 to 2004, he attended Holderness School in New Hampshire, where he was an all-state and a Lake Region All-Star, as well as being a Boston Globe All-Scholastic player, an All-New England selection, and a nominee for the Boston All-Scholastic Player of the Year, and was honored as a member of the NEPSSA Senior All-Star Game.

== College career ==
Hall began playing college soccer at the University of South Florida in 2004, earning his first-career victory, recording six saves, in USF's 4–1 win over East Carolina.

He transferred to Quinnipiac University in 2006. At Quinnipiac, his goalkeeper coach was former Trinidad and Tobago, Portsmouth and West Ham United goalkeeper Shaka Hislop, who continued to be involved in his career later, arranging trials for Hall. Hall was a three-year starter for the Bobcats, earning 26 wins and 22 shutouts, while leading them to back-to-back NEC Tournament berths for the first time in program history in 2008 and 2009. In 2007, as a sophomore he the NCAA in save percentage (.915 or 91.5%) and saves per game (7.38). In 2007 and 2008, he was named to the All-NEC Second Team. During his senior year in 2009, he led the entire country with 121 saves. He was named to ESPN Soccernet's Top 10 Goalkeepers of 2010 Class of Prospects list following his senior season, also being named an All-NEC First Team All-star and named to the All-Tournament team, and a 2009 Adidas National Soccer Coaches Association of America All-North Atlantic Regional Second Team. He was also named the Bobats MVP and the Players' Player of the Year Award.

== Club career ==
In the winter of 2009, Hall was invited to trials with Charlton Athletic, but opted to finish university before attempting trials or pursuing professional football.

He then joined the Bermuda Hogges in the USL Premier Development League.

Hall was allowed to leave the Hogges prior to the end of the 2010 PDL season to attend a trial in England at League 1 team Plymouth Argyle. Hall made his first appearance for The Pilgrims on trial, having come on for the injured Romain Larrieu in an away defeat against Devon rivals Torquay United in a pre-season game that ended 3–1 to The Gulls. He was unable to sign with Plymouth, who were under administration at the time. in addition, Argyle manager Peter Reid described Hall's performance during trials as "smashing", with no firm deal in place, Hall returned home to Bermuda after the two-week trial with the possibility of returning to Argyle later in the year.

In 2011, he played with St. George's Colts in the Bermudian Premier Division.

On 7 July 2011, Hall signed a one-year deal with English League Two side Northampton Town. Hall made his Northampton Town debut in an away game against Morecambe on 7 January 2012 after new signing Shane Higgs suffered a ruptured Achilles tendon in training after having only played a few games for Northampton himself.

Afterwards, he went on trial with Major League Soccer club Toronto FC. On 21 July 2012, during his three-week trial with Toronto FC, Hall debuted against Liverpool in a friendly that ended in a 1–1 draw. Hall signed a contract with Toronto FC on 31 July 2012. Hall made his league debut on 22 August, in a 2–1 away defeat to Columbus Crew. In a CONCACAF Champions League match against Mexican club Santos Laguna on 28 August, Hall made a notable save while a black cat sprinted across the field behind him. Hall was released by Toronto in December 2012. After returning to Bermuda, he went back to the United Kingdom in September 2013 to pursue a new contract.

In March 2014, he signed a short-term contract with League Two side Burton Albion, but did not make any appearances.

On 7 August 2014, Hall returned to England, joining Conference Premier side Chester following a successful pre-season trial period. He departed the club on 27 August after making four appearances for the club as a non-contract player (playing for free), but a lack of finances meant they could not retain Hall's services permanently.

Afterwards, he joined Oxford City, making his first and only appearance on 4 October against Colwyn Bay.

On 8 October 2014, he signed for Conference Premier club AFC Telford United. Hall made his debut in a 3–1 away win against Woking F.C. on 20 October. He left the club after the season after the club was relegated having made 23 total appearances for the club (21 in league play).

In July 2015, Hall went on trial with League of Ireland Premier Division side Limerick, signing with them later that month. He made his debut against Derry City on 17 July 2015, it ended in a 0–0 draw. He was named Limerick FC Official Supporters’ Club Player of the Month for September. In November 2015, he extended his contract for another two seasons. On 28 August 2016, Hall won the First Division title with Limerick with six games to spare with a 3–2 win against UCD. He was named to the 2016 PFAI First Division Team of the Year. Hall left the club by mutual consent in February 2018 to return to his native Bermuda.

He later returned to play with St. George's Colts, serving as team captain and a coach. He was named the top goalkeeper of the Bermudian First Division during the 2019–20 season, helping the Colts earn promotion to the Bermudian Premier Division.

== International career ==
Hall represented the Bermuda national team at U17, U21 and senior level.

Hall made his full debut against Trinidad and Tobago on 2 September 2011.

== Personal life ==
On 24 April 2022, Hall was killed in a car crash in Bermuda. Many of Hall's former clubs, including Northampton Town, AFC Telford United and Toronto FC paid tribute to him in the following days across their news and social media outlets.
