= Terry Dunfield =

Canadian retired soccer player

- Dunfield in 2026

Personal information
- Full name: Terence Dunfield
- Date of birth: February 20, 1982 (age 44)
- Place of birth: Vancouver, British Columbia, Canada
- Height: 5 ft 10 in (1.78 m)
- Position: Midfielder

Team information
- Current team: Pacific FC (head coach)

Youth career
- 1999–2000: Manchester City

Senior career*
Years	Team	Apps	(Gls)
2000–2003	Manchester City	9	(0)
2002–2003	→ Bury (loan)	29	(2)
2003–2005	Bury	45	(3)
2007–2009	Macclesfield Town	61	(2)
2009–2010	Shrewsbury Town	46	(2)
2010	Vancouver Whitecaps	7	(2)
2011	Vancouver Whitecaps FC	16	(1)
2011–2013	Toronto FC	56	(6)
2014	Oldham Athletic	2	(0)
2014–2015	Ross County	4	(0)
2016	Toronto Atomic FC	16	(8)

International career
2000	England U18	1	(0)
2000–2001	Canada U20	5	(0)
2002–2003	Canada U23	2	(0)
2010–2015	Canada	14	(1)

Managerial career
- 2017–2023: Toronto FC Academy
- 2022: Canada (assistant)
- 2023: Toronto FC (interim)
- 2024: Toronto FC (assistant)
- 2026–: Pacific FC
- * Club domestic league appearances and goals

Terence Dunfield (born February 20, 1982) is a Canadian former soccer player, coach and pundit, as well as soccer analyst for TSN and colour commentator for OneSoccer. He is the head coach of Pacific FC of the Canadian Premier League.

As a player he was a midfielder who played in the Premier League although briefly for Manchester City, he also played in the English Football League for Bury, Macclesfield Town, Shrewsbury Town and Oldham Athletic, with a brief stint in Scotland with Ross County. He also played in Major League Soccer for both Vancouver Whitecaps FC and Toronto FC, before finishing his career in local soccer with Toronto Atomic FC. He was capped 14 times by Canada.

== Club career ==
As a schoolboy, Dunfield played in a tournament at Keele, where he was scouted by Manchester City. At the age of 15, he made the move to England to join up with City's youth set-up. He progressed through a good youth team which included the likes of Shaun Wright-Phillips and Joey Barton. Dunfield made his only Premier League appearance in 2001. In the last game of the season, against Chelsea, he came on in the 36th minute as a substitute for Jeff Whitley. However, following the departure of Joe Royle and the arrival of Kevin Keegan, Dunfield found first-team opportunities hard to come by. In 2002, he was loaned to Bury, where he revelled in the opportunity to play first-team football. At the end of his loan spell, and although Keegan planned to offer him a new contract, Dunfield asked to leave City.

Dunfield subsequently signed a three-year deal with Bury, where he made 74 league appearances during his time with the club. In January 2005, he suffered a broken kneecap in a game against Leyton Orient, and at the end of the season he was released. However, after seeing a specialist in North America, Dunfield underwent an operation and was told afterward that he would be able to play again in nine months. He spent the last four months of rehabilitation at Manchester City, and in July 2007 he completed his comeback by signing for Macclesfield Town after a trial period during pre-season. He went on to become the club's 2007–08 player of the season.

Dunfield signed for Shrewsbury Town in January 2009 for £65,000. His first season was considered stop-start, and he struggled to fit into his new team's style of play. However, his form improved the following season, and as a result he was handed his first full international cap by Canada.

After earning his cap, Dunfield was advised by Canadian manager Stephen Hart that he needed to be playing at a higher level than League Two if he had any aspirations of furthering his international career. As a result, a month after gaining his cap he was allowed to leave by new Shrewsbury manager Graham Turner. Turner said that he was "far from happy with the player basically implying that this club and English League Two football was not good enough for him."

While on trial with Motherwell of the Scottish Premier League, Dunfield was offered a contract by the Vancouver Whitecaps, which he accepted with the knowledge he could move to the MLS club in 2011.

On December 10, 2010, it was announced that Dunfield would be a member of Vancouver Whitecaps FC in Major League Soccer. After making 12 league appearances for the MLS club, Dunfield was traded to Toronto FC on July 14, 2011. Dunfield made his debut for Toronto on July 30 as a second half sub for Julian De Guzman against Portland Timbers, the game ended as a 2–2 away draw. Dunfield scored his first goal for Toronto in injury time against his former club, Vancouver Whitecaps FC, on July 11, 2012, clinching the 3–2 home victory.

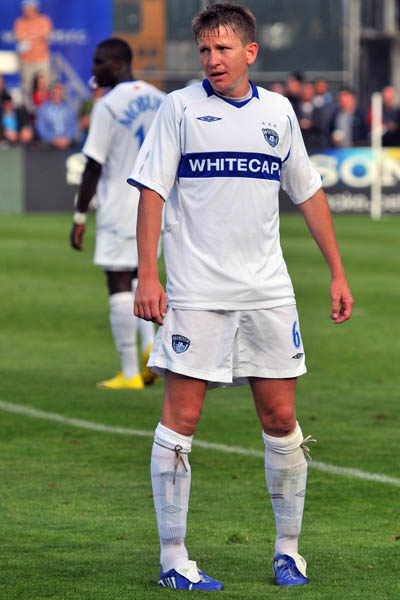
Dunfield with the Vancouver Whitecaps in 2010

Team officials named Dunfield the Toronto FC player of the year in 2012. Dunfield was waived in June 2013.

Dunfield signed with Oldham Athletic on February 20, 2014, until the end of the season after impressing on trial. Dunfield was released at the end of the 2013–14 season.

He signed for Scottish club Ross County in October 2014. Dunfield was one of 14 players released by Ross County at the end of the 2014–15 season.

For the 2016 season, he signed with Toronto Atomic FC in the Canadian Soccer League, where he recorded his first goal on June 25, 2016, against Scarborough SC. In his debut season he finished as the club's top goalscorer with eight goals.

== International career ==
Dunfield made his debut for Canada's senior team in a 1–1 draw against Venezuela on May 29, 2010. On June 1, 2011, Dunfield scored his first international goal in a 2–2 friendly match against Ecuador at BMO Field. On January 26, 2013, Dunfield was given the captaincy for the senior team in a friendly against Denmark; the match ended 4–0 in favour of Denmark.

=== International goals ===
Scores and results list Canada's goal tally first.

No.	Date	Venue	Opponent	Score	Result	Competition
1	June 1, 2011	BMO Field, Toronto, Canada	Ecuador	1–0	2–2	Friendly

== Coaching career ==
Dunfield eventually joined Toronto FC Academy as the head coach of its under-17s team. On June 26, 2023, he was named interim head coach of Toronto FC's first team after the dismissal of Bob Bradley.

In 2026, he was named the head coach for Pacific FC.

== Media career ==
Dunfield now works as a soccer analyst for TSN and colour commentator for OneSoccer.

== Honours ==
Toronto FC

- Canadian Championship: 2012
- 2012 Toronto FC MVP
