= Miguel Aceval =

Chilean footballer (born 1983)

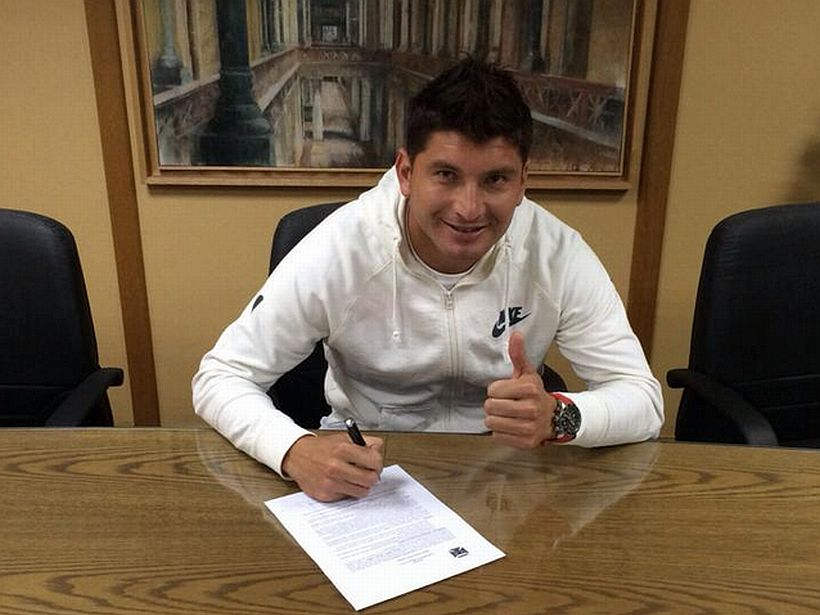

Personal information
- Full name: Miguel Ángel Aceval Muñoz
- Date of birth: 8 January 1983 (age 43)
- Place of birth: Santiago, Chile
- Height: 1.83 m (6 ft 0 in)
- Position: Centre back

Youth career
- Colo-Colo

Senior career*
Years	Team	Apps	(Gls)
2001–2007	Colo-Colo	159	(18)
2007	→ O'Higgins (loan)	18	(2)
2008	Huachipato	18	(3)
2009–2010	Unión Española	48	(9)
2011	Universidad de Concepción	30	(5)
2012	Toronto FC	5	(0)
2012–2013	Huachipato	18	(0)
2014–2015	Curicó Unido	46	(8)
2015–2018	Deportes Temuco	74	(9)
2019	San Antonio Unido	22	(2)
Total		438	(56)

International career
2011	Chile	1	(0)
- * Club domestic league appearances and goals

Miguel Ángel Aceval Muñoz (born 8 January 1983) is a Chilean former footballer who played as a centre back.

== Career ==
=== Professional ===
Aceval began in the youth system of Colo-Colo and made his professional debut on 18 August 2001 with Colo-Colo against Huachipato. While with Colo Colo, Aceval starts receiving acclaim for his long range shooting. After the 2006 Clausura championship with Colo-Colo, he made a loan move to O'Higgins before returning to Colo-Colo. While with Colo Colo, Aceval was a key player in helping the club to Chilean Primera División titles during the 2002 Clausura, 2006 Apertura, 2006 Clausura, and 2007 Clausura.

In 2008, Aceval went to play for a short spell with Uruguayan club Defensor Sporting, then he made his return to the Chilean league with Huachipato. After his brief spell with Huachipato, he signed with Unión Española. While with Unión Española, Aceval appeared in 48 league matches and scored 9 goals. For the 2011 season he joined Universidad de Concepción and scored 5 goals in 30 appearances.

Aceval left Chile at the end of the 2011 season signing with Toronto FC on 30 January 2012. He scored his first goal on a free kick for Toronto FC against Santos Laguna in the 2011–12 CONCACAF Champions League semifinals on 28 March 2012.

On 18 June 2012, Miguel Aceval, along with two other Toronto FC players, were arrested in Houston and charged with public intoxication. On 26 July, the club had announced that they had terminated Aceval's contract.

=== International ===
Aceval received his first call up and played for the Chile national team on 4 September 2011 in a friendly against Mexico.

== Honours ==
=== Club ===
Colo-Colo

- Primera División de Chile (4): 2002 Clausura, 2006 Apertura, 2006 Clausura, 2007 Clausura

Toronto FC

- Canadian Championship (1): 2012

Huachipato

- Primera División de Chile (1): 2012 Clausura
