= Ryan Johnson (footballer, born 1984) =

Jamaican footballer

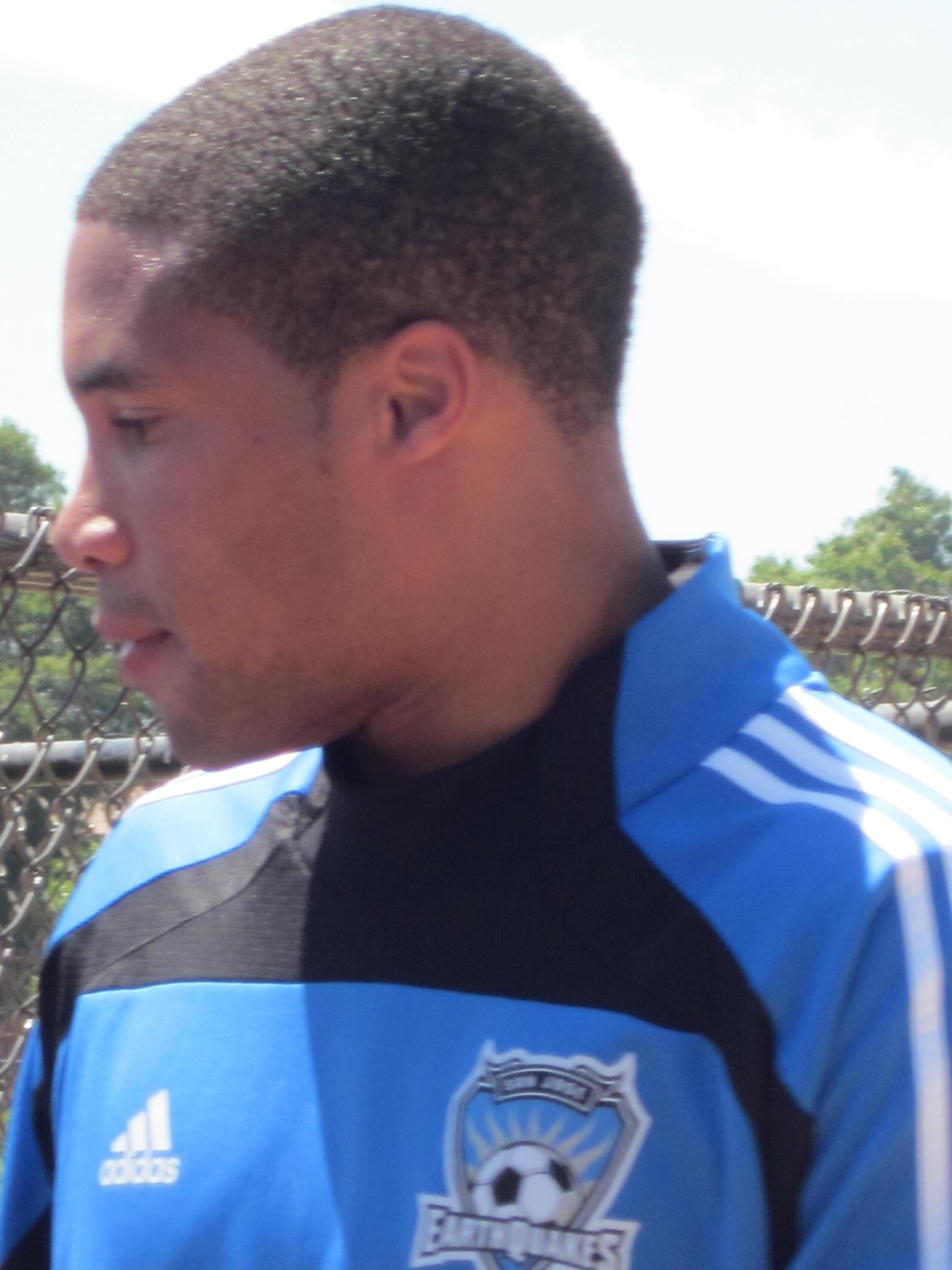
- Johnson in 2010

Personal information
- Date of birth: 26 November 1984 (age 41)
- Place of birth: Kingston, Jamaica
- Height: 6 ft 1 in (1.85 m)
- Position: Forward

College career
Years	Team	Apps	(Gls)
2002–2005	Oregon State Beavers	76	(18)

Senior career*
Years	Team	Apps	(Gls)
2002	Cape Cod Crusaders	6	(2)
2005	Boulder Rapids Reserve	9	(12)
2006	Real Salt Lake	7	(0)
2006	Chicago Fire	3	(0)
2007	Öster	14	(2)
2007–2008	New Jersey Ironmen (indoor)	14	(2)
2008–2011	San Jose Earthquakes	99	(17)
2011–2012	Toronto FC	43	(10)
2013	Portland Timbers	29	(9)
2014	Henan Jianye	28	(4)
2015	Seoul E-Land	31	(1)
2016	Rayo OKC	4	(1)
Total		287	(60)

International career
2006–2013	Jamaica	35	(8)
- * Club domestic league appearances and goals

Ryan Johnson (born 26 November 1984) is a Jamaican former professional footballer who played as a forward.

== Career ==
=== Youth and college ===
Johnson was born in Kingston, Jamaica and moved to the Boston area with his family while he was still an infant. He played high school soccer and basketball at Melrose High School in Massachusetts, where he was a Middlesex League and Eastern Mass League soccer all-star. He attended Oregon State University on a sports scholarship and played college soccer there from 2002 to 2005, where he scored 18 goals and assisted on 30 while appearing in 76 matches. He also spent two seasons in the USL Premier Development League, playing for Cape Cod Crusaders and Boulder Rapids Reserve.

=== Professional ===
Johnson was drafted in the third round, 26th overall, by Real Salt Lake in the 2006 MLS SuperDraft. On 25 July 2006, after only appearing in 7 matches with Salt Lake, Johnson was traded to Chicago Fire in exchange for Jack Stewart. In the remainder of the 2006 season, Johnson played 3 matches for the Fire and failed to agree on a new contract with the team at season's end.

In early 2007, he was on trial with various teams in Scandinavia and eventually got a short-term contract with Swedish side Östers IF (then at Superettan), that stretched from March 2007 to July 2007. Because Öster had a surplus of centre forwards at the time, they chose not to extend his contract any further and instead loaned Anatoli Ponomarev from GAIS. In 2007, he was on trial in FK Bodø/Glimt where he played one game against Leknes FK. He scored the last goal in the 8–1 win.

After a short stint playing indoor soccer with the New Jersey Ironmen, Johnson signed with San Jose Earthquakes for the 2008 MLS season. At the end of the 2009 MLS season, Johnson was named team MVP as the team's leading goalscorer.

On 14 July 2011, San Jose traded Johnson, an international roster spot, and allocation money to Toronto FC for Nana Attakora, Alan Gordon and Jacob Peterson. On 20 July Johnson made his debut for Toronto in a 1–0 home loss to FC Dallas. Three days later against Sporting Kansas City Johnson scored his first goal of the season for Toronto and assisted on a goal by newly acquired Danny Koevermans. The game ended as a 4–2 away defeat. On 2 August, in the return leg of the preliminary round of the CONCACAF Champions League, Johnson scored a superb volley in the 37th minute, followed by a goal in the 47th from a misplaced pass by the Real Esteli F.C. keeper. The two goals put Toronto FC into the group stage for the second straight year on an aggregate of 4–2.

Johnson continued his goal scoring form at the beginning of the 2012 season after scoring in both legs of the Champions League Quarter finals against Los Angeles Galaxy and against Seattle Sounders FC on 17 March. Johnson's goal against the Sounders earned him goal of the week. Johnson was awarded the George Gross Memorial Trophy as the 2012 Canadian Championship's best player.

Johnson was traded with Miloš Kocić to Portland Timbers on 12 December 2012 in exchange for Joe Bendik, a first-round pick in the 2013 MLS SuperDraft, and allocation money.

On 27 February 2014, Johnson transferred to Chinese Super League newcomer Henan Jianye.

The start of the 2015 season saw Ryan join new Korean K-League side Seoul E-Land FC under the tutelage of former Vancouver Whitecaps FC manager Martin Rennie and his assistant, ex-West Bromwich Albion and Celtic FC's Dan Harris.

In March 2016, Johnson signed for North American Soccer League side Rayo OKC. Johnson was released by Rayo OKC on 26 May 2016.

=== International ===
Johnson made his debut with the Jamaica national football team on 12 April 2006 in a friendly against the United States, playing the first 70 minutes. He was rewarded for his outstanding 2009 MLS season with a recall to the Jamaica national football team in January 2010 for a friendly match versus Canada and a February 2010 match versus Argentina. He scored his first national team goal in a 2–1 loss to Argentina in Mar del Plata on 10 February 2010. Johnson continued his strong performances with the national team by scoring the winning goal versus Costa Rica in September 2010.

== Career statistics ==
Appearances and goals by club, season and competition
Club	Season	League			National cup		Continental		Other		Total	
Club	Season	Division	Apps	Goals	Apps	Goals	Apps	Goals	Apps	Goals	Apps	Goals
Real Salt Lake	2006	MLS	7	0	—		—		—		7	0
Chicago Fire	2006	MLS	3	0	0	0	—		0	0	3	0
Öster	2007	Superettan	14	2	0	0	—		—		14	2
San Jose Earthquakes	2008	MLS	28	5	—		—		—		28	5
San Jose Earthquakes	2009	MLS	30	11	—		—		—		30	11
San Jose Earthquakes	2010	MLS	27	1	—		—		3	0	30	1
San Jose Earthquakes	2011	MLS	14	0	—		—		—		14	0
San Jose Earthquakes	Total		99	17	—		—		3	0	102	17
Toronto FC	2011	MLS	12	3	0	0	8	3	—		20	6
Toronto FC	2012	MLS	31	7	4	2	4	2	—		39	11
Toronto FC	Total		43	10	4	2	12	5	—		59	17
Portland Timbers	2013	MLS	29	9	2	0	4	1	4	1	39	12
Henan Jianye	2014	Chinese Super League	28	4	0	0	—		—		28	4
Seoul E-Land	2015	K League Challenge	31	1	2	0	—		—		22	1
Rayo OKC	2016	NASL	4	1	—		—		—		4	1
Career total			258	44	8	2	16	6	7	1	289	53

=== International ===
Appearances and goals by national team and year
National team	Year	Apps	Goals
Jamaica	2006	1	0
Jamaica	2010	10	3
Jamaica	2011	6	3
Jamaica	2012	12	2
Jamaica	2013	6	0
Total		35	8

Scores and results list Jamaica's goal tally first, score column indicates score after each Johnson goal.

List of international goals scored by Ryan Johnson
No.	Date	Venue	Opponent	Score	Result	Competition
1	10 February 2010	Estadio José María Minella, Mar del Plata, Argentina	Argentina	0 – 1	2–1	International Friendly
2	5 September 2010	Independence Park, Kingston, Jamaica	Costa Rica	1 – 0	1–0	International Friendly
3	29 November 2010	Stade En Camée, Rivière-Pilote, Martinique	Guadeloupe	2 – 0	2–0	2010 Caribbean Championship
4	7 June 2011	The Home Depot Center, Carson, United States	Grenada	2 – 0	4–0	2011 CONCACAF Gold Cup
5	13 June 2011	Red Bull Arena, Harrison, United States	Honduras	1 – 0	1–0	2011 CONCACAF Gold Cup
6	2 September 2011	Quito, Ecuador	Ecuador	2 – 4	2–5	International Friendly
7	24 February 2012	Montego Bay Sports Complex, Montego Bay, Jamaica	Cuba	1 – 0	3–0	International Friendly
8	8 June 2012	Independence Park, Kingston, Jamaica	Guatemala	2 – 0	2–1	2014 FIFA World Cup qualification

== Honours ==
=== Club ===
Toronto FC

- Canadian Championship (1): 2012

=== Individual ===
- George Gross Memorial Trophy: 2012
