= 2004 Voyageurs Cup =

2004 Coupe des Voyageurs (in French)

Tournament details
- Country: Canada
- Teams: 5

Final positions
- Champions: Montreal Impact (3rd title)
- Runners-up: Toronto Lynx

Tournament statistics
- Matches played: 20
- Goals scored: 55 (2.75 per match)
- Top goal scorer(s): Charles Gbeke (5 goals)

The 2004 Voyageurs Cup was the third Voyageurs Cup tournament which was started by the Canadian supporters group The Voyageurs. The 2004 edition of the competition featured the expansion Edmonton Aviators as well as the four 2003 teams: Calgary Storm (now Calgary Mustangs), Montreal Impact, Toronto Lynx and Vancouver Whitecaps.

Similar to the 2003 Voyageurs Cup competition Montreal Impact built up an early lead with three wins and a draw in the competition's first four games that the other teams could not overcome even though Montreal Impact only clinched their third consecutive Voyageurs Cup in their last match with a 2–0 over Edmonton FC on Aug. 25 (the competition's penultimate match).

== Format ==
The competition was set up on the league principle with each team playing two matches (home and away) against each other team for a total of eight matches per team. The entire competition totaled twenty matches. All matches were part of the 2004 USL A-League regular season with the last home and away matches included when more than two matches were played due to the unbalanced league schedule. In each match, 3 points are awarded for a win, 1 point is awarded for a draw, and 0 points are awarded for a loss. The five teams are ranked according to the total number of points obtained in all matches.

The team ranked highest after all matches have been played was the champion awarded the 2004 Voyageurs Cup.

== Standings ==
Pos	Team	Pld	W	D	L	GF	GA	GD	Pts	MTL	TOR	EDM	VAN	CAL
1	Montreal Impact	8	5	3	0	13	2	+11	18	—	1–1	2–0	0–0	2–0
2	Toronto Lynx	8	4	1	3	13	12	+1	13	0–2	—	3–1	2–0	2–1
3	Edmonton Aviators	8	3	2	3	11	14	−3	11	1–1	2–1	—	0–2	3–2
4	Vancouver Whitecaps FC	8	2	2	4	8	13	−5	8	0–3	3–1	2–3	—	1–1
5	Calgary Mustangs	8	1	2	5	10	14	−4	5	0–2	2–3	1–1	3–0	—

== Schedule ==
2004-05-29
18:00 EDT

Toronto Lynx	0–2	Montreal Impact
	Report	Frederick Commodore 14', 43'

Centennial Park Stadium
Toronto, Ontario, Canada
Attendance: 1,826
Referee: Jose Farias

2004-06-11
22:00 EDT

Vancouver Whitecaps	0–3	Montreal Impact
	Report	António Ribeiro 27'; JJ Bailey 44', 79'

Swangard Stadium
Vancouver, British Columbia, Canada
Attendance: 4,613
Referee: Michael Lambert

2004-06-13
16:00 EDT

Calgary Mustangs	0–2	Montreal Impact
	Report	Patrick Leduc 9' (pen.); Frederick Commodore 61'

McMahon Stadium
Calgary, Canada
Attendance: 879
Referee: Silviu Petrescu

2004-06-15
22:30 EDT

Edmonton F.C.	1–1	Montreal Impact
Jaime Lopresti 81'	Report	Darko Kolic 90'

Commonwealth Stadium
Edmonton, Canada
Attendance: 3,823
Referee: Joe Branco

2004-06-18
21:00 EDT

Calgary Mustangs	3–0	Vancouver Whitecaps
Conrad Smith 18', 41'; Mesut Mert 43'	Report

McMahon Stadium
Calgary, Canada
Attendance: 1,867
Referee: Bernhardssen

2004-06-20
16:00 EDT

Montreal Impact	1–1	Toronto Lynx
Mauricio Vincello 69'	Report	Darren Baxter 60'

Complexe sportif Claude-Robillard
Montreal, Quebec, Canada
Attendance: 9,289
Referee: Rob Aritle

2004-06-25
21:00 EDT

Calgary Mustangs	1–1	Edmonton F.C.
Jaime Auvigne 78' (pen.)	Report	Nikola Vignjevic 4'

McMahon Stadium
Calgary, Canada
Attendance: 3,198
Referee: Mauricio Navarro

2004-06-25
22:00 EDT

Vancouver Whitecaps	3–1	Toronto Lynx
Johnny Sulentic 62'; Oliver Heald 90' (pen.); Johnny Sulentic 90'	Report	Charles Gbeke 75'

Swangard Stadium
Vancouver, British Columbia, Canada
Attendance: 4,729
Referee: Tiger Lui

2004-07-04
22:00 EDT

Vancouver Whitecaps	2–3	Edmonton F.C.
Davide Xausa 14'; Alfredo Valente 24'	Report	Sean Fraser 45', 89'; Fred Akok 52'

Swangard Stadium
Vancouver, British Columbia, Canada
Attendance: 3,837
Referee: Steve Dipiero

2004-07-13
20:00 EDT

Edmonton F.C.	0–2	Vancouver Whitecaps
	Report	Davide Xausa 5', 66'

Commonwealth Stadium
Edmonton, Canada
Attendance: 1,983
Referee: Mauricio Navarro

2004-07-18
18:00 EDT

Toronto Lynx	2–1	Calgary Mustangs
Andres Arango 53'; Ali Gerba 91'	Report	Walter Otta 10'

Centennial Park Stadium
Toronto, Ontario, Canada
Attendance: 3,462
Referee: Simon Moreatroyd

2004-07-21
19:30 EDT

Montreal Impact	2–0	Calgary Mustangs
Eduardo Sebrango 23'; Zé Roberto 44'	Report

Complexe sportif Claude-Robillard
Montreal, Quebec, Canada
Attendance: 9,752
Referee: Dominic Rossetto

2004-07-25
16:00 EDT

Calgary Mustangs	2–3	Toronto Lynx
Conrad Smith 16'; Geert Brusselers 29'	Report	Gerba 9', 22'; Charles Gbeke 49'

McMahon Stadium
Calgary, Canada
Attendance: 1,736
Referee: Mauricio Navarro

2004-07-26
21:00 EDT

Edmonton F.C.	2–1	Toronto Lynx
Sipho Sibiya 38'; Chris Devlin 110'	Report	Charles Gbeke 68'

Commonwealth Stadium
Edmonton, Canada
Attendance: 473
Referee: John De La Cruz

2004-07-30
23:00 EDT

Vancouver Whitecaps	1–1	Calgary Mustangs
Jason Jordan 60'	Report	Steffen Holdt 90'

Swangard Stadium
Vancouver, British Columbia, Canada
Attendance: 4,853
Referee: David Gantar

2004-08-06
20:00 EDT

Montreal Impact	0–0	Vancouver Whitecaps
	Report

Complexe sportif Claude-Robillard
Montreal, Quebec, Canada
Attendance: 11,019
Referee: Steve DePiero

2004-08-07
19:30 EDT

Toronto Lynx	2–0	Vancouver Whitecaps
Darren Baxter 28'; Charles Gbeke 89'	Report

Centennial Park Stadium
Toronto, Ontario, Canada
Attendance: 2,358
Referee: Jeff Corrivault

2004-08-10
21:15 EDT

Edmonton F.C.	3–2	Calgary Mustangs
Fred Akok 30'; Sean Fraser 45'; Nikola Vignjević 110' (pen.)	Report	Mesut Mert 8'; Walter Otta 27'

Commonwealth Stadium
Edmonton, Canada
Attendance: 527
Referee: Paul Ward

2004-08-25
19:30 EDT

Montreal Impact	2–0	Edmonton F.C.
Zé Roberto 21'; Eduardo Sebrango 22'	Report

Complexe sportif Claude-Robillard
Montreal, Quebec, Canada
Attendance: 10,122
Referee: Jose Farias

2004-08-26
19:30 EDT

Toronto Lynx	3–1	Edmonton F.C.
Vinicius Brito 27'; Charles Gbeke 61'; Shawn Faria 67'	Report	Gordon Chin 75'

Centennial Park Stadium
Toronto, Ontario, Canada
Attendance: 2,075
Referee: Tiger Liu

=== Champion ===
Voyageurs Cup:
Montreal Impact
3rd Voyageurs Cup Win

== Top scorers ==
Rank	Player	Club	Goals
1	(Canada) Charles Gbeke	Toronto Lynx	5
2	(Ghana) Frederick Commodore	Montreal Impact	3
2	(Canada) Ali Gerba	Toronto Lynx	3
2	(Canada) Sean Fraser	Edmonton Aviators	3
2	(Trinidad and Tobago) Conrad Smith	Calgary Mustangs	3
2	(Canada) Davide Xausa	Vancouver Whitecaps	3
7	(Liberia) Fred Akok	Edmonton Aviators	2
7	(Brazil) Zé Roberto	Montreal Impact	2
7	(Cuba) Eduardo Sebrango	Montreal Impact	2
7	(Canada) Johnny Sulentic	Vancouver Whitecaps	2
7	(Trinidad and Tobago) Joel John Bailey	Montreal Impact	2
7	(England) Darren Baxter	Toronto Lynx	2
7	(Canada) Mesut Mert	Calgary Mustangs	2
7	(Argentina) Walter Otta	Calgary Mustangs	2
7	(Serbia and Montenegro) Nikola Vignjevic	Edmonton Aviators	2
16	(Canada) Andres Arango	Toronto Lynx	1
16	(Brazil) Vinicius Brito	Toronto Lynx	1
16	(Netherlands) Geert Brusselers	Calgary Mustangs	1
16	(Canada) Shawn Faria	Toronto Lynx	1
16	(Canada) Steffen Holdt	Calgary Mustangs	1
16	(Canada) Jason Jordan	Vancouver Whitecaps	1
16	(Canada) Patrick Leduc	Montreal Impact	1
16	(Canada) Gordon Chin	Edmonton Aviators	1
16	(Serbia and Montenegro) Darko Kolic	Montreal Impact	1
16	(Canada) Chris Devlin	Edmonton Aviators	1
16	(Canada) António Ribeiro	Montreal Impact	1
16	(Canada) Sipho Sibiya	Edmonton Aviators	1
16	(Canada) Alfredo Valente	Vancouver Whitecaps	1
16	(Canada) Oliver Heald	Vancouver Whitecaps	1
16	(Argentina) Mauricio Vincello	Montreal Impact	1
16	(Canada) Jamie Auvigne	Calgary Mustangs	1
16	(Chile) Jaime Lopresti	Edmonton Aviators	1
