= 2002 Voyageurs Cup =

2002 Coupe des Voyageurs (in French)

Tournament details
- Country: Canada
- Teams: 4

Final positions
- Champions: Montreal Impact (1st title)
- Runners-up: Toronto Lynx

Tournament statistics
- Matches played: 12
- Goals scored: 39 (3.25 per match)
- Top goal scorer(s): Nikola Budalic; Eduardo Sebrango (4 goals each)

The 2002 Voyageurs Cup was the inaugural Voyageurs Cup tournament which was started by the Canadian supporters group The Voyageurs. The 2002 Edition of the tournament saw four participating teams: Calgary Storm, Montreal Impact, Toronto Lynx and Vancouver Whitecaps.

The 2002 competition was dominated by the Toronto Lynx and Montreal Impact. Calgary was not competitive in the competition, and Vancouver lost two close games in July to Toronto and Montreal putting them too far behind the two frontrunners. Toronto led the competition with thirteen of a possible fifteen points after five of their six games. In Toronto's last game at home against Montreal Impact, they only need a draw to win the first Voyageurs Cup. Montreal, however, jumped out to an early 0–2 lead after seven minutes and held on for the win. Montreal Impact won their last three games of the competition, including 1–2 over Toronto, to overcome Toronto's lead and win the augural competition.

== Format ==
Each team played two matches (home and away) against each other team. All of these matches are drawn from the USL A-league's 2002 regular season; the final match played between each pair of teams in each city is counted as a Voyageurs Cup 2002 match. In each match, 3 points are awarded for wins (even if it comes in extra time), 1 point is awarded for a draw, and 0 points are awarded for losses (even if it comes in extra time). There are no bonus points awarded as there are in the A-league. In 2002 the A-League points system was 4 points for a win, 1 point for a draw, 0 points for a loss + 1 bonus point when scoring three or more goals in a game. The four teams are ranked according to the total number of points obtained in all Voyageurs Cup 2002 matches.

The team ranked highest after all matches have been played is the champion, and will be awarded the Voyageurs Cup.

=== Tiebreakers ===
If two or more teams are tied on points then they are ranked relative to each other by applying the following tiebreakers:

1. Number of points obtained in the Voyageurs Cup 2002 matches between the tied teams.
2. Goal difference in the Voyageurs Cup 2002 matches between the tied teams.
3. Number of goals scored in the Voyageurs Cup 2002 matches between the tied teams.
4. Number of away goals scored in the Voyageurs Cup 2002 matches between the tied teams.
5. Goal difference in all Voyageurs Cup 2002 matches.
6. Number of goals scored in all Voyageurs Cup 2002 matches.
7. Number of away goals scored in all Voyageurs Cup 2002 matches.
8. If exactly two teams are tied: Number of points obtained in all A-league 2002 regular season matches between the tied teams using the Voyageurs Cup 2002 point-scoring system.
9. If exactly two teams are tied: Goal difference in all A-league 2002 regular season matches between the tied teams.
10. If exactly two teams are tied: Number of away goals scored in all A-league 2002 regular season matches between the tied teams.
11. Number of points obtained in all A-league 2002 regular season matches using the A-league 2002 point-scoring system (4 points for a win, 1 point for a draw, 0 points for a loss, 1 bonus point for each match in which 3 or more goals are scored).
12. Goal difference in all A-league 2002 regular season matches.
13. Number of goals scored in all A-league 2002 regular season matches.
14. Number of away goals scored in all A-league 2002 regular season matches.
15. Stage reached in the A-league 2002 playoffs.
16. Goal difference in the furthest A-league 2002 playoff stage reached.
17. Number of goals scored in the furthest A-league 2002 playoff stage reached.
18. Number of away goals scored in the furthest A-league 2002 playoff stage reached.

== Standings ==
Team	Pts	Pld	W	D	L	GF	GA	GD
Montreal Impact	15	6	5	0	1	12	5	+7
Toronto Lynx	13	6	4	1	1	15	6	+9
Vancouver Whitecaps	7	6	2	1	3	8	8	0
Calgary Storm	0	6	0	0	6	4	20	−16

=== Results by round ===
Montreal Impact
Round	1	2	3	4	5	6
Ground	H	H	H	A	A	A
Result	W	W	L	W	W	W

Source: Voyageurs.ca
A = Away; H = Home; W = Win; D = Draw; L = Loss

Toronto Lynx
Round	1	2	3	4	5	6
Ground	H	H	A	A	H	H
Result	W	W	W	D	W	L

Source: Voyageurs.ca
A = Away; H = Home; W = Win; D = Draw; L = Loss

Vancouver 86ers
Round	1	2	3	4	5	6
Ground	H	A	A	H	A	H
Result	W	L	L	D	W	L

Source: Voyageurs.ca
A = Away; H = Home; W = Win; D = Draw; L = Loss

Calgary Storm
Round	1	2	3	4	5	6
Ground	A	A	A	H	H	H
Result	L	L	L	L	L	L

Source: Voyageurs.ca
A = Away; H = Home; W = Win; D = Draw; L = Loss

== Schedule ==
2002-06-15
19:30

Toronto Lynx	4–2	Calgary Storm
Kojic 10'; Vincello 55'; Budalic 66'; Budalic 74'	Report; Report	Heidler 3'; Pavicic 14'

Centennial Park Stadium
Toronto, Ontario
Attendance: 1,118
Referee: Jose Farias

2002-06-16

Montreal Impact	1–0	Calgary Storm
Sebrango 22'

Complexe sportif Claude-Robillard
Montreal, Quebec

2002-07-14

Vancouver Whitecaps	4–0	Calgary Storm
Kindel 33'; Thompson 45'; Clarke 49'; Thompson 68'

Swangard Stadium
Vancouver, British Columbia

2002-07-17

Montreal Impact	2–1	Vancouver Whitecaps
Biello 20'; DiTullio 56'		Lyall 36'

Complexe sportif Claude-Robillard
Montreal, Quebec

2002-07-19
18:30

Toronto Lynx	1–0	Vancouver Whitecaps
Mattacchione 59'	Report

Centennial Park Stadium
Toronto, Ontario
Attendance: 1,059
Referee: Neil Schofield

2002-07-30
20:30

Calgary Storm	0–6	Toronto Lynx
	Report	Faria 7'; Budalic 24'; Budalic 37'; Aristodemo 45+2'; Thomas 53'; Serioux 69'

McMahon Stadium
Calgary, Alberta
Attendance: 1,012

2002-08-02

Vancouver Whitecaps	1–1	Toronto Lynx
Jordan 22'		Lucas 48'

Swangard Stadium
Vancouver, British Columbia

2002-08-07
19:30

Montreal Impact	1–2	Toronto Lynx
Gervais 57'	Report	Lucas 73'; Penalillo 110'

Complexe sportif Claude-Robillard
Montreal, Quebec
Attendance: 7,653

2002-08-15

Calgary Storm	1–2	Vancouver Whitecaps
Dutra 16'		Thompson 46'; Heald 66'

McMahon Stadium
Calgary, Alberta

2002-08-18
18:00

Toronto Lynx	1–2	Montreal Impact
Lucas 15'	Report; Report	Sebrango 3'; Zé Roberto 7'

Centennial Park Stadium
Toronto, Ontario
Attendance: 3,253
Referee: Silviu Petrescu

2002-08-23

Calgary Storm	1–3	Montreal Impact
Lemire 48'		Sebrango 48'; Zé Roberto 90+5'; DeSantis 90+7'

McMahon Stadium
Calgary, Alberta

2002-08-25

Vancouver Whitecaps	0–3	Montreal Impact
		Zé Roberto 27'; Bernier 62'; Sebrango 80'

Swangard Stadium
Vancouver, British Columbia

=== Champion ===
Voyageurs Cup:
Montreal Impact
1st Voyageurs Cup Win

== Top scorers ==
Rank	Player	Club	Goals
1	(Canada) Nikola Budalic	Toronto Lynx	4
1	(Cuba) Eduardo Sebrango	Montreal Impact	4
3	(Barbados) Ryan Lucas	Toronto Lynx	3
3	(Brazil) Zé Roberto	Montreal Impact	3
3	(Canada) Niall Thompson	Vancouver Whitecaps	3
6	(Canada) Robbie Aristodemo	Toronto Lynx	1
6	(Canada) Patrice Bernier	Montreal Impact	1
6	(Canada) Mauro Biello	Montreal Impact	1
6	(Canada) Jeff Clarke	Vancouver Whitecaps	1
6	(Canada) Nick DeSantis	Montreal Impact	1
6	(Canada) Jason DiTullio	Montreal Impact	1
6	(Canada) Waldemar Dutra	Calgary Storm	1
6	(Canada) Shawn Faria	Toronto Lynx	1
6	(Canada) Gabriel Gervais	Montreal Impact	1
6	(Canada) Ollie Heald	Vancouver Whitecaps	1
6	(Germany) Peter Heidler	Calgary Storm	1
6	(Canada) Jason Jordan	Vancouver Whitecaps	1
6	(Canada) Steve Kindel	Vancouver Whitecaps	1
6	(Canada) Milan Kojic	Toronto Lynx	1
6	(Canada) Chris Lemire	Calgary Storm	1
6	(Canada) Geordie Lyall	Vancouver Whitecaps	1
6	(Canada) Joe Mattacchione	Toronto Lynx	1
6	(Canada) Mike Pavicic	Calgary Storm	1
6	(Peru) Julio Penalillo	Toronto Lynx	1
6	(Canada) Adrian Serioux	Toronto Lynx	1
6	(Canada) Elvis Thomas	Toronto Lynx	1
6	(Argentina) Mauricio Vincello	Toronto Lynx	1
