= 2003 Voyageurs Cup =

2003 Coupe des Voyageurs (in French)

Tournament details
- Country: Canada
- Teams: 4

Final positions
- Champions: Montreal Impact (2nd title)
- Runners-up: Toronto Lynx

Tournament statistics
- Matches played: 12
- Goals scored: 30 (2.5 per match)
- Top goal scorer(s): Ali Gerba (5 goals)

The 2003 Voyageurs Cup was the second Voyageurs Cup tournament which was started by the Canadian supporters group The Voyageurs. The 2003 Edition of the tournament featured the same four teams as the 2002 tournament: Calgary Storm, Montreal Impact, Toronto Lynx and Vancouver Whitecaps.

The 2003 competition was won by Montreal Impact who led the competition with wins in their first three games. Neither Toronto Lynx nor Vancouver Whitecaps could overcome their lead. However, Montreal did not clinch their second Voyageurs Cup until the last game of the competition against Calgary, on August 31, with a 2–0 win at home.

== Format ==
Each team played two matches (home and away) against each other team. All of these matches are drawn from the USL A-league's 2003 regular season; the final two matches played between each city's team are counted as a Voyageurs Cup 2003 match. In each match, 3 points are awarded for wins (even if it comes in extra time), 1 point is awarded for a draw, and 0 points are awarded for losses (even if it comes in extra time). The four teams are ranked according to the total number of points obtained in all matches.

The team ranked highest after all matches have been played is the champion, and will be awarded the Voyageurs Cup.

== Standings ==
2003-Team	Pts	Pld	W	L	T	GF	GA	GD
Montreal Impact	13	6	4	1	1	12	4	+8
Toronto Lynx	12	6	4	2	0	9	7	+2
Vancouver Whitecaps	10	6	3	2	1	7	5	+2
Calgary Mustangs	0	6	0	6	0	2	14	−12

=== Results by round ===
Montreal Impact
Round	1	2	3	4	5	6
Ground	A	A	A	H	H	H
Result	W	W	W	L	D	W

Source: Voyageurs.ca
A = Away; H = Home; W = Win; D = Draw; L = Loss

Toronto Lynx
Round	1	2	3	4	5	6
Ground	H	A	A	A	H	H
Result	L	W	W	W	L	W

Source: Voyageurs.ca
A = Away; H = Home; W = Win; D = Draw; L = Loss

Vancouver Whitecaps
Round	1	2	3	4	5	6
Ground	H	H	H	A	A	H
Result	L	L	W	W	D	W

Source: Voyageurs.ca
A = Away; H = Home; W = Win; D = Draw; L = Loss

Calgary Storm
Round	1	2	3	4	5	6
Ground	H	H	A	H	A	A
Result	L	L	L	L	L	L

Source: Voyageurs.ca
A = Away; H = Home; W = Win; D = Draw; L = Loss

== Schedule ==
2003-05-10
16:00

Toronto Lynx	0–2	Montreal Impact
	Report; Report	Zé Roberto 30'; Zé Roberto 52'

Centennial Park Stadium
Toronto, Ontario
Attendance: 2,555
Referee: Mauricio Navarro

2003-05-30

Vancouver Whitecaps	0–1	Montreal Impact
		Francois 76'

Swangard Stadium
Vancouver, British Columbia

2003-06-01

Calgary Storm	0–4	Montreal Impact
		Biello 19'; Matondo 29'; Clarke 30'; Sebrango 82'

McMahon Stadium
Calgary, Alberta

2003-06-28

Vancouver Whitecaps	1–2	Toronto Lynx
Heald 33'		Gerba 39'; Gerba 43'

Swangard Stadium
Vancouver, British Columbia

2003-07-01
20:30

Calgary Storm	0–2	Toronto Lynx
	Report	Gerba 6'; Vignjevic 17'

McMahon Stadium
Calgary, Alberta
Attendance: 1,500

2003-07-16
19:30

Montreal Impact	2–3	Toronto Lynx
Sebrango 33'; Matondo 72'	Report; Report	Vignjevic 49'; Gerba 90'; Gerba 102'

Complexe sportif Claude-Robillard
Montreal, Quebec
Attendance: 8,237
Referee: Ryan Feron

2003-07-24

Vancouver Whitecaps	2–0	Calgary Storm
Craveiro 8'; Heald 37'

Swangard Stadium
Vancouver, British Columbia

2003-08-04

Calgary Storm	1–2	Vancouver Whitecaps
Zuniga 21'		Jordan 79'; Corazzin 81'

McMahon Stadium
Calgary, Alberta

2003-08-06

Montreal Impact	1–1	Vancouver Whitecaps
Zé Roberto 15'		Dasovic 77'

Complexe sportif Claude-Robillard
Montreal, Quebec

2003-08-08
19:30

Toronto Lynx	0–1	Vancouver Whitecaps
	Report; Report	Corazzin 58'

Centennial Park Stadium
Toronto, Ontario
Attendance: 2,364
Referee: Tiger Liu

2003-08-29
20:00

Toronto Lynx	2–1	Calgary Storm
Barclay 16'; Vincello 63'	Report	Wimble 65'

Centennial Park Stadium
Toronto, Ontario
Attendance: 3, 216
Referee: Angelo Gertsakis

2003-08-31

Montreal Impact	2–0	Calgary Storm
Leduc 5'; Nash 25'

Complexe sportif Claude-Robillard
Montreal, Quebec

=== Champion ===
Voyageurs Cup:
Montreal Impact
2nd Voyageurs Cup Win

== Top scorers ==
Rank	Player	Club	Goals
1	(Canada) Ali Gerba	Toronto Lynx	5
2	(Cuba) Eduardo Sebrango	Montreal Impact	3
2	(Brazil) Zé Roberto	Montreal Impact	3
4	(Canada) Carlo Corazzin	Vancouver Whitecaps	2
4	(Canada) Sita-Taty Matondo	Montreal Impact	2
4	(Serbia and Montenegro) Nikola Vignjevic	Toronto Lynx	2
4	(Canada) Oliver Heald	Vancouver Whitecaps	2
8	(Canada) Mauro Biello	Montreal Impact	1
8	(Argentina) Sebastian Barclay	Toronto Lynx	1
8	(Canada) Nico Craveiro	Vancouver Whitecaps	1
8	(Canada) Nick Dasovic	Vancouver Whitecaps	1
8	(Canada) Abraham Francois	Montreal Impact	1
8	(Canada) Jason Jordan	Vancouver Whitecaps	1
8	(Canada) Patrick Leduc	Montreal Impact	1
8	(Canada) Martin Nash	Montreal Impact	1
8	(Argentina) Mauricio Vincello	Toronto Lynx	1
8	(England) Shaun Wimble	Calgary Storm	1
8	(Canada) Nicolas Zuniga	Calgary Storm	1
