= 2005 Vancouver Whitecaps FC season =

Vancouver Whitecaps FC 2005 soccer season

Vancouver Whitecaps FC
2005 season
- Chairman: Greg Kerfoot
- Head coach: Bob Lilley
- USL First Division: 3rd
- USL–1 Playoffs: Play-In Round
- Voyageurs Cup: 2nd
- Highest home attendance: 6,192; Sept 11 vs MTL
- Lowest home attendance: 2,440; July 9 (Apple Bowl) vs POR
- Average home league attendance: 5,102
Home colours	Away colours

The 2005 Vancouver Whitecaps FC season was the club's 19th year of play (or 29th if counting the NASL Whitecaps), as well as their 13th as a Division 2 club in the franchise model of US-based soccer leagues. They played in the now defunct USL First Division which in 2005 was rebranded from A-League and was the highest level of Canadian club soccer. 2005 was Bob Lilley's first season as head coach after Tony Fonseca was released to take on the new District Development Centre Technical Director position with the BCSA. Under Tony Fonseca the Whitecaps had playoffs qualifications three straight years and advanced to the semifinals once. Part of the re-organization of BC youth soccer involved the Whitecaps expanding their youth program to ten Super Y League teams. The Whitecaps were one of only a few US or Canadian clubs with a complete youth system. MLS teams in 2005 did not have as extensive a club structure.

They started the season strongly going undefeated in their first six matches. The Whitecaps were hard to beat all year and finished third in the league table. This was the ninth consecutive playoff appearance for the Whitecaps. In the playoffs Vancouver had a play-in round series against Richmond Kickers and couldn't find a way to score with both legs of the series finishing 0-0, the Kickers advanced on penalty kicks. Jason Jordan was named league most value player with seventeen goals.

The name of the league was not the only thing that changed in 2005, so did the league format, from two conferences to a single table. The schedule was not balanced; it was home and away against every team in the league with additional matches against Seattle, Portland, and Minnesota. Head to head results were the first tie-breaker. Average attendance increased for the fourth year in a row and was above 5,000 for the first time since 2001. Three double-headers were played with the Whitecaps Women of the USL W-League.

Off the field, 2005 was the first year (counting NASL Whitecaps) since 1984 that all home and away games had live radio broadcasts. The games had a thirty-minute pre and post game show, and the AM sports radio station also carried a sixty-minute weekly soccer program early Saturday mornings. The Whitecaps featured on a weekly local soccer show on Saturday at 2 p.m. as well as on Fox Soccer World twice via the United Soccer League agreement for sixteen weeks of coverage June 17 to October 1. The partnership with the BCSA for the mid-season friendly with Sunderland A.F.C. was also a success with the largest crowd in five years – 6,857 watching the Whitecaps win 3 – 0. The Whitecaps played one of their double headers (Women's and Men's teams) at the Apple Bowl in Kelowna, BC on July 9, 2005. The club also unveiled renderings and details of its Whitecaps Waterfront Stadium proposal publicly on October 13, 2005. They also had plans announced in 2004, for a training centre for their men's, women's, and youth teams to be shared with the Canadian Women's National Team at Simon Fraser University that had been on hold other than artificial turf field upgrades.

== League Tables ==
Pos	Team	Pld	W	L	T	GF	GA	GD	Pts	Qualification
1	Montreal Impact (S)	28	18	3	7	37	15	+22	61	Semifinal of playoffs
2	Rochester Raging Rhinos	28	15	7	6	45	27	+18	51	Semifinal of playoffs
3	Vancouver Whitecaps	28	12	7	9	37	21	+16	45	First round of playoffs
4	Seattle Sounders (C)	28	11	6	11	33	25	+8	44	First round of playoffs
5	Portland Timbers	28	10	9	9	40	42	−2	39 (Note: POR: 4 pts; RIC: 1 pt)	First round of playoffs
6	Richmond Kickers	28	10	9	9	28	30	−2	39	First round of playoffs
7	Puerto Rico Islanders	28	10	10	8	46	43	+3	38	
8	Atlanta Silverbacks	28	10	15	3	40	52	−12	33	
9	Charleston Battery	28	9	14	5	27	36	−9	32	
10	Minnesota Thunder	28	7	11	10	37	42	−5	31	
11	Virginia Beach Mariners	28	7	14	7	26	39	−13	28	
12	Toronto Lynx	28	3	17	8	26	50	−24	17	

(C) Champions; (S) Commissioner's Cup (regular season winner)
Notes:

Expanded Table

Overall								Home						Away					
Pld	Pts	W	L	T	GF	GA	GD	W	L	T	GF	GA	GD	W	L	T	GF	GA	GD
28	45	12	7	9	36	21	+15	9	1	4	26	7	+19	3	6	5	10	14	−4

Last updated: April 26, 2006
Source: uslsoccer.com
Pld = Matches played; Pts = Points; W = Matches won; T = Matches tied; L = Matches lost; GF = Goals for; GA = Goals against; GD = Goal difference

== Pre-season ==
Win Draw Loss

The Whitecaps opened their four-week training camp on March 25, 2005 at Surrey's Newton Athletic Park although most sessions were at Simon Fraser University's Terry Fox Field. The preseason schedule was announced March 1, 2005. Note no record can be found of the first match listed and archived whitecapsfc.com headlines imply the match was cancelled.

April 2, 2005	UVic Vikes	0 – 1	Vancouver Whitecaps FC	Victoria, British Columbia
19:00 PST			Goal	Stadium: Centennial Stadium,

April 5, 2005	VMSL All-Stars	2 – 4	Vancouver Whitecaps FC	Tsawwassen, British Columbia
18:30 PST	Chris Clarke; Johnny Sulentic		Jason Jordan; Steve Klein; Said Ali	Stadium: Brandrith Park

April 9, 2005	Trinity Western University	0 – 1	Vancouver Whitecaps FC	Langley, British Columbia
15:00 PST		Report	Said Ali 92'	Stadium: Spartans Sports Complex; Attendance: 1,000

April 16, 2005	Vancouver Whitecaps FC	1 – 0	Seattle Sounders	Chilliwack, British Columbia
19:00 PST	Carlo Corazzin 16'	Report		Stadium: Exhibition Park; Attendance: 2,000

== USL-1 ==
=== Results by round ===
Round	1	2	3	4	5	6	7	8	9	10	11	12	13	14	15	16	17	18	19	20	21	22	23	24	25	26	27	28
Ground	H	H	A	H	H	H	A	H	A	A	A	A	H	A	H	A	H	H	A	A	A	H	H	H	A	A	A	H
Result	D	W	D	W	W	W	L	W	L	L	W	D	D	D	W	D	W	D	L	W	D	D	W	W	L	W	L	L

Source: uslsoccer.com
A = Away; H = Home; W = Win; D = Draw; L = Loss

April

April 24, 2005 1 Voyageurs Cup	Vancouver Whitecaps FC	0 – 0	Toronto Lynx	Burnaby, BC
22:00 ET		Report		Stadium: Swangard Stadium; Attendance: 5,722; Referee: Paul Ward

April 30, 2005 2	Vancouver Whitecaps FC	1 – 0	Rochester Rhinos	Burnaby, BC
22:00 ET	Carlo Corazzin 51' (pen.)	Report		Stadium: Swangard Stadium; Attendance: 4,862; Referee: Domenic Scali

May

May 7, 2005 3	Seattle Sounders	0 – 0	Vancouver Whitecaps FC	Seattle, WA
20:00 ET		Report		Stadium: Qwest Field; Attendance: 2,495; Referee: Ben Chouaf

May 15, 2005 4	Vancouver Whitecaps FC	4 – 0	Charleston Battery	Burnaby, BC
22:00 ET	Jason Jordan 29', 49', 55', 77'	Report		Stadium: Swangard Stadium; Attendance: 4,296; Referee: Tiger Liu

May 22, 2005 5	Vancouver Whitecaps FC	4 – 1	Atlanta Silverbacks	Burnaby, BC
22:00 ET	Jason Jordan 15', 30', 50'; Joey Gjertsen 54'	Report	Alex Pineda Chacón 87'	Stadium: Swangard Stadium; Attendance: 4,872; Referee: Silviu Petrescu

May 27, 2005 6	Vancouver Whitecaps FC	3 – 1	Virginia Beach Mariners	Burnaby, BC
22:00 ET	Tino Cucca 30'; Jason Jordan 30'; Steve Klein 56'	Report	David Castellanos 16'	Stadium: Swangard Stadium; Attendance: 4,511; Referee: David Gantar

May 29, 2005 7	Minnesota Thunder	1 – 0	Vancouver Whitecaps FC	Saint Paul, Minnesota
20:05 ET	Godfrey Tenoff 24'	Report		Stadium: James Griffin Stadium; Attendance: 3,312; Referee: Jeff Hink

June

June 10, 2005 8	Vancouver Whitecaps FC	3 – 2	Portland Timbers	Burnaby, BC
22:00 ET	Alfredo Valente 39' (pen.); Martin Nash 40'; Steve Klein 90+'	Report	Tom Poltl 78'; Edwin Miranda 90+'	Stadium: Swangard Stadium; Attendance: 5,337; Referee: Steve Depiero

June 18, 2005 9	Atlanta Silverbacks	3 – 2	Vancouver Whitecaps FC	Clarkston, Georgia
17:30 ET	Fabian Dawkins 4'; Alex Pineda Chacón 7'; Adilson DeLima 36'	Report	David Morris 9'; Steve Klein 26' (pen.)	Stadium: DeKalb Memorial Stadium; Attendance: 2,315; Referee: Brian D'Amato

June 19, 2005 10	Charleston Battery	2 – 0	Vancouver Whitecaps FC	Charleston, South Carolina
18:00 ET	Usiel Vasquez 21'; Jesus Martinez 67'	Report		Stadium: Blackbaud Stadium; Attendance: 3,006; Referee: Guy Goodrich

June 22, 2005 11	Puerto Rico Islanders	1 – 2	Vancouver Whitecaps FC	Bayamón, Puerto Rico
20:00 ET	Petter Villegas 35'	Report	Ian Fuller 5'; Steve Klein 43' (pen.)	Stadium: Juan Ramón Loubriel Stadium; Attendance: 4,357; Referee: Tony Russo

June 25, 2005 12	Seattle Sounders	1 – 1	Vancouver Whitecaps FC	Seattle
22:00 ET	Ryan Edwards 64'	Report	Steve Kindel 19'	Stadium: Qwest Field; Attendance: 2,696; Referee: Colin Arblaster

June 26, 2005 13	Vancouver Whitecaps FC	0 – 0	Seattle Sounders	Burnaby, BC
22:00 ET		Report		Stadium: Swangard Stadium; Attendance: 5,722; Referee: Daniel Belleau

July

July 2, 2005 14	Portland Timbers	1 – 1	Vancouver Whitecaps FC	Portland, Oregon
22:00 ET	Byron Alvarez 7'	Report	Jason Jordan 37'	Stadium: PGE Park; Attendance: 3,944; Referee: Jonathan Lavergne

July 9, 2005 15	Vancouver Whitecaps FC	4 – 0	Portland Timbers	Kelowna, BC
22:00 ET	Jeff Clarke 34'; Steve Klein 36', 82'; Joey Gjertsen 39'	Report		Stadium: Apple Bowl; Attendance: 2,440; Referee: David Gantar

July 14, 2005 16	Portland Timbers	1 – 1	Vancouver Whitecaps FC	Portland, Oregon
22:00 ET	Scot Thompson 31'	Report	Steve Klein 89'	Stadium: PGE Park; Attendance: 5,523; Referee: Ricardo Valezuela

July 24, 2005 17	Vancouver Whitecaps FC	2 – 1	Minnesota Thunder	Burnaby, BC
22:00 ET	Jason Jordan 73', 90'	Report	James Alberts 51'	Stadium: Swangard Stadium; Attendance: 5,937; Referee: Carol Anne Chenard

July 29, 2005 18	Vancouver Whitecaps FC	0 – 0	Seattle Sounders	Burnaby, BC
23:00 ET		Report		Stadium: Swangard Stadium; Attendance: 5,434; Referee: Justin Tasev

August

August 6, 2005 19	Virginia Beach Mariners	2 – 0	Vancouver Whitecaps FC	Virginia Beach, Virginia
19:30 ET	Hamisi Amani-Dove 33' (pen.); John Barry Nusum 51'	Report		Stadium: Virginia Beach Sportsplex; Attendance: 2,112; Referee: Brent Sorg

August 7, 2005 20	Richmond Kickers	0 – 2	Vancouver Whitecaps FC	Richmond, Virginia
18:00 ET		Report	Jason Jordan 16', 30'	Stadium: Richmond City Stadium; Attendance: 2,011; Referee: Reggie Rutty

August 10, 2005 21	Minnesota Thunder	0 – 0	Vancouver Whitecaps FC	Saint Paul, Minnesota
20:05 ET		Report		Stadium: James Griffin Stadium; Attendance: 2,957; Referee: Doug Damico

August 14, 2005 22	Vancouver Whitecaps FC	1 – 1	Richmond Kickers	Burnaby, BC
22:00 ET	Ian Fuller 64'	Report	Tim Brown 67'	Stadium: Swangard Stadium; Attendance: 4,875; Referee: Mauricio Navarro

August 20, 2005 23	Vancouver Whitecaps FC	3 – 0	Minnesota Thunder	Burnaby, BC
22:00 ET	Martin Nash 34'; Jason Jordan 36', 77'	Report		Stadium: Swangard Stadium; Attendance: 5,185; Referee: Mike Lambert

August 27, 2005 24	Vancouver Whitecaps FC	2 – 0	Puerto Rico Islanders	Burnaby, BC
22:00 ET	Jason Jordan 55', 71'	Report		Stadium: Swangard Stadium; Attendance: 5,817; Referee: Jonathan Lavergne

August 31, 2005 25 Voyageurs Cup	Montreal Impact	1 – 0	Vancouver Whitecaps FC	Montreal
19:30 ET	Antonio Ribeiro 5'	Report		Stadium: Complexe sportif Claude-Robillard; Attendance: 8,917; Referee: Steve Depiero

September

September 2, 2005 26 Voyageurs Cup	Toronto Lynx	0 – 1	Vancouver Whitecaps FC	Etobicoke, Ontario
20:00 ET		Report	Joey Gjertsen 59'	Stadium: Centennial Park Stadium; Attendance: 1,587; Referee: Domenic Scali

September 4, 2005 27	Rochester Rhinos	1 – 0	Vancouver Whitecaps FC	Rochester, New York
18:05 ET	Rene Rivas 4' (pen.)	Report		Stadium: Frontier Field; Attendance: 9,513; Referee: Vladimir Fabre

September 11, 2005 28 Voyageurs Cup	Montreal Impact	0 – 1	Vancouver Whitecaps FC	Burnaby, BC
19:00 ET		Report	Eduardo Sebrango 10'	Stadium: Swangard Stadium; Attendance: 6,192; Referee: Silvio Petrescu

=== Post-season ===
Play-in Round

September 16, 2005 Leg 1	Richmond Kickers	0 – 0	Vancouver Whitecaps FC	Richmond, Virginia
22:00 ET		Report		Stadium: Richmond City Stadium; Attendance: 2,476; Referee: Joe Cardecio

September 18, 2005 Leg 2	Vancouver Whitecaps FC	0 – 0 (4 – 5 p)	Richmond Kickers	Burnaby, BC
22:00 ET		Report		Stadium: Swangard Stadium; Attendance: 5,332; Referee: Steve De Piero
	Penalties
	Carlo Corazzin (penalty scored); Chris Franks (penalty missed); Martin Nash (penalty scored); Steve Kindel (penalty scored); Nick Dasovic (penalty scored)		(penalty scored) Robert Ssjjemba; (penalty scored) Matthew Delicate; (penalty scored) Sascha Gorres; (penalty scored) Joey Worthen; (penalty scored) Kevin Jeffrey

=== Voyageurs Cup ===
Prior to 2008, from when it has been awarded to the Canadian Championship winners, the men's title was decided on regular-season matches between Canada's USL First Division sides.

Pos	Team	Pld	W	D	L	GF	GA	GD	Pts
1	Montreal Impact	4	4	0	0	5	1	+4	12
2	Vancouver Whitecaps FC	4	1	1	2	1	2	−1	4
3	Toronto Lynx	4	0	1	3	1	4	−3	1

=== Cascadia Cup ===
Standings
Team	Pld	W	L	D	GF	GA	GD	Pts
Vancouver Whitecaps	8	2	0	6	10	5	+5	12
Portland Timbers	8	2	3	3	10	15	−5	9
Seattle Sounders	8	1	2	5	7	7	0	8

Source: "Cascadia Cup". cascadiacup.soccer. January 2005.

== Mid-Season Friendly ==
Sunderland A.F.C. did a preseason tour with matches against the Vancouver Whitecaps, Seattle Sounders, and Portland Timbers from July 16 – 23, 2005.

July 16, 2005	Vancouver Whitecaps FC	3 – 0	Sunderland A.F.C.	Burnaby, BC
19:00 ET	Carlo Corazzin 51'; Joey Gjertsen 58'; Jason Jordan 83'	Report		Stadium: Swangard Stadium; Attendance: 6,857; Referee: Paul Ward

== Staff ==
- President – John Rocha
- General Manager – Bob Lenarduzzi
- Office Manager – Lindsay Puchlik
- Communication Manager – Nathan Vanstone
- Director Sales and Marketing – Rick Ramsbottom
- Men's Head Coach – Bob Lilley
- Men's Assistant Coach – Michael Toshack
- Reserve Team Men's Head Coach –
- Women's Head Coach – Patrick Rohla
- Reserve Team Women's Head Coach –
- Director Youth Operations – Dan Lenarduzzi

== Roster ==
The Whitecaps released 2004 rookie defender Justin Thompson, eight year Whitecap veteran forward Oliver Heald, and defender Nico Craveiro. Justin Thompson played in Europe before playing two seasons for rival Portland Timbers.

The Whitecaps signed Canadian international defender Mark Watson in December 2004. Midfielder Steve Klein was also signed in the offseason. At the end of the season, Nick Dasovic, Chris and Mike Franks, and Kevin Harmse all moved on from the Whitecaps.

Jason Jordan scored seventeen goals to win the USL-1 golden boot while Martin Nash was ninth in assists with five and played in every game of the year.
