= List of CF Montréal seasons =

Canadian soccer club CF Montréal (known as the Montreal Impact until 2020) has competed in Major League Soccer since 2012. Prior to becoming an MLS club, Montreal competed in a variety of second-division American leagues from their foundation in 1992. The following list summarizes the results for both the predecessor and successor clubs, with totals including statistics from both iterations of the Impact.

== Key ==
Key to competitions

- Major League Soccer (MLS) – The top-flight of soccer in the United States, established in 1996.
- North American Soccer League (NASL) – The second division of soccer in the United States from 2011 through 2017, now defunct.
- USSF Division 2 Professional League (D2 Pro) – The second division of soccer in the United States for a single season in 2010, now defunct.
- USL First Division (USL-1) – The second division of soccer in the United States from 2005 through 2009.
- A-League – The second division of soccer in the United States from 1995 through 2004, now defunct.
- American Professional Soccer League (APSL) – The second division of soccer in the United States from 1990 through 1996, now defunct.
- Canadian Championship (CC) – The premier knockout cup competition in Canadian soccer, first contested in 2008. The Voyageurs Cup (VC), founded in 2002, preceded the competition and now serves as the championship trophy for the current cup tournament.
- CONCACAF Champions League (CCL) – The premier competition in North American soccer since 1962. It went by the name of Champions' Cup until 2008.

Key to colours and symbols

1st or W	Winners
2nd or RU	Runners-up
3rd	Third place
Last	Last place
♦	League top scorer
	Highest average attendance
Italics	Ongoing competition

Key to league record

- Season = The year and article of the season
- Div = Division/level on pyramid
- League = League name
- Pld = Games played
- W = Games won
- L = Games lost
- D = Games drawn
- GF = Goals for
- GA = Goals against
- GD = Goal difference
- Pts = Points
- PPG = Points per game
- Conf. = Conference position
- Overall = League position

Key to cup record

- DNE = Did not enter
- DNQ = Did not qualify
- NH = Competition not held or cancelled
- QR = Qualifying round
- PR = Preliminary round
- GS = Group stage
- R1 = First round
- R2 = Second round
- R3 = Third round
- R4 = Fourth round
- R5 = Fifth round
- Ro16 = Round of 16
- QF = Quarter-finals
- SF = Semi-finals
- F = Final
- RU = Runners-up
- W = Winners

== Seasons ==
Season	League											Position		Playoffs	CC	Continental / Other		Average attendance (Note: Average attendance only includes statistics from regular season matches.)	Top goalscorer(s) (Note: Top goalscorer(s) includes all goals scored in the regular season, MLS Cup Playoffs, Canadian Championship, MLS is Back Tournament, CONCACAF Champions League, FIFA Club World Cup, and other competitive continental matches.)	
Season	Div	League	Pld	W	L	D	GF	GA	GD	Pts	PPG (Note: Points and PPG have been adjusted from non-traditional to traditional scoring systems for seasons prior to 2003 to more effectively compare historical team performance across seasons.)	Conf.	Overall	Playoffs	CC	Continental / Other		Average attendance	Name(s)	Goals
1993	2	APSL	24	11	13	0	28	33	−5	33	1.38	N/A	7th	DNQ	–	DNE		–	(Canada) Grant Needham	6
1994	2	APSL	20	12	8	0	27	18	+9	36	1.80	N/A	3rd	W	–	DNE		3,216	(United States) Jean Harbor	10
1995	2	A-League	24	17	7	0	47	27	+20	51	2.13	N/A	1st	SF	–	DNE		5,075	(Jamaica) Lloyd Barker	12
1996	2	A-League	27	21	6	0	40	18	+22	55	2.04	N/A	1st	SF	–	DNE		4,868	(Canada) Eddy Berdusco	9
1997	2	A-League	28	21	7	0	58	19	+39	61	2.18	1st	1st	QF	–	DNE		5,066	(England) Darren Tilley	16
1998	2	A-League	28	21	7	0	47	33	+14	47	1.68	4th	9th	QF	–	DNE		4,008	(Canada) Mauro Biello	11
1999	On hiatus																			
2000	2	A-League	28	12	13	3	34	41	−7	39	1.39	10th	17th	DNQ	–	DNE		2,338	(Canada) Ali Gerba	7
2001	2	A-League	26	10	14	2	29	37	−8	32	1.23	4th	14th	DNQ	–	DNE		2,103	(Greece) George Papandreou	9
2002	2	A-League	28	16	9	3	39	29	+10	51	1.82	3rd	5th	QF	–	DNE		5,178	(Cuba) Eduardo Sebrango	19♦
2003	2	A-League	28	16	6	6	40	21	+19	54	1.93	1st	2nd	QF	–	DNE		7,236	(Canada) Mauro Biello	7
2004	2	A-League	28	17	6	5	36	15	+21	56	2.00	1st	2nd	W	–	DNE		9,279	(Ghana) Frederick Commodore (Cuba) Eduardo Sebrango	8
2005	2	USL-1	28	18	3	7	37	15	+22	61	2.18	N/A	1st	SF	–	DNE		11,176	(Canada) Mauro Biello	9
2006	2	USL-1	28	14	5	9	31	15	+16	51	1.82	N/A	1st	SF	–	DNE		11,554	(Brazil) Mauricio Salles	9
2007	2	USL-1	28	14	6	8	32	21	+11	50	1.79	N/A	3rd	QF	–	DNE		11,035	(Canada) Charles Gbeke	10
2008	2	USL-1	30	12	12	6	33	28	+5	42	1.40	N/A	3rd	SF	W	CONCACAF Champions League	QF	12,696	(Panama) Roberto Brown (United States) Tony Donatelli	4
2009	2	USL-1	30	12	11	7	32	31	+1	43	1.43	N/A	5th	W	3rd	DNQ		12,033	(Panama) Roberto Brown	7
2010	2	D2 Pro	30	12	11	7	36	30	+6	43	1.43	3rd	6th	SF	3rd	DNQ		12,397	(Canada) Ali Gerba	13
2011	2	NASL	28	9	11	8	35	27	+8	35	1.25	N/A	7th	DNQ	SF	DNQ		11,514	(United States) Ryan Pore	7
2012	1	MLS	34	12	16	6	45	51	−6	42	1.24	7th	12th	DNQ	SF	DNQ		22,772	(Canada) Patrice Bernier	9
2013	1	MLS	34	14	13	7	50	49	+1	49	1.44	5th	11th	R1	W	CONCACAF Champions League	GS	20,602	(Italy) Marco Di Vaio	22
2014	1	MLS	34	6	18	10	38	58	−20	28	0.82	10th	19th	DNQ	W	CONCACAF Champions League	RU	17,421	(Italy) Marco Di Vaio	13
2015	1	MLS	34	15	13	6	48	44	+4	51	1.50	3rd	7th	QF	RU	DNQ		17,750	(Ivory Coast) Didier Drogba (Argentina) Ignacio Piatti	12
2016	1	MLS	34	11	11	12	49	53	−4	45	1.32	5th	11th	SF	SF	DNQ		20,669	(Argentina) Ignacio Piatti	21
2017	1	MLS	34	11	17	6	52	58	−6	39	1.15	9th	17th	DNQ	RU	N/A		20,046	(Argentina) Ignacio Piatti	19
2018	1	MLS	34	14	16	4	47	53	−6	46	1.35	7th	15th	DNQ	SF	DNQ		18,569	(Argentina) Ignacio Piatti	16
2019	1	MLS	34	12	17	5	47	60	−13	41	1.21	9th	18th	DNQ	W	DNQ		16,171	(Algeria) Saphir Taïder	10
2020	1	MLS	23	8	13	2	33	43	−10	26	1.13	9th	18th	PR	DNQ	CONCACAF Champions League MLS is Back Tournament	QF Ro16	5,439	(Honduras) Romell Quioto	10
2021	1	MLS	34	12	12	10	46	44	+2	46	1.35	10th	18th	DNQ	W	DNQ			(Honduras) Romell Quioto	9
2022	1	MLS	34	20	9	5	63	50	+13	65	1.91	2nd	3rd	QF	SF	CONCACAF Champions League	QF	14,828	(Honduras) Romell Quioto	15
2023	1	MLS	34	12	17	5	36	52	–16	41	1.21	10th	20th	DNQ	RU	Leagues Cup	GS	17,552	(Canada) Mathieu Choiniere	5
2024	1	MLS	34	11	13	10	48	64	–16	43	1.26	8th	17th	WC	QF	Leagues Cup	Ro32	19,619	(Venezuela) Josef Martínez	11
2025	1	MLS	34	6	18	10	34	60	−26	28	0.82	13th	28th	DNQ	QF	Leagues Cup	GS	16,162	(Ghana) Prince Owusu	17
2026	1	MLS	34	6	20	8	37	69	−32	26	0.76	15th	30th	DNQ	RU	DNQ		14,675	(Ghana) Prince Owusu	18
Total			820	380	301	139	1116	971	+145	1253	1.54	–	–	–	–	–		–	(Argentina) Ignacio Piatti	78
