= 2005 Voyageurs Cup =

2005 Coupe des Voyageurs (in French)

Tournament details
- Country: Canada
- Teams: 3

Final positions
- Champions: Montreal Impact (4th title)
- Runners-up: Vancouver Whitecaps

Tournament statistics
- Matches played: 6
- Goals scored: 7 (1.17 per match)
- Top goal scorer(s): Mauro Biello (3 goals)

The 2005 Voyageurs Cup was the fourth Voyageurs Cup tournament which was started by the Canadian supporters group The Voyageurs. The 2005 Edition of the tournament featured Montreal Impact, Toronto Lynx and Vancouver Whitecaps. Professional soccer teams in Edmonton and Calgary ceased being operated by the league and folded at the end of the 2004 season respectively.

The 2005 Voyageurs Cup was won by Montreal Impact who captured the competition in a dominant fashion going undefeated and clinching the competition on August 31, 2005 in their third of four matches. Montreal Impact not only dominated their Canadian rivals but also the league winning ten points clear of the nearest opposition although the 2005 USL First Division was not a balanced home and away competition where each team played the others an equal number of times.

== Format ==
Each team played two matches (home and away) against each other team. All of these matches are drawn from the USL First Division 2005 regular season; the final two matches played between each city's team is counted as a Voyageurs Cup 2005 match. In each match, 3 points are awarded for wins (even if it comes in extra time), 1 point is awarded for a draw, and 0 points are awarded for losses (even if it comes in extra time). The four teams are ranked according to the total number of points obtained in all matches.

The team ranked highest after all matches have been played is the champion, and will be awarded the Voyageurs Cup.

== Standings ==
Pos	Team	Pld	W	D	L	GF	GA	GD	Pts	MTL	VAN	TOR
1	Montreal Impact	4	4	0	0	5	1	+4	12	—	1–0	2–1
2	Vancouver Whitecaps FC	4	1	1	2	1	2	−1	4	0–1	—	0–0
3	Toronto Lynx	4	0	1	3	1	4	−3	1	0–1	0–1	—

=== Results by round ===
Montreal Impact
Round	1	2	3	4
Ground	A	H	H	A
Result	W	W	W	W

Source: Voyageurs.ca
A = Away; H = Home; W = Win; D = Draw; L = Loss

Toronto Lynx
Round	1	2	3	4
Ground	A	H	A	H
Result	D	L	L	L

Source: Voyageurs.ca
A = Away; H = Home; W = Win; D = Draw; L = Loss

Vancouver Whitecaps
Round	1	2	3	4
Ground	H	A	A	H
Result	D	L	W	L

Source: Voyageurs.ca
A = Away; H = Home; W = Win; D = Draw; L = Loss

== Schedule ==
2005-04-24
22:00 EDT

Vancouver Whitecaps	0 – 0	Toronto Lynx
	Report

Swangard Stadium
Vancouver, British Columbia, Canada
Attendance: 5,722
Referee: Paul Ward

2005-07-22
19:30 EDT

Toronto Lynx	0 – 1	Montreal Impact
	Report	Mauro Biello 38'

Centennial Park Stadium
Toronto, Ontario, Canada
Attendance: 2,489
Referee: Kevin Doliba

2005-07-24
16:00 EDT

Montreal Impact	2 – 1	Toronto Lynx
Zé Roberto 52'; Biello 72'	Report	Joe Mattacchione 30'

Complexe sportif Claude-Robillard
Montreal, Quebec, Canada
Attendance: 12,885
Referee: Tiger Liu

2005-08-31
19:30 EDT

Montreal Impact	1 – 0	Vancouver Whitecaps
António Ribeiro 5'	Report

Complexe sportif Claude-Robillard
Montreal, Quebec, Canada
Attendance: 8,917
Referee: Steve Depiero

2005-09-02
20:00 EDT

Toronto Lynx	0 – 1	Vancouver Whitecaps
	Report	Joey Gjertsen 59'

Centennial Park Stadium
Toronto, Ontario, Canada
Attendance: 1,587
Referee: Domenic Scali

2005-09-11
19:00 EDT

Vancouver Whitecaps	0 – 1	Montreal Impact
	Report	Sebrango 10'

Swangard Stadium
Vancouver, British Columbia, Canada
Attendance: 6,192
Referee: Silviu Petrescu

=== Champion ===
Voyageurs Cup:
Montreal Impact
4th Voyageurs Cup Win

== Top scorers ==
Rank	Player	Club	Goals
1	(Canada) Mauro Biello	Montreal Impact	3
2	(Cuba) Eduardo Sebrango	Montreal Impact	1
2	(Brazil) Zé Roberto	Montreal Impact	1
2	(United States) Joey Gjertsen	Vancouver Whitecaps	1
2	(Canada) António Ribeiro	Montreal Impact	1
2	(Canada) Joe Mattacchione	Toronto Lynx	1
