= Défi sportif =

Canadian sport event for disabled athletes

The Défi sportif (French pronunciation: [defi spɔʁtif], sports challenge) is a multi-sport event for disabled athletes held annually in Montreal, Quebec, Canada. It is the largest parasports event in Canada. The Défi sportif involves athletes across five types of disabilities: auditory, physical, psychiatric, intellectual, and visual, as well as athletes of multiple levels – from students to Paralympic athletes.

The main event site is Montreal's Complexe sportif Claude-Robillard, but other sites in Montreal are used, such as Centre Pierre-Charbonneau, Collège de Maisonneuve, Mount Royal, Circuit Gilles Villeneuve, etc.

== History ==
The first Défi sportif opened on April 19, 1984, under the auspices of the organization known as the Regional Association for the Recreation of Disabled Persons of the Island of Montreal. The inaugural Défi sportif welcomed no less than 720 athletes competing in 16 sports at three sites. In fact, it is the first time that associations representing all five types of disability gather to participate at one sporting event.

One of the events goals was to be self-financing. To that end the business community was approached and by the event's second year, numerous patrons, partners and sponsors lent their support and popular Quebec humorist Yvon Deschamps signed on as spokesman, a role he would play for the next fifteen years.

In 1986, the Défi sportif was named "Sporting Event of the Year" by the Montréal-Concordia Sports Commission.

The Défi sportif was originally a provincial event, but by 1989, more and more sports clubs from outside Quebec sent participants, and in the early 1990s, the Défi sportif went officially international with athletes Canada, the United States and France.

In 1998, the Défi sportif hosted athletes from eight countries, including Germany, France, Australia and Poland and was named the Quebec international sports event of the year.

In 2005, the Défi sportif welcomed some 2700 athletes over five days of competition. Its official spokespeople included wheelchair athlete Chantal Petitclerc.

In 2006, the Défi sportif welcomed some 2800 athletes over its run from April 26 to 30. Its official spokespeople once again included Petitclerc.

== Games ==
No.	Year	Host city	Events
1	1984	Montreal, Quebec, Canada	
2	1985	Montreal, Quebec, Canada	
3	1986	Montreal, Quebec, Canada	
4	1987	Montreal, Quebec, Canada	
5	1988	Montreal, Quebec, Canada	
6	1989	Montreal, Quebec, Canada	
7	1990	Montreal, Quebec, Canada	
8	1991	Montreal, Quebec, Canada	
9	1992	Montreal, Quebec, Canada	
10	1993	Montreal, Quebec, Canada	
11	1994	Montreal, Quebec, Canada	
12	1995	Montreal, Quebec, Canada	
13	1996	Montreal, Quebec, Canada	
14	1997	Montreal, Quebec, Canada	
15	1998	Montreal, Quebec, Canada	
16	1999	Montreal, Quebec, Canada	
17	2000	Montreal, Quebec, Canada	
18	2001	Montreal, Quebec, Canada	
19	2002	Montreal, Quebec, Canada	
20	2003	Montreal, Quebec, Canada	
21	2004	Montreal, Quebec, Canada	
22	2005	Montreal, Quebec, Canada	
23	2006	Montreal, Quebec, Canada	
24	2007	Montreal, Quebec, Canada	
25	2008	Montreal, Quebec, Canada	
26	2009	Montreal, Quebec, Canada	
27	2010	Montreal, Quebec, Canada	
28	2011	Montreal, Quebec, Canada	
29	2012	Montreal, Quebec, Canada	
30	2013	Montreal, Quebec, Canada	
31	2014	Montreal, Quebec, Canada	
32	2015	Montreal, Quebec, Canada	
33	2016	Montreal, Quebec, Canada	
34	2017	Montreal, Quebec, Canada	
35	2018	Montreal, Quebec, Canada	
36	2019	Montreal, Quebec, Canada	
37	2020	Montreal, Quebec, Canada (Virtual)	

== Sports involved ==
Competitions in the following sports are held at the Défi sportif:

1. Badminton
2. Ball hockey
3. Boccia
4. Cycling
5. Goalball
6. Rhythmic gymnastics
7. Soccer
8. Swimming
9. Track and field
10. Volleyball
11. Water polo
12. Wheelchair basketball
13. Wheelchair fencing
14. Wheelchair racing
15. Wheelchair rugby
