= Mesut Mert =

Canadian soccer player

Personal information
- Full name: Mesut Mert
- Date of birth: 18 March 1978 (age 48)
- Place of birth: Sofia, Bulgaria
- Height: 1.65 m (5 ft 5 in)
- Position: Midfielder

Team information
- Current team: Saint Mary's men (Head coach)

College career
| Years | Team | Apps | (Gls) |
- Saint Mary's

Senior career*
| Years | Team | Apps | (Gls) |
| 2004 | Calgary Mustangs | 25 | (5) |
| 2005–2006 | Montreal Impact | 40 | (0) |
| 2007–2010 | Scotia SC | 20 | (6) |
| 2010–2011 | Suburban FC | | |
| Total | | 85 | (11) |

International career
| 2003 | Canada University | 6 | (0) |

Managerial career
- 2007–2010: Scotia SC (Technical director)
- 2008–2009: Scotia SC (U12 Girls)
- 2010: Suburban FC (U16 Girls)
- 2010: Scotia SC (U8-12 Boys)
- 2010–2014: Saint Mary's men (Assistant)
- 2010–2016: Suburban FC
- 2015–: Saint Mary's men
- 2017–2019: United DFC
- 2020–2023: HFX Wanderers (Assistant)
- 2024–: Inter Halifax (Technical director)
- * Club domestic league appearances and goals

Mesut Mert (born 18 March 1978) is a football coach and former player who serves as head coach of the Saint Mary's University men's soccer team. Born in Bulgaria, he represented Canada internationally. He was an assistant coach for HFX Wanderers from 2020 until 2023.

== Playing career ==
Mert made his USL debut with the Calgary Mustangs but joined Montreal for the 2005 season after Calgary folded.

== International career ==
Mert represented Canada at the 2003 Summer Universiade.

== Coaching career ==
Mert was named Technical Director of Scotia SC on 22 September 2007. He's also a former coach and player of Suburban FC's Senior A Premier Men's Division, in the Nova Scotia Soccer League.

On 3 March 2020, Mert joined Canadian Premier League side HFX Wanderers as an assistant coach under Stephen Hart.

In January 2024, Mert was named Technical Director of Inter Halifax Soccer Club, a high-performance collaboration between Halifax Dunbrack Soccer Club and Halifax City Soccer Club.

== Personal life ==
Mert was born in Bulgaria and is of Turkish ancestry. He was brought up in Halifax.
