= Vinicius Brito =

Brazilian footballer

Personal information
- Full name: Vinicius Rabello Miguel Brito
- Date of birth: September 26, 1982 (age 44)
- Place of birth: São Paulo, Brazil
- Position: Striker

Team information
- Current team: Imbituba Futebol Clube

Senior career*
Years	Team	Apps	(Gls)
2003	Clube Atlético Joseense		
2004–2006	Toronto Lynx	8	(1)
2007–	Imbituba Futebol Clube		
- * Club domestic league appearances and goals as of 30 January 2010

Vinicius Rabello Miguel Brito (born 26 September 1982 in São Paulo) is a Brazilian footballer who currently plays for Imbituba Futebol Clube.

== Playing career ==
Brito began playing football with Clube Atlético Joseense in Brazil, where he won Copa Paulista de Futebol in 2003. The following season he went abroad to Canada to sign with the Toronto Lynx on July 21, 2004. He made his Lynx debut on July 25 in a 3-2 victory over the Calgary Mustangs. Under Duncan Wilde Brito was confined to the bench for most of the season only appearing in matches for 45 minutes even when as a starter. Brito was still able to record his first goal for the Lynx on August 16 in 3-1 victory over Edmonton Aviators. Despite his efforts the Lynx failed to clinch a playoff spot. In total he appeared in 8 matches and recorded one goal in his rookie season with Toronto.
