= Walter Otta =

Argentine footballer and manager

Personal information
- Full name: Walter Nicolás Otta
- Date of birth: 12 December 1973 (age 52)
- Place of birth: Río Tercero, Argentina
- Height: 1.86 m (6 ft 1 in)
- Position: Striker

Team information
- Current team: Deportivo Morón (Manager)

Senior career*
Years	Team	Apps	(Gls)
1993–1996	Villa Dálmine	63	(15)
1996–1997	Puerto Montt	29	(15)
1998	Temuco	4	(1)
1998–1999	Walsall	40	(12)
1999	Xerez	14	(3)
2000	Marathón	0	(0)
2001	Blooming	31	(15)
2001	Nacional	4	(1)
2002	União Madeira	20	(11)
2003	Universidad (SMP)	12	(1)
2003	Manta	7	(1)
2004	Calgary Mustangs	9	(3)
2004–2005	Fortuna Düsseldorf	9	(0)
2005–2007	Villa Dálmine		
2007	Sportivo Barracas	16	(5)
2008–2009	Fénix	15	(0)

Managerial career
- 2010–2013: Villa Dálmine
- 2014–2015: Acassuso
- 2015: Unión Mar del Plata
- 2016–2018: Deportivo Morón
- 2018–2019: Villa Dálmine
- 2019–2021: Atlético de Rafaela
- 2022: Estudiantes BA
- 2023: Patronato
- 2023–2024: Estudiantes BA
- 2024–: Deportivo Morón
- * Club domestic league appearances and goals

Walter Nicolás Otta (born 12 December 1973) is an Argentine retired football striker and currently the manager of Deportivo Morón.

== Career ==
Otta is a classic example of the international journeyman footballer, and has played for 14 different teams in 11 different countries.

Otta was born in Río Tercero, Córdoba, and started his career with Villa Dálmine in the lower leagues of Argentine football in 1993. In 1996, he moved to Chile to play for Puerto Montt and then Deportivo Temuco. Between 1998 and 1999 he played for Walsall at the third level of English football. In 1999, he joined Xerez CD in Spain. 2000 saw him play at Marathón in Honduras and in 2001 he played for Blooming of Bolivia. Between 2001 and 2003 he played in Portugal with C.D. Nacional and then C.F. União. He played in Peru with Universidad San Martín and then for Manta Fútbol Club in Ecuador. In 2004, he joined Calgary Mustangs in Canada before signing for Fortuna Düsseldorf in Germany. In 2005, he returned to Argentina and Villa Dálmine before moving to Sportivo Barracas in 2007. Otta joined in January 2008 to Fénix and retired in the winter of 2009.

== Coaching career ==
Otta started his coaching career in September 2010, becoming manager of his former club Villa Dálmine. He was in charge until the end of 2013, also achieving promotion to Primera B Metropolitana, before he left the club to become manager of Club Atlético Acassuso. He left the club in August 2015 and one month later became manager of Unión de Mar del Plata. He managed the team until the end of the year and then became manager of Deportivo Morón. Under Otta, the club had one of its best periods in the club history, but meanwhile, Otta decided to resign after a defeat on 19 October 2018. One week later, his return to Villa Dálmine was announced. He resigned on 8 May 2019.

On 22 May 2019, he became manager of Atlético de Rafaela.
