= Sean Fraser (soccer) =

Canadian soccer player

Personal information
- Full name: Sean Fraser
- Date of birth: September 21, 1980 (age 46)
- Place of birth: Edmonton, Alberta, Canada
- Height: 5 ft 11 in (1.80 m)
- Position: Attacking midfielder

Youth career
- 1995–1998: Holy Trinity High School
- 1991–1998: Millwoods Warriors

College career
Years	Team	Apps	(Gls)
1998–2002	Memphis Tigers		

Senior career*
Years	Team	Apps	(Gls)
2003	Calgary Storm	28	(3)
2004	Edmonton Aviators	24	(5)
2005	Toronto Lynx	27	(4)
2006	Nanchang Bayi	19	(1)

International career
1998	Canada U20	4	(0)
2001	Canada U23	3	(1)
- * Club domestic league appearances and goals

Sean Fraser (born September 21, 1980) is a former professional soccer player who played the majority of his career in the United Soccer Leagues.

== Career ==
Before beginning his pro career Fraser was a standout striker for the University of Memphis where he led Conference USA in goals (18) and points (42) in earning All-Conference honours in 2001. Fraser is still the all times points leader for the University of Memphis mens soccer program. He began his professional career in the USL A-League with Calgary Storm in 2003. His signing was announced on April 21, 2003, in a press report.

The following season he signed with his hometown club the Edmonton Aviators, an expansion franchise for the 2004 season. He made his debut for the club on May 1, 2004, in a 0–0 draw against the Vancouver Whitecaps (1986–2010). With Edmonton, Fraser recorded four goals and two assists.

On May 10, 2005, it was announced that Fraser signed a contract with the Toronto Lynx. He made his debut for the club on April 23, 2005, in a match against the Portland Timbers (2001–10), which resulted in a 3–0 defeat. He recorded his first goal for the club on May 31, 2005, in a match against the Rochester Rhinos in a 5–3 defeat. He concluded the season with Toronto with 4 goals and 3 assists.

In 2006, Fraser signed for Nanchang Bayi in the Jia League to a two-year contract. In December, 2008 he signed a contract with the Edmonton Drillers in the Canadian Major Indoor Soccer League.

== International career ==
Fraser represented Canada at the 1998 CONCACAF U-19 Qualification Tournament and helped Canada reach the quarter-final stage of the IV Jeux de la Francophonie Canada 2001 in Ottawa/Hull. He scored his first goal for Canada against France in the quarter-final game.

== Honours ==
Fraser was recently inducted into the University of Memphis Hall of Fame in September 2009.
