= Waldemar Dutra =

Canadian soccer player

Personal information
- Date of birth: 20 February 1983 (age 43)
- Place of birth: Sherwood Park, Canada
- Position: Midfielder

Senior career*
Years	Team	Apps	(Gls)
2002	Calgary Storm	11	(1)
2003/2004	NK Osijek	1	(0)
2004/2005	1. FC Schweinfurt 05	5	(0)
- * Club domestic league appearances and goals

Waldemar Dutra (born 20 February 1983 in Canada) is a Canadian retired soccer player.

== Career ==
For 2003/04, Dutra signed for NK Osijek in Croatia. However, the club's head coach and president fought over his playing time and his only appearance came when the coach went behind the president's back to put him in the lineup.

In 2004, Dutra signed for Schweinfurt 05 in the German fourth division because he thought carving out a professional career in Canada and the United States was difficult.
