= Mauricio Vincello =

Argentine footballer

Personal information
- Full name: Mauricio Vincello
- Date of birth: August 19, 1977 (age 49)
- Place of birth: Salto, Buenos Aires, Argentina
- Height: 6 ft 0 in (1.83 m)
- Position: Defender

Youth career
- Defensores de Salto
- San Lorenzo

Senior career*
Years	Team	Apps	(Gls)
2000–2003	Toronto Lynx	96	(2)
2000–2001	Toronto ThunderHawks (indoor)	33	(3)
2004–2008	Montreal Impact	102	(7)
- * Club domestic league appearances and goals as of August 14, 2007

Mauricio Vincello (born August 19, 1977, in Salto, Buenos Aires, Argentina) is an Argentine former football defender.

== Playing career ==
Vincello began his career in his native country in Argentina with the youth teams of Defensores de Salto, and San Lorenzo de Almagro.

In 2000, he was signed by the Toronto Lynx after impressing at the Copa Latina tournament in Miami. With the Lynx he played in a minimum of 20 games per season from 2000 to 2003, and he averaged a total of 2,092.5 minutes spent on the field per season. He scored his first goal for the Lynx on August 29, 2003, against the Calgary Storm.

On February 25, 2004, he was acquired by the Montreal Impact in exchange for Andres Arango. During the 2004 season he was the Impact's best offensive defender with two goals and four assists over the regular season. He scored his first goal with the Impact May 28, 2004, in a 4–1 win over his former team the Toronto Lynx. As well helped the team collect a total of 19 shutouts, a league record at the time. During the playoffs, he started in all five games and he scored the game-winning goal in the championship game where the Impact won 2–0 against the Seattle Sounders to claim the championship. The following season he was one of four players to spend more than 2,000 minutes of play on the field over the regular season. For the second time in a row he was the Impact's leading scorer among the team's defenders with two goals and three assists. In 2005, he helped the Impact to a 15-game undefeated streak, which marked a new league record. As well win the regular-season title and the Voyageurs Cup.

During the 2006 season he helped the Impact post the best defense in the league for a fourth straight year, allowing only 15 goals in 28 games, a team record first set in 2004 and tied for the first time last year. Also helped the Impact collect 16 shutouts in 28 games, the second best total in club history tied with last year's, and three behind the league record of 19 set in 2004. He was also named into the USL All-Star Team that played English club Sheffield Wednesday to a 0–0 draw. And for the second straight year he helped win the regular-season title and help win his third Voyageurs Cup. At the conclusion of the season he was awarded the Giuseppe-Saputo Trophy as the Impact team MVP.

In 2007, he scored two goals and added one assist in the first quarter-final game against the Puerto Rico Islanders winning the game 3–2, but in the second quarter-final Montreal were eliminated losing 3–0 to the Islanders on a 5-3 aggregate goals. His highlights during the season were on August 26, 2007, where he played his 100th game for the Montreal club, becoming the 12th player in Impact history to reach this mark. And he was selected four times to the USL D1 Team of the Week. On September 25 at the team's annual awards banquet he was awarded Montreal' Defensive Player of the Year award. Impact head coach quoted saying:

"Mauricio showed once again this year that he is the best left back in the league. He was essential to the team’s success this season both defensively and offensively." On February 19, 2008, he announced his retirement from football.

Vincello had a stint in the National Professional Soccer League with the short lived expansion franchise the Toronto ThunderHawks during the 2000-2001 winter indoor season. He helped the ThunderHawks reach the postseason by finishing second in the National Conference, and reached the Conference finals where they were defeated by the Milwaukee Wave.

== Honors ==
=== Montreal Impact ===
- USL First Division Championship (1): 2004
- USL First Division Commissioners Cup (2): 2005, 2006
- Voyageurs Cup Champions (4): 2004, 2005, 2006, 2007
