= Sebastián Barclay =

Argentine footballer (born 1978)

Personal information
- Full name: Jorge Sebastián Barclay
- Date of birth: 2 January 1978 (age 48)
- Place of birth: La Plata, Buenos Aires, Argentina
- Height: 1.81 m (5 ft 11 in)
- Position: Forward

Youth career
- Gimnasia La Plata

Senior career*
Years	Team	Apps	(Gls)
1998–2001	Gimnasia La Plata	8	(0)
2000–2001	→ Tigre (loan)	19	(3)
2001	Villa Mitre	6	(0)
2002	Deportes Temuco	9	(0)
2003–2004	Toronto Lynx	27	(5)
2005	Deportivo Italchacao		
2006	Deportivo Marquense		
2006–2007	Toronto Lynx	5	(3)
2007–2008	Villa San Carlos	34	(6)
2008	Deportivo Laferrere	9	(1)
2009	Villa San Carlos	0	(0)

Managerial career
- 2015–2016: Cambaceres (assistant)
- * Club domestic league appearances and goals

Jorge Sebastián Barclay (born 2 January 1978) is a former Argentine footballer who played for clubs of Argentina, Chile, Guatemala, Venezuela and Canada.

== Career ==
Born in La Plata (Buenos Aires), Barclay started playing football with the youth teams of local side Gimnasia y Esgrima de La Plata. The forward made his senior debut for Gimnasia in the 1998 Copa CONMEBOL, and made his Primera División Argentina debut entering as a second-half substitute against Club Atlético Lanús on 18 June 1999. He went on a six-month loan to Club Atlético Tigre in 2000, and left Gimnasia in 2001 after making only eight Primera División appearances for the club.

Barclay scored 19 goals for newly promoted Chilean Primera División side Deportes Temuco in 2002, before signing for A-League club Toronto Lynx in 2003. Barclay scored a goal in his debut for the Lynx, a 2–0 victory over the Pittsburgh Riverhounds on 3 May 2003.

After his first stint with Toronto, Barclay joined Venezuelan second-tier club Deportivo Italchacao and Guatemalan club Deportivo Marquense.

His last clubs were Villa San Carlos and Deportivo Laferrere.

=== Teams ===
- Gimnasia y Esgrima de La Plata 1999
- Tigre 2000–2001
- Villa Mitre de Bahía Blanca 2001
- Deportes Temuco 2002
- Toronto Lynx 2003–2004
- Deportivo Italchacao 2005
- Deportivo Marquense 2006
- Toronto Lynx 2006–2007
- Villa San Carlos 2007–2008
- Deportivo Laferrere 2008
- Villa San Carlos 2009

== Coaching career ==
Barclay served as assistant coach for Defensores de Cambaceres in 2015–16.
