= Mauro Biello =

Canadian soccer player and coach

- Biello in 2026

Personal information
- Date of birth: August 8, 1972 (age 54)
- Place of birth: Montreal, Quebec, Canada
- Height: 5 ft 9 in (1.75 m)
- Position: Forward

Team information
- Current team: Canada (assistant coach)

College career
Years	Team	Apps	(Gls)
- Vanier Cheetahs
- Concordia Stingers

Senior career*
Years	Team	Apps	(Gls)
1991–1992	Montreal Supra	16	(1)
1993–1998	Montreal Impact	108	(32)
1995–1997	Buffalo Blizzard (indoor)	57	(48)
1999	Rochester Raging Rhinos	28	(8)
1997–2000	Montreal Impact (indoor)	116	(133)
2000–2009	Montreal Impact	235	(40)
2000–2001	Toronto Thunderhawks (indoor)	39	(44)
Total		389	(81)

International career
1995–2000	Canada	4	(0)

Managerial career
- 2012–2015: Montreal Impact (assistant)
- 2015–2017: Montreal Impact
- 2018–2023: Canada (assistant)
- 2022–2023: Canada U-20
- 2023–2024: Canada (interim)
- 2024–: Canada (assistant)
- * Club domestic league appearances and goals

Mauro Biello (born August 8, 1972) is a Canadian professional soccer assistant coach and former player who was the interim head coach of the Canada men's national team. He played as a forward for several Canadian and American lower division clubs, namely Montreal Supra, Buffalo Blizzard, Rochester Raging Rhinos, and Toronto Thunderhawks. He also spent a total of 16 seasons with the second division Montreal Impact, for whom he is the all-time statistical leader in goals and appearances, with over 80 goals and over 300 games for the team. As a Canadian international, he was capped four times from 1995 until 2000.

As a manager, he served as the head coach of Montreal Impact from 2015 until 2017 and served as the interim head coach of the Canadian men's national team in 2023-2024.

== Early life ==
Born in Montreal, Quebec, Biello attended St. Monica's Elementary School, Vincent Massey Collegiate and Marymount Academy, and played college soccer at Vanier College and Concordia University. He is of Italian descent.

== Club career ==
=== Early career ===
Biello began his professional soccer career in 1991 when he was drafted by the Montreal Supra.

=== Montreal Impact ===
A year later, the team folded and Biello signed with the newly formed expansion team, the Montreal Impact of the American Professional Soccer League. Biello helped the Impact capture the League Championship for the first time in 1994, but Biello played a small part in capturing the Championship. In 1997, Biello helped the Impact win the regular-season title by scoring 8 goals and recording 10 assists. He was awarded the Giuseppe-Saputo Trophy as the Impact's Team MVP. In addition to playing for Montreal during the outdoor season, Biello also spent two seasons, 1995–1997, with the Buffalo Blizzard in the National Professional Soccer League. In 1997, the Impact entered the NPSL. Consequently, Biello played both indoor and outdoor seasons with Montreal.

During the 1998 outdoor season, Biello played a major part for the Impact, scoring 11 goals and amassing 35 points (a team record that stood until the 2002 season, when Eduardo Sebrango surpassed it with 18 goals and 36 points). At the end of the season he was awarded the Giuseppe-Saputo Trophy for the second straight year.

=== Rochester Raging Rhinos ===
In 1999, Biello left the Impact because the new ownership decided not to play the 1999 outdoor season in order to better prepare the 1999-2000 indoor season, which left him to sign with rivals the Rochester Raging Rhinos. With Rochester, Biello enjoyed much success; he was Rochester's leading scorer with eight goals and four assists. He also helped the Rhinos win the U.S. Open Cup for the very first time and helped reach the championship game, which Rochester lost to the Minnesota Thunder.

=== Return to Montreal Impact ===
In 2000, Biello returned to the Impact, but the Impact didn't qualify for the playoffs that season. As the Impact was no longer playing indoor soccer, Biello spent the winter of 2000–01 with the Toronto Thunderhawks in the NPSL. In 2001, Impact coach Valerio Gazzola chose Biello to be the captain of the Montreal Impact. That year, the Impact had a struggling season both on and off the field. The team missed the playoffs for the second straight year. Biello lead the team in scoring with eight goals and again was awarded the Giuseppe-Saputo Trophy.

In 2004, Biello led the Impact to win the club's second league championship, beating the Seattle Sounders. That same year, he helped the Impact win the Voyageurs Cup for the third straight year.

In 2005, he helped the Impact play a 15-game streak without a loss (10-0-5), setting a new league record. He was the Impact's leading scorer in 2005, following a production of nine goals and three assists for a total of 21 points. Biello also was a finalist for League MVP honors, losing to Jason Jordan, and for the fourth time in his career he was awarded the Giuseppe-Saputo Trophy. Mauro also helped the Impact capture the Voyageurs Cup for a fourth straight year. On December 7, 2005, Biello signed a two-year deal with the Impact.

On July 13, 2007, he played his 300th career game with the Impact against the Carolina RailHawks, making him the first Impact player to reach that milestone as well as the first player in USL history to play 300 games with the same team.

On January 5, 2009, the Montreal Impact announced that Biello and veteran midfielder Patrick Leduc had both accepted contract extensions for the 2009 season. During the 2009 USL season Biello contributed by helping the Impact clinch a playoff spot under new head coach Marc Dos Santos. He helped the Impact reach the finals where Montreal would face the Vancouver Whitecaps FC, this marking the first time in USL history where the final match would consist of two Canadian clubs. In the final Biello helped the Impact win the series 6–3 on aggregate. The victory gave the Impact their third USL Championship and also the victory marked Biello's third USL Championship. Once the season came to a conclusion Biello announced his retirement from competitive soccer on November 19, 2009.

== International career ==
Biello played in two of Canada's three games at the 1989 FIFA U-16 World Championship in Scotland.

=== Senior team ===
He made his senior debut for the Canada national team on May 28, 1995, in a match against Chile. He earned a total of four caps, scoring no goals. His final international was a January 2000 friendly match against Trinidad and Tobago.

== Coaching career ==
=== Montreal Impact ===
Biello joined the coaching staff of the Montreal Impact in 2009 and became the interim head coach on August 30, 2015, after Frank Klopas was fired, a day after a 2–1 loss to Toronto FC. Montreal won 4–3 in his first match as interim head coach. Biello guided the team to the Eastern Conference semi-finals where they were eliminated by Columbus Crew. Biello had the interim tag removed after guiding the Impact into the playoffs. The Montreal Impact finished fifth in the Eastern Conference and got to the Eastern Conference final where they eliminated by Toronto FC. In 2017, the Impact struggled, winning just 11 games, against 17 losses and 6 draws. Biello was fired the day after the season ended.

=== Canada ===
In February 2018, Canada Soccer hired Biello as assistant coach to the Canada men's national team under head coach John Herdman.

On August 28, 2023, John Herdman resigned from the men's national team in order to join Toronto FC as their head coach. and Biello was announced as the interim coach of the team on September 20, 2023.

== Career statistics ==
=== Club ===
As of October 17, 2009

Club	Season	League			Playoffs		Domestic cup (Note: U.S. Open Cup (American clubs), Canadian Championship (Canadian clubs))		Continental (Note: CONCACAF Champions League)		Total	
Club	Season	League	Apps	Goals	Apps	Goals	Apps	Goals	Apps	Goals	Apps	Goals
Montreal Impact	1993	American Professional Soccer League	5	0	—		—		—		5	0
Montreal Impact	1994	American Professional Soccer League	13	2	4	0	—		—		17	2
Montreal Impact	1995	A-League	17	5	3	0	—		—		20	5
Montreal Impact	1996	A-League	22	6	3	2	—		—		25	8
Montreal Impact	1997	A-League	25	8	5	2	—		—		30	10
Montreal Impact	1998	A-League	27	11	—		—		—		27	11
Montreal Impact	Totals		109	32	15	4	—		—		124	36
Rochester Rhinos	1999	A-League	28	8	7	3	5	2	—		40	13
Montreal Impact	2000	A-League	28	5	—		—		—		28	5
Montreal Impact	2001	A-League	25	8	—		—		—		25	8
Montreal Impact	2002	A-League	25	3	4	0	—		—		29	3
Montreal Impact	2003	A-League	28	7	2	0	—		—		30	7
Montreal Impact	2004	A-League	22	1	5	1	—		—		27	2
Montreal Impact	2005	USL First Division	28	9	2	0	—		—		30	9
Montreal Impact	2006	USL First Division	28	3	2	0	—		—		30	3
Montreal Impact	2007	USL First Division	15	1	2	0	—		—		17	1
Montreal Impact	2008	USL First Division	17	1	4	0	1	0	4	0	26	1
Montreal Impact	2009	USL First Division	19	2	4	0	—				23	2
Montreal Impact	Totals		235	40	25	1	1	0	4	0	265	41
Career totals			372	80	47	8	6	2	4	0	429	90

== Coaching statistics ==
As of March 23, 2024

Team	Nat	From	To	Record								
Team	Nat	From	To	M	W	L	T	GF	GA	GD	Win %	Ref.
Montreal Impact	(Canada)	August 30, 2015	October 23, 2017	94	37	35	22	147	146	+1	39.36	
Canada	(Canada)	September 20, 2023	May 13, 2024	4	2	2	0	7	8	−1	50.00	
Total				98	39	37	22	154	154	+0	39.80	

== Honours ==
Montreal Impact

- APSL Championship: 1994
- USL First Division Championship: 2004, 2009
- USL First Division Commissioners Cup: 1995, 1996, 1997, 2005, 2006
- Voyageurs Cup Champions: 2002, 2003, 2004, 2005, 2006, 2007, 2008

Rochester Raging Rhinos

- U.S. Open Cup: 1999

Individual

- Number 20 retired by Montreal Impact

== Personal life ==
Biello's sons are also soccer players — his eldest is Gabriele, who played in the academy of Montreal Impact and went on to become a member of the Dawson College Blues soccer team roster; his younger son Alessandro plays as a midfielder for FC Supra du Quebec, as well the Canada men's national under-20 soccer team.

Biello speaks fluent English, French and Italian.
