= Frederick Commodore =

Ghanaian footballer

Personal information
- Full name: Frederick Oloquaye Commodore
- Date of birth: 17 August 1975 (age 51)
- Place of birth: Ghana
- Height: 6 ft 1 in (1.85 m)
- Position: Midfielder

Youth career
- 1990–1993: Saints Stars Colts

Senior career*
Years	Team	Apps	(Gls)
1993–1996	Hearts of Oak		
1996–1997	VfR Mannheim	3	(0)
1997	Vanguard Huandao	5	(0)
1997–1999	VfR Mannheim	9	(0)
1999–2000	Alemannia Aachen	8	(0)
2002–2003	G.D. Chaves	5	(0)
2003	Rochester Rhinos	20	(4)
2004	Montreal Impact	21	(8)
- * Club domestic league appearances and goals

Frederick Commodore (born 17 August 1975) is a Ghanaian former association football defender who played professionally in the USL A-League and the German 2. Bundesliga.

In 2003, Commodore signed with the Rochester Rhinos of the USL A-League. In 2004, he played for the Montreal Impact. The Impact released him in April 2005 after he suffered a season-ending leg injury.
