= The Voyageurs =

Soccer supporters' group for the Canada national teams

- Established: 1996
- Type: Supporters' group
- Team: Canada
- Key people: Reza Khalili
- Colours
- Website: Official website

The Voyageurs is an unofficial Canadian soccer supporters group founded in 1996, notable for their support of Canada's national teams, awarding of the annual Voyageurs Cup for men's club soccer, and influence in the Canadian soccer media.

== History ==
The group's first appearance at a match came at Commonwealth Stadium in Edmonton, Alberta, on August 30, 1996, displaying two banners at Canada's match with Panama to kick off the 1998 FIFA World Cup qualifying campaign. Partly created to help foster a pro-Canadian sentiment at home games traditionally dominated by away supporters, the Voyageurs developed an online presence through the work of early members like Edmonton's Reza Khalili and gained its name through a suggestion by Vancouver, British Columbia soccer fan Martin Rose. The name "The Voyageurs" was chosen partly for being bilingual and for reflecting the difficult task ahead for supporters of Canadian soccer attempting to promote the game.

One of the group's first cohesive actions was to organize a petition to attempt to convince Owen Hargreaves to play internationally for Canada. Born in Calgary to a Welsh mother and an English father, and also eligible as a British citizen born outside the United Kingdom to play for Northern Ireland or Scotland, Hargreaves had yet to play in a competitive international match and thus be bound to any of the five countries, despite turning out in a series of friendlies for Wales in 1998. He eventually chose England and went on to star at the 2006 World Cup. Early members of the Voyageurs also devoted resources to an annual Christmas card mailing to Canadian players abroad from 1998 on, a task that involved a relatively small number of players in Europe compared to the present day.

The Voyageurs made their Toronto, Ontario debut at a May 27, 2000 international friendly against Trinidad and Tobago at Varsity Stadium at the University of Toronto campus on Bloor Street. They were also present at the World Cup qualifier against Mexico at the same location later that year. A British Columbia branch, the Fort Victoria Voyageurs, made an appearance at the FIFA U-20 World Cup qualifiers in Victoria in March 2001.

Throughout their history, the Voyageurs have supported the Canada national team with banners, drums and chants during international matches in Toronto; Hamilton; Kingston; Edmonton; Victoria; Tallinn, Estonia and a number of other venues all over the world. The group was noted for their support of host nation Canada at the 2007 FIFA U-20 World Cup during matches in Edmonton, and were recognized with an appearance on FIFA's television magazine FIFA Futbol Mundial.

In May 2007, members of the group organized a letter of protest to the Canadian Soccer Association over their hiring procedure for the men's national team manager position and helped to publicize the Canadian Soccer Supporters United campaign to have spectators decked out in black "Sack the CSA" t-shirts at the friendly between Canada and Costa Rica at BMO Field.

The Voyageurs have worked with supporter groups from Canadian clubs Toronto FC, CF Montreal and Vancouver Whitecaps FC to distribute tickets for Canada national team games.

== Voyageurs Cup ==
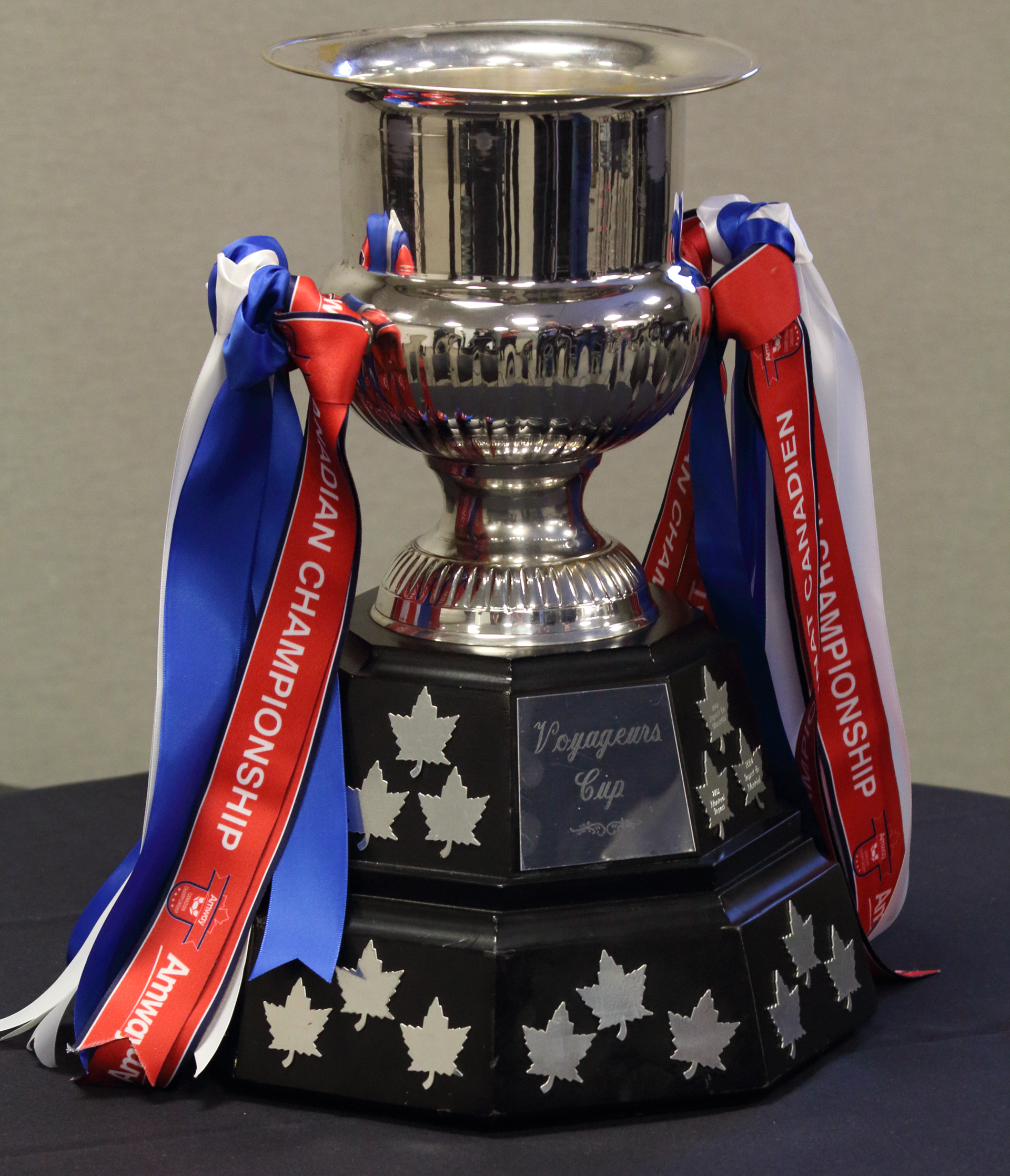
The Voyageurs Cup trophy

From 2002 through 2007, the Voyageurs Cup, organized and funded entirely through private donations by members of the group, was awarded annually to the Canadian USL-1 (formerly the A-League) side finishing the regular season with the best record in intra-Canadian league matches. The Montreal Impact won the first six titles, with teams from Edmonton, Calgary, Toronto and Vancouver all competing at some point in the competition's history.

In 2008, the trophy was handed over to the CSA to be handed to the winners of the Canadian Championship. The terms of the agreement were set to be reviewed in 2010.

== Player awards ==
The Voyageurs have awarded the following privately organized and financed awards to Canadian national team players:

=== Voyageurs International Player of the Year ===
Year	First	Second	Third
2006	Atiba Hutchinson	Kevin McKenna	Dwayne De Rosario
2007	Julian de Guzman	Dwayne De Rosario	Pat Onstad and Lars Hirschfeld (tie)
2008	Tomasz Radzinski	Julian de Guzman	Ali Gerba
2009	Mike Klukowski	Simeon Jackson	Will Johnson
2010	Atiba Hutchinson	Josh Simpson	Simeon Jackson
2011	Dwayne De Rosario	Josh Simpson	Simeon Jackson
2012	Atiba Hutchinson	Olivier Occean	Patrice Bernier
2013	Will Johnson	Atiba Hutchinson	Jonathan Osorio

=== Voyageurs Golden Shoe ===
Year	Goals	First	Team	League
2005	17	Jason Jordan	Vancouver Whitecaps	USL-1
2006	27	Gabriel Pop	Serbian White Eagles	CSL
2007	18	Nicolas Lesage and Gabriel Pop	Trois-Rivières Attak and Serbian White Eagles	CSL
2008	18, 12	Daniel Nascimento and Eduardo Sebrango	Brampton Lions and Vancouver Whitecaps	CSL, USL-1

== See also ==
- Canada men's national soccer team
- Soccer in Canada
