= Voyageurs Cup =

National soccer trophy for Canada

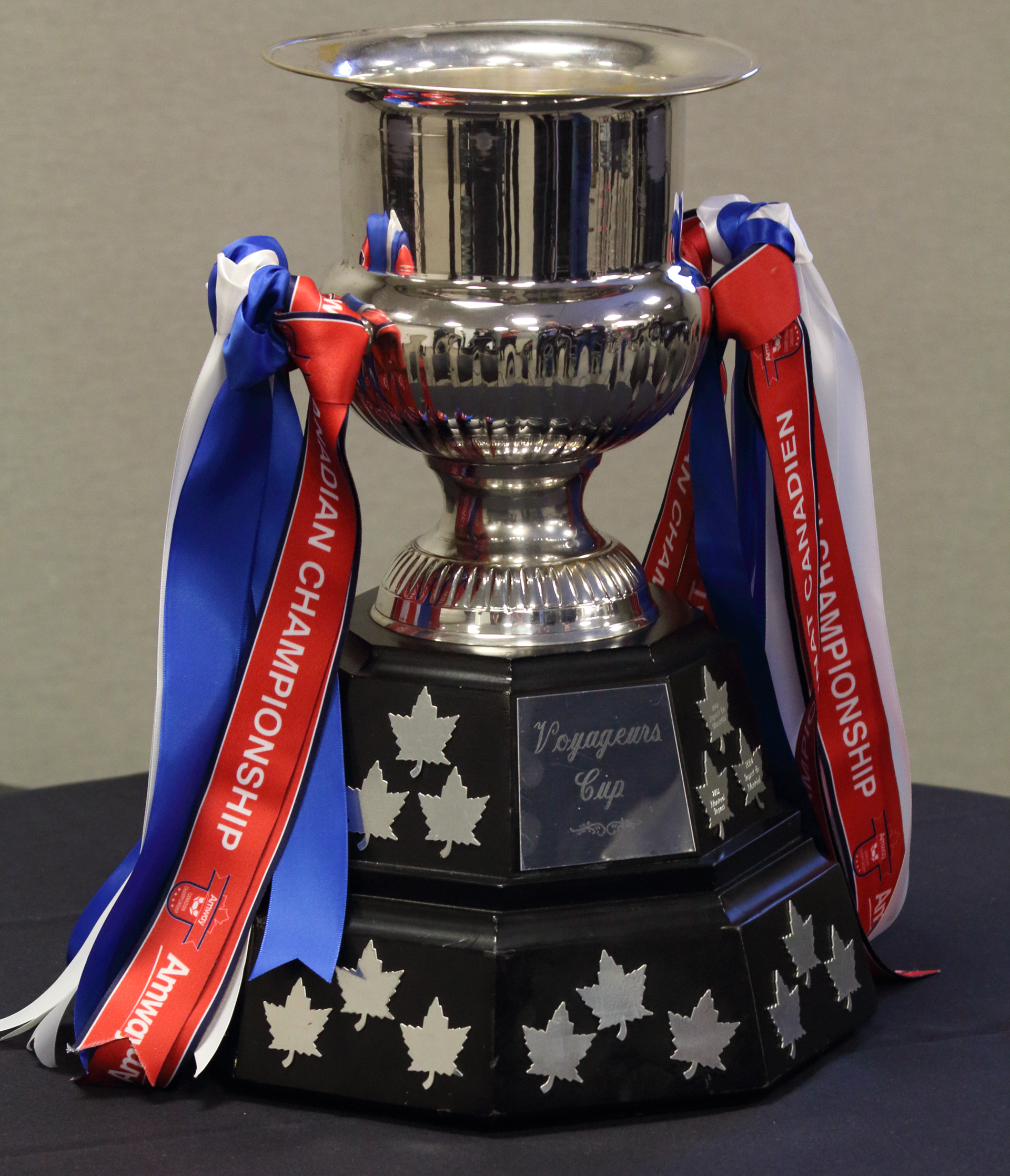
- The Voyageurs Cup trophy in 2013
- Competition: USL A-League/First Division (2002–2007); Canadian Championship (2008–present)
- Awarded for: Winning the professional national club championship of Canadian soccer
- Presented by: The Voyageurs (2002–2007); Canadian Soccer Association (2008–present)

History
- First award: 2002; 24 years ago
- Editions: 25
- First winner: Montreal Impact
- Most wins: CF Montréal (11 titles)
- Most recent: Forge FC (1st title)

The Voyageurs Cup (French: Coupe des Voyageurs) is the domestic trophy for professional soccer in Canada, awarded to the best men's club in the country.

The trophy was conceived and commissioned by fans of the Canada men's national team, the Voyageurs. From 2002 to 2007, the cup was awarded annually to the Canadian team finishing with the best record in the USL First Division, from regular-season matches against other Canadian teams in the league.

Since 2008, the trophy has been presented to the winner of the Canadian Championship, which also awards Canada's first berth in the CONCACAF Champions Cup. The current cup holders are Forge FC, after winning the 2026 Canadian Championship; Forge FC are the first team from the wholly domestic Canadian Premier League to achieve the feat.

== The trophy ==
The Voyageurs Cup trophy was created by the Voyageurs and first presented in 2002. Veteran Voyageurs member and chief fundraiser since the group's founding in 1996, Dwayne Cole, solicited donations on the Voyageurs internet forum, resulting in $3,500–4,000 donated. The money was used to commission the trophy, made in Winnipeg, Manitoba. The trophy is 40 centimetres tall.

The Voyageurs Cup itself is a handled wine cooler made from solid brass and electroplated in sterling silver. The base is lacquered, solid Canadian Oak and set with die cut polished aluminum maple leaf annual plates. An accompanying solid oak case was also crafted for safe transport. The cost of engraving, shipping, maintenance, and promotion of the trophy continued to be paid for by private donations from individual members of the Voyageurs until 2008.

The winning team keeps the Voyageurs Cup for the rest of the year before they return the trophy to Ottawa before January 1 of the new year. The winning team also receives 30 medals and prize money.

A member of the Voyageurs supporters group takes part in the trophy's presentation to the winning team each year.

== History ==
The Voyageurs Cup competition was first conceived in March 2002 by fans of the Canada men's national team, known as the Voyageurs. The group agreed to award the cup to whichever of the four Canadian clubs in the USL A-League – the Montreal Impact, Vancouver Whitecaps, Toronto Lynx and Calgary Storm – collected the most points against each other during the regular USL season.

Prior to the start of the 2007 USL season, the Toronto Lynx moved to the Premier Development League, and effectively withdrew from the Voyageurs Cup competition in the process. As a result, in 2007 the trophy was decided solely on regular-season results between the Montreal Impact and the Vancouver Whitecaps. This was the last year the cup was awarded based on regular season matches within a single league, as Toronto FC joined Major League Soccer the following year.

In 2008, the Canadian Championship was created to be the qualifying tournament for professional Canadian teams to access the CONCACAF Champions League. The first edition of this competition included the two remaining Canadian clubs from the USL First Division, and Toronto FC of Major League Soccer. The Voyageurs Cup trophy was handed over to the Canadian Soccer Association in 2008 to be presented to the Canadian Championship winners.

The Montreal Impact won the first seven titles, the first six by virtue of their regular-season record in the USL against other Canadian sides. They won the inaugural 2008 Canadian Championship to retain the trophy, their seventh straight Voyageurs Cup victory. Toronto FC won the 2009 Canadian Championship to win the Voyageurs Cup for the first time. After thirteen unsuccessful attempts, the Vancouver Whitecaps FC won their first Voyageurs Cup title in 2015. The Calgary Storm never finished higher than fourth in the competition while the Edmonton Aviators finished third in their lone appearance in the tournament. The Toronto Lynx finished as runners-up in four of the five years they participated. FC Edmonton played in five consecutive Canadian Championship semi-finals from 2011 to 2015, but were never able to reach the final. The closest they came was in 2014, when they had almost defeated the Montreal Impact on away goals, but conceded from a penalty kick in the 90+7th minute to lose 4–5 on aggregate.

The Canadian Championship greatly expanded in size in the late 2010s. In 2018, the champions of the provincial semi-pro leagues were granted entry into the tournament, which gave semi-pro teams a chance to win the Voyageurs Cup for the first time, reinforcing the national championship status of the competition. In 2019, the tournament more than doubled in size when all seven teams from the newly formed Canadian Premier League were added to the competition. In 2025 and 2026, 15 teams competed for the Voyageurs Cup, which made those the largest tournaments to date. The expansion of the footprint of the third-tier Premier League Canada system, which operates on a regional basis may increase the number of entrants further.

The three MLS teams continue to dominate the tournament post 2019, representing the champions and runner up in all years except for three. In 2020, Forge was the first CPL team to make it to the final, but they fell to Toronto FC in a penalty shoot-out. In 2025, despite a poor regular season performance, Vancouver FC reached the final, but lost to neighbouring Whitecaps 4–2. In 2026, Forge defeated Montreal in the final in a penalty shoot-out.

== Format ==
=== 2002–2007: USL era ===
Prior to 2008, the men's title was decided on regular-season matches between Canada's USL First Division sides.

=== 2008–2010: Canadian Championship, round robin format ===
The inaugural Canadian Championship was held in 2008, with the three Canadian teams spread across MLS (Toronto FC) and the USL First Division (Montreal Impact and Vancouver Whitecaps) each playing four non-league games in a round robin format.

=== 2011–present: Canadian Championship, knockout format ===
Beginning with the 2011 tournament, a knockout format has been used. In 2011, with four teams involved, the tournament was changed to be a home-and-away semi-final round and a similar final round between the winners. Toronto, as reigning champions, were assigned the top seed and were matched with Edmonton, which was assigned the fourth seed as newcomers to the tournament. The two remaining teams, Montreal and Vancouver, faced off in the other semi-final.

== Champions ==
=== Year-by-year ===
Year	Winner	Runner-up	Final score	Number of teams
Rivalry cup era: Trophy awarded by the Voyageurs
2002	**Montreal Impact**	Toronto Lynx	round-robin	4
2003	**Montreal Impact** (2)	Toronto Lynx	round-robin	4
2004	**Montreal Impact** (3)	Toronto Lynx	round-robin	5
2005	**Montreal Impact** (4)	Vancouver Whitecaps FC	round-robin	3
2006	**Montreal Impact** (5)	Toronto Lynx	round-robin	3
2007	**Montreal Impact** (6)	Vancouver Whitecaps FC	round-robin	2
Canadian Championship era: Trophy awarded by the Canadian Soccer Association
2008	**Montreal Impact** (7)	Toronto FC	round-robin	3
2009	**Toronto FC**	Vancouver Whitecaps FC	round-robin	3
2010	**Toronto FC** (2)	Vancouver Whitecaps FC	round-robin	3
2011	**Toronto FC** (3)	Vancouver Whitecaps FC	3–2 (agg.)	4
2012	**Toronto FC** (4)	Vancouver Whitecaps FC	2–1 (agg.)	4
2013	**Montreal Impact** (8)	Vancouver Whitecaps FC	2–2 (agg.) (a)	4
2014	**Montreal Impact** (9)	Toronto FC	2–1 (agg.)	5
2015	**Vancouver Whitecaps FC**	Montreal Impact	4–2 (agg.)	5
2016	**Toronto FC** (5)	Vancouver Whitecaps FC	2–2 (agg.) (a)	5
2017	**Toronto FC** (6)	Montreal Impact	3–2 (agg.)	5
2018	**Toronto FC** (7)	Vancouver Whitecaps FC	7–4 (agg.)	6
2019	**Montreal Impact** (10)	Toronto FC	1–1 (agg.) (3–1 p)	13
2020	**Toronto FC** (8)	Forge FC	1–1 (5–4 p)	2 (Note: Due to pandemic-related difficulties, the 2020 tournament consisted of a single match held on June 4, 2022. It was contested between one team from Major League Soccer and one from the Canadian Premier League. In total, 11 teams were eligible to qualify.)
2021	**CF Montréal** (11)	Toronto FC	1–0	13
2022	**Vancouver Whitecaps FC** (2)	Toronto FC	1–1 (5–3 p)	13
2023	**Vancouver Whitecaps FC** (3)	CF Montréal	2–1	14
2024	**Vancouver Whitecaps FC** (4)	Toronto FC	0–0 (4–2 p)	14
2025	**Vancouver Whitecaps FC** (5)	Vancouver FC	4–2	15
2026	**Forge FC**	CF Montréal	1–1 (4–2 p)	15

=== Titles by club ===
As of 2026 Canadian Championship.

Rank	Club	Winners	Runners-up	Years won
1	**Montreal Impact / CF Montréal**	11	4	2002, 2003, 2004, 2005, 2006, 2007, 2008, 2013, 2014, 2019, 2021
2	**Toronto FC**	8	6	2009, 2010, 2011, 2012, 2016, 2017, 2018, 2020
3	**Vancouver Whitecaps FC**	5	9	2015, 2022, 2023, 2024, 2025
4	**Forge FC**	1	1	2026
5	Toronto Lynx*	0	4	
6	**Vancouver FC**	0	1	

- * denotes team is no longer in operation.
- **Bolded** teams contested for the Voyageurs Cup in the 2026 Canadian Championship.
- Statistics for CF Montréal include the original Montreal Impact of the USL and NASL, who contested the trophy from 2002 to 2011, before being replaced by a new MLS franchise of the same name and ownership.
- Statistics for Vancouver Whitecaps FC include the original Vancouver Whitecaps of the USL, who contested the trophy from 2002 to 2010, before being replaced by a new MLS franchise of the same name and ownership.

== Top goalscorers ==
As of September 25, 2024

Rank	Player	Club(s)	Nationality	Goals
1	Eduardo Sebrango	Vancouver Whitecaps/Montreal Impact	Cuba	11
2	Ze Roberto	Montreal Impact	Brazil	10
3	Ali Gerba	Toronto Lynx/Montreal Impact	Canada	9
4	**Jonathan Osorio**	Toronto FC	Canada	8
5	Jozy Altidore	Toronto FC	United States	6
5	Charles Gbeke	Toronto Lynx/Montreal Impact/Vancouver Whitecaps	Canada	6
5	Sebastian Giovinco	Toronto FC	Italy	6
5	**Sunusi Ibrahim**	CF Montréal	Nigeria	6
5	Ignacio Piatti	Montreal Impact	Argentina	6
10	Tomi Ameobi	FC Edmonton	England	5
10	**Ryan Gauld**	Vancouver Whitecaps FC	Scotland	5
10	**Jordan Hamilton**	Toronto FC/Forge FC	Canada	5
10	**Deandre Kerr**	Toronto FC	Canada	5
10	Sita-Taty Matondo	Montreal Impact/Toronto Lynx/Vancouver Whitecaps	Canada	5

Bolded players are still active players with a Canadian team.

== See also ==
- James River Cup
- Southern Derby
- Canadian Classique
- Cascadia Cup
