= Zé Roberto (footballer, born 1978) =

Brazilian footballer

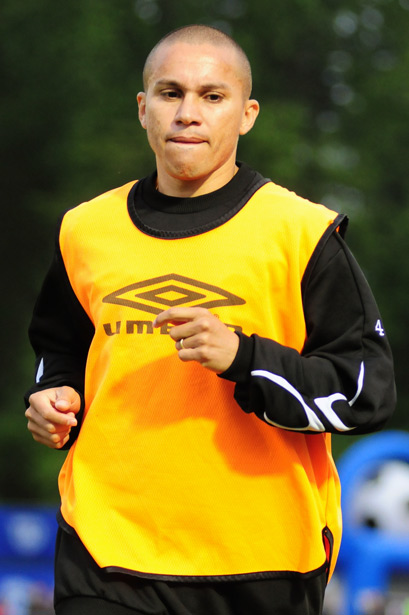

Personal information
- Full name: José Roberto Gomes Santana
- Date of birth: September 13, 1978 (age 48)
- Place of birth: Pastos Bons, Brazil
- Height: 5 ft 7 in (1.70 m)
- Position: Midfielder

Senior career*
Years	Team	Apps	(Gls)
1998–2000	Tuna Luso Brasileira		
1998	→ Palmeiras (loan)		
1999	→ Corinthians (loan)		
1999	→ Seà San Carlese (loan)		
2000–2001	Harrisburg Heat (indoor)	33	(3)
2002–2003	Harrisburg Heat (indoor)	28	(11)
2000–2001	Hershey Wildcats	50	(9)
2002–2007	Montreal Impact	138	(17)
2003–2005	Philadelphia KiXX (indoor)	56	(19)
2007	Vancouver Whitecaps	6	(0)
2007–2008	Detroit Ignition (indoor)	29	(7)
2007–2009	Rochester Rhinos	32	(4)
2009–2022	San Diego Sockers (indoor)	171	(26)
- * Club domestic league appearances and goals as of 16 December 2022

José Roberto Gomes Santana, commonly known as Zé Roberto (born September 13, 1978, in Pastos Bons) is an association footballer who last played for the San Diego Sockers in the Major Arena Soccer League.

Zé Roberto began his career in his native Brazil, where he played with several clubs in the lower divisions. In 2002, he went abroad to North America to sign with the Hershey Wildcats of the A-League. After the Wildcats folded, Zé Roberto was signed by the Montreal Impact in 2002. In Montreal he played an important role that would transform the Impact into a league powerhouse that would eventually dominate the league for latter part of the decade. His accolades during his tenure with Montreal include the League Championship, Regular-Season Championship, and the Voyageurs Cup. In January, 2010 he was ranked 22nd in the USL First Division Top 25 of the Decade, which announced a list of the best and most influential players of the previous decade.

== Career ==
Midway through the 2007 season, Zé Roberto was traded to the Vancouver Whitecaps on July 26, 2007, along with Alen Marcina for Joey Gjertsen and David Testo. On April 9, 2008, Zé Roberto, Luke Kreamalmeyer and Leslie Fitzpatrick were signed by the Rochester Rhinos for the 2008 season.

On February 17, 2009, the Rhinos announced the re-signing of Zé Roberto and striker Chris Sanders to a one-year deal with a one-year option for 2010. They did not exercise the option, and signed with the San Diego Sockers in the Major Arena Soccer League at the end of the Rhinos' 2009 outdoor season. At age 41, Zé Roberto was still on the Sockers' roster in 2020, having played in 14 of 24 games during their 2018–19 season.
