= Complexe sportif Claude-Robillard =

Sports facility in Quebec, Canada

Coordinates: 45°33′14.83″N 73°38′11.87″W

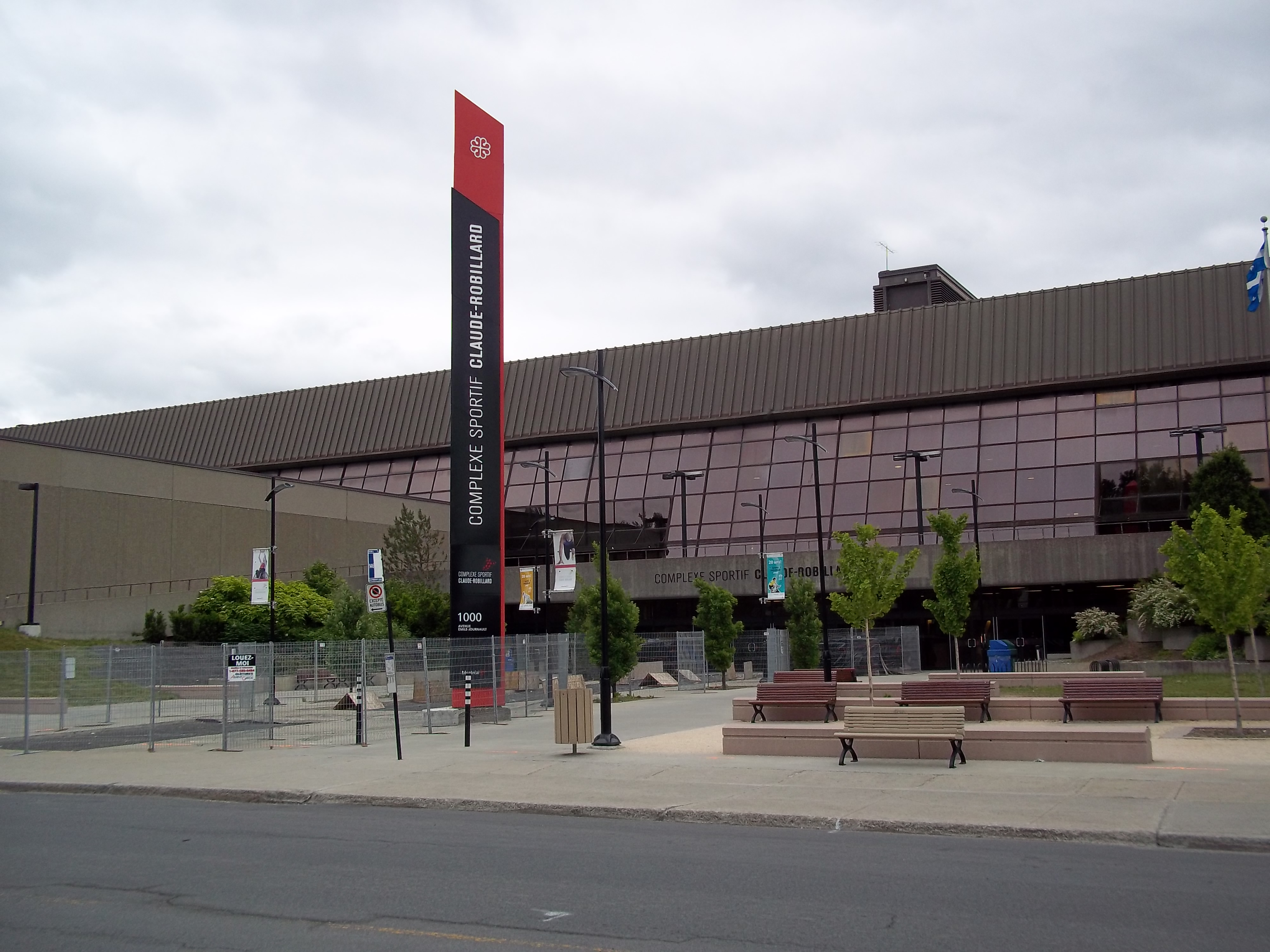
Complexe sportif Claude-Robillard

The Complexe sportif Claude-Robillard (French: [kɔ̃plɛks spɔʁtif klod ʁobijɑʁ]), abbreviated CSCR and often referred as Centre Claude-Robillard, is a multi-purpose sport facility, located in Montreal, Quebec, Canada, in the borough of Ahuntsic-Cartierville.

== History ==
The Complexe sportif Claude-Robillard was built for the 1976 Summer Olympics. It played host to the handball and water polo competitions as well as being the training centre for athletics, swimming and field hockey during the games.

== Overview ==
The facility is made up of two buildings: the Michel-Normandin arena and the main building itself. At the heart of the facility lie a ten-lane Olympic-size swimming pool and smaller pool with diving towers, home to the award-winning CAMO swim club, as well as an indoor track, an omni-sport training room and a number of gymnasiums. On the grounds lie a number of other installations: a running track, a regulation-sized soccer pitch, a second pitch with an artificial surface, originally designed for field hockey, but resurfaced in 2006 and configured for soccer and Canadian football, tennis courts, baseball diamonds, and so forth. The running track and the large soccer pitch sit in the middle of a 6,500-seat stadium. In the summer of 2024, a number of the tennis courts were reconfigured as pickleball courts.

The facility plays host to many national and international sporting competitions. Yearly events include the Jeux de Montreal and the Défi sportif (for handicapped athletes). The facility is also the headquarters for a number of clubs, some of which participate at an elite level, while others, such as Sports Montréal and APADOR, provide services to the general public.

Montreal's soccer team, the Montreal Impact, played its home games on the large soccer pitch from 1993 to 2007 and both the professional team and its academy trained there until 2015. Montreal Impact's USL-Pro affiliate FC Montreal played their games at Complexe sportif Claude-Robillard in 2016.

Complexe sportif Claude-Robillard is currently the home venue for the Montreal Royal of the Ultimate Frisbee Association (UFA).

On May 8, 2024 Ligue1 Québec champions CS Saint-Laurent hosted MLS side Toronto FC in a Canadian Championship quarter-final match in front of 6482 spectators at Complexe sportif Claude-Robillard.

== Origin of the name ==
The Complexe sportif Claude-Robillard was named for Claude Robillard, who was the first director of the City of Montreal's urban planning department.

== High-performance training ==
The Complexe sportif Claude-Robillard is a centre for high-performance training for a number of sports, including:

- Archery
- Badminton
- Baseball
- Boxing
- Canadian football
- Diving
- Fencing
- Figure skating
- Gymnastics
- Handball
- Judo
- Karate
- Soccer
- Softball
- Speed skating
- Squash
- Swimming
- Table tennis
- Track and field
- Ultimate Frisbee
- Water polo
- Weightlifting
- Wrestling

== Gallery ==
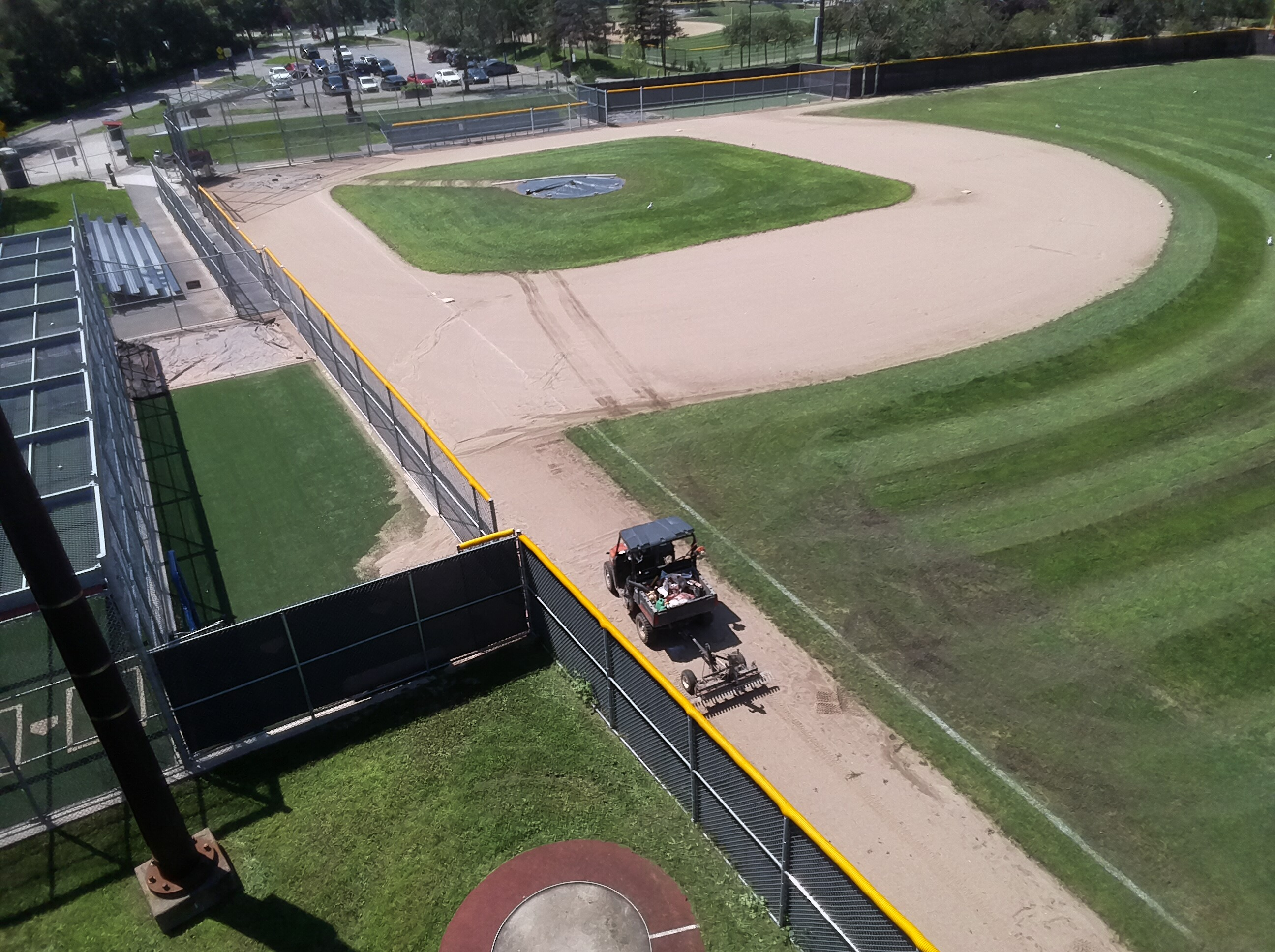
Baseball field

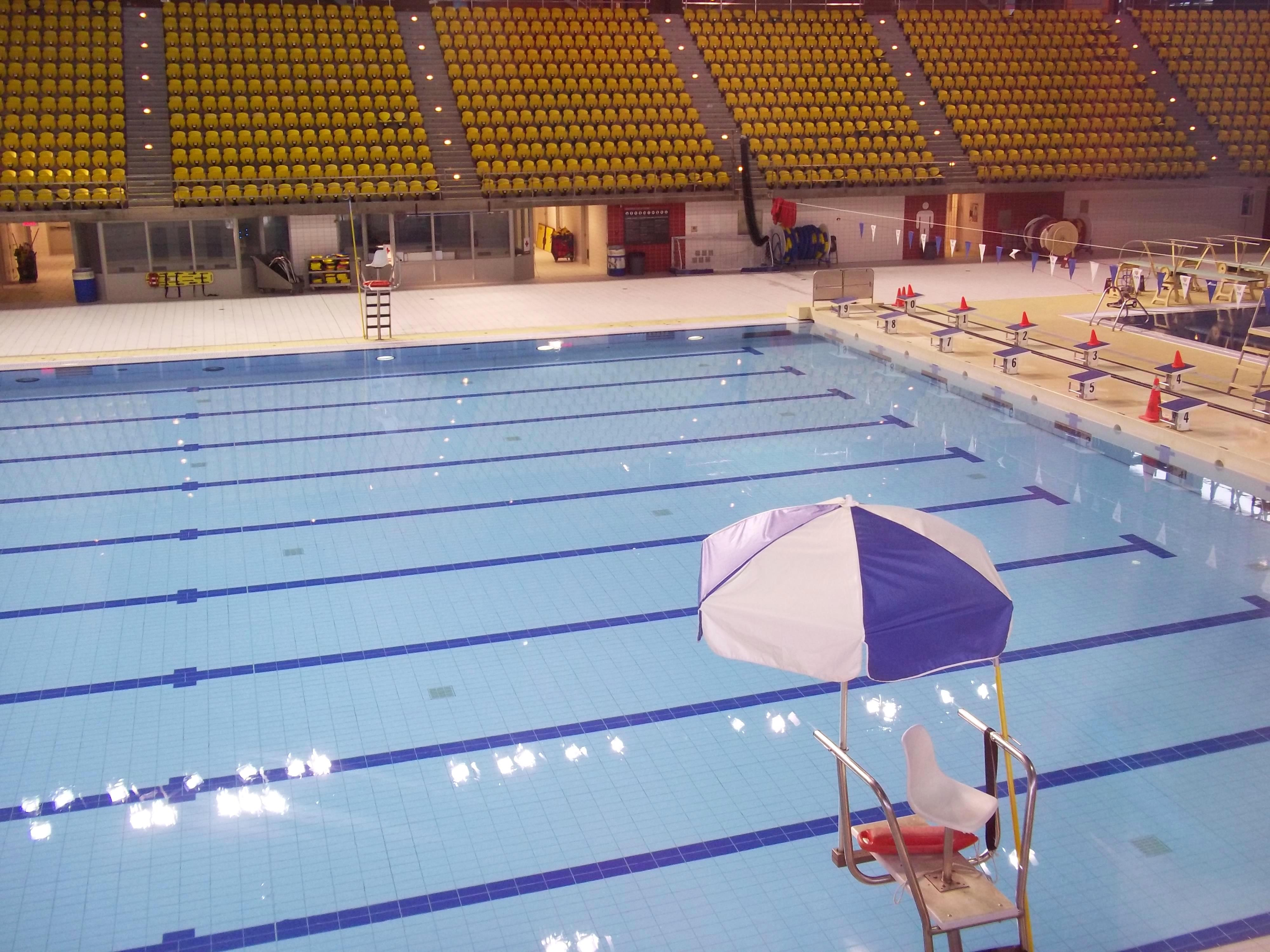
Olympic-size swimming pool

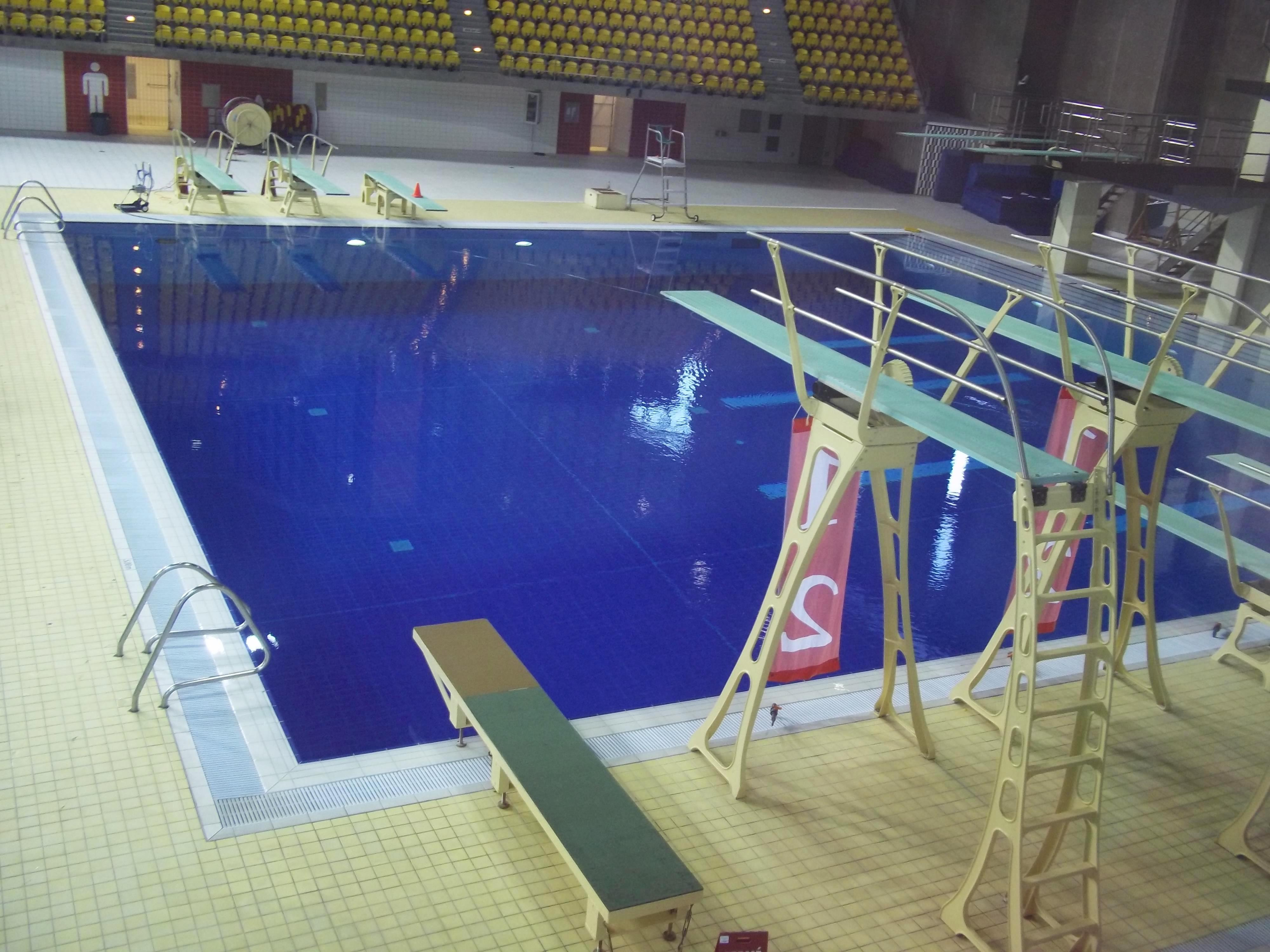
Diving pool

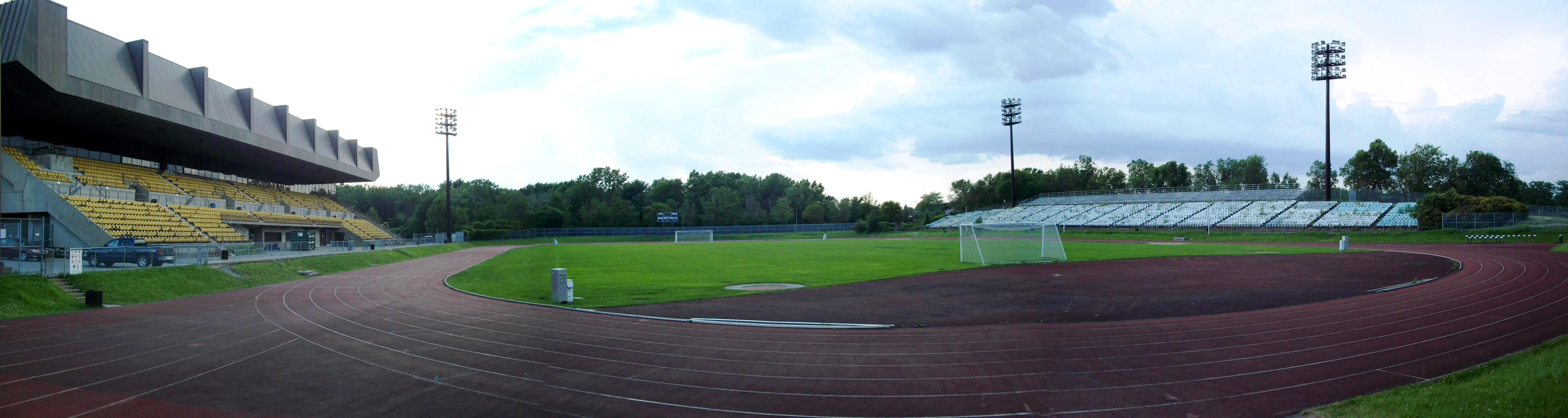
Track and field stadium

| First | Home of the Montreal Impact; 1993–2007 | Succeeded by Saputo Stadium |
