= Jason Jordan (soccer) =

Canadian soccer player (born 1978)

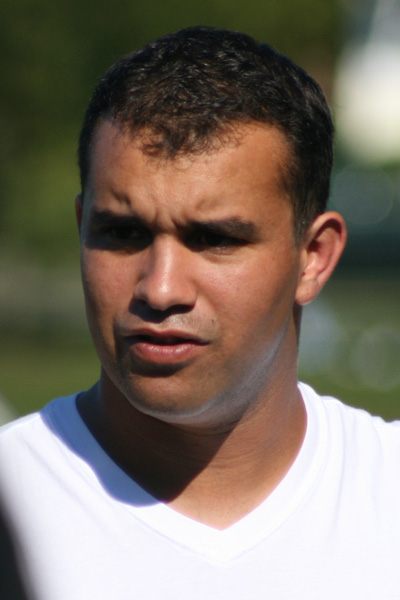

Personal information
- Date of birth: May 30, 1978 (age 48)
- Place of birth: Richmond, British Columbia, Canada
- Height: 5 ft 10 in (1.78 m)
- Position: Forward

Youth career
- 1994–1996: Richmond United

College career
Years	Team	Apps	(Gls)
1998–1999	Langara College		

Senior career*
Years	Team	Apps	(Gls)
1997–2008	Vancouver 86ers/Whitecaps	257	(78)

International career
1996–1997	Canada U20	7	(2)
1998–2000	Canada U23	6	(0)
2003	Canada Futsal	3	(0)

Managerial career
- 2008–2009: Vancouver Selects (head coach)
- 2009–2011: Crofton House Varsity
- 2009–2010: Coastal WFC (U-16 Boys)
- 2009–2021: Vancouver FC (technical director)
- 2011–: Fusion FC (technical director)
- * Club domestic league appearances and goals

Jason Jordan (born May 30, 1978) is a Canadian retired professional soccer player who played for the Vancouver Whitecaps in the First Division of the United Soccer Leagues. He is Vancouver's third all-time leading scorer with 74 goals in 207 games. Jordan is also the Technical Director of the CSA National Youth Licensed Club, Fusion Football Club.

== Club career ==
Born in Richmond, British Columbia, Jordan began playing college soccer at Langara College in 1998 and 1999. He signed with the Vancouver 86ers in 1997.

In June 2002, he turned down a contract offer from the Colorado Rapids of Major League Soccer in favour of remaining with the Whitecaps.

In the 2005 season he enjoyed a career year with the Whitecaps being named 2005 USL First Division MVP and lead the league with 17 goals. That same year, Jordan was named Whitecaps Player of the Year, was presented with the "Domenic Mobilio Golden Boot", and shared the Supporter's MVP award with goalkeeper Mike Franks.

Unfortunately, he suffered numerous injuries in 2006 that restricted him to playing only six games in the regular season and two games in the playoffs. Despite limited action, he tallied two assists and fired six shots in his regular season appearances as the Whitecaps won the USL First Division Championship, beating the Rochester Raging Rhinos 3–0.

On December 19, 2008, Jordan was released from the Vancouver Whitecaps and retired few days later.

== International career ==
Jordan played on the Canada Under-20 and Under-23 national teams.

Jordan has also represented Canada at the CONCACAF Mens U20 in Mexico, FIFA Youth World Cup in Malaysia, and as a member of the U23 National Team at the PAN-AM Games. In 2003, he was on the Canadian National Futsal team and in 2005 with Frank Yallop's National Team squad in the US.

== Coaching career ==
Jordan is technical director of Fusion Football Club, a CSA National Youth Licensed Club based in Vancouver and Richmond that has teams in the British Columbia Soccer Premier League and BC Coastal Soccer League.

He has been involved with the Vancouver Selects, Crofton House, Whitecaps FC Academy, and Coastal FC and is the founding technical director of Fusion FC and Vancouver FC.

== Honours ==
Vancouver Whitecaps FC

- USL First Division Championship: 2006, 2008

Canada U20

- CONCACAF U-20 Championship: 1996

Individual

- USL First Division Most Valuable Player: 2005
- USL First Division Scoring and Goal Scoring Champion: 2005
- USL First Division All-League First Team: 2005
