= Calgary Mustangs (USL) =

Canadian soccer team

Calgary Storm (2001–2003) Calgary Mustangs (2004)
- Full name: Calgary Mustangs Soccer Club
- Nicknames: Storm, Mustangs
- Founded: 2001 (as Calgary Storm)
- Dissolved: 2004
- Stadium: Foothills Stadium (USL PDL), (USL A-League); McMahon Stadium (USL A-League)
- League: USL PDL (2001); USL A-League (2002–2004)
| Home colours | Away colours |

The Calgary Mustangs (formerly the Calgary Storm and Team Calgary) were a soccer team in Calgary, Alberta, that played in the semi-professional USL Premier Development League in 2001 and the professional USL A-League from 2002 to 2004.

== History ==

In 2001, the Calgary Storm was formed to play in the semi-professional USL Premier Development League. They finished as the regular season champions and in the playoffs advanced to the Championship final, where they finished as runner-ups after being defeated by the Westchester Flames.

In 2002, the Storm moved to the professional USL A-League. In their debut professional season, the Storm finished last in their division failing to qualify for the playoffs. During the season, the season was complicated by player walkouts, a coach's firing, financial problems that forced several players to play without being paid, and some games being played without substitutes available.

In 2003, the team once again continued to struggle in the standings, once again finishing last in their division. During the season, team owner Michael Vandale resigned as team owner citing personal issues and mounting financial losses, handing over the operation of the team to the United Soccer Leagues, who would seek a new ownership group. The USL managed the team for the remainder of the season, with funding pooled from the other 18 A-League franchises, who approved the decision to take over operation of the team, with the team finishing the season under the name Team Calgary.

For 2004, a new ownership group consisting of Storm head coach Thomas Niendorf, John Torode, and Juergen Hanne were granted the rights to the franchise, choosing to operate the franchise as a non-profit organization. The team continued in the USL A-League, changing its name to the Calgary Mustangs for the 2004 season (a previous team in the Canadian Professional Soccer League had operated as the Calgary Mustangs in 1983). Following another last place finish, the Mustangs halted operations following the 2005 season, initially planning to return for the 2006 season, however, they ultimately never returned.

The team never acquired a significant profile in the Calgary sports marketplace and never had great fan support. The USL PDL Calgary Storm averaged 2,003 fans per game at Foothills Stadium. In their final season the team's average attendance was just 1,258 at 35,650 capacity McMahon Stadium.

== Year-by-year ==
| Year | Division | League | Reg. season | Playoffs | Voyageurs Cup |
|---|---|---|---|---|---|
| 2001 | 4 | USL PDL | 1st, League | Runner-up | N/A |
| 2002 | 2 | USL A-League | 5th, Pacific | Did not qualify | 4th |
| 2003 | 2 | USL A-League | 4th, Pacific | Did not qualify | 4th |
| 2004 | 2 | USL A-League | 6th, Western | Did not qualify | 5th |

== Honours ==
- USL PDL Regular Season Champions: 2001

== Reserve Team ==
After the Storm moved to the A-League from the PDL following the 2001 season, the club established a second team in the PDL known as the Calgary Storm Select, later known as the Calgary Storm Prospects in 2003. After the first team was taken over by the league mid-season in 2003, the reserve team was disbanded, with the Abbotsford Rangers who were operating a provisional league member taking over the remainder of their fixtures.
