= Eduardo Sebrango =

Cuban footballer (born 1973)

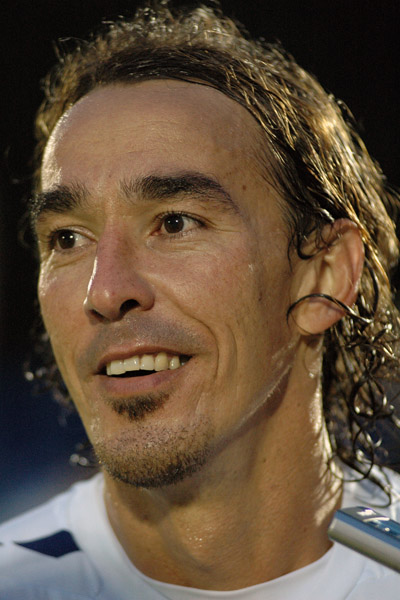
- Sebrango in 2008

Personal information
- Full name: Eduardo Cebranco Rodríguez
- Date of birth: 13 April 1973 (age 53)
- Place of birth: Sancti Spiritus, Cuba
- Height: 6 ft 1 in (1.85 m)
- Position: Forward

Team information
- Current team: CF Montréal (assistant coach)

Youth career
- 1984–1991: Sancti Spíritus

Senior career*
| Years | Team | Apps | (Gls) |
| 1992–1998 | Sancti Spíritus | 123 | (75) |
| 1999 | Vancouver 86ers | 27 | (18) |
| 2000 | Rochester Raging Rhinos | 24 | (6) |
| 2001 | Hershey Wildcats | 16 | (8) |
| 2002–2005 | Montreal Impact | 83 | (36) |
| 2006–2008 | Vancouver Whitecaps | 54 | (21) |
| 2009–2011 | Montreal Impact (USL/NASL) | 64 | (15) |
| 2012 | Montreal Impact | 7 | (0) |
| 2013 | FC L'Assomption | 19 | (5) |
| Total | | 417 | (184) |

International career^{‡}
| 1996–1998 | Cuba | 23 | (13) |

Managerial career
- 2022: CF Montréal U23 (assistant)
- 2023: CF Montréal (assistant)
- * Club domestic league appearances and goals as of 12 April 2016 ‡ National team caps and goals as of 13 May 2009

Eduardo Sebrango Rodríguez (born 13 April 1973) is a Cuban former professional footballer who is currently an assistant coach for Major League Soccer club CF Montréal.

== Club career ==
Sebrango started his career in Cuba with his hometown team, Sancti Spíritus where he played with the club for 14 seasons as both a youth and a senior player.

=== Vancouver 86ers ===
Sebrango immigrated from Cuba to Canada in 1999, and was subsequently signed by the Vancouver 86ers of the then A-League. He scored 18 goals and recorded 10 assists for Vancouver before being signed by Hershey Wildcats in 2001.

=== Montreal Impact ===
In 2002 Sebrango was signed by Montreal Impact, and in his first season he scored 18 goals in 28 games and was named to the USL First Division All-Star Team. In 2004 Sebrango helped the Impact lift the USL First Division championship trophy as the Impact defeated the Seattle Sounders 2–0 on 18 September. During the regular season, Sebrango contributed eight goals and three assists. In total Sebrango appeared in 83 games, notching 36 goals and six assists making him the second All-Time scorer for the club.

=== Return to Vancouver ===
In 2006 Sebrango was traded to the Vancouver Whitecaps FC in exchange for Daniel Antoniuk. With the 'Caps he played an important playoff role where he scored a goal in a 2–0 victory over Miami FC. In the semi-final game he scored a memorable goal against his former team Montreal Impact which the Caps won 2–0. Unfortunately, Sebrango was ejected from the game after scoring his goal for excessive celebration for removing his shirt, and was suspended for the final. With Sebrango in the stands, his team were able to win the USL First Division Championship beating the Rochester Raging Rhinos 3–0, his third title with three different teams.

In 2008 Sebrango led the Whitecaps in regular season scoring with 12 goals and three assists for 27 points in 29 matches. Sebrango also had two goals in three Nutrilite Canadian Championship games and two goals in five playoff matches. He played a significant role to help the Whitecaps win their second USL First Division championship in three years.

On 30 September 2008 was called up for the USL First Division All-League Team.

=== Return to Montreal ===
In November 2008, Sebrango was signed once again by Montreal Impact. In his first appearance back with the Impact, Sebrango scored Montreal's two goals in the first game of the CONCACAF Champions League quarterfinal against Santos Laguna.

During the 2009 USL season Sebrango contributed by helping the Impact clinch a playoff spot under new head coach Marc Dos Santos. On 22 July Sebrango scored both his 99th and 100th career goals in the USL First Division in a thrilling 4–1 victory over the Cleveland City Stars. In the playoffs, he recorded his first goal in the second match against the Puerto Rico Islanders of the semifinals. He scored the winning goal for the Impact in a 2–1 victory which allowed the Impact to advance to the finals. In the playoffs their opponents would end up being the Vancouver Whitecaps FC this marking the first time in USL history where the final match would consist of two Canadian clubs. On 10 October 2009 in the first match of the finals Sebrango scored once again the winning goal in 3–2 victory at Vancouver. Montreal would later on win the second match to a score of 3–1, thus making Montreal win the series 6–3 on aggregate. The victory gave the Impact their third USL Championship and also the victory marked Sebrango's league record fifth USL Championship (including the USL's predecessor, the A-League).

Sebrango retired before the 2011 season but then re-joined Montreal in mid-season 2011. The following year Sebrango moved with Montreal Impact to Major League Soccer as the club became the 19th team in MLS.

=== FC L'Assomption ===
Sebrango announced his (second) retirement on 1 November 2012 following Montreal Impact's inaugural season in MLS. He has signed with semi-pro Division 3 side FC L'Assomption of the Première Ligue de soccer du Québec for the 2013 season.

== International career ==
Sebrango was a regular with the Cuba national team between 1996 and 1998, and played 23 games, scoring 13 goals prior to immigrating to Canada. He represented his country in 10 FIFA World Cup qualification matches (4 goals).

His final international was a February 1998 CONCACAF Gold Cup match against Costa Rica.

== Managerial career ==
In addition to his playing career, Sebrango is a coach for the North Shore Player Premier Program Club, coaching the U-14 Metro Selects Club.

In January 2023, Sebrango was promoted to CF Montréal first-team staff after spending 2022 as an assistant with Montréal's U23 side.

== Personal ==
Following his departure from Cuba, Sebrango became a Canadian citizen. However, he was ineligible to play for the Canadian national team due to his prior appearances for Cuba. Sebrango completed a degree in physical education at Filial Universitaria in Sancti Spiritus, Cuba. While it has frequently been misreported by the media, Eduardo did not defect from Cuba but rather immigrated to Canada as a permanent resident. He remains proud of his country and heritage and returns to Cuba often to be with his family.

His son, Donovan, is an ice hockey player and was selected by the Detroit Red Wings 63rd overall, in the 2020 NHL entry draft.

== Honours ==
Rochester Rhinos

- USL First Division: 2000

Montreal Impact

- USL First Division: 2004, 2009
- USL First Division Commissioner's Cup: 2005
- Voyageurs Cup: 2002, 2003, 2004, 2005

Vancouver Whitecaps

- USL First Division Championship: 2006, 2008

Individual

- Canadian Championship Golden Boot: 2008 (co-winner)

== Career stats ==
| Team | Season | League | Domestic League | | Domestic Playoffs | | Domestic Cup^{1} | | Concacaf Competition^{2} | | Total | |
| Team | Season | League | Apps | Goals | Apps | Goals | Apps | Goals | Apps | Goals | Apps | Goals |
|---|---|---|---|---|---|---|---|---|---|---|---|---|
| Vancouver 86ers | 1999 | A-League | 27 | 18 | 1 | 0 | - | - | - | - | 28 | 18 |
| Rochester Rhinos | 2000 | A-League | 24 | 6 | 6 | 0 | 2 | 0 | - | - | 32 | 6 |
| Hershey Wildcats | 2001 | A-League | 16 | 8 | 2 | 0 | 1 | 0 | - | - | 19 | 8 |
| Montreal Impact | 2002 | A-League | 28 | 18 | 4 | 1 | - | - | - | - | 32 | 19 |
| Montreal Impact | 2003 | A-League | 20 | 6 | 2 | 0 | - | - | - | - | 22 | 6 |
| Montreal Impact | 2004 | A-League | 23 | 8 | 5 | 2 | - | - | - | - | 28 | 10 |
| Montreal Impact | 2005 | USL-1 | 12 | 4 | 2 | 0 | - | - | - | - | 14 | 4 |
| Vancouver Whitecaps FC | 2006 | USL-1 | 9 | 2 | 3 | 2 | - | - | - | - | 12 | 4 |
| Vancouver Whitecaps FC | 2007 | USL-1 | 16 | 7 | 2 | 0 | - | - | - | - | 18 | 7 |
| Vancouver Whitecaps FC | 2008 | USL-1 | 29 | 12 | 5 | 2 | 3 | 2 | - | - | 37 | 16 |
| Montreal Impact | 2008 | USL-1 | - | - | - | - | - | - | 2 | 3 | 2 | 3 |
| Montreal Impact | 2009 | USL-1 | 28 | 4 | 6 | 2 | 3 | 0 | - | - | 37 | 6 |
| Montreal Impact | 2010 | USSF-D2 | 25 | 5 | 4 | 1 | 3 | 0 | - | - | 32 | 6 |
| Montreal Impact | 2011 | NASL | 13 | 6 | - | - | - | - | - | - | 13 | 6 |
| Career Total | | | 270 | 104 | 42 | 10 | 12 | 2 | 2 | 3 | 326 | 119 |

1. Lamar Hunt U.S. Open Cup (American Based Clubs) - Nutrilite Canadian Cup (Canadian Based Clubs)
2. CONCACAF Champions League
