= All-time Montreal Impact (1992–2011) roster =

This list comprises all players who have participated in at least one league match for Montreal Impact since the USL began keeping archived records in 2003. Players who were on the roster but never played a first team game are not listed; players who appeared for the team in other competitions (Open Canada Cup, CONCACAF Champions League, etc.) but never actually made an USL appearance are noted at the bottom of the page where appropriate.

A "†" denotes players who only appeared in a single match.
A "*" denotes players who are known to have appeared for the team prior to 2003.

== A ==
- (Morocco) Hicham Aâboubou
- (United States) Luis Aguilar
- (Canada) Reda Agourram
- (Bolivia) Roland Aguilera
- (United States) Dan Antoniuk
- (Colombia) Andres Arango
- (Togo) Zanzan Atte-Oudeyi

== B ==
- (Trinidad and Tobago) Joel John Bailey
- (Jamaica) Lloyd Barker
- (Jamaica) Dwight Barnett
- (United States) Valery Jean-Louis Besse
- (Canada) Eddy Berdusco *
- (Canada) Patrice Bernier *
- (Canada) Mauro Biello
- (France) Philippe Billy
- (Canada) Adam Braz
- (Canada) Félix Brillant
- (Panama) Roberto Brown
- (Canada) Nikola Budalić
- (United States) Evan Bush
- (Antigua and Barbuda) Peter Byers

== C ==
- (France) Hassoun Camara
- (Canada) Adrian Cann
- (Canada) Paolo Ceccarelli *
- (Saint Vincent and the Grenadines) Wesley Charles
- (Canada) Ian Clarke
- (Ghana) Frederick Commodore
- (Canada) Kevin Cossette

== D ==
- (Morocco) Youssef Dahha *
- (Canada) Nick Dasović *
- (Jamaica) Fabian Dawkins
- (Canada) Nick De Santis *
- (Canada) Jason de Vos *
- (Jamaica) Stephen deRoux
- (Canada) Massimo Di Ioia
- (Argentina) Leonardo Di Lorenzo
- (Senegal) Mignane Diouf
- (Canada) Patrick Diotte *
- (Canada) David Diplacido
- (Canada) Jason DiTullio
- (Canada) Srdjan Djekanović
- (Canada) Rudy Doliscat *
- (United States) Tony Donatelli
- (England) Paul Dougherty *
- (Canada) Frank Depatie

== E ==
- (France) Idriss Ech-Chergui
- (Canada) David Ettedgui *

== F ==
- (United States) Martin Fabro
- (Canada) Patrice Ferri *
- (Canada) Carl Fletcher *
- (Canada) Abraham Francois
- (Canada) David Fronimadis
- (Japan) Masahiro Fukasawa

== G ==
- (The Gambia) Pa Amadou Gai
- (United States) Carlos Garcia
- (Canada) Simon Gatti
- (Canada) Charles Gbeke
- (Canada) Ali Gerba
- (Canada) Gabriel Gervais
- (United States) Joey Gjertsen
- (Canada) Sandro Grande
- (Antigua and Barbuda) Gayson Gregory

== H ==
- (Canada) André Hainault
- (United States) Jean Harbor *
- (Canada) Pat Harrington *
- (France) Kevin Hatchi
- (Canada) Tyler Hemming
- (Canada) Lyndon Hooper *

== I ==
- (Romania) Mircea Ilcu
- (Canada) Leo Incollingo

== J ==
- (Brazil) Severino Jefferson
- (France) Cédric Joqueviel
- (United States) Matt Jordan

== K ==
- (United States) Drew Kopp
- (Canada) Tom Kouzmanis
- (New Zealand) Cameron Knowles
- (Serbia) Darko Kolić
- (United States) Luke Kreamalmeyer

== L ==
- (Mexico) Luis Labastida
- (United States) Yuri Lavrinenko
- (France) Anthony Le Gall
- (Canada) Patrick Leduc
- (United States) Chris Lemire
- (Canada) Nicolas Lesage
- (Canada) John Limniatis *
- (Jamaica) Onandi Lowe *
- (United States) Amir Lowery
- (United States) Lars Lyssand

== M ==
- (United States) Rachid Madkour
- (Canada) Alen Marcina
- (Canada) Sita-Taty Matondo
- (Canada) Elkana Mayard
- (Canada) Pierre-Rudolph Mayard
- (Trinidad and Tobago) Larry McDonald
- (Canada) Mesut Mert
- (Colombia) Miguel Montaño
- (Brazil) Frederico Moojen
- (Northern Ireland) Tommy Moreland *

== N ==
- (Canada) Grant Needham *
- (Canada) Christian Nuñez

== O ==
- (United States) Ciaran O'Brien
- (United States) Leighton O'Brien
- (Canada) Andrew Olivieri
- (Canada) Giuliano Oliveiro *

== P ==
- (Canada) Matthew Palleschi
- (Portugal) Filipe Pastel
- (Brazil) Paulinho *
- (France) Richard Pelletier
- (Italy) Stefano Pesoli
- (Canada) Nicolas Pinto
- (Canada) Nevio Pizzolitto
- (Canada) Rocco Placentino
- (United States) Ryan Pore

== R ==
- (Canada) António Ribeiro
- (United States) Mark Rowland
- (Canada) Jocelyn Roy

== S ==
- (United States) Kevin Sakuda
- (Brazil) Mauricio Salles
- (Cuba) Eduardo Sebrango
- (United States) Bill Sedgewick
- (Canada) Kyriakos Selaidopoulos
- (Canada) Chris Stathopoulos
- (Canada) Alex Surprenant
- (Canada) Greg Sutton

== T ==
- (Canada) Marco Terminesi
- (United States) David Testo
- (United States) Seth Trembly
- (United States) Steve Trittschuh
- (Georgia (country)) Zourab Tsiskaridze
- (Canada) Pierre-Richard Thomas

== U ==
- (Burundi) Davy Uwimana

== V ==
- (Argentina) Gustavo Villagra †
- (Argentina) Mauricio Vincello

== W ==
- (United States) Andrew Weber
- (England) Ian Westlake
- (Canada) Chris Williams
- (Jamaica) Kevin Wilson
- (United States) Kirk Wilson

== Z ==
- (Brazil) Zé Roberto

== Sources ==
- "USL-1 Team History". uslsoccer.com. United Soccer Leagues. Archived from the original on 2013-02-08.
