= 2011 Montreal Impact season =

Montreal Impact
2011 season
- Chairman: (Canada) Joey Saputo
- Head coach: (Canada) Nick De Santis
- North American Soccer League: Regular Season: 7th Playoffs: Did not qualify
- 2011 Canadian Championship: Semifinals
- Top goalscorer: League: Etienne Barbara (20); All: Ryan Pore (7)
- Highest home attendance: 13,034
- Lowest home attendance: 9,870
- Average home league attendance: 11,514
Home colours	Away colours	Third colours

The 2011 Montreal Impact season was the 18th season of the franchise. It was the club's final season in the NASL before a new Major League Soccer club of the same name, with the same ownership replaces the Impact for the 2012 season.

== Standings ==
=== Conference table ===
Pos	Team	Pld	W	D	L	GF	GA	GD	Pts	Qualification
4	Fort Lauderdale Strikers	28	9	11	8	35	36	−1	38	Playoff quarterfinals
5	FC Edmonton	28	10	6	12	35	40	−5	36 (Note: EDM: 8 pts; MIN: 2 pts)	Playoff quarterfinals
6	NSC Minnesota Stars (C)	28	9	9	10	30	32	−2	36	Playoff quarterfinals
7	Montreal Impact	28	9	8	11	35	27	+8	35	
8	Atlanta Silverbacks	28	4	4	20	25	63	−38	16	

Source: NASL Standings
Rules for classification: 1) points; 2) head-to-head record; 3) goal difference; 4) number of goals scored.
(C) Champions

=== Results summary ===
Overall								Home						Away					
Pld	Pts	W	L	T	GF	GA	GD	W	L	T	GF	GA	GD	W	L	T	GF	GA	GD
28	35	9	11	8	35	27	+8	6	2	6	20	11	+9	3	9	2	15	16	−1

Last updated: April 10, 2011
Source: Regular season matches
Pld = Matches played; Pts = Points; W = Matches won; T = Matches tied; L = Matches lost; GF = Goals for; GA = Goals against; GD = Goal difference

=== Results by round ===
Round	1	2	3	4	5	6	7	8	9	10	11	12	13	14	15	16	17	18	19	20	21	22	23	24	25	26	27	28
Ground	A	A	H	A	H	A	A	H	A	A	H	A	H	A	H	H	A	H	H	H	H	H	A	A	A	H	H	A
Result	L	L	T	W	L	L	T	W	L	L	T	L	T	L	T	T	L	W	L	T	W	W	W	L	T	W	W	W
Position	6	7	7	7	7	7	7	7	7	7	7	7	7	7	7	7	7	7	7	7	7	7	7	7	7	7	7	7

Updated to match(es) played on April 10, 2011. Source: Regular season matches
A = Away; H = Home; W = Win; L = Loss; T = Tie

== Current roster ==
=== Current roster ===
as of August 16, 2011.

Note: Flags indicate national team as defined under FIFA eligibility rules; some limited exceptions apply. Players may hold more than one non-FIFA nationality.

No.	Pos.	Nation	Player
1	GK	USA	Bill Gaudette
2	DF	MAR	Hicham Aâboubou
3	DF	NZL	Cameron Knowles
5	DF	CAN	Nevio Pizzolitto (captain)
6	MF	FRA	Hassoun Camara
7	MF	USA	David Testo
8	MF	USA	Luke Kreamalmeyer
10	FW	CAN	Ali Gerba
11	MF	ARG	Leonardo Di Lorenzo
12	DF	USA	Amir Lowery
14	FW	SEN	Mignane Diouf (on loan from Diambars)
15	FW	COL	Miguel Montaño (on loan from Seattle Sounders FC)
16	FW	CUB	Eduardo Sebrango
17	MF	FRA	Anthony Le Gall

No.	Pos.	Nation	Player
18	FW	CAN	Marco Terminesi
19	FW	CAN	Reda Agourram
21	DF	FRA	Philippe Billy
22	GK	USA	Evan Bush
23	MF	CAN	António Ribeiro
24	DF	CAN	Simon Gatti
25	GK	CAN	Greg Sutton (on loan from New York Red Bulls)
27	MF	ENG	Ian Westlake
28	MF	BIH	Siniša Ubiparipović
30	MF	CAN	Pierre-Rudolph Mayard
32	MF	USA	Ryan Pore (on loan from Portland Timbers)
33	FW	ROU	Mircea Ilcu
35	MF	FRA	Wandrille Lefevre

=== Multiple nationalities ===
- (Morocco) (Canada) Hicham Aâboubou
- (Argentina) (Canada) Leonardo Di Lorenzo
- (France) (Canada) Wandrille Lefevre
- (Romania) (Canada) Mircea Ilcu
- (Cuba) (Canada) Eduardo Sebrango
- (New Zealand) (United States) Cameron Knowles
- (Bosnia and Herzegovina) (United States) Siniša Ubiparipović

== Staff ==
- (Canada) Joey Saputo President
- (Canada) Richard Legendre Executive Vice President
- (Canada) John Di Terlizzi Vice President
- (Canada) Nick De Santis Sport Director
- (United States) Matt Jordan Director of Soccer Operations
- (Canada) Nick De Santis Head Coach
- (Canada) Mauro Biello Assistant Coach
- (Spain) Gil Orriols Jansana Assistant Coach
- (Morocco) Youssef Dahha Goalkeeper Coach
- (Canada) Adam Braz Team Manager
- (Canada) Véronique Fortin Director of Game-Day Operations & Promotions
- (Canada) Dr. Scott Delaney Team Physician

== Player movement ==
=== Transfers ===
==== In ====
Date	Player	Position	Previous club	Fee/notes	Ref
February 7, 2011	(France) Hassoun Camara	MF	(France) SC Bastia	Free Transfer	
February 10, 2011	(France) Idriss Ech-Chergui	FW	(Algeria) JS Kabylie	Free Transfer	
February 10, 2011	(France) Kevin Hatchi	DF	(Cyprus) Olympiakos Nicosia	Free Transfer	
February 17, 2011	(Georgia (country)) Zourab Tsiskaridze	DF	(Canada) Vancouver Whitecaps	Free Transfer	
February 17, 2011	(United States) Luke Kreamalmeyer	MF	(United States) AC St. Louis	Free Transfer	
February 19, 2011	(United States) Bill Gaudette	GK	Puerto Rico Islanders	Free Transfer	
March 11, 2011	(United States) Evan Bush	GK	(United States) Crystal Palace Baltimore	Free Transfer	
March 30, 2011	(United States) Amir Lowery	MF	(Finland) FC Honka	Free Transfer	
June 29, 2011	(Cuba) Eduardo Sebrango	FW	(Canada) Montreal Impact	Return from Retirement	
July 12, 2011	(Canada) Marco Terminesi	FW	(United States) Milwaukee Wave	Free Transfer	
July 12, 2011	(Romania) Mircea Ilcu	FW	(Canada) Montreal Impact Academy	Graduated from the Academy	
July 12, 2011	(France) Wandrille Lefevre	MF	(Canada) Montreal Impact Academy	Graduated from the Academy	
July 14, 2011	(England) Ian Westlake	MF	(England) Wycombe Wanderers F.C.	Free Transfer	
July 26, 2011	(New Zealand) Cameron Knowles	DF	(United States) Portland Timbers	Free Transfer	
August 2, 2011	(Bosnia and Herzegovina) Siniša Ubiparipović	MF	(United States) New York Red Bulls	Free Transfer	

==== Out ====
Date	Player	Position	Destination club	Fee/notes	Ref
October 28, 2010	(Cuba) Eduardo Sebrango	FW	None	Retired	
October 28, 2010	(Canada) Rocco Placentino	MF	(Italy) Perugia Calcio	Waived	
October 28, 2010	(Portugal) Filipe Pastel	MF	(Cyprus) Ermis Aradippou	Waived	
October 28, 2010	(Saint Vincent and the Grenadines) Wesley Charles	DF	(Republic of Ireland) Salthill Devon F.C.	Waived	
November 17, 2010	(Canada) Marco Terminesi	FW	(United States) Milwaukee Wave	Waived	
January 1, 2011	(Canada) Srdjan Djekanović	GK	None	Retired	
January 12, 2011	(Jamaica) Stephen deRoux	MF	(Antigua and Barbuda) Antigua Barracuda FC	Contract Expired	
January 28, 2011	(United States) Tony Donatelli	MF	(United States) Rochester Rhinos	Contract Expired, free transfer	
January 31, 2011	(United States) Matt Jordan	GK	None	Retired	
February 17, 2011	(Romania) Andrei Bădescu	GK		Waived	
March 14, 2011	(Canada) Adam Braz	DF	None	Retired	
March 29, 2011	(Canada) Patrick Leduc	DF	None	Retired	
June 15, 2011	(France) Kevin Hatchi	DF	(Canada) FC Edmonton	Released	
July 6, 2011	(France) Richard Pelletier	DF	(France) Stade Plabennecois	Option not renewed	
July 6, 2011	(France) Idriss Ech-Chergui	FW	(France) FC Martigues	Released	
July 19, 2011	(Georgia (country)) Zourab Tsiskaridze	DF	(Russia) FC Amkar Perm	Released	

=== Loans ===
==== In ====
Date	Player	Position	Loaned from	Fee/notes	Ref
May 6, 2011	(Senegal) Mignane Diouf	FW	(Senegal) Diambars	Loaned until the end of the season	
July 16, 2011	(Canada) Greg Sutton	GK	(United States) New York Red Bulls	Loaned until the end of the season	
July 22, 2011	(United States) Ryan Pore	MF	(United States) Portland Timbers	Loaned until the end of the season	
August 15, 2011	(Colombia) Miguel Montaño	FW	(United States) Seattle Sounders FC	Loaned until the end of the season	

== International caps ==
Players called for international duty during the 2011 season while under contract with the Montreal Impact.

Nationality	Position	Player	Competition	Date	Opponent
(Canada)	FW	Ali Gerba	Gold Cup	June 7, 2011	v USA, June 7, 2011
(Canada)	FW	Ali Gerba	Gold Cup	June 11, 2011	v Guadeloupe, June 11, 2011

== Awards ==
=== Team awards ===
Award	Name
Most Valuable Player	(France) Hassoun Camara
Defensive Player of the Year	(United States) Evan Bush
Unsong Hero	(Canada) Simon Gatti
Co Newcomer of the Year	(Bosnia and Herzegovina) Sinisa Ubiparipovic
Co Newcomer of the Year	(England) Ian Westlake

=== League awards ===
==== Weekly awards ====
Award	Name
Offensive player of the week (Week 4)	(Canada) Ali Gerba
Offensive player of the week (Week 21)	(Cuba) Eduardo Sebrango
Offensive player of the week (Week 27)	(United States) Ryan Pore
Defensive player of the week (Week 4)	(United States) Bill Gaudette
Defensive player of the week (Week 11)	(United States) Evan Bush
Defensive player of the week (Week 24)	(United States) Evan Bush
Player of the Month (September)	(United States) Evan Bush

==== Year end awards ====
Award	Name
Golden Glove Award	(United States) Evan Bush
NASL Starting IX	(France) Hassoun Camara

== Matches ==
=== Preseason ===
Win Tie Loss

February 23, 2011	Montreal Impact	0 – 1	Portland Timbers	Casa Grande, Arizona, USA
	Hicham Aâboubou (yellow card) 67'; Kevin Hatchi (yellow card) 76'	(report)	Eddie Johnson 7'	Stadium: Grande Sports World

February 26, 2011	Montreal Impact	0 – 2	Sporting Kansas City	Casa Grande, Arizona, USA
	Hassoun Camara (yellow card) 44'; António Ribeiro (yellow card) 63'	(report)	Nevio Pizzolitto 17' OG; C. J. Sapong 73'	Stadium: Grande Sports World

March 2, 2011	Montreal Impact	3 – 0	FC Dallas	Casa Grande, Arizona, USA
	António Ribeiro (yellow card) 4'; Ali Gerba 21'; Hassoun Camara (yellow card) 44'; Luke Kreamalmeyer 53'; Idriss Ech-Chergui 76'; Richard Pelletier (yellow card) 79'	(report)	Bruno Guarda (yellow card) 43'	Stadium: Grande Sports World

April 1, 2011	Montreal Impact	1 – 2	McGill University	Brossard, Quebec, Canada
	Luke Kreamalmeyer 80'	(report)	Sebastian Munro 70'; Alex King 75'	Stadium: Bell Sports Complex

=== NASL regular season ===
April 9, 2011	FC Tampa Bay Rowdies	1 – 0	Montreal Impact	St. Petersburg, Florida, USA
	Tsuyoshi Yoshitake (yellow card) 45'; Takuya Yamada 87'; Mike Ambersley (yellow card) 90'	(report)		Stadium: Progress Energy Park; Attendance: 3,693; Referee: Chris Penso

April 16, 2011	Carolina RailHawks FC	2 – 1	Montreal Impact	Cary, North Carolina, USA
	Etienne Barbara 21'; Pablo Campos 35'	(report)	Kevin Hatchi 11'; Ali Gerba (yellow card) 31'	Stadium: WakeMed Soccer Park; Attendance: 1,219; Referee: Mark Gorak

April 23, 2011	Montreal Impact	0 – 0	FC Tampa Bay Rowdies	Montreal
	Idriss Ech-Chergui (yellow card) 48'; Amir Lowery (yellow card) 58'	(report)	Warren Ukah (yellow card) 16'	Stadium: Saputo Stadium; Attendance: 12,060; Referee: Drew Fischer

May 1, 2011	FC Edmonton	0 – 5	Montreal Impact	Edmonton, Alberta, Canada
	Shaun Saiko (yellow card) 31'; Rein Baart (red card) 84'; Paul Hamilton (yellow card) 90'	(report)	Ali Gerba 9'; António Ribeiro (yellow card) 13'; Anthony Le Gall 31'; Ali Gerba 36'; Anthony Le Gall (yellow card) 74'; Nevio Pizzolitto (yellow card) 85'; Nevio Pizzolitto 86'; Idriss Ech-Chergui 90'	Stadium: Foote Field; Attendance: 2,651; Referee: David Barrie

May 14, 2011	Montreal Impact	1 – 2	Carolina RailHawks FC	Montreal
	Luke Kreamalmeyer (yellow card) 45'; David Testo (yellow card) 54'; Amir Lowery (yellow card) 67'; Anthony Le Gall (yellow card) 80'; Idriss Ech-Chergui 84'	(report)	Etienne Barbara 8'; Etienne Barbara 51'	Stadium: Saputo Stadium; Attendance: 11,907; Referee: Carol Anne Chenard

May 21, 2011	FC Tampa Bay Rowdies	3 – 0	Montreal Impact	St. Petersburg, Florida, USA
	Warren Ukah 40'; Tsuyoshi Yoshitake (yellow card) 56'; Chad Burt (yellow card) 59'; Mike Ambersley 74'; Tsuyoshi Yoshitake 84'	(report)	Nevio Pizzolitto (yellow card) 56'; Leonardo Di Lorenzo (red card) 74'; Zurab Tsiskaridze (yellow card) 76'	Stadium: Progress Energy Park; Attendance: 3,343

May 28, 2011	Fort Lauderdale Strikers	0 – 0	Montreal Impact	Fort Lauderdale, Florida, USA
	Patrick Otte (yellow card) 42'; Jean Philippe Peguero (yellow card) 68'; Lance Laing (yellow card) 88'	(report)	Idriss Ech-Chergui (yellow card) 42'	Stadium: Lockhart Stadium; Attendance: 4,755

June 4, 2011	Montreal Impact	2 – 0	FC Edmonton	Montreal
	Mignane Diouf 34'; Philippe Billy 82'	(report)	Rein Baart (red card) 80'	Stadium: Saputo Stadium; Attendance: 11.232; Referee: John Oliva

June 8, 2011	Atlanta Silverbacks	2 – 1	Montreal Impact	Atlanta, Georgia, USA
	Raphael Cox 13'; Matt Horth 34'; Mario Pérez Zúñiga (yellow card) 49'	(report)	Mignane Diouf 43'; António Ribeiro (yellow card) 61' (yellow-red card) 89'; Leonardo Di Lorenzo (yellow card) 78'; Hassoun Camara (yellow card) 90'; Zurab Tsiskaridze (yellow card) 90'	Stadium: RE/MAX Greater Atlanta Stadium; Attendance: 2,880

June 12, 2011	Puerto Rico Islanders	2 – 1	Montreal Impact	Bayamón, Puerto Rico
	Nicholas Addlery (yellow card) 30'; Aaron Pitchkolan 23'; Nicholas Addlery 37'; Jamie Cunningham (yellow card) 81'; Ray Burse (yellow card) 86'	(report)	Amir Lowery 35'; Zurab Tsiskaridze (yellow card) 45'; David Testo (yellow card) 54'; Kevin Hatchi (yellow card) 70'	Stadium: Juan Ramón Loubriel Stadium; Attendance: 1,761

June 18, 2011	Montreal Impact	0 – 0	Fort Lauderdale Strikers	Montreal
	Zurab Tsiskaridze (yellow card) 15'; Leonardo Di Lorenzo (yellow card) 27'; Simon Gatti (yellow card) 41'	(report)	Abe Thompson (yellow card) 62'; Martyn Lancaster (yellow card) 81'	Stadium: Saputo Stadium; Attendance: 13,034; Referee: Dave Barrie

June 26, 2011	FC Edmonton	1 – 0	Montreal Impact	Edmonton, Alberta, Canada
	Kyle Porter 5'; Antonio Rago (yellow card) 30'; Paul Hamilton (yellow card) 85'	(report)	Amir Lowery (yellow card) 43'; Hassoun Camara (yellow card) 58'; Antonio Ribeiro (yellow card) 90'	Stadium: Foote Field; Attendance: 2,306; Referee: Marco Arruda

June 29, 2011	Montreal Impact	0 – 0	Puerto Rico Islanders	Montreal
	Hassoun Camara (yellow card) 58'; David Testo (yellow card) 60'	(report)	Osei Telesford (yellow card) 43'	Stadium: Saputo Stadium; Attendance: 10,256; Referee: Justin Tasev

July 3, 2011	Carolina RailHawks FC	2 – 0	Montreal Impact	Cary, North Carolina, USA
	Pablo Campos 30'; Nick Zimmerman 34'; Floyd Franks (yellow card) 60'; Stephen Glass (yellow card) 90'; Kupono Low (yellow card) 90'	(report)		Stadium: WakeMed Soccer Park; Attendance: 4,690

July 13, 2011	Montreal Impact	1 – 1	Fort Lauderdale Strikers	Montreal
	Philippe Billy (yellow card) 39'; Hassoun Camara 53'; Wandrille Lefevre (yellow card) 85'	(report)	Eduardo Coudet (yellow card) 22'; Lance Laing 55'; Lance Laing (yellow card) 81'	Stadium: Saputo Stadium; Attendance: 10,581; Referee: John Oliva

July 17, 2011	Montreal Impact	2 – 2	Atlanta Silverbacks	Montreal
	David Testo (yellow card) 29'; Eduardo Sebrango 42'; Luke Kreamalmeyer (yellow card) 68'; Eduardo Sebrango 90'	(report)	Tyler Ruthven (yellow card) 2'; Matt Horth 17'; Matt Horth 64'; Mattias Schnorf (yellow card) 86'; Kohei Matsushita (yellow card) 90'	Stadium: Saputo Stadium; Attendance: 10,077; Referee: David Barrie

July 22, 2011	NSC Minnesota Stars	1 – 0	Montreal Impact	Blaine, Minnesota, USA
	Neil Hlavaty 32'; Simone Bracalello (yellow card) 48'; Kyle Altman (yellow card) 57'	(report)	David Testo (yellow card) 26'; Hassoun Camara (yellow card) 30'; Evan Bush (yellow card) 32'; Ian Westlake (yellow card) 52'; Simon Gatti (yellow card) 71'; Amir Lowery (yellow card) 75'	Stadium: National Sports Center; Attendance: 3,071

July 31, 2011	Montreal Impact	1 – 0	Puerto Rico Islanders	Montreal
	Hassoun Camara (yellow card) 26'; Amir Lowery (yellow card) 37'; Eduardo Sebrango 74'	(report)	Alexis Rivera (yellow card) 44'; Yaikel Perez (red card) 65'	Stadium: Saputo Stadium; Attendance: 12,156; Referee: Carol Anne Chenard

August 6, 2011	Montreal Impact	1 – 3	NSC Minnesota Stars	Montreal
	David Testo (yellow card) 16'; Ian Westlake 22'; Ian Westlake (yellow card) 57'; Nevio Pizzolitto (yellow card) 65'; Simon Gatti (yellow card) 67'	(report)	Chris Clements (yellow card) 4'; Neil Hlavaty 17'; Simone Bracalello 75'; Jack Stewart (yellow card) 82'; Simone Bracalello 90'	Stadium: Saputo Stadium; Attendance: 12,397; Referee: Michel Bourdeau

August 10, 2011	Montreal Impact	3 – 3	FC Tampa Bay	Montreal
	Greg Sutton (yellow card) 16'; Eduardo Sebrango 46'; Ian Westlake 54'; Eduardo Sebrango 75'; Anthony Le Gall (yellow card) 88'	(report)	Keith Savage (yellow card) 15'; Shane Hill 38'; Aaron King 85'; Mozzi Győrio 90'	Stadium: Saputo Stadium; Attendance: 9,860; Referee: Drew Fischer

August 14, 2011	Montreal Impact	4 – 0	Atlanta Silverbacks	Montreal
	Mircea Ilcu 3'; Hassoun Camara 8'; Siniša Ubiparipović 35'; Cameron Knowles (yellow card) 52'; Amir Lowery (yellow card) 55'; Simon Gatti (yellow card) 73'; Mignane Diouf 80'	(report)	Josh Casarona (yellow card) 31'; Patrick Robertson (yellow card) 38'	Stadium: Saputo Stadium; Attendance: 11,136; Referee: Christian Palvicino

August 20, 2011	Montreal Impact	2 – 0	NSC Minnesota Stars	Montreal
	Amir Lowery (yellow card) 35'; Ryan Pore 45'; Luke Kreamalmeyer (yellow card) 75'; Evan Bush (yellow card) 83'; Eduardo Sebrango 83'	(report)		Stadium: Saputo Stadium; Attendance: 12,327; Referee: Mauricio Navarro

August 27, 2011	NSC Minnesota Stars	0 – 2	Montreal Impact	Blaine, Minnesota, USA
	Simone Bracalello (yellow card) 50'; Justin Davis (yellow card) 78'	(report)	Siniša Ubiparipović 6'; Eduardo Sebrango (yellow card) 37'; Siniša Ubiparipović 72'	Stadium: National Sports Center; Attendance: 2,267

September 3, 2011	Fort Lauderdale Strikers	1 - 0	Montreal Impact	Fort Lauderdale, Florida, USA
	Gerson Mayen 71'; Mike Palacio (yellow card) 72'	(report)	Mignane Diouf (yellow card) 90'	Stadium: Lockhart Stadium; Attendance: 2,477; Referee: Donald Dellavia

September 7, 2011	Puerto Rico Islanders	1 - 1	Montreal Impact	Bayamón, Puerto Rico
	Logan Emory (red card) 29'; Jay Needham (yellow card) 87'; Jonathan Fana 90'; Jonathan Fana (yellow card) 90'	[ (report)]	Miguel Montaño (yellow card) 15'; Ian Westlake (yellow card) 17'; Leonardo Di Lorenzo (yellow card) 53'; Ryan Pore 88'; Hassoun Camara (yellow card) 90'; Evan Bush (yellow card) 90'; Nevio Pizzolitto (yellow card) 90'	Stadium: Juan Ramón Loubriel Stadium; Attendance: 1,022; Referee: Javier Santos

September 11, 2011	Montreal Impact	1 - 0	Carolina RailHawks FC	Montreal
	Luke Kreamalmeyer 40'; Simon Gatti (yellow card) 47'; Nevio Pizzolitto (yellow card) 78'	(report)	Tyler Lassiter (yellow card) 21'; John Krause (yellow card) 37'; Brad Knighton (yellow card) 42'; Gareth Evans (yellow card) 78'	Stadium: Saputo Stadium; Attendance: 12,297; Referee: David Barries

September 17, 2011	Montreal Impact	2 - 0	FC Edmonton	Montreal
	Ryan Pore 12'; Philippe Billy (yellow card) 16'; Miguel Montaño (yellow card) 20'; Ryan Pore 78'	(report)	Alex Surprenant (yellow card) 53'; Paul Hamilton (yellow card) 80'	Stadium: Saputo Stadium; Attendance: 12,433; Referee: Justin Tasev

September 24, 2011	Atlanta Silverbacks	0 - 4	Montreal Impact	Atlanta, Georgia, USA
	Tyler Ruthven (yellow card) 54'; Raphael Cox (yellow card) 68'; Jordan Davis (yellow card) 74'	(report)	Ryan Pore 6'; Miguel Montaño 18'; Ryan Pore 30'; Ryan Pore 54'	Stadium: RE/MAX Greater Atlanta Stadium; Attendance: 3,318; Referee: Ted Unkel

=== Canadian Championship ===
April 27, 2011	Montreal Impact	0 - 1	Vancouver Whitecaps FC	Montreal
	Kevin Hatchi (yellow card) 62'	(report)	Terry Dunfield 67'	Stadium: Saputo Stadium; Attendance: 8,412; Referee: Carol Anne Chenard

May 4, 2010	Vancouver Whitecaps FC	1 - 1	Montreal Impact	Vancouver, British Columbia, Canada
	Mouloud Akloul 114'	(report)	Kevin Hatchi (yellow card) 26'; Amir Lowery (yellow card) 30'; Zurab Tsiskaridze (yellow card) 59'; Ali Gerba 84', (yellow card) 101'	Stadium: Empire Field; Attendance: 16.611; Referee: Dave Gantar

=== Regular Season Friendlies ===
May 11, 2011	Montreal Impact	1 - 0	New York Red Bulls	Montreal
	Ali Gerba 37'; Kevin Hatchi (yellow card) 42'	(report)	Sacir Hot (yellow card) 82'	Stadium: Saputo Stadium; Attendance: 12,568; Referee: Geoff Gamble

== 2011 season stats ==
=== Season stats ===
				Total				NASL		Canadian Championship		Playoffs		
N	Pos.	Name	Nat.	GS	App	Gls	Min	App	Gls	App	Gls	App	Gls	Notes
1	GK	Bill Gaudette	(United States)	9	11	-12	762	9	-10	2	-2			(−) means goals conceded
2	DF	Hicham Aâboubou	(Morocco)	7	8		659	8						
3	DF	Cameron Knowles	(New Zealand)	8	8		707	8						
3	DF	Richard Pelletier	(France)	1	1		28	1						No longer with the club
5	DF	Nevio Pizzolitto	(Canada)	14	17	1	1261	15	1	2				
6	MF	Hassoun Camara	(France)	22	22	2	1949	22	2					
7	MF	David Testo	(United States)	13	22		1224	20		2				
8	MF	Luke Kreamalmeyer	(United States)	18	21	1	1505	19	1	2				
10	FW	Ali Gerba	(Canada)	9	14	3	832	12	2	2	1			
11	MF	Leonardo Di Lorenzo	(Argentina)	14	21		1111	19		2				
12	MF	Amir Lowery	(United States)	21	26	1	1788	24	1	2				
14	FW	Mignane Diouf	(Senegal)	14	23	3	1393	23	3					
15	FW	Miguel Montaño	(Colombia)	5	6	1	413	6	1					
16	FW	Eduardo Sebrango	(Cuba)	7	13	6	771	13	6					
17	FW	Anthony Le Gall	(France)	16	24	1	1356	22	1	2				
18	FW	Marco Terminesi	(Canada)		3		64	3						
19	FW	Reda Agourram	(Canada)	4	8		379	8						
21	MF	Philippe Billy	(France)	18	23	1	1668	21	1	2				
22	GK	Evan Bush	(United States)	18	19	-14	1668	19	-14					(−) means goals conceded
23	MF	António Ribeiro	(Canada)	8	16		758	14		2				
24	MF	Simon Gatti	(Canada)	22	23		1953	23						
25	GK	Greg Sutton	(Canada)	1	1	-3	90	1	-3					(−) means goals conceded
27	MF	Ian Westlake	(England)	13	13	2	1125	13	2					
28	MF	Siniša Ubiparipović	(Bosnia and Herzegovina)	8	10	3	745	10	3					
28	FW	Idriss Ech-Chergui	(France)	6	11	2	545	9	2	2				No longer with the club
30	MF	Pierre-Rudolph Mayard	(Canada)	2	9		306	7		2				
32	MF	Ryan Pore	(United States)	10	11	7	780	11	7					
33	FW	Mircea Ilcu	(Romania)	4	11	1	317	11	1					
35	MF	Wandrille Lefevre	(France)		2		33	2						
77	DF	Zourab Tsiskaridze	(Georgia (country))	8	12		793	10		2				No longer with the club
99	DF	Kevin Hatchi	(France)	7	9	1	630	7	1	2				No longer with the club

Last updated: September 10
Source: Competitive matches
Ordered by number
0 shown as blank

=== Points leaders ===
Name	Nationality	Position	Goals	Assists	Points
Ryan Pore	(United States)	MF	7	1	15
Eduardo Sebrango	(Cuba)	FW	6	1	13
Siniša Ubiparipović	(Bosnia and Herzegovina)	MF	3	4	10
Mignane Diouf	(Senegal)	FW	3	3	9
Ali Gerba	(Canada)	FW	2	3	7
Idriss Ech-Chergui	(France)	FW	2	2	6
Hassoun Camara	(France)	MF	2	1	5
Anthony Le Gall	(France)	MF	1	3	5
Ian Westlake	(England)	MF	2	0	4
Miguel Montaño	(Colombia)	FW	1	2	4
Amir Lowery	(United States)	MF	1	2	4
Luke Kreamalmeyer	(United States)	MF	1	1	3
Philippe Billy	(France)	DF	1	1	3
Nevio Pizzolitto	(Canada)	DF	1	1	3
Mircea Ilcu	(Romania)	FW	1	1	3
Simon Gatti	(Canada)	MF	0	2	2
Kevin Hatchi	(France)	DF	1	0	2
Antonio Ribeiro	(Canada)	MF	0	1	1
Leonardo Di Lorenzo	(Argentina)	MF	0	1	1
Zurab Tsiskaridze	(Georgia (country))	DF	0	1	1

=== Disciplinary records ===
Only players with at least one card included.

Number	Position	Name	NASL Regular Season		Canadian Championship		Total	
Number	Position	Name	Booked	Sent off (straight red)	Booked	Sent off (straight red)	Booked	Sent off (straight red)
3	DF	Cameron Knowles	1	0	0	0	1	0
5	DF	Nevio Pizzolitto	5	0	0	0	5	0
6	MF	Hassoun Camara	6	0	0	0	6	0
7	MF	David Testo	6	0	0	0	6	0
8	MF	Luke Kreamalmeyer	3	0	0	0	3	0
10	FW	Ali Gerba	1	0	1	0	2	0
11	MF	Leonardo Di Lorenzo	3	1	0	0	3	1
12	MF	Amir Lowery	7	0	1	0	8	0
14	FW	Mignane Diouf	1	0	0	0	1	0
15	FW	Miguel Montaño	2	0	0	0	2	0
16	FW	Eduardo Sebrango	1	0	0	0	1	0
17	MF	Anthony Le Gall	3	0	0	0	3	0
21	DF	Philippe Billy	2	0	0	0	2	0
22	GK	Evan Bush	3	0	0	0	3	0
23	MF	António Ribeiro	3	1	0	0	3	1
24	MF	Simon Gatti	5	0	0	0	5	0
25	GK	Greg Sutton	1	0	0	0	1	0
27	MF	Ian Westlake	3	0	0	0	3	0
28	FW	Idriss Ech-Chergui	2	0	0	0	2	0
35	MF	Wandrille Lefevre	1	0	0	0	1	0
77	DF	Zurab Tsiskaridze	4	0	1	0	5	0
99	DF	Kevin Hatchi	1	0	2	0	3	0
		TOTALS	64	2	5	0	69	2
