= Orriols =

Orriols is a Spanish surname. Notable people with the surname include:

- Gil Orriols Jansana (born 1977), Spanish footballer and manager
- Marta Orriols (born 1975), Catalan writer
- Sílvia Orriols (born 1984), Catalan politician
- Ramón Orriols (1912–1986), Spanish footballer and manager
