= Simon Gatti =

Canadian soccer player

Personal information
- Full name: Simon Gatti
- Date of birth: February 16, 1981 (age 45)
- Place of birth: Welland, Ontario, Canada
- Height: 5 ft 10 in (1.78 m)
- Position: Defender

Youth career
- 1999: Sochaux
- 2000: Racing Club de Paris

College career
Years	Team	Apps	(Gls)
2002–2006	Rhode Island Rams		

Senior career*
Years	Team	Apps	(Gls)
2002	St. Catharines Wolves		
2004–2005	Rhode Island Stingrays	19	(2)
2006–2011	Montreal Impact	122	(2)
- * Club domestic league appearances and goals as of April 03, 2015

Simon Gatti (born February 16, 1981) is a Canadian former soccer player and current head coach for the Montreal Impact Academy's U-14 team.

He initially began his career in his home region of Niagara with St. Catharines Wolves in the Canadian Professional Soccer League. He made the transition to college soccer by enrolling at the University of Rhode Island, and during the off season he played in the Premier Development League with Rhode Island Stingrays. In 2006, he was drafted by the Montreal Impact of the USL First Division, where during his six seasons with the organization he won a league championship, and a Canadian Championship.

== Career ==
=== College and amateur ===
Gatti, born in Welland, Ontario, is a dual Canadian-French citizen. He was a trialist for Sochaux's U-17 youth team in 1999, and played for French club Racing Club de Paris' youth team in 2000, before returning to North America to attend college. Gatti also won the Ontario Cup twice with the Thorold Cobras in 1998 and 1999 and placed second at the national championships with the Cobras in 1999.

Gatti played college soccer with University of Rhode Island from 2002 to 2005, leading the team as co-captain from 2003 to 2005 while majoring in kinesiology. In total he played 85 games, tallied 10 goals, eight assists and 28 points. As a freshman, the midfielder was chosen for the Atlantic 10 Conference All-Rookie Team. He was proclaimed team MVP in 2005 and selected to the First Team All-Conference, and First Team All New England, helping the Rams win the Atlantic 10 Division Championship again (2002, 2005). As a sophomore, he was a Second Team All-Atlantic 10 Conference and Third Team All-New England.

During the summers of 2004 and 2005, he also played in the USL Premier Development League with the Rhode Island Stingrays, playing 19 games, scoring two goals and picking up one assist. He had a brief stint with the St. Catharines Wolves of the Canadian Professional Soccer League in 2002, but wasn't allowed to re-sign with the club for the 2003 season due to risking his scholarship.

=== Professional ===
Gatti joined the Montreal Impact as their first pick during the 2006 USL First Division college draft, chosen 12th overall. He played his first game with the Impact on May 21, coming onto the field for Antonio Ribeiro at the 82nd minute of play. He earned his first start against the Toronto Lynx on September 8. That year, he helped Montreal win the regular-season title as well as the Voyageurs Cup.

During his second season with the Impact, he was one of 13 players in the USL to play all 28 games. His versatility and steadfastness was in evidence as the longtime midfielder played right fullback in 22 out of 28 games, helping the Impact to register the second-best defense in 2007, with 14 shutouts and only 21 goals in 28 games. He quickly surpassed his 2006 minutes played (157 minutes), playing a total of 2,046 minutes. His first career point came on June 29, with an assist to Antonio Ribeiro's game-winning goal in a 1-0 win over the Puerto Rico Islanders. He was named to the USL D1 Team of the Week for week 14 and received the Unsung Hero Award/Quatrième étoile de l’Impact at the end of the season.

In his third season, he exceeded his previous record by playing 2,068 minutes, the second highest on the team. He started 24 of 27 games played, and helped the Impact advance in the CONCACAF Champions League with 8 games played (7 game starts). During his fourth season (2009), Gatti started 18 of 21 games played, racking up 1,463 minutes, and helping the Impact to win the USL Championship. During his fifth season, Gatti was sidelined with a hernia and started 11 of 18 games played.

Gatti's sixth and final season with the Montreal Impact (2011) was his finest. He led the team both with 22 game starts in 23 games, and with 1,953 minutes. He reached his 100th career game start and received the Unsung Hero Award/Quatrième étoile de l’Impact for the second time in his career. His final statistics with the Montreal Impact include 122 games played, 100 game starts and 8,656 minutes played.

Gatti announced his retirement in February 2012 and was subsequently hired by the Montreal Impact Academy to coach the U-14 team as part of the Montreal Impact Sport-Études program.

== Honors ==
=== Montreal Impact ===
- USL First Division Championship (1): 2009

== Career stats ==
Team	Season	League	Domestic League			Domestic Playoffs			Domestic Cup^{1}			Concacaf Competition^{2}			Total		
Team	Season	League	Apps	Goals	Assists	Apps	Goals	Assists	Apps	Goals	Assists	Apps	Goals	Assists	Apps	Goals	Assists
Rhode Island Stingrays	2004	PDL	13	2	0	-	-	-	-	-	-	-	-	-	14	2	0
Rhode Island Stingrays	2005	PDL	6	0	1	-	-	-	-	-	-	-	-	-	6	0	1
Montreal Impact	2006	USL-1	5	0	0	1	0	0	-	-	-	-	-	-	6	0	0
Montreal Impact	2007	USL-1	28	0	1	2	0	0	-	-	-	-	-	-	28	0	1
Montreal Impact	2008	USL-1	27	0	1	4	0	0	4	0	0	8	0	0	39	0	1
Montreal Impact	2009	USL-1	21	1	1	2	0	0	4	0	0	-	-	-	27	1	1
Montreal Impact	2010	USL-1	18	1	1	-	-	-	1	0	0	-	-	-	19	1	1
Montreal Impact	2011	NASL	22	0	1	-	-	-	-	-	-	-	-	-	22	0	1
		Total PDL	19	2	1	-	-	-	-	-	-	-	-	-	19	2	1
		Total USSF D2	122	2	5	9	0	0	9	0	0	8	0	0	148	2	5
