= Leonardo Di Lorenzo =

Argentine footballer (born 1981)

Personal information
- Full name: Leonardo Di Lorenzo
- Date of birth: May 20, 1981 (age 45)
- Place of birth: Buenos Aires, Argentina
- Height: 5 ft 8 in (1.73 m)
- Position: Attacking midfielder

Youth career
- 1997–1999: San Lorenzo

Senior career*
| Years | Team | Apps | (Gls) |
| 2000–2004 | San Lorenzo | 29 | (1) |
| 2003 | → Atlético Rafaela (loan) | 37 | (2) |
| 2005 | Argentinos Juniors | 1 | (0) |
| 2006–2011 | Montreal Impact | 139 | (10) |
| 2006 | → Ottawa Fury (loan) | 6 | (1) |
| 2012 | Deportes Concepción | 18 | (3) |
| 2012–2013 | Universidad de Concepción | 13 | (1) |
| 2013 | Acassuso | 19 | (0) |
| 2013–2020 | Temperley | 171 | (7) |
- * Club domestic league appearances and goals

Leonardo Di Lorenzo (born May 20, 1981) is a retired Argentine footballer. He announced his retirement from football at the age of 39 on January 20, 2021.

== Career ==
=== South America ===
Di Lorenzo started playing soccer in the professional ranks in 2000, with San Lorenzo, where he was part of the team that reached the National A Division closing tournament, and helped the club achieve its first international success by winning the Mercosur Cup. Later on he had spells with Atlético Rafaela and Argentinos Juniors.

=== Canada ===
Di Lorenzo was spotted by the Montreal Impact head coach Nick De Santis during a scouting trip in Argentina in January 2006, and signed a two-year contract with the USL First Division club. In his first season with the Impact he played in 19 games and spent 1,427 minutes on the field in regular-season action, making him the busiest Impact player among those into their first USL First Division season, and scored two goals and collected six assists for 10 points making him the second highest total among Impact players after Mauricio Salles. Helped the Impact claim the regular-season title as well as the Voyageurs Cup, and he won the Impact's Newcomer of the Year award.

In his second season Di Lorenzo was one of the 13 players in the league who played all 28 regular-season games. He ended the season with three goals and four assists for 10 points, and earned a spot in the 2007 USL First Division Second All-league Team for a second straight season. He was also named five times to the USL First Division Team of the Week. At the team's annual awards banquet he was awarded the Giuseppe-Saputo Trophy as the Impact's MVP. Impact's head coach, De Santis said of him "Leonardo came to training camp in perfect shape and it gave him the chance to be constant all season long. He was a key player during 28 games. After only two seasons, he is already part of the team's nucleus". During the 2008 USL season Di Lorenzo played in 24 matches for the Impact, and recorded three goals as well two assists. In the 2008 Canadian Championship he appeared in all four matches for the Impact. He helped the Impact qualify for the first time for the CONCACAF Champions League by winning the Canadian Championship. He was also selected to the USL First Division Second All-Star Team for a third consecutive season. During the 2009 USL season Di Lorenzo contributed by helping the Impact clinch a playoff spot under new head coach Marc Dos Santos. He helped the Impact reach the finals where Montreal would face the Vancouver Whitecaps FC, this marking the first time in USL history where the final match would consist of two Canadian clubs. In the final he helped the Impact win the series 6–3 on aggregate. The victory gave the Impact their third USL Championship and also the victory marked his first USL Championship.

Di Lorenzo signed a new two-year contract with Montreal on January 30, 2010. On July 18, 2010, he made his 100-game appearance for the club; he managed to score his 10th career goal in the same match against Crystal Palace Baltimore. Throughout the season he led his team in assists, and managed to become one of the five Montreal players to record 2,000 minutes.

== Career stats ==
| Team | Season | League | Domestic League | | | Domestic Playoffs | | | Domestic Cup^{1} | | | Concacaf Competition^{2} | | | Total | | |
| Team | Season | League | Apps | Goals | Assists | Apps | Goals | Assists | Apps | Goals | Assists | Apps | Goals | Assists | Apps | Goals | Assists |
|---|---|---|---|---|---|---|---|---|---|---|---|---|---|---|---|---|---|
| Montreal Impact | 2006 | USL-1 | 19 | 2 | 6 | 2 | 0 | 0 | - | - | - | - | - | - | 21 | 2 | 6 |
| Montreal Impact | 2007 | USL-1 | 28 | 3 | 4 | 2 | 0 | 0 | - | - | - | - | - | - | 30 | 3 | 4 |
| Montreal Impact | 2008 | USL-1 | 24 | 3 | 2 | 2 | 0 | 0 | 4 | 0 | 0 | 10 | 0 | 0 | 40 | 3 | 2 |
| Montreal Impact | 2009 | USL-1 | 23 | 1 | 3 | 6 | 0 | 1 | 2 | 0 | 0 | - | - | - | 31 | 1 | 4 |
| Montreal Impact | 2010 | USSF D2 | 26 | 1 | 7 | 4 | 1 | 1 | 4 | 0 | 0 | - | - | - | 34 | 2 | 8 |
| Montreal Impact | 2011 | NASL | 19 | 0 | 1 | - | - | - | 2 | 0 | 0 | - | - | - | 21 | 0 | 1 |
| | | Total NASL | 139 | 10 | 23 | 16 | 1 | 2 | 12 | 0 | 0 | 10 | 0 | 0 | 177 | 11 | 25 |

== Honours ==
San Lorenzo

- Argentine Primera División (1): 2001 Clausura
- Copa Mercosur (1): 2001
- Copa Sudamericana (1): 2002

Montreal Impact

- USL First Division Championship (1): 2009
