= Zurab Tsiskaridze =

Georgian footballer (born 1986)

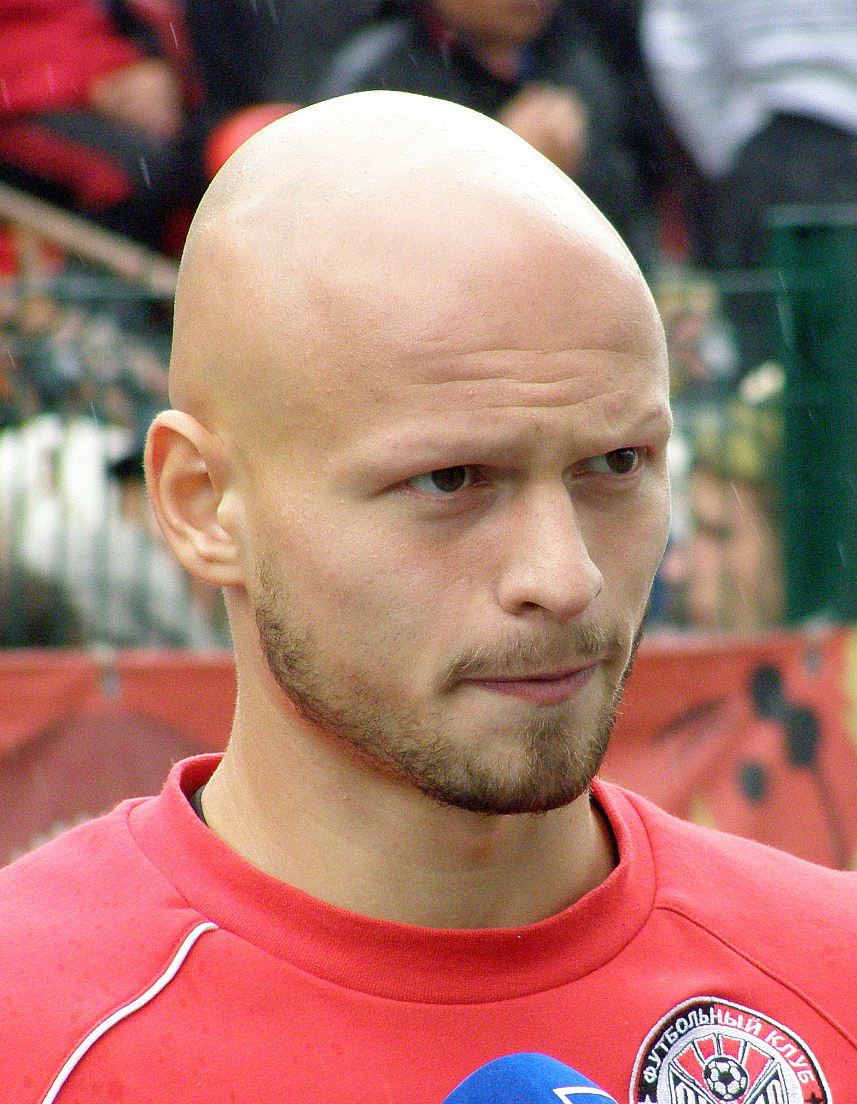
- Tsiskaridze with Amkar Perm in 2011

Personal information
- Full name: Zurab Tsiskaridze Jr.
- Date of birth: 8 September 1986 (age 40)
- Place of birth: Tbilisi, Georgian SSR
- Height: 6 ft 1 in (1.85 m)
- Position: Centre-back

Youth career
- Agrykola Warszawa
- 2000–2003: Legia Warsaw
- 2004: Inter de Limeira
- 2005–2006: Barueri
- 2007–2008: Sète 34

Senior career*
Years	Team	Apps	(Gls)
2008	Sète 34	7	(0)
2009	Miami FC	17	(1)
2010	Vancouver Whitecaps	27	(0)
2011	Montreal Impact	10	(0)
2011–2012	Amkar Perm	3	(0)
2012–2014	Jönköpings Södra	31	(1)
2014–2015	Bangkok Glass	4	(0)
2015	San Antonio Scorpions	17	(1)
2016–2017	FK Teplice	11	(0)
2017–2019	Eskilstuna	48	(1)
2019	Al-Hazem	13	(1)
2019–2020	Al-Jabalain	21	(1)
2020	RoPS	15	(1)
2021	Vasalund	12	(1)
2022–2023	Åtvidaberg	3	(0)
2023	Husqvarna FF		

International career
2016	Georgia	2	(0)
- * Club domestic league appearances and goals

Zurab Tsiskaridze (Georgian: ზურაბ ცისკარიძე; born 8 September 1986) is a Georgian former professional footballer who played as a centre-back.

== Early life ==
Tsiskaridze was born in the Georgian SSR prior to the breakup of the Soviet Union in 1991. During early childhood, he moved to Poland where he lived for 10 years in the city of Warsaw with his family. Later on he moved around the globe pursuing his professional career.

== Career ==
=== Youth ===
He began his career 2004 in Brazil with the U-20 team with Limeira based club Associação Atlética Internacional and played then the first six months in 2005 with the U-20 side of Grêmio Recreativo Barueri. He earned himself a tryout with D.C. United before his senior year of high school, but was not offered a contract by the team, who advised him to play college soccer. Instead, Tsiskaridze left school to pursue a professional soccer career, travelling to Brazil and France, among other countries.

=== Professional ===
Tsiskaridze spent time with the Kansas City Wizards reserves in 2007, but when offered the minimum salary contract, he decided to pursue his dream of playing in Europe. He spent eighteen months with the reserve and first team of FC Sète, and in 2008 played seven games in the French third division Championnat National.

Tsiskaridze was signed by USL First Division side Miami FC in April 2009, after impressing Zinho and the coaching staff during an open tryout. Tsiskaridze had traveled all the way from France for the event. He played 18 games and scored one goal for Miami in his first season in the league. On 2 December 2009, he signed a one-year contract with Vancouver Whitecaps.

On 19 October 2010, the Vancouver Whitecaps released Tsiskaridze, along with five fellow players, citing their need to purge certain players in preparation for their upcoming promotion to Major League Soccer.

On 17 February 2011, he signed a new contract with Montreal Impact for the last season of the club in NASL, before the entry of the Impact in the MLS in 2012. After spending a season in the Russian Premier League he signed a short-term contract with Swedish Superettan club Jönköpings Södra IF in the summer of 2012. At the end of the season he extended his contract for one more year.

== Personal life ==
He speaks 7 languages, and ironically, Georgian isn't one of them, as he barely speaks it. He speaks Russian, which he learnt from his stepdad; Polish; English; Portuguese; Spanish; Czech; and French.

His mother was a ballerina, while his father was an opera singer. He is relatives with the ballet dancer Nikolay Tsiskaridze.

During the perestroika, he moved to Poland with his mum and stepdad, while his biological father moved to the United States. Later, he moved to live with his biological father, and graduated school in American.

== Career stats ==
Team	Season	League	Domestic League			Domestic Playoffs			Domestic Cup^{1}			Concacaf Competition^{2}			Total		
Team	Season	League	Apps	Goals	Assists	Apps	Goals	Assists	Apps	Goals	Assists	Apps	Goals	Assists	Apps	Goals	Assists
Miami FC	2009	USL-1	18	1	0	-	-	-	-	-	-	-	-	-	18	1	0
Vancouver Whitecaps	2010	USSF D2	26	0	1	1	0	0	4	0	0	-	-	-	31	0	1
Montreal Impact	2011	NASL	10	0	1	-	-	-	2	0	0	-	-	-	12	0	1
		Total NASL	54	1	2	1	0	0	6	0	0	–	–	–	57	1	2
