= Nevio Pizzolitto =

Canadian soccer player

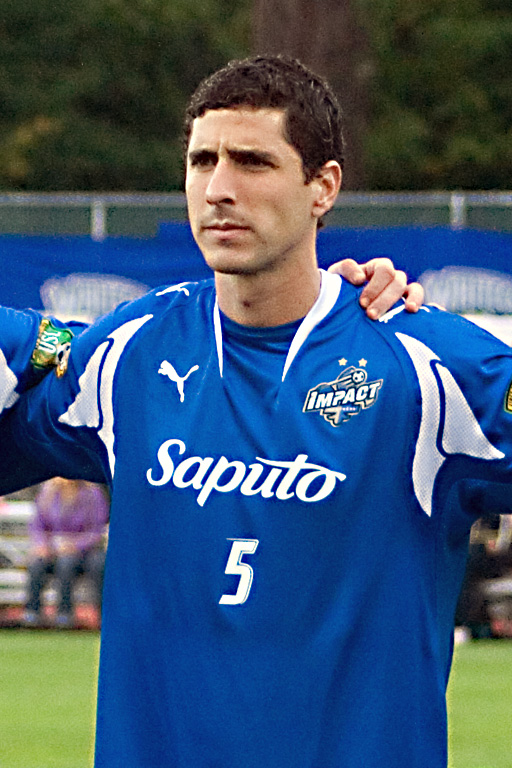

Personal information
- Full name: Nevio Pizzolitto
- Date of birth: August 26, 1976 (age 50)
- Place of birth: Montreal, Quebec, Canada
- Height: 6 ft 2 in (1.88 m)
- Position: Defender

Youth career
- 1990–1994: Sporting-Patriotes

Senior career*
Years	Team	Apps	(Gls)
1995–1997	Montreal Impact	59	(0)
1997–1998	US Imperia	6	(0)
1999	Richmond Kickers	21	(0)
2000–2011	Montreal Impact	222	(11)

International career^{‡}
1993	Canada U-17	3	(0)
1999–2004	Canada	8	(0)
- * Club domestic league appearances and goals as of May 21, 2011 ‡ National team caps and goals as of October 18, 2010

Nevio Pizzolitto (born August 26, 1976) is a Canadian soccer player who most recently played for Montreal Impact in the North American Soccer League.

== Career ==
=== Youth ===
Pizzolitto began playing youth soccer with the Sporting-Patriotes of the Quebec Elite Soccer League in 1990. He was picked several times on the LSEQ all-star teams, was also proclaimed Defender of the Year. He helped helping Sporting-Patriotes reach the national club championship in the U15 category in 1990, and later went on to win the national title at the U19 level in 1994.

=== Professional ===
Pizzolitto signed with Montreal Impact in the summer of 1995, becoming an important key to Montreal's defence. Where he has helped the Impact win the league championship in 2004, as well as the regular-season title from 1995 to 1997, and 2005 to 2006. As well as claiming the Voyageurs Cup six years in row. In 2005, he helped the Impact to a 15-game undefeated streak which marked a new league record. He was picked on the second All-League team from 2004 to 2006, and was named the Impact's Defensive Player of the Year in 2005.

Early in his career he had a short spell in Italy, with Serie D side Imperia.

On July 16, 2006, he played his 200th career game with the Montreal club, becoming the third player in club history to reach that mark after Nick De Santis and Mauro Biello. On July 26, 2006, he climbed to third place in club history for career minutes played with the Impact, surpassing Patrick Diotte. He helped Montreal come up with 10 shutouts at home, tying a club record, and allow only four goals at home, marking a new club record in 2006.

On December 2, 2008, the Montreal Impact announced the re-signing of central defenders Pizzolitto and Stefano Pesoli to a two-year contract. During the 2009 season he helped the Impact maintain the second best defense in the league, by only allowing in 28 goals in 30 games. On June 28, 2008, he reached a milestone with the club by playing his 220th career match, surpassing Nick De Santis for second spot in club history. In the Nutrilite Canadian Championship, he helped win the 2008 Nutrilite Canadian Championship for the Impact which meant the club qualified to the inaugural CONCACAF Champions League. During the Impact tenure in the Champions League, Pizzolitto played a dominant role in the defence for the Impact throughout the tournament. In total he appeared in nine out of ten matches and helped the Impact reach the quarterfinals before losing out to Santos Laguna to 5–4 on aggregate. He was selected to the USL First Division First All-League team for the first time in his career, and was awarded by Montreal the Defensive Player of the Year award for the second time in his career.

During the 2009 USL season Pizzolitto contributed by helping the Impact clinch a playoff spot under new head coach Marc Dos Santos. He recorded his first playoff goal in the quarterfinal match against Charleston Battery. The match resulted in 2–1 victory for the Impact, and allowed the Impact to advance to the finals by winning their second match on aggregate. Montreal would advance on to the finals where their opponents would end up being the Vancouver Whitecaps, thus marking the first time in USL history where the final match would consist of two Canadian clubs. In the final Pizzolitto helped the Impact win the series 6–3 on aggregate. The victory gave the Impact their third USL Championship and also the victory marked Pizzolitto's second USL Championship. On October 6, 2009, he received the Defensive Player of the Year award, winning the award for a consecutive year. On January 25, 2010, the Montreal Impact announced the appointment of Pizzolitto as the successor to Mauro Biello as the new team captain. He played his 200th league game for Impact on June 9, 2010, against NSC Minnesota Stars.

Pizzolitto failed to earn a spot on the roster when Montreal Impact joined Major League Soccer in 2012. He was released by Montreal on February 20, 2012.

=== International ===
Pizzolitto played at the 1993 FIFA U-17 World Championship in Japan, in a team alongside Paul Stalteri and Jason Bent.

He made his senior debut for the Canada national soccer team on October 10, 1999, against Haiti, in a Gold Cup qualifier. He made the 23 man roster for the 2003 CONCACAF Gold Cup and played all three games. He has represented Canada in 1 FIFA World Cup qualification match. He also played in international friendlies against Germany and Barbados in 2003 and 2004.

== Honors ==
=== Montreal Impact ===
- USL First Division Championship (2): 2004, 2009
- USL First Division Commissioners Cup (5): 1995, 1996, 1997, 2005, 2006
- Voyageurs Cup Champions (7): 2002, 2003, 2004, 2005, 2006, 2007, 2008

== Career stats ==
Team	Season	League	Domestic League			Domestic Playoffs			Domestic Cup^{1}			Concacaf Competition^{2}			Total		
Team	Season	League	Apps	Goals	Assists	Apps	Goals	Assists	Apps	Goals	Assists	Apps	Goals	Assists	Apps	Goals	Assists
Montreal Impact	1995	A-League	8	0	0	1	0	0	-	-	-	-	-	-	9	0	0
Montreal Impact	1996	A-League	5	0	0	1	0	1	-	-	-	-	-	-	6	0	1
Montreal Impact	1997	A-League	22	0	1	5	0	0	-	-	-	-	-	-	27	0	1
Montreal Impact	1998	A-League	24	0	0	3	0	1	-	-	-	-	-	-	27	0	1
Richmond Kickers	1999	A-League	21	0	1	1	0	0	-	-	-	-	-	-	22	0	1
Montreal Impact	2000	A-League	23	2	0	-	-	-	-	-	-	-	-	-	23	2	0
Montreal Impact	2001	A-League	12	0	0	-	-	-	-	-	-	-	-	-	12	0	0
Montreal Impact	2002	A-League	26	1	0	4	0	0	-	-	-	-	-	-	30	1	0
Montreal Impact	2003	A-League	24	1	1	2	0	0	-	-	-	-	-	-	26	1	1
Montreal Impact	2004	A-League	18	1	0	4	0	1	-	-	-	-	-	-	22	1	1
Montreal Impact	2005	USL-1	24	1	2	2	0	0	-	-	-	-	-	-	26	1	2
Montreal Impact	2006	USL-1	22	2	1	1	0	0	-	-	-	-	-	-	23	2	1
Montreal Impact	2007	USL-1	4	0	0	-	-	-	-	-	-	-	-	-	4	0	0
Montreal Impact	2008	USL-1	18	0	0	3	0	0	3	0	0	9	0	0	33	0	0
Montreal Impact	2009	USL-1	22	1	0	6	1	0	2	0	0	-	-	-	30	2	0
Montreal Impact	2010	USSF D2	24	1	0	4	0	0	3	0	0	-	-	-	30	1	0
Montreal Impact	2011	NASL	15	1	0	-	-	-	2	0	0	-	-	-	7	1	0
Career Total		-	312	11	6	37	1	3	10	0	0	9	0	0	369	12	9

Last updated: October 18, 2010

1) Lamar Hunt U.S. Open Cup (American Based Clubs) - Nutrilite Canadian Cup (Canadian Based Clubs)
2) Concacaf Champions League
