= Ali Gerba =

Cameroonian-born Canadian soccer player

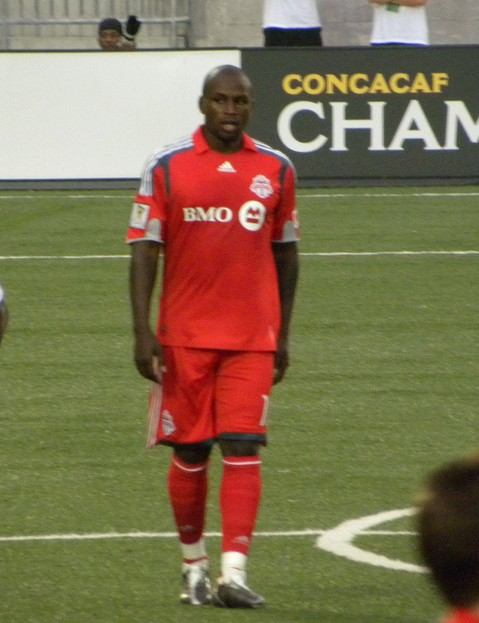
- Gerba with Toronto FC in 2009

Personal information
- Full name: Ali Ngon Gerba
- Date of birth: September 4, 1981 (age 45)
- Place of birth: Yaoundé, Cameroon
- Height: 6 ft 0 in (1.83 m)
- Position: Forward

Youth career
- 1994–1997: Bourassa

Senior career*
Years	Team	Apps	(Gls)
2000	Montreal Impact	17	(7)
2001	Miami Fusion	0	(0)
2002	Toronto Lynx	4	(0)
2002	Pittsburgh Riverhounds	7	(1)
2003–2004	Montreal Impact	7	(0)
2004–2005	Toronto Lynx	53	(24)
2005	Montreal Impact	8	(4)
2005	GIF Sundsvall	11	(5)
2006–2007	IFK Gothenburg	6	(0)
2006	→ Odd Grenland (loan)	10	(1)
2007	→ AC Horsens (loan)	15	(4)
2008	FC Ingolstadt 04	15	(4)
2008–2009	Milton Keynes Dons	24	(10)
2009–2010	Toronto FC	11	(1)
2010–2011	Montreal Impact	25	(11)
Total		213	(72)

International career
1999–2001	Canada U20	6	(0)
2005–2011	Canada	31	(15)
- * Club domestic league appearances and goals

Ali Ngon Gerba (/ˈʒɛərbɑː/; born September 4, 1981) is a former professional soccer player who played as a forward. Born in Cameroon, he represented the Canada national team.

== Early life ==
Gerba was born on September 4, 1981, in Yaoundé, Cameroon. He is the son of Malam and Amina. He moved to Canada at the age of nine.

== Club career ==
=== Canada and United States ===
In 1999, Gerba trialed for Spanish La Liga side Valencia. In 2000 Gerba signed with the Montreal Impact, then of the A-League, where he recorded six goals and two assists, a club record for a rookie. In 2001 Gerba attempted a move up to Major League Soccer by signing with the Miami Fusion, but without success. In 2002 Gerba returned to the A-League when he signed with the Pittsburgh Riverhounds. Late in the season he was traded to the Toronto Lynx. In 2003, Gerba was the leading scorer for the Lynx with six goals when he was traded to the Impact late in the season. Gerba returned to the Lynx in 2004. During an outstanding season, he scored 15 goals, a club record. Gerba started for the Lynx in 2005, scoring two goals, before returning to the Impact in exchange for Abraham Francois and Sita-Taty Matondo. Gerba left the Lynx as the club's second highest all-time scorer with 24 goals in total. With the Impact Gerba played an important role in helping the team stay undefeated in 15 games, a league record. As a result, Gerba was capped by Canada in the Gold Cup where he played three games and scored one goal.

=== Europe ===
After the Gold Cup Gerba joined Swedish club GIF Sundsvall of the Allsvenskan and scored 6 goals in 11 games. When the team was relegated to the Superettan, Gerba moved to Swedish club IFK Gothenburg on a three-year deal. In 2006, he was loaned to Odd Grenland in Norway, and in 2007 he went on loan again to Danish Superliga side AC Horsens before joining German club FC Ingolstadt 04 in January 2008. In June 2008, he was released from his contract with the club.

As of June 28, 2008, Gerba was being linked with a return to North America to join Canadian manager Frank Yallop at Major League Soccer club San Jose Earthquakes. However, on August 7, 2008, he signed for Football League One newcomers Milton Keynes Dons. On August 20, 2008, he made his first appearance for the Dons in a 3–0 away victory against Colchester United and scored his first goal in his second game, a 2–1 defeat to Peterborough United. The club announced they would not be offering Gerba a new contract for the 2009–10 season.

=== Return to Canada ===
Gerba was linked with moves to MLS with Toronto FC, a return to his hometown Montreal Impact and also with English sides, Millwall, Stockport County, Oldham Athletic, Brentford and Burton Albion. Toronto FC announced the signing of Gerba on its website on June 23, 2009. Gerba made his unofficial debut for Toronto FC in an international friendly against the Argentinean powerhouse Club Atlético River Plate, at BMO Field on July 22, 2009. Gerba scored on his MLS debut vs. Columbus Crew on July 25, 2009, in a 3–2 loss.

On July 15, 2010. Gerba joined the Montreal Impact for his 4th stint with the team during which he set the club record for fastest goal in club history (18 seconds into the game) and scored the club's first regular season hat-trick.

At the end of the 2011 NASL season, head coach Jesse Marsch and sporting director Nick De Santis evaluated the Impact squad in preparation for the team's move to Major League Soccer, and Gerba was cut on October 12, 2011.

== International career ==
Gerba made his debut for Canada in a July 2005 friendly match against Honduras. By December 2009, he had the country's most prolific strike-rate, with 15 goals in 28 full internationals.

Gerba has represented Canada in three CONCACAF Gold Cups and 2010 FIFA World Cup qualification. He is the all-time leader in goals for Canada at the Gold Cup with six.

== Career statistics ==
=== Club ===
Appearances and goals by club, season and competition
Club	Season	League			League play-offs		National Cup		Continental		Total	
Club	Season	Division	Apps	Goals	Apps	Goals	Apps	Goals	Apps	Goals	Apps	Goals
Montreal Impact	2000	USL-1	17	7							17	7
Miami Fusion	2001	MLS	0	0							0	0
Toronto Lynx	2002	USL-1	4	0							4	0
Pittsburgh Riverhounds	2002	USL-1	7	1							7	1
Montreal Impact	2003	USL-1	7	0							7	0
Toronto Lynx	2003	USL-1	21	7							21	7
Toronto Lynx	2004	USL-1	25	15							25	15
Toronto Lynx	2005	USL-1	7	2							7	2
Toronto Lynx	Total		53	24							53	24
Montreal Impact	2005	USL-1	8	4							8	4
GIF Sundsvall	2005	Allsvenskan	11	5							11	5
IFK Göteborg	2006	Allsvenskan	5	0							5	0
IFK Göteborg	2007	Allsvenskan	1	0							1	0
IFK Göteborg	Total		6	0							6	0
Odd Grenland (loan)	2006	Eliteserien	10	1							10	1
AC Horsens (loan)	2006–07	Danish Superliga	15	4							15	4
FC Ingolstadt 04	2007–08	Regionalliga Süd	15	4	0	0	–		–		15	4
Milton Keynes Dons	2008–09	Football League One	24	10	1	0	0	0	–		25	10
Toronto FC	2009	MLS	11	1					2	0	13	1
Montreal Impact	2010	USSF D2	13	9	4	4					17	13
Montreal Impact	2011	NASL	12	2			2	1			14	3
Montreal Impact	Total		25	11	4	4	2	1			31	16
Career total			213	72	5	4	2	1	2	0	222	77

=== International ===
Scores and results list Canada's goal tally first, score column indicates score after each Gerba goal.

List of international goals scored by Ali Gerba
No.	Date	Venue	Opponent	Score	Result	Competition
1	July 12, 2005	Foxboro, U.S.	Cuba		2–1	2005 CONCACAF Gold Cup
2	June 1, 2007	Maracaibo, Venezuela	Venezuela		2–2	Friendly
3	June 9, 2007	Miami, U.S.	Guadeloupe		1–2	2007 CONCACAF Gold Cup
4	June 16, 2007	Foxboro, U.S.	Guatemala		3–0	2007 CONCACAF Gold Cup
5	June 16, 2007	Foxboro, U.S.	Guatemala		3–0	2007 CONCACAF Gold Cup
6	June 15, 2008	Kingstown, Saint Vincent and the Grenadines	Saint Vincent and the Grenadines		3–0	2010 World Cup Qualification
7	June 15, 2008	Kingstown, Saint Vincent and the Grenadines	Saint Vincent and the Grenadines		3–0	2010 World Cup Qualification
8	June 20, 2008	Montreal, Canada	Saint Vincent and the Grenadines		4–1	2010 World Cup Qualification
9	June 20, 2008	Montreal, Canada	Saint Vincent and the Grenadines		4–1	2010 World Cup Qualification
10	September 10, 2008	Tuxtla Gutierrez, Mexico	Mexico		1–2	2010 World Cup Qualification
11	October 15, 2008	Edmonton, Canada	Mexico		2–2	2010 World Cup Qualification
12	June 30, 2009	Oxnard, U.S.	Guatemala		3–0	Friendly
13	June 30, 2009	Oxnard, U.S.	Guatemala		3–0	Friendly
14	July 3, 2009	Carson, U.S.	Jamaica		1–0	2009 CONCACAF Gold Cup
15	July 7, 2009	Columbus, U.S.	El Salvador		1–0	2009 CONCACAF Gold Cup

== Honours ==
Individual

- USSF D-2 Pro League Best XI: 2010
