= Idriss Ech-Chergui =

French football player (born 1985)

Personal information
- Full name: Idriss Ech-Chergui
- Date of birth: 22 May 1985 (age 41)
- Place of birth: Saint-Chamond, Loire, France
- Height: 1.73 m (5 ft 8 in)
- Position: Attacking midfielder

Team information
- Current team: Hyères
- Number: 28

Youth career
- 2000–2005: Saint-Étienne

Senior career*
Years	Team	Apps	(Gls)
2005–2006	Saint-Étienne	0	(0)
2006	→ Bayonne (loan)	13	(0)
2006–2007	Sète	34	(12)
2007–2009	Nîmes	51	(9)
2010	JS Kabylie	12	(1)
2011	Montreal Impact	9	(2)
2012	Martigues	19	(3)
2012–2014	Luzenac	62	(15)
2014–2018	Paris FC II	7	(3)
2014–2018	Paris FC	86	(16)
2018–2021	Toulon	41	(1)
2021–	Hyères	0	(0)
- * Club domestic league appearances and goals as of 16:58, 4 May 2022 (UTC)

Idriss Ech-Chergui (born 22 May 1985) is a French professional footballer who plays as an attacking midfielder for Championnat National 1 club Hyères.

== Career ==
=== Early career ===
Born in Saint-Chamond, Loire, Ech-Chergui came up through the junior ranks at Saint-Étienne but failed to land a professional contract with the club after a horrific injury. He later played for Bayonne, Sète and Nîmes.

=== JS Kabylie ===
On 7 October 2009, Ech-Chergui was linked with a move to Algerian side JS Kabylie, and five days later he started his trial with the club. On 22 October 2009 he returned to the club to finalize the details of his contract.

On 22 July 2010, Ech-Chergui was released from the club for indiscipline.

=== Montreal Impact ===
On 10 February 2011, Ech-Chergui signed a one-year deal with the Montreal Impact. After the one-year deal expired, he left Montreal, and he returned to France.

=== Martigues ===
On 6 January 2012, he signed for Championnat National club Martigues following a short trial period.
