= Mircea Ilcu =

Romanian-Canadian soccer player

Personal information
- Full name: Mircea Ilcu
- Date of birth: 1 April 1991 (age 35)
- Place of birth: Timișoara, Romania
- Height: 1.71 m (5 ft 7 1/2 in)
- Position: Forward

Youth career
- John Abbott Islanders
- 2007–2008: Lakers du Lac Saint-Louis
- 2009: Trois-Rivières Attak
- 2010–2012: Montreal Impact

College career
Years	Team	Apps	(Gls)
2013–	Montreal Carabins		

Senior career*
Years	Team	Apps	(Gls)
2009	Trois-Rivières Attak	10	(4)
2010	Montreal Impact Academy	10	(3)
2011	Montreal Impact (NASL)	11	(1)
2012–2013	Montreal Impact (MLS)	0	(0)

International career
2006	Canada U15		
2006–2007	Canada U17		
- * Club domestic league appearances and goals as of 14 August 2011

Mircea Ilcu (born 1 April 1991 in Timișoara) is a soccer player. Born in Romania, he represented Canada at youth international level.

== Club career ==
=== Youth career ===
Ilcu moved from Romania to Canada with his family as a small child, settling in Vaudreuil-Dorion, Quebec. He attended Ecole Secondaire de la Cité-des-Jeunes and played college soccer at John Abbott College. He played for Équipe du Québec (the Quebec provincial team) between 2004 and 2006. He would also play for the Quebec team at the 2009 Canada Games where he recorded a goal in the finals to win the gold medal.

=== Early career ===
Ilcu played in the local amateur circuit the Ligue de soccer élite du Québec in 2004 with Lakers du Lac Saint-Louis. In the 2007 season, he received the best player and top goal scorer award in the U17 division.

After four seasons with Saint-Louis, he signed with the Trois-Rivières Attak in the Canadian Soccer League. In his debut season in the inter-provincial league, he helped the club secure their second divisional title. Trois-Rivières' opponents in the first round of the playoffs were Portugal FC where they successfully defeated the Toronto-based team. Ultimately, the Attak would reach the championship finals where they defeated the reigning champions the Serbian White Eagles in a penalty shootout. Throughout the 2009 season, he made 10 appearances and recorded 4 goals.

In 2010, he joined Montreal Impact's academy in the league's first division. The following season, Ilcu was signed to Montreal's senior team but still was loaned out to the academy side. Throughout the 2011 season, he helped the academy team secure a postseason. Montreal would be eliminated from the playoff tournament in the first round by Capital City.

His final season with the academy occurred during the 2012 season. He would help Montreal secure another playoff berth by finishing second in the division. Ilcu would provide both goals in Montreal's victory over Toronto FC's academy in the first round of the playoffs. In the next round, Montreal would defeat the York Region Shooters to qualify for the championship final. He made his second championship appearance where Montreal lost the match to Toronto Croatia.

=== Montreal Impact ===
Ilcu made his debut for Montreal Impact in the North American Soccer League on 9 April 2011 against Tampa Bay. He secured a permanent spot on the roster on July 13, 2011. IIcu would record his first goal for Montreal on August 15, 2011, against the Atlanta Silverbacks. In his debut season with Montreal, he appeared in 11 matches and recorded 1 goal.

In the early winter of 2012, he was invited to the preseason camp held by Montreal. He would injure his knee which caused him to miss the majority of the season. After the conclusion of the 2012 season, he was selected for the Italian tour to play in several friendly matches. Throughout the tour, he played against Fiorentina's reserve team and recorded a goal. He was invited to the winter offseason training camp in 2013. After the conclusion of the training camp, Montreal declined to extend his contract. Ilcu would play in the MLS Reserve League with Montreal reserve squad in 2013.

=== College ===
In 2013, he transitioned to the college level by playing with the Montreal Carabins soccer program. Ilcu would be named to second all-star team in 2015.

== International career ==
Ilcu was called to the Canada men's national under-15 soccer team camp in 2006.

== Career stats ==
Team	Season	League	Domestic League			Domestic Playoffs			Domestic Cup^{1}			Concacaf Competition^{2}			Total		
Team	Season	League	Apps	Goals	Assists	Apps	Goals	Assists	Apps	Goals	Assists	Apps	Goals	Assists	Apps	Goals	Assists
Trois-Rivières Attak	2009	CSL	10	4	2	-	-	-	-	-	-	-	-	-	10	4	2
Montreal Impact Academy	2010	CSL	10	3	2	-	-	-	-	-	-	-	-	-	10	3	2
Montreal Impact	2011	NASL	5	1	0	-	-	-	-	-	-	-	-	-	5	1	0
		Total CSL	20	7	4	-	-	-	-	-	-	-	-	-	20	7	4
		Total NASL	5	1	0	-	-	-	-	-	-	-	-	-	5	1	0

== Personal life ==
Ilcu's father Mihai was also a footballer who played for FC Politehnica Timișoara in the 1980s. His niece Marieta is a former long jumper.

== Honors ==
Trois-Rivières Attak

- CSL Championship: 2009
- Canadian Soccer League National Division: 2009

Montreal Impact Academy

- CSL Championship Runners-up: 2012
