= Luke Kreamalmeyer =

American soccer player

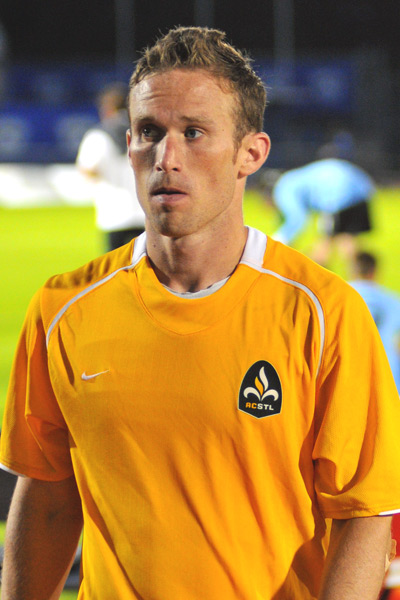

Personal information
- Date of birth: September 28, 1982 (age 44)
- Place of birth: Edwardsville, Illinois, United States
- Height: 5 ft 9 in (1.75 m)
- Position: Midfielder

College career
Years	Team	Apps	(Gls)
2001–2004	Bradley Braves		

Senior career*
Years	Team	Apps	(Gls)
2003	St. Louis Strikers	10	(7)
2004	Chicago Fire Premier	15	(6)
2005	Real Salt Lake	6	(0)
2006–2007	Portland Timbers	54	(15)
2008	Rochester Rhinos	34	(7)
2009	Carolina RailHawks	26	(6)
2010	AC St. Louis	29	(7)
2011	Montreal Impact	20	(1)
- * Club domestic league appearances and goals as of May 14, 2011

Luke Kreamalmeyer (born September 28, 1982, in Edwardsville, Illinois) is a professional American soccer player.

== Career ==
=== College and amateur ===
Kreamalmeyer attended Edwardsville High School where he scored a hat trick in the final state championship soccer game. Kreamalmeyer scored a record high 38 goals his senior season at Edwardsville and added 13 assists. Kreamalmeyer was voted First-team All American during his senior season at Edwardsville. Luke recorded 74 total goals at Edwardsville. He then played college soccer at Bradley University from 2001 to 2004. Luke made the MVC-All Freshman team in 2001. Kreamalmeyer was named first team All-Missouri Valley Conference as a junior and senior, and finished his career with 26 goals and 20 assists for the Braves. He also played for Chicago Fire Premier in the USL Premier Development League.

=== Professional ===
Upon graduating from Bradley, Kreamalmeyer was named the MVP at the MLS player combine in 2005. Due to his small stature, he fell in the 2005 MLS SuperDraft, until Real Salt Lake took him with the 37th overall pick. Kreamalmeyer played in six games as a rookie and was released after the season (added one assist). Kreamalmeyer then played in 2006 for the Portland Timbers of USL First Division and led the team with 9 goals. Kreamalmeyer was also named USL-1 All-League First-team in 2006 and was the MVP of the Timbers team. Kreamalmeyer also played for the Timbers in 2007, but missed half the season due to an injury. He had 4 assists and one goal during half of the season.

In 2008 Kreamalmeyer played for the Rochester Rhinos. He tied for the Rhinos 2008 team lead in scoring with 17 points on 4 goals and 9 assists. In January 2009, he signed with the Carolina RailHawks. Kreamalmeyer added 4 goals and two assists on 22 starts before joining AC St Louis. In his first season with AC St Louis, Kreamalmeyer tied Mike Ambersley for the team lead in points with 18. He scored 5 goals and had 8 assists on the season. Kreamalmeyer's 8 assists tied Martin Nash for the assist lead in NASL during the 2010 season. Kreamalmeyer has played 150 professional games concluding the 2010 season with 25 goals and 24 assists in his career.

Kreamalmeyer signed a one-year contract with Montreal Impact of the North American Soccer League on February 17, 2011. He was released by Montreal on October 12, 2011.

== Career stats ==
Team	Season	League	Domestic League			Domestic Playoffs			Domestic Cup^{1}			Concacaf Competition^{2}			Total		
Team	Season	League	Apps	Goals	Assists	Apps	Goals	Assists	Apps	Goals	Assists	Apps	Goals	Assists	Apps	Goals	Assists
St. Louis Strikers	2003	PDL	7	3	1	-	-	-	-	-	-	-	-	-	7	3	1
Chicago Fire Premier	2004	PDL	15	5	6	2	0	0				-	-	-	17	3	6
Real Salt Lake	2005	MLS	6	0	1	-	-	-	-	-	-	-	-	-	6	0	1
Portland Timbers	2006	USL-1	28	9	4	-	-	-	1	1	0	-	-	-	29	7	4
Portland Timbers	2007	USL-1	26	4	4	2	0	0	1	0	1	-	-	-	29	2	5
Rochester Rhinos	2008	USL-1	30	4	9	4	0	0	2	1	0	-	-	-	36	5	9
Carolina RailHawks FC	2009	USL-1	26	5	3	1	0	0	1	0	0	-	-	-	28	5	0
AC St. Louis	2010	USSF D2	29	5	8	-	-	-	2	0	1	-	-	-	31	5	9
Montreal Impact	2011	NASL	19	1	1	-	-	-	2	0	0	-	-	-	21	1	1
		Total PDL	22	6	7	2	0	0	-	-	-	-	-	-	24	6	7
		Total NASL	158	25	29	7	0	0	9	2	2	-	-	-	174	27	31
		Total MLS	6	0	1	-	-	-	-	-	-	-	-	-	6	0	0
