= Kevin Hatchi =

French footballer (born 1981)

Personal information
- Full name: Kevin Roland Benjamin Germain Hatchi
- Date of birth: 6 August 1981 (age 45)
- Place of birth: Paris, France
- Height: 1.78 m (5 ft 10 in)
- Positions: Defender; winger

Youth career
- 1997–2001: AJ Auxerre

Senior career*
Years	Team	Apps	(Gls)
2001–2002	US Créteil-Lusitanos	17	(0)
2002–2005	Grenoble Foot 38	77	(1)
2005–2007	Excelsior Mouscron	44	(2)
2007–2008	Tours FC	13	(0)
2008	R.A.E.C. Mons	12	(0)
2009	FC Seoul	11	(0)
2009–2010	Astra Ploieşti	7	(0)
2011	Montreal Impact	8	(1)
2012	FC Edmonton	21	(1)
- * Club domestic league appearances and goals

Kevin Hatchi (born 6 August 1981) is a French footballer who most recently played for FC Edmonton in the North American Soccer League.

== Career ==
=== World Traveller ===
On 4 March 2009 the midfielder left R.A.E.C. Mons to join FC Seoul, the French player's contract with the Belgian club expired at the end of the season. He made his debut in FC Seoul at 2009 K-League opening match against Chunnam Dragons. He then signed for Astra Ploieşti in 2009 for one year.

On 10 February 2011, Hatchi signed a one-year deal with the Montreal Impact. He made his debut, and scored his first goal, for his new club on 16 April 2011, a 2–1 loss to the Carolina RailHawks. Hatchi was released by Montreal on 15 June 2011.

He joined FC Edmonton of the North American Soccer League on 17 November 2011.
