= Amir Lowery =

American soccer player

Personal information
- Full name: Amir Lowery
- Date of birth: December 26, 1983 (age 42)
- Place of birth: Washington, D.C., United States
- Height: 1.87 m (6 ft 2 in)
- Positions: Defender; midfielder

College career
Years	Team	Apps	(Gls)
2001–2004	Wake Forest Demon Deacons		

Senior career*
Years	Team	Apps	(Gls)
2001	Chesapeake Dragons		
2004	Carolina Dynamo	19	(1)
2005	Colorado Rapids	1	(0)
2005	→ Atlanta Silverbacks (loan)	5	(0)
2007–2008	Kansas City Wizards	0	(0)
2008	San Jose Earthquakes	0	(0)
2009–2010	Carolina RailHawks	49	(1)
2011	FC Honka	0	(0)
2011	Montreal Impact	24	(1)
2012	Carolina RailHawks	26	(0)
- * Club domestic league appearances and goals as of September 26, 2012

Amir Lowery (born December 26, 1983) is an American former soccer player.

== Career ==
=== College and amateur ===
Lowery attended Wake Forest University where he played on the men's soccer team from 2001 to 2004. In 2001, Lowery played for the Chesapeake Dragons of the USL Premier Development League. During the summer of 2004, he played one season with the Carolina Dynamo.

=== Professional ===
In February 2005, Colorado Rapids selected Lowery in the third round (45th overall) in the 2005 MLS SuperDraft. He was also selected by the Philadelphia KiXX in the fourth round of the Major Indoor Soccer League draft, but signed with the Rapids. Lowery played only two first team games and eleven reserve games with the Rapids during the 2005 season. On August 5, 2005, the Rapids sent Lowery on loan to Atlanta Silverbacks in the USL First Division. He played five games with the Silverbacks. The Rapids waived him on March 3, 2006.

Lowery signed with Kansas City Wizards for the 2007 season and played thirteen reserve games. He played in a crowded midfield and eventually asked to play center back. The Wiz released him following the season and he signed with San Jose Earthquakes on May 22, 2008. In March 2009, he signed with Carolina RailHawks in the USL First Division where he enjoyed considerable success being one of the leaders on the team in minutes played over his two seasons there.

On March 30, 2011, Lowery signed a one-year contract with Montreal Impact of the North American Soccer League.

After one season with Montreal, Lowery signed in February 2012 for a second spell with Carolina RailHawks.

== Career stats ==
Team	Season	League	Domestic League			Domestic Playoffs			Domestic Cup^{1}			Concacaf Competition^{2}			Total		
Team	Season	League	Apps	Goals	Assists	Apps	Goals	Assists	Apps	Goals	Assists	Apps	Goals	Assists	Apps	Goals	Assists
Colorado Rapids	2005	MLS	1	0	0	-	-	-	-	-	-	-	-	-	1	0	0
Atlanta Silverbacks	2005	USSF D2	5	0	0	-	-	-	-	-	-	-	-	-	5	0	0
Kansas City Wizards	2007	MLS	-	-	-	-	-	-	-	-	-	-	-	-	0	0	0
Kansas City Wizards	2008	MLS	-	-	-	-	-	-	-	-	-	-	-	-	0	0	0
San Jose Earthquakes	2008	MLS	-	-	-	-	-	-	-	-	-	-	-	-	0	0	0
Carolina RailHawks FC	2009	USSF D2	22	1	0	-	-	-	2	0	1	-	-	-	24	1	1
Carolina RailHawks FC	2010	USSF D2	27	0	0	5	1	0	2	0	0	-	-	-	34	1	0
Montreal Impact	2011	NASL	12	1	1	-	-	-	2	0	0	-	-	-	14	1	1
Carolina RailHawks FC	2012	NASL	26	0	0	3	1	0	3	1	0	-	-	-	32	2	0
		Total USSF D2	54	1	0	5	1	0	4	0	1	-	-	-	63	2	1
		Total NASL	38	1	1	3	1	0	5	1	0	-	-	-	46	3	1
		Total MLS	1	0	0	-	-	-	-	-	-	-	-	-	1	0	0

== Politics ==
In 2020, Lowery announced he will be running for District of Columbia's Delegate to the United States House of Representatives.
