= Rudy Doliscat =

Canadian soccer player

Personal information
- Date of birth: November 16, 1967 (age 58)
- Place of birth: Port-au-Prince, Haïti
- Height: 5 ft 10 in (1.78 m)
- Position: Defender

Youth career
- Keene State College

Senior career*
Years	Team	Apps	(Gls)
1990–1992	Montreal Supra	62	(5)
1993–1996	Montreal Impact	66	(2)
1995–1996	Buffalo Blizzard (indoor)	30	(11)
1996–1997	Cincinnati Silverbacks (indoor)	36	(11)
1997	Sacramento Knights (indoor)		
1997–1999	Montreal Impact (indoor)	69	(16)
1998	Montreal Impact	13	(1)
1999	Toronto Lynx	18	(0)
1999–2000	Philadelphia KiXX (indoor)	36	(1)

International career
1992–1995	Canada	5	(1)
- * Club domestic league appearances and goals

Rudy Doliscat (born November 16, 1967, in Port-au-Prince, Haïti) is a former professional Canadian soccer defender.

== Club career ==
Doliscat made his pro debut in the Canadian Soccer League with the Montreal Supra. After the team folded he joined the Montreal Impact. He was a member of the Impact's inaugural edition in 1993, where he played 20 games. He was the first Impact player to commit a foul in club history on May 14, 1993, against Los Angeles Salsa. In 1994, he was part of the team's starting eleven when the Impact beat the Colorado Foxes 1–0 in the playoff final and won the League Championship. He was the championship MVP.

In 1996, he was one of the five defenders to take part in at least 20 games and help Montreal post the best defence in the league with 18 goals allowed in 27 games, a club record at the time. During the 1995-1996 indoor season, Doliscat played for the Buffalo Blizzard of the National Professional Soccer League. He was named First Team All Rookie. In 1997, Doliscat played for the Sacramento Knights in the Continental Indoor Soccer League. He returned to the Impact that fall to play for the team in the NPSL. He remained with the Impact for the outdoor season. In 1999 when Montreal's new ownership chose not to play the 1999 outdoor season in order to better prepare the 1999-2000 indoor season, he joined arch-rivals the Toronto Lynx. Leaving Montreal with 3 Regular-Season Titles in 1995, 1996, 1997 and one League Championship, and playing a total of 79 games and scoring 3 goals.

In 1999 Doliscat played his last season in the USL First Division with the Toronto where he played 18 games and recorded 3 assists. He then moved to the Philadelphia KiXX for the 1999-2000 indoor season.

== International career ==
Doliscat made his debut for Canada in an April 1992 friendly match against China and went on to earn 5 caps, scoring 1 goal, which gave Canada a draw against Morocco in a World Cup preparation match in June 1994.

His final international was a January 1995 Sky Dome Cup game against Portugal.

=== International goals ===
Scores and results list Canada's goal tally first.

#	Date	Venue	Opponent	Score	Result	Competition
1	June 1, 1994	Complexe sportif Claude-Robillard, Montreal, Canada	Morocco	1–1	1–1	Friendly match

== Coaching career ==
Once he retired he was named head coach of the Canada national soccer team for the Francophone Games in 2005. But Canada was eliminated from Francophone Games after losing all three of their games. After his unsuccessful stint as coach he became technical assistant director at the Quebec Soccer Federation and as well is a soccer analyst for the RDS sports network.

== Honours ==
- American Professional Soccer League: 1

1994
