= Stefano Pesoli =

Italian footballer

Personal information
- Date of birth: February 29, 1984 (age 42)
- Place of birth: Anagni, Italy
- Height: 6 ft 1 in (1.85 m)
- Position: Defender

Youth career
- 1994–2002: Roma

Senior career*
| Years | Team | Apps | (Gls) |
| 2002–2003 | Viterbese | 6 | (0) |
| 2003–2004 | Calangianus | 30 | (0) |
| 2004–2005 | Pro Vasto | | |
| 2005–2006 | Monterotondo | 34 | (0) |
| 2006–2007 | Rieti | 26 | (0) |
| 2007 | Melfi | 0 | (0) |
| 2008–2010 | Montreal Impact | 39 | (2) |
- * Club domestic league appearances and goals as of April 11, 2010

Stefano Pesoli (born February 29, 1984) is an Italian footballer.

== Career ==
=== Europe ===
Pesoli began his career in the youth system of the famed Serie A club AS Roma but never played for the first team; he spent the majority of his early career in the Italian lower leagues, playing for Viterbese, Calangianus, Pro Vasto, Monterotondo, Rieti and Melfi.

=== North America ===
Pesoli signed for Montreal Impact in the USL First Division in 2008, and on December 2, 2008 Impact announced the re-signing of central defenders Nevio Pizzolitto and Pesoli to a two-year contracts. On July 8, 2010, he was released by the Montreal Impact.

== Honors ==
=== Montreal Impact ===
- USL First Division Championship (1): 2009
