= Grant Needham =

Canadian soccer player

Personal information
- Date of birth: 14 July 1970 (age 56)
- Place of birth: Liverpool, England
- Height: 1.78 m (5 ft 10 in)
- Position: Striker

College career
Years	Team	Apps	(Gls)
1990–1991	Concordia Stingers		

Senior career*
Years	Team	Apps	(Gls)
1992	Montreal Supra	82	(24)
1993	Toronto Blizzard	7	(0)
1993–1998	Montreal Impact	87	(19)
1996–1997	→ Buffalo Blizzard (loan)	21	(4)
1997–2000	Montreal Impact (indoor)	78	(78)
2000	Hampton Roads Mariners	1	(0)

International career
1988	Canada U20	2	(0)
1991–1992	Canada U23	10	(3)
1991–1993	Canada	2	(0)
Medal record
Representing Canada
Men's Association football
North American Nations Cup
Third place	1991 United States
- * Club domestic league appearances and goals

Grant Needham (born 14 July 1970) is a Canadian former international soccer player who played as a striker.

== Early and personal life ==
Needham was born in Liverpool, England, and raised in Montreal, where he started playing soccer at the age of 10.

== Club career ==
Needham played college soccer for Concordia Stingers and at senior level for Montreal Supra, Toronto Blizzard, Montreal Impact, Buffalo Blizzard and Montreal Impact (indoor).

== International career ==
Needham represented Canada at under-20, under-23 and senior levels.

His first senior appearance came in a 0–2 defeat in a March 1991 North American Nations Cup match against the United States in Torrance, California. His second and final game was a 15 August 1993 World Cup qualification match against Australia in Sydney.

== Later career ==
Needham was inducted as a 'builder' by the Montreal Impact in August 2007; he worked for the club as an ambassador and radio commentator.

== Honours ==
Canada

- North American Nations Cup: 3rd place, 1991
