= António Ribeiro (soccer, born 1980) =

Canadian soccer player

Personal information
- Full name: António Manuel Ribeiro
- Date of birth: October 8, 1980 (age 46)
- Place of birth: Aveiro, Portugal
- Height: 5 ft 9 in (1.75 m)
- Position: Midfielder

Senior career*
| Years | Team | Apps | (Gls) |
| 2000–2001 | Montreal Impact | 12 | (0) |
| 2002 | Panellinios | | |
| 2003–2008 | Montreal Impact | 106 | (10) |
| 2008 | → Trois-Rivières Attak (loan) | 1 | (0) |
| 2009 | San Jose Earthquakes | 7 | (0) |
| 2010–2011 | Montreal Impact | 20 | (2) |
| 2012 | FC L'Assomption | 9 | (0) |
| 2013 | FC Boisbriand | 10 | (0) |
| Total | | 165 | (12) |

International career^{‡}
| 2007–2010 | Canada | 3 | (0) |
- * Club domestic league appearances and goals as of April 12, 2016 ‡ National team caps and goals as of December 30, 2009

António Ribeiro (born October 8, 1980) is a Canadian retired soccer player.

== Club career ==
=== Montreal Impact ===
Born in Aveiro, Portugal, Ribeiro began his soccer career with the Montreal Impact in 2000, but did not play a major role with the Impact that year. In 2002, he was released by the Impact and signed with Panellinios, with whom he won the Canadian national championship title at the senior amateur level in 2002.

In 2004, he returned to the Impact and helped the team to secure the franchise's first double (the League Championship as well the Voyageurs Cup). In 2005, he scored the winning goal against the Vancouver Whitecaps FC to clinch the Regular-Season Title for the Impact and as well as their third strait Voyageurs cup. He also helped the Impact to a 15-game undefeated streak which marked a new league record in the USL First Division.

In 2006, he had his best season yet offensively with the Impact, scoring three goals and three assists for a total of nine points. Played his 80th career game with the Impact on August 4 at Virginia Beach Mariners, giving him sole possession of 15th place in club history in that respect, ahead of Rudy Doliscat. He helped the impact win the Regular-Season Title for the third straight year as well helped the team win the Voyageurs Cup. Though the Impact failed to capture the League Championship for the second straight year. On April 12, 2008, Ribeiro appeared in his 100th game for the Impact against the Vancouver Whitecaps FC. He helped the Impact qualify for the CONCACAF Champions League by winning the Nutrilite Canadian Championship, and helped the club reach the quarter finals in the Champions League.

On January 5, 2009, Montreal Impact announced that Ribeiro was not granted a new contract extension for the 2009 season.

=== San Jose Earthquakes ===
On June 12, 2009, the San Jose Earthquakes announced their signing of Ribeiro. He was cut during the 2010 training camp.

=== Return to Montreal ===
On July 16, 2010, Ribeiro returned to the Montreal Impact on a two-year contract. He made his return on July 23, 2010, and scored shortly after being subbed into the game in the second half.

== International career ==
Ribeiro played in the CONCACAF qualifying games with the Canada U-20 team in 1998, scoring in a 3–1 win against Trinidad & Tobago.

Ribeiro received his first senior international cap for Canada as he appeared for the first time on the Canadian men's team against Venezuela in a friendly match in June 2007. By December 2009, he earned a total of two caps, scoring no goals. He was selected to compete for the Canadian men's team for the 2007 CONCACAF Gold Cup, but remained on the bench throughout the tournament.

== Coaching ==
Ribeiro opened the football school "École de Soccer Ditullio-Ribeiro" with his former teammate Jason DiTullio in 2007. He is the Technical Director of the Delta Soccer club in Laval, Québec since 2016.

== Career stats ==
| Team | Season | League | Domestic League | | | Domestic Playoffs | | | Domestic Cup^{1} | | | Concacaf Competition^{2} | | | Total | | |
| Team | Season | League | Apps | Goals | Assists | Apps | Goals | Assists | Apps | Goals | Assists | Apps | Goals | Assists | Apps | Goals | Assists |
|---|---|---|---|---|---|---|---|---|---|---|---|---|---|---|---|---|---|
| Montreal Impact | 2000 | USL-1 | 11 | 0 | 0 | - | - | - | - | - | - | - | - | - | 11 | 0 | 0 |
| Montreal Impact | 2001 | USL-1 | 1 | 0 | 0 | - | - | - | - | - | - | - | - | - | 1 | 0 | 0 |
| Montreal Impact | 2003 | USL-1 | 7 | 1 | 0 | 2 | 0 | 0 | - | - | - | - | - | - | 9 | 1 | 0 |
| Montreal Impact | 2004 | USL-1 | 28 | 1 | 2 | - | - | - | - | - | - | - | - | - | 28 | 1 | 2 |
| Montreal Impact | 2005 | USL-1 | 23 | 2 | 2 | 2 | 0 | 0 | - | - | - | - | - | - | 25 | 2 | 2 |
| Montreal Impact | 2006 | USL-1 | 14 | 3 | 3 | - | - | - | - | - | - | - | - | - | 14 | 3 | 3 |
| Montreal Impact | 2007 | USL-1 | 15 | 2 | 1 | 1 | 0 | 0 | - | - | - | - | - | - | 16 | 2 | 1 |
| Montreal Impact | 2008 | USL-1 | 20 | 1 | 1 | 4 | 2 | 0 | 2 | 0 | 0 | 4 | 0 | 0 | 30 | 3 | 1 |
| Trois-Rivières Attak | 2008 | CSL | 1 | 0 | 0 | - | - | - | - | - | - | - | - | - | 1 | 0 | 0 |
| San Jose Earthquakes | 2009 | MLS | 7 | 0 | 0 | - | - | - | - | - | - | - | - | - | 7 | 0 | 0 |
| Montreal Impact | 2010 | USSF D2 | 12 | 2 | 2 | 3 | 0 | 0 | - | - | - | - | - | - | 15 | 2 | 2 |
| Montreal Impact | 2011 | NASL | 13 | 0 | 1 | - | - | - | 2 | 0 | 0 | - | - | - | 15 | 0 | 1 |
| | | Total CSL | 1 | 0 | 0 | - | - | - | - | - | - | - | - | - | 1 | 0 | 0 |
| | | Total MLS | 7 | 0 | 0 | - | - | - | - | - | - | - | - | - | 7 | 0 | 0 |
| | | Total NASL | 144 | 12 | 12 | 12 | 2 | 0 | 4 | 0 | 0 | 4 | 0 | 0 | 164 | 14 | 12 |
