= Mignane Diouf =

Senegalese footballer

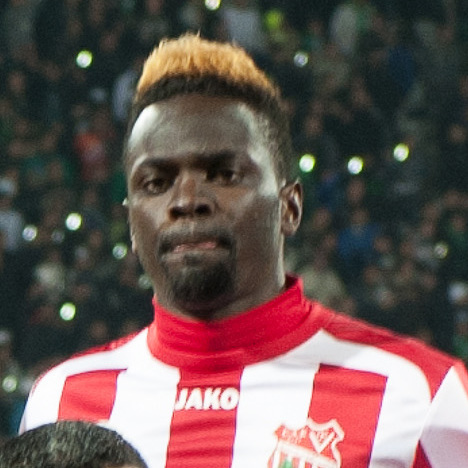
- Diouf in January 2015

Personal information
- Full name: Mignane Diouf
- Date of birth: February 1, 1989 (age 37)
- Place of birth: Saly, Senegal
- Height: 1.78 m (5 ft 10 in)
- Position: Forward

Senior career*
| Years | Team | Apps | (Gls) |
| 2010–2013 | Diambars | 0 | (0) |
| 2010 | → Tromsø IL (loan) | 1 | (0) |
| 2011 | → Montreal Impact (loan) | 23 | (3) |
| 2013–2016 | Olympique Khouribga | 15 | (1) |
| 2014–2015 | → CA Khénifra (loan) | | |
| 2016–2017 | Muscat | | |
| 2017–2019 | Al-Kawkab | | |
| 2020 | Al-Orobah | | |
| 2020–2021 | Al-Sadd | | |

International career
| 2013– | Senegal | 1 | (0) |
- * Club domestic league appearances and goals

Mignane Diouf (born February 1, 1989, in Saly) is a Senegalese footballer who plays as a forward, most recently for Al-Sadd.

== Career ==
Diouf signed for Senegal National League 2 club Diambars in 2010, aged 21, before being loaned out to Tromsø IL in Norway where he made one appearance in 2010.

On May 6, 2011, Diouf was sent on loan again, this time to the Montreal Impact in the North American Soccer League. He made his debut for Montreal on May 14, 2011, in a 2–1 loss to the Carolina RailHawks, and scored his first goal for the club on June 4 in a 2–0 win over FC Edmonton.
