= Philippe Billy =

French footballer (born 1982)

Personal information
- Full name: Philippe Billy
- Date of birth: 13 January 1982 (age 44)
- Place of birth: Nantes, France
- Height: 1.82 m (6 ft 0 in)
- Position: Defender

Youth career
- 1996–1998: Nantes
- 1998–1999: Carquefou
- 1999–2000: Laval

Senior career*
Years	Team	Apps	(Gls)
2000–2001	Laval	10	(0)
2001–2006	Lecce	16	(0)
2003	→ Bastia (loan)	4	(0)
2004–2005	→ Mons (loan)	34	(0)
2006–2007	Laval	23	(1)
2007–2009	Brest	20	(0)
2010–2011	Montreal Impact	55	(2)
2012–2014	USJA Carquefou	50	(0)
2014–2016	Laval B	39	(2)
2016–2017	US Changé	18	(0)
Total		269	(5)

International career
	France U-21	5	(0)
2008	Brittany	1	(0)
- * Club domestic league appearances and goals

Philippe Billy (born 13 January 1982) is a French former professional footballer who played as a defender.

== Club career ==
Billy was born in Nantes. He played extensively at French football clubs after making his professional debut in 2000, for clubs including Bastia in Ligue 1 and Laval and Brest in Ligue 2.

He also played several seasons for Lecce in the Italian Serie A between 2001 and 2006, and one season with Mons in the Belgian Jupiler League in 2004–05.

On 27 January 2010, he signed with the Montreal Impact of USSF Division 2. He was released by Montreal on 12 October 2011.

One year later, in November 2012, he signs with USJA Carquefou in the French third division.

== International career ==
Billy made five appearances for the French U-21 team during his youth, but has never been called up to the senior national side.

He also played for the non-FIFA affiliated Brittany national football team in a friendly game against Congo in 2008.
