= Gil Orriols =

Spanish football manager (born 1977)

Personal information
- Full name: Gil Orriols Jansana
- Date of birth: 17 March 1977 (age 49)
- Place of birth: Barcelona, Catalonia, Spain

Managerial career
- Years: Team
- 2003–2005: Barcelona C (youth coach)
- 2005: Montreal Impact (physical performance manager)
- 2005–2009: ASPIRE Academy (academy coach)
- 2009–2011: Montreal Impact (assistant)
- 2012: Montreal Impact (assistant)
- 2012: KAS Eupen (assistant)

Gil Orriols Jansana (born 17 January 1977) is a Spanish footballer manager.

== Early life ==
Orriols was born in Barcelona, Catalonia. He is a former Alpine Skier and was 2000 champion of the Pierra Menta Jove. He made his master's degree in sport and physical education sciences at the University of Barcelona. He holds also a diploma in collective sports from the Institut Nacional d'Educació Física de Catalunya – Byomedic.

== Coaching career ==
Orriols began his coaching career in 2003 with Barcelona C in Catalonia, where he served as physical and high performance coach. Mostly coaching Barcelona's youth teams from U-9 to U-20. In 2005 Orriols left Barcelona to go abroad to Canada to sign with the Montreal Impact organization, accepting a physical performance role with the club. In Montreal he was responsible for creating a physical training plan adapted to the constraints of the Impact’s calendar. In August 2006 he accepted an offer from ASPIRE Academy in Qatar, where he was physical trainer until last October 2009. On 24 November 2009, he returned to Montreal to assume the role of assistant coach and physical performance manager under Marc Dos Santos.
