= Youssef Dahha =

Canadian soccer player, coach, and trainer

Youssef Dahha (born 9 August 1972) is the official goalkeeper trainer for the Canadian soccer team, the Vancouver Whitecaps FC in British Columbia, Canada.

== Career ==
Dahha played pro soccer in Morocco, and played for Morocco during the 1988 Olympic qualification rounds.

== Coaching career ==
Dahha coached the goalkeepers of the Trois-Rivières Attak and second tier Montreal Impact from 2004 to 2011. He continued with the Montreal Impact upon their entry into Major League Soccer until 2017. He has contributed in Canadian goalkeeper Greg Sutton's development and then helped Matt Jordan, Troy Perkins and Evan Bush to become dominant goalkeepers again. He was goalkeeper coach for Ottawa Fury FC in 2018. He was hired as the Vancouver Whitecaps FC goalkeeper coach on 7 December 2018.
