= Nick De Santis =

Canadian soccer player

Personal information
- Full name: Nicolas De Santis
- Date of birth: September 11, 1967 (age 59)
- Place of birth: Montreal, Quebec, Canada
- Height: 6 ft 0 in (1.83 m)
- Position: Midfielder

Senior career*
Years	Team	Apps	(Gls)
1988–1992	Montreal Supra	90	(3)
1992–1993	Termoli	17	(2)
1993–1998	Montreal Impact	134	(19)
1995	Kansas City Attack (indoor)	15	(1)
1996	Chicago Power (indoor)	16	(8)
1996–1997	Edmonton Drillers (indoor)	38	(43)
1997–2000	Montreal Impact (indoor)	84	(28)
1999	Raleigh Capital Express	26	(1)
2000–2003	Montreal Impact	85	(2)
2000–2001	Toronto ThunderHawks (indoor)	38	(8)

International career^{‡}
1986–1987	Canada U-20	18	(0)
1988–1997	Canada	11	(1)

Managerial career
- 2004–2008: Montreal Impact
- 2011: Montreal Impact (interim)
- * Club domestic league appearances and goals as of 22 October 2011 ‡ National team caps and goals as of 13 November 2009

Nicolas De Santis (born November 11, 1967) is a Canadian former professional soccer player.

== Club career ==
After beginning his pro career in 1987 with the Montreal Supra of the Canadian Soccer League, he signed for the Montreal Impact in 1993 where he helped the Impact win the league championship in 1994. He earned titles in 1995, 1996 and 1997. He retired as a player following the 2003 season, was second in Impact history for games played (219), as well as fourth for goals scored (21). He also had short spells in the US and Italy. De Santis had a stint in the National Professional Soccer League with the short lived expansion franchise the Toronto ThunderHawks during the 2000-2001 winter indoor season. He helped the ThunderHawks reach the postseason by finishing second in the National Conference, and reached the Conference finals where they were defeated by the Milwaukee Wave.

== International career ==
De Santis represented Canada at the 1987 Pan American Games and 1987 FIFA World Youth Championship. He made his senior debut for Canada in a March 1988 friendly match against Peru, in which he immediately scored his first (and only) goal. He went on to earn 11 caps. His final international was an October 1997 FIFA World Cup qualification match against Mexico.

He also participated in the inaugural 1989 Futsal World Cup in the Netherlands.

=== International goals ===
Scores and results list Canada's goal tally first.

#	Date	Venue	Opponent	Score	Result	Competition
1	26 March 1988	Lima, Peru	Peru	2–1	3–1	Friendly match

== Managerial career ==
After his retirement he succeeded Bob Lilley as the new head coach of the Montreal Impact. In his first season as head coach he won the Montreals second League Championship beating Seattle Sounders 2–0. In his second season as coach he led the team to a record of 18-3-7 and to its fourth regular-season championship, he established a new league record by going undefeated in 15 consecutive games (10–0–5). Montreal also went undefeated for nine straight games on the road (6–0–3), a new club record. He also established a new club record for fewest losses in a season. Though the Impact lost in the playoffs, He was named Coach of the Year in the USL First Division.

In 2006 his third season as head coach he helped the Impact win their fifth regular-season championship, but the Impact were knocked out in the semi-final of the playoffs against the Vancouver Whitecaps in a 2–0 defeat. He also guided the team to its best start to the season at home, with a 10-game undefeated streak, as well collect 10 shutouts at home which tied a club record. And allow only four goals at home, a new club record that erases the old mark of six set in 1994 and was tied in 1996 and 2004.

After a poor record to start the 2008 season, De Santis stepped down as head coach of the Impact and was replaced by John Limniatis on June 13, 2008.

== Honours ==
- APSL Championship: 1

1994

- USL First Division Championship: 1

1994

- USL First Division Regular Season Championship: 3

1995, 1996, 1997

- Voyageurs Cup: 2

2002, 2003

== Career statistics ==
Team	Season	League	Domestic League			Domestic Playoffs			Total		
Team	Season	League	Apps	Goals	Assists	Apps	Goals	Assists	Apps	Goals	Assists
Montreal Impact	1993	APSL	20	1	0	-	-	-	20	1	0
Montreal Impact	1994	APSL	17	2	4	3	0	0	20	2	4
Montreal Impact	1995	A-League	20	3	1	3	0	1	23	3	2
Montreal Impact	1996	A-League	26	4	3	3	0	0	29	4	3
Montreal Impact	1997	A-League	22	5	10	-	-	-	22	5	10
Montreal Impact	1998	A-League	26	4	5	3	0	2	29	4	7
Raleigh Capital Express	1999	A-League	26	1	3	-	-	-	26	1	3
Montreal Impact	2000	A-League	25	1	2	-	-	-	25	1	2
Montreal Impact	2001	A-League	17	0	1	-	-	-	17	0	1
Montreal Impact	2002	A-League	18	1	1	3	0	0	21	1	1
Montreal Impact	2003	A-League	25	0	1	-	-	-	25	0	1
Career Total		-	245	22	31	15	0	3	260	22	34

Last Update: June 22, 2009

== Managerial statistics ==
Team	From	To	Record				
Team	From	To	G	W	L	D	Win %
Montreal Impact	May 25, 2004	June 10, 2008	112	63	20	29	56.25
