= Montreal Impact (1993–2011) =

Former Canadian soccer team

- Founded: December 10, 1992
- Dissolved: 2011 (MLS 2012)
- Stadium: Complexe Sportif Claude-Robillard; Saputo Stadium
- Capacity: 13,034
- Owner: Joey Saputo

The Montreal Impact (French: Impact de Montréal) was a Canadian professional soccer club based in Montreal, Quebec. Founded in 1993, the team played in various leagues in the second tier of the United States soccer league system, beginning with the American Professional Soccer League. They later played in the A-League/USL First Division, the USSF D2 Pro League, and the North American Soccer League. Following the 2011 season, the Impact were replaced by a team of the same name which joined Major League Soccer in 2012.

The team played its home games at Complexe Sportif Claude-Robillard until 2008 when it moved to the new Saputo Stadium where it played until its move to MLS. The team's colours were blue and white.

The Impact also operated a reserve team, the Trois-Rivières Attak, from 2006 until 2010 which played in the Canadian Soccer League until 2010 when the Impact created their own Montreal Impact Academy. They also used to operate an indoor team (of the same name) in the NPSL (at the Bell Centre, then at Complexe sportif Claude-Robillard) with many of the same players, from 1997–1998 to 1999–2000.

On May 7, 2010, Impact owner Joey Saputo was granted a Major League Soccer expansion franchise set to begin play in Saputo Stadium in 2012. Although, in a legal sense, the MLS team is an entirely separate legal entity, the new team (now known as CF Montréal) retained the name Montreal Impact until 2021 and maintains the team's legacy in MLS.

== History ==
Original Impact logos

The Impact club was founded in 1992 by the Saputo family, as the owners of the Montreal Supra of the Canadian Soccer League did not pursue an APSL franchise by the deadline set by the U.S. league. The Montreal ownership and front office split with their main financial sponsor announcing the start of a new APSL club on December 13, 1992, with the Supra coach. In 1993, the APSL was trying to gain the USSF Division 1 sanctioning required by FIFA with the award of the 1994 FIFA World Cup and the estimated $60 million in World Cup profits; it was seen as a league with much more upside than the CSL. They became a dominant club in the APSL (1993–1996) and the A-League (1997–2004), renamed the USL First Division (2005). The team did not compete during the 1999 A-League season. Their main rivals were the Rochester Rhinos and the Toronto Lynx prior to the latter's move to the USL Premier Development League.

Following a lacklustre first year, the Impact surprised the defending champion Colorado Foxes (1–0) on October 15, 1994, at home in front of a sold out Montreal crowd to claim their first league title. Subsequently, the team finished first or tied for first during the regular season in 1995, 1996, 1997 and 2003 without making it back to the final. The Impact lost to archrivals Rochester in their first four playoff encounters, in 1996, 1998, 2002 and 2003, before finally defeating them in 2004 en route to their second title. The club was favoured to repeat in 2005, but after a near-flawless season (3 losses in 28 games) the Impact were ousted in the semi-finals by the eventual champions, the Seattle Sounders (2–2, 1–2). The team also won the inaugural Voyageurs Cup in 2002 and successfully defended this title from 2003 to 2008. In 2009, the Impact were crowned at home for their third title, beating the Vancouver Whitecaps FC by an aggregate score of 6–3 in a Cinderella ending to a tumultuous season.

In 2004, the Impact finished first in the A-League's Eastern Conference before disposing of Rochester (1–0, 1–0), Syracuse (2–0, 1–1), and Seattle (2–0) in the playoffs to capture their second championship, 10 years after their first. The final in Montreal saw an all-time-record 13,648 fans at Complexe sportif Claude-Robillard Stadium (whose seating capacity for the day was adjusted from 10,100). The MVP was Mauricio Vincello who scored the winner at the 33rd minute of play. Frederick Commodore sealed the game with a goal at the 78th minute.

At the gate, the Impact had always been solid within the league before 1999 with average crowds of 4,000–5,000. After disappointing seasons in 2000 and 2001 (where the average gate was between 2,000 and 3,000 people), the team had new record attendances in 2002 (over 5,000 on average), 2003 (over 7,000 on average), 2004 (over 9,000 on average) and 2005–2006 (over 11,000 on average). The all-time single-game high was the 55,571 fans in attendance for the 2009 CONCACAF Champions League quarter-final against Santos Laguna (Mexico) at Olympic Stadium in Montreal.

In 1999, the owners had a conflict with the league and withdrew the team from competition, but did play indoor soccer that year in the National Professional Soccer League. After resurfacing in 2000, the club went bankrupt during the 2001 season when the then-owners were Ionian. Administered until the end of the season by one of the original pillars, Joey Saputo, the club rose from its ashes in 2002, set up as a nonprofit organization owned by the Quebec government, Hydro-Québec, and Saputo. It also attracted many big-time sponsors such as the National Bank of Canada, Bell Canada and Coca-Cola, among others. The team's mandate is to develop local talent and to serve as a representative of Montreal for tourism. Since the Impact's renaissance in 2002, Quebec-born players have played a much more central role in the Canada national team, after many years of non-selection. For the 2005 Gold Cup, players Gabriel Gervais, Sandro Grande, Patrick Leduc, Adam Braz and Ali Gerba, as well as former player Patrice Bernier and Quebec-born Olivier Occean were all called to the national team and did well by most accounts. The visibility helped Grande and Ali, who both transferred to Scandinavia shortly after the tournament. On July 15, 2006, the team won the 200th victory in its history.

For the first time in its history, the Montreal Impact contracted players to 10 months out of the year in 2008. This extended training camp was a first for the Montreal Impact and many in the media have stated that it is a move to next level in professional soccer. They began the year at the soccer training centre, Soccerplexe Catalogna before travelling to Italy for more training and three exhibition games against Italian clubs. They drew their first match 0–0 against third division Arezzo, lost their second match 1–0 against second division Frosinone and finally won their third encounter 1–0 against fourth division Cassino.

In 2008, the Montreal Impact won the Canadian Championship, gaining the chance to represent Canada in the CONCACAF Champions League. The tournament features the best teams in all of North and Central America and the Caribbean Islands. The Impact won two legs against Real Estali 1–0 and 0–0 to secure a spot in the tournament. Montreal competed then in the group stage where they defeated Joe Public FC of Trinidad 2–0 and 4–1 and CD Olimpia of Honduras 2–1 and 1–1. They finished off against Atlante FC of Mexico which they tied 0–0 and then lost 2–1.

On February 25, 2009, the team won the first leg of the quarterfinals match 2–0 against Santos Laguna from Mexico. The match was played at Montreal's Olympic Stadium in front of a club-record crowd of 55,571. The second leg was held on March 5, 2009, at Corona Stadium, in Torreon, Mexico, where the Impact led 2–1 at the half (4–1 on aggregate). With the Impact only a few minutes from a semi-final berth, Santos Laguna's Carlos Quintero scored twice in stoppage time to rally the homeside to a 5–2 victory, thus eliminating the Impact from the inaugural CONCACAF Champions League 5–4 on aggregate. Following the match, head coach John Limniatis commented that his side "should have done better", noting that it was "unfortunate to finish this way".

For the 2009 Canadian Championship, the Montreal Impact were eliminated early to the disappointment of fans. In the final match of the Voyageurs Cup, with the Impact already eliminated, Head Coach Marc Dos Santos decision to field a number of reserve team players drew controversy from fans of both the Impact and Vancouver Whitecaps FC. The team went on to suffer its worst defeat in history, by losing 6–1 to archrival Toronto FC of Major League Soccer. Toronto FC needed to win by 4 goals to advance to the CONCACAF Champions League 2009-10 preliminary round. As a result, the Vancouver Whitecaps FC were eliminated on goal differential, despite holding the same record as Toronto FC.

The Montreal Impact won their third championship in its history, Saturday October 17, 2009, in front of a sellout crowd of 13,034 at Saputo Stadium, defeating the Vancouver Whitecaps FC 3–1, (6–3 on aggregate goals), in the First Division USL final championship, which was the first all Canadian First Division USL Final. All three of Montreal's championships have been won at home. Montreal had an up and down year that involved firing their coach and struggling early on, so winning the championship was a pleasant surprise to their fans. All the players agreed this championship was more special than their first two because they were expected to win those ones, while the 2009 edition was a surprise finalist, that most experts thought wouldn't advance out of the quarterfinals.

In November 2009 the Impact announced their intent to leave the USL First Division to become the co-founders of a new North American Soccer League, which would begin play in 2010. The league, which has yet to be sanctioned by the United States Soccer Federation or the Canadian Soccer Association, would also comprise the Atlanta Silverbacks, Carolina Railhawks, Crystal Palace Baltimore, Miami FC, Minnesota Thunder, Tampa Bay Rowdies, Vancouver Whitecaps and a brand new team led by St. Louis Soccer United.

After lawsuits were filed and heated press statements exchanged, the USSF declared they would sanction neither league for the coming year, and ordered both to work together on a plan to temporarily allow their teams to play a 2010 season. The interim solution was announced on January 7, 2010, with the USSF running the new USSF D-2 league comprising clubs from both USL-1 and NASL.

=== The Impact and Major League Soccer ===
Towards the end of 2007, much speculation had been made about a possible franchise move from USL First Division to Major League Soccer. The construction of the expandable Saputo Stadium further suggested such an interest on the part of the Impact to move up to the top level American league. Chairman Joey Saputo held talks with George Gillett (former owner of Montreal Canadiens and co-owner of Liverpool F.C.) regarding possible joint ownership of an MLS franchise.

On July 24, 2008, MLS announced they were seeking to add two expansion teams for the 2011 season, of which Montreal was listed as a potential candidate. On November 22, 2008, the team's bid for an MLS franchise, was not retained by commissioner Don Garber. In response to Vancouver's successful bid in March 2009, Impact GM Nick De Santis commented that he expected chairman Joey Saputo to pursue and ultimately realize his vision of Montreal as an MLS franchise someday.

On May 16, 2009, the Montreal Gazette reported that MLS commissioner Don Garber and Montreal Impact president Joey Saputo have resumed talks for an expansion team to begin play in 2011. On May 7, 2010, it was officially announced by MLS commissioner Don Garber that Montreal had been granted the league's 19th franchise, and would begin play in the 2012 season. The MLS club retained the Montreal Impact name until 2021 when they rebranded as CF Montréal.

== Colours and badge ==
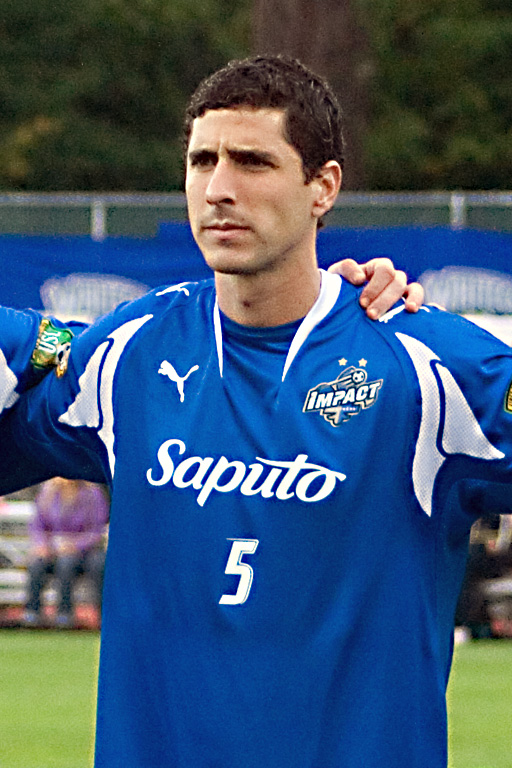
Final club captain Nevio Pizzolito (2008 image) in Impact colours.

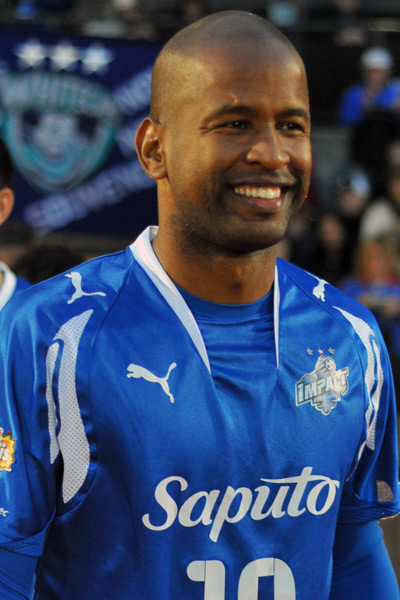
In their final years, Impact wore three stars: one for each league title (2009 image of Roberto Brown).

The team's colours were blue and white, and the team's logo featured a stylized fleur-de-lis in blue and silver, overlaid with the Impact wordmark and a traditional hex-stitched soccer ball in flight. The fleur-de-lis is a globally recognized symbol of French heritage, and features prominently on the flag of Quebec as a reflection of French-Canadian culture. The badge featured stars to represent the league titles it won. Titles won in 1994 and 2004 resulted in the addition of the first two stars. A third star was added after the club won the USL First Division in 2009.

== Stadium ==
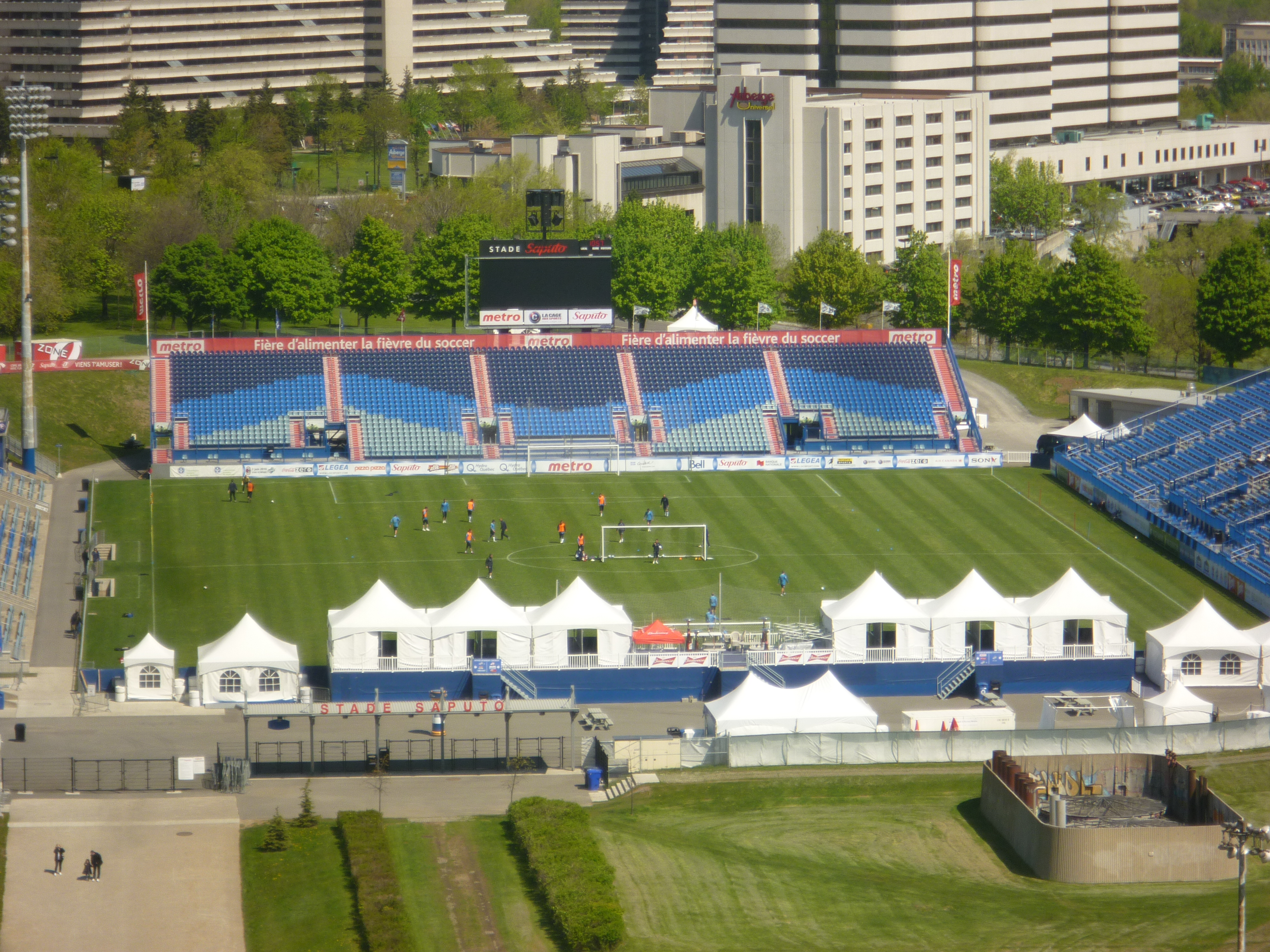
Stade Saputo, Impact's home stadium since 2008

- Complexe Sportif Claude-Robillard; Montreal, Quebec (1993–2007)
- Stadium at Université Laval; Quebec City, Quebec 3 games (2003–2005)
- Stadium at Université de Sherbrooke; Sherbrooke, Quebec 2 games (2004–2005)
- Saputo Stadium; Montreal, Quebec (2008–2011)

The Impact played its home games at Saputo Stadium, a soccer-specific stadium which opened in May 2008. As the name suggests, the stadium was funded privately (mainly by the Saputo family), and cost $14.1 million CAD to build, with one-half of the cost paid by the Saputo family, and the rest coming from other private-sector contributions. Saputo Stadium was also the Impact's administrative headquarters and also includes a training field, 20 corporate boxes and full player welfare areas.

Prior to its 2012 expansion, Saputo Stadium seated 13,034 supporters in three main stands, and was expanded to seat 20,341. It is located just east of Olympic Stadium in the city's east end. Prior to moving to the new stadium, the Impact played their home games at mainly Complexe Sportif Claude-Robillard, with a handful of games also being held in stadia on University campuses at Université Laval and Université de Sherbrooke.

== Club culture ==
=== Supporters ===
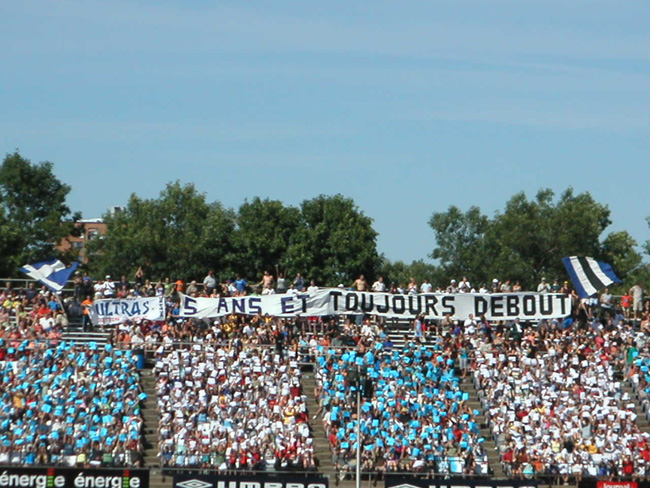
A card display mosaic tifo celebrating the UM02's 5th anniversary at Montreal's Claude-Robillard Centre.

The Montreal Impact had one of the most vocal groups of supporters in the USSF D-2, the UM02, which stands for Ultras Montréal 2002. The group was created in 2002, after the re-opening of the Montréal Impact, when a group of fans decided to bring organized and vocal support to Impact games. Since their start in 2002, the group had grown from a handful of friends to a group that regularly numbers in the hundreds. The largest number of people within the group was during the February 25 match against Santos Laguna. Their slogan is "Toujours Fidèles" which is French for "Always Faithful". The UM02 has a rivalry with the supporters of the Rochester Rhinos which was at that time the Rochester Stampede, as well as the organized support of rival Toronto FC. The UM02 were located in section 132 of Saputo Stadium, the designated supporters section before the stadium was reconfigured for MLS.

=== Rivalries ===
Montreal Impact had a rivalry with the Rochester Rhinos, when the two were in the USL's First Division. In games between the two franchises, it was not uncommon for supporters of the two teams to travel to the opposing sides' stadium.

The Impact also had a rivalry with MLS side Toronto FC. Toronto FC and Montreal Impact both participated in the Canadian Championship annually along with Vancouver. On June 18, 2009, the Impact suffered its worst defeat, losing 6–1 to Toronto FC. The lopsided loss by the Impact eliminated the Vancouver Whitecaps from the 2009 Canadian Championship, thus causing resentment among some Whitecaps fans towards the Impact. As a result, another chapter was added to the rivalry between the Whitecaps and the Impact.

== Broadcasting ==
The Montreal Impact had a French language television deal with Radio-Canada that ran through the 2011 season. Philippe Germain did the play-by-play and Guillaume Dumas was the colour commentator. Pre-game, post-game and half-time shows featured Marie-José Turcotte and former Impact star Gabriel Gervais.

CKGM (The Team 990) was the Impact's English language radio broadcaster. Brian Wilde handled the play-by-play while Noel Butler was the colour commentator. CKAC is the Impact's French language broadcaster with Jean-Philippe Bertrand is the play-by-play announcer, Francis Millien is the colour commentator and Jeremy Filosa reports from the sidelines.

== Players and staff ==
=== Final roster ===
as of September 25, 2011.

Note: Flags indicate national team as defined under FIFA eligibility rules; some limited exceptions apply. Players may hold more than one non-FIFA nationality.

No.	Pos.	Nation	Player
1	GK	PUR	Bill Gaudette
2	DF	MAR	Hicham Aâboubou
3	DF	NZL	Cameron Knowles
5	DF	CAN	Nevio Pizzolitto (captain)
6	MF	FRA	Hassoun Camara
7	MF	USA	David Testo
8	MF	USA	Luke Kreamalmeyer
10	FW	CAN	Ali Gerba
11	MF	ARG	Leonardo Di Lorenzo
12	DF	USA	Amir Lowery
14	FW	SEN	Mignane Diouf (on loan from Diambars)
15	FW	COL	Miguel Montaño (on loan from Seattle Sounders FC)
16	FW	CUB	Eduardo Sebrango
17	MF	FRA	Anthony Le Gall

No.	Pos.	Nation	Player
18	FW	CAN	Marco Terminesi
19	FW	CAN	Reda Agourram
7	MF	USA	David Testo
21	DF	FRA	Philippe Billy
22	GK	USA	Evan Bush
23	MF	CAN	António Ribeiro
24	DF	CAN	Simon Gatti
25	GK	CAN	Greg Sutton (on loan from New York Red Bulls)
27	MF	ENG	Ian Westlake
28	MF	BIH	Siniša Ubiparipović
30	MF	CAN	Pierre-Rudolph Mayard
32	MF	USA	Ryan Pore (on loan from Portland Timbers)
33	FW	ROU	Mircea Ilcu
35	MF	CAN	Wandrille Lefevre

=== Staff ===
- (Canada) Joey Saputo – President
- (Canada) Richard Legendre – Executive Vice President, Montreal Impact & Saputo Stadium
- (Canada) Claude Pinard – Executive Vice President, Marketing & Sales
- (Canada) John Di Terlizzi – Vice President, Sales
- (Canada) John Papadakis – Vice President, Finances
- (Canada) Nick De Santis – Sporting Director and Head Coach
- (United States) Matt Jordan – Director of Soccer Operations
- (Canada) Mauro Biello – Assistant Coach
- (Spain) Gil Orriols Jansana – Assistant Coach
- (Morocco) Youssef Dahha – Goalkeeper Coach
- (Canada) Adam Braz – Team Manager
- (Canada) Dr. Scott Delaney – Team Physician

=== Retired numbers ===
No.	Name	Years
20	(Canada) Mauro Biello	1993–1998, 2000–2009

=== Head coaches ===
- (Italy) Eddie Firmani (1993)
- (Canada) Valerio Gazzola (1994–1997)
- (England) Paul Kitson (1998)
- (Canada) Tasso Koutsoukos (1998–2000)
- (Canada) Zoran Jankovic (2000)
- (Canada) Valerio Gazzola (2000–2001)
- (United States) Bob Lilley (2002–2003)
- (Canada) John Limniatis (2008–2009)
- (Canada) Marc Dos Santos (2009–2011)
- (Canada) Nick DeSantis (2001, 2004–2008, 2011)

== Achievements ==
- USL First Division
  - Winners (2): 2004, 2009
  - Northeast Division Champions (2): 1997, 2003
  - Eastern Division Champions (2): 2004
- APSL
  - Winners (1): 1994
- Commissioner's Cup
  - Winners (5): 1995, 1996, 1997, 2005, 2006
  - Runners-up (2): 2003, 2004
- Voyageurs Cup
  - Winners (7): 2002, 2003, 2004, 2005, 2006, 2007, 2008
- Can Am Cup
  - Winners (3): 1998, 2003, 2004
- Montreal Cup
  - Winners (1): 2001

== Record ==
=== Year-by-year ===
This is a complete list of seasons for the USL/NASL franchise. For a season-by-season history including the successor Montreal Impact MLS franchise, see List of Montreal Impact seasons.

==== Outdoor team ====
Season	League											Position		Playoffs	VC / CC	Continental		Average attendance	Top goal scorer	
Season	Div	League	Pld	W	L	D	GF	GA	GD	Pts	PPG	Conf.	Overall	Playoffs	VC / CC	Continental		Average attendance	Name	Goals
1993	2	APSL	24	11	13	0	28	33	–5	33	1.38	N/A	7th	DNQ	–	Ineligible		–	(Canada) Grant Needham	6
1994	2	APSL	20	12	8	0	27	18	+9	36	1.80	N/A	3rd	W	–	Ineligible		3,216	(United States) Jean Harbor	10
1995	2	A-League	24	17	7	0	47	27	+20	51	2.13	N/A	1st	SF	–	Ineligible		5,075	(Jamaica) Lloyd Barker	12
1996	2	A-League	27	21	6	0	40	18	+22	55	2.04	N/A	1st	SF	–	Ineligible		4,868	(Canada) Eddy Berdusco	9
1997	2	A-League	28	21	7	0	58	19	+39	61	2.18	1st	1st	QF	–	Ineligible		5,066	(England) Darren Tilley	16
1998	2	A-League	28	21	7	0	47	33	+14	47	1.68	4th	9th	QF	–	Ineligible		4,008	(Canada) Mauro Biello	11
1999	On Hiatus																			
2000	2	A-League	28	12	13	3	34	41	–7	39	1.39	10th	17th	DNQ	–	Ineligible		2,338	Unknown	X
2001	2	A-League	26	10	14	2	29	37	–8	32	1.23	4th	14th	DNQ	–	Ineligible		2,103	Unknown	X
2002	2	A-League	28	16	9	3	39	29	+10	51	1.82	3rd	5th	QF	W	Ineligible		5,178	(Cuba) Eduardo Sebrango	19
2003	2	A-League	28	16	6	6	40	21	+19	54	1.93	1st	2nd	QF	W	Ineligible		7,236	Unknown	X
2004	2	A-League	28	17	6	5	36	15	+21	56	2.00	1st	2nd	W	W	Ineligible		9,279	Unknown	X
2005	2	USL-1	28	18	3	7	37	15	+22	61	2.18	N/A	1st	SF	W	Ineligible		11,176	Unknown	X
2006	2	USL-1	28	14	5	9	31	15	+16	51	1.82	N/A	1st	SF	W	Ineligible		11,554	Unknown	X
2007	2	USL-1	28	14	6	8	32	21	+11	50	1.79	N/A	3rd	QF	W	Ineligible		11,035	Unknown	X
2008	2	USL-1	30	12	12	6	33	28	+5	42	1.40	N/A	3rd	SF	W	CONCACAF Champions League	QF	12,696	Unknown	X
2009	2	USL-1	30	12	11	7	32	31	+1	43	1.43	N/A	5th	W	3rd	DNQ		12,033	Unknown	X
2010	2	D2 Pro	30	12	11	7	36	30	+6	43	1.43	3rd	6th	SF	3rd	DNQ		12,397	(Canada) Ali Gerba	13
2011	2	NASL	28	9	11	8	35	27	+8	35	1.25	N/A	7th	DNQ	SF	DNQ		11,514	(United States) Ryan Pore	7
Total	–	–	491	265	155	71	661	458	+203	840	1.71	–	–	–	–	–		–	(Canada) Mauro Biello	77

1. Avg. attendance include statistics from league matches only.
2. Top goal scorer includes all goals scored in league, league playoffs, Canadian Championship, CONCACAF Champions League, FIFA Club World Cup, and other competitive continental matches.
3. Points and PPG have been adjusted from non-traditional to traditional scoring systems for seasons prior to 2003 to more effectively compare historical team performance across seasons.

==== Indoor team ====
Season	League							Position		Playoffs	Average attendance	Top goal scorer	
Season	League	Pld	W	L	PF	PA	PD	Conf.	Overall	Playoffs	Average attendance	Name	Goals
1997–98	NPSL	40	16	24	455	518	–63	6th	10th	DNQ	4,629	(Canada) Mauro Biello	34
1998–99	NPSL	40	19	21	439	437	+2	5th	8th	QF	3,114	(Canada) Mauro Biello	53
1999–00	NPSL	44	24	20	568	577	–9	4th	6th	QF	2,642	(Canada) Domenic Mobilio	64
Total	–	124	59	65	1,462	1,532	–70	–	–	–	–	Unknown	X

=== Historical stats ===
Seasons: 18 (1993–1998, 2000–2011)

First Official Game: May 14, 1993 (against the Los Angeles Salsa)

First Game: April 22, 1993 (against Ponte Boggianese, Italy)

First Home Game: May 21, 1993 (against the Tampa Bay Rowdies)

Best Finish: Champion (1994, 2004, 2009)

Titles: 3 (1994, 2004, 2009)

Voyageurs Cup: 7 (2002, 2003, 2004, 2005, 2006, 2007, 2008)

Attendance record: 55 571 spectators (February 25, 2009, against the Santos Laguna CONCACAF)

Most Goals Scored: 58 (in 28 matches in 1997)

Fewest Goals Allowed: 15 (in 28 matches in 2004, 2005 and 2006)

Largest Victory (h): 6–0 (against Worcester in 1997)

Largest Victory (a): 0–5 (against Crystal Palace Baltimore in 2010)

Worst Defeat (h): 1–6 (against Toronto FC in 2009)

Worst Defeat (a): 6–0 (against Rochester in 1998)

CONCACAF Champions League: First Canadian participant in 2008, reached quarterfinals

Most goals in a game: Ali Gerba 3 goals August 21, 2010 (against Crystal Palace Baltimore)

Earliest goal at the start of a game : Ali Gerba 18 seconds August 27, 2010 (against Rochester Rhinos)

=== Awards year-by-year ===
Year	MVP	Defensive Player of the Year	Unsung Hero	Newcomer of the Year
1993	(Canada) Patrice Ferri	–	–	–
1994	(United States) Jean Harbor	–	–	–
1995	(Jamaica) Lloyd Barker	–	–	–
1996	(Canada) Paolo Ceccarelli	–	–	–
1997	(Canada) Mauro Biello	–	–	(Northern Ireland) Tommy Moreland
1998	(Canada) Mauro Biello	(Northern Ireland) Tommy Moreland	–	–
1999	N/A	–	–	–
2000	(Canada) Jim Larkin	–	–	–
2001	(Canada) Mauro Biello	–	–	–
2002	(Cuba) Eduardo Sebrango	(Canada) Gabriel Gervais	(Canada) Jason DiTullio	(Brazil) Zé Roberto
2003	(Canada) Greg Sutton	(Canada) Gabriel Gervais	(Canada) David Fronimadis	(Canada) Martin Nash
2004	(Canada) Gabriel Gervais	(Canada) Greg Sutton	(Brazil) Zé Roberto	(Canada) Sandro Grande
2005	(Canada) Mauro Biello	(Canada) Nevio Pizzolitto	(Argentina) Mauricio Vincello	(Japan) Masahiro Fukazawa
2006	(Argentina) Mauricio Vincello	(Canada) Gabriel Gervais	(United States) Andrew Weber	(Argentina) Leonardo Di Lorenzo
2007	(Argentina) Leonardo Di Lorenzo	(Argentina) Mauricio Vincello	(Canada) Simon Gatti	(United States) Matt Jordan
2008	(United States) Matt Jordan	(Canada) Nevio Pizzolitto	(United States) Joey Gjertsen	(Italy) Stefano Pesoli
2009	(United States) David Testo	(Canada) Nevio Pizzolitto	(Canada) Adam Braz	(Jamaica) Stephen deRoux
2010	(France) Philippe Billy	(France) Philippe Billy	(United States) Tony Donatelli	(Canada) Ali Gerba
2011	(France) Hassoun Camara	(United States) Evan Bush	(Canada) Simon Gatti	(England) Ian Westlake / (Bosnia and Herzegovina) Sinisa Ubiparipovic

=== All-time leaders ===
Most appearances
#	Name	Career	Appear.	Goals
1	(Canada) Mauro Biello	1993–98, 2000–2009	344	72
2	(Canada) Nevio Pizzolito	1995–98, 2000–2012	283	11
3	(Canada) Patrick Leduc	2000–2010	222	10
4	(Canada) Nick De Santis	1993–2003	219	21
5	(Jamaica) Lloyd Barker	1993–98, 2000–01	191	34
6	(Canada) Patrick Diotte	1993–98, 2000–01	186	0
7	(Canada) John Limniatis	1990–2002	150	2
8	(Canada) Gabriel Gervais	2002–08	148	7
9	(Canada) Adam Braz	2002–06, 2008–	145	0
10	(Canada) António Ribeiro	2000–08, 2010–	144	12

Most goals scored
#	Name	Career	Appear.	Goals
1	(Canada) Mauro Biello	1993–98, 2000–2009	344	72
2	(Cuba) Eduardo Sebrango	2002–05, 2009–	136	50
3	(Jamaica) Lloyd Barker	1993–97, 2001–04	190	34
4	(Canada) Ali Gerba	2000, 2003, 2005, 2010–	49	23
5	(Canada) Nick De Santis	1993–98, 2000–03	219	21
6	(Canada) Grant Needham	1993–98	87	19
7	(Canada) Guiliano Oliviero	1997–2002	115	18
T8	(Serbia) Darko Kolić	1997–98, 2000–06	105	17
T8	(Brazil) Zé Roberto	2001–07	138	17
T10	(Panama) Roberto Brown	2007–2010	59	13
T10	(Canada) Charles Gbeke	2005, 2007–2008	49	13
T10	(United States) Tony Donatelli	2008–2010	73	13

=== All-time continental competition win/loss ===
Last updated March 22, 2010

Club	Pld	W	D	L	GF	GA	GD
(Mexico) Atlante F.C.	2	0	1	1	1	2	−1
(Trinidad and Tobago) Joe Public F.C.	2	2	0	0	6	1	5
(Honduras) Olimpia	2	1	1	0	3	2	1
(Nicaragua) Real Estelí	2	1	1	0	1	0	1
(Mexico) Santos Laguna	2	1	0	1	4	5	−1
Total	10	5	3	2	15	10	5

== See also ==
- Montreal Manic
- Montreal Olympique
- Montreal Supra
- CF Montreal
- Philadelphia Fury (1978–80)
