= 2009 Toronto FC season =

Toronto FC 2009 soccer season

Toronto FC
2009 season
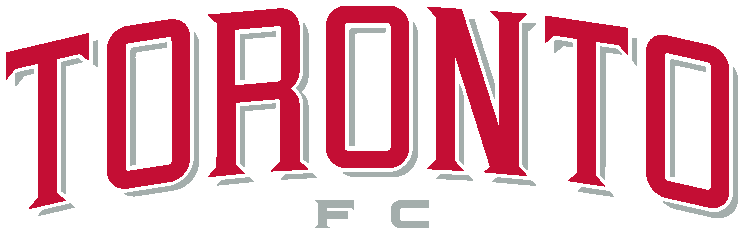
- Head coach: Chris Cummins
- Stadium: BMO Field
- Major League Soccer: Conference: 5th Overall: 12th
- MLS Cup playoffs: Did not qualify
- Canadian Championship: Winners
- CONCACAF Champions League: Preliminary round
- Top goalscorer: League: Dwayne De Rosario (11); All: Dwayne De Rosario (14)
- Highest home attendance: League: 20,902; All: 20,902
- Average home league attendance: League: 20,344; All: 20,312
Home colours	Away colours

The 2009 Toronto FC season was the third season in Toronto FC's existence. The club narrowly missed their first appearance for the MLS Cup playoffs, losing the last game of the season when a win would have meant qualification.

== Club ==
=== Management ===
Position	Staff
Manager, Director of Soccer	(Scotland) Mo Johnston
Head Coach	(England) Chris Cummins
Strength and Conditioning Coach	(England) Paul Winsper
First Assistant Coach	(Canada) Nick Dasovic
Goalkeeping Coach	(Canada) Mike Toshack
Video Analyst	(Republic of Ireland) Eddie Kehoe
Equipment Manager	(England) Malcolm Phillips
Athletic Therapist	(Canada) Carmelo Lobue
Assistant Athletic Therapist	(Canada) Shawn Jeffers
Massage Therapist	(Canada) Marcelo Casal
Team Physician	(Canada) Dr. Ira Smith
Manager Team Services	(Canada) Earl Cochrane

Last updated: May 23, 2009
Source: Toronto FC

=== Kits ===
Home	Away	Special

Type	Shirt	Shorts	Socks	First appearance / Info
Home	Red	Red	Red	
Away	Grey	Black	Grey	
Special	Pink	Black	Black	MLS, June 24 against New York

== Squad ==
As of September 9, 2009.

Note: Flags indicate national team as defined under FIFA eligibility rules; some limited exceptions apply. Players may hold more than one non-FIFA nationality.

No.	Pos.	Nation	Player
2	MF	USA	Sam Cronin
3	DF	CAN	Nana Attakora
4	DF	USA	Nick Garcia
5	DF	HAI	Lesly Fellinga
6	MF	CAN	Julian de Guzman
7	FW	USA	Fuad Ibrahim
8	FW	ARG	Pablo Vitti (on loan from Independiente)
10	FW	CAN	Ali Gerba
11	DF	CAN	Jim Brennan (captain)
14	MF	CAN	Dwayne De Rosario
15	DF	CAN	Adrian Serioux

No.	Pos.	Nation	Player
16	DF	USA	Marvell Wynne
17	FW	JAM	O'Brian White
18	GK	USA	Brian Edwards
19	FW	USA	Chad Barrett
20	MF	HON	Amado Guevara
22	MF	GAM	Amadou Sanyang
24	GK	SUI	Stefan Frei
27	MF	CAN	Gabe Gala
32	DF	GAM	Emmanuel Gómez
33	MF	WAL	Carl Robinson (vice-captain)

=== Transfers ===
==== In ====
Note: Flags indicate national team as defined under FIFA eligibility rules; some limited exceptions apply. Players may hold more than one non-FIFA nationality.

No.	Pos.	Nation	Player
14	MF	CAN	Dwayne De Rosario (from Houston Dynamo, Trade)
2	MF	USA	Sam Cronin (1st round (2nd overall) pick in 2009 MLS Superdraft)
17	FW	JAM	O'Brian White (1st round (4th overall) pick in 2009 MLS Superdraft)
24	GK	SUI	Stefan Frei (1st round (12th overall) pick in 2009 MLS Superdraft)
8	FW	ARG	Pablo Vitti (from Independiente, Loan)
15	DF	CAN	Adrian Serioux (from FC Dallas, Trade)

No.	Pos.	Nation	Player
22	MF	GAM	Amadou Sanyang (from Real de Banjul Football Club,)
32	DF	GAM	Emmanuel Gomez (from Samger Football Club,)
4	DF	USA	Nick Garcia (from San Jose Earthquakes, Trade)
10	FW	CAN	Ali Gerba (Unattached)
5	DF	HAI	Lesly Fellinga (Unattached)
6	MF	CAN	Julian de Guzman (Unattached)

==== Out ====
Note: Flags indicate national team as defined under FIFA eligibility rules; some limited exceptions apply. Players may hold more than one non-FIFA nationality.

No.	Pos.	Nation	Player
23	FW	NZL	Jarrod Smith (to Seattle Sounders FC, 2009 Expansion Draft)
3	DF	TTO	Julius James (to Houston Dynamo, Trade)
2	DF	USA	Hunter Freeman (to Start, Free Transfer)
25	FW	GUA	Carlos Ruiz (Waived)
17	MF	CAN	Joey Melo (Waived)
26	FW	CAN	Derek Gaudet (Waived)
36	MF	BER	Kilian Elkinson (Waived)
15	MF	CAN	Tyler Rosenlund (Waived)

No.	Pos.	Nation	Player
12	DF	USA	Todd Dunivant (to LA Galaxy, Trade)
14	DF	JAM	Tyrone Marshall (to Seattle Sounders FC, Trade)
1	GK	CAN	Greg Sutton (Waived)
13	MF	USA	Johann Smith (Waived)
10	MF	ENG	Rohan Ricketts (Released)
5	MF	CAN	Kevin Harmse (to Chivas USA, Trade)
4	DF	PUR	Marco Vélez (Released)
9	FW	ENG	Danny Dichio (Retired)

== Competitions ==
Updated to games played October 24, 2009.

=== Regular season ===
==== Standings ====
Pos	Team	Pld	W	L	T	GF	GA	GD	Pts	Qualification
1	Columbus Crew	30	13	7	10	41	31	+10	49	Qualification for the conference semifinals
2	Chicago Fire	30	11	7	12	39	34	+5	45	Qualification for the conference semifinals
3	New England Revolution	30	11	10	9	33	37	−4	42	Qualification for the conference semifinals
4	D.C. United	30	9	8	13	43	44	−1	40	
5	Toronto FC	30	10	11	9	37	46	−9	39	
6	Kansas City Wizards	30	8	13	9	33	42	−9	33	
7	New York Red Bulls	30	5	19	6	27	47	−20	21	

Source: MLS

Pos	Team	Pld	W	L	T	GF	GA	GD	Pts	
1	Columbus Crew (S)	30	13	7	10	41	31	+10	49	Qualification for the CONCACAF Champions League
2	LA Galaxy	30	12	6	12	36	31	+5	48	Qualification for the CONCACAF Champions League
3	Houston Dynamo	30	13	8	9	39	29	+10	48	Qualification for the North American SuperLiga
4	Seattle Sounders FC (U)	30	12	7	11	38	29	+9	47	Qualification for the CONCACAF Champions League
5	Chicago Fire	30	11	7	12	39	34	+5	45	Qualification for the North American SuperLiga
6	Chivas USA	30	13	11	6	34	31	+3	45	Qualification for the North American SuperLiga
7	New England Revolution	30	11	10	9	33	37	−4	42	Qualification for the North American SuperLiga
8	Real Salt Lake (C)	30	11	12	7	43	35	+8	40	Qualification for the CONCACAF Champions League
9	Colorado Rapids	30	10	10	10	42	38	+4	40	
10	D.C. United	30	9	8	13	43	44	−1	40	
11	FC Dallas	30	11	13	6	50	47	+3	39	
12	Toronto FC (V)	30	10	11	9	37	46	−9	39	Qualification for the CONCACAF Champions League
13	Kansas City Wizards	30	8	13	9	33	42	−9	33	
14	San Jose Earthquakes	30	7	14	9	36	50	−14	30	
15	New York Red Bulls	30	5	19	6	27	47	−20	21	

Source: MLS
Rules for classification: 1) points; 2) head-to-head record; 3) goal difference; 4) number of goals scored
(C) MLS Cup champions; (S) Supporters' Shield winners; (U) U.S. Open Cup winners; (V) Canadian Championship winners

==== Results summary ====
Overall								Home						Away					
Pld	Pts	W	L	T	GF	GA	GD	W	L	T	GF	GA	GD	W	L	T	GF	GA	GD
30	39	10	11	9	37	46	−9	8	3	4	20	14	+6	2	8	5	17	32	−15

Last updated: October 24, 2009
Source: 2009 Major League Soccer season
Pld = Matches played; Pts = Points; W = Matches won; T = Matches tied; L = Matches lost; GF = Goals for; GA = Goals against; GD = Goal difference

==== Results by round ====
Round	1	2	3	4	5	6	7	8	9	10	11	12	13	14	15	16	17	18	19	20	21	22	23	24	25	26	27	28	29	30
Ground	A	A	H	H	A	H	H	H	A	H	H	A	H	H	H	A	A	H	A	A	H	A	A	A	H	A	A	H	H	A
Result	W	T	L	T	L	W	W	T	T	L	W	L	L	W	W	L	W	T	L	T	W	L	T	L	W	L	T	T	W	L

Updated to match(es) played on October 24, 2009. Source: Regular season matches
A = Away; H = Home; W = Win; L = Loss; T = Tie

== Matches ==
=== Pre-season ===
Win Tie Loss

February 8, 2009	Toronto FC	2–1	United States U-20	Bradenton, Florida USA
	Barrett; McGlinchey

February 10, 2009	Toronto FC	0–1	Chicago Fire	Bradenton, Florida USA

February 13, 2009	Toronto FC	2–1	New York Red Bulls	Bradenton, Florida USA
	Vitti; Barrett

February 13, 2009	Toronto FC	0–1	New York Red Bulls	Bradenton, Florida USA

February 21, 2009	Toronto FC	3–0	Florida Atlantic University	Sunrise, Florida USA
	Cronin; Dichio

February 23, 2009	Toronto FC	3–0	Häcken	Sunrise, Florida USA
	Robinson; Vitti; De Rosario

==== Carolina Challenge Cup 2009 ====
March 7, 2009	Toronto FC	2–1	Charleston Battery	Charleston, South Carolina USA
	De Rosario 2'; Ricketts 82'		Hemming 13' (pen.)	Stadium: Blackbaud Stadium

March 11, 2009	Toronto FC	2–1	D.C. United	Charleston, South Carolina USA
	Barrett 21'; De Rosario 35'		Pontius 48'	Stadium: Blackbaud Stadium

March 14, 2009	Toronto FC	1–2	Real Salt Lake	Charleston, South Carolina USA
	De Rosario 38'		Movsisyan 5'; Mathis 20'	Stadium: Blackbaud Stadium

=== 2009 Major League Soccer season ===
March 21, 2009	Kansas City Wizards	2–3	Toronto FC	Kansas City, Kansas, USA
	Jewsbury (yellow card) 39'; Arnaud 56', 76'	(report)	Brennan 33'; Rickets (yellow card) 45+1'; Guevara 53', 62'	Stadium: CommunityAmerica Ballpark; Attendance: 10,385; Referee: Jorge Gonzalez

March 28, 2009	Columbus Crew	1–1	Toronto FC	Columbus, Ohio, USA
	Barros Schelotto 30'	(report)	Padula 84' (o.g.)	Stadium: Columbus Crew Stadium; Attendance: 14,686; Referee: Michael Kennedy

April 4, 2009	Toronto FC	0–2	Seattle Sounders FC	Toronto
	Brennan (yellow card) 44'; Cronin (yellow card) 51'	Report	Ljungberg 15'; Hurtado (yellow card) 29'; Zakuani 45'; Riley (yellow card) 61'; Scott (yellow card) 86'	Stadium: BMO Field; Attendance: 20,658; Referee: Mark Geiger

April 11, 2009	Toronto FC	1–1	FC Dallas	Toronto
	De Rosario 17'; Dichio (yellow card) 82'; Brennan (yellow card) 89'	(report)	Cunningham (yellow card) 80'; Ricchetti 87'	Stadium: BMO Field; Attendance: 20,272; Referee: Terry Vaughn

April 19, 2009	FC Dallas	3–2	Toronto FC	Frisco, Texas, USA
	Moor 25'; Cooper 44', 84' (pen.)	(report)	Serioux 46+'; Barrett 59', 70'	Stadium: Pizza Hut Park; Attendance: 6,183; Referee: Tim Weyland

April 22, 2009	Toronto FC	1–0	Chivas USA	Toronto
	Guevara 36'; Dichio (yellow card) 38'	(report)	Eskandarian (yellow card) 57'; Kljestan (yellow card) 79'	Stadium: BMO Field; Attendance: 19,915; Referee: Ricardo Salazar

April 26, 2009	Toronto FC	1–0	Kansas City Wizards	Toronto
	Vitti (yellow card) 52'; Dichio 54'	(report)	Arnaud (yellow card) 76'	Stadium: BMO Field; Attendance: 20,056; Referee: Paul Ward

May 2, 2009	Toronto FC	1–1	Columbus Crew	Toronto
	Brennan (yellow card) 40'; Barrett (yellow card) 52', (goal) 64'	(report)	Barros Schelotto (yellow card) 10'; Ekpo 54'; O'Rourke (yellow card) 57'; Gaven (yellow card) 83'	Stadium: BMO Field; Attendance: 19,998; Referee: Kevin Stott

May 9, 2009	D.C. United	3–3	Toronto FC	Washington, D.C. USA
	N'Silu 9'; Fred (yellow card) 40'; Pontius 86', (yellow card) 90+4'; Moreno 90+2' (pen.)	(report)	De Rosario 52', 87', (yellow card) 90+4'; Serioux 63'; Brennan (yellow card) 90+2'	Stadium: RFK Memorial Stadium; Attendance: 15,652; Referee: Baldomero Toledo

May 16, 2009	Toronto FC	0–2	Chicago Fire	Toronto
		(report)	Rolfe 59'; Busch (yellow card) 77'; McBride 81'	Stadium: BMO Field; Attendance: 20,006; Referee: Ricardo Salazar

May 23, 2009	Toronto FC	3–1	New England Revolution	Toronto
	Guevara 14', 70', (yellow card) 80'; De Rosario 68'	(report)	Joseph 13'; Thompson (yellow card) 69'; Ralston (yellow card) 81'	Stadium: BMO Field; Attendance: 20,478; Referee: Michael Kennedy

May 30, 2009	Houston Dynamo	3–0	Toronto FC	Houston, Texas, USA
	Davis 19'; Kamara 22'; Holden 24'; Hainault (yellow card) 39'	(report)	Serioux (yellow card) 19'; Guevara (yellow card) 90+2'	Stadium: Robertson Stadium; Attendance: 16,037; Referee: Yader Reyes

June 6, 2009	Toronto FC	1–2	LA Galaxy	Toronto
	Harmse (yellow card) 44'; Dichio 64'	(report)	Gordon 5'; Gonzalez (yellow card) 9'; Sanneh (yellow card) 31'; Buddle 77'	Stadium: BMO Field; Attendance: 20,753; Referee: Alex Prus

June 13, 2009	Toronto FC	2–1	New York Red Bulls	Toronto
	Cronin 3'; Robinson (yellow card) 31'; Dichio 43'; Serioux (yellow card) 44'; Harmse (yellow card) 88'	(report)	Celades 54'; Petke (yellow card) 96+'	Stadium: BMO Field; Attendance: 19,843; Referee: Jair Marrufo

June 24, 2009	Toronto FC	2–0	New York Red Bulls	Toronto
	Vitti 28'; Robinson (yellow card) 41'; De Rosario 59', (yellow card) 76'	(report)	Richards (yellow card) 78'	Stadium: BMO Field; Attendance: 20,902; Referee: Baldomero Toledo

June 27, 2009	Real Salt Lake	3–0	Toronto FC	Sandy, Utah, USA
	Movsisyan 21'; Beckerman 44'; Mathis 78'	(report)	Barrett (yellow card) 46+'; Brennan (yellow card) 51'; Vitti (yellow card) 61'; Serioux (yellow card) 65'	Stadium: Rio Tinto Stadium; Attendance: 18,188; Referee: Edvin Jurisevic

July 11, 2009	San Jose Earthquakes	1–3	Toronto FC	Santa Clara, California, USA
	Huckerby 32'; Álvarez (yellow card) 53'	(report)	Barrett 5', 69'; Vitti 54'; De Rosario (yellow card) 84'	Stadium: Buck Shaw Stadium; Attendance: 9,679; Referee: Abiodun Okulaja

July 18, 2009	Toronto FC	1–1	Houston Dynamo	Toronto
	De Rosario 37'; Vitti (yellow card) 24'; Garcia (yellow card) 55'	(report)	Boswell 75'; Kamara (yellow card) 48'; Chabala (yellow card) 68'	Stadium: BMO Field; Attendance: 20,172; Referee: Kevin Stott

July 25, 2009	Columbus Crew	3–2	Toronto FC	Columbus, Ohio, USA
	Carroll (yellow card) 29'; Gaven 32'; Padula (yellow card) 39'; Lenhart 76'; Garey 92+'	(report)	Robinson (yellow card) 27'; De Rosario 35'; Gerba 49'; Vélez (yellow card) 78'	Stadium: Columbus Crew Stadium; Attendance: 13,775; Referee: Alex Prus

August 1, 2009	New England Revolution	1–1	Toronto FC	Foxborough, Massachusetts USA
	Jankauskas 76'; Videira (yellow card) 90+2'	(report)	Gerba (yellow card) 12'; De Rosario 34'; Barrett (yellow card) 36' (yellow-red card) 50'; Serioux (yellow card) 59'; Frei (yellow card) 90+3'	Stadium: Gillette Stadium; Attendance: 12,014; Referee: Terry Vaughn (referee)

August 15, 2009	Toronto FC	2–0	D.C. United	Toronto
	Cronin (yellow card) 17'; Robinson (yellow card) 24'; De Rosario 30'; Sanyang (yellow card) 45'; Brennan (yellow card) 58'; White 66'	(report)	Jakovic (yellow card) 22'; Simms (yellow card) 72'	Stadium: BMO Field; Attendance: 20,638; Referee: Alex Prus

August 22, 2009	Chivas USA	2–0	Toronto FC	Carson, California, USA
	Kljestan 32', 51'	(report)	White (yellow card) 25'; Robinson (yellow card) 33'; Serioux (yellow card) 59'	Stadium: The Home Depot Center; Attendance: 15,165; Referee: Hilario Grajeda

August 29, 2009	Seattle Sounders FC	0–0	Toronto FC	Seattle, Washington, USA
	Ljungberg (yellow card) 73'	(report)	Attakora (yellow card) 41'; Gómez (yellow card) 67'; De Rosario (yellow card) 73'	Stadium: Qwest Field; Attendance: 32,679; Referee: Jorge Gonzalez

September 5, 2009	Colorado Rapids	1–0	Toronto FC	Commerce City, Colorado, USA
	Casey 51'; Holody (yellow card) 84'	(report)	Sanyang (yellow card) 21' (yellow-red card) 76'; Serioux (red card) 84'	Stadium: Dick's Sporting Goods Park; Attendance: 10,821; Referee: Terry Vaughn

September 12, 2009	Toronto FC	3–2	Colorado Rapids	Toronto
	De Rosario 19'; Attakora (yellow card) 21'; Barrett (yellow card) 67'; White 71'; Attakora 74'	(report)	Casey 49'; Holody 89'	Stadium: BMO Field; Attendance: 20,521; Referee: Baldomero Toledo

September 19, 2009	LA Galaxy	2–0	Toronto FC	Carson, California, USA
	Beckham 9', (yellow card) 64'; Buddle 83'	(report)	De Guzman (yellow card) 24'; Guevara (yellow card) 64'; Garcia (yellow card) 67'	Stadium: The Home Depot Center; Attendance: 18,619; Referee: Kevin Stott

September 26, 2009	Chicago Fire	2–2	Toronto FC	Bridgeview, Illinois, USA
	Garcia 14' (o.g.); Prideaux (yellow card) 61'; McBride 78'	(report)	De Rosario 6'; Wynne (yellow card) 25'; Barrett 46'; Robinson (yellow card) 81'	Stadium: Toyota Park; Attendance: 16,890; Referee: Edvin Jurisevic

October 10, 2009	Toronto FC	1–1	San Jose Earthquakes	Toronto
	Attakora 47'; Serioux (yellow card) 69'; Brennan (yellow card) 90'; De Rosario (yellow card) 90+5'	(report)	Amarikwa (yellow card) 74'; Glen 90+3'	Stadium: BMO Field; Attendance: 20,571; Referee: Mark Geiger

October 17, 2009	Toronto FC	1–0	Real Salt Lake	Toronto
	Brennan (yellow card) 19', (goal) 48'	(report)	Beltran (yellow card) 39'; Beckerman (yellow card) 55'	Stadium: BMO Field; Attendance: 20,384; Referee: Terry Vaughn

October 24, 2009	New York Red Bulls	5–0	Toronto FC	East Rutherford, New Jersey, USA
	Kandji 3', 70'; Ángel 33', 62'; Mbuta 90+4' (pen.)	(results)	White (yellow card) 60'	Stadium: Giants Stadium; Attendance: 21,305; Referee: Alex Prus

=== Canadian Championship ===
Pos	Team	Pld	W	D	L	GF	GA	GD	Pts	Qualification
1	Toronto FC (C)	4	3	0	1	8	3	+5	9	Champions League
2	Vancouver Whitecaps	4	3	0	1	5	1	+4	9	
3	Montreal Impact	4	0	0	4	1	10	−9	0	

Source: Canada Soccer
Rules for classification: 1) points; 2) points in matches between drawn teams; 3) goal differential; 4) number of goals scored; 5) drawing of lots.
(C) Champions

May 6, 2009	Toronto FC	1–0	Vancouver Whitecaps	Toronto
	Harmse 3', (yellow card) 63'; De Rosario (yellow card) 56'; Dichio (yellow card) 93+'	(report)	Gbeke (yellow card) 25'; Moose (yellow card) 49'; Charles (yellow card) 63'	Stadium: BMO Field; Attendance: 19,811; Referee: Silviu Petrescu

May 13, 2009	Toronto FC	1–0	Montreal Impact	Toronto
	Barrett 35'; Vélez (yellow card) 69'	(report)	Testo (yellow card) 22' (red card) 71'; Pizzolitto (yellow card) 45'	Stadium: BMO Field; Attendance: 19,872; Referee: Mauricio Navarro

June 2, 2009	Vancouver Whitecaps	2–0	Toronto FC	Burnaby, British Columbia, Canada
	Toure 31', 81'	(report)	Brennan (yellow card) 56'; Harmse (yellow card) 63'	Stadium: Swangard Stadium; Attendance: 5,688; Referee: Carol-Anne Chenard

June 18, 2009	Montreal Impact	1–6	Toronto FC	Montreal, Quebec, Canada
	Donatelli 24' (pen.); Testo (yellow card) 47'; Placentino (yellow card) 71'	(report)	De Rosario 29', 39', 49'; Garcia (yellow card) 42'; Robinson (yellow card) 63'; Guevara 69', 90'; Barrett 83'	Stadium: Saputo Stadium; Attendance: 11,561; Referee: Carol-Anne Chenard

=== CONCACAF Champions League 2009-10 ===
==== Preliminary round ====
July 29, 2009	Toronto FC (Canada)	0–1	Puerto Rico Islanders	Toronto, Ontario Canada
	Robinson (yellow card) 86'	(report)	Jagdeosingh 67'; Gaudette (yellow card) 80'; Jones (yellow card) 90+2'	Stadium: BMO Field; Attendance: 20,758; Referee: Hugo Cruz

August 4, 2009	Puerto Rico Islanders	0–0	(Canada) Toronto FC	Bayamón, Puerto Rico
	Jagdeosingh (red card) 88'	(report)		Stadium: Juan Ramón Loubriel Stadium; Attendance: 6,000; Referee: Goffrey Hospedales

=== Friendlies ===
May 26, 2009	Toronto FC (Canada)	1–1	(Canada) Serbian White Eagles	Toronto
	de Guzman 80' (pen.)	(report)	Viciknez 60'	Stadium: BMO Field; Attendance: 0

July 22, 2009	Toronto FC (Canada)	0–0 (a.e.t.) (3–4 p)	(Argentina) River Plate	Toronto
	Gala (yellow card) 42'	(report)		Stadium: BMO Field; Attendance: 20,005; Referee: Silviu Petrescu
	Penalties
	Gerba (penalty scored); Dichio (penalty missed); Vitti (penalty missed); Barrett (penalty scored); Garcia (penalty scored); Vélez (penalty missed)		Abelairas (penalty scored); Lamela (penalty scored); A. Fernández (penalty missed); Villalba (penalty missed); Domingo (penalty scored); G. Fernández (penalty scored)

August 7, 2009	Toronto FC (Canada)	1–5	(Spain) Real Madrid	Toronto
	Gala 75'	(report)	Raúl 13', 26'; Ronaldo 19'; Benzema 65'; Robben 86'	Stadium: BMO Field; Attendance: 22,089; Referee: Paul Ward

== Squad statistics ==
Competitive matches only. Numbers in brackets indicate appearances as a substitute.
Updated to games played October 24, 2009.

=== Players ===
Number	Position	Name	MLS regular season		MLS Cup Playoffs		Canadian Championship		CONCACAF Champions League		Total	
Number	Position	Name	Apps	Goals	Apps	Goals	Apps	Goals	Apps	Goals	Apps	Goals
2	MF	(United States) Sam Cronin	26 (1)	1	–	–	3 (0)	0	2 (0)	0	31 (1)	1
3	DF	(Canada) Nana Attakora	19 (1)	2	–	–	4 (0)	0	–	–	23 (1)	2
4	DF	(United States) Nick Garcia	13 (0)	0	–	–	1 (0)	0	2 (0)	0	16 (0)	0
4	DF	(Puerto Rico) Marco Vélez^{1}	8 (7)	0	–	–	2 (2)	0	–	–	10 (9)	0
5	DF	(Canada) Kevin Harmse^{1}	8 (4)	0	–	–	2 (1)	1	–	–	10 (5)	1
5	DF	(Haiti) Lesly Fellinga	1 (3)	0	–	–	–	–	–	–	1 (3)	0
6	MF	(Canada) Julian de Guzman	5 (0)	0	–	–	–	–	–	–	5 (0)	0
7	FW	(United States) Fuad Ibrahim	2 (4)	0	–	–	0 (3)	0	–	–	2 (7)	0
8	FW	(Argentina) Pablo Vitti	18 (8)	2	–	–	4 (0)	0	2 (0)	0	24 (8)	2
9	FW	(England) Danny Dichio^{1}	6 (13)	3	–	–	2 (1)	0	0 (2)	0	8 (16)	3
10	MF	(England) Rohan Ricketts^{1}	3 (9)	0	–	–	1 (0)	0	–	–	4 (9)	0
10	FW	(Canada) Ali Gerba	5 (6)	1	–	–	–	–	2 (0)	0	7 (6)	1
11	DF	(Canada) Jim Brennan	28 (0)	2	–	–	4 (0)	0	2 (0)	0	34 (0)	2
13	MF	(United States) Johann Smith^{1}	0 (4)	0	–	–	0 (1)	0	–	–	0 (5)	0
14	MF	(Canada) Dwayne De Rosario	27 (1)	11	–	–	4 (0)	3	2 (0)	0	33 (1)	14
15	DF	(Canada) Adrian Serioux	26 (0)	2	–	–	3 (0)	0	1 (0)	0	30 (0)	2
16	DF	(United States) Marvell Wynne	21 (0)	0	–	–	2 (0)	0	2 (0)	0	25 (0)	0
17	FW	(Jamaica) O'Brian White	5 (4)	2	–	–	–	–	0 (2)	0	5 (6)	2
19	FW	(United States) Chad Barrett	27 (2)	5	–	–	2 (2)	2	1 (1)	0	30 (5)	7
20	MF	(Honduras) Amado Guevara	24 (1)	5	–	–	3 (0)	2	1 (0)	0	28 (1)	7
22	MF	(The Gambia) Amadou Sanyang	3 (4)	0	–	–	–	–	–	–	3 (4)	0
27	DF	(Canada) Gabe Gala	0 (1)	0	–	–	–	–	–	–	0 (1)	0
32	DF	(The Gambia) Emmanuel Gómez	6 (3)	0	–	–	–	–	1 (0)	0	7 (3)	0
33	MF	(Wales) Carl Robinson	20 (1)	0	–	–	4 (0)	0	2 (0)	0	26 (1)	0

=== Goalkeepers ===
Number	Position	Name	MLS regular season				2009 MLS Cup Playoffs				Canadian Championship				CONCACAF Champions League				Total			
Number	Position	Name	Apps	GA	GAA	CS	Apps	GA	GAA	CS	Apps	GA	GAA	CS	Apps	GA	GAA	CS	Apps	GA	GAA	CS
1	GK	(Canada) Greg Sutton^{1}	1 (1)	2	1.33	0	–	–	–	–	1 (0)	2	2.00	0	–	–	–	–	2 (1)	4	1.60	0
18	GK	(United States) Brian Edwards	3 (0)	6	2.00	1	–	–	–	–	–	–	–	–	–	–	–	–	3 (0)	6	2.00	1
24	GK	(Switzerland) Stefan Frei	26 (0)	38	1.49	5	–	–	–	–	3 (0)	1	0.33	2	2 (0)	1	0.50	1	31 (0)	40	1.31	8

=== Disciplinary record ===
Only players with at least one card included.

Number	Position	Name	MLS regular season		MLS Cup Playoffs		Canadian Championship		CONCACAF Champions League		Total	
Number	Position	Name	Yellow card	Red card	Yellow card	Red card	Yellow card	Red card	Yellow card	Red card	Yellow card	Red card
1	GK	(Switzerland) Stefan Frei	1	0	0	0	0	0	0	0	1	0
2	MF	(United States) Sam Cronin	2	0	0	0	0	0	0	0	2	0
3	DF	(Canada) Nana Attakora	2	0	0	0	0	0	0	0	2	0
4	DF	(Puerto Rico) Marco Vélez^{1}	1	0	0	0	1	0	0	0	2	0
4	DF	(United States) Nick Garcia	2	0	0	0	1	0	0	0	3	0
5	MF	(Canada) Kevin Harmse^{1}	2	0	0	0	2	0	0	0	4	0
6	MF	(Canada) Julian de Guzman	1	0	0	0	0	0	0	0	1	0
8	FW	(Argentina) Pablo Vitti	3	0	0	0	0	0	0	0	3	0
9	FW	(England) Danny Dichio^{1}	2	0	0	0	1	0	0	0	3	0
10	MF	(England) Rohan Ricketts^{1}	1	0	0	0	0	0	0	0	1	0
10	FW	(Canada) Ali Gerba	1	0	0	0	0	0	0	0	1	0
11	DF	(Canada) Jim Brennan	8	0	0	0	1	0	0	0	9	0
14	MF	(Canada) Dwayne De Rosario	5	0	0	0	1	0	0	0	6	0
15	DF	(Canada) Adrian Serioux	6	1	0	0	0	0	0	0	6	1
16	DF	(United States) Marvell Wynne	1	0	0	0	0	0	0	0	1	0
17	FW	(Jamaica) O'Brian White	2	0	0	0	0	0	0	0	2	0
19	FW	(United States) Chad Barrett	5	1	0	0	0	0	0	0	5	1
20	MF	(Honduras) Amado Guevara	3	0	0	0	0	0	0	0	3	0
22	MF	(The Gambia) Amadou Sanyang	2	1	0	0	0	0	0	0	2	1
32	DF	(The Gambia) Emmanuel Gómez	1	0	0	0	0	0	0	0	1	0
33	MF	(Wales) Carl Robinson	6	0	0	0	1	0	1	0	8	0
		TOTALS	57	3	0	0	8	0	1	0	66	3

^{1}Player is no longer with team
