= 2009 Vancouver Whitecaps FC season =

Vancouver Whitecaps FC 2009 soccer season

Vancouver Whitecaps FC
2009 season
- Owners: Greg Kerfoot; Jeff Mallet; Steve Luczo; Steve Nash
- Head coach: Teitur Thordarson
- USL-1: 7th
- USL-1 Playoffs: Runners-Up
- Canadian Championship: Runners-Up
- Highest home attendance: 5,886; Oct 10 vs MI
- Lowest home attendance: 4,516; Oct 1 vs PT
- Average home league attendance: 5,312
Home colours	Away colours

The 2009 Vancouver Whitecaps season was the club's 24th year of existence (or 34th if counting the NASL Whitecaps), as well as their 17th and 2nd last year as a Division 2 club in the franchise model of US-based soccer leagues. Vancouver was officially named an MLS expansion city on March 18, 2009. Following the end of the 2010 season, the Whitecaps FC joined MLS, becoming the second Canadian club and 19th overall (counting contracted franchises) to enter the league.

The 2009 season started in an up and down fashion including three game winning and losing streaks before ending the season with only one loss in their last ten games. The USL-1 league was a closely contested affair with the Whitecaps a member of an intermediate trifecta in the standings separated by less than three points. The Whitecaps overcame the Railhawks and Timbers in tight, hard won playoff series before finishing as runners-up to the Montreal Impact in a dramatic playoff final series.

The Whitecaps also finished second in the 2009 Voyageurs Cup in a controversial fashion after Montreal rested important players for their following USL-1 league match against the Whitecaps.

== 2009 Montreal controversy ==
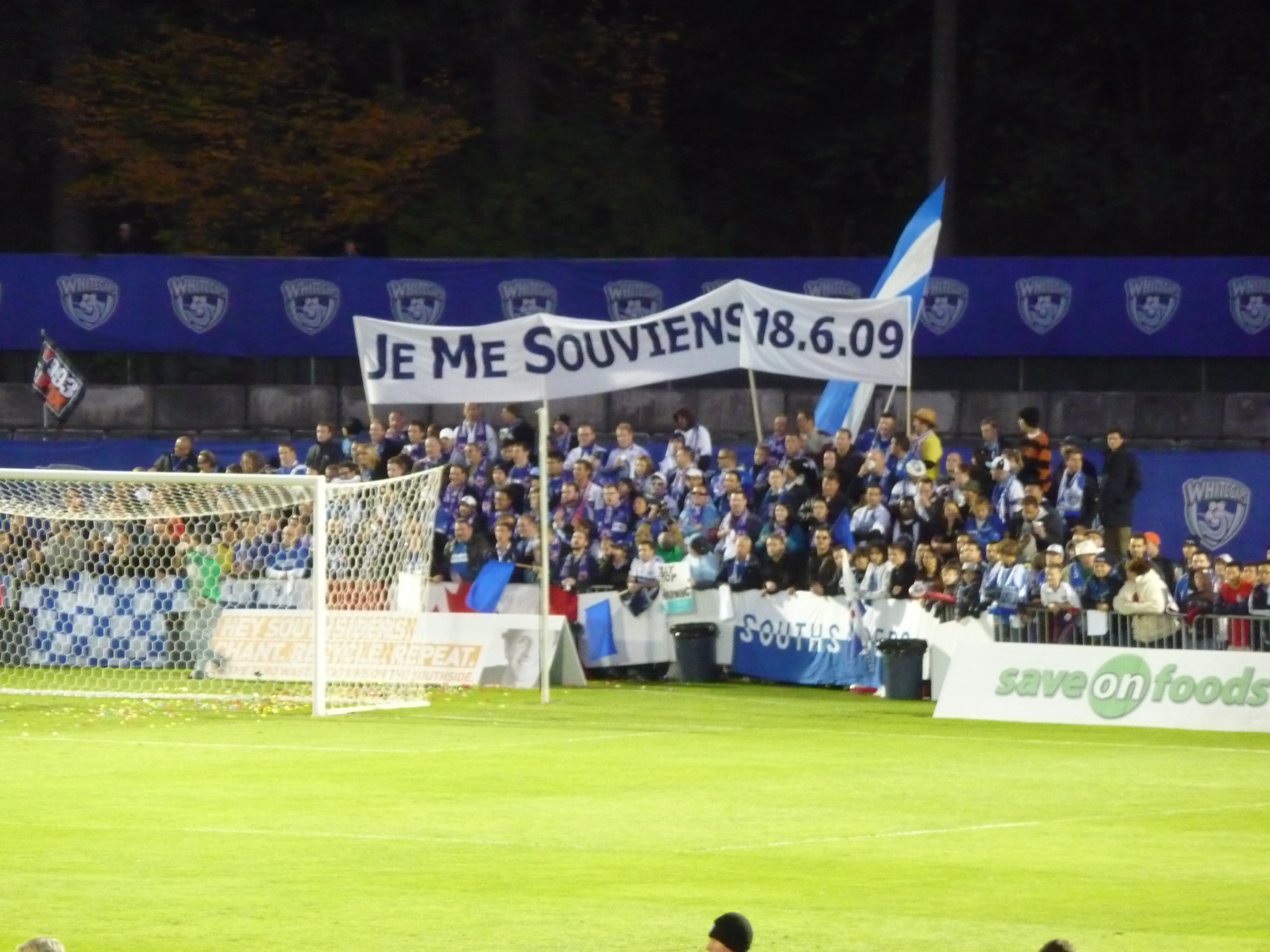
The Southsiders, a Whitecaps supporters group, with a Je me souviens banner referencing the events of June 18, 2009 during a match against the Impact on October 10, 2009.

- June 18, 2009: After losing any chance to win the round robin, the Impact lose 1–6 to TFC giving the Voyageurs Cup to TFC over Vancouver on goal difference while coach Marc Dos Santos rests key players for the league match against Vancouver two days later. The Vancouver Whitecaps team attended the TFC-Impact game.
- June 20, 2009: Two days later Montreal Impact win their USL-1 league game 2–1 against Vancouver. The Montreal Ultras protest against Impact management's unsportsmanlike behaviour two days earlier during the first half.
- September 18, 2009: The extra three points Montreal got against Vancouver is also the difference between fifth and seventh place in the end-of-season league standings putting the Whitecaps at a lower seed in the USL season ending playoff tournament.
- October 17, 2009: Montreal Impact win the league playoff final's second leg 3–1 at home with the Whitecaps playing shorthanded due to a second sending off in a row, and Montreal wins the USL-1 Championship 6–3 on aggregate.

== Schedule and results ==
=== Tables ===
Commissioner's Cup, bye to semifinal round of playoffs
Quarterfinal round of playoffs

Pos	Club	Pts	GP	W	D	L	GF	GA	GD	H2H Pts
1	Portland Timbers	58	30	16	10	4	45	19	+26	
2	Carolina RailHawks	55	30	16	7	7	43	19	+24	
3	Puerto Rico Islanders	53	30	15	8	7	44	31	+13	PUE: 6 pts CHA: 3 pts
4	Charleston Battery	53	30	14	11	5	33	21	+12	PUE: 6 pts CHA: 3 pts
5	Montreal Impact	43	30	12	7	11	32	31	+1	
6	Rochester Rhinos	43	30	11	10	9	34	32	+2	
7	Vancouver Whitecaps	42	30	11	9	10	42	36	+6	
8	Minnesota Thunder	31	30	7	10	13	39	44	−5	
9	Miami FC	29	30	8	5	17	26	52	−26	
10	Austin Aztex	21^{†}	30	5	8	17	28	51	−23	
11	Cleveland City Stars	19	30	4	7	19	22	52	−30	

^{†} Austin deducted two points for fielding an ineligible player on July 25, 2009

==== Results summary ====
Overall								Home						Away					
Pld	Pts	W	L	T	GF	GA	GD	W	L	T	GF	GA	GD	W	L	T	GF	GA	GD
30	42	11	10	9	42	36	+6	9	3	3	26	15	+11	2	7	6	16	21	−5

Last updated: April 26, 2010
Source: uslsoccer.com
Pld = Matches played; Pts = Points; W = Matches won; T = Matches tied; L = Matches lost; GF = Goals for; GA = Goals against; GD = Goal difference

Win Draw Loss

=== Pre-season ===
2009-02-13	Vancouver Whitecaps FC	3–1	Trinity Western University	Burnaby, BC
15:00 PST	Marcus Haber; Marlon James; Alex Semenets			Stadium: Burnaby Lakes West

2009-02-21	Seattle Sounders FC	4–0	Vancouver Whitecaps FC	Seattle, WA
12:00 PST	Nate Jaqua 37', 39'; Freddy Montero 66', 67'	report		Stadium: Qwest Field; Attendance: 0

2009-02-28	UVic Vikes	0–3	Vancouver Whitecaps FC	Victoria, British Columbia
15:00 PST			Lyle Martin	Stadium: Centennial Stadium,

2009-03-09	Young Africans S.C.	3–0	Vancouver Whitecaps FC	Dar es Salaam, Tanzania
06:00 PST	Jerson Tegete 39', 40'; Michael Baraza 65'			Stadium: National Stadium; Attendance: 12,000

2009-03-12	Simba SC	1–2	Vancouver Whitecaps FC	Dar es Salaam, Tanzania
06:30 PST	Haruna Moshi 24'		Marlon James 3', 45'	Stadium: National Stadium

2009-03-14	Tanzania Nationals	0–0	Vancouver Whitecaps FC	Dar es Salaam, Tanzania
06:30 PST				Stadium: National Stadium; Attendance: 5,000

2009-03-24	University of BC	2–5	Vancouver Whitecaps FC	Vancouver, BC
18:00 PST	Tyson Keam; Scott Barling	report	Marlon James; Vicente Arze; Tyrell Burgess; Gordon Chin	Stadium: UBC Thunderbird Park

2009-03-29	Vancouver Whitecaps FC	4–0	Seattle University	Tsawwassen, British Columbia
17:00 PST	Charles Gbeke 11', 82'; Marlon James 50'; Tyler Rosenlund 72'			Stadium: Winskill Park

2009-04-03	Vancouver Whitecaps FC	1–1	Portland Timbers	Burnaby, BC
13:00 PST	Wesley Charles 68'		Johan Claesson 82'	Stadium: Burnaby Lakes West

=== USL-1 ===
==== Results by round ====
Round	1	2	3	4	5	6	7	8	9	10	11	12	13	14	15	16	17	18	19	20	21	22	23	24	25	26	27	28	29	30
Ground	H	A	A	H	A	H	H	A	H	H	A	A	H	A	A	H	A	A	A	H	H	A	A	H	H	H	A	A	H	H
Result	D	L	D	W	W	W	L	L	L	W	L	D	W	L	L	W	W	D	L	L	D	D	D	W	D	W	D	L	W	W

Source: uslsoccer.com
A = Away; H = Home; W = Win; D = Draw; L = Loss

April 11, 2009 1	Vancouver Whitecaps FC	0–0	Charleston Battery	Burnaby, BC
22:00 ET				Stadium: Swangard Stadium; Attendance: 5037; Referee: Fabrizio Romano

April 18, 2009 2	Puerto Rico Islanders	2–1	Vancouver Whitecaps FC	Bayamón, Puerto Rico
19:00 ET	Nicholas Adderly 6', 38'	report	Marcus Haber 2'	Stadium: Juan Ramón Loubriel Stadium; Attendance: 5250; Referee: Bryan Roslund

May 21, 2009 3	Austin Aztex FC	1–1	Vancouver Whitecaps FC	Austin, Texas
20:30 ET	Gifton Noel-Williams 67'	report	Marco Reda 18'	Stadium: Nelson Field; Attendance: 1549; Referee: Elias Bazakos

April 25, 2009 4	Portland Timbers	0–1	Vancouver Whitecaps FC	Portland, Oregon
22:00 ET		report	Martin Nash 63'	Stadium: PGE Park; Attendance: 5,102; Referee: Mathieu Bourdeau

May 2, 2009 5	Minnesota Thunder	2–3	Vancouver Whitecaps	Minneapolis
20:05 ET	Ricardo Sánchez 48', 69'	report	Marlon James 35', 61', 90'	Stadium: National Sports Center; Attendance: 3,298; Referee: Niko Bratsis

May 10, 2009 6	Vancouver Whitecaps FC	1–0	Puerto Rico Islanders	Burnaby, BC
22:00 ET	Charles Gbeke 82'	report		Stadium: Swangard Stadium; Attendance: 5023; Referee: John Oliva

May 16, 2009 7	Vancouver Whitecaps FC	1–2	Rochester Rhinos	Burnaby, BC
22:00 ET	Dever Orgill 90'	report	Chris Nurse 17'; Johnny Menyongar 37'	Stadium: Swangard Stadium; Attendance: 5288; Referee: Justin Tasev

May 30, 2009 8	Portland Timbers	2–0	Vancouver Whitecaps FC	Portland, Oregon
22:00 ET	Ryan Pore 6'; George Josten 41'	report		Stadium: PGE Park; Attendance: 9081; Referee: Hidajet Tica

June 7, 2009 9	Vancouver Whitecaps FC	1–2	Montreal Impact	Burnaby, BC
22:00 ET	Marcus Haber 42'	report	Eduardo Sebrango 20'; Daniel Testo 44'	Stadium: Swangard Stadium; Attendance: 5288; Referee: Domenic Scali

June 12, 2009 10	Vancouver Whitecaps FC	3–2	Miami FC Blues	Burnaby, BC
23:00 ET	Charles Gbeke 16', 34'; Marco Reda 76'	report	Zourab Tsiskaridze 10'; Richard Perdomo 78'	Stadium: Swangard Stadium; Attendance: 5288; Referee: John Oliva

June 20, 2009 11	Montreal Impact	1–2	Vancouver Whitecaps FC	Montreal
13:30 ET	Rocco Placentino 34'; Roberto Brown 39'	report	Marlon James 63'	Stadium: Stade Saputo; Attendance: 12,287; Referee: Justin Tasev

June 23, 2009 12	Cleveland City Stars	2–2	Vancouver Whitecaps FC	Bedford, Ohio
19:00 ET	Leo Gibson 28'; Pato Aguilera 45' (pen.)	report	Marcus Haber 18'; Martin Nash 90'	Stadium: Middlefield Cheese Stadium; Attendance: 1,066; Referee: Niko Bratsis

July 9, 2009 13	Vancouver Whitecaps FC	4–0	Minnesota Thunder	Burnaby, BC
22:30 ET	Lyle Martin 7'; Martin Nash 71'; Charles Gbeke 79'; Marcus Haber 81'	report		Stadium: Swangard Stadium; Attendance: 5,568; Referee: Mathieu Bourdeau

July 12, 2008 14	Miami FC Blues	2–1	Vancouver Whitecaps FC	Miami
18:00 ET	Alen Marcina 5'; Leo Inacio Nunes 23'	report	Dever Orgill 89'	Stadium: FIU Stadium; Attendance: 405; Referee: Lee Suckle

July 17, 2009 15	Carolina RailHawks	2–1	Vancouver Whitecaps FC	Cary, North Carolina
20:00 ET	Own goal 44'; Sallieu Bundu 65'	report	Charles Gbeke 90'	Stadium: WakeMed Soccer Park; Attendance: 4,018; Referee: Tony Russo

July 25, 2009 16	Vancouver Whitecaps FC	4–2	Puerto Rico Islanders	Burnaby, BC
22:00 ET	Marcus Haber 4'; Own goal 51'; Marlon James 64', 82'	report	Josh Hansen 76', 90'	Stadium: Swangard Stadium; Attendance: 5,725; Referee: John Oliva

July 31, 2009 17	Rochester Rhinos	1–3	Vancouver Whitecaps FC	Rochester, New York
20:00 ET	Tiger Fitzpatrick 63'	report	Marlon James 43' (pen.), 60'; Tyler Burgess 69'	Stadium: Marina Auto Stadium; Attendance: 6,411; Referee: Jan Halaska

August 1, 2009 18	Cleveland City Stars	0–0	Vancouver Whitecaps FC	Bedford, Ohio
19:00 ET		report		Stadium: Middlefield Cheese Stadium; Attendance: 1,363; Referee: Rizal Milliken

August 6, 2009 19	Portland Timbers	1–0	Vancouver Whitecaps FC	Portland, Oregon
22:00 ET	Ryan Pore 30'	report		Stadium: PGE Park; Attendance: 10,786

August 7, 2009 20	Charleston Battery	1–2	Vancouver Whitecaps FC	Burnaby, BC
23:00 ET	Martin Nash 80'	report	Darren Spicer 24'; Randi Patterson 35'	Stadium: Swangard Stadium; Attendance: 5,288

August 15, 2009 21	Vancouver Whitecaps FC	0–0	Carolina RailHawks FC	Burnaby, BC
22:00 ET		report		Stadium: Swangard Stadium; Attendance: 5,484; Referee: Dave Gantar

August 18, 2009 22	Carolina RailHawks	1–1	Vancouver Whitecaps FC	Cary, North Carolina
19:00 ET	Andriy Budnyy 87'	report	Marcus Haber 66'	Stadium: WakeMed Soccer Park; Attendance: 2,377; Referee: Jeff Gontarek

August 20, 2009 23	Charleston Battery	1–1	Vancouver Whitecaps FC	Charleston, South Carolina
19:30 ET	Ian Fuller 47'	report	Charles Gbeke 5'	Stadium: Blackbaud Stadium; Attendance: 2,746; Referee: Carlos Sandoval

August 23, 2009 24	Vancouver Whitecaps FC	2–0	Miami FC Blues	Burnaby, BC
19:00 ET	Charles Gbeke 80', 90'	report		Stadium: Swangard Stadium; Attendance: 5,288; Referee: Michael Edmunds

August 29, 2009 25	Vancouver Whitecaps FC	1–1	Rochester Rhinos	Burnaby, BC
22:00 ET	Charles Gbeke 66'	report	Ze Roberto 80'	Stadium: Swangard Stadium; Attendance: 5288; Referee: Carol Anne Chenard

September 2, 2009 26	Vancouver Whitecaps FC	3–2	Austin Aztex FC	Burnaby, BC
22:30 ET	Kenold Versailles 11'; Charles Gbeke 23', 65'	report	Jean Alexandre 34', 76'	Stadium: Swangard Stadium; Attendance: 5,081; Referee: Dave Gantar

September 4, 2009 27	Minnesota Thunder	1–1	Vancouver Whitecaps FC	Minneapolis
20:00 ET	Melvin Tarley 87'	report	Marcus Haber 38'	Stadium: National Sports Center; Attendance: 3,429; Referee: Ben Chouaf

September 4, 2009 28	Montreal Impact	0–1	Vancouver Whitecaps FC	Montreal
20:00 ET	Peter Byers 90'	report		Stadium: Stade Saputo; Attendance: 11,867; Referee: Silvio Petrescu

September 13, 2009 29	Vancouver Whitecaps FC	2–1	Austin Aztex FC	Burnaby, BC
19:00 ET	Marcus Haber 80'; Gordon Chin 86'	report	Jarius Holmes 51'	Stadium: Swangard Stadium; Attendance: 5,288; Referee: Mathieu Bourdeau

September 18, 2009 30	Vancouver Whitecaps FC	2–1	Cleveland City Stars	Burnaby, BC
23:00 ET	Charles Gbeke 11'; Marlon James 73' (pen.)	report	Teteh Bangura 45'	Stadium: Swangard Stadium; Attendance: 5,642; Referee: Geoff Gamble

==== Post-season ====
Play-in round

September 24, 2009 Leg 1	Vancouver Whitecaps FC	1–0	Carolina Railhawks	Burnaby, BC
22:30 ET	Randy Edwini-Bonsu 77'	report		Stadium: Swangard Stadium; Attendance: 5,135; Referee: Fabrizio Romano

September 27, 2009 Leg 2	Carolina Railhawks	0–0 (0–1 agg.)	Vancouver Whitecaps FC	Cary, North Carolina
17:00 ET		report		Stadium: WakeMed Soccer Park; Attendance: 2,471; Referee: Niko Bratsis

Semi-finals

October 1, 2009 Leg 1	Vancouver Whitecaps FC	2–1	Portland Timbers	Burnaby, BC
22:30 ET	Charles Gbeke 25'; Marco Reda (red card) 45'; Marcus Haber 49'	report	Ryan Pore 44' (pen.)	Stadium: Swangard Stadium; Attendance: 4,516; Referee: Geoff Gamble

October 4, 2009 Leg 2	Portland Timbers	3–3 (4–5 agg.)	Vancouver Whitecaps FC	Portland, Oregon
19::00 ET	Brian Farber 10', 43'; Alex Nimo 83'	report	Marcus Haber 4'; Martin Nash 60'; Marlon James 71'	Stadium: PGE Park; Attendance: 14,283; Referee: Gilario Grajeda

Finals

October 10, 2009 Leg 1	Vancouver Whitecaps FC	2–3	Montreal Impact	Burnaby, BC
21:30 ET	Martin Nash (red card) 51'; Marcus Haber 56'; Marlon James 65'	report	Shaun Pejic 45' (o.g.); Peter Byers 63'; Eduardo Sebrango 89'	Stadium: Swangard Stadium; Attendance: 5886; Referee: Carol Anne Chenard

October 17, 2009 Leg 2	Montreal Impact	3–1 (6–3 agg.)	Vancouver Whitecaps FC	Montreal
14:30 ET	Tony Donatelli 30' (pen.); Joey Gjertsen 40'; Roberto Brown 42'	report	Shaun Pejic (red card) 29'; Ansu Toure 44'	Stadium: Stade Saputo; Attendance: 13,034; Referee: Dave Gantar

=== Voyageurs Cup ===
==== Standings ====
Pos	Team	Pld	W	D	L	GF	GA	GD	Pts	Qualification
1	Toronto FC (C)	4	3	0	1	8	3	+5	9	Champions League
2	Vancouver Whitecaps	4	3	0	1	5	1	+4	9	
3	Montreal Impact	4	0	0	4	1	10	−9	0	

Source: Canada Soccer
Rules for classification: 1) points; 2) points in matches between drawn teams; 3) goal differential; 4) number of goals scored; 5) drawing of lots.
(C) Champions

==== Results ====
May 6, 2009 1	Toronto FC	1–0	Vancouver Whitecaps FC	Toronto, Ontario
17:00 PST	Kevin Harmse 3'	report		Stadium: BMO Field, Attendance: 19,811; Referee: Silviu Petrescu

May 20, 2009 2	Montreal Impact	0–2	Vancouver Whitecaps FC	Montreal
17:00 PST		report	Marcus Haber 1'; Charles Gbeke 17'	Stadium: Stade Saputo; Attendance: 11,483; Referee: Steven Depiero

May 27, 2009 3	Vancouver Whitecaps	1–0	Montreal Impact	Burnaby, BC
19:30 PST	Ethan Gage 67'	report		Stadium: Swangard Stadium; Attendance: 5,134; Referee: David Gantar

June 2, 2009 4	Vancouver Whitecaps FC	2–0	Toronto FC	Burnaby, BC
19:30 PST	Ansu Toure 31', 81'	report		Stadium: Swangard Stadium; Attendance: 5,688

=== Cascadia Cup ===
2009 Cascadia Cup standings
Team	Pld	W	L	D	GF	GA	GD	Pts
Portland Timbers	3	2	1	0	3	1	+2	6
Vancouver Whitecaps	3	1	2	0	1	3	−2	3

Source: "Cascadia Cup". cascadiacup.soccer. January 2009.

== Staff ==
=== Professional teams ===
- President – Bob Lenarduzzi
- Director of professional teams – Greg Anderson
- Manager professional teams – Lindsay Puchlik
- Manager communications – Nathan Vanstone
- Head coach men's – Teitur Thordarson
- Assistant coach, men's – Todd Wawrousek
- Head coach, women's – Alan Koch
- Assistant coach, Women's -
- Women's manager – Diane Voice
- Club logistics manager – Matt Holbrook
- Equipment manager – Darren Woloshen

=== Youth development ===
- Youth development director – Dan Lenarduzzi
- Youth development administrator – Marlise Buchi

=== Professional development program ===
- Managing director, professional development – Chris Murphy
- Managing director, residency – Thomas Niendorf
- Administrator, residency – Allison Hogg
- Manager, technical programs – Dave Irvine
- Developer, whitecaps interactive – Byron Ribble
- Head coach, prospects boys – Bart Choufour
- Head coach, prospects girls – Jesse Symons

=== Community soccer system ===
- Manager, community soccer system – Sam Lenarduzzi

== Roster ==
Both Jay Nolly and Marcus Haber played all thirty regular season games with Jay Nolly playing every minute of every game. Charles Gbeke was tied for second among the USL-1 point leaders including the league golden boot with 12 goals while Marcus Haber was 7th (with 8 goals) and Marlon James 8th. Wes Knight had eight assists in the league.

After the 2008 season, the Whitecaps and coach Teitur Thordarson changed the roster much more than in the previous seven years. Some of this was due to a ten-month contract versus the previous norm of an eight-month contract. Look at the preseason above starting in February with presumably a training camp before hand versus previous years of training camp starting in late March. For some players with other part-time or off season employment and/or families the extra commitment was too much. Many long time stalwart veteran Whitecap players such as Jeff Clarke, Jason Jordan, Steve Kindel and Alfredo Valente were not on the 2009 roster. Additionally, several other players earning significant playing time over a number of years moved elsewhere. Eduardo Sebrango and back-up goalkeeper Serge Djekanovic started the 2009 season with Canadian rival Montreal while Nicholas Addlery went all the way to Puerto Rico.

Two players who remained to serve as the backbone of the side for 2009 were Martin Nash, the captain, and striker Charles Gbeke for offense. The club added Marco Reda from Charleston, Justin Thompson from Portland, and Ansu Toure from Miami. Foreign players signings included Caribbean internationals Kenold Versailles (Haiti) and Tyrell Burgess (Bermuda), who spent 2008 with the USL PDL's Reading Rage. Another signing for the portion of the season he was with the Whitecaps was former New York Red Bulls defender Jeff Parke.

All stats as of the end of the season.

=== Goalkeeper stats ===
No.	Nat.	Player	Total					USL-1					Playoffs				
No.	Nat.	Player	MIN	SV	GA	GAA	SO	MIN	SV	GA	GAA	SO	MIN	SV	GA	GAA	SO
1	(United States)	Jay Nolly	3240	145	46	1.28	9	2700	118	36	1.20	7	540	27	10	1.67	2

|} Updated to match played October 20, 2013

=== Player statistics ===
No.	Pos.	Name	Apps	Minutes	Goals	Assists	Shots	Fouls	Yellow card	Red card			
No.	Pos.	Name	1	GK	(United States) Jay Nolly	36	3540	0	0	0	1	2	0
2	DF	(Canada) Marco Reda	14(2)	1274	2	0	6	12	4	0			
4	DF	(Canada) Justin Thompson	2(2)	226	0	0	1	4	1	0			
4	DF	(Wales) Shaun Pejic	15	1344	0	0	4	9	1	1			
4	DF	(Saint Vincent and the Grenadines) Wesley Charles	12	1025	0	0	2	15	1	1			
6	DF	(Canada) Luca Bellisomo	12(4)	1168	0	1	4	7	3	0			
7	MF	(Canada) Martin Nash	29	2481	4	3	27	23	5	1			
8	DF	(United States) Wes Knight	35(1)	2855	1	9	16	35	4	0			
9	FW	(Saint Vincent and the Grenadines) Marlon James	12(11)	1160	11	2	59	29	4	0			
13	MF	(Haiti) Kénold Versailles	9(5)	912	1	0	13	31	4	0			
13	MF	(Canada) Geordie Lyall	2(5)	253	0	0	1	4	1	0			
14	FW	(Canada) Marcus Haber	30(6)	2422	11	4	42	30	2	0			
15	MF	(Canada) Philippe Davies	1(1)	65	0	0	2	2	0	0			
16	MF	(Liberia) Ansu Toure	20(7)	1579	1	3	36	16	4	0			
17	FW	(Canada) Randy Edwini-Bonsu	(15)	214	1	1	8	3	0	0			
18	DF	(Canada) Mason Trafford	12(14)	1256	0	2	7	18	2	0			
19	MF	(Canada) Chris Pozniak	11(2)	1009	0	0	6	11	1	0			
20	MF	(Canada) Ethan Gage	9(8)	803	0	0	7	17	1	0			
20	FW	(Canada) Charles Gbeke	28(6)	2338	13	2	79	58	3	1			
20	MF	(Jamaica) Dever Orgill	2(9)	301	2	1	7	10	2	0			
22	DF	(Japan) Takashi Hirano	33(1)	2954	0	2	6	33	0				
23	MF	(Bolivia) Vicente Arze	8(10)	797	0	1	14	23	3	0			
24	DF	(United States) Lyle Martin	19(4)	1728	1	2	12	14	2	0			
25	MF	(Bermuda) Tyrell Burgess	11(14)	1047	1	2	28	15	2	0			
25	MF	(United States) Justin Moose	2(10)	323	0	0	2	6	1	0			
27	DF	(United States) Jeff Parke	7	524	0	0	3	5	1	0			
28	MF	(Canada) Gordon Chin	14(12)	1397	1	4	24	20	3	0			
29	MF	(Tanzania) Nizar Khalfan	9(5)	729	0	0	20	8	0	0			
37	MF	(Nigeria) Michael Onwatuegwu	1	45	0	0	0	2	0	0			
99	GK	(Brazil) Diego	1	4	0	0	0	0	0	0			
—	–	Opponent Own goals	–	–	0	–	–	–	–	–			

Updated February 28, 2014
- Note this list includes only players that have dressed in the eighteen.
- Note brackets indicate substitute appearances.
- Note statistics are for league and playoffs (not preseason). Voyageurs Cup statistics appear to no longer be available.
