= Miracle in Montreal =

2009 soccer match between Montreal Impact and Toronto FC

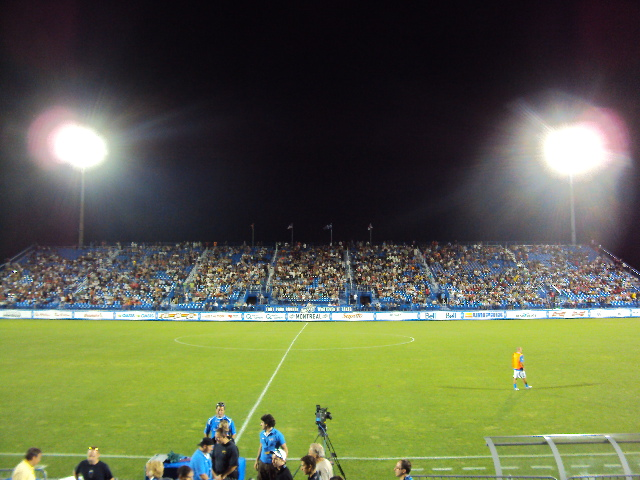
- Saputo Stadium hosted the match
- Event: 2009 Canadian Championship
Montreal Impact	Toronto FC
1	6
- Date: June 18, 2009
- Venue: Saputo Stadium, Montreal, Quebec
- Referee: Carol Anne Chénard
- Attendance: 11,561

Montreal Impact 1–6 Toronto FC, often referred to as the Miracle in Montreal, was a soccer match played on June 18, 2009 at Saputo Stadium in Montreal, Quebec between Montreal Impact of the USL First Division and Toronto FC of Major League Soccer.

== Background ==
The match was the final fixture of the 2009 Canadian Championship. With Montreal already eliminated and the Vancouver Whitecaps leading the table, Toronto FC needed to win by four or more goals to capture its first Voyageurs Cup and a berth in the 2009–10 CONCACAF Champions League.

Pos	Team	Pld	W	D	L	GF	GA	GD	Pts	Qualification	VAN	TOR	MTL
1	Vancouver Whitecaps	4	3	0	1	5	1	+4	9	Champions League	—	2–0	1–0
2	Toronto FC	3	2	0	1	2	2	0	6		1–0	—	1–0
3	Montreal Impact (E)	3	0	0	3	0	4	−4	0		0–2	Jun 18	—

Updated to match(es) played on June 2, 2008. Source: Canada Soccer
Rules for classification: 1) points; 2) points in matches between drawn teams; 3) goal differential; 4) number of goals scored; 5) drawing of lots.
(E) Eliminated

== Match ==
Tony Donatelli gave Montreal a 1–0 lead early in the first half on a penalty kick, which meant Toronto needed five or more goals to beat Vancouver on goal differential. Toronto went on to score six unanswered goals, including three straight from captain Dwayne De Rosario and late strikes from Chad Barrett and Amado Guevara, en route to capturing the 2009 Canadian Championship and a place in the CONCACAF Champions League. The 6–1 defeat was the worst in Montreal's club history at the time.

=== Details ===
June 18, 2009
8:00 pm EDT

Montreal Impact	1–6	Toronto FC
Donatelli 24' (pen.)	Report	De Rosario 29', 39', 49'; Guevara 69', 90+1'; Barrett 82'

Saputo Stadium, Montreal, Quebec
Attendance: 11,561
Referee: Carol Anne Chénard

Montreal Impact	Toronto FC

GK	22	(Canada) Srdjan Djekanović
DF	23	(Jamaica) Stephen DeRoux
DF	24	(Canada) Simon Gatti
DF	13	(Canada) Elkana Mayard
DF	2	(United States) Kevin Sakuda
MF	18	(Argentina) Leonardo Di Lorenzo (c)
MF	14	(United States) Tony Donatelli		(substituted off) 65'
MF	17	(United States) Joey Gjertsen
MF	7	(United States) David Testo	(yellow card) 47'	(substituted off) 50'
FW	28	(Antigua and Barbuda) Peter Byers
FW	30	(Canada) Pierre-Rudolph Mayard		(substituted off) 71'
Substitutes
DF	16	(Italy) Stefano Pesoli		(substituted on) 50'
MF	21	(Canada) Félix Brillant		(substituted on) 65'
MF	9	(Canada) Rocco Placentino	(yellow card) 71'	(substituted on) 71'
Manager
(Canada) Marc Dos Santos

GK	24	(Switzerland) Stefan Frei
DF	6	(United States) Nick Garcia	(yellow card) 42'
DF	3	(Canada) Nana Attakora		(substituted off) 80'
DF	11	(Canada) Jim Brennan (c)
DF	15	(Canada) Adrian Serioux		(substituted off) 64'
MF	2	(United States) Sam Cronin
MF	20	(Honduras) Amado Guevara
MF	33	(Wales) Carl Robinson	(yellow card) 63'
FW	14	(Canada) Dwayne De Rosario
FW	9	(England) Danny Dichio
FW	8	(Argentina) Pablo Vitti		(substituted off) 45'
Substitutes
FW	19	(United States) Chad Barrett		(substituted on) 45'
DF	4	(Puerto Rico) Marco Vélez		(substituted on) 64'
FW	7	(United States) Fuad Ibrahim		(substituted on) 80'
Manager
(England) Chris Cummins

Assistant referees
Cameron Blair
Philippe Brière
Fourth official
David Gantar

== Aftermath ==
=== Final results ===
Pos	Team	Pld	W	D	L	GF	GA	GD	Pts	Qualification	TOR	VAN	MTL
1	Toronto FC (C)	4	3	0	1	8	3	+5	9	Champions League	—	1–0	1–0
2	Vancouver Whitecaps	4	3	0	1	5	1	+4	9		2–0	—	1–0
3	Montreal Impact	4	0	0	4	1	10	−9	0		1–6	0–2	—

Source: Canada Soccer
Rules for classification: 1) points; 2) points in matches between drawn teams; 3) goal differential; 4) number of goals scored; 5) drawing of lots.
(C) Champions

=== Montreal and Toronto perspective ===
Toronto FC would go on to lose to Puerto Rico Islanders in the preliminary round of the 2009–10 CONCACAF Champions League.

The match was a significant moment in shaping the rivalry between the Montreal Impact and Toronto FC. In 2011, the Montreal Impact officially joined Major League Soccer, becoming the third Canadian team to do so after Toronto FC and Vancouver Whitecaps FC. This only furthered the rivalry, which became known as the 401 derby and later the Canadian Classique.

Montreal would get retribution against Toronto, beating them 6–0 in the same venue during the 2013 Canadian Championship. This remains the largest margin of victory in Canadian Classique history. (Note: As of 2025.) Toronto would then repeat the scoreline of the 2008 match during the 2025 MLS season, again winning 6–1 in Montreal following an early red card for the home side.

=== Vancouver perspective ===
The Montreal Impact were accused of fielding a weaker squad against Toronto FC to rest key players for the league, since they were no longer in contention for the championship. This was seen as unfair by the Vancouver Whitecaps' supporters, as Montreal's alleged uneven efforts against their opponents was the reason behind Toronto FC scoring as many goals as they did. This became additionally controversial when Montreal's rested players returned in a regular season match against Vancouver, which was not only won by Montreal, but also lead to Montreal gaining a home advantage over Vancouver in the playoffs due to the regular season seeding.

== See also ==
- List of Canadian Championship finals
- Canadian Classique
- Canadiens–Maple Leafs rivalry
