= 2009 Canadian Championship =

2009 professional soccer tournament

2009 Nutrilite Canadian Championship (in English) Championnat canadien Nutrilite 2009 (in French)

Tournament details
- Country: Canada
- Date: May 6 – June 18
- Teams: 3 (from 2 leagues)

Final positions
- Champions: Toronto FC (1st title)
- Runners-up: Vancouver Whitecaps
- Third place: Montreal Impact

Tournament statistics
- Matches played: 6
- Goals scored: 14 (2.33 per match)
- Attendance: 73,549 (12,258 per match)
- Top goal scorer(s): Dwayne De Rosario (3 goals)

Awards
- George Gross Memorial Trophy: Dwayne De Rosario

The 2009 Canadian Championship (officially the Nutrilite Canadian Championship for sponsorship reasons) was a soccer tournament hosted and organized by the Canadian Soccer Association that took place in the cities of Montreal, Toronto and Vancouver in 2009. It was the second Canadian Championship held, after the inaugural competition in 2008.

As in the previous tournament, participating teams were the Montreal Impact, Toronto FC and the Vancouver Whitecaps. The tournament consisted of a home and away series between each pair of teams for a total of six games. Toronto FC, winners of the tournament, were awarded the Voyageurs Cup and gained entry into the preliminary round of the 2009–10 CONCACAF Champions League.

Four of the six matches were broadcast in English by Sportsnet, while Radio Canada broadcast in French two of Montreal Impact's matches at Vancouver and at home against Toronto FC.

== Standings ==
Pos	Team	Pld	W	D	L	GF	GA	GD	Pts	Qualification	TOR	VAN	MTL
1	Toronto FC (C)	4	3	0	1	8	3	+5	9	Champions League	—	1–0	1–0
2	Vancouver Whitecaps	4	3	0	1	5	1	+4	9		2–0	—	1–0
3	Montreal Impact	4	0	0	4	1	10	−9	0		1–6	0–2	—

Source: Canada Soccer
Rules for classification: 1) points; 2) points in matches between drawn teams; 3) goal differential; 4) number of goals scored; 5) drawing of lots.
(C) Champions

== Matches ==
May 6
8:00 pm EDT

Toronto FC	1–0	Vancouver Whitecaps
Harmse 3'	Report

BMO Field, Toronto, Ontario
Attendance: 19,811
Referee: Silviu Petrescu

Toronto FC	Vancouver Whitecaps

GK	24	(Switzerland) Stefan Frei
DF	3	(Canada) Nana Attakora
DF	4	(Puerto Rico) Marco Vélez
DF	11	(Canada) Jim Brennan (c)
DF	16	(United States) Marvell Wynne
MF	5	(Canada) Kevin Harmse	(yellow card) 63'
MF	20	(Honduras) Amado Guevara
MF	33	(Wales) Carl Robinson		(substituted off) 79'
FW	8	(Argentina) Pablo Vitti
FW	14	(Canada) Dwayne De Rosario	(yellow card) 55'
FW	19	(United States) Chad Barrett		(substituted off) 73'
Substitutes
FW	9	(England) Danny Dichio	(yellow card) 93'	(substituted on) 73'
FW	7	(United States) Fuad Ibrahim		(substituted on) 79'
Manager
(England) Chris Cummins

GK	1	(United States) Jay Nolly
DF	2	(Canada) Marco Reda		(substituted off) 14'
DF	6	(Saint Vincent and the Grenadines) Wesley Charles	(yellow card) 63'
DF	18	(Canada) Mason Trafford
DF	27	(United States) Jeff Parke
MF	7	(Canada) Martin Nash (c)
MF	16	(Liberia) Ansu Toure		(substituted off) 76'
MF	19	(United States) Justin Moose	(yellow card) 50'	(substituted off) 66'
MF	23	(Bolivia) Vicente Arze
FW	9	(Saint Vincent and the Grenadines) Marlon James
FW	98	(Canada) Charles Gbeke	(yellow card) 25'
Substitutes
DF	8	(United States) Wes Knight		(substituted on) 14'
MF	22	(Japan) Takashi Hirano		(substituted on) 66'
MF	20	(Canada) Ethan Gage		(substituted on) 76'
Manager
(Iceland) Teitur Thordarson

Assistant referees
Héctor Vergara
Daniel Belleau
Fourth official
David Gantar

May 13
8:00 pm EDT

Toronto FC	1–0	Montreal Impact
Barrett 35'	Report

BMO Field, Toronto, Ontario
Attendance: 19,872
Referee: Mauricio Navarro

Toronto FC	Montreal Impact

GK	24	(Switzerland) Stefan Frei
DF	3	(Canada) Nana Attakora
DF	4	(Puerto Rico) Marco Vélez	(yellow card) 69'
DF	11	(Canada) Jim Brennan (c)
DF	15	(Canada) Adrian Serioux
MF	2	(United States) Sam Cronin
MF	16	(United States) Marvell Wynne		(substituted off) 16'
MF	20	(Honduras) Amado Guevara		(substituted off) 88'
MF	33	(Wales) Carl Robinson
FW	8	(Argentina) Pablo Vitti
FW	14	(Canada) Dwayne De Rosario		(substituted off) 74'
Substitutes
FW	19	(United States) Chad Barrett		(substituted on) 16'
DF	5	(Canada) Kevin Harmse		(substituted on) 74'
FW	7	(United States) Fuad Ibrahim		(substituted on) 88'
Manager
(England) Chris Cummins

GK	1	(United States) Matt Jordan
DF	3	(Canada) Adam Braz
DF	5	(Canada) Nevio Pizzolitto (c)	(yellow card) 45'
DF	25	(France) Cédric Joqueviel
DF	26	(Togo) Zanzan
MF	2	(United States) Kevin Sakuda		(substituted off) 63'
MF	8	(Canada) Sandro Grande
MF	9	(Canada) Rocco Placentino
MF	17	(United States) Joey Gjertsen		(substituted off) 72'
MF	7	(United States) David Testo	(yellow card) 22' (yellow-red card) 71'
FW	10	(Panama) Roberto Brown		(substituted off) 75'
Substitutes
FW	12	(Cuba) Eduardo Sebrango		(substituted on) 63'
MF	21	(Canada) Félix Brillant		(substituted on) 72'
DF	24	(Canada) Simon Gatti		(substituted on) 75'
Manager
(Canada) John Limniatis

Assistant referees
Joe Fletcher
Philippe Brière
Fourth official
Carol Anne Chénard

May 20
8:00 pm EDT

Montreal Impact	0–2	Vancouver Whitecaps
	Report	Haber 1'; Gbeke 17'

Saputo Stadium, Montreal, Quebec
Attendance: 11,483
Referee: Steve Depiero

Montreal Impact	Vancouver Whitecaps

GK	1	(United States) Matt Jordan
DF	2	(United States) Kevin Sakuda
DF	3	(Canada) Adam Braz
DF	5	(Canada) Nevio Pizzolitto (c)
DF	25	(Togo) Zanzan		(substituted off) 60'
MF	8	(Canada) Sandro Grande
MF	9	(Canada) Rocco Placentino		(substituted off) 76'
MF	17	(United States) Joey Gjertsen		(substituted off) 70'
MF	24	(Canada) Simon Gatti
FW	10	(Panama) Roberto Brown	(yellow card) 15'
FW	12	(Cuba) Eduardo Sebrango
Substitutes
MF	23	(Jamaica) Stephen DeRoux		(substituted on) 60'
DF	21	(Canada) Félix Brillant		(substituted on) 70'
FW	28	(Antigua and Barbuda) Peter Byers		(substituted on) 76'
Manager
(Canada) Marc Dos Santos

GK	1	(United States) Jay Nolly
DF	6	(Saint Vincent and the Grenadines) Wesley Charles	(yellow card) 24'
DF	8	(United States) Wes Knight
DF	22	(Japan) Takashi Hirano
DF	27	(United States) Jeff Parke		(substituted off) 30'
MF	7	(Canada) Martin Nash (c)	(yellow card) 90'
MF	16	(Liberia) Ansu Toure		(substituted off) 71'
MF	20	(Canada) Ethan Gage
MF	28	(Canada) Gordon Chin	(yellow card) 8'	(substituted off) 58'
MF	14	(Canada) Marcus Haber	(yellow card) 88'
FW	98	(Canada) Charles Gbeke
Substitutes
DF	4	(Canada) Justin Thompson		(substituted on) 30'
MF	19	(United States) Justin Moose		(substituted on) 58'
DF	12	(Canada) Geordie Lyall		(substituted on) 71'
Manager
(Iceland) Teitur Thordarson

Assistant referees
Daniel Belleau
Philippe Brière
Fourth official
Justin Tasev

May 27
7:30 pm PDT

Vancouver Whitecaps	1–0	Montreal Impact
Gage 67'	Report

Swangard Stadium, Burnaby, British Columbia
Attendance: 5,134
Referee: David Gantar

Vancouver Whitecaps	Montreal Impact

GK	1	(United States) Jay Nolly
DF	4	(Canada) Justin Thompson
DF	8	(United States) Wes Knight
DF	22	(Japan) Takashi Hirano
DF	27	(United States) Jeff Parke	(yellow card) 45'
MF	7	(Canada) Martin Nash (c)	(yellow card) 36'
MF	16	(Liberia) Ansu Toure		(substituted off) 90'
MF	19	(United States) Justin Moose		(substituted off) 63'
MF	20	(Canada) Ethan Gage
FW	14	(Canada) Marcus Haber		(substituted off) 87'
FW	98	(Canada) Charles Gbeke
Substitutes
DF	24	(United States) Lyle Martin		(substituted on) 63'
MF	11	(Jamaica) Dever Orgill		(substituted on) 87'
MF	18	(Canada) Mason Trafford		(substituted on) 90'
Manager
(Iceland) Teitur Thordarson

GK	1	(United States) Matt Jordan	(yellow card) 24'
DF	2	(United States) Kevin Sakuda
DF	3	(Canada) Adam Braz (c)	(yellow card) 53'
DF	24	(Canada) Simon Gatti	(yellow card) 19'
DF	25	(Togo) Zanzan		(substituted off) 74'
MF	8	(Canada) Sandro Grande
MF	18	(Argentina) Leonardo Di Lorenzo		(substituted off) 79'
MF	21	(Canada) Félix Brillant	(yellow card) 38'	(substituted off) 69'
MF	23	(Jamaica) Stephen DeRoux
FW	12	(Cuba) Eduardo Sebrango
FW	17	(United States) Joey Gjertsen
Substitutes
FW	19	(The Gambia) Pa Amadou Gai		(substituted on) 69'
MF	14	(United States) Tony Donatelli		(substituted on) 74'
DF	28	(Antigua and Barbuda) Peter Byers		(substituted on) 79'
Manager
(Canada) Marc Dos Santos

Assistant referees
Darren Clark
Cameron Blair
Fourth official
Paul Ward

June 2
7:30 pm PDT

Vancouver Whitecaps	2–0	Toronto FC
Toure 31', 81'	Report

Swangard Stadium, Burnaby, British Columbia
Attendance: 5,688
Referee: Carol Anne Chénard

Vancouver Whitecaps	Toronto FC

GK	1	(United States) Jay Nolly
DF	6	(Saint Vincent and the Grenadines) Wesley Charles (c)
DF	3	(Japan) Takashi Hirano
DF	24	(United States) Lyle Martin
DF	27	(United States) Jeff Parke
MF	8	(United States) Wes Knight
MF	16	(Liberia) Ansu Toure
MF	20	(Canada) Ethan Gage	(substituted off) 59'
MF	28	(Canada) Gordon Chin
FW	14	(Canada) Marcus Haber	(substituted off) 82'
FW	98	(Canada) Charles Gbeke
Substitutes
MF	18	(Canada) Mason Trafford	(substituted on) 59'
MF	13	(Haiti) Kenold Versailles	(substituted on) 82'
Manager
(Iceland) Teitur Thordarson

GK	1	(Canada) Greg Sutton
DF	3	(Canada) Nana Attakora
DF	5	(Canada) Kevin Harmse	(yellow card) 63'	(substituted off) 83'
DF	11	(Canada) Jim Brennan (c)	(yellow card) 56'	(substituted off) 83'
DF	15	(Canada) Adrian Serioux
MF	2	(United States) Sam Cronin
MF	8	(Argentina) Pablo Vitti
MF	14	(Canada) Dwayne De Rosario
MF	33	(Wales) Carl Robinson
FW	9	(England) Danny Dichio
FW	19	(United States) Chad Barrett		(substituted off) 67'
Substitutes
MF	10	(England) Rohan Ricketts		(substituted on) 67'
MF	13	(United States) Johann Smith		(substituted on) 83'
DF	4	(Puerto Rico) Marco Vélez		(substituted on) 83'
Manager
(England) Chris Cummins

Assistant referees
Daniel Belleau
Pierre Cantave
Fourth official
Mauricio Navarro

June 18
8:00 pm EDT

Montreal Impact	1–6	Toronto FC
Donatelli 24' (pen.)	Report	De Rosario 29', 39', 49'; Guevara 69', 90+1'; Barrett 82'

Saputo Stadium, Montreal, Quebec
Attendance: 11,561
Referee: Carol Anne Chénard

Montreal Impact	Toronto FC

GK	22	(Canada) Srdjan Djekanović
DF	23	(Jamaica) Stephen DeRoux
DF	24	(Canada) Simon Gatti
DF	13	(Canada) Elkana Mayard
DF	2	(United States) Kevin Sakuda
MF	18	(Argentina) Leonardo Di Lorenzo (c)
MF	14	(United States) Tony Donatelli		(substituted off) 65'
MF	17	(United States) Joey Gjertsen
MF	7	(United States) David Testo	(yellow card) 47'	(substituted off) 50'
FW	28	(Antigua and Barbuda) Peter Byers
FW	30	(Canada) Pierre-Rudolph Mayard		(substituted off) 71'
Substitutes
DF	16	(Italy) Stefano Pesoli		(substituted on) 50'
MF	21	(Canada) Félix Brillant		(substituted on) 65'
MF	9	(Canada) Rocco Placentino	(yellow card) 71'	(substituted on) 71'
Manager
(Canada) Marc Dos Santos

GK	24	(Switzerland) Stefan Frei
DF	6	(United States) Nick Garcia	(yellow card) 42'
DF	3	(Canada) Nana Attakora		(substituted off) 80'
DF	11	(Canada) Jim Brennan (c)
DF	15	(Canada) Adrian Serioux		(substituted off) 64'
MF	2	(United States) Sam Cronin
MF	20	(Honduras) Amado Guevara
MF	33	(Wales) Carl Robinson	(yellow card) 63'
FW	14	(Canada) Dwayne De Rosario
FW	9	(England) Danny Dichio
FW	8	(Argentina) Pablo Vitti		(substituted off) 45'
Substitutes
FW	19	(United States) Chad Barrett		(substituted on) 45'
DF	4	(Puerto Rico) Marco Vélez		(substituted on) 64'
FW	7	(United States) Fuad Ibrahim		(substituted on) 80'
Manager
(England) Chris Cummins

Assistant referees
Cameron Blair
Philippe Brière
Fourth official
David Gantar

== Goalscorers ==
Rank	Player	Team	Goals
1	(Canada) Dwayne De Rosario	Toronto FC	3
2	(United States) Chad Barrett	Toronto FC	2
2	(Honduras) Amado Guevara	Toronto FC	2
2	(Liberia) Ansu Toure	Vancouver Whitecaps	2
5	(United States) Tony Donatelli	Montreal Impact	1
5	(Canada) Ethan Gage	Vancouver Whitecaps	1
5	(Canada) Charles Gbeke	Vancouver Whitecaps	1
5	(Canada) Marcus Haber	Vancouver Whitecaps	1
5	(Canada) Kevin Harmse	Toronto FC	1
