= Atte-Oudeyi =

Atte-Oudeyi is an African surname. Notable people with the surname include:

- Ismaila Atte-Oudeyi (born 1985), Togolese footballer, brother of Zanzan
- Zanzan Atte-Oudeyi (born 1980), Togolese footballer
