= Chris Cummins =

Chris Cummins may refer to:

- Christopher C. Cummins (born 1966), American chemist
- Chris Cummins (football manager) (born 1972), former head coach of Toronto F.C.
- Chris Cummins (politician) (born 1962), former Labor member of the Queensland Legislative Assembly

== See also ==
- Chris Cummings (born 1975), musician
