= Harmse =

Harmse is a surname that originates from the Netherlands. The surname Harmse is a variation of the Frisian surnames Harms and Harmsen. The surname also occurs in South Africa due to settlement in the region.

Notable people with the surname include:

- Chris Harmse (born 1973), South-African hammer thrower
- Kevin Harmse (born 1984), South-African born Canadian soccer player
