= 2018 Puerto Rico Soccer League season =

Puerto Rico Soccer League season

Puerto Rico Soccer League
- Season: 2018

The 2018 Puerto Rico Soccer League season would be the 10th season as Puerto Rico's top-division football league.

== League News ==
- On November 3, the PRSL began its first several missions of humanitarian aid from Houston and Fort Lauderdale arriving at Isla Grande Airport with some medical supplies. Two weeks later after several missions of transporting supplies to the island and transport a cancer patient to the city of Houston to receive a bone marrow transplant operation, the PRSL president Joseph "Joey" Serralta, announced the creation of the Joe Serralta Foundation after partnering with the city of Houston to provide humanitarian and philanthropic services that will include special projects in areas of disaster and low resources with great deficiencies and basic needs.

== Teams and personnel ==
=== Managerial changes ===
Team	Outgoing manager	Manner of departure	Date of vacancy	Position in table	Incoming manager	Date of appointment
Bayamon FC	(Spain) Delfín Ferreres	Departed	November 22, 2017	2nd Place	(Puerto Rico) Marco Velez	January 13, 2018
