= Emmanuel Gómez =

Gambian footballer

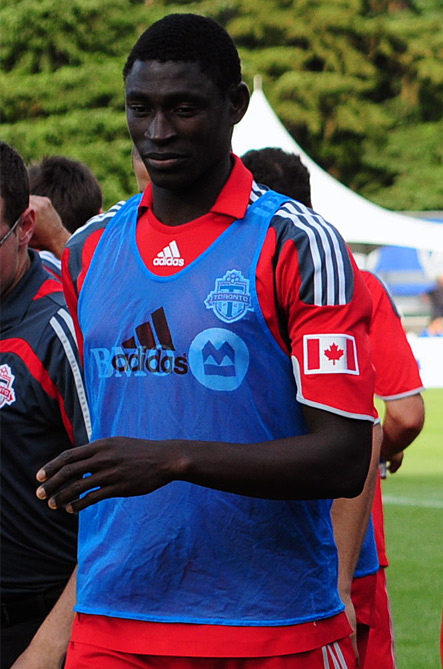

Personal information
- Date of birth: December 20, 1990 (age 35)
- Place of birth: Dippa Kunda, The Gambia
- Height: 6 ft 3 in (1.91 m)
- Position: Defender

Youth career
- 2004–2007: Samger

Senior career*
Years	Team	Apps	(Gls)
2007–2009	Samger		
2009–2010	Toronto FC	9	(0)
2011–2014	Samger		
2014	Lansdowne Bhoys		
2015	Clarkstown SC Eagles		

International career^{‡}
2008–2011	Gambia U-20	9	(0)
2012–2013	Gambia	2	(0)
- * Club domestic league appearances and goals as of June 16, 2013 ‡ National team caps and goals as of June 16, 2013

Emmanuel Gómez (born December 20, 1990, in Dippa Kunda) is a Gambian footballer. He formerly played Toronto FC in Major League Soccer.

== Career ==
=== Professional ===
Gómez began his professional career with Samger of the Gambian Championnat National D1, where he is considered to be one of the top young centre backs in his nation.

His appearances with the Gambian Under-20 national team sparked interest among many Major League Soccer clubs. In early 2009, Gómez signed with Toronto FC along with fellow countrymen Amadou Sanyang. He made his debut for Toronto on 6 June 2009, in a game against Los Angeles Galaxy.

Gomez in his second season with Toronto failed to make any appearances with the club due to knee injury that he picked up during the pre-season training. Gomez was released by Toronto FC on March 1, 2011.

Afterwards, he returned to Samger FC. He has since made a full recovery from his injury and has played over 80 senior matches since then.

In 2014, he played for Lansdowne Bhoys FC. In 2015, he played for Clarkstown SC Eagles.

Gomez is married. He also has two daughters. His wife and two children reside in his native Gambia

=== International ===
Gómez has represented his nation at various youth levels and has two caps at senior level.

== Career stats ==
Club	Season	League			Playoffs		Cup		Continental		Total	
Club	Season	Division	Apps	Goals	Apps	Goals	Apps	Goals	Apps	Goals	Apps	Goals
Toronto FC	2009	Major League Soccer	9	0	–		0	0	1	0	10	0
Toronto FC	2010	Major League Soccer	0	0	–		0	0	0	0	0	0
Career total			9	0	0	0	0	0	1	0	10	0
