= Ismaila Atte-Oudeyi =

Togolese footballer (born 1985)

Smaila Atte-Oudeyi
Personal information
- Full name: Ismaila Atte-Oudeyi
- Date of birth: 2 February 1985 (age 41)
- Place of birth: Lomé, Togo
- Height: 1.92 m (6 ft 4 in)
- Position: Midfielder

Team information
- Current team: Togo Telecom F.C.
- Number: 17

Youth career
- 2002–2004: Modèle Lomé

Senior career*
Years	Team	Apps	(Gls)
2004–2005	AS Douane		
2005–2008	Maranatha F.C.		
2008–2011	Togo Telecom F.C.		
2011–2012	ASKO DE KARA F.C.		

International career^{‡}
2003–2012	Togo	17	(0)
- * Club domestic league appearances and goals as of 00:22 8 June 2012 ‡ National team caps and goals as of 23 June 2006

Ismaila Atte-Oudeyi (born 2 February 1985, in Lomé) is a Togolese footballer, who currently plays for Togo Telecom F.C.

== Career ==
He began his career at AS Douane, played here between 2005 than joined to Maranatha F.C.

== International career ==
Atte-Oudeyi holds two games for Togo his first was on 11 October 2003 against Equatorial Guinea and his second and last game against Mali in Bamako on 27 March 2005.

== Personal life ==
He is the younger brother of Zanzan Atte-Oudeyi.
