= Togo Telecom FC =

Togolese football club

Togo Telecom
- Full name: Togo Telecom F.C.
- Ground: Stade Général Eyadema; Lomé, Togo
- Capacity: 15,000
- League: Togolese Championnat National
Home colours	Away colours

Togo Telecom F.C. is a Togolese football club based in Lomé. They play in the top division in Togolese football. Their home stadium is Stade Général Eyadema.

== Current squad ==
Note: Flags indicate national team as defined under FIFA eligibility rules; some limited exceptions apply. Players may hold more than one non-FIFA nationality.

No.	Pos.	Nation	Player
-	MF	TOG	Ouedakor Date
-	MF	TOG	Ismaila Atte-Oudeyi
