= Lesly Fellinga =

Haitian football player (born 1985)

Personal information
- Full name: Lesly Fellinga
- Date of birth: September 29, 1985 (age 41)
- Place of birth: Port-au-Prince, Haiti
- Height: 5 ft 8 in (1.73 m)
- Position: Leftback

Youth career
- ZVZ uit Zuidlaren
- ZFC Zuidlaren
- Groningen

Senior career*
Years	Team	Apps	(Gls)
2006–2008	Veendam	17	(0)
2008–2009	Heerenveen	2	(0)
2009	Toronto FC	4	(0)
2010	SC Gronitas	5	(1)
2010–2012	Harkemase Boys	43	(0)
2012–2015	Oranje Nassau		

International career^{‡}
2001	Netherlands U16	1	(0)
2007–2008	Haiti U23	5	(0)
2008–2011	Haiti	12	(0)
- * Club domestic league appearances and goals as of 16 May 2012 ‡ National team caps and goals as of 22 August 2009

Lesly Fellinga (born September 29, 1985) is a Haitian retired footballer who played as a left back.

== Playing career ==
=== Club ===
Fellinga was born in the Cité Soleil commune of Port-au-Prince, Haiti, but adopted when he was a baby and grew up in Zuidlaren in the Netherlands. He played youth soccer for local teams ZVZ and ZFC Zuidlaren. In 1996, he was scouted by FC Groningen and started to play in the youth teams.

In 2006, he joined Eerste Divisie club Veendam, and was a regular feature for the club in the 2007–2008 season. Eredivisie club Heerenveen picked him up in a summer 2008 transfer. He made his first team debut for Heerenveen on September 18, 2008, in a European match against Vitória in Portugal . He also played the return leg on October 2, 2008, in Heerenveen.

On August 12, 2009, Fellinga signed with Toronto FC following a successful trial. Fellinga made his debut for Toronto as a sub in a home game against Colorado Rapids on September 12, 2009, and played four MLS games before being released in December of the same year, after Preki became head coach. He joined Groningen amateurclub Gronitas halfway season 2009–2010 and since start season 2010–2011 he played for Frisian amateurclub Harkemase Boys in the Topklasse League, the highest amateur league of the Netherlands, while simultaneously studying communication in Groningen. In 2012 he moved on to fellow amateurs Oranje Nassau.

=== International ===
Fellinga was selected for the Dutch U15, U17 and U19 national teams while playing with Groningen, and played for the Dutch national U15 team against Spain during the international Walker tournament in England in 2001, but was never called up by the senior Dutch national team.

Sensing that opportunities with the Dutch national team would be limited, Fellinga accepted a call up to the Haiti national football team for a friendly against Panama in March 2007. He made his debut for the Haiti U21 selection in a game against the United States in Dallas, Texas, a few days later. After that he played four games with the Haitian Olympic team to qualify for the Olympic of Beijing 2008.

His made his senior debut came in a World Cup qualifier against the Netherlands Antilles in June 2008. He played five games in the qualification for the 2010 FIFA World Cup, and was a member of the Haitian team for the CONCACAF Gold Cup in 2009.
