= Gordon Chin =

Canadian soccer player

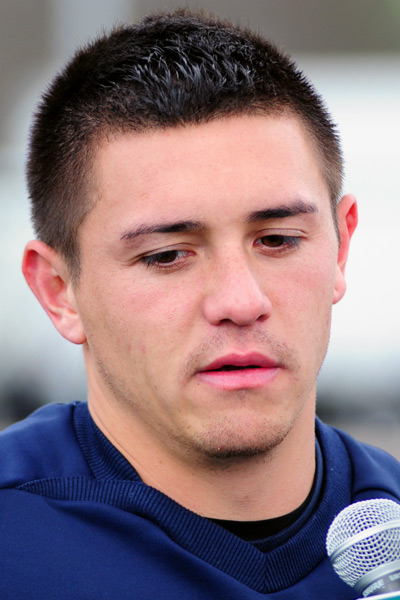
- Chin in 2009

Personal information
- Date of birth: March 26, 1983 (age 43)
- Place of birth: Burnaby, British Columbia, Canada
- Height: 5 ft 6 in (1.68 m)
- Position: Midfielder

Youth career
- 1999–2001: Portsmouth

Senior career*
Years	Team	Apps	(Gls)
2003	Vancouver Whitecaps	14	(0)
2004	Edmonton Aviators	25	(3)
2004–2005	Halifax Town	9	(1)
2006	Toronto Lynx	24	(0)
2006–2007	Baltimore Blast (indoor)	17	(1)
2007	Charleston Battery	27	(2)
2008–2009	Yantai Yiteng	10	(0)
2009	Vancouver Whitecaps	25	(1)
2009	→ Whitecaps Residency (loan)	1	(2)
2010	Port Coquitlam Premier		

International career^{‡}
2001–2003	Canada U-19	10	(1)
2002–2003	Canada U-20	21	(1)
2002–2003	Canada U-23	4	(1)
2004	Canada futsal	2	(1)
- * Club domestic league appearances and goals as of 2 February 2010 ‡ National team caps and goals as of 23 March 2009

Gordon Chin (simplified Chinese: 陈珩琛; traditional Chinese: 陳珩琛; pinyin: Chén Héngchēn; born March 26, 1983) is a Canadian former soccer player. He is of partial Chinese descent.

Primarily a midfielder, Chin has played professionally in Canada, England, the United States and China, and has represented Canada internationally at various youth levels, including at the 2003 FIFA U-20 World Cup.

== Career ==
=== Youth ===
Chin began playing at the youth level with local sides Metro-Ford Benfica and Metro Burnaby. He trained abroad and had tryouts throughout Europe with teams such as R.S.C. Anderlecht, Liverpool, and Manchester City. After training at the Canadian Professional Soccer Academy in Vancouver he was offered and signed a three-year deal to play at the academy level with Portsmouth in 1999.

=== A-League ===
After his apprenticeship in Portsmouth, he returned to Vancouver in 2002 to play in the city's local circuit league the Pacific Coast Soccer League with Vancouver Explorers. After the conclusion of the PCSL season, he was drafted by the Vancouver Whitecaps in the USL A-League draft in late December 2002. He signed a contract with Vancouver for the 2003 season. Before the commencement of the regular season, he assisted Vancouver in winning the preseason tournament known as the Canterbury Cup. In his debut season in the A-League, he appeared in 14 matches.

In order to accumulate more playing time, he was traded to league rivals Edmonton Aviators the following season. Throughout the season he was named to the league's team of the week. Unfortunately, the Edmonton franchise experienced a tumultuous season as the ownership abandoned the club which caused the league to take over the operations of the club.

=== Europe ===
Once the season concluded Edmonton folded and Chin traveled abroad to Scotland to try out with St Johnstone. After failing to secure a contract in Scotland he signed with Halifax Town in the English Conference National in November 2004. In his single season in England, he played nine games and scored a single goal before being released in April 2005.

=== USL First Division ===
In 2006, he returned to the USL circuit by signing with Toronto Lynx along with Rick Titus, and Osni Neto. In his debut season with Toronto, he appeared in 24 matches. He also assisted Toronto and played in the Open Canada Cup final against Ottawa St. Anthony Italia where Toronto was defeated. After the relegation of Toronto to the Premier Development League, he transitioned to indoor soccer to play with the Baltimore Blast for the MISL's 2006–07 season. He also played in the United States in 2007 with Charleston Battery for a season.

=== China ===
In March 2008, he transferred to China, his grandfather's motherland, and signed with Yantai Yiteng of the China Jia League. The team was relegated at the end of the season and Chin had an agreement to play with Changsha Ginde the following season. After a change in management at Ginde, he was overlooked by the new management and was later invited to train with the Whitecaps on their spring training tour in Africa.

=== Vancouver ===
After impressing the Vancouver management staff he was signed to a one-year contract. His debut was delayed because he didn't receive his transfer papers from his previous club in time. Throughout the season he played in several matches in the 2009 Canadian Championship.

In February 2010, the Whitecaps released him along with several other players. After his release from Vancouver, he played with Port Coquitlam Premier FC in the Vancouver Metro Soccer League.

== International career ==
Chin has represented Canada internationally as a member of the under-20 and under-23 teams. He was a member and co-captain of the Canada under-20 squad that qualified for the 2003 FIFA U-20 World Cup. He played in the quarterfinal match where Spain eliminated Canada from the tournament.

In 2004, he was selected to the Canada national futsal team for the 2004 CONCACAF Futsal Championship Qualifying Playoff. He played in both matches against Panama.
