= Pablo Vitti =

Argentine footballer

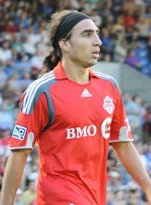
- Vitti with Toronto FC in 2009

Personal information
- Full name: Pablo Ernesto Vitti
- Date of birth: 9 July 1985 (age 41)
- Place of birth: Rosario, Argentina
- Height: 1.78 m (5 ft 10 in)
- Position: Forward

Youth career
- Rosario Central

Senior career*
Years	Team	Apps	(Gls)
2003–2006	Rosario Central	74	(13)
2006–2008	Banfield	15	(0)
2008–2009	Independiente	3	(0)
2008	→ Chornomorets Odesa (loan)	6	(1)
2009	→ Toronto FC (loan)	26	(2)
2010	Universidad San Martín	36	(14)
2011–2012	Universitario de Deportes	17	(3)
2012	→ Querétaro (loan)	5	(2)
2012–2013	→ LDU Quito (loan)	38	(13)
2013–2015	Tigre	26	(5)
2015	San Martín de San Juan	14	(3)
2016	All Boys	9	(0)
2016	Veria	12	(2)

International career
2005	Argentina U20	3	(0)
- * Club domestic league appearances and goals

Pablo Vitti (born 9 July 1985) is an Argentine footballer who plays as striker. Vitti played for different clubs both in his country and abroad, including Ukraine, Canada, Mexico and Ecuador. He is known for his dribbling and finishing ability.

== Career ==
=== Professional ===
Vitti started his career at hometown club Rosario Central. He made his breakthrough into the canallas first team in 2004, where he was a consistent goal scorer and was rewarded with the number 10 shirt. Vitti was considered one of the most promising youngsters in the Argentine First Division, but his progression has been halted slightly in recent seasons. He left his hometown club in 2006 to go to Banfield, but he only made fifteen appearances for Banfield without scoring a single goal.

After moving to Independiente he was quickly loaned to Ukrainian Premier League club Chornomorets Odesa. His stay in Odesa was brief, and on 9 February 2009, it was announced that Toronto FC of Major League Soccer had signed Vitti on a loan.

Pablo Vitti scored his first goal for Toronto FC on 24 June 2009 vs. New York Red Bulls. Vitti wore the captain's armband for Toronto FC in an international friendly vs. his fellow countrymen from River Plate at BMO Field on 22 July 2009. He scored 2 goals in 26 MLS games for Toronto in 2009, and returned to Independiente at the end of the season.

After being released by Toronto FC Vitti signed with Peruvian top flight club Universidad San Martín in mid-January. He scored his first goal for the club in a 4–1 over Inti Gas Deportes 6 March 2010. San Martin won the 2010 Torneo Descentralizado with Vitti playing an integral role all season scoring 15 goals in all competitions.

Most considered Vitti to be the best player in the Peruvian League during the 2010 season, earning him a three-year contract with the most successful team in Peru Universitario de Deportes.

In December 2015 it was announced that Vitti would become the joining Ratchaburi in the Thai Premier League.

On 9 August 2016, Vitti signed a one-year contract with Super League Greece side Veria.

=== International ===
Vitti was an integral part of the Argentina U20 squad that won the 2005 FIFA World Youth Championship in the Netherlands. Vitti's time with the Argentina youth programs he was considered to be one of Argentina's top prospects on the same level as Lionel Messi and Sergio Agüero his teammates on the winning U-20 team.

== Honours ==
=== Club ===
Toronto FC

- Canadian Championship (1): 2009

Universidad San Martín

- Peruvian Primera División (1): 2010

=== International ===
Argentina

- FIFA U-20 World Cup (1): 2005
