= Adrian Serioux =

Canadian soccer player (born 1979)

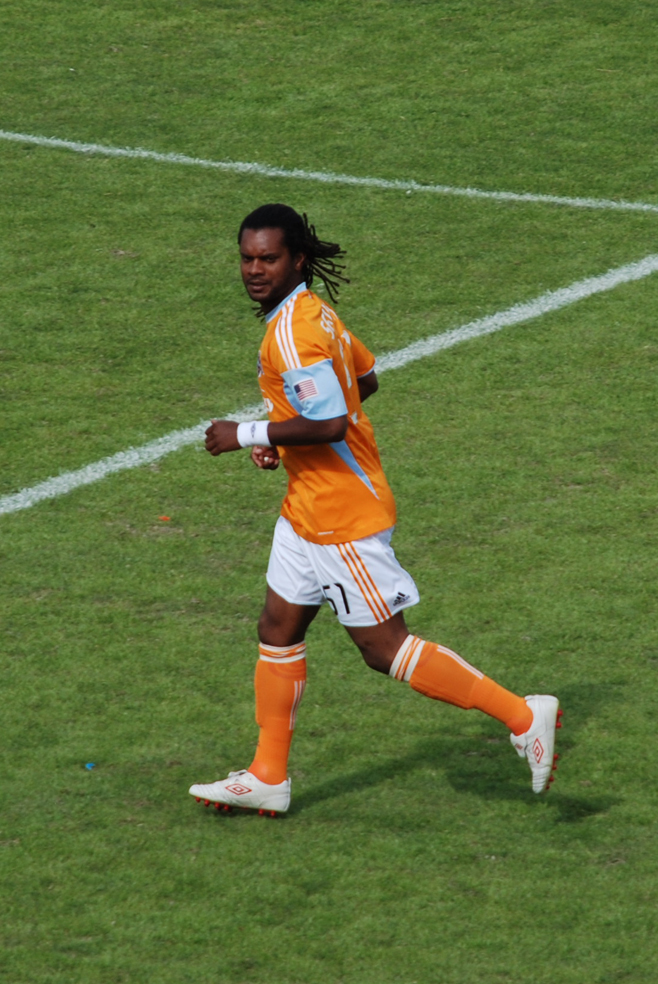
- Serioux with Houston Dynamo

Personal information
- Date of birth: May 12, 1979 (age 47)
- Place of birth: Scarborough, Ontario, Canada
- Height: 6 ft 0 in (1.83 m)
- Position: Defender

Youth career
- 1998–1999: New Haven Chargers

Senior career*
Years	Team	Apps	(Gls)
1999–2004	Toronto Lynx	116	(2)
2002	→ Mississauga Olympians (loan)	4	(1)
2004–2005	Millwall	24	(0)
2006	Houston Dynamo	20	(1)
2007–2008	FC Dallas	34	(0)
2009	Toronto FC	26	(2)
2010	Houston Dynamo	13	(2)
Total		233	(7)

International career
2004–2009	Canada	19	(1)
- * Club domestic league appearances and goals

Adrian Serioux (born May 12, 1979) is a Canadian retired professional soccer player who played as a defender.

== Club career ==
After playing college soccer for the University of New Haven, Serioux started his pro career with the Toronto Lynx in the A-League. After the 2002 A-League season came to a conclusion he was loaned to the Mississauga Olympians of the Canadian Professional Soccer League. He made his debut on September 11, 2002, in an Open Canada Cup match against the Toronto Croatia in a 1–1 draw. He would record his first goal for the club on October 4, 2002, in a 4–3 victory over Vaughan Sun Devils. Serioux helped the Olympians secure a playoff berth by finishing second in the Western Conference, but were defeated by the North York Astros in a wild card match, where he failed to show up for the match.

He then moved to England to join Millwall. Serioux is known to have one of the longest throws in the sport, once setting up a goal against Leicester City, from a throw-in at the halfway line. Opponents tend to stay close to him at throw-ins, he once got himself sent off by throwing the ball at Lee Cook's face from close range during a game against Queens Park Rangers.

=== Major League Soccer ===
Serioux joined the MLS in March 2006, signing with the MetroStars, leaving England in order to take care of his ill mother. However, he never played for the club, and was traded to Houston Dynamo in exchange for Danny O'Rourke before the regular season started. After one season with Houston, where Serioux played well and helped the team to the MLS Cup, he was drafted by Toronto FC in 2006 MLS Expansion Draft. He stayed with Toronto for only a few hours before being dealt to FC Dallas for Ronnie O'Brien. In his first season with FC Dallas he was held to only ten games because of a serious injury.

In May 2008, Serioux was fined $1,000 for a dangerous tackle on David Beckham, after telling The Sun newspaper that he and a few other players would be "going after" the England international midfielder.

Serioux was traded to Toronto FC on February 24, 2009, for a first round pick and allocation money.

Serioux's contract was not renewed by Toronto FC for the 2010 MLS Season. Houston Dynamo traded a third round 2011 MLS SuperDraft pick for his rights.

After the 2010 MLS season Houston declined Serioux's contract option and he elected to participate in the 2010 MLS Re-Entry Draft. Serioux became a free agent in Major League Soccer when he was not selected in the Re-Entry draft.

== International career ==
He made his debut for Canada in an August 2004 World Cup qualification match against Guatemala. By December 2009, he earned a total of 19 caps, scoring one goal. He has so far represented Canada in eight FIFA World Cup qualification matches.

== Career statistics ==
Scores and results list Canada's goal tally first, score column indicates score after each Serioux goal.

List of international goals scored by Adrian Serioux
No.	Date	Venue	Opponent	Score	Result	Competition
1	6 September 2008	Saputo Stadium, Montreal, Canada	Honduras	1–0	1–2	2010 FIFA World Cup qualification

== Honours ==
Houston Dynamo

- Major League Soccer MLS Cup: 2006
- Major League Soccer Western Conference Championship: 2006

Toronto FC

- Canadian Championship: 2009
