= Wes Knight =

American soccer player (born 1986)

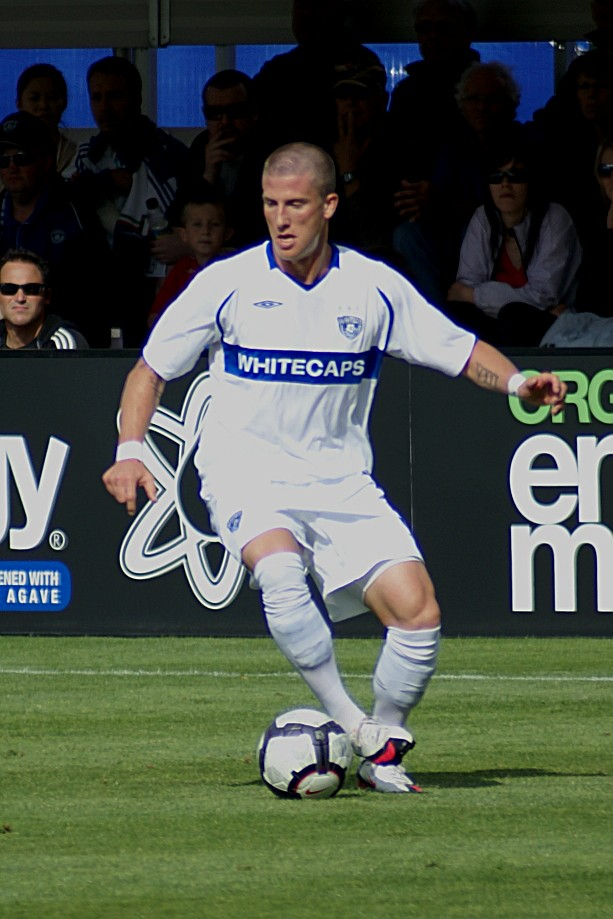

Personal information
- Full name: Wesley Knight
- Date of birth: September 6, 1986 (age 40)
- Place of birth: Easley, South Carolina, U.S.
- Height: 5 ft 11 in (1.80 m)
- Positions: Defender; midfielder

Youth career
- 2004–2008: College of Charleston Cougars

Senior career*
| Years | Team | Apps | (Gls) |
| 2007 | Bradenton Academics | 9 | (0) |
| 2009–2010 | Vancouver Whitecaps | 58 | (0) |
| 2011 | Vancouver Whitecaps FC | 12 | (0) |
| 2011 | → Vancouver Whitecaps FC U-23 (loan) | 2 | (0) |
| 2012 | San Antonio Scorpions | 27 | (0) |
| 2013 | FC Edmonton | 3 | (1) |
| 2015 | Carolina RailHawks | 16 | (0) |
- * Club domestic league appearances and goals as of October 15, 2015

Wes Knight (born September 6, 1986) is an American retired soccer player.

== Career ==
=== College and amateur ===
Knight attended Wren High School and played club soccer for the Greenville Futbol club, and played college soccer at the College of Charleston from 2004 to 2008, where he was named to the second team All-Southern Conference and to the NSCAA All-South Region second team as a junior and first team All-Southern Conference and NSCAA All-South Region second team as a senior. Following his senior season, Knight was one of 64 distinguished collegiate players to be invited to the Major League Soccer Combine. He was just the second player from the College of Charleston to be invited since the MLS's existence, behind former standout defender Drew Cavanagh in 2005.

During his college years Knight also played for the Bradenton Academics in the USL Premier Development League.

=== Professional ===
On February 11, 2009, the Whitecaps announced the signing of Knight for the 2009 season. Knight made his USL-1 debut during the 2–1 away defeat to Puerto Rico Islanders on Apr. 18. The defender replaced Vicente Arze in the second half of the match in the Caribbean. Three days later, Knight made his first league start and earned his first USL-1 point when he assisted on Marco Reda's goal during Vancouver's 1–1 draw at Austin Aztex. On May 10, Knight earned a spot in the USL-1 Team of the Week for Week Five after assisting on Charles Gbeke's winning goal, as the Whitecaps claimed a 1–0 victory at home to Puerto Rico Islanders. He then made the USL-1 Team of the Week for Week 10 after assisting on both of Gbeke's goals during a 3–2 home win over Miami FC Blues on June 12.

Knight remained with Vancouver Whitecaps FC when the club joined Major League Soccer in 2011 but was released by the club on August 31, 2011. In the 2012 pre-season, Knight was on trial with Real Salt Lake.

In 2012, Knight signed with NASL side San Antonio Scorpions.

On January 8, 2013, Knight signed with FC Edmonton of the NASL. Ahead of the 2015 season, Knight joined the Carolina RailHawks and started in their first game, a 3–1 win over Ottawa.

On July 30, 2015, Knight announced that he would be retiring from the game following Carolina RailHawks game against Tampa Bay Rowdies on August 1, 2015.

== Career statistics ==
| Club | Season | USL-1 | | | Playoffs | | | Cup | | | CONCACAF Champions League | | | Total | | |
| Club | Season | Apps | Goals | Assists | Apps | Goals | Assists | Apps | Goals | Assists | Apps | Goals | Assists | Apps | Goals | Assists |
|---|---|---|---|---|---|---|---|---|---|---|---|---|---|---|---|---|
| Vancouver Whitecaps FC | 2009 | 29 | 0 | 8 | 6 | 0 | 1 | 4 | 0 | 0 | 0 | 0 | 0 | 39 | 0 | 9 |
| Vancouver Whitecaps FC | 2010 | 29 | 0 | 1 | 4 | 0 | 0 | 4 | 0 | 0 | 0 | 0 | 0 | 37 | 0 | 1 |
