= Carol Anne Chénard =

Canadian soccer referee (born 1977)

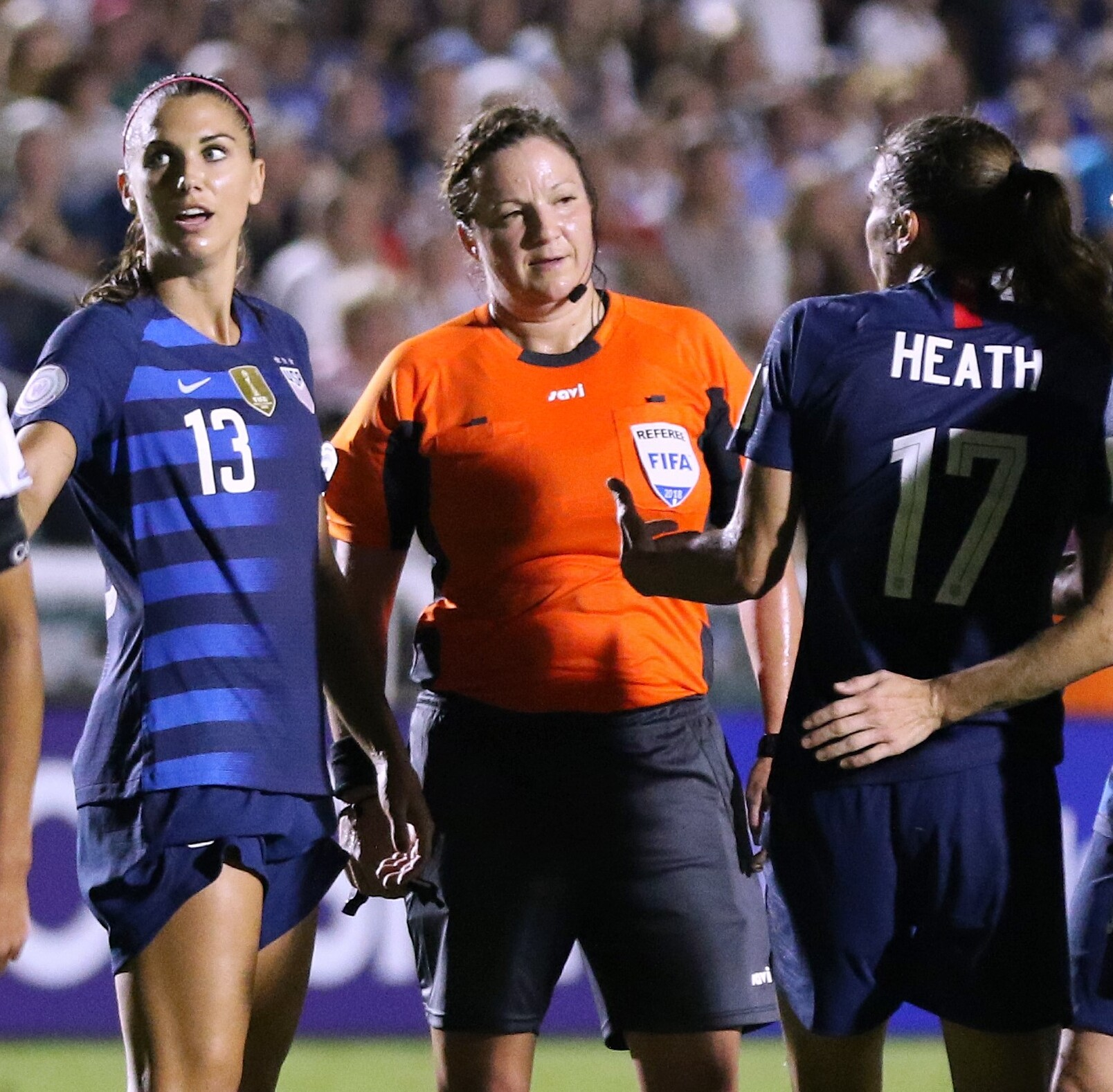
- Chenard in 2018
- Born: 17 February 1977 (age 49); Summerside, Prince Edward Island, Canada
- Other occupation: Microbiologist with Health Canada

Domestic
Years	League	Role
2019–2020	CPL	Referee
2021–present	MLS	Video Match Official
Unknown	USL W-League (1995–2015)	Referee

International
Years	League	Role
2005–2020	FIFA listed	Referee
2021–2023	FIFA listed	Video Official

Carol Anne Chénard (born 17 February 1977) is a Canadian soccer referee and VAR. She officiated at two FIFA Women's World Cups and two Olympic Gamess.

== Personal life ==
Chénard was born in Summerside, Prince Edward Island, and grew up in Ottawa. She studied microbiology and immunology at McGill University, receiving her Bachelor of Science in 2001 and PhD in 2007.

== Career ==
She has been described as "one of Canada’s most experienced female referees".

On October 13, 2020, she announced her national and international retirement. She later returned as a video match official in 2021 and remained on the FIFA panel until 2023.

=== Honors ===
- Quebec Soccer Federation (QSF) Elite Referee, 2004
- QSF Referee of Excellence, 2005, 2006, 2007
- Ray Morgan Memorial Award, 2009, 2017
- International Achievement Award, 2016
- CONCACAF Female Referee of the Year, 2016

=== Notable appointments ===
- FIFA List, Referee, 2006–2020
- FIFA Panel, Video Match Official, 2021-2023
- Canada Soccer List, Referee, 2005-2020
- 2004 Jubilee Trophy Final, Assistant Referee
- 2005 Jubilee Trophy Final, Referee
- 2006 USL W-League Final
- 2011 and 2015 FIFA Women’s World Cup, Referee
- 2012 and 2016 Olympic Games, Referee
- 2017 FIFA U-17 World Cup, Referee
- 2018 CONCACAF Women's U-20 Championship, Referee,
- 2018 FIFA U-20 Women's World Cup, Referee
- 2019 Women's World Cup ^{[Note 1]}
- 2022 CONCACAF Women's Championship, VAR
- 2022 FIFA U-17 Women's World Cup, VAR
- 2023 FIFA Women's World Cup, VAR and AVAR
- 2023 FIFA Women's World Cup final, Standby VAR
- 2025 MLS Cup, VAR

== Notes ==
Note 1.^{^} Withdrew shortly before the competition following a diagnosis of breast cancer.
