= Lyle Martin =

American soccer player (born 1985)

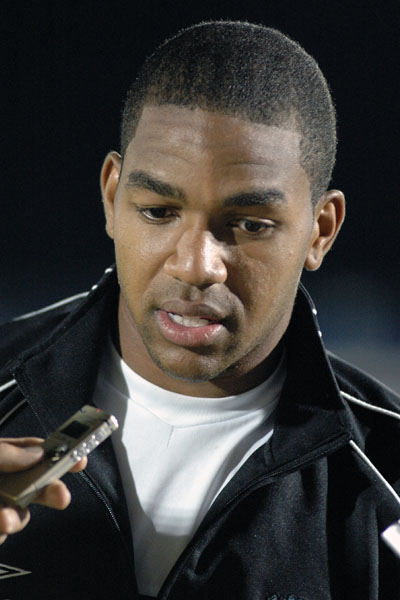

Personal information
- Date of birth: March 25, 1985 (age 41)
- Place of birth: Bakersfield, California, United States
- Height: 6 ft 1 in (1.85 m)
- Position: Defender

Youth career
- 2004–2006: Bakersfield Roadrunners

Senior career*
Years	Team	Apps	(Gls)
2005–2006	Bakersfield Brigade	26	(14)
2007–2009	Vancouver Whitecaps	64	(2)
2010	Shaanxi Chan-Ba	5	(1)
2010	Wuhan Zall	13	(3)
2011	Beijing Baxy	13	(0)
2013	San Antonio Scorpions	16	(0)
2014	Chivas USA	0	(0)
- * Club domestic league appearances and goals as of April 10, 2014

Lyle Martin (born March 25, 1985) is an American soccer player.

== Career ==
=== College and amateur ===
Martin made his debut in the football field in 2004, and played college soccer at California State University, Bakersfield, appearing in 79 career games and scoring 29 goals. In his senior year, he earned the 2006 California Collegiate Athletic Association goal-scoring title with 17 goals in 19 matches, which paved the way for him to become the second most single-season goals in school history.

During his college years he also played for Bakersfield Brigade of the USL Premier Development League, scoring five goals in 10 games in his rookie season in 2005, and playing in 16 matches and scoring nine goals in 2006.

=== Professional ===
Martin was drafted by Chivas USA in the 2007 MLS Supplemental Draft, but signed instead with the Vancouver Whitecaps of the USL First Division. In his first season, in Vancouver he earned 19 starts in 24 games and played 1,657 minutes, and was honored with the Whitecaps Newcomer of the Year award. On October 12, 2008, he helped the Whitecaps capture their second USL First Division championship, beating the Puerto Rico Islanders 2–1.

On December 18, 2008, the Whitecaps announced the contract extensions of Martin and Wesley Charles for the 2009 season.

Martin was released by the Whitecaps at the end of the 2009 season.

Martin moved to China with his former teammate Charles Gbeke and signed a contract with Chinese Super League side Shaanxi Chanba in February 2010. He is the first American footballer to play for a Chinese professional football club. He played as a forward in China and scored his first goal for Shaanxi on 25 April, in a 3–2 home win against Shenzhen Ruby. He was released by Shaanxi in June 2010 and signed a contract with China League One side Hubei Luyin in July. In March 2011, Martin transferred to Beijing Baxy. He was released in the summer of 2011.

Martin signed with NASL club San Antonio Scorpions on December 19, 2012.

On April 10, 2014, Martin signed with Chivas USA.

== Honors ==
=== Vancouver Whitecaps ===
- USL First Division Championship (1): 2008
