= Ethan Gage =

Canadian soccer player (born 1991)

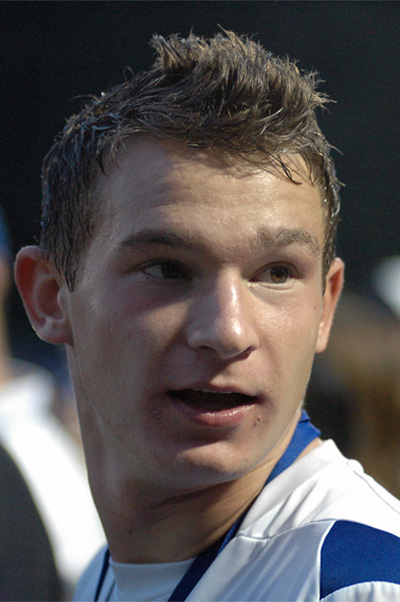

Personal information
- Date of birth: May 8, 1991 (age 35)
- Place of birth: Cochrane, Alberta, Canada
- Height: 5 ft 11 in (1.80 m)
- Position: Midfielder

Team information
- Current team: Banyule City

Youth career
- 2007: Vancouver Whitecaps

Senior career*
Years	Team	Apps	(Gls)
2008	Whitecaps Residency	16	(2)
2008–2010	Vancouver Whitecaps	30	(0)
2009	→ Whitecaps Residency (loan)	1	(0)
2010	→ Whitecaps Residency (loan)	13	(0)
2011–2012	Reading	0	(0)
2012–2014	Nyköping	46	(4)
2015	Bærum	10	(0)
2017–2018	Nyköping	10	(2)
2018	Bentleigh Greens	12	(0)
2019	South Melbourne	12	(0)
2019–2021	Caroline Springs George Cross	21	(0)
2022–	Banyule City	17	(0)

International career
2008–2011	Canada U20	11	(0)
- * Club domestic league appearances and goals as of 5 December 2022

Ethan Gage (born May 8, 1991) is a Canadian soccer player who currently plays for Victorian State League Division 1 side Caroline Springs George Cross FC.

== Club career ==
=== Youth ===
Born in Cochrane, Alberta, Gage won a gold medal with Alberta at the 2007 BMO Financial Group U16 Boys National All-Star Championship and won a gold medal with the Calgary Elbow Valley Villains at the 2007 BMO National Championships U-16 adidas Cup Boys Club Championship in Sherwood Park, Alberta.

=== Professional ===
Gage was a member of the Vancouver Whitecaps Residency team which won the 2008 USL Premier Development League Southwest Division title in 2008. On August 15, 2008, following the conclusion of the 2008 PDL season, he was called up to the senior Vancouver Whitecaps squad.

On January 31, 2011, Gage signed with Reading in the English Football League Championship.

After being released by Reading, Gage signed for Swedish Division 2 Södra Svealand side Nyköping.

Gage joined Norwegian side Bærum SK on January 22, 2015.

Moving to Australia in early 2018, Gage initially joined Victorian State League Division 2 North-West side Corio SC, before moving up three divisions to join National Premier Leagues Victoria side Bentleigh Greens SC in the mid-season transfer window.

After an impressive first season in Australia, Gage signed for rival club NPL club South Melbourne for the 2019 season. Gage was released in the mid-season transfer window, subsequently moving to Victorian State League Division 1 side Caroline Springs George Cross FC.

== International career ==
Gage was a part of the Canada U-16 camps in 2007, and has Gage has also captained the Canada men's national soccer team at the U-17 and U-20 levels.

Gage was awarded in December 2010 the Canadian men's U-20 Player of the Year for the first time, Nana Attakora had won the award the previous two years.

== Honors ==
=== Vancouver Whitecaps ===
- USL First Division Championship: 2008

=== Individual ===
- Canadian U-20 Player of the Year: 2010

== Club statistics ==
Season	Team	League	Domestic League		Domestic Playoffs		Domestic Cup		Continental Championship		Total	
Season	Team	League	Apps	Goals	Apps	Goals	Apps	Goals	Apps	Goals	Apps	Goals
2008	Vancouver Whitecaps FC	USL-1	6	0	4	0	-	-	-	-	10	0
2009	Vancouver Whitecaps FC	USL-1	17	0	-	-	4	1	-	-	21	1
2010	Vancouver Whitecaps FC	USSF D-2	7	0	4	0	-	-	-	-	11	0
2015	Bærum	OBOS-ligaen	1	0	1	0	-	-	-	-	2	0
Career Total			31	0	9	0	4	1	-	-	44	1

Updated: March 10, 2015.
