= Félix Brillant =

Canadian soccer player

Personal information
- Full name: Félix Brillant Jr.
- Date of birth: September 9, 1980 (age 46)
- Place of birth: Brossard, Quebec, Canada
- Height: 5 ft 6 in (1.68 m)
- Position: Midfielder

Youth career
- 2000–2002: AS Cannes
- 2002–2003: Franklin Pierce Ravens

Senior career*
Years	Team	Apps	(Gls)
2002–2003	Cape Cod Crusaders	20	(1)
2004	New England Revolution	19	(1)
2005–2006	Virginia Beach Mariners	33	(2)
2007	Sparta Sarpsborg	21	(11)
2008–2009	Montreal Impact	21	(2)
2009	Trois-Rivières Attak	4	(0)
2010	Lasalle-Lakeshore United		

International career
1997–1999	Canada U-17	6	(0)

Managerial career
- 2019-: Antoine de Saint Exupéry Mustangs (Assistant Coach)
- * Club domestic league appearances and goals as of 30 November 2009

Félix Brillant (born September 9, 1980, in Brossard, Quebec) is a Canadian former soccer player who played as a midfielder and later became a soccer coach.

== Career ==
=== Youth and amateur ===
Brillant began his career in the youth system of French team AS Cannes, but never appeared for the senior side. He returned to North America in 2002, and played college soccer for at Franklin Pierce College in the NCAA Division II, where he was named All-New England Region four times.

In 2002 and 2003 he also played for Cape Cod Crusaders in the USL Premier Development League, with whom he won back-to-back PDL championships.

=== Professional ===
Brillant was drafted 56th overall by the New England Revolution in the 2004 MLS Superdraft and scored a goal in the 2004 season for the Revs, but was released in June 2005 without making an appearance that season.

Brillant played for the Virginia Beach Mariners in the USL First Division in 2005 and 2006, and then played midfield for Sparta Sarpsborg of the Adeccoligaen in 2007.

On July 30, 2008, Brillant signed a contract with the Montreal Impact of the United Soccer League. During the 2008 season Brillant helped the team move up in the USL First Division standings. In 11 games, including four starts, Brillant tallied five points, all on August 24, in a 3–1 win against Atlanta Silverbacks. He also took part in six of the eight games that the Impact played in the CONCACAF Champions League.

On December 2, 2008, the Montreal Impact announced the re-signing of Brillant to a two-year contract. During the 2009 USL season Brillant contributed by helping the Impact clinch a playoff spot under new head coach Marc Dos Santos. He helped the Impact reach the finals where Montreal would face the Vancouver Whitecaps, this marking the first time in USL history where the final match would consist of two Canadian clubs. In the final Brillant helped the Impact win the series 6–3 on aggregate. The victory gave the Impact their third USL Championship and also the victory marked Brillant's first USL Championship. On November 30, 2009, Brillant was released by the Impact, and joined the reserve team Trois-Rivières Attak in the Canadian Soccer League.

=== International ===
Brillant played for the Canadian national U-17 team in the late 1990s. He was on the bench for Canada's FIFA World Cup Qualifier against Guatemala on 13 October 2004, but did not play in the game.

== Managerial career ==
In 2020, he was named the assistant coach under head coach Nicolas Gagnon for the Montreal Impact U-17 team. He was re-signed for the 2022 season and was also named the academy's senior educator of the cub's scouting and development centre.

== Honors ==
=== Cape Cod Crusaders ===
- USL Premier Development League Champions (1): 2003
