= Zanzan Atte-Oudeyi =

Togolese footballer

Personal information
- Full name: Mohammed Zanzan Atte-Oudeyi
- Date of birth: September 2, 1980 (age 46)
- Place of birth: Lomé, Togo
- Height: 5 ft 9 in (1.75 m)
- Position: Midfielder

Senior career*
| Years | Team | Apps | (Gls) |
| 2001 | JS du Ténéré | | |
| 2002 | Satellite FC | | |
| 2002–2003 | Germinal Beerschot | 7 | (0) |
| 2003–2006 | Lokeren | 32 | (1) |
| 2006–2008 | FC Brussels | 29 | (1) |
| 2008–2009 | CS Otopeni | 1 | (0) |
| 2009 | Montreal Impact | 12 | (0) |

International career
| 1999–2006 | Togo | 36 | (2) |
- * Club domestic league appearances and goals as of 30 November 2009

Mohammed Zanzan Atte-Oudeyi (commonly known simply as Zanzan; born September 2, 1980, in Lomé) is a retired Togolese footballer.

== Career ==
=== Club ===
Zanzan began his career playing for JS du Ténéré in the Niger Premier League and for Satellite FC in Côte d'Ivoire, before moving to play in Belgium in 2002.

Zanzan played for six years in the Belgian First Division, for Germinal Beerschot, Lokeren and FC Brussels, and briefly played in the Romanian Liga I for Otopeni, before continuing his career in North America.

On April 15, 2009, Zanzan signed with Montreal Impact of the USL First Division. He played 12 games for the Canadian team before leaving at the end of November 2009. In 2012, he signed a contract at amateur team FC Eksaarde In Belgium. Which is 3rd division.

=== International ===
Zanzan has been a regular with the Togolese national team since 1999, having made his debut when he was just 19 years old. He was part of the Togo squad at the 2006 Africa Cup of Nations.
