= Marco Vélez =

Puerto Rican footballer (born 1980)

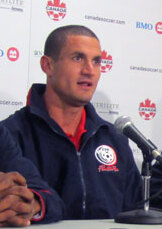
- Velez in 2011

Personal information
- Date of birth: June 26, 1980 (age 46)
- Place of birth: Carolina, Puerto Rico
- Height: 6 ft 2 in (1.88 m)
- Position: Defender

Youth career
- 1997–1999: IMG Soccer Academy
- 1999–2001: Barry Buccaneers

Senior career*
Years	Team	Apps	(Gls)
2002	Bradenton Academics	14	(1)
2003–2004	Seattle Sounders	52	(7)
2005–2007	Puerto Rico Islanders	73	(3)
2008–2009	Toronto FC	38	(2)
2009–2012	Puerto Rico Islanders	48	(1)

International career^{‡}
2004–2012	Puerto Rico	14	(1)

Managerial career
- 2012: Puerto Rico Islanders (assistant)
- 2015: Bayamón FC
- 2016–2017: Puerto Rico FC (assistant)
- 2017–2018: Puerto Rico FC
- 2018: Bayamón FC
- 2018–2019: Puerto Rico (assistant)
- 2019: Puerto Rico U17
- 2019-21: Bayamón FC (assistant)
- 2021–: Puerto Rico Surf SC
- * Club domestic league appearances and goals as of October 17, 2019 ‡ National team caps and goals as of October 17, 2019

Marco Vélez (born June 26, 1980, in Carolina) is a Puerto Rican former footballer who played as a defender and currently works as coach for Puerto Rico Surf SC.

== Career ==
=== Youth and college ===
Vélez began playing soccer at an early age in Puerto Rico with Colegio San Jose, but moved to Nick Bollettieri's IMG Soccer Academy when in high school. He then attended Barry University from 1999 to 2001, playing on the men's soccer team. During his freshman and sophomore years he was named first team All Conference.

=== Professional ===
Vélez was drafted by the MetroStars in the 2003 MLS SuperDraft, but decided to sign with the Seattle Sounders of the USL First Division instead of playing in Major League Soccer. While a defender in college, Vélez played as a forward during the 2003 season, before returning to the back line in 2004. He helped the Sounders reach the league finals in 2004.

Vélez signed with the Puerto Rico Islanders in 2005, where he scored 2 goals in 22 games playing as a defender. During the 2006 season, Vélez was instrumental in the Islanders' run to the playoffs and their qualification for the CONCACAF Champions Cup, the first time in team history they had qualified for either tournament. Vélez was selected to be the Islanders' captain during the CONCACAF Champions Cup qualifiers.

During the 2007 season, Vélez scored one goal and added one assist in twenty-seven games. His everyday play as defender was crucial to the Islanders advancing for the first time in team history to the USL Semi-Finals. Velez led the Islanders in matches and minutes played.

In July 2007, the California Cougars of Major Indoor Soccer League drafted Vélez in the sixth round (49th overall) of the league's supplemental draft., but he never played for the team.

Vélez transferred from the Puerto Rico Islanders to Toronto FC in 2008, and in doing so became the first native Puerto Rican to participate in MLS. He made his MLS debut on 29 March 2008 in a 2–0 defeat to Columbus Crew. In his first season in Major League Soccer, Vélez started all the games in which he participated.

Toronto FC released Marco on August 13, 2009 and returned to his former club Puerto Rico Islanders. Vélez left Toronto with 38 appearances, 31 of those as a starter. The defender compiled 2,753 minutes and finished his time with the club with two goals, four cautions, and two ejections. In 2010, he re-signed with the Islanders.

=== International ===
Vélez made his debut for the Puerto Rico national football team in 2004, and was named captain of the team by coach Colin Clarke in 2008. He scored his first and only goal at the 2012 Caribbean Cup against Dominican Republic.

=== Coaching career ===
While playing his last season in the Puerto Rico Islanders, he also served as assistant coach. In 2013 he assisted Jeaustin Campos with the Puerto Rico U-15 national football team. In 2015 he coached Bayamón FC. In 2016 he was appointed assistant coach for Puerto Rico FC. He served as assistant coach until early 2017 when he took charge as interim head coach. After finishing the season with Puerto Rico FC, the team announced that it wasn't coming back for the 2018 season. In January 2018, he returned as head coach for Bayamón FC.

In June 2018, he took the role of assistant coach of the Puerto Rico national football team after former Toronto FC teammate Amado Guevara was appointed as head coach.

In December 2018, Amado Guevara confirmed that Marco Vélez will coach the Puerto Rico national under-17 football team during 2019 World Cup Qualification.

== Honors ==
=== Player ===
==== Toronto FC ====
- Canadian Championship Winner (1): 2009

==== Puerto Rico Islanders ====
- USSF Division 2 Pro League Champions (1): 2010
- CFU Club Championship::Winner (1): 2010

=== Coach ===
==== Bayamón FC ====
- Puerto Rican Football Federation Preparatory Tournament Champions (1): 2018
