= Kevin Harmse =

Canadian soccer player (born 1984)

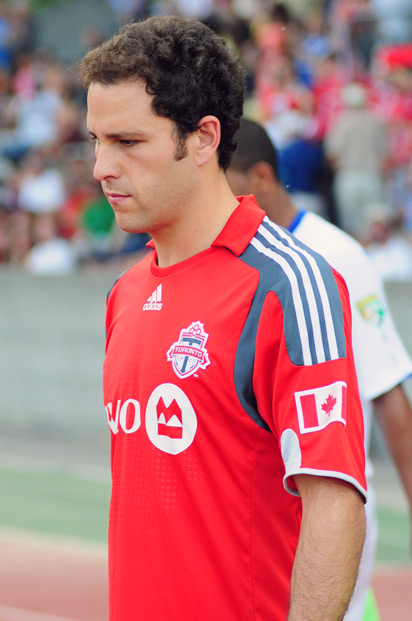
- Harmse in 2009

Personal information
- Full name: Kevin Mitchell Harmse
- Date of birth: July 4, 1984 (age 42)
- Place of birth: Johannesburg, South Africa
- Height: 1.88 m (6 ft 2 in)
- Position: Defensive midfielder

Youth career
- 1995–2000: Roman Tulis School
- 1995–2000: Coquitlam Metro-Ford SC

Senior career*
Years	Team	Apps	(Gls)
2003	Tromsø	2	(0)
2004–2005	Vancouver Whitecaps	36	(1)
2006–2007	Nitra	13	(0)
2007	Los Angeles Galaxy	17	(1)
2008–2009	Toronto FC	28	(0)
2009	Chivas USA	0	(0)
2011	Vancouver Whitecaps FC	3	(0)
2012–2013	San Antonio Scorpions	39	(1)

International career^{‡}
2007–2008	Canada	9	(0)

Managerial career
- 2014–2026: Simon Fraser Red Leafs (assistant)
- 2026–: Simon Fraser Red Leafs
- * Club domestic league appearances and goals as of October 4, 2013 ‡ National team caps and goals as of December 13, 2009

Kevin Mitchell Harmse (born July 4, 1984) is a former professional soccer player and coach. Born in South Africa, he represented Canada internationally.

== Club career ==
=== Youth years ===
Born in Johannesburg, Harmse grew up in Vancouver, British Columbia, and began his youth career training at the Roman Tulis School in Coquitlam, British Columbia.

=== Europe ===
Harmse was drafted by the Vancouver Whitecaps in 2002 but did not sign with the club; instead, after training with both Bayern Munich and Benfica, he signed with Tromsø IL in the Norwegian Premier League. He did not see much playing time and returned to the Whitecaps in 2004, where he gradually worked himself to become a cornerstone of the defense, playing in 36 games and scoring once.

He signed for Nitra in the Slovak First Football League in 2006, spending a year with the club.

=== Major League Soccer ===
Harmse returned to North America and signed with Los Angeles Galaxy of Major League Soccer in April 2007. He made his MLS debut on April 12, 2007, coming on at halftime against FC Dallas. He scored his first goal for the club on April 28, 2007, against Chivas USA.

Harmse was traded to Toronto FC in March 2008 for a fourth-round draft pick. Harmse was used by the club as a central defender for much of the 2008 and part of the 2009 seasons. He scored his first goal for Toronto FC in the 2009 Nutrilite Canadian Championship opening game against his former team, the Vancouver Whitecaps, on May 6, 2009, at BMO Field.

Harmse was traded to Chivas USA for allocation money on June 24, 2009, but did not feature in any games in his debut season with the team.

On January 21, 2010, Chivas traded Harmse to Houston Dynamo for a conditional third- or fourth-round draft pick in the 2012 MLS SuperDraft.

Due to Harmse not being able to train with the club in pre-season due to a recurring injury, Houston opted to waive him on March 9, 2010.

Harmse was officially signed by Vancouver Whitecaps FC on March 25, 2011, but was waived on June 10, having played in just three MLS games for the club.

On December 13, 2011, it was announced that Harmse signed with the expansion side San Antonio Scorpions of the North American Soccer League.

== International career ==
Harmse played an important part in the Canadian U-20 team that made it to the quarterfinals in the 2003 FIFA World Youth Championship. He also played for the U-23 team that failed to qualify for the 2004 Olympics.

He made his debut with the senior Canada national team on March 25, 2007, against Bermuda. By December 2009, he earned a total of 9 caps, scoring no goals. He has represented Canada in 3 FIFA World Cup qualification matches.

== Managerial career ==
He joined the Simon Fraser Red Leafs coaching staff as an assistant coach in 2014.

In 2026, Simon Fraser Red Leafs elevated Harmse from assistant coach to head coach.

== Honours ==
=== Toronto FC ===
- Canadian Championship: 2009
