= Chris Cummins (football manager) =

English football manager

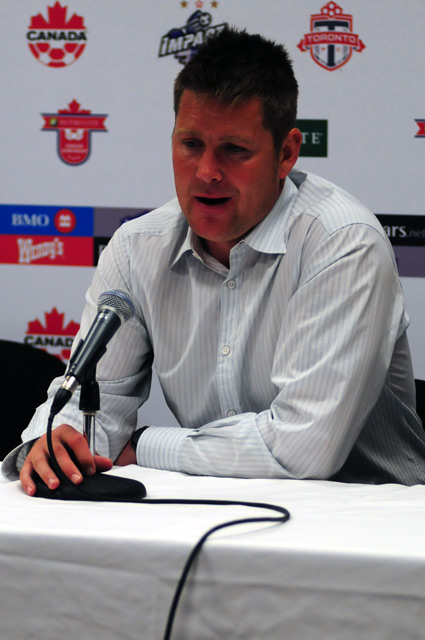
- Cummins in June 2009

Personal information
- Date of birth: 18 October 1971 (age 55)
- Place of birth: Watford, England

Team information
- Current team: Chester-le-Street Town (manager)

Managerial career
- Years: Team
- 1996–2007: Watford Academy (Director of Youth Football)
- 2007–2008: Luton Town (Director of Youth Football)
- 2009: Toronto FC (Interim Head Coach)
- 2011–2013: Reading (Development Coach)
- 2019–2022: Kings Langley
- 2023–2025: Chester-le-Street Town

Chris Cummins (born 17 February 1972) is an English football coach.

== Youth development ==
Cummins began his professional career in 1996 with Watford as the youth development coordinator. Hired at Watford by former England manager, Graham Taylor, he was later promoted to Watford's assistant academy manager in 1998 and went on to become director of youth – youth and reserve team. He left Watford in January 2007 and as one of the longest-serving members of staff.

One of Cummins' greatest achievements at Watford was the development of forward Ashley Young. Young played under Cummins from the age of ten, and in January 2007, Young was sold to Premiership side Aston Villa for £9.6 million, Watford's record transfer fee.

Cummins joined Luton Town in July 2007, as Director of Youth Football and spent eight months there before accepting an offer from Toronto FC. In April 2011, Cummins took up a full-time coaching role for Reading as their development coach, tasked with developing the younger members of the squad while managing the 'Reading XI' youth/reserve team. He left Reading in May 2013 after the club decided not to renew his contract.

== Managerial career ==
=== Toronto FC ===
On 9 May 2008, he joined Toronto FC as first assistant to then manager John Carver. He was officially named interim head coach on 29 April 2009 following Carver's resignation. He won the Canadian Soccer Championship's Voyageurs Cup in 2009 (Toronto's first honour) in a 6–1 victory over Montreal, beating Vancouver by one goal in goal differential. He left the club after the 2009 MLS Season since his wife and children were not able to get working visas in Canada, and moved back to the UK.

In his first extensive interview since leaving Toronto FC, Cummins was quoted as saying, "In every club I've been at, you need to look up top, and you need to ask advice and get their help at times and, I don't think I got that" He went on to say "Johnston interfered with the lineup selection for game days, favouring a three-man defensive unit instead of Cummins' preferred four-man formation. Additionally, he often waited until late in the week to have these discussions with the coach. "I'd go out there 30, 40 minutes late for a training session because we were arguing about the team," and he said there was a division that season between the club's Canadian and American players, although Johnston disavowed any such knowledge at the end of the season. As well, Cummins said players held their tongues around Johnston. "The players won't say what they feel when Mo's around," and he went on to say "assistant coach Nick Dasovic was told he was going to be named Carver's replacement before the official announcement made Cummins the interim boss. Cummins said MLSE chairman and part owner Larry Tanenbaum made a phone call wishing Dasovic well for becoming the first Canadian coach in Major League Soccer" (although Frank Yallop has coached American MLS sides).

== Managerial stats ==
Team	From	To	Record				
Team	From	To	G	W	L	D	Win %
Toronto FC	29 April 2009	24 October 2009	31	12	11	8	38.71

== Honours ==
Toronto FC

- Canadian Championship: 2009
