= 2008 United Soccer Leagues =

The 2008 season was the 22nd edition of the United Soccer Leagues.

The season kicked off on Friday, April 12 with two First Division games, as the Charleston Battery visited Miami FC and the Montreal Impact visited the Vancouver Whitecaps.

== General ==
- Changes in the First Division: the California Victory take the 2008 season off, leaving 11 teams playing a 30-game schedule.
- Changes in the Second Division: the Pittsburgh Riverhounds return from hiatus, and Real Maryland FC join as an expansion team. However, the Cincinnati Kings and New Hampshire Phantoms drop to the PDL. 10 teams play a 20-game schedule this season.
- In the PDL, 5 teams withdrew for the 2008 season, while 7 expansion teams and the two voluntary relegations increase the league to 67 teams in 10 divisions across 4 conferences. Teams play a 16-game league schedule.

== Honors ==
Competition	Champion	Runner-up	Regular season champion/Best USL team
USL First Division	Vancouver Whitecaps	Puerto Rico Islanders	Puerto Rico Islanders
USL Second Division	Cleveland City Stars	Charlotte Eagles	Charlotte Eagles
USL PDL	Thunder Bay Chill	Laredo Heat	Michigan Bucks
U.S. Open Cup	D.C. United (MLS)	Charleston Battery (USL-1)	Charleston Battery
Canadian Championship	Montreal Impact	Toronto FC (MLS)	n/a

== Standings ==
=== First Division ===
USL First Division
- Season: 2008
- Champions: Vancouver Whitecaps (2nd Title)
- Regular Season title: Puerto Rico Islanders (1st Title)
- Matches: 165
- Goals: 381 (2.31 per match)
- Best Player: (Northern Ireland) Jonathan Steele, Puerto Rico Islanders
- Top goalscorer: (Brazil) Alex Afonso, Miami FC (15 goals)
- Best goalkeeper: Bill Gaudette, Puerto Rico Islanders

Pos	Team	Pld	W	L	D	GF	GA	GD	Pts	Qualification
1	Puerto Rico Islanders	30	15	6	9	43	23	+20	54	Commissioner's Cup, bye to semifinal round of playoffs
2	Vancouver Whitecaps (C)	30	15	7	8	34	28	+6	53	First round of playoffs
3	Montreal Impact	30	12	12	6	33	28	+5	42	First round of playoffs
4	Rochester Rhinos	30	11	10	9	35	32	+3	41 (Note: Rochester deducted 1 point for use of an ineligible player on August 10, 2008)	First round of playoffs
5	Charleston Battery	30	11	12	7	34	36	−2	40 (Note: CHA: 4 pts; SEA: 4 pts)	First round of playoffs
6	Seattle Sounders	30	10	10	10	37	36	+1	40	First round of playoffs
7	Minnesota Thunder	30	10	11	9	40	38	+2	39	First round of playoffs
8	Carolina RailHawks	30	9	11	10	34	43	−9	37	
9	Miami FC	30	8	12	10	28	34	−6	34 (Note: MIA: 7 pts; ATL: 1 pt)	
10	Atlanta Silverbacks	30	8	12	10	37	50	−13	34	
11	Portland Timbers	30	7	13	10	26	33	−7	31	

Rules for classification: Tie-breaker order: 1. Head-to-head points; 2. Total wins; 3. Goal difference; 4. Goals for; 5. Lottery
(C) Playoff Champion

==== Playoffs ====
Teams were re-seeded for semifinal matchups
Vancouver was selected by the league to host the final despite being the lower seeded team

First round September 26/28
6	Seattle Sounders	2	1	3
3	Montreal Impact	1	3	4
7	Minnesota Thunder	0	4	4
2	Vancouver Whitecaps	2	3	5
5	Charleston Battery	0	1	1
4	Rochester Rhinos	2	0	2

Semi-finals; October 3/5
3	Montreal Impact	1	0	1
2	Vancouver Whitecaps	0	2	2
4	Rochester Rhinos	2	0	2
1	Puerto Rico Islanders (a.e.t)	0	3	3

Final; October 12
2	Vancouver Whitecaps	2
1	Puerto Rico Islanders	1

==== First Round ====
September 26, 2008
7:35 PM EDT
First Leg

Rochester Rhinos	2–0	Charleston Battery
Ball (yellow card) 49'; Guppy 86'; Delicate 90'; Bertz (yellow card) 90'	Report

PAETEC Park
Rochester, New York
Attendance: 6,923
Referee: Chris Penso
September 28, 2008
7:00 PM EDT
Second Leg

Charleston Battery	1–0	Rochester Rhinos
Alonso 12'; Fuller (yellow card) 42'	Report	Palguta (yellow card) 41'; Smith (yellow card) 53'; Gregor (yellow card) 61'

Blackbaud Stadium
Charleston, South Carolina
Attendance: 2,131
Referee: Doug Wolff

Rochester Rhinos won 2–1 on Aggregate.

September 26, 2008
10:00 PM EDT
First Leg

Seattle Sounders	2–1	Montreal Impact
Alcaraz-Cuellar 15' (yellow card) 75'; O'Brien 42' (pen.); Besagno (yellow card) 51'; Gardner (yellow card) 61'; Sakuda (yellow card) 78'	Report	Pesoli 21' (yellow card) 71' (yellow-red card) 83'; Braz (yellow card) 86'; Brown (yellow card) 90'

Starfire Sports Complex
Tukwila, Washington
Attendance: 2,865
Referee: Edvin Jurisevic
September 28, 2008
5:00 PM EDT
Second Leg

Montreal Impact	3–1	Seattle Sounders
Lorenzo (yellow card) 31'; Testo (yellow card) 45' (goal) 56'; Braz (yellow card) 68' (yellow-red card); Placentino 75'; Ribeiro 90'	Report	Levesque 59' (red card) 74'; Alcaraz-Cuellar (yellow card) 62'; Jackson (red card) 90'; O'Brien (red card) 90'

Saputo Stadium
Montreal, Quebec
Attendance: 11,134
Referee: Mauricio Navarro

Montreal Impact won 4–3 on Aggregate.

September 26, 2008
10:00 PM EDT
First Leg

Vancouver Whitecaps	2–0	Minnesota Thunder
Greenfield 27' (o.g.); Sebrango (yellow card) 58'; Hirano (yellow card) 73'; Moose 89'	Report	Schulte (yellow card) 31'; Cvilikas (yellow card) 76'

Swangard Stadium
Burnaby, British Columbia
Attendance: 4,943
Referee: Carol Anne Chenard
September 28, 2008
6:05 PM EDT
Second Leg

Minnesota Thunder	4–3	Vancouver Whitecaps
Gonzalez 23'; Tarley 64' (yellow card) 73'; Sánchez (red card) 77'; deRoux 78'; Moojen 90' (pen.); Schulte (yellow card) 90'	Report	Valente 3'; Nash 44'; Sebrango 55'

National Sports Center
Blaine, Minnesota
Attendance: 3,811
Referee: NA

Vancouver Whitecaps won 5–4 on Aggregate.

==== Semifinals ====
October 3, 2008
7:35 PM EDT
First Leg

Rochester Rhinos	2–0	Puerto Rico Islanders
Smith (yellow card) 18'; Gregor 63'; Menyongar 78'; Fitzpatrick (yellow card) 90'	Report	Krause (yellow card) 33'; Miranda (red card) 36'; Jones (yellow card) 36' (yellow-red card) 90'

PAETEC Park
Rochester, New York
Attendance: 7,001
Referee: Niko Bratsis
October 5, 2008
6:00 PM EDT
Second Leg

Puerto Rico Islanders	3–0 (a.e.t.)	Rochester Rhinos
Noel 10'; Atieno 33'; Steele (yellow card) 40'; Telesford (yellow card) 70'; Arrieta 119'	Report	Earls (yellow card) 32'

Juan Ramón Loubriel Stadium
Bayamón, Puerto Rico
Attendance: 9,112
Referee: Tony Russo

Puerto Rico Islanders won 3–2 on Aggregate in Extra Time.

October 3, 2008
8:00 PM EDT
First Leg

Montreal Impact	1–0	Vancouver Whitecaps
Ribeiro (yellow card) 52' (goal) 61'; Aguilera (yellow card) 88'	Report	Charles (yellow card) 29'; Nolly (red card) 52'

Saputo Stadium
Montreal, Quebec
Attendance: 12,002
Referee: Steve DePiero
October 5, 2008
6:30 PM EDT
Second Leg

Vancouver Whitecaps	2–0	Montreal Impact
Moose (yellow card) 10'; Clarke 37'; Sebrango 41'; Charles (yellow card) 56'; Addlery (yellow card) 81'	Report	Testo (yellow card) 40'; Pizzolitto (yellow card) 48'; Gatti (yellow card) 64'; Braz (yellow card) 80'

Swangard Stadium
Burnaby, British Columbia
Attendance: 4,992
Referee: Dave Gantar

Vancouver Whitecaps won 2–1 on Aggregate.

==== Final ====
October 12, 2008
7:00 PM EDT
Second Leg

Vancouver Whitecaps	2–1	Puerto Rico Islanders
Gbeke 55', 74'; Kindel (yellow card) 71'	Report	Gbandi 68'

Swangard Stadium
Burnaby, British Columbia
Attendance: 5,822
Referee: Mark Kadlecik

USL First Division
2008 Champions
(Canada)
Vancouver Whitecaps FC
Second title

==== Awards and All-League Teams ====
First Team
F: (Brazil) Alex Afonso (Miami FC) (Leading Goalscorer); (Senegal) Macoumba Kandji (Atlanta Silverbacks)
M: (Cuba) Osvaldo Alonso (Charleston Battery); (Jamaica) Stephen deRoux (Minnesota Thunder); (Canada) Martin Nash (Vancouver Whitecaps); (Northern Ireland) Jonathan Steele (Puerto Rico Islanders) (MVP)
D: Cristian Arrieta (Puerto Rico Islanders) (Defender of the Year); (United States) Taylor Graham (Seattle Sounders); (United States) David Hayes (Atlanta Silverbacks); (Canada) Nevio Pizzolitto (Montreal Impact)
G: Bill Gaudette (Puerto Rico Islanders) (Goalkeeper of the Year)
Coach: (Northern Ireland) Colin Clarke (Puerto Rico Islanders) (Coach of the Year)

Second Team
F: (France) Sebastien Le Toux (Seattle Sounders); (Cuba) Eduardo Sebrango (Vancouver Whitecaps)
M: (Argentina) Leonardo Di Lorenzo (Montreal Impact); (Liberia) Johnny Menyongar (Rochester Rhinos); (Mexico) Ricardo Sanchez (Minnesota Thunder); (England) Matt Watson (Carolina RailHawks)
D: (Saint Vincent and the Grenadines) Wesley Charles and (Japan) Takashi Hirano (Vancouver Whitecaps); (New Zealand) Cameron Knowles (Portland Timbers); (United States) Scott Palguta (Rochester Rhinos)
G: (United States) Matt Jordan (Montreal Impact)

=== Second Division ===
USL Second Division
- Season: 2008
- Champions: Cleveland City Stars (1st Title)
- Regular Season title: Charlotte Eagles (1st Title)
- Matches: 100
- Goals: 301 (3.01 per match)
- Best Player: (United States) Dustin Swinehart, Charlotte Eagles
- Top goalscorer: (United States) Dustin Swinehart, Charlotte Eagles (16 goals)
- Best goalkeeper: (Puerto Rico) Terry Boss, Charlotte Eagles

Pos	Team	Pld	W	L	D	GF	GA	GD	Pts	Qualification
1	Charlotte Eagles	20	13	2	5	45	15	+30	44	Regular season champion
2	Richmond Kickers	20	14	4	2	48	20	+28	44	Qualified for playoffs
3	Cleveland City Stars (C)	20	10	3	7	33	16	+17	37	Qualified for playoffs
4	Crystal Palace Baltimore	20	11	8	1	30	30	0	34	Qualified for playoffs
5	Harrisburg City Islanders	20	7	3	10	33	20	+13	31	Qualified for playoffs
6	Western Mass Pioneers	20	5	9	6	19	29	−10	20 (Note: Western Mass and Real Maryland deducted 1 point)	Qualified for playoffs
7	Wilmington Hammerheads	20	4	9	7	32	33	−1	19	
8	Pittsburgh Riverhounds	20	4	10	6	25	37	−12	18	
9	Bermuda Hogges	20	5	13	2	21	50	−29	17	
10	Real Maryland Monarchs	20	3	15	2	15	51	−36	10	

(C) Playoff Champion

==== Playoffs ====
First Round; August 13
4	Crystal Palace Baltimore (AET/PK)	2 (7)
5	Harrisburg City Islanders	2 (6)
3	Cleveland City Stars	4
6	Western Mass Pioneers	2

Semifinals; August 16
1	Charlotte Eagles	2
4	Crystal Palace Baltimore	1
2	Richmond Kickers	0
3	Cleveland City Stars(AET)	1

Final; August 23
1	Charlotte Eagles	1
3	Cleveland City Stars	2

==== First round ====
August 13, 2008
7:00 PM EDT

Cleveland City Stars	4–2	Western Mass Pioneers
Schulte 14'; Bundu 23', 89'; Hlavaty (yellow card) 32'; Otieno 69'; Sarkodie (yellow card) 81'; Ruud (yellow card) 88'	Report	Augustine (yellow card) 13'; Deren 16'; Molinari (yellow card) 34' (yellow-red card) 68'; Krause (yellow card) 43' (goal) 64'; Wrona (red card) 44'; Klinger (yellow card) 66'

Krenzler Field
Cleveland, Ohio
Attendance: 1,683
Referee: Chris Penso (United States)

August 13, 2008
7:30 PM EDT

Crystal Palace Baltimore	2–2 (a.e.t.)	Harrisburg City Islanders
Brooks 10'; Healey 30'; Teixeira (yellow card) 59'	Report	Heins 14'; Oduor 75'; Schofield (yellow card) 119'
Penalties
Harada (penalty scored); Harkin (penalty missed); Teixeira (penalty scored); Healey (penalty scored); Lookingland (penalty scored); Brooks (penalty scored); Marshall (penalty scored); Flores (penalty scored)	7–6	(penalty scored) Heins; (penalty missed) Pelletier; (penalty scored) Marples; (penalty scored) Schofield; (penalty scored) Bixler; (penalty scored) Fisher; (penalty scored) Bloes; (penalty missed) Calvano

UMBC Stadium
Catonsville, Maryland
Attendance: 1,352
Referee: Bryan Roslund (United States)

==== Semifinals ====
August 16, 2008
7:00 PM EDT

Charlotte Eagles	2–1	Crystal Palace Baltimore
Herrera 48' (pen.); Swinehart 51'; Woods (yellow card) 65'; Long (yellow card) 70'; Boss (red card) 90'	Report	Harada 5'; Teixeira (yellow card) 54'; Brooks (yellow card) 59'

Restart Field
Charlotte, North Carolina
Attendance: 1,188
Referee: Jeff Muschik

August 16, 2008
7:00 PM EDT

Richmond Kickers	0–1 (a.e.t.)	Cleveland City Stars
Nyzamba (yellow card) 30'; Bulow (yellow card) 67'; Gorres (yellow card) 77'; Jones (yellow card) 101'	Report	Ruud 99'; Sella (yellow card) 108'

University of Richmond Stadium
Richmond, Virginia
Attendance: 2,693
Referee: Daniel Stead

==== Final ====
August 23, 2008
8:00 PM EDT

Cleveland City Stars	2–1	Charlotte Eagles
Otieno 15'; Bundu 39'; Schulte (yellow card) 66'; Leibbrandt (yellow card) 89'	Report	Long (yellow card) 17'; Swinehart (yellow card) 52'; Shak (yellow card) 65'; Kabwe 87'; Smith (yellow card) 90'

Krenzler Field
Cleveland, Ohio
Attendance: 2,016
Referee: Jason Krnac

==== Awards and All-League team ====
First Team
F: (Colombia) Jorge Herrera (Charlotte Eagles); (South Africa) Boyzzz Khumalo (Pittsburgh Riverhounds); (United States) Dustin Swinehart (Charlotte Eagles) (league MVP)
M: (United States) Mike Burke (Richmond Kickers); (United States) Floyd Franks (Cleveland City Stars); (Japan) Shintaro Harada (Crystal Palace Baltimore)
D: (United States) Brady Bryant and (United States) Steve Shak (Charlotte Eagles); (Germany) Sascha Gorres (Richmond Kickers); (United States) Mark Schulte (Cleveland City Stars) (Defender of the Year)
G: Terry Boss (Charlotte Eagles)
Coach: (United States) Mark Steffens (Charlotte Eagles) (Coach of the Year)
Rookie of the Year: (Zimbabwe) Stanley Nyazamba (Richmond Kickers)

Second Team
F: (Jamaica) Gary Brooks (Crystal Palace Baltimore); (Sierra Leone) Sallieu Bundu (Cleveland City Stars); (United States) Jeff Deren (Western Mass Pioneers)
M: (United States) Trey Alexander (Wilmington Hammerheads); (United States) Justin Evans (Pittsburgh Riverhounds); (Cameroon) Matthew Mbuta (Crystal Palace Baltimore)
D: (United States) Dustin Bixler (Harrisburg City Islanders); (United States) Trevor McEachron (Richmond Kickers); (Argentina) Federico Molinari (Western Mass Pioneers); (Jamaica) Dame Walters (Wilmington Hammerheads)
G: (United States) Ronnie Pascale (Richmond Kickers)

=== Premier Development League ===
- See 2008 PDL Season
