= 2010 Montreal Impact season =

Montreal Impact
2010 season
- Chairman: Joey Saputo
- Head coach: Marc Dos Santos
- USSF Division 2 Pro League: NASL Conference: 3rd Overall: 6th
- D2 Pro League Playoffs: Semifinals
- Canadian Championship: 3rd
- Top goalscorer: League: Ryan Pore (15); All: Ali Gerba (9)
- Highest home attendance: 13,034
- Lowest home attendance: 10,864
- Average home league attendance: 12,397
Home colours	Away colours	Third colours

The 2010 Montreal Impact season was the 17th season of the franchise and the team played in the USSF Division 2 Pro League.

== Conference table ==
NASL Conference
Pos	Team	Pld	W	L	T	GF	GA	GD	Pts	Qualification
1	Carolina RailHawks FC	30	13	9	8	44	32	+12	47	Conference leader, qualified for playoffs
2	Vancouver Whitecaps FC	30	10	5	15	32	22	+10	45	Qualified for playoffs (Note: The remaining six teams with the highest point totals, regardless of conference, also advance to the playoffs.)
3	Montreal Impact	30	12	11	7	36	30	+6	43	Qualified for playoffs
4	Miami FC	30	7	11	12	37	49	−12	33	
5	AC St. Louis	30	7	15	8	32	48	−16	29	
6	Crystal Palace Baltimore	30	6	18	6	24	55	−31	24	

Source: USSF D-2 schedule table

== Players ==
Note: Flags indicate national team as defined under FIFA eligibility rules; some limited exceptions apply. Players may hold more than one non-FIFA nationality.

No.	Pos.	Nation	Player
1	GK	USA	Matt Jordan
2	DF	MAR	Hicham Aâboubou
3	DF	CAN	Adam Braz
5	DF	CAN	Nevio Pizzolitto (captain)
6	DF	FRA	Richard Pelletier
7	MF	USA	David Testo
8	MF	POR	Filipe Pastel
9	MF	CAN	Rocco Placentino
10	FW	CAN	Ali Gerba
11	MF	ARG	Leonardo Di Lorenzo
12	FW	CUB	Eduardo Sebrango
14	MF	USA	Tony Donatelli
15	MF	CAN	Patrick Leduc
16	DF	VIN	Wesley Charles

No.	Pos.	Nation	Player
17	FW	FRA	Anthony Le Gall
18	FW	CAN	Marco Terminesi
19	FW	CAN	Reda Agourram
21	MF	FRA	Philippe Billy
22	GK	CAN	Srdjan Djekanović
23	MF	JAM	Stephen deRoux
24	DF	CAN	Simon Gatti
26	MF	CAN	António Ribeiro
30	MF	CAN	Pierre-Rudolph Mayard
32	MF	CAN	Kevin Cossette
34	MF	CAN	Bastien Bourgault
40	GK	ROU	Andrei Bădescu
48	GK	CAN	Dominic Provost

=== Multiple nationalities ===
- (Morocco) (Canada) Hicham Aâboubou
- (Cuba) (Canada) Eduardo Sebrango
- (Romania) (Canada) Andrei Bădescu
- (Serbia) (Canada) Srdjan Djekanović

=== List of 2010 transfers ===
==== In ====
Note: Flags indicate national team as defined under FIFA eligibility rules; some limited exceptions apply. Players may hold more than one non-FIFA nationality.

No.	Pos.	Nation	Player
6	MF	CAN	Tyler Hemming (Trade with Charleston Battery)
6	DF	FRA	Richard Pelletier (signed as a free agent, last club Stade Brestois 29)
8	MF	POR	Filipe Pastel (signed as a free agent, last club C.D. Feirense)
10	FW	CAN	Ali Gerba (signed as a free agent, last club Toronto FC)
16	DF	VIN	Wesley Charles (signed as a free agent, last club Vancouver Whitecaps)
17	FW	FRA	Anthony Le Gall (signed as a free agent, last club Stade Brestois 29)

No.	Pos.	Nation	Player
18	FW	CAN	Marco Terminesi (signed as a free agent, last club Minnesota Thunder)
19	FW	CAN	Reda Agourram (signed as a free agent, last club Trois-Rivières Attak)
21	MF	FRA	Philippe Billy (signed as a free agent, last club Stade Brestois 29)
26	MF	CAN	António Ribeiro (signed as a free agent, last club San Jose Earthquakes)
32	MF	CAN	Kevin Cossette (on loan from Montreal Impact Academy)
40	GK	ROU	Andrei Bădescu (signed as a free agent, last club Trois-Rivières Attak)

==== Out ====
Note: Flags indicate national team as defined under FIFA eligibility rules; some limited exceptions apply. Players may hold more than one non-FIFA nationality.

No.	Pos.	Nation	Player
--	DF	TOG	Zanzan (to FC Molenbeek Brussels Strombeek, contract expired)
--	MF	CAN	Mauro Biello (Retired)
--	MF	CAN	Félix Brillant (to Lasalle-Lakeshore United, contract expired)
--	MF	USA	Joey Gjertsen (to San Jose Earthquakes, contract expired)
--	MF	ITA	Stefano Pesoli (to A.S. Casale Calcio, Released)
--	MF	CAN	Tyler Hemming (Traded to the Austin Aztex)

No.	Pos.	Nation	Player
--	MF	USA	Ciaran O'Brien (to Colorado Rapids, loan expired)
--	MF	USA	Leighton O'Brien (Retired)
--	DF	CAN	Alex Surprenant (to FC Edmonton, contract expired)
--	DF	FRA	Cédric Joqueviel (to Castelnau Le Crès FC, Personal reasons)
--	FW	PAN	Roberto Brown (to San Francisco F.C., Released)
--	FW	ANT	Peter Byers (to Parham, Released)

==== Players out on loan ====
Note: Flags indicate national team as defined under FIFA eligibility rules; some limited exceptions apply. Players may hold more than one non-FIFA nationality.

No.	Pos.	Nation	Player
30	MF	CAN	Pierre-Rudolph Mayard (at Charleston Battery until August 13, 2010)

== International caps ==
Players called for international duty during the 2010 season while under contract with the Montreal Impact.

Nationality	Position	Player	Date of birth	Caps (Goals)	Most Recent Call up
(Panama)	FW	Roberto Brown	1977-06-15	40 (14)	v Chile, January 20, 2010
(Canada)	MF	Tyler Hemming	1985-05-09	2 (0)	v Jamaica, January 31, 2010
(Canada)	GK	Srdjan Djekanović	1983-01-08	0 (0)	v Jamaica, January 31, 2010

== Awards ==
=== Team awards ===
Award	Name
MVP	(France) Philippe Billy
Defensive Player of the Year	(France) Philippe Billy
Unsung Hero	(United States) Tony Donatelli
Newcomer of the Year	(Canada) Ali Gerba

=== League awards ===
Award	Name
Player of the Month (August)	(Canada) Ali Gerba
USSF D2 Best XI	(Canada) Ali Gerba

== Matches ==
=== Preseason ===
Win Tie Loss

February 24, 2010	Freamunde	1 – 5	Montreal Impact	Freamunde, Portugal
	Simon Gatti 14' OG	(report)	Roberto Brown 13'; Filipe Pastel 26'; Pierre-Rudolph Mayard 78'; Rocco Placentino 83'; Reda Agourram 90'	Stadium: Complexo Desportivo do SC Freamunde

March 3, 2010	Celta Vigo	2 – 1	Montreal Impact	Vigo, Spain
	Dimitrios Papadopoulos 19'; Gastón Cellerino 65'	(report)	Reda Agourram 24'	Stadium: Estadio Balaídos

March 4, 2010	Boavista	1 – 1	Montreal Impact	Porto, Portugal
	Alex Machado 44'	(report)	Eduardo Sebrango 19'	Stadium: Estádio do Bessa

March 20, 2010	Rochester Rhinos	1 – 0	Montreal Impact	Rochester, New York, USA
	Tyler Rosenlund 9'	(report)		Stadium: Marina Auto Stadium

March 24, 2010	Charleston Battery	1 – 1	Montreal Impact	Cary, North Carolina, USA
	Tommy Heinemann 39'	(report)	Hicham Aâboubou 87'	Stadium: WakeMed Soccer Park

March 27, 2010	Carolina RailHawks FC	1 – 1	Montreal Impact	Cary, North Carolina, USA
	Kupono Low 69'	(report)	Nevio Pizzolitto 82'	Stadium: WakeMed Soccer Park

March 27, 2010	Wake Forest	0 – 2	Montreal Impact	Cary, North Carolina, USA
		(report)	Reda Agourram 31'; Roberto Brown 84'	Stadium: WakeMed Soccer Park

=== USSF Division II regular season ===
April 11, 2010	Austin Aztex FC	2 – 0	Montreal Impact	Austin, Texas, USA
	Lawrence Olum 18'; Lawrence Olum (yellow card) 18'; Jamie Watson 66'; Kieron Bernard (yellow card) 85'	(report)	Adam Braz (yellow card) 58'; Peter Byers (yellow card) 86'	Stadium: House Park; Attendance: 2,642; Referee: Matt Jozaitiz

April 25, 2010	Montreal Impact	1 – 1	Portland Timbers	Montreal
	Filipe Pastel (yellow card) 43'; Nevio Pizzolitto (yellow card) 45'; Adam Braz (yellow card) 65'; David Testo (yellow card) 70'; Nevio Pizzolitto 81'	(report)	Steve Purdy (yellow card) 22'; Ryan Pore (yellow card) 65'; Ryan Pore 67'; James Marcelin (yellow card) 74'; Quavas Kirk (yellow card) 79'	Stadium: Saputo Stadium; Attendance: 13,034; Referee: John Oliva

May 1, 2010	Montreal Impact	1 – 0	Puerto Rico Islanders	Montreal
	Filipe Pastel 70'; Rocco Placentino (yellow card) 73'; Tony Donatelli (yellow card) 81'	(report)	Chris Nurse (yellow card) 57'	Stadium: Saputo Stadium; Attendance: 11,554; Referee: Mauricio Navaro

May 8, 2010	Montreal Impact	2 – 1	NSC Minnesota Stars	Montreal
	Adam Braz (yellow card) 45'; Rocco Placentino 79'; Rocco Placentino 90'; Rocco Placentino (yellow card) 90'	(report)	Kyle Altman (yellow card) 31'; Leilei Gao (yellow card) 63'; Kevin Friedland (red card) 69'; Brian Cvilikas 78'; Johnny Menyongar (yellow card) 82'	Stadium: Saputo Stadium; Attendance: 12,265; Referee: Mike Edmunds

May 15, 2010	Vancouver Whitecaps	0 – 0	Montreal Impact	Burnaby, British Columbia, Canada
	Marcus Haber (yellow card) 63'; Cornelius Stewart (yellow card) 73'; Randy Edwini-Bonsu (yellow card) 90'	(report)	Hicham Aaboubou (yellow card) 31'; Filipe Pastel (yellow card) 60'	Stadium: Swangard Stadium; Attendance: 5,177; Referee: Justin Tasev

May 19, 2010	Portland Timbers	0 – 1	Montreal Impact	Portland, Oregon, USA
		(report)	Tony Donatelli 31'; Eduardo Sebrango (yellow card) 48'; Stephen deRoux (yellow card) 80'; Filipe Pastel (yellow card) 82'	Stadium: PGE Park; Attendance: 6,573; Referee: Fotis Bazakos

May 30, 2010	Montreal Impact	0 – 2	Carolina RailHawks FC	Montreal
	Filipe Pastel (yellow card) 78'	(report)	Etienne Barbara 20'; Etienne Barbara (yellow card) 40'; Josh Gardner (yellow card) 76'; Andriy Budnyy 90'; Andriy Budnyy (yellow card) 90'	Stadium: Saputo Stadium; Attendance: 13,034; Referee: Alain Ruch

June 6, 2010	Montreal Impact	1 – 1	Miami FC	Montreal
	Tony Donatelli 23'; Rocco Placentino (yellow card) 85'; Hicham Aaboubou (yellow card) 90'	(report)	Christian Gomez 9'; Sean Cameron (yellow card) 52'; Martyn Lancaster (yellow card) 60'; Ariel Germiniani (yellow card) 75'	Stadium: Saputo Stadium; Attendance: 13,034; Referee: Geoff Gamble

June 9, 2010	NSC Minnesota Stars	1 – 0	Montreal Impact	Blaine, Minnesota, USA
	Brian Cvilikas (yellow card) 57'; Kyle Altman (yellow card) 86'; Melvin Tarley 87'	(report)	Nevio Pizzolitto (yellow card) 37'; Philippe Billy (yellow card) 55'; Stephen deRoux (yellow card) 88'	Stadium: National Sports Center; Attendance: 746; Referee: Ben Trevino

June 12, 2010	FC Tampa Bay Rowdies	1 – 2	Montreal Impact	Tampa, Florida, USA
	Takuya Yamada (yellow card) 63'; Aaron King 70'	(report)	David Testo (yellow card) 42'; Peter Byers 49'; Roberto Brown 66'; Nevio Pizzolitto (yellow card) 70'; Peter Byers (yellow card) 86'; Adam Braz (yellow card) 87'	Stadium: George M. Steinbrenner Field; Attendance: 4,787; Referee: Martin Bel

June 20, 2010	Montreal Impact	1 – 1	Rochester Rhinos	Montreal
	Eduardo Sebrango 79'	(report)	Aaron Pitchkolan 4'; T. J. Gore (yellow card) 84'; Aaron Pitchkolan (yellow card) 90'	Stadium: Saputo Stadium; Attendance: 11,920; Referee: John Oliva

June 26, 2010	Carolina RailHawks FC	2 – 2	Montreal Impact	Cary, North Carolina, USA
	Mark Schulte (yellow card) 31'; Sallieu Bundu 61'; Floyd Franks 73'; Josh Gardner (yellow card) 75'; Daniel Paladini (yellow card) 89'	(report)	Patrick Leduc (yellow card) 71'; Simon Gatti 75'; Tony Donatelli 90'	Stadium: WakeMed Soccer Park; Attendance: 2,157; Referee: Jamey Walter

June 30, 2010	Montreal Impact	1 – 2	Vancouver Whitecaps	Montreal
	Tony Donatelli 3'	(report)	Zourab Tsiskaridze (yellow card) 63'; Greg Janicki 66'; Justin Moose (yellow card) 90'; Luca Bellisomo 90'	Stadium: Saputo Stadium; Attendance: 11,949; Referee: David Gantar

July 3, 2010	Rochester Rhinos	2 – 1	Montreal Impact	Rochester, New York, USA
	Troy Roberts 45'; Rich Costanzo 85'; Rich Costanzo (yellow card) 85'; Kenold Versailles (yellow card) 90'	(report)	Reda Agourram 90'	Stadium: Marina Auto Stadium; Attendance: 6,505; Referee: M. Renderos

July 10, 2010	AC St. Louis	3 – 0	Montreal Impact	Fenton, Missouri, USA
	Troy Cole (yellow card) 52'; Chris Salvaggione 57'; Luke Kreamalmeyer 62'; Jeff Cosgriff 78'	(report)	Filipe Pastel (yellow card) 38'; David Testo (yellow card) 58' (yellow-red card) 72'	Stadium: Anheuser-Busch Soccer Park; Attendance: 2,307

July 14, 2010	Montreal Impact	1 – 0	Carolina RailHawks FC	Montreal
	Simon Gatti (yellow card) 10'; Peter Byers 73'	(report)	Josh Gardner (yellow card) 5'; Amir Lowery (yellow card) 67'; Daniel Paladini (yellow card) 88' (yellow-red card) 90'	Stadium: Saputo Stadium; Attendance: 11,790; Referee: Mauricio Navarro

July 18, 2010	Montreal Impact	1 – 2	Crystal Palace Baltimore	Montreal
	Leonardo Di Lorenzo 3'; Reda Agourram (yellow card) 59'; Philippe Billy (yellow card) 77'	(report)	Dan Lader (yellow card) 9'; Gary Brooks (yellow card) 42'; Gary Brooks 45'; Andrew Marshall (yellow card) 65'; Evan Bush (yellow card) 90'	Stadium: Saputo Stadium; Attendance: 13,034; Referee: David Barrie

July 21, 2010	Montreal Impact	3 – 0	AC St. Louis	Montreal
	Nevio Pizzolitto (yellow card) 9'; Reda Agourram 24'; Tony Donatelli 29'; Tony Donatelli (yellow card) 35'; Filipe Pastel (red card) 67'; Antonio Ribeiro 82'	(report)	Gauchinho (red card) 67'; Jack Traynor (yellow card) 71'	Stadium: Saputo Stadium; Attendance: 10,864; Referee: Geoff Gamble

July 28, 2010	Montreal Impact	0 – 1	Vancouver Whitecaps	Montreal
	Antonio Ribeiro (yellow card) 21'; Simon Gatti (yellow card) 23'	(report)	Greg Janicki 88'	Stadium: Saputo Stadium; Attendance: 12,355; Referee: Justin Tasev

July 31, 2010	Crystal Palace Baltimore	1 – 1	Montreal Impact	Boyds, Maryland, USA
	Evan Bush (yellow card) 22'; Gary Brooks 77'; Tsuyoshi Yoshitake (yellow card) 81'	(report)	Wesley Charles (yellow card) 19'; Simon Gatti (yellow card) 42' (yellow-red card) 56'; Tony Donatelli 63'	Stadium: Maryland SoccerPlex; Attendance: 723; Referee: Ayodeji Obisesan

August 7, 2010	Carolina RailHawks FC	2 – 0	Montreal Impact	Cary, North Carolina, USA
	Josh Gardner 45'; Mark Schulte (yellow card) 63'; Cory Elenio 83'; Andriy Budnyy (red card) 90'	(report)	Patrick Leduc (yellow card) 14'; Nevio Pizzolitto (yellow card) 85'; Filipe Pastel (yellow card) 89'; Adam Braz (yellow card) 90'; Matt Jordan (yellow card) 90'	Stadium: WakeMed Soccer Park; Attendance: 2,184; Referee: Mark DeClouet

August 11, 2010	Montreal Impact	0 – 0	Crystal Palace Baltimore	Montreal
		(report)	Korey Veeder (yellow card) 47'; Tsuyoshi Yoshitake (yellow card) 54'; Andrew Marshall (yellow card) 60' (yellow-red card) 88'; Zack Flores (yellow card) 90'	Stadium: Saputo Stadium; Attendance: 12,443; Referee: John Oliva

August 14, 2010	Rochester Rhinos	2 – 1	Montreal Impact	Rochester, New York, USA
	Frank Sanfilippo 36'; Isaac Kissi 84'	(report)	Hicham Aaboubou (yellow card) 43'; Eduardo Sebrango 45'; Richard Pelletier (yellow card) 71'	Stadium: Marina Auto Stadium; Attendance: 7,717; Referee: John McCloskey

August 21, 2010	Crystal Palace Baltimore	0–5	Montreal Impact	Towson, Maryland, USA
	Santiago Fusilier (yellow card) 35'; Tsuyoshi Yoshitake (yellow card) 41'	(report)	Ali Gerba 15'; Eduardo Sebrango 25'; Ali Gerba 38'; Ali Gerba 44'; Antonio Ribeiro 53'; Richard Pelletier (yellow card) 84'	Stadium: Paul Russo Stadium; Attendance: 948; Referee: Kian Attai

August 27, 2010	Montreal Impact	2–0	Rochester Rhinos	Montreal
	Ali Gerba 1'; Ali Gerba 81'; Ali Gerba (yellow card) 81'	(report)	Tyler Bellamy (yellow card) 69'; Jonathan Greenfield (yellow card) 90'	Stadium: Saputo Stadium; Attendance: 13,034; Referee: Geoff Gamble

September 8, 2010	Puerto Rico Islanders	1–2	Montreal Impact	Bayamón, Puerto Rico
	Noah Delgado 50'; Marco Vélez (yellow card) 62'; Shaka Bangura (yellow card) 78'	(report)	Ali Gerba 60'; Ali Gerba 75'; David Testo (yellow card) 89'; Anthony Le Gall (yellow card) 90'	Stadium: Juan Ramón Loubriel Stadium; Attendance: 1,474; Referee: Jesus Lebron

September 11, 2010	Miami FC	2–1	Montreal Impact	Fort Lauderdale, Florida, USA
	Lennon Celestino (yellow card) 31'; Christian Gomez 44'; Abe Thompson 83'	(report)	David Testo (yellow card) 18'; Nevio Pizzolitto (yellow card) 28'; Eduardo Sebrango 54'	Stadium: Lockhart Stadium; Attendance: 1,106; Referee: Guido Gonzalez

September 19, 2010	Montreal Impact	3–0	FC Tampa Bay Rowdies	Montreal
	Tony Donatelli 10'; Ali Gerba (yellow card) 33'; Ali Gerba 45'; Ali Gerba 82'	(report)	Josh Lambo (yellow card) 8'; Maykel Galindo (yellow card) 28'; Jonny Steele (yellow card) 84'	Stadium: Saputo Stadium; Attendance: 13,034; Referee: Geoff Gamble

September 24, 2010	Vancouver Whitecaps	0–1	Montreal Impact	Burnaby, British Columbia, Canada
	Blake Wagner (yellow card) 48'; Terry Dunfield (yellow card) 67'; Gershon Koffie (red card) 85'; Randy Edwini-Bonsu (yellow card) 90'	(report)	Eduardo Sebrango 29'; Antonio Ribeiro (yellow card) 52'; Eduardo Sebrango (yellow card) 64'; David Testo (yellow card) 67'; Tony Donatelli (yellow card) 74'	Stadium: Swangard Stadium; Attendance: 5,288; Referee: Justin Tasev

October 3, 2010	Montreal Impact	2–0	Austin Aztex FC	Montreal
	Anthony Le Gall 26'; Anthony Le Gall (yellow card) 27'; Ali Gerba (yellow card) 42'; Rocco Placentino 87'; Pierre-Rudolph Mayard (yellow card) 90'	(report)	Randi Patterson (red card) 29'	Stadium: Saputo Stadium; Attendance: 12,608; Referee: John Oliva

=== USSF Division II Playoffs ===
==== Quarterfinals ====
October 6, 2010	Montreal Impact	2–0	Austin Aztex FC	Montreal
	David Testo (yellow card) 18'; Adam Braz (yellow card) 38'; Ali Gerba 39'; Antonio Ribeiro (yellow card) 69'; Ali Gerba 76'; Rocco Placentino (yellow card) 80'; Philippe Billy (yellow card) 90'	(report)	Eddie Johnson (yellow card) 37'	Stadium: Saputo Stadium; Attendance: 7,962; Referee: Justin Tasev

October 9, 2010	Austin Aztex FC	2–3	Montreal Impact	Austin, Texas, USA
	Jay Needham (yellow card) 27'; Maxwell Griffin 43'; Eddie Johnson 57'; Tsuyoshi Yoshitake (yellow card) 80'; Ian Fuller (yellow card) 86'	(report)	Ali Gerba 4'; Ali Gerba 49'; Srdjan Djekanović (yellow card) 72'; Eduardo Sebrango (yellow card) 86'; Leonardo Di Lorenzo (yellow card) 86'; Eduardo Sebrango 89'	Stadium: House Park; Attendance: 2,870; Referee: Allen Chapman

==== Semifinals ====
October 14, 2010	Montreal Impact	1–0	Carolina RailHawks FC	Montreal
	Antonio Ribeiro (yellow card) 23'; Leonardo Di Lorenzo 35'; Philippe Billy (yellow card) 56'	(report)	Jun Marques Davidson (yellow card) 13'; Amir Lowery (yellow card) 44'; Daniel Paladini (yellow card) 53'; Brad Rusin (yellow card) 84'	Stadium: Saputo Stadium; Attendance: 7,502; Referee: Geoff Gamble

October 17, 2010	Carolina RailHawks FC	2–0	Montreal Impact	Cary, North Carolina, USA
	Brad Rusin 72'; Etienne Barbara (yellow card) 75'; Brad Rusin (yellow card) 86'; Tommy Heinemann 89'	(report)	Patrick Leduc (yellow card) 57'; Pierre-Rudolph Mayard (yellow card) 72'; Marco Terminesi (yellow card) 90'; Hicham Aaboubou (yellow card) 90'	Stadium: WakeMed Soccer Park; Attendance: 2,869; Referee: Jose Carlos Rivero

=== Canadian Championship ===
April 28, 2010	Toronto FC	2 – 0	Montreal Impact	Toronto, Ontario, Canada
	De Rosario 11'; Cronin (yellow card) 23'; De Guzman (yellow card) 34'; Gargan (yellow card) 56'; Barrett 61'; Frei (yellow card) 80'	(report)	Pizzolitto (yellow card) 24'; Brown (red card) 35'; Braz (yellow card) 45'	Stadium: BMO Field; Attendance: 21,346; Referee: Paul Ward

May 5, 2010	Vancouver Whitecaps	1 – 1	Montreal Impact	Burnaby, British Columbia, Canada
	Bellisomo (yellow card) 75'; Haber 80'	(report)	Braz (yellow card) 21' (yellow-red card) 80'; Byers 32'; Aaboubou (yellow card) 52'; Agourram (red card) 90'	Stadium: Swangard Stadium; Attendance: 4,325; Referee: Geoff Gamble

May 12, 2010	Montreal Impact	0 – 1	Toronto FC	Montreal
		(report)	Usanov (yellow card) 15'; De Rosario 73'	Stadium: Saputo Stadium; Attendance: 10,737; Referee: Dave Gantar

May 26, 2010	Montreal Impact	1 – 1	Vancouver Whitecaps	Montreal
	Billy 62', (yellow card) 89'; Pesoli (yellow card) 68'; Djekanović (yellow card) 73'	(report)	Toure 50'	Stadium: Saputo Stadium; Attendance: 10,959; Referee: Silviu Petrescu

=== Regular Season Exhibition Games ===
April 17, 2010	Antigua Barracuda FC	0 – 1	Montreal Impact	North Sound, Antigua and Barbuda
		(report)	Agourram 26'	Stadium: Sir Vivian Richards Stadium

May 23, 2010	Montreal Impact	1 – 1	Fiorentina	Montreal
	Agourram 8'	(report)	Donadel (yellow card) 29'; Jovetić 63'; Natali (yellow card) 82'	Stadium: Saputo Stadium; Attendance: 8.094; Referee: Silviu Petrescu

June 2, 2010	Montreal Impact	1 – 4	Milan	Montreal
	Testo 17'	(report)	Pato 12'; Inzaghi 25'; Blasi (yellow card) 40'; Seedorf 58'; Ronaldinho 81'	Stadium: Olympic Stadium; Attendance: 47,861; Referee: Mauricio Navarro

June 16, 2010	FC Edmonton	3 – 0	Montreal Impact	Edmonton, Alberta, Canada
		(report)		Stadium: Foote Field; Attendance: 2,106

== 2010 season stats ==
=== Season stats ===
				Total				USSF		Canadian Championship		Playoffs		
N	Pos.	Name	Nat.	GS	App	Gls	Min	App	Gls	App	Gls	App	Gls	Notes
1	GK	Matt Jordan	(United States)	23	23	-23	1440	16	-15	3	-4	4	-4	(−) means goals conceded
2	DF	Hicham Aâboubou	(Morocco)	31	31		2123	24		3		4		
3	DF	Adam Braz	(Canada)	21	29		1227	22		3		4		
5	DF	Nevio Pizzolitto	(Canada)	30	31	1	2067	24	1	3		4		
6	MF	Tyler Hemming	(Canada)	5	6		279	5		1				No longer with the team
6	DF	Richard Pelletier	(France)	2	8		267	8						
7	MF	David Testo	(United States)	27	29		1861	24		3		2		
8	MF	Filipe Pastel	(Portugal)	16	23	1	1084	18	1	4		1		
9	MF	Rocco Placentino	(Canada)	13	31	3	1030	24	3	4		3		
10	FW	Ali Gerba	(Canada)	16	17	13	997	13	9			4	4	
10	FW	Roberto Brown	(Panama)	9	13	1	760	12	1	1				No longer with the team
11	MF	Leonardo Di Lorenzo	(Argentina)	31	34	2	2001	26	1	4		4	1	
12	FW	Eduardo Sebrango	(Cuba)	19	32	6	1155	25	5	3		4	1	
14	MF	Tony Donatelli	(United States)	35	38	7	2359	30	7	4		4		
15	MF	Patrick Leduc	(Canada)	9	23		799	19		2		2		
16	DF	Wesley Charles	(Saint Vincent and the Grenadines)	6	9		546	8				1		
16	DF	Stefano Pesoli	(Italy)	2	2		90	1		1				No longer with the team
17	FW	Anthony Le Gall	(France)	4	11	1	274	7	1			4		
18	FW	Marco Terminesi	(Canada)	2	9		172	7				2		
19	FW	Reda Agourram	(Canada)	8	27	2	825	22	2	1		4		
21	MF	Philippe Billy	(France)	33	38	1	2423	30		4	1	4		
22	GK	Srdjan Djekanović	(Canada)	15	17	-16	1260	14	-15	1	-1	2		(−) means goals conceded
23	MF	Stephen deRoux	(Jamaica)	17	20		1263	16		4				
24	MF	Simon Gatti	(Canada)	12	19	1	969	18	1	1				
26	MF	António Ribeiro	(Canada)	14	15	2	958	12	2			3		
26	DF	Cédric Joqueviel	(France)	5	6		360	4		2				No longer with the team
28	FW	Peter Byers	(Antigua and Barbuda)	14	21	3	910	17	2	4	1			No longer with the team
30	MF	Pierre-Rudolph Mayard	(Canada)		6		107	5				1		
32	MF	Kevin Cossette	(Canada)		3		24	3						

Last updated: September 10
Source: Competitive matches
Ordered by number
0 shown as blank

== Regular season stats ==
=== Points leaders ===
Name	Nationality	Position	Goals	Assists	Points
Ali Gerba	(Canada)	FW	9	1	19
Tony Donatelli	(United States)	MF	7	3	17
Eduardo Sebrango	(Cuba)	FW	5	2	12
Leonardo Di Lorenzo	(Argentina)	MF	1	7	9
Rocco Placentino	(Canada)	MF	3	2	8
António Ribeiro	(Canada)	MF	2	2	6
Peter Byers	(Antigua and Barbuda)	FW	2	0	4
Reda Agourram	(Canada)	FW	2	0	4
Roberto Brown	(Panama)	FW	1	1	3
Filipe Pastel	(Portugal)	MF	1	1	3
Simon Gatti	(Canada)	MF	1	1	3
Nevio Pizzolitto	(Canada)	DF	1	0	2
Anthony Le Gall	(France)	MF	1	0	2
Philippe Billy	(France)	MF	0	2	2
Stephen deRoux	(Jamaica)	MF	0	1	1
David Testo	(United States)	MF	0	1	1
Richard Pelletier	(France)	DF	0	1	1
Adam Braz	(Canada)	DF	0	1	1
Patrick Leduc	(Canada)	DF	0	1	1

=== Disciplinary records ===
N	Pos.	Nat.	Name	Yellow card	Second yellow card	Red card	Notes
1	GK	(United States)	Matt Jordan	1			
2	DF	(Morocco)	Hicham Aâboubou	3			
3	DF	(Canada)	Adam Braz	5			
5	DF	(Canada)	Nevio Pizzolitto	6			
6	DF	(France)	Richard Pelletier	2			
7	MF	(United States)	David Testo	6	1		
8	MF	(Portugal)	Filipe Pastel	6		1	
9	MF	(Canada)	Rocco Placentino	3			
10	FW	(Canada)	Ali Gerba	3			
12	FW	(Cuba)	Eduardo Sebrango	2			
14	MF	(United States)	Tony Donatelli	3			
15	MF	(Canada)	Patrick Leduc	2			
16	DF	(Saint Vincent and the Grenadines)	Wesley Charles	1			
17	FW	(France)	Anthony Le Gall	2			
19	FW	(Canada)	Reda Agourram	1			
21	MF	(France)	Philippe Billy	2			
23	DF	(Jamaica)	Stephen deRoux	2			
24	DF	(Canada)	Simon Gatti	3	1		
26	MF	(Canada)	António Ribeiro	2			
28	FW	(Antigua and Barbuda)	Peter Byers	2			
30	MF	(Canada)	Pierre-Rudolph Mayard	1			

Last updated: June 13
Source: Competitive matches
Only competitive matches
(yellow card) = Number of bookings; (second yellow card) = Number of sending offs after a second yellow card; (red card) = Number of sending offs by a direct red card.

^{1}Player is no longer with team

== Playoff stats ==
=== Points leaders ===
Name	Nationality	Position	Goals	Assists	Points
Ali Gerba	(Canada)	FW	4	0	8
Leonardo Di Lorenzo	(Argentina)	MF	1	1	3
Eduardo Sebrango	(Cuba)	FW	1	0	2
Philippe Billy	(France)	MF	0	2	2
Rocco Placentino	(Canada)	MF	0	1	1

=== Disciplinary records ===
N	Pos.	Nat.	Name	Yellow card	Second yellow card	Red card	Notes
2	DF	(Morocco)	Hicham Aâboubou	1			
3	DF	(Canada)	Adam Braz	1			
7	MF	(United States)	David Testo	1			
9	MF	(Canada)	Rocco Placentino	1			
11	MF	(Argentina)	Leonardo Di Lorenzo	1			
12	FW	(Cuba)	Eduardo Sebrango	1			
15	MF	(Canada)	Patrick Leduc	1			
18	FW	(Canada)	Marco Terminesi	1			
21	MF	(France)	Philippe Billy	2			
22	GK	(Canada)	Srdjan Djekanović	1			
26	MF	(Canada)	António Ribeiro	2			
30	MF	(Canada)	Pierre-Rudolph Mayard	1			

Last updated: October 18
Source: Competitive matches
Only competitive matches
(yellow card) = Number of bookings; (second yellow card) = Number of sending offs after a second yellow card; (red card) = Number of sending offs by a direct red card.

^{1}Player is no longer with team
