= Sergio Flores =

Sergio Flores may refer to:

- Sergio Flores (born 1985), American soccer forward
- Sergio Flores (born 1995), Mexican football defensive midfielder
