= Anastasia Bucsis =

Canadian speed skater (born 1989)

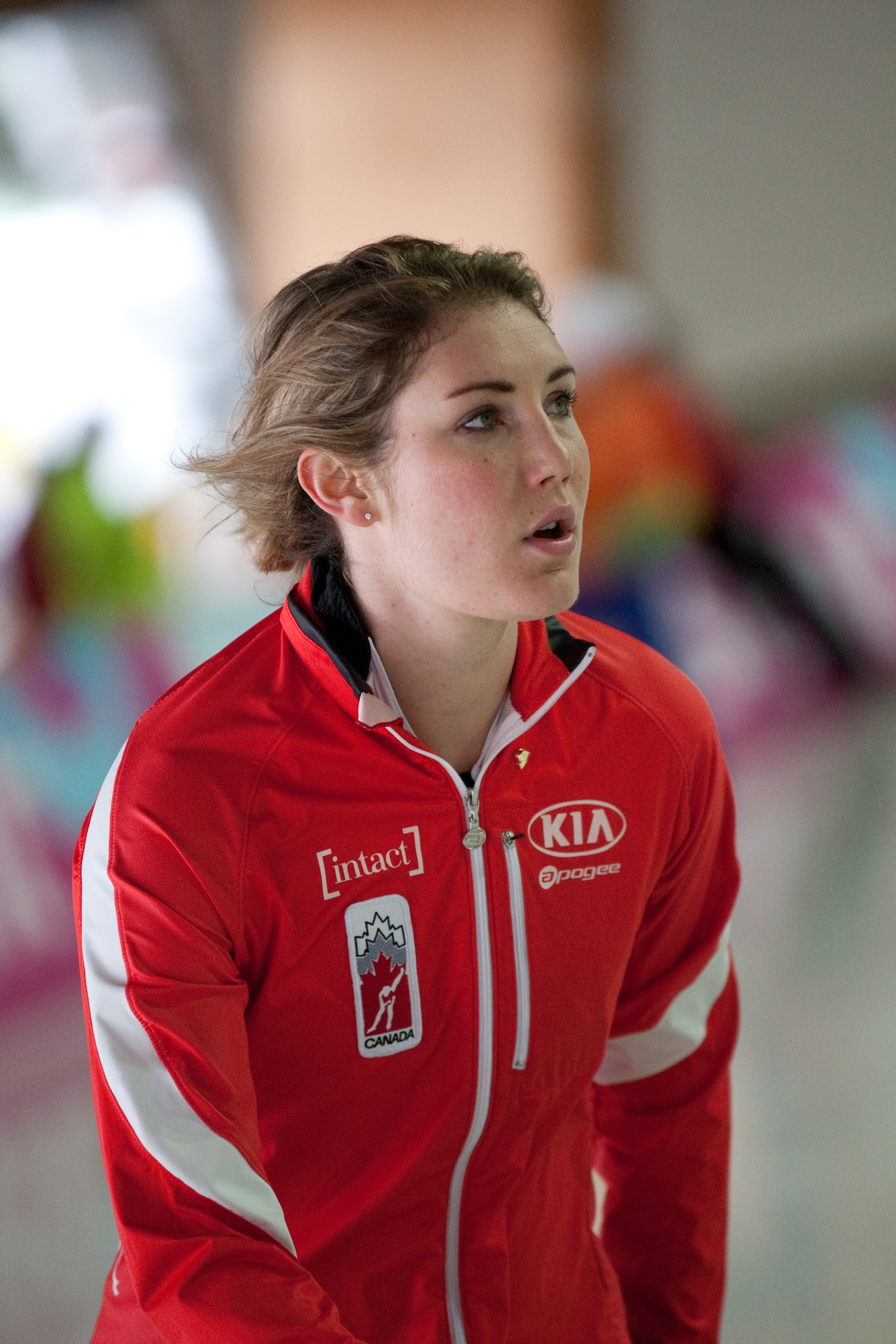

Personal information
- Born: 30 April 1989 (age 37) Calgary, Alberta, Canada
- Spouse: Diana Matheson (m. 2023)

Sport
- Country: Canada
- Sport: Speed skating
- Club: Calgary Speed Skating

Achievements and titles
- Olympic finals: 2010, 2014

Anastasia Bucsis (born 30 April 1989) is a Canadian former long track speed skater and current sports broadcaster. She represented Canada at the 2010 Winter Olympics in Vancouver and the 2014 Winter Olympics in Sochi, competing in the women’s 500-metre event. Bucsis came out publicly prior to the 2014 Sochi Games in opposition to Russian anti-LGBTQ laws. Following her athletic career, Bucsis transitioned into broadcasting and media, becoming a host and analyst with CBC Sports. Bucsis served as a prime-time co-host for CBC’s Olympic coverage, and has been recognized for her leadership and advocacy in Canadian sport. Bucsis lives in Toronto, and is a passionate advocate for mental health issues, eradicating homophobia in sport, and telling the stories of athletes.

== Athletic career ==
Bucsis began speed skating at age four, won silver at the 2007 Canada Winter Games in 500 metre speed skating, and went on to represent Canada in two Olympic Winter Games, six World Championships, and 46 World Cup starts. During her international athletic career, Bucsis attended the University of Calgary, where she studied Communications and Culture and represented Canada in speed skating at the 2009 Winter Universiade. She qualified for her first Olympics at the age of 20, competing in the Olympic Winter Games in Vancouver in 2010. Bucsis competed at her second Olympic Winter Games in Sochi in 2014.

On 10 April 2017, Bucsis retired from speed skating after a serious knee injury.

== Professional career ==
Following her athletic career, Bucsis transitioned to become a sportscaster for CBC Sports. She has hosted digital shows for CBC during the Tokyo 2020 Olympics as well as the Beijing 2022 Winter Olympics. She created and hosted the CBC podcast Player’s Own Voice, a series of conversations with high-performance athletes that ran from 2018 to 2024 with over 100 episodes. Bucsis's hosting work for the CBC's coverage of the 2024 Paris Summer Olympics in France earned her a Canadian Screen Awards nomination as Best Sports Host (2025). Bucsis was then named prime-time co-host for CBC’s coverage of the 2026 Winter Olympics in Milan–Cortina. Bucsis has also worked as CBC's Long Track speed skating analyst since 2018.

== Personal life ==
Bucsis was born and raised in Calgary, Alberta, Canada by parents Ross and Anita Bucsis. In 2013 at Calgary Pride, she came out publicly in opposition to Russian anti-LGBTQ laws prior to the Sochi Olympics. She was the only athlete from North America to do so, and garnered media attention. She has done extensive work within the LGBTQ community to combat homophobia in sport. Bucsis is also an advocate for mental health, after having struggled with anxiety and depression. In 2014, she appeared in the documentary film To Russia with Love.

In 2019, Bucsis appeared in Standing on the Line, a documentary film about homophobia in sports by Paul-Émile d'Entremont.

Bucsis married former women's soccer player Diana Matheson in August 2023.

== Awards and honours ==
- In 2025, Bucsis was awarded the Bruce Kidd Leadership Award at the 48th Canadian Sport Awards, recognizing her leadership, advocacy for inclusion, and contributions to sport following her competitive career.
- Bucsis received a nomination for Best Sports Host at the 2025 Canadian Screen Awards for her broadcast work on CBC’s coverage of the 2024 Paris Summer Olympics.
- In 2025, she received the King Charles III Coronation Medal after being recognized by the Canada Games Council for her impact on Canadian sport and the Canada Games movement.
