= David Testo =

American soccer player

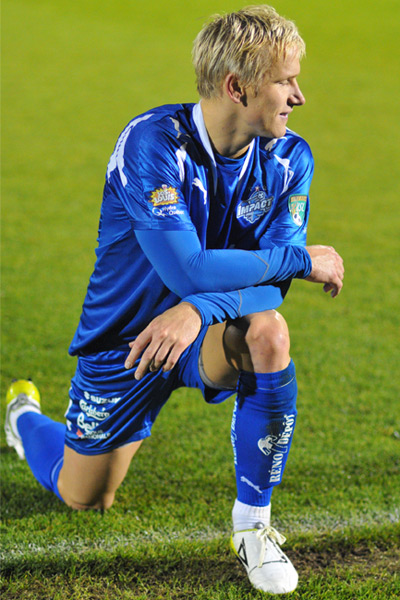
- Testo with the Montreal Impact in 2009

Personal information
- Full name: David Testo
- Date of birth: August 7, 1981 (age 45)
- Place of birth: Winston-Salem, North Carolina, U.S.
- Height: 5 ft 11 in (1.80 m)
- Position: Midfielder

Youth career
- 1999–2000: South Carolina Gamecocks
- 2001–2002: North Carolina Tar Heels

Senior career*
Years	Team	Apps	(Gls)
2003	Richmond Kickers	28	(6)
2004–2005	Columbus Crew	33	(1)
2006–2007	Vancouver Whitecaps	34	(6)
2007–2011	Montreal Impact	83	(3)
Total		178	(16)
- * Club domestic league appearances and goals as of June 4, 2011

David Testo (born August 7, 1981) is an American retired soccer player who, after his playing career ended in 2011, became the first male American professional player of that sport to come out as gay. Testo played professionally from 2003 to 2011, including two years in with the Columbus Crew from 2004 to 2005. He began his career with the Richmond Kickers, and also played for the Vancouver Whitecaps and Montreal Impact before he was released by the Impact in 2011. He played collegiately for South Carolina and North Carolina.

== Career ==
=== College ===
After a standout prep career at Asheville, North Carolina's TC Roberson High School, where he was named the North Carolina state player of the year in 1998, Testo played his first and second years of college soccer at the University of South Carolina, where he registered six goals and 11 assists in 33 games. After his sophomore season, Testo moved to the University of North Carolina at Chapel Hill, where he emerged as a major force, helping lead the Tar Heels to an NCAA Championship his junior season. Testo was named to the All-ACC second team both his seasons at UNC, after scoring 11 goals and six assists as a junior, and seven goals and nine assists as a senior.

=== Professional ===
Upon graduating from college, Testo went undrafted in the 2003 MLS SuperDraft despite his experience with the youth U.S. national teams. Testo signed with the Richmond Kickers, with whom he made an immediate impact, playing in 28 games and scoring six goals. For his performance, Testo was named the A-League's 2003 Rookie of the Year.

After his performance in the A-League, he joined the Columbus Crew of Major League Soccer. Due to many injuries, Testo was sidelined; however, he received more action in 2005. After ending that season with a goal and multiple assists, Testo was released. He then signed with the Vancouver Whitecaps.

He was named Newcomer of the Year and was second in team scoring (seven goals, seven assists) behind Joey Gjertsen (13 goals, seven assists) while playing both as a striker and in his preferred midfield positions equally well. Testo assisted on both Whitecaps goals scored in the final five minutes of OT in the USL semifinal match on September 24 when the Caps defeated Montreal 2–0 to earn a spot in the USL championship game against Rochester on September 30.

The Whitecaps became the first team in USL history to win a championship game on the road as they withstood a fifteen-minute all-out attack by the Rhinos to start the game and then dominated their hosts to win 3–0 before 10,000 partisan and rain-soaked fans. The 'Caps scored 11 goals and only surrendered one (on a free kick) in five playoff games and one OT period. Vancouver's second goal in this game was a result of Testo's pass to Gjertsen who one-timed it to a charging Tony Donatelli; Tony held on for an interminable two seconds before powering it home to the back of the net. Testo earned an assist on the final goal with a pass to Matondo who scored easily to end all doubt. Testo started celebrating by running into the stands to hug his mother who had come up from North Carolina to join a small but vocal contingent of Whitecaps supporters.

Testo was traded to the Montreal Impact on July 26, 2007, along with Joey Gjertsen for Alen Marcina, and Zé Roberto. He recorded his first goal for Montreal on August 1, 2007, against Carolina Railhawks. During the 2008 USL season Testo played in 20 matches for the Impact, and scored one goal against Miami FC on July 18, 2008. In the 2008 Canadian Championship he appeared in all four matches for the Impact, and scored a goal in 2–0 victory over the Vancouver Whitecaps. He helped the Impact qualify for the first time for the CONCACAF Champions League by winning the Canadian Championship. During the club's playoff run Testo scored in the quarterfinal match against Portland Timbers.

During the 2009 USL season Testo contributed by helping the Impact clinch a playoff spot under new head coach Marc Dos Santos. He recorded his first playoff goal in the quarterfinal match against Charleston Battery. The match resulted in 2–1 victory for the Impact, and allowing the Impact to advance to the finals by winning their second match on aggregate. Montreal would advance on to the finals where their opponents would end up being the Vancouver Whitecaps, thus marking the first time in USL history where the final match would consist of two Canadian clubs. In the final Testo helped the Impact win the series 6–3 on aggregate. The victory gave the Impact their third USL Championship and also the victory marked Testo's second USL Championship. On October 6, 2009, Testo received the Giuseppe-Saputo Trophy, presented to the Impact's Most Valuable Player during the team's 2009 awards banquet. On November 30, 2009, Testo signed a new two-year deal with the club.

Testo was released by Montreal on October 12, 2011.

In 2019, he appeared in Standing on the Line, a documentary film about homophobia in sports by Paul-Émile d'Entremont.

== Personal life ==
In an interview on French Canadian public broadcaster Radio Canada that was aired on November 10, 2011, Testo announced he was gay and that his family, friends, teammates, and team management were aware of his sexuality. Testo became the first American professional soccer player to come out as gay.

Testo is a member of the advisory board for You Can Play, a campaign dedicated to fighting homophobia in sports.

== Career statistics ==
Appearances and goals by club, season and competition
Club	Season	League			Playoffs		Cup		CONCACAF		Total	
Club	Season	Division	Apps	Goals	Apps	Goals	Apps	Goals	Apps	Goals	Apps	Goals
Richmond Kickers	2003	USL-1	28	6	–		–		–		28	6
Columbus Crew	2004	MLS	16	0	–		–		–		16	0
Columbus Crew	2005	MLS	17	1	–		–		–		17	1
Columbus Crew	2006	MLS	0	0	–		–		–		0	0
Columbus Crew	Total		33	1	0	0	0	0	0	0	33	1
Vancouver Whitecaps	2006	USL-1	21	6	5	1	–		–		26	7
Vancouver Whitecaps	2007	USL-1	16	1	–		–		–		16	1
Vancouver Whitecaps	Total		37	7	5	1	0	0	0	0	42	8
Montreal Impact	2007	USL-1	7	1	2	0	–		–		9	1
Montreal Impact	2008	USL-1	20	1	2	1	4	1	7	0	33	3
Montreal Impact	2009	USL-1	26	1	6	2	2	0	–		34	3
Montreal Impact	2010	USSF D2	24	0	2	0	3	0	–		29	0
Montreal Impact	2011	NASL	20	0	–		2	0	–		22	0
Montreal Impact	Total		97	3	12	3	11	1	7	0	127	7
Career total			195	17	17	4	11	1	7	0	230	22

== Honors ==
Vancouver Whitecaps

- USL First Division Championship: 2006

Montreal Impact

- USL First Division Championship: 2009
- Voyageurs Cup: 2007, 2008
