= Richard Pelletier =

French footballer (born 1988)

Personal information
- Full name: Richard Pelletier
- Date of birth: 30 November 1988 (age 37)
- Place of birth: Niort, France
- Height: 6 ft 0 in (1.83 m)
- Position: Defender

Team information
- Current team: Stade Plabennecois
- Number: 6

Youth career
- 2005: Chamois Niortais
- 2006: Angers SCO

Senior career*
Years	Team	Apps	(Gls)
2007–2010	Brest	0	(0)
2010	→ La Vitréenne (loan)	1	(0)
2010–2011	Montreal Impact	9	(0)
2011–2013	Stade Plabennec Football	11	(4)
2013–	Angoulême CFC		
- * Club domestic league appearances and goals as of 4 June 2011

Richard Pelletier (born 30 November 1988) is a French footballer who currently plays for Angoulême CFC in the Championnat de France amateur 2.

== Career ==
=== Europe ===
Pelletier was a member of the youth setup at his hometown team, Chamois Niortais, and later with Angers SCO, before signing his first professional contract in 2007.

Pelletier spent the first 3 years of his career playing for the Brest in Ligue 2, leaving in 2010 before he made a first team appearance for the club. He spent a short period on loan with La Vitréenne during the spring of 2010, before moving to Canada.

=== North America ===
On 9 August 2010 Pelletier signed a 2-year deal with the Montreal Impact of USSF Division 2, along with his compatriot Anthony Le Gall. He made his debut for Impact on 11 August 2010 against Crystal Palace Baltimore.

=== CFA ===
On 20 September 2011 returned to France and signed with Championnat de France amateur club Stade Plabennecois.

=== CFA 2 ===
In June 2013, he signed for Angoulême CFC in Championnat de France amateur 2.

== Career stats ==
Team	Season	League	Domestic League			Domestic Playoffs			Domestic Cup^{1}			Concacaf Competition^{2}			Total		
Team	Season	League	Apps	Goals	Assists	Apps	Goals	Assists	Apps	Goals	Assists	Apps	Goals	Assists	Apps	Goals	Assists
Montreal Impact	2010	USSF D2	8	0	1	-	-	-	-	-	-	-	-	-	8	0	1
Montreal Impact	2011	NASL	1	0	0	-	-	-	-	-	-	-	-	-	1	0	0
		Total USSF D2	9	0	1	-	-	-	-	-	-	-	-	-	9	0	1
