= Anthony Le Gall =

French footballer (born 1985)

Personal information
- Full name: Anthony Le Gall
- Date of birth: March 7, 1985 (age 41)
- Place of birth: Morlaix, France
- Height: 1.75 m (5 ft 9 in)
- Position: Midfielder

Team information
- Current team: Angoulême CFC
- Number: 9

Youth career
- 2002–2003: AC Le Havre
- 2003–2007: Brest

Senior career*
Years	Team	Apps	(Gls)
2007–2010	Brest	24	(2)
2010–2011	Montreal Impact	28	(2)
2012	US Concarneau		
2013–	Angoulême CFC		

International career
2010	Brittany	2	(0)
- * Club domestic league appearances and goals as of June 8, 2011

Anthony Le Gall (born March 7, 1985) is a French footballer currently playing for Angoulême CFC in Division Honneur (6th division).

== Career ==
=== Europe ===
Le Gall was a member of the youth setup at AC Le Havre, and later with Brest, before signing his first professional contract with Brest in 2007. He made 24 appearances, and scored 2 goals, for Brest in his three years with the club, before moving to Canada.

=== Canada ===
In the summer of 2010 Le Gall signed with the Montreal Impact of USSF Division 2 Professional League, along with his compatriot Richard Pelletier. He made his debut for Impact on August 21, 2010, in a 5–0 win over Crystal Palace Baltimore, and scored his first goal for his new team on October 3, in a 2–0 win over the Austin Aztex on the last day of the 2010 USSFD2 regular season.

== Career stats ==
Team	Season	League	Domestic League			Domestic Playoffs			Domestic Cup^{1}			Concacaf Competition^{2}			Total		
Team	Season	League	Apps	Goals	Assists	Apps	Goals	Assists	Apps	Goals	Assists	Apps	Goals	Assists	Apps	Goals	Assists
Montreal Impact	2010	USSF D2	7	1	0	4	0	0	-	-	-	-	-	-	11	1	0
Montreal Impact	2011	NASL	15	1	1	-	-	-	2	0	0	-	-	-	17	1	1
		Total NASL	22	2	1	4	0	0	2	0	0	-	-	-	28	2	1
