= Jim Cherneski =

American soccer player

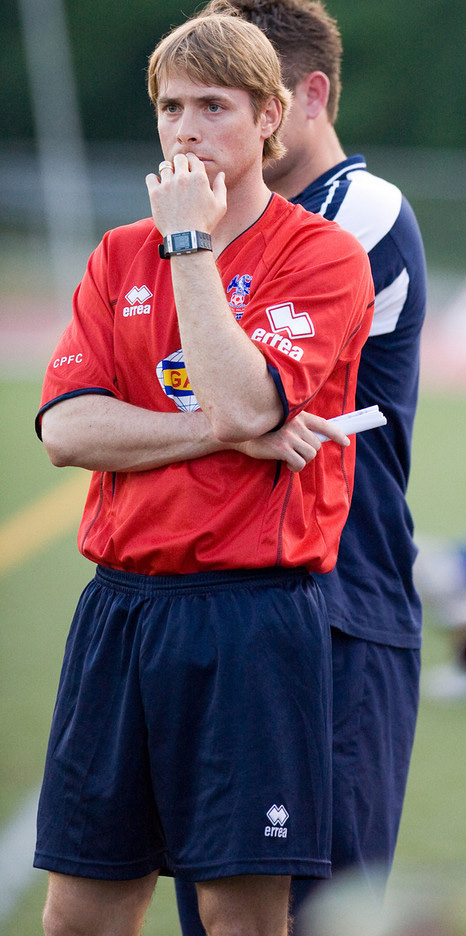

Personal information
- Full name: James Cherneski
- Date of birth: September 12, 1974 (age 52)
- Place of birth: Baltimore, Maryland, United States
- Height: 5 ft 10 in (1.78 m)
- Position: Midfielder

Team information
- Current team: Egerton F.C.

College career
Years	Team	Apps	(Gls)
1992–1996	Towson Tigers		

Senior career*
Years	Team	Apps	(Gls)
1997	Baltimore Bays	8	(3)
1998	Eastern Shore Sharks	18	(2)
1999	New Hampshire Phantoms	4	(1)
2000–2001	Rhode Island Stingrays	5	(0)
2002	Worcester Kings	2	(0)
2007–2010	Crystal Palace Baltimore	10	(2)
2017–	Egerton	12	(5)

Managerial career
- 2007–2010: Crystal Palace Baltimore
- 2017–: Egerton
- * Club domestic league appearances and goals as of February 27, 2018

Jim Cherneski (born September 12, 1974, in Baltimore, Maryland) is an American soccer player, currently player-coach for Egerton, initially alongside Jlloyd Samuel and Dean Gorré. After the death of Samuel in May 2018, and departure of Gorré to manage Suriname, he took the job outright assisted by Nathan Ellington and Emerson Boyce.

== TRUSOX ==
Cherneski invented Trusox in 2010. They are socks that help grip a players sock to their cleat or shoe. Players that wear Trusox include: Gareth Bale, Luis Suarez, Robin van Persie, Arjen Robben, and Jerome Boateng.

== Career ==
=== Youth and college ===
When Cherneski was nine years old he moved to Florida, where he was coached on various youth teams including the Countryside Cosmos coached by Richard Dieckman, Peter Mellor, Steve Heighway, Gordon Hill and Derek Smethurst. Cherneski was a starting defender for the Florida Class 4A state high school champions in 1991, and after a brief and ultimately unsuccessful trial at English side Brighton and Hove Albion, played college soccer at Towson University alongside Pete Medd, leading the team to a Top 15 Division 1 NCAA National Ranking and serving as captain during his senior year.

=== Professional ===
After a brief coaching stint at Towson, Cherneski subsequently played for many years in the USL, having stints with the Baltimore Bays, the Eastern Shore Sharks, the New Hampshire Phantoms, the Rhode Island Stingrays and the Worcester Kings.

After having taken several years off from soccer to concentrate on family issues, Cherneski received an email from a former college coach that ultimately inspired him to set up his own team in his hometown of Baltimore. Whilst in England on a college tour in 2006, Cherneski met with a representative from Crystal Palace, who were interested setting up a team somewhere else in the world. Over the course of the following year representatives from Palace flew over to America, ultimately resulting in the creation of Crystal Palace Baltimore.

Cherneski became player-coach of the team prior to its inaugural season in 2007, in which they finished fifth, and took the team to its first post-season playoff campaign in 2008, where they ultimately lost in the USL2 semi finals to the Charlotte Eagles. In addition to managing the team, Cherneski still occasionally makes playing appearances. Cherneski scored two goals in a 6–3 loss to FC Tampa Bay in the last game of Baltimore's 2010 USSFD2 regular season campaign.

== Career statistics ==
(correct as of October 2, 2010)

Club	Season	League			Cup			Play-Offs			Total		
Club	Season	Apps	Goals	Assists	Apps	Goals	Assists	Apps	Goals	Assists	Apps	Goals	Assists
Baltimore Bays	1997	8	3	?	?	?	?	?	?	?	8	3	?
Eastern Shore Sharks	1998	18	2	?	?	?	?	?	?	?	18	2	?
New Hampshire Phantoms	1999	4	1	?	?	?	?	?	?	?	4	1	?
Rhode Island Stingrays	2000–2001	5	0	?	?	?	?	?	?	?	5	0	?
Worcester Kings	2002	2	0	?	?	?	?	?	?	?	2	0	?
Crystal Palace Baltimore	2007	3	0	0	0	0	0	-	-	-	3	0	0
Crystal Palace Baltimore	2008	4	0	0	1	0	0	0	0	0	5	0	0
Crystal Palace Baltimore	2009	1	0	0	0	0	0	0	0	0	1	0	0
Crystal Palace Baltimore	2010	2	2	0	0	0	0	0	0	0	2	2	0
Total	2007–present	10	2	0	1	0	0	0	0	0	12	2	0
Career Totals	1997–present	48	8	?	1	0	0	?	?	?	49	8	?
