= Harold Urquijo =

Colombian footballer (born 1988)

Personal information
- Full name: Harold Joseph Urquijo Vanstrahlengs
- Date of birth: 16 May 1988 (age 38)
- Place of birth: Barranquilla, Colombia
- Positions: Attacking midfielder; striker

Senior career*
Years	Team	Apps	(Gls)
2006–	Academia	31	(9)
2007–2008	Crystal Palace Baltimore (loan)	49	(14)
- * Club domestic league appearances and goals as of 1 June 2008 ‡ National team caps and goals as of 09:42, 9 May 2007 (UTC)

Harold Joseph Urquijo Vanstrahlengs (born 16 May 1988) is a skillful Colombian footballer. He plays as a forward currently playing for Academia FC.

== Club career ==
Harold moved to Columbus GA, USA at the beginning of 2006. At the age of 17 years, he became a professional player in Colombia's second division playing for the Academia FC from Santa fe de Bogota, Colombia main City.

Harold was 3 times national champion league amateur in category U-15, U-16 and U-17. Years 2003, 2004 and 2005. He scored more than 55 goals in 3 years.

== International career ==
In 2004, he was selected for the Colombia National U-17 Team. He is now a Colombia U20 international.
