= Pete Medd =

American soccer player (born 1976)

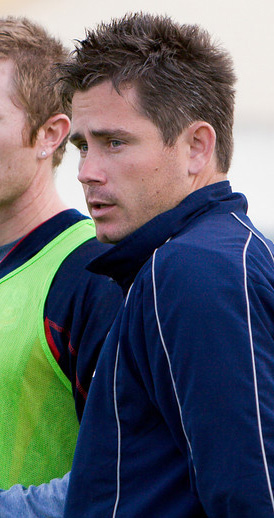

Personal information
- Full name: Peter Medd
- Date of birth: February 21, 1976 (age 50)
- Place of birth: Middletown, Maryland, United States

College career
Years	Team	Apps	(Gls)
1994–1998	Towson Tigers		

Senior career*
Years	Team	Apps	(Gls)
1999	Delaware Wizards	0	(0)
1999–2001	Baltimore Blast (indoor)	1	(0)

Managerial career
- 1998–2001: Towson Tigers (assistant)
- 2001–: CCBC Essex Knights
- 2007–2009: Crystal Palace Baltimore
- * Club domestic league appearances and goals as of 03/04/2008

Pete Medd is an American retired soccer player who was the president of Crystal Palace Baltimore. He also served as the team's co-manager along with Jim Cherneski from 2007 to 2009.

== Youth ==
Pete Medd graduated from Middletown High School. He was the former Maryland State High School Player of the Year and led his team to the State Championship Title in 1993. In 1994, he entered Towson University where he played from 1994 to 1998. He was a four-year starter, regional first team selection and captain of Towson University. He helped lead Towson to a Division 1 Top 15 NCAA National Ranking.

== Player ==
In 1999, Medd spent a single season with the Delaware Wizards of USISL but never featured in a game. He was also the 1999 First Round Draft Pick for the Baltimore Blast of the National Professional Soccer League. He only played in one game for the Blast during the 2000–2001 season.

== Coach ==
In 1999, Medd became an assistant coach at Towson University, a position he held until 2001. That year, he moved to Essex Community College where he was the school's head coach. During his tenure, he led the team to a National Top 5 Ranking and was two time East Region Coach of the Year. In 2007, he was self-hired as the head coach of Crystal Palace Baltimore, a USL Second Division team associated with English club Crystal Palace F.C. The club discontinued operations in 2010.
