= Last Chance (2012 film) =

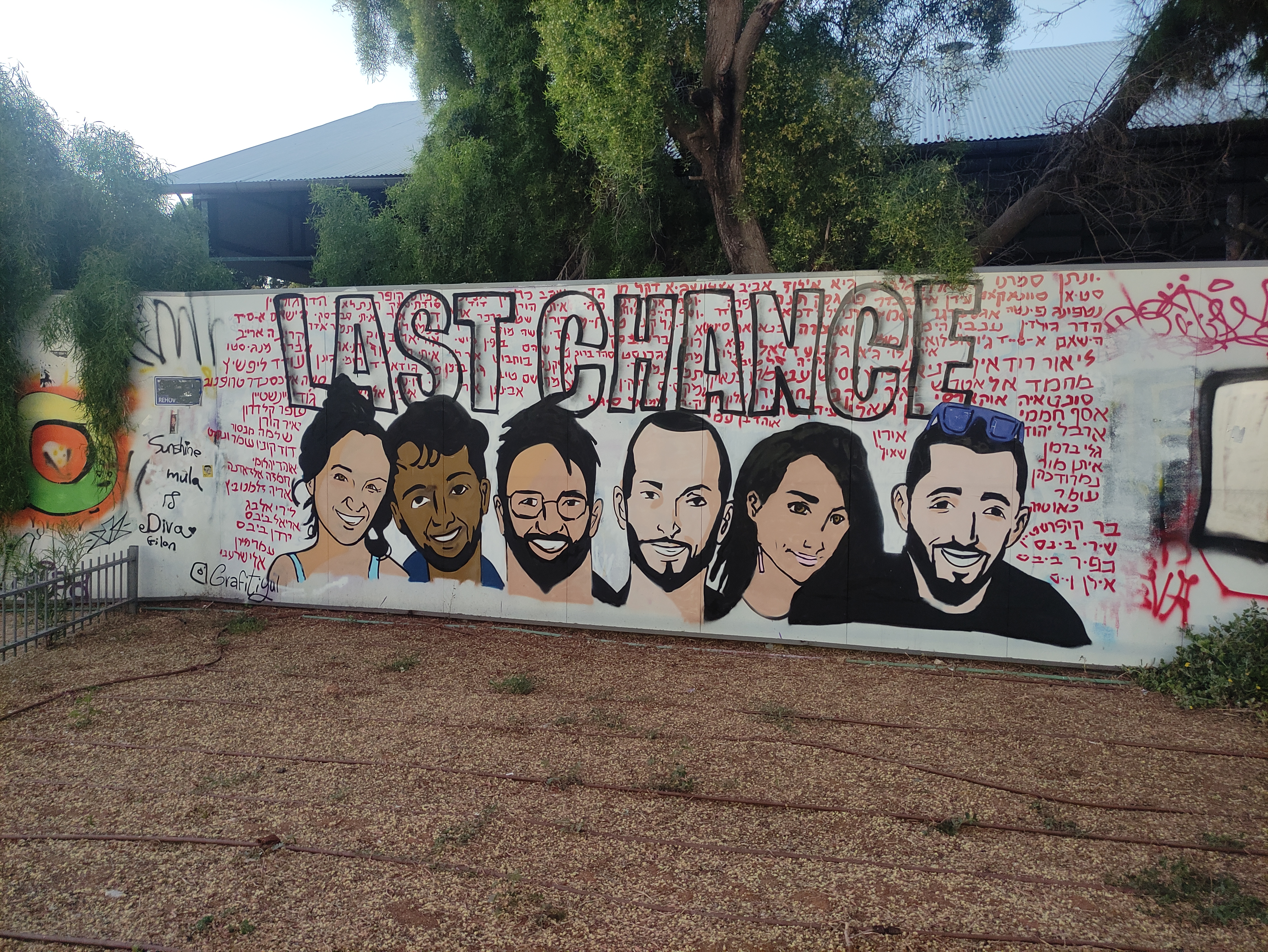
A mural depicting 'Last Chance' by Grafitiyul

Last Chance (French: Une dernière chance) is a 2012 documentary by Paul-Émile d'Entremont about five LGBT people seeking the right of asylum in Canada in order to escape persecution or homophobic violence in their homelands. Subjects in the film include a transgender woman who was institutionalized by her family in Lebanon, an LGBT person jailed in Egypt, as well as Trudi, a Jamaican lesbian who was "correctively raped" at gunpoint. Last Chance was produced by the National Film Board of Canada.

D'Entremont conceived the idea for the film while in Jordan, working on his previous film, Reema, aller-retour. The film took ten years to make, including three years of principal photography. Trudi's was the last story to be filmed. Montreal immigration and refugee lawyer Noel St. Pierre was also among those interviewed in the film.

== Release ==
The film premiered at the 2012 Atlantic Film Festival. It was also streamed free of charge at NFB.ca from December 7 to 9, 2012, to mark Human Rights Day. Awards for the film include the La Vague/Léonard Forest award for best medium- or feature-length Acadian film at the Festival international du cinéma francophone en Acadie in Moncton, New Brunswick.
