= Standing on the Line =

- Directed by: Paul-Émile d'Entremont
- Produced by: Christine Aubé; Jac Gautreau
- Starring: Anastasia Bucsis; David Testo; Brock McGillis
- Production company: National Film Board of Canada
- Release date: May 12, 2019 (DOXA)
- Running time: 80 minutes
- Country: Canada
- Language: English

Standing on the Line is a Canadian documentary film, directed by Paul-Émile d'Entremont and released in 2019. Addressing issues of homophobia in the world of sports, figures appearing in the film include speed skater Anastasia Bucsis, soccer player David Testo, and hockey player Brock McGillis.

The film premiered on May 12, 2019 at the DOXA Documentary Film Festival.
