= Marco Terminesi =

Canadian soccer player

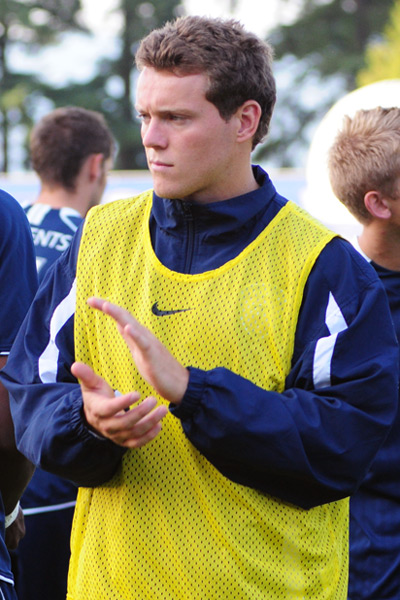

Personal information
- Full name: Marco Terminesi
- Date of birth: September 5, 1984 (age 42)
- Place of birth: Woodbridge, Ontario, Canada
- Height: 6 ft 0 in (1.83 m)
- Position: Forward

College career
Years	Team	Apps	(Gls)
2003–2007	Louisville Cardinals		

Senior career*
Years	Team	Apps	(Gls)
2008	Italia Shooters	20	(3)
2008–2012	Milwaukee Wave (indoor)	63	(71)
2009	Minnesota Thunder	17	(6)
2010–2011	Montreal Impact	10	(0)
2014–2015	Rochester Lancers (indoor)	0	(0)

International career^{‡}
2009	Canada beach soccer		
2012	Canada futsal		
- * Club domestic league appearances and goals as of July 3, 2014 ‡ National team caps and goals as of July 3, 2014

Marco Terminesi (born September 5, 1984) is a Canadian former soccer player.

== Career ==
=== Youth and college ===
Terminesi attended Holy Cross Catholic Academy, and played club soccer for Woodbridge Soccer Club, guiding them to the 1994 and 2000 Robbie International Championship, the 2002 Ontario Cup Championship and the 2003 Showcase Championship.

He played college soccer at the University of Louisville from 2003 to 2007. He was named to the Athletic Director's Honor Roll on three occasions, and was named to the Conference USA All-Freshman team in his debut year, and was the 2008 Big East Scholar Athlete of the Year.

=== Professional ===
He began his career in 2008 with the Italia Shooters in the Canadian Soccer League. After spending a year playing indoor soccer with Milwaukee Wave in the Xtreme Soccer League, Terminesi signed with the Minnesota Thunder of the USL First Division in May 2009. He made his debut for the team on May 31, 2009, in a game against the Puerto Rico Islanders. He then joined the Montreal Impact on July 27, 2010. He was released by Montreal on October 12, 2011.

== Health issues ==
In February 2010 Terminesi announced that he likely had a tumor on the pineal gland in the center of the brain, and would be retiring from soccer indefinitely until such time as his health issues had been solved.

He recovered enough to join Montreal Impact in the USSF Division 2 Professional League for the second half of the 2010 season.

== Career stats ==
Team	Season	League	Domestic League			Domestic Playoffs			Domestic Cup^{1}			Concacaf Competition^{2}			Total		
Team	Season	League	Apps	Goals	Assists	Apps	Goals	Assists	Apps	Goals	Assists	Apps	Goals	Assists	Apps	Goals	Assists
Minnesota Thunder	2009	USL-1	17	6	4	-	-	-	1	0	0	-	-	-	18	6	4
Montreal Impact	2010	USSF D2	7	0	1	2	0	0	-	-	-	-	-	-	9	0	1
		Total USSF D2	24	6	5	2	0	0	1	0	0	-	-	-	27	6	5
