= Wesley Charles =

Vincentian footballer

Personal information
- Full name: Wesley Charles
- Date of birth: 12 December 1975 (age 50)
- Place of birth: Brighton, Saint Vincent and the Grenadines
- Height: 6 ft 3 in (1.91 m)
- Position: Defender

Youth career
- 1991–1994: Brighton All Stars

Senior career*
Years	Team	Apps	(Gls)
1998–2001	Sligo Rovers	61	(2)
2001–2006	Bray Wanderers	134	(6)
2005	→ Rostov (loan)	0	(0)
2006–2008	Galway United	52	(4)
2008–2009	Vancouver Whitecaps	33	(0)
2009	→ Whitecaps Residency (loan)	1	(0)
2010	Montreal Impact	8	(0)
2011	Salthill Devon	1	(0)

International career
1995–2012	Saint Vincent and the Grenadines	94	(4)
- * Club domestic league appearances and goals

Wesley Charles (born 12 December 1975) is a Vincentian footballer. He was born in Brighton, St Vincent and the Grenadines.

== Career ==
=== Europe ===
Charles spent the beginning of the 2000s traveling Europe. His travels started in Ireland, where he first joined Bray Wanderers in November 2000 after spending two seasons with Sligo Rovers, where he was voted Player of the Year in 2003.

In July 2005, Charles signed for Russian Premier League club Rostov on loan for the remainder of their season, with an option to make the move permanent on a two-year contract at the end of it. He then returned to Republic of Ireland and Bray Wanderers. Charles then signed for Galway United in July 2006. He was appointed club captain for the 2007 season. He was released by Galway United in July 2008.

In March 2011, Charles returned to Europe and signed for League of Ireland First Division side Salthill Devon.

=== Canada ===
On 9 July 2008, he was released by Galway United. Two days later he signed by the Vancouver Whitecaps of the United Soccer Leagues First Division. On 12 October 2008, he helped the Whitecaps capture their second USL First Division Championship beating the Puerto Rico Islanders 2–1 in Vancouver

On 30 September 2008, Charles was called up for the USL First Division All-League Team. On 18 December the Whitecaps announced the contract extensions of Charles for the 2009 season.

On 22 July 2009, Charles was released by the Whitecaps after a second incident with a teammate in just over a month. The first incident with a teammate occurred during a home game on 12 June. Charles was involved in an altercation with teammate Charles Gbeke, which both players were fined and handed suspensions as a result. The second incident took place when Charles scuffled with teammate Jeff Parke during a training session on 21 July 2009.

On 19 July 2010 Charles signed with the Montreal Impact for the remainder of the 2010 season.

=== International ===
First appeared on the pitch wearing the national team jersey on 30 July 1995 in a match against Trinidad and Tobago. Charles has been capped numerous times at International level for St Vincent and the Grenadines. He played in 10 of 12 World Cup qualifiers in 2000, scoring twice. Charles also captained his country's national team in the 2010 Caribbean Cup.

== Honors ==
Vancouver Whitecaps

- USL First Division: 2008

== Career stats ==
Team	Season	League	Domestic League			Domestic Playoffs			Domestic Cup^{1}			Concacaf Competition^{2}			Total		
Team	Season	League	Apps	Goals	Assists	Apps	Goals	Assists	Apps	Goals	Assists	Apps	Goals	Assists	Apps	Goals	Assists
Vancouver Whitecaps	2008	USL-1	21	0	0	5	0	0	-	-	-	-	-	-	26	0	0
Vancouver Whitecaps	2009	USL-1	12	0	0	-	-	-	3	0	0	-	-	-	15	0	0
Montreal Impact	2010	USSF D2	8	0	0	1	0	0	-	-	-	-	-	-	9	0	0
		Total USSF D2	41	0	0	6	0	0	3	0	0	–	–	–	50	0	0
