= Jordan Seabrook =

American soccer player (born 1987)

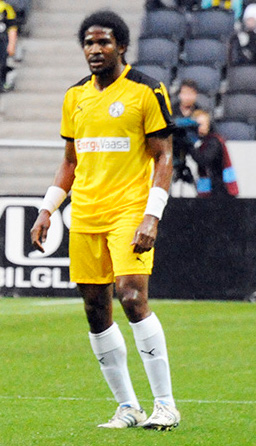
- Seabrook in 2015

Personal information
- Full name: Jordan Akil Seabrook
- Date of birth: June 27, 1987 (age 39)
- Place of birth: Indianapolis, Indiana, United States
- Height: 5 ft 10 in (1.78 m)
- Positions: Winger; forward

College career
| Years | Team | Apps | (Gls) |
| 2005–2008 | South Florida Bulls | 85 | (31) |

Senior career*
| Years | Team | Apps | (Gls) |
| 2008 | Bradenton Academics | 11 | (1) |
| 2009–2010 | Crystal Palace Baltimore | 25 | (3) |
| 2011–2012 | Harrisburg City Islanders | 15 | (0) |
| 2012 | Enköping | 12 | (0) |
| 2012 | Haka | 11 | (0) |
| 2013–2015 | VPS | 87 | (15) |

International career
| 2006 | United States U-20 | 3 | (0) |
- * Club domestic league appearances and goals as of January 14, 2016

Jordan Seabrook (born June 27, 1987) is an American soccer player.

== Career ==
=== College and amateur ===
Seabrook attended North Central High School in Indianapolis, Indiana, and played college soccer at the University of South Florida, where he was 1 four-time All Big East selection, and helped his team to the 2005 Regular Season Championship, the 2008 Big East Tournament Championship, and three NCAA Tournament qualifications in 2005, 2007 and 2008.

During his college years Seabrook also played with Bradenton Academics in the USL Premier Development League.

=== Professional ===
Seabrook took part in the 2009 adidas MLS Player Combine, and was selected the fourth round (51st overall) of the 2009 MLS SuperDraft by Colorado Rapids, but was ultimately not offered a developmental contract by the club.

Instead, he signed with Crystal Palace Baltimore in the USL Second Division; he made his professional debut on April 17, 2009, in Baltimore's season opening 0–0 tie with the Pittsburgh Riverhounds, and went on to make 20 appearances and score three goals in his debut season. On March 16, 2010, Baltimore announced the re-signing of Seabrook to a new contract for the 2010 season.

== Career statistics ==
(correct as of May 20, 2010)

| Club | Season | League | | | Cup | | | Play-Offs | | | Total | | |
| Club | Season | Apps | Goals | Assists | Apps | Goals | Assists | Apps | Goals | Assists | Apps | Goals | Assists |
|---|---|---|---|---|---|---|---|---|---|---|---|---|---|
| Crystal Palace Baltimore | 2009 | 20 | 3 | 1 | 1 | 0 | 0 | - | - | - | 21 | 3 | 1 |
| Crystal Palace Baltimore | 2010 | 6 | 0 | 0 | 0 | 0 | 0 | - | - | - | 6 | 0 | 0 |
| Total | 2009–present | 26 | 3 | 1 | 1 | 0 | 0 | - | - | - | 27 | 3 | 1 |
| Career Total | 2009–present | 26 | 3 | 1 | 1 | 0 | 0 | - | - | - | 27 | 3 | 1 |
