= Filipe Pastel =

Portuguese footballer

Pastel
Personal information
- Full name: Hélder Filipe da Costa Soares
- Date of birth: 10 February 1982 (age 44)
- Place of birth: Santa Eulália, Portugal
- Height: 1.72 m (5 ft 8 in)
- Position: Midfielder

Youth career
- 1990–2000: Freamunde

Senior career*
| Years | Team | Apps | (Gls) |
| 2000–2004 | Freamunde | 99 | (4) |
| 2004–2006 | Vizela | 45 | (2) |
| 2006–2009 | Freamunde | 81 | (0) |
| 2009–2010 | Feirense | 8 | (1) |
| 2010 | Montreal Impact | 19 | (1) |
| 2010–2011 | Ermis | 14 | (0) |
| 2011–2012 | Penafiel | 0 | (0) |
| 2012–2013 | Famalicão | 20 | (0) |
| Total | | 286 | (8) |

International career
| 2001 | Portugal U18 | 5 | (1) |
- * Club domestic league appearances and goals

Hélder Filipe da Costa Soares (born 10 February 1982), commonly known as Pastel, is a Portuguese retired footballer who played as a central midfielder.

== Club career ==
Born in Santa Eulália de Barrosas, Vizela, Braga District, Pastel started his senior career with S.C. Freamunde in the third division. In January 2004 he signed with fellow league club F.C. Vizela, helping it promote to the second level in his first full season but appearing in only five games in the process.

In summer 2006, Pastel returned to Freamunde and achieved another promotion to division two, going on to be first-choice in the following two seasons. Subsequently, he joined C.D. Feirense also in that tier but, on 27 January 2010, moved across the Atlantic to Canada and signed with Montreal Impact of the USSF Division 2 Professional League.

After one season in Cyprus, Pastel returned to his country and signed for F.C. Penafiel in the second division. His input during the season consisted of 67 minutes in a 0–0 home draw against C.F. Os Belenenses, for the campaign's Portuguese League Cup.

On 8 July 2012, Pastel returned to the third division after joining F.C. Famalicão.

== Club statistics (Canada only) ==
| Team | Season | League | Domestic League | | | Domestic Playoffs | | | Domestic Cup^{1} | | | Concacaf Competition^{2} | | | Total | | |
| Team | Season | League | Apps | Goals | Assists | Apps | Goals | Assists | Apps | Goals | Assists | Apps | Goals | Assists | Apps | Goals | Assists |
|---|---|---|---|---|---|---|---|---|---|---|---|---|---|---|---|---|---|
| Montreal Impact | 2010 | USSF D2 | 19 | 1 | 1 | 1 | 0 | 0 | 4 | 0 | 0 | - | - | - | 24 | 1 | 1 |
| | | Total USSF D2 | 19 | 1 | 1 | 1 | 0 | 0 | 4 | 0 | 0 | - | - | - | 24 | 1 | 1 |
