= Andrei Bădescu =

Romanian footballer

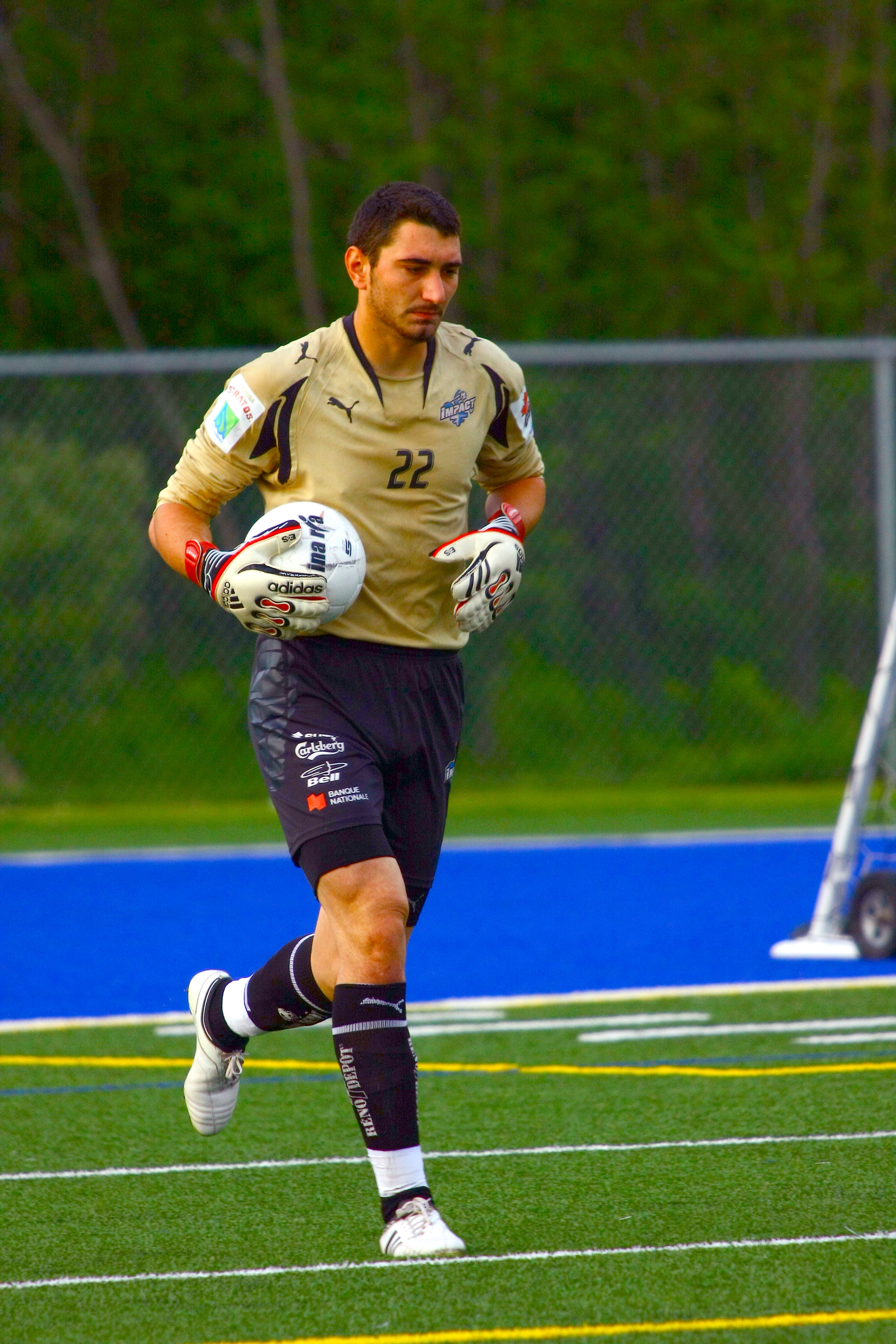

Personal information
- Full name: Andrei Octavian Bădescu
- Date of birth: 12 February 1985 (age 41)
- Place of birth: Craiova, Romania
- Height: 1.98 m (6 ft 6 in)
- Position: Goalkeeper

Youth career
- 1998–2000: FC Universitatea Craiova

Senior career*
Years	Team	Apps	(Gls)
2000–2000	Știința CFR Craiova	27	(0)
2000–2000	→ MAT Craiova (loan)	5	(0)
2000–2002	FC Universitatea Craiova	0	(0)
2002–2003	Extensiv Craiova	4	(0)
2003–2005	Știința CFR Craiova	35	(0)
2005–2005	→ Bellinzona (loan)	0	(0)
2005–2006	"Gică Popescu" Soccer School	30	(0)
2006–2006	Poli Timișoara 2	0	(0)
2006–2007	→ "Marcel Băban" Soccer School Jimbolia	36	(0)
2007–2007	Botoșani	7	(0)
2007–2008	"Marcel Băban" Soccer School Jimbolia	15	(0)
2009–2011	Montreal Impact	1	(0)
2009–2010	→ Trois-Rivières Attak	21	(0)
2010	→ Montreal Impact Academy	5	(0)
Total		186	(0)

Managerial career
- 2010–2011: UQAM Soccer (GK Coach)
- 2010–2011: Montreal Impact Academy (GK Coach)
- 2011–2012: Capital City (GK Coach/assistant)
- 2012–2014: Kingston (GK Coach/assistant)
- 2015–: West Ottawa SC (GK Coach)
- * Club domestic league appearances and goals as of 7 March 2018

Andrei Octavian Bădescu (born 12 February 1985) is a Romanian former professional footballer whose career was largely played in Romania, with brief stints in Switzerland and Canada.

== Playing career ==
=== Romania ===
Born in Craiova, Bădescu began his playing career there for Universitatea Craiova in the 1st Romanian League. He played for the Junior Team Group '83 in 1998 and one year later played for Under 21 before being called up to the senior team a few times. In the summer of 2000 he left for Stiinta CFR Craiova in Liga IV, where he played 27 games in the regular season and helped the team get promoted to Liga III.

Two years later he signed with FC Extensiv Craiova in Liga II but played only 4 games. Eight months later he came back to Stiinta CFR Craiova (today Gaz Metan CFR Craiova) in Liga III where he played 35 games and he was named under 21 player of the League (GDS.ro). After one and a half seasons, AC Bellinzona loaned him for half a season but he sustained several injuries and did not play in any official games.

Bădescu returned to the Romania in 2005 when he signed for Liga III team Gica Popescu Soccer School, for whom he played in 30 games. In 2006, Bădescu signed with Poli Timișoara and soon after he got loaned to Marcel Baban Soccer School in the Romanian Liga III where he played 36 games in the regular season and was named Best Goalkeeper of the League. In June 2007, he signed with Botoşani of Liga II where he played 7 friendly games before badly injuring his knee.

=== Canada ===
Bădescu was most recently the 3rd goalkeeper of the Montreal Impact and the 1st goalkeeper of the second team Trois-Rivieres Attak of the Canadian Soccer League with which he won the regular season and the CSL Play-off Final against Serbian White Eagles. With Montreal Impact he won the USSF D2 Pro League in 2009. On 17 March 2010 he re-signed with the Montreal Impact for two more seasons. He and the club mutually agreed to terminate his contract on 17 February 2011 due to multiple injuries.

== Coaching career ==
- 2010–2011 UQAM Soccer (GK Coach)
- 2010–2011 Montreal Impact Academy
- 2011–2012 Capital City F.C. (Goalkeeper Coach\assistant)
- 2012–2014 Kingston FC (Goalkeeper coach\assistant)
- 2015–present West Ottawa SC(Head Goalkeeper Coach)
