= Sergio Flores (born 1985) =

American soccer player

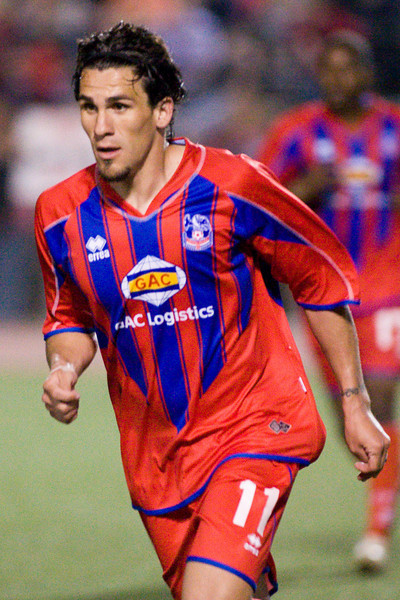

Personal information
- Full name: Dustin Sergio Flores
- Date of birth: February 22, 1985 (age 41)
- Place of birth: Smithfield, Utah, U.S.
- Positions: Left winger; striker

Senior career*
Years	Team	Apps	(Gls)
2005	Real Salt Lake	0	(0)
2007–2008	Crystal Palace Baltimore	32	(15)

International career
- USA U-18
- USA U-20
- * Club domestic league appearances and goals

Dustin Sergio Flores (born February 22, 1985) is an American former soccer player of Bolivian descent. He played as either a striker or a winger.

Flores has represented the United States at U18 and U20 levels. He has been on the roster of Real Salt Lake, The Strongest of Bolivia and Chacarita Juniors of Argentina. He signed for Crystal Palace Baltimore in 2007. In five pre-season games for Crystal Palace Baltimore in their first ever season, Flores scored eight goals.

He retired from professional soccer at the age of 23, and currently lives in Maryland.

== Career statistics ==
(correct as 27 September 2008)

Club	Season	League			Cup			Play-Offs			Total		
Club	Season	Apps	Goals	Assists	Apps	Goals	Assists	Apps	Goals	Assists	Apps	Goals	Assists
Crystal Palace Baltimore	2007	20	3	3	1	0	0	-	-	-	21	3	3
Crystal Palace Baltimore	2008	12	2	1	2	0	0	1	0	0	15	2	1
Total	2007–2008	32	5	4	3	0	0	1	0	0	36	5	4
