= Adam Braz =

Canadian soccer player (born 1981)

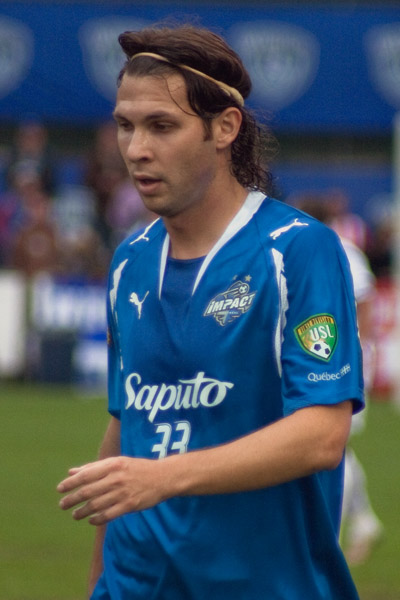
- Braz with the Montreal Impact in 2008

Personal information
- Date of birth: June 7, 1981 (age 45)
- Place of birth: Montreal, Quebec, Canada
- Height: 6 ft 2 in (1.88 m)
- Position: Defender

Youth career
- 1999–2001: Fairfield Stags

Senior career*
Years	Team	Apps	(Gls)
2002	Montreal Impact	20	(0)
2003	Västerås SK	26	(0)
2004–2006	Montreal Impact	62	(0)
2007	Toronto FC	13	(0)
2008–2010	Montreal Impact	63	(0)

International career
2004–2007	Canada	12	(0)
- * Club domestic league appearances and goals

Adam Braz (born June 7, 1981) is a Canadian former professional soccer player who last served as Technical Director of the Montreal Impact of Major League Soccer. Braz played on the Canada national team and in stints with Toronto FC in the Major League Soccer and the Montreal Impact in the USSF Division 2 Professional League.

== Club career ==
=== College ===
Braz was born in Montreal, Quebec, Canada, and is Jewish. He attended Herzliah High School in Ville Saint-Laurent.

He attended St. John's University in New York and played college soccer at Fairfield University for the Fairfield Stags men's soccer team from 1999 to 2001. In 2000, Braz was a first team all-MAAC defender and helped the Stags earn a No. 15 national ranking. Braz received a bachelor's degree from the Fairfield University Dolan School of Business in 2001.

=== Professional ===
In 2002, he signed with the Montreal Impact in the USL A-League. The following season he went abroad to play with Västerås SK in the Superettan. Braz returned to Montreal in 2004 and helped the Impact win the USL A-League Championship.

Braz was one of the first players to sign with MLS expansion franchise Toronto FC in the 2006–07 soccer offseason and made his MLS debut in Toronto FC's first game, a 2–0 loss to Chivas USA. Braz was transferred back to the Montreal Impact at the end of the 2007 season. During the 2009 USL season Braz contributed by helping the Impact clinch a playoff spot under new head coach Marc Dos Santos. He helped the Impact reach the finals where Montreal would face the Vancouver Whitecaps FC, this marking the first time in USL history where the final match would consist of two Canadian clubs. In the final Braz helped the Impact win the series 6–3 on aggregate. The victory gave the Impact their third USL Championship and also the victory marked Braz's second USL Championship. On October 6, 2009 Braz received Unsung Hero Award during the team's 2009 awards banquet. On November 26, 2009 Braz signed a new two-year deal with the club.

Braz announced his retirement on March 14, 2011 to become a team manager for the Impact.

== International career ==
Braz made his debut for Canada in a January 2004 friendly match against Barbados and, has earned a total of 12 caps. In July 2005, he was selected to play for Canada in the Gold Cup, where he played in all three games.

== Career statistics ==
Appearances and goals by club, season and competition
Team	Season	League			Playoffs		National cup		Continental		Total	
Team	Season	Division	Apps	Goals	Apps	Goals	Apps	Goals	Apps	Goals	Apps	Goals
Montreal Impact	2002	USL-1	20	0	4	0					24	0
Västerås SK	2003	Superettan	26	0							26	0
Montreal Impact	2004	USL-1	18	0	4	0					22	0
Montreal Impact	2005	USL-1	20	0	2	0					22	0
Montreal Impact	2006	USL-1	24	0	2	0					26	0
Montreal Impact	Total		62	0	8	0	0	0	0	0	70	0
Toronto FC	2007	MLS	13	0	-						13	0
Montreal Impact	2008	USL-1	19	0	3	0	4	0	7	0	33	0
Montreal Impact	2009	USL-1	22	0	5	0	3	0			30	0
Montreal Impact	2010	USSF D2	22	0	4	3	0	0			26	3
Montreal Impact	Total		63	0	12	3	7	0	7	0	89	3
Career total			184	0	24	3	7	0	7	0	222	3

== Honours ==
Montreal Impact

- USL First Division Championship: 2004, 2009

== See also ==
- List of select Jewish football (association; soccer) players
