= Adam Ruud =

American soccer player

Personal information
- Full name: Adam Ruud
- Date of birth: August 16, 1983 (age 43)
- Place of birth: Hanover Park, Illinois, United States
- Height: 5 ft 10 in (1.78 m)
- Position: Forward

College career
Years	Team	Apps	(Gls)
2002	Loyola Ramblers		
2003	DuPage Chaparrals		
2004–2005	Charlotte 49ers		

Senior career*
Years	Team	Apps	(Gls)
2006	Chicago Fire	0	(0)
2007	Charlotte Eagles	18	(4)
2008	Cleveland City Stars	19	(4)
- * Club domestic league appearances and goals as of 1 May 2009

Adam Ruud (born August 16, 1983) is an American soccer player.

== Career ==
=== College and amateur ===
Ruud attended Glenbard High School, and played college soccer at the Loyola University Chicago, the College of DuPage and the University of North Carolina at Charlotte. He was named to the first-team NSCAA, and was a NJCAA All-American at DuPage, and was named to the All-Conference USA first-team, the All-South Region third-team and the NCCSIA All-State team at Charlotte.

=== Professional ===
Ruud played with Chicago Fire's reserve team in the MLS Reserve Division in 2006 before beginning his professional career in 0001, playing with the Charlotte Eagles in the USL Second Division.

He joined the Cleveland City Stars of the USL First Division in 2008, them win the USL Second Division title, before being released at the end of the season.
