= Stephen DeRoux =

Jamaican footballer (born 1983)

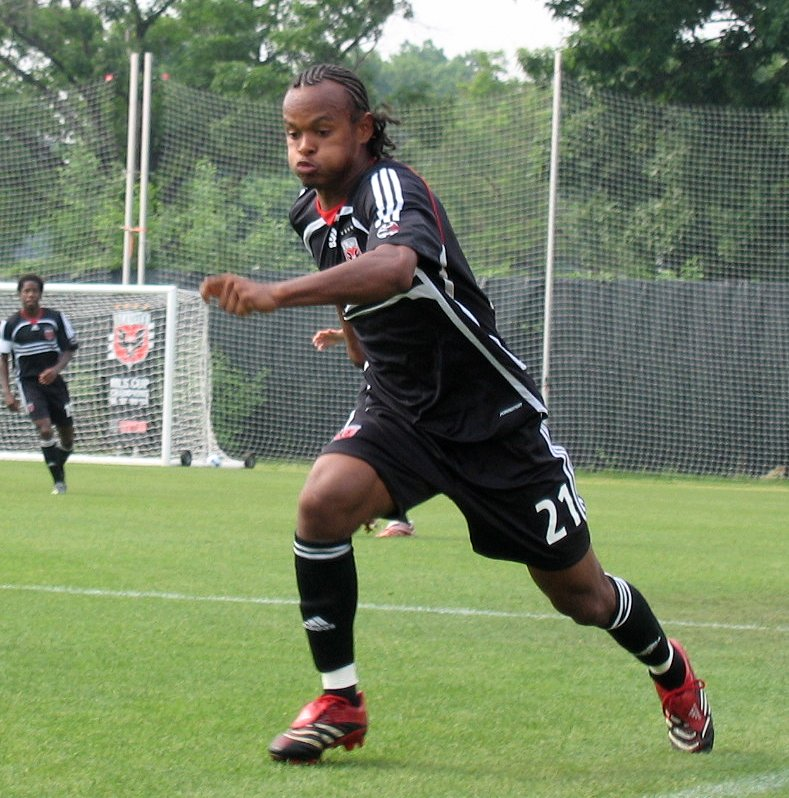

Personal information
- Full name: Stephen DeRoux
- Date of birth: 13 December 1983 (age 42)
- Place of birth: Saint Mary, Jamaica
- Height: 5 ft 9 in (1.75 m)
- Positions: Defender; left winger

College career
Years	Team	Apps	(Gls)
2002–2004	Prince George's Owls		

Senior career*
Years	Team	Apps	(Gls)
2005–2007	D.C. United	10	(0)
2008	Minnesota Thunder	29	(1)
2009–2010	Montreal Impact	38	(0)
2011–2014	Baltimore Blast (indoor)	71	(16)
2012	Puerto Rico Islanders	7	(0)
2013–2015	San Antonio Scorpions	74	(1)
2016	Milwaukee Wave (indoor)	5	(2)
2016	Indy Eleven	0	(0)
2018–2019	Utica City FC (indoor)	23	(2)
2019–2021	Florida Tropics (indoor)	24	(2)
2021–2022	Baltimore Blast (indoor)	1	(0)
- * Club domestic league appearances and goals as of 16 December 2022

Stephen DeRoux (born 3 December 1983) is a Jamaican footballer.

== Career ==
=== College ===
DeRoux played college soccer at Prince George's Community College, in Largo, Maryland, where he was a NSCAA Second Team All-American in 2002.

=== Professional ===
DeRoux signed a developmental contract with D.C. United on 15 September 2005, and subsequently played in 10 games for the team, but following the conclusion of the 2007 season, United did not exercise DeRoux's contract option. Although he was invited to rejoin United during the 2008 pre-season training camp to attempt to re-earn a roster spot, he was not offered a contract with the team.

DeRoux spent the 2008 season with Minnesota Thunder in the USL First Division, playing 29 games and scoring 1 goal, before moving to Montreal Impact in 2009. During the 2009 USL season DeRoux contributed by helping the Impact clinch a playoff spot under new head coach Marc Dos Santos. He was also selected to the All-League Second Team of the Year. He helped the Impact reach the finals where Montreal would face the Vancouver Whitecaps FC, this marking the first time in USL history where the final match would consist of two Canadian clubs. In the final DeRoux helped the Impact win the series 6–3 on aggregate. The victory gave the Impact their third USL Championship and also the victory marked his first USL Championship. On 6 October 2009 DeRoux received the Newcomer of the Year Award during the team's 2009 awards banquet.

On 12 January 2011, Montreal Impact technical director Nick De Santis confirmed on CKAC that DeRoux would not be back with the Impact for the 2011 season.

DeRoux joined Florida Tropics SC on 20 May 2019.

== Honors ==
=== Montreal Impact ===
- USL First Division Championship (1): 2009

== Career stats ==
Team	Season	League	Domestic League			Domestic Playoffs			Domestic Cup^{1}			Concacaf Competition^{2}			Total		
Team	Season	League	Apps	Goals	Assists	Apps	Goals	Assists	Apps	Goals	Assists	Apps	Goals	Assists	Apps	Goals	Assists
D.C. United	2005	MLS	-	-	-	-	-	-	-	-	-	-	-	-	-	-	-
D.C. United	2006	MLS	4	0	0	-	-	-	-	-	-	-	-	-	4	0	0
D.C. United	2007	MLS	6	0	0	-	-	-	1	0	0	-	-	-	7	0	0
Minnesota Thunder	2008	USL-1	29	1	2	2	1	1	2	0	1	-	-	-	33	2	4
Montreal Impact	2009	USL-1	22	0	1	6	0	0	3	0	0	-	-	-	31	0	1
Montreal Impact	2010	USSF D2	16	0	1	-	-	-	4	0	0	-	-	-	20	0	1
		Total MLS	10	0	0	–	–	–	1	0	0	–	–	–	11	0	0
		Total USSF D2	67	1	4	8	1	1	9	0	1	–	–	–	84	2	6
