= Gary Brooks =

Jamaican soccer player

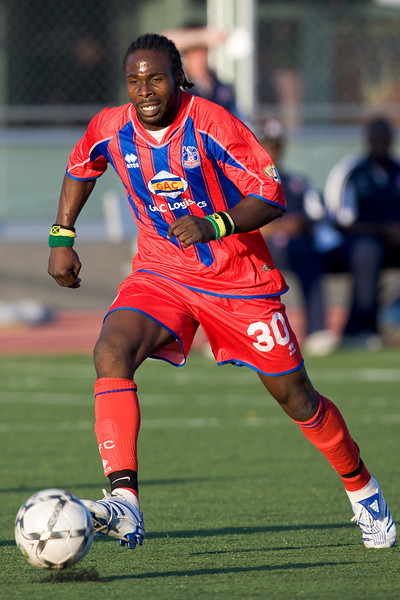

Personal information
- Full name: Gary Orlando Brooks
- Date of birth: 5 August 1980 (age 46)
- Place of birth: Kingston, Jamaica
- Height: 6 ft 1 in (1.85 m)
- Position: Forward

Senior career*
Years	Team	Apps	(Gls)
2002	Virginia Beach Mariners	23	(5)
2003–2005	Philadelphia KiXX (indoor)	66	(17)
2004–2005	Atlanta Silverbacks	23	(4)
2005–2006	California Cougars (indoor)	20	(13)
2006	Vancouver Whitecaps	4	(0)
2007–2008	Crystal Palace Baltimore	23	(14)
2007–2008	New Jersey Ironmen (indoor)	9	(2)
2008–2010	Rockford Rampage (indoor)	22	(11)
2009	Real Maryland Monarchs	14	(6)
2010	Philadelphia KiXX (indoor)	6	(0)
2010	Crystal Palace Baltimore	26	(4)
2011–2012	Norfolk SharX (indoor)	21	(3)
- * Club domestic league appearances and goals as of 1 October 2010

Gary Brooks (born 8 May 1983) is a retired former Jamaican soccer player.

== Career ==
=== Professional ===
Brooks began his professional career in 2002 with the USL First Division with the Virginia Beach Mariners, and went on to play for the Atlanta Silverbacks and the Vancouver Whitecaps before to signing for Crystal Palace Baltimore prior to their inaugural 2007 season.

In his first season in Baltimore he was named in the USL Second Division All-League First-Team for scoring seven goals in nine games and also recording two assists, while in his second season he was named in the USL Second Division All-League Second-Team.

He signed for the Real Maryland Monarchs in 2009, and moved to Crystal Palace Baltimore in 2010.

=== Indoor Soccer ===
Brooks also had extensive professional indoor soccer experience, having made his indoor soccer debut with the then Major Indoor Soccer League's (MISL) Philadelphia Kixx in 2004. He signed with the California Cougars in 2006 before competing in the former MISL with the New Jersey Ironmen for the 2007 and 2008 seasons. Brooks played in the National Indoor Soccer League for Rockford Rampage. He finished his career with Norfolk SharX.

== Career statistics ==
(correct as of 2 October 2010)

Club	Season	League			Cup			Play-Offs			Total		
Club	Season	Apps	Goals	Assists	Apps	Goals	Assists	Apps	Goals	Assists	Apps	Goals	Assists
Crystal Palace Baltimore	2007	9	7	2	0	0	0	-	-	-	9	7	2
Crystal Palace Baltimore	2008	14	7	1	3	1	0	2	1	0	19	9	1
Total	2007–2008	23	14	3	3	1	0	2	1	0	28	16	3
Real Maryland Monarchs	2009	14	6	3	2	0	1	1	1	0	17	7	4
Total	2009	14	6	3	2	0	1	1-	1	1-	15	7	3
Crystal Palace Baltimore	2010	26	4	0	1	0	0	-	-	-	27	4	0
Total	2010–present	26	4	0	1	0	0	-	-	-	27	4	0
Career Total	2009–present	63	24	6	6	1	1	3	2	0	72	27	7
