= Paul-Émile d'Entremont =

Canadian documentary filmmaker

Paul Émile d'Entremont is a Canadian documentary filmmaker, best known for his 2012 film about LGBT refugees, Last Chance.

His other films include Alone, Together (2000), Le Confessionnal réinventé (2004) and Reema, There and Back (2006). His film Naufrages (2009, Productions Phare-est) was nominated for three Prix Gémeaux (the French language equivalent of Gemini awards), including Best Social Documentary, Best Cinematography (documentary), and Best Music in a Documentary. He won the awards for Best New Director at the Atlantic Film Festival in 2000 for Alone, Together, and the Golden Sheaf for Best Film at the Yorkton Film Festival in 2007 for Reema, There and Back. His work has been distributed by the National Film Board, Télévision de Radio-Canada and RDI. In December 2012, the National Film Board offered free viewing of Last Chance on its website for the international Human Rights Day.

His newest film, Standing on the Line, premiered in 2019.

He is currently a news director with Ici Radio-Canada's investigative newsmagazine and documentary series Enquête.
