= Crystal Palace Baltimore =

- Founded: 2006
- Dissolved: 2010
- Stadium: Paul Angelo Russo Stadium; Towson, Maryland
- Capacity: 5,000
- Chairman: Randall Medd
- Head Coach: Jim Cherneski
- League: USSF Division 2 Professional League
- 2010: Regular season: 6th, NASL; Overall: 12th Playoffs: DNQ

Crystal Palace Baltimore was an American professional soccer team based in Baltimore, Maryland, US. Founded in 2006, the club was originally named Crystal Palace USA and was affiliated with English side Crystal Palace.

The club was a member of the old USL Second Division and the temporary USSF Division 2 Professional League. Following its 2010 season, the club severed ties with the London-based Crystal Palace and announced plans to take a one-year hiatus in order to execute a reorganization involving a complete rebranding and the possibility of a new soccer-specific stadium in downtown Baltimore. On December 3, 2010, the franchise stated it intended to relaunch for the start of the 2012 North American Soccer League campaign. However no further announcements were forthcoming from the club.

== History ==
=== Genesis of the franchise ===
Crystal Palace Baltimore was established on May 5, 2006, by the English Crystal Palace's then Chairman Simon Jordan, Vice Chairman Dominic Jordan, Chief Executive Phil Alexander, Director of Football Bob Dowie and Jim Cherneski, the new American-based club's Sporting Director. This was the first trans-Atlantic partnership of its kind in North America. The Baltimore franchise originally intended to be in the USL Premier Development League (PDL). Instead, it joined the USL Second Division (USL-2) when it began playing a full schedule of contests in 2007. The team's original official title was Crystal Palace F.C. USA until January 27, 2010, when it was changed to the more popularly accepted name Crystal Palace Baltimore.

=== The two Crystal Palaces, head-to-head ===
Crystal Palace Baltimore's debut, its only match played in 2006, was against its sister club at the United States Naval Academy's Glenn Warner Soccer Facility in Annapolis, Maryland on July 15. The team consisted of the local Maryland-based universities' top players, including Chris Seitz, A. J. DeLaGarza and Maurice Edu. Rade Kokovic scored the Americans' first-ever goal to tie the game in the 30th minute, but the home side eventually lost 3–1.

The second contest between the two squads resulted in Baltimore surrendering a goal in the 28th minute and being shut out 1–0 at Selhurst Park on September 7, 2007.

The third match of the series was played at Regency Furniture Stadium in Waldorf, Maryland on July 13, 2009. Val Teixeira tied the score at one in the 18th minute and Jordan Seabrook brought the team within a goal at 3–2 in the 59th, but the Americans dropped a 5–2 decision.

=== Lamar Hunt U.S. Open Cup ===
In its initial appearance in the Lamar Hunt U.S. Open Cup (LHUSOC) tournament, Crystal Palace Baltimore lost its first-round game to the Ocean City Barons 1–0 at Carey Stadium in Ocean City, New Jersey on June 12, 2007. The squad played most of the contest with a one-man disadvantage after Harold Urquijo was red carded in the 22nd minute. The lone goal was surrendered just before halftime.

The 2008 run began on June 10 at Azusa Pacific University in Azusa, California with a 2–1 win over the Los Angeles Legends. Pat Healey scored both goals for the winning side, the second one breaking a 1–1 deadlock in the 89th minute. Two weeks later on June 24, Palace earned another away victory by outlasting the Harrisburg City Islanders in a penalty shootout 2–2 (3–1). Baltimore became the only USL-2 team to advance to the quarterfinals of that year's tournament with a 2–0 upset of the New York Red Bulls at Broadneck High School in Annapolis on July 1. The goalscorers were Andrew Marshall in the 18th minute and Gary Brooks in the 75th. Even though they took the defending Cup champion New England Revolution to a penalty shootout, Palace's efforts to reach the semifinals fell short 1–1 (3–5) at Veterans Stadium in New Britain, Connecticut on July 8.

Palace failed to progress beyond the First Round in each of the next two years, being shut out on the road both times. In a match postponed a day due to a soggy pitch caused by rainstorms, they fell at Ocean City again 3–0 on June 10, 2009. They took the Richmond Kickers into overtime on June 15, 2010, but surrendered a Matthew Delicate goal in the 119th minute and lost 1–0.

=== USL Second Division ===
Crystal Palace Baltimore's 2007 inaugural year in USL-2 began with a four-game losing streak. After dropping a 4–1 decision in its season opener at the Charlotte Eagles on April 20, Palace endured three straight home shutouts. This was followed up by a seven-match undefeated stretch, but with only three victories. They closed out the campaign winning six of its final seven contests, powered by the midseason acquisition of Brooks, the team's leading scorer with seven goals in only nine games. He and Matthew Mbuta, who contributed five goals, were named to the All-League First Team. Baltimore finished in fifth place, but barely missed the playoffs because it was the final season in which only the top four sides qualified.

The beginning of 2008 was the reverse of the previous year as Baltimore ran off five victories, the first four being shutouts. Despite surrendering the same number of goals as they produced, the ballclub's ascent to fourth place ensured its first postseason appearance. Like in the U.S. Open Cup seven weeks earlier, its first rounder at home with the defending USL-2 champion City Islanders on August 13 was a 2–2 stalemate that was decided by penalty kicks, with Baltimore prevailing 7–6. Three nights later on August 16, they were denied the opportunity to play in the championship match with a 2–1 loss to the top-seeded Eagles in Charlotte. Shintaro Harada, Palace's lone representative on the All-League First Team, scored in the fifth minute for an early lead the squad would take into the second half.

Palace entered 2009 without Brooks, whose contract was not renewed even though his seven goals in each of the previous two campaigns led the team both times. Baltimore, scoring a league-low 16 goals, fell to sixth place and missed the playoffs. They were hurt by a pair of slumps. After opening with two wins and a draw, they went without a victory in seven of its next eight contests (1–2–5). They finished winless in six of seven (1–2–4), including being shut out in its final three games. Teixeira was the top scorer with only five goals. The highlight of the season was Harada receiving All-League First Team honors again for leading the circuit's second-best defense.

=== USSF Division-2 Professional League ===
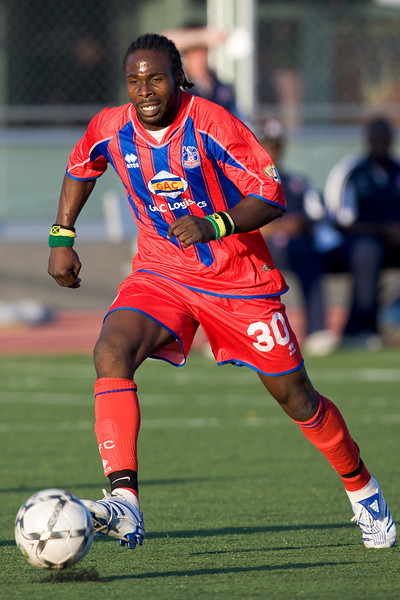
Gary Brooks was Crystal Palace Baltimore's top scorer in 2010

Previously expected to move up to the USL First Division (USL-1), Crystal Palace Baltimore announced on November 20, 2009, that they instead would join the new North American Soccer League (NASL). After lawsuits were filed and heated press statements exchanged, the United States Soccer Federation (USSF) declared they would sanction neither the NASL nor USL-1 for the coming year, and ordered both to work together on a plan to temporarily allow its teams to play a 2010 season. The interim solution was announced on January 7, 2010, with the new USSF Division 2 Professional League comprising clubs from both quarreling circuits.

Pete Medd, the co-manager with Cherneski since the franchise's inaugural campaign, relinquished his sideline duties on April 14, two days before Palace's season opener. He continued as team president, a role he had also held since 2007. The voluntary move enabled him to concentrate more on the ballclub's business development.

Due to a system in which eight of twelve teams qualified for the postseason, Palace was not eliminated from playoff contention until three games remained on its 2010 schedule. They finished the season in the USSF Division-2 cellar with a 6–6–18 record, the worst in franchise history. They were outscored 55–24, shut out in 14 of 30 matches and ended the season with a club-record eight consecutive losses. Its 2–2–11 performance at home is attributed to the team hosting contests in five different ballparks within the Baltimore–Washington Metropolitan Area. After starting with four at UMBC Stadium, they eventually played four more at the Maryland SoccerPlex and one each at Baltimore Polytechnic Institute's Lumsden-Scott Stadium and the Ridley Athletic Complex before settling at Calvert Hall College High School's Paul Angelo Russo Stadium for a total of five.

=== Reorganization in 2011 ===
Crystal Palace Baltimore announced on December 3, 2010, the end of its four-year relationship with the English club Crystal Palace and that it would not field a team for the 2011 North American Soccer League season in order to reorganize its operations. The severing of ties was attributed to the financial difficulties that resulted from the (then) Football League championship team entering administration. At the center of the reorganization was the possibility of a new soccer-specific stadium in downtown Baltimore. The rebranding of the franchise began with plans on changing its name, and it intended to relaunch for the start of the 2012 NASL campaign. However, as previously noted there have been no announcements or actions from the organization to indicate if it will ever re-launch in the NASL or any other league. So as of today, the club is believed to be officially dissolved.

=== Year-by-year ===
Year	Division	League	Regular season	Playoffs	Open Cup	Avg. attendance
2007	3	USL Second Division	5th	did not qualify	First Round	477
2008	3	USL Second Division	4th	Semi Finals	Quarter Finals	1,287
2009	3	USL Second Division	6th	did not qualify	First Round	1,181
2010	2	USSF Division 2	6th, NASL (12th)	did not qualify	First Round	1,073

=== Staff ===
Nation	Name	Role
United States	Randall Medd	chairman
United States	Pete Medd	president
United States	Jim Cherneski	founder, sporting director and head coach
United States	Keith Lupton	vice-president, general manager
Cameroon	Karim Moumban	goalkeeping coach
England	Glen Johnson	goalkeeping coach and equipment manager
United States	Jen Pagliaro	club administrator
United States	Matt Smith	academy director
United States	Todd J. Tredinnick	team doctor
England	James Calder	director of communications
United States	Keith Tabatznik	academy curriculum director

== Stadiums ==
- Glenn Warner Soccer Facility; Annapolis, Maryland (2006 – one match)
- Navy–Marine Corps Memorial Stadium; Annapolis, Maryland (2007)
- Maryland SoccerPlex; Germantown, Maryland (2007 – one match, 2010 – four matches)
- Lawrence E. Knight Stadium at Broadneck High School; Annapolis, Maryland (2008 – one match)
- Lumsden-Scott Stadium at Baltimore Polytechnic Institute; Baltimore, Maryland (2008, 2010 – one match each)
- UMBC Stadium; Catonsville, Maryland (2008–2010)
- Paul Angelo Russo Stadium at Calvert Hall College High School; Towson, Maryland (2010 – five matches)
- Ridley Athletic Complex; Baltimore, Maryland (2010 – one match)

== See also ==
- Crystal Palace L.F.C.
