= 2006 Vancouver Whitecaps FC season =

Vancouver Whitecaps FC 2006 soccer season

Vancouver Whitecaps FC
2006 season
- Chairman: Greg Kerfoot
- Head coach: Bob Lilley
- USL First Division: 4th
- USL–1 Playoffs: Champions
- Voyageurs Cup: 3rd
- Highest home attendance: 5,722 (SO) (3 times)
- Lowest home attendance: 4, 540; June 30 vs PT
- Average home league attendance: 5,085
Home colours	Away colours

The 2006 Vancouver Whitecaps FC season was the club's 21st year of existence (or 31st if counting the NASL Whitecaps), as well as their 14th as a Division 2 club in the franchise model of US-based soccer leagues. 2006 was Bob Lilley's second season as head coach, and they started the season with many draws while the team sorted itself out. In the last ten games after some player additions, the Whitecaps lost only two of their last ten games. In the playoffs Vancouver went on a run as the fourth seed. They first had a play-in round series against Miami FC Blues and Romário before upsetting regular season champion or Commissioner's Cup winner and Canadian rival Montreal Impact with two second half of overtime goals in the second leg away in La belle province. The first goal scorer was Eduardo Sebrango, a striker out of favour in Montreal in 2005 (he was the 2004 leading goal scorer on the Impact) that Vancouver signed in the off season. In the single championship game at the regular season runner-up Rochester Rhinos' new home, PAETEC Park, the Whitecaps scored via an own goal just before half time and then put the game out of reach with two more goals to win 0 – 3.

The Whitecaps FC Women ruthlessly won the 2006 W-League Championship, the club's second, finishing with almost twice as many regular season points as the runner up in the Western Conference before 5 – 0 and 3 – 0 wins achieved the title. The club also had four USL Super Y League teams play in the finals held in Florida. This was the first time a club has won both the men's and women's United States D2 championships in the same year.

The league was a single table competition although the schedule was not balanced; it was home and away with additional matches against Seattle, Portland, and Minnesota. Head to head results were the first tie-breaker. Average attendance increased for the fifth year in a row and was above 5,000 for the second time since 2001. Two double-headers were played with the Whitecaps Women, the USL W-League.

The club also spent the year raising its local profile. The team moved its live radio broadcasts to a new start up sports radio channel in 2006 for one year. The Whitecaps Waterfront Stadium was in the local media before the season started although attempts to have the stadium ready for the 2007 FIFA U-20 World Cup were annulled with an unusually long six month review process. The stadium was news-worthy again in June 2006 as it was recommended for inclusion in municipal development planning; note not approved for the planning process. Once approved for the planning process, the process including rezoning would have taken an additional two years. The stadium process started in 2003 and as of 2014 has not been built regardless of completely private financing. The Whitecaps also partnered with a player marketing service for the player development program. The club had sixteen teams in their club structure during 2006.

== Schedule and results ==
=== Tables ===
Commissioner's Cup, bye to semifinal round of playoffs
Bye to semifinal round of playoffs
First round of playoffs

Pos	Club	Pts	Pld	W	L	T	GF	GA	GD	H2H Pts
1	Montreal Impact	51	28	14	5	9	31	15	+16	
2	Rochester Raging Rhinos	50	28	13	4	11	34	21	+13	
3	Charleston Battery	46	28	13	8	7	33	25	+8	CHA: 4 pts VAN: 1 pt
4	Vancouver Whitecaps	46	28	12	6	10	40	28	+12	CHA: 4 pts VAN: 1 pt
5	Miami FC	39	28	11	11	6	47	44	+3	
6	Puerto Rico Islanders	38	28	10	10	8	38	36	+2	
7	Seattle Sounders	37	28	11	13	4	42	48	−6	
8	Atlanta Silverbacks	35	28	10	13	5	36	42	−6	
9	Virginia Beach Mariners	32	28	8	12	8	26	37	−11	VAB: 7 pts TOR: 4 pts
10	Toronto Lynx	32	28	8	12	8	30	36	−6	VAB: 7 pts TOR: 4 pts
11	Portland Timbers	27	28	7	15	6	25	39	−14	POR: 9 pts MIN: 3 pts
12	Minnesota Thunder	27	28	7	15	6	34	45	−11	POR: 9 pts MIN: 3 pts

Expanded Table

Overall								Home						Away					
Pld	Pts	W	L	T	GF	GA	GD	W	L	T	GF	GA	GD	W	L	T	GF	GA	GD
28	46	12	6	10	40	28	+12	8	1	5	24	10	+14	4	5	5	16	18	−2

Last updated: April 26, 2010
Source: uslsoccer.com
Pld = Matches played; Pts = Points; W = Matches won; T = Matches tied; L = Matches lost; GF = Goals for; GA = Goals against; GD = Goal difference

=== Pre-season ===
Win Draw Loss

The Whitecaps opened their four-week training camp on March 27, 2006, at Simon Fraser University. The preseason schedule was announced March 14, 2006 including a double header of the men's and women's teams versus the UVic Vikes.

March 28, 2006	Fraser Valley Soccer League (FVSL) All-Stars	1–0	Vancouver Whitecaps FC	Surrey, British Columbia
18:45 PST	Cam Willmets 55'	Report		Stadium: Newton Athletic Park; Attendance: 1,000

March 31, 2006	Trinity Western University	1–3	Vancouver Whitecaps FC	Langley, British Columbia
19:00 PST	Drew Roddy 57'	Report	Jeff Clarke 5'; Steve Kindel 25'; Sita-Taty Matondo 89'	Stadium: Spartans Sports Complex; Attendance: 479

April 2, 2006	University of British Columbia	0–1	Vancouver Whitecaps FC	Vancouver, British Columbia
15:00 PST		Report	Martin Nash 65'	Stadium: Thunderbird Stadium

April 6, 2006	VMSL All-Stars	0–2	Vancouver Whitecaps FC	Tsawwassen, British Columbia
18:30 PST		Report	Joey Gjertsen 1'; Sita-Taty Matondo 62'	Stadium: Brandrith Park

April 7, 2006	UVic Vikes	0–4	Vancouver Whitecaps FC	Victoria, British Columbia
18:00 PST		Report	Alfredo Valente 14'; Jay Alberts 47'; Sita-Taty Matondo 57', 73'	Stadium: Centennial Stadium,

April 14, 2006	Vancouver Whitecaps FC	3–1	Seattle Sounders	Chilliwack, British Columbia
19:00 PST	Adrian Cann 2'; Jason Jordan 8'; Corey Woolfolk 71'	Report	Jacob Besagno 87'	Stadium: Exhibition Park; Attendance: 2,022

=== USL-1 ===
==== Results by round ====
Round	1	2	3	4	5	6	7	8	9	10	11	12	13	14	15	16	17	18	19	20	21	22	23	24	25	26	27	28
Ground	H	H	A	H	H	H	A	A	H	A	A	A	A	H	H	A	A	A	A	H	A	A	H	A	H	H	H	H
Result	W	W	D	W	D	D	L	D	D	D	W	D	L	W	W	L	L	D	W	L	W	W	W	L	D	D	W	W

Source: uslsoccer.com
A = Away; H = Home; W = Win; D = Draw; L = Loss

April 22, 2006 1	Vancouver Whitecaps FC	1–0	Portland Timbers	Burnaby, BC
22:00 ET	Joey Gjertsen 17'	Report		Stadium: Swangard Stadium; Attendance: 5,722; Referee: Steve DePiero

April 29, 2006 2 Voyageurs Cup	Vancouver Whitecaps FC	2–0	Toronto Lynx	Burnaby, BC
22:00 ET	Joey Gjertsen 45'; Sita-Taty Matondo 82'	Report		Stadium: Swangard Stadium; Attendance: 4,555; Referee: David Gantar

May 5, 2006 3	Portland Timbers	1–1	Vancouver Whitecaps FC	Portland, Oregon
20:00 ET	Chad Bartlome 21'	Report	Tony Donatelli 53'	Stadium: PGE Park; Attendance: 5,448; Referee: Colin Arblaster

May 14, 2006 4	Minnesota Thunder	0–3	Vancouver Whitecaps FC	Saint Paul, Minnesota
22:00 ET		Report	Alfredo Valente 20'; Joey Gjertsen 45'; David Testo 53'	Stadium: James Griffin Stadium; Attendance: 4,556; Referee: Martin Reid

May 22, 2006 5	Vancouver Whitecaps FC	0–0	Rochester Rhinos	Burnaby, BC
22:00 ET		Report		Stadium: Swangard Stadium; Attendance: 4,839; Referee: Silviu Petrescu

May 26, 2006 6	Vancouver Whitecaps FC	2–2	Seattle Sounders	Burnaby, BC
22:00 ET	Joey Gjertsen 18'; Own goal 32'	Report	Cam Weaver 23', 73'	Stadium: Swangard Stadium; Attendance: 4,658; Referee: Kevin Duliba

May 27, 2006 7	Seattle Sounders	1–0	Vancouver Whitecaps FC	Seattle
22:00 ET	Andrew Gregor 43' (pen.)	Report		Stadium: Qwest Field; Attendance: 2,998; Referee: Yader Reyes

June 3, 2006 8	Minnesota Thunder	1–1	Vancouver Whitecaps FC	Saint Paul, Minnesota
19:05 ET	Nathan Knox 8'; Dustin Branan (red card) 81'	Report	Joey Gjertsen 57'	Stadium: James Griffin Stadium; Attendance: 1,808; Referee: Colin Arblaster

June 9, 2006 9	Vancouver Whitecaps FC	2–2	Miami FC Blues	Burnaby, BC
20:00 ET	Jeff Clarke 8'; Geordie Lyall (red card) 30'; Steve Kindel 90'	Report	Mario Rodríguez 63'; Romário 90'	Stadium: Swangard Stadium; Attendance: 5,722; Referee: Hu Liu

June 10, 2006 10	Portland Timbers	0–0	Vancouver Whitecaps FC	Portland, Oregon
22:00 ET		Report		Stadium: PGE Park; Attendance: 6,298; Referee: Fotis Bazakos

June 15, 2006 11	Virginia Beach Mariners	1–2	Vancouver Whitecaps FC	Virginia Beach, Virginia
19:00 ET	Thomas Woods 69'	Report	John Jones 28'; James Alberts 57'	Stadium: Virginia Beach Sportsplex; Attendance: 1,404; Referee: Charles Mitchell

June 17, 2006 12	Atlanta Silverbacks	2–2	Vancouver Whitecaps FC	Atlanta
19:30 ET	Machel Millwood 65'; Jason McLaughlin 78'	Report	Martin Nash 13'; David Morris 64'	Stadium: Atlanta Silverbacks Park; Attendance: 2,167; Referee: Roni Canales

June 18, 2006 13	Charleston Battery	1–0	Vancouver Whitecaps FC	Charleston, South Carolina
18:00 ET	Gavin Glinton 54'	Report		Stadium: Blackbaud Stadium; Attendance: 3,283; Referee: Tony Crush

June 25, 2006 14	Vancouver Whitecaps FC	1–0	Puerto Rico Islanders	Burnaby, BC
22:00 ET	James Alberts 73'	Report	Marco Velez (red card) 51'	Stadium: Swangard Stadium; Attendance: 5,722; Referee: Jonathan Lavergne

June 30, 2006 15	Vancouver Whitecaps FC	3–0	Portland Timbers	Burnaby, BC
22:00 ET	David Testo 9', 63'; Tony Donatelli 66'	Report		Stadium: Swangard Stadium; Attendance: 4,540; Referee: Carol Anne Chenard

July 3, 2006 16	Rochester Rhinos	2–0	Vancouver Whitecaps FC	Rochester, New York
19:35 ET	Jonny Steele 67'; Matthew Delicate 71'	Report		Stadium: Marina Auto Stadium; Attendance: 11,119; Referee: Kevin Barci

July 5, 2006 17 Voyageurs Cup	Toronto Lynx	2–1	Vancouver Whitecaps FC	Etobicoke, Ontario
12:00 ET	Jamie Dodds 20'; Damien Pottinger 31'	Report	Sita-Taty Matondo 29'	Stadium: Centennial Park Stadium; Attendance: 2,235; Referee: Rob Antle

July 7, 2006 18 Voyageurs Cup	Montreal Impact	1–1	Vancouver Whitecaps FC	Montreal
20:00 ET	Mauricio Vincello 90'	Report	Steve Kindel 21'	Stadium: Complexe sportif Claude-Robillard; Attendance: 12,435; Referee: Domenic Scali

July 14, 2006 19	Minnesota Thunder	2–1	Vancouver Whitecaps FC	Saint Paul, Minnesota
20:05 ET	Matt Schmidt 90'	Report	Anthony Noreiga 22'; Steve Kindel 80'	Stadium: James Griffin Stadium; Attendance: 3,412; Referee: Colin Arblaster

July 16, 2006 20 Voyageurs Cup	Vancouver Whitecaps FC	0–1	Montreal Impact	Burnaby, BC
22:00 ET		Report	Joel John Bailey 55'	Stadium: Swangard Stadium; Attendance: 5,417; Referee: David Gantar

August 4, 2006 21	Puerto Rico Islanders	1–3	Vancouver Whitecaps FC	Bayamón, Puerto Rico
20:00 ET	Kormac Valdebenito 57' (pen.)	Report	Joey Gjertsen 1'; David Testo 41'; Steve Kindel (red card) 53'; Sita-Taty Matondo 80'	Stadium: Juan Ramón Loubriel Stadium; Attendance: 4,354; Referee: Merritt Guthrie

August 6, 2006 22	Miami FC Blues	2–3	Vancouver Whitecaps FC	Miami
16:00 ET	Mario Rodríguez 18'; Francisco Gomez 67' (pen.)	Report	Joey Gjertsen 22', 48'; David Testo 31'	Stadium: Tropical Park Stadium; Attendance: 1,425; Referee: Mark Kadelack

August 13, 2006 23	Vancouver Whitecaps FC	3–0	Virginia Beach Mariners	Burnaby, BC
22:00 ET	Geordie Lyall 8'; James Alberts 65'; Joey Gjertsen 72'	Report		Stadium: Swangard Stadium; Attendance: 5,380; Referee: Tiger Lui

August 19, 2006 24	Seattle Sounders	2–0	Vancouver Whitecaps FC	Seattle
22:00 ET	Andrew Gregor 32'; Leighton O'Brien 65' (pen.)	Report		Stadium: Qwest Field; Attendance: 3,584; Referee: Kari Seitz

August 26, 2006 25	Vancouver Whitecaps FC	2–2	Minnesota Thunder	Burnaby, BC
22:00 ET	Joey Gjertsen 69'; Steve Kindel 59'	Report	Nathan Knox 67'; Ansu Toure 69'	Stadium: Swangard Stadium; Attendance: 4,889; Referee: John Dela Cruz

August 31, 2006 26	Vancouver Whitecaps FC	1–1	Charleston Battery	Burnaby, BC
22:00 ET	Eduardo Sebrango 30'	Report	Ben Hollingsworth 90'	Stadium: Swangard Stadium; Attendance: 4,765; Referee: Tiger Liu

September 8, 2006 27	Vancouver Whitecaps FC	3–2	Seattle Sounders	Burnaby, BC
22:00 ET	Eduardo Sebrango 40'; Joey Gjertsen 57'; David Testo 63'	Report	Jamal Sutton 30', 88'	Stadium: Swangard Stadium; Attendance: 5,347; Referee: Steve Dipiero

September 10, 2006 28	Vancouver Whitecaps FC	1–0	Atlanta Silverbacks	Burnaby, BC
22:00 ET	Joey Gjertsen 37'	Report		Stadium: Swangard Stadium; Attendance: 5,041; Referee: Silvio Petrescu

=== Post-season ===
==== Bracket ====
Quarterfinals and Semifinals 2-game aggregate
Higher seeded team hosted first game

- Exception: Montreal hosted second game vs Vancouver

Quarterfinals
3	Charleston Battery	2	1	3
6	Puerto Rico Islanders	2	0	2
4	Vancouver Whitecaps	4	2	6
5	Miami FC	1	0	1

Semifinals
2	Rochester Raging Rhinos	1	0	1
3	Charleston Battery	0	0	0
4	Vancouver Whitecaps (a.e.t.)	0	2	2
1	Montreal Impact	0	0	0

Finals
2	Rochester Raging Rhinos	0
4	Vancouver Whitecaps	3

==== Result ====
Play-in Round

September 15, 2006 Leg 1	Vancouver Whitecaps FC	4–1	Miami FC Blues	Burnaby, BC
22:00 ET	David Testo 12'; Ryan Suarez (yellow card) 32'; Joey Gjertsen 35'; Geordie Lyall 44'; Tony Donatelli 88'	Report	Sean Fraser (yellow card) 35'; Romário 64'; Francisco Gomez (yellow card) 72'	Stadium: Swangard Stadium; Attendance: 5,437; Referee: Steve DiPietro

September 17, 2006 Leg 2	Miami FC Blues	0–2 (1–6 agg.)	Vancouver Whitecaps FC	Miami
18:00 ET	J. P. Rodrigues (yellow card) 31'; Stephane Guillaume (yellow card) 52'; Francisco Gomez (yellow card) 72'; Sean Fraser (yellow card) 73'	Report	Ryan Suarez (yellow card) 10'; Eduardo Sebrango 46'; Martin Nash 64'	Stadium: Tropical Park Stadium; Attendance: 2,111; Referee: Mark Greiger

Semi-finals

September 22, 2006 Leg 1	Vancouver Whitecaps FC	0–0	Montreal Impact	Burnaby, BC
22:00 ET	Eduardo Sebrango (yellow card) 80'	Report	Adam Braz (yellow card) 10'; Nevio Pizzolito (red card) 85'	Stadium: Swangard Stadium; Attendance: 5,225; Referee: Mark Budda

September 24, 2006 Leg 2	Montreal Impact	0–2 (a.e.t.) (0–2 agg.)	Vancouver Whitecaps FC	Montreal
19::00 ET	Adam Braz (yellow card) 23'; Mauricio Vincello (yellow card) 95'; David Fronimadis (yellow card) 120'	Report	Eduardo Sebrango (yellow card) 15' (yellow-red card) 116', (goal) 115'; Martin Nash (yellow card) 73'; Sita-Taty Matondo (yellow card) 90'; Geordie Lyall (yellow card) 95'; Tony Donatelli 120'	Stadium: Complexe sportif Claude-Robillard; Attendance: 11,782; Referee: Silviu Petrescu

Final

September 30, 2006	Rochester Rhinos	0–3	Vancouver Whitecaps FC	Rochester, New York
19:00 ET	John Ball (yellow card) 25'; Charles Gbeke (yellow card) 71'; Nate Craft (yellow card) 85'; Mike Ambersley (yellow card) 88'	Report	Nate Craft 45' (o.g.); Tony Donatelli 55'; John Jones (yellow card) 76'; Jeff Clarke (yellow card) 80'; Sita-Taty Matondo 86', (yellow card) 86'	Stadium: Marina Auto Stadium; Attendance: 9,547; Referee: Andrew Chapin

=== Voyageurs Cup ===
Prior to 2008, from when it has been awarded to the Canadian Championship winners, the men's title was decided on regular-season matches between Canada's USL First Division sides.

Pos	Team	Pld	W	D	L	GF	GA	GD	Pts
1	Montreal Impact	4	4	0	0	5	1	+4	12
2	Vancouver Whitecaps FC	4	1	1	2	1	2	−1	4
3	Toronto Lynx	4	0	1	3	1	4	−3	1

=== Cascadia Cup ===
2006
Team	Pld	W	L	D	GF	GA	GD	Pts
Seattle Sounders	8	4	2	2	13	10	+3	14
Vancouver Whitecaps	8	3	2	3	10	8	+2	12
Portland Timbers	8	1	4	3	6	11	−5	6

Source: "Cascadia Cup". cascadiacup.soccer. January 2006.

== Whitecaps Nations Cup ==
Due to the business success of neighbouring rivals' (Portland and Seattle) friendlies and the friendly with Sunderland A.F.C. in 2005 watched by 6,857, the Whitecaps marketed a four team tournament held from July 19–23, 2006. The tournament was organized with the Vancouver Multicultural Society's CultureFest and the local 27th Annual Nations Cup soccer tournament for local amateur soccer enthusiasts. Welsh club Cardiff City FC also played matches in Victoria, Langley, and Seattle. Due to the business success of neighbouring rivals' (Portland and Seattle) friendlies and the friendly with Sunderland A.F.C. in 2005 watched by 6,857, the Whitecaps marketed a four team tournament held from July 19–23, 2006. The tournament was organized with the Vancouver Multicultural Society's CultureFest and the local 27th Annual Nations Cup soccer tournament for local amateur soccer enthusiasts. Welsh club Cardiff City FC also played matches in Victoria, Langley, and Seattle.

July 19, 2006	Vancouver Whitecaps FC	3–1	India national football team	Burnaby, BC
19:00 ET	David Testo 15'; Own goal 38'; David Morris 73'	Report	Sunil Chhetri 45'	Stadium: Swangard Stadium

July 21, 2006	China U-17	0–5	Cardiff City F.C.	Burnaby, BC
19:00 ET				Stadium: Swangard Stadium

July 23, 2006	China U-17	1–2	India national football team	Burnaby, BC
16:00 ET	Tang Jiashu 76'	Report	Pappachen Pradeep 29'; Manjit Singh 66'	Stadium: Swangard Stadium; Attendance: 4,236; Referee: David Gantar

July 23, 2006	Vancouver Whitecaps FC	0–0 (3–1 p)	Cardiff City F.C.	Burnaby, BC
19:00 ET		Report		Stadium: Swangard Stadium; Attendance: 4,236
	Penalties
	Tony Donatelli (penalty scored); Steve Kindel (penalty scored); David Morris (penalty scored)		(penalty missed) Darren Purse; (penalty scored) Kevin McNaughton; (penalty missed) Stephen Thompson; (penalty missed) Michael Chopra

== Staff ==
John Rocha stepped down in August 2006 to focus on the 2007 FIFA U20 World Cup as Vancouver site chairman while continuing to support the Whitecaps in a consulting role.

=== Soccer Operations ===
- President – John Rocha
- General Manager – Bob Lenarduzzi
- Office Manager – Lindsay Puchlik
- Communication Manager – Nathan Vanstone
- Director Sales and Marketing – Rick Ramsbottom
- Men's Head Coach – Bob Lilley
- Men's Assistant Coach – Michael Toshack
- Reserve Team Men's Head Coach – Nick Dasovic
- Women's Head Coach – Bob Birarda
- Reserve Team Women's Head Coach –
- Director Youth Operations – Dan Lenarduzzi

== Roster ==
2006 marked the most significant changes to the Whitecaps roster in the 20 years of club history with twelve new players signed at the start of the season. The American coach Bob Lilley expanded the Whitecaps' recruiting more to the US college ranks, MLS, other USL-1 teams, and overseas. He opined that the rate of the improvement in the league meant that the Whitecaps did not have time if they wanted to be competitive this year to develop local players, so the Whitecaps changed to a buyer in the player marketplace. Local signings such as 2006's cohort of Andrew Corrazza, Diaz Kambere, and others stopped sticking with the team going forward. As the profile of the club increased and ambitions for Division 1 grew, coaches had more pressure for immediate results and fewer local connections. This was the beginning of a trend that gradually removed locally developed long-time career players from the Whitecaps first team through release or retirement that probably culminated with the retirement of Martin Nash after the 2010 season.

Twelve year Whitecap veteran defender and local Chris Franks retired after a spell with Doncaster Rovers F.C. Carlo Corazzin was also released. Previous starting goalkeeper Five year Whitecap Mike Franks who didn't get any further minutes after recovering from injury in 2005 was also released. Defender Mark Watson was released prior to the 2006 season and midfielder Nick Dasovic retired before the 2005 season to coach.

On March 28, the Whitecaps announced the trade of Daniel Antoniuk who was with Portland Timbers in 2005 to Montreal Impact for Eduardo Sebrango. Bob Lilley was familiar with Eduardo Sebrango from his time coaching the Impact and Sebrango was recovering from injuries and saw little playing time in 2005. As advertised in the signing announcement, he would score important, timely goals in big games both for and against the Whitecaps in the years to come. They also announced the signing of 2005 MLS Columbus Crew midfielder/forward David Testo.

On April 7, 2006, the Whitecaps signed fullback John Jones and defender Anthony Noreiga. The whitecaps signed locals Diaz Kambere and Stefan Leslie to amateur contracts as well as American midfielder Tony Donatelli, and forward Canadian Sita-Taty Matondo, Another key signing was the English Premier League Newcastle United goalkeeper Tony Caig on April 13, 2006. Due to injuries in midfield and forward requiring one of the regular defenders to move to midfield, in June the Whitecaps also signed defender Ryan Saurez.

The 2006 team was billed as much more offensive minded with greater depth at the forward and midfield positions. The line up was relatively settled with 25 players getting playing minutes and seven getting about 2000 minutes or more. James Alberts, Jeff Clarke, Joey Gjertsen, and David Morris appeared in all 28 games for the Whitecaps. Despite preseason speculation the goal scoring was again singular, this year Joey Gjertsen was fourth in the league with 12 goals. Martin Nash and Joey Gjertsen led the team in assists with both in the top ten league-wide. Gjertsen's year for the champion Whitecaps, fourth in goals (12) and second in assists (7), earned him a league most valuable player award.

=== Goalkeeper stats ===
No.	Nat.	Player	Total					USL-1					Playoffs				
No.	Nat.	Player	MIN	SV	GA	GAA	SO	MIN	SV	GA	GAA	SO	MIN	SV	GA	GAA	SO
1	(England)	Tony Caig	2550	75	26	0.918	11	2070	63	25	1.086	7	480	12	1	0.1875	4
1	(United States)	Josh Wicks	450	20	3	0.60	2	450	20	3	0.60	2					

|} Updated to match played October 20, 2013
As of the end of the season.

=== Player statistics ===
No.	Pos.	Name	Apps	Minutes	Goals	Assists	Shots	Fouls	Yellow card	Red card			
No.	Pos.	Name	0	GK	(United States) Josh Wicks	5	450	0	0	0	0	0	0
1	GK	(England) Tony Caig	28	2550	0	0	0	2	0	0			
2	DF	(Canada) Jeff Clarke	33	2743	1	2	17	36	4	0			
3	MF	(United States) Steve Klein	31	2725	0	2	4	13	1	0			
4	DF	(Canada) Adrian Cann	22(5)	1963	0	2	9	28	0	0			
6	MF	(United States) James Alberts	23(7)	1698	3	4	28	17	1	0			
7	MF	(Canada) Martin Nash	33	2689	2	7	8	32	3	0			
8	DF	(Canada) Steve Kindel	29(1)	2525	4	2	21	37	3	1			
9	MF	(Canada) Alfredo Valente	10(7)	810	1	1	12	20	1	0			
11	MF	(United States) David Testo	19(7)	1698	7	3	41	42	2	0			
12	MF	(Canada) Geordie Lyall	24(1)	2108	2	1	12	27	6	1			
13	MF	(Canada) Tino Cucca	0(5)	47	0	0	1	0	0	0			
14	MF	(United States) Tony Donatelli	10(19)	1270	4	3	16	19	1	0			
16	DF	(Canada) Kevin Harmse	0	0	0	0	0	0	0	0			
16	DF	(Jamaica) Gary Brooks	(4)	78	0	0	2	3	1	0			
17	FW	(United States) Joey Gjertsen	31(2)	2580	13	8	67	14	0	0			
18	FW	(Cuba) Eduardo Sebrango	10(3)	1043	3	1	30	16	2	1			
19	DF	(Canada) Sita-Taty Matondo	4(19)	554	3	0	23	23	2	0			
20	DF	(Canada) David Morris	13(19)	1498	1	2	16	21	0	0			
22	DF	(United States) John Jones	14(7)	1260	1	0	11	16	5	0			
23	FW	(United States) Corey Woolfolk	(1)	6	0	0	0	1	0	0			
24	DF	(Canada) Diaz Kambere	2(1)	146	0	0	2	4	1	0			
25	DF	(Trinidad and Tobago) Anthony Noreiga	4(12)	518	1	0	2	8	1	0			
26	FW	(Canada) Jason Jordan	4(4)	396	0	2	6	5	0	0			
27	MF	(Canada) Stefan Leslie	2(3)	160	0	0	3	6	1	0			
29	GK	(Canada) Srdjan Djekanovic	0	0	0	0	0	0	0	0			
33	DF	(United States) Ryan Suarez	13(5)	1312	0	0	2	11	4	0			
—	–	Opponent Own goals	–	–	1	–	–	–	–	–			

Updated February 28, 2014
- Note this list includes only players that have dressed in the eighteen.
- Note brackets indicate substitute appearances.
- Note statistics are for league and playoffs (not preseason or friendlies).
