= All-time Vancouver Whitecaps roster =

This list comprises all players who have participated in at least one league match for Vancouver Whitecaps since the USL began keeping archived records in 2003. Players who were on the roster but never played a first team game are not listed; players who appeared for the team in other competitions (Voyageurs Cup, Open Canada Cup, CONCACAF Champions League, etc.) but never actually made an USL appearance are noted at the bottom of the page where appropriate.

This list does not include the NASL Whitecaps players unless they played in US Division 2 which the Vancouver 86ers began play in 1993, nor the MLS Whitecaps players. This list also includes players in the USSF D2 Pro League for the year of 2010. This list cannot be relied upon to include all players prior to 2003, nor Vancouver 86ers players who played in Canada's Division 1 Canadian Soccer League (1987-1992).

A "†" denotes players who only appeared in a single match.
A "*" denotes players who are known to have appeared for the team prior to 2003.

== Roster ==
=== A ===
- (United States) Sola Abolaji
- (Jamaica) Nicholas Addlery
- (France) Mouloud Akloul
- (United States) Nelson Akwari
- (United States) Jay Alberts
- (United States) Said Ali
- (United States) Cody Arnoux
- (Bolivia) Vicente Arze
- (Canada) Geoff Aunger *

=== B ===
- (Trinidad and Tobago) Joel John Bailey
- (Canada) Tyler Baldock
- (Canada) Ivan Belfiore*
- (Canada) Luca Bellisomo
- (Canada) Nico Berg *
- (Jamaica) Gary Brooks
- (Bermuda) Tyrell Burgess
- (Venezuela) Anthony Blondell

=== C ===
- (England) Tony Caig
- (Canada) Kevan Cameron
- (Canada) Adrian Cann
- (Canada) John Catliff *
- (Canada) Rick Celebrini *
- (Saint Vincent and the Grenadines) Wesley Charles
- (Canada) Gordon Chin
- (Switzerland) Davide Chiumiento
- (Canada) Chris Clarke
- (Canada) Ian Clarke
- (Canada) Jeff Clarke
- (Canada) Carlo Corazzin *
- (Canada) La'Vere Corbin-Ong †
- (Canada) Chris Craveiro
- (Canada) Jason Craveiro
- (Canada) Nico Craveiro
- (Canada) Tino Cucca

=== D ===
- (Canada) Paul Dailly
- (Canada) Nick Dasovic
- (Ghana) Fuseini Dauda
- (Canada) Philippe Davies
- (Brazil) William de Silva
- (Canada) Srdjan Djekanovic
- (United States) Tony Donatelli
- (Canada) Terry Dunfield
- (Canada) Alphonso Davies

=== E ===
- (Canada) Jim Easton Jr. *
- (Canada) Randy Edwini-Bonsu
- (Canada) David Elligott
- (Canada) Alex Elliott
- (Fiji) Ivor Evans *

=== F ===
- (Portugal) António Fonseca
- (Liberia) Willis Forko
- (Canada) Chris Franks
- (Canada) Michael Franks
- (Canada) Steven Frazao
- (United States) Ian Fuller
- (Canada) Douglas Muirhead

=== G ===
- (Canada) Ethan Gage
- (Canada) Charles Gbeke
- (Canada) Nick Gilbert *
- (United States) Joey Gjertsen
- (Trinidad and Tobago) Richard Goddard
- (Canada) Mark Gomes
- (United States) Andrew Gregor
- (Jamaica) Winston Griffiths
- (Scotland) Ryan Gauld

=== H ===
- (Canada) Marcus Haber
- (Puerto Rico) Josh Hansen
- (Canada) Kevin Harmse
- (Canada) Ollie Heald
- (Japan) Takashi Hirano
- (Canada) Lars Hirschfeld *
- (Canada) Kevin Holness *
- (France) Eric Hassli

=== I ===
- (Canada) Greg Ion*
- (Canada) Justin Isidro

=== J ===
- (Saint Vincent and the Grenadines) Marlon James
- (United States) Greg Janicki
- (Palestine) Omar Jarun
- (United States) Martin Johnston
- (United States) John Jones
- (Canada) Jason Jordan

=== K ===
- (Canada) Diaz Kambere
- (Tanzania) Nizar Khalfan
- (Canada) Steve Kindel
- (Canada) Tiarnan King
- (United States) Steve Klein
- (United States) Wes Knight
- (Ghana) Gershon Koffie

=== L ===
- (Canada) Bob Lenarduzzi *
- (Canada) Stefan Leslie
- (Canada) Jamie Lowery *
- (Canada) Shaun Lowther *
- (Canada) Geordie Lyall

=== M ===
- (Canada) Steve Macdonald*
- (Canada) Alen Marcina
- (Canada) Nigel Marples
- (United States) Alexander Marques-Delgado
- (United States) Lyle Martin
- (Iran) Navid Mashinchi
- (Canada) Sita-Taty Matondo
- (Haiti) Josue Mayard
- (Costa Rica) Jonathan McDonald
- (Canada) Doug McKinty *
- (United States) Jason McLaughlin
- (Canada) Dale Mitchell *
- (Canada) Domenic Mobilio *
- (Democratic Republic of the Congo) Ridge Mobulu
- (United States) Jared Montz *
- (United States) Justin Moose
- (Cameroon) Alexandre Morfaw
- (United States) David Morris
- (Canada) Doug Muirhead *
- (Canada) Scott Munson *
- (Germany) Thomas Müller *

=== N ===
- (Canada) Martin Nash
- (United States) Matthew Nelson
- (United States) Jay Nolly
- (Trinidad and Tobago) Anthony Noreiga
- (Canada) David Norman *

=== O ===
- (Canada) Norm Odinga *
- (Canada) Giuliano Oliviero *
- (Canada) Pat Onstad *
- (Nigeria) Michael Onwatuegwu †
- (Jamaica) Dever Orgill

=== P ===
- (United States) Jeff Parke
- (Wales) Shaun Pejic
- (Germany) Lutz Pfannenstiel
- (United States) Jeremie Piette
- (Canada) Kyle Porter
- (Canada) Simon Postma
- (Canada) Chris Pozniak

=== R ===
- (Canada) Marco Reda
- (Portugal) Mario Jorge Ramos-Aveleira
- (England) Craig Robson

=== S ===
- (United States) Jake Sagare
- (Bosnia and Herzegovina) Admir Salihovic
- (Canada) Randy Samuel*
- (Mexico) Ricardo Sánchez
- (Cuba) Eduardo Sebrango
- (Canada) Alex Semenets
- (Liberia) Musa Shannon
- (Canada) Jeff Skinner
- (Canada) Graham Smith
- (Northern Ireland) Jonny Steele
- (Saint Vincent and the Grenadines) Cornelius Stewart
- (United States) Ryan Suarez
- (Canada) John Sulentic

=== T ===
- (United States) Narcisse Tchoumi-Tchandja
- (Canada) Russell Teibert †
- (United States) David Testo
- (Canada) Simon Thomas †
- (Canada) Justin Thompson
- (Canada) Niall Thompson *
- (Canada) Guido Titotto*
- (Trinidad and Tobago) Rick Titus *
- (Liberia) Ansu Toure
- (Mauritania) Doudou Touré
- (Canada) Mason Trafford
- (United States) Ryan Trout
- (Georgia (country)) Zourab Tsiskaridze

=== V ===
- (Canada) Alfredo Valente
- (Canada) Carl Valentine *
- (Canada) Andrew Veer
- (Haiti) Kénold Versailles

=== W ===
- (United States) Blake Wagner
- (Canada) Mark Watson
- (United States) Mason Webb
- (United States) Nick Webb
- (United States) Josh Wicks
- (Canada) Chris Williams
- (United States) Corey Woolfolk

=== X ===
- (Canada) Davide Xausa

=== Y ===
- (Canada) Gregor Young*

=== Z ===
- (Brazil) Zé Roberto

== See also ==
- List of Vancouver Whitecaps FC players—equivalent list for this team's Major League Soccer successor

== Sources ==
- "USL-1 Team History". uslsoccer.com. United Soccer Leagues. Archived from the original on 2013-02-05.
