= 2007 Vancouver Whitecaps FC season =

Vancouver Whitecaps FC 2007 soccer season

Vancouver Whitecaps FC
2007 season
- Chairman: Greg Kerfoot
- Head coach: Bob Lilley
- Stadium: Swangard Stadium
- USL First Division: 7th
- USL-1 Playoffs: Quarter-finals
- Voyageurs Cup: 2nd
- Highest home attendance: 5,539; July 14 vs MI
- Lowest home attendance: 4,561; Aug 25 vs CH
- Average home league attendance: 5,135
Home colours	Away colours

The 2007 Vancouver Whitecaps FC season was the club's 22nd year of existence (or 32nd if counting the NASL Whitecaps), as well as their 15th as a Division 2 club in the franchise model of US-based soccer leagues. After their championship 2006 season despite a number of lingering injuries, the Whitecaps started well and led the league going undefeated until late May. However, with the sudden departure to England of starting goalkeeper Tony Caig and unexpected early season loss of Serge Djekanovic to MLS, the Whitecaps had goalkeeping instability as they gave significant minutes to four goalkeepers in 2007. Combined with injuries, the club never recovered from the challenging schedule due to 2007 FIFA U-20 venue conflicts, the team finished 7th in the USL-1, set a club record twelve game streak without a win, subsequently executed a blockbuster four player trade of 2006 USL MVP Joey Gjertsen, and midfielder David Testo for role players Ze Roberto and Surrey, BC native Alen Marcina, and set a club record for number of draws with twelve. A run of games at home to end the season in seventh place (in the playoffs due to a 2007 format change) and the resolution of injuries left the Whitecaps competitive in the second season of the playoffs. They lost a close playoff series to rival Portland Timbers with a 1–0 home leg getting overturned in a much closer than the score indicated 3–0 second leg loss (in which right back Geordie Lyall suffered a broken leg) to finish their disappointing season. Coach Bob Lilley was released at the end of the playoffs before the LA Galaxy friendly.

Local rivals Seattle (2005 Champion) and Portland both had strong seasons with Seattle capturing league and playoff titles. The schedule was not balanced; it was home and away versus each side with additional matches against Seattle, Portland, Minnesota, and expansion side San Francisco based California Victory. Average attendance increased again and remained above 5,000. Three double-headers were played with the Whitecaps Women, the USL W-League. The season's results for both the men's and women's teams may have been disappointing compared to the club's historical competitive norm, but off the field the club was strengthening its foundations.

== 2007 club growth ==
A number of factors raised the profile of the Whitecaps beginning in 2007. First after reaching the semi-final stage a number of times, the Whitecaps USL-1 championship in 2006, the first since the CSL four-peat in the early 1990s, gave the club a higher profile. Second Canada hosting the 2007 FIFA U-20 World Cup was significant for building media credibility and soccer infrastructure across the country with stadiums built in Toronto (National Soccer Stadium), approved in Montreal (Saputo Stadium opened in 2008), and partially approved in Vancouver (Whitecaps Waterfront Stadium approved by City of Vancouver pending resolution of Port of Metro Vancouver land transfer). Third the start of play and off-field success of Toronto FC encouraged speculation that Vancouver would pursue a Division 1 MLS franchise. Fourth one of the two local rivals of the Whitecaps, the Seattle Sounders, over the course of 2007 had more and more credible rumors of being announced as a 2009 MLS expansion side; this was announced November 13, 2007. Fifth David Beckham signed for the Los Angeles Galaxy giving soccer significant and sustained North American media attention as well as national legitimacy. Sixth helped by connections to the LA Galaxy coaching staff, there was ongoing speculation in the local newspapers about a LA Galaxy-Whitecaps friendly almost from when the David Beckham signing was announced. On April 17 Whitecaps announced the friendly against David Beckham and the LA Galaxy for October 3 at 60,000 seat BC Place Stadium. Despite marketing impacts from an August injury, he played, and it was a 0–0 draw played in front of 48,172 spectators. Seventh the Whitecaps started a club for local business leaders to advise and advocate for the team called Kickstarters.

The 2007 FIFA U-20 World Cup impacted the Whitecaps' season with a six-game road trip from June 22 to July 7 kicked off a lull in form where the team went 1-7-5 (W-D-L) and didn't recover until a six-game home stand beginning in mid August. However, as well as media exposure, the U-20 World Cup also spurred $300,000 upgrades to Swangard Stadium including 1,500 individual seats with backs and 36 VIP seats replacing a section of the grandstand's bleachers, better stadium lighting, and better access and egress within the stadium. The upgrades in seating and access/egress reduced Swangard Stadium's capacity from 5,722 to 5,288.

== Schedule and results ==
=== Tables ===
Commissioner's Cup, quarterfinal round of playoffs
Quarterfinal round of playoffs

Pos	Club	Pts	Pld	W	L	T	GF	GA	GD
1	Seattle Sounders	54	28	16	6	6	37	23	+14
2	Portland Timbers	51	28	14	5	9	32	18	+14
3	Montreal Impact	50	28	14	6	8	32	21	+11
4	Atlanta Silverbacks	43	28	12	9	7	40	30	+10
5	Rochester Raging Rhinos	42	28	12	10	6	39	36	+3
6	Puerto Rico Islanders	40	28	10	8	10	35	34	+1
7	Vancouver Whitecaps	39	28	9	7	12	27	24	+3
8	Carolina RailHawks	32	28	8	12	8	24	34	−10
9	Miami FC	31	28	9	15	4	31	41	−10
10	Charleston Battery	30	28	8	14	6	32	39	−7
11	Minnesota Thunder	26	28	5	12	11	32	35	−3
12	California Victory	19	28	4	17	7	17	43	−26

Overall								Home						Away					
Pld	Pts	W	L	T	GF	GA	GD	W	L	T	GF	GA	GD	W	L	T	GF	GA	GD
28	39	9	7	12	27	24	+3	5	3	6	15	13	+2	4	4	6	12	11	+1

Last updated: April 26, 2010
Source: uslsoccer.com
Pld = Matches played; Pts = Points; W = Matches won; T = Matches tied; L = Matches lost; GF = Goals for; GA = Goals against; GD = Goal difference

=== Exhibition ===
Win Draw Loss

The preseason schedule was announced March 14, 2007 along with a four-week training camp at Simon Fraser University.

March 27, 2007	Vancouver Whitecaps FC	7–1	Fraser Valley Soccer League (FVSL) All-Stars	Surrey, British Columbia
19:00 PST	Sita-Taty Matondo 2'; Martin Johnston; Adam Day; Eduardo Sebrango; Alfredo Valente	Report	Drew Jertin 30'	Stadium: Newton Athletic Park; Attendance: 500

March 31, 2007	Vancouver Whitecaps FC	2–1	University of Washington	Ladner, British Columbia
14:00 PST		Report	Raphael Cox	Stadium: Holly Park; Attendance: 0

April 1, 2007	University of British Columbia	1–1	Vancouver Whitecaps FC	Vancouver, British Columbia
15:00 PST		Report	Joel John Bailey	Stadium: Thunderbird Stadium

April 5, 2007	Trinity Western University	0–3	Vancouver Whitecaps FC	Langley, British Columbia
19:00 PST		Report	Eduardo Sebrango 10', 43', 64'	Stadium: Spartans Sports Complex

April 9, 2007	UVic Vikes	1–0	Vancouver Whitecaps FC	Victoria, British Columbia
15:00 PST	Cole McFarlane 32'	Report		Stadium: Centennial Stadium,

April 12, 2007	VMSL All-Stars	0–2	Vancouver Whitecaps FC	Coquitlam, British Columbia
19:30 PST			Martin Nash 56'; Jason McLaughlin 90'	Stadium: Percy Perry Stadium; Attendance: 400

April 15, 2007 Preseason Cup	Portland Timbers	0 – 0 (5 – 4 p)	Vancouver Whitecaps	Milwaukie, Oregon United States
16:00 (PDT)		Report		Stadium: Alder Creek Middle School; Attendance: 200
	Penalties
	Gregor (penalty scored); Bagley (penalty scored); Griffin (penalty scored); Kreamalmeyer (penalty missed); Harrington (penalty scored); Morrison (penalty scored)		(penalty scored) Gjertsen; (penalty missed) Cann; (penalty scored) McLaughlin; (penalty scored) Montz; (penalty scored) Smith; (penalty missed) Johnston

November 7, 2007	Vancouver Whitecaps FC	0–0	LA Galaxy	Vancouver, British Columbia
	Eduardo Sebrango (penalty missed) 60'	Report		Stadium: BC Place; Attendance: 48,172

=== USL-1 ===
==== Results by round ====
Round	1	2	3	4	5	6	7	8	9	10	11	12	13	14	15	16	17	18	19	20	21	22	23	24	25	26	27	28
Ground	H	H	A	A	A	A	H	H	A	A	H	A	A	A	A	A	A	H	A	H	H	A	H	H	H	H	A	A
Result	W	D	D	W	W	W	W	L	D	L	W	W	D	D	D	L	L	L	L	D	D	D	D	L	W	W	D	D

Source: uslsoccer.com
A = Away; H = Home; W = Win; D = Draw; L = Loss

April 21, 2007 1	Vancouver Whitecaps FC	1–0	Seattle Sounders	Burnaby, BC
22:00 ET	Eduardo Sebrango 55'	Report		Stadium: Swangard Stadium; Attendance: 4,948; Referee: Dominic Scali

April 28, 2007 2	Vancouver Whitecaps FC	2–2	California Victory	Burnaby, BC
22:00 ET	Eduardo Sebrango 3'; Martin Nash 69'	Report	Mike Munoz 41'; Josh Hansen 69'	Stadium: Swangard Stadium; Attendance: 4,931; Referee: Carol Anne Chenard

May 4, 2007 3	Rochester Rhinos	1–1	Vancouver Whitecaps FC	Rochester, New York
20:00 ET	Scott Palguta 51'	Report	Joey Gjertsen 9'	Stadium: Marina Auto Stadium; Attendance: 9,107; Referee: Lee Suckle

May 6, 2007 4	Minnesota Thunder	1–2	Vancouver Whitecaps FC	Saint Paul, Minnesota
22:00 ET	Freddy Juarez 66'	Report	James Alberts 50'; Steve Klein 88'	Stadium: James Griffin Stadium; Attendance: 3,641; Referee: Hidajet Tica

May 12, 2007 5	Seattle Sounders	1–3	Vancouver Whitecaps FC	Seattle
22:05 ET	Hugo Alcaraz-Cuellar 48' (pen.)	Report	Eduardo Sebrango 37'; David Testo 50'; Tony Donatelli 87'	Stadium: Qwest Field; Attendance: 2,577; Referee: Ramón Hernández

May 19, 2007 6	California Victory	1–3	Vancouver Whitecaps FC	San Francisco
22:00 ET	Josh Hansen 13'	Report	Eduardo Sebrango 6', 10'; Adrian Cann 69'	Stadium: Kezar Stadium; Attendance: 1,067; Referee: Dion Telting

May 20, 2007 7	Vancouver Whitecaps FC	3–1	Rochester Rhinos	Burnaby, BC
22:00 ET	Joey Gjertsen 39'; James Alberts 70'; Eduardo Sebrango 82'	Report	Johnny Menyongar 67' (pen.)	Stadium: Swangard Stadium; Attendance: 5,073; Referee: Mathieu Bourdeau

May 25, 2007 8	Vancouver Whitecaps FC	0–1	Carolina RailHawks	Burnaby, BC
22:00 ET		Report	Connally Edozien 57'	Stadium: Swangard Stadium; Attendance: 5,117; Referee: Drew Fischer

June 1, 2007 9 VC	Montreal Impact	0–0	Vancouver Whitecaps FC	Montreal
20:00 ET		Report		Stadium: Claude Robillard Sports Complex; Attendance: 12,103; Referee: Domenic Scali

June 7, 2007 10	California Victory	1–0	Vancouver Whitecaps FC	San Francisco
22:00 ET	Yuri Morales 16'	Report		Stadium: Kezar Stadium; Attendance: 563; Referee: Colin Arblaster

June 10, 2007 11	Vancouver Whitecaps FC	1–0	Minnesota Thunder	Burnaby, BC
22:00 ET	Tony Donatelli 74'	Report		Stadium: Swangard Stadium; Attendance: 5,420; Referee: Jonathan Lavergne

June 22, 2007 12	Miami FC Blues	1–0	Vancouver Whitecaps FC	Miami
20:00 ET		Report	Eduardo Sebrango 87'	Stadium: Tropical Park Stadium; Attendance: 1,353; Referee: Sandra Serafini

June 24, 2007 13	Puerto Rico Islanders	0–0	Vancouver Whitecaps FC	Bayamón, Puerto Rico
17:00 ET		Report		Stadium: Juan Ramón Loubriel Stadium; Attendance: 3,211; Referee: Shane Moody

June 30, 2007 14	Charleston Battery	1–1	Vancouver Whitecaps FC	Charleston, South Carolina
19:30 ET	Joey Gjertsen 36'	Report	Stephen Armstrong 56'	Stadium: Blackbaud Stadium; Attendance: 3,151; Referee: Rizal Milliken

July 3, 2007 15	Carolina RailHawks	0–0	Vancouver Whitecaps FC	Cary, North Carolina
20:00 ET		Report		Stadium: SAS Stadium; Attendance: 5,189; Referee: Jeff Gontarek

July 7, 2007 16	Atlanta Silverbacks	2–0	Vancouver Whitecaps FC	Atlanta
19:55 ET	Warren Ukah 20', 83'	Report		Stadium: Atlanta Silverbacks Park; Attendance: 2,462; Referee: Richard Sanchez

July 12, 2007 17	Seattle Sounders	1–0	Vancouver Whitecaps FC	Seattle
22:00 ET	Sebastian Le Toux 24'	Report		Stadium: Qwest Field; Attendance: 2,263; Referee: Colin Arblaster

July 14, 2007 18	Vancouver Whitecaps FC	1–2	Miami FC Blues	Burnaby, BC
22:00 ET	Jason Jordan 3'	Report	Zinho 53'; Sean Fraser 65'	Stadium: Swangard Stadium; Attendance: 5,539; Referee: Carol Anne Chounard

July 19, 2007 19	Portland Timbers	2- 1	Vancouver Whitecaps FC	Portland, Oregon
22:00 ET	Andrew Gregor 29'; Lawrence Olum 52'	Report	Martin Nash 18'	Stadium: PGE Park; Attendance: 7,123; Referee: Colin Arblaster

July 27, 2007 20	Vancouver Whitecaps FC	2–2	Seattle Sounders	Burnaby, BC
23:00 ET	Tony Donatelli 41' (pen.); Alen Marcina 85'	Report	Roger Levesque 16'; Greg Howes 90'	Stadium: Swangard Stadium; Attendance: 5,288; Referee: Mathieu Bourdeau

August 2, 2007 21	Vancouver Whitecaps FC	1–1	Puerto Rico Islanders	Burnaby, BC
22:00 ET	Alfredo Valente 77'	Report	Fabrice Noel 64'	Stadium: Swangard Stadium; Attendance: 5,352; Referee: Dave Gantar

August 11, 2007 22	Portland Timbers	0–0	Vancouver Whitecaps FC	Portland, Oregon
22:00 ET		Report		Stadium: PGE Park; Attendance: 8,652; Referee: Ian Anderson

August 12, 2007 23	Vancouver Whitecaps FC	1–1	Minnesota Thunder	Burnaby, BC
22:00 ET	Alfredo Valente 8'	Report	Own goal 45'	Stadium: Swangard Stadium; Attendance: 5,017; Referee: Jonathan Lavergne

August 18, 2007 24 VC	Vancouver Whitecaps FC	0–2	Montreal Impact	Burnaby, BC
19:00 ET		Report	Patrick Leduc 45'; Matthew Palleschi 90'	Stadium: Swangard Stadium; Attendance: 5,145; Referee: David Gantar

August 25, 2007 25	Vancouver Whitecaps FC	1–0	Charleston Battery	Burnaby, BC
22:00 ET	Jeff Clarke 69'	Report		Stadium: Swangard Stadium; Attendance: 4,561; Referee: Drew Fischer

August 30, 2007 26	Vancouver Whitecaps FC	1–0	Minnesota Thunder	Burnaby, BC
22:00 ET	Martin Nash 16'	Report		Stadium: Swangard Stadium; Attendance: 5,137; Referee: Carole Ann Chenard

September 7, 2007 27	Vancouver Whitecaps FC	1–1	Atlanta Silverbacks	Burnaby, BC
22:00 ET	Tony Donatelli 81'	Report	Tony Mcmanus 88'	Stadium: Swangard Stadium; Attendance: 5,347; Referee: Mathieu Bourdeau

September 9, 2007 28	Vancouver Whitecaps FC	0–0	Portland Timbers	Burnaby, BC
19:00 ET		Report		Stadium: Swangard Stadium; Attendance: 5,389; Referee: Silvio Petrescu

==== Post-season ====
September 14, 2007 Quarter-Final Leg 1	Vancouver Whitecaps FC	1–0	Portland Timbers	Burnaby, BC
22:00 ET	Jason Jordan 76'	Report		Stadium: Swangard Stadium; Attendance: 4,761; Referee: Dave Gantar

September 16, 2007 Quarter-Final Leg 2	Portland Timbers	3–0	Vancouver Whitecaps FC	Portland, Oregon
20::00 ET	Justin Thompson 27'; Andrew Gregor 70'; Jaime Ambriz 82'	Report		Stadium: PGE Park; Attendance: 8,522; Referee: Jair Marrufo

=== Voyageurs Cup ===
==== Voyageur Cup standings ====
Prior to 2008, from when it has been awarded to the Canadian Championship winners, the men's title was decided on regular-season matches between Canada's USL First Division sides.

Pos	Team	Pld	W	D	L	GF	GA	GD	Pts
1	Montreal Impact	2	1	1	0	2	0	+2	4
2	Vancouver Whitecaps FC	2	0	1	1	0	2	−2	1

=== Cascadia Cup ===
2007 Standings
Team	Pld	W	L	D	GF	GA	GD	Pts
Seattle Sounders	4	2	0	2	7	4	+3	8
Vancouver Whitecaps	4	0	1	3	2	3	−1	3
Portland Timbers	4	0	1	3	2	4	−2	3

Source: "Cascadia Cup". cascadiacup.soccer. January 2007.

== Staff ==
Bob Lenarduzzi succeeded John Rocha in the off season as president. John Rocha stepped down in August 2006 to focus on the 2007 FIFA U-20 World Cup as Vancouver site chairman while continuing to support the Whitecaps in a consulting role.

=== Soccer operations ===
- Manager soccer operations – Greg Anderson
- Team operations – Lindsay Puchlik
- Men's head coach – Bob Lilley
- Men's assistant coach – Todd Wawrousek
- Reserve team men's head coach –
- Women's head coach – Bob Birarda
- Reserve team women's head coach
- Communication manager – Nathan Vanstone
- Marketing – Kim Jackman

=== Business operations ===
- Office manager – Lindsay Puchlik
- Director sponsorship services – Steve Lewarne
- Accounting – Wynford Owen

=== Youth program ===
- Director youth operations – Dan Lenarduzzi
- Super Y teams manager – Nanci Robertson
- Coaching staff technical director and boys' director – Tony Fonseca
- Girls' head coach – Steve Simonson
- Head coach development – Jesse Symons
- Director goalkeeping – Michael Toshack
- Manager community soccer programs – Joe Martin

=== Event management ===
- Director event operations – Rachel Lewis
- Operations/game day manager – Hillary Campbell

== Roster ==
It was a low-scoring year with many players used over the 28 game schedule. Only three players logged 2000 minutes or more; Tony Donatelli led the Whitecaps with 27 appearances. Eduardo Sebrango led the Whitecaps with seven goals and was in a six-way tie for seventh among the USL-1 goal scorers while Martin Nash was tied for third in the USL-1 with six assists in the league.

=== Player movement ===
Centre back Ryan Suarez retired due family commitments; in 2006 he was a late season addition to a defense that allowed no goals in playoffs.

Victoria, BC native and eight year Whitecaps right back Geordie Lyall signed a contract with League 2 side Walsall F.C. in December 2006. He wasn't playing with Walsall FC towards the end of their season however and by mid May was being pursued by the Whitecaps.

Defender Lyle Martin from California was announced on March 26.

Due to injury recovery to forwards Joey Gjertsen and Jason Jordan, the Whitecaps signed forward Joel Baily as insurance on March 29. Baily had been a strike partner of Eduardo Sebrango's previously in Montreal under coach Lilley.

The Whitecaps traded Sita-Taty Matondo back to Montreal Impact for Jason McLaughlin just as preseason was concluding.

With the transition in the back line given the losses of Ryan Suarez and Geordie Lyall plus early season injuries to Steve Klein, the Whitecaps also brought in centre back Narcisse Tchoumi-Tchandja on April 12, 2007.

The signing of two local players defender Nigel Marples of North Delta and Surrey goalkeeper Tyler Baldock was announced April 24.

Goalkeeper Srdjan Djekanović was signed April 27 by Division 1 side Toronto FC after a one-week trial to back up Greg Sutton. The Whitecaps signed former Toronto Lynx goalkeeper Richard Goddard to the new backup goalkeeper position on April 27.

As of the end of the season.

=== Goalkeeper stats ===
No.	Nat.	Player	Total					USL-1					Playoffs				
No.	Nat.	Player	MIN	SV	GA	GAA	SO	MIN	SV	GA	GAA	SO	MIN	SV	GA	GAA	SO
1	(England)	Tony Caig	990	32	9	0.818	3	990	32	9	0.818	3					
1	(United States)	Matthew Nelson	450	14	4	0.80	3	270	7	1	0.333	2	180	7	3	1.50	1
29	(Trinidad and Tobago)	Richard Goddard	968	26	10	0.929	4	968	26	10	0.929	4					
29	(Germany)	Lutz Pfannenstiel	292	5	4	0.1.232	1	292	5	4	1.232	1					

Updated to match played October 20, 2013

=== Player statistics ===
No.	Pos.	Name	Apps	Minutes	Goals	Assists	Shots	Fouls	Yellow card	Red card			
No.	Pos.	Name	1	GK	(England) Tony Caig	11	990	0	0	0	0	0	0
1	GK	(United States) Matthew Nelson	5	450	0	0	0	0	0	0			
2	DF	(Canada) Jeff Clarke	26	2249	1	0	12	27	6	0			
2	MF	(United States) Steve Klein	24(2)	2209	1	1	4	9	1	1			
4	DF	(Canada) Adrian Cann	26(1)	742	0	0	1	14	2	0			
6	MF	(United States) James Alberts	8(13)	802	2	1	12	10	1	0			
7	MF	(Canada) Martin Nash	26(1)	2179	3	6	23	36	3	0			
8	DF	(Canada) Steve Kindel	23(1)	2035	0	3	13	24	4	0			
9	MF	(Canada) Alfredo Valente	15(11)	1246	2	2	27	33	5	0			
11	FW	(Canada) Alen Marcina	5(2)	408	1	1	5	4	1	0			
11	MF	(United States) David Testo	13(3)	1012	1	1	10	32	0	0			
12	FW	(Cuba) Eduardo Sebrango	13(5)	1139	7	1	32	16	1	0			
13	MF	(Canada) Geordie Lyall	11(4)	961	0	1	7	13	1	0			
14	MF	(United States) Tony Donatelli	24(5)	2111	4	2	47	29	2	0			
15	MF	(United States) Jason McLaughlin	5(16)	595	0	1	13	22	2	0			
16	DF	(Cameroon) Narcisse Tchoumi-Tchandja	6(3)	470	0	0	1	17	2	0			
17	MF	(Brazil) Ze Roberto	8	659	0	0	8	10	1	0			
17	MF	(United States) Joey Gjertsen	15(4)	1365	3	1	36	11	1	0			
18	DF	(Canada) Graham Smith	0(4)	85	0	0	0	0	0	0			
18	MF	(United States) Josh Hansen	8(1)	519	0	0	8	10	1	0			
19	FW	(United States) Martin Johnston	0(2)	13	0	0	0	0	0	0			
20	DF	(Canada) David Morris	7(13)	664	0	0	7	16	1	0			
22	DF	(Canada) Nigel Marples	1(1)	74	0	0	0	0	0				
23	FW	(Trinidad and Tobago) Joel John Bailey	6(8)	603	0	1	11	24	1	0			
24	DF	(United States) Lyle Martin	19(5)	1567	0	0	6	18	2	0			
25	MF	(United States) Sola Abolaji	(1)	29	0	0	0	0	0	0			
26	FW	(Canada) Jason Jordan	5(7)	390	2	1	10	5	1	0			
27	MF	(Canada) Stefan Leslie	1(5)	106	0	0	3	0	0				
28	DF	(Canada) Diaz Kambere	10(6)	933	0	0	3	9	4	0			
29	GK	(Trinidad and Tobago) Richard Goddard	11	968	0	0	0	0	0	0			
29	GK	(Germany) Lutz Pfannenstiel	3(1)	292	0	0	0	0	0	0			
—	–	Opponent Own goals	–	–	1	–	–	–	–	–			

Updated February 28, 2014
- Note this list includes only players that have dressed in the eighteen.
- Note brackets indicate substitute appearances.
- Note statistics are for league and playoffs (not preseason).
