= 2006 Voyageurs Cup =

2006 Coupe des Voyageurs (in French)

Tournament details
- Country: Canada
- Teams: 3

Final positions
- Champions: Montreal Impact (5th title)
- Runners-up: Toronto Lynx

Tournament statistics
- Matches played: 6
- Goals scored: 10 (1.67 per match)
- Attendance: 38,717 (6,453 per match)
- Top goal scorer(s): Sita-Taty Matondo; Jamie Dodds (2 goals each)

The 2006 Voyageurs Cup was the fifth edition of the Voyageurs Cup tournament started by the Canadian supporters group The Voyageurs. The 2006 Edition of the tournament featured Montreal Impact, Toronto Lynx and Vancouver Whitecaps.

The 2006 Voyageurs Cup was won by Montreal Impact won by a single point in the table over the second place Toronto Lynx, clinching the competition in the final all-Canadian match of the 2006 USL season in a scoreless draw against the Linx on September 8, 2006. All three sides recorded a single win in the competition, however only Montreal was able to go undefeated against the other Canadian sides recording a win and three draws totaling six points in the table.

== Format ==
Each team played two matches (home and away) against each other team. All of these matches were drawn from the USL First Division 2006 regular season. The 2006 USL First Division was not a balanced home and away competition where each team played the others an equal number of times; only the final two matches played between each city's team is counted as a Voyageurs Cup 2006 match. In each match, 3 points were awarded for wins (even had it come in extra time), 1 point was awarded for a draw, and 0 points were awarded for losses (even had it come in extra time). The four teams were ranked according to the total number of points obtained in all matches.

The team ranked highest after all matches have been played was to be crowned the champion, and would be awarded the Voyageurs Cup.

== Standings ==
| Pos | Team | Pld | W | D | L | GF | GA | GD | Pts | MTL | TOR | VAN |
|---|---|---|---|---|---|---|---|---|---|---|---|---|
| 1 | Montreal Impact | 4 | 1 | 3 | 0 | 3 | 2 | +1 | 6 | — | 0–0 | 1–1 |
| 2 | Toronto Lynx | 4 | 1 | 2 | 1 | 3 | 4 | −1 | 5 | 1–1 | — | 2–1 |
| 3 | Vancouver Whitecaps FC | 4 | 1 | 1 | 2 | 4 | 4 | 0 | 4 | 0–1 | 2–0 | — |

=== Results by round ===
A = Away; H = Home; W = Win; D = Draw; L = Loss

Montreal Impact
| Round | 1 | 2 | 3 | 4 |
|---|---|---|---|---|
| Ground | H | A | A | H |
| Result | D | W | D | D |

Source: Voyageurs.ca

Toronto Lynx
| Round | 1 | 2 | 3 | 4 |
|---|---|---|---|---|
| Ground | A | H | H | A |
| Result | L | W | D | D |

Source: Voyageurs.ca

Vancouver Whitecaps
| Round | 1 | 2 | 3 | 4 |
|---|---|---|---|---|
| Ground | H | A | A | H |
| Result | W | L | D | L |

Source: Voyageurs.ca

== Schedule ==
April 29, 2006
22:00 ET

| Vancouver Whitecaps FC | 2–0 | Toronto Lynx |
|---|---|---|
| Joey Gjertsen 45'; Sita-Taty Matondo 82' | Report |

Swangard Stadium, Burnaby, BC
Attendance: 4,555
Referee: David Gantar

July 5, 2006
12:00 ET

| Toronto Lynx | 2–1 | Vancouver Whitecaps FC |
|---|---|---|
| Jamie Dodds 20'; Damien Pottinger 31' | Report | Sita-Taty Matondo 29' |

Centennial Park Stadium, Etobicoke, ON
Attendance: 2,235
Referee: Rob Antle

July 7, 2006
20:00 ET

| Montreal Impact | 1–1 | Vancouver Whitecaps FC |
|---|---|---|
| Mauricio Vincello 90' | Report | Steve Kindel 21' |

Complexe sportif Claude-Robillard, Montreal, QC
Attendance: 12,435
Referee: Domenic Scali

July 16, 2006
22:00 ET

| Vancouver Whitecaps FC | 0–1 | Montreal Impact |
|---|---|---|
| | Report | Joel John Bailey 55' |

Swangard Stadium, Burnaby, BC
Attendance: 5,417
Referee: David Gantar

August 23, 2006
19:30 ET

| Toronto Lynx | 1–1 | Montreal Impact |
|---|---|---|
| Jamie Dodds 48' | Report; Report; Report | Zé Roberto 70' |

Centennial Park Stadium, Etobicoke, ON
Attendance: 1,184
Referee: Mauricio Navarro

September 8, 2006
19:30 ET

| Montreal Impact | 0–0 | Toronto Lynx |
|---|---|---|
| | Report; Report; Report |

Complexe sportif Claude-Robillard, Montreal, QC
Attendance: 12,891

=== Champion ===
Voyageurs Cup:
Montreal Impact
5th Voyageurs Cup Win

== Top scorers ==
| Rank | Player | Club | Goals |
|---|---|---|---|
| 1 | (Canada) Sita-Taty Matondo | Vancouver Whitecaps | 2 |
| 1 | (Canada) Jamie Dodds | Toronto Lynx | 2 |
| 3 | (United States) Joey Gjertsen | Vancouver Whitecaps | 1 |
| 3 | (Canada) Damien Pottinger | Toronto Lynx | 1 |
| 3 | (Canada) Steve Kindel | Vancouver Whitecaps | 1 |
| 3 | (Argentina) Mauricio Vincello | Montreal Impact | 1 |
| 3 | (Trinidad and Tobago) Joel John Bailey | Montreal Impact | 1 |
| 3 | (Brazil) Zé Roberto | Montreal Impact | 1 |
