= Seattle Sounders–Vancouver Whitecaps rivalry =

Soccer rivalry

- Other names: Cascadia Cup
- Location: Pacific Northwest
- Teams: Seattle Sounders FC; Vancouver Whitecaps FC
- First meeting: June 9, 1974; NASL; Vancouver 0–2 Seattle
- Latest meeting: November 1, 2026; Major League Soccer; Vancouver 5–1 Seattle
- Next meeting: TBD

Statistics
- Total meetings: 190
- Most wins: Seattle (74, official)
- All-time series: Seattle: 74; Ties: 40; Vancouver: 52
- Largest victory: 5–0 (4 games)
- Longest win streak: 7 matches Vancouver Whitecaps (May 16, 1981 – June 20, 1983)
- Longest unbeaten streak: 15 matches Seattle Sounders (August 23, 2017 – September 17, 2022)

The Seattle Sounders–Vancouver Whitecaps rivalry is a soccer rivalry between Seattle Sounders FC and Vancouver Whitecaps FC, both based in the Pacific Northwest region. The rivalry originated in the North American Soccer League of the 1970s, with both cities reviving expansion teams, and has carried into lower-level leagues, including the A-League and USL First Division. The rivalry moved to Major League Soccer, the top division of soccer in the United States and Canada, in 2011. The two clubs are part of the Cascadia Cup, the trophy and competition created in 2004 by supporters of the Portland Timbers, Vancouver Whitecaps, and the Seattle Sounders which is awarded each season to the best top-flight soccer team in the Cascadia region.

Seattle and Vancouver have had rivalries based on various sports teams. Of the five major sports leagues in North America, the two cities each have franchises in the National Hockey League with the Canucks and the Kraken, which joined in 2021. They also had a series between the SuperSonics and Grizzlies of the NBA, before the eventual relocation of both franchises.

== History ==
=== Overall stats ===
As of November 1, 2026

Competition	Matches	Wins		Ties
Competition	Matches	Seattle	Vancouver	Ties
NASL (1974–1983)	25	7	16	2
NASL indoor (1981–1982)	4	3	1	0
WSA (1988)	1	0	0	1
A-League/USL-1 (1994–2008)	73	36	19	18
MLS (2011–present); MLS is Back Tournament (2020)	42	18	13	11
League totals (regular season)	145	64	49	32
NASL playoffs	4	4	0	0
A-League/USL-1 playoffs	11	2	3	6
MLS playoffs	2	1	0	1
League totals (playoffs)	17	7	3	7
CONCACAF Champions League/Cup	4	3	0	1
International totals (tournaments)	4	3	0	1
Competitive totals	166	74	52	40
Friendlies (all formats)	24	7	11	6
All-time totals	190	81	63	46

=== NASL era ===
Both Pacific Northwest cities joined the North American Soccer League, the top-flight of the American and Canadian soccer systems, in 1974. The clubs were founded on the same date—December 11, 1973—and predated their fellow Cascadian rival Portland by one year. Future Sounders manager Brian Schmetzer played for the NASL incarnation of the franchise and was part of the Washington–British Columbia junior soccer exchange program that sent Seattle athletes to the Vancouver area to play their teams and stay with Canadian families.

The strong cultural and trade links between the two cities in the new soccer rivalry, including the experience of Alan Hinton, who was a player-coach for the Whitecaps in two different stints before becoming a Seattle resident in 1979 and Sounders broadcaster. Hinton recalled the NASL crowds and significant presence of rival fans at away games: "It's a great rivalry...Years ago they'd come down in their thousands. There was no television in those days, so you'd get as much as three or four thousand Vancouver fans." This tradition has manifested itself in the modern-day fan culture and a similar situation can also be seen in Major League Baseball, as Canadian fans flock to Seattle and dominate the stands at T-Mobile Park during Toronto Blue Jays visits to face the Seattle Mariners. As a result, animosity can prevail at the stadiums where "Everyone hates it here when it happens. Everybody is mad at the Canadians."

Ultimately, the series ended after the 1983 North American Soccer League season as the league lost financial stability and would soon collapse. In the final season of competition between the clubs, the Whitecaps defeated Seattle 2 to 1 before 60,342 fans in Empire Stadium, the largest crowd to watch a match between the two in series history. Ultimately, Vancouver led the NASL series 16–11–2 but Seattle took all four postseason matchups.

==== NASL indoor ====
The NASL staged full indoor seasons on four occasions, but the Sounders and Whitecaps only met in this format during the 1981–82 season. As members of the Northwest Division in the Pacific Conference, the clubs faced one another four times during the campaign. On December 8, 1981 in front of 2,785 the Whitecaps claimed a 5-4 home victory at the PNE Agrodome. Seattle went on to take all three of the remaining matches and the season series.

=== WSA/CPSL era ===
After the Sounders folded in late 1983, F.C. Seattle was formed in 1984 with a roster that boasted several NASL veterans. They hosted the F.C. Seattle Challenge '84 as a series of friendlies against pro competition including the Whitecaps, which would ultimately contribute to the formation of the Western Soccer Alliance. Over the next several years the Seattle club would face the Whitecaps and then their successor, the Vancouver 86ers of the Canadian Professional Soccer League, eight times. Seven of these meetings were club friendlies. However the 1988 encounter counted in the WSA standings for Seattle, as the 86ers and another CPSL club (Calgary) played every team in the WSA even though their own CPSL season had not yet begun. The match was decided, 4-1, on penalty kicks, after a 1-1 draw including extra time.

=== USL era ===
The cities' professional soccer teams reunited in the A-League in 1994. During this period, the Cascadia Cup was founded by the supporters groups of the teams, in conjunction with those of the Portland Timbers. The A-League ultimately became the USL First Division, which the clubs competed in until the Sounders made the jump to the first-division Major League Soccer in 2009. .

=== MLS era ===
Two seasons after the Sounders joined MLS, Vancouver joined them as an expansion franchise in 2011. The first match featured an early lead for the Whitecaps but the Sounders scored two goals from Mauro Rosales and Osvaldo Alonso after the 81st minute. Ultimately, Eric Hassli erased the deficit with one of the greatest goals in MLS history to end the inaugural MLS match in a draw. Several years later, Kekuta Manneh became the youngest player in MLS history to score a hat-trick with three goals in a 4–1 victory in Seattle. The rivalry's intensity was felt on the pitch several times in the 2010s, punctuated by Brad Evans headbutting David Edgar in a 2016 match.

In 2015, the clubs squared off in the CONCACAF Champions League group stage, their first meeting in a continental tournament. The Sounders routed the Whitecaps in the second leg to win 3–0 on aggregate and advanced to the quarterfinals. Two years later, the clubs met in the domestic postseason for the first time. The first leg of the conference semifinals was particularly contentious, as teams nearly brawled while security guards ejected leaders of the Emerald City Supporters group for brandishing antifascist signs. After the scoreless draw at BC Place, the Sounders took the second leg 2–0 from second-half goals from Clint Dempsey to send the club to a second straight Western Conference Championship game.

Fredy Montero, one of the Sounders' first stars and all-time leading goal scorer, moved across the border to Vancouver in 2017. During his first season in Vancouver, the former Sounder said, "the supporters took some time to adopt me as one of their own — and I respected that. They knew my history in Seattle, and I knew that I had to earn their love." Montero went on to win the team's Golden Boot award in his first season in Vancouver, highlighted by a brace in his first meeting against his former mates, and then scoring a shorthanded equalizer in the midseason rematch. After three seasons with the Whitecaps, Montero returned to Seattle on a one-year deal with an option for 2023.

==== MLS honors ====
As of October 1, 2025

Seattle	Competition	Vancouver
Domestic
2	MLS Cup	—
1	Supporters' Shield	—
4	U.S. Open Cup / Canadian Championship	5
7	Aggregate	5
Continental and Worldwide
1	CONCACAF Champions League	—
—	Leagues Cup	—
—	Campeones Cup	—
1	Aggregate	0
8	Total aggregate	5

== Cups ==
Between 2004 and 2008, the USL Seattle Sounders, Vancouver Whitecaps, and Portland Timbers competed for the supporter created Cascadia Cup, to be awarded to the club who finished with the best record in each season series between the three teams. The Cascadia Cup was created to celebrate the strong rivalries between each of the three clubs. Seattle won the Cascadia Cup twice in this five-year period while Portland never won. Seattle was not involved in the 2009 or 2010 competitions, both of which were won by Portland. While both Seattle and Portland consider Vancouver to be a rival, both of the U.S. fanbases consider their rivalries with Vancouver more cordial than with one another. In a 2011 story on the rivalry by Sports Illustrated writer Grant Wahl, one Timbers Army member said about Vancouver fans, "It's hard to dislike them because they're so nice", and an Emerald City Supporters member added, "They're like the nice cousin that's never going to offend anyone at a party." The MLS versions of the Whitecaps, Sounders and Timbers resumed contesting the Cascadia Cup, beginning with the 2011 season.

== Results ==
For statistical purposes, matches that went to shootouts are counted as draws. Matches ending with a shootout are denoted with an '*'.

=== NASL era ===
Season	Date	Competition	Stadium	Home team	Result	Away team	Attendance	Series	Ref
1974	June 9	NASL	Empire Stadium	Vancouver Whitecaps	0–2	Seattle Sounders	11,258	SEA 1–0–0	
1974	August 11	NASL	Kingdome	Seattle Sounders	2–1	Vancouver Whitecaps	14,876	SEA 2–0–0	
1975	April 26	NASL	Empire Stadium	Vancouver Whitecaps	2–1	Seattle Sounders	7,753	SEA 2–1–0	
1975	July 10	NASL	Empire Stadium	Vancouver Whitecaps	2–1	Seattle Sounders	7,205	Tied 2–2–0	
1975	July 19	NASL	Memorial Stadium	Seattle Sounders	3–0	Vancouver Whitecaps	17,925	SEA 3–2–0	
1976	May 2	NASL	Kingdome	Seattle Sounders	1–0	Vancouver Whitecaps	24,096	SEA 4–2–0	
1976	August 13	NASL	Empire Stadium	Vancouver Whitecaps	3–2	Seattle Sounders	10,533	SEA 4–3–0	
1976	August 18	NASL playoffs	Kingdome	Seattle Sounders	1–0	Vancouver Whitecaps	30,406	SEA 5–3–0	
1977	July 5	NASL	Empire Stadium	Vancouver Whitecaps	1–0	Seattle Sounders	14,559	SEA 5–4–0	
1977	July 15	NASL	Kingdome	Seattle Sounders	3–1	Vancouver Whitecaps	25,023	SEA 6–4–0	
1977	August 10	NASL playoffs	Empire Stadium	Vancouver Whitecaps	0–2	Seattle Sounders	21,915	SEA 7–4–0	
1978	April 9	NASL	Empire Stadium	Vancouver Whitecaps	3–0	Seattle Sounders	11,232	SEA 7–5–0	
1978	May 10	NASL	Memorial Stadium	Seattle Sounders	1–2	Vancouver Whitecaps	17,085	SEA 7–6–0	
1979	July 7	NASL	Empire Stadium	Vancouver Whitecaps	3–1	Seattle Sounders	20,041	Tied 7–7–0	
1979	August 11	NASL	Kingdome	Seattle Sounders	1–2	Vancouver Whitecaps	24,196	VAN 8–7–0	
1980	April 12	NASL	Empire Stadium	Vancouver Whitecaps	0–0*	Seattle Sounders	27,602	VAN 8–7–1	
1980	August 2	NASL	Kingdome	Seattle Sounders	1–0	Vancouver Whitecaps	33,363	Tied 8–8–1	
1980	August 27	NASL playoffs	Empire Stadium	Vancouver Whitecaps	1–2	Seattle Sounders	27,231	SEA 9–8–1	
1980	August 30	NASL playoffs	Kingdome	Seattle Sounders	3–1	Vancouver Whitecaps	35,254	SEA 10–8–1	
1981	May 2	NASL	Empire Stadium	Vancouver Whitecaps	2–3	Seattle Sounders	25,577	SEA 11–8–1	
1981	May 16	NASL	Kingdome	Seattle Sounders	1–3	Vancouver Whitecaps	31,325	SEA 11–9–1	
1981	August 12	NASL	Empire Stadium	Vancouver Whitecaps	5–0	Seattle Sounders	26,427	SEA 11–10–1	
1982	May 2	NASL	Empire Stadium	Vancouver Whitecaps	2–1	Seattle Sounders	20,253	Tied 11–11–1	
1982	June 12	NASL	Kingdome	Seattle Sounders	1–2	Vancouver Whitecaps	17,410	VAN 12–11–1	
1982	August 18	NASL	Kingdome	Seattle Sounders	1–2	Vancouver Whitecaps	29,488	VAN 13–11–1	
1983	May 7	NASL	Kingdome	Seattle Sounders	0–1	Vancouver Whitecaps	13,039	VAN 14–11–1	
1983	June 20	NASL	BC Place	Vancouver Whitecaps	2–1	Seattle Sounders	60,342	VAN 15–11–1	
1983	August 13	NASL	Kingdome	Seattle Sounders	2–2*	Vancouver Whitecaps	13,343	VAN 15–11–2	
1983	August 28	NASL	BC Place	Vancouver Whitecaps	3–2	Seattle Sounders	27,326	VAN 16–11–2	

=== NASL indoor ===
Season	Date	Competition	Stadium	Home team	Result	Away team	Attendance	Series	Ref
1981–82	December 8	NASL indoor	PNE Agrodome	Vancouver Whitecaps	5–4	Seattle Sounders	2,785	VAN 1–0–0	
1981–82	December 18	NASL indoor	Kingdome	Seattle Sounders	6–3	Vancouver Whitecaps	5,158	Tied 1–1–0	
1981–82	January 29	NASL indoor	PNE Agrodome	Vancouver Whitecaps	2–3	Seattle Sounders	3,604	SEA 2–1–0	
1981–82	February 8	NASL indoor	Kingdome	Seattle Sounders	6–4	Vancouver Whitecaps	5,014	SEA 3–1–0	

=== WSA/CPSL era ===
Season	Date	Competition	Stadium	Home team	Result	Away team	Attendance	Series	Ref
1988	May 22	WSA	Memorial Stadium	F.C. Seattle Storm	0–0*	Vancouver 86ers		Tied 0–0–1	

=== A-League/USL era ===
Cascadia Cup Match‡

Season	Date	Competition	Stadium	Home team	Result	Away team	Attendance	Series	Ref
1994		APSL	Swangard Stadium	Vancouver 86ers	1–1*	Seattle Sounders	4,921	Tied 0–0–1	
1994		APSL	Tacoma Dome	Seattle Sounders	5–0	Vancouver 86ers	6,458	SEA 1–0–1	
1994		APSL	Swangard Stadium	Vancouver 86ers	2–3	Seattle Sounders	4,814	SEA 2–0–1	
1994		APSL	Swangard Stadium	Vancouver 86ers	1–4	Seattle Sounders	4,769	SEA 3–0–1	
1994	September 24	APSL	Memorial Stadium	Seattle Sounders	3–0	Vancouver 86ers	11,847	SEA 4–0–1	
1995	May 12	A-League	Swangard Stadium	Vancouver 86ers	1–2	Seattle Sounders	4,021	SEA 5–0–1	
1995	May 20	A-League	Memorial Stadium	Seattle Sounders	3–1	Vancouver 86ers	4,225	SEA 6–0–1	
1995	July 23	A-League	Swangard Stadium	Vancouver 86ers	2–2*	Seattle Sounders	5,055	SEA 6–0–2	
1995	August 19	A-League	Memorial Stadium	Seattle Sounders	2–3	Vancouver 86ers	7,634	SEA 6–1–2	
1995	September 5	A-League	Swangard Stadium	Vancouver 86ers	1–2	Seattle Sounders	4,823	SEA 7–1–2	
1995	September 9	A-League	Memorial Stadium	Seattle Sounders	3–1	Vancouver 86ers	7,239	SEA 8–1–2	
1995	September 15	A-League playoffs	Swangard Stadium	Vancouver 86ers	1–0	Seattle Sounders	4,036	SEA 9–1–2	
1995	September 17	A-League playoffs	Memorial Stadium	Seattle Sounders	0–0*	Vancouver 86ers	4,339	SEA 9–1–3	
1996	April 27	A-League	Memorial Stadium	Vancouver 86ers	2–1	Seattle Sounders	4,500	SEA 10–1–3	
1996	May 25	A-League	Rotary Stadium	Vancouver 86ers	0–2	Seattle Sounders	2,634	SEA 11–1–3	
1996	July 14	A-League	Rotary Stadium	Vancouver 86ers	2–2*	Seattle Sounders	4,185	SEA 11–1–4	
1996	July 27	A-League	Memorial Stadium	Seattle Sounders	0–1	Vancouver 86ers		SEA 11–2–4	
1996	August 24	A-League	Memorial Stadium	Seattle Sounders	2–2*	Vancouver 86ers		SEA 11–2–5	
1996	August 30	A-League	Rotary Stadium	Vancouver 86ers	1–4	Seattle Sounders	3,748	SEA 12–2–5	
1997	April 12	A-League	Memorial Stadium	Seattle Sounders	0–1	Vancouver 86ers	4,561	SEA 12–3–5	
1997	April 18	A-League	Rotary Stadium	Vancouver 86ers	0–1	Seattle Sounders	4,119	SEA 13–3–5	
1997	June 14	A-League	Memorial Stadium	Seattle Sounders	2–1	Vancouver 86ers	2,186	SEA 14–3–5	
1997	June 25	A-League	Rotary Stadium	Vancouver 86ers	0–1	Seattle Sounders	3,563	SEA 15–3–5	
1997	August 29	A-League	Rotary Stadium	Vancouver 86ers	2–1	Seattle Sounders	4,650	SEA 15–4–5	
1997	September 12	A-League playoffs	Swangard Stadium	Vancouver 86ers	3–0	Seattle Sounders	3,607	SEA 15–5–5	
1997	September 14	A-League playoffs	Memorial Stadium	Seattle Sounders	0–0*	Vancouver 86ers	4,820	SEA 15–5–6	
1997	September 14	A-League playoffs	Memorial Stadium	Seattle Sounders	1–1*	Vancouver 86ers	4,820	SEA 15–5–7	
1998	April 24	A-League	Swangard Stadium	Vancouver 86ers	2–1	Seattle Sounders	6,039	SEA 15–6–7	
1998	May 2	A-League	Memorial Stadium	Seattle Sounders	0–1	Vancouver 86ers	4,162	SEA 15–7–7	
1998	July 11	A-League	Memorial Stadium	Seattle Sounders	4–0	Vancouver 86ers	2,773	SEA 16–7–7	
1998	August 8	A-League	Memorial Stadium	Seattle Sounders	2–0	Vancouver 86ers	3,168	SEA 17–7–7	
1998	September 7	A-League	Swangard Stadium	Vancouver 86ers	1–2	Seattle Sounders	5,094	SEA 18–7–7	
1999	May 1	A-League	Swangard Stadium	Vancouver 86ers	1–2	Seattle Sounders	5,144	SEA 19–7–7	
1999	May 8	A-League	Renton Memorial Stadium	Seattle Sounders	2–1	Vancouver 86ers	3,778	SEA 20–7–7	
1999	June 3	A-League	Swangard Stadium	Vancouver 86ers	1–1*	Seattle Sounders	2,760	SEA 20–7–8	
1999	June 5	A-League	Renton Memorial Stadium	Seattle Sounders	0–2	Vancouver 86ers	1,576	SEA 20–8–8	
1999	September 4	A-League	Renton Memorial Stadium	Seattle Sounders	1–1*	Vancouver 86ers	3,105	SEA 20–8–9	
1999	September 6	A-League	Swangard Stadium	Vancouver 86ers	1–0	Seattle Sounders	5,605	SEA 20–9–9	
2000	May 6	A-League	Swangard Stadium	Vancouver 86ers	2–4	Seattle Sounders	4,202	SEA 21–9–9	
2000	May 7	A-League	Memorial Stadium	Seattle Sounders	0–0*	Vancouver 86ers	3,563	SEA 21–9–10	
2000	June 18	A-League	Memorial Stadium	Seattle Sounders	3–0	Vancouver 86ers	1,906	SEA 22–9–10	
2000	July 21	A-League	Swangard Stadium	Vancouver 86ers	3–0	Seattle Sounders	4,510	SEA 22–10–10	
2000	July 22	A-League	Memorial Stadium	Seattle Sounders	2–1	Vancouver 86ers	1,334	SEA 23–10–10	
2000	July 30	A-League	Swangard Stadium	Vancouver 86ers	3–4	Seattle Sounders	4,125	SEA 24–10–10	
2000	September 4	A-League	Swangard Stadium	Vancouver 86ers	5–0	Seattle Sounders	4,875	SEA 24–11–10	
2001	May 5	A-League	Memorial Stadium	Seattle Sounders	0–1	Vancouver Whitecaps	3,227	SEA 24–12–10	
2001	June 24	A-League	Swangard Stadium	Vancouver Whitecaps	1–5	Seattle Sounders	5,796	SEA 25–12–10	
2001	September 7	A-League	Swangard Stadium	Vancouver Whitecaps	2–1	Seattle Sounders	7,199	SEA 25–13–10	
2001	September 8	A-League	Memorial Stadium	Seattle Sounders	5–0	Vancouver Whitecaps	3,665	SEA 26–13–10	
2002	May 18	A-League	Memorial Stadium	Seattle Sounders	1–0	Vancouver Whitecaps	2,274	SEA 27–13–10	
2002	May 19	A-League	Swangard Stadium	Vancouver Whitecaps	1–2	Seattle Sounders	3,171	SEA 28–13–10	
2002	May 26	A-League	Swangard Stadium	Vancouver Whitecaps	1–4	Seattle Sounders	3,872	SEA 29–13–10	
2002	July 28	A-League	Seahawks Stadium	Seattle Sounders	4–1	Vancouver Whitecaps	25,515	SEA 30–13–10	
2002	September 13	A-League playoffs	Swangard Stadium	Vancouver Whitecaps	2–0	Seattle Sounders	5,686	SEA 30–14–10	
2002	September 15	A-League playoffs	Memorial Stadium	Seattle Sounders	2–6	Vancouver Whitecaps	3,917	SEA 30–15–10	
2003	May 23	A-League	Swangard Stadium	Vancouver Whitecaps	2–2	Seattle Sounders		SEA 30–15–11	
2003	May 25	A-League	Seahawks Stadium	Seattle Sounders	0–0	Vancouver Whitecaps	2,643	SEA 30–15–12	
2003	June 7	A-League	Seahawks Stadium	Seattle Sounders	2–1	Vancouver Whitecaps	4,752	SEA 31–15–12	
2003	June 20	A-League	Swangard Stadium	Vancouver Whitecaps	1–0	Seattle Sounders	4,198	SEA 31–16–12	
2003	July 19	A-League	Seahawks Stadium	Seattle Sounders	1–1	Vancouver Whitecaps		SEA 31–16–13	
2003	July 20	A-League	Swangard Stadium	Vancouver Whitecaps	2–0	Seattle Sounders	5,316	SEA 31–17–13	
2003	September 5	A-League playoffs	Seahawks Stadium	Seattle Sounders	0–0	Vancouver Whitecaps	2,178	SEA 31–17–14	
2003	September 7	A-League playoffs	Swangard Stadium	Vancouver Whitecaps	1–1*	Seattle Sounders	5,175	SEA 31–17–15	
2004	July 9‡	A-League	Swangard Stadium	Vancouver Whitecaps	1–0	Seattle Sounders	4,577	SEA 31–18–15	
2004	July 10‡	A-League	Seahawks Stadium	Seattle Sounders	0–0	Vancouver Whitecaps	2,759	SEA 31–18–16	
2004	August 15‡	A-League	Swangard Stadium	Vancouver Whitecaps	0–1	Seattle Sounders	5,722	SEA 32–18–16	
2004	August 18‡	A-League	Seahawks Stadium	Seattle Sounders	2–1	Vancouver Whitecaps	2,896	SEA 33–18–16	
2004	September 10	A-League playoffs	Seahawks Stadium	Seattle Sounders	1–0	Vancouver Whitecaps	2,496	SEA 34–18–16	
2004	September 12	A-League playoffs	Swangard Stadium	Vancouver Whitecaps	1–1	Seattle Sounders	5,286	SEA 34–18–17	
2005	May 7‡	USL	Qwest Field	Seattle Sounders	0–0	Vancouver Whitecaps	2,495	SEA 34–18–18	
2005	June 25‡	USL	Qwest Field	Seattle Sounders	1–1	Vancouver Whitecaps	2,696	SEA 34–18–19	
2005	June 26‡	USL	Swangard Stadium	Vancouver Whitecaps	0–0	Seattle Sounders	5,722	SEA 34–18–20	
2005	July 29‡	USL	Swangard Stadium	Vancouver Whitecaps	0–0	Seattle Sounders	5,434	SEA 34–18–21	
2006	May 26‡	USL	Swangard Stadium	Vancouver Whitecaps	2–2	Seattle Sounders	4,658	SEA 34–18–22	
2006	May 27‡	USL	Qwest Field	Seattle Sounders	1–0	Vancouver Whitecaps	2,998	SEA 35–18–22	
2006	August 19‡	USL	Qwest Field	Seattle Sounders	2–0	Vancouver Whitecaps	3,584	SEA 36–18–22	
2006	September 8‡	USL	Swangard Stadium	Vancouver Whitecaps	3–2	Seattle Sounders	5,347	SEA 36–19–22	
2007	April 21	USL	Swangard Stadium	Vancouver Whitecaps	1–0	Seattle Sounders	4,948	SEA 36–20–22	
2007	May 12	USL	Qwest Field	Seattle Sounders	1–3	Vancouver Whitecaps	2,577	SEA 36–21–22	
2007	July 12‡	USL	Qwest Field	Seattle Sounders	1–0	Vancouver Whitecaps	2,263	SEA 37–21–22	
2007	July 27‡	USL	Swangard Stadium	Vancouver Whitecaps	2–2	Seattle Sounders	5,288	SEA 37–21–23	
2008	May 23‡	USL	Swangard Stadium	Vancouver Whitecaps	0–2	Seattle Sounders	5,146	SEA 38–21–23	
2008	August 20‡	USL	Starfire Sports Complex	Seattle Sounders	0–0	Vancouver Whitecaps	3,203	SEA 38–21–24	
2008	September 20‡	USL	Starfire Sports Complex	Seattle Sounders	2–3	Vancouver Whitecaps	4,401	SEA 38–22–24	

=== MLS era ===
Cascadia Cup match‡

Season	Date	Competition	Stadium	Home team	Result	Away team	Attendance	Series	Ref
2011	June 11‡	MLS	CenturyLink Field	Seattle Sounders FC	2–2	Vancouver Whitecaps FC	36,502	Tied 0–0–1	
2011	September 24‡	MLS	Empire Field	Vancouver Whitecaps FC	1–3	Seattle Sounders FC	21,000	SEA 1–0–1	
2012	May 19‡	MLS	BC Place	Vancouver Whitecaps FC	2–2	Seattle Sounders FC	21,000	SEA 1–0–2	
2012	August 18‡	MLS	CenturyLink Field	Seattle Sounders FC	2–0	Vancouver Whitecaps FC	55,718	SEA 2–0–2	
2012	September 29‡	MLS	BC Place	Vancouver Whitecaps FC	0–0	Seattle Sounders FC	21,000	SEA 2–0–3	
2013	June 8‡	MLS	CenturyLink Field	Seattle Sounders FC	3–2	Vancouver Whitecaps FC	53,679	SEA 3–0–3	
2013	July 6‡	MLS	BC Place	Vancouver Whitecaps FC	2–0	Seattle Sounders FC	22,500	SEA 3–1–3	
2013	October 9‡	MLS	CenturyLink Field	Seattle Sounders FC	1–4	Vancouver Whitecaps FC	38,833	SEA 3–2–3	
2014	May 24‡	MLS	BC Place	Vancouver Whitecaps FC	2–2	Seattle Sounders FC	21,000	SEA 3–2–4	
2014	July 5‡	MLS	BC Place	Vancouver Whitecaps FC	1–0	Seattle Sounders FC	22,500	Tied 3–3–4	
2014	October 10‡	MLS	CenturyLink Field	Seattle Sounders FC	0–1	Vancouver Whitecaps FC	55,765	VAN 4–3–4	
2015	May 16‡	MLS	BC Place	Vancouver Whitecaps FC	0–2	Seattle Sounders FC	21,000	Tied 4–4–4	
2015	August 1‡	MLS	CenturyLink Field	Seattle Sounders FC	0–3	Vancouver Whitecaps FC	53,125	VAN 5–4–4	
2015	August 5	Champions League	BC Place	Vancouver Whitecaps FC	1–1	Seattle Sounders FC	19,683	VAN 5–4–5	
2015	September 19‡	MLS	BC Place	Vancouver Whitecaps FC	0–3	Seattle Sounders FC	21,000	Tied 5–5–5	
2015	September 23	Champions League	CenturyLink Field	Seattle Sounders FC	3–0	Vancouver Whitecaps FC	37,624	SEA 6–5–5	
2016	March 19‡	MLS	CenturyLink Field	Seattle Sounders FC	1–2	Vancouver Whitecaps FC	40,012	Tied 6–6–5	
2016	September 17‡	MLS	CenturyLink Field	Seattle Sounders FC	1–0	Vancouver Whitecaps FC	47,111	SEA 7–6–5	
2016	October 2‡	MLS	BC Place	Vancouver Whitecaps FC	1–2	Seattle Sounders FC	24,837	SEA 8–6–5	
2017	April 14‡	MLS	BC Place	Vancouver Whitecaps FC	2–1	Seattle Sounders FC	22,120	SEA 8–7–5	
2017	August 23‡	MLS	BC Place	Vancouver Whitecaps FC	1–1	Seattle Sounders FC	22,120	SEA 8–7–6	
2017	September 27‡	MLS	CenturyLink Field	Seattle Sounders FC	3–0	Vancouver Whitecaps FC	41,868	SEA 9–7–6	
2017	October 29	MLS Cup playoffs	BC Place	Vancouver Whitecaps FC	0–0	Seattle Sounders FC	27,837	SEA 9–7–7	
2017	November 2	MLS Cup playoffs	CenturyLink Field	Seattle Sounders FC	2–0	Vancouver Whitecaps FC	39,587	SEA 10–7–7	
2018	July 21‡	MLS	CenturyLink Field	Seattle Sounders FC	2–0	Vancouver Whitecaps FC	41,849	SEA 11–7–7	
2018	September 15‡	MLS	BC Place	Vancouver Whitecaps FC	1–2	Seattle Sounders FC	27,863	SEA 12–7–7	
2019	March 30‡	MLS	BC Place	Vancouver Whitecaps FC	0–0	Seattle Sounders FC	24,803	SEA 12–7–8	
2019	June 29‡	MLS	CenturyLink Field	Seattle Sounders FC	1–0	Vancouver Whitecaps FC	44,489	SEA 13–7–8	
2020	July 19	MLS is Back	ESPN Sports Complex	Seattle Sounders FC	3–0	Vancouver Whitecaps FC	0	SEA 14–7–8	
2020	October 3	MLS	CenturyLink Field	Seattle Sounders FC	3–1	Vancouver Whitecaps FC	0	SEA 15–7–8	
2020	October 27	MLS	Providence Park	Vancouver Whitecaps FC	0–2	Seattle Sounders FC	0	SEA 16–7–8	
2021	June 26	MLS	Lumen Field	Seattle Sounders FC	2–2	Vancouver Whitecaps FC	25,603	SEA 16–7–9	
2021	September 15‡	MLS	Lumen Field	Seattle Sounders FC	4–1	Vancouver Whitecaps FC	31,842	SEA 17–7–9	
2021	November 7‡	MLS	BC Place	Vancouver Whitecaps FC	1–1	Seattle Sounders FC	25,117	SEA 17–7–10	
2022	June 14‡	MLS	Lumen Field	Seattle Sounders FC	4–0	Vancouver Whitecaps FC	31,165	SEA 18–7–10	
2022	September 27‡	MLS	BC Place	Vancouver Whitecaps FC	2–1	Seattle Sounders FC	19,722	SEA 18–8–10	
2023	May 20‡	MLS	BC Place	Vancouver Whitecaps FC	2–0	Seattle Sounders FC	19,108	SEA 18–9–10	
2023	July 8‡	MLS	BC Place	Vancouver Whitecaps FC	2–3	Seattle Sounders FC	16,399	SEA 19–9–10	
2023	October 7‡	MLS	Lumen Field	Seattle Sounders FC	0–0	Vancouver Whitecaps FC	33,666	SEA 19–9–11	
2024	April 20‡	MLS	Lumen Field	Seattle Sounders FC	0–2	Vancouver Whitecaps FC	30,550	SEA 19–10–11	
2024	May 18‡	MLS	Lumen Field	Seattle Sounders FC	1–1	Vancouver Whitecaps FC	30,102	SEA 19–10–12	
2024	October 2‡	MLS	BC Place	Vancouver Whitecaps FC	0–3	Seattle Sounders FC	17,362	SEA 20–10–12	
2025	June 8‡	MLS	BC Place	Vancouver Whitecaps FC	3–0	Seattle Sounders FC	24,276	SEA 20–11–12	
2025	September 27‡	MLS	Lumen Field	Seattle Sounders FC	2–2	Vancouver Whitecaps FC	32,750	SEA 20–11–13	
2026	March 12	Champions Cup	BC Place	Vancouver Whitecaps FC	0–3	Seattle Sounders FC	12,446	SEA 21–11–13	
2026	March 18	Champions Cup	One Spokane Stadium	Seattle Sounders FC	2–1	Vancouver Whitecaps FC	5,126	SEA 22–11–13	
2026	August 16‡	MLS	Lumen Field	Seattle Sounders FC	0–2	Vancouver Whitecaps FC	30,026	SEA 22–12–13	
2026	November 1‡	MLS	BC Place	Vancouver Whitecaps FC	5–1	Seattle Sounders FC	32,111	SEA 22–13–13	

=== Friendlies ===
Season	Date	Competition	Stadium	Home team	Result	Away team	Attendance	Series	Ref
1974	April 27	Preseason	Livermore Stadium, CA	Vancouver Whitecaps	2–0	Seattle Sounders	1,200	VAN 1–0–0	
1976	March 14	Preseason	Everett Memorial Stadium	Seattle Sounders	0–4	Vancouver Whitecaps	3,422	VAN 2–0–0	
1977	March 11	Preseason	Swangard Stadium	Vancouver Whitecaps	0–0*	Seattle Sounders	2,100	VAN 2–0–1	
1977	March 13	Preseason	Civic Stadium, Bellingham	Seattle Sounders	2–2*	Vancouver Whitecaps	2,275	VAN 2–0–2	
1979	March 25	Preseason	Swangard Stadium	Vancouver Whitecaps	2–2*	Seattle Sounders	4,500	VAN 2–0–3	
1982	May 22	EuroPac Cup	Empire Stadium	Vancouver Whitecaps	1–1	Seattle Sounders	12,488	VAN 2–0–4	
1983	March 26	Preseason	Civic Stadium, Portland	Seattle Sounders	2–0	Vancouver Whitecaps	2,519	VAN 2–1–4	
1983	April 8	Preseason	Joe Albi Stadium	Seattle Sounders	2–3	Vancouver Whitecaps	2,565	VAN 3–1–4	
1983	August 6	EuroPac Cup	BC Place	Vancouver Whitecaps	1–2	Seattle Sounders	26,034	VAN 3–2–4	
1984	June 10	FC Seattle Challenge ‘84	Memorial Stadium	F.C. Seattle	2–2	Vancouver Whitecaps	5,984	VAN 3–2–5	
1984	Aug 4	Club friendly	BC Place	Vancouver Whitecaps	1–2	F.C. Seattle	1,426	Tied 3–3–5	
1987	July 15	Club friendly	Memorial Stadium	F.C. Seattle	0–1	Vancouver 86ers		VAN 4–3–5	
1989	May 7	Club friendly	Memorial Stadium	Seattle Storm	2–1	Vancouver 86ers	2,710	Tied 4–4–5	
1989	Aug 27	Club friendly	Swangard Stadium	Vancouver 86ers	2–0	Seattle Storm		VAN 5–4–5	
1990	Aug 5	Club friendly	Swangard Stadium	Vancouver 86ers	5–3	Seattle Storm	3,046	VAN 6–4–5	
1990	Aug 8	Club friendly	Memorial Stadium	Seattle Storm	3–2	Vancouver 86ers	2,200	VAN 6–5–5	
2001	March 6	Canterbury Classic	Swangard Stadium	Vancouver Whitecaps	2–1	Seattle Sounders	1,251	VAN 7–5–5	
2005	April 16	Preseason	Exhibition Park, Chilliwack	Vancouver Whitecaps FC	1–0	Seattle Sounders	2,000	VAN 8–5–5	
2006	April 14	Preseason	Exhibition Park, Chilliwack	Vancouver Whitecaps FC	3–1	Seattle Sounders	2,022	VAN 9–5–5	
2008	March 22	Preseason	Starfire Sports Complex	Seattle Sounders FC	1–2	Vancouver Whitecaps FC	752	VAN 10–5–5	
2009	February 21	Preseason	Qwest Field	Seattle Sounders FC	4–0	Vancouver Whitecaps FC	0	VAN 10–6–5	
2010	February 11	Arizona training	Grande Sports World, Casa Grande	Vancouver Whitecaps FC	2–3	Seattle Sounders FC	?	VAN 10–7–5	
2010	March 6	Preseason	Swangard Stadium	Vancouver Whitecaps FC	0–0	Seattle Sounders FC	?	VAN 10–7–6	
2011	March 6	Cascadia Summit	Starfire Sports Complex	Seattle Sounders FC	2–3	Vancouver Whitecaps FC	3,100	VAN 11–7–6	

=== Western Conference standings finishes ===
Sounders Whitecaps

* indicates Cascadia Cup win

P.	2011	2012	2013	2014	2015	2016	2017	2018	2019	2020	2021	2022	2023	2024	2025	2026
1				1												1*
2	2*				2		2	2*	2*	2	2*		2		2*	
3		3					3									
4			4		4*	4								4		
5		5		5*											5	
6											6		6*			
7			7*													
8						8*		8						8		8
9	9									9		9				
10																
11												11				
12									12							
13																
14																
15																

• Total: Seattle with 12 higher finishes, Vancouver with 4.

=== Players to play for both clubs ===
- (Colombia) Fredy Montero: Seattle Sounders 2009–14, 2021–23; Vancouver Whitecaps 2017, 2019–20
- (Argentina) Mauro Rosales: Seattle Sounders 2011–13; Vancouver Whitecaps 2014–15, 2017

== See also ==
- Cascadia Cup
  - Portland Timbers–Vancouver Whitecaps rivalry
  - Seattle Sounders–Portland Timbers rivalry
- Cascadia (bioregion)
- MLS rivalry cups
