= Justin Isidro =

Canadian soccer player (born 1988)

Personal information
- Full name: Justin Alexandre Prata Isidro
- Date of birth: July 19, 1988 (age 38)
- Place of birth: Burnaby, British Columbia
- Height: 1.77 m (5 ft 9 1/2 in)
- Position: Midfielder

Team information
- Current team: Caldas Sport Clube

Youth career
- 1993–2004: Metro Ford Soccer Club
- 2004: Sporting Club Vancouver
- 2005–2008: Vitória S.C.

Senior career*
Years	Team	Apps	(Gls)
2004	Vancouver Whitecaps	3	(0)
2008–	Caldas Sport Clube	28	(9)
2011–	Vancouver Olympics		

International career
2002–2006	Canada U-16	29	(7)
2006	Canada U-17	3	(0)
- * Club domestic league appearances and goals

Justin Alexandre Prata Isidro (born July 19, 1988) is a Canadian soccer player who is currently playing for Caldas Sport Clube.

== Early life ==
Isidro was born in Burnaby, British Columbia, raised in Pitt Meadows.

== Career ==
=== Early career ===
Isidro began his football career with only five years by Metro Ford Soccer Club in Coquitlam and joined after nine years to Sporting Club Vancouver.

=== Professional career ===
He started his professional football career in the age from fifteen under Tony Fonseca, the Head Coach from Vancouver Whitecaps called the young player in January 2004 to the USL First Division team who earned his first senior caps. Only six months after his senior call-up left Vancouver Whitecaps in July 2004 and started his Europe adventure, he signed for Portuguese club Vitória S.C. He played regularly for the youth and reserve team between June 2008, in July 2008 signed a one-year contract with Caldas.

=== Position ===
He plays as a striker or attacking midfielder. Current club Vancouver Olympics FC, coached by Dino Anastopulos in Canada. Playing since DEC- 2011 till current. Same club in Canada that Daniel Fernandes former PAOK Salonika FC goalkeeper and Gianluca Zavarise former Canadian International and TORONTO FC- MLS.Vancouver Olympics FC has been a steppingstone to professionalism for many Canadian soccer players.

== International career ==
Isidro played four years for the Canadian BCSA Provincial U16 team and was later called up for a training camp of the Canada National U17 team.
