= Damien Pottinger =

Canadian soccer player (born 1982)

Personal information
- Date of birth: January 17, 1982 (age 44)
- Place of birth: Scarborough, Ontario, Canada
- Height: 5 ft 10 in (1.78 m)
- Position: Forward

Youth career
- 2000–2003: Duquesne University

Senior career*
Years	Team	Apps	(Gls)
2002	Vaughan Sun Devils	1	(1)
2004–2005	Pittsburgh Riverhounds	22	(4)
2004–2006	Philadelphia KiXX (indoor)	21	(5)
2006	St. Louis Steamers (indoor)	22	(4)
2006	Toronto Lynx	21	(5)
2007	GS United		
2007–2008	Orlando Sharks (indoor)	28	(12)
2009	Italia Shooters		
- * Club domestic league appearances and goals

Damien Pottinger (born January 17, 1982) is a Canadian former professional soccer player who played as a forward.

== Career ==
=== College career ===
Pottinger began playing at the college level with Duquesne University in 2000, where he is currently the University's all-time leading goal-scorer with 34 goals. After a successful stint with Duquesne, he was named to the Atlantic 10 Pre-Season All-Conference Team and the Most Valuable Offensive Player. His achievements were recognized in 2009 when he was inducted into the university's hall of fame.

=== Club career ===
He played in the Canadian Professional Soccer League during the college offseason with Vaughan Sun Devils, making his debut on June 21, 2002, against the Ottawa Wizards, where he registered a goal in a 3–1 victory. After the conclusion of his college career, he was selected second overall by the Edmonton Aviators in the 2004 A-League draft. Instead, he signed a contract with the Pittsburgh Riverhounds in the USL Pro Soccer League, where he appeared in eight matches and scored a goal. He returned to Pittsburgh for the 2005 season, where he appeared in 14 matches and recorded three goals.

In 2006, he was acquired by the Toronto Lynx of the USL First Division. He made his debut on June 4, 2006, against the Virginia Beach Mariners, which ended in a scoreless draw. On June 15, he recorded his first goal with Toronto against Miami FC in a 2–2 draw. In his debut season, he scored 5 goals in 21 games. He participated in the 2006 Open Canada Cup final, where Toronto was defeated by Ottawa St. Anthony Italia.

In 2009, he appeared in a semifinal match in the Canadian Soccer League with Italia Shooters against Trois-Rivières Attak, where he recorded a goal. In 2014, he played in the Ontario Soccer League with GS United, where he finished as the top goal scorer in the Provincial Elite division.

=== Indoor career ===
In the winter of 2004, he played in the Major Indoor Soccer League with the Philadelphia KiXX. In his debut season with Philadelphia, he assisted the club in securing a playoff berth. He re-signed with Philadelphia for the 2005-2006 season. Midway through 2006, he played with league rivals St. Louis Steamers. During the 2007-08 indoor season, he played with the Orlando Sharks.

== Honors ==
Pittsburgh Riverhounds SC

- USL Pro Soccer League Atlantic Division: 2004

Toronto Lynx

- Open Canada Cup runner-up: 2006
- Voyageurs Cup runner-up: 2006

GS United

- Ontario Soccer League Provincial Elite Top goal scorer: 2014
