= Corey Woolfolk =

American soccer player

Personal information
- Date of birth: February 2, 1979 (age 47)
- Place of birth: Ann Arbor, Michigan, United States
- Height: 5 ft 10 in (1.78 m)
- Position: Midfielder

College career
Years	Team	Apps	(Gls)
1997–2000	Stanford Cardinal		

Senior career*
Years	Team	Apps	(Gls)
2001	Minnesota Thunder	14	(6)
2002	Dayton Gemini		
2003	Pittsburgh Riverhounds	26	(8)
2004	Rochester Rhinos	26	(9)
2005	Puerto Rico Islanders	26	(9)
2006	Vancouver Whitecaps	1	(0)
2007	Atlanta Silverbacks	3	(0)
2008	San Francisco Seals	5	(0)

Managerial career
- 2002: University of Michigan (assistant)
- * Club domestic league appearances and goals

Corey Woolfolk (born February 2, 1979, in Ann Arbor, Michigan) is a former American soccer forward, and current founder of Pitchwise Holdings.

Woolfolk attended Pioneer High School, where he was a 1996 first team All State and NSCAA High School All American. He then attended Stanford University, where he played on the men's soccer team from 1997 to 2000. He graduated with a bachelor's degree in urban planning. On February 6, 2001, the San Jose Earthquakes drafted Woolfolk in the 5th round (49th overall in the 2001 MLS SuperDraft. He played seven preseason games, scoring four goals. The Earthquakes waived Woolfolk on May 30, 2001, to free up a roster spot for Landon Donovan.

On June 18, 2001, Woolfolk signed with the Minnesota Thunder in the USL A-League. He broke his foot in 2002 and lost most of the season, playing part of the time with the Dayton Gemini of the Premier Development League and serving as an assistant coach with the University of Michigan men's soccer team. In 2003, he played for the Pittsburgh Riverhounds then in 2004, he moved to the Rochester Rhinos. In 2005, he joined the Puerto Rico Islanders, where he was the team's second leading scorer with nine goals. On February 1, 2006, he signed with the Vancouver Whitecaps. He suffered a stress fracture in the pre-season and played only one game before with Vancouver. The team released him in December 2006. In 2007, he played three games for the Atlanta Silverbacks.

Since retirement, Woolfolk has founded Pitchwise Holdings and become a venture capital investor in Silicon Valley.
