= Jared Montz =

American soccer player (born 1982)

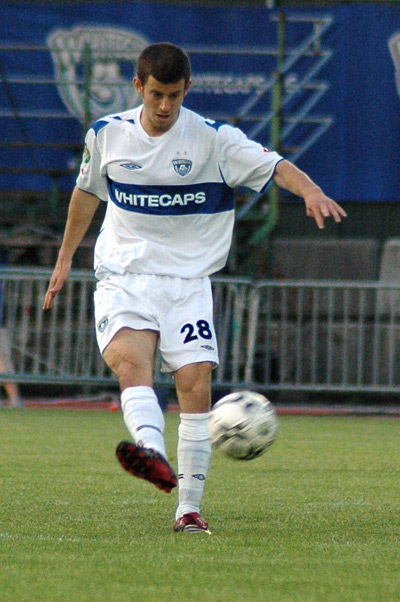

Personal information
- Date of birth: December 26, 1982 (age 43)
- Place of birth: Mandeville, Louisiana, United States
- Height: 5 ft 10 in (1.78 m)
- Position: Defender

Youth career
- 2001–2004: Lynn Fighting Knights

Senior career*
Years	Team	Apps	(Gls)
2004	New Orleans Shell Shockers	17	(2)
2005–2006	Chicago Fire	1	(0)
2007	Vancouver Whitecaps	1	(0)
2007–2009	Puerto Rico Islanders	10	(0)
Total		29	(2)
- * Club domestic league appearances and goals

Jared Montz (born December 26, 1982) is an American former professional soccer player who played as a defender.

== Career ==
Montz played college soccer at Lynn University for four years, where he finished with 5 goals and 16 assists in 67 matches. He helped lead the Lynn Fighting Knights to the 2003 NCAA Division II Men's Soccer Championship.

He signed with the Chicago Fire on April 15, 2005. In 2006, he made his debut appearance and earned an assist, but was later waived during the off-season due to injury. He subsequently signed for the Vancouver Whitecaps in the USL First Division. After making just one appearance for the Whitecaps, he transferred to the Puerto Rico Islanders in June 2007.

Montz ended his career early because of a recurring injury and announced his retirement from professional soccer on March 20, 2009.

== Honors ==
Lynn Fighting Knights

- NCAA Division II Men's Soccer Championship: 2003
