= Tino Cucca =

Canadian former soccer player

Personal information
- Full name: Umbertino Cucca
- Date of birth: February 2, 1984 (age 42)
- Place of birth: Burnaby, Canada
- Positions: Midfielder; forward

Senior career*
Years	Team	Apps	(Gls)
2004–2006	Vancouver Whitecaps	14	(1)
2007–2014	Columbus Clan F.C.		

International career
2001	Canada U17	3	(0)
- * Club domestic league appearances and goals

Tino Cucca (born February 2, 1984) is a Canadian former soccer player.

== Playing career ==
Cucca began his career in 2004 with the Vancouver Whitecaps in the USL A-League, where he appeared in a total of 14 matches and recorded 1 goal. In 2007, he signed with the Columbus Clan F.C. in the Vancouver Metro Soccer League. In his debut season they won the British Columbia Provincial Soccer Championship, and also reached the finals of the Open Canada Cup. In 2009, he won the VMSL Golden Boot Award.

== International career ==
He made his debut for the Canada men's national under-17 soccer team on April 18, 2001 against El Salvador at the 2001 CONCACAF U-17 Tournament.
