= Whitecaps Waterfront Stadium =

Soccer facility in Vancouver, Canada

Coordinates: 49°17′8″N 123°6′21″W

The Whitecaps Waterfront Stadium was a proposed open-air soccer facility in Vancouver, British Columbia, Canada that would have been privately funded and developed by the Vancouver Whitecaps FC. The proposed location was north of Gastown on the central waterfront on what was then a parking lot and the site of a helicopter landing pad. The proposed stadium would have housed the Vancouver Whitecaps FC men and women's clubs.

== Proposal ==
The $70-million stadium would have had an initial capacity of 20,000, which would be potentially expandable to 30,000 seats.

In addition to Vancouver Whitecaps FC matches, the stadium was intended host international soccer matches, rugby union matches and tournaments, tennis and beach volleyball tournaments, and open-air musical events and concerts such as the Vancouver International Jazz Festival and Vancouver Symphony Orchestra. The stadium would have had close access to many modes of public transportation, including SkyTrain, SeaBus, West Coast Express, and buses.

== Controversy ==
Although Vancouver public support for the stadium was high (a Mustel survey found that 71% of Vancouver residents supported the project), the proposal drew protests from several groups including the Gastown Neighbourhood Coalition. Local architects Arthur Erickson and Bing Thom also urged caution, saying that piecemeal development of some of Vancouver's last undeveloped waterfront should be avoided. They argued that the stadium would deny waterfront access and negatively affect the historical theme of the Gastown area. The architects urged city hall to delay approval until a comprehensive plan had been submitted. Independent architecture firm Hotson Bakker, hired by the city of Vancouver, concluded that the stadium plans as proposed were unworkable. They reported that the development did not fit with the Gastown district or consider future residential developments. They also stressed the need for a comprehensive waterfront plan.

== History ==
On July 11, 2006, Vancouver's city council gave unanimous approval to continue the planning process, provided that certain critical problems were addressed. Specific issues included the lack of roads for spectator and emergency access, and the stadium's location above railroad tracks. The project would be reviewed quarterly by city planners until the stadium's construction is approved; the developers had two years to accomplish this.

On January 22, 2007, the Whitecaps filed a new proposal shifting the proposed site for the stadium project to the current location of the SeaBus terminal, a short distance northwest of the previous site.

On February 1, 2007, Vancouver City Council unanimously endorsed a city staff report which identified a process to potentially resolve the proposed Whitecaps Waterfront Stadium's five key requirements set out by City Council. In addition, the staff report outlined a procedure to integrate the stadium with the Waterfront Hub Study.

In July 2007, the City of Vancouver noted that "The Whitecaps and the VPA are now considering an alternative siting which addresses the technical constraints facing the SeaBus terminal site. This would involve some of the VPA-owned land between the SeaBus terminal and Crab Park (see figure below) and would enable the SeaBus to remain in place. This area is anticipated for mixed use development by the Central Waterfront Port Lands Policy Statement (1994) and any proposal would need to be considered in that context." They further added "The Whitecaps and VPA are currently investigating whether this site could meet their needs and aspirations. If the Whitecaps and VPA decide to pursue the development of the stadium in this location, they will need to develop a proposal and submit it to City staff for evaluation and consultation with the public and interested parties."

Initial plans targeted completion for summer 2009, though this was pushed back many times. On March 18, 2009, Major League Soccer (MLS) announced an expansion franchise for the city to begin play in 2011. The team stated intentions to play at least the first season, and possibly up to five seasons, at BC Place Stadium.

In 2011, Bob Lenarduzzi confirmed that the team was committed to BC Place, and that plans for the Waterfront Stadium were put on hold.
