= Anthony Noreiga =

Trinidad and Tobago footballer

Anthony Noreiga is a Trinidadian footballer who was with Joe Public F.C. Noreiga joined the Trinidad and Tobago national football team for the 2007 CONCACAF Gold Cup. He attended George Mason University in Fairfax, Virginia for university where he scored 4 goals, had 2 assists, and was awarded Colonial Athletic Association's defender of the year. Prior to this he attended University of Mobile. He is from South Trinidad and is the first son of Cecile & Roy Noreiga. He has been married for more than 15 years & his 1st son's name is Antonio Allen-Noreiga, 2nd son's name is Adriano Noreiga, only daughter is Sian Noreiga & his wife is Simone Allen-Noreiga.

He was signed by the Vancouver Whitecaps on April 8, 2006 and appeared 16 times with 518 minutes while notching one goal.

He was injured in the Gold Cup Game against the United States of America in 2007. After declining an offer from Kansas City Wizards & playing with Joe Public FC he then was signed to T&Tec FC.

== Sources ==
- Anthony Noreiga – cstv.com
