= Stefan Leslie =

Canadian soccer player (born 1987)

Personal information
- Full name: Stefan Leslie
- Date of birth: October 23, 1987 (age 39)
- Place of birth: Richmond, British Columbia, Canada
- Height: 5 ft 11 in (1.80 m)
- Position: Midfielder

Team information
- Current team: Surrey United
- Number: 11

Youth career
- 2000–2005: Surrey FC Pegasus Metro
- 2005: Columbus Clan
- 2003–2005: Trinity Western Spartans

Senior career*
Years	Team	Apps	(Gls)
2006–2008	Vancouver Whitecaps	17	(0)
2008	→ Whitecaps Residency (loan)	3	(0)
2009	Abbotsford Mariners	14	(1)
2010–	Surrey United	21	(1)

International career
2002–2003	Canada U-17	2	(0)
2006–2008	Canada U-23	2	(0)

Managerial career
- 2006–: Guildford Athletic Club
- * Club domestic league appearances and goals

Stefan Leslie (born October 23, 1987) is a Canadian soccer player currently playing for Surrey United in the Vancouver Metro Soccer League.

== Career ==
=== Youth and college ===
Leslie was born in Richmond, British Columbia. Leslie attended William F. Davidson Elementary School in Surrey, British Columbia, North Surrey Secondary School, and played college soccer at Trinity Western University, having represented the Spartans in basketball, football, soccer, and track & field. In 2006, Leslie was Canada West Rookie of the Year and a Canada West Second Team All-Star. He also played amateur club soccer for Surrey FC Pegasus Metro and the Columbus Clan.

=== Professional ===
Leslie signed for the Vancouver Whitecaps of the USL First Division in 2006, subsequently playing in 17 games over two years with the team. During 2008 Leslie was loaned to the Whitecaps' development team, Vancouver Whitecaps Residency in the USL Premier Development League, helping them to the Western Conference title.

On December 10, 2008, Leslie was released from his contract with the Whitecaps. Having been unable to secure a professional contract, Leslie signed with Abbotsford Mariners of the USL Premier Development League for the 2009 season. Currently, Leslie is playing locally with the Surrey United Firefighters in the Vancouver Metro Soccer League for the winter, he is looking to make the jump back into the professional ranks in the 2010.

== International career ==
Leslie has represented Canada at U-17 and U-23 level.

== Personal life ==
Leslie's father originally hails from Barbados, while his mother comes from Trinidad and Tobago. Leslie is married to Canadian Christian singer, Amanda Leslie, who released her first album called Moments in 2024.

== Coaching career ==
During the off-season, Leslie helps former Whitecaps teammate Jeff Clarke run soccer academy programs at Guildford Athletic Club. Leslie also coaches at Surrey United SC, working with teams within the BC Soccer Premier League.
