= Geordie Lyall =

Canadian soccer player

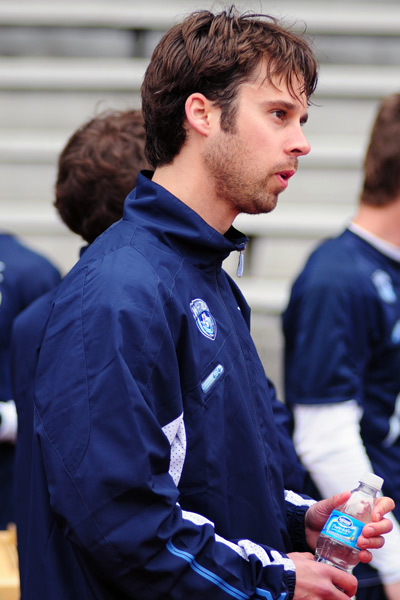

Personal information
- Date of birth: September 15, 1976 (age 50)
- Place of birth: Toronto, Ontario, Canada
- Height: 5 ft 11 in (1.80 m)
- Position: Defender

Youth career
- 1994–1998: Victoria Vikings

Senior career*
Years	Team	Apps	(Gls)
1999–2006	Vancouver Whitecaps	135	(4)
2006–2007	Walsall	0	(0)
2007–2009	Vancouver Whitecaps	26	(0)
Total		161	(4)
- * Club domestic league appearances and goals

Geordie Lyall (born September 15, 1976) is a Canadian former professional soccer player.

He spent virtually his entire career playing for Canadian club Vancouver Whitecaps, with the exception of a brief period in England with lower-league club Walsall.

== Career ==
=== College ===
Lyall played college soccer at the University of Victoria from 1994 to 1998.

=== Professional ===
Lyall began his professional career with the Vancouver Whitecaps in 1999, and spent the next seven years there, playing 135 games and helping the team to their first USL First Division championship in 2006. He spent a brief spell in England with Walsall, although he never actually made a first team appearance for the Saddlers.

He re-signed with the Whitecaps in June 2007. On 12 October 2008 he helped the Whitecaps capture their second USL First Division Championship beating the Puerto Rico Islanders 2-1 in Vancouver On January 20, 2009 the Whitecaps announced the contract extensions of Lyall for the 2009 season; he subsequently played 7 games (253 minutes) in his final season with the Whitecaps.

Lyall retired from playing professional soccer on October 30, 2009, stating that he will be continuing his career as an educator.

=== International ===
Lyall has represented Canada at international futsal.

== Personal ==
Lyall is the older brother of Matthew Lyall, lead singer of Canadian indie rock band The Racoons.
