= Steve Kindel =

Canadian soccer player (born 1977)

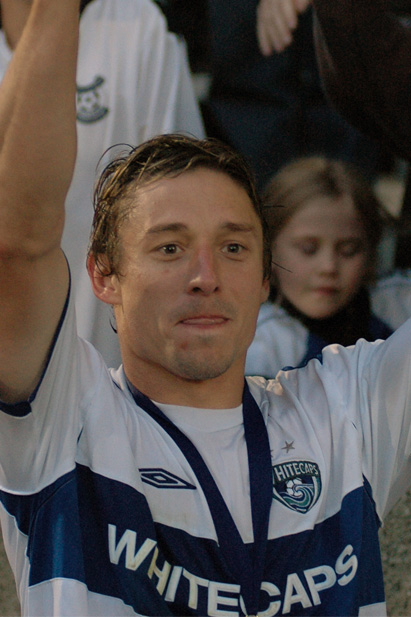

Personal information
- Date of birth: February 25, 1977 (age 49)
- Place of birth: Burnaby, British Columbia, Canada
- Height: 5 ft 9 in (1.75 m)
- Position: Left back

College career
Years	Team	Apps	(Gls)
1995–1997	Simon Fraser Clan		

Senior career*
Years	Team	Apps	(Gls)
1997–1998	Vancouver 86ers	34	(4)
1998–1999	Mons	26	(5)
1999	Richmond Kickers	5	(0)
2000	Hampton Roads Mariners	1	(0)
2000–2008	Vancouver Whitecaps	211	(27)
2009–2010	Rochester Rhinos	11	(0)
2010	Surrey United Firefighters	10	(1)

International career
1996–1997	Canada U-20	9	(4)
1998–2000	Canada U-23	10	(0)
1998–1999	Canada	4	(0)

Managerial career
- 2004–2007: Surrey United Women
- * Club domestic league appearances and goals

Steve Kindel (born February 25, 1977) is a Canadian former soccer player.

== Club career ==
Kindel was a former standout at Simon Fraser University, where he won the 1997 NAIA Pacific Northwest Conference Player of the Year. He turned pro by signing with the Vancouver Whitecaps in 1997 where he would play until 1998. After USL soccer he left for Europe where he had a brief stint with R.A.E.C. Mons of the Belgian Third Division A. The same year he made his debut with the Canada national soccer team, where in total he would earn 4 caps.

Kindel returned to the USL First Division first playing with the Richmond Kickers in 1999, then with the Hampton Roads Mariners in 2000. Midway through the season Kindel returned to Vancouver and re-signed with the club at the USL First Division roster freeze on August 1, 2000. In 2001 and 2002 he finished second in scoring and was named into the Second Team All A-League. the same two seasons he won the Vancouver Gerry Nakatsuka Midfielder of the Year award.

During the 2005 season he was converted into a left back by Bob Lilley. Where he logged 2, 381 minutes only second to Martin Nash. He was also awarded the first ever Jack MacDonald Unsung Hero award. In 2006, he helped the Whitecaps claim their first USL First Division Championship by beating the Rochester Rhinos 2–0. On 12 October 2008 he helped the Whitecaps capture their second USL First Division Championship beating the Puerto Rico Islanders 2–1 in Vancouver He was released on 8 December 2008 by Vancouver Whitecaps. On July 23, 2009 the Rochester Rhinos announced the signing of Kindel a one-year deal. After his releasing by Rochester Rhinos in the USL First Division, he signed with Surrey United Firefighters.

== International career ==
Kindel played at the 1997 FIFA World Youth Championship in Malaysia, alongside Paul Stalteri and Jason Bent. He won 10 caps with the Canadian U-23 team.

He made his senior debut for Canada in a May 1998 friendly match against Macedonia and earned a total of 4 caps, scoring no goals. His final international was a July 1999 friendly match against Saudi Arabia.

== Coaching career ==
Kindel was the long time Technical Director of Vancouver United Football Club and its predecessor Dunbar Soccer Association before accepting a Technical Director position at North Vancouver Football Club in the summer of 2012 to present. Both are two of the biggest clubs in western Canada. He also coached the Surrey United Women's Premier team to six consecutive BC Provincial Cup titles and multiple Canadian Club National metals including Gold in 2006. Kindel also has experience coaching various boys elite teams in the Vancouver area. He currently holds a Canadian B National Certificate.

== Personal life ==
Kindel is of Italian descent.

He married Sara Maglio. Their son, Ben Kindel, was born in 2007. Their daughter, Lacey Kindel, was born in 2009.

Benjamin has represented the Canada under-18 ice hockey team. Benjamin currently plays for the Pittsburgh Penguins after being drafted 11th overall in the 2025 NHL entry draft. Lacey has represented the Canada under-17 soccer team.

== Honors ==
Canada U20

- CONCACAF U-20 Championship: 1996

Vancouver Whitecaps FC

- USL First Division Championship: 2006, 2008
