= Diaz Kambere =

Ugandan-born Canadian soccer player (born 1985)

Diaz Jamin Kambere
Personal information
- Full name: Diaz Jamin Kambere
- Date of birth: October 18, 1985 (age 41)
- Place of birth: Kasese, Uganda
- Height: 1.75 m (5 ft 9 in)
- Position: Defender

Team information
- Current team: Africa United FC
- Number: 4

Youth career
- 2003–2005: Langara Falcons
- 2003–2005: Trinity Western Spartans

Senior career*
Years	Team	Apps	(Gls)
2006–2008	Vancouver Whitecaps	28	(0)
2008	→ Toronto FC (loan)	1	(0)
2009	Abbotsford Mariners	11	(0)
2009	→ Surrey United (loan)	16	(5)
2010	Victoria Highlanders	15	(0)
2011–	Africa United FC	15	(0)

International career
2005–2006	Canada U-23	2	(0)

Managerial career
- 2007–: Semiahmoo Soccer Club
- * Club domestic league appearances and goals

Diaz Kambere (born October 18, 1985) is a former soccer player who plays for Africa United FC in the Multicultural Soccer League of British Columbia. He serves as the senior girls coach at Delview Secondary Born in Uganda, he represented Canada at international level.

== College and amateur career ==
Kambere was born in Uganda, but moved to Surrey, British Columbia with his family as a child. He was a student at Centennial Secondary School in Coquitlam and John Norquay Elementary School in Vancouver, played youth soccer for Vancouver's Italian Canadian Sports Federation (ICSF) and the Eagle Ridge Rogue Selects in Coquitlam, BC, and was also a member of the British Columbia provincial team at the U-15, U-16, and U-18 levels. After moving with his family to the Lower Mainland in 1992 he attended Langara College and then Trinity Western University, where he studied Human Kinetics and Psychology.

== Professional career ==
Kambere signed for the Vancouver Whitecaps of the USL First Division in 2006, subsequently playing in 28 games over two years with the team. On September 6, 2008, he was signed to a 'one day contract' with Toronto FC to be able to play in a game against Chivas USA, due to that squad missing nine players to international duty.

On December 10, 2008, Kambere was released from his contract with the Whitecaps. Having been unable to secure a professional contract, he signed with the Abbotsford Mariners of the USL Premier Development League for the 2009 season.

After a brief loan spell with Surrey United in the Pacific Coast Soccer League, Kambere joined Abbotsford's PDL rivals Victoria Highlanders in 2010.

== International career ==
Kambere represented Canada in the 2008 CONCACAF Olympic Qualifying tournament.

== Coaching career ==
Kambere has coached soccer for the Vancouver Whitecaps Academy, Perform All Out, SFC Pegasus, LFUSA, and CCB Men’s Premier Club who won the men’s 2019 Provincials and Nationals. Diaz also coaches soccer at Delview Secondary School where he works as a child and youth care worker.

== Personal life ==
Before moving to Canada Kambere's father, Amos Kambere, served as a member of the Ugandan Parliament. His older brother, Donald Kambere, played alongside him at Abbotsford, and he has two younger brothers, Jethro and Kule.

== Honours ==
Vancouver Whitecaps

- USL First Division championship: 2008
