= David Morris (soccer) =

Canadian soccer player

Personal information
- Date of birth: February 8, 1978 (age 48)
- Place of birth: Burnaby, British Columbia, Canada
- Height: 6 ft 2 in (1.88 m)
- Position: Defender

Youth career
- Capilano College

Senior career*
Years	Team	Apps	(Gls)
1999	Abbotsford 86ers	15	(14)
1999	→ Vancouver 86ers (loan)	5	(1)
2000–2007	Vancouver Whitecaps	175	(13)
Total		195	(28)
- * Club domestic league appearances and goals

David Morris is a Canadian retired soccer defender who played professionally in the USL First Division. He was the 1999 USL Premier Development League Rookie of the Year.

Morris attended, and played soccer, at Capilano College. In 1996, Capilano won the Canadian college championship. Morris was the tournament MVP. In 1999, Morris signed with the Abbotsford 86ers of the USL Premier Development League. His outstanding play, fourteen goals in fifteen games, led to his selection as the USL PDL Rookie of the Year. It also led to his being called up to the Vancouver 86ers five times that season. In 2000, Morris made a permanent move to Vancouver where he played until 2007. After his retirement from professional soccer, Morris continued playing for Pegasus FC in the Vancouver Metro Soccer League.
