= Sita-Taty Matondo =

Congolese-born Canadian former soccer player

Personal information
- Full name: Sita-Taty Matondo
- Date of birth: December 28, 1984 (age 41)
- Place of birth: Kinshasa, Zaire
- Height: 5 ft 10 in (1.78 m)
- Position: Midfielder

Youth career
- Panellinios FC Quebec

Senior career*
Years	Team	Apps	(Gls)
2003	Montreal Impact	19	(4)
2004	Åtvidabergs FF	4	(0)
2005	Montreal Impact	1	(0)
2005	Toronto Lynx	18	(2)
2006	Vancouver Whitecaps	21	(3)
2007–2008	Montreal Impact	32	(0)
2007	→ Trois-Rivières Attak (loan)	1	(0)
2009	Lasalle-Lakeshore United		
Total		64	(8)

International career
2002–2003	Canada U-20	10	(1)
2003	Canada	1	(0)
- * Club domestic league appearances and goals

Sita-Taty Matondo (born December 28, 1984, in Kinshasa, Zaire) is a Congolese-born Canadian former soccer player who played the majority of his career in Quebec with clubs in the Ligue de Soccer Elite Quebec, USL A-League/First Division, and Canadian Soccer League. He also played abroad in the Superettan, and represented Canada at the international level.

== Career ==
Matondo began his career with Panellinios in the Ligue de Soccer Elite Quebec, where he received the Defender of the Year award, and the Fair-Play award in 1999. In 2003, he signed for the Montreal Impact of the USL A-League. He scored his first goal against Calgary Storm on June 1, 2003, in a 4–0 win. He ended his first pro season with four goals in 21 games. After a successful season with Montreal he was signed by Åtvidabergs FF of the Superettan, where he appeared in four games.

He returned to the Impact in 2005 playing only in one match. After experiencing a shortage of playing time with Montreal he was traded to the Toronto Lynx along with Abraham Francois for Ali Gerba. He made his debut on May 28, 2005, against the Puerto Rico Islanders. He recorded his first goal for the club on June 26, 2005, against Charleston Battery, where he was named man of the match. During the 2005 season he scored two goals and added two assists.

The Vancouver Whitecaps acquired him for the 2006 USL season, where he helped the Caps win the USL First Division Championship by beating the Rochester Raging Rhinos to a score of 3-0 which he scored the third goal to clinch the title. He finished the season with three goals and also helped Vancouver win the Cascadia Cup. On April 11, 2007, he was acquired by the Impact from Vancouver in return for forward Jason McLaughlin. During the 2007 season he was loaned to the Impact's farm team Trois-Rivières Attak of the Canadian Soccer League. He made his debut for the club on August 18, 2007, in a match against the Italia Shooters in a 0–0 tie. He also appeared for the club in the postseason featuring in both the quarterfinal and semifinal matches. In the semi-finals match he contributed by assisting a goal to Nicolas Lesage, but unfortunately wasn't enough to win the match as the Serbian White Eagles FC held on to their 2–1 lead.

On December 2, 2008, the Montreal Impact announced that Matondo along with Gayson Gregory, were released from their contracts. In 2009, he returned to Ligue de Soccer Elite Quebec to play with Lasalle-Lakeshore United.

== International career ==
Matondo represented Canada internationally as a member of the U20, U23 teams. He was a member of the Canada U-20 squad that qualified for the 2003 FIFA U-20 World Cup. He made his senior debut for the Canada national team on January 18, 2003, in a friendly match against the United States. Matondo played futsal at the QCSL World Cup in 2010.

== Honors ==
Vancouver Whitecaps

- USL First Division Championship (1): 2006
- Cascadia Cup: 2006
