= Martin Nash =

Canadian soccer coach & player (born 1975)

- Nash in 2026

Personal information
- Date of birth: December 27, 1975 (age 50)
- Place of birth: Regina, Saskatchewan, Canada
- Height: 1.80 m (5 ft 11 in)
- Position: Central midfielder

Team information
- Current team: Vancouver FC

Youth career
- 1989–1992: Lower Vancouver Island Selects

Senior career*
Years	Team	Apps	(Gls)
1995–1996	Vancouver 86ers	41	(7)
1996–1998	Stockport County	20	(1)
1998–1999	Edmonton Drillers (indoor)	40	(21)
1999	Vancouver 86ers	15	(1)
1999–2000	Chester City	16	(0)
2000–2002	Rochester Raging Rhinos	65	(9)
2002–2003	Macclesfield Town	5	(0)
2003	Montreal Impact	22	(4)
2003–2004	Dallas Sidekicks (indoor)	29	(27)
2004–2010	Vancouver Whitecaps	188	(18)
Total		416	(67)

International career
1997–2010	Canada	38	(2)

Managerial career
- 2013–2016: Ottawa Fury FC (assistant)
- 2017: Canada (assistant)
- 2018: Calgary Foothills FC (assistant)
- 2019–2021: Cavalry FC (assistant)
- 2021–2024: York United
- 2025–: Vancouver FC
Medal record
Representing Canada
Men's soccer
CONCACAF Gold Cup
Winner	2000 United States
- * Club domestic league appearances and goals

Martin Nash (born December 27, 1975) is a Canadian soccer coach and former player who serves as interim head coach of Vancouver FC.

A five-time all-league selection in the USL-1 and its predecessor, the A-League, Nash has won four league championships, two with the Rochester Rhinos in 2000 and 2001 and two with the Vancouver Whitecaps in 2006 and 2008. He spent the majority of his playing career in North America, most notably in the Vancouver area, but also played in England for Stockport County, Chester City and Macclesfield Town.

Nash was also a regular member of the Canadian national soccer team, making 38 appearances and scoring 2 goals during his 13-year career.

He is the younger brother of retired basketball superstar Steve Nash.

== Club career ==
=== Early career ===
Nash began his career with the Vancouver 86ers in 1995. He was named to the all-A-League team in his second season with the 86ers as a 20-year-old in 1996. He spent the next several years jumping backwards and forwards across the Atlantic: he also played 5 games for a Stockport County side in 1996–97 that won promotion to Football League First Division and appeared in 15 games as a substitute for the club's first-team the next season. He also played briefly for Third Division Chester City in 1999, on loan for Third Division Macclesfield Town in February 2003, and had a short stint with the Edmonton Drillers in 1998–1999.

=== Rochester Raging Rhinos ===
Nash played for the Rochester Raging Rhinos of the A-League from 2000 to 2003, winning back-to-back league titles in 2000 and 2001. He was given second-team all-league honours in 2000.

=== Montreal Impact ===
He spent the 2003 season with the Montreal Impact, before signing with the Vancouver Whitecaps for a third time in 2004. During this time, Nash also played pro indoor soccer in the Major Indoor Soccer League, playing the 2003–04 season with the Dallas Sidekicks.

=== Vancouver Whitecaps ===
In 2006, Nash helped Vancouver capture their first USL First Division Championship, beating Rochester Raging Rhinos by a score of 3–0. He established a new team record for longest ironman streak, playing 77 consecutive games over three seasons. The record had previously belonged to Domenic Mobilio with 68 games. After being named to two Second All-League teams in 1996 and 2000, Nash received First All-League honours in 2007 with the Whitecaps. The following season, on September 30, 2008, Nash was named to his second consecutive USL-1 First All-League Team, en route to another USL-1 Championship on October 12, 2008, beating the Puerto Rico Islanders 2–1 in Vancouver. The win marked Nash's fourth league title (including the USL's predecessor, the A-League).

With the departure of Jeff Clarke following the Whitecaps' championship, Nash succeeded Clarke as team captain on January 26, 2009. He missed the final five games of the regular season after pulling his hamstring in a game against the Rochester Rhinos on August 29. He returned in time for the playoff opener against the Carolina RailHawks. In the midst of Vancouver's playoff run, Nash was named to the Second All-League team. Despite finishing the 2009 regular season as the seventh and final seed in the playoffs, Nash and the Whitecaps advanced to the finals for the second consecutive year, eliminating the RailHawks and Timbers, the league's top two seeds. In the first leg of the final against the Montreal Impact, however, Nash was assessed a red card in the 52nd minute after delivering a tackle to Roberto Brown, suspending him for the remainder of the two-leg final. Brown was carried off the field on a stretcher but quickly returned to finish the game, which Montreal won 3–2.

Despite expectations that he would captain the Whitecaps as the team entered Major League Soccer in 2011, Nash announced his retirement from professional soccer on October 27, 2010, stating "Today is a day of mixed emotions for me, but we all decide to move on. I'm glad to end my career here, where it all started". Nash accepted a new role as a scout and youth playing coach with the club.

== International career ==
Nash made his debut for Canada in an April 1997 FIFA World Cup qualification match against El Salvador. Along with Jason De Vos, Paul Stalteri and Jason Bent, he formed a new generation of Canadian internationals who would succeed the retiring veterans Frank Yallop, Colin Miller, Randy Samuel and Alex Bunbury. He earned a total of 38 caps, scoring 2 goals. He has represented Canada in 10 FIFA World Cup qualification matches. He was a member of the Canadian squad at the 2007 CONCACAF Gold Cup.

=== International goals ===
Scores and results list Canada's goal tally first.

#	Date	Venue	Opponent	Score	Result	Competition
1	January 11, 2000	National Stadium, Hamilton, Bermuda	Bermuda	1–0	2–0	Friendly
2	January 11, 2000	National Stadium, Hamilton, Bermuda	Bermuda	2–0	2–0	Friendly

== Coaching career ==
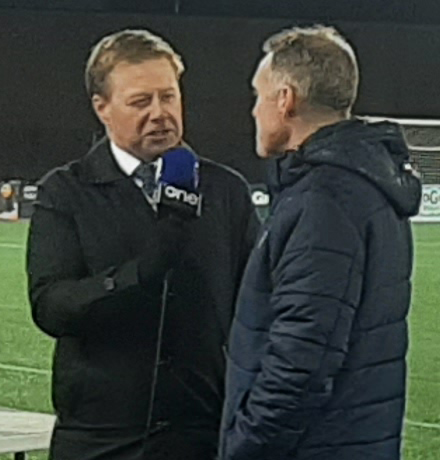
Nash (right) upon his head coaching debut in 2022

Nash was named the assistant coach of the Ottawa Fury on October 18, 2013, for their inaugural year in the North American Soccer League. On October 31, 2016, Nash announced he was leaving the Fury to pursue other opportunities.

In January 2017, Nash served as an assistant coach for the Canada men's national team under interim head coach Michael Findlay.

On May 11, 2018, he was named as an assistant coach for Calgary Foothills FC. After helping lead Calgary Foothills to the PDL Championship in 2018, he joined Tommy Wheeldon Jr. on the inaugural coaching staff of Canadian Premier League club Cavalry FC, being named assistant coach and technical director.

On December 21, 2021, he was announced as the head coach of York United FC of the Canadian Premier League. On May 21, 2024, he was relieved of his duties as the club's head coach.

On July 23, 2025, Nash was appointed interim manager of Vancouver FC for the remainder of the 2025 season after the departure of head coach Afshin Ghotbi.

== Managerial statistics ==
As of July 23, 2025

Team	From	To	Record							
Team	From	To	G	W	D	L	GF	GA	GD	Win %
York United	December 21, 2021	May 21, 2024	68	23	15	30	82	103	−21	33.82
Vancouver FC (interim)	July 23, 2025	present	0	0	0	0	0	0	+0	—
Career totals			68	23	15	30	82	103	−21	33.82

== Honours ==
=== Player ===
Rochester Raging Rhinos

- A-League: 2000, 2001

Vancouver Whitecaps

- USL First Division: 2006, 2008

Canada

- CONCACAF Gold Cup: 2000

Individual

- USSF D-2 Pro League Best XI: 2010
