= Joey Gjertsen =

American professional soccer player (born 1982)

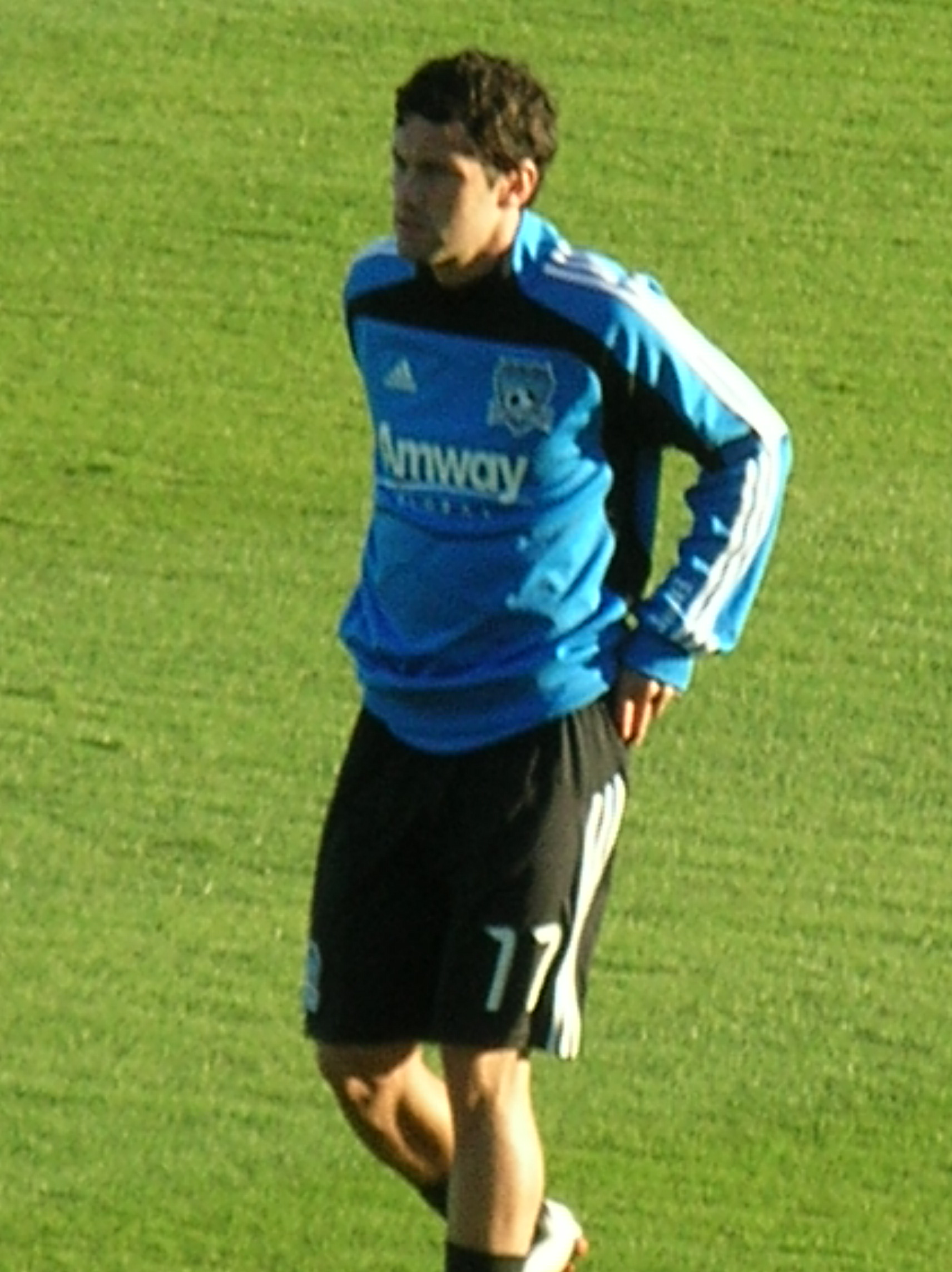
- Gjertsen vs Philadelphia, September 2010

Personal information
- Full name: Joseph Gjertsen
- Date of birth: June 13, 1982 (age 44)
- Place of birth: Tacoma, Washington, United States
- Height: 5 ft 9 in (1.75 m)
- Position: Midfielder

College career
Years	Team	Apps	(Gls)
2001	Tacoma Titans		(31)
2002	Yavapai Roughriders		
2003–2004	Evergreen State Geoducks		

Senior career*
Years	Team	Apps	(Gls)
2005–2007	Vancouver Whitecaps	74	(18)
2007–2009	Montreal Impact	66	(4)
2010–2012	San Jose Earthquakes	36	(2)
2014–2019	Tacoma Stars (indoor)	78	(40)
2015–2016	Seattle Sounders FC U-23	11	(6)
- * Club domestic league appearances and goals as of 26 November 2019

Joey Gjertsen (born June 13, 1982) is an American professional soccer player.

== Career ==
=== College ===
Gjertsen started his college soccer at Tacoma Community College where he produced 31 goals and a school record 14 assists in his freshman campaign. He then transferred to Yavapai College where he won a NJCAA national championship. Transferring once again, he enjoyed a successful two-year career at The Evergreen State College, earning All-American honors, All-Region Team and Region I Player of the year honors in 2004. He was named as the Conference Player of the Year, as he led the league with 27 goals in 2003. It was during that same season that he once scored 5 goals and an assist in one game, as well as hitting three consecutive hat-tricks. At Evergreen, Gjertsen holds the record with 54 career goals after spending only two of his four years at the college.

=== Professional ===
Gjertsen found instant professional success after signing with Vancouver Whitecaps in 2005. He was named Team Rookie of the Year, earning 27 caps (15 starts) and finding the back of the net three times. 2006 proved to be an even better year for Gjertsen, as he played in all 28 games (26 starts) and led the team in scoring with 31 points (12 goals and 7 assists). He success earned him First Team USL honors, announced in September 2006. On September 29, 2006, Gjertsen was named USL MVP at the league's championship weekend banquet in Rochester, New York. Gjertsen was instrumental in the Whitecaps' first USL-1 championship, won in 2006. His first half cross was deflected into the goal by a Rhinos defender for the first Whitecaps goal, and he assisted on another in Vancouver's 3–0 defeat of the Rochester Rhinos.

Gjertsen was traded to Montreal Impact on July 26, 2007, along with midfielder David Testo for midfielder José Roberto Gomes Santana and forward Alen Marcina. On October 24, 2007, he signed a two-year deal with the club.

He played an important role by starting all 10 games in Montreal's 2008-09 CONCACAF Champions League run, scoring in the first leg of Montreal's preliminary round tie against Real Estelí of Nicaragua, which saw Montreal through to the Group Stage. In the final Group Stage match, Gjertsen scored against Atlante F.C. of Mexico in a match which Montreal eventually lost 2–1. He added four assists during this tournament.

In the 2009 USL final, he was influential in Montreal's success, scoring the game-winning goal in the second leg of the Championship series against his former Whitecaps.

On January 20, 2010, Gjertsen signed with San Jose Earthquakes of Major League Soccer.

Gjertsen remained with San Jose through 2012, but after missing that entire season due to R. Patellar Tendon surgery he was released on November 28, 2012. Gjertsen subsequently entered the 2012 MLS Re-Entry Draft and became a free agent after going undrafted in both rounds of the draft.
