= List of soccer stadiums in Canada =

The following is a partial list of Canadian soccer stadiums, in order by capacity. Not all stadiums are used exclusively for soccer; some also host Canadian football, rugby and/or track and field.

== Current stadiums ==
=== Capacity of at least 15,000 ===
Rank	Stadium	Capacity	City	Province	Soccer tenants and uses	Notes	Image
1	Commonwealth Stadium	56,302	Edmonton	Alberta	Canada men's national team, Canada women's national team. Former home of the Edmonton Drillers. A site of the 2007 FIFA U-20 World Cup, 2002 FIFA U-19 Women's World Championship, 2014 FIFA U-20 Women's World Cup, and 2015 FIFA Women's World Cup. Formerly FC Edmonton's home for the Canadian Championship.		
2	Olympic Stadium	56,040	Montreal	Quebec	Part-time home of the CF Montréal. Former home of the Montreal Manic. Host site for the 1976 Summer Olympics. A site of the 2007 FIFA U-20 World Cup, 2014 FIFA U-20 Women's World Cup, and 2015 FIFA Women's World Cup.	Domed stadium	
3	BC Place	54,320	Vancouver	British Columbia	Vancouver Whitecaps FC, Canada men's national team, Canada women's national team. Former home of the Vancouver Whitecaps. A site of the 2015 FIFA Women's World Cup and 2026 FIFA World Cup.	Retractable Roof	
4	McMahon Stadium	37,317	Calgary	Alberta	Calgary Wild FC, former home of the Calgary Boomers and Calgary Mustangs		
5	Princess Auto Stadium	33,234	Winnipeg	Manitoba	A site of the 2015 FIFA Women's World Cup. Former home of Valour FC.		
6	Mosaic Stadium	33,000	Regina	Saskatchewan			
7	BMO Field	28,351	Toronto	Ontario	Toronto FC, Canada men's national team, Canada women's national team. A site of the 2007 FIFA U-20 World Cup, 2014 FIFA U-20 Women's World Cup and 2026 FIFA World Cup		
8	TD Place Stadium	24,000	Ottawa	Ontario	Atlético Ottawa, Ottawa Rapid FC. Former home of the Ottawa Fury. A host site for the 1976 Summer Olympics soccer matches, 2007 FIFA U-20 World Cup, and 2015 FIFA Women's World Cup		
9	Hamilton Stadium	24,000	Hamilton	Ontario	Forge FC. Hosted soccer at the 2015 Pan American Games		
10	Percival Molson Memorial Stadium	23,420	Montreal	Quebec	McGill Redbirds		
11	Saputo Stadium	19,619	Montreal	Quebec	CF Montréal. Formerly some Canada men's and women's national team matches		

=== Capacity between 4,000 and 15,000 ===
#	Stadium	Capacity	City	Province	Soccer tenants and uses	Notes
12	Telus Stadium	12,257	Québec	Quebec	Laval Rouge-et-Or. Formerly some Montreal Impact matches	
13	Lamport Stadium	9,600	Toronto	Ontario	Former home of SC Toronto, TMU Bold, and the TFC Academy	
14	Complexe Claude-Robillard	9,500	Montreal	Quebec	Former home of the Montreal Impact	
15	Richardson Memorial Stadium	8,500	Kingston	Ontario	Queen's Golden Gaels	
16	Croix-Bleue Medavie Stadium	8,300	Moncton	New Brunswick	A host site for the 2014 FIFA U-20 Women's World Cup and the 2015 FIFA Women's World Cup	Expandable to 25,000
17	Western Alumni Stadium	8,000	London	Ontario	Western Ontario Mustangs	Expandable to 16,000
18	Alumni Stadium	7,600	Guelph	Ontario	Guelph Gryphons	Expandable to 13,362
19	Wanderers Grounds	7,500	Halifax	Nova Scotia	Halifax Tides FC, HFX Wanderers FC	Expanded from 6,500 to 7,500 for 2025 season
20	Willoughby Stadium	6,560	Langley	British Columbia	Vancouver FC	
21	King George V Park	6,400	St. John's	Newfoundland and Labrador	Memorial Sea-Hawks, Canada women's national team. Formerly some Canada men's national team matches. A site of the 1987 FIFA U-16 World Championship. Host site of the 1985 CONCACAF Championship Final	Oldest surviving soccer-specific stadium in North America
22	Griffiths Stadium	6,171	Saskatoon	Saskatchewan	Saskatchewan Huskies	Expandable to 12,567
=23	Ron Joyce Stadium	6,000	Hamilton	Ontario	McMaster Maurauders	Expandable to 12,000
=23	University Stadium	6,000	Waterloo	Ontario	Wilfrid Laurier Golden Hawks	
=23	Starlight Stadium	6,000	Langford	British Columbia	Pacific FC. Former home of Victoria Highlanders	
=23	ATCO Field	6,000	Calgary	Alberta	Cavalry FC	
27	Stade Boréale	5,581	Laval, Quebec	Quebec	Montreal Roses FC, FC Supra du Québec	
28	Swangard Stadium	5,288	Burnaby	British Columbia	Vancouver Rise FC, TSS Rovers FC, former home of the Vancouver Whitecaps, 2007 FIFA U-20 World Cup, 2002 FIFA U-19 Women's World Championship, and home of the Vancouver Whitecaps FC Women	Capacity expandable to over 10,000
29	CEPSUM Stadium	5,100	Montreal	Quebec	Montréal Carabins	
=30	Canada Games Stadium	5,000	Saint John	New Brunswick	UNBSJ Seawolves	Expandable to 30,000
=30	Centennial Stadium	5,000	Victoria	British Columbia	Victoria Vikes, Victoria Highlanders FC, 2002 FIFA U-19 Women's World Championship	
=30	Clarke Stadium	5,000	Edmonton	Alberta	MacEwan Griffins	Former home of FC Edmonton
=30	Monarch Park Stadium	5,000	Toronto	Ontario	Toronto school teams - Monarch Park Lions (home team)	
=30	Saskatoon Minor Football Field	5,000	Saskatoon	Saskatchewan	Forza Soccer Academy, Saskatchewan EXCEL	
=30	University Stadium	5,000	Winnipeg	Manitoba	Manitoba Bisons	Expandable to 10,000
=30	Varsity Stadium	5,000	Toronto	Ontario	Varsity Blues; Former home of Toronto City, Toronto Falcons, Toronto Metros, and Toronto Lynx	
=30	SMS Equipment Stadium	5,000	Fort McMurray	Alberta	FC Edmonton and Edmonton Eskimos both played two regular-season games at Shell Place in 2015.	Expandable to 20,000
=38	Concordia Stadium	4,000	Montreal	Quebec	Concordia Stingers	
=38	Municipal Stadium	4,000	Sherbrooke	Quebec	local teams	
=38	York Lions Stadium	4,000	Toronto	Ontario	AFC Toronto, Inter Toronto FC, York Lions	Expandable to 12,500

=== Capacity between 1,000 and 4,000 ===
#	Stadium	Capacity	City	Province	Soccer tenants and uses	Notes
39	Royal Athletic Park	3,800	Victoria	British Columbia	Victoria United, Victoria Highlanders, 2007 FIFA U-20 World Cup	
=40	Berthiaume-du-Tremblay Stadium	3,500	Chomedey	Quebec	N/A	
=40	Foote Field (East Field)	3,500	Edmonton	Alberta	Alberta Golden Bears. Former home of FC Edmonton	
=40	Fort William Stadium	3,500	Thunder Bay	Ontario	Thunder Bay Chill	
=40	Thunderbird Stadium	3,500	Vancouver	British Columbia	UBC Thunderbirds, Varsity FC, Vancouver Thunderbirds	In addition to its seating capacity of 3,500, it also has a 5,000 spectator capacity lawn-area effectively giving the venue an 8,500 spectator capacity
44	Centennial Stadium	3,200	Kitchener	Ontario	N/A	
45	Keith Harris Stadium	3,044	Ottawa	Ontario	Temporary home of Ottawa Fury FC	
=46	Esther Shiner Stadium	3,000	Toronto	Ontario	North York Astros	
=46	Raymond Field	3,000	Wolfville	Nova Scotia	Acadia Axemen & Axewomen	Capacity is 5,000 with standing-room
=46	Windsor Stadium	3,000	Windsor	Ontario	Windsor Stars	
=49	York Stadium	2,500	Toronto	Ontario	York University	In addition to 2,500 seat capacity it features 1,000 in grass seating capacity
=49	Exhibition Stadium	2,500	Chilliwack	British Columbia	Chilliwack Huskers, formerly hosted Vancouver Whitecaps friendlies.	
51	Apple Bowl	2,314	Kelowna	British Columbia	Okanagan Challenge, rare host of Vancouver Whitecaps matches.	Expandable to 5,700
=52	Centennial Park Stadium	2,200	Toronto	Ontario	Toronto Lynx, Toronto Lady Lynx, Serbian White Eagles, Toronto Atomic FC, and Etobicoke Eagles. Former home of Toronto Supra Portuguese	
=52	McLeod Athletic Park	2,200	Langley	British Columbia	Langley Athletic and various amateur	
=54	The Soccer Centre	2,000	Vaughan	Ontario	Toronto FC II	
=54	Birchmount Stadium	2,000	Toronto	Ontario	local amateur teams including Scarborough SC, Toronto Maddogs, University of Toronto non-varsity teams	
=54	Wickwire Field	2,000	Halifax	Nova Scotia	Dalhousie Tigers	
=54	John Scouras Field	2,000	Winnipeg	Manitoba	WSA Winnipeg. Former home of Winnipeg Fury	Expandable to 10,000
=54	Minoru Park Stadium	2,000	Richmond	British Columbia	Various W-League and USL PDL matches for Whitecaps	
=54	Servus Sports Centre	2,000	Lethbridge	Alberta	Lethbridge Soccer Association, Lethbridge FC	
=54	University of Lethbridge Community Stadium	2,000	Lethbridge	Alberta	University of Lethbridge	
=54	Steve Brown Sports Complex	2,000	Brantford	Ontario	Brantford Galaxy	
=54	University of Windsor Stadium	2,000	Windsor	Ontario	Windsor Lancers	
63	SFU Stadium	1,823	Burnaby	British Columbia	Simon Fraser University	Can also temporarily expand to seat an additional 1000 people if necessary with the addition of extra bleachers.
64	Warrior Field	1,700	Waterloo	Ontario	SC Waterloo Region	Total capacity of 5,700 including grass berm seating
=65	Barrie Community Sports Complex	1,500	Midhurst	Ontario	Huronia Stallions Football and Barrie Soccer Club	
=65	Foote Field (West Field)	1,500	Edmonton	Alberta	Alberta Golden Bears. Former home of FC Edmonton	
=65	Nelson Stadium	1,500	Burlington	Ontario	Burlington SC	
=65	Goudy Field	1,500	Victoria	British Columbia	Former home of Victoria Highlanders	
69	Percy Perry Stadium	1,482	Coquitlam	British Columbia	Coquitlam Metro-Ford Soccer Club	
70	Hillside Stadium	1,060	Kamloops	British Columbia	Thompson Rivers WolfPack, Rivers FC, Kamloops Heat	
=71	Bateman Park	1,000	Abbotsford	British Columbia	Fraser Valley Cascades, Abbotsford Mariners	
=71	German-Canadian Club of London Field	1,000	London	Ontario	Forest City London	
=71	Kalar Sports Park	1,000	Niagara Falls	Ontario	Niagara United	

== Former stadiums ==
#	Stadium	Capacity	City	Province	Soccer tenants and uses	Closed	Demolished	Notes
1	Exhibition Stadium	54,741	Toronto	Ontario		1989	1999	
2	Rogers Centre	47,568	Toronto	Ontario	Occasional Canada matches, and rare winter matches for Toronto FC			The stadium remains open but has been reconfigured for baseball-only usage
3	Empire Field	27,528	Vancouver	British Columbia	Vancouver Whitecaps FC (2011)	2011	2011	A temporary stadium that served as the home of the Vancouver Whitecaps during major renovations to BC Place
4	Mosaic Stadium at Taylor Field	33,427	Regina	Saskatchewan	Regina Riot	2016		Replaced by Mosaic Stadium
5	Autostade	33,172	Montreal	Quebec	Montreal Olympique (1971, 1973)	1976		
6	Empire Stadium	32,729	Vancouver	British Columbia	Vancouver Whitecaps (1974–1983), Vancouver Royals (1967–1968)	1993	1993	
7	Ivor Wynne Stadium	29,600	Hamilton	Ontario	McMaster Maurauders (2005–2007)	2012	2012–2013	Demolished, replaced by Tim Hortons Field
8	Canad Inns Stadium	29,533	Winnipeg	Manitoba	Winnipeg Fury (1987–1992)	2013	2013	
8	Varsity Stadium (original)	21,739	Toronto	Ontario	Varsity Blues (1898–2001), Toronto City (1967), Toronto Falcons, Toronto Metros, Toronto Lynx	2001	2001	
10=	Clarke Stadium (original)	20,000	Edmonton	Alberta	Edmonton Drillers (1982), Edmonton Brick Men	2001	2013	
10=	Delorimier Stadium	20,000	Montreal	Quebec		1960	1965	
12	Hamilton Amateur Athletic Association Grounds	12,000	Hamilton	Ontario				The field is still used, but the stadium was demolished
13	Mewata Stadium	10,000	Calgary	Alberta	Calgary Kickers (1987–1989), Canada men's national under-23 team	1999	1999	
14	Osborne Stadium	7,800	Winnipeg	Manitoba		1952	1956	
15	Athletic Park	6,000	Vancouver	British Columbia	UBC Thunderbirds (1924–1930)	1951	1951	
16	Brian Timmis Stadium	5,000	Hamilton	Ontario	Hamilton Avalanche, Hamilton Croatia	2012	2013	
16=	Callister Park	5,000	Vancouver	British Columbia	Pacific Coast Soccer League	1970	1971	
16=	Huskies Stadium	5,000	Halifax	Nova Scotia	Saint Mary's Huskies	2013	2013	Was expandable to 11,000
19	Rosedale Field	4,000	Toronto	Ontario				Capacity could exceed 10,000 with standing room; The field is still used for soccer, but the stadium was demolished

== See also ==
- Rogers Centre - Formerly used for occasional Canada matches, and rare winter matches and friendlies for Toronto FC. Renovated for baseball-only use in 2016.
- List of Canadian Football League stadiums
- List of Canadian Premier League stadiums
- List of indoor arenas in Canada
- List of Major League Soccer stadiums
- List of stadiums in Canada
- Soccer-specific stadium
- List of association football stadiums by capacity
- List of association football stadiums by country
- List of sports venues by capacity
- Soccer in Canada
- Lists of stadiums
