= 2010 Pacific Coast Soccer League season =

Pacific Coast Soccer League
- Season: 2010
- Champions: M Vancouver Thunderbirds, W Whitecaps Prospects
- Matches: 51
- Goals: 165 (3.24 per match)
- Top goalscorer: Meysam Soltani (10)
- Biggest home win: Victoria Highlanders 7-0 Victoria United (07-Jul-2010)

The 2010 Pacific Coast Soccer League season was the 15th season in the modern era of the league. The regular season began on 1 May and ended on 18 July, and was followed by the Challenge Cup, a post season tournament of the top four teams to determine the league's champion. Each team played 16 games. The women's open division consisted of 9 teams while the men's open division had 7.

In the Men's Premier division, the Vancouver Thunderbirds won both the season and the playoffs. In the Women's Premier division, the Whitecaps Prospects finished the regular season in first place, but the Fraser Valley Action won the playoffs.

== Men's ==
The 2010 Pacific Coast Soccer League season will be played from 1 May to 18 July 2010. This season will see 7 teams on the Premier Men's group compete. At the end of the season there will be a play-off to determine which team will enter the BC Senior A Cup.

=== Standings ===
Place	Team	P	W	L	T	GF	GA	GD	Points
1	Vancouver Thunderbirds	16	12	1	3	30	9	+21	39
2	Khalsa Sporting Club	16	9	6	1	29	31	-2	28
3	Okanagan Challenge	16	7	6	3	21	17	+4	24
4	Victoria Highlanders Reserves	16	5	6	5	29	20	+9	20
5	Victoria United	16	6	8	2	36	29	+7	20
6	Kamloops Excel SC	16	4	6	6	19	26	-7	18
7	Athletic Club of BC	16	1	11	4	16	34	-18	7

=== Results table ===
Abbreviation and Color Key: Athletic Club of BC - ABC • Kamloops Excel - KAM • Khalsa Sporting Club - KHA Okanagan Challenge - OKA • Vancouver Thunderbirds - VAN • Victoria Highlanders Reserve - VHR • Victoria United - VIC Win • Loss • Tie • Home
Club	Match															
Club	1	2	3	4	5	6	7	8	9	10	11	12	13	14	15	16
Athletic Club of BC	VAN	VIC	KAM	OKA	KHA	VHR	VAN	OKA	VIC	VHR	VAN	KHA	OKA	KAM	VIC	KAM
Athletic Club of BC	1-2	5-1	3-3	0-3	1-4	1-1	1-1	1-1	0-2	1-5	0-4	1-3	0-1	0-1	0-1	0-1
Kamloops Excel	OKA	VHR	ABC	VAN	KHA	VHR	VIC	KHA	VAN	OKA	VHR	VIC	OKA	KHA	ABC	ABC
Kamloops Excel	3-0	1-2	3-3	0-1	2-2	1-1	0-0	0-2	0-4	1-1	2-2	4-2	0-4	0-2	1-0	1-0
Khalsa Sporting Club	VIC	VHR	VAN	VHR	ABC	OKA	KAM	VAN	KAM	OKA	VHR	VIC	ABC	KAM	VAN	VIC
Khalsa Sporting Club	3-2	1-0	1-2	2-1	1-4	0-1	2-2	0-3	2-0	0-1	2-4	5-1	3-1	0-2	0-1	1-11
Okanagan Challenge	VIC	VHR	KAM	VHR	ABC	KHA	VAN	ABC	VAN	KHA	KAM	VIC	VHR	KAM	ABC	VAN
Okanagan Challenge	1-2	1-3	0-3	3-2	3-0	0-1	0-2	1-1	1-2	1-0	1-1	2-0	2-0	4-0	1-0	0-0
Vancouver Thunderbirds	KHA	VIC	ABC	VHR	KAM	OKA	ABC	VIC	VHR	KHA	OKA	KAM	ABC	VIC	KHA	OKA
Vancouver Thunderbirds	2-1	1-0	2-1	1-0	1-0	2-0	1-1	5-2	0-0	3-0	2-1	4-0	4-0	1-3	1-0	0-0
Victoria Highlanders	KHA	OKA	KHA	KAM	VAN	VIC	OKA	ABC	KAM	VAN	KHA	ABC	KAM	OKA	VIC	VIC
Victoria Highlanders	0-1	3-1	1-2	2-1	0-1	1-1	2-3	1-1	1-1	0-0	4-2	5-1	2-2	0-2	7-0	0-1
Victoria United	KHA	OKA	VAN	ABC	VHR	VAN	KAM	ABC	KHA	OKA	KAM	VHR	VHR	VAN	ABC	KHA
Victoria United	2-3	2-1	0-1	1-5	1-1	2-5	0-0	2-0	1-5	0-2	2-4	0-7	1-0	3-1	1-0	11-1

== Women's ==
The teams played a 16-game, unbalanced schedule. The Whitecaps residency program that recruits from around the province ran rough shod over the other teams. The Victoria Highlanders women also were dominant with two former professionals on their roster.

=== Standings ===
Place	Team	P	W	L	T	GF	GA	GD	Points
1	Whitecaps Prospects	16	16	0	0	87	10	+77	48
2	Victoria Highlanders Women	16	12	3	1	53	9	+44	37
3	Fraser Valley Action	16	10	3	3	44	31	+13	33
4	NSGSC Eagles	16	10	6	0	40	37	+3	30
5	Chilliwack FC	16	8	6	2	22	25	-3	24
6	Coquitlam Metro-Ford Xtreme	16	5	10	1	14	29	-15	16
7	Okanagan Whitecaps FC	16	3	12	1	18	61	-43	10
8	TSS Academy	16	2	11	3	18	54	-36	9
9	Richmond GSC	16	0	15	1	2	40	-38	1

=== Top Goalscorers ===
Name	Club	Goals
Liz Hansen	Victoria Highlanders	19
Daniela Gerig	Fraser Valley Action	16
Jenna Richardson	Whitecaps Prospects	14
Abigail Raymer	Whitecaps Prospects	12
Nikki Wright	Whitecaps Prospects	10
Alicia Tesan	Fraser Valley Action	9
Maryse Reichgeld	Whitecaps Prospects	8
Jenna Di Nunzio	Whitecaps Prospects	7
Jaclyn Sawicki	Whitecaps Prospects	7
Paige Scott	Victoria Highlanders	6
