= Desmond Tachie =

Canadian soccer player (born 1984)

Personal information
- Full name: Desmond Tachie
- Date of birth: May 1, 1984 (age 42)
- Place of birth: Vancouver, British Columbia, Canada
- Height: 5 ft 8 in (1.73 m)
- Position: Forward

Team information
- Current team: West Van FC
- Number: 19

Youth career
- 1998–2002: Vancouver Selects
- 2003: Capilano College
- 2013–2014: Capilano Blues

Senior career*
Years	Team	Apps	(Gls)
2004–2005	Edmonton Aviators	13	(0)
2005	Ottawa Fury	15	(7)
2005	Toronto Lynx	10	(5)
2006–2008	Kaposvölgye VSC	33	(7)
2009	West Van		
2009	Bridges		
2009	Athletic Club of BC		
2010	Charlotte Eagles	7	(0)
2011	AaB B		
2012	Rovers United		
2012	Fremad Amager	4	(0)
2013–?	West Van FC		
2019	TSS FC Rovers	2	(0)
- * Club domestic league appearances and goals

Desmond Tachie-Mason (born May 1, 1984) is a Canadian soccer player, who is currently playing and working as coach for the Vancouver Metro Soccer League club West Van FC.

== Career ==
=== College ===
Tachie played for the Vancouver Selects and attended Capilano College, who he led to the Canadian Colleges Championship in 2003, earning Canadian Colleges and British Columbia Colleges All-Star selections.

=== Professional ===
Tachie turned professional in 2004, playing with the Edmonton Aviators in the USL First Division, appearing in 13 games. Following a successful season with Ottawa Fury in the USL Premier Development League in 2005, during which scored 7 goals and 7 assists in 15 games, Tachie signed with the Toronto Lynx.

Tachie moved to Hungary in 2007 when he signed for Kaposvölgye VSC. He spent the next two seasons playing in the Hungarian league, scoring 7 goals in 33 appearances for Kaposvölgye, before returning to North America in 2009.

He trialed with Major League Soccer expansion club Seattle Sounders FC in the early months of 2009, and was a Sounders SuperSearch finalist, but was ultimately not offered a contract by the club, and returned to Canada.

He subsequently played with several Canadian amateur teams, including the Capilano Blues of the Vancouver Metro Soccer League and Athletic Club of BC of the Pacific Coast Soccer League, before signing with the Charlotte Eagles of the USL Second Division in 2010.

Tachie played for Aalborg BK in Denmark before moving back to Vancouver, British Columbia, Canada in 2013 where he is currently a staff coach at West Vancouver Soccer Club, and the assistant coach for Capilano University's men's team.

== Personal ==
Tachie comes from Kumasi in Ghana. He emigrated to Canada in the mid 1990s.
