= 2011 Pacific Coast Soccer League season =

Pacific Coast Soccer League
- Season: 2011
- Champions: M Vancouver Thunderbirds, W Vancouver Thunderbirds
- Top goalscorer: Oriol Torres (11)

The 2011 Pacific Coast Soccer League season was the 16th season in the modern era of the league. The regular season began on 14 May and ended on 16 July, and was followed by the Challenge Cup, a post season tournament of the top four teams to determine the league's champion. Each team played between 12 and 13 matches depending on the division entered. The women's open division consisted of 11 teams while the men's open division had 7.

In the Men's Premier division, the Vancouver Thunderbirds finished the season in first place, but Okanagan Challenge won the playoff finals. In the Women's Premier division, the Vancouver Thunderbirds won both the season and the playoffs.

== Men's Premier Division Teams ==
Team	Location	Head Coach
Kamloops Excel SC	Kamloops, British Columbia	
Khalsa Sporting Club	Coquitlam, British Columbia	
Mid Isle Highlanders FC	Ladysmith, British Columbia	
Okanagan Challenge	Kelowna, British Columbia	Kelly Wolverton
Surrey United SC	Surrey, British Columbia	
Vancouver Thunderbirds	Vancouver, British Columbia	
Victoria United	Victoria, British Columbia	Nick Daniel

Pos	Team	Pld	W	D	L	GF	GA	GD	Pts
1	Vancouver Thunderbirds	12	9	0	3	39	13	+26	27
2	Surrey United SC	12	8	2	2	29	21	+8	26
3	Khalsa Sporting Club	12	6	1	5	26	27	−1	19
4	Okanagan Challenge	12	5	2	5	26	29	−3	17
5	Victoria United	12	5	0	7	24	28	−4	15
6	Mid Isle Highlanders FC	12	3	1	8	17	29	−12	10
7	Kamloops Excel SC	12	2	2	8	27	43	−16	8

Source: pcsl.org
Rules for classification: 1) points; 2) goal difference; 3) number of goals scored.

== Men's Reserve Division Teams ==
Team	Location	Head Coach
Coquitlam Metro-Ford SC	Coquitlam, British Columbia	
Chilliwack FC	Chilliwack, British Columbia	
Okanagan FC	Okanagan District, British Columbia	
Penticton Pinnacles	Penticton, British Columbia	
Vancouver FC	Vancouver, British Columbia	
Victoria United	Victoria, British Columbia	Mike Pawlak
West Van FC	West Vancouver, British Columbia	

== Women's ==
=== Format ===
The teams will play a 13-game, unbalanced schedule.

=== Standings ===
Pos	Team	Pld	W	D	L	GF	GA	GD	Pts
1	Vancouver Thunderbirds	13	10	3	0	31	5	+26	33
2	Whitecaps Prospects	13	9	4	0	34	13	+21	31
3	Fraser Valley Action	13	9	3	1	41	12	+29	30
4	Surrey United SC	13	7	3	3	40	26	+14	24
5	Abbotsford SA	13	4	5	4	22	23	−1	17
6	West Van FC	13	4	2	7	14	22	−8	14
7	TSS Academy	13	4	2	7	12	18	−6	14
8	Coquitlam Metro-Ford Xtreme	13	3	3	7	16	38	−22	11 (Note: 1 point deducted?)
9	NSGSC Eagles	13	1	2	10	9	32	−23	5
10	Okanagan Whitecaps FC	13	0	2	11	16	44	−28	2
