= Marcus Haber =

Canadian soccer player (born 1989)

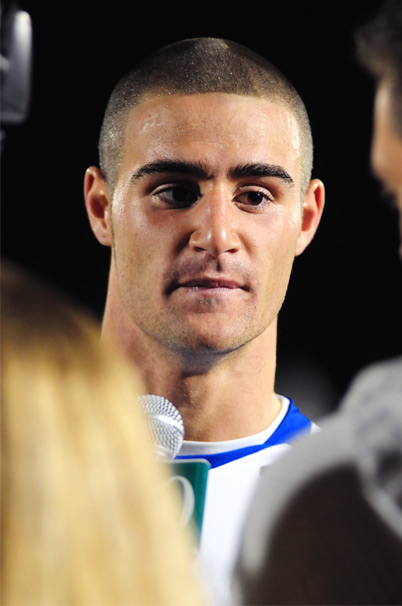
- Haber with the Vancouver Whitecaps in 2009

Personal information
- Full name: Marcus Warren Haber
- Date of birth: January 11, 1989 (age 37)
- Place of birth: Vancouver, Canada
- Height: 6 ft 4 in (1.92 m)
- Position: Striker

Team information
- Current team: One Taguig
- Number: 7

Youth career
- 2002–2006: Vancouver Selects
- 2006–2008: Groningen

Senior career*
Years	Team	Apps	(Gls)
2009–2010	Vancouver Whitecaps	30	(8)
2010–2011	West Bromwich Albion	0	(0)
2010	→ Exeter City (loan)	5	(0)
2010	→ Vancouver Whitecaps (loan)	11	(1)
2010	→ St Johnstone (loan)	11	(1)
2011–2012	St Johnstone	31	(2)
2012–2014	Stevenage	45	(7)
2013	→ Notts County (loan)	11	(2)
2014–2016	Crewe Alexandra	76	(16)
2016–2019	Dundee	38	(11)
2018	→ Falkirk (loan)	15	(0)
2019	Pacific FC	13	(3)
2020	Cavalry FC	9	(2)
2021	Visakha	17	(17)
2022–2024	Preah Khan Reach Svay Rieng	56	(56)
2024–2025	Chonburi	0	(0)
2024–2025	→ Nongbua Pitchaya (loan)	29	(6)
2025–2026	Bangkok	13	(1)
2026–	One Taguig	14	(3)

International career^{‡}
2005	Canada U16	2	(2)
2005	Canada U17	3	(1)
2006–2009	Canada U20	21	(1)
2008–2012	Canada U23	6	(1)
2010–2016	Canada	27	(3)
- * Club domestic league appearances and goals as of 09:08, 11 August 2025 (UTC) ‡ National team caps and goals as of November 11, 2016

Marcus Warren Haber (born January 11, 1989) is a Canadian professional soccer player who plays as a striker for Philippines Football League club One Taguig.

Haber began his career in the youth academies of Vancouver Selects and Dutch Eredivisie club FC Groningen. He returned to Canada in February 2009 to sign for Vancouver Whitecaps and in January 2010 signed for English Championship club West Bromwich Albion for an undisclosed fee. Over the following year he was loaned to Exeter City, Vancouver Whitecaps, and Scottish Premier League club St Johnstone, joining the latter permanently in July 2011. After one season, he moved to League One club Stevenage, spending two years there and also featuring on loan for Notts County. In July 2014, he signed for Crewe Alexandra, where he played for two seasons.

Haber joined Scottish Premiership club Dundee in October 2016 and spent the first half of the 2018–19 season on loan at Falkirk. In January 2019, he joined Pacific FC of the newly formed Canadian Premier League, transferring to league rivals Cavalry FC a year later. Haber spent the 2021 season with Cambodian Premier League club Visakha, before joining Preah Khan Reach Svay Rieng, scoring 74 goals in 71 appearances and winning a domestic double in his second season. He joined Thai League 2 club Chonburi in July 2024, spending the 2024–25 season on loan with Nongbua Pitchaya, before signing for Bangkok in July 2025. At international level, Haber has represented Canada from under-16 to under-23 level and earned 27 senior caps, scoring three goals.

== Early life ==
Born in Vancouver, British Columbia, Haber is the eldest of three children. He is of Austrian descent through his father. He began playing soccer at the age of five for Dunbar SA, while also playing baseball and basketball during his youth. He attended Lord Kitchener Elementary School and Lord Byng Secondary School in Vancouver.

== Club career ==
=== Early career ===
Haber joined Vancouver Selects in 2002, progressing through the youth academy and helping the team win a national championship in early 2006. Later that year, he played for the Whitecaps FC Reserves in the Pacific Coast Soccer League before moving to Europe, where he spent two seasons with the under-19 team of Dutch Eredivisie club FC Groningen. During his time at Groningen, he made over 20 appearances for the youth team and a further two for the reserves.

Haber joined English League One club Leeds United on trial, taking part in their pre-season tour to Ireland ahead of the 2008–09 season. He scored once in two appearances, and stayed with Leeds upon their return to England, with manager Simon Grayson "still showing interest" in signing him. However, no contract offer materialised and Haber began to search for another club. In August 2008, Haber trialled unsuccessfully with Hartlepool United, appearing in a pre-season friendly against York City. Later that month, he had another unsuccessful trial at Rotherham United. In September, he spent two weeks on trial at League Two club Gillingham, playing in reserve matches against Southampton and Crystal Palace, but was not offered a contract.

=== Vancouver Whitecaps ===
After an unsuccessful search for a club in Europe, Haber returned to Canada and subsequently signed for the Vancouver Whitecaps on February 11, 2009. He received both the 'Newcomer of the Year' and 'Fan's Favourite' awards following his first season with the club. Haber was one of seven USL First Division players to feature in every regular-season match for the club during the 2009 season. He scored his first goal for Vancouver on April 18, 2009 in a 2–1 away defeat to the Puerto Rico Islanders, earning a place in the USL-1 Team of the Week for Week Two. In the Nutrilite Canadian Championship, Haber scored the winning goal in a 2–0 away victory over Montreal Impact on May 20, 2009, scoring 33 seconds into the match to set a record for the quickest goal in the competition's history.

Haber was named in the Team of the Week for Week 14 following a goal and an assist in a 4–0 home victory over Minnesota Thunder on July 9, 2009. Vancouver finished the regular season in seventh place, securing a place in the play-offs. Haber scored headed goals in both legs of the play-off semi-final against Portland Timbers, helping his team progress to the USL-1 Championship Series final with a 5–4 aggregate victory. He also scored in the first leg of the final, as Vancouver were defeated 6–3 on aggregate by Canadian rivals Montreal Impact. At the conclusion of the season, Haber was awarded the USL First Division Rookie of the Year for 2009. He finished the season with 12 goals in 39 appearances.

=== West Bromwich Albion ===
In November 2009, Haber spent four days training with Championship club West Bromwich Albion. The trial proved successful and Haber signed for the club on January 12, 2010 for an undisclosed fee, having agreed personal terms and passed a medical examination. Upon joining, Haber stated the club had been clear in their intention to develop him as a young player.

==== Loan spells ====
Having made only two reserve appearances for West Brom due to multiple postponements caused by adverse weather conditions, Haber joined League One club Exeter City on a month-long loan on February 18, 2010 to gain first-team experience. He made his debut two days later in a 1–0 home defeat to Stockport County, coming on as a 60th-minute substitute in the match. He made five appearances during the loan agreement before returning to West Brom in March 2010.

Haber rejoined Vancouver Whitecaps on a two-month loan on April 9, 2010. West Brom stated that the move was intended to provide him with more game time, as international clearance delays and fixture postponements had limited his playing opportunities in England. During the loan, he made 15 appearances in all competitions, scoring twice.

=== St Johnstone ===
Ahead of the 2010–11 season, Haber joined Scottish Premier League club St Johnstone on a season-long loan. Manager Derek McInnes described him as "young, hungry, has real pace and keen to learn", noting that West Brom viewed the loan as an opportunity for regular first-team football. Haber made his competitive debut on August 14, 2010 in a 1–1 draw against Hearts, playing 72 minutes. He made 14 appearances and scored twice in the opening three months of the season, before suffering a ruptured anterior cruciate ligament in a 3–0 home defeat to Kilmarnock on November 6, 2010. The injury, sustained in what was described as an innocuous incident on a slick playing surface, required surgery and ruled him out for the remainder of the season.

Haber was released by West Brom on July 4, 2011, having made no first-team appearances for the club. He signed a one-year contract with St Johnstone on July 22, 2011 after a two-week trial with the club. Initially used mainly from the substitutes' bench during the opening months of the 2011–12 season, Haber scored his first goal of the campaign in a 3–1 victory over Hibernian on November 26, 2011. Haber made 34 appearances in all competitions, scoring twice, as St Johnstone finished sixth in the league.

=== Stevenage ===
Upon the expiry of his contract at St Johnstone, Haber signed a two-year contract with League One club Stevenage on a free transfer on July 4, 2012. He made his debut in a 3–1 home victory over AFC Wimbledon in the League Cup on August 14, 2012, providing two assists. His first goal for the club came in a 2–1 victory against Coventry City at the Ricoh Arena, scoring the decisive goal with a header in the 75th minute after coming on as a substitute. Haber made 46 appearances in all competitions during the 2012–13 season. In May 2013, he was placed on the transfer list by new manager Graham Westley, who stated that Haber was unlikely to play in the following season and would benefit from a move elsewhere.

Despite remaining on the transfer list, Haber featured in Stevenage's first three matches of the 2013–14 season, before joining fellow League One club Notts County on a three-month emergency loan on September 13, 2013. He scored twice in 11 appearances during the loan spell, which ended following his sending-off for an apparent elbow in a 1–1 draw away at Bradford City on November 26, 2013. He departed Stevenage upon the conclusion of his contract in June 2014.

=== Crewe Alexandra ===
Having spent pre-season ahead of the 2014–15 season on trial with Barnsley, Haber signed a two-year contract with League One club Crewe Alexandra on July 31, 2014. He scored his first goal for the club with a brace in a 5–2 home defeat to Rochdale on August 19, 2014. Haber finished his first season as Crewe's top goalscorer, scoring eight goals in 39 appearances as the club avoided relegation by finishing 20th in League One. He scored 10 goals in 43 appearances during the 2015–16 season, finishing as joint-top goalscorer for the club, although Crewe were relegated after finishing bottom of the league. He was released upon the expiry of his contract in May 2016.

=== Dundee ===
Without a club during the opening months of the 2016–17 season, Haber spent a week on trial with Scottish Premiership club Dundee in October 2016. He signed for the club on October 24, 2016 on a contract until the end of that season, with manager Paul Hartley highlighting his height, strength and penalty-box presence as attributes that offered a different option in attack. Haber made his debut two days later in a 2–0 home defeat to Partick Thistle and scored his first goal in a 2–0 victory against Motherwell on November 5, 2016. After scoring three goals in 11 appearances, Haber signed a new two-year contract with Dundee on January 19, 2017. He finished the season as the club's top goalscorer, with nine goals in 28 appearances, which included two late-season match-winners that contributed to Dundee securing their Premiership status.

Haber found himself out of the first team at the start of the 2017–18 season following the arrival of Sofien Moussa. Manager Neil McCann also noted that he and Haber had experienced a number of disagreements. Haber played a peripheral role throughout the season, scoring two goals in 13 appearances, with a knee injury limiting his involvement in the second half of the season. He joined Scottish Championship club Falkirk on a season-long loan on July 28, 2018, reuniting with manager Paul Hartley who had previously signed him for Dundee. Haber made 17 appearances without scoring during the first half of the 2018–19 season, after which Falkirk terminated the loan. Haber subsequently left Dundee by mutual consent in January 2019.

=== Pacific FC and Cavalry FC ===
Following his departure from Dundee, Haber returned to Canada and signed with newly formed Canadian Premier League club Pacific FC on January 9, 2019. He made his debut in the club's inaugural match, a 1–0 victory over HFX Wanderers FC, and scored his first goal for Pacific in a 2–2 draw with York 9 FC on May 18, 2019. A knee injury limited his playing time during the 2019 season, during which he made 15 appearances and scored four goals.

Ahead of the 2020 season, Haber signed with Canadian Premier League club Cavalry FC. He made his debut on August 13, 2020 in the opening-day 2–2 draw against Forge FC and scored his first goal two days later in a 2–0 victory over Valour FC. Haber scored twice in nine appearances during the shortened 2020 Canadian Premier League season, which was delayed due to the COVID-19 pandemic. Upon the conclusion of the season, Haber departed Cavalry by mutual consent, allowing him to pursue potential opportunities overseas.

=== Visakha and PKR Svay Rieng ===
Haber signed with Cambodian Premier League club Visakha on January 18, 2021. Haber scored his first goal for the club on July 3, 2021 in a 2–2 draw against Nagaworld FC. In the following match, he set a club record by scoring four goals in a 9–0 victory over Asia Euro United. Haber finished the season as Visakha's top scorer with 17 goals and 10 assists. He departed the club shortly after the season concluded.

Haber signed for fellow Cambodian Premier League club Preah Khan Reach Svay Rieng on January 16, 2022. He finished the 2022 season as the league's top scorer with 25 goals, registering 31 goals in 32 appearances across all competitions, and was named the league's Player of the Season. He signed a contract extension on January 20, 2023. During the 2023–24 season, Haber scored 43 goals in 39 appearances as PKR Svay Rieng secured the Cambodian Premier League title and the Hun Sen Cup. He won the Golden Boot with 31 league goals, was named Player of the Season, and included in the Cambodian Premier League Team of the Year.

=== Thailand ===
Upon the expiry of his contract with PKR Svay Rieng, Haber signed for Thai League 2 club Chonburi on July 2, 2024. Ahead of the 2024–25 season, Chonburi signed Derley as their sixth designated foreign player, exceeding the quota of five permitted per match. Consequently, Haber was loaned to Thai League 1 club Nongbua Pitchaya on August 14, 2024, without making any first-team appearances for Chonburi. He scored eight goals in 34 appearances during the loan, including a hat-trick in a 3–2 victory against Uthai Thani on September 23, 2024. Haber left Chonburi at the end of the season and joined Thai League 2 club Bangkok in July 2025.

== International career ==
Haber represented Canada at youth levels from under-16 to under-23, scoring five goals in 32 appearances across all age groups. He made his debut for the senior team in a 2–2 friendly against Ukraine at the Valeriy Lobanovskyi Dynamo Stadium on October 8, 2010, coming on as a 73rd-minute substitute for Olivier Occéan. Haber earned his first start for Canada against Japan on March 22, 2013, during which he scored his first senior international goal with a second-half header in a 2–1 defeat. He was named in Canada's squads for the 2013 and 2015 CONCACAF Gold Cups. Between 2010 and 2016, Haber earned 27 caps and scored three goals for the national team.

== Style of play ==
Primarily deployed as a striker, Haber has been described as an "archetypal target man", using his height and physical presence to win aerial duels and hold up play. During his time in Cambodia, his heading ability earned him the nickname "King of the Header".

== Personal life ==
Haber enjoys listening to and producing hip hop music in his spare time and has an interest in fashion.

== Career statistics ==
As of match played April 30, 2025

=== Club ===
Appearances and goals by club, season and competition
Club	Season	League			National cup (Note: Includes Canadian Championship, FA Cup, Hun Sen Cup, Scottish Cup, Thai FA Cup)		League cup (Note: Includes Cambodian League Cup, Football League Cup, Scottish League Cup, Thai League Cup)		Other		Total	
Club	Season	Division	Apps	Goals	Apps	Goals	Apps	Goals	Apps	Goals	Apps	Goals
Vancouver Whitecaps	2009	USL First Division	30	8	3	1	0	0	6 (Note: Appearances in 2009 USL First Division play-offs)	3	39	12
West Bromwich Albion	2009–10	Premier League	0	0	0	0	0	0	0	0	0	0
West Bromwich Albion	2010–11	Premier League	0	0	0	0	0	0	0	0	0	0
West Bromwich Albion	Total		0	0	0	0	0	0	0	0	0	0
Exeter City (loan)	2009–10	League One	5	0	0	0	0	0	0	0	5	0
Vancouver Whitecaps (loan)	2010	USSF Division 2	11	1	4	1	0	0	0	0	15	2
St Johnstone (loan)	2010–11	Scottish Premier League	11	1	0	0	3	1	0	0	14	2
St Johnstone	2011–12	Scottish Premier League	31	2	2	0	1	0	0	0	34	2
Stevenage	2012–13	League One	42	7	1	0	2	0	1 (Note: Appearance in Football League Trophy)	0	46	7
Stevenage	2013–14	League One	3	0	1	0	1	0	0	0	5	0
Stevenage	Total		45	7	2	0	3	0	1	0	51	7
Notts County (loan)	2013–14	League One	11	2	0	0	0	0	0	0	11	2
Crewe Alexandra	2014–15	League One	36	7	1	0	2	1	0	0	39	8
Crewe Alexandra	2015–16	League One	40	9	1	0	1	0	1	1	43	10
Crewe Alexandra	Total		76	16	2	0	3	1	1	1	82	18
Dundee	2016–17	Scottish Premiership	27	9	1	0	0	0	0	0	28	9
Dundee	2017–18	Scottish Premiership	11	2	0	0	2	0	0	0	13	2
Dundee	Total		38	11	1	0	2	0	0	0	41	11
Falkirk (loan)	2018–19	Scottish Championship	15	0	0	0	1	0	1 (Note: Appearance in Scottish Challenge Cup)	0	17	0
Pacific FC	2019	Canadian Premier League	13	3	2	1	0	0	0	0	15	4
Cavalry FC	2020	Canadian Premier League	9	2	0	0	0	0	0	0	9	2
Visakha	2021	Cambodian Premier League	17	17	0	0	0	0	0	0	17	17
PKR Svay Rieng	2022	Cambodian Premier League	27	25	0	0	5	6	0	0	32	31
PKR Svay Rieng	2023–24	Cambodian Premier League	29	31	4	2	6	10	0	0	39	43
PKR Svay Rieng	Total		56	56	4	2	11	16	0	0	71	74
Chonburi	2024–25	Thai League 2	0	0	0	0	0	0	0	0	0	0
Nongbua Pitchaya (loan)	2024–25	Thai League 1	29	6	1	1	4	1	0	0	34	8
Bangkok	2025–26	Thai League 2	13	1	0	0	1	0	0	0	14	1
One Taguig	2025–26	Philippines Football League	14	3	0	0	0	0	0	0	14	3
Career total			424	136	21	6	29	19	9	4	483	165

=== International ===
National team	Season	Caps	Goals
Canada	2010	1	0
Canada	2011	1	0
Canada	2012	1	0
Canada	2013	7	1
Canada	2014	2	0
Canada	2015	9	1
Canada	2016	6	1
Total		27	3

=== International goals ===
Scores and results list Canada's goal tally first.

#	Date	Venue	Cap	Opponent	Score	Result	Competition
1	March 22, 2013	Khalifa International Stadium, Doha, Qatar	4	Japan	1–1	1–2	Friendly
2	March 27, 2015	Lockhart Stadium, Fort Lauderdale, United States	13	Guatemala	1–0	1–0	Friendly
3	October 6, 2016	Stade de Marrakech, Marrakesh, Morocco	25	Mauritania	3–0	4–0	Friendly

== Honours ==
Svay Rieng

- Cambodian Premier League: 2023–24
- Hun Sen Cup: 2023–24

Individual

- USL First Division Rookie of the Year: 2009
- Cambodian Premier League Golden Boot: 2022, 2023–24
- Cambodian Premier League Player Of The Season: 2022, 2023–24
