= Vancouver Whitecaps FC U-23 =

Soccer team

- Full name: Vancouver Whitecaps FC U-23
- Nickname: The Caps
- Founded: 2005
- Dissolved: 2014
- Stadium: Thunderbird Stadium
- Capacity: 3,500
- Owner: Greg Kerfoot
- Head Coach: Nick Dasovic
- League: Premier Development League
Home colours	Away colours

Vancouver Whitecaps FC U-23, formerly known as Whitecaps FC Reserves, was a Canadian soccer team based in Vancouver, British Columbia, Canada. Although founded in 2005 as part of the development system for the Vancouver Whitecaps USL First Division franchise, beginning in 2011 they became part of the development system for Major League Soccer's Vancouver Whitecaps FC. The team played in the Premier Development League (PDL), the fourth tier of the American Soccer Pyramid, in the Northwest Division of the Western Conference.

The team played its home games at Thunderbird Stadium. The team's colours were blue and white.

== History ==
=== Pacific Coast Soccer League ===
Vancouver Whitecaps FC U-23 began their competitive life as Whitecaps FC Reserves in the Pacific Coast Soccer League in 2005, and were immediately competitive. As the official development team of the Vancouver Whitecaps USL First Division club, they had the pick of the local youth soccer talent, and this translated to results on the field. They won the North Division title in their freshman season with a 10–2–4 record, finishing three points clear of second place Hibernian & Caledonian. However, they lost the championship title match against Victoria United, and had to be content with second place. Andrew Corrazza was Whitecaps' top scorer, tallying 15 goals for the season.

The PCSL reverted to a single-table format in 2006, but the change in structure did not distract the Whitecaps, who took their first league championship title with an 11–2–1 record, finishing four points clear of FK Pacific in second place and Vancouver Thunderbirds in third.

The team spent the 2007 season in hiatus, preparing for their PDL debut in 2008. In joining the PDL in 2008, the Whitecaps became the first team to make the PCSL to PDL jump.

=== USL Premier Development League ===
Original logo of the USL-affiliated Whitecaps

Vancouver's first season in the PDL was an impressive one; they rattled off three wins out of the gate, including an impressive 4–1 victory over 2007 divisional champions BYU Cougars. Their 4–0 loss to Tacoma Tide at the beginning of June would prove to be costly at the end of the season, but despite this slight stutter the Whitecaps continued to post impressive results. They outclassed local rivals Abbotsford Rangers 4–1, exacted revenge on Tacoma with a 5–1 thumping that included a hat-trick from striker Randy Edwini-Bonsu, put another five past Cascade Surge in early July, and knocked off title contenders Yakima Reds 4–1 on the road. At this point the divisional title looked to be theirs for the taking, but two surprising defeats in their last three league games – 0–3 at Spokane Shadow and then 0–1 at Ogden Outlaws in the final game of the season – allowed Tacoma to pip them at the post and take the divisional title on goal difference. Nevertheless, Vancouver travelled to Fresno for the Western Conference playoffs, where they faced the San Fernando Valley Quakes in the semi-final, who they beat 3–1 in extra time, after scoring an equalizer with virtually the last kick of normal time thanks to Randy Edwini-Bonsu. They comfortably dispatched Tacoma Tide 4–1 to take the Western Conference title with another brace from Edwini-Bonsu, and travelled to Ontario to take on Central Conference champions Thunder Bay Chill for a place in the PDL Championship game. The first ever all-Canadian semi final went the way of the Chill, who scored a last minute winner to take the game 2–1 (and would eventually go on to win the national title). For the Whitecaps, however, it was a positive debut season in the PDL, and the future looks bright. The prolific Randy Edwini-Bonsu was top scorer for the season, with nine goals, while Gagandeep Dosanjh and Alex Semenets contributed 8 assists each.

Having lost many of their best players – including Luca Bellisomo, Randy Edwini-Bonsu, Ethan Gage, Navid Mashinchi, Dever Orgill, Admir Salihovic, Mason Trafford and Simon Thomas – to the senior Whitecaps roster at the end of 2008, the Residency Class of 2009 did not fare as well in the PDL. Despite playing their first six regular season games at home at Simon Fraser University, the Caps could only register two wins, a 2–1 win over fellow Canucks Abbotsford Mariners, and an admittedly very impressive 6–0 hammering of Spokane Shadow in which Coulton Jackson scored twice. The bad run of form continued when they hit the road, losing four of their five trips around the Pacific Northwest, including a demoralizing 4–0 drubbing at the hands of eventual divisional champions Kitsap Pumas in mid-June. A late rally in July saw the Caps enjoy their only unbeaten streak of the season, a 4-game stand that included a 6–0 battering of the Yakima Reds thanks to goals from senior side loanees Randy Edwini-Bonsu, Dever Orgill and Kenold Versailles. Unfortunately, a 4–0 loss to their local rivals Victoria Highlanders on the last day of the season left the Caps stuck mid-table in sixth place, out of the playoffs and with some re-building to do. Gagandeep Dosanjh was the team's top scorer with 4 goals, while Russell Teibert contributed 3 assists.

On November 21, 2014, the Whitecaps announced the formation on the Whitecaps FC 2 United Soccer League team. The U23 team was disbanded and its staff was moved to the new team.

== Players ==
=== Notable former players ===
This list of notable former players comprises players who went on to play professional soccer after playing for the team in the Premier Development League, or those who previously played professionally before joining the team.

- (Morocco) Mehdi Ballouchy
- (Bolivia) Vicente Arze
- (Canada) Tyler Baldock
- (Canada) Luca Bellisomo
- (Canada) Brandon Bonifacio
- (Saint Vincent and the Grenadines) Wesley Charles
- (Canada) Gordon Chin
- (Canada) Jeff Clarke
- (Canada) Michael D'Agostino
- (Canada) Srdjan Djekanovic
- (Canada) Randy Edwini-Bonsu
- (Canada) Ben Fisk-Routledge
- (Canada) Ethan Gage
- (Jamaica) Jhamie Hyde
- (Canada) Callum Irving
- (Saint Vincent and the Grenadines) Marlon James
- (Canada) Diaz Kambere
- (Canada) Stefan Leslie
- (Iran) Navid Mashinchi
- (Jamaica) Dever Orgill
- (Canada) Dan Pelc
- (Canada) Kyle Porter
- (Bosnia and Herzegovina) Admir Salihovic
- (Canada) Alex Semenets
- (Jamaica) Keithy Simpson
- (Canada) Adam Straith
- (Canada) Simon Thomas
- (Canada) Russell Teibert
- (Canada) Mason Trafford
- (Haiti) Kenold Versailles
- (United States) Mason Webb
- (United States) Nick Webb

== Year-by-year ==
Year	Division	League	Regular season	Playoffs	Open Canada Cup
1995	4	PCSL	3rd		N/A
1996	4	PCSL	5th		N/A
2005	4	PCSL	1st, North	Finalist	did not participate
2006	4	PCSL	1st		did not participate
2007	On Hiatus				
2008	4	USL PDL	2nd, Northwest	National Semifinals	N/A
2009	4	USL PDL	6th, Northwest	did not qualify	N/A
2010	4	USL PDL	6th, Northwest	did not qualify	N/A
2011	4	USL PDL	3rd, Northwest	did not qualify	N/A
2012	4	USL PDL	5th, Northwest	did not qualify	N/A
2013	4	USL PDL	3rd, Northwest	Divisional Playoffs	N/A
2014	4	USL PDL	3rd, Northwest	Conference Semifinals	N/A

== Honours ==
- USL PDL Western Conference Champions 2008
- PCSL Champions 2006
- PCSL North Division Champions 2006
- 2012 Juan de Fuca Plate Champions
- 2013 Juan de Fuca Plate Champions

== Head coaches ==
- (Germany) Thomas Niendorf (2008–2009)
- (Canada) Colin Miller (2010)
- (England) Craig Dalrymple (2010, 2012)
- (Netherlands) Richard Grootscholten (2010–2012)
- (Scotland) Stuart Neely (2013)
- (Canada) Niall Thompson (2014)

== Stadiums ==
- Percy Perry Stadium; Coquitlam, British Columbia (2006)
- Terry Fox Field at Simon Fraser University; Burnaby, British Columbia (2008–2011)
- Swangard Stadium; Burnaby, British Columbia (2010, 2012)
- Empire Field; Vancouver, British Columbia (2011)
- Hugh Boyd Stadium; Vancouver, British Columbia (2011) 1 game
- Thunderbird Stadium; Vancouver, British Columbia (2013)

== Average attendance ==
Attendance stats are calculated by averaging each team's self-reported home attendances from the historical match archive at https://web.archive.org/web/20100105175057/http://www.uslsoccer.com/history/index_E.html.

- 2008: 96
- 2009: 79
- 2010: 129
- 2011: 254
- 2012: 108
- 2013: 81
- 2014: 95

== See also ==
- Reserve team football
