= List of Canadian Premier League stadiums =

List of Canadian Premier League stadiums (Canada)
Current Canadian Premier League stadiums

The Canadian Premier League (CPL) is the top-division Canadian men's professional soccer league. In the 2026 season, the league will consist of eight teams playing in eight stadiums. The CPL primarily uses multi-purpose stadiums.

== Current primary stadiums ==
Image	Stadium	Club	Location	First CPL year	Capacity	Opened	Surface	Coordinates	Ref(s)
	ATCO Field	Cavalry FC	Foothills County, Alberta	2019	6,000	1976	Grass	50°53′06″N 114°06′02″W	
	Hamilton Stadium (Note: Known as "Tim Hortons Field" from the 2019 season until the 2024 season.)	Forge FC	Hamilton, Ontario	2019	23,218	2014	Artificial turf	43°15′9.26″N 79°49′48.89″W	
	Stade Boréale	FC Supra du Québec	Laval, Quebec	2026	5,581	2005	Artificial turf	45°34′27″N 73°42′19″W	
	Starlight Stadium (Note: Known as "Westhills Stadium" in the 2019 and 2020 seasons.)	Pacific FC	Langford, British Columbia	2019	6,000	2009	FieldTurf	48°26′35″N 123°31′10″W	
	TD Place Stadium	Atlético Ottawa	Ottawa, Ontario	2020	24,000	1908	FieldTurf	45°23′53.44″N 75°41′1.14″W	
	Wanderers Grounds	HFX Wanderers	Halifax, Nova Scotia	2019	7,244	2018	Grass	44.6444°N 63.5836°W	
	Willoughby Community Park	Vancouver FC	Langley, British Columbia	2023	6,560	2023	Artificial turf	49.1440°N 122.6656°W	
	York Lions Stadium	Inter Toronto FC	Toronto, Ontario	2019	4,000	2015	Artificial turf	43.77467°N 79.50677°W	

== Former primary stadiums ==
Image	Stadium	Club	Location	Years	Capacity	Opened	Surface	Coordinates	Ref(s)
	Clarke Stadium	FC Edmonton	Edmonton, Alberta	2019–2022	5,100	1938	Artificial turf	53°33′26″N 113°28′42″W	
	Princess Auto Stadium (Note: Known as "IG Field" from the 2019 season until the 2024 season.)	Valour FC	Winnipeg, Manitoba	2019–2025	32,343	2013	FieldTurf Revolution	49°48′28″N 97°8′35″W	

== Neutral site and secondary stadiums ==
Stadium	Location	Surface	Events	Ref(s)
Apple Bowl	Kelowna, British Columbia	Grass	Hosted one Vancouver FC home game in 2024 as part of the "CPL On Tour" series.	
CEPSUM	Montreal, Quebec	Artificial turf	Hosted two FC Supra du Québec home games in 2026.	
Royal Athletic Park	Victoria, British Columbia	Grass	Hosted one Pacific FC home game in 2025 and four in 2026.	
Telus Stadium	Quebec City, Quebec	Artificial turf	Hosted one York United FC home game in 2025 as part of the "CPL On Tour" series, as well as one FC Supra du Québec home game in 2026.	
UPEI Alumni Field	Charlottetown, Prince Edward Island	Artificial turf	Hosted the entire 2020 CPL season.	

== See also ==
- List of soccer stadiums in Canada
- List of Major League Soccer stadiums
- List of Canadian Football League stadiums
