= Starfire Sports =

Stadium and sports facility in Tukwila, Washington, U.S.

Coordinates: 47°28′11″N 122°14′54″W

Starfire Sports Stadium
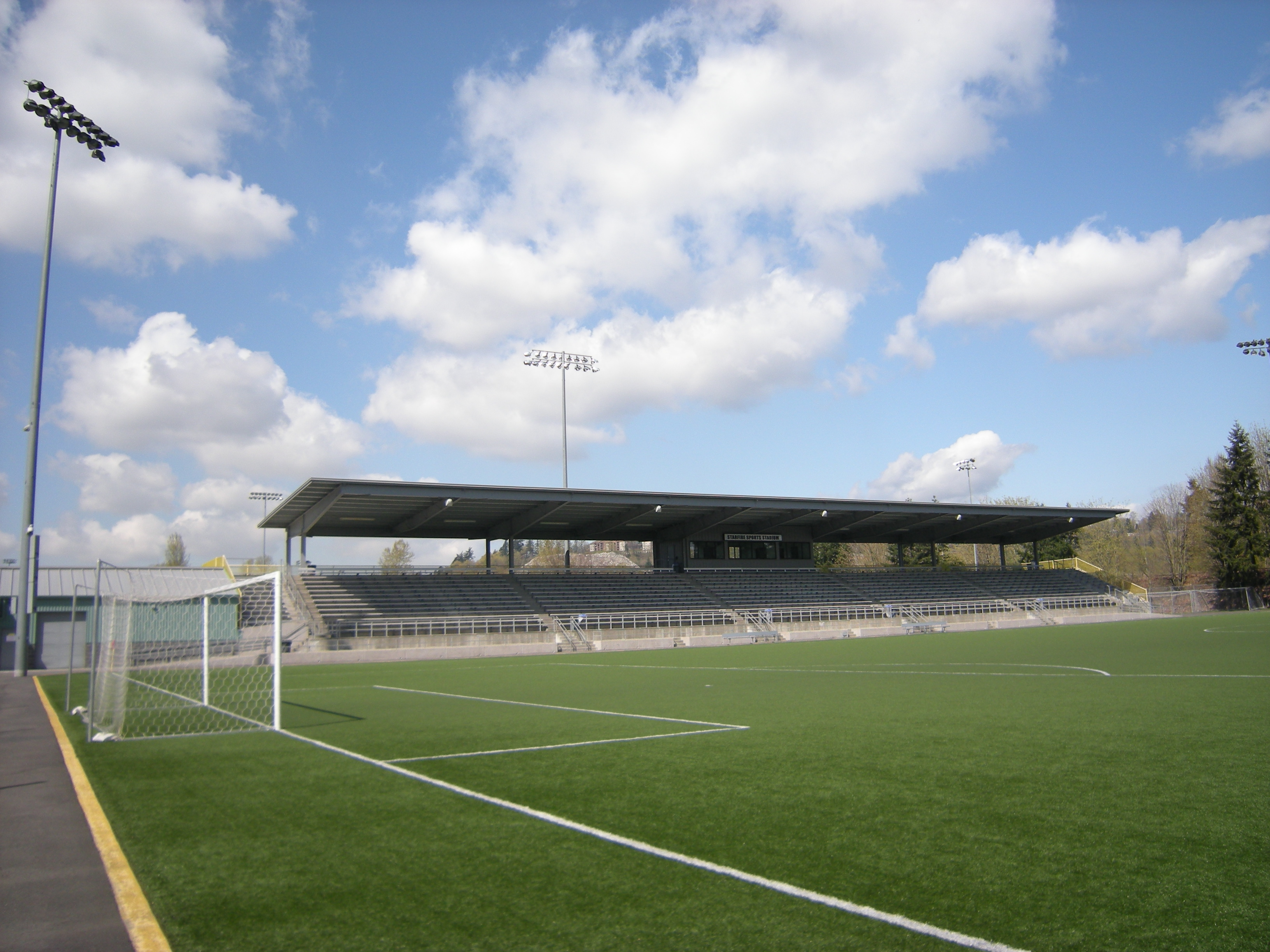
- The stadium's playing field pictured in 2009
- Interactive map of Starfire Sports Stadium
- Former names: Fort Dent Park; Starfire Sporting Complex; Starfire Sports Complex
- Location: 6840 Fort Dent Way; Tukwila, Washington, U.S.
- Owner: Starfire Sports
- Operator: Starfire Sports
- Capacity: 4,500 (main stadium)
- Surface: 5 grass fields 7 outdoor FieldTurf fields (inc. stadium); 2 indoor FieldTurf fields

Construction
- Groundbreaking: June 20, 2003
- Opened: April 23, 2005
- Cost: $10 million USD
- Architect: HOK Sport

Tenant
- Seattle Sounders Women (WPSL) (2005–2019); FK Pacific (PCSL) (2005–2007); Hibernian & Caledonian (PCSL) (2005–2006); Seattle Sounders (USL-1) (2008); Seattle Sounders FC (MLS) (select matches, 2009–present); Tacoma Stars (PASL) (2011–2012); Seattle Reign FC (NWSL) (2013); Tacoma Defiance (MLSNP) (2015–2017, 2022–present); OSA Seattle FC (NPSL) (2015, 2017–present); OSA XF (WPSL) (2022–present); Seattle Seawolves (MLR) (2018–present)

Starfire Sports is a multi-purpose stadium and sporting facility in Tukwila, Washington, United States. It is located on the banks of the Green River, just south of Seattle. The stadium is operated by the nonprofit corporation Starfire Sports and is home to several soccer and rugby teams. At the time of its opening, CEO Chris Slatt claimed it was "the largest synthetic-turf soccer complex in the U.S."

From 2008 to 2024, Seattle Sounders FC of Major League Soccer has had offices and training facilities at the complex, whose main stadium hosted the Sounders' second-division incarnation in 2008 and has since staged the team's Lamar Hunt U.S. Open Cup matches. The Sounders' affiliate team, the Tacoma Defiance, played at Starfire from 2015 to 2017 and has returned for select games starting in 2022. The Sounders vacated the Starfire complex in favor of a new facility at Longacres in nearby Renton, Washington, which opened in 2024.

Starting in February 2023, Seattle-based Seattle Reign FC of the National Women's Soccer League will use the Starfire complex for training facilities as the complex's primary tenant, having previously played home games there for their 2013 season.

The Seattle franchise of Major League Rugby, the Seattle Seawolves, began play at Starfire Sports in spring 2018.

== History ==
The site was formerly Fort Dent Park, operated by King County. In addition to the existing grass soccer fields, the park included a cricket pitch and softball fields in the areas now occupied by artificial-surface soccer fields. Severe budget cuts in 2002 led the county to schedule the closing of this park, among others, at the end of the year; however, parks located within municipal boundaries were offered to those cities. That offer sparked the formation of Starfire Sports by Slatt, Steve Beck, and Mark Bickham, who negotiated a 40-year lease with Tukwila to allow them to build and operate the complex. The deal would relieve the city of an estimated $500,000 in annual maintenance costs which would likely have caused it to refuse the county's offer had Starfire not stepped in. Starfire planned to cover operating and maintenance costs through user fees and advertising banners and hopes to retire the $10 million construction costs over the course of several years.

The original plan for the facility was to build a 2,500-seat stadium that could host the Seattle Sounders, then a second-division team; the Sounders requested a stadium with at least 5,000 seats. New construction included four lighted outdoor soccer fields with FieldTurf, including the stadium with its 2000-seat grandstand, along with the indoor facility.

Beginning in summer 2004, English Premier League powerhouse Manchester United offered training at Starfire as part of their Soccer Schools program. This came to an end in December 2007. In the late 2000s, the complex was proposed as the site of a larger 28,000-seat venue that would host a Major League Soccer expansion team. Starfire was instead chosen as the training grounds for the expansion team awarded to Seattle Sounders FC.

The city of Tukwila still maintains a wooded part of the 54-acre (220,000 m^{2}) site as a public park. An expansion was unanimously approved by city leaders in a public hearing at the beginning of 2008 for the offices and training facilities of Seattle Sounders FC. The team's practice fields replaced four existing softball fields on the campus.

== Facilities ==
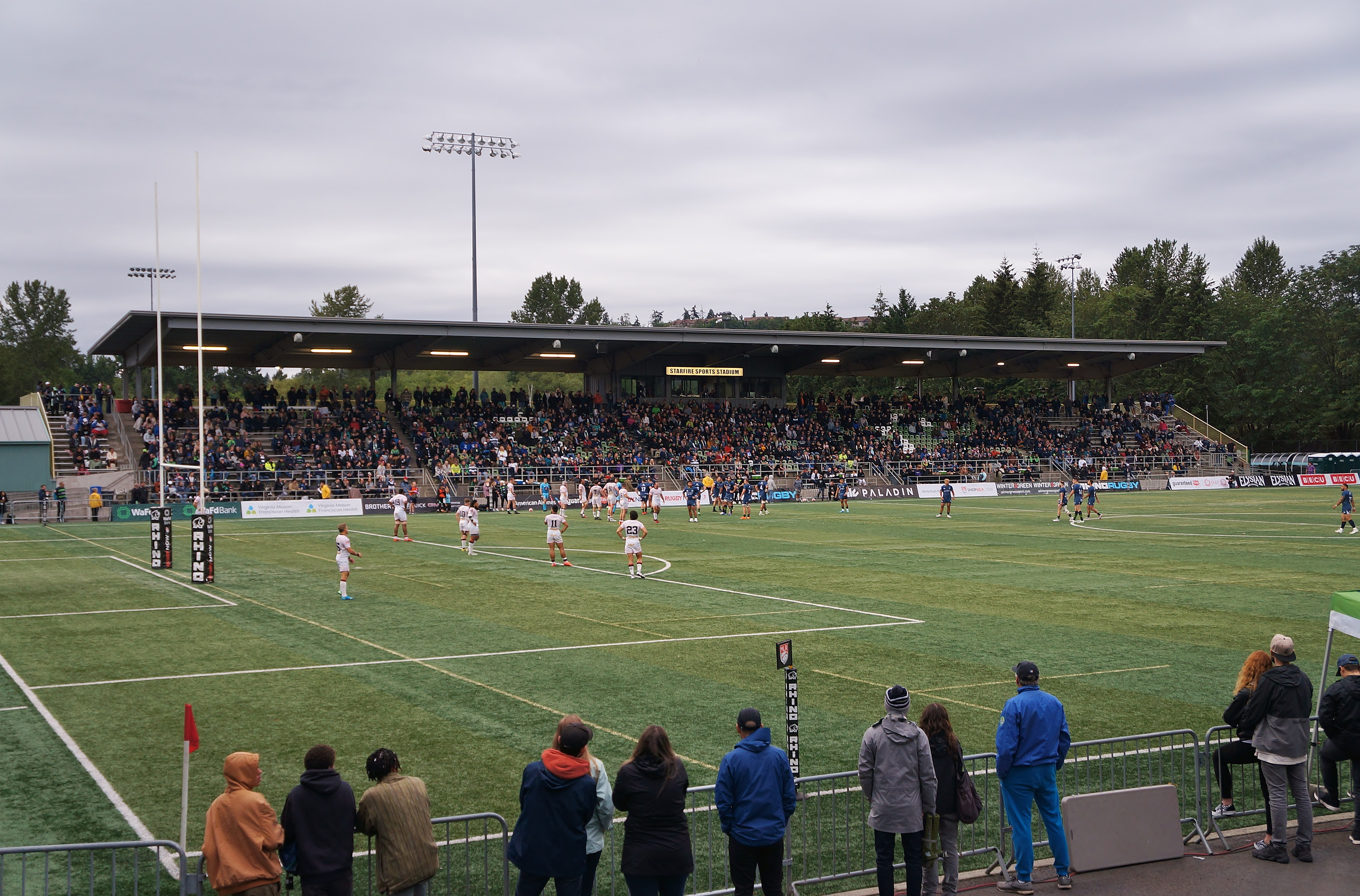
Seattle Seawolves vs San Diego Legion during the 2022 MLR Playoffs

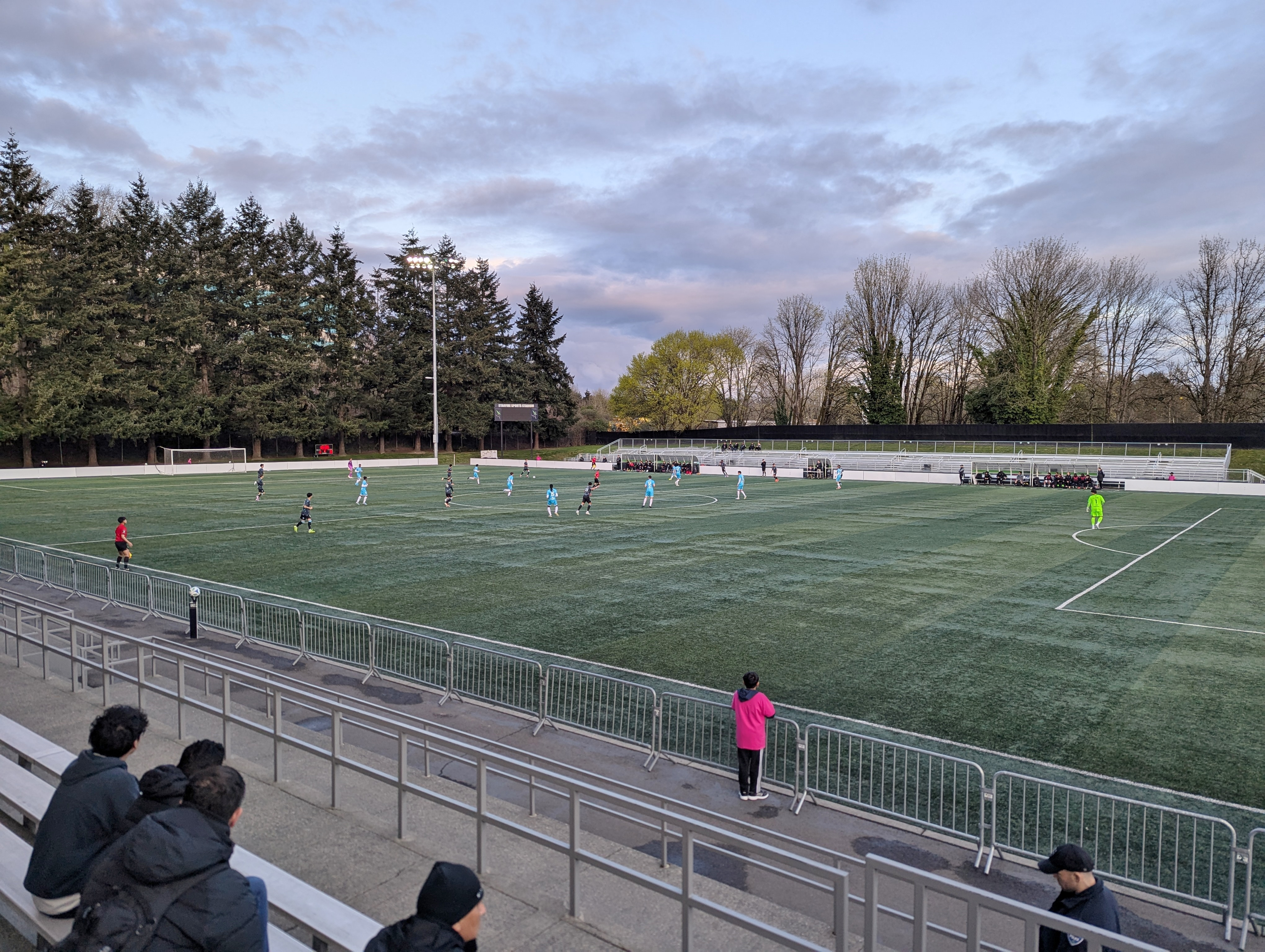
A 2025 U.S. Open Cup match hosted by the Tacoma Defiance against Spokane Velocity FC at Starfire Sports in Tukwila, Washington.

Starfire features fields for indoor and outdoor soccer, and occasionally rugby union games, as well as a 4,500-seat soccer stadium. In 2004, the stadium field became only the eighth American artificial-surface pitch to earn "recommended" status by FIFA and was thereby sanctioned for international play.

The complex has an indoor facility which has two indoor soccer FieldTurf fields. It also hosts administrative offices, a Mad Pizza restaurant, and a game room for children.

The expansion undertaken by the complex in 2008 also included new fields along with a workout and fitness area for the Sounders FC, as well as offices for the coaching and technical staff. To retain its community-based programs and accessibility, these areas and the fields have some public access. The team opened part of its training sessions to the public and allowed fans to greet players on walks between the training facility and practice fields. During the Copa América Centenario in 2016, temporary windscreens and privacy barriers were installed for visiting national teams, including Argentina.

== Tenants and events ==
The complex's main stadium, which seats 4,500 spectators, has been used by several professional soccer teams and for other sports. Among them were the USL incarnation of the Seattle Sounders, Seattle Reign FC of the NWSL, Seattle Sounders Women of the W-League, As of 2023, it hosts Seattle Sounders FC of Major League Soccer for US Open Cup matches, Tacoma Defiance of MLS Next Pro, and the Seattle Seawolves of Major League Rugby. It was also the home of Hibernian and Caledonian F.C. and FK Pacific of the Pacific Coast Soccer League. Additionally, the complex hosts the annual All Nations Cup, played by local teams representing their nationalities.

Starfire hosted the 2023 USL League Two Final between Ballard FC and Lionsbridge FC, which was played on August 5, 2023, in front of 3,416 spectators. Ballard FC won 2–1.

=== International rugby ===
Date	Teams	Competition	Attendance
March 2, 2019	United States 25–32 Uruguay	2019 Americas Rugby Championship	―
March 8, 2019	United States 30–25 Canada	2019 Americas Rugby Championship	―
