= Adam Loga =

Canadian soccer coach and player (born 1987)

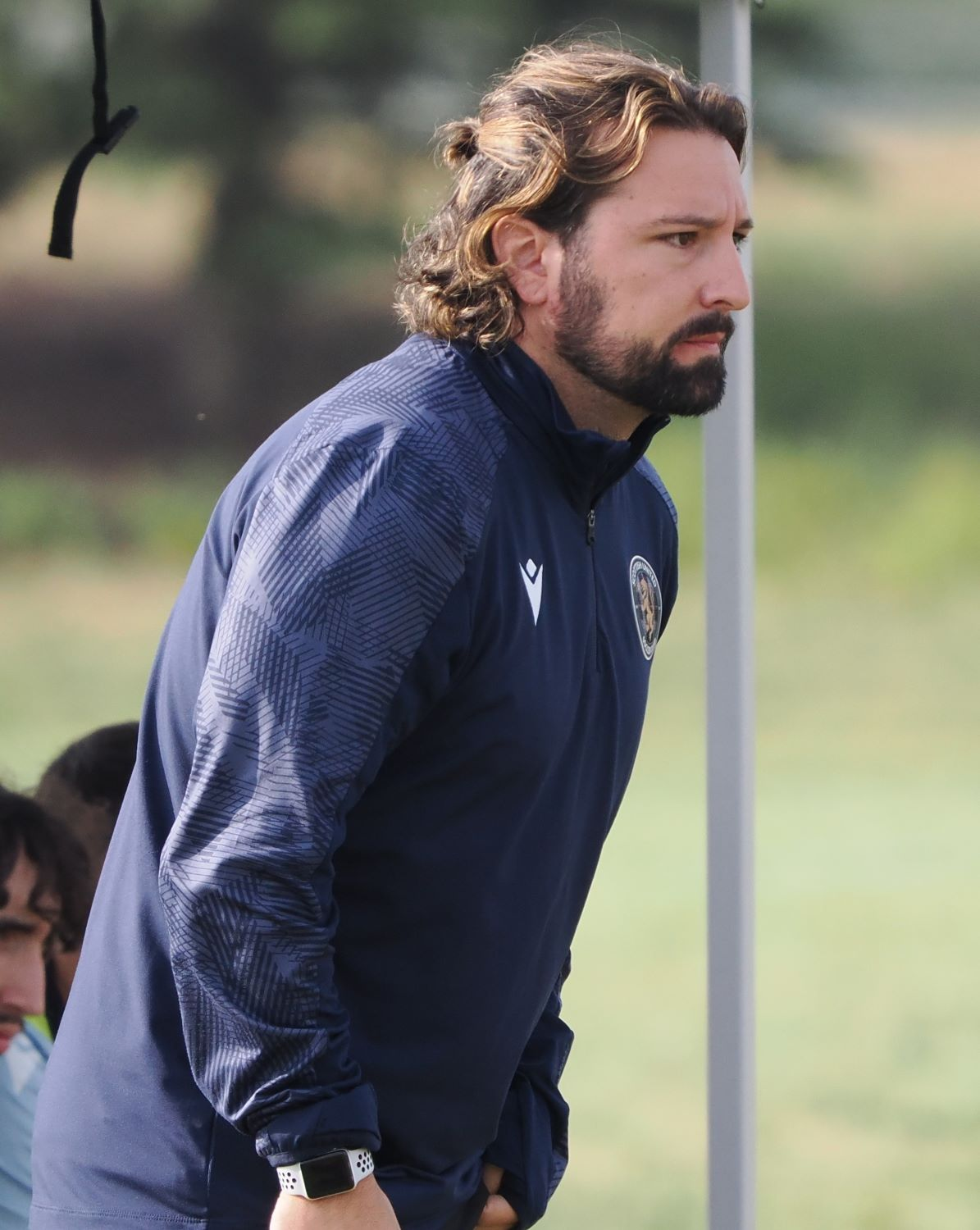
- Loga with Edmonton Scottish in 2023

Personal information
- Full name: Adam Loga
- Date of birth: March 21, 1987 (age 39)
- Place of birth: Edmonton, Alberta, Canada
- Height: 5 ft 9 in (1.75 m)
- Position: Midfielder

College career
Years	Team	Apps	(Gls)
2008	Bryan Lions		
2010–2013	Northwest Eagles		

Senior career*
Years	Team	Apps	(Gls)
2004	Edmonton Aviators		
2004–2006	Santiago Morning		
2008	PSSA Rapids		
2009	C.D. Fuerte Aguilares		

Managerial career
- 2015: Mount Royal Cougars (assistant)
- 2016–: MacEwan Griffins
- 2023–2025: Edmonton Scottish
- * Club domestic league appearances and goals

Adam Loga (born March 21, 1987) is a Canadian former soccer midfielder. He served as general manager for Edmonton Scottish's League1 Alberta teams, and holds head coaching roles with both the MacEwan Griffins varsity men's soccer team in U Sports and the Whitecaps FC BMO Academy Centre in Edmonton.

== College career ==
Loga played for the Bryan Lions during the 2008 season, contributing to the team ending their AAC regular season as the #1 seed before being eliminated in the conference playoffs.

After a year abroad in El Salvador, Loga joined the Northwest Eagles, where he would play from 2010 to 2011, and again in 2013. During his time there, he earned accolades including being named a 2011 All-American Scholar Athlete and receiving Academic All-Conference honors in 2010, 2011, and 2013. He was also named to the First Team All-Conference in 2013.

== Club career ==
After a brief training spell with the Edmonton Aviators, Loga began his senior career with Santiago Morning in Chile in 2004, playing there until 2006.

In 2007, Loga played for the PSSA Rapids before going on to join C.D. Fuerte Aguilares on a short stint in El Salvador in 2009.

== Coaching career ==
Loga served as an Assistant Men's Soccer Coach at Mount Royal Cougars in 2015, before being named the Head Coach for the MacEwan Griffins at MacEwan University in 2016.

In 2023, Loga took the helm as the head coach for the Edmonton Scottish men's soccer team for its League1 Exhibition Series. For the 2024 season, he was promoted to general manager of the club's League1 squads, where he oversaw and won both the men's Supporters' Shield and League Cup double, in addition to their berth in the 2025 Canadian Championship.
