= Victoria Highlanders FC (women) =

Canadian women's soccer team

- Full name: Victoria Highlanders Football Club
- Nicknames: Women Highlanders; Peninsula CO-OP Highlanders
- Founded: 2001
- Stadium: Centennial Stadium
- Head coach: Neil Sedgwick
- 2023: L1BC, 7th Playoffs, DNQ

Victoria Highlanders FC is a Canadian women's soccer team based in Victoria, British Columbia.

The team was founded in 2001 as the Victoria Stars FC. In 2010, the team was acquired by the Victoria Highlanders and re-branded to serve as their women's team. In 2012, they became known as the Peninsula Co-Op Women's Soccer Highlanders. The team was dissolved after the 2014 season. In 2021, the women's team was re-founded following a merger with Vancouver Island FC.

== History ==
=== Victoria Stars FC ===
Victoria Stars logo

Victoria Stars FC was founded as a women's soccer club in 2001. The Stars were operated by the Victoria Women's Soccer Society and their team colours were red and white. Playing in the Pacific Coast Soccer League Women's Premier Division they earned their first victory in club history on May 27, 2001, in their home opener against the Kelowna Predators in front of 200 fans. Ahead of the 2002 playoffs, the Stars played a friendly against the Chinese Taipei U19 team, who were preparing for the 2002 FIFA U-19 Women's World Championship, which was hosted in Canada, ultimately losing 2–0. They qualified for the playoffs for the first time in their second season, but lost both the semi-final and 3rd place match. In 2004, the Stars advanced to the playoff finals, but were defeated finishing in second. However, they were able to win the League Cup tournament (Kevin McAdams Memorial Cup) in 2004. In 2005, they captured their first regular season title (winning the Jacques Moon Memorial League Cup), but once again lost in the Playoff Championship final, losing to Hibernian & Caledonian Saints FC by a score of 3–0. However, they still managed to complete a double as they the League Cup winners in 2005. In 2008, the Stars once again won the League Regular Season title and also captured their first Playoff Championship, winning the Dave Fryatt Challenge Cup.

=== Acquisition by Victoria Highlanders ===
Highlanders logo from 2010 to 2014

Ahead of the 2010 season, the Victoria Highlanders adopted the Stars, re-branding them as the Highlanders. The Highlanders had previously announced interest in operating a women's club in the future, however, with the opportunity to save the Stars, they made the foray a little earlier than they anticipated. They played in the PCSL in 2010, finishing in second place.

In 2011, they decided to move up to the USL W-League, the second tier of women's soccer in the United States and Canada. They would also field a reserve U20 squad in the USL Super 20 League. They made their W-League debut on May 14, 2011, against the Seattle Sounders Women.

=== Peninsula Co-op ===

In early 2012, the club announced that Peninsula Co-Op would become the Presenting Partner of the women's team, with the team being re-branded as Peninsula Co-Op Women's Soccer, due to the high costs (particularly travel costs) associated with running the club in the W-League, as they only averaged approximately 200 fans per home game in 2011, although the Highlanders would continue to be the operators of the team despite the name change. The team would also change their colours from the Highlanders black and gold to the Peninsula Co-Op red and white, although they would still wear the Highlanders logo on their jersey along with the Peninsula logo. In 2013, the W-League became the top level of women's soccer in North America, following the folding of the WPS at the end of 2012. They opened the 2012 season with a 3–2 victory over their local rivals, the Vancouver Whitecaps.

Following a second consecutive poor season in the W-League, they decided to leave the W-League and return to the PCSL for 2013 (the Vancouver Whitecaps also dropped down to the PCSL for 2013), with the team being known as the Peninsula-Co-Op Highlanders. In 2014, they were the PCSL Regular Season Champions as well as the Playoff champions, while the Reserve squad captured the Len McAdams League Cup as the Reserve Division champions.

The women's team folded after the 2014 season, initially along with the men's team, but was not part of the 2015 revival of the men's team with the new ownership group.

=== Reformation for 2022 ===
In 2021, it was announced that the Highlanders would be joining the new League1 British Columbia in both the men's and women's division, with the men's Highlanders organization merging with the women's club Vancouver Island FC, which played in the Women's Premier Soccer League. In April 2024, the club withdrew from the league due to rising costs.

== Seasons ==
as Victoria Stars FC

Season	League	Teams	Record	Rank	Playoffs	Ref
2001	PCSL	8	5–2–7	6th	Did not qualify	
2002	PCSL	8	7–2–5	4th	4th	
2003	PCSL	9	6–4–5	5th	Did not qualify	
2004	PCSL	6	1–6–3	5th	Finalists	
2005	PCSL	8	8–1–1	1st	Finalists	
2006	PCSL	8	9–1–4	3rd	Semi-finals	
2007	PCSL	8	5–3–6	5th	Did not qualify	
2008	PCSL	9	12–3–1	1st	Champions	
2009	PCSL	9	10–3–3	3rd	Semi-finals	

as Victoria Highlanders

Season	League	Teams	Record	Rank	Playoffs	Ref
2010	PCSL	9	12–1–3	2nd	Semi-finals	
2011	USL W-League	8	1–3–10	8th	Did not qualify	

as Peninsula Co-op Highlanders

Season	League	Teams	Record	Rank	Playoffs	Ref
2012	USL W-League	8	1–1–12	8th	Did not qualify	
2013	PCSL	9	13–2–1	2nd	Semi-finals	
2014	PCSL	6	10–0–0	1st	Champions	

as Victoria Highlanders FC

Season	League	Teams	Record	Rank	Playoffs	Ref
2022	League1 British Columbia	7	3–1–8	5th	did not qualify	
2023	League1 British Columbia	8	3–4–7	7th	did not qualify	
