= Vancouver Island FC =

Canadian soccer team

- Full name: Vancouver Island Football Club
- Founded: 2018
- Head coach: Neil Sedgwick
- League: WPSL
- 2019: 2nd, Northwest
- Website: http://wpslvancouverisland.ca/

Vancouver Island FC was a Canadian women's soccer team based in Victoria, British Columbia that played in Women's Premier Soccer League. In 2021, the team merged with the male Victoria Highlanders to serve as the club's women's club in League1 British Columbia, where they will operate as the Victoria Highlanders Women.

== History ==
In October 2018, it was announced that a women's soccer team in Victoria, British Columbia would be formed to compete in the US-based Women's Premier Soccer League. They would be the league second Canadian franchise along with the TSS FC Rovers. Women's soccer had previously existed in Victoria, with the Victoria Highlanders Women previously playing in the USL W-League in 2011 and 2012. Despite having a different ownership from the professional men's team Pacific FC, which also began play in 2019, Vancouver Island FC chose a similar colour scheme to share common aspects, also playing out of the same stadium, Westhills Stadium.

They played their first exhibition match on May 12, 2019 against TSS FC Rovers winning 3-1.

They made their official league debut on May 18 against the Spokane Shadow, losing by a score of 2-0.

In their second game of the season, they defeated the reigning champions Seattle Sounders Women by a score of 2-1 for the franchise's first official victory.

They finished their debut season with a record of 6 wins and 2 losses, finishing in second place in the Northwest Conference, scoring 17 goals, while conceding 11. At the end of the 2019 season, the club was named the WPSL's Franchise of the Year. The 2020 season was cancelled due to the COVID-19 pandemic.

In 2021, it was announced that the club would be merging with the male Victoria Highlanders to begin play in the new League1 British Columbia women's division, under the Highlanders name, reforming the Victoria Highlanders Women who last played in 2014.

== Seasons ==
Season	League	Division	Teams	Record	Rank	Playoffs	Ref
2019	WPSL	Northwest Conference	9	6–0–2	2nd	none	
2020	WPSL	Season cancelled due to the COVID-19 pandemic					

== Notable former players ==
- (Canada) Ashley Cathro
- (Tonga) (Canada) Kiana Swift
