= Kamloops Excel =

- Full name: Kamloops Excel
- Nickname: Excel
- Founded: 2007
- Stadium: Hillside Stadium
- Capacity: 2,000
- Chairman: Frank Salituro
- Manager: Franco Spada
- League: Pacific Coast Soccer League
- 2019: 6th
Home colours	Away colours

Kamloops Excel is a Canadian soccer team based in Kamloops, British Columbia. Founded in 2007, the team plays in the Pacific Coast Soccer League (PCSL), an amateur league which features teams from British Columbia. They now play in the reserve division.

The team plays its home matches in at Hillside Stadium on the campus of Thompson Rivers University, where they have played since 2007. The team's colours are maroon, white and black. Frank Salituro was the coach as of 2007.

== Year-by-year ==
Year	Division	League	Reg. season	Playoffs	Open Canada Cup
2007	4	PCSL	9th		Did not qualify
2008	4	PCSL	7th		Did not qualify
2009	4	PCSL	5th		
2010	4	PCSL	6th		
2011	4	PCSL	7th		

== Stadiums ==
- Hillside Stadium; Kamloops, British Columbia (2007–present)
