= Eddie Mukahanana =

Zimbabwean footballer (born 1977)

Personal information
- Full name: Eddie Mukahanana
- Date of birth: 9 March 1977 (age 49)
- Place of birth: Bulawayo, Zimbabwe

Senior career*
Years	Team	Apps	(Gls)
	Highlanders FC (Zimbabwe)	?	(?)
	Zimbabwe Saints (Zimbabwe)		(5)
	CSU Bakersfield, US		(2)
	University of Montevallo, US		(56)
	Central Coast Roadrunners, US		(8)
	Des Moines Menace, US		(2)
	Zimbabwe Saints (Zimbabwe)		(11)

International career
1993–1997	Zimbabwe	2	(0)

Managerial career
- Various Youth Club (US/Canada)
- Victoria United FC (Canada)
- Victoria Stars FC (Canada)
- Westcastle International Academy (2019-Current)
- * Club domestic league appearances and goals

Eddie Mukahanana born 9 March 1977 in Bulawayo, Zimbabwe is a Zimbabwean former footballer. He is the Owner and Technical Director of Westcastle International Academy and Head Coach of the Men's Premier Team in the Pacific Coast Soccer League.

== Playing career ==
He was a member of the Zimbabwe national football team during the 1998 FIFA World Cup Qualifiers. He also received youth national team call ups to the U17 and U20 National teams during the COSAFA Youth Championships.

His professional career started with Highlanders FC and then moved to Zimbabwe Saints in the Zimbabwe Premier Soccer League making his debut at the age of 17-year 2 months.

In the United States (1995–2000) he attended the University of Montevallo on a soccer scholarship, from where he would then travel every summer break to play for Zimbabwe Saints until 2000.

In the United States, Mukahanana played for the Central Coast Roadrunners (USL) in 1996 and 2001 Des Moines Menace (PDL).

Retirement in 2002 due to an injury.

After retirement from professional soccer, Mukahanana joined Victoria United at the end of 2002 season before finally turning to coaching full-time.

== Coaching career ==
First discovered his passion for coaching at age 24, whilst still a professional player, he started his coaching career in the US coaching a High School Boys U16 team: "he instantly realized that once he stopped playing, the only thing he wanted was to go into coaching full-time". Following a serious ankle injury ended his professional playing career while playing in the USL, by then Eddie had already gained his National B License with the United States Soccer Federation (USSF) and his path into coaching was well and truly underway. He attained his UEFA A License in 2011.

He has coached Pacific Coast Soccer League Champions Victoria United Football Club and Victoria Stars Football Club in Canada, Bakersfield Warriors F.C in the US and various youth club teams in Canada . Mukahanana was the Technical Director for Bays United Football Club from 2004 to 2021.

== Club Ownership ==
Mukahanana founded Westcastle International Academy (WIA) in Victoria, BC Canada. WIA a premier soccer academy located in Victoria, BC, within the Lower Island Soccer Association (LISA) District. WIA's youth teams, U9-U18, play in the Canada Soccer's Competitive Pathway and the club's U23 Men's and Women's Teams, Pathway to Pro Program, play in the Pacific Coast Soccer League and Vancouver Island Soccer League.
