= Navid Mashinchi =

Canadian soccer player

Personal information
- Full name: Navid Mashinchi
- Date of birth: February 16, 1989 (age 37)
- Place of birth: Düsseldorf, Germany
- Height: 5 ft 11 in (1.80 m)
- Positions: Defender; midfielder

Youth career
- 2003–2006: Fortuna Düsseldorf
- 2006–2007: Westside FC Rangers

Senior career*
Years	Team	Apps	(Gls)
2006–2008	Whitecaps Residency	14	(1)
2008–2009	Vancouver Whitecaps	15	(0)
- * Club domestic league appearances and goals

Navid Mashinchi (Persian: نوید ماشین چی Navīd Māšīn Cī) is the retired German-born Canadian soccer player, who played for the Vancouver Whitecaps. Following his playing career, he worked in the analytics department as a performance analyst for the Vancouver Whitecaps FC of Major League Soccer. Mashinchi graduated with a Data Science master's degree from the University of Denver, and is currently working as a data scientist at Kohl's.

== Playing career ==
Mashinchi began his career in Germany, playing in the U-15 and U-17 teams of German third division club Fortuna Düsseldorf.

After moving with his family to Canada, Mashinchi joined the Vancouver Whitecaps residency program, simultaneously playing club soccer with the Westside FC Rangers U-21 side of the Vancouver Metro Soccer League U-21 Division. Mashinchi scored 14 goals in 15 games for Westside in 2006.

Mashinchi played with the Vancouver Whitecaps Residency in Europe in 2007, and in the team's first Premier Development League season in 2008, before being called up to the senior Vancouver Whitecaps side. He made his professional debut on July 23, 2008, in a game against Charleston Battery. After releasing in January 2009 was re-signed on 1 May 2009 from Vancouver Whitecaps.

== Tech career ==
Following his playing career, Mashinchi worked in the analytics department as a performance analyst for the Vancouver Whitecaps of Major League Soccer for four seasons under head coach Carl Robinson.

Mashinchi has been working in analytics for four-plus years. From June 1, 2014 - December 31, 2014, he joined the analytics department as an intern before getting hired as a full-time analyst and serving the club from January 1, 2015 - February 1, 2018. Through his time with the Vancouver Whitecaps, he attained the Major League Soccer playoffs in 2015, 2017, won the 2015 Amway Canadian Championship, and advanced to the 2017 Concacaf Champions League.

In September 2021, Mashinchi joined Kohl's as a data scientist.

== Education ==
Mashinchi attended Heritage Woods Secondary School and Burnaby Central Secondary from 2006 to 2008. Following his time as a professional soccer player, he attended the University of British Columbia as a student-athlete playing for the UBC Thunderbirds from 2010 to 2015. He graduated from the Bachelor of Commerce program at the UBC Sauder School of Business. In 2019, he followed his passion for analytics and pursued a Data Science Master's degree. Mashinchi graduated from the University of Denver's Ritchie School of Engineering and Computer Science in 2021.

== Honours ==
- 2004: Niederrheinmeister: C-Junioren-Kreisauswahl
