= Whitecaps FC Prospects =

Former soccer team

- Full name: Whitecaps FC Prospects
- Nicknames: The Caps, Selects
- Founded: 2008
- Dissolved: 2009
- Stadium: Terry Fox Field
- Chairman: David Markley
- Coach: Matt Holbrook
- League: Pacific Coast Soccer League
- 2008: 9th
Home colours	Away colours

Whitecaps FC Prospects was a Canadian soccer team based in Burnaby, British Columbia, Canada. Founded in 2008, the team played in Pacific Coast Soccer League (PCSL), a national amateur league at the fourth tier of the American Soccer Pyramid, which features teams from western Canada and the Pacific Northwest region of the United States.

The team played its home matches Terry Fox Field on the campus of Simon Fraser University, where they had played since 2008. The team's colours are blue and white.

The team was created following the Vancouver Whitecaps U-23 team's move from the PCSL to the USL Premier Development League in 2008, and was an official part of the development system for the Vancouver Whitecaps FC Major League Soccer club.

== Year-by-year ==
Year	Division	League	Reg. season	Playoffs
2008	4	PCSL	9th	Did not qualify
2009	4	PCSL	9th	Did not qualify

== Head coaches ==
- (Canada) Matt Holbrook (2008–2009)

== Stadia ==
- Terry Fox Field at Simon Fraser University; Burnaby, British Columbia (2008–2009)
