= Steve Scott (footballer) =

Welsh footballer

Personal information
- Full name: Stephen Richard Scott
- Date of birth: 5 November 1966 (age 59)
- Place of birth: Johnstown, Wales
- Position: Defender

Senior career*
Years	Team	Apps	(Gls)
1983–1985	Wrexham	0	(0)
1985–1986	Oswestry Town		
1986–1988	Wrexham	2	(0)
1988	Oswestry Town		
1988–1993	Lex XI		
1993	Bridgnorth Town		
1993–1994	Brymbo Steelworks		
1994	Shifnal Town		
1994	Lex XI		
- Newtown
- * Club domestic league appearances and goals

Stephen Richard Scott (born 5 November 1966) is a Welsh former professional footballer who played as a defender. He started as a youth player at Wrexham and later re-signed for the club making appearances in the English Football League for the club under non-contract terms. He also played for Oswestry Town, Lex XI, Bridgnorth Town, Brymbo Steelworks, Shifnal Town and Newtown. He is now the managing director of a school travel company called Activ4.
