= Hillside Stadium =

Stadium in Kamloops, British Columbia

Coordinates: 50.669247°N 120.366311°W

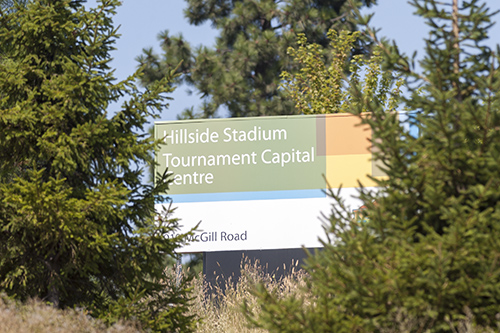
- Interactive map of Hillside Stadium
- Location: Thompson Rivers University, Kamloops, B.C., Canada
- Capacity: 1,060
- Surface: Sportexe PowerBlade turf Rubberized 400m track

Construction
- Opened: 2006

Tenants
- Thompson Rivers WolfPack; Kamloops Broncos (CJFL) (2007-present) KamloopsUnited (L1BC) (2022-present)

Hillside Stadium is a multi-purpose, fully lit stadium located next to Thompson Rivers University in Kamloops, British Columbia. It is the home of the Thompson Rivers WolfPack, Kamloops Broncos of the Canadian Junior Football League, and the Kamloops Excel of the Pacific Coast Soccer League. It was a FIFA Recommended 1-Star installation when originally completed, but that has since expired. Besides hosting field events, it has a rubberized 400m running track and facilities for other track and field events. The stadium has aluminum bleachers, with a permanent seating capacity of 1,060. Hillside Stadium hosted the track and field events at the 1993 Canada Summer Games.

In addition, there are two additional soccer fields and track and field facilities. As well as the new fieldhouse which includes a 200m indoor track, gymnastics space, multi-function gym, and classrooms. The complex also includes the Canada Games Aquatic Centre.
