= Puget Sound Soccer Academy Rapids =

PSSA Rapids
- Full name: Puget Sound Soccer Academy Rapids
- Nickname: The Rapids
- Founded: 2001
- Dissolved: 2009
- Stadium: Whatcom Community College
- Chairman: Darren Bell; Tim Busch
- Manager: Todd Stauber
- League: Pacific Coast Soccer League
- 2008: 5th
Home colours	Away colours

Puget Sound Soccer Academy Rapids (more commonly known as PSSA Rapids) was an American soccer team, founded in 2001. The team was a member of the Pacific Coast Soccer League (PCSL), a recognized Division IV league in the American Soccer Pyramid which features teams from western Canada and the Pacific Northwest region of the United States of America, until 2009.

The team played its home matches in the stadium on the campus of Whatcom Community College in the city of Bellingham, Washington. The team's colors were navy blue and white.

Until 2005 the team competed as Skagit Rapids, and were based in the city of Mount Vernon, Washington, after which they became part of the larger Puget Sound Soccer Academy organisation.

== Players ==
=== Current roster ===
Note: Flags indicate national team as defined under FIFA eligibility rules; some limited exceptions apply. Players may hold more than one non-FIFA nationality.

No.	Pos.	Nation	Player
—		USA	Abdul Aman
—	DF	ENG	Nick Bowen
—		USA	Mike Belisle
—	DF	USA	Ben Coffey
—	MF	USA	Sean Connor
—		USA	Matt Hardin
—		USA	Michael Helms
—	DF	USA	Kalen Hemlock
—	FW	USA	Ryan Hopp
—	MF	USA	Oscar Jimenez
—	DF	USA	Nick Saletto
—		USA	Jake Jorgenson

No.	Pos.	Nation	Player
—		USA	Jason Jorgenson
—	MF	JPN	Shogo Kurihara
—	MF	USA	Josh Krieg
—		USA	Mike Lockwood
—	DF	USA	Matt Ranten
—	DF	USA	Robert Schaper
—		USA	Todd Stauber
—		USA	Kurt Swanson
—		USA	Haakon Taylor

== Year-by-year ==
Year	Division	League	Reg. season	Playoffs	US Open Cup
2001	4	PCSL	9th		Did not qualify
2002	4	PCSL	2nd		Did not qualify
2003	4	PCSL	5th		Did not qualify
2004	4	PCSL	6th		Did not qualify
2005	4	PCSL	6th, North	Did not qualify	Did not qualify
2006	4	PCSL	11th		Did not qualify
2007	4	PCSL	10th		Did not qualify
2008	4	PCSL	5th		Did not qualify
2009	4	PCSL			

== Head coaches ==
- (United States) Todd Stauber 2006–present

== Stadia ==
- Stadium at Whatcom Community College; Bellingham, Washington 2006–present
