= Athletic Club of BC =

- Full name: Athletic Club of British Columbia
- Founded: 2009
- Dissolved: 2010
- Stadium: Burnaby Lake Athletic Complex West
- Chairman: Rich Gablehouse
- League: Fraser Valley Soccer League
Home colours	Away colours

Athletic Club of BC were a now dissolved Canadian soccer team based in Burnaby, British Columbia, Canada.

== History ==
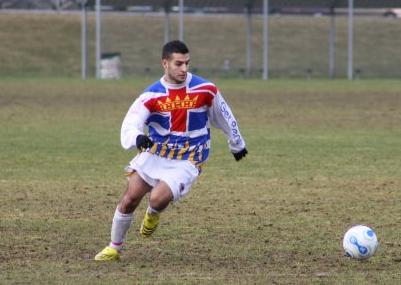
The unique British Columbia flag design ACBC jerseys.

The club was founded in 2009, the team played in the Pacific Coast Soccer League (PCSL), a national amateur league at the fourth tier of the American Soccer Pyramid, which features teams from western Canada and the Pacific Northwest region of the United States of America. During the winter the club competed in the Premier division of the Fraser Valley Soccer League.

The team played its home matches at the Burnaby Lake Athletic Complex West, where they have played since 2009. The team's colours were blue, yellow and white.

On July 7, 2010, the PCSL announced that it has suspended the Athletic Club of BC.

== Year-by-year ==
Year	Division	League	Season (W-D-L)	Playoffs	Open Canada Cup
2009	4	PCSL	T-7 (2-5-9)		

== Honours ==
=== Competition history ===
- 2009 BC Men's Provincial Open Cup: lost in quarter-finals

== Stadium ==
- Burnaby Lake Athletic Complex West; Burnaby, British Columbia (2009–2010)
