= Victoria United (Canada) =

- Full name: Victoria United
- Nickname: United
- Founded: 1904
- Dissolved: 2014, reconstituted 2020
- Stadium: Royal Athletic Park
- Capacity: 4,247
- Manager: Steve Scott
- League: Pacific Coast Soccer League
- 2014: 7th
- Website: http://www.vicunited.com/
| Home colours | Away colours |

Victoria United is a Canadian soccer team based in Victoria, British Columbia, Canada. With lineage to clubs founded in 1904, the team plays in the Pacific Coast Soccer League (PCSL), a provincial amateur league featuring teams from British Columbia and the Pacific Northwest region of the United States.

From the 1930s through 1970s, Victoria United FC played in the old Pacific Coast League, notably winning five league championships and one playoff tile (Top Star Trophy). In 1967, they won the Pacific Coast International Championship for the J.F. Kennedy Trophy.

From 1994 through 2012 Victoria played its home matches at Royal Athletic Park. Because of conflicts with the newly introduced semi-professional baseball team at Royal Athletic Park, United played the 2013 and 2014 seasons at Braefoot Park in Saanich. The team's colours are blue and white.

On October 1, 2014, the team announced that it would be dissolved. It was reconstituted in 2020 and was scheduled to re-join the PCSL for the 2020 season, but this was delayed until 2022.

== History ==
The team was formed in 1904 as a merger of two Victoria teams, Victoria Association Football Club, and Victoria Capitals. Until its dissolution, Victoria United was one of the oldest surviving sports clubs in North America. They were also one of the more successful clubs in the PCSL, having been champions on five occasions in the modern era.

The formation of the USL Premier Development League's Victoria Highlanders starting in the 2009 season reduced Victoria United's success on and off the field. Former United stars such as Tyler and Jordan Hughes joined the Highlanders, the fanbase gravitated to the higher-level PDL side, and the once-formidable United fell in the standings, even finishing behind the Highlanders reserve team in 2010.

Beginning in 2011 the Highlanders shared United's ground at Royal Athletic Park, while United also had to split time with baseball's Victoria Seals and HarbourCats. The shortage of stadium time and added competition eventually compelled United to move to smaller Braefoot Park in 2013, and was noted as a reason for the team folding at the end of the 2014 season.

== Players ==
Notable alumni of the team include senior Canadian internationals Josh Simpson, Adam Straith, and Simon Thomas. National Basketball Association star Steve Nash, who played youth soccer in Victoria, appeared in one league game with Victoria in 2001 and recorded an assist.

== Year-by-year ==
The Pacific Coast Soccer League champion is the premier team with the most points at the end of the season. The top four men's premier teams or the Host team and the top three compete in a single game knockout tournament to decide the playoff champion.

The top Canadian team in the Pacific Coast Soccer League is also eligible to compete in a tournament against the top amateur teams from Washington State and Oregon State. This competition includes the league champion (or next highest placed team) as a host team and is a single game knockout tournament.

The Victoria Highlanders and Victoria United maintain a friendly relationship and play a charity match each preseason around July 1.

| Year | Division | League | Reg. season | Playoffs | GP | W | D | L | GF | GA | Pts |
|---|---|---|---|---|---|---|---|---|---|---|---|
| 1995 | 4 | PCSL | 1st | | 18 | 13 | 3 | 2 | 72 | 16 | 42 |
| 1996 | 4 | PCSL | 2nd | | 12 | 8 | 2 | 2 | 37 | 14 | 26 |
| 1997 | 4 | PCSL | 2nd | | 12 | 8 | 1 | 3 | 25 | 14 | 25 |
| 1998 | 4 | PCSL | 3rd | | 16 | 9 | 1 | 6 | 45 | 24 | 28 |
| 1999 | 4 | PCSL | 5th | | 18 | 9 | 2 | 7 | 35 | 30 | 29 |
| 2000 | 4 | PCSL | 4th | | 14 | 7 | 3 | 4 | 37 | 24 | 24 |
| 2001 | 4 | PCSL | 3rd | | 16 | 9 | 3 | 4 | 43 | 26 | 30 |
| 2002 | 4 | PCSL | 1st | | 18 | 12 | 4 | 2 | 46 | 7 | 40 |
| 2003 | 4 | PCSL | 2nd | | 15 | 11 | 2 | 2 | 46 | 12 | 35 |
| 2004 | 4 | PCSL | 1st | | 16 | 10 | 4 | 2 | 43 | 23 | 34 |
| 2005 | 4 | PCSL | 1st, South | Champions | 16 | 11 | 3 | 2 | 54 | 17 | 36 |
| 2006 | 4 | PCSL | 5th | | 14 | 8 | 2 | 4 | 42 | 23 | 26 |
| 2007 | 4 | PCSL | 1st | DNQ | 18 | 10 | 6 | 2 | 50 | 27 | 36 |
| 2008 | 4 | PCSL | 1st | | 18 | 13 | 3 | 2 | 60 | 21 | 42 |
| 2009 | 4 | PCSL | 6th | DNQ | 16 | 7 | 3 | 6 | 35 | 26 | 24 |
| 2010 | 4 | PCSL | 5th | DNQ | 16 | 6 | 2 | 8 | 36 | 29 | 20 |
| 2011 | 4 | PCSL | 5th | DNQ | 12 | 5 | 0 | 7 | 254 | 28 | 15 |
| 2012 | 4 | PCSL | 5th | DNQ | 16 | 7 | 1 | 8 | 31 | 37 | 22 |
| 2013 | 4 | PCSL | 5th | DNQ | 14 | 4 | 4 | 6 | 17 | 28 | 16 |
| 2014 | 4 | PCSL | 7th | DNQ | 14 | 4 | 3 | 7 | 32 | 34 | 15 |

== Honours ==
- PCSL League Champions 2008
- Sheila Anderson Memorial (Challenge) Cup Winners 2008
- PCSL League Champions 2007
- Sheila Anderson Memorial (Challenge) Cup Winners 2007
- Sheila Anderson Memorial (Challenge) Cup Winners 2006
- PCSL League Champions 2005
- PCSL South Division Champions 2005
- J. F. Kennedy Trophy Winners 2005
- PCSL League Champions 2004
- Sheila Anderson Memorial (Challenge) Cup Winners 2004
- J. F. Kennedy Trophy Winners 2004
- PCSL League Champions 2002
- J. F. Kennedy Trophy Winners 2002
- Sheila Anderson Memorial (Challenge) Cup Winners 1998
- Sheila Anderson Memorial (Challenge) Cup Winners 1996
- J. F. Kennedy Trophy Winners 1996
- PCSL League Champions 1995
- Sheila Anderson Memorial (Challenge) Cup Winners 1995

=== More Honors ===
- Island & BC Champions 1896 (as Victoria Association Football Club)
- BC Champions 1900 (as Victoria Association Football Club)
- BC Senior Football League Champions 1901–1902 (as Victoria Association Football Club)
- Garrison Cup Winners 1904–1905
- V.A.F. League Champions 1905–1906
- Island Senior League Champions 1905–1906
- Victoria City League Champions 1906–1907 (as Wanderers)
- Brackman-Kerr Cup Winners 1933–1934
- Pacific Coast League winners 1935–1936, 1951–1952, 1966–1967, 1967–1968, 1971–1972
- Top Star Trophy (PCSL Playoffs) 1971–1972
- Pacific Coast International Championship for the J.F. Kennedy Trophy 1966–1967
- Nanaimo Challenge Cup Winners 1937–1938
- Jackson Cup Winners 1940–1941, 1950–1951
- Price Cup Winners 1941–1942
- Solarium Winners Cup 1950–1951
- Anderson Cup Winners 1994

== Head coaches ==
- (Canada) Nico Craveiro (2021–present)
- (Canada) Steve Scott (2012–2014)
- (Trinidad and Tobago) Nick Daniels (2010–2012)
- (Zimbabwe) Eddie Mukahanana (2009–2010)
- (Canada) Ben Hooker (2007–2008)
- (Canada) Kevin Mennie (2006)
- (Canada) Dante Zanatta (2001–2005)
- (Canada) Rob Williams (1999–2000)
- (Canada) David Ravenhill and (Canada) Nick Gilbert (1998)
- (Canada) Frank Woods (1997)
- (Canada) Buzz Parsons (1996–1997)
- (Canada) Frank Woods (1994–1995)

== Stadium ==
- Royal Athletic Park; Victoria, British Columbia (1995–2012)
- Braefoot Park; Saanich, British Columbia (2013–2014)
