= Hibernian Saints =

American soccer team

- Full name: Hibernian and Caledonian F.C.
- Nickname: The Saints
- Founded: 1993
- Dissolved: 2006
- Stadium: Starfire Sports Complex
- Capacity: 2,000
- Chairman: Teddy Mitalas
- Manager: Jimmy McAlister
- League: Pacific Coast Soccer League
- 2006: 6th
Home colours	Away colours

Hibernian Saints was an American soccer team based in Seattle, Washington. Founded in 1993, the team was a member of the Pacific Coast Soccer League (PCSL), a recognized fourth-division league in the American Soccer Pyramid which features teams from western Canada and the Pacific Northwest. The Saints last participated in the PCSL in 2006. They were another soccer team in Seattle besides the Sounders, while they operated.

The team played in the PCSL under four different names: Seattle FC (1995), Seattle Hibernian (1996–2004), Hibernian & Caledonian (2005), and Hibernian Saints (2006). The team were PCSL champions four times, in 1996, 1999, 2000 and 2001. The women's team were league cup champions in 2001 and 2005. The women's team merged with the Seattle Sounders Women before the start of the 2006 season.

During their final years, the Saints played their home matches at the Starfire Sports Complex in the city of Tukwila, Washington, 11 miles south of Downtown Seattle. The team's colors were white and green.

== Year-by-year ==
Year	Division	League	Reg. season	Playoffs	Open Cup
1995	"3"	PCSL	8th	Did not qualify	Did not qualify
1996	"3"	PCSL	1st	Did not qualify	Did not qualify
1997	"3"	PCSL	3rd	Did not qualify	Did not qualify
1998	"3"	PCSL	2nd	Did not qualify	Did not qualify
1999	"3"	PCSL	1st	Champion	Did not qualify
2000	"3"	PCSL	1st	Did not qualify	Did not qualify
2001	"3"	PCSL	1st	Did not qualify	Did not qualify
2002	"3"	PCSL	4th	Champion	Did not qualify
2003	"3"	PCSL	3rd	Did not qualify	Did not qualify
2004	"3"	PCSL	3rd	Did not qualify	Did not qualify
2005	"3"	PCSL	2nd, North	Did not qualify	Did not qualify
2006	"3"	PCSL	6th	Did not qualify	Did not qualify

== Notable Championships ==
- 1996 NANIS Men's National Champions (Columbus, OH)
- 1997 NANIS Men's National Champions (Columbus, OH)
- 2002 USSF-USASA Men's O-30 National Cup Champions (Philadelphia, PA)
- 2003 USASA-USSF Men's O-40 Veterans Cup National Champions (Honolulu, HI)
- 2003 USASA-USSF Women's National Cup Champions (Milwaukee, WI)
- 2004 USSF-USASA Men's O-30 National Cup Champions (Orlando, FL)
- 2005 USSF-USASA Men's O-40 Veterans Cup National Champions (Wilmington, NC)
- 2005 USSF-USASA Men's National Cup Champions (Dallas, TX)
- 2007 USSF-USASA Men's O-40 Veterans Cup National Champions (Bellingham, WA)
- 2008 USSF-USASA Men's O-45 Veterans Cup National Champions (Bellingham, WA)
- 2011 HSA-ISSA-WSSA Men's O-40 Masters Fútbol Cup National Soccer Champions (Longview, WA)
- 2012 HSA-ISSA-WSSA Men's O-50 Masters Fútbol Cup National Soccer Champions (Bellingham, WA)
- 2013 USSF-USASA Men's O-50 Veterans Cup National Champions (San Diego, CA)

Source: PCSL Standings

The Seattle Hibernian & Caledonian F.C. of the Pacific Coast Soccer League Men's Division won the 2005 USSF-USASA National Cup Championship in the Men's Amateur category, defeating Region I champions Baltimore Allied 2-1 in the final in Dallas, Texas on Sunday, August 7, 2005. The Hibernian & Caledonian men's team in June beat Santa Clara Sporting (SCS) from Northern California, 2-1, to win the Region IV championship and earn their spot at the Nationals.

== Coaches ==
- Jim McAlister: 2006
- Colin Mcneill
- Steve McCargo
- John Purtteman

== Men Players ==
- Seth Altshuler (D)
- Sean Bannon (D)
- Scott Blokker (D/M)
- Christian Cole (D)
- Loren McBride Cohen (M/F)
- John Cowmey (M)
- Jarred Dickerson (M/D)
- Jim Dempsey (D/M)
- Ken Dorn (D)
- Mike Francis (F)
- Andy Gaston (M/D)
- Craig Gibson (D)
- Dane Grindle (F)
- John Hall (M/F)
- Matthew Hulen (M/F)
- Nick Kalafadich (F/M)
- Ricky Karr (D/M)
- Adam Kay (M)
- Andy Klubberud (G)
- Arnie Klubberud (M)
- Tim Lawson (M)
- Jerry Lupoy (M)
- Clint Manny (M)
- Geoff Martin (M)
- Doug Morrill (D)
- Johann Noetzel (G)
- Sean O'Fallon (G)
- Brad Owens (M)
- Stefan Ritter (D)
- Chris Ruffner (F)
- Mike Rundquist (M)
- Nate Sabari (D/M)
- Chris Santee (F)
- Chris Sarver (M)
- George Singh (D)
- Todd Stauber (M)
- Erik Storkson (F)
- Mark Szabo (M)
- Stan Thesenwitz (F)
- Tim Tilbury (D)
- Mark Volpe (M/D)
- James Volpentest (G/F)
- Dave Wheeler (F/M)
- Chad Zlateff (F)
- Matt Zlateff (M/D)
- Sidney Zanin (M/F)
- Tom Boatright (D)
- John Purtteman (M/D)
- Steve Zimmerman (M)
- Charles Rowe (M/F)
- Chris Michael (D)

== Women Players ==
- Miranda Armstrong (M)
- Carmen (Sarro) Zlateff (M)
- Betsy (Woods) McNeil (M)
- Laura Robinson (D)
- Stefanie Johnson (D)
- Shauna Stine (F)
- Dana Kimble (D)
- Amanda Shellenberger (M/F)
- AJ (Fairburn) Whaley (M)
