= FK Pacific =

- Full name: FK Pacific
- Nickname: The Tsunamis
- Founded: 2003
- Stadium: Starfire Sports Complex; Memorial Stadium
- Capacity: 3,000; 17,000
- Chairman: Lev Shabalow
- Manager: Prokop Tona
- League: Pacific Coast Soccer League
- 2007: 4th
Home colours	Away colours

FK Pacific was an American soccer team, founded in 2003. The team participated in the Pacific Coast Soccer League (PCSL), a recognised Division III league in the American Soccer Pyramid which features teams from western Canada and the Pacific Northwest region of the United States of America. They last participated in the PCSL in 2007.

Pacific played their home matches at the Starfire Sports Complex in the city of Tukwila, Washington, 11 miles south of downtown Seattle, and at the Memorial Stadium in Seattle itself. The team's colors were red, blue and black.

== 2007 Roster ==
Note: Flags indicate national team as defined under FIFA eligibility rules; some limited exceptions apply. Players may hold more than one non-FIFA nationality.

No.	Pos.	Nation	Player
—	FW	GAB	Dariot Abaga
—	DF	USA	Uday Al Alaq
—	MF	RUS	Viktor Bychkov
—	FW	GAM	Ebou Cham
—	MF	USA	Vyacheslav Denega
—	MF	USA	Ryan Dey
—	MF	ETH	Hailu Gebrekidan
—	FW	GEO	David Gelashvili
—	MF	USA	Edgar Gonzales
—	FW	USA	Isaiah Herrera
—	MF	USA	Sergio Iniguez
—	MF	USA	Alex Lee

No.	Pos.	Nation	Player
—	DF	USA	Aaron Patterson
—	DF	USA	Ben Rusch
—	GK	USA	Nathan Salveson
—	FW	USA	Mikel Samaniego
—	DF	USA	Devon Smith
—	GK	USA	Sean Snyder
—	DF	USA	Stephen Snyder
—	MF	USA	Kleon Tona
—	DF	ETH	Mikyes Wolde
—	MF	USA	Jeff Wruck
—	MF	SCO	Chris Hogg
—	DF	USA	Sean Webb
—	MF	CRO	Vinko Zlomislic

== Year-by-year ==
Year	Division	League	Reg. season	Playoffs	Open Cup
2006	"4"	PCSL	2nd	Did not qualify	Did not qualify
2007	"4"	PCSL	4th	Did not qualify	Did not qualify
