= Apple Bowl =

Multi-purpose stadium in Kelowna, British Columbia

- Interactive map of Apple Bowl
- Address: 1555 Burtch Road; Kelowna, British Columbia; V1Y 6R9
- Coordinates: 49.886506°N 119.458361°W
- Owner: City of Kelowna
- Capacity: 2,314
- Surface: Natural grass Rubberized 400m track

Construction
- Opened: 1995

Tenants
- Okanagan Sun (CJFL) (1995–present); Okanagan Challenge (PCSL) (2005–2012); Okanagan FC (PCSL) (2019–present); BC Lions (CFL) (2026) (Note: Two games only.)

The Apple Bowl is a multi-purpose stadium located in the Parkinson Recreation Park in Kelowna, British Columbia. It was built for the 1980 BC Summer Games. It is the home of the Okanagan Sun of the Canadian Junior Football League and Okanagan FC of the Pacific Coast Soccer League. It is formerly the home of the Okanagan Challenge of the same league. Besides hosting field events, it has a rubberized 400m running track and facilities for other track and field events. The stadium seats 1,054 in the grandstand, an additional 1,200 on aluminum bleachers, and had new moulded seating installed in the main grandstand in 2006. The Apple Bowl also has a mini-track, and sand pit for long jump as well as an area for shot put events. It is commonly used for track and field events. It has hosted the Canadian Bowl twice, in 1997 and 2000, with the latter game drawing a crowd of 6,200 spectators.

In 2005, the stadium hosted international soccer matches at the under-15 and under-19 levels between Canada and New Zealand.

In 2024, the Canadian Premier League held its inaugural "On Tour" match between Vancouver FC and Cavalry FC at the Bowl, drawing over 6,200 attendees.

In September 2025, it was announced that the BC Lions of the Canadian Football League (CFL) would play their first two home games of the 2026 season at the Apple Bowl, due to BC Place hosting matches during the 2026 FIFA World Cup. The Apple Bowl's capacity was temporarily expanded to between 17,500 and 20,000 spectators for the two CFL games.
