= Fraser Valley Action =

- Full name: Fraser Valley Action Football Club
- Nickname: Action
- Founded: 1993
- Stadium: Spartan Complex Stadium
- Chairman: Lee Ellis
- Manager: Pat Rhola
- League: Pacific Coast Soccer League
- 2008: on hiatus
Home colours	Away colours

Fraser Valley Action is a Canadian soccer team based in Langley, British Columbia, Canada. Founded in 1993, the team plays in Pacific Coast Soccer League (PCSL), a national amateur league at the fourth tier of the American Soccer Pyramid, which features teams from western Canada and the Pacific Northwest region of the United States of America.

The team plays its home matches in the Spartan Complex Stadium on the campus of Trinity Western University, where they have played since 2007. The team's colors are white, black and green.

== History ==
The team was developed under the auspice of Athletes in Action (AIA), a Christian ministry organization, and serves as a community that promotes the integration of faith and sport. The team played as Abbotsford AIA until 2000, played as Athletes in Action FC in 2001, and adopted its current name prior to the beginning of the 2002 season.

== Players ==
=== Current roster ===
Note: Flags indicate national team as defined under FIFA eligibility rules; some limited exceptions apply. Players may hold more than one non-FIFA nationality.

No.	Pos.	Nation	Player
—		CAN	Shawn Agnew
—		CAN	Josh Coleman
—		CAN	Justin Cordick
—		CAN	Mustafa Demirci
—		CAN	Todd Dutka
—		CAN	Lee Ellis
—		CAN	Rich Fagan
—		CAN	Jason Flint
—		CAN	Brian Fowler
—		CAN	Mark Heinhaus
—		CAN	Cory Janzen

No.	Pos.	Nation	Player
—		CAN	Jason Jorgenson
—		CAN	Adrian Kekec
—		CAN	Pat Kelly
—		CAN	Nathan Li
—		CAN	Josh McCaig
—		CAN	Andrew Roddy
—		CAN	Trevor Rosencrantz
—		CAN	Graham Roxburgh
—		CAN	Nathan Square-Briggs
—		CAN	Chris Trauter

== Year-by-year ==
Year	Division	League	Reg. season	Playoffs	Open Canada Cup
1995	4	PCSL	6th		Did not qualify
1996	4	PCSL	6th		Did not qualify
1997	4	PCSL	5th		Did not qualify
1998	4	PCSL	7th		Did not qualify
1999	4	PCSL	6th		Did not qualify
2000	4	PCSL	7th		Did not qualify
2001	4	PCSL	2nd		Did not qualify
2002	4	PCSL	5th		Did not qualify
2003	4	PCSL	4th		Did not qualify
2004	4	PCSL	3rd, North	Did not qualify	Did not qualify
2005	4	PCSL	2nd		Did not qualify
2006	4	PCSL	7th		Did not qualify
2007	4	PCSL	3rd		Did not qualify
2008	4	PCSL	on hiatus		
2009	4	PCSL			

== Head coaches ==
- (Canada) Pat Rhola (2007; 2009–present)

== Stadia ==
- Spartan Complex Stadium; Langley, British Columbia (2007; 2009–present)
