= Vancouver Metro Soccer League =

- Founded: 1973; 53 years ago (as the "British Columbia Senior Soccer League")
- Country: Canada
- Confederation: Canadian Soccer Association
- Divisions: 5 Men's Divisions + 7 Age Restricted Divisions
- Number of clubs: 96
- Feeder to: BC Soccer Adult Provincial Championships
- Current champions: BB5 United A CCB (2023-24)
- Website: www.vmslsoccer.com

The Vancouver Metro Soccer League (VMSL) is a men's soccer league operating in British Columbia, Canada primarily in the Lower Mainland area.

== History ==
The league is an amateur league, and does not compete against or promote teams to the Canadian Soccer Pyramid. The Premier Division provides the highest level of amateur play in British Columbia. This league has produced several British Columbia Soccer Association Province Cup Champions, including the last 9 consecutive champions. In 2007, the league also produced a runner-up to the Open Canada Cup in Columbus Clan FC.

The league has been home to several former USL First Division players, including Johnny Sulentic (Croatia SC), Alfredo Valente (Coquitlam Metro-Ford), David Morris (Pegasus FC), Jason Jordan (RCIU Legends), Jeff Clarke (Surrey United), Steve Kindel (Columbus Clan FC) and Ivor Evans (Richmond FC Olympics), who generally played in this league while free agents.

Due to COVID-19, the 2020-2021 season was cancelled, and teams competed in their respective Cohort Cups. The 12 premier teams were split into 3 groups of 4, participating in "The William Azzi - Premier Cup." Likewise, the 12 division 1 teams participated in "The Ruben Tremarco - Div 1 Cup." The 24 division 2 teams participated in "The Bob Allen - Div 2 Cup," competing in 6 groups of 4. Despite the promising start to the Cohort Cups, the league was forced to postpone until further notice in mid-November because of the new Covid-19 guidelines put in place by the Government of British Columbia.

== 2026-27 Teams (fall/winter) ==
=== Premier ===
- BB5 United CCB
- BCT Hurricanes A
- CMFSC A Wolves
- Coastal FC A
- Croatia SC A
- ICSF Columbus FC A
- Inter EDC A
- NVFC Norvan A
- Rinos VSC Altitude A
- SFC Pegasus A
- Vancouver Greencaps A
- VUFC A

=== Division 1 ===
- FC Serbia United A
- GFC Lions A
- ICSF Columbus FC EDC
- Meraloma FC A
- Metropolitan FC A
- Port Moody SC A
- Port Moody SC B Rangers
- Strathcona Primo FC A
- Tapatios FC White Eagles
- Vancouver Harps FC A
- VUFC Snipers A
- West Van FC A

=== Division 2 ===
- Bby Spartans FC Ares
- BCT Hurricane Tigers
- BCT Lobbans
- Bingers Army FC
- Burnaby FC Eagles A
- Burnaby Selects United
- CMFSC Lupi
- Cosmos FC A
- FC Romania A
- Gastown Astro FC A
- GFC Lions B
- ICSF Columbus FC C
- Joyous FC
- Metropolitan FC B
- Mundiavocat FC
- NVFC Norvan United
- Port Moody SC C
- Rain City Rovers
- Richmond Unicorn SC
- Royal City Rangers A
- Sea to Sky FC A
- SFC Temple
- Shaheen FC A
- Strathcona Primo FC B
- Twin Arrows
- Vancouver Greencaps Celtic [ex-Siaron A]
- Vancouver Greencaps Orix
- Vancouver Harps FC B
- VUFC Balaclava
- West Hounds FC A

=== Division 3 ===
- Bby Spartans FC Poseidon
- BCT CMB
- Burnaby FC Eagles B
- Burnaby FC Galaxy
- Burnaby FC Mustangs
- CMFSC Caproni
- Coastal FC B
- Cosmos FC B
- Croatia SC Mladost
- Dinamo Anatolia
- East Van FC
- Field Art FC GolaShow
- GFC Lions C
- Hibernians FC
- ICSF Columbus FC Azzurri A
- New West SC A
- NK Hrvat A
- NVFC Norvan 1878
- NVFC Norvan Storm
- PCOV A
- Playita FC Quolus
- Port Moody SC Endz
- Regent College FC
- Rinos VSC A France Football
- Royal City Rangers B
- Sea to Sky FC B
- Shaheen FC B
- Shawarma FC
- South Burnaby Metro Club
- Strathcona Primo FC Imports
- Sunset Beach FC
- VAFC A Blue Rangers
- Vancouver Apollon FC A
- Vancouver Greencaps Siaron A [ex-Celtic]
- VUFC Wolves
- West Hounds FC B
- West Van FC Lions Gate
- Westside FC A

=== Division 4 ===
- Atlixco
- Bby Spartans FC Hades
- Bby Spartans FC Zeus
- Burnaby FC Chelsea
- Cleves FC
- CMFSC Calcio
- Coastal FC C
- FC Kova
- Highlands VFC
- Metropolitan FC C
- Musqueam FC
- New Wells City FC Royals
- New Wells City FC Saints
- NorthStars VFC
- NVFC Norvan Lions
- Ross Street Raiders
- SouthVan FC
- Sumas FC
- Vancouver Grizzlies FC

== Imperial Cup ==
Teams in the VMSL play for the Imperial Cup, which has been contested since 1913.

Imperial Cup Champions:

- 1913 Thistle FC
- 1914 No Competition
- 1915 No Competition
- 1916 No Competition
- 1917 No Competition
- 1918 No Competition
- 1919 No Competition
- 1920 Thistle FC
- 1921 Wallace FC
- 1922 South Hill Army & Navy
- 1923 South Hill Army & Navy
- 1924 North Van Elks FC
- 1925 St. Andrew's FC
- 1926 Sapperton FC
- 1927 No Competition
- 1928 No Competition
- 1929 No Competition
- 1930 No Competition
- 1931 No Competition
- 1932 No Competition
- 1933 No Competition
- 1934 Art Monument FC
- 1935 Unknown
- 1936 Unknown
- 1937 St. Regis FC
- 1938 Excelsior Lumber
- 1939 Unknown
- 1940 Kerrisdale FC
- 1941 Unknown
- 1942 Richmond FC
- 1943 Unknown
- 1944 Army FC
- 1945 Norvan FC
- 1946 Vancouver United
- 1947 Collingwood FC
- 1948 Norquay FC
- 1949 Rainier Hotel FC
- 1950 South Hill FC and James Bldrs.
- 1951 Varsity FC
- 1952 A. N. & AF Unit #100
- 1953 Vancouver Pilseners
- 1954 Vancouver Pilseners
- 1955 Dubbell Wear FC
- 1956 Royal Oaks FC
- 1957 Capilanos FC
- 1958 Capilanos FC
- 1959 Wallace FC
- 1960 Vancouver Firefighters
- 1961 Vancouver Firefighters
- 1962 Royal Oaks FC
- 1963 University of BC
- 1964 Mount Pleasant Legion
- 1965 Vancouver Friuli
- 1966 North Shore United
- 1967 Lobbans FC
- 1968 Royal Oaks FC
- 1969 Glenavon FC and Lobbans
- 1970 Glenavon FC
- 1971 Lobbans FC
- 1972 Royal Oak Astors
- 1973 Vancouver Firefighters
- 1974 North Shore United
- 1975 North Shore Paul’s
- 1976 Unknown
- 1977 Italian Canadian Columbus
- 1978 Columbus FC
- 1979 Columbus Umberto
- 1980 Columbus Umberto
- 1981 Cliff Avenue United
- 1982 Vancouver Firefighters
- 1983 Vancouver Firefighters
- 1984 Discovery ’84 FC
- 1985 Norvan ANAF #45 FC
- 1986 Norvan ANAF #45 FC
- 1987 Queen’s Park Rangers
- 1988 Dartmen FC
- 1989 West Van Trollers
- 1990 Burnaby Lake Clubhouse
- 1991 Vancouver Firefighters
- 1992 Club Ireland FC
- 1993 Club Ireland FC
- 1994 Westside Rino
- 1995 Wesburn
- 1996 Croatia SC
- 1997 Croatia SC
- 1998 Croatia SC
- 1999 Indo-Canadians
- 2000 Westside FC 'A'
- 2001 ICSF Inter
- 2002 Westside Rino
- 2003 Westside Rino
- 2004 Pegasus FC
- 2005 Croatia SC
- 2006 Columbus-Clan FC
- 2007 Columbus-Clan FC
- 2008 Surrey United
- 2009 West Van FC
- 2010 Surrey United Firefighters
- 2011 West Van FC
- 2012 Delta Hurricanes FC
- 2013 Inter FC
- 2014 West Van FC
- 2015 EDC FC Burnaby
- 2016 Coquitlam Metro-Ford Wolves
- 2017 Pegasus FC
- 2018 Rino's Tigers
- 2019 West Van FC
- 2020 No Competition
- 2021 VUFC Hibernian
- 2022 BB5 United
- 2023 VUFC Hibernian

== Premier Division Champions ==
- 1982–83 Firefighters “A”
- 1983–84 Firefighters “A”
- 1984–85 Firefighters “A”
- 1985–86 Firefighters “A”
- 1986–87 Firefighters “A”
- 1987–88 Firefighters “A”
- 1988–89 Metro-Ford Wolves
- 1989–90 Norvan SC
- 1990–91 Norvan SC
- 1991–92 Metro-Ford Wolves
- 1992–93 Metro-Ford Wolves
- 1993–94 Vancouver Westside FC
- 1994–95 North Shore Pegasus
- 1995–96 North Shore Pegasus
- 1996–97 Sapperton Rovers
- 1997–98 Firefighters “A”
- 1998–99 Vancouver Westside FC
- 1999–00 Vancouver Westside FC
- 2000–01 Vancouver Westside FC
- 2001–02 Surrey United
- 2002–03 Vancouver Westside FC
- 2003–04 Surrey United
- 2004–05 ICSF Inter
- 2005–06 Surrey United
- 2006–07 ICSF Inter
- 2007–08 Sporting Club of Vancouver
- 2008–09 West Van FC
- 2009-10 Surrey United Firefighters
- 2010-11 Surrey United Firefighters
- 2011-12 ICST Pegasus
- 2012-13 Columbus FC
- 2013-14 West Van FC
- 2014-15 West Van FC
- 2015-16 Coquitlam Metro-Ford Wolves
- 2016-17 Coquitlam Metro-Ford Wolves
- 2017-18 BCT Rovers Tigers United
- 2018-19 Croatia SC
- 2019-20 Rino's Tigers Vancouver
- 2020-21 Season canceled
- 2021-22 BB5 United
- 2022-23 BB5 United
- 2023-24 BB5 United
