= Okanagan Challenge =

- Full name: Okanagan Challenge
- Founded: 1995
- Stadium: Apple Bowl
- Capacity: 2,314
- Chairman: Eric Tasker
- Manager: Kelly Wolverton
- League: Pacific Coast Soccer League
- 2019: 4th
Home colors	Away colors

Okanagan Challenge is a Canadian soccer team based in Kelowna, British Columbia. Founded in 1995, the team plays in the Pacific Coast Soccer League (PCSL), an amateur league with teams in British Columbia.

The team plays its home matches in the Apple Bowl at the Parkinson Recreation Area, where they have played since 1995. The team's colours are red, black and white.

== History ==
The club was founded in 1989 as a registered not-for-profit society with the aim of providing a level of senior soccer not previously available in Kelowna.

The team competes in the Pacific Coast Soccer League. They were finalists in the 1995 play-offs, league champions and play-off winners in 1997 and 1998, finalists 2004 play-offs and semi-finalists in 2005. In its twentieth year the Challenge won the regular 2009 PCSL season title, the post-season title and the John F. Kennedy Cup. The Kennedy Cup is a tournament between the best British Columbia, Oregon and Washington State men's teams. In 1998 the Challenge was chosen as Kelowna’s Athletic Team of the Year, and runner-up in 2010 at the Kelowna Civic Awards.

The club has been involved in summer soccer camps for many hundreds of youth players almost every year since 1992.

Well-known players and coaches of the team have included Ian Bridge, Shaun Lowther, Pat Onstad and Rob Friend, who have all been Canadian National Soccer Team members.

The team usually comprises ten to fifteen local players augmented by four to seven players from out of town.

== Year-by-year ==
Year	Division	League	Reg. season	Playoffs	Open Canada Cup
1995	4	PCSL	2nd		Did not qualify
1996	4	PCSL	4th		Did not qualify
1997	4	PCSL	1st		Did not qualify
1998	4	PCSL	1st		Did not qualify
1999	4	PCSL	4th		Did not qualify
2000	4	PCSL	5th		Did not qualify
2001	4	PCSL	on hiatus		
2002	4	PCSL	7th		Did not qualify
2003	4	PCSL	9th		Did not qualify
2004	4	PCSL	4th		Did not qualify
2005	4	PCSL	3rd, South	Did not qualify	Did not qualify
2006	4	PCSL	9th		Did not qualify
2007	4	PCSL	6th		Did not qualify
2008	4	PCSL	10th		Did not qualify
2009	4	PCSL	1st	1st	Champions
2010	4	PCSL	3rd	2nd	
2011	4	PCSL	4th	1st	
2012	4	PCSL	9th		Did not qualify

== Honours ==
- Sheila Anderson Memorial (Challenge) Cup Winners: 1997, 2009, 2011
- John F. Kennedy Trophy (Kennedy Cup) Winners 2009
- PCSL Champions: 1997, 1998, 2009

== Head coach ==
- (United States) Kelly Wolverton

== Stadiums ==
- Apple Bowl; Kelowna, British Columbia (1995–2012)
