= Pacific Coast Soccer League =

Canadian amateur soccer league

- Founded: 1995
- Country: Canada
- Confederation: CONCACAF; British Columbia Soccer Association
- Number of clubs: 11
- Domestic cup(s): Sheila Anderson Memorial Cup
- Current champions: League: Khalsa Sporting Club; Cup: Khalsa Sporting Club (2018)
- Most championships: League: Victoria United (5 titles); Cup: Victoria United (7 titles)
- Website: PCSL.org

The Pacific Coast Soccer League is an amateur soccer league, currently featuring teams from British Columbia. In the past, clubs from Washington and Oregon have competed. The Pacific Coast Soccer League is a recognized fourth-division league in the American Soccer Pyramid which features teams from western Canada and the Pacific Northwest.

The league has a short, 2.5-month summer season. The league winners are not eligible for any higher cup competitions; however, most players participate in a winter league, such as the VMSL, VISL or FVSL, where teams do participate in BC Provincial Cup qualification. Several clubs are directly affiliated and managed by local university soccer programs looking to keep their players in form and build team chemistry over the off-season.

The league fielded both men's and women's premier and reserve leagues with varying numbers of teams until 2014 when the league was reduced to one men's division. The current PCSL was reconstituted thereafter as a separate entity in 1995. Since 1989, the highest ranking PCSL Canadian team plays for the John F. Kennedy Cup against the Oregon Adult Soccer Association champion and the Washington State Adult Soccer Association champion.

As of 2017, the PCSL no longer operates a men's reserve division, or any women's divisions. After a four-year hiatus, John F. Kennedy Cup matches were announced to resume in 2018, with two British Columbia teams facing off against teams from Oregon.

== Teams ==
=== Men's Premier ===
Following teams are listed with the league for the 2022 season.

Teams	Affiliation	City	Home field	Manager
FC Tigers Vancouver		Burnaby, British Columbia	Burnaby Lake Field	(Iran) Farivar Torabi
Kamloops Rivers FC 2	Rivers FC	Kamloops, British Columbia	Hillside Stadium	(Germany) Jost Hausendorf
Khalsa Sporting Club		New Westminster, British Columbia	Queen's Park Stadium	(Canada) Parm Gill
Mid-Isle Mariners	Vancouver Island University Men's Soccer	Nanaimo, British Columbia	Nanaimo District Secondary School	(Canada) Jeff Howe
Okanagan FC		Kelowna, British Columbia	Apple Bowl	(Canada) Andrew Stevenson
Penticton Pinnacles	Excelsior Rotterdam	Penticton, British Columbia	King's Park	(Canada) Dale Anderson
Phytogen Koinonia		Coquitlam, British Columbia	Towncentre Stadium	(South Korea) Kyung-hun Gee
Victoria United FC	University of Victoria	Victoria, British Columbia	Centennial Stadium	(Canada) Nico Craveiro
Westcastle International Academy		Victoria, British Columbia	Starlight Stadium	(Zimbabwe) Eddie Mukahanana
Fusion FC		Richmond, British Columbia	Hugh Boyd Secondary School	(Canada) Steve Millar
Port Moody SC		Port Moody, British Columbia	Trasolini Field	(Canada) Srdjan Djekanovic

== Champions ==
=== Men – The George Cambridge Memorial League Cup ===
- 1981 Croatia AFC
- 1982 Vancouver Whitecaps "B"
- 1983 Croatia FC
- 1984 New Westminster QPR
- 1985 Croatia SC
- 1986 Croatia SC
- 1987 Croatia SC
- 1988 ICSF Columbus
- 1989 ICSF Columbus
- 1990 Croatia SC
- 1991 Croatia SC
- 1992 WSSA Selects
- 1993 Croatia SC
- 1994 UBC Alumni
- 1995 Victoria United
- 1996 Seattle Hibernian and Caledonian Saints
- 1997 Okanagan Challenge
- 1998 Okanagan Challenge
- 1999 Seattle Hibernian and Caledonian Saints
- 2000 Seattle Hibernian and Caledonian Saints
- 2001 Seattle Hibernian and Caledonian Saints
- 2002 Victoria United
- 2003 New Westminster Khalsa Sporting
- 2004 Victoria United
- 2005 Victoria United
- 2006 Whitecaps FC Reserves
- 2007 Victoria United
- 2008 Victoria United
- 2009 Okanagan Challenge
- 2010 Vancouver Thunderbirds
- 2011 Vancouver Thunderbirds
- 2012 Vancouver Thunderbirds
- 2013 Khalsa Sporting Club
- 2014 Khalsa Sporting Club
- 2015 Vancouver United FC
- 2016 Vancouver Thunderbirds
- 2017 Vancouver United FC
- 2018 Khalsa Sporting Club
- 2019 Victoria Highlander Reserves
- 2022 Okanagan FC
- 2023 Victoria United

=== Reserve Men ===
- 2006 Victoria United
- 2007 Norvan SC
- 2008 Victoria United
- 2009 Okanagan Whitecaps FC
- 2010 Vancouver FC
- 2011 Coquitlam Metro-Ford SC
- 2012 Kamloops Heat
- 2013 Abbotsford Metro-Ford Mariners
- 2014 Mid Isle Highlanders

=== Women – The Jacques Moon Memorial League Cup ===
- 1999 Vancouver Explorers
- 2000 Portland Rain
- 2001 Seattle Hibernian and Caledonian Saints
- 2002 Seattle Hibernian and Caledonian Saints
- 2003 Seattle Hibernian and Caledonian Saints
- 2004 Seattle Hibernian and Caledonian Saints
- 2005 Victoria Stars
- 2006 Whitecaps Reserves
- 2007 Whitecaps Reserves
- 2008 Victoria Stars
- 2009 Fraser Valley Action
- 2010 Whitecaps Prospects
- 2011 Vancouver Thunderbirds
- 2012 Fraser Valley Action
- 2013 Vancouver Whitecaps FC
- 2014 Peninsula Co-op Highlanders

=== Reserve Women – The Len McAdams League Cup ===
- 2006 North Shore Eagles Stars
- 2007 Penticton Pinnacles
- 2008 Tri-Cities Xtreme
- 2009 Kamloops Heat
- 2010 Fraser Valley Action
- 2011 Kamloops Heat
- 2012 West Vancouver FC
- 2013 TSS Academy Black
- 2014 Peninsula Co-op Highlanders FC

== Challenge Cup winners ==
The Challenge Cup is with the top four teams, or the host team and the top three, competing in a straight knockout tournament seeded by league standings.

=== Men – The Sheila Anderson Memorial (Challenge) Cup ===
- 1995 Victoria United
- 1996 Victoria United
- 1997 Okanagan Challenge
- 1998 Victoria United
- 1999 Seattle Hibernian and Caledonian Saints
- 2000 New Westminster Sporting Khalsa
- 2001 Surrey United
- 2002 New Westminster Sporting Khalsa
- 2003 New Westminster Sporting Khalsa
- 2004 Victoria United
- 2005 New Westminster Sporting Khalsa
- 2006 Victoria United
- 2007 Victoria United
- 2008 Victoria United
- 2009 Okanagan Challenge
- 2010 Vancouver Thunderbirds
- 2011 Okanagan Challenge
- 2012 Vancouver Thunderbirds
- 2013 Vancouver Thunderbirds
- 2014 Khalsa Sporting Club
- 2015 Khalsa Sporting Club
- 2016 Vancouver Thunderbirds
- 2017 Vancouver United FC
- 2018 Khalsa Sporting Club
- 2022 Port Moody Soccer Club

=== Women – The Dave Fryatt Challenge Cup ===
- 2001 Seattle Hibernian and Caledonian Saints
- 2002 Surrey United
- 2003 Tri-Cities Xtreme
- 2004 Tri-Cities Xtreme
- 2005 Seattle Hibernian and Caledonian Saints
- 2006 Whitecaps Women Reserves
- 2007 FC Xtreme
- 2008 Victoria Stars
- 2009 Whitecaps Prospects
- 2011 Vancouver Thunderbirds
- 2012 Fraser Valley Action
- 2013 Vancouver Whitecaps FC
- 2014 Peninsula Co-op Highlanders

=== Reserve Men ===
- 2014 Victoria Highlanders
- 2013 Penticton Pinnacles
- 2012 Victoria United
- 2011 Okanagan FC
- 2010 Vancouver FC
- 2009 Okanagan WFC
- 2008 Chilliwack FC Royal Racing
- 2007 Fraser Valley Action
- 2006 Victoria United

=== Reserve Women – Bill Gillespie Challenge Cup ===
- 2008 Tri-Cities Xtreme
- 2009 Penticton Pinnacles
- 2010 TSS Academy
- 2011 Fraser Valley Action
- 2012 Kelowna United
- 2013 Penticton Pinnacles
- 2014 Penticton Pinnacles

== Former men's PCSL teams ==
=== Modern era ===
- 86ers Reserves (1995–1996)
- Abbotsford Athletes in Action (1995–2001)
- Abbotsford Magnuson-Ford SC (2014–2015)
- ASA Devils (2018)
- Athletic Club of BC (2010)
- Bellingham Marlins (1998–1999)
- Columbus Clan F.C. (2005)
- Coquitlam Metro-Ford SC (2012–2014)
- EDC Burnaby (2013–2014)
- Fiji Saints (1995)
- FK Pacific (2006–2007)
- Fraser Valley Action (2002–2009)
- Ismaili (1995)
- Kamloops City Blaze (2004–2005)
- Kamloops Excel (2010–2011)
- Kamloops Heat (1995–1999, 2013–2016)
- Langley Athletic (2012)
- Mid-Isle Highlanders FC (2011)
- Okanagan Challenge (1995–2012)
- Peace Arch United (2007–2008)
- Penticton Pinnacles (1997–2006)
- PoCo City FC (2012)
- Port Moody SC (2017)
- PSSA Rapids (2001–2008)
- Richmond Clan (2004)
- Seattle Hibernian Saints (1995–2006)
- Seattle Wolves (2008)
- Surrey Eagles (2014)
- Surrey United (1999–2009, 2011)
- Team BC (2001–2003)
- UBC Alumni (1995)
- Vancouver Explorers (1998–2002)
- Vancouver Thunderbirds (2010–2017)
- Vancouver United FC (2016–2018)
- Victoria United (1995–2014)
- Whitecaps FC Reserves (2005–2006)
- Whitecaps FC Prospects (2008–2009)

== Former women's PCSL teams ==
- Abbotsford Athletes in Action (1999–2001)
- Bellingham Marlins (1999)
- Hibernian & Caledonian (1999–2005)
- Kamloops City (2005)
- Kamloops UCC Alumni (1999–2003)
- Kelowna United (2008)
- Okanagan Challenge (1999–2000, 2004)
- Okanagan Predators (2002–2003)
- Portland Rain (2000–2003)
- PSSA Rapids (2007–2008)
- Semiahmoo SC (2008–2010)
- Skagit Valley (2000)
- Sportstown TSS (2005)
- Surrey United (2001–2009)
- Tacoma Pride (2000–2001)
- Team BC (2001–2003)
- Vancouver Explorers (1999–2000)
- Vancouver Thunderbirds (2006)
