= Coquitlam Metro-Ford SC =

- Full name: Coquitlam Metro-Ford Soccer Club
- Founded: 1984
- Stadium: Percy Perry Stadium
- Capacity: 2,100
- League: BC Coastal Soccer League, BC Soccer Premier League, Vancouver Metro Soccer League

Coquitlam Metro-Ford Soccer Club (CMFSC) is a Canadian soccer club based in Coquitlam, British Columbia. Its youth teams play in the BC Coastal Soccer League and the BC Soccer Premier League. Its senior teams play in the Vancouver Metro Soccer League. The club primarily plays its home matches at Percy Perry Stadium.

== History ==
Coquitlam Metro-Ford Soccer Club was founded in 2007 as a merger between Metro-Ford Soccer Club and Coquitlam City Soccer Association. Both clubs were originally founded in 1984.

The Coquitlam Metro-Ford Soccer Club senior men's team, Wolves, have won the Men's Provincial A Cup twice, the Vancouver Metro Soccer League Premier Division five times, and the Imperial Cup once.

Since the merger in 2007, its boy's teams have won the Provincial Premier Cup 11 times, the Provincial A Cup six times, and the Provincial B Cup twice.

In 2024, it was announced that Coquitlam Metro-Ford will be participating in League1 BC as Evolution FC starting in 2025.

== Colours and badge ==
The Coquitlam Metro-Ford badge includes aspects from the two clubs that merged. According to the club's website, "The Coquitlam Metro-Ford Soccer Club logo is built around a shield which reflects the Club's stability, longevity, and tradition. The blue and black stripes are a tribute to Inter Milan, a passion of one of the Club's founders. These stripes continue to honour our past while reflecting excellence and distinction. The words, 'Soccer for Life', are inscribed in the centre as a call to action and reminder to all that our goal is to inspire a passion for the game that evolves into lifelong involvement - playing, parenting, coaching, refereeing, and/or volunteering in support of the club and our community."

== Stadium ==
The club plays the majority of its home matches at Town Centre Park, but its teams also play at Dr. Charles Best Secondary and Centennial Secondary.

== Senior Honours ==
=== CMFSC Wolves ===
- Men's Provincial A Cup
  - Winners (2): 1994, 1999, 2024
- Vancouver Metro Soccer League Premier Division
  - Winners (5): 1989, 1992, 1993, 2016, 2017
- Imperial Cup
  - Winners (1): 2016
