= 2008 Vancouver Whitecaps FC season =

Vancouver Whitecaps FC 2008 soccer season

Vancouver Whitecaps
2008 season
- Owner: Greg Kerfoot, Jeff Mallet, Steve Luczo, Steve Nash
- Head coach: Teitur Thordarson
- USL-1: 2nd
- USL-1 Playoffs: Champions
- Canadian Championship: 3rd
- Highest home attendance: 5,822; Oct 12 vs Puerto Rico Islanders
- Lowest home attendance: 4,412; June 25 vs Montreal Impact
- Average home league attendance: 4,999
Home colours	Away colours

The 2008 Vancouver Whitecaps season was the club's 23rd year of existence (or 33rd if counting the NASL Whitecaps), as well as their 16th as a Division 2 club in the franchise model of US-based soccer leagues. With games against well supported MLS side Toronto FC in the Voyageurs Cup and local rival Seattle Sounders selling 22,000 season tickets for MLS in 2009, the Vancouver Whitecaps were marketed as one of the leading markets for a 2011 MLS expansion side. This included expanding the ownership to include Victoria, BC raised NBA star Steve Nash in July. The Division 1 MLS speculation along with the higher profile that came with public negotiations with Vancouver City Council and the Port of Metro Vancouver to develop the Whitecaps Waterfront Stadium gave a boost to media coverage and game attendances. The privately financed stadium, first proposed in 2006, appeared to be reaching its final government land use approvals in 2008.

The 2008 season started in a strong fashion with two losses in their first ten games as new coach Teitur Thordarson maintained the defensive style of previous coach Bob Lilley to grind out results. The USL-1 league was a closely contested affair with eleven points separating 11th and third in the standings. However, the top two teams, the Whitecaps and Puerto Rico were a further ten points clear of third place. The Commissioner's Cup was a contest between the Whitecaps, who finished runner-up by one point, and the Puerto Rico Islanders. The Whitecaps almost squandered a 5-1 aggregate league by letting the Minnesota Thunder back into the second leg of the USL-1 play in round, but held on for a 5-4 aggregate win. In the semi-final series against Montreal Impact they ground out a first leg 1-0 loss after their goal keeper was ejected. The Whitecaps deservedly won the second leg 2-0 at home to go through 2-1 on aggregate to the final against Puerto Rico Islanders. The playoff final was a back and forth game in which the Whitecaps prevailed 2-1 in front of 5,822 at their long time home of Swangard Stadium.

This was the first year of the official tournament for the Voyageurs Cup also known as the Canadian Championship as CONCACAF designated a Canadian spot in the new champions league structure of the CONCACAF Champions Cup. The Whitecaps finished third in the 2008 Voyaguers Cup with two losses to Montreal and a draw and a win over Division 1 MLS side Toronto FC.

== Schedule and results ==
=== Tables ===
Commissioner's Cup, bye to semifinal round of playoffs
First round of playoffs

Pos	Club	Pts	Pld	W	D	L	GF	GA	GD	H2H Pts
1	Puerto Rico Islanders	54	30	15	9	6	43	23	+20	
2	Vancouver Whitecaps	53	30	15	8	7	34	28	+6	
3	Montreal Impact	42	30	12	6	12	33	28	+5	
4	Rochester Rhinos	41^{†}	30	11	9	10	35	32	+3	
5	Charleston Battery	40	30	11	7	12	34	36	−2	CHA: 4 pts SEA: 4 pts
6	Seattle Sounders	40	30	10	10	10	37	36	+1	CHA: 4 pts SEA: 4 pts
7	Minnesota Thunder	39	30	10	9	11	40	38	+2	
8	Carolina RailHawks	37	30	9	10	11	34	43	−9	
9	Miami FC	34	30	8	10	12	28	34	−6	MIA: 7 pts ATL: 1 pt
10	Atlanta Silverbacks	34	30	8	10	12	37	50	−13	MIA: 7 pts ATL: 1 pt
11	Portland Timbers	31	30	7	10	13	26	33	−7	

Tie-breaker order: 1. Head-to-head points; 2. Total wins; 3. Goal difference; 4. Goals for; 5. Lottery
^{†} Rochester deducted 1 point for use of an ineligible player on August 10, 2008

Overall								Home						Away					
Pld	Pts	W	L	T	GF	GA	GD	W	L	T	GF	GA	GD	W	L	T	GF	GA	GD
30	53	15	7	8	34	28	+6	8	2	5	17	10	+7	7	5	3	17	18	−1

Last updated: April 26, 2010
Source: uslsoccer.com
Pld = Matches played; Pts = Points; W = Matches won; T = Matches tied; L = Matches lost; GF = Goals for; GA = Goals against; GD = Goal difference

=== Pre-season ===
Win Draw Loss

March 9, 2008	UVic Vikes	0–0	Vancouver Whitecaps FC	Victoria, British Columbia
15:00 PST		Report		Stadium: Centennial Stadium, Attendance: 500

March 20, 2008	Vancouver Whitecaps FC	4–0	Portland Timbers	Seattle, WA
	Steve Kindel; Nicholas Addlery; Own goal Stefan Leslie	Report		Stadium: Starfire Sports Complex

March 22, 2008	Seattle Sounders FC	1–2	Vancouver Whitecaps FC	Seattle, WA
19:00 PST	Roger Levesque 44'	Report	Jason Jordan 15'; Eduardo Sebrango 64'	Stadium: Starfire Sports Complex; Attendance: 752

March 29, 2008	Simon Fraser University	0–3	Vancouver Whitecaps FC	New Westminster, BC
10:00 PST		Report	Eduardo Sebrango 6'; Nick Webb 19'; Jason Jordan 85'	Stadium: Mercer Stadium

April 2, 2008	Trinity Western University	0–3	Vancouver Whitecaps FC	Langley, BC
19:00 PST		Report	Alfredo Valente 38', 69'; Eduardo Sebrango 50'	Stadium: Spartans Sports Complex; Attendance: 2,276; Referee: Phil Barrington

=== USL-1 ===
==== Results by round ====
Round	1	2	3	4	5	6	7	8	9	10	11	12	13	14	15	16	17	18	19	20	21	22	23	24	25	26	27	28	29	30
Ground	H	H	H	A	A	H	A	A	A	H	A	H	A	H	H	A	A	A	A	A	H	H	A	H	H	A	A	H	H	A
Result	W	L	W	W	D	L	W	W	W	W	L	D	L	D	D	W	W	W	L	L	W	D	D	W	W	D	L	D	W	W

Source: uslsoccer.com
A = Away; H = Home; W = Win; D = Draw; L = Loss

April 12, 2008 1	Vancouver Whitecaps FC	1–0	Montreal Impact	Burnaby, BC
22:00 ET	Eduardo Sebrango 33'	Report		Stadium: Swangard Stadium; Attendance: 5,288

April 26, 2008 2	Vancouver Whitecaps FC	0–1	Minnesota Thunder	Burnaby, BC
22:00 ET		report	Ricardo Sánchez 68' (pen.)	Stadium: Swangard Stadium; Attendance: 4,989; Referee: Fabrizio Romano

May 10, 2008 3	Vancouver Whitecaps FC	1–0	Rochester Rhinos	Burnaby, BC
22:00 ET	Eduardo Sebrango 77'	report		Stadium: Swangard Stadium; Attendance: 4,762; Referee: Geoff Gamble

May 16, 2008 4	Miami FC Blues	0–1	Vancouver Whitecaps FC	Miami
17:30 ET		report	Eduardo Sebrango 18'	Stadium: Tropical Park Stadium; Attendance: 3,125; Referee: Shane Moody

May 19, 2008 5	Montreal Impact	0–0	Vancouver Whitecaps FC	Montreal
15:00 ET		report		Stadium: Stade Saputo; Attendance: 13,034; Referee: Dave Gantar

May 23, 2008 6	Vancouver Whitecaps FC	0–2	Seattle Sounders	Burnaby, BC
23:00 ET		report	Josh Gardner 3'; Sebastien Le Toux 7'	Stadium: Swangard Stadium; Attendance: 5,146; Referee: Justin Tasev

May 24, 2008 7	Portland Timbers	0–1	Vancouver Whitecaps FC	Portland, Oregon
22:00 ET		report	Chris Nurse 17'; Johnny Menyongar 37'	Stadium: PGE Park; Attendance: 8,688; Referee: Yader Reyes

May 28, 2008 8	Charleston Battery	0–2	Vancouver Whitecaps FC	Charleston, South Carolina
19:30 ET		report	Jason Jordan 64'; Nicholas Addlery 75'	Stadium: Blackbaud Stadium; Attendance: 2,763; Referee: Alan Schechtman

May 31, 2008 9	Minnesota Thunder	0–1	Vancouver Whitecaps FC	Minneapolis
20:05 ET		report	Jason Jordan 41'	Stadium: National Sports Center; Attendance: 2,369; Referee: Edwom Jureievic

June 7, 2008 10	Vancouver Whitecaps FC	3–1	Portland Timbers	Burnaby, BC
22:00 ET	Eduardo Sebrango 54'; Martin Nash 66'; Alfredo Valente 90'	report	Scot Thompson 9'	Stadium: Swangard Stadium; Attendance: 5,288; Referee: Jonathan Lavergne

June 13, 2008 11	Rochester Rhinos	3–0	Vancouver Whitecaps FC	Rochester, New York
20:00 ET	Mauricio Salles 32', 62'; Johnny Menyongar 46'	report		Stadium: Marina Auto Stadium; Attendance: 7,471; Referee: Joe Caroccio

June 22, 2008 12	Vancouver Whitecaps FC	1–1	Miami FC Blues	Burnaby, BC
22:00 ET	Juan Pablo Galavis 20'	report	Chris Pozniak 51'	Stadium: Swangard Stadium; Attendance: 5,288; Referee: Mathieu Bourdeau

July 5, 2008 13	Rochester Rhinos	1–3	Vancouver Whitecaps FC	Rochester, New York
19:35 ET	Lyle Martin 7'; Martin Nash 71'; Charles Gbeke 79'; Marcus Haber 81'	report		Stadium: Marina Auto Stadium; Attendance: 7,356; Referee: Fernando Iturriaga

July 13, 2008 14	Vancouver Whitecaps FC	2–1	Carolina RailHawks FC	Burnaby, BC
22:00 ET	Eduardo Sebrango 75'	report	Dan Antoniuk 74'	Stadium: Swangard Stadium; Attendance: 4,989; Referee: Mathieu Bourdea

July 23, 2008 15	Vancouver Whitecaps FC	1–1	Charleston Battery	Burnaby, BC
22:00 ET	Charles Gbeke 81'	report	Randi Patterson	Stadium: Swangard Stadium; Attendance: 5,038; Referee: Jonathan Lavergne

July 26, 2008 16	Vancouver Whitecaps FC	1–0	Carolina RailHawks FC	Burnaby, BC
22:00 ET	Eduardo Sebrango 12'	report		Stadium: Swangard Stadium; Attendance: 4,991; Referee: Geoff Gamble

July 29, 2008 17	Miami FC Blues	1–2	Vancouver Whitecaps FC	Miami
19:30 ET	Alex Afonso 61'	report	Eduardo Sebrango 57'; Alfredo Valente 81'	Stadium: Tropical Park Stadium; Attendance: 958; Referee: Ben Chouaf

August 1, 2008 18	Carolina RailHawks FC	3–2	Vancouver Whitecaps FC	Cary, North Carolina
20:00 ET	Santiago Fusilier 18'; Martin Nunez 83'	report	Charles Gbeke 2'; Omar Jarun 10'; Eduardo Sebrango 35'	Stadium: WakeMed Soccer Park; Attendance: 3,856; Referee: Mark Kadlecik

August 3, 2008 19	Charleston Battery	2–0	Vancouver Whitecaps FC	Charleston, South Carolina
18:00 ET	Osvaldo Alonso 10', 61' (pen.)	report		Stadium: Blackbaud Stadium; Attendance: 3,769

August 5, 2008 20	Atlanta Silverbacks	2–3	Vancouver Whitecaps FC	Atlanta
19:55 ET	Tony McManus 37'; Macoumba Kandji 53'; Jerson Monteiro 65'	report	Luca Bellisomo 31'; Admir Salihovic 79'	Stadium: RE/MAX Greater Atlanta Stadium; Attendance: 1,941

August 10, 2008 21	Vancouver Whitecaps FC	3–2	Atlanta Silverbacks	Burnaby, BC
19:00 ET	Jeff Clarke 25'; Eduardo Sebrango 72', 88'	report	Ansu Toure 20', 39'	Stadium: Swangard Stadium; Attendance: 4,689; Referee: Carol Anne Chenard

August 17, 2008 22	Vancouver Whitecaps FC	0–0	Carolina RailHawks FC	Burnaby, BC
22:00 ET		report		Stadium: Swangard Stadium; Attendance: 4,563; Referee: Geoff Gamble

August 20, 2008 23	Seattle Sounders	0–0	Vancouver Whitecaps FC	Tukwila, Washington
19:30 ET		report		Stadium: Starfire Sports Complex; Attendance: 3,203; Referee: Ben Chouaf

August 22, 2008 24	Vancouver Whitecaps FC	2–1	Portland Timbers	Burnaby, BC
23:00 ET	Nick Addlery 3', 43'	report	Lawrence Olum 12'	Stadium: Swangard Stadium; Attendance: 4,761; Referee: Mathieu Bourdeau

August 27, 2008 25	Vancouver Whitecaps FC	2–0	Atlanta Silverbacks	Burnaby, BC
22:00 ET	Lyle Martin 35'; Eduardo Sebrango 69'	report		Stadium: Swangard Stadium; Attendance: 4,621; Referee: Dave Gantar

August 31, 2008 26	Puerto Rico Islanders	1–1	Vancouver Whitecaps FC	Bayamón, Puerto Rico
18:00 ET	Kendall Jagdeosingh 67'	report	Takashi Hirano 86'	Stadium: Juan Ramón Loubriel Stadium; Attendance: 3,227; Referee: Lee Suckle

September 5, 2008 27	Puerto Rico Islanders	1–0	Vancouver Whitecaps FC	Bayamón, Puerto Rico
20:00 ET	Noah Delgado 89'	report		Stadium: Juan Ramón Loubriel Stadium; Attendance: 5,255; Referee: Ben Chouaf

September 7, 2008 28	Vancouver Whitecaps FC	0–0	Minnesota Thunder	Burnaby, BC
22:00 ET		report		Stadium: Swangard Stadium; Attendance: 5,288; Referee: Fabrizio Romano

September 13, 2008 29	Vancouver Whitecaps FC	1–0	Montreal Impact	Burnaby, BC
22:00 ET	Charles Gbeke 45'	report		Stadium: Swangard Stadium; Attendance: 5,288; Referee: Dave Gantar

September 20, 2008 30	Seattle Sounders	2–3	Vancouver Whitecaps FC	Tukwila, Washington
22:00 ET	Sebastien Le Toux 10'; Kevin Sakuda 69'	report	Eduardo Sebrango 54'; Justin Moose 57'; Jeff Clarke 67'	Stadium: Starfire Sports Complex; Attendance: 4,401; Referee: Landis Wiley

==== Post-season ====
Play-in Round

September 26, 2008 Leg 1	Vancouver Whitecaps FC	2–0	Minnesota Thunder	Burnaby, BC
22:00 ET	Jon Greenfield 27' (o.g.); Eduardo Sebrango (yellow card) 58'; Takashi Hirano (yellow card) 73'; Justin Moose 89'	report	Mark Schulte (yellow card) 31'; Brian Cvilikas (yellow card) 76'	Stadium: Swangard Stadium; Attendance: 4,943; Referee: Carol Anne Chenard

September 28, 2008 Leg 2	Minnesota Thunder	4–3 (4–5 agg.)	Vancouver Whitecaps FC	Minneapolis
18:05 ET	Luchi Gonzalez 23'; Melvin Tarley 64', (yellow card) 73'; Ricardo Sánchez (red card) 77'; Stephen deRoux 78'; Frederico Moojen 90' (pen.); Mark Schulte (yellow card) 90'	report	Alfredo Valente 3'; Martin Nash 44'; Eduardo Sebrango 55'	Stadium: National Sports Center; Attendance: 3,811

Semi-finals

October 3, 2008 Leg 1	Montreal Impact	1–0	Vancouver Whitecaps FC	Montreal
20:00 ET	Antonio Ribeiro (yellow card) 52', (goal) 61'; Pato Aguilera (yellow card) 88'	report	Wesley Charles (yellow card) 29'; Jay Nolly (red card) 52'	Stadium: Stade Saputo; Attendance: 12,002; Referee: Steve DePiero

October 5, 2008 Leg 2	Vancouver Whitecaps FC	2–0 (2–1 agg.)	Montreal Impact	Burnaby, BC
18:30 ET	Justin Moose (yellow card) 10'; Jeff Clarke 37'; Eduardo Sebrango 41'; Wesley Charles (yellow card) 56'; Nicholas Addlery (yellow card) 81'	report	David Testo (yellow card) 40'; Nevio Pizzolitto (yellow card) 48'; Simon Gatti (yellow card) 64'; Adam Braz (yellow card) 80'	Stadium: Swangard Stadium; Attendance: 4,992; Referee: Dave Gantar

Final

October 12, 2008	Vancouver Whitecaps FC	2–1	Puerto Rico Islanders	Burnaby, BC
19:00 ET	Charles Gbeke 55', 74'; Steve Kindel (yellow card) 71'	report	Sandy Gbandi 68'	Stadium: Swangard Stadium; Attendance: 5,822; Referee: Mark Kadlecik

=== Canadian Championship ===
==== Canadian Championship standings ====
Pos	Team	Pld	W	D	L	GF	GA	GD	Pts	Qualification
1	Montreal Impact (C)	4	2	1	1	5	2	+3	7	Champions League
2	Toronto FC	4	1	2	1	4	4	0	5	
3	Vancouver Whitecaps	4	1	1	2	3	6	−3	4	

Source: Canada Soccer
Rules for classification: 1) points; 2) goal differential; 3) number of goals scored; 4) drawing of lots.
(C) Champions

==== Canadian Championship results ====
June 17, 2008 1	Montreal Impact	2–0	Vancouver Whitecaps FC	Saputo Stadium, Montreal
19:30 EDT	Severino Jefferson 25'; Joey Gjertsen 35'	Report		Attendance: 10,054; Referee: Silviu Petrescu

June 25, 2008 2	Vancouver Whitecaps FC	0–2	Montreal Impact	Swangard Stadium, Burnaby, British Columbia
23:00 EDT		Report	Roberto Brown 30'; David Testo 66'	Attendance: 4,412; Referee: Domenic Scali

July 1, 2008 3	Toronto FC	0–1	Vancouver Whitecaps FC	BMO Field, Toronto, Ontario
16:00 EDT		Report	Martin Nash 36' (pen.)	Attendance: 18,938; Referee: Steve Depiero

July 9, 2008 4	Vancouver Whitecaps FC	2–2	Toronto FC	Swangard Stadium, Burnaby, British Columbia
19:30 PDT	Eduardo Sebrango 43', 87'	Report	Maurice Edu 61'; Rohan Ricketts 76'	Attendance: 5,228; Referee: Carol-Ann Chénard

=== Cascadia Cup ===
2008 Cascadia Cup
Team	Pld	W	L	D	GF	GA	GD	Pts
Vancouver Whitecaps	6	4	1	1	9	6	+3	13
Seattle Sounders	6	2	2	2	5	5	0	8
Portland Timbers	6	1	4	1	4	7	−3	4

Source: "Cascadia Cup". cascadiacup.soccer. January 2008.

==== Friendlies ====
May 13, 2008 1	Vancouver Whitecaps FC	2–1	Los Angeles Galaxy	Edmonton, Alberta
19:00 ET	Nicholas Addlery 4'; Eduardo Sebrango	Report	Alan Gordon 43'	Stadium: Commonwealth Stadium; Attendance: 37,104

== Roster ==
After the 2007 season, the Whitecaps and coach Bob Lilley parted ways with the Whitecaps hiring Teitur Thordarson. Many local long time stalwart veteran players such as Jeff Clarke, Jason Jordan, Steve Kindel, Geordie Lyall, Martin Nash, and Alfredo Valente remained on the roster. Leading striker Eduardo Sebrango also was back for another year with the new coach.

The Whitecaps signed Jamaican striker Nicholas Addlery, US keeper Jay Nolly, Omar Jarun, Japanese international Takashi Hirano, and Bolivian youth international Vicente Arze.

=== Staff ===
- Head coach – Teitur Thordarson
- Assistant coach – Todd Wawrousek
- Manager communications – Nathan Vanstone
- Director of professional teams – Greg Anderson
- Office manager – Lindsay Pucklik
- President – Bob Lenarduzzi

All stats as of the end of the season.

=== Goalkeeper stats ===
No.	Nat.	Player	Total					USL-1					Playoffs				
No.	Nat.	Player	MIN	SV	GA	GAA	SO	MIN	SV	GA	GAA	SO	MIN	SV	GA	GAA	SO
1	(United States)	Jay Nolly	2070	81	24	1.043	9	2070	81	24	1.043	9	325	19	5	1.38	1
29	(Canada)	Srdjan Djekanovic	630	23	4'	0.57	4	630	23	4	0.57	4	0	0	0	0	0
0	(Canada)	Tyler Baldock	0	0	0	0.00	0	0	0	0	0.00	0	125	6	1	0.72	1

|} Updated to match played February 20, 2014

=== Player statistics ===
No.	Pos.	Name	Apps	Minutes	Goals	Assists	Shots	Fouls	Yellow card	Red card			
No.	Pos.	Name	0	GK	(Canada) Tyler Baldock	1(1)	125	0	0	0	0	0	0
1	GK	(United States) Jay Nolly	27	2395	0	0	0	0	3	1			
2	DF	(Canada) Jeff Clarke	20(1)	1743	3	2	9	16	4	0			
3	MF	(United States) Nick Webb	0(4)	40	0	0	0	1	0	0			
4	DF	(Canada) Adrian Cann	8	720	0	0	1	14	1	0			
4	DF	(Saint Vincent and the Grenadines) Wesley Charles	15(1)	1321	0	1	1	14	3	0			
6	DF	(Canada) Luca Bellisomo	9(2)	807	1	1	3	11	2	0			
7	MF	(Canada) Martin Nash	33	2896	1	3	25	28	4	0			
8	DF	(Canada) Steve Kindel	27(3)	2445	0	2	17	37	6	0			
9	MF	(Canada) Alfredo Valente	25(6)	2046	2	2	33	26	5	1			
11	FW	(Jamaica) Nicholas Addlery	16(12)	1440	4	1	44	32	8	1			
12	FW	(Cuba) Eduardo Sebrango	31	2548	13	3	76	33	4	1			
13	DF	(Canada) Geordie Lyall	5(1)	312	0	0	1	6	0	0			
13	MF	(United States) Mason Webb	0(2)	23	0	0	0	0	0	0			
14	MF	(United States) Tony Donatelli	6(4)	480	0	1	10	8	1	0			
15	DF	(Palestine) Omar Jarun	21(4)	1945	1	1	13	43	8	1			
17	FW	(Canada) Randy Edwini-Bonsu	0(4)	36	0	0	2	1	0	0			
18	DF	(Canada) Mason Trafford	5(10)	570	0	0	3	8	0	0			
19	MF	(Canada) Chris Pozniak	6(1)	570	1	1	4	11	1	0			
20	MF	(Canada) Ethan Gage	2(6)	445	0	0	5	12	0	0			
20	FW	(Canada) Charles Gbeke	10(7)	783	5	3	26	28	2	0			
20	FW	(Jamaica) Dever Orgill	(1)	38	0	0	1	1	0	0			
20	MF	(Iran) Navid Mashinchi	(1)	6	0	0	0	0	0	0			
22	DF	(Japan) Takashi Hirano	16(7)	1762	1	0	6	24	4	0			
23	MF	(Bolivia) Vicente Arze	8(18)	1097	1	2	25	24	3	0			
24	DF	(United States) Lyle Martin	25(2)	2283	1	5	8	27	1	0			
25	MF	(Bermuda) Tyrell Burgess	11(14)	1047	1	2	28	15	2	0			
25	MF	(United States) Justin Moose	16(8)	1564	2	4	15	26	7	0			
26	FW	(Canada) Jason Jordan	5(20)	897	2	3	18	9	1	0			
27	MF	(Canada) Stefan Leslie	0(6)	70	0	0	0	0	0	0			
28	DF	(Canada) Diaz Kambere	8(2)	684	0	0	4	6	0	0			
29	GK	(Canada) Srdjan Djekanovic	7	630	0	0	0	0	0	0			
29	GK	(Trinidad and Tobago) Richard Goddard	0	0	0	0	0	0	0	0			
29	MF	(Bosnia and Herzegovina) Admir Salihovic	1(3)	88	1	0	2	2	0	0			
31	GK	(Canada) Simon Thomas	0	0	0	0	0	0	0	0			
—	–	Opponent Own goals	–	–	1	–	–	–	–	–			

Updated February 28, 2014

- Note this list includes only players that have dressed in the eighteen.
- Note brackets indicate substitute appearances.
- Note statistics are for league and playoffs (not preseason). Voyageurs Cup statistics appear to no longer be available.
