= 2008 Canadian Championship =

2008 professional soccer tournament

2008 Nutrilite Canadian Championship (in English) Championnat Canadien Nutrilite 2008 (in French)

Tournament details
- Country: Canada
- Date: May 27 – July 22
- Teams: 3 (from 2 leagues)

Final positions
- Champions: Montreal Impact (1st title)
- Runners-up: Toronto FC
- Third place: Vancouver Whitecaps

Tournament statistics
- Matches played: 6
- Goals scored: 12 (2 per match)
- Attendance: 70,882 (11,814 per match)
- Top goal scorer(s): Roberto Brown; Rohan Ricketts; Eduardo Sebrango (2 goals each)

Awards
- George Gross Memorial Trophy: Matt Jordan

The 2008 Canadian Championship (officially the Nutrilite Canadian Championship for sponsorship reasons) was the first edition of the Canadian Championship – Canada's domestic cup competition. The soccer tournament took place in the cities of Montreal, Toronto and Vancouver from May 27 to July 22, 2008.

The tournament consisted of a home and away series between each team for a total of six matches. Participating teams were the Montreal Impact, Toronto FC, and the Vancouver Whitecaps. The winner of the tournament, Montreal, gained entry into the qualifying round of the 2008–09 CONCACAF Champions League, where they played against the Nicaraguan representative Real Estelí in a home and away series to determine entrance to the group stages.

The Montreal Impact were awarded the Voyageurs Cup trophy as winners of the tournament, the seventh occasion it had been presented.

== Media coverage ==
The 2008 Canadian Championship was broadcast by the CBC. Matches were broadcast on CBC Bold and online at CBC Sports. Nigel Reed and Jason de Vos provided commentary for the matches.

== Standings ==
Pos	Team	Pld	W	D	L	GF	GA	GD	Pts	Qualification	MTL	TOR	VAN
1	Montreal Impact (C)	4	2	1	1	5	2	+3	7	Champions League	—	0–1	2–0
2	Toronto FC	4	1	2	1	4	4	0	5		1–1	—	0–1
3	Vancouver Whitecaps	4	1	1	2	3	6	−3	4		0–2	2–2	—

Source: Canada Soccer
Rules for classification: 1) points; 2) goal differential; 3) number of goals scored; 4) drawing of lots.
(C) Champions

== Matches ==
May 27
7:30 pm EDT

Montreal Impact	0–1	Toronto FC
	Report	Vélez 72'

Saputo Stadium, Montreal, Quebec
Attendance: 12,083
Referee: Paul Ward

Montreal Impact	Toronto FC

GK	1	(United States) Matt Jordan
DF	15	(Canada) Patrick Leduc (c)
DF	16	(Italy) Stefano Pesoli	(yellow card) 37' (yellow-red card) 52'
DF	24	(Canada) Simon Gatti
DF	33	(Canada) Adam Braz
MF	7	(United States) David Testo
MF	17	(United States) Joey Gjertsen
MF	18	(Argentina) Leonardo Di Lorenzo		(substituted off) 24'
MF	19	(Bolivia) Pato Aguilera	(yellow card) 59'
FW	9	(Canada) Rocco Placentino		(substituted off) 58'
FW	21	(United States) Dwight Barnett		(substituted off) 79'
Substitutes
MF	23	(Canada) Antonio Ribeiro		(substituted on) 24'
DF	6	(Canada) Alex Surprenant		(substituted on) 58'
FW	11	(Brazil) Severino Jefferson		(substituted on) 79'
Manager
(Canada) Nick De Santis

GK	1	(Canada) Greg Sutton
DF	4	(Puerto Rico) Marco Vélez
DF	11	(Canada) Jim Brennan (c)	(yellow card) 32'
DF	16	(United States) Marvell Wynne
DF	28	(Ivory Coast) Olivier Tebily
MF	5	(Canada) Kevin Harmse	(yellow card) 50'
MF	10	(England) Rohan Ricketts
MF	32	(France) Laurent Robert
MF	33	(Wales) Carl Robinson
FW	9	(England) Danny Dichio		(substituted off) 41'
FW	96	(United States) Jeff Cunningham
Substitutes
FW	23	(New Zealand) Jarrod Smith		(substituted on) 41'
Manager
(England) John Carver

Man of the Match
(Canada) Rocco Placentino / (Puerto Rico) Marco Vélez
Assistant referees
Joe Fletcher
Amato DeLuca
Fourth official
Carol Anne Chénard

June 17
7:30 pm EDT

Montreal Impact	2–0	Vancouver Whitecaps
Jefferson 25'; Gjertsen 35'	Report

Saputo Stadium, Montreal, Quebec
Attendance: 10,054
Referee: Silviu Petrescu

Montreal Impact	Vancouver Whitecaps

GK	1	(United States) Matt Jordan
DF	5	(Canada) Nevio Pizzolito
DF	24	(Canada) Simon Gatti
DF	26	(France) Cédric Joqueviel	(substituted off) 77'
DF	33	(Canada) Adam Braz
MF	7	(United States) David Testo
MF	9	(Canada) Rocco Placentino	(substituted off) 46'
MF	15	(Canada) Patrick Leduc (c)
MF	17	(United States) Joey Gjertsen	(substituted off) 59'
MF	20	(Canada) Mauro Biello
FW	11	(Brazil) Severino Jefferson
Substitutes
MF	18	(Argentina) Leonardo Di Lorenzo	(substituted on) 46'
FW	14	(Canada) Sita-Taty Matondo	(substituted on) 59'
DF	2	(Burundi) Davy Uwimana	(substituted on) 77'
Manager
(Canada) John Limniatis

GK	1	(United States) Jay Nolly
DF	8	(Canada) Steve Kindel
DF	15	(Palestine) Omar Jarun	(yellow card) 23'
DF	19	(Canada) Chris Pozniak
DF	24	(United States) Lyle Martin
MF	7	(Canada) Martin Nash
MF	9	(Canada) Alfredo Valente		(substituted off) 60'
MF	22	(Japan) Takashi Hirano		(substituted off) 77'
MF	25	(United States) Justin Moose
FW	3	(United States) Nick Webb		(substituted off) 46'
FW	26	(Canada) Jason Jordan
Substitutes
MF	14	(United States) Tony Donatelli		(substituted on) 46'
DF	28	(Canada) Diaz Kambere		(substituted on) 60'
MF	29	(Bosnia and Herzegovina) Admir Salihović		(substituted on) 77'
Manager
(Iceland) Teitur Thordarson

Man of the Match
(United States) Joey Gjertsen / (Canada) Jason Jordan
Assistant referees
Pierre Cantave
Héctor Vergara
Fourth official
Jonathan Lavergne

June 25
8:00 pm PDT

Vancouver Whitecaps	0–2	Montreal Impact
	Report	Brown 30'; Testo 66'

Swangard Stadium, Burnaby, British Columbia
Attendance: 4,412
Referee: Domenic Scali

Vancouver Whitecaps	Montreal Impact

GK	1	(United States) Jay Nolly
DF	2	(Canada) Jeff Clarke
DF	4	(Canada) Adrian Cann	(yellow card) 40'
DF	19	(Canada) Chris Pozniak		(substituted off) 46'
DF	24	(United States) Lyle Martin
MF	7	(Canada) Martin Nash
MF	8	(Canada) Steve Kindel
MF	22	(Japan) Takashi Hirano
MF	25	(United States) Justin Moose		(substituted off) 75'
FW	11	(Jamaica) Nicholas Addlery		(substituted off) 75'
FW	16	(Cuba) Eduardo Sebrango
Substitutes
DF	28	(Canada) Diaz Kambere		(substituted on) 45'
MF	9	(Canada) Alfredo Valente		(substituted on) 75'
FW	26	(Canada) Jason Jordan		(substituted on) 75'
Manager
(Iceland) Teitur Thordarson

GK	1	(United States) Matt Jordan
DF	5	(Canada) Nevio Pizzolitto
DF	16	(Italy) Stefano Pesoli
DF	24	(Canada) Simon Gatti
DF	33	(Canada) Adam Braz
MF	7	(United States) David Testo	(yellow card) 38'
MF	9	(Canada) Rocco Placentino		(substituted off) 83'
MF	15	(Canada) Patrick Leduc	(yellow card) 58'
MF	18	(Argentina) Leonardo Di Lorenzo	(yellow card) 33'
FW	10	(Panama) Roberto Brown	(yellow card) 54'	(substituted off) 67'
FW	11	(Brazil) Severino Jefferson		(substituted off) 55'
Substitutes
DF	17	(United States) Joey Gjertsen		(substituted on) 55'
MF	8	(Canada) Gabriel Gervais		(substituted on) 67'
FW	14	(Canada) Sita-Taty Matondo		(substituted on) 83'
Manager
(Canada) John Limniatis

Man of the Match
(Canada) Steve Kindel / (United States) David Testo
Assistant referees
Darren Clark
Martin Reid
Fourth official
Paul Ward

July 1
4:00 pm EDT

Toronto FC	0–1	Vancouver Whitecaps
	Report	Nash 37' (pen.)

BMO Field, Toronto, Ontario
Attendance: 18,938
Referee: Steve Depiero

Toronto FC	Vancouver Whitecaps

GK	1	(Canada) Greg Sutton
DF	4	(Puerto Rico) Marco Vélez
DF	11	(Canada) Jim Brennan (c)	(yellow card) 11'
DF	14	(Jamaica) Tyrone Marshall
DF	16	(United States) Marvell Wynne
MF	6	(United States) Maurice Edu
MF	10	(England) Rohan Ricketts		(substituted off) 46'
MF	33	(Wales) Carl Robinson
FW	9	(England) Danny Dichio		(substituted off) 46'
FW	20	(Honduras) Amado Guevara	(yellow card) 23'
FW	32	(France) Laurent Robert		(substituted off) 46'
Substitutes
FW	23	(New Zealand) Jarrod Smith		(substituted on) 46'
DF	3	(Trinidad and Tobago) Julius James		(substituted on) 46'
FW	96	(United States) Jeff Cunningham	(yellow card) 82'	(substituted on) 46'
Manager
(England) John Carver

GK	1	(United States) Jay Nolly
DF	8	(Canada) Jeff Clarke
DF	15	(Canada) Steve Kindel
DF	2	(Palestine) Omar Jarun
DF	24	(United States) Lyle Martin
MF	7	(Canada) Martin Nash	(yellow card) 7'
MF	9	(Canada) Alfredo Valente		(substituted off) 74'
MF	22	(Japan) Takashi Hirano		(substituted off) 66'
MF	25	(United States) Justin Moose	(yellow card) 45+'
FW	11	(Jamaica) Nicholas Addlery	(yellow card) 88'
FW	16	(Cuba) Eduardo Sebrango		(substituted off) 75'
Substitutes
DF	28	(Canada) Diaz Kambere		(substituted on) 66'
MF	23	(Bolivia) Vicente Arze		(substituted on) 74'
FW	32	(Canada) Charles Gbeke		(substituted on) 75'
Manager
(Iceland) Teitur Thordarson

Man of the Match
(Wales) Carl Robinson / (Canada) Martin Nash
Assistant referees
Amato DeLuca
Joe Fletcher
Fourth official
Silviu Petrescu

July 9
7:30 pm PDT

Vancouver Whitecaps	2–2	Toronto FC
Sebrango 43', 87'	Report	Edu 61'; Ricketts 75'

Swangard Stadium, Burnaby, British Columbia
Attendance: 5,228
Referee: Carol Anne Chénard

Vancouver Whitecaps	Toronto FC

GK	1	(United States) Jay Nolly
DF	2	(Canada) Jeff Clarke
DF	15	(Palestine) Omar Jarun
DF	22	(Japan) Takashi Hirano
DF	24	(United States) Lyle Martin
MF	7	(Canada) Martin Nash
MF	8	(Canada) Steve Kindel	(yellow card) 63'
MF	9	(Canada) Alfredo Valente		(substituted off) 75'
MF	25	(United States) Justin Moose		(substituted off) 72'
FW	11	(Jamaica) Nicholas Addlery		(substituted off) 72'
FW	16	(Cuba) Eduardo Sebrango
Substitutes
DF	28	(Canada) Diaz Kambere		(substituted on) 72'
FW	26	(Canada) Jason Jordan		(substituted on) 72'
MF	23	(Bolivia) Vicente Arze		(substituted on) 75'
Manager
(Iceland) Teitur Thordarson

GK	1	(Canada) Greg Sutton
DF	3	(Trinidad and Tobago) Julius James
DF	4	(Puerto Rico) Marco Vélez	(yellow card) 66'	(substituted off) 85'
DF	14	(Jamaica) Tyrone Marshall
DF	16	(United States) Marvell Wynne
MF	6	(United States) Maurice Edu
MF	10	(England) Rohan Ricketts
MF	32	(France) Laurent Robert		(substituted off) 80'
MF	33	(Wales) Carl Robinson
FW	20	(Honduras) Amado Guevara
FW	96	(United States) Jeff Cunningham
Substitutes
FW	14	(New Zealand) Jarrod Smith		(substituted on) 80'
MF	5	(Canada) Kevin Harmse		(substituted on) 85'
Manager
(England) John Carver

Man of the Match
(Cuba) Eduardo Sebrango / (England) Rohan Ricketts
Assistant referees
Darren Clark
Martin Reid
Fourth official
Paul Ward

July 22
7:00 pm EDT

Toronto FC	1–1	Montreal Impact
Ricketts 15'	Report	Brown 26'

BMO Field, Toronto, Ontario
Attendance: 20,107
Referee: Silviu Petrescu

Toronto FC	Montreal Impact

GK	1	(Canada) Greg Sutton
DF	4	(Puerto Rico) Marco Vélez	(substituted off) 86'
DF	11	(Canada) Jim Brennan (c)
DF	14	(Jamaica) Tyrone Marshall
DF	16	(United States) Marvell Wynne
MF	6	(United States) Maurice Edu
MF	10	(England) Rohan Ricketts
MF	20	(Honduras) Amado Guevara
MF	32	(France) Laurent Robert
MF	33	(Wales) Carl Robinson
FW	7	(United States) Abdus Ibrahim	(substituted off) 68'
Substitutes
FW	96	(United States) Jeff Cunningham	(substituted on) 68'
DF	3	(Trinidad and Tobago) Julius James	(substituted on) 86'
Manager
(England) John Carver

GK	1	(United States) Matt Jordan	(yellow card) 73'
DF	5	(Canada) Nevio Pizzolitto
DF	16	(Italy) Stefano Pesoli
DF	24	(Canada) Simon Gatti	(yellow card) 38'
DF	33	(Canada) Adam Braz	(yellow card) 53'	(substituted off) 73'
MF	7	(United States) David Testo
MF	9	(Canada) Rocco Placentino	(yellow card) 40'	(substituted off) 64'
MF	15	(Canada) Patrick Leduc
MF	17	(United States) Joey Gjertsen		(substituted off) 84'
MF	18	(Argentina) Leonardo Di Lorenzo
FW	10	(Panama) Roberto Brown	(yellow card) 90+2'
Substitutes
FW	14	(Canada) Sita-Taty Matondo		(substituted on) 64'
MF	26	(France) Cedric Joqueviel		(substituted on) 73'
MF	23	(Canada) Antonio Ribeiro		(substituted on) 84'
Manager
(Canada) John Limniatis

Man of the Match
(England) Rohan Ricketts / (Panama) Roberto Brown
Assistant referees
Joe Fletcher
Daniel Belleau
Fourth official
Steven DePiero

== Goalscorers ==
Rank	Player	Team	Goals
1	(Panama) Roberto Brown	Montreal Impact	2
1	(England) Rohan Ricketts	Toronto FC	2
1	(Cuba) Eduardo Sebrango	Vancouver Whitecaps	2
4	(United States) Maurice Edu	Toronto FC	1
4	(United States) Joey Gjertsen	Montreal Impact	1
4	(Brazil) Severino Jefferson	Montreal Impact	1
4	(Canada) Martin Nash	Vancouver Whitecaps	1
4	(United States) David Testo	Montreal Impact	1
4	(Puerto Rico) Marco Vélez	Toronto FC	1
