= Tyler Baldock =

Canadian soccer player

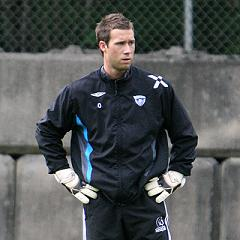
- Baldock in 2008

Personal information
- Date of birth: September 21, 1984 (age 42)
- Place of birth: Surrey, British Columbia, Canada
- Height: 1.83 m (6 ft 0 in)
- Position: Goalkeeper

College career
Years	Team	Apps	(Gls)
2003–2006	Carson–Newman Eagles	75	(0)

Senior career*
Years	Team	Apps	(Gls)
2005	West Virginia Chaos	6	(0)
2007	Vancouver Whitecaps	0	(0)
2008	Abbotsford Mariners	13	(0)
2008	Vancouver Whitecaps	0	(0)
Total		19	(0)

Managerial career
- 2008–?: Trinity Western University (goalkeepers)
- 2015–: Simon Fraser Athletics (goalkeepers)
- 2020: Canada U20 women (goalkeepers)
- * Club domestic league appearances and goals

Tyler Baldock (born September 21, 1984) is a Canadian former soccer player who played as a goalkeeper.

== College career ==
Baldock attended Carson–Newman University, where he played for the men's soccer team from 2003 to 2006. With the Eagles, he won four consecutive regular season SAC titles, a tournament title and a regional title. He was a three time All-American, All-Region and All-Conference award winner and earned back-to-back South Atlantic Conference Player of the Year honours in 2004 and 2005. He is the Carson-Newman and SAC record-holder for career shutouts with 36, and also holds the school records for career goals against average (0.75) and wins (51). He was set to be inducted into the school's hall of fame in 2021, however, he was unable to attend the ceremony and was later officially inducted in 2023.

== Club career ==
In 2005, he played for the West Virginia Chaos in the Premier Development League.

In May 2007, he signed with the Vancouver Whitecaps in the USL First Division.

In 2008, he played for the Abbotsford Mariners in the Premier Development League.

In 2008, he returned to the Whitecaps. After not appearing in a regular season match with the Whitecaps, he made his debut in the playoff semi-finals against the Montreal Impact after starting goalkeeper Jay Nolly was red-carded in the first leg. He kept a clean sheet in the second leg of the series, helping the Whitecaps to advance to the finals, where they defeated the Puerto Rico Islanders to win the league championship, but Baldock did not play in the final.

== Coaching career ==
In 2008, he became the goalkeepers coach for Trinity Western University.

He then worked with the Vancouver Whitecaps FC Academy.

Since 2015, he has been the goalkeeper coach for Simon Fraser University's men's soccer team. He also serves as goalkeeper coach for the youth club Surrey United SC.

In 2020, he was named goalkeepers coach for the Canadian women's U20 team ahead of the 2020 CONCACAF Women's U-20 Championship.

== Career statistics ==
Club	Season	League			Playoffs		Domestic cup		Total	
Club	Season	Division	Apps	Goals	Apps	Goals	Apps	Goals	Apps	Goals
West Virginia Chaos	2005	Premier Development League	6	0	–		–		6	0
Vancouver Whitecaps	2007	USL First Division	0	0	0	0	0	0	0	0
Abbotsford Mariners	2008	Premier Development League	13	0	–		–		13	0
Vancouver Whitecaps	2008	USL First Division	0	0	2	0	0	0	2	0
Career total			19	0	2	0	0	0	21	0
