= Alpha Secondary School =

Location
- 930 Alpha Avenue; Burnaby, British Columbia, V5C 3E2; Canada; 49.2762°N 122.9992°W

Information
- School type: Public, high school
- Motto: Where The Best Get Better
- Founded: 1950
- School board: School District 41 Burnaby
- School number: 4141005
- Principal: Mimi Lim
- Staff: 82
- Grades: 8-12
- Enrollment: 1086 (2022)
- Language: English, French
- Colours: Blue and gold
- Mascot: Eagles (previously Aztecs)
- Team name: Eagles
- Newspaper: Alpha Centauri
- Website: alpha.burnabyschools.ca

Alpha Secondary is a public high school in Burnaby, British Columbia, Canada. It is part of School District 41 Burnaby.

== Academics ==
Alpha Secondary offers a broad range of educational programming, including French Immersion, Mini School, Advanced Placement, Honours courses, and Ace-It programs. Students wishing to earn their professional certification as a hairstylist can enroll in the two year District Hairdressing Program. Alpha also has an integrated honours program for Grade 8 students called Discovery. In 2008, Alpha students earned over $410,000 in scholarships.

== Clubs and councils ==
Students at Alpha are provided with a variety of leadership opportunities through their participation in over 30 clubs and councils. The main leadership groups are Student Council, Music Council, Visual Arts Council, Grad Council, and The Offence. Other groups go beyond the school and organize events that improve both the local and global community, such as Frontlines, Enviro and Mycology Club. Alpha also has a debate team, and the Photojournalism Club runs the school newspaper, Alpha Centauri. Through these groups, students organize school based events that contribute to the school culture.

== Arts ==
While Alpha Secondary is considered a highly academic school, it is also recognized for its visual and performing arts programs which include choral and instrumental music, drama, theatre, dance, visual arts, and media arts.

=== Music ===
Alpha's music program includes concert choir, concert band, jazz band, small ensembles, and string ensemble.

=== Theatre ===
Alpha's Theatre Program explores different roles and techniques used in theatrical experiences. It is a full-year course, running from September to June. During this time, there are three events: a Halloween experience, the Winter Cabaret, and a Spring show. The Winter Cabaret consists of improv, lip-dubs, dances, and singing. It has a strong theme for consistency among the performances. Tech roles during the Winter Cabaret consist of Stage Manager, Assistant Stage Manager, FOH, and Sound Booth. The Spring Show is a scripted performance of a play.

== Athletics ==
- 2002 Provincial AAA Boys Soccer – placed 2nd
- 2003 Provincial AAA Boys Soccer Champions
- 2005 Provincial AAA Volleyball – placed 3rd
- 2006 Provincial AAA Volleyball Champions
- 2007 Provincial AAA Volleyball – placed 2nd
- 2013 Provincial AAA Rugby – placed 2nd
- 2013 BNWSSAA Junior Girls Soccer Champions
- 2015 BNWSSAA Senior Boys Soccer Champions
- 2017 BNWSSAA Junior Boys Soccer Champions
- 2017 VNDS Junior Boys Soccer Champions
- 2017/18 Provincial Gymnastics Champion
- 2018/19 BNWSSAA Junior Boys Soccer Champions
- 2018/19 VNDS Junior Boys Soccer Champion

== Notable alumni ==
- Mike James, retired professional rugby player, former Team Canada captain
- Ashley Leitão, former top ten contestant on Canadian Idol, attended Alpha and graduated in 2004
- Devon Sawa, actor (Final Destination, Casper), class of 1998
- Don Taylor, currently working for Sportsnet, and the TEAM 1040, class of 1977
- Alfredo Valente, Olympic soccer player and soccer player for the Vancouver Whitecaps FC, class of 1998
