= Mason Webb =

American soccer player

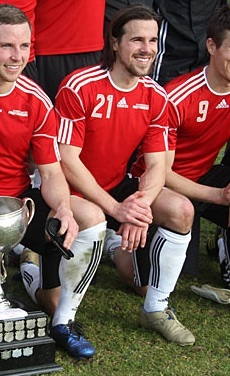

Personal information
- Full name: Mason Rhys Webb
- Date of birth: May 6, 1986 (age 40)
- Place of birth: Bellingham, Washington, U.S.
- Height: 5 ft 9 in (1.75 m)
- Positions: Midfielder; defender

Team information
- Current team: Surrey United Firefighters
- Number: 21

Youth career
- 2004: Whatcom FC Rangers
- 2004: Snohomish United
- 2005–2007: Oregon State University

Senior career*
Years	Team	Apps	(Gls)
2008	Vancouver Whitecaps	4	(0)
2008	→ Whitecaps Residency (loan)	5	(1)
2010–present	Surrey United Firefighters	255	(20)
- * Club domestic league appearances and goals as of 3 June 2008

Mason Webb (born May 6, 1986) is an American former professional soccer player. He currently plays for Surrey United Firefighters. Upon playing midfield in his youth career, Mason has moved to an outside fullback position where he has been regarded as one of the top defenders in the VMSL. Earning the top point scorer as a defender, netting two goals, and getting nine assists for a total of 13 points, during the 2011 season VMSL season. His accuracy in passing and crossing, his speed going forward and closing down attackers, and his control on and off the ball have led to him to the nickname "the Jag," short for the Jaguar.

== Career ==
He played one year with Snohomish United and served as the team captain in four of his five years with WFC Rangers. As a midfielder, Mason also played four years on the Washington state and US Region IV Olympic Development Program (ODP) teams. In 2004, Mason received a full scholarship to Oregon State University alongside current soccer players, Ryan Johnson (Portland Timbers and Jamaica national football team), Robbie Findley (Real Salt Lake and United States men's national soccer team), Bryan Jordan (San Antonio Scorpions and United States men's national under-23 soccer team), Daniel Leach (Barnet, Dover Athletic, U-17 Australian National Team). He has played alongside twin brother, and former American professional soccer player, Nick Webb for most of his career.

Mason played for the USL-1 League Champions Vancouver Whitecaps in 2008. He took one year off of soccer to finish his undergraduate study at Oregon State while he still had a scholarship, earning his Bachelor of Science in psychology. Upon graduation, Mason moved back to Bellingham WA, and has played for 2-time VMSL League and Imperial Cup Champions, the Surrey United Firefighters

== Personal life ==
He is the twin brother of Nick Webb.
