= Canadian Championship =

Annual professional soccer tournament

Canadian Championship Championnat canadien
- Founded: 2008; 18 years ago
- Region: Canada (CONCACAF)
- Teams: 15
- Current champions: Forge FC (1st title)
- Most championships: Toronto FC (8 titles)
- Broadcaster(s): Men; OneSoccer; TSN; Women; CBC Sports
- Website: canadasoccer.com
- 2026 Canadian Championship (men); 2026–27 W Canadian Championship (women)

The Canadian Championship (French: Championnat canadien) is an annual soccer tournament contested by Canadian professional and semi-pro men's teams. The winner is awarded the Voyageurs Cup and a berth in the CONCACAF Champions Cup. It is contested by eight Canadian Premier League sides, three Major League Soccer sides, and the four champions of the Alberta Premier League, British Columbia Premier League, Ontario Premier League, and Ligue1 Québec.

The tournament is organized by the Canadian Soccer Association and has been broadcast on OneSoccer since 2019 with some matches simulcast on TSN. In 2026, the W Canadian Championship was introduced for women's teams.

== History ==
=== Background ===
The Canadian Championship is a domestic cup competition organized by the Canadian Soccer Association. The championship determines one of Canada's entries in the annual CONCACAF Champions Cup. Until the creation of the Canadian Premier League in 2019, all fully professional Canadian soccer teams played in United States–based leagues. Prior to the creation of the official competition in 2008, there was no domestic competition to determine the best Canadian professional team (as Canada Soccer's Challenge Trophy only crowned the best amateur team). Though a notable attempt was conducted by the Canadian Soccer League through the Open Canada Cup, which ultimately managed to attract professional and amateur clubs from British Columbia, Ontario, and Quebec. The tournament was dissolved in 2008 after the creation of the Canadian Championship.

An unofficial Canadian Champion determined in the same manner as 2008–2010, a home-and-away series with the games taken from USL First Division (USL-1) regular season league games, was awarded by the Canadian national teams' supporters group, The Voyageurs. This unofficial Canadian Championship became less legitimate when Toronto was awarded a Major League Soccer (MLS) franchise to start play in 2007 in the USSF Division 1 MLS league above the USSF Division 2 USL-1 league. Toronto's USL-1 team self relegated, while the other two Canadian professional soccer teams did not play meaningful games against the new MLS team in 2007.

=== Early years ===
For the 2008–09 season, CONCACAF changed their eight team FIFA Club World Cup qualification tournament from a two-legged aggregate goals knockout elimination format, named the CONCACAF Champions Cup, to a format mirroring the UEFA Champions League with a play-in round, a group stage, and lastly a two-leg aggregate score knockout format for the final rounds. The format change for the 2008–09 CONCACAF Champions League provided the opportunity to expand the number of qualifying teams from different countries, and Canada was awarded a single entry in the play-in round preceding the group stage. The year 2008 was the first time a Canadian entry had been awarded by CONCACAF since 1992, and the first time a Canadian team participated since 1976. To award the new Canadian entry, the CSA created a new competition consisting of a home-and-away round-robin series between the three fully professional Canadian teams: Montreal Impact, Toronto FC and the Vancouver Whitecaps. The 2008 Canadian Championship was contested between May and July 2008 and won by the Montreal Impact. As the Canadian champions, Montreal qualified for the 2008–09 CONCACAF Champions League.

The 2009 Canadian Championship's format and participants were the same, contested by the three clubs in May and June 2009. It was closely contended by Toronto and Vancouver and won by the former via goal differential in the tournament's final game against the defending champions, Montreal, giving the Toronto franchise its first ever trophy and a spot in the qualifying round of the 2009–10 CONCACAF Champions League. Toronto repeated as champions in the 2010 competition, qualifying for the 2010–11 CONCACAF Champions League.

In 2011, with the start of a fourth fully professional Canadian soccer team, FC Edmonton, the competition was changed from the home-and-away round robin series to a double-leg aggregate score knockout cup format with the two MLS teams seeded first and second, and NASL teams seeded third and fourth based on league standings of the previous year and the USSF tiering of Division 1 and Division 2. This format mitigated competitive concerns regarding already eliminated teams and the number of additional (extra to their regular league) games each team would be required to play during a season.

Toronto FC won the first two knockout tournaments, making a total of four wins in a row between 2009 and 2012. At the 2015 Canadian Championship, Vancouver Whitecaps FC won their first Voyageurs Cup becoming the last of three Canadian MLS teams to win it.

=== Tournament expansion ===
On June 6, 2016, Canadian Soccer Association general secretary Peter Montopoli told TSN that plans were well under way to expand the tournament to include an access point for any team in Canada. He said that he expected the expansion to take place for 2017. His statement seemed to confirm other reports saying similar. On March 9, 2017, Canada Soccer Association announced that from the 2018 edition the winners of the semi-pro League1 Ontario and Première ligue de soccer du Québec would compete.

In January 2019, a new five-round format was announced to include the seven teams of the newly formed Canadian Premier League, bringing the total number of teams competing to 13. In 2020, with the dissolution of Ottawa Fury FC, a modified four-round tournament was announced featuring 12 teams, the first contraction in the competition's history. Due to the COVID-19 pandemic, the 2020 edition was instead held between two teams qualified through league play, with the top Canadian MLS team meeting the CPL winners. Due to various scheduling conflicts between Forge FC and Toronto FC, the final match was not played until June 2022.

Beginning in 2023, the league winner of League1 British Columbia joined the tournament as a competitor. The league was first represented by TSS Rovers who became the first semi-pro team to advance in the tournament against a professional team. They defeated Canadian Premier League side Valour FC 3–1 to reach the quarter-finals. In 2025, the league winner of League1 Alberta became the fourth semi-pro entrant, joining the three existing League1 Canada champions. A fifth semi-pro league, the Prairies Premier League, was founded in 2026 but its inaugural champion was not invited to the 2027 Canadian Championship.

== Trophy ==
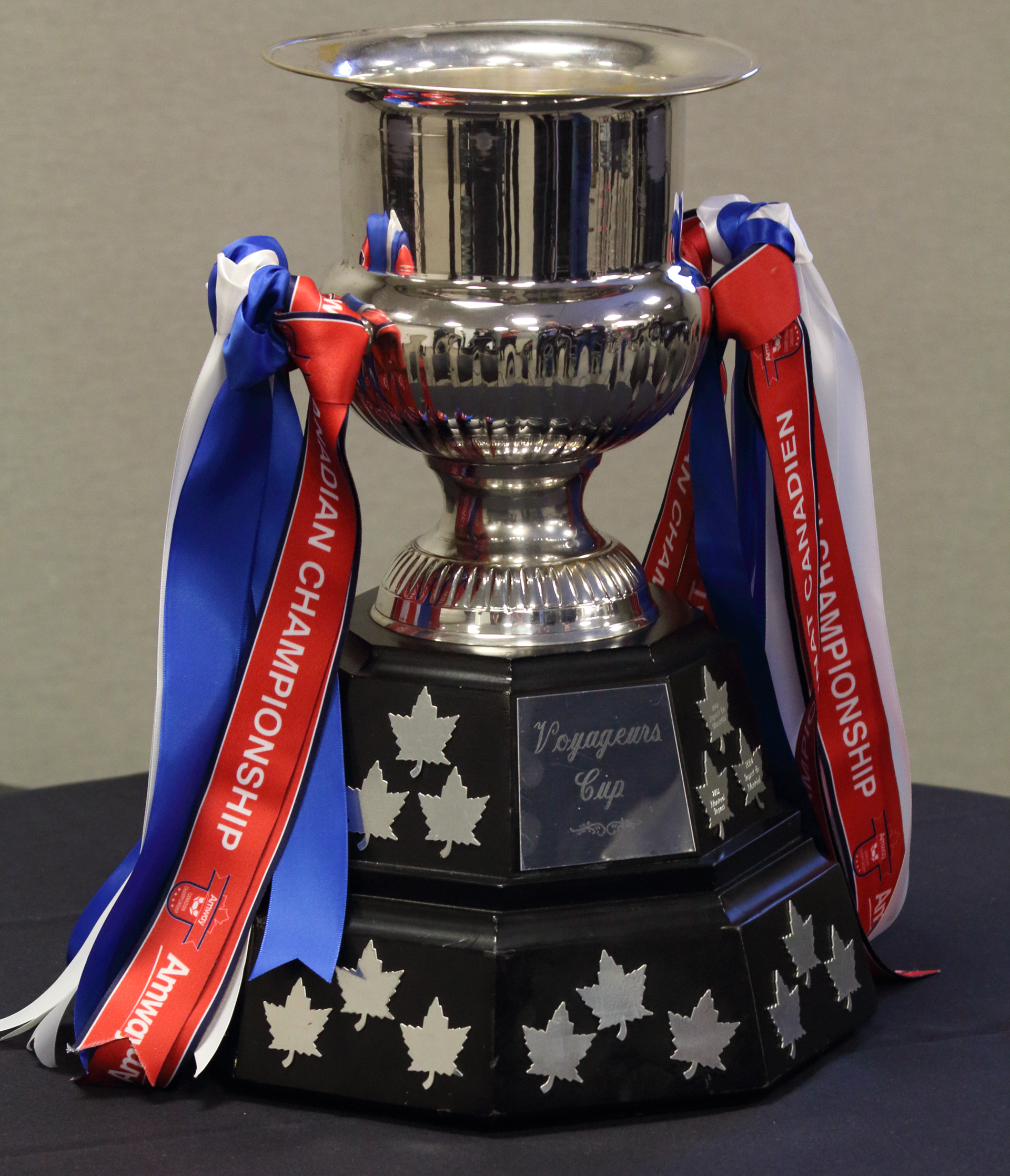
The champions are awarded the Voyageurs Cup

The winners of the Canadian Championship are awarded the Voyageurs Cup. From 1993 to 2007, there was no domestic competition open to top-tier Canadian professional clubs. From 2002 to 2006, the American USL First Division was the highest level in which Canadian men's soccer teams competed. The Voyageurs, a supporters' group, developed a method of tracking league results between Canadian clubs to determine a professional Canadian champion.

With the introduction of the Canadian Championship as a separate competition, the Voyageurs donated the cup to the Canadian Soccer Association to award to the winners. The trophy is still awarded by a Voyageurs member to the current winning club.

== Format ==
From 2008 to 2010, the tournament consisted of the three professional teams in Canada in a home-and-away series with the top team winning entry into the qualifying stage of the CONCACAF Champions League. These teams competed in the two top US-based professional soccer leagues, which in 2010 was Major League Soccer and the temporary USSF Division 2 Professional League. In 2011, the North American Soccer League received sanctioning as the USSF's new second-division league.

When FC Edmonton joined the NASL in 2011, the tournament was expanded to include all four professional clubs in the country. The tournament consisted of two-legged semi-finals and a two-legged final. In the first semi-final of 2011, Toronto, as reigning champions, was assigned the first-place seed and played Edmonton, which was assigned the fourth seed as newcomers to the tournament. The two remaining teams, Montreal and Vancouver, faced off in the other semi-final. This was to be followed by a one-game final to be hosted by the highest remaining seed; but the Canadian Soccer Association decided to go with a two-legged final instead. The format was repeated in subsequent years with the previous year's league placement being used to seed the teams.

Starting with the 2014 competition, due to the introduction of the Ottawa Fury FC to the NASL, the two Canadian NASL teams played in a play-off quarter-final to determine which team made it to the semi-finals, in which the MLS teams were introduced.

Due to scheduling conflicts with the 2015 FIFA Women's World Cup, the 2015 edition was held during April, May, and August but did not provide a competitor for the 2015–16 CONCACAF Champions League; instead the best-placed Canadian Major League Soccer team in the 2014 regular season was the country's representative. The Whitecaps qualified for the championship on October 19, 2014. The winner of the 2015 Canadian Championship qualified for the 2016–17 CONCACAF Champions League instead and starting in 2016, the competition would be held in June and July.

Since 2017, competition regulations state that each team must field a minimum of three Canadian starters for each match.

In 2018, following the suspension of operations at FC Edmonton, the format of the Championship was amended once more to allow for the admission of two clubs from the Division 3 provincial leagues: League1 Ontario and Première ligue de soccer du Québec. The two provincial champions meet in a first qualifying round, with the winner progressing to meet the sole Canadian USL team (not including Toronto FC II, which is a department of the MLS side Toronto FC), Ottawa Fury FC in a second qualifying round. The winner of this match joins the three Canadian MLS teams in the semi-finals. AS Blainville and Oakville Blue Devils qualified to represent the Quebec and Ontario leagues respectively in 2018.

The 2019 Canadian Championship was the first to feature teams from the newly created Canadian Premier League. With 13 teams competing, the competition was expanded to include three qualifying rounds along with the semi-finals and final. The first qualifying round began with six teams, with three new teams entering each round until the semi-finals where the previous year's champion entered. All rounds were two-legged match ups.

In 2021, a format was introduced with four rounds consisting of single leg ties. First round matchups have been determined geographically (i.e. east and west) and byes have been awarded to the previous year's tournament finalists. In 2024, the format was altered slightly to feature two-legged matchups for the quarter-final and semi-final rounds. Starting that year, hosting privileges up to the semi-finals became based on performances in the past three editions of the tournament. In 2026, the top-four seeded teams were pre-assigned to positions in the bracket such that they could not face each other until the semi-finals.

== Participants ==
Permanent Canadian Championship clubs

Team	City	League	Years
Atlético Ottawa	Ottawa, Ontario	Canadian Premier League	2021–present
Cavalry FC	Calgary, Alberta	Canadian Premier League	2019; 2021–present
Forge FC	Hamilton, Ontario	Canadian Premier League	2019–present
HFX Wanderers FC	Halifax, Nova Scotia	Canadian Premier League	2019; 2021–present
Inter Toronto FC	Toronto, Ontario	Canadian Premier League	2019; 2021–present
CF Montréal	Montreal, Quebec	Major League Soccer	2012–2019; 2021–present
Pacific FC	Langford, British Columbia	Canadian Premier League	2019; 2021–present
FC Supra du Québec	Laval, Quebec	Canadian Premier League	2026–present
Toronto FC	Toronto, Ontario	Major League Soccer	2008–present
Vancouver FC	Langley, British Columbia	Canadian Premier League	2023–present
Vancouver Whitecaps FC	Vancouver, British Columbia	Major League Soccer	2011–2019; 2021–present

2026 PSL Canada qualifiers for the Canadian Championship

Team	City	League	Years
Calgary Blizzard SC	Calgary, Alberta	Alberta Premier League	2026
Langley United	Langley, British Columbia	British Columbia Premier League	2026
Woodbridge Strikers	Vaughan, Ontario	Ontario Premier League	2026
CS Saint-Laurent	Montreal, Quebec	Ligue1 Québec	2024, 2026

Clubs that have previously participated

† – Defunct club
‡ – Defunct club replaced by phoenix club

Team	City	League	Years
AS Blainville	Blainville, Quebec	Ligue1 Québec	2018, 2019, 2021
FC Edmonton †	Edmonton, Alberta	North American Soccer League, Canadian Premier League	2011–2017, 2019, 2021–2022
Edmonton Scottish	Edmonton, Alberta	League1 Alberta	2025
Guelph United FC	Guelph, Ontario	League1 Ontario	2022
FC Laval	Laval, Quebec	Ligue1 Québec	2023, 2025
Master's FA	Toronto, Ontario	League1 Ontario	2021
CS Mont-Royal Outremont	Mount Royal, Quebec	Ligue1 Québec	2022
Montreal Impact ‡	Montreal, Quebec	USL First Division, USSF Division 2, North American Soccer League	2008–2011
Oakville Blue Devils	Oakville, Ontario	League1 Ontario	2018
Ottawa Fury FC †	Ottawa, Ontario	North American Soccer League, USL Championship	2014–2019
Scrosoppi FC	Milton, Ontario	League1 Ontario	2025
Simcoe County Rovers FC	Barrie, Ontario	League1 Ontario	2024
TSS FC Rovers	Burnaby, British Columbia	League1 British Columbia	2023–2025
Valour FC †	Winnipeg, Manitoba	Canadian Premier League	2019; 2021–2025
Vancouver Whitecaps ‡	Vancouver, British Columbia	USL First Division, USSF Division 2	2008–2010
Vaughan Azzurri	Vaughan, Ontario	League1 Ontario	2019, 2023

== Results ==
=== By year ===
Year	Winners	Runners-up	Teams	Format
2008	Montreal Impact	Toronto FC	3	Home and away round robin
2009	Toronto FC	Vancouver Whitecaps	3	Home and away round robin
2010	Toronto FC (2)	Vancouver Whitecaps	3	Home and away round robin
2011	Toronto FC (3)	Vancouver Whitecaps FC	4	Two-legged knock-out
2012	Toronto FC (4)	Vancouver Whitecaps FC	4	Two-legged knock-out
2013	Montreal Impact (2)	Vancouver Whitecaps FC	4	Two-legged knock-out
2014	Montreal Impact (3)	Toronto FC	5	Two-legged knock-out
2015	Vancouver Whitecaps FC	Montreal Impact	5	Two-legged knock-out
2016	Toronto FC (5)	Vancouver Whitecaps FC	5	Two-legged knock-out
2017	Toronto FC (6)	Montreal Impact	5	Two-legged knock-out
2018	Toronto FC (7)	Vancouver Whitecaps FC	6	Two-legged knock-out
2019	Montreal Impact (4)	Toronto FC	13	Two-legged knock-out
2020	Toronto FC (8)	Forge FC	2 (Note: Originally scheduled as a 12-team, two-legged knockout tournament, the 2020 edition was reduced in scope and delayed until 2022 due to the COVID-19 pandemic.)	Single match
2021	CF Montréal (5)	Toronto FC	13	Single-leg knock-out
2022	Vancouver Whitecaps FC (2)	Toronto FC	13	Single-leg knock-out
2023	Vancouver Whitecaps FC (3)	CF Montréal	14	Single-leg knock-out
2024	Vancouver Whitecaps FC (4)	Toronto FC	14	Mixed knock-out (Note: Single-leg for the preliminary round and final; two legs for the quarter-final and semi-final rounds.)
2025	Vancouver Whitecaps FC (5)	Vancouver FC	15	Mixed knock-out
2026	Forge FC	CF Montréal	15	Mixed knock-out

=== By club ===
Rank	Club	Winner	Runner-up	Seasons won
1	Toronto FC	8	6	2009, 2010, 2011, 2012, 2016, 2017, 2018, 2020
2	Vancouver Whitecaps FC	5	7	2015, 2022, 2023, 2024, 2025
3	CF Montréal	5	4	2008, 2013, 2014, 2019, 2021
4	Forge FC	1	1	2026
5	Vancouver FC	0	1	

=== All-time table ===
As of October 21, 2026

Rank	Team	Pld	W	D	L	GF	GA	GD	Pts
1	Toronto FC	60	32	15	13	102	52	+50	111
2	Vancouver Whitecaps FC	64	28	21	15	96	69	+27	105
3	CF Montréal	62	22	18	22	79	75	+4	84
4	Forge FC	26	11	10	5	37	29	+8	43
5	Cavalry FC	22	10	7	5	32	21	+11	37
6	Ottawa Fury FC	20	8	2	10	21	34	−13	26
7	Atlético Ottawa	15	7	4	4	32	23	+10	25
8	FC Edmonton	22	6	2	14	25	39	−14	20
9	Inter Toronto FC	18	5	4	9	27	28	−1	19
10	HFX Wanderers FC	14	5	2	7	21	27	−6	17
11	Pacific FC	16	4	5	7	17	23	−6	17
12	Vancouver FC	11	2	3	6	12	15	−3	9
13	FC Supra du Québec	5	2	2	1	10	7	+3	8
14	AS Blainville	7	2	1	4	4	6	−2	7
15	Valour FC	10	2	1	7	10	24	−14	7
16	CS Saint-Laurent	6	1	2	3	6	16	−10	5
17	TSS FC Rovers	4	1	1	2	4	5	−1	4
18	Vaughan Azzurri	3	1	0	2	3	5	−2	3
19	11 teams tied								0

- Statistics for Vancouver Whitecaps FC include the original Vancouver Whitecaps who took part in the tournament in the first three editions from 2008 through 2010. This team ceased operations in 2011 and was replaced by a new MLS franchise of the same name and ownership.
- In 2012, the Montreal Impact of MLS replaced the former Montreal Impact of the NASL in the Canadian Championship. Statistics include data from both iterations of the Impact. They re-branded as CF Montréal in 2021.

== Awards ==
=== George Gross Memorial Trophy ===
The George Gross Memorial Trophy was created by the Canadian Soccer Association in 2008 to recognize each tournament's most valuable player. The Trophy was named after the late George Gross, a former soccer administrator and a respected journalist.

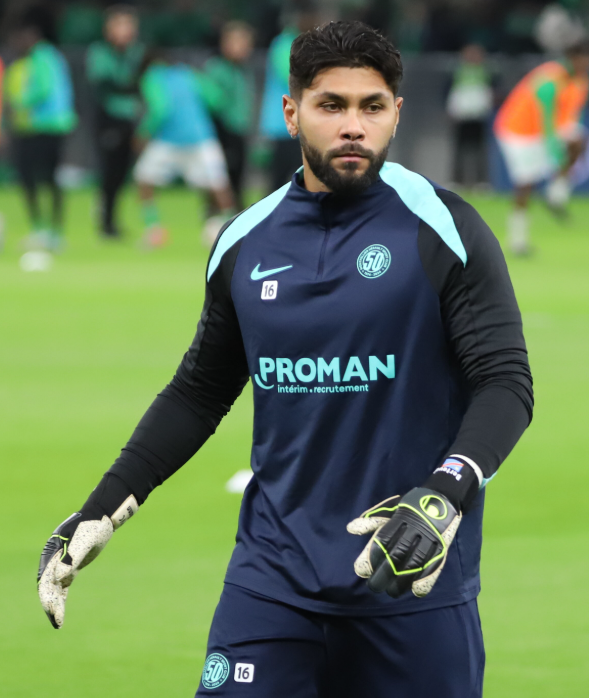
Dimitry Bertaud is the most recent recipient of the George Gross Memorial Trophy.

Year	Player	Position	Nationality	Team
2008	Matt Jordan	Goalkeeper	United States	Montreal Impact
2009	Dwayne De Rosario	Midfielder	Canada	Toronto FC
2010	Dwayne De Rosario	Midfielder	Canada	Toronto FC
2011	Joao Plata	Forward	Ecuador	Toronto FC
2012	Ryan Johnson	Forward	Jamaica	Toronto FC
2013	Justin Mapp	Midfielder	United States	Montreal Impact
2014	Justin Mapp	Midfielder	United States	Montreal Impact
2015	Russell Teibert	Midfielder	Canada	Vancouver Whitecaps FC
2016	Benoît Cheyrou	Midfielder	France	Toronto FC
2017	Sebastian Giovinco	Forward	Italy	Toronto FC
2018	Jonathan Osorio	Midfielder	Canada	Toronto FC
2019	Ignacio Piatti	Forward	Argentina	Montreal Impact
2020	Not awarded (Note: Although the trophy wasn't awarded at the conclusion of the 2020 Canadian Championship, Canada Soccer named Forge FC's Tristan Borges the performer of the match of the final, the only match played in that year's tournament.)			
2021	Sebastian Breza	Goalkeeper	Canada	CF Montréal
2022	Ryan Gauld	Midfielder	Scotland	Vancouver Whitecaps FC
2023	Julian Gressel	Defender	United States	Vancouver Whitecaps FC
2024	Isaac Boehmer	Goalkeeper	Canada	Vancouver Whitecaps FC
2025	Ali Ahmed	Midfielder	Canada	Vancouver Whitecaps FC
2026	Dimitry Bertaud	Goalkeeper	DR Congo	Forge FC

=== Best Young Canadian Player award ===
The Best Young Canadian Player award was created by the Canadian Soccer Association in 2019 to recognize each tournament's best Canadian under-23 player.

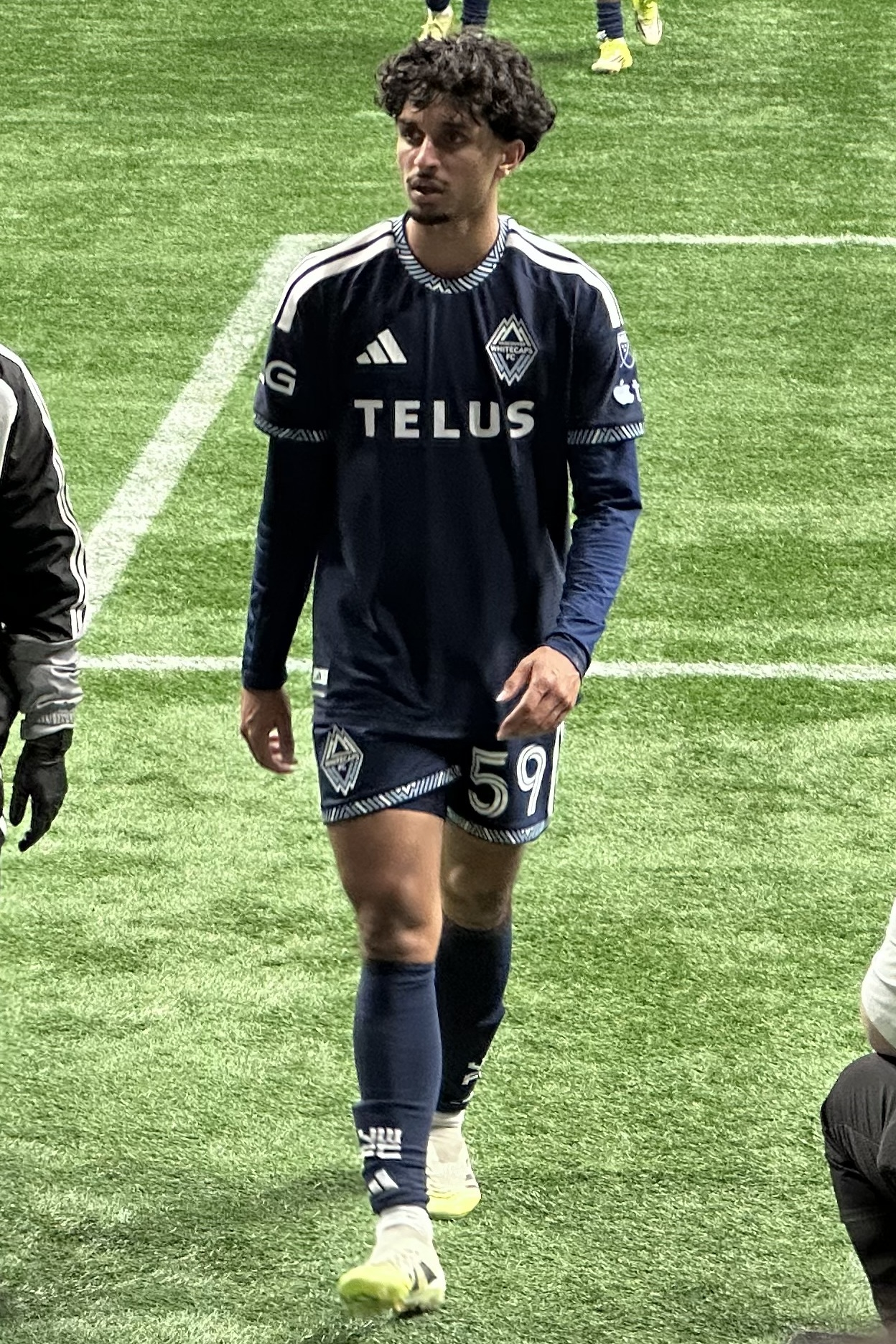
Jeevan Badwal is the latest winner of the Best Young Canadian Player Award.

Year	Player	Position	Team
2019	Zachary Brault-Guillard	Defender	Montreal Impact
2020	Not awarded		
2021	Jacob Shaffelburg	Forward	Toronto FC
2022	Ryan Raposo	Forward	Vancouver Whitecaps FC
2023	Ali Ahmed	Defender	Vancouver Whitecaps FC
2024	Isaac Boehmer	Goalkeeper	Vancouver Whitecaps FC
2025	Jayden Nelson	Forward	Vancouver Whitecaps FC
2026	Jeevan Badwal	Midfielder	Vancouver Whitecaps FC

=== Top Scorer of the Canadian Championship ===
The Top Scorer of the Canadian Championship is the player who scores the most goals during the competition. In case two or more players are tied, the first tiebreaker is most assists and the second tiebreaker is fewest minutes played.

Year	Player	Nationality	Team	Total
2008	Roberto Brown	Panama	Montreal Impact	2 goals (0 assists, 157 minutes)
2009	Dwayne De Rosario	Canada	Toronto FC	3 goals
2010	Dwayne De Rosario	Canada	Toronto FC	1 goal (1 assist)
2011	Maicon Santos	Brazil	Toronto FC	3 goals
2012	Sebastien Le Toux	France	Vancouver Whitecaps FC	2 goals (0 assists, 168 minutes)
2013	Camilo Sanvezzo	Brazil	Vancouver Whitecaps FC	3 goals
2014	Jack McInerney	United States	Montreal Impact	3 goals
2015	Tomi Ameobi	England	FC Edmonton	4 goals
2016	Jordan Hamilton	Canada	Toronto FC	2 goals (1 assist)
2017	Sebastian Giovinco	Italy	Toronto FC	3 goals
2018	Jonathan Osorio	Canada	Toronto FC	3 goals (1 assist)
2019	Ignacio Piatti	Argentina	Montreal Impact	4 goals
2020	Tristan Borges	Canada	Forge FC	1 goal (0 assists, 67 minutes)
2021	Austin Ricci	Canada	Valour FC	3 goals
2022	Sunusi Ibrahim	Nigeria	CF Montréal	3 goals (0 assists, 62 minutes)
2023	Sunusi Ibrahim	Nigeria	CF Montréal	3 goals
2024	Deandre Kerr	Canada	Toronto FC	5 goals
2025	Samuel Salter	Canada	Atlético Ottawa	4 goals (1 assist)
2026	Ballou Tabla	Canada	Atlético Ottawa	4 goals

== Player records ==
=== Appearances ===
As of October 21, 2026

Rank	Player	Club(s)	Nationality	Appearances
1	**Jonathan Osorio**	Toronto FC	Canada	34
2	Russell Teibert	Vancouver Whitecaps FC	Canada	32
3	Kyle Bekker	Toronto FC, Montreal Impact, Forge FC	Canada	31
4	**David Choinière**	Montreal Impact, Forge FC, FC Supra du Québec	Canada	25
5	**Tristan Borges**	Forge FC	Canada	24
5	Ashtone Morgan	Toronto FC, Forge FC	Canada	24
7	**Manny Aparicio**	York9, Pacific FC, Atlético Ottawa	Canada	23
7	**Callum Irving**	Ottawa Fury, Pacific FC, Vancouver FC	Canada	23
9	Alexander Achinioti-Jönsson	Forge FC	Sweden	20
9	**Nicolás Mezquida**	Vancouver Whitecaps FC, Vancouver FC	Uruguay	20
9	Justin Morrow	Toronto FC	United States	20

=== Top goalscorers ===
As of September 16, 2026

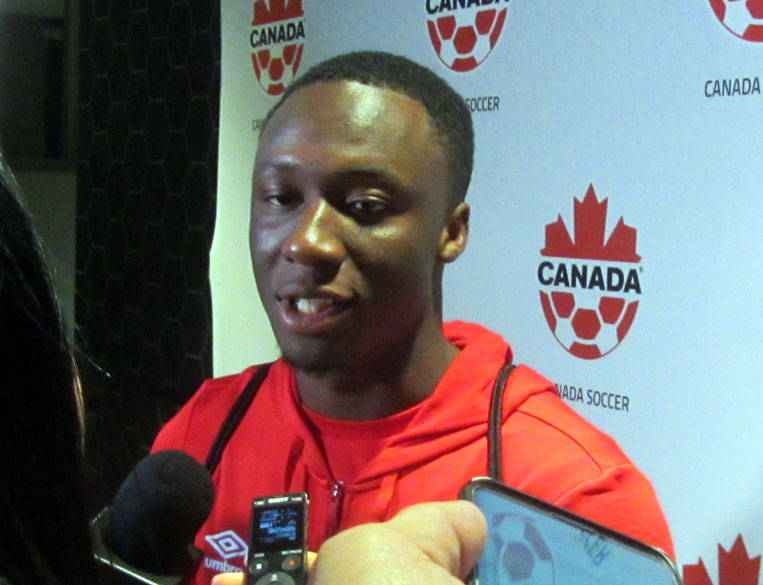
Ballou Tabla is the all-time top scorer in the tournament with nine goals.

Rank	Player	Club(s) (goals)	Nationality	Goals
1	**Ballou Tabla**	CF Montréal (3), Atlético Ottawa (6)	Canada	9
2	**Nicolás Mezquida**	Vancouver Whitecaps FC (3), Vancouver FC (5)	Uruguay	8
2	**Jonathan Osorio**	Toronto FC	Canada	8
2	**Prince Owusu**	Toronto FC (3), CF Montréal (5)	Ghana	8
5	**Ryan Gauld**	Vancouver Whitecaps FC	Scotland	7
6	Jozy Altidore	Toronto FC	United States	6
6	**David Choinière**	Montreal Impact (1), Forge FC (3), FC Supra du Québec (2)	Canada	6
6	Sebastian Giovinco	Toronto FC	Italy	6
6	Sunusi Ibrahim	CF Montréal	Nigeria	6
6	Deandre Kerr	Toronto FC	Canada	6
6	Ignacio Piatti	Montreal Impact	Argentina	6
6	Samuel Salter	HFX Wanderers FC (1), Atlético Ottawa (5)	Canada	6
6	**Brian White**	Vancouver Whitecaps FC	United States	6

Bolded players are still active players with a Canadian team.

=== Top goalscorers by season ===
Season	Player(s)	Club(s)	Nationality	Goals
2008	Roberto Brown	Montreal Impact	Panama	2
2008	Rohan Ricketts	Toronto FC	England	2
2008	Eduardo Sebrango	Vancouver Whitecaps	Cuba	2
2009	Dwayne De Rosario	Toronto FC	Canada	3
2010	Chad Barrett	Toronto FC	United States	1
2010	Philippe Billy	Montreal Impact	France	1
2010	Peter Byers	Montreal Impact	Antigua and Barbuda	1
2010	Dwayne De Rosario	Toronto FC	Canada	1
2010	Marcus Haber	Vancouver Whitecaps	Canada	1
2010	Ty Harden	Toronto FC	United States	1
2010	Ansu Toure	Vancouver Whitecaps	Liberia	1
2011	Maicon Santos	Toronto FC	Brazil	3
2012	Eric Hassli	Vancouver Whitecaps FC	France	2
2012	Ryan Johnson	Toronto FC	Jamaica	2
2012	Reggie Lambe	Toronto FC	Bermuda	2
2012	Sébastien Le Toux	Vancouver Whitecaps FC	France	2
2013	Camilo	Vancouver Whitecaps FC	Brazil	3
2014	Jack McInerney	Montreal Impact	United States	3
2015	Tomi Ameobi	FC Edmonton	England	4
2016	Jonathan Osorio	Toronto FC	Canada	2
2016	Jordan Hamilton	Toronto FC	Canada	2
2016	Nicolás Mezquida	Vancouver Whitecaps FC	Uruguay	2
2017	Sebastian Giovinco	Toronto FC	Italy	3
2018	Jonathan Osorio	Toronto FC	Canada	3
2018	Jozy Altidore	Toronto FC	United States	3
2018	Kei Kamara	Vancouver Whitecaps FC	Sierra Leone	3
2019	Ignacio Piatti	Montreal Impact	Argentina	4
2020	Tristan Borges	Forge FC	Canada	1
2020	Alejandro Pozuelo	Toronto FC	Spain	1
2021	Austin Ricci	Valour FC	Canada	3
2022	Myer Bevan	Cavalry FC	New Zealand	3
2022	Sunusi Ibrahim	CF Montréal	Nigeria	3
2022	Brian White	Vancouver Whitecaps FC	United States	3
2023	Sunusi Ibrahim	CF Montréal	Nigeria	3
2024	Deandre Kerr	Toronto FC	Canada	5
2025	Julian Altobelli	York United FC	Canada	4
2025	Samuel Salter	Atlético Ottawa	Canada	4
2026	Ballou Tabla	Atlético Ottawa	Canada	4

== See also ==
- Canada Soccer's National Championships
- Canadian soccer clubs in international competitions
- Open Canada Cup
- Canada Cup (soccer)
- W Canadian Championship
