= Roberto Brown =

Panamanian footballer (born 1977)

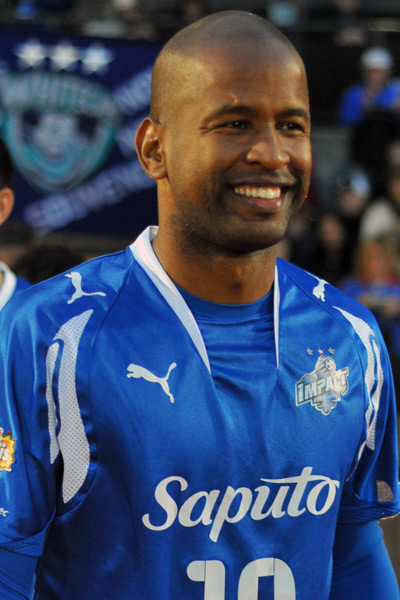

Personal information
- Full name: Roberto Ronaldo Brown Perea
- Date of birth: July 15, 1977 (age 49)
- Place of birth: Panama City, Panama
- Height: 6 ft 1 in (1.85 m)
- Position: Forward

Senior career*
Years	Team	Apps	(Gls)
1996	Ejecutivo Junior		
1996–1997	Cartaginés		
1998–1999	Real España		
1999	FAS		
2000	Alianza		
2001	Sporting '89		
2001	San Francisco		
2002–2004	Sheriff Tiraspol	15	(4)
2004–2005	Austria Salzburg	9	(1)
2005–2006	Peñarol	16	(1)
2006–2007	Tacuarembó	9	(2)
2007	Colorado Rapids	13	(3)
2007–2010	Montreal Impact	59	(13)
2010–2012	San Francisco		
2012–2013	Millenium UP		
2013	San Francisco		

International career
2000–2011	Panama	54	(15)
- * Club domestic league appearances and goals

Roberto Ronaldo Brown Perea (born July 15, 1977) is a Panamanian former professional footballer who played as a forward.

He was appointed assistant manager of sports of the Municipality of Panama in May 2014.

== Club career ==
Nicknamed el Bombardero, Brown spent the majority of his early career playing for numerous teams in Central America and Europe.

After leaving Panamanian team Ejecutivo Junior for Costa Rican side Cartaginés in 1996, he helped Real España to the runner-up spot of the Liga Nacional de Fútbol de Honduras in 1999. In summer 1999 he crossed borders to play for Salvadoran side FAS, only to leave them after the season and joined Alianza in summer 2000.

=== Europe ===
After moving to play in Europe for FC Sheriff Tiraspol in Moldova in 2002, won three consecutive Divizia Naţională titles, as well as the 2002 Moldavian Cup, in which he scored Sheriff's second goal in the final against Nistru Otaci. In September 2004, Brown was snapped up by Austrian side SV Wüstenrot Salzburg.

In August 2005, Brown joined Uruguayan giants Peñarol and in August 2006 he made his debut for fellow Uruguayans Tacuarembó.

In 2007 Brown signed with the Colorado Rapids in the Major League Soccer, and during his short tenure there tallied scored three goals in 13 games until eventually being released on July 12, 2007.

=== Montreal Impact ===
Brown signed with the Montreal Impact on July 30, 2007. He made his Impact debut on August 16 against the California Victory which he registered his first goal for the club in a 2–0 victory. For the remainder of the season he appeared in eight matches. In the playoffs Brown tallied one goal and one assist in the first game of the quarterfinal series against the Puerto Rico Islanders on September 14. In the following season Brown missed a series of nine matches due to a thigh injury and a suspension. But from his return he recorded one goal and two assists on June 22 against the Carolina RailHawks, the goal scored by Brown was the 300th Impact goal in history scored at home. In the Nutrilite Canadian Championship, Brown scored two goals and most notably the tying goal against Toronto FC on July 22 at BMO Field that clinched the 2008 Nutrilite Canadian Championship for the Impact, and helped the club qualify to the CONCACAF Champions League. During the Impact tenure in the Champions League, Brown played a dominant role in scoring crucial goals for the Impact throughout the tournament. In total he scored four goals out of eight games and helped the Impact reach the quarterfinals before losing out to Santos Laguna to 5–4 on aggregate.

On January 12, 2009 the Montreal Impact announced the re-signing of Brown for the 2009 season. During the 2009 USL season Brown contributed by helping the Impact clinch a playoff spot under new head coach Marc Dos Santos. He recorded his first playoff goal in the semifinal match against Puerto Rico Islanders. The match resulted in 2–1 victory for the Impact, and allowing the Impact to advance to the finals by winning their second match on aggregate. Montreal would advance on to the finals where their opponents would end up being the Vancouver Whitecaps FC, thus marking the first time in USL history where the final match would consist of two Canadian clubs. On October 17, 2009 in the second game of finals Brown scored the third and final goal for the Impact, therefore winning the match and claiming Montreal's third USL Championship. Brown had come to terms with Montreal to extend his contract for another year. On July 12, 2010 the Montreal Impact released Brown.

He later played for second division side Universidad Millenium and San Francisco where he came out an early retirement in June 2013 for another season at the club. He retired in November 2013.

== International career ==
Brown made his debut for the Panama national football team in January 2000 against Guatemala, immediately making an impact by scoring a goal. He earned a total of 54 caps, scoring 16 goals and represented his country in 17 FIFA World Cup qualification matches and played at the 2005 CONCACAF Gold Cup.

His final international was a January 2011 UNCAF Nations Cup match against El Salvador.

=== International goals ===
Scores and results list Panama's goal tally first.

#	Date	Venue	Opponent	Score	Result	Competition
1	19 January 2000	Estadio Rommel Fernández, Panama City, Panama	Guatemala	1–0	2–0	Friendly match
2	16 February 2000	Estadio Rommel Fernández, Panama City, Panama	El Salvador	2–1	4–1	Friendly match
3	16 February 2000	Estadio Rommel Fernández, Panama City, Panama	El Salvador	3–1	4–1	Friendly match
4	14 May 2000	Independence Park (Jamaica), Kingston, Jamaica, Jamaica	Jamaica	1–0	0–1	Friendly match
5	21 May 2000	Estadio Rommel Fernández, Panama City, Panama	Nicaragua	4–0	4–0	2002 FIFA World Cup qualification (CONCACAF)
6	1 July 2000	Estadio Alejandro Morera Soto, Alajuela, Costa Rica	Costa Rica	1–0	5–1	Friendly match
7	16 February 2003	Estadio Rommel Fernández, Panama City, Panama	Guatemala	2–0	2–0	2003 UNCAF Nations Cup
8	13 June 2004	Estadio Rommel Fernández, Panama City, Panama	Saint Lucia	4–0	4–0	2006 FIFA World Cup qualification (CONCACAF)
9	4 September 2004	Independence Park (Jamaica), Kingston, Jamaica, Jamaica	Jamaica	1–0	1–2	2006 FIFA World Cup qualification (CONCACAF)
10	8 September 2004	Estadio Rommel Fernández, Panama City, Panama	United States	1–0	1–1	2006 FIFA World Cup qualification (CONCACAF)
11	17 November 2004	Estadio Rommel Fernández, Panama City, Panama	El Salvador	1–0	3–0	2006 FIFA World Cup qualification (CONCACAF)
12	26 March 2005	Estadio Ricardo Saprissa Aymá, Tibás, Costa Rica	Costa Rica	1–1	2–1	2006 FIFA World Cup qualification (CONCACAF)
13	25 May 2005	Estadio Olímpico (Caracas), Caracas, Venezuela	Venezuela	1–1	1–1	Friendly match
14	20 January 2010	Estadio Municipal Francisco Sánchez Rumoroso, Coquimbo, Chile	Chile	1–2	2–1	Friendly match
15	14 January 2011	Estadio Rommel Fernández, Panama City, Panama	Belize	2–0	2–0	2011 Copa Centroamericana

== Honours ==
Montreal Impact

- Canadian Championship: 2008

Panama

- CONCACAF Gold Cup runner-up: 2005
