= Rohan Ricketts =

English footballer (born 1982)

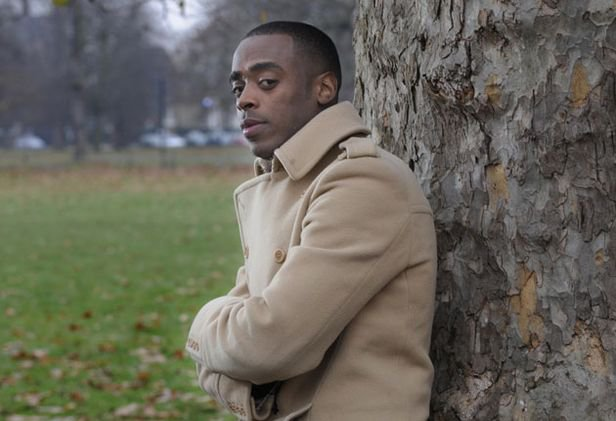
- Ricketts in 2012

Personal information
- Full name: Rohan Anthony Ricketts
- Date of birth: 22 December 1982 (age 43)
- Place of birth: Clapham, England
- Position: Attacking midfielder

Youth career
- 2000–2001: Arsenal

Senior career*
Years	Team	Apps	(Gls)
2001–2002	Arsenal	0	(0)
2002–2005	Tottenham Hotspur	30	(1)
2004–2005	→ Coventry City (loan)	6	(0)
2005	→ Wolverhampton Wanderers (loan)	7	(1)
2005–2007	Wolverhampton Wanderers	54	(0)
2007	→ Queens Park Rangers (loan)	8	(0)
2007–2008	Barnsley	10	(0)
2008–2009	Toronto FC	39	(4)
2010	Diósgyőri VTK	1	(0)
2010	Dacia Chişinău	4	(0)
2011	SV Wilhelmshaven	12	(1)
2011–2012	Shamrock Rovers	10	(2)
2012	Exeter City	1	(0)
2012	Dempo	10	(1)
2013	Quevedo	9	(0)
2014	PTT Rayong	7	(0)
2015	Eastern Sports Club	7	(1)
2016	Abahani Limited Dhaka	1	(1)
2016	Leatherhead	4	(1)
2018	Master's FA	4	(1)
2024	Unionville Milliken SC	4	(0)

International career
2000	England U18	8	(1)
2002	England U20	4	(0)
- * Club domestic league appearances and goals as of 13 July 2024

Rohan Anthony Ricketts (born 22 December 1982) is an English former professional footballer.

== Club career ==
=== Arsenal ===
Ricketts started out with Arsenal, with whom he won the FA Youth Cup in 2000 and 2001. He made one appearance for them, in the League Cup, against Manchester United.

=== Tottenham Hotspur ===
In 2002, he made the unusual step of joining Arsenal's rivals Tottenham Hotspur, and became just the fourth player to make the switch from Arsenal to Tottenham Hotspur and only the twelfth to appear for both sides since their formation.

Ricketts did not play a single game in his first season, but was a first-team regular in 2003–04 and his form saw him agree a one-year contract extension with the club in December 2003. Tord Grip was impressed with his ability and there was talk of him being called up to the senior England squad, but following on from Glenn Hoddle's sacking as Tottenham manager, Ricketts found his first team opportunities limited, despite being named Player of the Month in August and September for Tottenham. He scored one league goal during his time at Spurs, in a 2–1 win over Aston Villa in November 2003. He also scored once in the League Cup for Spurs, in a game against Coventry City.

==== Loan spells ====
The following season, under Jacques Santini and then Martin Jol, he found appearances harder to come by and had two loan spells, first at Coventry City, and then Wolverhampton Wanderers, linking up with his former manager, Glenn Hoddle. He scored once for Wolves, in a 2–1 win over Reading on 30 April 2005.

=== Wolves & Barnsley ===
In the summer of 2005 he moved to Molineux on a permanent basis. He had a loan spell at Queens Park Rangers in 2007 and was released by Wolves in May of the same year.

Ricketts signed a two-year deal with Championship side Barnsley in July 2007 but was released on 11 April 2008. That same day he was signed by Toronto FC of Major League Soccer.

=== Toronto FC ===
Rohan Ricketts scored his first two goals for Toronto FC against the Colorado Rapids on 14 June 2008. In 2008 Ricketts made 26 starts (27 total appearances) and scored four goals in the regular season; he added two more goals in the Canadian Championship.

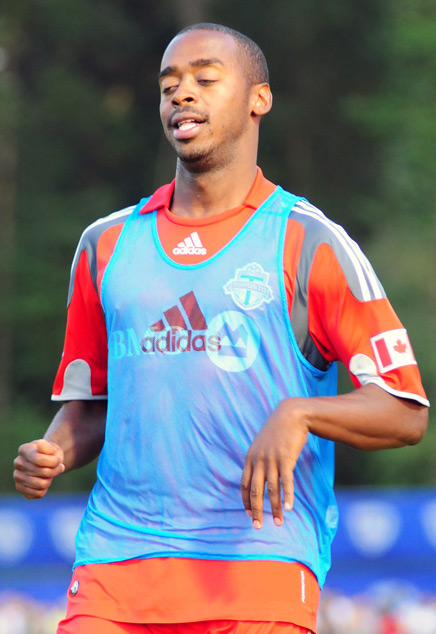
Ricketts with Toronto FC in 2009

In 2009, Ricketts was pushed down Toronto FC's depth chart due to the arrivals of Canadian international Dwayne DeRosario and young American Sam Cronin; in June, Toronto released Ricketts, clearing the salary cap space necessary for the club to sign Canadian international Ali Gerba.

Following his release from Toronto, Ricketts reportedly spurned interest from several English clubs to go on trial with Aberdeen in August 2009. Ricketts reportedly impressed during his trial—in particular in Aberdeen's 1–0 win over Hull City in a preseason friendly match—but budgetary constraints reportedly complicated the potential signing, and Ricketts ultimately did not remain with the club.

=== Later career ===
In early 2010 during the winter transfer market in Europe, Ricketts signed for Hungarian club Diósgyőri VTK. He made one first-team appearance as the club were relegated from Hungary's top professional league to the NB2. In August 2010 Ricketts signed for FC Dacia Chişinău of the Moldovan National Division. He made his debut the same month in a 0–0 draw against FC Academia UTM Chişinău.He left the club three months later, claiming he had not been paid.

Ricketts signed for German club SV Wilhelmshaven in January 2011, but left the club at the end of the 2010–11 season. He went on trial at two English clubs, Southend United and Stevenage, but did not sign for either. Instead Ricketts signed for League of Ireland champions Shamrock Rovers in August 2011. He made his first team debut away to Dundalk on 3 September and was involved in both goals, providing the cross for the first goal and the pass to win a penalty for the second goal in a 2–1 win. Ricketts played in the UEFA Europa League in a 3–1 defeat against former club Tottenham Hotspur. He was released from Shamrock Rovers in December 2011, after not being offered a new contract.

In March 2012, Ricketts sign a one-season contract with League One side Exeter City, but left the club before the end of the season after just one substitute appearance. Ricketts signed for defending I-League champions Dempo in August 2012. He announced on Twitter in January 2013 that he had resigned from Dempo, after he was suspended by the club for an outburst on Twitter. The same month he signed for Ecuadorian team Club Deportivo Quevedo, and made his debut for the club in a 1–1 draw against reigning champions Barcelona. His contract was terminated at the end of July 2013 after making nine appearances for the club.

Ricketts signed for PTT Rayong of the Thai Premier League in January 2014, but his contract was terminated by mutual agreement nine months later. In January 2015 he signed for Hong Kong Premier League side Eastern Sports Club. He then joined Bangladesh Premier League club Abahani Limited Dhaka in March 2016, returned to England to play for Leatherhead in November 2016, before leaving the club a month later .

Ahead of the 2018 League1 Ontario season, it was announced that Ricketts had returned to Canada to play for Master's Futbol. He did not return for the 2019 season.

In 2024, Ricketts returned to League1 Ontario to play for Unionville Milliken. He made 4 appearances across the 2024 League1 Ontario season.

== International career ==
Ricketts was capped by England at under-18 and under-20 level.

== Personal life ==
During the 2010 FIFA World Cup, he co-hosted The Hardcore Footy Show: South Africa 2010 with Brendan Dunlop, on Hardcore Sports Radio, Sirius 98 and was a regular on TSN for football. On 24 August 2010, Rohan joined the team of Canada's largest sports radio network, CJCL (Fan 590). He is currently a sports columnist with them. He also signed to write for online magazine, the Sabotage Times, on 29 August.

In May 2011, Ricketts launched his own (now defunct) online-only magazine, Column 10. The magazine, which includes a host of features on sport, music, film, fashion and more, has included exclusive interviews with football journalist Henry Winter, official FIFA Agent Charles Collymore and DJ Spoony. The magazine closed in 2015.

== Career statistics ==
As of match played on 21 May 2015

Appearances and goals by club, season and competition
Club	Season	League			National Cup		League Cup		Continental		Other		Total	
Club	Season	Division	Apps	Goals	Apps	Goals	Apps	Goals	Apps	Goals	Apps	Goals	Apps	Goals
Arsenal	2001–02	Premier League	0	0	0	0	1	0	0	0	—		1	0
Tottenham Hotspur	2002–03	Premier League	0	0	0	0	0	0	—		—		0	0
Tottenham Hotspur	2003–04	Premier League	24	1	0	0	4	1	—		—		28	2
Tottenham Hotspur	2004–05	Premier League	6	0	0	0	2	0	0	0	—		8	0
Tottenham Hotspur	Total		30	1	0	0	6	1	0	0	—		36	2
Coventry City (loan)	2004–05	Championship	6	0	0	0	0	0	—		—		6	0
Wolverhampton Wanderers (loan)	2004–05	Championship	7	1	0	0	0	0	—		—		7	1
Wolverhampton Wanderers	2005–06	Championship	25	0	0	0	1	0	—		—		26	0
Wolverhampton Wanderers	2006–07	Championship	19	0	3	0	1	0	—		—		23	0
Wolverhampton Wanderers	Total		51	1	3	0	2	0	—		—		56	1
Queens Park Rangers (loan)	2006–07	Championship	2	0	0	0	0	0	—		—		2	0
Barnsley	2007–08	Championship	10	0	1	0	2	0	—		—		13	0
Toronto FC	2008	Major League Soccer	27	4	4	2	—		—		—		31	6
Toronto FC	2009	Major League Soccer	12	0	1	0	—		—		—		13	0
Toronto FC	Total		39	4	5	2	—		—		—		44	6
Diósgyőri VTK	2009–10	Nemzeti Bajnokság I	1	0	0	0	—		—		—		1	0
Dacia Chişinău	2010–11	Moldovan National Division	4	0	0	0	—		—		—		4	0
SV Wilhelmshaven	2010–11	Regionalliga Nord	12	1	0	0	—		—		—		12	1
Shamrock Rovers	2011	League of Ireland	10	2	1	0	—		2 (Note: Appearances in UEFA Europa League)	0	—		13	2
Exeter City	2011–12	League One	1	0	0	0	0	0	—		0	0	1	0
Dempo	2012–13	I-League	10	1	0	0	—		—		—		10	1
Deportivo Quevedo	2013	Ecuadorian Serie A	9	0	0	0	—		—		—		9	0
PTT Rayong	2014	Thai Premier League	7	0	0	0	—		—		—		7	0
Eastern AA	2014–15	Hong Kong Premier League	7	0	2	0	2	1	—		2	0	13	1
Career total			199	10	12	2	13	2	2	0	2	0	228	14

== Honours ==
Arsenal

- FA Youth Cup: 2000, 2001

Toronto FC

- Canadian Championship: 2009

Shamrock Rovers

- League of Ireland: 2011

Eastern Sports Club

- Hong Kong Senior Shield: 2014–15

Individual

- Canadian Championship Golden Boot: 2008 (co-winner – two goals)
