= Nick Webb (soccer) =

American soccer player (born 1986)

- Nick Webb training with the Whitecaps in 2008

Personal information
- Full name: Nicholas Webb
- Date of birth: May 6, 1986 (age 40)
- Place of birth: Bellingham, Washington, United States
- Height: 5 ft 9 in (1.75 m)
- Position: Striker

Youth career
- 1996–2002: Whatcom FC Rangers
- 2000–2004: Squalicum Storm
- 2002–2004: Snohomish United

College career
| Years | Team | Apps | (Gls) |
| 2004–2005 | Western Washington Vikings | | |
| 2005–2007 | Oregon State Beavers | | |

Senior career*
| Years | Team | Apps | (Gls) |
| 2008 | Vancouver Whitecaps | 5 | (0) |
| 2008 | → Whitecaps Residency (loan) | 5 | (0) |
| 2008– | → Carolina Giants | 148 | (47) |
| 2009 | St. Cuthbert Wanderers F.C.(loan) | 14 | (19) |
- * Club domestic league appearances and goals

Nick Webb (born May 6, 1986) is a professional soccer player, who played as a striker for the Carolina Giants of the Puerto Rico Soccer League and the Vancouver Whitecaps of the USL First Division.

== Youth career ==
Webb began his youth career with local Premier Division team, Whatcom FC Rangers. During his development with the Rangers, he was selected to the Washington State Olympic Development Program from the ages 15–18 and was selected 1 year with the Region IV Olympic program pool. He finished his youth club play with top club, Snohomish United Santos. In College, he began his career at Division II Western Washington University earning NWAC First Team All Conference honors as a freshman before transferring to Division I Oregon State University. At Oregon State, Nick received top honors including Second Team All-Conference as well as First Team All-Academic both his Junior and Senior years. In the summer of 2007 he aided OUSA Orange of Oregon to a United States Adult Soccer Association (USASA) Under-23 National Championship and was the league's leading scorer with 17 goals in 7 games including the game winner in the National Championship.

== Professional career ==
Webb signed with the Vancouver Whitecaps of the USL First Division on February 27, 2008. Webb has been seen playing time as a substitute for the Whitecaps early on in the season, and has also been featured for Whitecaps' PDL team, Vancouver Whitecaps Residency. In his first game against MLS squad Los Angeles Galaxy and David Beckham he recorded the game winning assist in the Whitecaps 2–1 win over the Galaxy.

After a spell at Vancouver, Webb signed with Carolina Giants, a Puerto Rican-based First Division club. In his time with the Gigantes, Nick totaled four goals and an assist in six games.

== Personal life ==
He is the twin brother of Mason Webb. Webb also runs his own soccer training program Webb Soccer Training in Corvallis, Oregon.
