= Alfredo Valente =

Canadian soccer player (born 1980)

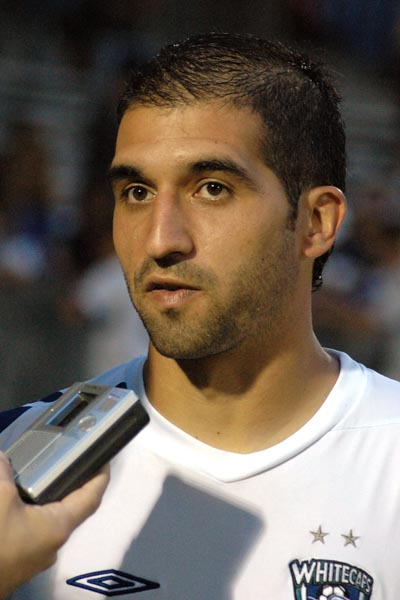

Personal information
- Full name: Alfredo Valente
- Date of birth: November 6, 1980 (age 45)
- Place of birth: Burnaby, British Columbia, Canada
- Height: 5 ft 6 in (1.68 m)
- Position: Midfielder

Team information
- Current team: Coquitlam Metro-Ford Wolves (Youth Head Coach)
- Number: 9

Youth career
- Coquitlam Metro-Ford Soccer Club
- Alpha Secondary School

Senior career*
| Years | Team | Apps | (Gls) |
| 1998–2008 | Vancouver 86ers/Whitecaps | 271 | (35) |
| 1998–2000 | Edmonton Drillers (indoor) | 34 | (10) |

International career^{‡}
| 1998 | Canada U-20 | 1 | (0) |

Managerial career
- 2005–: Coquitlam Metro-Ford Wolves (Youth Head Coach)
- * Club domestic league appearances and goals as of September 27, 2008 ‡ National team caps and goals as of May 19, 2006

Alfredo Valente (born November 6, 1980) is a former Canadian soccer midfielder who formerly played for the Vancouver Whitecaps of the USL First Division (USL-1). Valente played 11 seasons with the 86ers/Whitecaps organization, winning USL championships with the club in 2006 and 2008. He also played indoor soccer with the Edmonton Drillers of the National Professional Soccer League (NPSL) early in his professional career. Internationally, Valente has represented Canada with the under-18, under-20 and under-23 national teams.

== Early life ==
Growing up in Burnaby, British Columbia, a neighbouring city east of Vancouver, Valente began playing soccer at the age of four years. He joined the local youth and amateur Coquitlam Metro-Ford Soccer Club (CMFSC) program at 12 and debuted with the men's team in the Vancouver Metro Soccer League's Premier division three years later.

Valente attended and graduated from Alpha Secondary School in Burnaby, where he also played for the high school's soccer club, the Aztecs, leading them to a provincial championship.

== Club career ==
Valente was drafted by the Vancouver 86ers (renamed to the Whitecaps in 2001) as the club's top pick in the 1998 A-League Player Draft. He made his professional debut with the 86ers at the age of 17 years in the USISL A-League and scored four goals in 14 games to be named Vancouver's top rookie that year in 1998. He recorded his best season with the 86ers in 2000, leading the team in scoring with 10 goals. In 2002, Valente led Vancouver in assists with 10, finishing tied for fifth overall in the USL First Division.

Under the leadership of head coach Bob Lilley, hired in 2004, Valente's playing time began to decrease. He did not get off the bench in the 2005 playoffs. The next season, however, after scoring a goal and an assist in the regular season, he started the title game against the Rochester Raging Rhinos; Valente helped the Whitecaps to their first USL championship, defeating Rochester 3–0. Attempting to defend the Whitecaps' league title in 2007, Valente appeared in 24 games, while starting in 14. Coming off the bench in the club's two playoff games, Valente and the Whitecaps were defeated in the quarterfinals.

On February 7, 2008, the Whitecaps re-signed Valente for an 11th season. At the time of the signing, he ranked seventh in Vancouver's all-time combined playoff and regular season scoring list with 32 goals and 35 assists in 234 games. As Lilley was replaced by Icelandic Teitur Thordarson as head coach, Valente's playing time increased, becoming a regular starter. After finishing with the second best regular season record in 2008, the Whitecaps won their second USL championship in three years, defeating the Puerto Rico Islanders 2–1 at Swangard Stadium on October 12, 2008. Valente was instrumental in the Whitecaps first goal in the 56th minute, directing a corner into the Islanders' box, where Charles Gbeke headed the ball in.

Several months later, Valente was released by the Whitecaps, as the club chose against his 2009 contract option, on December 8, 2008, along with fellow veterans Steve Kindel and Jeff Clarke. Club president Bob Lenarduzzi and coach Thordarson cited "philosophical differences" for the roster changes. Valente left the Whitecaps second all-time in franchise assists. At the end of the 2008 season, Valente, Kindel and Clarke, all long-time members of the club, had voiced their concerns over Thordarson's coaching style in separate one-on-one meetings with him.

Following his release from the Whitecaps, Valente rejoined the Coquitlam Metro-Ford Wolves of the Vancouver Metro Soccer League's Premier Division in 2009. He has been involved with CMFSC, his old youth and amateur soccer club, since 2005 as youth coach and head coach of technical operations, as well.

== International career ==
Valente has represented Canada with the under-18, under-20 and Olympic under-23 national teams. He played with Canada's U-18s for a tournament in Italy in March 1998 and the U-20s several months later in August 1998. The following year, he was chosen to represent Canada at the 1999 Pan American Games in Winnipeg. In 2000, Valente went on tour with the Canadian Olympic team in Mexico as a 19-year-old.

== Personal life ==
Alfredo is married to Kristen Valente and has a son, Noah, born on December 19, 2007.

== Honors ==
Vancouver Whitecaps

- USL First Division Championship (2): 2006, 2008
- Named Vancouver 86ers Top Rookie in 1998.
- Led Vancouver Whitecaps in goals (10) in 2000.
- Led Vancouver Whitecaps in assists (10) in 2002.
- Won a USL First Division championship in 2006 and 2008.
