= Severino Jefferson =

Brazilian footballer (born 1985)

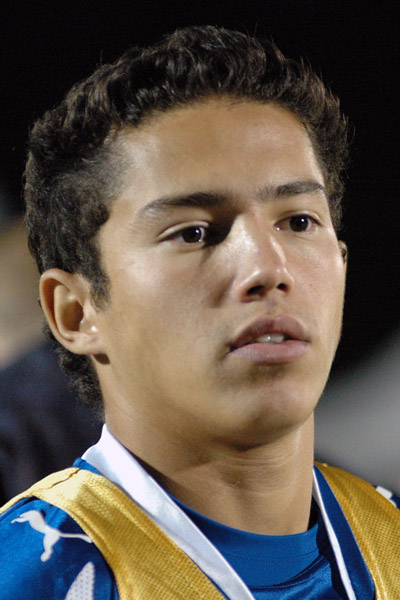

Personal information
- Date of birth: 29 October 1985 (age 41)
- Place of birth: Campinas, Brazil
- Position: Striker

Senior career*
Years	Team	Apps	(Gls)
2003	Guarani		
2003	São Paulo		
2003	Nova Venécia		
2004–2005	Parma	0	(0)
2005–2006	SC YF Juventus		
2006–2007	APEP Pitsilia		
2007–2008	Ayia Napa		
2008–2009	Montreal Impact	25	(3)
- * Club domestic league appearances and goals as of 23:24, 26 April 2009 (UTC)

Severino Jefferson (born 29 October 1985) is a Brazilian professional footballer who last played in Canada for the Montreal Impact.

== Career ==
He has previously played in Brazil for Guarani, São Paulo and Nova Venécia, in Italy for Parma, in Switzerland for SC YF Juventus, and in Cyprus for APEP Pitsilia and Ayia Napa.
