= Admir Salihović =

Bosnian footballer

Personal information
- Full name: Admir Salihović
- Date of birth: 15 November 1989 (age 36)
- Place of birth: Tuzla, SR Bosnia and Herzegovina, SFR Yugoslavia
- Height: 5 ft 9 in (1.75 m)
- Position: Midfielder

Senior career*
Years	Team	Apps	(Gls)
	Langara College	18	(8)
	Caps Residency	5	(1)
	Vancouver Whitecaps	10	(2)
	HNK Sloga Uskoplje	5	(2)
	HNK Šibenik	5	(0)
	Iskra Bugojno	15	(7)
	HNK Čapljina	15	(4)
	TSV Hartberg	13	(0)

International career^{‡}
2008	Bosnia and Herzegovina U21	1	
- * Club domestic league appearances and goals as of 2 December 2013 ‡ National team caps and goals as of 19 March 2014

Admir Salihović (born 15 November 1989) is a Bosnian footballer who plays for EDC FC Burnaby in the Vancouver Metro Soccer League.

== Career ==
Salihović can play on the left or right-hand side of midfield, he joined the Whitecaps after signing a one-year professional contract with the club. He holds dual citizen of Bosnia and Canada, he has received an invite to play for the Bosnia & Herzegovina U-21 side, but the midfielder has so far not taken the opportunity to play for the country of his birth.

In the summer of 2005, Salihović trained with Bosnian Premijer Liga club FK Željeznicar, which is based in the Bosnian capital of Sarajevo.

He moved from his hometown of Tuzla with his family to the Lower Mainland in 2000. The midfielder has been in the Bachelor of Business Administration (BBA) degree program at Langara College since the fall of 2006, he played 2004 with the Burnaby Selects. Salihović joined than in summer 2009 to Croatia and signed here 28 June 2009 a contract with HNK Šibenik.

He has just signed to TSV Hartberg on January 24, 2012 and has become TSV Hartberg's first signing in the winter transfer window. TSV Hartberg is an Austrian Association Football club based in Hartberg, founded in 1946, which is currently playing in the Austrian Football First League.

== Personal life ==
His parents are Fikreta and Osman Salihović, and he has an older brother named Alen, who was a former 400 and 800 meters track & field runner with Bosnian club FK Sloboda Tuzla.
