= List of people from Bellingham, Washington =

The following is a list of notable Bellingham residents, those people of recognition who have lived in Bellingham, Washington.

== Living in Bellingham ==
- AeTopus (Bryan Tewell Hughes), electronic music composer and producer (works and resides in Bellingham)
- Tim Alexander, drummer of the rock band Primus, 1989–1996, 2003–2010, 2013–present
- James Bertolino, poet
- Robert Blake, Celtic folk singer (born in and currently resides in Bellingham)
- Luke Burbank, host of the syndicated variety radio show Live Wire Radio and the podcast Too Beautiful to Live; correspondent for CBS News Sunday Morning
- Garth Butcher, former NHL hockey player
- Mary Gregg Byrne, painter
- Misha Collins, actor, Supernatural
- Darren G. Davis, comic book writer and publisher of Bluewater Productions
- George Dyson, nonfiction author
- R. W. Goodwin, senior executive producer of The X-Files
- Yolanda Hughes-Heying, IFBB professional bodybuilder
- Steve Martini, novelist
- Krissy Moehl, ultramarathon runner
- George Nelson, astronaut
- Tim Niemier, kayak designer
- Ryan Stiles, actor and comedian; producer of Whose Line Is It Anyway? (resides and performs in Bellingham)
- Hilary Swank, actor; winner of Academy Award for Best Actress in 2000 and 2005
- David Tucker, geologist and research associate for WWU
- Christopher Wise, author

== Born in Bellingham ==
- Danny Abramowicz, former NFL wide receiver
- Tom Ackerman, former NFL center
- A. A. Adams, member of the Washington State House of Representatives 1969–1981
- Bob Arbogast, deceased radio-television host and voice actor
- Trey Azagthoth, guitarist for Morbid Angel
- Steve Baker, award-winning Grand Prix motorcyclist
- Graham Boettcher, director of the Birmingham Museum of Art
- Billy Burke, film and television actor
- Brett Cooper, political commentator and actress
- William Dickey, deceased poet
- Muir S. Fairchild, former United States Air Force vice chief of staff
- Sid Flanagan, State representative
- Bernie Fryer, former NBA and ABA basketball player
- Lawrence Alexander Glenn, deceased bishop
- Alfred Goodwin, judge
- Diana Hansen-Young, artist and playwright
- Ryan Hietala, professional golfer
- Paul Jessup, former world record holder in discus throw
- Jake Locker, former NFL quarterback (Titans)
- Clarence Marshall, deceased American League relief pitcher
- Philip McCracken, sculptor
- Tommy Noonan, film and television actor
- James K. Okubo, Medal of Honor recipient
- Doug Pederson, former NFL quarterback, Super Bowl-winning head coach (Eagles)
- Roger Repoz, professional baseball player
- Merrill Sanford, former mayor of Juneau, Alaska
- Gene Savoy, deceased explorer
- Lyle Saxon, journalist
- Sarah Schwald, distance runner
- Jim Sterk, athletic director for Missouri
- Geoff Stradling, jazz pianist and composer
- Ty Taubenheim, Major League pitcher
- Paul E. Toms, Christian author, minister
- Dan Van Dyk (1942–2004), Washington state representative
- Maury Van Vliet, deceased P.E. director at the University of British Columbia
- Don Warren, former NFL tight end
- Mason Webb, Pioneer Football League (soccer) central midfielder
- Nick Webb, Puerto Rico Soccer League striker
- Ben Weber, film and television actor

== Raised in Bellingham ==
- Daniel Anderson, founding member of Idiot Pilot
- Jon Auer, member of The Posies and Big Star
- Glenn Beck, radio/television host of The Glenn Beck Program; attended Sehome High School
- Mel Hein, award-winning deceased NFL offensive lineman (attended Fairhaven High School)
- Jeff Hovenier, diplomat
- Erik Larsen, comic book writer
- Bear McCreary, Emmy-winning film/television composer best known for Battlestar Galactica (attended Bellingham High School)
- Stephen S. Oswald, astronaut
- Taylor Rapp, NFL safety, Los Angeles Rams, Buffalo Bills (current)
- Ken Stringfellow, member of The Posies, R.E.M., and Big Star; attended Sehome High School
- Hilary Swank, Academy Award-winning actress (attended Sehome High School)

== Lived in Bellingham ==
- Samuel Altshuler, clothing merchant
- Thom Bell, record producer, arranger, and songwriter known as one of the creators of Philadelphia soul in the 1970s
- Kenneth Bianchi, a Hillside Strangler (worked in Fred Meyer as a security guard)
- Carrie Brownstein, lead actress of Portlandia; lead guitarist/singer for Wild Flag and Sleater-Kinney (attended Western Washington University)
- Harriett Davenport, Los Angeles, California, City Council member, 1953–55
- Death Cab for Cutie, band formed in Bellingham 1997, some songs reference it
- Dan Erickson, Emmy-nominated creator of Severance
- Mitch Friedman, founded Conservation Northwest in Bellingham; now lives in Seattle
- Robert Fulghum, minister at Bellingham Unitarian Fellowship
- Ben Gibbard, lead singer of Death Cab for Cutie (attended Western Washington University)
- Nick Harmer, band member in Death Cab for Cutie (attended Western Washington University)
- Penelope Houston, member of the Avengers (attended Fairhaven College)
- Paul Karason, blue-skinned sufferer of argyria
- Larry Knechtel, keyboard player and bassist; member of the Wrecking Crew; member of band Bread (lived in Maple Falls)
- Lee Boyd Malvo, a Beltway sniper
- Jason McGerr, band member in Death Cab for Cutie (attended Western Washington University)
- Albert E. Mead, fifth governor of Washington State
- John Allen Muhammad, a Beltway sniper
- Homer Nunamaker, state representative
- Odesza, band formed while members attended Western Washington University
- Chuck Pratt, rock climber
- Chris Walla, band member in Death Cab for Cutie (attended Western Washington University)
- Bernie Worrell, keyboardist and composer; founding member of Parliament

== Died in Bellingham ==
- Noémi Ban, Holocaust survivor and lecturer
- Isaac Smith Kalloch, mayor of San Francisco
- Paul Gruwell, film director and animator
- Lulu Roman, comedic actress and singer. Best known for appearing on Hee Haw

== History of Bellingham ==
- Julius Bloedel (1864–1957), businessman
- Dirty Dan Harris (c. 1833–1890), founder of Fairhaven
- C. X. Larrabee (1843–1914), businessman
- George Pickett (1825–1875), Confederate general
