= List of songs recorded by Mischief Brew =

The following is a list of songs recorded by Mischief Brew organized by alphabetical order. Next to the song titles is the album, soundtrack or single on which it appears. Songs by Kettle Rebellion (recorded in 2002, released in 2014) and The Orphans are also listed on this page.

Contents:	Top – A B C D E F G H J L M N O P R S T V W Y

== A ==
1. "Against" (Two Boxcars, 2005)
2. "Ahmet" with Guignol (Fight Dirty, 2009)
3. "Ain't It The Life?" (Smash The Windows, 2005)
4. "A Lawless World" (The Stone Operation, 2011)
5. "A Liquor Never Brewed" with Guignol (Smash The Windows, 2005)
  - "A Liquor Never Brewed" (Don't Spoil Yer Supper!, 2003)
  - "A Liquor Never Brewed" (Live in Ray's Basement, 2002)
  - "A Liquor Never Brewed" (Live on WKDU 91.7 FM, 2001)
  - "A Liquor Never Brewed" (Kettle Rebellion, 2014)
  - "A Liquor Never Brewed" (Mirth…, 2000)
  - "A Liquor Never Brewed (Demo)" (Boiling Breakfast Early, 2008)
6. "All About The Class War" (Oh Sweet Misery, 2005)
  - "All About The Class War" (Art Of The Underground: Single Series Vol. 1, 2006)
  - "All About The Class War" (Art Of The Underground: Single Series Vol. 2, 2014)
7. "All Our Comrades" (Songs From Under The Sink, 2006)
  - "All Our Comrades (Rough Mix)" (Thanks, Bastards!…, 2014)
8. "An Open Letter To The North American Continent" (Photographs +2, 2014) (Note: Cover of Mancub's "An Open Letter To The North American Continent.")
9. "Anorexic Mind" (Raise The Youth, 2004)
10. "Anti-Lullaby" (Bacchanal 'N' Philadelphia, 2016)
  - "Anti-Lullaby" (Bakenal, 2003)
  - "Anti-Lullaby" (Don't Spoil Yer Supper!, 2003)
  - "Anti-Lullaby" (Live in Ray's Basement, 2002)
  - "Anti-Lullaby" (Live on WKDU 91.7 FM, 2001)
  - "Anti-Lullaby" (Mirth…, 2000)
  - "Anti-Lullaby (Demo)" (Boiling Breakfast Early, 2008)
11. "A Peasant's Rebellion" (Photographs +2, 2014)
12. "Appel Direct" with Guignol (Fight Dirty, 2009)
13. "A Rebel's Romance" (Songs From Under The Sink, 2006)
  - "A Rebels Romance" (Don't Spoil Yer Supper!, 2003)
  - "A Rebel's Romance (Demo)" (Boiling Breakfast Early, 2008)
14. "Away With Purity" (Kettle Rebellion, 2014)

== B ==
1. "Bad Heart" (This Is Not For Children, 2015)
2. "Bag Of Pepper" (bonus track on Smash The Windows, 2005)
3. "Bang-Up Policework" (Rhapsody For Knives, 2012)
4. "Banks Of Marble" (Photographs from the Shoebox, 2008)
5. "Barratry Call" (Kettle Rebellion, 2014)
  - "Barratry Call" (Don't Spoil Yer Supper!, 2003)
  - "Barratry Call" (Mirth…, 2000)
  - "Barratry Call (Demo)" (Boiling Breakfast Early, 2008)
6. "Big Brother, Bigger Mother" (Raise The Youth, 2004)
7. "Boycott Me!" (Bacchanal 'N' Philadelphia, 2016)
  - "Boycott Me!" (Bellingham & Philadelphia, 2003)
  - "Boycott Me!" (Don't Spoil Yer Supper!, 2003)
  - "Boycott Me!" (Live in Ray's Basement, 2002)
  - "Boycott Me! (Demo)" (Boiling Breakfast Early, 2008)
8. "Branks" with Guignol (Fight Dirty, 2009)
9. "Bury Me In Analog" (Photographs from the Shoebox, 2008)
  - "Bury Me In Analog (4-track demo)" (Thanks, Bastards!…, 2014)
10. "Business To Attend To" (Raise The Youth, 2004)
11. "Busker's Wages" (The Stone Operation, 2011)
  - "Busker's Wages (Acoustic Demo)" (Thanks, Bastards!…, 2014)
12. "Buy Your Logic" (Raise The Youth, 2004)

== C ==
1. "Carried Away" (Free Radical Radio Fever, 2013)
2. "Catch Fire" (Rhapsody For Knives, 2012)
3. "Children Play With Matches" (Songs From Under The Sink, 2006)
4. "Citizens Drive" (Smash The Windows, 2005)
5. "City of Black Fridays" (This Is Not For Children, 2015)
6. "Coffee, God, And Cigarettes" (Songs From Under The Sink, 2006)
7. "Create Destroy" with Guignol (Fight Dirty, 2009)

== D ==
1. "Dallas In Romania" (The Stone Operation, 2011)
2. "Danger: Falling Pianos" (This Is Not For Children, 2015)
3. "Departure Arrival" (Smash The Windows, 2005)
4. "Devil Of A Time" (Bacchanal 'N' Philadelphia, 2016)
  - "Devil Of A Time" (Bakenal, 2003)
5. "Devil's Toast (Unreleased Demo)" (Boiling Breakfast Early, 2008)
6. "Dirty Overhauls" (O, Pennsyltucky!, 2014) (Note: Cover of Woody Guthrie's "Dirty Overhauls.")
7. "Dirty Pennies" (Bacchanal 'N' Philadelphia, 2016)
  - "Dirty Pennies" (Bellingham & Philadelphia, 2003)
8. "Dirty Penny's Pogo" with Guignol (Fight Dirty, 2009)
  - "Dirty Penny's Pogo (Demo)" (Thanks, Bastards!…, 2014)
9. "Doomsday Evening" (Kettle Rebellion, 2014)
10. "Drinking Song From The Home Stretch" (The Stone Operation, 2011)
11. "Drinking Song From The Tomb" (bonus track on The Stone Operation, 2011)

== E ==
1. "Elbow Problem" (Raise The Youth, 2004)
2. "Every Town Will Celebrate" (Bacchanal 'N' Philadelphia, 2016)
  - "Every Town Will Celebrate" (Bellingham & Philadelphia, 2003)
  - "Every Town Will Celebrate" (Live in Ray's Basement, 2002)

== F ==
1. "Fare Well, Good Fellows" (Bacchanal 'N' Philadelphia, 2016)
  - "Fare Well, Good Fellows" (Bellingham & Philadelphia, 2003)
2. "Fight Dirty" with Guignol (Fight Dirty, 2009)
3. "For An Old Kentucky Anarchist" (Raise The Youth, 2004)
  - "For An Old Kentucky Anarchist" (Live in Ray's Basement, 2002)
  - "For An Old Kentucky Anarchist" (Live on WKDU 91.7 FM, 2001)
4. "Free Radical Radio Fever" (Free Radical Radio Fever, 2013)
5. "From The Rooftops" (Smash The Windows, 2005)
  - "From The Rooftops" (Don't Spoil Yer Supper!, 2003)

== G ==
1. "Gather Ye Acorns" (Photographs from the Shoebox, 2008)
2. "Gimme Coffee, Or Death" (Songs From Under The Sink, 2006)
3. "Gonzalez, The Explosive Chilean" with Guignol (Fight Dirty, 2009)
4. "Goodbye Under God" (Two Boxcars, 2005)
  - "Goodbye Under God (Alternate Mix)" (Thanks, Bastards!…, 2014)
5. "Gratitude And Thanks" (Songs From Under The Sink, 2006)

== H ==
1. "Hallowed Be Thy Name" with Guignol (Fight Dirty, 2009)
2. "How Did I Get Our Alive?" (Songs From Under The Sink, 2006)

== J ==
1. "Jobs In Steeltown" (Jobs In Steeltown, 2008)
  - "Jobs In Steeltown (Early Outtake)" (Thanks, Bastards!…, 2014)

== L ==
1. "Labor Day Massacre" (Photographs from the Shoebox, 2008)
2. "Lancaster Avenue Blues" (This Is Not For Children, 2015)
3. "Liberty Unmasked" (Bacchanal 'N' Philadelphia, 2016)
  - "Liberty Unmasked" (Bellingham & Philadelphia, 2003)
  - "Liberty Unmasked" (Don't Spoil Yer Supper!, 2003)
  - "Liberty Unmasked" (Live on WKDU 91.7 FM, 2001)
  - "Liberty Unmasked (Radio Performance)" (Boiling Breakfast Early, 2008)
4. "Lightning Knock The Power Out" (Smash The Windows, 2005)
5. "Love And Rage" (Songs From Under The Sink, 2006)
6. "Lucky Number 31" (The Stone Operation, 2011)

== M ==
1. "Molding Our Son" (Raise The Youth, 2004)
2. "Mr. Crumb" with Guignol (Fight Dirty, 2009)
3. "My Hometown (Demo)" (Thanks, Bastards!…, 2014)

== N ==
1. "Nevada City Serenade" (The Stone Operation, 2011)
2. "No Candlesticks" (This Is Not For Children, 2015)
3. "Nomads Revolt" (Smash The Windows, 2005)
  - "Nomads Revolt II" (Loved, But Unrespected, 2006)
4. "No More Government" (bonus on Raise The Youth, 2004)

== O ==
1. "Off The Books" with Guignol (Fight Dirty, 2009)
2. "Oh Sweet Misery" (Oh Sweet Misery, 2005)
  - "Oh Sweet Misery" (Art Of The Underground: Single Series Vol. 1, 2006)
  - "Oh Sweet Misery" (Art Of The Underground: Single Series Vol. 2, 2014)
3. "Olde Tyme Mem'ry" (Bacchanal 'N' Philadelphia, 2016)
  - "Olde Tyme Mem'ry" (Bellingham & Philadelphia, 2003)
4. "One Stone Cast (Demo)" (Boiling Breakfast Early, 2008)
  - "One Stone Cast (Rehearsal)" (Boiling Breakfast Early, 2008)
  - "One Stone Cast" (Mirth…, 2000)
5. "On Freedom (A Carol)" (Rhapsody For Knives, 2012)
6. "O, Pennsyltucky!" (This Is Not For Children, 2015)
  - "O, Pennsyltucky!" (O, Pennsyltucky!, 2014)
7. "On The Sly" (The Stone Operation, 2011)
8. "Out!" (Raise The Youth, 2004)
9. "Outwitted" (Raise The Youth, 2004)

== P ==
1. "Paris Warlike" (The Stone Operation, 2011)
2. "Patches" (Partners In Crime #2, 2009)
3. "Pete Merak" with Guignol (Fight Dirty, 2009)
4. "Plastic Threat" (Raise The Youth, 2004)
5. "Pompous Ass Manifesto" (The Stone Operation, 2011)
  - "Pompous-Ass Manifesto (Demo)" (Thanks, Bastards!…, 2014)
6. "Punx Win!" (Punx Win!, 2009)
  - "Punx Win! (Acoustic)" (Punx Win!, 2009)
  - "Punx Win! (Acoustic Demo)" (Thanks, Bastards!…, 2014)

== R ==
1. "Raise The Youth" (Raise The Youth, 2004)
2. "Rambler's Ghost" (Bacchanal 'N' Philadelphia, 2016)
  - "Rambler's Ghost" (Bakenal, 2003)
3. "Roll Me Through The Gates Of Hell" (Smash The Windows, 2005)
  - "No Followers" (Live on WKDU 91.7 FM, 2001)
  - "No Followers (Radio Performance)" (Boiling Breakfast Early, 2008)
  - "Roll Me Through The Gates Of Hell" (Bacchanal 'N' Philadelphia, 2016)
  - "Roll Me Through The Gates Of Hell" (Bakenal, 2003)

== S ==
1. "Save A City..." (Songs From Under The Sink, 2006)
2. "Seeking The Brave" (Kettle Rebellion, 2014)
3. "Slow Death Hymn" (This Is Not For Children, 2015)
4. "Smash Potwatching!" (Photographs from the Shoebox, 2008)
5. "Solidarity Interlude" (Songs From Under The Sink, 2006)
6. "Squatter Envy" (This Is Not For Children, 2015)
7. "Storming The Sandcastles" (Kettle Rebellion, 2014)
8. "Stuff's Weird" (The Stone Operation, 2011)
9. "Sugar Park Tavern Death Song"
10. "Swing Against The Nazis" (Smash The Windows, 2005)

== T ==
1. "Tell Me A Story" (Songs From Under The Sink, 2006)
2. "Ten Thousand Fleas" (Smash The Windows, 2005)
  - "Ten Thousand Fleas (4-track Demo)" (Thanks, Bastards!…, 2014)
3. "Thanks, Bastards!" (Songs From Under The Sink, 2006)
  - "Thanks, Bastards! (Rough Mix)" (Thanks, Bastards!…, 2014)
4. "The Anthem For A Doomed Public" (Raise The Youth, 2004)
5. "The Ballad Of The Cloth" (Free Radical Radio Fever, 2013)
6. "The Barking Drunkards" with Guignol (Fight Dirty, 2009)
7. "The Barrel" (Jobs In Steeltown, 2008)
  - "The Barrel (Early Outtake)" (Thanks, Bastards!…, 2014)
8. "The Dreams Of The Morning" (Songs From Under The Sink, 2006)
  - "The Dreams Of The Morning" (Live on WKDU 91.7 FM, 2001)
9. "The Drunk Of Three Nights" (Bacchanal 'N' Philadelphia, 2016)
  - "The Drunk Of Three Nights" (Bakenal, 2003)
10. "The Elusive Higgs" with Guignol (Fight Dirty, 2009)
11. "The Gambler (Unreleased Demo)" (Boiling Breakfast Early, 2008)
12. "The Government Stole My Germs CD" (Raise The Youth, 2004)
13. "The Gypsy, The Punk, And The Fool (A Tale)" (Smash The Windows, 2005)
14. "The Lowly Carpenter" (Smash The Windows, 2005)
  - "The Lowly Carpenter" (Live on WKDU 91.7 FM, 2001)
  - "The Lowly Carpenter (Acoustic Mix)" (bonus track on Smash The Windows, 2005)
  - "The Lowly Carpenter (Acoustic Mix)" (Thanks, Bastards!…, 2014)
  - "The Lowly Carpenter (Radio Performance)" (Boiling Breakfast Early, 2008)
15. "The Mary Ellen Carter" (Under The Table, 2013) (Note: Cover of Stan Rogers' "The Mary Ellen Carter.")
16. "The Master Is A Drunkard" (Kettle Rebellion, 2014)
  - "The Master Is A Drunkard" (Live in Ray's Basement, 2002)
  - "The Master Is A Drunkard" (Live on WKDU 91.7 FM, 2001)
  - "The Master Is A Drunkard" (Mirth…, 2000)
  - "The Master Is A Drunkard (Demo)" (Boiling Breakfast Early, 2008)
17. "The Midnight Special 2002" (Songs From Under The Sink, 2006)
18. "The Preacher & The Slave" (Loved, But Unrespected, 2006)
19. "The Reinvention Of The Printing Press" (Smash The Windows, 2005)
20. "The Stone Worker" (Mirth…, 2000)
  - "The Stone Worker" (Live on WKDU 91.7 FM, 2001)
  - "The Stone Worker (Demo) (Boiling Breakfast Early, 2008)
21. "The Tardy Barker" with Guignol (Fight Dirty, 2009)
  - "The Tardy Barker (Demo)" (Thanks, Bastards!…, 2014)
22. "They" (Raise The Youth, 2004)
23. "This Girl (Acoustic Demo)" (Thanks, Bastards!…, 2014)
24. "This Is Not For Children" (This Is Not For Children, 2015)
25. "Three Chord Circus" (The Stone Operation, 2011)
  - "Three Chord Circus (Demo)" (Thanks, Bastards!…, 2014)
26. "Together All The Way" (Live in Ray's Basement, 2002)
27. "Two Nickels" (This Is Not For Children, 2015)

== V ==
1. "Victory Dance Of The Outlanders" (Kettle Rebellion, 2014)
  - "Victory Dance Of The Outlanders" (Live in Ray's Basement, 2002)
  - "Victory Dance Of The Outlanders (Demo)" (Boiling Breakfast Early, 2008)
  - "Victory Dance Of The Outlanders (Demo)" (Mirth…, 2000)
2. "Virus One" (Raise The Youth, 2004)

== W ==
1. "Waste Of Breath" (Raise The Youth, 2004)
2. "Watching Scotty Die" (Photographs from the Shoebox, 2008)
3. "Way Of Life" (Raise The Youth, 2004)
4. "Weapons" (Mirth…, 2000)
  - "Renaissance / Weapons" (Live in Ray's Basement, 2002)
  - "Weapons" (Don't Spoil Yer Supper!, 2003)
  - "Weapons" (Live on WKDU 91.7 FM, 2001)
  - "Weapons (Demo)" (Boiling Breakfast Early, 2008)
5. "We Are The Ground" (O, Pennsyltucky!, 2014)
6. "What Reason Have They To Dance?" (Raise The Youth, 2004)
  - "What Reason Have They To Dance?" (Live in Ray's Basement, 2002)
7. "When It Rains" with Guignol (Fight Dirty, 2009)
8. "While You Were Out" (Raise The Youth, 2004)

== Y ==
1. "Your Customers" (Raise The Youth, 2004)
