= Philip Trager =

American photographer (born 1935)

Philip Trager (born 1935) is an American art photographer, known principally for his photographs of architecture and of modern dance. As of 2015, 11 monographs of his photography have been published by houses such as New York Graphic Society; Little, Brown; Wesleyan University Press; and Steidl.

The transfer of Trager's archive of photographic prints, negatives, and marked proofs to the Library of Congress began in 2006. As C. Ford Peatross — founding director and curator for the Library of Congress's Center for Architecture, Design and Engineering — remarked: "[Trager's] careful eye, his sensitivity to the slightest nuances of light and atmosphere and his finely honed understanding of structure have allowed him to capture—and us to see anew—subjects ranging from the gritty vernacular of American cities to the works of Palladio and the monuments of Paris, from the clouds framing and defining landscapes to frozen moments in the drama of the dance." Once the transfer of Trager's work is complete, “this exceptional trove of artistic images will be available to scholars, photographers, and the public for generations to come.”

== Biography ==
Trager was born in 1935 in Bridgeport, Connecticut, where he attended high school. He completed his undergraduate studies in history at Wesleyan University, which conferred an honorary Doctor of Arts degree on him in 2008. He next attended Columbia University School of Law in New York. He pursued dual careers in law and photography until 1992, when he ceased practicing law and commenced devoting his focus to photography exclusively.

Trager lives in Connecticut, his home for most of his life, with his wife, Ina.

== Photography ==
As Library Journal said in 2006, "Trager has spent more than 40 years making photographs that transform our physical world into moments of clarity and brightness unique to the medium." Initially, his images' subjects centered on buildings and their settings, but less from the viewpoint of architect or engineer than from what Peter Schjeldahl has termed "place portraiture."

In 1987, Trager published Villas of Palladio (New York Graphic Society), about which Schjeldahl wrote that, “the place-portraiture of Philip Trager’s Palladian villas [is] . . . as beautiful, it seems to me, as any photographs I have ever seen.” By the time this book was released, however, Trager was already devoting himself to making images of modern dancers in motion. His book Dancers was published in 1992.

Trager does not use stop-action strobes, a photographic device popular with many dance photographers; instead, his images of dancers such as Mark Morris, Eiko & Koma, David Parsons, and Bill T. Jones (among many others), show them soaring through space or sagging heavily to the ground. Trager made almost all of these dance images outdoors in natural light. In the LA Times, Donna Perlmutter said that, "this collection of startling black-and-white museum pieces, using lush alfresco settings. . . besieges the eye with its bold sense of mystery, contradiction and surprise." Returning to architecture in the mid-1990s, Trager began work on a collection of photographs of the built environment bordering the Seine in Paris.

From the start, Trager has used large-format view cameras (particularly 4 x 5 and 5 x 7, occasionally 11 x 14) for his images of architecture. During a 2005 interview with Stephanie Wiles, then director of the Allen Memorial Art Museum at Oberlin College, Trager said, “I happen to be a Type-A personality and quick by nature, and with the view camera somehow you have to slow down. The dance photographs, of course, were totally different.”

Trager personally prints all his gelatin silver prints, and relies on a master photographic-printmaker for the palladium and platinum prints often seen in exhibitions. As Jeremy Adamson, chief of the Prints and Photographs Division of the Library of Congress, wrote: “[Trager’s] keen eye for expressive form and shape, his emotional sensitivity to the effects of light and atmosphere, his intellectual appreciation of the dynamics of structures, both architectural and human, and his command of the temporal moment have resulted in extraordinarily evocative compositions.”

== Monographs ==
Although Trager's photographs have been reproduced in many publications dealing with the art of photography, architecture, and dance, he is best known for the meticulously prepared and produced monographs of his black-and-white photographs. Many of his early architectural images were collected in two such monographs: Photographs of Architecture (1977) and Philip Trager: New York (1988), and in the introduction to the latter art historian Samuel M. Green II situated Trager's visual acuity, saying, “the success of these photographs…derives from the penetration of [Trager’s] vision, his ability to state the quintessential.”

His next publication, The Villas of Palladio (1987), was widely and favorably reviewed. For example, in Progressive Architecture, John DiGregorio wrote: “With this volume Trager has done something extraordinary—he has managed to transcend the boundary between the use of the photographic image as visual documentation and its use as a vehicle for artistic expression.”

Changing Paris: A Tour along the Seine (2000), Trager's eighth monograph, was the last to be published by a United States-based publisher. The German publisher Steidl released Faces in 2005 and Philip Trager, the catalogue to a major traveling retrospective exhibition of his work, the following year. The same house is publishing New York in the 1970s (2015), which draws on negatives recently rediscovered by the photographer. In 2016, Steidl will release Photographing Ina.

== Bibliography of monographs ==
- Photographing Ina. Foreword by Andrew Szegedy-Maszak. Göttingen, Germany: Steidl, [forthcoming 2016].
- New York in the 1970s. Foreword by Stephen C. Pinson. Göttingen, Germany: Steidl, 2015.
- Philip Trager [retrospective]. Essays by Barbara L. Michaels, Norton Owen, Andrew Szegedy-Maszak, and John Wood; interview by Stephanie Wiles. Göttingen, Germany: Steidl, 2006.
- Faces. Göttingen, Germany: Steidl, 2005.
- Changing Paris: A Tour along the Seine. Architectural commentary by Thomas Mellins; foreword by Pierre Borhan; introduction by Diane Johnson. Santa Fe, NM: Arena Editions, 2000.
- Persephone. Poems by Eavan Boland and Rita Dove; text by Ralph Lemon and Andrew Szegedy-Maszak. Middletown, CT: Wesleyan University Press, with New England Foundation for the Arts, 1996.
- Dancers. Foreword by Bill T. Jones; essays by Joan Acocella and David Freedberg; afterword by Mark Morris. Boston: Bulfinch Press, 1992.
- The Villas of Palladio. Text by Vincent Scully; foreword by Renato Cevese; introduction by Michael Graves. Boston: New York Graphic Society, 1986.
- Wesleyan Photographs. Foreword by Paul Horgan; text by Vincent Scully, Eve Blau, and Samuel M. Green II. Middletown, CT: Wesleyan University Press, 1982.
- Philip Trager: New York. Foreword by Louis Auchincloss. Middletown, CT: Wesleyan University Press, 1980.
- Photographs of Architecture. Introduction by Samuel M. Green II. Middletown, CT: Wesleyan University Press, 1977.
- Echoes of Silence. Danbury, CT: Scroll Press, 1972.

== Museum and library collections ==
The definitive collection of Trager's photographs is owned by the Library of Congress, Washington, DC). A partial list of other North American collections with holdings of his photographs include:

- Allen Memorial Art Museum, Oberlin College (Oberlin, OH)
- The Art Gallery, University of Maryland (Baltimore)
- Baltimore Museum of Art
- Birmingham Museum of Art
- Canadian Centre for Architecture (Montréal, Québec)
- Center for Creative Photography (Tucson, AZ)
- Contemporary Art Galleries, University of Connecticut (Storrs)
- Davison Art Center, Wesleyan University (Middletown, CT)
- George Eastman House International Museum of Photography (Rochester, NY)
- Metropolitan Museum of Art (New York)
- Museum of the City of New York
- Museum of Modern Art (New York)
- National Building Museum (Washington, DC)
- National Gallery of Art, Corcoran Collection (Washington D.C.)
- National Museum of American History (Smithsonian Institution; Washington, DC)
- New York Public Library
- Philadelphia Museum of Art
- Phillips Collection (Washington, DC)
- Smith College Museum of Art (Northampton, MA)
- Yale University Art Gallery (New Haven, CT)

In Europe, Trager's photographs are in the collections of:

- Bibliothèque Nationale (Paris)
- Galeries Fnac (Paris)
- Musée Carnavalet (Paris)
- Musée de l’Elysée Lausanne (Switzerland)
