= Mischief Brew =

Philadelphia, Pennsylvania folk punk band (2000-2016)

- Also known as: Kettle Rebellion (2001–02)
- Origin: Philadelphia, Pennsylvania, U.S.
- Genres: Folk punk; anarcho-punk
- Years active: 2000–2016
- Labels: Fistolo Records; Alternative Tentacles; Gunner Records; Art Of The Underground
- Past members: Erik Petersen; Shawn St. Clair; Christopher Petersen; Christopher "Doc" Kulp; Sean "Shantz" Yantz
- Website: www.mischiefbrew.com

Mischief Brew was an American folk punk band from Philadelphia consisting of vocalist and guitarist Erik Petersen, bassist Shawn St. Clair, and drummers Christopher Petersen and Christopher Kulp. The band played DIY folk punk and anarcho-punk music; it incorporated styles including American folk, Celtic folk, Gypsy-punk, and swing with lyrics influenced by the labour movement, protest music, and punk culture.

Mischief Brew started by Erik Petersen as a solo project, but eventually grew into a band. Petersen drew inspiration from the protest movements of the 1960s, "the idea that rebellion in music didn't originate in punk rock" (Profane Existence No. 54, 2007), and anti-establishment artists like Woody Guthrie and Crass. Petersen's lyrics often pay homage to American labor radicalism of the early 20th century.

Mischief Brew released albums and EPs on many different labels, notably Art of the Underground, Gunner Records, and Fistolo Records. In support of these records, Mischief Brew toured extensively throughout the United States as well as Europe. When playing live, they performed with four to five people, incorporating such instruments as junk/found percussion, trumpet, accordion, violin, mandolin, and vibraphone into their set.

== History ==
Mischief Brew started after Erik Petersen's previous band, The Orphans, broke up in 2000. The Orphans were a punk band formed in West Chester, Pennsylvania in 1995 consisting of Erik Petersen on vocals and guitar, Andrew (Drew) Petersen on vocals and bass, Tom Johnson on guitar, and Andrew Baxter on drums. The group would go on to perform reunion shows in 2004 and 2008.

At first, Mischief Brew consisted of only Petersen on an acoustic guitar or mandolin, playing songs off of the Mirth demo. In 2003, Petersen released the Bellingham & Philadelphia split with Robert Blake, and the Bakenal CDEP. After extensive acoustic touring in support of the first two releases, Petersen assembled the first full-band incarnation of Mischief Brew, featuring Chris "Doc" Kulp (of Red Devil) on drums and Sean "Shantz" Yantz (of Evil Robot Us' and Abusing the Word) on bass. In 2005, Petersen released his first full-length, Smash The Windows, featuring guest spots by artists from Leftöver Crack, World/Inferno Friendship Society, and Guignol. This release saw him experiment more musically, with styles ranging from gypsy-folk to swing.

The second album was Songs From Under the Sink, a collection of songs written between 1997 and 2002 which stresses his anarchist beliefs and is complemented by his clever guitar melodies. Yantz left the band shortly after Songs from Under the Sink was released, and was replaced for a few shows by Kevin Holland and later by Shawn St. Clair (of Endless Nightmare, Lost Cause, Stations, the Bad Dudes and Wrought With Sickness), who played bass. Mischief Brew's released Photographs from the Shoebox in 2008, a split LP/CD with Joe Jack Talcum of The Dead Milkmen.

In 2009, two versions of the song "Punx Win!" appeared on a split with Andrew Jackson Jihad. Rather than a traditional 7-inch single, Pirates Press Records released the record as an 8" with parallel grooves, therefore able to play either version of the track depending on where the needle is dropped. Petersen and Guignol collaborated in 2009 on Fight Dirty. Mischief Brew released The Stone Operation in May 2011. The previous year, on October 18, 2010, an unmastered track from the album, "Dallas In Romania," was previewed by Y-Rock on WXPN.

Leading up to and following the release of This Is Not For Children, Mischief Brew released three music videos for their songs "O, Pennsyltucky!" (Fistolo, 2014), "City of Black Fridays" (Shibby Pictures, 2015), and "Squatter Envy" (Shibby Pictures, 2016), all three of which appeared on the album.

Mischief Brew played shows in support of Food Not Bombs, Iraq Veterans Against the War, and ABC No Rio. In October 2011, Petersen played an acoustic set at Occupy Philadelphia.

Founding member and vocalist Erik Petersen died on July 14, 2016. Three days later, a tribute to Petersen was held on WXPN radio’s The Folk Show.

== Band members ==
Mischief Brew members

At the time of Erik Petersen's death in 2016, Mischief Brew consisted of three members—brothers Erik and Chris Petersen and Shawn St. Clair.

- Erik Petersen – vocals, guitar, mandolin (2000–2016; deceased)
- Shawn St. Clair – bass (2006–2016)
- Christopher Petersen – drums, percussion (2008–2016)
- Christopher "Doc" Kulp – drums, percussion, guitar (2003–2008)
- Sean Yantz – bass (2003–2006)

Original bassist Sean Yantz was briefly replaced by Kevin Holland (for a few shows) and later Shawn St. Clair, who remained with the band until its end. As well, original drummer Christopher "Doc" Kulp, who had played with Erik since Kettle Rebellion and was replaced by Erik's brother Chris, continued to make guest appearances with the band following his departure. Along with these members, the band regularly featured other musicians such as Franz Nicolay and Tom Swafford, as well as other guests and early members.

Kettle Rebellion members

Kettle Rebellion was the first "full-band" group that later became Mischief Brew. The group was formed in 2001 following the Mirth demo, and they recorded eight songs in 2002, which were later discovered and released on an eponymous EP in 2014.

- Erik Petersen – vocals, guitar, mandolin
- Jon Foy – bass, backing vocals
- Christopher "Doc" Kulp – drums, percussion, backing vocals, bugle

=== Timeline ===
Mischief Brew (2000-2016) and Kettle Rebellion (2001-2002)

== Discography ==
=== Studio albums ===
- Bellingham & Philadelphia (Art of the Underground, 2003) – split with Robert Blake; as Erik Petersen
- Smash The Windows (Fistolo/Gunner, 2005)
- Songs From Under The Sink (Fistolo, 2006) – reissued 2016
- Photographs From The Shoebox (Fistolo, 2008) – split with Joe Jack Talcum; reissued 2014
- Fight Dirty (Fistolo, 2009) – collaboration with Guignol
- The Stone Operation (Fistolo, 2011)
- This Is Not For Children (Alternative Tentacles, 2015)
- Bacchanal 'N' Philadelphia (Fistolo, 2016)

=== Extended plays and 7-inches ===
Mischief Brew regularly released extended plays and 7-inches throughout their time as a band, many of which were split with other bands. The Under The Table 7-inch was originally part of Suburban Home Records' Under The Influence series. The Kettle Rebellion EP was a long-lost EP with studio songs from Mirth; the master tape was stolen from Petersen's house and leaked online with incorrect song titles, but the EP was properly released.

- Bakenal EP (Fistolo, 2003)
- Oh Sweet Misery 7-inch (Art of the Underground, 2005)
- Two Boxcars 7-inch (Fistolo, 2005) – split with David Dondero
- Loved, But Unrespected 7-inch (Fistolo, 2006) – split with Bread and Roses
- Jobs in Steeltown 7-inch (Fistolo, 2008)
- Partners In Crime No. 2 7-inch (Fistolo/Crafty, 2009) – split with Guitar Bomb, Wingnut Dishwashers Union, Endless Mike and the Beagle Club
- Punx Win! 8" (Pirates Press, 2009) – split with AJJ
- Rhapsody For Knives 7-inch EP (Fistolo, 2012)
- Free Radical Radio Fever 7-inch (Gunner, 2013)
- Under The Table 7-inch (Silver Sprocket Bicycle Club, 2013) – split with Franz Nicolay
- Kettle Rebellion EP (Fistolo/Different Circle, 2014)

=== Demos/cassettes ===
- Mirth, or Certain Verses Composed and Fitted to Tunes, for the Delight and Recreation of All (Fistolo, 2000)
- Live on WKDU 91.7 FM (Fistolo, 2001)
- Live in Ray's Basement (Square of Opposition, 2002) – split with Robert Blake
- Don't Spoil Yer Supper! (Fistolo, 2003)
- Boiling Breakfast Early (Dead Format, 2008) – a collection of early demos
- Fight Dirty (The Cottage Records, 2009) – collaboration with Guignol
- Thanks, Bastards! (Fistolo, 2014) – collection of unreleased demos, Bandcamp only
- O, Pennsyltucky! (Fistolo, 2014) – cassette single, later released on This is Not For Children

=== Compilation appearances ===
- Where the Wild Things Rock - Philly Punk Comp. (song: "Weapons")
- This is War! - Comp. & Double Zine (song: "Liberty Unmasked (radio performance)")
- Artists Fight the System - Pacifica Radio Double Disc (song: "Every Town Will Celebrate")
- Art of the Underground Sampler CD - Art of the Underground (song: "Boycott Me!")
- Beyond the Ballot (song: "The Lowly Carpenter (radio performance)")
- Up the Stairs and Through the Hall - Sherman Arts Comp. (song: "Departure Arrival")
- Rising Tide - Riotfolk (song: "Save a City...")
- A Wrench in the Works: Radical Library Benefit CD - (song: "The Lowly Carpenter (radio performance)")
- Never Forgotten, Never Forgiven - Profane Existence Records (song: "A Liquor Never Brewed")
- 0 to 60 in 59 Bands - No!No Records (song: "Ode to a Safecracker")
- Profane Existence No. 54 - Sampler and interview with Mischief Brew (song: "Tell Me A Story")
- The State I'm In - Crafty Records (song: "A Peasant's Rebellion")
- Mancubbers - Mancub Tribute compilation (song: "An Open Letter to the North American Continent")
- Still Kicking - Kebele Benefit Comp. (song: "All About the Class War")
- And You Call This Civilization? - Pumpkin Records (song: "The Riverflow")
- A Benefit For Anthony Poynter - Get Better Records (song: "The Midnight Special 2002 (Country Mile Version)")
- Too Punk To Folk - Dying Scene (song: "Catch Fire")
- A Tribute To Rudimentary Peni - Pumpkin Records (song: "Drinking Song From The Tomb")
- WKDU Live!!!! Volume One: Resurrect Music On Planet Earth - WKDU (song: "Liberty Unmasked (radio performance)")
- The Songs Of Neutral Milk Hotel: A Tribute - Fringe Sound/Swamp Cabbage Records (song: "The Fool")
- My Org Cassette Mixtape - Punknews (song: "Progress," Flux Of Pink Indians cover)
- Punks Vs. Pigs - LATFO Records (song: "Working Class Pride," 2.5 Children Inc. cover)
- ''Art of the Underground Single Series: Year 1'' 7-inch (Art of the Underground, 2005)

=== Soundtrack/film appearances ===
- Con Artist - 2009 (song: "Fight Dirty")
- Deadpool 2 (song: "Fight Dirty") (Deadpool 2 Plus Super Duper Cut only)
- The Farmer And The Horse - 2010 (song: "Olde Tyme Mem'ry")

=== Bootlegs/unofficial releases ===
- Live At Punx Picnic Baltimore (Acoustic set recorded in 2004, mix of originals and covers by The Pogues, Doom, Culture Shock, and Chumbawamba)
- Live At Coyle Street Collective Apartment (Acoustic set recorded on April 24, 2005, in Portland, Maine)
- Live At The Bike Barn (Live set recorded on August 2, 2005, in Falmouth, Maine)

== See also ==
- List of songs by Mischief Brew
