= Leslie Patricelli =

American writer

Leslie Patricelli is the American writer and illustrator of many bestselling books for babies, elementary school children and tweens. Her books include the internationally recognized titles "Potty" and "Toot!". She is also the writer and illustrator of the much-loved "Rizzlerunk Club Series", including "Best Buds Under Frogs" and "The Big Bad Lies". Her picture books include, the Boston Horn Honor book, "Higher! Higher!", "Faster! Faster!", "Bigger! Bigger!", "Be Quiet, Mike!" and "The Patterson Puppies" series. She illustrated the acclaimed Mini Myth series, as well.

Leslie Patricelli grew up in Issaquah, Washington close to Pine Lake. At college, Leslie Patricelli majored in communications at the University of Washington. She then became an advertising copywriter and illustrator. She worked as a contractor at Microsoft for seven years, where she created and animated many help characters, including Scuzz the Rat for Microsoft Bob, Power Pup for Office '97, and animated Rover the Dog for Windows XP. Patricelli took classes at the School of Visual Concepts in Seattle. She is married to drummer, Jason Vontver. She has three kids who are the basis for the little baby in many of her books.

== Books ==
- Big Little
- Yummy Yucky
- Quiet Loud
- Binky (British title: Dummy)
- Blankie
- The Birthday Box
- No No Yes Yes
- Baby Happy Baby Sad
- Higher! Higher!
- The Patterson Puppies and the Rainy Day
- The Patterson Puppies and the Midnight Monster
- Tubby (British title: In the Bath)
- Potty (British title: On My Potty)
- Be Quiet, Mike!
- Faster! Faster!
- Fa La La
- Huggy Kissy
- Toot
- Tickle
- Hop! Hop!
- Boo!
- Hair
- Nighty-night
- The Rizzlerunk Club: Best Buds Under Frogs
- The Rizzlerunk Club: The Big Bad Lies
- Bigger! Bigger!
- Big Kid Bed
- Tooth
- Mad, Mad, MAD
- Doggie Gets Scared
- Mommy (British title: Mummy)
- Daddy
- Splash!
- Snow
