= Wayne Sides =

American photographer

- Born: 1948 (age 77–78); Anniston, Alabama, U.S.
- Education: New College: University of Alabama, Pratt Institute
- Known for: Photography, mixed media art

Wayne Sides is an American photographer, artist and educator that is best known for his documentary and conceptual art categories of photography and mixed-media art.

== Early life and education ==
Sides was born in Anniston, Alabama, bordering the community of Saks, Alabama, both located in Calhoun County. His discovery of old family photographs at his grandmothers house had an early influence on him to document the architecture of abandoned buildings and the ever changing landscapes he saw depicted in those images and the region.

Sides attended the Harry M. Ayres Technical College (now part of Gadsden State as Ayers Campus) and graduated with a degree in optical mechanics. In order to pursue his interest in the arts, he then attended Jacksonville State University, where he studied painting, sculpture, theater and dance choreography. Sides began using the camera as a tool to document his sculptures and ultimately found the photographs he took of the assembled elements, just as interesting as the sculptures themselves.

He later transferred to the University of Alabama for their New College program (now part of the College of Arts and Sciences), where he focused on both art photography under teacher and mentor Gay Burke, as well as performance art. Sides also continued with theater and began dance studies under teacher Lula "Lou" Wall and performed as part of a traveling performance group, The University Dancers. After graduating from the University of Alabama’s New College with a degree in Visual and Performing Arts in 1975, Sides would later move to New York City in 1981 to attend Pratt Institute, where he obtained his MFA in photography.

== Career and Community Arts Programs ==
After graduating from the University of Alabama’s New College in 1975, Sides worked on photography based projects and exhibits while being involved in the early development of art based educational programs in under-resourced communities and schools in Alabama as an artist in residence.

In 1976, Sides relocated to Oneonta, Alabama, in Blount County, a region considered the foothills of the Appalachian Mountains known for its history of coal and iron mining. He became a resident artist and resource person for one year there, under the National Endowment for the Arts (NEA), through the Alabama State Council on the Arts and Humanities, ‘Alabama Artist: In The Schools Program’, the first such program of its kind in Blount County, Alabama.

Sides then moved to Decatur, Alabama, for a two-year artist-in-residency program associated with the city school system for the development of an arts' influenced learning program, including photography and theater. The program was further established under the federal Emergency School Aid Act (ESAA). The ESSA was first proposed in 1970 by President Nixon and proceeded as ‘Education Amendments of 1972’, then enacted by congress in 1975. The establishment of the initiative was part of the social justice movements' related legislation of the previous decade, with the continuation of advancing desegregation and offering diversity through innovative techniques for under-resourced districts to overcome educational disadvantages for better educational access and effectiveness. In his role, Sides managed and developed out a program that brought in poets, painters, folk artists, musicians and related resources from other regions to the area, as part of the overall creative education program. His work included developing student and adult theater, and being a consultant to the Alabama State Council on the Arts and a member of the mayor's council for the cultural arts center in Decatur, Alabama. Sides also lectured to civic and cultural organizations, while providing workshops with an emphasis on theater and photography at various locations throughout Alabama from 1975 to 1980.

In 1979 his first book of photographs titled ‘Sideshow’ was published and in 1981 he moved to New York City (NYC) for his graduate studies while continuing to work in community arts programs. The programs he worked for provided mentorship in the arts and further educational support for schools and those of the community, in association with the New York Foundation for the Arts. While taking time off from personal projects, he did other part time assignments as a public education “Artreach Lecturer”, for the Whitney Museum of American Art and also worked with the New York City and Brooklyn Parks Commission by photographically documenting the nature imagery found in architectural details of Prospect Park and the surrounding community that was created by 19th and 20th century stone carvers, artisans and craftsmen.

Sides became a visiting professor of photography in the Department of Art at the University of Alabama. Shortly afterwards while living in Europe, Gay Burke sent word to him about a job opening at the University of North Alabama. In 1988 he was appointed professor of photography and art, at the University of North Alabama and taught there until 2015.

== Work ==
Some of his best known work includes his earlier documentary photographic work of the Ku Klux Klan (KKK) and his later work and exhibition titled “Human Traces / L’esser Umano Traccia” (2010), a mixture of photo collage that deals with various aspects of human migration commonalities and prejudices faced by a minority race or ethnic group communities.

In 1976 while at the Birmingham, Alabama state fair, he happened upon a booth set up by a Klan chapter. He had heard of the Klan while growing up but thought they had faded away, so to see a resurgent and very visible faction on public display at a state fair was surprising. Sides became interested in learning why they were dedicated to something as radical and extreme as what they represented and the reasons they still existed.

As social unrest related to the Klan’s increased activities flared up in the region, Sides began to document Klan activities and rallies, as well as the growing counter protest movement in more depth. The same region that several decades prior had witnessed a miscarriage of justice with the retrials of the Scottsboro Boys in the 1930s, was experiencing new conflicts from the Klan that coincided with the Tommy Lee Hines case and the many related counter protests that took place in Decatur, Alabama.

In 1978 and 1979, Civil Rights activists and Ku Klux Klan members battled in Decatur, Alabama over the case of Tommy Lee Hines, a mentally disabled black man with the IQ of a six-year old who was convicted by an all-white jury of raping a white woman, after initially being accused of two more rapes and a robbery. In the unrest that followed, Southern Christian Leadership Conference (SCLC) civil rights activists protested at the Decatur City Hall and Louisiana native Bill Wilkinson (Imperial Wizard of the "Invisible Empire, Knights of the Ku Klux Klan", from 1975 to 1981) came to the area to form several large and active Klan dens or (Klaverns). This led to intimidation and violence, including a shootout near City Hall between civil rights activists and Klansmen that left four wounded.

After documenting events and protests for some time, Sides saw there was a story developing within his photographs. However, since he had taken the photographs on his own rather than as a hired photojournalist, which was more common, he wasn’t exactly sure what to do with the accumulated photographs he took. At the least he wanted to show others what had occurred and the realities of what he documented, so he decided take a few of his documentary photographs with him while on a visit to New York City. There he was able to meet with Ivan Karp of the OK Harris Gallery and showed him a sample collection of his work. The raw and uncomfortably close look at the Klan provided by the work, prompted Karp to tentatively offer Sides a show at the gallery. He recommend Sides to continue pursuing the project and told him he wanted to see more when the work was developed further. Encouraged by this meeting, Sides continued to work towards documenting more.

From his first encounter with the Klan to documenting various counter protests, had spanned a four-year period. Some time after moving to NYC for graduate school, he eventually reconnected with Ivan Karp of the OK Harris Gallery to follow up based on the previous discussion they had a few years prior. In 1984, to coincide with the OK Harris show, Sides had a book made containing a collection of 24 photographs that was designed by Marvin Hoshino, with the historical context and introduction written by Guy Martin.

In 2002, a selection of Sides documentary Klan photographs including previously unseen work, was presented as ”Images of The Klan”, and featured as part of an exhibition that visually chronicled the 1960s–1970s history of the civil rights struggle in America and was held at the Birmingham Civil Rights Institute, in Birmingham Alabama for its 10-year anniversary. The exhibition presented a full and accurate view of the extremism that was present during the early civil right’s movement and that which continued through to the 70s. While some thought it controversial for images of the Klan to be shown at the Birmingham Civil Rights Institute, the person who was director at the time, thought they were a very historic and important group of photographs that needed to be shown in public and that the institute was a good place for them to be a document of the past struggle and prejudices faced.

== Exhibitions ==
=== Solo exhibitions (selection) ===
- 1980: Wayne Sides: Ten Years of Photographs, Nassau Vision Gallery, Atlanta, GA
- 1981: Photographs from the South, 4th Street Photo Gallery, New York City
- 1984: KKK by Wayne Sides, O.K. Harris, New York City
- 1989: Wayne Sides: Thirty Hand-colored Photographs, Maralyn Wilson Gallery, Birmingham, AL
- 1990–1992: Litany for a Vanishing Landscape, Exhibit. (multiple locations)
  - Kennedy-Douglass Center for the Arts, Florence, AL, 1990
  - Birmingham Art Association, Birmingham, AL, 1991
  - Alabama Artists Gallery, Montgomery, AL, 1992
- 1991: The KKK: Photographs by Wayne Sides, Cheekwood Fine Arts Center, Nashville, TN
- 1992: Waynes Sides, 20 Years of Photographs, Hammond Hall Gallery, Jacksonville State University, Jacksonville, AL
- 1997: Secrets of a Small World, The Center for Cultural Arts, Gadsden, AL
- 2000: From the Vegas Strip to the West and Beyond, Public Relations Gallery, Florence, AL
- 2002: Images of The Klan, Birmingham Civil Rights Institute, Birmingham, AL
- 2005: The Chains Have Changed, Lori Davis Gallery, Florence, AL (Part of the “Voting Rights Commemoration Series”, hosted by the Shoals Inter-Faith Council. The events were held at several locations, beginning with venues located at The University of North Alabama. A multimedia presentation showcasing work by Sides and photographer Charles Moore took place at the Florence-Lauderdale Public Library. As part of the series, a show of Sides work was also exhibited at the Lori Davis Gallery, where he and photographer Charles Moore both discussed their work.)
- 2007: Through My Eyes, Wayne Sides: Photography 1977–2007 / Retrospective, Shaw Center for the Arts, Louisiana State University, Baton Rouge, LA
- 2009: Wayne Sides: 30 years of the Image / Retrospective, (Seventy works and two exhibit locations)
  - Tennessee Valley Museum of Art, Tuscumbia, AL, 2009
  - Bama Theater Gallery, Tuscaloosa, AL, 2009
- 2010–2013: Human Traces / L’esser Umano Traccia. (multiple locations)
  - Palazzo Panichi, Pietrasanta, Italy, 2010
  - Montgomery Museum of Art, Montgomery, AL, 2011
  - Tennessee Valley Museum of Art, Tuscumbia, AL, 2013
- 2018: I Wake From a Dream, Helen Keller Library, Tuscumbia, AL (Photography and assemblage collage)
- 2019: The Boy Who Fell to Earth, Thomas University, Thomasville, GA (mixed-media assemblages)

=== Group exhibitions (selection) ===
- 1972: Northeast Alabama Photography Exhibition, Sokol Gallery - Jewish Community Center, Birmingham, AL
- 1972: Centennial Painting Exhibition: Precious Scruff, Birmingham Museum of Art, Birmingham, AL (mixed media painting on polyester resin)
- 1978: Triptych, Images Photo Gallery, New Orleans, LA
- 1979: Light Fantastic, Kresge Art Gallery, Michigan State University, East Lansing, MI
- 1989: In View of Home: Alabama Landscapes. Curated by Frances Robb. The exhibit traveled to four Alabama cities in conjunction with the Alabama Reunion.
  - Huntsville Museum of Art, Huntsville, AL
  - Montgomery Museum of Fine Art, Montgomery, AL
  - Anniston Museum of Natural History, Anniston, AL
  - Fine Arts Museum of the South, Mobile AL
- 1989: Dianas, Brownies, and Pinholes, Sarratt Gallery, Vanderbilt University, Nashville, TN
- 1993: Box Show, Maralyn Wilson Gallery, Birmingham, AL
- 2004: Inspiration/Transformation: Ma’Cille’s Exhibit, Sarah Moody Gallery of Art, Garland Hall, University of Alabama, Tuscaloosa, AL
- 2012: Art of the State, Photography and mixed media category. The exhibit traveled to three Alabama cities.
  - Tennessee Valley Museum of Art, Tuscumbia, AL
  - Johnson Center for the Arts, Troy, AL
  - Hardin Center, Gadsden, AL
- 2018–19: Butterfly Effect / Honoring the legacy of Gay Burke, Tuscaloosa, AL
  - Dinah Washington Cultural Arts Center, Tuscaloosa, AL, 2018
  - Georgine Clarke Alabama Artists Gallery, Alabama State Council on the Arts, Montgomery, AL, 2019

== Publications ==
=== Books ===
- Sideshow. Atlanta: Thunder House Press, 1979. ASIN B004BN5C0U.
- Images of the KKK: Wayne Sides. Atlanta: Thunder House Press, 1984. ASIN B000VM6LU0.

=== Contributions to publications (selection) ===
- The Black Warrior Review. Tuscaloosa, AL: Black Warrior Review, Fall 1975. Cover photograph by Sides.
- Violence: The Ku Klux Klan And The Struggle For Equality. Connecticut Education Association, 1981. ISBN 978-0930040383. Cover photo credits: Top row: left, Freda Leinwand; center, Danny Lyon; right, National Archives; Bottom row: left, Wayne Sides; right, Ed Cohen.
- Racist America. Fall 1984. Produced for New York City art exhibition entitled "Racist America” curated by Robert Costa. Included drawings, collages, photographs, paintings, poetry and articles. Contributors: Amiri Baraka, Jimmie Durham, Fay Chiang, Wayne Sides and Rachael Romero. Edited by Willoughby Sharp, Julius Valiunas; Michigan State University Archive.
- Eye Magazine. 1985. Collaborative portfolio permanent collection, Museum of Modern Art.
- Untitled Magazine. Brooklyn, New York: Issues; Spring 1988, Fall 1988, Winter 1989, Spring 1990. Photography by Sides and others with featured poetry and illustrations.
- Litany for a Vanishing Landscape. 1990. ASIN B079Y9ZRCY. Photography by Sides. Poetry and essay by Jeanie Thompson
- The Black Warrior Review. Tuscaloosa, AL: Black Warrior Review, Spring/Summer 1991. We Must Trust In Shadows, art contribution by Sides.
- Revelations: Alabama's Visionary Folk Artists. Birmingham, AL: Crane Hill Publishers, 1994. ISBN 978-1881548072. By Kathy Kemp, photo contribution by Sides and others.
- The Ballad of Little River: A Tale of Race and Unrest in the Rural South. 2001. Tuscaloosa, AL: University of Alabama Press, 2001. ISBN 978-0817311100. By Paul Hemphill. Cover photograph by Sides.
- Gather Up Our Voices. Montgomery, AL: The Alabama Writers’ Forum, 2008. ASIN B007AZWO0W. Photography by Sides, hand-colored black and white photographs. Introduction and editing by Jeanie Thompson. This anthology features selected writings from recipients of the Harper Lee Award for Alabama's Distinguished Writer: 1998–2007.
- The Seasons Bear Us. Montgomery, AL: River City Publishers, 2009. ISBN 978-1579660864. By Jeanie Thompson. Cover photograph by Sides.
- The Myth of Water: Poems from the Life of Helen Keller. Tuscaloosa, AL: University Alabama Press, 2016. ASIN B01K4NX3EW, ISBN 0817358579. Essay and poetry by Jeanie Thompson. Cover photograph by Sides.
