= Mary Gregg Byrne =

American artist

- Born: 1951 (age 74–75); Oberlin, Ohio
- Education: University of Oregon; School of Visual Concepts
- Known for: Portraits, illustration, landscapes
- Awards: 1997 Juror's Award for Painting, Tacoma Art Museum Northwest Biennial; 2003 Benjamin Franklin Award for illustration, One Smile

Mary Gregg Byrne (born 1951 in Oberlin, Ohio) is an American portraitist, Illustrator, and landscape artist, who is best known for her watercolor paintings.

== Biography ==
Byrne was born in 1951, in Oberlin, Ohio and grew up in the Midwest. Byrne's grandmother was an artist, and Byrne started painting when she was a child, being encouraged by her mother.

Byrne went to Occidental College, intending to become a biologist. But she later changed her mind and attended University of Oregon, where she earned a Bachelor of Fine Arts in printmaking in 1975. After graduating from university, Byrne worked as a scrimshaw and advertising designer at Alaskan Silver & Ivory Company for a few years until 1980. After that, she began painting watercolors. In 1995, she attended School of Visual Concepts.

In 1975, Byrne moved to Bellingham, Washington, where she currently lives.

== Career as an illustrator ==
Byrne's works have been exhibited in many places in the United States. Byrne is a member of the Society of Children's Book Writers and Illustrators, National Watercolor Society and the Northwest Watercolor Society, and she has had her works shown in traveling exhibition of Northwest Watercolor Society.

In 1997, Byrne received the Juror's Award for Painting at Tacoma Art Museum Northwest Biennial. In 2003, Byrne won a Benjamin Franklin Award for her illustrating work on the 2002 children book One Smile.

== Works ==
=== Illustrator ===
- Rachel Wolf, Splash 5: The Glory of Color 1998.
- Rachel Wolf, Best of Flower Painting, Volume 2 1999.
- Rachel Wolf, Splash 6: The Best of Watercolor 2000.
- Cindy McKinley, One Smile 2002.
- Heidi Charissa Schmidt, Too Many Murkles 2003.
