= Graham Boettcher =

Art historian and museum director

Graham Corray Boettcher (born March 2, 1973) is an American art curator who is the director of the Birmingham Museum of Art in Birmingham, Alabama.

== Early life and education ==
Boettcher was born in Bellingham, Washington on March 2, 1973. He completed his Bachelor of Arts in German Studies at Yale University in 1995. After completing a fellowship at the Amon Carter Museum in Fort Worth, Texas in 1998, he earned a Master of Arts in Art History at the University of Washington in 1999. He participated in a Terra Foundation Summer Residency in Giverny, France in 2001, then returned to Yale for his Ph.D. in the History of Art, which he completed, following a term as a curatorial fellow at the Yale University Art Gallery, in 2006.

== Career ==
Boettcher came to the Birmingham Museum of Art in 2006 as a Luce Foundation Curatorial Fellow of American Art. He was named curator of American Art at the museum in 2008. After completing a fellowship at the Center for Curatorial Leadership in 2014 he was promoted to chief curator, then to deputy director in 2016, before succeeding Gail Trechsel as the 7th director of the museum in 2017. Boettcher has also served as a trustee and officer of the Association of Art Museum Curators.

== Publications ==
- Boettcher, Graham C. (2012) The Look of Love: Eye Miniatures from the Skier Collection. Birmingham: Birmingham Museum of Art & London: D. Giles Ltd., ISBN 9781907804014
- Boettcher, Graham C. (2015) "The Artist's Queen: John Trumbull's 'Sarah Trumbull on Her Deathbed'." Pursuing the American Vision. Yale University Art Gallery Bulletin, pp. 35–43
