= Birmingham Museum of Art =

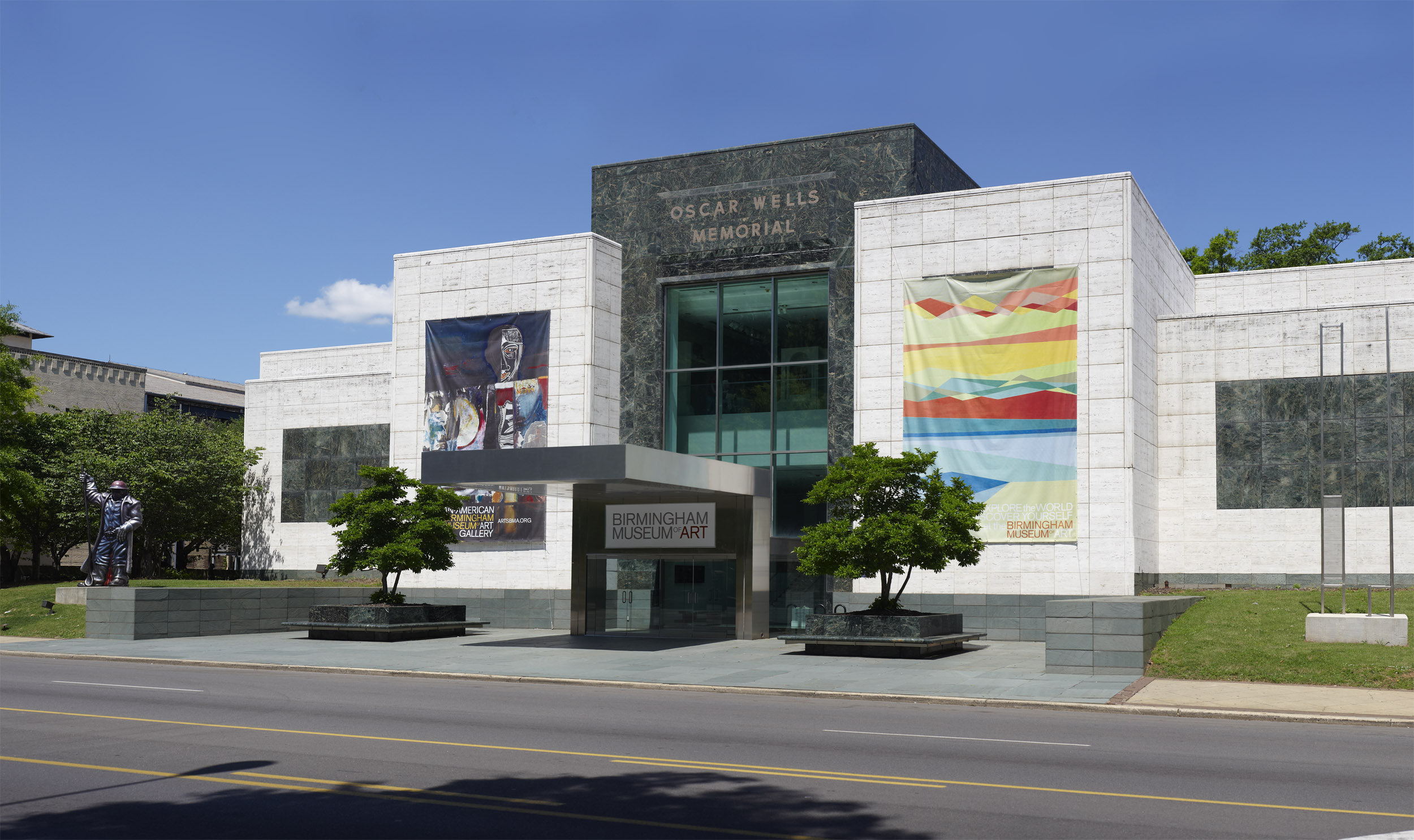
- Oscar Wells Memorial entrance to the museum
- Interactive fullscreen map
- Established: April 1951
- Location: 2000 Rev. Abraham Woods Jr. Blvd. North (formerly 8th Avenue North); Birmingham, Alabama, US
- Coordinates: 33°31′20″N 86°48′36″W
- Type: Municipal art museum
- Director: Graham Boettcher
- Website: www.artsbma.org

The Birmingham Museum of Art is a museum in Birmingham, Alabama. Its collection includes more than 24,000 paintings, sculptures, prints, drawings, and decorative arts representing various cultures, including Asian, European, American, African, Pre-Columbian, and Native American. The museum is also home to some Renaissance and Baroque paintings, sculptures, and decorative arts from the late 13th century to c. 1750.

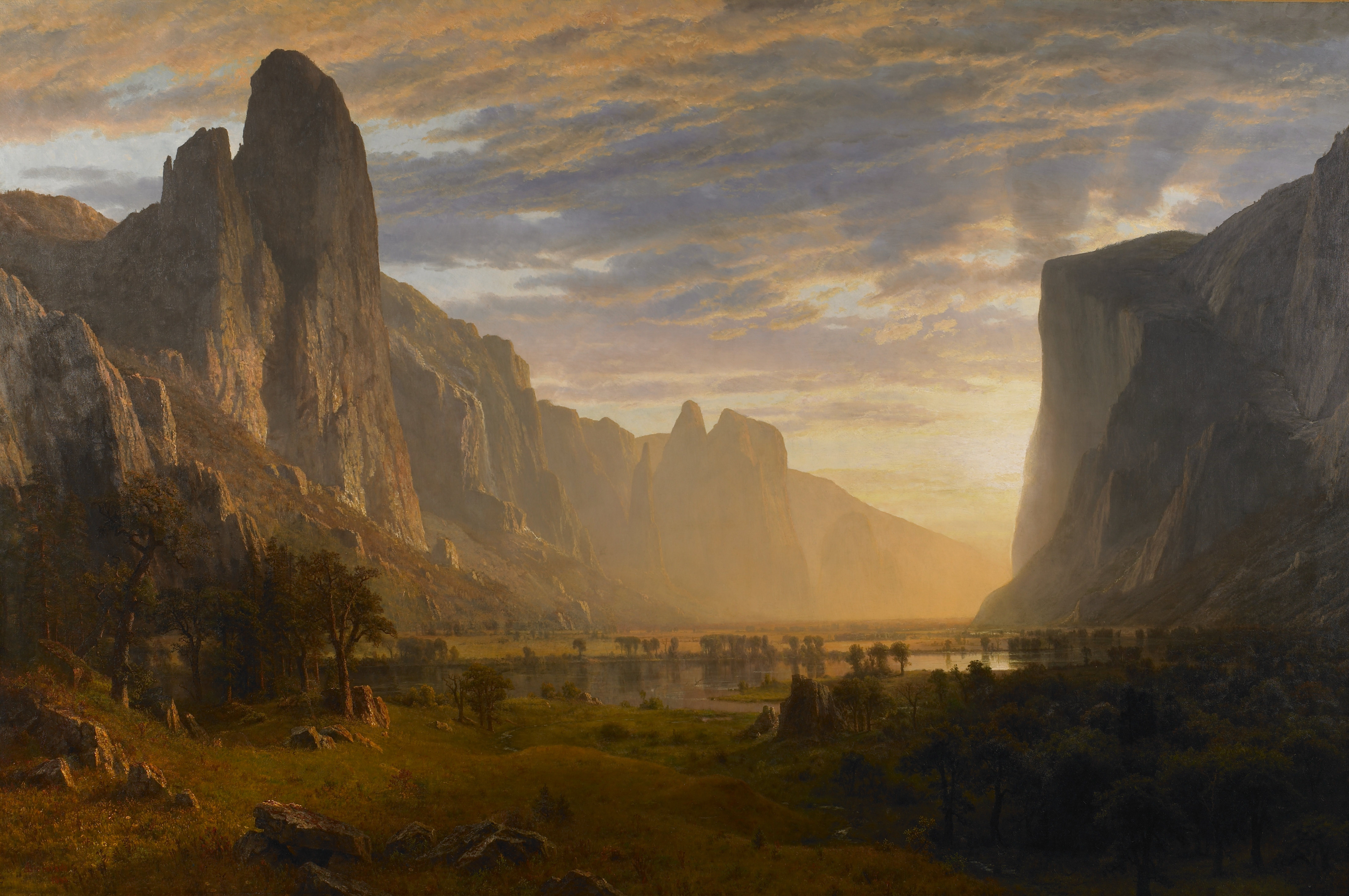
Albert Bierstadt's Looking Down Yosemite Valley from 1865 is a highlight of the museum's collection of American paintings.

The Birmingham Museum of Art is owned by the City of Birmingham and encompasses 3.9 acres (16,000 m^{2}) in the city's cultural district. Erected in 1959, the present building was designed by architects Warren, Knight & Davis, and a major renovation and expansion by Edward Larrabee Barnes of New York was completed in 1993. The facility encompasses 180,000 square feet (17,000 m^{2}), including an outdoor sculpture garden. The memorial garden at the museum was established in 1955 by Red Mountain Garden Club president, Fariss Gambrill Lynn. It was expanded and altered as the museum expanded.

The museum is part of the Monuments Men and Women Museum Network, launched in 2021 by the Monuments Men and Women Foundation.

== Collection highlights ==
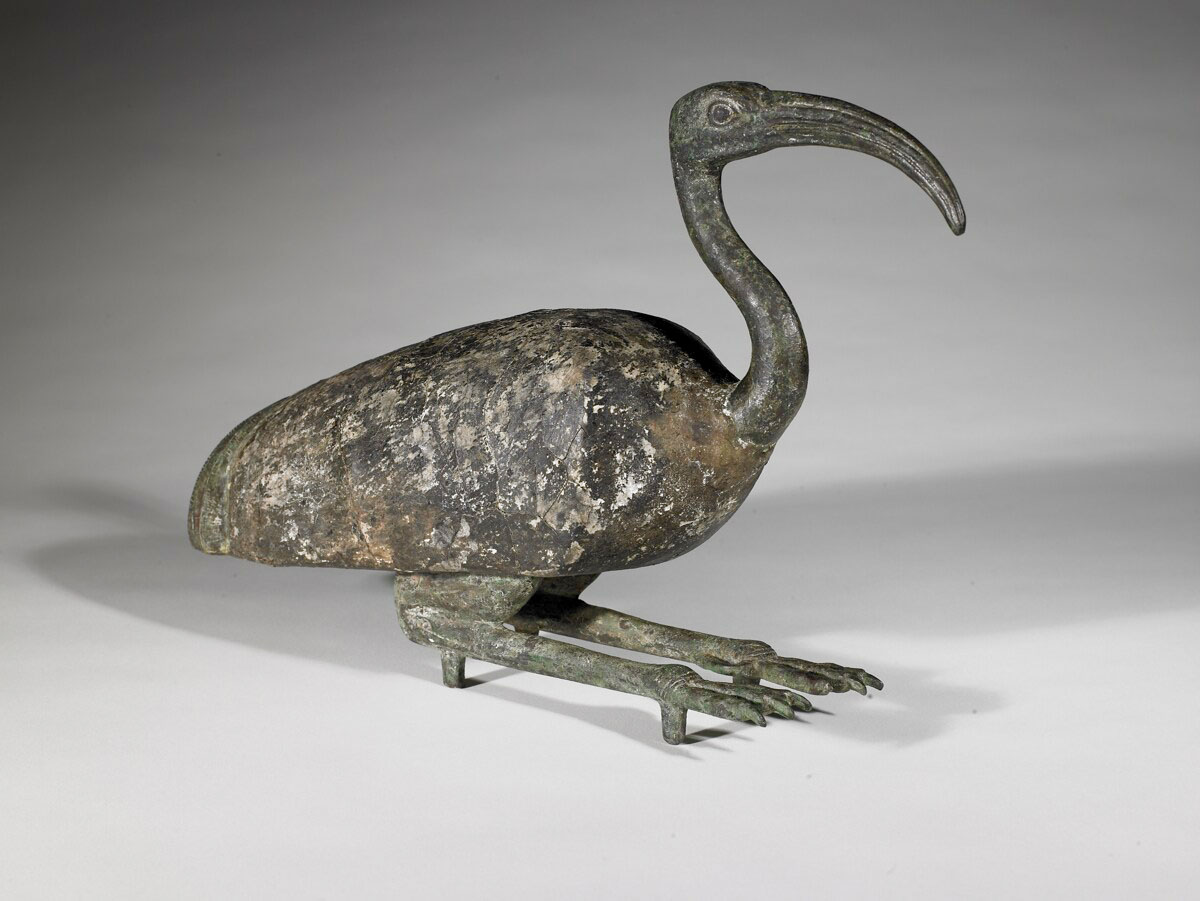
A Late Period sculpture of an ibis from Ancient Egypt's Twenty-sixth Dynasty, 664–332 BC

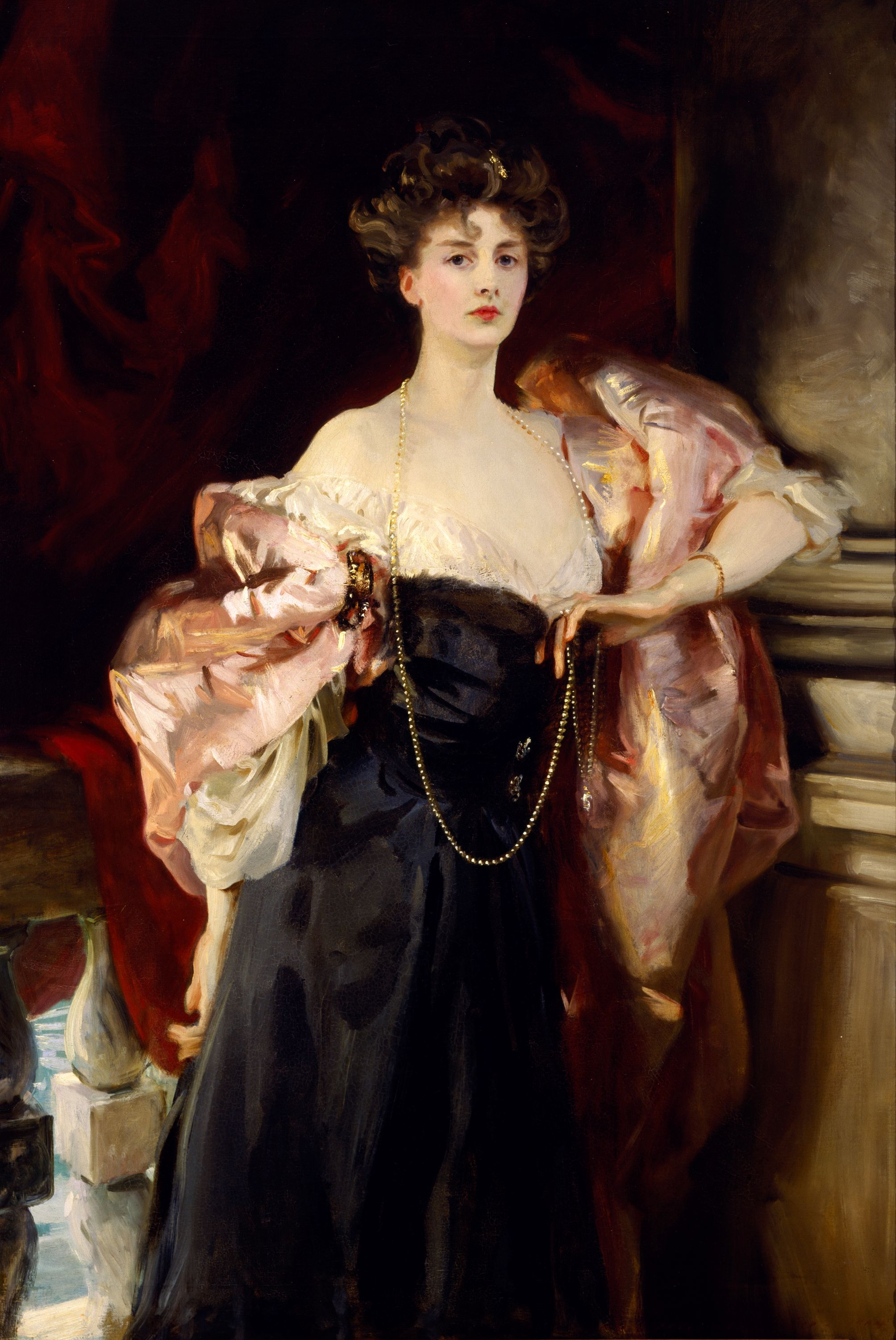
John Singer Sargent's Portrait of Helen Vincent, Viscountess D'Abernon from 1904 AD

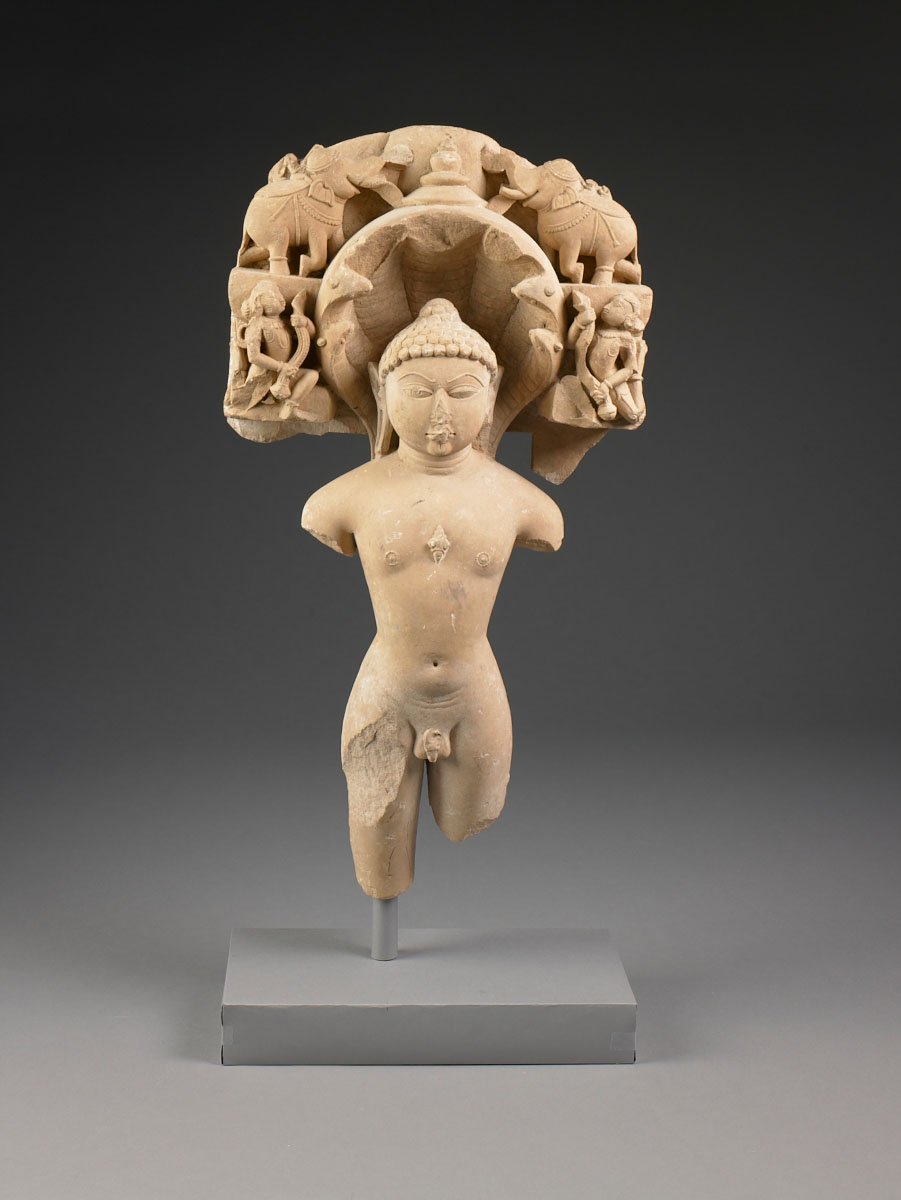
Carving of Parshvanatha, India, 950 CE

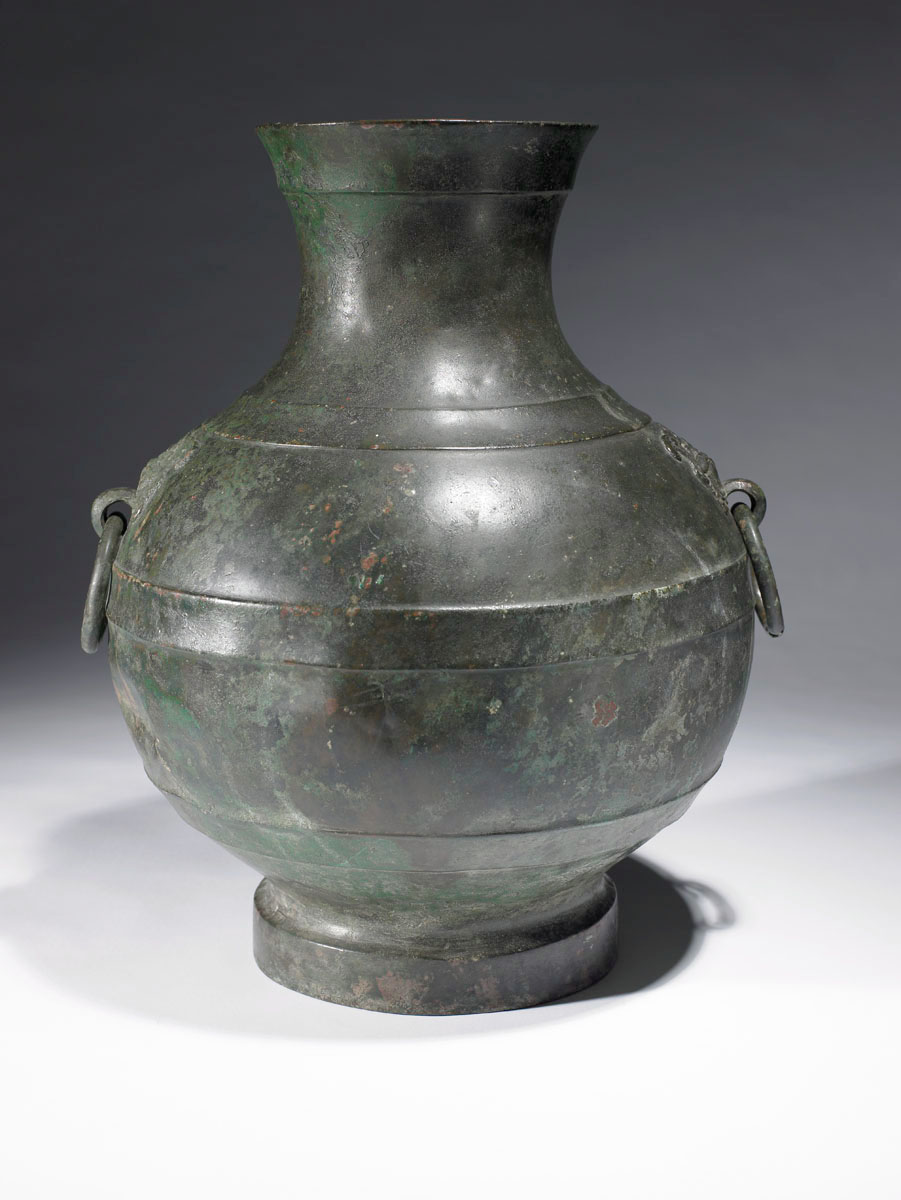
A Chinese wine vessel (hu) from 350 BC

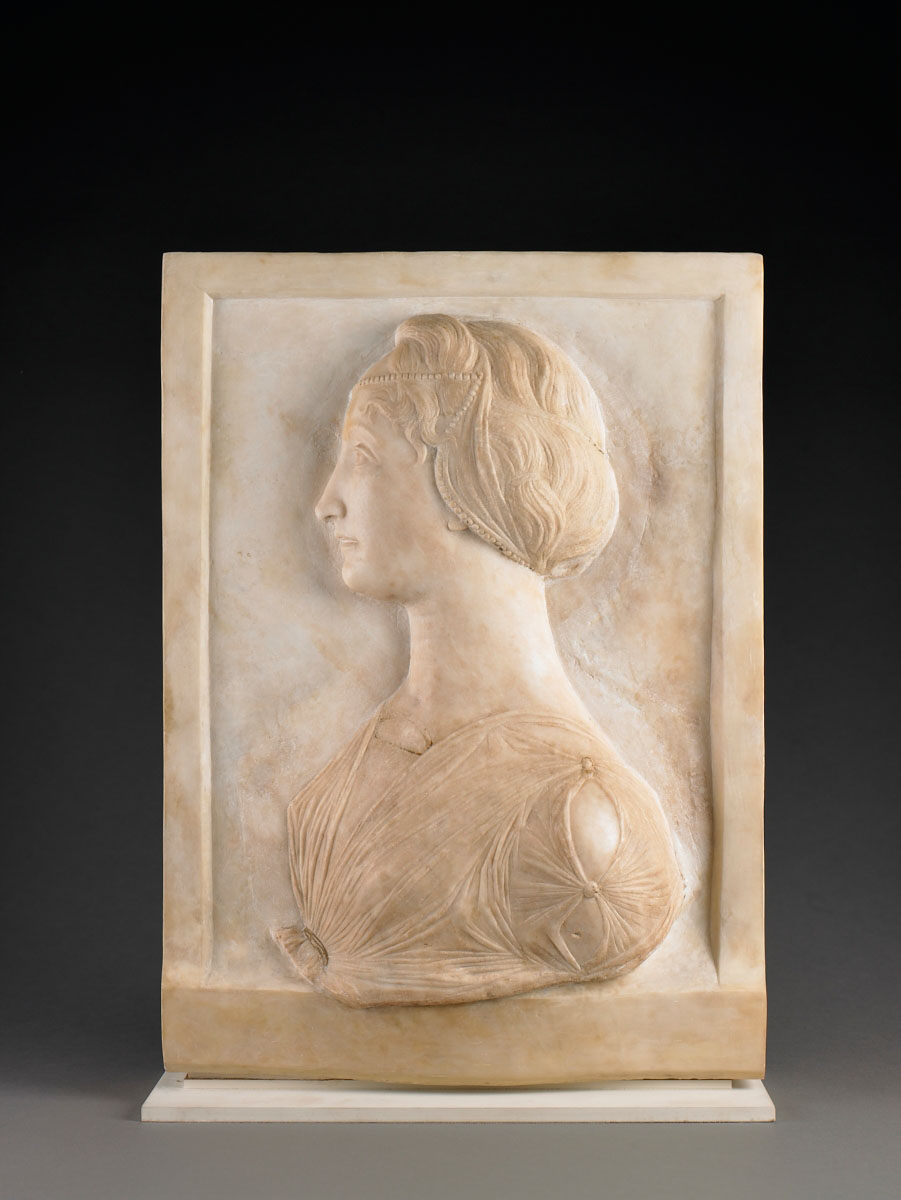
Mino da Fiesole's Profile of a Young Woman, from 1455 to 1460 AD

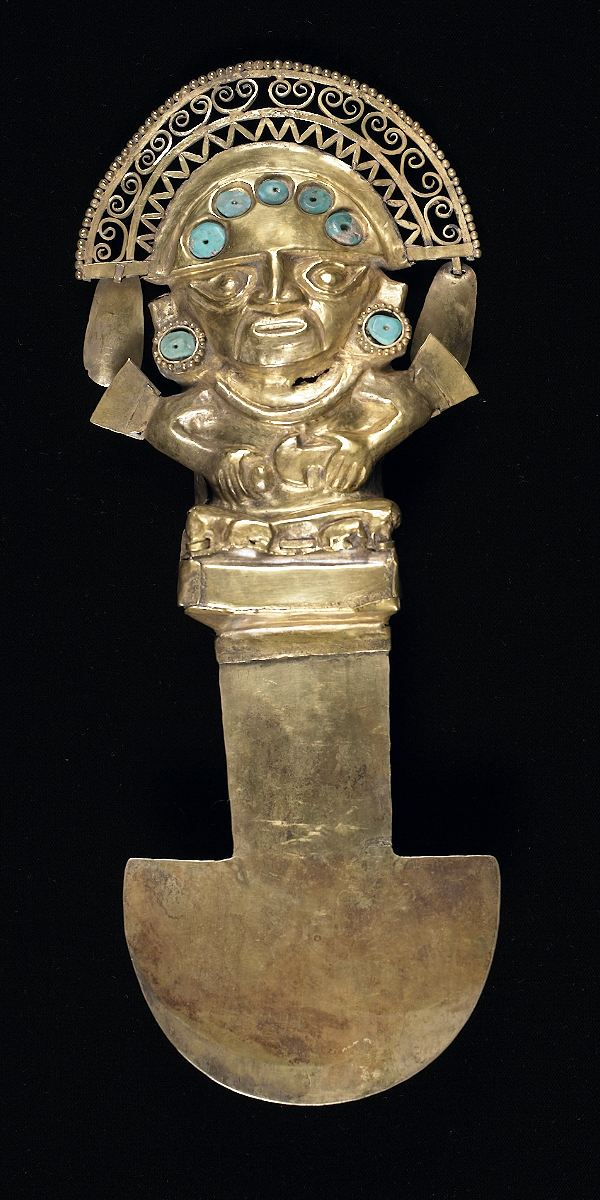
A ceremonial knife (tumi) from the Sican culture of Peru, dating between 900 and 1100 AD

=== African art ===
The museum's collection of nearly 2,000 objects of African art is derived from the major culture groups of sub-Saharan Africa and dates from the 12th century to the present. The collection features figure sculpture, masks, ritual objects, furniture and household and utilitarian objects, textiles, ceramics and metal arts, with an Egyptian false door, Yoruba mask, Benin bronze hip pendant, and a divination portrait of a king from Dahomey.

=== American art ===
Spanning the late 18th through mid-20th century, the museum's collection of American painting, sculpture, works on paper, and decorative arts features paintings by Gilbert Stuart, Childe Hassam, and Georgia O'Keeffe; sculptures by Hiram Powers and Frederic Remington; and decorative pieces by Tiffany Studios and Frank Lloyd Wright. The museum's Looking Down Yosemite Valley, California (1865) by Bierstadt was chosen by the National Endowment for the Humanities as one of 40 American masterpieces that best depict the people, places, and events that have shaped America and tell its story.

=== Art of Alabama ===
Since opening in 1951, the Birmingham Museum of Art has collected and exhibited the art of Alabama. Among the earliest works to enter the collection were paintings by significant Alabama artists including the miniaturist Hannah Elliott and the landscapist Carrie Hill. In 1995, the museum organized Made in Alabama, an exhibition of art made within the state during the 19th century. In addition to collecting the works of academically trained native artists, the museum has built a collection of folk art, including painting, sculpture, quilts, and pottery.

=== Asian art ===
The museum's Asian art collection started with a gift of Chinese textiles in 1951, and now has over 4,000 objects. The collection hails from China, Korea, Japan, India, and Southeast Asia, featuring a collection of Vietnamese ceramics, Buddhist and Hindu art, lacquer ware, ceramics, paintings, prints, and sculpture. Highlights include a rare Ming dynasty temple wall and Tang dynasty tomb figures from China; Jomon period pottery from Japan; and contemporary works such as The Grand Residence, considered by Chinese painter Wu Guanzhong among his most important works. Also, on long-term loan from The Smithsonian Institution is the Vetlesen Jade Collection of 16th to 19th-century pieces, one of the most important jade collections in the US.

=== Contemporary art ===
The collection features painting, sculpture, video, photography, works on paper, and installation art from the 1960s to the present, ranging from artists such as Joan Mitchell, Andy Warhol, Bill Viola, Lynda Benglis, Cham Hendon, Kerry James Marshall, Callum Innes, Grace Hartigan, Larry Rivers, Louise Nevelson, Frank Fleming and Philip Guston. The Modern and Contemporary Art collection also contains work by photographers William Christenberry, Robert Frank, Duane Michals, Gordon Parks, and Philip Trager, as well as images from the civil rights era by Danny Lyon, Spider Martin, Chris McNair, Charles Moore, and Wayne Sides.

=== Folk art ===
Since 2009, a permanent display of folk art has featured works by Bill Traylor, Thornton Dial, Alabama's quilters, and other self-taught artists. The Robert Cargo Folk Art Collection was donated to the museum in 2013.

=== European art ===
Among the European art holdings is the Kress Collection of Renaissance Art, featuring Renaissance and Baroque paintings, sculpture and decorative arts dating from the late 13th century to c. 1750, with works by Pietro Perugino, Antonio Canaletto, and Paris Bordone. Other strengths include 17th-century Dutch paintings by Jacob van Ruisdael, Ferdinand Bol, and Balthasar van der Ast; British 18th-century painting, with portraits by Thomas Gainsborough and Thomas Lawrence; and 18th- and 19th-century French paintings by Francois-Hubert Drouais, Jean-Baptiste Oudry, Mary Cassatt, Gustave Courbet, and Jean-Baptiste-Camille Corot.

One of the foundations of the museum's permanent collection, the European decorative arts comprise more than 12,000 objects including ceramics, glass, and furniture dating from the Renaissance to present day. Notable holdings include the only public collection of late 19th-century European cast iron items in the US and the Eugenia Woodward Hitt Collection of 18th-century French art, including furniture of the Louis XIV, XV, and XVI periods, mounted porcelain, gilt bronzes, paintings, and works on paper from the Regénce to the period following the French Revolution. The Dwight and Lucille Beeson Wedgwood Collection comprises more than 1,400 objects illustrating the entire production of the Wedgwood factory from its early years through the 19th century.

=== Native American art ===
The museum features a large installation of Native American arts. The galleries are organized into four cultural groupings according to region: Eastern Woodlands, Plains, Northwest Coast, and Southwest. Highlights of the collection include a large grouping of fine Navajo blankets and rugs, an extensive collection of Northwest coast art, and important historic and contemporary Pueblo ceramics. There also are examples of Plains beadwork and shaman headdresses.

=== Pre-Columbian art ===
The collection features objects from Meso-America, Central America, and the Northern Andes. Highlights from Meso-America include Zapotec ceramics, objects related to the ballgame, Maya figure sculpture, ceramics and jewelry, Aztec stone sculpture, and West Mexican figural tomb sculpture. Cultures of ancient Costa Rica, Guatemala, and Panama are well represented: works include gold jewelry, metates, censors, volcanic stone figure sculpture, and ceramics. Northern Andean objects include Sican ceremonial gold vessels and tumi, ceramics from the Moche, Chimu, Chancay, and Vicus cultures, Incan keros and mummy masks, and Peruvian textiles.

=== The Charles W. Ireland Sculpture Garden ===
This multi-level sculpture garden features works by artists such as Fernando Botero, Jacques Lipchitz and Auguste Rodin as well as three site-specific artworks commissioned by the Museum: Lithos II (1993) by Elyn Zimmerman, a water wall and pool of textured granite blocks set into the curving east wall of the garden; Blue Pools Courtyard (1993) by artist Valerie Jaudon, featuring inlaid tile pools, plantings, and brick and bluestone pavers; and Sol LeWitt's Bands of Color in Various Directions, commissioned in 2001 in celebration of the museum's 50th anniversary.

=== The Clarence B. Hanson Jr. Library ===
Named for Clarence Bloodworth Hanson Jr., former publisher of the Birmingham News and a Birmingham Museum of Art board member for 24 years, the museum's library includes holdings such as general art reference works, auction catalogues, artists' files, periodicals, indexes, exhibition catalogs, and databases. The Chellis Wedgwood Library includes letters from John Flaxman and Benjamin West, and Sir William Hamilton's collection of engravings from antique vases, known as the Hamilton Folios, the first European color-plate books.

== History ==
=== Birmingham Art Club ===
The roots of the museum date back to 1908 and the founding of the Birmingham Art Club which aimed to build a public art collection for the citizens of Birmingham, which had been founded as a new industrial city only 37 years prior. In 1927 they were able to display their collection in the galleries of the new Birmingham Public Library. Over the next two decades the club continued to add to the collection and raise support in the press and in city hall for a new building.

=== First exhibition ===
In September 1950, a governing board was created to oversee the creation of a museum as "an institution of public service, educational and recreational, with all the people welcome". The following February the board hired Richard Foster Howard to serve as the first museum director. In April 1951 the newly established Birmingham Museum of Art presented a public "opening exhibition" housed in five unused rooms in city hall. The exhibition included some pieces from the existing Art Club collection as well as a large number of loaned works from museums across the eastern half of the United States.

=== New building ===
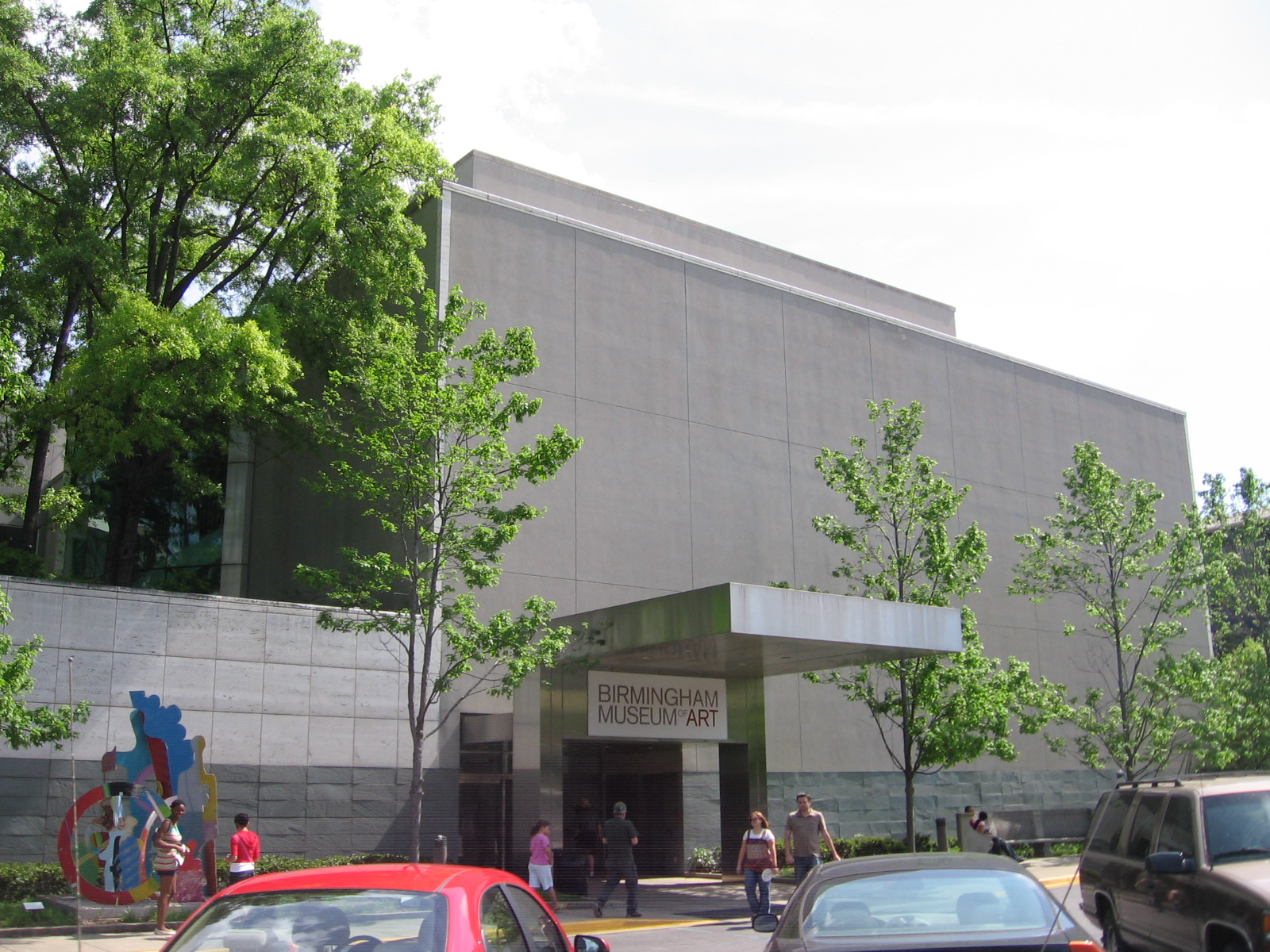
North public entrance off the west wing of the museum

The publicity created by the exhibition led to several gifts, notably of Chinese ceramics and textiles, Japanese prints, old master prints, costumes, glass, and oil paintings. In 1952 the Samuel H. Kress Foundation presented 29 paintings from the Italian Renaissance as a long-term loan to the new museum, forming the core of the collection of European paintings. A large bequest in 1954 made possible a new museum building. Land was purchased the following year, and a design commission for a new museum building was given to the office of Warren, Knight & Davis. The Oscar Wells Memorial Building opened to the public on May 3, 1959. In the following years, the Kress Foundation made two gifts to the museum: the trusteeship of a collection of Renaissance furniture and decorative objects in 1959, and the deed to the Italian paintings already on loan, along with eight additional works from the same period. The following year, the American Cast Iron Pipe Company loaned its Lamprecht Collection of German cast-iron objects.

=== Expansions ===
A level of upper floor galleries was added to the building's west wing in 1965. In 1967 a new east wing was completed. Additional land was purchased in 1969, and in 1974 another addition included a three-story rebuilding of the east wing. Further reworking of the east wing added a conservation lab, loading dock, and a second public entrance to the building in 1979, and the following year, gallery space was expanded by 28,000 square feet (2,600 m^{2}). In 1986 another expansion project was planned and architect Edward Larrabee Barnes, in conjunction with local architect KPS Group, Inc., was selected to oversee the design, which included provision for a new outdoor sculpture garden and 50,000 square feet (5,000 m^{2}) of exhibition space bringing the total to 180,000 square feet (15,400 m^{2}).

== See also ==
- List of largest art museums
- North American Reciprocal Museums
