= Dan Van Dyk =

American politician

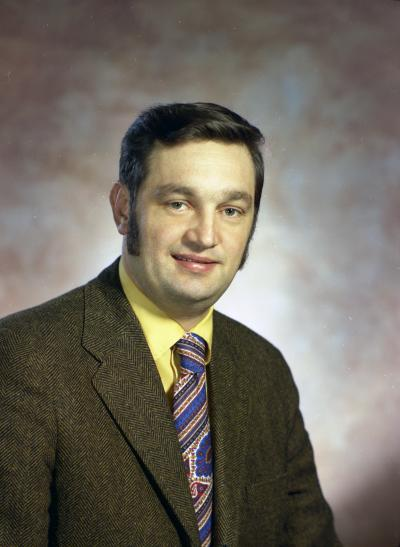
- Van Dyk in 1971

Member of the Washington House of Representatives for the 42nd district
- In office 1971–1975

Personal details
- Born: Ralph Daniel Van Dyk; November 25, 1942 Bellingham, Washington, United States
- Died: November 29, 2004 (aged 62) Tacoma, Washington, United States
- Party: Democratic
- Occupation: Dairy farmer

Ralph Daniel Van Dyk (November 25, 1942 – November 29, 2004) was an American politician in the state of Washington. He served the 42nd district from 1971 to 1975.
