= Sid Flanagan =

American politician

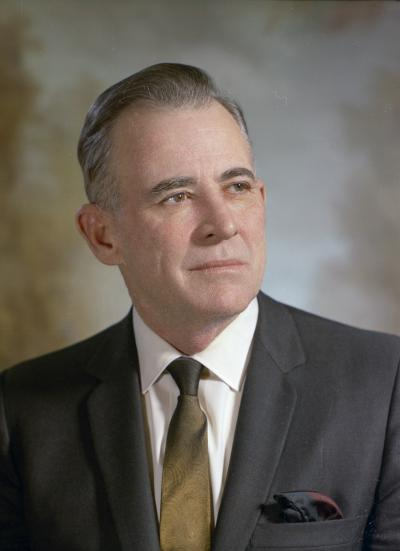
- Flanagan in 1967

Member of the Washington House of Representatives for the 3rd district
- In office 1961–1983

Personal details
- Born: September 26, 1909 Bellingham, Washington, United States
- Died: February 1, 1990 (aged 80) Quincy, Washington, United States
- Party: Republican

Sylvester E. (Sid) Flanagan (September 26, 1909 – February 1, 1990) was an American politician in the state of Washington. He served in the Washington House of Representatives from 1961 to 1983.
