= School of Visual Concepts =

Arts college in Seattle, Washington

Coordinates: 47°37′3.9″N 122°20′29.76″W

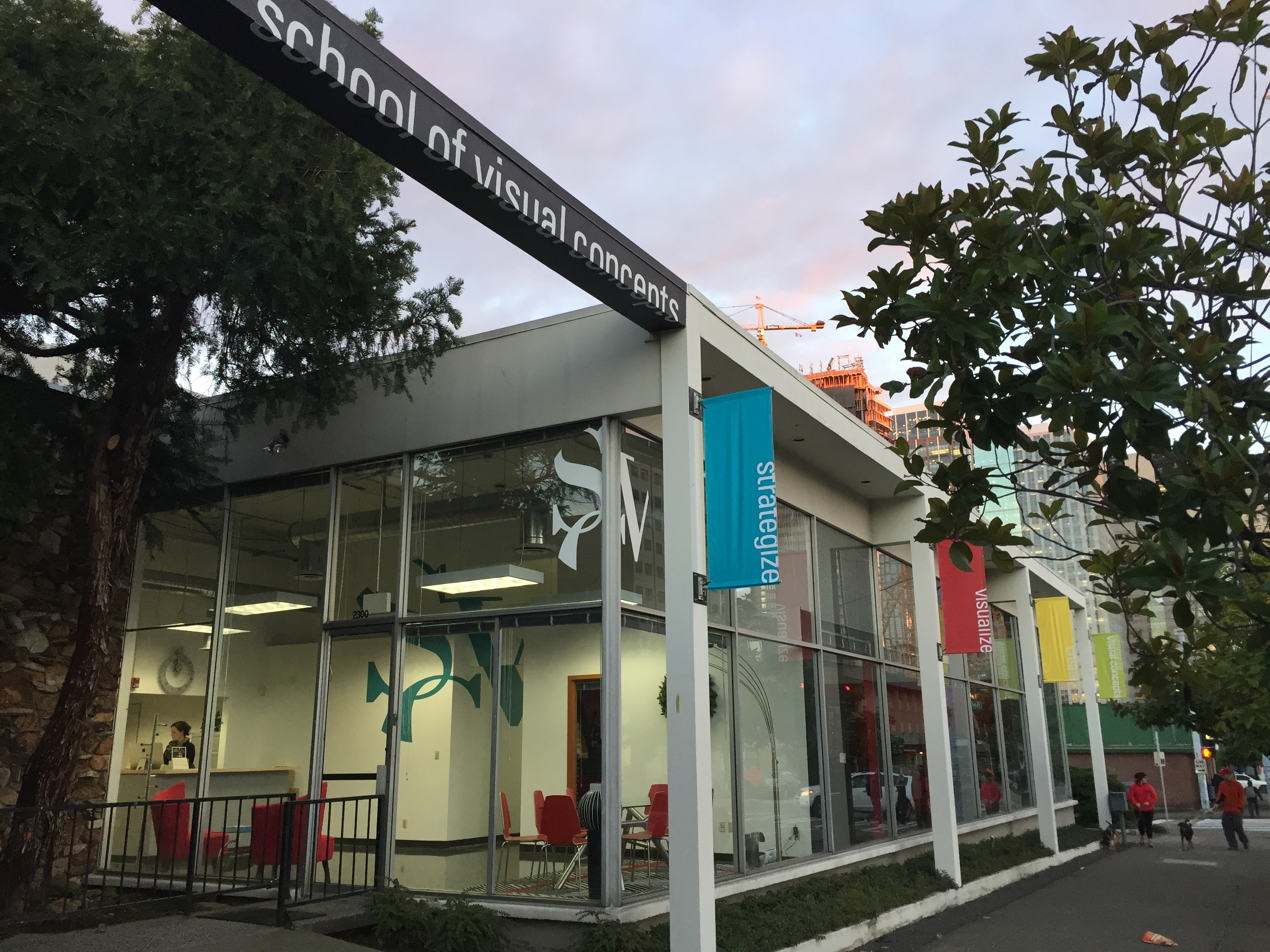
The front of the school at 2300 7th Ave, Seattle, WA

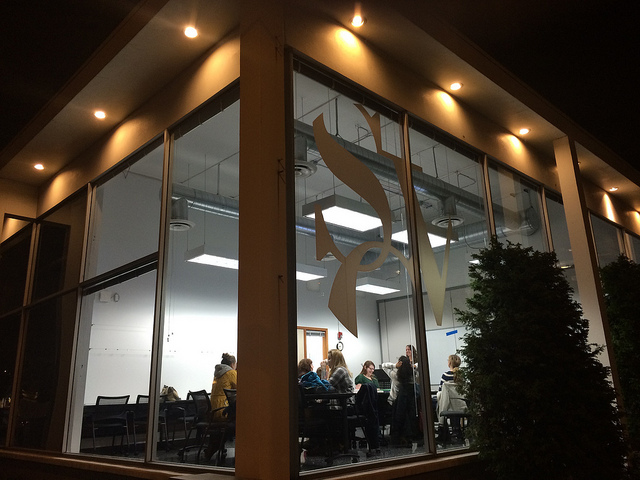
School of Visual Concepts at night

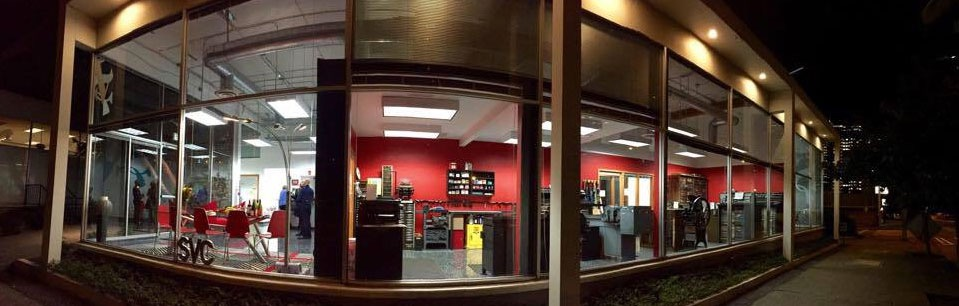
School of Visual Concepts letterpress shop at night

The School of Visual Concepts in Seattle, Washington, is a vocational school training students and working professionals in the fields of user experience, content strategy/design, writing for user experience, graphic design, web design, and marketing communications.

Founded in 1971 (55 years ago) by the husband-and-wife team of illustrators, Dick and Cherry Brown, the school's teaching philosophy is based on the premise that working professionals, not career teachers or full-time faculty, can provide the most current, relevant instruction. As such, SVC does not offer degrees, but does provide students with the ability to earn a certificate in their program of study.

In addition to evening courses and daytime workshops in the marketing communications field, SVC also had one of the largest public letterpress printing teaching shops in the Pacific Northwest region of the United States. As of 2020, letterpress classes are offered by Partners in Print.

The school closed their building during the COVID 19 pandemic and currently only offers online classes and workshops.

Notable alums include best-selling children's author, Leslie Patricelli.
