= Smash the Windows =

Studio album by Mischief Brew
- Released: July 12, 2005
- Genre: Folk punk, gypsy punk
- Length: 48:43
- Label: Fistolo Records, Gunner Records

Mischief Brew chronology
Bakenal (2003)	Smash the Windows (2005)	Songs from Under the Sink (2006)

Smash the Windows is the first full-length album from the DIY folk punk band Mischief Brew. The album was released in 2005 by Fistolo Records (US), and in 2006 by Gunner Records (EU). It was recorded in Williamsburg, Brooklyn, NY at Vibromonk Studios by Tamir Muskat and Danny Shatzky, December 2004-January 2005. The album has guest appearances from members of World Inferno, Guignol, Evil Robot Us', and Leftöver Crack.

== Critical reception ==
Reviews for 'Smash the Windows' were mixed, but mostly favorable. Punknews called it, "DIY folk punk at its finest," while HeartattaCk Zine praised the lyrics: "Poetic anthems to a downtrodden life and the hope for a brighter tomorrow that inspire you to throw a wrench in the gears and enjoy what little of the natural world is left." Razorcake Magazine, however, described it as "Sub-Pogues pseudo Celtic style balladeering," claiming that it "[never] really rocks out; it just plods along like a campfire singalong."

Shortly after its release, The Village Voice rated Erik Petersen/Mischief Brew "Best Anarchist Political Folk-Punk Singer" in their Best of NYC 2005 Issue. Alternative Press rated "A Liquor Never Brewed" one of the "Top Ten Essential Folk Punk Songs."

== Track listing ==
1. "The Reinvention of the Printing Press" - 2:41
2. "Citizens Drive" - 4:28
3. "Lightning Knock the Power Out" - 3:43
4. "Nomads Revolt" - 4:04
5. "The Lowly Carpenter" - 3:04
6. "Ten Thousand Fleas" - 3:52
7. "Swing Against the Nazis" - 3:04
8. "From the Rooftops" - 4:37
9. "The Gypsy, the Punk, and the Fool (A Tale)" - 6:21
10. "Roll Me Through the Gates of Hell" - 3:36
11. "Ain't It the Life?" - 3:20
12. "A Liquor Never Brewed (with Guignol)" - 3:21
13. "Departure Arrival" - 2:39

== Personnel ==
- Erik Petersen - Vocals, guitar, mandolin, percussion
- Sean Yantz - Bass
- Chris "Doc" Kulp - Drums, bodhran, marimba, junk percussion
- Julian Tomas Buchanan - Saxophone
- Franz Nicolay - Accordion
- Peter Hess - Clarinet
- Denise Vertucci - Vocals
- Scott Sturgeon - Vocals
- Jim Kydonieus - Upright bass
- Tamir Muskat - Engineer
- Danny Shatzky - Engineer
- Steve Roche - Engineer
