= Robert Blake (folk singer) =

American musician

Robert Sarazin Blake is an American singer-songwriter hailing from Bellingham, Washington. Blake is generally considered a folk musician, though his music incorporates elements of traditional Celtic songwriters, modern punk rock, country, and blues all blended together with a heavy dose of improvisation. This melding of varying genres produces a "speed strumming style" that functions as a backdrop to Blake's narrative style of songwriting. Although Blake also writes songs centered on love and his personal life, his leftist-anarchist politics feature prominently in many of his works. Examples of this can be found in songs such as "Didn't We" (Jim Page), "Culture of Resistance", and "Philadelphia"; all of which promote the values of an anti-consumerist and independent spirit.

He is known for his extensive touring; often traversing the entire United States and Ireland for much of the year. Although such an exhaustive touring schedule occupies a lot of Blake's time, he also makes sure to spend a good part of his time in and around his hometown of Bellingham, WA, where he organizes and performs in the Subdued String Band Jamboree each year in addition to playing and recording at many of the local bars and clubs. In addition to his extensive touring schedule, which takes him to venues ranging from the venerable 924 Gilman Street in Berkeley, CA and the folk club The Tin Angel in Philadelphia, Pennsylvania, to garages and basements around the world, Blake also runs his own record label: Same Room Records.

== Discography ==
Humdinger Days and Humdinger Nights. Same Room Records, 2000.
The High, Wide, and Handsome Band. Same Room Records, 2000.
A Crowd of Drunken Lovers. Same Room Records, 2001.
Bellingham and Philadelphia. (split CD with Erik Petersen). Art of the Underground, 2002.
Still Kissing Last Night's Smoke Stained Lips. Art of the Underground, 2004.
The Beautiful and the Afternoon. Same Room Records, 2007.
The Air Your Lungs Forced Out. Same Room Records, 2007.
Put It All Down in a Letter. Same Room Records, 2011.
A Long Series of Memorable Nights Forgotten: The Belfast Sessions (with John McSherry). Same Room Records, 2011.

Robt Sarazin Blake. Same Room Records, 2013.

Recitative, 2017.

Let The Longing Run Wild & Free, 2025.
