= List of Toronto FC records and statistics =

This page details Toronto FC records from their inaugural season in 2007 as a member of Major League Soccer. It includes player records, attendances and competition information. All records listed are from competitive matches only, unless otherwise stated.

== Honours ==
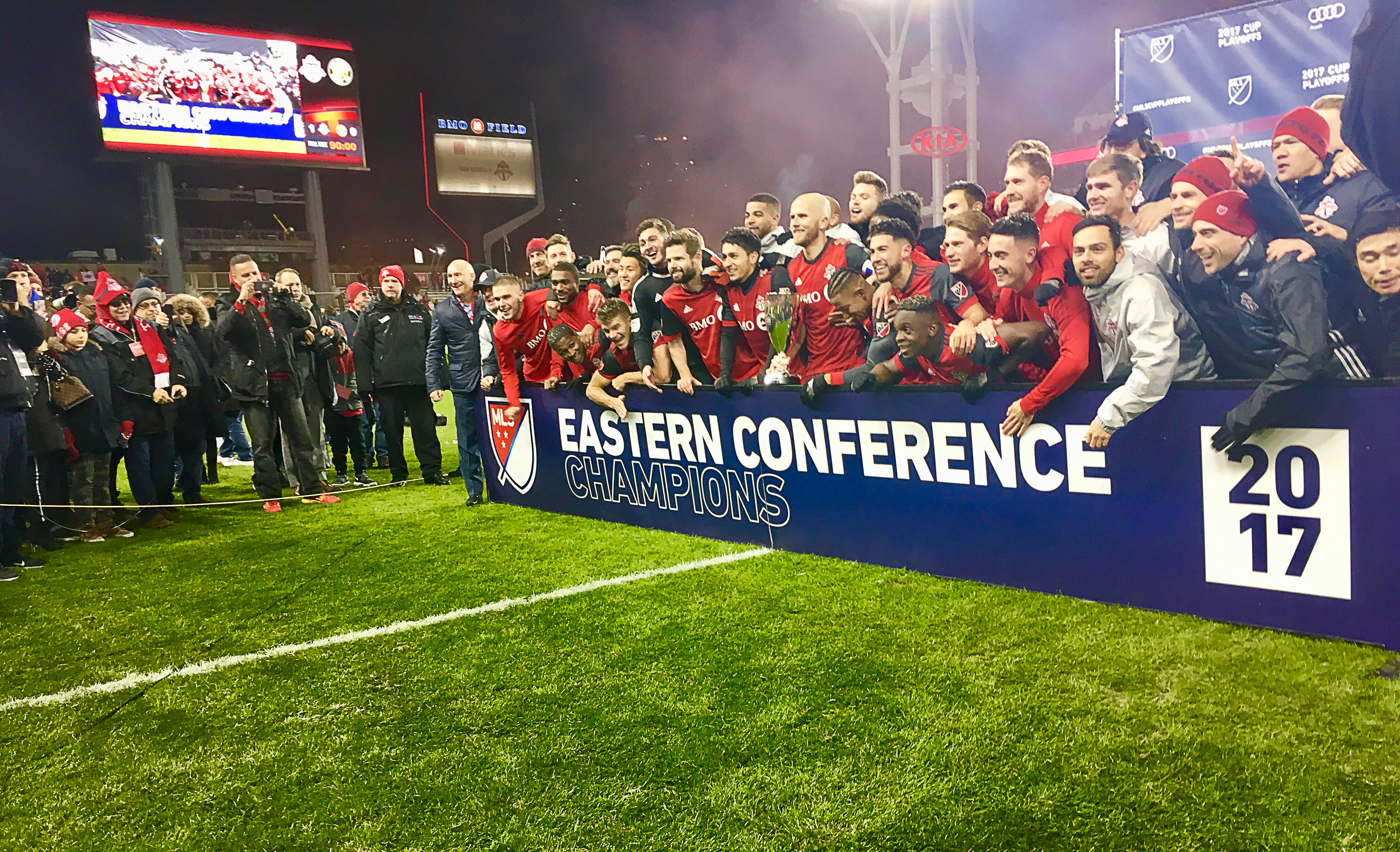
Toronto FC players celebrate the 2017 MLS Eastern Conference Championship

Domestic
| Competitions | Titles | Seasons |
| MLS Cup | 1 | 2017 |
| Supporters' Shield | 1 | 2017 |
| Eastern Conference (Playoff) | 3 | 2016, 2017, 2019 |
| Eastern Conference (Regular Season) | 1 | 2017 |
| Canadian Championship | 8 | 2009, 2010, 2011, 2012, 2016, 2017, 2018, 2020 |

=== Other honours ===
- CONCACAF Champions League
  - Runners-up: 2018
- Campeones Cup
  - Runners-up: 2018
- MLS Cup
  - Runners-up (2): 2016, 2019
- Supporters' Shield
  - Runners-up: 2020
- Eastern Conference (Regular Season)
  - Runners-up: 2020
  - Third place: 2016
- Canadian Championship
  - Runners-up (6): 2008, 2014, 2019, 2021, 2022, 2024

=== Friendly ===
- Carolina Challenge Cup
  - Runners-up (2): 2007, 2009
  - Third place: 2010
- Walt Disney World Pro Soccer Classic
  - Runners-up (2): 2010, 2012
- Texas Pro Soccer Festival
  - Third place: 2008

== Individual records ==
=== Appearances ===
- **Youngest player** – (Canada) Jahkeele Marshall-Rutty, 16 years 4 months 8 days (at Philadelphia Union, MLS, October 24, 2020)
- **Youngest starter** – (United States) Fuad Ibrahim, 16 years 11 months 3 days (v. San Jose Earthquakes, MLS, July 19, 2008)
- **Oldest player** – (Canada) Rick Titus, 39 years 5 months 27 days (v. Chivas USA, MLS, September 6, 2008)
- **Most consecutive appearances** – (United States) Chad Barrett, 39 (August 3, 2008 – August 4, 2009)

As of November 7, 2026

| Rank | Player | Toronto career | League | Playoffs | Canadian Championship | CONCACAF Champions Cup | Other | Total |
|---|---|---|---|---|---|---|---|---|
| 1 | (Canada) **Jonathan Osorio** | 2013– | 351 | 17 | 34 | 12 | 7 | 421 |
| 2 | (United States) Michael Bradley | 2014–2023 | 258 | 17 | 17 | 14 | 2 | 308 |
| 3 | (United States) Justin Morrow | 2014–2021 | 207 | 16 | 20 | 10 | 1 | 254 |
| 4 | (United States) Mark Delgado | 2015–2021 | 181 | 11 | 17 | 14 | 2 | 225 |
| 5 | (United States) Jozy Altidore | 2015–2021 | 139 | 13 | 9 | 10 | 2 | 173 |
| 5 | (Canada) **Richie Laryea** | 2019–2021; 2022–2023; 2024– | 151 | 5 | 10 | 3 | 4 | 173 |
| 7 | (Canada) Ashtone Morgan | 2011–2019 | 127 | 0 | 19 | 22 | 0 | 168 |
| 8 | (United States) Alex Bono | 2015–2022 | 130 | 5 | 7 | 14 | 1 | 157 |
| 9 | (Democratic Republic of the Congo) Chris Mavinga | 2017–2022 | 124 | 10 | 11 | 7 | 1 | 153 |
| 10 | (El Salvador) Eriq Zavaleta | 2015–2021 | 118 | 11 | 14 | 8 | 1 | 152 |

Bold indicates player still active with club.

=== Goalscorers ===
- **Most goals in a season** (all competitions) – (Italy) Sebastian Giovinco, 23 (2015) (22 in MLS)
- **Most goals in a game** – (Canada) Deandre Kerr, 4 (v. CS Saint-Laurent, Canadian Championship, May 21, 2024)
- **Fastest goal** – (Japan) Tsubasa Endoh, 29 seconds (v. Atlanta United FC, MLS, June 26, 2019)
- **Youngest scorer** – (United States) Fuad Ibrahim, 16 years 10 months 27 days (at Chicago Fire, MLS, July 12, 2008)
- **Oldest scorer** – (France) Benoît Cheyrou, 36 years 0 months 20 days (at Ottawa Fury, Canadian Championship, May 23, 2017)
- **Most consecutive MLS games with a goal** – 5, (Canada) Dwayne De Rosario (April 10 – May 1, 2010) and (Netherlands) Danny Koevermans (June 20 – July 4, 2012)

As of October 28, 2026

| Rank | Player | Toronto career | League | Playoffs | Canadian Championship | CONCACAF Champions Cup | Other | Total |
|---|---|---|---|---|---|---|---|---|
| 1 | (Italy) Sebastian Giovinco | 2015–2018 | 68 | 5 | 6 | 4 | 0 | 83 |
| 2 | (United States) Jozy Altidore | 2015–2021 | 62 | 8 | 6 | 3 | 0 | 79 |
| 3 | (Canada) **Jonathan Osorio** | 2013– | 53 | 4 | 8 | 5 | 0 | 70 |
| 4 | (Canada) Dwayne De Rosario | 2009–2011; 2014 | 28 | 0 | 4 | 1 | 0 | 33 |
| 5 | (Spain) Alejandro Pozuelo | 2019–2022 | 26 | 2 | 2 | 0 | 0 | 30 |
| 6 | (Italy) Federico Bernardeschi | 2022–2025 | 25 | 0 | 1 | 0 | 0 | 26 |
| 7 | (United States) Chad Barrett | 2008–2010 | 16 | 0 | 3 | 2 | 0 | 21 |
| 7 | (Canada) Deandre Kerr | 2022–2026 | 15 | 0 | 6 | 0 | 0 | 21 |
| 9 | (United States) Michael Bradley | 2014–2023 | 16 | 1 | 2 | 0 | 0 | 19 |
| 9 | (Italy) Lorenzo Insigne | 2022–2025 | 15 | 0 | 2 | 0 | 2 | 19 |
| 9 | (Netherlands) Danny Koevermans | 2011–2013 | 17 | 0 | 0 | 2 | 0 | 19 |

Bold indicates player still active with club.

==== Debut goals ====
- (New Zealand) Jarrod Smith (at LA Galaxy, MLS, April 13, 2008)
- (Trinidad and Tobago) Julius James (v. LA Galaxy, MLS, May 31, 2008)
- (United States) Fuad Ibrahim (at Chicago Fire, MLS, July 12, 2008)
- (Canada) Ali Gerba (at Columbus Crew, MLS, July 25, 2009)
- (United States) Peri Marošević (at Portland Timbers, MLS, July 30, 2011)
- (United States) Luis Silva (v. LA Galaxy, CONCACAF Champions League, March 7, 2012)
- (United States) Justin Braun (v. FC Dallas, MLS, April 6, 2013)
- (England) Jermain Defoe (at Seattle Sounders FC, MLS, March 15, 2014)
- (United States) Jozy Altidore (at Vancouver Whitecaps FC, MLS, March 7, 2015)
- (United States) Robbie Findley (at Vancouver Whitecaps FC, MLS, March 7, 2015)
- (Argentina) Lucas Janson (at San Jose Earthquakes, MLS, August 18, 2018)
- (United States) Nick DeLeon (at Philadelphia Union, MLS, March 2, 2019)
- (Spain) Alejandro Pozuelo (v. New York City FC, MLS, March 29, 2019)
- (Nigeria) Ifunanyachi Achara (v. New York City FC, MLS, March 7, 2020)
- (Italy) Federico Bernardeschi (v. Charlotte FC, MLS, July 23, 2022)
- (Canada) Jules-Anthony Vilsaint (v. Columbus Crew, MLS, August 16, 2025)

=== Shutouts ===
- **Most shutouts in a season** – (United States) Alex Bono – 13, 2017 (10 in MLS)
- **Minutes without conceding** – 476 minutes – (Switzerland) Stefan Frei (386 min.) and (United States) Jon Conway (90 min.) (May 8, 2010 – May 29, 2010)

As of November 1, 2026

| Rank | Player | League | Playoffs | Canadian Championship | CONCACAF Champions Cup | Other | Appearances | Total |
|---|---|---|---|---|---|---|---|---|
| 1 | (United States) Alex Bono | 27 | 3 | 4 | 2 | 0 | 157 | 36 |
| 2 | (Switzerland) Stefan Frei | 19 | 0 | 6 | 2 | 0 | 99 | 27 |
| 3 | (United States) Sean Johnson | 19 | 0 | 2 | 0 | 1 | 84 | 22 |
| 4 | (United States) Clint Irwin | 9 | 3 | 5 | 0 | 0 | 50 | 17 |
| 5 | (United States) Quentin Westberg | 10 | 0 | 1 | 0 | 0 | 79 | 11 |
| 6 | (United States) Joe Bendik | 9 | 0 | 0 | 0 | 0 | 77 | 9 |
| 7 | (Canada) **Luka Gavran** | 6 | 0 | 2 | 0 | 0 | 55 | 8 |
| 7 | (Canada) Greg Sutton | 7 | 0 | 1 | 0 | 0 | 40 | 8 |
| 9 | (Serbia) Miloš Kocić | 1 | 0 | 1 | 2 | 0 | 22 | 4 |
| 9 | (United States) Chris Konopka | 4 | 0 | 0 | 0 | 0 | 24 | 4 |
| 11 | (United States) Jon Conway | 0 | 0 | 1 | 2 | 0 | 6 | 3 |
| 11 | (United States) Brian Edwards | 3 | 0 | 0 | 0 | 0 | 9 | 3 |
| 13 | (Brazil) Júlio César | 2 | 0 | 0 | 0 | 0 | 7 | 2 |
| 13 | (Canada) Kyriakos Stamatopoulos | 2 | 0 | 0 | 0 | 0 | 12 | 2 |

== Club records ==
=== Wins and points ===
- Biggest MLS home win – 5–0 (v. Orlando City SC, August 22, 2015 and v. Columbus Crew, May 26, 2017)
- Biggest MLS away win – 6–1 (at CF Montréal, May 17, 2025)
- Biggest Canadian Championship home win – 8–1 (v. Saint-Laurent, May 21, 2024)
- Biggest Canadian Championship away win – 6–1 (at Montreal Impact, June 18, 2009)
- Biggest MLS playoff home win – 5–1 (v. D.C. United, October 19, 2019)
- Biggest MLS playoff away win – 5–0 (at New York City FC, November 6, 2016)
- Biggest CONCACAF Champions League home win – 5–1 (v. Águila, August 1, 2012)
- Biggest CONCACAF Champions League away win – 3–0 (at FC Dallas, October 18, 2011 and at Águila, September 25, 2012)
- Most wins in a season – 25 in 43 games, 2017 (20 in 34 MLS games)
- Fewest MLS wins in a season – 4 in 34 games, 2023
- Most points – 69 in 34 games, 2017
- Fewest points – 22 in 34 games, 2023

=== Losses ===
- Biggest MLS home loss – 2–6 (v. Philadelphia Union, May 28, 2011)
- Biggest MLS away loss – 1–7 (at D.C. United, July 3, 2021)
- Biggest Canadian Championship home loss – 1–3 (v. Atlético Ottawa, May 5, 2026)
- Biggest Canadian Championship away loss – 0–6 (at Montreal Impact, May 1, 2013)
- Biggest MLS playoff home loss – 0–1 (v. New York Red Bulls, November 5, 2017 and v. Nashville SC, November 24, 2020)
- Biggest MLS playoff away loss – 0–3 (at Montreal Impact, October 29, 2015)
- Biggest CONCACAF Champions League home loss – 1–3 (v. Santos Laguna, August 28, 2012 and v. Cruz Azul, April 27, 2021)
- Biggest CONCACAF Champions League away loss – 0–4 (at Pumas UNAM, September 14, 2011 and at Independiente, February 19, 2019); 2–6 (at Santos Laguna, April 4, 2012)
- Most MLS losses in a season – 21 in 34 games, 2012
- Fewest losses in a season – 7 in 43 games, 2017 (5 in 34 MLS games)

=== Draws ===
- Highest scoring home draw – 4–4 (v. D.C. United, MLS, June 13, 2018 and v. Chicago Fire FC, MLS, September 5, 2026)
- Highest scoring away draw – 4–4 (at New York City FC, MLS, July 12, 2015)
- Most draws in a season – 17 in 46 games, 2011
- Most MLS draws in a season – 15 in 34 games, 2011 and 2014
- Fewest MLS draws in a season – 4 in 34 games, 2024

=== Goals ===
- Most goals scored in a game – 8 (v. CS Saint-Laurent, Canadian Championship, May 21, 2024)
- Most goals scored in an MLS game – 6 (at CF Montréal, May 17, 2025)
- Most goals scored in an MLS playoff game – 5 (at New York City FC, November 6, 2016, v. Montreal Impact, November 30, 2016 and v. D.C. United, October 19, 2019)
- Most goals scored in a CONCACAF Champions League game – 5 (v. Águila, August 1, 2012)
- Most goals scored in a season – 87 in 43 games, 2017 (74 in 34 MLS games)
- Fewest goals scored in a season – 25 in 30 games, 2007

=== Goals conceded ===
- Most shutouts in a season – 17 in 43 games, 2017 (13 in 34 MLS games)
- Most goals conceded in a game – 7 (at D.C. United, July 3, 2021)
- Most goals conceded in a season – 80 in 47 games, 2018
- Most MLS goals conceded in a season – 67 in 34 games, 2026
- Fewest goals conceded in a season – 43 in 43 games, 2017 (37 in 34 MLS games)

=== Firsts ===
Pre-season friendlies from 2007 only counted if 90 minutes against professional opposition.

- First game – v. Houston Dynamo, Carolina Challenge Cup, March 25, 2007 (0–2)
- First win – v. New York Red Bulls, Carolina Challenge Cup, March 28, 2007 (2–1)
- First goal – (United States) Alecko Eskandarian (v. New York Red Bulls, Carolina Challenge Cup, March 28, 2007)

==== MLS firsts ====
- First game – at Chivas USA, April 7, 2007 (0–2)
- First home game – v. Kansas City Wizards, April 28, 2007 (0–1)
- First win – v. Chicago Fire, May 12, 2007 (3–1)
- First away draw – at Columbus Crew, May 26, 2007 (2–2)
- First away win – at Real Salt Lake, July 4, 2007 (2–1)
- First shutout – (Canada) Greg Sutton (v. Houston Dynamo, May 16, 2007)
- First away shutout – (Canada) Srdjan Djekanović (at Houston Dynamo, July 15, 2007)

==== MLS playoffs firsts ====
- First playoff game – at Montreal Impact, October 29, 2015 (0–3)
- First playoff home game and first playoff win – v. Philadelphia Union, October 26, 2016 (3–1)
- First playoff draw – v. Seattle Sounders FC, December 10, 2016 (0–0)
- First playoff away win – at New York City FC, November 6, 2016 (5–0)

==== MLS goals ====
- First goal – (England) Danny Dichio (1–0, v. Chicago Fire, May 12, 2007)
- First 'game-winning goal' – (United States) Kevin Goldthwaite (2–1, v. Chicago Fire, May 12, 2007)
- First away goal – (England) Danny Dichio (1–1, at Columbus Crew, May 26, 2007)
- First 'game-tying goal' – (Canada) Jim Brennan (2–2, at Columbus Crew, May 26, 2007)
- First away 'game-winning goal' – (Trinidad and Tobago) Collin Samuel (2–1, at Real Salt Lake, July 4, 2007)

==== MLS playoffs goals ====
- First playoff goal – (Italy) Sebastian Giovinco (1–0, v. Philadelphia Union, October 26, 2016)
- First playoff 'game-winning goal' – (Canada) Jonathan Osorio (2–0, v. Philadelphia Union, October 26, 2016)
- First playoff away goal – (Italy) Sebastian Giovinco (1–0, at New York City FC, November 6, 2016)
- First playoff 'game-tying goal' – (Panama) Armando Cooper (1–1, v. Montreal Impact, November 30, 2016)

==== Multiple goals ====
- First brace – (Honduras) Amado Guevara (v. Kansas City Wizards, MLS, April 28, 2008)
- First hat-trick – (Canada) Dwayne De Rosario (at Montreal Impact, Canadian Championship, June 18, 2009)
- First MLS hat-trick – (Italy) Sebastian Giovinco (at New York City FC, July 12, 2015)
- First MLS playoff hat-trick – (Italy) Sebastian Giovinco (at New York City FC, November 6, 2016)

=== Sequences ===
- Wins – 6 (April 21 – May 13, 2017 and August 12 – September 16, 2017)
- Draws – 8 (August 9 – October 4, 2025)
- Losses – 10 (June 21 – August 26, 2023)
- Games unbeaten – 11 (July 5 – September 20, 2017)
- MLS games unbeaten – 18 (August 11, 2019 – September 1, 2020)
- Games winless – 13 (July 11 – October 6, 2012, May 31 – August 26, 2023 and April 11 – July 31, 2026)
- Shutouts – 4 (May 12–22, 2010)
- MLS shutouts – 4 (July 21 – August 28, 2020)

==== At home ====
- Home wins – 7 (April 21 – June 23, 2017)
- Home games unbeaten – 18 (August 15, 2009 – August 17, 2010)
- Home MLS games unbeaten – 15 (October 23, 2016 – September 9, 2017)
- Home games unbeaten in a single season – 16 (March 31 – September 9, 2017)
- Home MLS games unbeaten in a single season – 14 (March 31 – September 9, 2017)

=== Attendance ===
All attendance at home unless otherwise specified.

- Highest attendance – 47,658 (v. LA Galaxy at Rogers Centre, CONCACAF Champions League, March 7, 2012)
- Lowest attendance – 500 (v. FC Dallas, CONCACAF Champions League, August 25, 2011)
- Highest MLS attendance – 44,828 (v. Inter Miami CF, May 9, 2026)
- Lowest MLS attendance – 14,018 (v. FC Cincinnati, May 14, 2025)

==== Other competitions ====
- Highest Canadian Championship attendance – 26,539 (v. Montreal Impact, June 27, 2017)
- Lowest Canadian Championship attendance – 3,651 (v. York United, September 22, 2021)
- Highest friendly attendance – 22,089 (v. Real Madrid, August 7, 2009)
- Lowest friendly attendance – 18,097 (v. Pachuca, July 5, 2008)

==== Not involving Toronto FC ====
- Highest attendance at BMO Field – 43,036 (Germany v. Ivory Coast, June 20, 2026, Panama v. Croatia, June 23, 2026, Senegal v. Iraq, June 26, 2026, Portugal v. Croatia, July 2, 2026)
- Highest MLS attendance at BMO Field – 21,700 (FC Dallas v. Colorado Rapids, MLS Cup 2010, November 21, 2010)
- Highest non-soccer attendance at BMO Field (as Exhibition Stadium) – 40,148 (NHL Centennial Classic, January 1, 2017)

=== Average attendance ===
| Year | Reg. Season |
|---|---|
| 2007 | 20,134 |
| 2008 | 20,108 |
| 2009 | 20,344 |
| 2010 | 20,453 |
| 2011 | 20,267 |
| 2012 | 18,681 |
| 2013 | 18,131 |
| 2014 | 22,086 |
| 2015 | 23,451 |
| 2016 | 26,583 |
| 2017 | 27,647 |
| 2018 | 26,628 |
| 2019 | 25,048 |
| 2020 | 13,783 |
| 2021 | 8,422 |
| 2022 | 25,423 |
| 2023 | 25,310 |
| 2024 | 25,681 |
| 2025 | 21,353 |
| 2026 | 19,685 |

=== MLS records ===
- Joint-sixth most regular season points – 69 (2017)
- Most free kick goals by a single player – (Italy) Sebastian Giovinco, 14
- Most free kick goals by a single player in an MLS season – (Italy) Sebastian Giovinco, 6 (2017)
- Longest scoreless sequence – 824 minutes (July 7, 2007 – September 22, 2007)
- Most consecutive ties – 8 matches (August 6, 2025 – October 4, 2025)
- Most away fans at a regular season game – approx. 4,200 (at Montreal Impact, March 16, 2013)
- Coldest game involving MLS teams – −16 °C (3 °F) (at Colorado Rapids, CONCACAF Champions League, February 20, 2018)

=== Milestones ===
- First club from outside the United States in MLS (2007), to reach MLS Cup (2016), and to win the Supporters' Shield and MLS Cup (2017)
- First club to win a domestic treble (2017)
- First Liechtensteiner – Nicolas Hasler (at D.C. United, August 5, 2017)
- Last game at Giants Stadium (at New York Red Bulls, MLS, October 24, 2009)

=== Canadian Championship records ===
- First goal ( (Puerto Rico) Marco Vélez), clean sheet ( (Canada) Greg Sutton), and win – 1–0 (at Montreal Impact in the first ever game at Saputo Stadium, May 27, 2008)
- First hat-trick – (Canada) Dwayne De Rosario (at Montreal Impact, June 18, 2009)

== International competitions ==
As of August 8, 2024

=== Record by competition ===
| Competition | Pld | W | D | L | GF | GA | GD | W% |
|---|---|---|---|---|---|---|---|---|
| CONCACAF Champions League/Cup | 40 | 16 | 11 | 13 | 53 | 54 | −1 | 40.00 |
| Campeones Cup | 1 | 0 | 0 | 1 | 1 | 3 | −2 | 0.00 |
| Leagues Cup | 5 | 1 | 1 | 3 | 5 | 11 | −6 | 20.00 |
| Total | 46 | 17 | 12 | 17 | 59 | 68 | −9 | 36.96 |

=== Record by country ===
| Country | Pld | W | D | L | GF | GA | GD |
|---|---|---|---|---|---|---|---|
| El Salvador | 2 | 2 | 0 | 0 | 8 | 1 | +7 |
| Honduras | 2 | 1 | 1 | 0 | 3 | 2 | +1 |
| Mexico | 21 | 6 | 5 | 10 | 25 | 37 | −14 |
| Nicaragua | 2 | 2 | 0 | 0 | 4 | 2 | +2 |
| Panama | 6 | 3 | 1 | 2 | 5 | 7 | −2 |
| Puerto Rico | 2 | 0 | 1 | 1 | 0 | 1 | −1 |
| United States | 11 | 3 | 4 | 4 | 14 | 18 | −4 |

=== Record by club ===
| Club | Pld | W | D | L | GF | GA | GD |
|---|---|---|---|---|---|---|---|
| (El Salvador) Águila | 2 | 2 | 0 | 0 | 8 | 1 | +7 |
| (Mexico) América | 2 | 1 | 1 | 0 | 4 | 2 | +2 |
| (Panama) Árabe Unido | 2 | 1 | 0 | 1 | 1 | 1 | 0 |
| (Mexico) Atlas | 1 | 0 | 0 | 1 | 0 | 1 | −1 |
| (United States) Colorado Rapids | 2 | 1 | 1 | 0 | 2 | 0 | +2 |
| (Mexico) Cruz Azul | 4 | 1 | 1 | 2 | 3 | 5 | −2 |
| (United States) FC Dallas | 2 | 1 | 0 | 1 | 3 | 1 | +2 |
| (Mexico) Guadalajara | 2 | 1 | 0 | 1 | 3 | 3 | 0 |
| (Panama) Independiente | 2 | 0 | 1 | 1 | 1 | 5 | −4 |
| (United States) Inter Miami CF | 1 | 0 | 0 | 1 | 3 | 4 | −1 |
| (United States) LA Galaxy | 2 | 1 | 1 | 0 | 4 | 3 | +1 |
| (Mexico) León | 2 | 1 | 1 | 0 | 3 | 2 | +1 |
| (Honduras) Motagua | 2 | 1 | 1 | 0 | 3 | 2 | +1 |
| (United States) New York City FC | 1 | 0 | 0 | 1 | 0 | 5 | −5 |
| (United States) New York Red Bulls | 1 | 0 | 1 | 0 | 0 | 0 | 0 |
| (Mexico) Pachuca | 1 | 1 | 0 | 0 | 2 | 1 | +1 |
| (Mexico) Pumas UNAM | 2 | 0 | 1 | 1 | 1 | 5 | –4 |
| Puerto Rico Islanders | 2 | 0 | 1 | 1 | 0 | 1 | –1 |
| (Nicaragua) Real Estelí | 2 | 2 | 0 | 0 | 4 | 2 | +2 |
| (United States) Real Salt Lake | 2 | 0 | 1 | 1 | 2 | 5 | –3 |
| (Mexico) Santos Laguna | 4 | 0 | 1 | 3 | 4 | 11 | –7 |
| (Panama) Tauro | 2 | 2 | 0 | 0 | 3 | 1 | +2 |
| (Mexico) Tigres UANL | 3 | 1 | 0 | 2 | 5 | 7 | –2 |

=== By season ===
| Competition | Season | Round | Opponent | Home | Away | Aggregate | Ref. |
|---|---|---|---|---|---|---|---|
| CONCACAF Champions League | 2009–10 | Preliminary round | Puerto Rico Islanders | 0–1 | 0–0 | 0–1 | |
| CONCACAF Champions League | 2010–11 | Preliminary round | (Honduras) Motagua | 1–0 | 2–2 | 3–2 | |
| CONCACAF Champions League | 2010–11 | Group stage | (Panama) Árabe Unido | 1–0 | 0–1 | 3rd | |
| CONCACAF Champions League | 2010–11 | Group stage | (Mexico) Cruz Azul | 2–1 | 0–0 | 3rd | |
| CONCACAF Champions League | 2010–11 | Group stage | (United States) Real Salt Lake | 1–1 | 1–4 | 3rd | |
| CONCACAF Champions League | 2011–12 | Preliminary round | (Nicaragua) Real Estelí | 2–1 | 2–1 | 4–2 | |
| CONCACAF Champions League | 2011–12 | Group stage | (United States) FC Dallas | 0–1 | 3–0 | 2nd | |
| CONCACAF Champions League | 2011–12 | Group stage | (Panama) Tauro | 1–0 | 2–1 | 2nd | |
| CONCACAF Champions League | 2011–12 | Group stage | (Mexico) Pumas UNAM | 1–1 | 0–4 | 2nd | |
| CONCACAF Champions League | 2011–12 | Quarter-finals | (United States) LA Galaxy | 2–2 | 2–1 | 4–3 | |
| CONCACAF Champions League | 2011–12 | Semi-finals | (Mexico) Santos Laguna | 1–1 | 2–6 | 3–7 | |
| CONCACAF Champions League | 2012–13 | Group stage | (El Salvador) Águila | 5–1 | 3–0 | 2nd | |
| CONCACAF Champions League | 2012–13 | Group stage | (Mexico) Santos Laguna | 1–3 | 0–1 | 2nd | |
| CONCACAF Champions League | 2018 | Round of 16 | (United States) Colorado Rapids | 0–0 | 2–0 | 2–0 | |
| CONCACAF Champions League | 2018 | Quarter-finals | (Mexico) Tigres UANL | 2–1 | 2–3 | 4–4 (a) | |
| CONCACAF Champions League | 2018 | Semi-finals | (Mexico) América | 3–1 | 1–1 | 4–2 | |
| CONCACAF Champions League | 2018 | Final | (Mexico) Guadalajara | 1–2 | 2–1 | 3–3 (2–4 p) | |
| Campeones Cup | 2018 | Final | (Mexico) Tigres UANL | 1–3 | | | |
| CONCACAF Champions League | 2019 | Round of 16 | (Panama) Independiente | 1–1 | 0–4 | 1–5 | |
| CONCACAF Champions League | 2021 | Round of 16 | (Mexico) León | 2–1 | 1–1 | 3–2 | |
| CONCACAF Champions League | 2021 | Quarter-finals | (Mexico) Cruz Azul | 1–3 | 0–1 | 1–4 | |
| Leagues Cup | 2023 | Group stage | (United States) New York City FC | 0–5 | | 3rd | |
| Leagues Cup | 2023 | Group stage | (Mexico) Atlas | 0–1 | | 3rd | |
| Leagues Cup | 2024 | Group stage | (United States) New York Red Bulls | 0–0 (5–4 p) | | 1st | |
| Leagues Cup | 2024 | Group stage | (Mexico) Pachuca | 2–1 | | 1st | |
| Leagues Cup | 2024 | Round of 32 | (United States) Inter Miami CF | 3–4 | | | |

== Awards ==
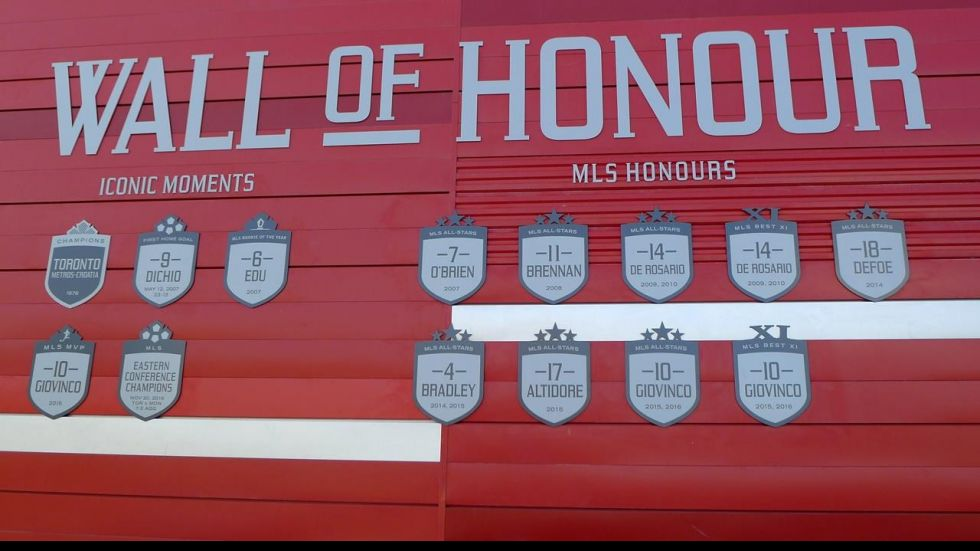
Toronto's "Wall of Honour" also celebrates 1976 NASL champions Toronto Metros-Croatia

- Player of the Month – (Italy) Sebastian Giovinco (July and August, 2015) and (Spain) Alejandro Pozuelo (September, 2020)
- Player of the Week – (Honduras) Amado Guevara (Week 10, 2009), (United States) Chad Barrett (Week 17, 2009), (Canada) Dwayne De Rosario (Weeks 5 and 10, 2010), (Ecuador) Joao Plata (Week 8, 2011), (Netherlands) Danny Koevermans (Week 27, 2011), (Wales) Robert Earnshaw (Week 2, 2013), (United States) Jozy Altidore (Week 1, 2015; Week 27, 2017), (Italy) Sebastian Giovinco (Weeks 13, 14 and 19, 2015; Weeks 20 and 22, 2016; Weeks 8, 21 and 25, 2017), (United States) Justin Morrow (Weeks 23 and 30, 2017), (Spain) Alejandro Pozuelo (Week 8, 2019), (Canada) Richie Laryea (Week 14, 2020), (United States) Michael Bradley (Week 22, 2022) and (Italy) Federico Bernardeschi (Week 15, 2024)
- Goal of the Week – (England) Danny Dichio (Weeks 6, 9 and 29, 2007), (Canada) Jim Brennan (Week 8, 2007), (United States) Chad Barrett (Week 20, 2008), (Jamaica) O'Brian White (Week 26, 2009), (Netherlands) Javier Martina (Week 2, 2011), (Jamaica) Ryan Johnson (Week 2, 2012), (Italy) Sebastian Giovinco (Week 23, 2015), (Spain) Alejandro Pozuelo (Weeks 5 and 8, 2019), (Canada) Jordan Hamilton (Week 15, 2019), (Canada) Richie Laryea (Week 14, 2020), (Italy) Domenico Criscito (Week 26, 2022), (Italy) Federico Bernardeschi (Week 6, 2023), (Italy) Lorenzo Insigne (Weeks 3 and 4, 2024) and (Canada) Luka Gavran (Week 9, 2026)
- Save of the Week – (Switzerland) Stefan Frei (Weeks 15, 24, 25, and 26, 2009; Week 15, 2010 and Week 9, 2011), (Honduras) Amado Guevara (Week 22, 2009), (Serbia) Miloš Kocić (Week 22, 2011) and (United States) Alex Bono (Weeks 17 and 25, 2017)

=== Team of the season ===
- MLS All-Star selection – (Republic of Ireland) Ronnie O'Brien (2007), (Canada) Jim Brennan (2008), (Canada) Dwayne De Rosario (2009 and 2010), (England) Jermain Defoe (2014), (United States) Michael Bradley (2014, 2015 and 2017), (Italy) Sebastian Giovinco (2015, 2016, 2017 and 2018), (United States) Jozy Altidore (2017), (Spain) Alejandro Pozuelo (2019), (Italy) Federico Bernardeschi (2024) and (Canada) Richie Laryea (2026)
- Best XI – (Canada) Dwayne De Rosario (2009 and 2010), (Italy) Sebastian Giovinco (2015, 2016 and 2017), (Spain) Víctor Vázquez (2017), (United States) Justin Morrow (2017) and (Spain) Alejandro Pozuelo (2019 and 2020)

=== Individual ===
- Rookie of the Year – (United States) Maurice Edu (2007)
- Most Valuable Player – (Italy) Sebastian Giovinco (2015) and (Spain) Alejandro Pozuelo (2020)
- Golden Boot – (Italy) Sebastian Giovinco (2015)
- Newcomer of the Year – (Italy) Sebastian Giovinco (2015)
- Coach of the Year – (United States) Greg Vanney (2017)
- MLS Cup Most Valuable Player – (United States) Jozy Altidore (2017)

=== CONCACAF ===
- Coach of the Year – (United States) Greg Vanney (2017)

=== Canadian Championship ===
- George Gross Memorial Trophy – (Canada) Dwayne De Rosario (2009 and 2010), (Ecuador) Joao Plata (2011), (Jamaica) Ryan Johnson (2012), (France) Benoît Cheyrou (2016), (Italy) Sebastian Giovinco (2017) and (Canada) Jonathan Osorio (2018)
- Best Young Canadian Player Award – (Canada) Jacob Shaffelburg (2021)

=== CONCACAF Champions League ===
- Golden Ball – (Italy) Sebastian Giovinco (2018)
- Golden Boot – (Canada) Jonathan Osorio (2018)
- Best XI – (Italy) Sebastian Giovinco (2018) and (Canada) Jonathan Osorio (2018)

=== Front office ===
- Ticket Sales Team of the Year – 2007
- Corporate Partnerships Team of the Year – 2010
- Marketing Executive of the Year – César Velasco (2007)
- Doug Hamilton Executive of the Year – Paul Beirne (2007)
- Team Administrator of the Year – (Canada) Corey Wray (2010)

=== Team ===
- Most Valuable Player – (Canada) Jim Brennan and (Wales) Carl Robinson (co-winners) (2007), (Wales) Carl Robinson (2008), (Canada) Dwayne De Rosario (2009), (Canada) Adrian Cann (2010) and (Ecuador) Joao Plata (2011)
- Golden Boot for team top scorer – (England) Danny Dichio (2007), (United States) Chad Barrett (2008), (Canada) Dwayne De Rosario (2009) and (Canada) Dwayne De Rosario (2010)
- Defender of the Year – (Canada) Jim Brennan (2007), (United States) Marvell Wynne (2008) and (Switzerland) Stefan Frei (2009)
- Humanitarian of the Year – (Canada) Chris Pozniak (2007), (United States) Todd Dunivant (2008), (Canada) Jim Brennan (2009) and (Switzerland) Stefan Frei (2010)
- Supporters' Player of the Year – (Canada) Jim Brennan (2007), (Canada) Greg Sutton (U-Sector) and (Wales) Carl Robinson (Red Patch Boys) (2008), (Canada) Dwayne De Rosario (2009), (Switzerland) Stefan Frei (2010) and (Ecuador) Joao Plata (2011)
