= 2008 Toronto FC season =

Toronto FC 2008 soccer season

Toronto FC
2008 season
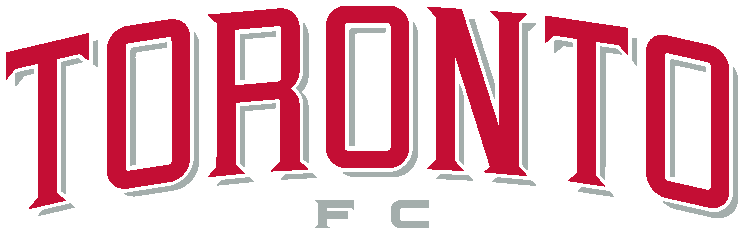
- Head coach: John Carver
- Stadium: BMO Field
- Major League Soccer: Conference: 7th Overall: 12th
- MLS Cup playoffs: Did not qualify
- Canadian Championship: Runners-up
- Top goalscorer: League: Danny Dichio (5); All: Rohan Ricketts (6)
Home colours	Away colours

The 2008 MLS season was the second season in Toronto FC's existence. The club's season began on March 29, 2008, in an away game against the Columbus Crew, which resulted in a 2–0 loss. The club's first goal of the season was scored by Maurice Edu on April 5, 2008, in a 4–1 loss against D.C. United.

== Club ==
=== Management ===
Position	Staff
Head coach	(England) John Carver
Assistant coach	(England) Chris Cummins
Director of soccer	(Scotland) Mo Johnston
Strength and conditioning coach	(England) Paul Winsper
Goalkeeping coach	(Republic of Ireland) Eddie Kehoe
Equipment manager	(England) Malcolm Phillips

Last updated: May 11, 2008
Source: Toronto FC

=== Other information ===
Chairman	(Canada) MLSE
Ground (capacity and dimensions)	BMO Field (20,522 / 75yards x 115yards)

Source: BMO Field article on April 9, 2008

== Squad ==
As of October 26, 2008.

=== First team ===
Note: Flags indicate national team as defined under FIFA eligibility rules; some limited exceptions apply. Players may hold more than one non-FIFA nationality.

No.	Pos.	Nation	Player
1	GK	CAN	Greg Sutton
2	DF	USA	Hunter Freeman
3	DF	TTO	Julius James
4	DF	PUR	Marco Vélez
5	MF	CAN	Kevin Harmse
7	FW	USA	Abdus Ibrahim
9	FW	ENG	Danny Dichio
10	MF	ENG	Rohan Ricketts
11	MF	CAN	Jim Brennan (Captain)
12	DF	USA	Todd Dunivant
14	DF	JAM	Tyrone Marshall
15	MF	CAN	Tyler Rosenlund
16	DF	USA	Marvell Wynne

No.	Pos.	Nation	Player
17	MF	CAN	Joey Melo
18	GK	USA	Brian Edwards
19	FW	USA	Chad Barrett
20	MF	HON	Amado Guevara
23	FW	NZL	Jarrod Smith
25	FW	GUA	Carlos Ruiz
26	FW	CAN	Derek Gaudet
27	MF	CAN	Gabe Gala
28	FW	USA	Johann Smith
29	DF	CAN	Nana Attakora-Gyan
33	MF	WAL	Carl Robinson (Vice-Captain)
36	MF	BER	Kilian Elkinson

=== List of 2008 transfers ===
==== In ====
Note: Flags indicate national team as defined under FIFA eligibility rules; some limited exceptions apply. Players may hold more than one non-FIFA nationality.

No.	Pos.	Nation	Player
3	DF	TTO	Julius James (1st round (9th overall) pick of the 2008 draft)
8	DF	USA	Pat Phelan (1st round (10th overall) pick of the 2008 draft)
18	GK	USA	Brian Edwards (2nd round (28th overall) pick of the 2008 draft)
5	MF	CAN	Kevin Harmse (from Los Angeles Galaxy for 2009 4th round draft pick)
15	MF	CAN	Tyler Rosenlund (signed as a free agent)
23	FW	NZL	Jarrod Smith (signed as a free agent)
4	DF	PUR	Marco Vélez (free transfer from Puerto Rico Islanders)

No.	Pos.	Nation	Player
32	MF	FRA	Laurent Robert (free transfer from Derby County)
20	MF	HON	Amado Guevara (from Chivas USA for 2009 and 2010 draft pick)
10	MF	ENG	Rohan Ricketts (signed as a free agent)
28	DF	CIV	Olivier Tébily (signed as a free agent)
24	MF	CAN	Tyler Hemming (rejoined club under new contract)
7	FW	USA	Abdus Ibrahim (from FC Dallas for pick in 2010 MLS draft)
25	FW	GUA	Carlos Ruiz (from Los Angeles Galaxy for first round pick in 2009 MLS draft and supplemental pick)
2	DF	USA	Hunter Freeman (from New York Red Bull for two supplemental draft picks)

==== Out ====
Note: Flags indicate national team as defined under FIFA eligibility rules; some limited exceptions apply. Players may hold more than one non-FIFA nationality.

No.	Pos.	Nation	Player
13	MF	CAN	Chris Pozniak (picked by San Jose Earthquakes in expansion draft)
3	DF	CAN	Adam Braz (waived)
4	DF	CAN	Marco Reda (waived)
15	MF	CAN	David Guzmán (waived)
18	GK	CAN	Srdjan Djekanović (waived)
23	DF	CAN	Miguel Canizalez (waived)
28	DF	CAN	Stephen Lumley (waived)
26	MF	CAN	Cristian Nuñez (waived)
39	GK	CAN	Kenny Stamatopoulos (loan return to Tromsø IL)
5	MF	IRL	Ronnie O'Brien (to San Jose Earthquakes for 2009 1st Round draft pick)

No.	Pos.	Nation	Player
21	FW	TTO	Collin Samuel (waived)
2	DF	NZL	Andrew Boyens (waived)
24	MF	CAN	Tyler Hemming (waived)
8	DF	USA	Pat Phelan (to New England Revolution)
19	FW	CAN	Andrea Lombardo (waived)
28	DF	CIV	Olivier Tebily (waived)
32	MF	FRA	Laurent Robert (waived)
6	MF	USA	Maurice Edu (to Rangers F.C.)

==== Players out on loan ====
Note: Flags indicate national team as defined under FIFA eligibility rules; some limited exceptions apply. Players may hold more than one non-FIFA nationality.

No.	Pos.	Nation	Player
–	FW	CAN	Jeffrey Gonsalves (at Rhode Island Stingrays)

== Squad statistics ==
Competitive matches only. Numbers in brackets indicate number of games started.
Updated to games played October 26, 2008.

=== Players ===
Number	Position	Name	MLS Regular Season		MLS Cup		Canadian Championship		Total	
Number	Position	Name	Apps	Goals	Apps	Goals	Apps	Goals	Apps	Goals
2	MF	(United States) Hunter Freeman	7 (7)	0	-	-	-	-	7 (7)	0
3	DF	(Trinidad and Tobago) Julius James	14 (11)	1	-	-	3 (1)	0	17 (12)	1
4	DF	(Puerto Rico) Marco Vélez	23 (23)	2	-	-	4 (4)	1	27 (27)	3
5	MF	(Canada) Kevin Harmse	16 (13)	0	-	-	2 (1)	0	18 (14)	0
6	MF	(United States) Maurice Edu^{1}	13 (12)	1	-	-	3 (3)	1	16 (16)	2
7	FW	(United States) Abdus Ibrahim	12 (4)	2	-	-	1 (1)	0	13 (5)	2
9	FW	(England) Danny Dichio	23 (16)	5	-	-	2 (2)	0	25 (18)	5
10	MF	(England) Rohan Ricketts	27 (26)	4	-	-	4 (4)	2	31 (30)	6
11	MF	(Canada) Jim Brennan (C)	28 (27)	1	-	-	3 (3)	0	31 (30)	1
12	DF	(United States) Todd Dunivant	9 (5)	0	-	-	-	-	9 (5)	0
13	MF	(Canada) Rick Titus	1 (1)	0	-	-	-	-	1 (1)	0
14	DF	(Jamaica) Tyrone Marshall	24 (23)	0	-	-	3 (3)	0	27 (26)	0
15	MF	(Canada) Tyler Rosenlund	8 (3)	1	-	-	-	-	8 (3)	1
16	DF	(United States) Marvell Wynne	24 (24)	2	-	-	4 (4)	0	28 (28)	2
17	MF	(Canada) Joey Melo	-	-	-	-	-	-	-	-
19	FW	(Canada) Andrea Lombardo^{1}	1 (0)	0	-	-	-	-	1 (0)	0
19	FW	(United States) Chad Barrett	13 (13)	4	-	-	-	-	13 (13)	4
20	MF	(Honduras) Amado Guevara	21 (20)	4	-	-	3 (3)	0	24 (23)	4
21	FW	(Trinidad and Tobago) Collin Samuel^{1}	1 (1)	0	-	-	-	-	1 (1)	0
23	FW	(New Zealand) Jarrod Smith	19 (5)	1	-	-	2 (0)	0	21 (5)	1
24	MF	(Canada) Tyler Hemming^{2}	3 (1)	0	-	-	-	-	3 (1)	0
25	FW	(Guatemala) Carlos Ruíz	5 (3)	0	-	-	-	-	5 (3)	0
26	MF	(Canada) Derek Gaudet	1 (0)	0	-	-	-	-	1 (0)	0
27	MF	(Canada) Gabe Gala	1 (0)	0	-	-	-	-	1 (0)	-
28	FW	(United States) Johann Smith	10 (3)	0	-	-	-	-	10 (3)	0
28	DF	(Ivory Coast) Olivier Tébily^{1}	4 (3)	0	-	-	1 (1)	0	5 (4)	0
29	DF	(Canada) Nana Attakora-Gyan	5 (3)	0	-	-	-	-	5 (3)	0
32	MF	(France) Laurent Robert^{1}	17 (16)	1	-	-	4 (4)	0	21 (20)	1
33	MF	(Wales) Carl Robinson (VC)	27 (27)	1	-	-	4 (4)	0	31 (31)	1
34	DF	(United States) Tim Regan	1 (1)	0	-	-	-	-	1 (1)	0
35	DF	(Canada) Diaz Kambere	1 (1)	0	-	-	-	-	1 (1)	0
36	MF	(Bermuda) Kilian Elkinson	-	-	-	-	-	-	-	-
96	FW	(United States) Jeff Cunningham^{1}	16 (7)	3	-	-	4 (2)	0	20 (9)	3

=== Goalkeepers ===
Number	Position	Name	MLS Regular Season				MLS Cup				Canadian Championship				Total			
Number	Position	Name	Apps	GA	GAA	CS	Apps	GA	GAA	CS	Apps	GA	GAA	CS	Apps	GA	GAA	CS
1	GK	(Canada) Greg Sutton	24 (24)	35	1.46	6	-	-	-	-	4 (4)	4	1.00	1	28 (28)	39	1.39	7
18	GK	(United States) Brian Edwards	6 (6)	8	1.33	2	-	-	-	-	-	-	-	-	6 (6)	8	1.33	2

^{1}Player is no longer with team
^{2}Left club at start of the season but later rejoined under a new contract
GA = Goals against; GAA = Goals against average; CS = Clean sheets

== Competitions summary ==
Updated to games played October 26, 2008.

=== Pre-season friendlies ===
Texas Pro Soccer Festival

Team	Pts	Pld	W	L	T	GF	GA	GD
Houston Dynamo	7	3	2	0	1	6	4	+2
D.C. United	7	3	2	0	1	4	2	+2
Toronto FC	3	3	1	2	0	6	7	-1
Chivas USA	0	3	0	3	0	3	6	-3

Carolina Challenge Cup

Team	Pts	Pld	W	L	T	GF	GA	GD
San Jose Earthquakes	9	3	3	0	0	6	1	+5
Charleston Battery	4	3	1	1	1	4	3	+1
New York Red Bulls	2	3	0	1	2	2	5	-3
Toronto FC	1	3	0	2	1	1	4	-3

=== Regular season ===
==== Results summary ====
Overall								Home						Away					
Pld	Pts	W	L	T	GF	GA	GD	W	L	T	GF	GA	GD	W	L	T	GF	GA	GD
30	35	9	13	8	34	43	−9	6	2	7	17	12	+5	3	11	1	17	31	−14

Last updated: October 30, 2008
Source: 2008 Major League Soccer season
Pld = Matches played; Pts = Points; W = Matches won; T = Matches tied; L = Matches lost; GF = Goals for; GA = Goals against; GD = Goal difference

==== Results by round ====
Round	1	2	3	4	5	6	7	8	9	10	11	12	13	14	15	16	17	18	19	20	21	22	23	24	25	26	27	28	29	30
Ground	A	A	A	H	H	H	H	H	A	H	A	H	H	A	A	H	A	H	A	A	H	A	H	H	A	H	A	A	H	A
Result	L	L	W	W	W	D	D	W	L	W	L	W	D	L	L	D	L	L	W	L	D	L	L	D	L	D	W	D	W	L

Updated to match(es) played on October 30, 2008. Source: Regular season matches
A = Away; H = Home; W = Win; D = Draw; L = Loss

=== Canadian Championship ===
Team	Pts	Pld	W	D	L	GF	GA	GD
Montreal Impact	7	4	2	1	1	5	2	+3
Toronto FC	5	4	1	2	1	4	4	0
Vancouver Whitecaps FC	4	4	1	1	2	3	6	-3

== Matches ==
Updated to games played October 26, 2008.

=== Legend ===
Win Tie Loss

=== Pre-season ===
==== Friendly matches ====
February 5, 2008	Toronto FC	1–1	D.C. United	Bradenton, Florida
	Danny Dichio 54'		Domenic Mediate 15'

February 11, 2008	Toronto FC	0–0	Odense Boldklub	Bradenton, Florida
		(report)

February 14, 2008	Toronto FC	1–2	Odense Boldklub	Bradenton, Florida
	Andrea Lombardo 80'	(report)	Jonas Borring 37'; Chris Sorensen 60'

February 16, 2008	Toronto FC	2–0	Kansas City Wizards	Bradenton, Florida
	Maurice Edu 44'; Maurice Edu 61'	(report)

February 17, 2008	Toronto FC	3–1	United States U-17	Bradenton, Florida
	Kiki Musampa 24' (pen.); Pat Phelan 87'; Jamie Watson 88'	(report)	Scott Caldwell 12'

February 20, 2008	Toronto FC	1–1	Chicago Fire	Bradenton, Florida
	Jarrod Smith 78'	(report)	Calen Carr 50'

==== 2008 Texas Pro Soccer Festival ====
March 5, 2008	Toronto FC	3–4	Houston Dynamo	Cibolo, Texas
	Kiki Musampa 36'; Martin Brittain 71' (pen.); Tony Vairelles 81'	(report)	Brad Davis 3'; Brian Ching 42'; Brian Ching 44'; Erik Ustruck 47'

March 7, 2008	Toronto FC	0–1	D.C. United	Cibolo, Texas
		(report)	Josh Gardner 84'

March 9, 2008	Toronto FC	3–2	Chivas USA	Cibolo, Texas
	Jeff Cunningham 9'; Danny Dichio 30'; Jeff Cunningham 63' (pen.)	(report)	Kiki Musampa 23' (o.g.); Ante Razov 27'

==== 2008 Carolina Challenge Cup ====
March 15, 2008	Toronto FC	0–1	San Jose Earthquakes	Charleston, South Carolina
		(report)	Jason Hernandez 21'

March 19, 2008	Toronto FC	1–1	New York Red Bulls	Charleston, South Carolina
	Jeff Cunningham 10'		John Wolyniec 74'

March 22, 2008	Toronto FC	0–2	Charleston Battery	Charleston, South Carolina
			Randi Patterson 38'; Randi Patterson 50'

=== Mid-season friendly matches ===
July 5, 2008	Toronto FC	1–1 (a.e.t.) (3–4 p)	Pachuca	Toronto
	Julius James 69'; Kevin Harmse (yellow card) 85'	(report)	Christian 60'	Stadium: BMO Field; Attendance: 18,097; Referee: Silviu Petrescu
	Penalties
	Rohan Ricketts (penalty scored); Laurent Robert (penalty scored); Jim Brennan (penalty missed); Jarrod Smith (penalty scored); Jeff Cunningham (penalty missed); Kevin Harmse (penalty missed)		Leobardo Lopez (penalty scored); Julio Manzur (penalty scored); Carlos Gerardo Rodriguez (penalty scored); Luis Montes (penalty missed); Christian (penalty missed); Edwin Borboa (penalty scored)

July 15, 2008	Toronto FC	0–1	Independiente	Toronto
	Tyler Rosenlund (yellow card) 11'; Maurice Edu (yellow card) 89'	(report)	Emanuel Centurion (yellow card) 9'; Ricardo Moreira (yellow card) 30'; Pablo Vitti 68'; Damian Ledesma (yellow card) 91+'	Stadium: BMO Field; Attendance: 18,741; Referee: Alex Prus

=== 2008 Major League Soccer season ===
March 29, 2008	Columbus Crew	2–0	Toronto FC	Columbus, Ohio, USA
	Frankie Hejduk (yellow card) 10'; Adam Moffat 26'; Alejandro Moreno 76'	(report)	Maurice Edu (yellow card) 55'	Stadium: Columbus Crew Stadium; Attendance: 13,843; Referee: Baldomero Toledo

April 5, 2008	D.C. United	4–1	Toronto FC	Washington, D.C., USA
	Luciano Emilio 2'; Santino Quaranta 5'; Marc Burch (yellow card) 22'; Gonzalo Peralta (yellow card) 32'; Marcelo Gallardo 52'; Jaime Moreno 78'	(report)	Jeff Cunningham (yellow card) 13'; Kevin Harmse (red card) 22'; Maurice Edu (yellow card) 50'; Maurice Edu 88'	Stadium: RFK Stadium; Attendance: 20,161; Referee: Mark Geiger

April 13, 2008	Los Angeles Galaxy	2–3	Toronto FC	Carson, California, USA
	Landon Donovan 43'; Greg Vanney (yellow card) 52'; Landon Donovan 58' (pen.)	(report)	Danny Dichio 42'; Jarrod Smith 53'; Jeff Cunningham 88'	Stadium: The Home Depot Center; Attendance: 20,426; Referee: Alex Prus

April 19, 2008	Toronto FC	1–0	Real Salt Lake	Toronto
	Laurent Robert 31'; Marco Vélez (yellow card) 73'	(report)	Chris Wingert (yellow card) 78'	Stadium: BMO Field; Attendance: 20,219; Referee: Silviu Petrescu

April 26, 2008	Toronto FC	2–0	Kansas City Wizards	Toronto
	Amado Guevara 56'; Amado Guevara 77'	(report)	Jimmy Conrad (yellow card) 56'	Stadium: BMO Field; Attendance: 20,045; Referee: Kevin Stott

May 1, 2008	Toronto FC	1–1	New York Red Bulls	Toronto
	Marco Vélez 22'; Laurent Robert (yellow card) 49'; Amado Guevara (yellow card) 51'	(report)	Dave van den Bergh 39'; Siniša Ubiparipović (yellow card) 70'	Stadium: BMO Field; Attendance: 19,816; Referee: Abiodun Okulaja

May 17, 2008	Toronto FC	0–0	Columbus Crew	Toronto
		(report)	Guillermo Barros Schelotto (yellow card) 90'	Stadium: BMO Field; Attendance: 20,358; Referee: Kevin Stott

May 21, 2008	Toronto FC	1–0	D.C. United	Toronto
	Danny Dichio 7'	(report)	Fred (yellow card) 29'; Santino Quaranta (yellow card) 31'	Stadium: BMO Field; Attendance: 19,971; Referee: Alex Prus

May 24, 2008	D.C. United	3–2	Toronto FC	Washington, D.C., USA
	Gonzalo Peralta 41'; Jaime Moreno 70' (pen.); Luciano Emilio 72'; Devon McTavish (yellow card) 81'; Santino Quaranta (yellow card) 84'	(report)	Danny Dichio 13'; Danny Dichio 46+'; Laurent Robert (yellow card) 62' (red card) 95+'; Amado Guevara (yellow card) 81'	Stadium: RFK Stadium; Attendance: 18,647; Referee: Jorge Gonzalez

May 31, 2008	Toronto FC	2–0	Los Angeles Galaxy	Toronto
	Maurice Edu (yellow card) 37'; Julius James 49'; Kevin Harmse (yellow card) 54'; Jeff Cunningham 65'; Jeff Cunningham (yellow card) 65'	(report)		Stadium: BMO Field; Attendance: 20,096; Referee: Mark Geiger

June 8, 2008	Houston Dynamo	3–1	Toronto FC	Houston, USA
	Dwayne De Rosario 46+'; Brian Ching 52'; Brian Ching 69'; Chris Wondolowski (yellow card) 94+'	(report)	Carl Robinson (yellow card) 53'; Jeff Cunningham 71'	Stadium: Robertson Stadium; Attendance: 13,179; Referee: Terry Vaughn

June 14, 2008	Toronto FC	3–1	Colorado Rapids	Toronto
	Danny Dichio 37'; Rohan Ricketts 58'; Rohan Ricketts 67'	(report)	Christian Gomez 80'	Stadium: BMO Field; Attendance: 20,135; Referee: Jair Marrufo

June 21, 2008	Toronto FC	0–0	Kansas City Wizards	Toronto
	Laurent Robert (yellow card) 92+'	(report)	Jack Jewsbury (yellow card) 5'; Kerry Zavagnin (yellow card) 22'; Kurt Morsink (yellow card) 69'; Roger Espinoza (red card) 93+'	Stadium: BMO Field; Attendance: 20,293; Referee: Michael Kennedy

June 28, 2008	New England Revolution	2–1	Toronto FC	Foxborough, Massachusetts, USA
	Steve Ralston 12'; Steve Ralston 59'	(report)	Laurent Robert (yellow card) 47+'; Maurice Edu (yellow card) 77'; Shalrie Joseph 78' (o.g.); Tyrone Marshall (yellow card) 85'; Amado Guevara (yellow card) 93+'	Stadium: Gillette Stadium; Attendance: 15,863; Referee: Tim Weyland

July 12, 2008	Chicago Fire	2–1	Toronto FC	Bridgeview, Illinois, USA
	Chris Rolfe 6'; John Thorrington (yellow card) 27'; Gonzalo Segares (yellow card) 36'; John Thorrington 92+'	(report)	Maurice Edu (yellow card) 12'; Carl Robinson (yellow card) 53'; Abdus Ibrahim 63'; Abdus Ibrahim (yellow card) 87'	Stadium: Toyota Park; Attendance: 15,118; Referee: Jorge Gonzalez

July 19, 2008	Toronto FC	0–0	San Jose Earthquakes	Toronto
	Abdus Ibrahim (yellow card) 18'	(report)	Jason Hernandez (yellow card) 26'	Stadium: BMO Field; Attendance: 20,264; Referee: Paul Ward

July 28, 2008	Real Salt Lake	2–1	Toronto FC	Salt Lake City, USA
	Jamison Olave 63'; Jamison Olave (yellow card) 83'; Robbie Findley 87'	(report)	Amado Guevara 84'; Abdus Ibrahim (yellow card) 86'; Greg Sutton (yellow card) 87'	Stadium: Rice-Eccles Stadium; Attendance: 12,319; Referee: Kevin Stott

August 3, 2008	Toronto FC	0–2	FC Dallas	Toronto
	Marco Vélez (yellow card) 27' (yellow-red card) 84'; Amado Guevara (red card) 79'; Jim Brennan (yellow card) 81'	(report)	Andre Rocha (yellow card) 57'; Kenny Cooper 81' (pen.); Kenny Cooper 91+'	Stadium: BMO Field; Attendance: 20,247; Referee: Baldomero Toledo

August 9, 2008	Colorado Rapids	0–1	Toronto FC	Commerce City, Colorado, USA
	Terry Cooke (yellow card) 32'; Conor Casey (yellow card) 46+'; Pablo Mastroeni (yellow card) 63'; Colin Clark (yellow card) 70' (yellow-red card) 70'	(report)	Chad Barrett 44'; Greg Sutton (yellow card) 78'; Carl Robinson (yellow card) 81'; Danny Dichio (yellow card) 84'	Stadium: Dick's Sporting Goods Park; Attendance: 11,752; Referee: Richard Heron

August 17, 2008	New York Red Bulls	2–0	Toronto FC	East Rutherford, New Jersey, USA
	Andrew Boyens (yellow card) 33'; Mike Magee 37'; Dave van den Bergh (yellow card) 46+'; Gabriel Cichero (red card) 46'; Juan Pablo Angel 92+'	(report)	Jim Brennan (yellow card) 46+'; Kevin Harmse (yellow card) 52'	Stadium: Giants Stadium; Attendance: 11,119; Referee: Terry Vaughn

August 23, 2008	Toronto FC	1–1	New England Revolution	Toronto
	Chad Barrett 66'	(report)	Taylor Twellman 35'	Stadium: BMO Field; Attendance: 20,461; Referee: Michael Kennedy

August 30, 2008	Chivas USA	2–1	Toronto FC	Carson, California, USA
	Sacha Kljestan (yellow card) 15'; Alecko Eskandarian 20'; Paulo Nagamura (yellow card) 70'; Lawson Vaughn (yellow card) 79'; Atiba Harris (yellow card) 80'; Atiba Harris 94+'	(report)	Jim Brennan 19'; Tyrone Marshall (yellow card) 72'	Stadium: Home Depot Center; Attendance: 12,561; Referee: Jorge Gonzalez

September 6, 2008	Toronto FC	1–3	Chivas USA	Toronto
	Tyler Rosenlund 30'; Marco Vélez (red card) 47+'	(report)	Daniel Paladini (yellow card) 39'; Daniel Paladini 41'; Alecko Eskandarian (red card) 47+'; Jonathan Bornstein 58'; Ante Razov 96+'	Stadium: BMO Field; Attendance: 19,863; Referee: Kevin Stott

September 13, 2008	Toronto FC	1–1	Columbus Crew	Toronto
	Carl Robinson 6'; Danny Dichio (yellow card) 65'	(report)	Pat Noonan 40'; Gino Padula (yellow card) 41'; Chad Marshall (yellow card) 66'	Stadium: BMO Field; Attendance: 19,657; Referee: Ricardo Salazar

September 20, 2008	Kansas City Wizards	2–0	Toronto FC	Kansas City, Kansas, USA
	Davy Arnaud (yellow card) 25'; Tyson Wahl (yellow card) 39'; Jack Jewsbury 63' (pen.); Kevin Souter 79'; Jonathan Leathers (yellow card) 89'; Jack Jewsbury (yellow card) 91+'	(report)	Carl Robinson (yellow card) 61'; Jim Brennan (yellow card) 65'	Stadium: CommunityAmerica Ballpark; Attendance: 8,270; Referee: Baldomero Toledo

September 27, 2008	Toronto FC	1–1	Houston Dynamo	Toronto
	Jim Brennan (yellow card) 9'; Marvell Wynne 73'; Tyrone Marshall (yellow card) 83'	(report)	Hunter Freeman 23' (o.g.)	Stadium: BMO Field; Attendance: 20,074; Referee: Tim Weyland

October 4, 2008	New York Red Bulls	1–3	Toronto FC	East Rutherford, New Jersey, USA
	Juan Pablo Angel (yellow card) 35'; Jorge Rojas (yellow card) 37'; Dane Richards 49'; Jeff Parke (yellow card) 79'; Gabriel Cichero (yellow card) 87'	(report)	Chad Barrett 27'; Kevin Harmse (yellow card) 35'; Chad Barrett (yellow card) 56'; Chad Barrett 65'; Marvell Wynne (yellow card) 79'; Abdus Ibrahim 86'	Stadium: Giants Stadium; Attendance: 13,756; Referee: Ramon Hernandez

October 11, 2008	FC Dallas	2–2	Toronto FC	Frisco, Texas, USA
	Bruno Guarda (yellow card) 15'; Kenny Cooper 34'; Kenny Cooper 93+' (pen.)	(report)	Hunter Freeman (yellow card) 64'; Marco Vélez 72'; Jim Brennan (yellow card) 75'; Marvell Wynne 88'; Tyler Rosenlund (yellow card) 93+'; Andre Rocha (yellow card) 94+'	Stadium: Pizza Hut Park; Attendance: 14,114; Referee: Mark Geiger

October 18, 2008	Toronto FC	3–2	Chicago Fire	Toronto
	Amado Guevara 12'; Rohan Ricketts 18'; Danny Dichio (yellow card) 22'; Hunter Freeman (yellow card) 26'; Amado Guevara (yellow card) 31'; Rohan Ricketts 47+'	(report)	Justin Mapp 25'; Gonzalo Segares (yellow card) 26'; Cuauhtémoc Blanco 59'; Bakary Soumaré (yellow card) 66'	Stadium: BMO Field; Attendance: 20,294; Referee: Jair Marrufo

October 25, 2008	San Jose Earthquakes	2–0	Toronto FC	Santa Clara, California, USA
	Ryan Cochrane 49'; James Riley (yellow card) 74'; Shea Salinas (yellow card) 80'; Shea Salinas 91+' (pen.)	(report)	Tyrone Marshall (yellow card) 80'; Amado Guevara (yellow card) 84'	Stadium: Buck Shaw Stadium; Attendance: 10,526; Referee: Michael Kennedy

=== Canadian Championship ===
May 27, 2008	Montreal Impact	0–1	Toronto FC	Montreal, Quebec, Canada
	Stefano Pesoli (yellow card) 37' (yellow-red card) 52'; Pato Aguilera (yellow card) 62'	(report)	Jim Brennan (yellow card) 32'; Kevin Harmse (yellow card) 50'; Marco Vélez 72'	Stadium: Saputo Stadium; Attendance: 12,083; Referee: Paul Ward

July 1, 2008	Toronto FC	0–1	Vancouver Whitecaps FC	Toronto
	Jim Brennan (yellow card) 11'; Amado Guevara (yellow card) 23'; Jeff Cunningham (yellow card) 81'	(report)	Martin Nash (yellow card) 11'; Martin Nash 36' (pen.); Justin Moose (yellow card) 46+'; Nicholas Addlery (yellow card) 88'	Stadium: BMO Field; Attendance: 18,938; Referee: Steven DePiero

July 9, 2008	Vancouver Whitecaps FC	2–2	Toronto FC	Burnaby, British Columbia, Canada
	Eduardo Sebrango 43'; Steve Kindel (yellow card) 65'; Eduardo Sebrango 86'	(report)	Maurice Edu 61'; Marco Vélez (yellow card) 66'; Rohan Ricketts 76'	Stadium: Swangard Stadium; Attendance: 5,288; Referee: Carol Ann Chénard

July 22, 2008	Toronto FC	1–1	Montreal Impact	Toronto
	Rohan Ricketts 15'	(report)	Roberto Brown 26'; Simon Gatti (yellow card) 38'; Rocco Placentino (yellow card) 39'; Adam Braz (yellow card) 53'; Matt Jordan (yellow card) 73'; Roberto Brown (yellow card) 92+'	Stadium: BMO Field; Attendance: 20,107; Referee: Silviu Petrescu

== Player seasonal records ==
Competitive matches only. Updated to games played October 26, 2008.

=== Top goalscorers ===
Rank	Name	MLS Regular Season	MLS Cup	Canadian Championship	Total
1	(England) Rohan Ricketts	4 (27)	-	2 (4)	6 (31)
2	(England) Danny Dichio	5 (23)	-	0 (2)	5 (25)
3	(United States) Chad Barrett	4 (13)	-	-	4 (13)
3	(Honduras) Amado Guevara	4 (21)	-	0 (3)	4 (24)
5	(United States) Jeff Cunningham	3 (16)	-	0 (4)	3 (20)
5	(Puerto Rico) Marco Vélez	2 (23)	-	1 (4)	3 (27)
7	(United States) Abdus Ibrahim	2 (12)	-	0 (1)	2 (13)
7	(United States) Maurice Edu	1 (13)	-	1 (3)	2 (16)
7	(United States) Marvell Wynne	2 (24)	-	0 (4)	2 (28)
10	(Canada) Tyler Rosenlund	1 (8)	-	-	1 (8)
10	(Trinidad and Tobago) Julius James	1 (14)	-	0 (3)	1 (17)
10	(France) Laurent Robert	1 (17)	-	0 (4)	1 (21)
10	(New Zealand) Jarrod Smith	1 (19)	-	0 (2)	1 (21)
10	(Wales) Carl Robinson	1 (27)	-	0 (4)	1 (31)
10	(Canada) Jim Brennan	1 (28)	-	0 (3)	1 (31)

=== Goals conceded ===
Rank	Name	MLS Regular Season	MLS Cup	Canadian Championship	Total	Average per game
1	(United States) Brian Edwards	8 (6)	-	-	8 (6)	1.33
2	(Canada) Greg Sutton	35 (24)	-	4 (4)	39 (28)	1.39

=== Discipline ===
Rank	Name	MLS Regular Season		MLS Cup		Canadian Championship		Total		
Rank	Name	Yellow card	Red card	Yellow card	Red card	Yellow card	Red card	Yellow card	Red card	Total Cards
1	(Honduras) Amado Guevara	5	1	-	-	1	0	6	1	7
1	(Canada) Jim Brennan	5	0	-	-	2	0	7	0	7
3	(Puerto Rico) Marco Vélez	3	2	-	-	1	0	4	2	6
3	(Canada) Kevin Harmse	4	1	-	-	1	0	5	1	6
5	(United States) Maurice Edu	5	0	-	-	-	-	5	0	5
5	(France) Laurent Robert	4	1	-	-	-	-	4	1	5
7	(England) Danny Dichio	4	0	-	-	-	-	4	0	4
7	(Jamaica) Tyrone Marshall	4	0	-	-	-	-	4	0	4
7	(Wales) Carl Robinson	4	0	-	-	-	-	4	0	4
7	(United States) Jeff Cunningham	3	0	-	-	1	0	4	0	4
11	(United States) Abdus Ibrahim	3	0	-	-	-	-	3	0	3
12	(United States) Hunter Freeman	2	0	-	-	-	-	2	0	2
13	(United States) Chad Barrett	1	0	-	-	-	-	1	0	1
13	(Canada) Tyler Rosenlund	1	0	-	-	-	-	1	0	1
13	(United States) Marvell Wynne	1	0	-	-	-	-	1	0	1

== Club seasonal records ==
Updated to games played October 26, 2008.

=== Matches ===
Season record wins

- Record win: 2–0 (v. Kansas City Wizards, April 26, 2008)
- Record away win: 3–1 (v. New York Red Bull, October 4, 2008)

Season record defeats

- Record defeat: 4–1 (v. D.C. United, April 5, 2008)
- Record home defeat: 3–1 (v. Chivas USA, September 6, 2008)

Season record draws

- Highest scoring home draw: 1–1 (v. New York Red Bulls, May 1, 2008)
- Highest scoring away draw: 2–2 (v. FC Dallas, October 11, 2008)

=== Sequences ===
- Most consecutive wins: 3 (April 13, 2008 – May 1, 2008)
- Most consecutive draws: 2 (May 1, 2008 – May 17, 2008)
- Most consecutive losses: 2 (March 29, 2008 – April 13, 2008)
- Most consecutive matches unbeaten: 6 (April 13, 2008 – May 24, 2008)
- Most consecutive matches winless: 7 (August 17, 2008 – October 4, 2008)

=== Attendance ===
- Highest home attendance: 20, 461 (v. New England Revolution, August 23, 2008)
- Lowest home attendance: 19, 657 (v. Columbus Crew, September 13, 2008)
- Average league attendance: 20,241
