= Texas Pro Soccer Festival 2008 =

Tournament details
- Host country: United States
- Dates: March 3 - March 9
- Teams: 4

Final positions
- Champions: Houston Dynamo (1st title)

Tournament statistics
- Matches played: 6
- Goals scored: 19 (3.17 per match)
- Top scorer(s): Cezar, Brian Ching, Jeff Cunningham (2 Goals)

The 2008 Texas Pro Soccer Festival held in San Antonio, Texas, was a four-team round robin pre-season competition hosted by the San Antonio Metropolitan Youth Soccer Institute (SAMYS) , a 501 (c)3 nonprofit charity cofounded by Dr. Edward P. Sakiewicz. The event was organized in cooperation and assistance with the Houston Dynamo under the leadership of Chris Canetti, President of Business Operations.

The Dynamo were a large part of assisting SAMYS as a week-long pre-season training camp. 2008 marked the first year that the Dynamo hosted a pre-season tournament in cooperation with SAMYS. The participating MLS teams trained daily at Pepsi Soccer, TX, the facility developed by SAMYS in Schertz, Texas. The teams competed amongst each other in double-header exhibition matches at Steele Stadium in Cibolo, Texas.

The 2008 Texas Pro Soccer Festival also featured a celebrity game, played during the day between the 2nd and 3rd matchdays. The celebrities who appeared included Ethan Zohn and Jenna Morasca of Survivor fame, as well as Anthony LaPaglia and Eric Wynalda., Thoma Rongen, Carlos and Gabe Garcia (formerly D.C. United). and other players such as Marcello Balboa, Preki and others.

== Participating teams and Results ==
Team	Pts	Pld	W	L	T	GF	GA	GD
Houston Dynamo	7	3	2	0	1	6	4	+2
D.C. United	7	3	2	0	1	4	2	+2
Toronto FC	3	3	1	2	0	6	7	-1
Chivas USA	0	3	0	3	0	3	6	-3

== Matches ==
2008-03-05
18:00 CST

Houston Dynamo	4 – 3	Toronto FC
C. Wondolowski 3'; Ching 42' 44'; Ustruck 47'	(Report)	Musampa 36'; Brittain 71'; Vairelles 81'

Steele Stadium, Cibolo Texas
2008-03-05
20:30 CST

D.C. United	2 – 1	Chivas USA
Kirk 16'; Cezar 27'	(Report)	Flores 13'

Steele Stadium, Cibolo Texas

2008-03-07
18:00 CST

D.C. United	1 – 0	Toronto FC
Gardner 84'	(Report)

Steele Stadium, Cibolo Texas
2008-03-07
20:30 CST

Houston Dynamo	1 – 0	Chivas USA
DeRosario 12'	(Report)

Steele Stadium, Cibolo Texas

2008-03-09
12:30 CST

D.C. United	1 – 1	Houston Dynamo
Cezar 78'	(Report)	Caraccio 53'

Steele Stadium, Cibolo Texas
2008-03-09

Chivas USA	2 – 3	Toronto FC
Musampa 23' (o.g); Razov 27'	(Report)	Cunningham 9' 63'; Dichio 30'

Steele Stadium, Cibolo Texas

== Scorers ==
2 goals

- Cezar (D.C. United)
- Brian Ching (Houston Dynamo)
- Jeff Cunningham (Toronto FC)

1 goal

- Martin Brittain (Toronto FC)
- Franco Caraccio (Houston Dynamo)
- Dwayne DeRosario (Houston Dynamo)
- Danny Dichio (Toronto FC)
- Jorge Flores (Chivas USA)
- Josh Gardner (D.C. United)
- Quavas Kirk (D.C. United)
- Kiki Musampa (Toronto FC)
- Ante Razov (Chivas USA)
- Erik Ustruck (Houston Dynamo)
- Tony Vairelles (Toronto FC)
- Chris Wondolowski (Houston Dynamo)

Own Goals

- Kiki Musampa (Toronto FC, playing against Chivas USA)
