= Bulletproof Heart (film) =

1994 film directed by Mark Malone

- Film poster
- Directed by: Mark Malone
- Written by: Gordon Melbourne
- Produced by: William Vince
- Starring: Anthony LaPaglia; Mimi Rogers
- Cinematography: Tobias A. Schliessler
- Music by: Graeme Coleman
- Production company: Republic Pictures
- Distributed by: Keystone Film Company
- Release dates: September 1994 (Toronto International Film Festival); March 31, 1995
- Running time: 95 minutes
- Country: Canada
- Language: English

Bulletproof Heart (also known as Killer) is a 1995 independent Canadian-American neo-noir film directed by Mark Malone. It stars Anthony LaPaglia and Mimi Rogers, alongside a supporting cast featuring Matt Craven, Peter Boyle, Monika Schnarre, Joseph Maher, and Mark Acheson.

The film first premiered at the Toronto International Film Festival and Houston International Festival in 1994, and was later released to the United States and the United Kingdom in 1995.

The story concerns a professional assassin Anthony LaPaglia who is pressured into accepting a new assignment as a favour to his boss Peter Boyle. He later finds himself in a dismal situation with dire consequences for everyone involved.

== Cast ==
- Anthony LaPaglia as Mick
- Mimi Rogers as Fiona
- Matt Craven as Archie
- Peter Boyle as George
- Monika Schnarre as Laura
- Joseph Maher as Dr. Alstricht
- Mark Acheson as Hellbig

== Plot ==
The events of the film take place over the course of one night. The storyline follows Mick (Anthony LaPaglia), a cold-blooded, disinterested, existential hitman who is assigned the task of killing a woman that has stiffed Mick's boss George (Peter Boyle) $650,000. At first Mick is reluctant in accepting the job, but is later assured by George that the job will be easy, as the woman has accepted her fate.

After accepting the job, Mick's friend Archie (Matt Craven) begs to accompany him. Mick hesitates because Archie previously made a mistake in the last job and nearly cost George and Mick their lives. After much discussion, Mick accepts Archie's company.

When Mick arrives at the woman's house, he finds Fiona (Mimi Rogers) is expecting him. She ushers her guests from the party she is hosting, and invites Mick inside. Fiona's cool demeanour both surprises and impresses Mick. She soon has Mick tied to her bed, where the two engage in sadistic intercourse. Mick finds the pain Fiona inflicts on him arousing, and her ability to pleasure him is incomparable to other women Mick has slept with. As the two are dressing, Fiona dismisses Mick's performance, and they head downstairs to where Archie is waiting for them.

The more time they spend together, the less Mick is willing to kill Fiona. Feeling conflicted, Mick calls George demanding the severity of Fiona's crime and questioning the need for the hit. Ending his phone call with George, he returns to the car determined to finish the job, but with no rush.

Fiona suggests the three grab Chinese food, and head to the cemetery for a picnic. There, Fiona experiences a psychotic episode, and falls into a schizophrenic state. Mick rushes Fiona to a psychiatrist (Joseph Maher), who informs Mick that Fiona has an incurable mental illness that will most certainly soon destroy her. Torn, Mick takes Fiona to the shipping docks to finish the job, but finds he cannot bring himself to carry through.

When George arrives, he and Mick begin to argue once more over the need to complete the job. As the two are arguing, Fiona convinces Archie to kill her. Mick is left devastated.

== Soundtrack ==
1. "Love Is All Around" by Reg Preseley
2. "Sanctuary" by A. Ducharme
3. "Fall to Grace" by A. Ducharme and G. Coleman

== Release ==
Bulletproof Heart was selected to play in the 1994 Toronto International Film Festival and Houston International Festival. The film later opened to majority of the United States on March 31, 1995, and was later released to New York on April 7, 1995. The United Kingdom was the last place the movie was released to, on June 9, 1995.

In Canada, the film was distributed by Norstar Entertainment, whereas in the United States it was distributed by Republic Pictures Home Video.

== Reception ==
=== Box office ===
Bulletproof Heart opened in theatres on March 31, 1995, and left theatres on July 27, 1995.

=== Critical response ===
The film received mixed reviews. Many critics describe the film as being "well received by critics, but [failing] to find the audience until it was [later] released on video". Others describe the film as "[striking] the right balance between theatrical and cinematic".

Rotten Tomatoes reports 8 users gave the film a 63% rating, with an average rating of 3/5.

Roger Ebert of the Chicago Sun-Times described Bulletproof Heart as a movie that is "thoughtful, surprising, and haunting" and rated the movie a 3/4.
