= Alex Weed =

American actor (born 1980)

- Born: Alexander Wilding Weed; May 11, 1980 (age 46); Menlo Park, California
- Years active: 1999–present
- Spouse: Fiona Gubelmann
- Website: www.alexweed.com

Alexander Wilding Weed (born May 11, 1980) is an American actor. He is perhaps best known for his guest-starring roles in several TV shows, including Criminal Minds, Pretty Little Liars, Gilmore Girls, House, and House Hunters Renovation.

== Life and career ==
Weed has guest-starred on several TV shows. For instance, he played serial killer Travis James in episode 7.07 of Criminal Minds, titled "There's No Place Like Home". He also played the role of Luke on the web comedy series Suck and Moan, which relates the story of a zombie apocalypse through the perspective of a vampire community.

He is married to Fiona Gubelmann, with whom he costarred in the 2005 film Horror High.

In 2014, he and his wife were featured in an episode of the House Hunters spin-off House Hunters Renovation where they were shown buying and renovating a home.

== Filmography ==
Year	Production	Role	Notes
2019	The Magicians	Gordy Weitzer	3 Episodes
2012	Man Up!	Karl	
2012	Overnight	Fan #2	
2012	Pretty Little Liars	Jonah	2 Episodes
2012	CSI: NY	Scott Perfito	1 Episode
2010–2011	Suck and Moan	Luke	6 Episodes
2011	Criminal Minds	Travis James	1 Episode
2011	Victorious	Jack	1 Episode
2011	Criminal Minds: Suspect Behavior	Hank	1 Episode
2010	Bones	Johnny Wizard	1 Episode
2009	Mental	Brian Jennings	1 Episode
2009	Penance	Bachelor Party Guy #3	
2008	The Double Born	Tommy	
2007	House	Ian	1 Episode
2007	Big Shots	Hooded Guy	1 Episode
2007	Dirt	Addict	1 Episode
2006	The War at Home	Jay	1 Episode
2006	The Pumpkin Karver	Spinner	
2006	The Truth and Nothing But the Truth	Mitchell	short
2005	Horror High	Jimmy	
2005	Malcolm in the Middle	Karl	1 Episode
2005	That's So Raven	Reg	1 Episode
2004	Gilmore Girls	Len	1 Episode
2004	Honeybunny		short
2004	NCIS	Johnny	1 Episode
2004	Mix	Mitch Banko	
2002	Stalemate	Lil' Ricky	
1999	Frezno Smooth	Stoner Punk	
