= Gbenga Akinnagbe =

American actor and writer

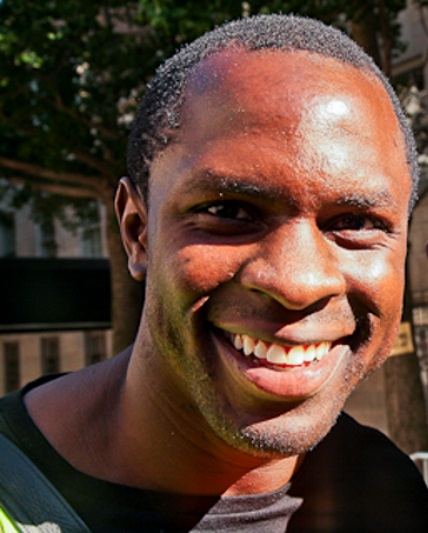
- Akinnagbe in 2012
- Born: Olugbenga Enitan Temitope Akinnagbe; December 12, 1978 (age 47); Washington, D.C., U.S.
- Occupations: Actor; writer
- Years active: 1999–present
- Relatives: Wale (cousin)

Olugbenga Enitan Temitope Akinnagbe (/ˈbɛŋɡə əˈkiːnəbeɪ/ BENG-gə ə-KEEN-ə-bay, Yoruba pronunciation; born December 12, 1978) is an American actor and writer, best known for his roles as Chris Partlow on the TV series The Wire and as Larry Brown on the series The Deuce, both from HBO.

== Early life ==
Akinnagbe was born in Washington, D.C., the son of Yoruba Nigerian parents, and was raised in Silver Spring, Maryland. He is the second oldest of six children, with one older sister and four younger brothers, and the first in his family to be born in the United States. He attended Colonel Zadok A. Magruder High School in Rockville, Maryland. He attended Bucknell University on a wrestling scholarship, and graduated in 2000 with a degree in Political Science and English. Akinnagbe's cousin is rapper Wale.

== Career ==
Akinnagbe played Ben Ellis in the episode "Contenders" on the TV series Numb3rs. In the summer of 2006, Akinnagbe performed the role of "Zim" in the NYC Fringe Festival's "Outstanding Play" award-winning production of Modern Missionary. In 2003, Akinnagbe auditioned for the role of Chris Partlow on the HBO series The Wire and starting in 2004 began a frequent recurring role. In 2008, during the show's fifth and final season, he was promoted to a series regular.

In 2007, Akinnagbe appeared in the film The Savages with Philip Seymour Hoffman, Laura Linney, and Philip Bosco. He appeared in the remake of The Taking of Pelham One Two Three, which was released by Sony in June 2009. Akinnagbe made a guest appearance on a season 10 Law & Order: Special Victims Unit episode entitled Hell as Elijah Okello, a former Ugandan child soldier living in New York, facing deportation. Akinnagbe's former The Wire castmate Robert Wisdom also appeared in that episode as Father Theo Burdett. In 2010, in Seattle, Washington Akinnagbe starred in the world premiere play The Thin Place at The Intiman Theatre.

He was in the movie Lottery Ticket and appeared on The Good Wife as Pastor Isiah Easton. His former co-star from The Wire, Frankie Faison, portrayed his father on The Good Wife in several episodes. He also appeared as Kelly Slater, a nurse in the third season of the Showtime series Nurse Jackie.

He starred in leading roles in two independent films, as Jack in Home, directed by Jono Oliver, and as James in Big Words, directed by Neil Drumming. He appeared as a drug lord in the USA series Graceland and starred as Tom in The Following. He also starred as CIA Agent Erik Ritter in 24: Live Another Day. In October 2016, he began shooting the feature film Starbright.

In March 2020, Akinnagbe was cast in The Old Man.

== Other ventures ==
Akinnagbe is the owner of Enitan, a Brooklyn-based furniture business, where he designs vintage furniture with Dutch wax-resist fabrics that are a fashion staple in West Africa.

== Personal life ==
Gbenga has had two articles published in The New York Times, one detailing a trip to Nepal to climb the Himalayas, and the other outlining the medical procedures he underwent to correct his severely flat feet.

Akinnagbe filed a criminal complaint alleging that journalist Lola Adesioye grabbed his buttocks on two occasions in 2020. Adesioye was arrested on May 26, 2021, jailed for 28 hours, and charged with forcible touching, sexual abuse, and harassment. Her attorney described Akinnagbe's allegations as "a blatant, brazen lie". In October 2021, the case was dismissed.

== Filmography ==
=== Film ===
Year	Title	Role	Notes
2005	They're Made Out of Meat	Merlin	Short
2007	The Savages	Jimmy	
2007	Man-Up	Q	Short
2009	The Taking of Pelham 123	Wallace	
2010	Edge of Darkness	Darcy Jones	
2010	Lottery Ticket	Lorenzo	
2011	Red & Blue Marbles	Cabal	
2012	Overnight	TMJ	
2012	Paranormal Abduction	Alex Chandler	
2013	Big Words	James	
2013	Home	Jack Hall	
2013	Sweet, Sweet Country	Ernesto	Short
2014	Render to Caesar	Dipo	
2014	Fort Bliss	Sgt. Butcher	
2014	Mall	Michel	
2014	Phantom Halo	Roman	
2015	Knucklehead	Langston	
2016	Detour	Michael	
2016	Independence Day: Resurgence	Agent Travis	
2017	Crown Heights	Sampson	
2017	Detroit	Aubrey Pollard Sr.	
2017	Mindhack	Sun Moon	
2017	Heart, Baby	George	
2018	Egg	Wayne	
2018	All the Devil's Men	Samuelson	
2019	Goldie	Richard	
2019	Rogers and Tilden	Marcus	Short
2019	DC Noir	Detective Mitch Brooks	
2019	The Sun Is Also a Star	Samuel Kingsley	
2020	16 Bars	Deacon	
2020	Pitch Black Panacea	Carl (voice)	Short
2021	Passing	Dave Freedland	
2023	Asphalt City	Verdis	
2023	Fast Charlie	Beggar Mercado	
2024	Rob Peace	Carl Robertson	
2024	The Thicket	Eustace Howard	
2025	A House of Dynamite	Major General Steven Kyle	
2026	Starbright	Strange	
2026	The Social Reckoning	Andy	
TBA	Dreams of the Moon †	TBA	Post-production

=== Television ===
Year	Title	Role	Notes
2004–08	The Wire	Chris Partlow	Recurring cast (seasons 3–4), main cast (season 5)
2005	Barbershop	Yinka	Main cast
2006	Conviction	Gary Wade/Calvin	2 episodes
2007	Numb3rs	Ben Ellis	Episode: "Contenders"
2008	Cold Case	Victor Nash '05/'08	Episode: "Street Money"
2009	Fringe	Akim	Episode: "The No-Brainer"
2009	Law & Order: Special Victims Unit	Elijah Okello	Episode: "Hell"
2009	Dark Blue	Dante Rollings	Episode: "August"
2009	Maggie Hill	Elliot Springer	TV movie
2010–15	The Good Wife	Pastor Isaiah Easton	Recurring cast (seasons 1–2, 5)
2011	Blue Bloods	Pierre	Episode: "All That Glitters"
2011	Chase	John Macon	Episode: "The Man at the Altar"
2011	Brooklyn Shakara	Emeka Nwandu	Episode: "Pilot"
2011	A Gifted Man	Dr. Leo 'Bax' Baxter	2 episodes
2011–12	Nurse Jackie	Kelly Slater	Recurring cast (seasons 3–4)
2012	The Unknown	Vincent	Episode: "Life Sentence"
2012	Damages	Walid Cooper	Recurring cast (season 5)
2012	Elementary	Jeremy Lopez	Episode: "The Leviathan"
2012–14	Law & Order: Special Victims Unit	Father Biobaku	2 episodes
2013	Graceland	Jeremiah Bello	Recurring cast (season 1)
2013	The Funtime Gang	Inmate	TV movie
2014	24: Live Another Day	Erik Ritter	Main cast
2015	The Following	Tom Reyes	Recurring cast (season 3)
2015–16	Limitless	Quentin Walker	2 episodes
2016	Madam Secretary	Chris Santumari	Episode: "Desperate Remedies"
2017	Mercy Street	Saga	Episode: "House of Bondage"
2017–18	The Deuce	Larry Brown	Main cast
2020	Evil	Lando Mutabazi	Episode: "Justice x 2"
2021	FBI: Most Wanted	James Johnson	Episode: "Criminal Justice"
2021	Modern Love	Jordan	Episode: "The Night Girl Finds a Day Boy"
2021–23	Wu-Tang: An American Saga	Mook	Recurring cast (season 2–3)
2022	The Blacklist	Boukman Baptiste	Episode: "Boukman Baptiste (No. 164)"
2022–24	The Old Man	Julian Carson	Main cast
2023	Power Book II: Ghost	Ron Samuel Jenkins	Recurring cast (season 3)
2024	Genius	Earl Little	Episode: "Graduation"

=== Theater ===
Year	Title	Role	Notes
2001	The Oedipus Plays	Soldier	
2002	Romeo and Juliet	Ensemble	
2002	Cyrano de Bergerac	Le Bret	
2003	Henry V	A French Messenger	
2005	The Controversy of Valladolid	A Black Servant	
2006	Modern Missionary	Zim	
2007	A View From 151st Street	Dwight	
2008	Lower Ninth	Lowboy	
2010	A Thin Place	Isaac	
2013	The Rainmaker	Bill Starbuck	
2015	Fulfillment	Michael	
2018	To Kill a Mockingbird	Tom Robinson	
