= Dead Heat (2002 film) =

- Theatrical release poster
- Directed by: Mark Malone
- Written by: Mark Malone
- Produced by: Charles Martin Smith; Michael Paseornek
- Starring: Kiefer Sutherland; Anthony LaPaglia; Radha Mitchell; Lothaire Bluteau
- Cinematography: Ross W. Clarkson
- Edited by: Alison Grace
- Music by: Patric Caird
- Production companies: Cinerenta; Lions Gate Films
- Distributed by: Boulevard Entertainment
- Release date: July 23, 2002 (DVD)
- Running time: 94 minutes
- Countries: Canada; Germany

Dead Heat is a 2002 crime comedy-drama film starring Kiefer Sutherland, Anthony LaPaglia and Radha Mitchell. It was written and directed by Mark Malone.

== Plot ==
Situated in Boston, Albert Paul 'Pally' LaMarr (Kiefer Sutherland) is a 35 year old police officer who has recently suffered a heart attack while facing a bandit, forcing him into retirement. The loss of his career created a void that drove him into depression and left him contemplating suicide. His wife, Charlotte LaMarr (Radha Mitchell) calls Pally's half-brother Ray LaMarr (Anthony LaPaglia) to come and visit him with the intention of bringing his spirits up. Ray is a small time crook and he convinces Pally to finance a long-shot race horse. Unknowingly, Pally becomes in over his head as Ray's new found jockey Tony LaRoche (Lothaire Bluteau) is a gambling addict who is in debt with a Mob kingpin Frank Finnegan (Daniel Benzali). Ray and Pally become guilty by association and Tony's debt is now theirs. Pally finds himself mired in murder, mobsters and misfired romance. The stakes of their new horse panning out just increase substantially.

== Cast ==
- Kiefer Sutherland as Albert Paul "Pally" LaMarr, an ex-detective for the Boston Police
- Anthony LaPaglia as Ray LaMarr, Pally's small-time crook brother
- Radha Mitchell as Charlotte LaMarr, Pally's ex-wife
- Lothaire Bluteau as Tony LaRoche, a jockey with a bad gambling habit
- Daniel Benzali as Frank Finnegan, an Irish Mob boss in Boston
- Kay Panabaker as Samantha "Sam" LaRoche, Tony's young daughter
- Denis Arndt as Dr. Ivan Barnes
- Alf Humphreys as Dr. Marchesi
- Charles Martin Smith as Morty
- Gary Hetherington as Captain
- Michael Benyaer as Warehouse Worker #1
- Craig Veroni as Warehouse Worker #2
- Mark Acheson as Warehouse Worker #5
- Frank Cassini as Manny
- Peter Flemming as Ted
- Gerald Paetz as Finnegan's Thug #1
- Bruce Fontaine as Finnegan's Thug #2

== Production ==
The film used locations in Victoria and Vancouver, British Columbia. It was Sutherland's last production before his TV show, 24.

== Awards and nominations ==
The film received two nominations in the DVD Exclusive Awards in 2003, one for Best Cinematography and for Kiefer Sutherland for Best Actor.

== See also ==
- List of films about horses
