= Happy Hour (2003 film) =

- Directed by: Mike Bencivenga
- Written by: Mike Bencivenga; Richard Levine
- Story by: Richard Levine
- Produced by: J. Todd Harris; Eric M. Klein; Kimberly Shane O'Hara
- Starring: Anthony LaPaglia; Eric Stoltz
- Cinematography: Giselle Chamma
- Edited by: Nina Kawasaki; Robert Landau
- Music by: Jeffrey M. Taylor
- Production company: Davis Entertainment Filmworks
- Distributed by: O'Hara/Klein Releasing
- Release date: April 10, 2003 (Sonooma)
- Running time: 93 minutes
- Country: United States
- Language: English

Happy Hour is a 2003 American comedy drama film starring Anthony LaPaglia and Eric Stoltz.

== Cast ==
- Anthony LaPaglia as Tulley
- Eric Stoltz as Levine
- Caroleen Feeney as Natalie
- Robert Vaughn as Tulley Sr.
- Sandrine Holt as Bonnie
- Thomas Sadoski as Scott
- Jack Newfield as himself
- Pete Hamill as himself
- Bob O'Brien as himself
- Steve Dunleavy as himself

== Reception ==
The film has a 38% rating on Rotten Tomatoes. Ed Gonzalez of Slant Magazine awarded the film one and half stars out of four.
