= Overnight (2012 film) =

- Directed by: Valerie Breiman
- Written by: Valerie Breiman
- Produced by: Daniel Grodnik; Michael Gruskoff; Zack Norman; Michael Viner
- Starring: James D'Arcy; Rachel Blanchard; Anthony LaPaglia; Gbenga Akinnagbe; Maz Jobrani; Mousa Kraish
- Cinematography: Bruce Douglas Johnson
- Edited by: Amy E. Duddleston
- Music by: Alex Wurman
- Production company: Red Eye Productions
- Distributed by: Westchester Films
- Release date: 20 April 2012
- Running time: 95 minutes
- Country: United States
- Language: English

Overnight is a 2012 American romantic comedy film directed by Valerie Breiman, starring James D'Arcy, Rachel Blanchard, Anthony LaPaglia, Gbenga Akinnagbe, Maz Jobrani and Mousa Kraish.

== Cast ==
- James D'Arcy as Jenny
- Rachel Blanchard as Tom
- Anthony LaPaglia as Tully
- Gbenga Akinnagbe as TMJ
- Maz Jobrani as Amir
- Mousa Kraish as Mohammed
- Josh Braaten as Derek
- Christina Chang as Lisa
- Claudia Christian as Sandy
- Tom Hodges
- Sufe Bradshaw as Shawna
- Christopher Carrington as Bodyguard
- Kyle Davis as Bully on Airplane
- Priscilla Garita as Security
- Jared S. Gilmore as Kyle
- Shishir Kurup as Taxi Driver
- Euriamis Losada as Officer Stephens
- Kevin Rahm as Chip
- Jack Salvatore Jr. as Kid #1
- Lauren Stamile as Abby
- Alex Weed as Fan #2

== Release ==
The film was released on 20 April 2012.

== Reception ==
Connie Ogle of the Miami Herald called the film a "witless waste of time, more likely to make you reach for an airsickness bag than make you laugh."

Jeff Shannon of The Seattle Times called the film "Formulaic to a fault and painfully unfunny".

Brian Miller of the New Times Broward-Palm Beach called the film "boring".
