= Anthony LaPaglia =

Australian actor (born 1959)

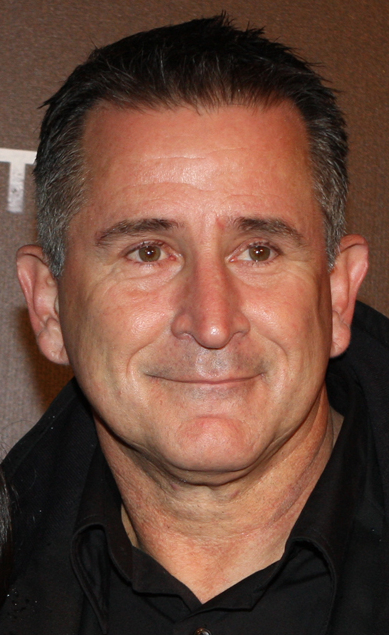
- LaPaglia in 2013
- Born: 31 January 1959 (age 67); Adelaide, South Australia, Australia
- Occupation: Actor
- Years active: 1976–present
- Spouse(s): Cherie Michan (divorced) Gia Carides (m. 1998; div. 2015) Alexandra Henkel (m. 2018; div. 2025)
- Children: 1
- Relatives: Jonathan LaPaglia (brother)

Anthony LaPaglia (/ləˈpɑːliə/ lə-PAH-lee-ə, Italian: [laˈpaʎʎa]; born 31 January 1959) is an Australian actor. Known for his roles on stage and screen he has received several accolades including three AACTA Awards, a Primetime Emmy Award, and a Tony Award.

For his starring role as Jack Malone on the American television crime drama series Without a Trace (2002–09), he received a Golden Globe Award in 2004. For his role as Simon Moon on the NBC sitcom Frasier (2000–04) he won the Primetime Emmy Award. On stage, he starred in the 1997 Broadway revival of the Arthur Miller play A View from the Bridge for which he won the Tony Award for Best Actor in a Play.

He has won three AACTA Awards, Best Actor in a Leading Role for Lantana (2001) and Balibo (2009), and Best Actor in a Supporting Role for Nitram (2021). He acted in many feature and TV films, among them So I Married an Axe Murderer (1993), Empire Records (1995), Sweet and Lowdown (1999), and Road to Perdition (2002). He voiced a skua in Happy Feet (2006) and its 2011 sequel.

== Early life and education ==
LaPaglia was born in Adelaide, South Australia, the son of Maria Johannes (née Brendel), a secretary and model, and Egidio "Eddie" LaPaglia, an auto mechanic and car dealer. LaPaglia's mother was Dutch, and his father emigrated from Bovalino, Calabria, Italy, at the age of eighteen. His younger brother, Jonathan LaPaglia, is also an actor, and his other brother, Michael, is a car wholesaler in Los Angeles. LaPaglia attended Rostrevor College and Norwood High School.

LaPaglia was working in Adelaide as a shoe salesman for Florsheim Shoes in the early 1980s. He asked to be transferred to the US and continued working there while studying acting as he was rejected by the prestigious Sydney drama school NIDA. LaPaglia first began his venture into dramatic art in his late teens, when he enrolled in an acting course at the South Australian Castings Agency (SA Castings) in Adelaide. The two-and-half-year course was to be supplemented with a further three months, which would have included a "boot camp" and a trial listing with SA Castings. After completing one-and-a-half years of the course, LaPaglia left Adelaide for Los Angeles.

== Career ==
LaPaglia's earliest credit was a 1985 part in an episode of the television series Steven Spielberg's Amazing Stories. His first feature film was Cold Steel in 1987, followed that same year by the title role of Frank Nitti in the telemovie Nitti: The Enforcer. LaPaglia had a supporting role as a mobster in the minor hit Betsy's Wedding (1990).

He starred alongside Danny Aiello and Lainie Kazan in 29th Street, a fact-based comedy/bio-pic, as the first New York State Lottery winner, Frank Pesce Jr. This was followed by roles in the vampire/Mafia story Innocent Blood (1992), the comedy thriller So I Married an Axe Murderer (1993), the legal thriller The Client (1994), and the comedy Empire Records (1995). LaPaglia appeared in the role of Jimmy Wyler, lead character in the TV series Murder One, during its second and final season. LaPaglia made his debut in an Australian production opposite Hugo Weaving in The Custodian (1993). He played a hit man in Bulletproof Heart (1994) with Mimi Rogers and starred alongside future wife Gia Carides in the romantic comedy Paperback Romance (1994).

During 1997–98, LaPaglia appeared in a Broadway production of Arthur Miller's A View from the Bridge with the Roundabout Theatre Company and later received a Tony Award for his portrayal of the protagonist, Eddie Carbone. LaPaglia also played Tito Merelli in Ken Ludwig's Lend Me a Tenor on Broadway. Before A View From the Bridge opened, LaPaglia was sent a script for the pilot of The Sopranos and met its creator, David Chase, to discuss the role of protagonist Tony Soprano. However, various factors, including Fox and his Broadway role, prevented LaPaglia from obtaining the role.

Spike Lee cast LaPaglia as a New York police detective in Summer of Sam (1999). During 2000–04, LaPaglia appeared in eight episodes of the sitcom Frasier, including the finale, playing Daphne Moon's brother Simon. The role won him an Emmy Award for "Outstanding Guest Actor in a Comedy Series".

He continued to live mainly in Los Angeles, returning occasionally—especially from about 2000—for roles in major Australian films such as Looking for Alibrandi (2000), Lantana (2001), The Bank (2001), Happy Feet (2006), $9.99 (2008), Balibo (2009), and Happy Feet Two (2011). In 2002, LaPaglia co-starred as a fire captain opposite Sigourney Weaver in The Guys, a film about New York firemen who died in the World Trade Center. He also played the role onstage, rotating with Bill Murray and others. "We did it as a tribute to the men," said LaPaglia. "I've been so lucky to do it, to be part of this experience. But I can't go back to that morning or watch the video. It's too painful." He also played fictional Australian actor Anthony Bella (who played Nicky Caesar in the fictitious series Little Caesar) in the comedy movie Analyze That, but was uncredited in his role.

In addition to playing the central character in Without a Trace during 2002–09, LaPaglia co-wrote an episode entitled "Deep Water". In 2009, LaPaglia played the part of Roger East, a real-life Australian journalist, in the political thriller Balibo, about the killing in 1975 of five Australian journalists by the Indonesian Army in the town of Balibo, East Timor. The opening scene depicts East's own summary execution, during the Indonesian invasion.

LaPaglia was originally cast in Quentin Tarantino's 2012 film Django Unchained, but eventually left the project, calling the production "out of control."

In 2012 LaPaglia starred in the ABC drama pilot Americana, but it was not picked up. He next appeared in the feature adaptation of Stephen King's A Good Marriage with Joan Allen. In 2014, LaPaglia appeared in a CBS terrorism drama pilot titled Red Zone starring as a retired CIA operative and current high school football coach who returns to active duty after a terrorist attack in Washington, D.C. It was renamed Field of Play but never aired.

From about 2012, LaPaglia began accepting work in Australia more frequently. Following major roles in Underground (2012) (a biopic about Julian Assange) and the comedy Mental (2012), LaPaglia had a supporting role in the Neil Armfield's Australian romantic-drama film Holding the Man, as Bob Caleo. The 2015 film stars Ryan Corr and Craig Stott, with supporting performances from LaPaglia, Guy Pearce and Geoffrey Rush. Holding the Man was adapted from Timothy Conigrave's 1995 memoir of the same name. For his role within the film, LaPaglia was nominated for an AACTA Award for Best Actor in a Supporting Role at the 5th AACTA Awards in 2015. In that year LaPaglia returned to his home city, Adelaide, to star in A Month of Sundays as Frank, a miserable real estate agent who finds solace and redemption in a chance friendship with an elderly woman (played by Julia Blake) who reminds him of his mother. In 2016, he appeared in his first Australian TV series: The Code, a political thriller set against rising geopolitical tensions between the US and China. The following year he starred in the four-part miniseries Sunshine, an Australian crime drama series screened on SBS, set in the western Melbourne suburb of the same name, playing the role of mentor to a promising young Sudanese-Australian basketball player. The four-part miniseries is an Essential Media production, directed by Daina Reid and written by Matt Cameron and Elise McCredie. In 2018, LaPaglia appeared in the fifth season of the comedy Rake, based loosely on the life and misadventures of Charles Waterstreet.

In 2017, LaPaglia played Vito Rizzuto in the Simon Barry Canadian TV series Bad Blood, which aired on Citytv, in French on ICI Radio-Canada. From 2017 to 2020, he starred in Neil Jordan's series Riviera. Set in the French Riviera, the series follows Georgina Clios, a midwestern art curator whose life is turned upside down after the death of her billionaire husband Constantine Clios (LaPaglia) in a yacht accident. Georgina becomes immersed in a world of lies, double-dealing and crime, as she seeks to uncover the truth about her husband's death.

In 2023, LaPaglia appeared in the ABC TV series The Black Hand, which explores the activities of the Italian 'Ndrangheta in the cane fields of Queensland, Australia, in the 1920s and 1930s. The same year, he appeared in his Australian stage debut as Willy Loman in Arthur Miller's play Death of a Salesman at Her Majesty's Theatre, Melbourne, directed by Neil Armfield. The production toured to Sydney and Perth afterwards. He reprised the role in Brisbane and then at the Festival Theatre, Adelaide in September 2026, in his first stage performance in his home town. The cast includes Alison Whyte, Josh Helman and Ben O'Toole, and Mark Saturno, and is co-produced Torben and Richelle Brookman. By the end of the run it will have completed over 130 performances, in front of more than 125,000 people.

== Personal life ==
La Paglia said that he has employed an American accent since 1982, when he moved to the US, in order to further his career there.

LaPaglia's first marriage was to actress Cherie Michan. His second marriage was to actress Gia Carides, whom he met when both acted in the Australian film Lucky Break (1994). In 2015, LaPaglia and Carides split after being married for 17 years, "due to irreconcilable differences". They have a daughter together. He married Alexandra Henkel (his third marriage) on 28 April 2018. They divorced in 2025.

In the 1980s, LaPaglia was a goalkeeper in the National Soccer League, playing for Adelaide City and West Adelaide. As of 2007, he was director of Sydney FC. In October 2007, he played in a charity soccer match, playing for Hollywood United FC against David Beckham's LA Galaxy in 2007 to raise funds for those affected by the October 2007 California wildfires.

== Filmography ==
=== Film ===
Anthony LaPaglia film credits
Year	Title	Role	Notes
1987	Cold Steel	"Spooky"	Feature film
1988	Nitti: The Enforcer	Frank Nitti	Television film
1988	Police Story: Gladiator School	Sergeant Petrelli	Television film
1989	Slaves of New York	Henry	Feature film
1989	Mortal Sins	Vito	Feature film
1990	Criminal Justice	David Ringel	Television film
1990	Betsy's Wedding	Stevie Dee	Feature film
1991	He Said, She Said	Mark	Feature film
1991	One Good Cop	Detective Stevie Diroma	Feature film
1991	29th Street	Frank Pesce Jr.	Feature film
1991	The Brotherhood	Salvatore's Brother	Television film
1991	Keeper of the City	Vince Benedetto	Television film
1992	Whispers in the Dark	Larry Morgenstern	Feature film
1992	Innocent Blood	Joe Gennaro	Feature film
1992	Black Magic	Ross Gage	Television film
1993	So I Married an Axe Murderer	Tony Giardino	Feature film
1993	The Custodian	Sergeant James Quinlan	Feature film
1994	The Client	Barry 'The Blade' Muldano	Feature film
1994	Lucky Break	Eddie Mercer	Feature film
1994	Bulletproof Heart	Mick	Feature film
1994	Past Tense	Larry Talbert	Television film
1994	Mixed Nuts	Felix	Feature film
1995	Empire Records	Joe Reaves	Feature film
1996	Chameleon	Willie Serling	Feature film
1996	Trees Lounge	Rob	Feature film
1996	Brilliant Lies	Gary Fitzgerald	Feature film
1996	Never Give Up: The Jimmy V Story	Jimmy 'Jimmy V' Valvano	Television film
1997	Commandments	Harry Luce	Feature film
1997	The Garden of Redemption	Don Paolo Montale	Television film
1998	Phoenix	Detective Mike Henshaw	Feature film
1998	Mob Law: A Film Portrait of Oscar Goodman	Narrator (voice)	Documentary film
1998	The Repair Show		Television film
1999	Lansky	Charles "Lucky" Luciano	Television film
1999	Black and Blue	Bobby Benedetto	Television film
1999	Summer of Sam	Detective Lou Petrocelli	Feature film
1999	Sweet and Lowdown	Al Torrio	Mockumentary film
2000	Company Man	Fidel Castro	Feature film
2000	Looking for Alibrandi	Michael Andretti	Feature film
2000	The House of Mirth	Sim Rosedale	Feature film
2000	Autumn in New York	John	Feature film
2001	Jack the Dog	Jack's Attorney	Feature film
2001	Lantana	Detective Leon Zat	Feature film
2001	The Bank	Simon O'Reily	Feature film
2001	On the Edge	Dr. Maas	Television film
2002	The Salton Sea	Al Garcetti	Feature film
2002	Dead Heat	Ray LaMarr	Feature film
2002	Road to Perdition	Al Capone	Uncredited; Feature film
2002	I'm with Lucy	Bobby Staley	Feature film
2002	The Guys	Nick	Feature film
2002	Analyze That	Anthony Bella / Nicky Caesar	Uncredited cameo; Feature film
2003	Manhood	Jack's Attorney	Feature film
2003	Happy Hour	Tulley	Feature film
2003	Spinning Boris	Dick Dresner	Feature film
2004	Winter Solstice	Jim Winters	Feature film; Also executive producer
2006	The Architect	Leo Waters	Feature film
2006	The Away Game	Narrator	TV documentary; Also executive producer
2006	Played	Detective Drummond	Feature film
2006	Happy Feet	Boss Skua (voice)	Animated feature film
2008	$9.99	Jim Peck (voice)	Stop motion feature film
2009	Balibo	Roger East	Feature film; Also producer
2010	Overnight	Captain Brody	Feature film
2010	Legend of the Guardians: The Owls of Ga'Hoole	Twilight (voice)	Animated feature film
2011	All-Star Superman	Lex Luthor (voice)	Animated feature film
2011	Happy Feet Two	Alpha Skua (voice)	Animated feature film
2011	The Ride	Driver	Short film
2011	In Loco Parentis	Dad	Short film
2012	Overnight	Tully	Feature film
2012	Crazy Kind of Love	Gordie	Feature film
2012	Mental	Barry Moochmore	Feature film
2012	Underground: The Julian Assange Story	Detective Ken Roberts	Television film
2012	Americana	Robert Soulter	Television film
2013	Boomerang	Bill Hamilton	Television film
2014	A Good Marriage	Bob	Feature film
2014	Big Stone Gap	Spec Broadwater	Feature film
2014	Newcomer	Daniel	Feature film
2014	Red Zone		Television film
2015	A Month of Sundays	Frank Mollard	Feature film; Also executive producer
2015	This Isn't Funny	Mike	Feature film
2015	Holding the Man	Bob Caleo	Feature film
2015	The Eichmann Show	Leo Hurwitz	Television film
2016	The Assignment	John 'Honest John' Hartunian	Feature film
2016	Toy Gun	Gaetano Lolli	Feature film
2017	Annabelle: Creation	Samuel Mullins	Feature film
2019	Below	Terry	Feature film
2019	Dark Whispers: Volume 1	Driver	Feature film; Segment: "The Ride"
2020	Pearl	Jack Wolf	Feature film
2021	Nitram	Maurice	Feature film
TBA	R.U.R.	TBA	Feature film

=== Television ===
Anthony LaPaglia television credits
Year	Title	Role	Notes
1984	Kenny & Dolly: A Christmas to Remember	British Flyer	Television Special (TV debut)
1984	Amazing Stories	Mechanic	Episode: "The Mission"
1986	Magnum, P.I.	Albert Stanley Higgins	Episode: "Who Is Don Luis Higgins... and Why Is He Doing These Terrible Things to Me?"
1986	The Twilight Zone	Punk	Episode: "A Day in Beaumont/The Last Defender of Camelot"
1988	The Equalizer	Agent #1	Episode: "The Child Broker"
1989	A Man Called Hawk	Jesse	Episode: "A Time and A Place"
1989	Gideon Oliver	Raskin	Episode: "Sleep Well, Professor Oliver"
1989	Hardball	Randy Stoltz	Episode: "The Silver Scream"
1990	Equal Justice	George Griffin	Episode: "The Price of Justice"
1990	Father Dowling Mysteries	Paul Damon	Episode: "The Visiting Priest Mystery"
1991	Tales from the Crypt	Abel, The Cable Guy	Episode: "Spoiled"
1996–97	Murder One	Jimmy Wyler	18 episodes
1997	Murder One: Diary of a Serial Killer	Jimmy Wyler	TV miniseries; 6 episodes
2000	Normal, Ohio	David	Unaired pilot
2000–04	Frasier	Simon Moon	8 episodes
2002	Nature	Narrator	Episode: "Big Red Roos"
2002–09	Without a Trace	Jack Malone	160 episodes; (also writer - 3 episodes)
2007	CSI: Crime Scene Investigation	Jack Malone	Episode: "Who and What"
2008	Tellement vrai		
2016	The Code	Jan Roth	6 episodes
2016	Swedish Dicks	Jack	Episode: "#1.9"
2017	Bad Blood	Vito Rizzuto	6 episodes
2017	Sunshine	Eddie	TV miniseries, 4 episodes
2017–19	Riviera	Constantine Clios	16 episodes
2018	Rake	Linus	2 episodes
2020	Halifax: Retribution	Tom Saracen	7 episodes
2023	Florida Man	Sonny Valentine	7 episodes
2023	The Black Hand	Presenter	
2024	Boy Swallows Universe	Tytus Broz	7 episodes

=== Theatre ===
Anthony LaPaglia theater credits
Year	Title	Role	Notes
1987	Bouncers	Les	Minetta Lane Theatre, New York City
1993	On the Open Road	Angel	Joseph Papp Public Theater/Martinson Hall, New York City
1995	The Rose Tattoo	Alvaro Mangiacavallo	Circle in the Square Theatre, Broadway
1995–1996	Northeast Local	Mickey	Lincoln Center Theater, New York City
1997–1998	A View from the Bridge	Eddie Carbone	Criterion Center Stage Right, Broadway
2002	The Guys		The Flea Theater, New York City
2010	Lend Me a Tenor	Tito Merelli	Music Box Theatre, Broadway
2023	Death of a Salesman	Willy Loman	Her Majesty's Theatre, Melbourne, Australia
2024	Death of a Salesman	Willy Loman	Theatre Royal Sydney
2026	Death of a Salesman	Willy Loman	Her Majesty's Theatre, Melbourne, Australia

== Awards and nominations ==
Organizations	Year	Category	Work	Result	Ref.
AACTA Awards	1993	Best Lead Actor	The Custodian	Nominated	
AACTA Awards	2001	Best Lead Actor	Lantana	Won	
AACTA Awards	2006	Best Lead Actor	Winter Solstice	Nominated	
AACTA Awards	2009	Best Lead Actor	Balibo	Won	
AACTA Awards	2009	Best Actor	Without a Trace	Nominated	
AACTA Awards	2015	Best Supporting Actor	Holding the Man	Nominated	
AACTA Awards	2017	Best Guest or Supporting Actor in a Television Drama	Sunshine	Nominated	
AACTA Awards	2021	Best Actor in a Supporting Role	Nitram	Won	
Australian Film Critics Association	2016	Best Supporting Actor	Holding the Man	Nominated	
Australian Film Critics Association	2017	Best Supporting Actor	A Month of Sundays	Nominated	
Film Critics Circle of Australia	2001	Best Supporting Actor – Male	Looking for Alibrandi	Nominated	
Film Critics Circle of Australia	2002	Best Actor – Male	Latana	Won	
Film Critics Circle of Australia	2010	Best Actor – Male	Balibo	Won	
Film Critics Circle of Australia	2016	Best Actor – Supporting Role	Holding the Man	Nominated	
Behind the Voice Actors Award	2012	Best Vocal Ensemble in a TV Special	All-Star Superman	Won	
Chicago Film Critics Association	1991	Most Promising Actor	Betsy's Wedding	Nominated	
Chlotrudis Award	2003	Best Lead Actor	Lantana	Nominated	
Drama Desk Award	1995	Outstanding Featured Actor in a Play	The Rose Tattoo	Nominated	
Drama Desk Award	1997	Outstanding Actor in a Play	A View from the Bridge	Won	
Durban International Film Festival	2002	Best Actor	Lantana	Won	
Golden Globe Award	2004	Best Lead Actor in a Television Series – Drama	Without a Trace	Won	
Hamptons International Film Festival	2004	Career Achievement		Won	
IF Award	2001	Best Actor	Lantana	Won	
IF Award	2009	Best Feature Film	Balibo	Nominated	
IF Award	2009	Best Actor	Balibo	Nominated	
Newport Beach Film Festival	2004	Outstanding Achievement in Acting	Happy Hour	Won	
Primetime Emmy Award	2000	Outstanding Guest Actor in a Comedy Series	Frasier (episode: "Dark Side of the Moon")	Nominated	
Primetime Emmy Award	2002	Outstanding Guest Actor in a Comedy Series	Frasier (episode: "Mother Load")	Won	
Primetime Emmy Award	2004	Outstanding Guest Actor in a Comedy Series	Frasier (episode: "Goodnight, Seattle")	Nominated	
Primetime Emmy Award	2004	Outstanding Lead Actor in a Drama Series	Without a Trace (episode: "Pilot")	Nominated	
Prism Award	2004	Performance in a Film Festival Award	Happy Hour	Won	
Satellite Award	2004	Best Lead Actor in a Series – Drama	Without a Trace	Nominated	
Satellite Award	2005	Best Lead Actor in a Series – Drama	Without a Trace	Nominated	
Screen Actors Guild Award	2004	Outstanding Actor in a Drama Series	Without a Trace	Nominated	
Screen Actors Guild Award	2004	Outstanding Ensemble in a Drama Series	Without a Trace	Nominated	
Screen Actors Guild Award	2005	Outstanding Ensemble in a Drama Series	Without a Trace	Nominated	
Theatre World Award	1995	Distinguished Performer	The Rose Tattoo	Won	
Tony Award	1998	Best Actor in a Play	A View from the Bridge	Won	
