= Kiki Musampa =

Footballer (born 1977)

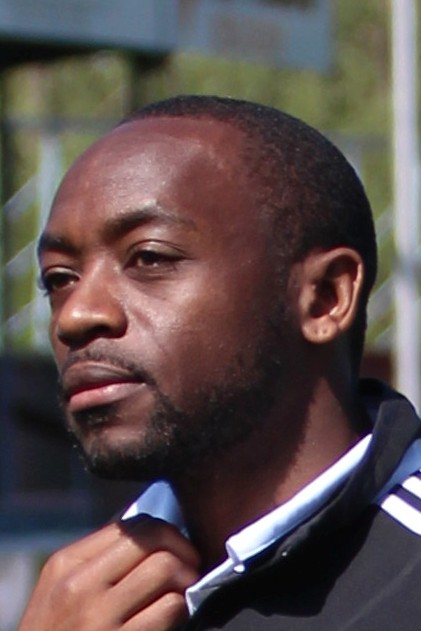
- Musampa in 2014

Personal information
- Full name: Kizito Musampa
- Date of birth: 20 July 1977 (age 49)
- Place of birth: Kinshasa, Zaire
- Height: 1.78 m (5 ft 10 in)
- Position: Left winger

Youth career
- 1990–1994: Ajax

Senior career*
Years	Team	Apps	(Gls)
1994–1997	Ajax	42	(6)
1997–1999	Bordeaux	33	(5)
1999–2003	Málaga	96	(22)
2003–2006	Atlético Madrid	34	(2)
2005–2006	→ Manchester City (loan)	41	(3)
2006–2007	Trabzonspor	14	(0)
2007–2008	AZ	5	(0)
2008	FC Seoul	3	(0)
2009	Willem II	6	(0)

International career
1992	Netherlands U17	3	(1)
1993–1994	Netherlands U18	4	(1)
1994–1995	Netherlands U19	11	(7)
1996–2000	Netherlands U21	25	(8)
- * Club domestic league appearances and goals

Kizito Musampa (born 20 July 1977) is a former professional footballer who played as a left winger.

Musampa had a journeyman career, playing for Ajax, Bordeaux, Málaga, Atlético Madrid and Manchester City. Born Zaire, he earned 28 caps representing the Netherlands at under-20 and under-21 levels. He was known for his pace and free-kicks.

== Club career ==
=== Ajax and Bordeaux ===
Born in Kinshasa, Zaire, now the Democratic Republic of the Congo, Musampa first started off in the Ajax youth academy, where he played a total of 31 games in two seasons and scored six goals including a winner scored against NAC Breda, which was the first Ajax goal in the new current stadium, the Johan Cruyff Arena. He also scored in the quarter-final of the Champions League against Borussia Dortmund in 1996; Ajax went on to win the game 2–0, and went on to the final. He subsequently signed for Bordeaux in 1997 to further his experience and with the intention of being selected for the Netherlands national team to compete in the 1998 FIFA World Cup, although he was ultimately overlooked by then coach Guus Hiddink.

=== Málaga and Atlético ===
After spending two seasons at the French club, he decided to move on to Spanish club Málaga, where he played 94 games and scored a total of 22 goals in four seasons. In 2003, he was transferred to Atlético Madrid for €3 million on a five-year contract, a year before his Málaga contract was due to expire, in what he viewed as a potentially good career move. In his first season with the club, he played 26 matches and scored two goals; although, in the following season, he was relegated to the substitutes' bench and only scraped together eight games in 2004.

=== Manchester City ===
In January 2005, Musampa moved to Manchester City of the Premier League on loan after becoming a fringe player at Atlético. In his first six months, he scored three goals in 14 games; his first City goal was a "spectacular volley" in the last-minute which was the winner against Liverpool and gave Stuart Pearce his first win as City manager, while he also scored goals against Aston Villa in a 2–1 victory, and an equaliser against Middlesbrough which wasn't enough to help City qualify for the 2005–06 UEFA Cup.

In June 2005, Musampa agreed up to stay at Manchester City for a second season. He started the new season as a regular first team player, but lost his first team place in December, after which he played irregularly, with the majority of his appearances being in central midfield. At the end of the 2005–06 season, he returned to Atlético.

=== Trabzonspor and AZ ===
On 30 August 2006, Musampa signed a three-year contract for Turkish club Trabzonspor on a free transfer.

After being released from Trabzonspor, Musampa trained with English Premiership side Sunderland for a period but ultimately was not signed by the club. After returning to the Netherlands, Musampa trained with Eredivisie outfit AZ. In November 2007, he signed a contract at the club for the rest of the season, but he was released from his contract on 1 January 2008.

=== FC Seoul ===
After an unsuccessful trial with Toronto FC of Major League Soccer he signed a two-year contract with K-League side FC Seoul in March 2008. His stay in South Korea was brief, as he made just three league appearances and two League Cup appearances for the club before the two parties agreed to mutually terminate his contract in June 2008.

=== Willem II ===
On 14 March 2009, Musampa returned to professional football signing for Willem II in the Netherlands.

=== Metz ===
In September 2009, the winger went on trial with French side Metz and scored one goal in a friendly match, but the club did not sign him in the end.

He eventually announced his retirement from professional football.

== International career ==
Musampa was a member of the Netherlands U20 team at the 1995 FIFA World Youth Championship, playing all three group matches, the team did not proceed past the group stage. Musampa went on to be a key player for the Netherlands Under-21s and achieved 25 caps, scoring 8 goals, he is currently in the top 10 players for both caps and goals at that level. His form whilst on loan at Manchester City earned him a call-up to the Netherlands squad to play Romania and Finland but he played in neither game.

== Honours ==
Ajax

- Intercontinental Cup: 1995
- UEFA Champions League: 1994-95
- UEFA Super Cup: 1995
- Eredivisie: 1994–95, 1995-96
- Dutch Supercup: 1995

Bordeaux

- Division 1: 1998-99

Málaga

- UEFA Intertoto Cup: 2002
