= Greg Sutton (soccer) =

Canadian soccer player

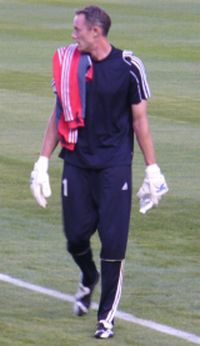
- Sutton in 2007

Personal information
- Full name: Gregory Sutton
- Date of birth: April 19, 1977 (age 49)
- Place of birth: Hamilton, Ontario, Canada
- Height: 6 ft 6 in (1.98 m)
- Position: Goalkeeper

Youth career
- 1997–1998: St. Lawrence Saints

Senior career*
Years	Team	Apps	(Gls)
1999–2000	Chicago Fire	5	(0)
1999	→ Indiana Blast (loan)	1	(0)
1999	→ Lehigh Valley Steam (loan)	3	(0)
2000	MetroStars	0	(0)
2000	Cincinnati Riverhawks	13	(0)
2001–2006	Montreal Impact	132	(0)
2007–2009	Toronto FC	34	(0)
2010–2011	New York Red Bulls	13	(0)
2011	→ Montreal Impact (loan)	1	(0)
2012	Montreal Impact	1	(0)
Total		203	(0)

International career
2004–2009	Canada	16	(0)
- * Club domestic league appearances and goals

Gregory Sutton (born April 19, 1977) is a Canadian former soccer player and broadcaster. He played as a goalkeeper for several A-League and Major League Soccer teams, including the Montreal Impact and Toronto FC, as well as the Canada national team.

== Playing career ==
=== Youth and college ===
Sutton was born in Canada, but spent a good part of his adolescence playing soccer in Bethel, Connecticut, United States, where his father was transferred as part of his employment. He played college soccer at St. Lawrence University in Canton, New York.

=== Professional ===
During the 2003 season, Sutton helped the Montreal Impact become the USL squad with the lowest goals allowed total and won the Goalkeeper of the Year honor. He had a league-leading 0.73 goals-against average and the most minutes in goal in the league (2463). During the 2004 season with the Impact, the team won the A-League.

On November 29, 2006, Sutton returned to MLS, having been allocated to the newly formed Toronto FC for the 2007 season. Sutton was the team's starting goalkeeper until he received a concussion during CONCACAF Gold Cup training with Canada in June. Since a team doctor did not accompany the Canadian squad, he was cleared by a local physician and later suffered from post-concussion syndrome, ruling him out of play for the rest of the year.

Sutton was dropped for the 2008 season opener in favour of draft pick Brian Edwards, but made his return against D.C. United at RFK Stadium in Toronto's second game. He conceded four goals but made a number of important saves. He retained his position for the next three games, recording three straight shutouts in April. He was named to the 2008 Inactive All Star Roster for his strong performance in the first half of the 2008 season. On June 9, 2009, Sutton was released by Toronto FC, to make room for the acquisition of Nick Garcia.

On March 11, 2010, it was announced that Sutton had signed with the New York Red Bulls. On April 27, 2010, Sutton officially debuted for New York in a 2–1 victory over Philadelphia Union in a 2010 Lamar Hunt U.S. Open Cup qualification match. On August 11, 2010, Sutton made his league debut for New York recording a 1–0 shutout over his former club Toronto FC.

Sutton began the 2011 Major League Soccer season as New York's starting goalkeeper helping the club to a 1–0 victory over Seattle Sounders FC on March 19, 2011. After the signing of German goalkeeper Frank Rost, Sutton was loaned out to Canadian North American Soccer League team Montreal Impact on July 16, 2011. As part of the loan agreement, Montreal was given the option to acquire Sutton's MLS rights at the end of the season as the club prepared for a move to MLS in 2012. Montreal exercised this option for Sutton's rights but then declined his 2012 contract option, making him eligible for the 2011 MLS Re-Entry Draft. Sutton came to terms on a new agreement with Montreal Impact on December 9, 2011. On October 29, 2012, Sutton announced his retirement from professional soccer after a 14-year career.

=== International ===
Sutton made his Canada national team debut on January 18, 2004, against Barbados. He was invited to the men's World Cup team development camp in July 2004 against Hearts and helped his side to a 1–1 draw. Sutton earned his second senior cap and kept a clean sheet against Northern Ireland in February 2005 in a 1–0 win. On January 18 of that year he was called up to the national team roster once again. Sutton competed in the last three Gold Cups and most recently helping Canada reach the Quarterfinals of the 2009 Gold Cup.

== Coaching career ==
From 2002 to 2003, Sutton was an assistant coach with the University de Montreal Carabins.

On May 7, 2013, it was announced that Sutton would become the head coach of the Concordia University's men's soccer team. He had been an assistant coach with the team since 2011. In August 2018 Sutton was also named head coach of Concordia University women's soccer program.

== Broadcasting career ==
Sutton was a match analyst for TSN from 2013 to 2022, primarily covering MLS matches. He joined the commentary team for Apple TV's MLS Season Pass in 2023.

== Honours ==
St. Lawrence University:

- 1st Team All-American - 1 (1998)
- 2nd team All-American - 2 (1996, 1997)

Montreal Impact:

- United Soccer League Goalkeeper of the year -4 (2003, 2004, 2005, 2006)
- United Soccer League MVP - (2004)
- A-League/USL - 1 (2004)
- Voyageurs Cup - 5 (2002, 2003, 2004, 2005, 2006)
