= Fuad Ibrahim =

Ethiopian footballer

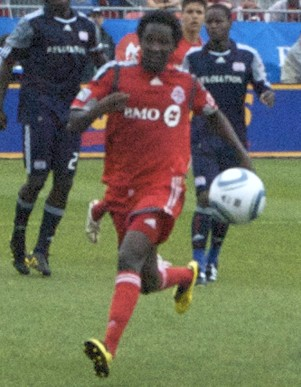
- Ibrahim playing for Toronto FC in 2010

Personal information
- Full name: Fuad Abas Ibrahim
- Date of birth: 15 August 1991 (age 35)
- Place of birth: Bik'a, Ethiopia
- Height: 6 ft 0 in (1.83 m)
- Positions: Forward; winger

Youth career
- 2006–2007: IMG Soccer Academy

Senior career*
Years	Team	Apps	(Gls)
2007–2008	FC Dallas	0	(0)
2008–2010	Toronto FC	26	(3)
2012	Minnesota Stars	5	(0)
2013–2014	AC Kajaani	12	(1)
2014–2015	Oromo United		
2016–2017	Dire Dawa City		
Total		43	(4)

International career^{‡}
2006–2007	United States U17	29	(7)
2008–2010	United States U20	23	(5)
2012–2013	Ethiopia	6	(1)
- * Club domestic league appearances and goals as of November 27, 2019 ‡ National team caps and goals as of August 29, 2013

Abdusalam Abas Ibrahim, known as Fuad Ibrahim and Ibee Ibrahim (born 15 August 1991), is an Ethiopian former professional footballer who played as a forward.

== Early and personal life ==
Ibrahim was born in Ethiopia and raised in Richfield, Minnesota.

== Club career ==
Ibrahim spent his early career with the IMG Soccer Academy, FC Dallas and Toronto FC. At the time of being drafted in 2007, he was the second-youngest ever player selected in the MLS Superdraft.

Ibrahim graduated from Generation Adidas at the end of the 2010 MLS season. He returned to professional soccer by signing with the Minnesota Stars FC of the North American Soccer League in April 2012.

Ibrahim signed with AC Kajaani of the Finnish 2nd division in April 2013 and scored on his debut. He joined Oromo United in Minnesota, in 2014, after his time in Finland. In 2016, he joined Dire Dawa City S.C. in Ethiopia.

== International career ==
Ibrahim represented the United States at youth international level, playing for the under-17 and under-20 teams.

He was called up for Ethiopia's squad for the 2013 Africa Cup of Nations, and scored his first international goal in the Antelopes' 2–1 win over Tanzania in the warm-up to the competition.

=== International goals ===
#	Date	Venue	Opponent	Score	Result	Competition	Reference
1	12 January 2013	Addis Ababa Stadium, Addis Ababa, Ethiopia	Tanzania	1–0	2–1	Friendly	

== Coaching career ==
After his playing career, he became a youth soccer coach with White Bear Soccer Club in Minnesota.
