= Jim Brennan =

Canadian soccer coach and former player

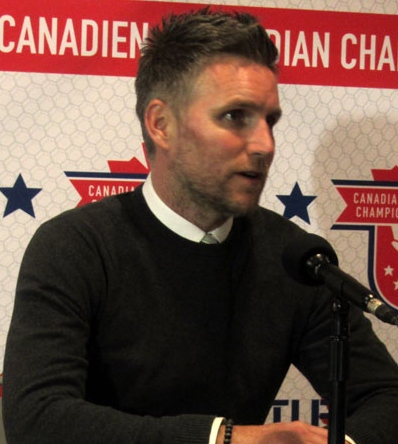
- Brennan in 2019

Personal information
- Full name: James Gerald Brennan
- Date of birth: 8 May 1977 (age 49)
- Place of birth: East York, Toronto, Canada
- Height: 1.84 m (6 ft 0 in)
- Position: Defender

Youth career
- 1994–1996: Sora Lazio–Woodbridge Strikers

Senior career*
Years	Team	Apps	(Gls)
1996–1999	Bristol City	64	(3)
1999–2003	Nottingham Forest	137	(1)
2001	→ Huddersfield Town (loan)	2	(0)
2003–2006	Norwich City	43	(1)
2006	Southampton	20	(0)
2007–2010	Toronto FC	93	(4)
Total		368	(9)

International career
1993	Canada U17	1	(0)
1999–2008	Canada	49	(6)

Managerial career
- 2011–2012: TFC Academy U17
- 2012–2014: Toronto FC (assistant)
- 2015–2017: Aurora FC
- 2018–2021: York United
Medal record
Representing Canada
Men's soccer
CONCACAF Gold Cup
Winner	2000 United States
Third place	2002 United States
- * Club domestic league appearances and goals

James Gerald Brennan (born 8 May 1977) is a Canadian soccer coach, analyst and former player. During his playing career, he played as a defender in Canada and England, most notably with Bristol City, Nottingham Forest, Southampton, Norwich City (where he won the 2003–04 Football League First Division) and Toronto FC.

He also earned 49 caps for the Canadian national team, was a member of the Canada side which won the 2000 CONCACAF Gold Cup, and later represented his country at the 2001 FIFA Confederations Cup, the 2002 CONCACAF Gold Cup and the 2005 CONCACAF Gold Cup. He was inducted into the Canada Soccer Hall of Fame in November 2015.

== Club career ==
=== Bristol City ===
A left-sided defender who also has played the left side of the midfield, Brennan grew up in Newmarket, Ontario, and started playing with Bristol City youth team in 1994 and made his professional debut in 1996 with Bristol City against cross town rivals Bristol Rovers in the Football League First Division. In 5 years Brennan had five managers including Russell Osman, Benny Lennartsson, Joe Jordan, John Ward and Tony Pulis. In 64 first-team appearances for City over five seasons, Brennan scored three goals. Brennan started his career in the Bristol City youth team and worked his way into the first team before being sold to Nottingham Forest.

=== Nottingham Forest ===
Brennan joined Nottingham Forest for £1.5 million in October 1999 and was bought by ex-England captain David Platt. Brennan was the first Canadian-born player to be sold over the 1 million pound mark. In 137 games played with Forest over four seasons under David Platt and Paul Hart, Brennan scored just once, in a 4–0 victory against Norwich City, the team he would later go on to sign for. While he was recovering from a double hernia he had a short loan spell at Huddersfield with his old manager Joe Jordan. He also came on as a substitute in two league games while on loan to Huddersfield in 2000–01 and received a red card against Birmingham City and headed back to Forest.

=== Norwich City ===
Brennan joined Norwich City on a free Bosman transfer in 2003 and was managed by Nigel Worthington. During the 2003–04 season in Division One of the Football League, Brennan scored twice in just nine appearances, as he battled an abductor muscle injury. His goals came against Everton in the FA Cup and Coventry City in the league. Despite his personal struggles with fitness, the season saw Norwich win the First Division title and promotion back to the Premier League.

=== Southampton ===
Brennan joined George Burley at Southampton on 27 January 2006 with his contract due to expire in summer having failed to make an impact on the Norwich first team after a series of injuries. However, after finishing his contract he left the club the following May and departed England to play for his hometown team Toronto FC.

=== Toronto FC ===
On 8 September 2006, Brennan signed with MLS team Toronto FC for the 2007 season, becoming the first player and captain in club history. Brennan remained captain under Mo Johnston, John Carver, Chris Cummins and Preki. He also became the first Canadian to score for Toronto FC, registering a goal off a free kick against the Columbus Crew on 26 May 2007. This goal subsequently became a Sierra Mist Goal of the Week. Brennan went on to play 27 games, all of them starts, for Toronto FC, the most of any player. He earned a reputation as Toronto's "Iron Man," as he managed to play many of his games despite a rib injury, and looked as though he would go on to play every match of the season. Unfortunately, a knee injury prevented Brennan from achieving this feat. Brennan retained the captaincy for the 2008 season, and nearly managed to score in his team's opening match. Brennan has since added goals in 2008 against Chivas USA in Carson, California and to open the 2009 season at Kansas City, off pass from newly acquired Canadian international teammate Dwayne De Rosario.

Brennan also made an appearance during the 2008 MLS All-Star game in his home stadium, BMO Field. The MLS All-Stars won the game 3–2 against West Ham United. On 6 April 2010 Brennan retired as player to become the assistant general manager for Toronto FC.

== International career ==
Brennan played at the 1993 FIFA U-17 World Championship in Japan, in a team alongside Paul Stalteri and Jason Bent. He then made his senior debut for Canada in an April 1999 friendly match against Northern Ireland and went on to earn a total of 49 caps, scoring 6 goals. He has represented Canada in 10 FIFA World Cup qualification matches. He has played for Canada at the Confederations Cup 2001 and played against Brazil, Cameroon and hosts Japan as well he competed at the 2005 CONCACAF Gold Cup. Brennan won a gold medal in the 2000 CONCACAF Gold Cup defeating Colombia and bronze medal in the 2002 CONCACAF Gold Cup defeating South Korea.

=== International Goals ===
Scores and results list Canada's goal tally first.

#	Date	Venue	Opponent	Score	Result	Competition
1	2 September 1999	Varsity Stadium, Toronto, Canada	Jamaica	1–0	1–0	Friendly match
2	9 October 2000	Winnipeg Soccer Complex, Winnipeg, Canada	Panama	1–0	1–0	2002 World Cup Qualification
3	12 February 2003	June 11 Stadium, Tripoli, Libya	Libya	2–1	4–2	Friendly match
4	13 June 2004	Richardson Memorial Stadium, Kingston, Canada	Belize	4–0	4–0	2006 World Cup Qualification
5	16 June 2004	Richardson Memorial Stadium, Kingston, Canada	Belize	4–0	4–0	2006 World Cup Qualification
6	1 March 2006	Ernst Happel Stadium, Vienna, Austria	Austria	1–0	2–0	Friendly

== Coaching career ==
=== Toronto FC ===
Following Brennan's retirement, Toronto FC named him assistant general manager to Mo Johnston. However following the firing of Johnston in the late 2010 season, Brennan's position remained unknown with the club until the new management team was put in place. It included Paul Mariner as director of player development and Aron Winter as head coach. On 1 March 2011, the club announced that the new position of Brennan within the club would be as head coach of the Toronto FC Academy U-17 team in the Second Division of the Canadian Soccer League; his first coaching position.

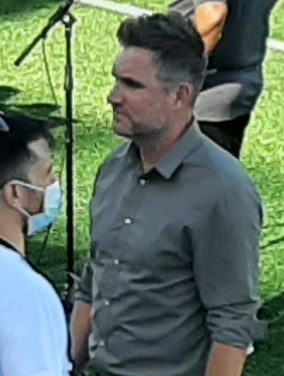
Brennan as head coach of York United in 2021

On 14 May 2012, Brennan was promoted to first-team assistant coach under Aron Winter. On 28 September 2013, Brennan filled in for Toronto FC head coach Ryan Nelsen who was serving a suspension. In August 2014, Brennan was fired along with Nelsen and the rest of the club's first-team staff.

=== Aurora FC ===
In March 2015, Brennan became the executive director and director of soccer operations at the Aurora Youth Soccer Club. Under his leadership the club was renamed Aurora FC and gained entry into the semi-professional League1 Ontario. He created Aurora FC's slogan One Style, One Passion. He coached his sons' 2008 Boys team for about 4 years. He later departed the club in December 2017. He stopped coaching the 2008 boys in late December 2018.

=== York United ===
In 2018, Brennan joined Carlo Baldassarra and Preben Ganzhorn to found the company that owns the Canadian Premier League club York9 FC. On 27 July 2018, York9 FC announced Brennan would serve as the club's first head coach as well as executive vice president of soccer operations. On 11 December 2020, the club rebranded as York United FC.

On 23 November 2021, York United announced that they had parted ways with Brennan with his contract with the club already due to expire prior to the start of the 2022 season.

== Personal life ==
Brennan's father is from Northern Ireland, while his mother is from Scotland.

== Honours ==
=== Player ===
Bristol City

- Football League Second Division second-place promotion: 1997–98

Norwich City

- Football League First Division: 2003–04

Toronto

- Canadian Championship: 2009

Canada U-20

- CONCACAF U-20 Championship: 1996

Canada

- CONCACAF Gold Cup: 2000; third place: 2002

Individual

- Canadian Player of the Year: 1999
- Confederation Cup All-Star Team: 2001
- Toronto FC Player of the Year: 2007
- Red Patch Boys Player of the Year: 2007
- Toronto FC Defender of the Year: 2008
- 2008 MLS All-Star Game: 2008
- Toronto FC Humanitarian of the Year: 2009
- Canadian Soccer Hall of Fame: 2014 – 2000 CONCACAF Gold Cup Squad
- Canadian Soccer Hall of Fame: 2015

Sporting positions
Preceded by N/A	Toronto captain 2007–2010	Succeeded by Dwayne De Rosario
