= Danny Dichio =

English footballer (born 1974)

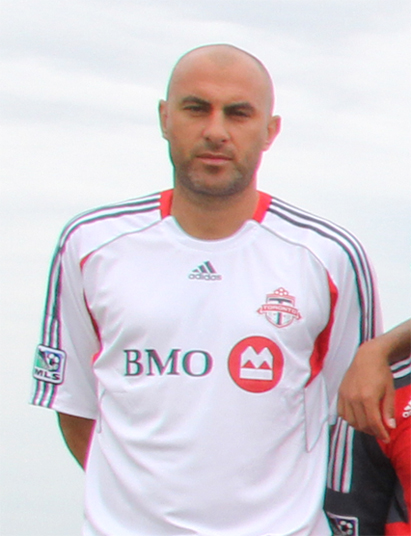
- Dichio in 2012

Personal information
- Full name: Daniele Salvatore Ernest Dichio
- Date of birth: 19 October 1974 (age 52)
- Place of birth: Notting Hill, London, England
- Height: 6 ft 3 in (1.91 m)
- Position: Forward

Youth career
- 1991–1993: Queens Park Rangers

Senior career*
Years	Team	Apps	(Gls)
1993–1997	Queens Park Rangers	75	(20)
1993	→ Welling United (loan)	3	(8)
1994	→ Barnet (loan)	9	(2)
1997–1998	Sampdoria	0	(0)
1997	→ Lecce (loan)	4	(1)
1998–2001	Sunderland	76	(17)
2001	→ West Bromwich Albion (loan)	3	(4)
2001–2004	West Bromwich Albion	63	(16)
2003	→ Derby County (loan)	6	(1)
2004	→ Millwall (loan)	5	(5)
2004–2005	Millwall	41	(12)
2005–2007	Preston North End	63	(9)
2007–2009	Toronto FC	59	(14)
Total		415	(112)

International career
1995	England U21	1	(0)

Managerial career
- 2010: Toronto FC (assistant)
- 2010–2020: Toronto FC III
- 2021: Toronto FC II (assistant)
- 2022–2023: Sacramento Republic (assistant)
- 2024–: Detroit City FC
- * Club domestic league appearances and goals

Daniele Salvatore Ernest Dichio (Italian: Daniele Salvatore Ernesto Dichio; born 19 October 1974) is an English retired professional footballer and the manager of Detroit City FC.

Dichio scored the first goal in Toronto FC history against the Chicago Fire on 12 May 2007. Later in that same game he became the first player in club history to be red-carded.

After retiring from playing, Dichio coached at various levels of the Toronto FC organization, followed by a stint as an assistant at Sacramento Republic FC, before moving into his current role.

== Playing career ==
=== Europe ===
Born in Hammersmith, London, to an English mother and an Italian father, Dichio began his career at Queens Park Rangers, joining as an apprentice in June 1991 and turning professional in May 1993. The sale of Les Ferdinand to Newcastle United in the summer of 1995 provided Dichio with the opportunity to break into QPR's first team in the 1995–96 Premier League season. He scored on his league debut for QPR against Aston Villa, and forged a strike partnership with Kevin Gallen throughout the remainder of the season. Prior to his QPR debut, he played on loan at Barnet and Welling United. Dichio moved to Italy's Serie A with Sampdoria in the close season of 1996/97 playing only one game in the UEFA cup, and soon after had a loan spell at Lecce. He returned to England to join Sunderland in January 1998, helping them win promotion to the Premiership as Division One champions with 105 points in his first full season (1998–99), and finish seventh in the Premiership in the next two seasons.

While at Sunderland, Dichio went on loan to West Bromwich Albion at the start of the 2001–02 season. The spell was a successful one, with Dichio scoring on his debut away at Sheffield Wednesday on 25 August 2001 and again on his home debut in a 1–0 win against Gillingham two days later. He joined the Midlands side permanently in November 2001 in a £1.25 million deal, and helped them to achieve promotion. In Albion's first Premiership campaign the following season, Dichio was their joint top scorer in the league (with Scott Dobie), though with just five Premiership goals, not enough to prevent relegation. He finished as top scorer overall by virtue of his FA Cup hat-trick against Bradford City. The following season saw Dichio move himself and his family up to the Midlands, having previously commuted from London. Despite settling in the area, however, he failed to regain a starting place in the team and in October 2003, he joined Derby on loan, scoring once against Ipswich Town. He then had another loan spell, this time at Millwall, whom he later joined on a permanent deal.

Dichio was unable to play in the 2004 FA Cup final for Millwall, due to suspension. He scored 10 goals in 27 starts for Millwall in the 2004–05 season. In the summer of 2005, he moved to Preston North End, but did not score in the league in his first season.

In the summer of 2006, he was the subject of a bid from Brighton. Although a fee was agreed, Dichio chose to stay at Preston and fight for his place. On 14 October 2006, he scored his first league goal for Preston in a 4–1 win over Sunderland. Dichio, despite a difficult start to his Preston career, won over the fans at Deepdale causing many to be greatly upset as the news broke that his move to Toronto was to be finalised.

=== Toronto FC ===
In April 2007, Dichio was released from his contract to let him join the newly created MLS club Toronto FC.

Over the next three seasons, Dichio made 59 league appearances for Toronto in the MLS, Canadian Championship and CONCACAF Champions League games. He scored 14 goals, including the club's first ever goal and the club's last goal of its inaugural season. He managed five goals in five shots on target to start the 2008 Major League Soccer season. That same year, Dichio also cemented his association with the Thornhill Soccer Club, a non-profit club that organises soccer leagues for age groups 4 and up, including adult leagues. On 18 March 2009, he announced his intention to retire after the 2009 Major League Soccer season and to continue living in Toronto while also pursuing coaching opportunities. However, on 9 September 2009, Dichio officially announced his retirement with six games remaining on Toronto FC's season schedule. His new role with the team was Toronto FC Team Ambassador, participating in local community appearances, and Academy Coach, where he was assigned to "assist coaches on all three Toronto FC teams while beginning to learn about the nuances of MLS". He remains much beloved of Toronto fans, who sing a song in his honour in the 24th minute of each game, commemorating his inaugural goal for the franchise (scored at 23:13 on 12 May 2007 vs. Chicago Fire).

He became a permanent resident of Canada in April 2009. In mid-2009, he began working with the Toronto FC Academy.

== Managerial career ==
Following the firing of head coach Preki in September 2010, Nick Dasovic was named interim head coach, and Dichio became an assistant coach. With new management put in place during the off-season in 2011, Aron Winter as head coach and Bob de Klerk as his assistant named Dichio as the new head coach of the TFC Academy U-18 team that competed in the Canadian Soccer League's first division. Dichio replaced former coach Jason Bent, who was with the academy for three years before being promoted as Winter's second assistant. After the conclusion of the 2012 season, he was nominated for the division's coach of the year.

In 2021, he served as an assistant coach with Toronto FC II and was also named to the coaching staff for the Canada national team. He announced his departure from the Toronto FC organization after the 2021 season.

In 2022, he joined the coaching staff of Mark Briggs as an assistant coach for the Sacramento Republic in the USL Championship.

On 29 November 2023, Dichio was officially appointed as the new manager for USL Championship club Detroit City, replacing Trevor James, who remained with the club as the sporting director.

== Trivia ==
Fans of Dichio's former club, Toronto FC, chant his name in the 24th minute of every home match, a reference to the fact that he scored the club's first ever goal in the 24th minute of play of a MLS match against Chicago in May 2007.

== Honours ==
Sunderland

- Football League First Division: 1998–99
