= 2010 Toronto FC season =

Toronto FC 2010 soccer season

Toronto FC
2010 season
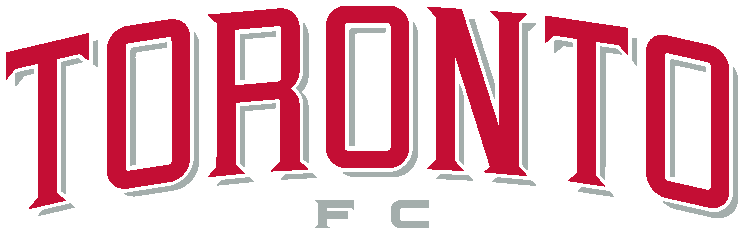
- Head coach: Preki (until September 14); Nick Dasovic (interim, from September 14)
- Stadium: BMO Field
- Major League Soccer: Conference: 5th Overall: 11th
- MLS Cup playoffs: Did not qualify
- Canadian Championship: Winners
- CONCACAF Champions League: Group stage
- Top goalscorer: League: Dwayne De Rosario (15); All: Dwayne De Rosario (17)
- Highest home attendance: League: 22,108; All: 22,108
- Average home league attendance: League: 20,453; All: 19,049
Home colours	Away colours	Third colours

The 2010 MLS season was the fourth season in Toronto FC's existence. The club was looking to make the playoffs for the first time in their history, but ultimately fell short.

TFC started the season with Preki as the new head coach; however, on September 14, he along with Director of Soccer Mo Johnston, were relieved of their duties, and Nick Dasovic took over as head coach on an interim basis for the rest of the season.

== Club ==
=== Coaching staff ===
Position	Staff
Interim Director of Soccer	(Canada) Earl Cochrane
Interim Head Coach	(Canada) Nick Dasovic
Assistant Coach	(Uruguay) Leo Percovich
Assistant Coach	(England) Danny Dichio
Goalkeeping Coach	(Canada) Mike Toshack

Last updated: September 14, 2010
Source: Toronto FC

== Squad ==
As of October 10, 2010.

Note: Flags indicate national team as defined under FIFA eligibility rules; some limited exceptions apply. Players may hold more than one non-FIFA nationality.

No.	Pos.	Nation	Player
1	GK	USA	Jon Conway
3	DF	CAN	Nana Attakora
4	DF	USA	Nick Garcia
6	MF	CAN	Julian de Guzman
7	FW	USA	Fuad Ibrahim
8	DF	USA	Dan Gargan
10	FW	ESP	Mista
12	DF	CAN	Adrian Cann
14	MF	CAN	Dwayne De Rosario (captain)
15	MF	CMR	Joseph Nane
17	FW	JAM	O'Brian White
19	FW	USA	Chad Barrett
20	DF	USA	Ty Harden

No.	Pos.	Nation	Player
21	MF	USA	Nick LaBrocca
22	MF	GAM	Amadou Sanyang
23	MF	USA	Jacob Peterson
24	GK	SUI	Stefan Frei
25	MF	ARG	Martin Šarić
27	MF	CAN	Gabe Gala
28	DF	CAN	Doneil Henry
29	FW	BRA	Maicon Santos
30	GK	SRB	Miloš Kočić (on loan to Serbian White Eagles)
32	DF	GAM	Emmanuel Gomez
33	DF	RUS	Maxim Usanov
34	DF	LAT	Raivis Hščanovičs
37	FW	CAN	Nicholas Lindsay

=== Transfers ===
==== In ====
Note: Flags indicate national team as defined under FIFA eligibility rules; some limited exceptions apply. Players may hold more than one non-FIFA nationality.

No.	Pos.	Nation	Player
5	DF	USA	Zachary Herold (2nd round (24th overall) pick in the 2010 MLS SuperDraft)
23	MF	USA	Jacob Peterson (from Colorado Rapids, trade)
20	DF	USA	Ty Harden (from Colorado Rapids, trade)
21	MF	USA	Nick LaBrocca (from Colorado Rapids, trade)
25	MF	ARG	Martin Šarić (free agent)
1	GK	USA	Jon Conway (free agent)
8	DF	USA	Dan Gargan (free agent)
15	MF	CMR	Joseph Nane (4th round (53rd overall) pick in 2010 MLS SuperDraft)

No.	Pos.	Nation	Player
30	GK	SRB	Miloš Kočić (free agent)
34	DF	LAT	Raivis Hščanovičs (free agent)
33	DF	RUS	Maxim Usanov (free agent)
12	DF	CAN	Adrian Cann (free agent)
10	FW	ESP	Mista (free agent)
29	FW	BRA	Maicon Santos (free agent)
28	DF	CAN	Doneil Henry (TFC Academy graduate)
37	FW	CAN	Nicholas Lindsay (TFC Academy graduate)

==== Out ====
Note: Flags indicate national team as defined under FIFA eligibility rules; some limited exceptions apply. Players may hold more than one non-FIFA nationality.

No.	Pos.	Nation	Player
20	MF	HON	Amado Guevara (to C.D. Motagua, contract expired)
8	FW	ARG	Pablo Vitti (to Universidad San Martín de Porres, loan expired)
5	DF	HAI	Lesly Fellinga (contract expired)
33	MF	WAL	Carl Robinson (to New York Red Bulls, trade)
15	DF	CAN	Adrian Serioux (to Houston Dynamo, trade)
16	DF	USA	Marvell Wynne (to Colorado Rapids, trade)

No.	Pos.	Nation	Player
18	GK	USA	Brian Edwards (waived)
10	FW	CAN	Ali Gerba (waived)
11	DF	CAN	Jim Brennan (retired)
5	DF	USA	Zachary Herold (retired)
2	MF	USA	Sam Cronin (to San Jose Earthquakes)

== Competitions ==
Updated to games played October 23, 2010.

=== Regular season ===
==== Standings ====
Conference

Pos	Team	Pld	W	L	T	GF	GA	GD	Pts	Qualification
1	New York Red Bulls	30	15	9	6	38	29	+9	51	Qualification for the conference semifinals
2	Columbus Crew	30	14	8	8	40	34	+6	50	Qualification for the conference semifinals
3	Kansas City Wizards	30	11	13	6	36	35	+1	39	
4	Chicago Fire	30	9	12	9	37	38	−1	36	
5	Toronto FC	30	9	13	8	33	41	−8	35	
6	New England Revolution	30	9	16	5	32	50	−18	32	
7	Philadelphia Union	30	8	15	7	35	49	−14	31	
8	D.C. United	30	6	20	4	21	47	−26	22	

Source: MLS

Overall

Pos	Team	Pld	W	L	T	GF	GA	GD	Pts	
1	LA Galaxy (S)	30	18	7	5	44	26	+18	59	Qualification for the CONCACAF Champions League
2	Real Salt Lake	30	15	4	11	45	20	+25	56	
3	New York Red Bulls	30	15	9	6	38	29	+9	51	
4	FC Dallas	30	12	4	14	42	28	+14	50	Qualification for the CONCACAF Champions League
5	Columbus Crew	30	14	8	8	40	34	+6	50	
6	Seattle Sounders FC (U)	30	14	10	6	39	35	+4	48	Qualification for the CONCACAF Champions League
7	Colorado Rapids (C)	30	12	8	10	44	32	+12	46	Qualification for the CONCACAF Champions League
8	San Jose Earthquakes	30	13	10	7	34	33	+1	46	
9	Kansas City Wizards	30	11	13	6	36	35	+1	39	
10	Chicago Fire	30	9	12	9	37	38	−1	36	
11	Toronto FC (V)	30	9	13	8	33	41	−8	35	Qualification for the CONCACAF Champions League
12	Houston Dynamo	30	9	15	6	40	49	−9	33	
13	New England Revolution	30	9	16	5	32	50	−18	32	
14	Philadelphia Union	30	8	15	7	35	49	−14	31	
15	Chivas USA	30	8	18	4	31	45	−14	28	
16	D.C. United	30	6	20	4	21	47	−26	22	

Source: MLS
Rules for classification: 1) points; 2) head-to-head record; 3) goal difference; 4) number of goals scored
(C) MLS Cup champions; (S) Supporters' Shield winners; (U) U.S. Open Cup winners; (V) Canadian Championship winners

==== Results summary ====
Overall								Home						Away					
Pld	Pts	W	L	T	GF	GA	GD	W	L	T	GF	GA	GD	W	L	T	GF	GA	GD
30	35	9	13	8	33	41	−8	6	3	6	19	15	+4	3	10	2	14	26	−12

Last updated: October 23, 2010
Source: 2010 Major League Soccer season
Pld = Matches played; Pts = Points; W = Matches won; T = Matches tied; L = Matches lost; GF = Goals for; GA = Goals against; GD = Goal difference

==== Results by round ====
Round	1	2	3	4	5	6	7	8	9	10	11	12	13	14	15	16	17	18	19	20	21	22	23	24	25	26	27	28	29	30
Ground	A	A	H	A	H	A	H	A	H	A	H	H	H	H	A	H	A	H	A	H	H	A	A	H	A	H	A	A	H	A
Result	L	L	W	L	W	L	W	T	W	W	T	T	T	W	L	T	L	W	L	L	T	L	T	L	W	L	L	L	T	W
Position	13	15	13	15	12	14	11	10	8	7	6	7	7	8	8	7	8	7	8	9	9	10	10	10	10	10	11	11	11	11

Updated to match(es) played on October 23, 2010. Source: Regular season matches
A = Away; H = Home; W = Win; L = Loss; T = Tie

=== Canadian Championship ===
Pos	Team	Pld	W	D	L	GF	GA	GD	Pts	Qualification	TOR	VAN	MTL
1	Toronto FC (C)	4	2	2	0	3	0	+3	8	Champions League	—	0–0	2–0
2	Vancouver Whitecaps	4	0	4	0	2	2	0	4		0–0	—	1–1
3	Montreal Impact	4	0	2	2	2	5	−3	2		0–1	1–1	—

Source: Canada Soccer
(C) Champions

=== CONCACAF Champions League ===
==== Group stage standings ====
Team	Pld	W	D	L	GF	GA	GD	Pts
(United States) Real Salt Lake	6	4	1	1	17	11	+6	13
(Mexico) Cruz Azul	6	3	1	2	15	9	+6	10
(Canada) Toronto FC	6	2	2	2	5	7	-2	8
(Panama) Árabe Unido	6	1	0	4	4	14	-10	3

== Matches ==
=== Preseason ===
Win Draw Loss

February 11, 2010	Toronto FC	1–1	UCF Knights	Bradenton, Florida, United States
	Dan Gargan 80'	(report)		Stadium: IMG Academy

February 14, 2010	Toronto FC	1–0	South Florida Bulls	Bradenton, Florida, United States
	Vincent Kayizzi 37'	(report)		Stadium: IMG Academy

February 17, 2010	Toronto FC	0–0	D.C. United	Bradenton, Florida, United States
		(report)		Stadium: IMG Academy

==== 2010 Walt Disney World Pro Soccer Classic ====
February 25, 2010	Toronto FC	1–0	FC Dallas	Orlando, Florida, United States
	Vincent Kayizzi 16'	(report)		Stadium: ESPN Wide World of Sports Complex

February 27, 2010	Toronto FC	0–4	New York Red Bulls	Orlando, Florida, United States
		(report)	Juan Pablo Angel 32'; Juan Pablo Angel 37'; Juan Pablo Angel 49'; Conor Chinn 85'	Stadium: ESPN Wide World of Sports Complex

==== 2010 Carolina Challenge Cup ====
March 13, 2010	Toronto FC	0–0	Charleston Battery	Charleston, South Carolina, United States
		(report)		Stadium: Blackbaud Stadium

March 17, 2010	Toronto FC	0–1	D.C. United	Charleston, South Carolina, United States
	Amadou Sanyang (red card) 27'	(report)	Jaime Moreno 62'	Stadium: Blackbaud Stadium

March 20, 2010	Toronto FC	0–1	Real Salt Lake	Charleston, South Carolina, United States
			Saborio 56'	Stadium: Blackbaud Stadium

=== Major League Soccer regular season ===
March 27, 2010	Columbus Crew	2–0	Toronto FC	Columbus, Ohio, United States
	Iro 29'; Schelotto 89'; Moffat (yellow card) 92+'	(report)	Šarić (yellow card) 23'; Attakora (yellow card) 77'	Stadium: Columbus Crew Stadium; Attendance: 13,536; Referee: Mark Geiger

April 10, 2010	New England Revolution	4–1	Toronto FC	Foxborough, Massachusetts, United States
	Schilawski 47'; Schilawski 51'; Schilawski 58'; Nyassi 66'	(report)	Hščanovičs (yellow card) 11'; De Rosario 28' de Guzman (yellow card) 85'	Stadium: Gillette Stadium; Attendance: 12,798; Referee: Alex Prus

April 15, 2010	Toronto FC	2–1	Philadelphia Union	Toronto, Ontario, Canada
	Hščanovičs (yellow card) 16'; Usanov (yellow card) 25'; De Rosario 35'; De Rosario 81' (pen.)	(Report)	Califf (red card) 34'; Miglioranzi (yellow card) 38'; Harvey 46+'; Thomas (yellow card) 57'	Stadium: BMO Field; Attendance: 21,978; Referee: Baldomero Toledo

April 18, 2010	Colorado Rapids	3–1	Toronto FC	Commerce City, Colorado, United States
	Casey 24' (pen.); Larentowicz 71'; Casey 85' (pen.)	(report)	Šarić (yellow card) 45'; De Rosario 58' (pen.); Usanov (yellow card) 84'	Stadium: Dick's Sporting Goods Park; Attendance: 9,928; Referee: Ricardo Salazar

April 25, 2010	Toronto FC	2–0	Seattle Sounders FC	Toronto, Ontario, Canada
	Šarić (yellow card) 14'; Usanov (yellow card) 17'; Cann (yellow card) 52'; De Rosario 58'; White 76'	(report)	Nyassi (yellow card) 41'	Stadium: BMO Field; Attendance: 18,394; Referee: Jorge Gonzalez

May 1, 2010	Real Salt Lake	2–1	Toronto FC	Sandy, Utah, United States
	Olave 14'; Saborio (yellow card) 21'; Williams 42'; Warner (yellow card) 47+'; Olave (yellow card) 50'	(report)	Attakora (yellow card) 49' de Guzman (yellow card) 61'; LaBrocca (yellow card) 73'; De Rosario 88' (pen.)	Stadium: Rio Tinto Stadium; Attendance: 12,659; Referee: Kevin Stott

May 8, 2010	Toronto FC	4–1	Chicago Fire	Toronto, Ontario, Canada
	LaBrocca 24' de Guzman (yellow card) 40'; White 47'; Barrett 66'; Barrett 69'; Cann (yellow card) 74'	(report)	Pause 50'	Stadium: BMO Field; Attendance: 20,060; Referee: Terry Vaughn

May 15, 2010	Los Angeles Galaxy	0–0	Toronto FC	Carson, California, United States
	Gonzalez (yellow card) 50'	(report)	Usanov (yellow card) 61' (yellow-red card) 94+'	Stadium: The Home Depot Center; Attendance: 20,007; Referee: Jair Marrufo

May 22, 2010	Toronto FC	1–0	New England Revolution	Toronto, Ontario, Canada
	Šarić (yellow card) 7'; Barrett 53'; Barrett (yellow card) 58'; Gargan (yellow card) 75'	(report)	Joseph (yellow card) 25'; Perovic (yellow card) 75'	Stadium: BMO Field; Attendance: 20,672; Referee: Michael Kennedy

May 29, 2010	San Jose Earthquakes	1–3	Toronto FC	Santa Clara, California, United States
	Burling (yellow card) 58'; Corrales 76'	(report)	Šarić (yellow card) 8'; Barrett 31'; Barrett (yellow card) 31'; De Rosario 66' de Guzman (yellow card) 93+'; De Rosario 94+'	Stadium: Buck Shaw Stadium; Attendance: 10,214; Referee: Jorge Gonzalez

June 5, 2010	Toronto FC	0–0	Kansas City Wizards	Toronto, Ontario, Canada
	Garcia (red card) 27'; De Rosario (yellow card) 46+'	(report)	Rocastle (yellow card) 35' (yellow-red card) 57'	Stadium: BMO Field; Attendance: 21,583; Referee: Baldomero Toledo

June 26, 2010	Toronto FC	0–0	Los Angeles Galaxy	Toronto, Ontario, Canada
		(report)		Stadium: BMO Field; Attendance: 18,809; Referee: Alex Prus

July 1, 2010	Toronto FC	1–1	Houston Dynamo	Toronto, Ontario, Canada
	Garcia (yellow card) 59'; Attakora (yellow card) 63' de Guzman (red card) 63'; Gargan 84'; Gargan (yellow card) 85'; Sanyang (yellow card) 53' (yellow-red card) 94+'	(report)	Ngwenya (red card) 62'; Ching 72'	Stadium: BMO Field; Attendance: 21,374; Referee: Jair Marrufo

July 10, 2010	Toronto FC	1–0	Colorado Rapids	Toronto, Ontario, Canada
	Gargan (yellow card) 20'; Ibrahim 61'	(report)		Stadium: BMO Field; Attendance: 21,836; Referee: Ricardo Salazar

July 17, 2010	Philadelphia Union	2–1	Toronto FC	Chester, Pennsylvania, United States
	Califf (yellow card) 38'; Arrieta (yellow card) 48'; Orozco Fiscal 61'; Le Toux 94+' (pen.)	(report)	Gargan (yellow card) 28'; Barrett 81'	Stadium: PPL Park; Attendance: 17,251; Referee: Ramon Hernandez

July 24, 2010	Toronto FC	1–1	FC Dallas	Toronto, Ontario, Canada
	De Rosario (yellow card) 17'; Sanyang (yellow card) 23'; Cann (yellow card) 39'; Maicon Santos 61'	(report)	Hernández (yellow card) 21'; Rodríguez 77'; Benítez (yellow card) 96+'	Stadium: BMO Field; Attendance: 19,743; Referee: Edvin Jurisevic

July 31, 2010	Kansas City Wizards	1–0	Toronto FC	Kansas City, Kansas, United States
	Bunbury 62'; Bunbury (yellow card) 68'	(report)	Cann (yellow card) 22'; LaBrocca (yellow card) 86'	Stadium: CommunityAmerica Ballpark; Attendance: 10,385; Referee: Abiodun Okulaja

August 7, 2010	Toronto FC	2–1	Chivas USA	Toronto, Ontario, Canada
	Gargan (yellow card) 17'; Attakora 21'; Barrett 32'	(report)	Jazić (yellow card) 14'; Maldonado 65' (pen.)	Stadium: BMO Field; Attendance: 20,648; Referee: Jorge Gonzalez

August 11, 2010	New York Red Bulls	1–0	Toronto FC	Harrison, New Jersey, United States
	Lindpere 23'	(report)	de Guzman (yellow card) 56'; Mista (yellow card) 94+'	Stadium: Red Bull Arena; Attendance: 19,035; Referee: Ricardo Salazar

August 21, 2010	Toronto FC	1–4	New York Red Bulls	Toronto, Ontario, Canada
	De Rosario 49'; Attakora (red card) 60'	(report)	Mendes (yellow card) 14'; Márquez 35'; Márquez (yellow card) 37'; Nane 41' (o.g.); Ángel 61' (pen.); Ibrahim (yellow card) 72'; Robinson 77'	Stadium: BMO Field; Attendance: 22,108; Referee: Jair Marrufo

August 28, 2010	Toronto FC	0–0	Real Salt Lake	Toronto, Ontario, Canada
		(report)	Olave (yellow card) 18'	Stadium: BMO Field; Attendance: 21,047; Referee: Baldomero Toledo

September 4, 2010	FC Dallas	1–0	Toronto FC	Frisco, Texas, United States
	Cunningham 47'; Benitez (yellow card) 91+'	(report)	Šarić (yellow card) 15' (yellow-red card) 89'; LaBrocca (yellow card) 46+'	Stadium: Pizza Hut Park; Attendance: 10,033; Referee: Alex Prus

September 8, 2010	Chicago Fire	0–0	Toronto FC	Bridgeview, Illinois, United States
	Nyarko (yellow card) 68'	(report)	Cann (yellow card) 24' de Guzman (yellow card) 35'; Usanov (yellow card) 69'	Stadium: Toyota Park; Attendance: 12,891; Referee: Ramon Hernandez

September 11, 2010	Toronto FC	0–1	D.C. United	Toronto, Ontario, Canada
	de Guzman (yellow card) 53'	(report)	James 81'	Stadium: BMO Field; Attendance: 20,395; Referee: Michael Kennedy

September 18, 2010	Houston Dynamo	1–2	Toronto FC	Houston, Texas, United States
	Ching 18'; Cameron (yellow card) 79'; Robinson (yellow card) 93+'	(report)	Barrett (yellow card) 29'; Maicon Santos (yellow card) 53'; De Rosario 60'; De Rosario (yellow card) 81'; White (yellow card) 89'; De Rosario 94+'	Stadium: Robertson Stadium; Attendance: 16,435; Referee: Edvin Jurisevic

September 25, 2010	Toronto FC	2–3	San Jose Earthquakes	Toronto, Ontario, Canada
	De Rosario 66'; Maicon Santos 79'; De Rosario (yellow card) 80'	(report)	Wondolowski 3' (pen.); Wondolowski 53'; Wondolowski 67'; Busch (yellow card) 84'	Stadium: BMO Field; Attendance: 20,064; Referee: Kevin Stott

October 2, 2010	Seattle Sounders FC	3–2	Toronto FC	Seattle, Washington, United States
	Zakuani 21'; Nkufo 26'; Nyassi 59'	(report)	De Rosario 16'; Barrett (yellow card) 25'; Gargan (yellow card) 34'; Maicon Santos (yellow card) 63'; Barrett 88'	Stadium: Qwest Field; Attendance: 36,079; Referee: Mark Geiger

October 9, 2010	Chivas USA	3–0	Toronto FC	Carson, California, United States
	Flores 51'; Gordon (yellow card) 74'; Padilla 88'; Espinoza 90'	(report)	De Rosario (yellow card) 81'	Stadium: The Home Depot Center; Attendance: 12,426; Referee: Terry Vaughan

October 16, 2010	Toronto FC	2–2	Columbus Crew	Toronto, Ontario, Canada
	Gargan (yellow card) 21'; Garcia (yellow card) 28'; Maicon Santos 29'; Peterson 38'; Conway (red card) 72'	(report)	Marshall 15'; Iro (yellow card) 51'; Moffatt (yellow card) 61'; Lenhart (red card) 71'; Hesmer 92+'	Stadium: BMO Field; Attendance: 18,084; Referee: Jorge Gonzalez

October 23, 2010	D.C. United	2–3	Toronto FC	Washington D.C. United States
	Quaranta 2'; Moreno 39' (pen.); James (yellow card) 56'	(report)	Maicon Santos 23' de Guzman (yellow card) 38'; De Rosario 48'; Lindsay (yellow card) 63'; De Rosario 65'	Stadium: RFK Memorial Stadium; Attendance: 18,071; Referee: Silviu Petrescu

=== Canadian Championship ===
April 28, 2010	Toronto FC	2–0	Montreal Impact	Toronto, Ontario, Canada
	Harden 12'; Cronin (yellow card) 23' de Guzman (yellow card) 34'; Gargan (yellow card) 56'; Barrett 61'; Frei (yellow card) 80'	(report)	Pizzolitto (yellow card) 24'; Brown (red card) 35'; Braz (yellow card) 45'	Stadium: BMO Field; Attendance: 21,346; Referee: Paul Ward

May 12, 2010	Montreal Impact	0–1	Toronto FC	Montreal, Quebec, Canada
		(report)	Usanov (yellow card) 14'; De Rosario 73'	Stadium: Saputo Stadium; Attendance: 10,737; Referee: David Gantar

May 19, 2010	Vancouver Whitecaps	0–0	Toronto FC	Burnaby, British Columbia, Canada
	De Rosario (yellow card) 21'; Hščanovičs (yellow card) 70'	(report)	Haber (yellow card) 21'; Knight (yellow card) 90'	Stadium: Swangard Stadium; Attendance: 4,928; Referee: Steve Depiero

June 2, 2010	Toronto FC	0–0	Vancouver Whitecaps	Toronto, Ontario, Canada
	Henry (yellow card) 37'; Cronin (yellow card) 45'; Hščanovičs (yellow card) 85'	(report)	Haber (red card) 31'; Bellisomo (yellow card) 34'	Stadium: BMO Field; Attendance: 15,176; Referee: Geoff Gamble

=== CONCACAF Champions League ===
July 27, 2010 Preliminary round	Toronto FC (Canada)	1–0	(Honduras) C.D. Motagua	Toronto, Ontario, Canada
	Barrett 20'; Maicon Santos (yellow card) 51'	(report)	Leverón (yellow card) 79'	Stadium: BMO Field; Attendance: 18,891; Referee: Terry Vaughn

August 3, 2010 Preliminary round	C.D. Motagua (Honduras)	2–2	(Canada) Toronto FC	Tegucigalpa, Honduras
	Guevara 6'; Guevara 64'	(report)	Gargan (yellow card) 14'; De Rosario 59'; Barrett 79'; Peterson (yellow card) 87'; Frei (yellow card) 88'	Stadium: Estadio Tiburcio Carías Andino; Attendance: 8,000; Referee: Luis Rodriguez

August 17, 2010 Group stage	Toronto FC (Canada)	2–1	(Mexico) Cruz Azul	Toronto, Ontario, Canada
	Šarić 3'; Mista 44'; Peterson (yellow card) 73'; De Rosario (yellow card) 93+'	(report)	Gutiérrez (yellow card) 21'; Pinto (yellow card) 76'; Giménez 89'; Giménez (yellow card) 89'; Torrado (yellow card) 93+'	Stadium: BMO Field; Attendance: 16,862; Referee: Courtney Campbell

August 24, 2010 Group stage	C.D. Árabe Unido (Panama)	1–0	(Canada) Toronto FC	La Chorrera, Panama
	Caesar 40'; Londono (yellow card) 41'; Anderson (yellow card) 77'	(report)	LaBrocca (red card) 50'; Usanov (yellow card) 68'; Hščanovičs (yellow card) 71'; Ibrahim (yellow card) 10' (yellow-red card) 87'	Stadium: Estadio Agustín Sánchez; Attendance: 501; Referee: Marlon Mejia

September 15, 2010 Group stage	Real Salt Lake (United States)	4–1	(Canada) Toronto FC	Sandy, Utah, United States
	Beckerman 21'; Olave 40'; Beckerman (yellow card) 49'; Saborío 69' (pen.); Paulo Araujo Jr. 80'	(report)	Maicon Santos 8'; Šarić (yellow card) 44'; Mista (red card) 66'	Stadium: Rio Tinto Stadium; Attendance: 11,579; Referee: Mauricio Morales

September 21, 2010 Group stage	Cruz Azul (Mexico)	0–0	(Canada) Toronto FC	Mexico City, Mexico
	Pinto (yellow card) 50' (yellow-red card) 80'; Torrado (yellow card) 88'	(report)	de Guzman (yellow card) 20'; Ibrahim (yellow card) 50'; Garcia (yellow card) 52'; Lindsay (yellow card) 57'; Conway (yellow card) 78'; Gargan (yellow card) 89'	Stadium: Estadio Azul; Attendance: 5,280; Referee: Juan Carlos Guerra

September 28, 2010 Group stage	Toronto FC (Canada)	1–1	(United States) Real Salt Lake	Toronto, Ontario, Canada
	Peterson 20'; Usanov (yellow card) 53'	(report)	Warner (yellow card) 35'; Beckerman (yellow card) 61'; Morales 67'	Stadium: BMO Field; Attendance: 10,581; Referee: Trevor Taylor

October 19, 2010 Group stage	Toronto FC (Canada)	1–0	(Panama) C.D. Árabe Unido	Toronto, Ontario, Canada
	Attakora 30'; Garcia (yellow card) 33'; Henry (yellow card) 62'; Gargan (yellow card) 81'; Morgan (yellow card) 89'	(report)	Londono (yellow card) 40'; Caesar (yellow card) 62'; Gondola (yellow card) 90'	Stadium: BMO Field; Attendance: 10,385; Referee: Roberto Garcia Orozco

=== Mid-season friendly ===
April 3, 2010	Toronto FC	0–0	Rochester Rhinos	Oakville, Ontario, Canada
		(report)		Stadium: Oakville Soccer Centre; Attendance: closed

July 21, 2010	Toronto FC (Canada)	1–1 (a.e.t.) (3–4 p)	(England) Bolton Wanderers FC	Toronto, Ontario, Canada
	Maicon Santos 46+'	(report)	Taylor 28'	Stadium: BMO Field; Attendance: 19,507
	Penalties
	Gala (penalty scored); Hščanovičs (penalty missed); White (penalty scored); Lindsay (penalty scored); Cordon (penalty missed)		(penalty missed) Steinsson; (penalty scored) Holden; (penalty scored) Blake; (penalty scored) Davis; (penalty scored) Cahill

== Squad statistics ==
=== Players ===
				Total				MLS		Canadian Championship		Champions League		
N	Pos.	Name	Nat.	GS	App	Gls	Min	App	Gls	App	Gls	App	Gls	Notes
1	GK	Jon Conway	(United States)	6	6		522	1		1		4		
2	MF	Sam Cronin^{1}	(United States)	7	9		623	6		3				No longer with the team
3	DF	Nana Attakora	(Canada)	32	33	2	2738	25	1	2		6	1	
4	DF	Nick Garcia	(United States)	28	32		2525	23		3		6		
5	DF	Zachary Herold^{1}	(United States)											No longer with the team
6	MF	Julian de Guzman	(Canada)	32	36		2935	25		3		8		
7	FW	Fuad Ibrahim	(United States)	7	13	1	632	8	1	1		4		
8	DF	Dan Gargan	(United States)	31	36	1	2882	27	1	2		7		
10	FW	Mista	(Spain)	6	14	1	679	9				5	1	
11	DF	Jim Brennan^{1}	(Canada)	1	1		90	1						No longer with the team
12	DF	Adrian Cann	(Canada)	35	35		3150	26		3		6		
14	MF	Dwayne De Rosario	(Canada)	33	39	17	3154	27	15	4	1	8	1	
15	MF	Joseph Nane	(Cameroon)	12	17		856	11		1		5		
17	FW	O'Brian White	(Jamaica)	15	34	2	1592	24	2	3		7		
19	FW	Chad Barrett	(United States)	21	30	10	1920	23	7	3	1	4	2	
20	DF	Ty Harden	(United States)	15	18	1	1398	12		2	1	4		
21	MF	Nick LaBrocca	(United States)	30	36	1	2713	28	1	3		5		
22	MF	Amadou Sanyang	(The Gambia)	13	15		999	13		2				
23	MF	Jacob Peterson	(United States)	20	31	2	1676	24	1	1		6	1	
24	GK	Stefan Frei	(Switzerland)	33	33		2970	28		2		3		
25	MF	Martin Šarić	(Argentina)	20	24	1	1552	17		3		4	1	
26	MF	Oscar Cordon	(Canada)		1		24					1		
27	MF	Gabe Gala	(Canada)	6	15		639	10		4		1		
28	DF	Doneil Henry	(Canada)	3	4		213	1		1		2		
29	FW	Maicon Santos	(Brazil)	12	17	5	1141	13	4			4	1	
30	GK	Miloš Kočić	(Serbia)	3	4		287	2		1		1		
32	DF	Emmanuel Gomez	(The Gambia)											
33	DF	Maxim Usanov	(Russia)	19	21		1551	14		3		4		
34	DF	Raivis Hščanovičs	(Latvia)	15	17		1275	11		3		3		
35	FW	Allando Matheson	(Canada)	1	1		66			1				
36	DF	Ashtone Morgan	(Canada)	1	1		90					1		
37	FW	Nicholas Lindsay	(Canada)	4	8		468	4		1		3		

Last updated: October 23
Source: Competitive matches
Ordered by number
0 shown as blank

=== Disciplinary records ===
N	Pos.	Nat.	Name	Yellow card	Second yellow card	Red card	Notes
1	GK	(United States)	Jon Conway	1		1	
2	MF	(United States)	Sam Cronin^{1}	2			
3	DF	(Canada)	Nana Attakora	3		1	
4	DF	(United States)	Nick Garcia	4		1	
6	MF	(Canada)	Julian de Guzman	10		1	
7	FW	(United States)	Fuad Ibrahim	1	1		
8	DF	(United States)	Dan Gargan	11			
10	FW	(Spain)	Mista	1		1	
12	DF	(Canada)	Adrian Cann	5			
14	MF	(Canada)	Dwayne De Rosario	7			
17	FW	(Jamaica)	O'Brian White	1			
19	FW	(United States)	Chad Barrett	4			
21	MF	(United States)	Nick LaBrocca	3		1	
22	MF	(The Gambia)	Amadou Sanyang	1	1		
23	MF	(United States)	Jacob Peterson	2			
24	GK	(Switzerland)	Stefan Frei	2			
25	MF	(Argentina)	Martin Šarić	6	1		
28	DF	(Canada)	Doneil Henry	2			
29	FW	(Brazil)	Maicon Santos	3			
33	DF	(Russia)	Maxim Usanov	7	1		
34	DF	(Latvia)	Raivis Hščanovičs	5			
36	DF	(Canada)	Ashtone Morgan	1			
37	FW	(Canada)	Nicholas Lindsay	2			

Last updated: October 23
Source: Competitive matches
Only competitive matches
(yellow card) = Number of bookings; (second yellow card) = Number of sending offs after a second yellow card; (red card) = Number of sending offs by a direct red card.

^{1}Player is no longer with team
