= Mirko Šarić =

Argentine footballer

- Saric during a photo session in 1998

Personal information
- Date of birth: 6 June 1978
- Place of birth: Buenos Aires, Argentina
- Date of death: 4 April 2000 (aged 21)
- Place of death: Flores, Buenos Aires, Argentina
- Height: 1.88 m (6 ft 2 in)
- Position: Midfielder

Youth career
- San Lorenzo

Senior career*
Years	Team	Apps	(Gls)
1996–2000	San Lorenzo	41	(4)
Total		41	(4)

International career
	Argentina U23	7	(2)
- * Club domestic league appearances and goals

Mirko Šarić (6 June 1978 – 4 April 2000) was an Argentine footballer who played as a midfielder for San Lorenzo de Almagro. Following his debut with the professional team in 1996, he was regarded as one of the most promising youth players in Argentine football.

== Club career ==
Šarić was born in Buenos Aires to Croatian parents. He joined the academy of San Lorenzo at a young age, and quickly progressed to make his first team debut in December 1996.

He was seen as one of Argentina's top youth prospects, and had been linked to Spanish giants Real Madrid before his death. After a promising start to his career, a decline in form after being played out of position led to him appearing more as a substitute. In December 1999, while playing in a reserve game against River Plate, Šarić suffered ruptured ligaments in his left knee, which kept him sidelined until his death in 2000.

Saric's last official match was on December the 3rd of 1999 against Vélez Sarsfield. He replaced Walter Erviti on 60'.

== Personal life ==
His brother, Martin, was also a professional footballer until his retirement in 2011. He currently works as a coach for San Lorenzo.

Šarić had been dating a local woman for almost a year, and during this time she had fallen pregnant. Both Šarić and his mother had suspicions that he was not the father, backed up by the fact that Šarić had been on youth international duty with Argentina in Japan at the apparent date of conception. At his mother's advice, Šarić paid for a DNA test for himself and the baby, which came back negative.

Šarić suffered with depression, which contributed to his death. He had expressed this to San Lorenzo manager Oscar Ruggeri, and was receiving psychiatric help.

== Death ==
On the morning of 4 April 2000, Šarić's mother found him dead in his room. He died by suicide.
