= Stefan Frei =

Swiss footballer (born 1986)

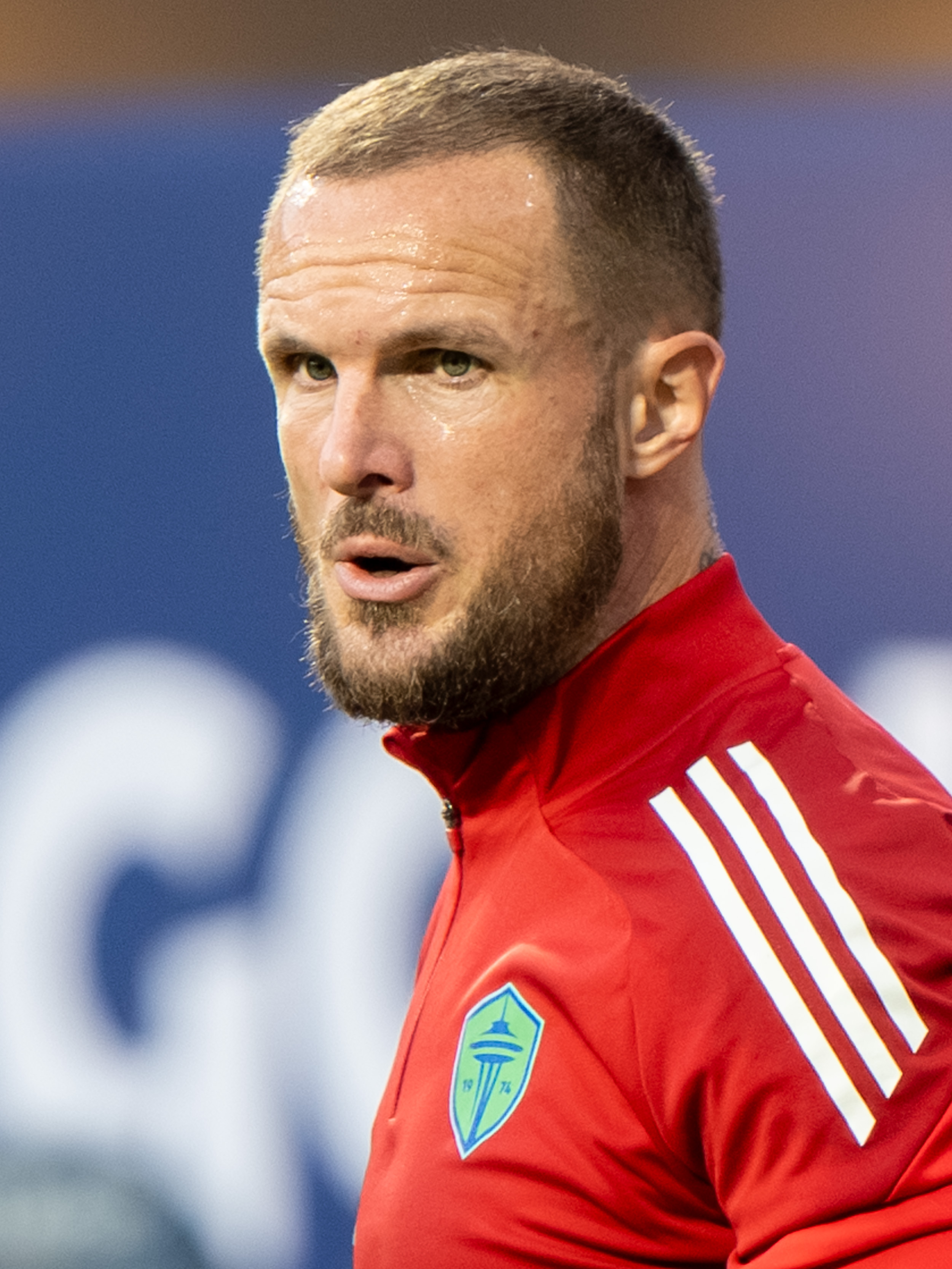
- Frei with Seattle Sounders FC in 2025

Personal information
- Full name: Stefan Frei
- Date of birth: 20 April 1986 (age 40)
- Place of birth: Altstätten, Switzerland
- Height: 6 ft 3 in (1.91 m)
- Position: Goalkeeper

Team information
- Current team: Seattle Sounders FC
- Number: 24

College career
Years	Team	Apps	(Gls)
2005–2008	California Golden Bears	47	(0)

Senior career*
Years	Team	Apps	(Gls)
2006	San Francisco Seals	6	(0)
2007–2008	San Jose Frogs	18	(0)
2009–2013	Toronto FC	82	(0)
2014–	Seattle Sounders FC	351	(0)

International career
2001	Switzerland U15	1	(0)
- * Club domestic league appearances and goals as of 18 October 2025

Stefan Frei (born 20 April 1986) is a Swiss professional footballer who plays as a goalkeeper for Major League Soccer club Seattle Sounders FC. Born in Switzerland, Frei moved with his family to the United States as a teenager. He has spent his entire professional career playing in Major League Soccer.

== Youth and college ==
Frei moved from Switzerland to the United States with his parents and brother in the late 1990s at the age of 15. He attended De La Salle High School in Concord, California.

He played college soccer at the University of California, Berkeley. In 2008, he was named to the All-Pac-10 first team and the NSCAA Far West All-Region team, and was also named to Top Drawer Soccer's Team of the Season. During his college years, Frei also played with both San Francisco Seals and San Jose Frogs in the USL Premier Development League.

== Club career ==
=== Toronto FC ===
Frei was named MVP at the 2009 MLS Player Combine in Fort Lauderdale, Florida, and signed a Generation Adidas contract. He was drafted in the first round (13th overall) of the 2009 MLS SuperDraft by Toronto FC.

He made his professional debut on 21 March 2009, in Toronto's first game of the 2009 MLS season against Kansas City Wizards, and soon established himself as the team's first choice goalkeeper. Shortly after, Frei was named Toronto FC Player of the Month for April 2009. Frei also won MLS's Save of the Week for week 15 and then three times consecutively for weeks 24, 25 and 26 of the 2009 season.

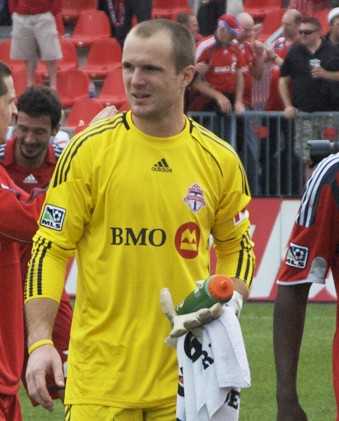
Frei with Toronto FC in 2010

He played in three games of the 2009 Canadian Championship, going 3–0 and ultimately making key saves in the deciding game that ensured Toronto FC would win by at least four goals on goal differential and their first trophy.

On 25 April 2010, Frei picked up his first clean sheet of the 2010 season in a 2–0 home win over Seattle Sounders FC. Frei had another standout season as Toronto's first choice keeper. He finished the season with a 1.32 goals-against average and a 70% save percentage, improving all statistics from his rookie season. It was announced on 18 November 2010 that Frei would graduate from the MLS Generation Adidas program at the end of the 2010 season.

In January 2011, newly hired coach Aron Winter stated in an interview that Julian De Guzman, Dwayne De Rosario and Stefan would be the key players of the upcoming season and he was impressed with Frei's abilities. Frei recorded his first clean sheet of the 2011 season in the second game of the year in a 2–0 home victory over Portland Timbers on 26 March. Frei also earned his third assist since playing with Toronto setting up the second goal for Javier Martina; it was later awarded the Goal of the Week in MLS. Following the departure of Toronto captain Dwayne De Rosario in early April, Coach Winter named Maicon Santos as the replacement captain while Frei would become vice captain. On 13 April against Los Angeles Galaxy, Frei wore the captain's armband for the first time with Toronto due to an injury to Santos; the game ended in a 0–0 home draw. Frei started most games in the first half of 2011 but faced some injuries; after resting a few games, backup keeper Miloš Kocić strung together several strong performances, creating a highly competitive environment at the position. At the end of the season it was announced that Frei would be training with Liverpool, and return to Toronto before pre-season training.

After making his season debut against Los Angeles Galaxy on 7 March in the 2011–12 CONCACAF Champions League quarterfinals first leg, Frei sat out the second leg with Kocić being given the start. Much speculation began to arise with rumors of Frei being traded; however, the following week he sustained a broken fibula during training. Two weeks later the club announced that Frei would have to undergo surgery to repair ligaments in his left ankle and was expected to be out for four to six months, putting his entire season in jeopardy.

Following a year of recovery, Frei entered the 2013 pre-season as the first choice keeper. However, he suffered a minor injury in training allowing back-up Joe Bendik to start in the season opener. Bendik continued to put in strong performances, forcing coach Ryan Nelsen to stick with him. Frei earned his first start in over a year in a Canadian Championship match against Montreal Impact on 24 April 2013; the game ended in a 2–0 home victory for Toronto.

=== Seattle Sounders FC ===
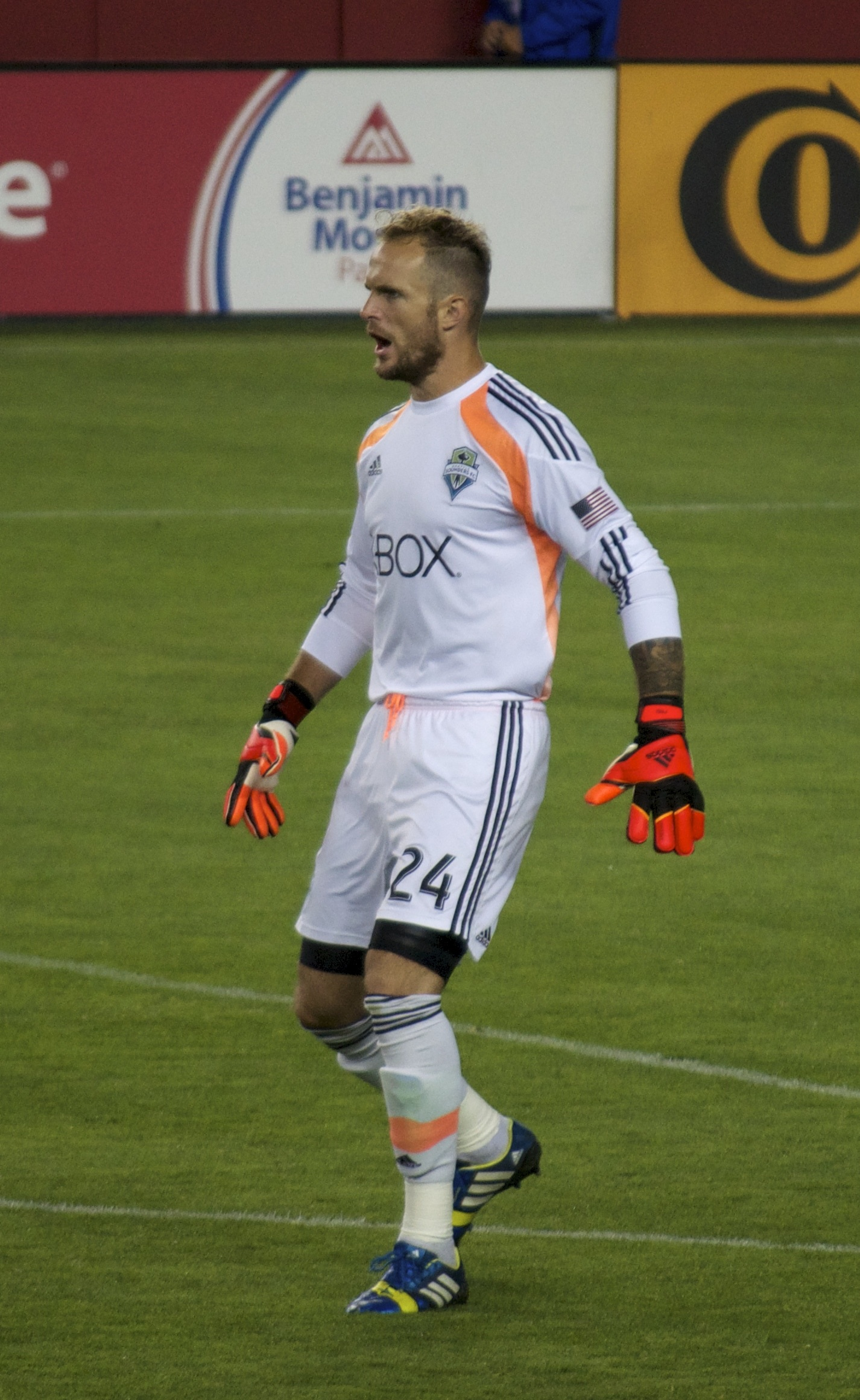
Frei playing for Seattle Sounders FC in 2014.

Frei was traded to Seattle Sounders FC on 10 December 2013 in exchange for a conditional pick in the 2015 MLS SuperDraft.

Frei was one of the best goalkeepers in the league during the 2016 MLS season, keeping eight clean sheets in 33 appearances (the joint fourth-most kept by a goalkeeper that season), as Seattle qualified for the playoffs after finishing fourth in the Western Conference. He only conceded three goals in the MLS Cup playoffs, keeping four clean sheets in six postseason matches. Frei was named MLS Cup 2016 MVP after making seven saves in regular play, and another in the 5–4 penalty shoot-out victory in the final against his former club, Toronto, following a 0–0 draw after extra time; his decisive save on Jozy Altidore's header in the second half of extra-time was later described by the MLSSoccer.com reporter Sam Stejskal as "one of the best saves in MLS Cup history."

Throughout the 2017 MLS season, Frei confirmed himself as one of the league's best goalkeepers once again: he started 33 games throughout the regular season, making 84 saves over the course of the year for a 69.4 per cent save percentage, and averaging 1.09 goals against per game, while also managing to keep 13 clean sheets, more than any other goalkeeper. In the playoffs, Frei only made four saves en route to the MLS Cup final, but kept four consecutive clean sheets, as Seattle reached the final without conceding a goal. On 9 December 2017, he started in the 2017 MLS Cup final against his former club Toronto FC at BMO Field, a rematch of the previous season's final; Toronto won the match 2–0 to complete an unprecedented treble of the MLS Cup, the Supporters' Shield, and the Canadian Championship, but Frei drew praise in the media for his performance throughout the match, following a string of impressive saves to keep the score level at half time, and made nine stops overall within the first hour of play. He finished in third place in the MLS Goalkeeper of the Year Award, behind Tim Melia and Andre Blake. The following year, he placed second in the award, behind only Zack Steffen.

On 10 November 2019, Frei started for Seattle in the 2019 MLS Cup Final, which ended in a 3–1 home win over Toronto FC.

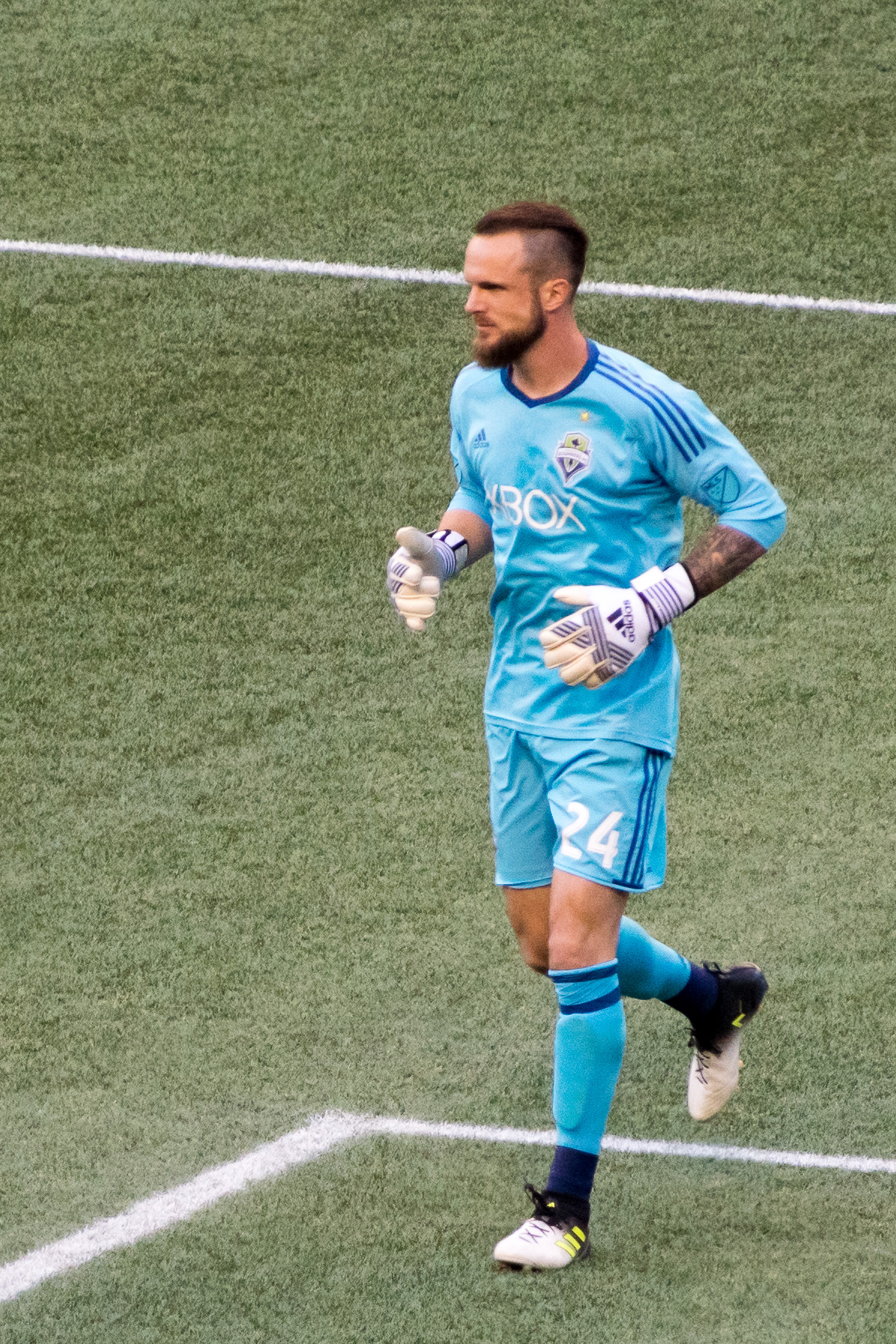
Frei in July 2017

On 12 May 2021, Frei suffered a left knee injury in the 90th minute of an eventual 1−0 victory over the San Jose Earthquakes. The club later announced that he had developed a blood clot as a complication of the injury and would be "out for an undetermined amount of time" during the 2021 season. Frei returned to the starting roster on 11 September, playing in a 1−0 win over Minnesota United FC.

Frei returned to form in the 2022 CONCACAF Champions League. In the competition's semifinal against New York City FC, he recorded seven saves, often at critical point-blank range throughout the match. After defeating Club Universidad Nacional 3–0 in the second leg of the 2022 CONCACAF Champions League Final, Frei received the tournament's Best Player Award and Best Goalkeeper Award. He kept four clean sheets in all eight games he started for Seattle.

On 3 June 2023 against the Portland Timbers, Frei recorded his 100th MLS clean sheet, becoming the third player in league history to do so. He made his 1,000th save for the Sounders in regular season play in a 1–1 home draw with the Columbus Crew on 6 July 2025. During that match, Frei's head collided with the knee of Columbus midfielder Amar Sejdić in stoppage time and was transported by ambulance to a nearby hospital. He was discharged later that evening.

== International career ==
Frei was a member of the Swiss U-15 national team.

In January 2017, Frei was called into camp for the United States national team by Bruce Arena. Frei became a U.S. citizen in June 2017.

== Personal life ==
Stefan is a second-cousin of the retired captain of, and all-time leading scorer for, the Switzerland national football team, Alexander Frei, an accomplished striker twice voted Swiss player of the year, who used to play for Axpo Super League club FC Basel and was the manager for FC Basel.

Frei announced on Twitter that he officially became a U.S. citizen on 13 June 2017. He lives with his wife, Jennifer, and two dogs on Bainbridge Island. Frei began painting in his spare time and has collaborated with companies and charitable organizations for his pieces.

== Career statistics ==
As of match played 12 August 2026

Appearances and goals by club, season and competition
Club	Season	League			Playoffs		National cup (Note: Includes Canadian Championship and U.S. Open Cup)		Continental (Note: All appearances in CONCACAF Champions League/Cup)		Other		Total	
Club	Season	Division	Apps	Goals	Apps	Goals	Apps	Goals	Apps	Goals	Apps	Goals	Apps	Goals
Toronto FC	2009	MLS	26	0	—		3	0	—		—		29	0
Toronto FC	2010	MLS	28	0	—		2	0	2	0	—		32	0
Toronto FC	2011	MLS	27	0	—		4	0	3	0	—		34	0
Toronto FC	2012	MLS	0	0	—		0	0	1	0	—		1	0
Toronto FC	2013	MLS	1	0	—		2	0	—		—		3	0
Toronto FC	Total		82	0	—		11	0	6	0	—		99	0
Seattle Sounders FC	2014	MLS	34	0	4	0	3	0	—		—		41	0
Seattle Sounders FC	2015	MLS	31	0	3	0	0	0	1	0	—		35	0
Seattle Sounders FC	2016	MLS	33	0	6	0	0	0	2	0	—		41	0
Seattle Sounders FC	2017	MLS	33	0	4	0	0	0	—		—		37	0
Seattle Sounders FC	2018	MLS	33	0	2	0	0	0	4	0	—		39	0
Seattle Sounders FC	2019	MLS	34	0	4	0	0	0	—		—		38	0
Seattle Sounders FC	2020	MLS	22 (Note: Includes three appearances in MLS is Back Tournament group stage)	0	4	0	—		2	0	1 (Note: Appearance in MLS is Back Tournament knockout stage)	0	29	0
Seattle Sounders FC	2021	MLS	17	0	1	0	—		—		2 (Note: Appearance(s) in Leagues Cup)	0	20	0
Seattle Sounders FC	2022	MLS	27	0	—		0	0	8	0	0	0	35	0
Seattle Sounders FC	2023	MLS	32	0	4	0	0	0	—		2 (Note: One appearance in FIFA Club World Cup, one appearance in Leagues Cup)	0	38	0
Seattle Sounders FC	2024	MLS	29	0	4	0	0	0	—		1	0	34	0
Seattle Sounders FC	2025	MLS	26	0	3	0	—		3	0	3 (Note: Appearances in FIFA Club World Cup)	0	35	0
Seattle Sounders FC	2026	MLS	0	0	0	0	—		4	0	3	0	7	0
Seattle Sounders FC	Total		351	0	39	0	3	0	24	0	12	0	429	0
Career total			433	0	39	0	14	0	30	0	12	0	528	0

== Honours ==
Toronto FC

- Canadian Championship: 2009, 2010, 2011

Seattle Sounders FC

- MLS Cup: 2016, 2019
- Supporters' Shield: 2014
- U.S. Open Cup: 2014
- CONCACAF Champions League: 2022
- Leagues Cup: 2025

Individual

- NCAA First-Team All-American: 2007
- Red Patch Boys Player of the Year: 2010
- MLS Cup MVP: 2016
- MLS All-Star: 2017
- MLS Save of the Year Award: 2018, 2021
- CONCACAF Champions League Golden Ball: 2022
- CONCACAF Champions League Golden Glove: 2022
- CONCACAF Champions League Best XI: 2022
