= Doudou Touré =

Mauritanian footballer (born 1991)

Personal information
- Full name: Doudou Touré
- Date of birth: December 29, 1991 (age 34)
- Place of birth: Rosso, Mauritania
- Height: 6 ft 2 in (1.88 m)
- Position: Forward

Senior career*
Years	Team	Apps	(Gls)
2008–2009	Monterrey B	8	(0)
2010	Vancouver Whitecaps	5	(0)
2010	Whitecaps Residency	9	(5)
2011	Vancouver Whitecaps FC U-23	3	(0)
2012	Atlanta Red Star	0	(0)
2013–2014	San Luis de Quillota	0	(0)
- * Club domestic league appearances and goals as of May 21, 2011

Doudou Touré (born December 29, 1991) is a Mauritanian professional footballer who plays as a striker.

== Career ==
=== Youth ===
Touré grew up in Nouakchott, before moving to the United States in 1998, settling with his family in Atlanta, Georgia. He attended Joseph Wheeler High School, played junior club soccer with Alpharetta United and Atlanta Fire United.

=== Professional ===
Touré turned professional in 2008, playing with the B team of Mexican side Monterrey. He trialed with Major League Soccer's FC Dallas in April 2008, and was set to sign for the team, but the transaction fell through.

Attended trials with Columbus Crew and the Vancouver Whitecaps in April 2010. He signed a contract with the Whitecaps on May 10, 2010, and spent some time playing with the Vancouver Whitecaps Residency team in the USL Premier Development League, before making his Whitecaps debut on May 26, 2010, in a 2010 Canadian Championship game against Montreal Impact.

== Personal life ==
Doudou's younger brother, Alhagi Touré, played college soccer at George Mason University before transferring to Clayton State University.
