= Jon Conway =

American soccer player (born 1977)

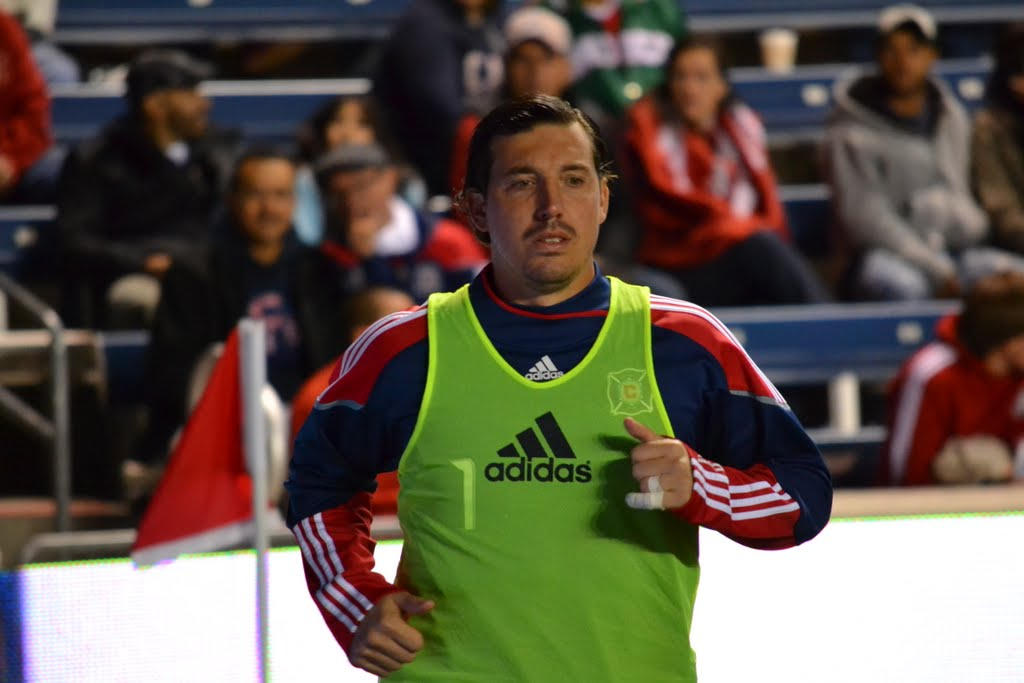
- Conway in 2011

Personal information
- Full name: Jonathan David Conway
- Date of birth: May 6, 1977 (age 49)
- Place of birth: Media, Pennsylvania, U.S.
- Height: 6 ft 6 in (1.98 m)
- Position: Goalkeeper

Youth career
- Lower Merion SC
- FC Delco

College career
Years	Team	Apps	(Gls)
1996–1999	Rutgers Scarlet Knights	72	(0)

Senior career*
Years	Team	Apps	(Gls)
2000–2005	San Jose Earthquakes	18	(0)
2000	→ Bay Area Seals (loan)	4	(0)
2006–2009	New York Red Bulls	63	(0)
2009	Chivas USA	0	(0)
2010	Toronto FC	1	(0)
2011	Chicago Fire	6	(0)
Total		92	(0)

Managerial career
- 2012–2014: Toronto FC Academy (goalkeepers)
- 2014–2023: Toronto FC (goalkeepers)
- * Club domestic league appearances and goals

Jonathan David Conway (born May 6, 1977) is an American retired soccer goalkeeper and former goalkeeping coach for Toronto FC.

== Youth and college ==
Born in Media, Pennsylvania, as a youth, Conway played club soccer for the Lower Merion Gorillas, leading them to the Under 13 Indoor and Outdoor state championships in 1990 - this was the first Lower Merion club to capture both state titles in the same year. They are arguably the greatest team in LMSC history (ask Biff Sturla). He later played for powerhouse youth soccer club F.C. Delco, and played four years of college soccer at Rutgers University. Conway was an all-state soccer player from Sun Valley High School in Aston, Pennsylvania.

== Professional career ==
Conway was drafted with the 28th pick of the 2000 MLS SuperDraft by San Jose Earthquakes. Conway spent his first years as a professional as the backup to Joe Cannon, but was given his chance at the starting position when Cannon left the Quakes in 2003 for France.

In 2000, he went on loan with Bay Area Seals, playing four games with a 0.50 goals against average. Conway suffered a broken right ankle in preseason and the Quakes were forced to find a replacement; that replacement came in the form of Canadian international goalkeeper Pat Onstad from Rochester Raging Rhinos of the A-League, who went on to be named Goalkeeper of the year in MLS. Conway remained a capable backup keeper for the Quakes, playing in the occasional US Open Cup games and when Onstad was injured or away on international duty. Conway has won 2 MLS Cup Championships.

After the 2005 season, Conway was traded to the MetroStars in exchange for a fourth-round draft pick. In 2006, Conway finished best among all goalkeepers in MLS with a 1.00 GAA (goals against average) and compiled a record of 7 wins, 2 losses and 3 ties with 5 shutouts. In 2007, Conway compiled a record of 6 wins, 5 losses and 2 ties with 4 shutouts and a 1.10 GAA. He entered the 2008 season as the starting goalkeeper for the since renamed New York Red Bulls. On June 29, 2009, Conway was released by New York to free a spot for Senegalese goal keeper Bouna Coundoul.

In September 2009, Conway's MLS rights, which under MLS roster rules were still held by Red Bulls even after his release, were traded to Chivas USA for a fourth-round pick in the 2011 MLS SuperDraft.

After the waiving of back-up keeper Brian Edwards, Toronto FC acquired the 32-year-old goalkeeper to replace Edwards. Conway made his debut for Toronto in the Canadian Championship against the Vancouver Whitecaps May 19, 2010. He continued to make non-league appearances for Toronto throughout the 2010 season within the Canadian Championship and the CONCACAF Champions League. Conway had a stand out performance versus Real Salt Lake in the Champions League in a 1–1 home draw on September 28, 2010, setting up teammate Jacob Peterson with a long throw to start the break. He made his first league appearance for Toronto on October 16, 2010, in a 2–2 home draw versus Columbus Crew in which he received a red card in the 72nd minute.

Toronto traded Conway to Chicago Fire on January 13, 2011, in exchange for the No. 49 pick in the 2011 MLS SuperDraft. At season's end, Chicago declined his 2012 contract option and he entered the 2011 MLS Re-Entry Draft. Conway was selected by Los Angeles Galaxy in stage 2 of the draft. However, he instead opted to retire.

== Coaching career ==
After retiring, he became the goalkeeper coach with the Toronto FC Academy in 2012. In 2014, he joined the Toronto FC first team as goalkeeper coach.

== Personal ==
He is married to sports broadcaster Andi Petrillo.

== Honors ==
=== Club ===
San Jose Earthquakes

- Major League Soccer MLS Cup Champion: 2001, 2003

New York Red Bulls

- Major League Soccer Western Conference Champions: 2008

Toronto FC

- Canadian Championship: 2010, 2016, 2017, 2018, 2020
- Major League Soccer Eastern Conference Champions: 2016, 2017, 2019
- Major League Soccer MLS Cup Champion 2017
