= 2010 Canadian Championship =

2010 professional soccer tournament

2010 Nutrilite Canadian Championship (in English) Championnat Canadien Nutrilite 2010 (in French)

Tournament details
- Country: Canada
- Date: April 28 – June 2
- Teams: 3 (from 2 leagues)

Final positions
- Champions: Toronto FC (2nd title)
- Runners-up: Vancouver Whitecaps
- Third place: Montreal Impact

Tournament statistics
- Matches played: 6
- Goals scored: 7 (1.17 per match)
- Attendance: 67,561 (11,260 per match)
- Top goal scorer(s): Seven players (1 goal each)

Awards
- George Gross Memorial Trophy: Dwayne De Rosario

The 2010 Canadian Championship (officially the Nutrilite Canadian Championship for sponsorship reasons) was a soccer tournament hosted and organized by the Canadian Soccer Association that took place in the cities of Montreal, Toronto and Vancouver in 2010. The tournament has been held annually since 2008.

As in previous tournaments, participating teams included the Montreal Impact, Toronto FC and the Vancouver Whitecaps. The tournament consisted of home and away series between each pair of teams for a total of six games. Toronto FC won the tournament, claiming the Voyageurs Cup and Canada's entry into the preliminary round of the 2010–11 CONCACAF Champions League.

All six matches were broadcast in English by Sportsnet.

== Standings ==
Pos	Team	Pld	W	D	L	GF	GA	GD	Pts	Qualification	TOR	VAN	MTL
1	Toronto FC (C)	4	2	2	0	3	0	+3	8	Champions League	—	0–0	2–0
2	Vancouver Whitecaps	4	0	4	0	2	2	0	4		0–0	—	1–1
3	Montreal Impact	4	0	2	2	2	5	−3	2		0–1	1–1	—

Source: Canada Soccer
(C) Champions

== Matches ==
April 28
8:00 pm EDT

Toronto FC	2–0	Montreal Impact
Harden 12'; Barrett 61'	Report

BMO Field, Toronto, Ontario
Attendance: 21,436
Referee: Paul Ward

Toronto FC	Montreal Impact

GK	24	(Switzerland) Stefan Frei	(yellow card) 80'
DF	4	(United States) Nick Garcia		(substituted off) 39'
DF	8	(United States) Dan Gargan	(yellow card) 56'
DF	12	(Canada) Adrian Cann
DF	20	(United States) Ty Harden		(substituted off) 18'
MF	2	(United States) Sam Cronin	(yellow card) 23'
MF	6	(Canada) Julian de Guzman	(yellow card) 34'
MF	23	(United States) Jacob Peterson		(substituted off) 62'
MF	27	(Canada) Gabe Gala
FW	14	(Canada) Dwayne De Rosario (c)
FW	19	(United States) Chad Barrett
Substitutes
DF	34	(Latvia) Raivis Hščanovičs		(substituted on) 18'
FW	17	(Jamaica) O'Brian White		(substituted on) 39'
MF	21	(United States) Nick LaBrocca		(substituted on) 62'
Manager
(United States) Preki

GK	1	(United States) Matt Jordan
DF	3	(Canada) Adam Braz	(yellow card) 45'
DF	5	(Canada) Nevio Pizzolitto (c)	(yellow card) 24'
DF	23	(Jamaica) Stephen DeRoux
DF	26	(France) Cédric Joqueviel
MF	7	(United States) David Testo
MF	8	(Portugal) Filipe Pastel		(substituted off) 42'
MF	11	(Argentina) Leonardo Di Lorenzo		(substituted off) 65'
MF	14	(United States) Tony Donatelli
FW	10	(Panama) Roberto Brown	(red card) 35'
FW	28	(Antigua and Barbuda) Peter Byers		(substituted off) 68'
Substitutes
MF	21	(France) Philippe Billy		(substituted on) 42'
MF	9	(Canada) Rocco Placentino		(substituted on) 65'
FW	12	(Cuba) Eduardo Sebrango		(substituted on) 68'
Manager
(Canada) Marc Dos Santos

Man of the Match
(Canada) Dwayne De Rosario / (Panama) Roberto Brown
Assistant referees
Darren Clark
Joe Fletcher
Fourth official
Justin Tasev

May 5
7:30 pm PDT

Vancouver Whitecaps	1–1	Montreal Impact
Haber 81' (pen.)	Report	Byers 31'

Swangard Stadium, Burnaby, British Columbia
Attendance: 4,325
Referee: Geoff Gamble

Vancouver Whitecaps	Montreal Impact

GK	1	(United States) Jay Nolly
DF	2	(United States) Nelson Akwari
DF	4	(Canada) Chris Williams
DF	14	(United States) Greg Janicki
DF	77	(Georgia (country)) Zourab Tsiskaridze
MF	3	(Canada) Luca Bellisomo	(yellow card) 75'
MF	7	(Canada) Martin Nash (c)
MF	8	(United States) Wes Knight		(substituted off) 75'
MF	16	(Liberia) Ansu Toure		(substituted off) 70'
FW	12	(Northern Ireland) Jonny Steele		(substituted off) 46'
FW	24	(Canada) Marcus Haber
Substitutes
FW	9	(Saint Vincent and the Grenadines) Marlon James		(substituted on) 46'
FW	17	(Canada) Randy Edwini-Bonsu		(substituted on) 70'
MF	19	(United States) Justin Moose		(substituted on) 75'
Manager
(Iceland) Teitur Thordarson

GK	1	(United States) Matt Jordan
DF	2	(Morocco) Hicham Aâboubou	(yellow card) 52'
DF	3	(Canada) Adam Braz	(yellow card) 21' (yellow-red card) 80'
DF	5	(Canada) Nevio Pizzolitto (c)
DF	23	(Jamaica) Stephen DeRoux
MF	7	(United States) David Testo
MF	8	(Portugal) Filipe Pastel		(substituted off) 78'
MF	11	(Argentina) Leonardo Di Lorenzo
MF	14	(United States) Tony Donatelli
FW	9	(Canada) Rocco Placentino		(substituted off) 69'
FW	28	(Antigua and Barbuda) Peter Byers		(substituted off) 85'
Substitutes
FW	19	(Canada) Reda Agourram	(red card) 90+6'	(substituted on) 69'
MF	21	(France) Philippe Billy		(substituted on) 78'
FW	15	(Canada) Patrick Leduc		(substituted on) 85'
Manager
(Canada) Marc Dos Santos

Man of the Match
(United States) Greg Janicki / (Argentina) Leonardo Di Lorenzo
Assistant referees
Cameron Blair
Kevin Duliba
Fourth official
Alain Ruch

May 12
8:00 pm EDT

Montreal Impact	0–1	Toronto FC
	Report	De Rosario 73'

Saputo Stadium, Montreal, Quebec
Attendance: 10,737
Referee: David Gantar

Montreal Impact	Toronto FC

GK	1	(United States) Matt Jordan
DF	2	(Morocco) Hicham Aaboubou
DF	5	(Canada) Nevio Pizzolitto (c)
DF	23	(Jamaica) Stephen DeRoux
DF	21	(France) Philippe Billy
MF	7	(United States) David Testo
MF	8	(Portugal) Filipe Pastel	(substituted off) 69'
MF	11	(Argentina) Leonardo Di Lorenzo
MF	14	(United States) Tony Donatelli	(substituted off) 85'
FW	9	(Canada) Rocco Placentino	(substituted off) 70'
FW	28	(Antigua and Barbuda) Peter Byers
Substitutes
DF	24	(Canada) Simon Gatti	(substituted on) 69'
FW	12	(Cuba) Eduardo Sebrango	(substituted on) 70'
DF	26	(France) Cédric Joqueviel	(substituted on) 85'
Manager
(Canada) Marc Dos Santos

GK	24	(Switzerland) Stefan Frei
DF	3	(Canada) Nana Attakora
DF	4	(United States) Nick Garcia
DF	12	(Canada) Adrian Cann
DF	33	(Russia) Maxim Usanov	(yellow card) 14'	(substituted off) 46'
MF	2	(United States) Sam Cronin
MF	6	(Canada) Julian de Guzman
MF	25	(Argentina) Martin Šarić
MF	27	(Canada) Gabe Gala
FW	14	(Canada) Dwayne De Rosario (c)		(substituted off) 79'
FW	17	(Jamaica) O'Brian White		(substituted off) 52'
Substitutes
FW	19	(United States) Chad Barrett		(substituted on) 46'
MF	21	(United States) Nick LaBrocca		(substituted on) 52'
MF	22	(The Gambia) Amadou Sanyang		(substituted on) 79'
Manager
(United States) Preki

Man of the Match
(United States) Tony Donatelli / (Canada) Dwayne De Rosario
Assistant referees
Daniel Belleau
Pierre Cantave
Fourth official
Mathieu Bourdeau

May 19
7:30 pm PDT

Vancouver Whitecaps	0–0	Toronto FC
	Report

Swangard Stadium, Burnaby, British Columbia
Attendance: 4,928
Referee: Stephen Depiero

Vancouver Whitecaps	Toronto FC

GK	1	(United States) Jay Nolly
DF	2	(United States) Nelson Akwari
DF	8	(United States) Wes Knight	(yellow card) 90'
DF	14	(United States) Greg Janicki
DF	77	(Georgia (country)) Zourab Tsiskaridze
MF	3	(Canada) Luca Bellisomo
MF	16	(Liberia) Ansu Toure		(substituted off) 64'
MF	19	(United States) Justin Moose		(substituted off) 78'
MF	99	(Mexico) Ricardo Sánchez		(substituted off) 66'
FW	24	(Canada) Marcus Haber	(yellow card) 21'
FW	39	(Saint Vincent and the Grenadines) Cornelius Stewart
Substitutes
MF	22	(Japan) Takashi Hirano		(substituted on) 64'
MF	7	(Canada) Martin Nash (c)		(substituted on) 66'
FW	17	(Canada) Randy Edwini-Bonsu		(substituted on) 78'
Manager
(Iceland) Teitur Thordarson

GK	1	(United States) Jon Conway
DF	3	(Canada) Nana Attakora		(substituted off) 46'
DF	12	(Canada) Adrian Cann
DF	33	(Russia) Maxim Usanov
DF	34	(Latvia) Raivis Hščanovičs	(yellow card) 70'
MF	8	(United States) Dan Gargan
MF	21	(United States) Nick LaBrocca
MF	22	(The Gambia) Amadou Sanyang
MF	27	(Canada) Gabe Gala		(substituted off) 62'
FW	14	(Canada) Dwayne De Rosario (c)	(yellow card) 21'
FW	17	(Jamaica) O'Brian White		(substituted off) 53'
Substitutes
DF	4	(United States) Nick Garcia		(substituted on) 46'
FW	19	(United States) Chad Barrett		(substituted on) 53'
MF	25	(Argentina) Martin Šarić		(substituted on) 62'
Manager
(United States) Preki

Man of the Match
(Canada) Marcus Haber / (Canada) Dwayne De Rosario
Assistant referees
Philippe Brière
Kevin Duliba
Fourth official
Alain Ruch

May 26
8:00 pm EDT

Montreal Impact	1–1	Vancouver Whitecaps
Billy 62'	Report	Toure 50'

Saputo Stadium, Montreal, Quebec
Attendance: 10,959
Referee: Silviu Petrescu

Montreal Impact	Vancouver Whitecaps

GK	22	(Canada) Srdjan Djekanović	(yellow card) 73'
DF	2	(Morocco) Hicham Aaboubou
DF	3	(Canada) Adam Braz (c)
DF	16	(Italy) Stefano Pesoli	(yellow card) 68'
DF	21	(France) Philippe Billy	(yellow card) 89'
MF	6	(Canada) Tyler Hemming		(substituted off) 57'
MF	8	(Portugal) Filipe Pastel		(substituted off) 46'
MF	11	(Argentina) Leonardo Di Lorenzo
MF	14	(United States) Tony Donatelli		(substituted off) 75'
FW	9	(Canada) Rocco Placentino
FW	12	(Cuba) Eduardo Sebrango
Substitutes
DF	23	(Jamaica) Stephen DeRoux		(substituted on) 46'
FW	28	(Antigua and Barbuda) Peter Byers		(substituted on) 57'
DF	15	(Canada) Patrick Leduc		(substituted on) 75'
Manager
(Canada) Marc Dos Santos

GK	1	(United States) Jay Nolly
DF	2	(United States) Nelson Akwari
DF	8	(United States) Wes Knight	(substituted off) 76'
DF	14	(United States) Greg Janicki
DF	77	(Georgia (country)) Zourab Tsiskaridze
MF	3	(Canada) Luca Bellisomo
MF	7	(Canada) Martin Nash (c)
MF	16	(Liberia) Ansu Toure	(substituted off) 68'
MF	19	(United States) Justin Moose	(substituted off) 64'
FW	24	(Canada) Marcus Haber
FW	39	(Saint Vincent and the Grenadines) Cornelius Stewart
Substitutes
FW	18	(Mauritania) Doudou Touré	(substituted on) 64'
MF	22	(Japan) Takashi Hirano	(substituted on) 68'
MF	99	(Mexico) Ricardo Sánchez	(substituted on) 76'
Manager
(Iceland) Teitur Thordarson

Man of the Match
(Canada) Rocco Placentino / (Liberia) Ansu Toure
Assistant referees
Daniel Belleau
Philippe Brière
Fourth official
Mike Edmunds

June 2
8:00 pm EDT

Toronto FC	0–0	Vancouver Whitecaps
	Report

BMO Field, Toronto, Ontario
Attendance: 15,176
Referee: Geoff Gamble

Toronto FC	Vancouver Whitecaps

GK	30	(Serbia) Miloš Kočić
DF	15	(Cameroon) Joseph Nane		(substituted off) 6'
DF	20	(United States) Ty Harden
DF	26	(Canada) Doneil Henry	(yellow card) 37'
DF	34	(Latvia) Raivis Hščanovičs	(yellow card) 85'
MF	2	(United States) Sam Cronin	(yellow card) 45'
MF	6	(Canada) Julian de Guzman		(substituted off) 46'
MF	25	(Argentina) Martin Šarić
MF	27	(Canada) Gabe Gala
FW	7	(United States) Abdus Ibrahim
FW	35	(Canada) Allando Matheson		(substituted off) 66'
Substitutes
DF	33	(Russia) Maxim Usanov		(substituted on) 6'
MF	29	(Canada) Nicholas Lindsay		(substituted on) 46'
MF	14	(Canada) Dwayne De Rosario (c)		(substituted on) 66'
Manager
(Uruguay) Leo Percovich

GK	1	(United States) Jay Nolly
DF	2	(United States) Nelson Akwari
DF	3	(Canada) Luca Bellisomo	(yellow card) 34'
DF	8	(United States) Wes Knight
DF	77	(Georgia (country)) Zourab Tsiskaridze
MF	12	(Northern Ireland) Jonny Steele
MF	15	(Canada) Philippe Davies
MF	29	(Tanzania) Nizar Khalfan		(substituted off) 78'
MF	99	(Mexico) Ricardo Sánchez		(substituted off) 70'
FW	24	(Canada) Marcus Haber	(red card) 31'
FW	39	(Saint Vincent and the Grenadines) Cornelius Stewart		(substituted off) 81'
Substitutes
MF	7	(Canada) Martin Nash (c)		(substituted on) 70'
MF	19	(United States) Justin Moose		(substituted on) 78'
FW	17	(Canada) Randy Edwini-Bonsu		(substituted on) 81'
Manager
(Iceland) Teitur Thordarson

Man of the Match
(Serbia) Martin Šarić / (Georgia (country)) Zourab Tsiskaridze
Assistant referees
Cameron Blair
Pierre Cantave
Fourth official
Silviu Petrescu

== Goalscorers ==
Rank	Player	Team	Goals
1	(United States) Chad Barrett	Toronto FC	1
1	(France) Philippe Billy	Montreal Impact	1
1	(Antigua and Barbuda) Peter Byers	Montreal Impact	1
1	(Canada) Dwayne De Rosario	Toronto FC	1
1	(Canada) Marcus Haber	Vancouver Whitecaps	1
1	(United States) Ty Harden	Toronto FC	1
1	(Liberia) Ansu Toure	Vancouver Whitecaps	1
