= Adrian Cann =

Canadian soccer player (born 1980)

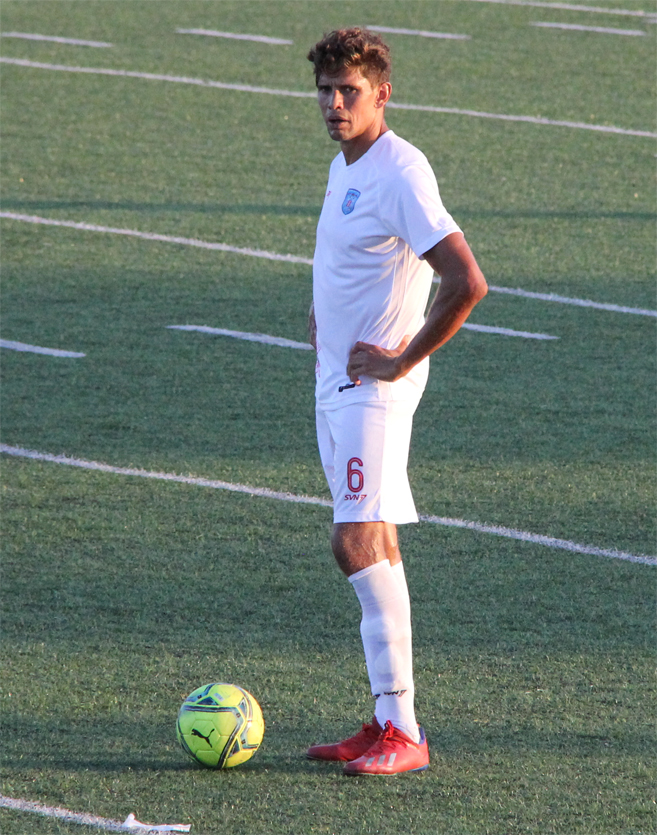
- Cann in 2022

Personal information
- Full name: Adrian Cann
- Date of birth: September 19, 1980 (age 46)
- Place of birth: Thornhill, Ontario, Canada
- Height: 6 ft 3 in (1.91 m)
- Position: Defender

Team information
- Current team: Serbian White Eagles

College career
Years	Team	Apps	(Gls)
2000–2003	Louisville Cardinals		

Senior career*
Years	Team	Apps	(Gls)
2002	York Region Shooters		
2004	Colorado Rapids	2	(0)
2004–2005	Montreal Impact	22	(0)
2006–2008	Vancouver Whitecaps	58	(1)
2008–2010	Esbjerg	14	(0)
2010–2012	Toronto FC	48	(0)
2014–2015	San Antonio Scorpions	38	(2)
2016–2018	Scarborough SC	8	(1)
2018–2019	Mississauga MetroStars (indoor)	13	(0)
2021–	Serbian White Eagles		

International career^{‡}
2002–2003	Canada U20	3	(0)
2008–2011	Canada	9	(0)
2017	Canada Beach	6	(0)
- * Club domestic league appearances and goals as of November 23, 2019 ‡ National team caps and goals as of October 17, 2017

Adrian Cann (born September 19, 1980) is a Canadian soccer player who plays as a defender for Canadian Soccer League club Serbian White Eagles FC.

== Club career ==
=== College ===
Cann had a college soccer career at the University of Louisville from 2000 to 2003. Cann immediately earned a place in the Cardinals' starting lineup as a freshman, starting 20 games for the team, and was named to the first-team All-Conference USA. Cann would maintain this level of performance, being named first-team All-C USA as a sophomore, junior, and senior, and being named the conference's Co-Defensive Player of the Year as a junior and senior. In his final year, he played 15 games for them.

Cann is a member of the University of Louisville Athletics Hall of Fame.

=== Early career ===
In 2002, he played with the York Region Shooters in the Canadian Professional Soccer League during the college offseason. He would make his debut on May 23, 2002, against the Mississauga Olympians.

Upon graduating, Cann was selected 16th overall in the 2004 MLS SuperDraft by Colorado Rapids. Cann played little for the team, however, and was released midseason because of roster restrictions limiting a team's international players. Cann then signed late in the season with Montreal Impact, but saw little playing time for the team, playing only 256 minutes over 7 games. He stayed with the Impact for the 2005 season and made 15 more appearances for them. Throughout his tenure with Montreal, he helped the club win the league championship in 2004 and the regular-season title in 2005.

In 2006, Cann signed with league rivals Vancouver Whitecaps. In his debut season, he assisted the club in winning its first USL First Division Championship by beating the Rochester Raging Rhinos 3–0. Vancouver would re-sign Cann the following season. After the conclusion of the season, he was named the club's Most Outstanding Defender. He would return to Vancouver for his third and final season in 2008. In his final tenure with Vancouver, he was appointed the team captain. Midway through the season, he was transferred to Esbjerg fB in Denmark's premier league.

=== Europe ===
On June 29, 2008, he signed a four-year deal with Danish football side Esbjerg fB. He was released from his contract in early 2010.

Cann underwent a trial with League Two Burton Albion in England before agreeing to a trial with Toronto FC of Major League Soccer in March 2010.

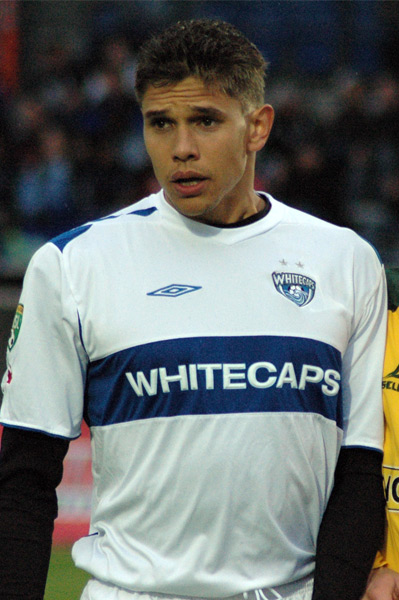
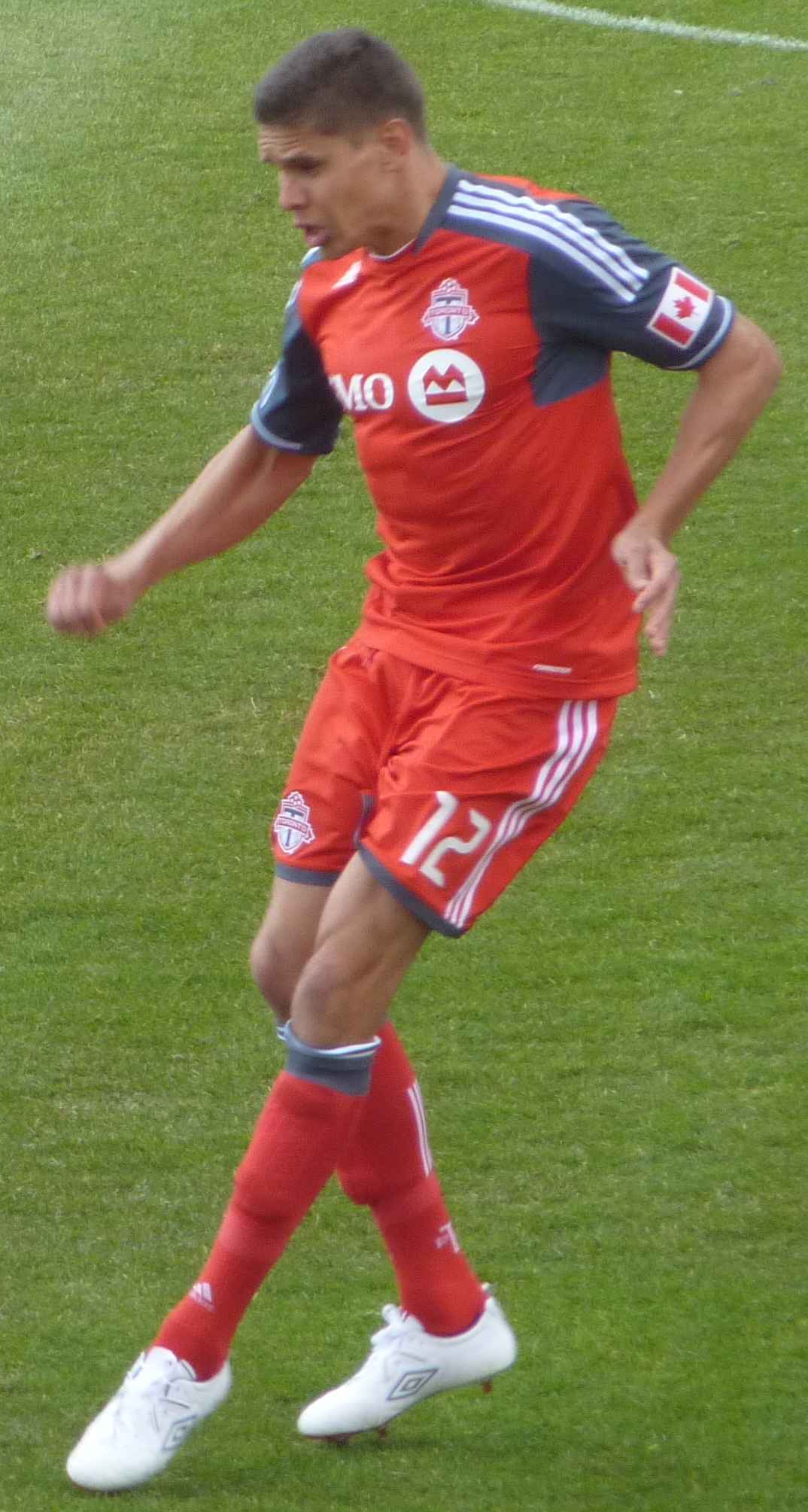
Cann with the Vancouver Whitecaps in 2008 (left) and with Toronto FC in 2011 (right)

=== MLS ===
Cann signed with Toronto FC on April 12, 2010, after ongoing trials with the team. He made his debut for the club against Philadelphia Union on April 15, 2010. Since joining fellow international Nana Attakora in the centre of defence, the Canadian partnership has become one of the strongest in the league. On September 21, 2010, Cann had a stand-out performance, which saw him win Man of the Match against a highly rated Mexican side, Cruz Azul, in the 2010 CONCACAF Champions League Group Stage, the game finished as a 0–0 away draw. This game was also the first time in which Adrian had the honour of wearing the captain's armband for Toronto since Dwayne De Rosario was on the bench. On November 18, Adrian was awarded the team's most valuable player of the 2010 season, taking the honour from captain Dwayne De Rosario who won the award in the 2009 season.

Following pre-season camp in Turkey and Orlando, it was announced by the club on March 2, 2011, that Cann had not traveled with the team to Charleston, South Carolina for the Carolina Challenge Cup. Following Cann's rejection of a new contract offer in which he wanted to continue to negotiate, all deals were removed from the table, leading Cann to retire or wait for Toronto to cancel the remaining years on his current contract. However, eight days later, the club announced that Cann had rejoined the team in Charleston just over a week before the first regular-season game. After a strong early 2011 season from Cann, on May 31, he tore his ACL during a practice on a turf field with the team. Coach Aron Winter confirmed that he would miss the remainder of the 2011 league season.

Cann made his return from injury on April 14, 2012, against Chivas USA the game ended in a 1–0 home loss for Toronto.

Cann was released by Toronto on November 15, 2012. He subsequently entered the 2012 MLS Re-Entry Draft and became a free agent after going undrafted in both rounds of the draft.

=== NASL ===
On January 22, 2014, it was announced that Cann had signed with North American Soccer League club San Antonio Scorpions. He was named the league's player of the week on November 3, 2014, after he recorded a goal that secured the fall season title for the club. San Antonio would claim the Soccer Bowl 2014 by defeating the Fort Lauderdale Strikers.

Cann was re-signed for the 2015 season and served as the team captain.

=== Canada ===
In the summer of 2016, he returned to the CSL circuit to sign with Scarborough SC. He made his debut on August 8, 2016, against Ukraine United. He recorded his first goal on October 9, 2016, in a 2–1 defeat to the Serbian White Eagles. Cann would help the eastern Toronto side secure a playoff berth by finishing third in the league's first division. In the postseason, the club was eliminated in the opening round by Hamilton City. In the 2017 season, Scarborough qualified for the playoffs once again, where they initially defeated Brantford Galaxy and later Vorkuta to reach the championship final. Scarborough would be defeated in the finals in a penalty shootout by the York Region Shooters Cann was named the team captain for the 2018 season. The eastern Toronto side managed to reach the championship final for the second consecutive year but was defeated by Vorkuta.

After a two-year absence, he returned to CSL for the 2021 season to play with the Serbian White Eagles. He re-signed with Serbia for the 2022 season. Throughout the 2022 campaign, he helped the Serbs in securing the regular-season title, including a playoff berth. In the second round of the postseason, the Serbs were eliminated from the competition after a defeat to FC Continentals. Cann returned for the 2023 season. He would win more silverware with the Serbs in 2024 as they defeated his former team, Scarborough, for the Royal CSL Cup. In 2025, he played in the championship match, where Scarborough defeated the Serbs.

== Indoor career ==
In the winter of 2018–19, he transitioned into the indoor soccer format, signing with the Mississauga MetroStars, an expansion franchise that competed in the American-based Major Arena Soccer League. Cann, along with teammate Dwayne De Rosario, was named the team co-captain. He made his debut for the club on December 1, 2018, against the Baltimore Blast. In their debut season, the club failed to secure a playoff berth by finishing fourth in their division. In total, he appeared in 13 matches. The club would fold the following season.

== International ==
He made his debut for Canada in a January 2008 friendly match against Martinique. Cann was also chosen in the 23-man roster for the 2009 CONCACAF Gold Cup, where Canada won Group A with seven points before being knocked out by Honduras in the quarter-finals. His last cap came in 2011, earning him a total of nine caps, two of which were FIFA World Cup qualification matches.

Cann represented Canada at the 2017 CONCACAF Beach Soccer Championship. In 2022, he represented Canada Beach Soccer in the World Winners Cup, a non-FIFA beach soccer tournament.

== Post-playing career ==
After retiring, he became a real estate agent. In 2020, he became involved with a group looking to found a professional soccer team in Peterborough, Ontario, to play in League1 Ontario. The team became known as Electric City FC, with Cann hoping to serve as the team's head coach after retiring.

== Career statistics ==
As of 22 June 2014

Club performance			League		Cup		League Cup		Continental		Total	
Club	League	Season	Apps	Goals	Apps	Goals	Apps	Goals	Apps	Goals	Apps	Goals
United States			League		U.S. Open Cup		MLS Playoffs		North America		Total	
Colorado Rapids	MLS	2004	2	0	0	0	0	0	—		2	0
Canada			League		—		League playoffs		North America		Total	
Montreal Impact	A-League	2004			—		—		—			
Montreal Impact	USL First Division	2005			—				—			
Vancouver Whitecaps	USL First Division	2006			—				—			
Vancouver Whitecaps	USL First Division	2007			—				—			
Vancouver Whitecaps	USL First Division	2008			—		1	0				
Denmark			League		Danish Cup		—		Europe		Total	
Esbjerg fB	Superliga	2008–09	7	0			—		—			
Esbjerg fB	Superliga	2009–10	5	0			—		—			
Canada			League		Canadian Championship		MLS Playoffs		North America		Total	
Toronto FC	MLS	2010	26	0	3	0	—		6	0	35	0
Toronto FC	MLS	2011	12	0	2	0	—		0	0	14	0
Toronto FC	MLS	2012	3	0	1	0	0	0	0	0	3	0
United States			League		U.S. Open Cup		League Playoffs		North America		Total	
San Antonio Scorpions	NASL	2014	9	0	0	0	0	0	0	0	0	0
Career totals	United States		11	0	0	0	0	0	0	0	2	0
Career totals	Canada								6	0		
Career totals	Denmark		12	0								
Career totals	Career statistics								4	0		

== Honours ==
Montreal Impact

- A-League Championship: 2004
- A-League Eastern Conference Championship: 2004
- USL First Division Commissioner's Cup: 2005

Vancouver Whitecaps

- USL First Division Championship: 2006

Toronto FC

- Canadian Championship: 2010, 2011, 2012

Scarborough SC

- CSL Championship runner-up: 2017

Serbian White Eagles

- Canadian Soccer League Regular Season: 2022
- Canadian Soccer League Royal CSL Cup: 2024
- CSL Championship runner-up: 2025

Individual

- Toronto FC Player of the Year: 2010
- 2002 Conference USA Co-Defensive Player of the Year
- 2002 First Team All-Conference USA
- 2002 Team Most Valuable Player
- 2002 Team Most Valuable Defensive Player
- 2002 NSCAA second team All-Great Lakes
- 2001 Conference USA Co-Defensive Player of the Year
- 2001 First Team All-Conference USA
- 2001 Team Most Valuable Player
- 2001 Team Most Valuable Defensive Player
- 2001 NSCAA second team All-Great Lakes
- 2000 First Team All-Conference USA
- 2000 Conference USA All-Freshman Team
- 2000 NSCAA second team All-Great Lakes
