= Nicholas Lindsay =

Canadian soccer player (born 1992)

- Lindsay in 2012

Personal information
- Full name: Nicholas Anthony Lindsay
- Date of birth: September 3, 1992 (age 34)
- Place of birth: Etobicoke, Ontario, Canada
- Height: 5 ft 9 in (1.75 m)
- Position: Forward

Youth career
- Brampton Blast
- Brampton East
- 2009–2012: Toronto FC

College career
Years	Team	Apps	(Gls)
2013–2014	Sheridan Bruins	6	(11)

Senior career*
Years	Team	Apps	(Gls)
2010–2012	Toronto FC	4	(0)
2013–2014	Burlington SC	31	(14)
2015	Toronto Croatia	18	(3)
2016	York Region Shooters		

International career
2010	Canada U-20	2	(0)
- * Club domestic league appearances and goals

Nicholas Lindsay (born September 3, 1992) is a former Canadian soccer player who played as a forward.

He began his career at the academy level with TFC Academy in the Canadian Soccer League (CSL) in 2009. He successfully transitioned to the professional level in 2010 after securing a contract with Toronto FC in Major League Soccer (MLS). After three years in the MLS, he returned to the regional CSL in 2013, where he won a CSL Championship in 2015.

== Club career ==
=== Youth ===
Lindsay played with the Brampton East Chiefs in the 2004 Robbie Tournament, where the team reached the under-12 finals and was defeated by the Woodbridge Strikers East. Despite Brampton's defeat, he was chosen as the Chiefs' game MVP.

In 2005, he played with the Brampton Blast and reached the finals of the under-13 Ontario Cup. He played in the finals against his former team, the Brampton East Chiefs, and contributed a goal that helped secure the title for the Blast. Lindsay returned to Brampton Blast the following season; he assisted the under-14 team in producing a treble season. Initially, the team won the Ontario Youth Soccer League championship and found additional success in the provincial tournament against the Clarkson Comets. After qualifying for the under-14 national championship, they defeated Select Rive-Sud of Quebec for the title. Lindsay would appear in his third Ontario Cup final, where he scored the winning goal for the under-15 team against Clarkson.

He was also a member of the Ontario provincial team.

=== TFC Academy ===
Lindsay joined the Toronto FC senior academy team in the Southern Ontario-based Canadian Soccer League in 2009. In his debut season with the academy side, he helped the team secure a postseason berth by finishing fourth in the national division. Toronto would be eliminated from the playoffs in the opening round after losing a two-game series against the Serbian White Eagles.

He continued playing with the academy team for the 2010 season. Lindsay would record a hat-trick for the academy team against Chilean Colo-Colo during a friendly match on June 29, 2010, which finished 4–4. While playing with the academy squad, he was called to the senior team and debuted in the 2010 Canadian Championship against the Vancouver Whitecaps on June 2, 2010.

=== Toronto FC ===
Lindsay made his first appearance for Toronto FC as a substitute in the 2010 Canadian Championship against the Vancouver Whitecaps and later in a friendly match against Bolton Wanderers. In the match against Vancouver, Toronto drew the match to claim the championship.

He officially signed with the senior team on September 15, 2010, becoming the second TFC Academy player to sign for the first team. Lindsay made his first-team debut on September 15, 2010, vs. Real Salt Lake as a 2nd-half sub in CONCACAF Champions League play. A week later, on September 22, 2010, he earned his first start versus Mexican side Cruz Azul in a game that finished 0-0 in the Champions League.

He made his MLS debut on October 2, 2010, against Seattle Sounders FC, coming on in the 61st minute at Qwest Field and setting up Chad Barrett for Toronto FC's second goal in a 3–2 loss. Lindsay made his first MLS start on October 16 and collected his second assist in a 2–2 draw with Columbus on October 16. He made his third appearance in the continental tournament on October 19, 2010, against Árabe Unido.

In his fourth MLS game, he collected his third assist against D.C. United. After the conclusion of the 2010 season, he was nominated for the Canadian Soccer Association's under-20 Canada Soccer Player of the Year.

Lindsay missed the entire 2011 season due to a knee injury he received during the winter off-season. The injury was a result of a snowmobiling accident that tore his left ACL. After missing the 2011 season, he returned in 2012 and played in the CSL playoffs against the Montreal Impact Academy in the quarterfinals with the academy team. He made his final appearance for the senior team on October 25, 2012, in a continental tournament match against Santos Laguna.

Lindsay's option was declined following the 2012 season.

=== CSL ===
After his release from Toronto, he returned to the CSL circuit for the 2013 season to join the expansion franchise Burlington SC. He recorded the club's first historic goal in a match against Kingston. Lindsay finished the campaign as the club's top goalscorer with 11 goals. Lindsay returned to Burlington for the 2014 season.

In 2015, he signed with league rivals Toronto Croatia. Throughout his short tenure in Toronto, he helped the club secure a playoff berth by finishing as runners-up in the league's first division. The Croats would defeat Milton SC in the opening round of the postseason. Their opponents in the next round were the York Region Shooters, and they advanced to the championship finals. Ultimately, the Croats secured the championship by defeating SC Waterloo Region.

Lindsay signed with the York Region Shooters the following season as Toronto Croatia departed from the league. In his debut season with the Vaughan-based club, he assisted the club in securing the divisional title. In the preliminary round of the playoffs, the Shooters defeated Milton. Their playoff run lasted until the next round as Hamilton City eliminated them in a penalty shootout.

== College career ==
In 2013, he also began playing at the college level with Sheridan Bruins. Throughout his debut season, he finished as the Ontario Colleges Athletic Association top goal scorer with 11 goals in 6 matches.

== International career ==
Lindsay represented Canada in the Danone Nations Cup in 2004. In 2010, Valerio Gazzola, the head coach for the Canada men's national under-20 soccer team, selected Lindsay to the team roster for a series of friendly matches against the United States. After sustaining an injury in 2011, he missed appearing in the CONCACAF U-20 Championship.

== Honours ==
Toronto FC

- Canadian Championship: 2010, 2011, 2012

Toronto Croatia

- CSL Championship: 2015

York Region Shooters

- Canadian Soccer League First Division: 2016

Individual

- Ontario Colleges Athletic Association Top Goal Scorer: 2013–2014

== Club statistics ==
Club	Nat	Season	League	League		Playoff		Domestic Cup		Continental		Total	
Club	Nat	Season	League	Apps	Goals	Apps	Goals	Apps	Goals	Apps	Goals	Apps	Goals
Toronto FC	(Canada)	2010	MLS	4	0	-		1	0	3	0	8	0
Toronto FC	(Canada)	2011	MLS	-		-		-		-		0	0
Toronto FC	(Canada)	2012	MLS	-		-		-		1	0	1	0
Career total				4	0	0	0	1	0	4	0	9	0
