= Raivis Hščanovičs =

Latvian footballer (born 1987)

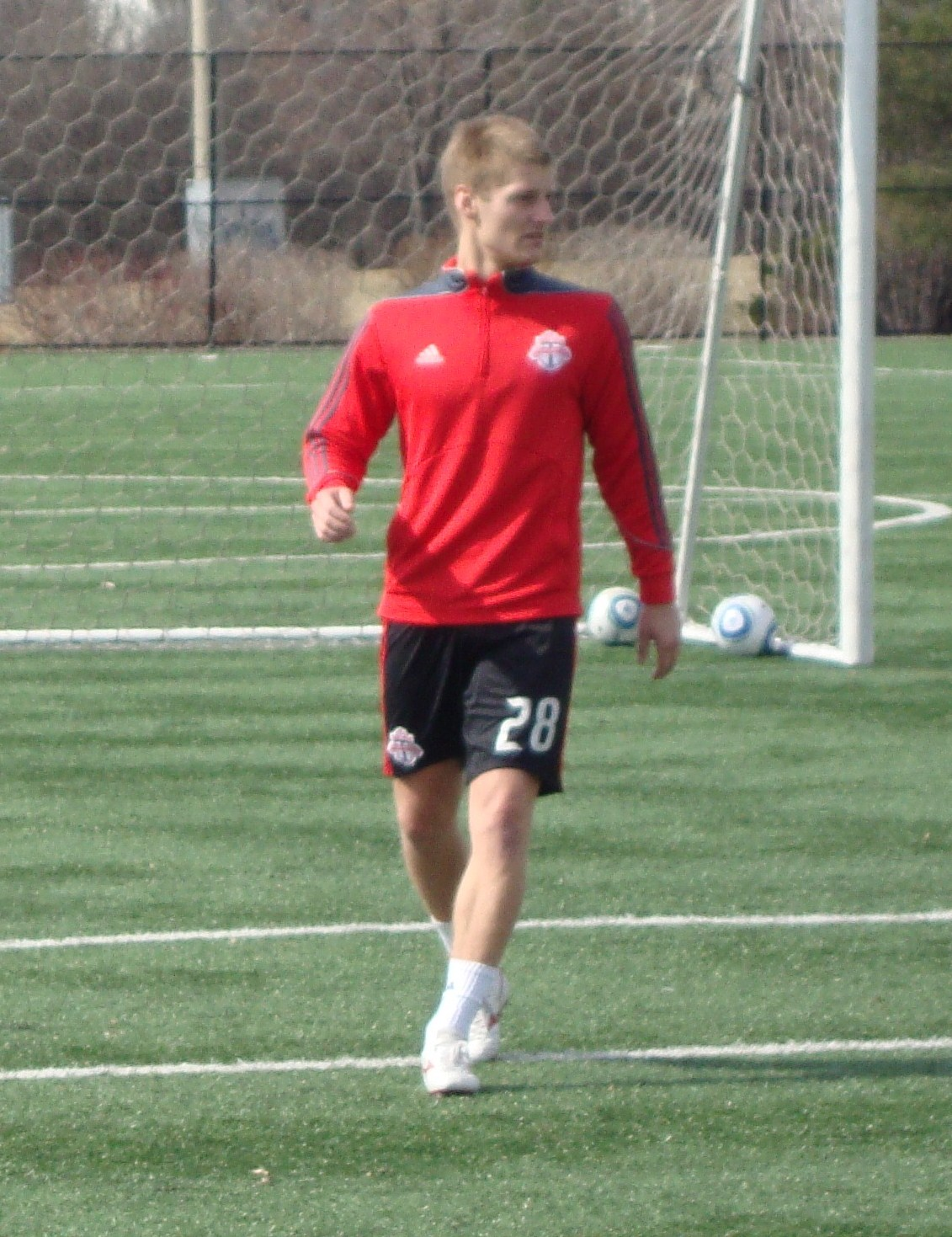
- In training with Toronto FC

Personal information
- Full name: Raivis Hščanovičs
- Date of birth: 15 February 1987 (age 39)
- Place of birth: Riga, Latvian SSR, Soviet Union (now Republic of Latvia)
- Height: 6 ft 0 in (1.83 m)
- Position: Defender

Youth career
- 2002–2006: JFC Skonto

Senior career*
Years	Team	Apps	(Gls)
2007–2009	Skonto Rīga	40	(5)
2010	Toronto FC	14	(0)
2011	FK Jūrmala-VV	17	(1)
2012	FK Ventspils	16	(0)
2013	FK Daugava Rīga	6	(1)
2014	FS METTA/Latvijas Universitāte	5	(0)
2020	FK Jelgava	1	(0)

International career^{‡}
2003	Latvia U-17	3	(1)
2005	Latvia U-19	6	(0)
2008	Latvia U-21	3	(0)
- * Club domestic league appearances and goals as of 1 May 2026 ‡ National team caps and goals as of 1 May 2026

Raivis Hščanovičs (born 15 February 1987 in Riga) is a Latvian former footballer.

== Club career ==
=== Skonto Rīga ===
As a youth player Raivis Hščanovičs was a member of his local club's Skonto Rīga youth system. He was taken to the first team in 2007 at the age of 19. During the first two seasons with the club Hščanovičs appeared in 9 league matches, but his breakout season was in 2009, when the rapidly progressing youngster became a first eleven player and scored 5 goals in 26 league appearances. His performance attracted interest from clubs abroad and in November 2009 he went on trial with the Polish Ekstraklasa club Lechia Gdańsk alongside two other Skonto players, Igors Kozlovs and Oļegs Laizāns, with only the last one signing a contract. Hščanovičs made his European competitions' debut for Skonto on 16 July 2009 in a Europa League second qualifying round match against the Irish side Derry City.

=== Toronto FC ===
In March 2010 Hščanovičs went on trial with the Canadian club Toronto FC and signed a two-year contract with them in the beginning of April, therefore, becoming the first ever Latvian player to play in the Major League Soccer. He made his debut for the club in an away loss to New England Revolution on 10 April 2010. Varying between the first eleven and subs Hščanovičš made 14 MLS appearances for Toronto and helped them win the Canadian Championship for the second year in a row. He also participated in the CONCACAF Champions League, playing three matches. After the end of the season, on 24 November, Hščanovičš was released.

=== Return to Latvia ===
At the beginning of 2011 Hščanovičs returned to his homeland Latvia, in March signing a one-year contract with FK Jūrmala-VV. Throughout the season he appeared in 17 league matches and scored 1 goal, with his club finishing the league in the 8th position. In February 2012 Hščanovičs moved to the Latvian champions FK Ventspils, signing a one-year deal with them. He appeared in 16 league matches and participated in the UEFA Champions League qualification campaign. After the end of the season, in December 2012, Hščanovičs was released alongside two other players. In January 2013 Hščanovičs joined Daugava Rīga. During the season, he battled with a long-term injury and appeared in only 6 league matches, scoring 1 goal. Regardless of Hščanovičs' small playing time, the club managed to reach its highest ever position in the league, finishing the season in the top four. In January 2014 Hščanovičs moved to FS METTA/Latvijas Universitāte, being described by the club's manager Andris Riherts as "a true professional with invaluable experience". At the beginning of the 2014 season he appeared in 5 league matches, later turning to work for his newly founded charity foundation "RH3 fonds". Hščanovičs stated that this does not mean his professional career is over as he still has the desire to play at the top level.

== International career ==
On 7 October 2003 Hščanovičs debuted for the Latvia national under-17 football team in a 1–1 draw against Greece. He was also a member of Latvia U-19 and Latvia U-21 football teams, captaining the latter one in the 2008 Baltic Cup victory. On 12 November 2008 Hščanovičs was firstly called up to the Latvia national football team for a friendly match against Estonia. He remained an unused substitute.

== Personal life and charity work ==
In February 2014 Raivis Hščanovičs launched the RH3 fonds - a charity foundation aimed to help children with oncological diseases. The foundation operates in a form of auctions, where popular sportspeople and organizations from all around the world are invited to donate their equipment with autographs and it is later sold to the highest bidder on the webpage. The financial resources are then transferred to the Children's Clinical University Hospital in Riga. Since the opening of the foundation such famous organizations and individuals as FC Barcelona, Shinji Kagawa, Mista, Anssi Jaakkola, Sandis Ozoliņš, Zemgus Girgensons, Alexander Frolov and many others have taken part with their donations. The name RH3 is composed by the initials of Raivis Hščanovičs and his squad number at FS METTA/Latvijas Universitāte.

At the age of 7 Hščanovičs himself was diagnosed with cancer - a tumor in his left kidney. After a surgery, chemotherapy and radiotherapy he managed to beat the disease and later become a professional footballer.

== Honours ==
=== Toronto FC ===
- Canadian Championship (1): 2010
