= Nana Attakora =

Canadian soccer player and coach

Clement Attakora
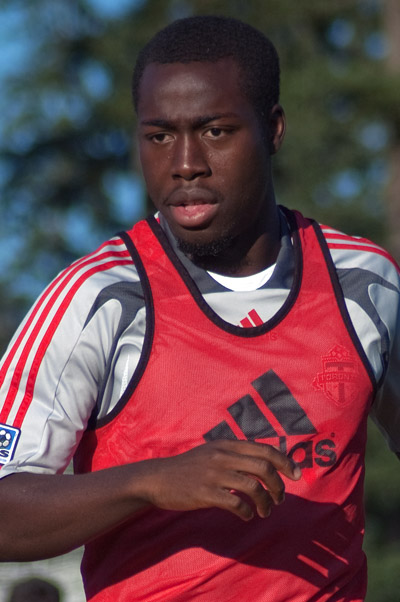

Personal information
- Full name: Nana Attakora-Gyan
- Date of birth: March 27, 1989 (age 37)
- Place of birth: North York, Ontario, Canada
- Height: 6 ft 1 in (1.85 m)
- Position: Defender

Youth career
- 2000–2003: Brampton East
- 2004–2006: NTC Ontario

Senior career*
Years	Team	Apps	(Gls)
2007–2011	Toronto FC	56	(3)
2011	San Jose Earthquakes	6	(0)
2012	Haka	8	(0)
2013	San Jose Earthquakes	8	(0)
2014	D.C. United	0	(0)
2015	San Antonio Scorpions	21	(1)
2016	Fort Lauderdale Strikers	21	(1)
2017	San Francisco Deltas	16	(0)
2018–2019	Ottawa Fury	34	(2)
2020	Oakland Roots	4	(0)
Total		174	(7)

International career^{‡}
2004–2006	Canada U17	7	(1)
2006–2009	Canada U20	20	(1)
2012	Canada U23	4	(0)
2010–2017	Canada	9	(0)

Managerial career
- 2021: Oakland Roots (assistant)
- * Club domestic league appearances and goals as of September 13, 2020 ‡ National team caps and goals as of January 22, 2017

Clement "Nana" Attakora-Gyan (born March 27, 1989), known as Nana Attakora and later Clement Attakora, is a Canadian former soccer player and coach, formerly a player and later assistant coach and director of player personnel of Oakland Roots.

== Career ==
=== Professional ===
Born in North York, Ontario, Attakora trained with Everton of the English Premier League during the summer of 2007, prior to signing for Toronto FC. He played in five MLS Reserve Division games in his debut season, but suffered from a groin injury for the last part of the season, preventing him from making his first team debut until August 9, 2008, when he played against Colorado Rapids. Attakora scored his first career goal vs. Colorado Rapids on September 12, 2009.

Attakora went on to have a very successful campaign with Toronto FC in 2009, working his way into the starting eleven and being voted in by supporters as Toronto FC player of the month for June. With the addition of fellow Canadian International Adrian Cann in the 2010 season the defensive partnership has become one of the strongest in the league. As his contract approached expiry at the end of the 2011 season, it was heavily rumoured that he was looking to move to Europe with his newfound success after he turned down a contract that the Canadian club had offered in November. He later assured the fans that he had no plans on leaving Toronto and that he was waiting for increased stability with the coaching staff.

In July 2011, Attakora was traded to San Jose Earthquakes in a multi-player deal. At season's end, Attakora was out of contract and exploring options abroad, after trials with Hibernian and received a contract offer from 1. FC Union Berlin, Attakora decided he wanted to remain in Major League Soccer.

On August 30, 2012, it was announced that Attakora had signed with Haka of Finland's Veikkausliiga. After Haka was relegated at the end of the season, Attakora returned to Major League Soccer and signed with San Jose Earthquakes on February 22, 2013. Attakora made his first return appearance on March 23 with a stand out 90 minute performance in a 1–0 victory over Seattle Sounders FC.

Attakora was not re-signed by San Jose and entered the 2013 MLS Re-Entry Draft in December 2013. He was selected by D.C. United and signed with the club in January 2014. He failed to make a regular season appearance and was mainly reduced to cup matches and CONCACAF Champions League appearances.

Attakora joined NASL club San Antonio Scorpions on February 25, 2015. He made his debut for San Antonio on April 4 against the Tampa Bay Rowdies.

Attakora joined NASL side Fort Lauderdale Strikers on December 29, 2015.

Attakora made his return to Canada on 10 January 2018, signing with the Ottawa Fury of the United Soccer League. After the 2018 season, the Fury would announce that Attakora would return to the Fury for the 2019 season. After two seasons with the Fury, the club would cease operations for the 2020 season, making Attakora a free agent.

In February 2020, Attakora signed with Oakland Roots SC of the National Independent Soccer Association.

=== International ===
Attakora has represented Canada at U-16, U-17, U-19, U-20 and U-23 levels. In December 2009, Nana won the Canadian U-20 Players of the Year award for the second consecutive year. Nana made his senior national team debut in a friendly match against Jamaica on January 31, 2010. Attakora received his first call-up to the national team in over a year for the final two matches against Saint Kitts and Nevis in the opening group stage of World Cup Qualifying. After failing to play in the first game Attakora came on as a sub for Nikolas Ledgerwood on November 15, 2011 in a 4–0 victory for Canada.

On June 27, 2013 Attakora was listed as a part of the confirmed 23-man squad for Colin Miller's Canada squad for 2013 CONCACAF Gold Cup. The CSA announced July 6 that Kyle Porter would replace Attakora in the Gold Cup due to an ongoing concussion worry that prevented him from even attending the training camp.

Attakora would return to the pitch for Canada in a friendly against Iceland on January 16, 2015. He played the full 90 in a 1–2 loss.

== Coaching career ==
When he retired on November 17, 2020 he immediately stepped up to the post of assistant coach at Oakland Roots.

In December 2025, Attakora was promoted to Director of Soccer.

== Honours ==
=== Toronto FC ===
- Canadian Championship (3): 2009, 2010, 2011

=== San Francisco Deltas ===
- NASL Championship: 2017

=== Individual ===
- Canadian U-20 Players of the Year: 2008, 2009

== Career statistics ==
=== Club ===
As of September 13, 2020

Club	League	Season	League		Playoffs		Cup		Continental		Total	
Club	League	Season	Apps	Goals	Apps	Goals	Apps	Goals	Apps	Goals	Apps	Goals
Toronto FC	MLS	2008	5	0	—		0	0	—		5	0
Toronto FC	MLS	2009	20	2	—		4	0	0	0	24	2
Toronto FC	MLS	2010	25	1	—		2	0	6	1	33	2
Toronto FC	MLS	2011	6	0	—		0	0	—		6	0
Toronto FC	Total		56	3	0	0	6	0	6	1	68	4
San Jose Earthquakes	MLS	2011	6	0	—		0	0	—		6	0
FC Haka	Ykkönen	2012	8	0	—		0	0	—		8	0
San Jose Earthquakes	MLS	2013	6	0	—		0	0	—		6	0
D.C. United	MLS	2014	0	0	0	0	1	0	1	0	2	0
San Antonio Scorpions	NASL	2015	21	1	—		1	0	—		22	1
Fort Lauderdale Strikers	NASL	2016	21	1	—		1	0	—		22	1
San Francisco Deltas	NASL	2017	18	0	0	0	2	0	—		20	0
Ottawa Fury	USL	2018	17	2	—		4	0	—		21	2
Ottawa Fury	USL Championship	2019	17	0	1	0	1	0	—		19	0
Ottawa Fury	Total		34	2	1	0	4	0	0	0	40	2
Oakland Roots	NISA	2019–20	2	0	0	0	0	0	—		2	0
Oakland Roots	NISA	2020–21	2	0	2	0	0	0	—		4	0
Oakland Roots	Total		4	0	2	0	0	0	0	0	6	0
Career total			174	7	3	0	16	0	7	1	200	8

=== International ===
As of January 22, 2017

Canada national team
Year	Apps	Goals
2010	1	0
2011	1	0
2012	1	0
2013	4	0
2015	2	0
2017	1	0
Total	10	0
