= Chad Barrett =

American soccer player (born 1985)

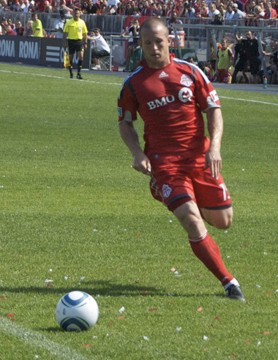
- Barrett playing for Toronto FC in 2010

Personal information
- Full name: Chad Randall Barrett
- Date of birth: April 30, 1985 (age 41)
- Place of birth: San Diego, California, United States
- Height: 5 ft 11 in (1.80 m)
- Position: Forward

College career
Years	Team	Apps	(Gls)
2003–2004	UCLA Bruins	43	(16)

Senior career*
Years	Team	Apps	(Gls)
2005–2008	Chicago Fire	82	(18)
2008–2010	Toronto FC	65	(16)
2011–2012	LA Galaxy	45	(8)
2012	→ Vålerenga (loan)	5	(0)
2013	New England Revolution	19	(2)
2014–2015	Seattle Sounders FC	44	(12)
2016	San Jose Earthquakes	20	(2)
2017	Real Salt Lake	3	(0)
Total		283	(58)

International career^{‡}
2003	United States U18	4	(0)
2004–2005	United States U20	19	(9)
2008	United States U23	3	(0)
2008	United States	1	(0)
- * Club domestic league appearances and goals as of October 25, 2017 ‡ National team caps and goals as of June 29, 2014

Chad Randall Barrett (born April 30, 1985) is an American former professional soccer player who played as a forward.

== Career ==
=== College ===
Born in San Diego, Barrett played two seasons of college soccer at UCLA and led the team in assists his second year. He chose to forgo the rest of his college career, signing a Generation adidas contract with MLS. He attended Southridge HS and played Club Soccer for Westside Metros in Beaverton Oregon.

=== Professional ===
Chicago Fire drafted Barrett with the third overall pick of the 2005 MLS SuperDraft, and he quickly established himself as a starter for the Fire during the 2007 season, scoring seven goals. He scored a key goal in the Fire's win at D.C. United in the first round of the playoffs.

Barrett is known for his workman-like play. In his three seasons with Chicago, he led the team in goals two years, and was second the other. Not known for a great first touch, his industrious play resulted in eighteen league goals in his time in Chicago where the often more heralded Calen Carr failed to impress.

With the Chicago Fire, Barrett won the 2006 Lamar Hunt U.S. Open Cup.

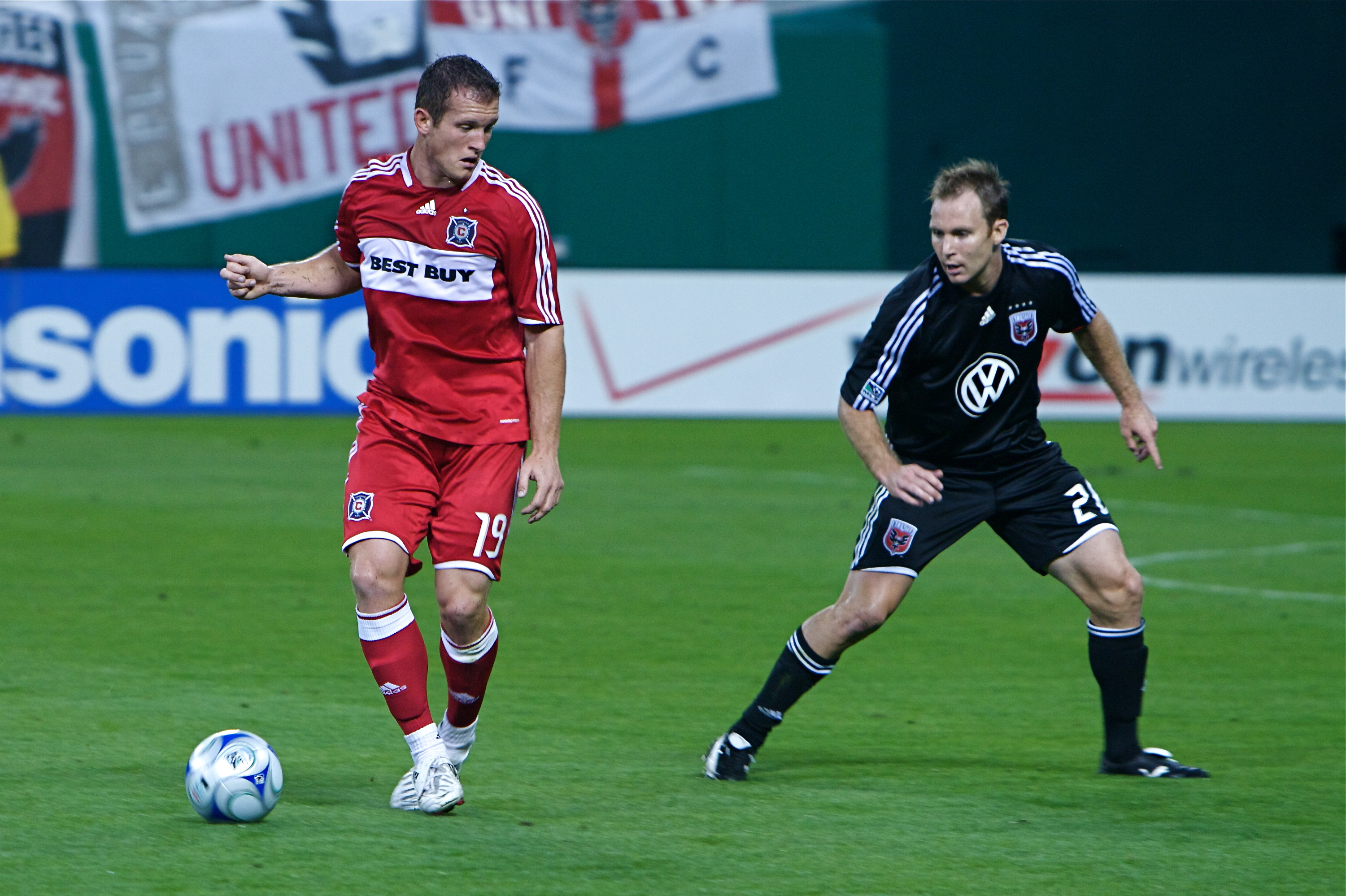
Chad Barrett playing for Chicago

On April 12, 2008, Barrett led Chicago Fire over San Jose Earthquakes 1–0 in front of 20,038 fans at the Earthquakes home opener at McAfee Coliseum. Barrett tallied the game-winning goal in the ninth minute, while Fire goalkeeper Jon Busch recorded eight saves in his second shutout of the season.

He, along with a first-round pick in the 2009 MLS SuperDraft and allocation money, was traded to Toronto FC on July 25, 2008, in exchange for the rights to Brian McBride. Barrett signed a 4-year contract extension with Toronto FC on September 1, 2008.

On April 28, 2010, Barrett scored his first goal of the 2010 season, the second goal in a 2–0 win over Montreal Impact during the opening game of the 2010 Canadian Championship On May 8, 2010, Barrett added his first league goals of the season, scoring a pair in Toronto's 4–1 win over his former team Chicago Fire.

In the 2010–11 CONCACAF Champions League preliminary round tie against C.D. Motagua, Barrett scored two goals (one in each leg), helping Toronto F.C. to a 3–2 aggregate win.

Barrett was traded to LA Galaxy on January 13, 2011, in exchange for future considerations. On October 2, 2011, Barrett scored his 40th career goal in a 2–1 over Real Salt Lake. This goal placed Barrett in the top 50 MLS scorers of all time.

After a brief trial, Barrett was loaned to Norwegian club Vålerenga on July 30, 2012.

Los Angeles declined Barrett's contract option for 2013 and he elected to enter the 2012 MLS Re-Entry Draft. On December 14, 2012, Barrett was selected in stage two of the draft by New England Revolution with the number 4 overall pick. He later officially signed a deal with the club on February 11, 2013.

On December 18, 2013, Barrett was picked up in the second stage of the 2013 MLS Re-Entry Draft by Seattle Sounders FC. On March 8, 2014, in the Sounders season opener against Sporting KC, Barrett scored the game-winning goal in stoppage time with the game ending 1–0.

On December 28, 2015, Barrett signed with San Jose Earthquakes as a free agent.

On January 23, 2017, Barrett signed with Real Salt Lake as a free agent. His option was declined at the end of the 2017 season. He officially announced his retirement as an active player on his Instagram account on September 25, 2018.

=== International ===
Barrett has played for various youth United States national teams. He was a key player on the Under-20 team at the 2005 World Youth Championship and was named to the U-23 men's national team for 2008 Olympic qualifying.

He made his debut for the United States men's national soccer team on June 22, 2008, coming on as a second-half substitute in a World Cup qualifier against Barbados.

=== Media ===
Whilst recovering from injury Barrett and teammate David Horst would do live radio shows entitled 'the horse, the bear and the lion' which would be streamed on the RSL Facebook page.

He previews and commentates on MLS matches for ESPN700 Sports in Salt Lake.

== Honors ==
Chicago Fire

- U.S. Open Cup (1): 2006

Toronto FC

- Canadian Championship (2): 2009, 2010

LA Galaxy

- MLS Cup (1): 2011
- Supporters' Shield (1): 2011
- Western Conference (Playoffs) (1): 2011

Seattle Sounders FC

- Supporters' Shield (1): 2014
- U.S. Open Cup (1): 2014
