= O'Brian White =

Jamaican footballer (born 1985)

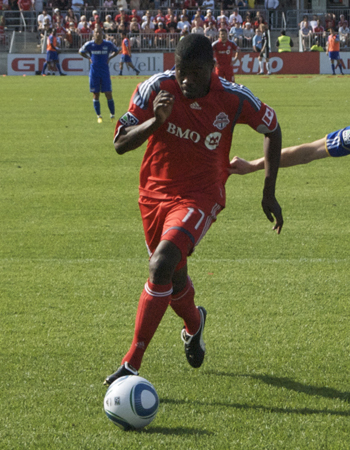

Personal information
- Full name: O'Brian White
- Date of birth: 14 December 1985 (age 40)
- Place of birth: Ocho Rios, Jamaica
- Height: 6 ft 1 in (1.85 m)
- Position: Forward

College career
Years	Team	Apps	(Gls)
2005–2008	Connecticut Huskies	77	(46)

Senior career*
Years	Team	Apps	(Gls)
2009–2010	Toronto FC	33	(4)
2011–2012	Seattle Sounders FC	7	(2)
Total		40	(6)

International career^{‡}
1999	Jamaica U15	12	(10)
2001	Jamaica U17	4	(3)
2005	Jamaica U20	5	(2)
2010	Jamaica	1	(0)
- * Club domestic league appearances and goals as of 22 April 2011 ‡ National team caps and goals as of 18 November 2010

O'Brian White (born 14 December 1985) is a Jamaican former footballer who played as a forward. White played for Toronto FC and Seattle Sounders FC of Major League Soccer (MLS) and appeared internationally for the Jamaica national football team.

== Career ==
=== Youth and college ===
White grew up in Jamaica before moving to Scarborough, Ontario in 2002 to live with his mother. He began playing football while attending Lester B. Pearson Collegiate Institute, where he was named the Most Valuable Player of the squad in 2004 and 2005.

White played college soccer at the University of Connecticut. He won the Hermann Trophy, the highest individual honor in NCAA Division I soccer and the Soccer America Player of the Year Award in 2007.

=== Professional ===
After signing a deal with Major League Soccer, he was selected fourth overall by Toronto FC in the 2009 MLS SuperDraft on 15 January 2009. White made his debut for Toronto FC in an international friendly against the Argentinean side River Plate, at BMO Field on 22 July 2009, and made his MLS debut on 25 July 2009, against the Columbus Crew. He scored his first MLS goal on 15 August 2009, against D.C. United. White won his first individual award with Toronto FC after being named MLS Goal of the Week in week 26 for his goal in the 3–2 victory against Colorado Rapids on 12 September 2009. On 25 April 2010, White scored his first goal on the 2010 Season in a 2–0 win against the Seattle Sounders FC.

White was taken by the Vancouver Whitecaps FC in the 2010 MLS Expansion Draft, but was traded to Seattle Sounders FC three hours afterwards.

After undergoing blood clot surgery, White was bought out of his contract by Seattle so that he'd no longer be part of the club's roster. However, he would stay with the club while they supported him during his recovery.

=== International ===
White has played for Jamaica's under-15, under-17 and under-20 national teams but through FIFA rules he remains eligible to represent either Jamaica or Canada at the senior level. However, in November 2010 White accepted an invitation from the Jamaican Senior Team to play against Costa Rica on the 17th. White did make his debut for Jamaica in the Costa Rica match that ended in a 0–0 draw.

== Post-football ==
In 2014, in an article and interview with the Jamaican Gleaner newspaper, White discussed the uncertainty regarding his potential return to football, citing the necessity of the use of blood-thinning medication which prevented him from playing even recreationally. He announced his intention to run football clinics, and sanguinely accepted the short-lived nature of a professional footballing career with a positive view of the future.
