= Amadou Sanyang =

Gambian footballer (born 1991)

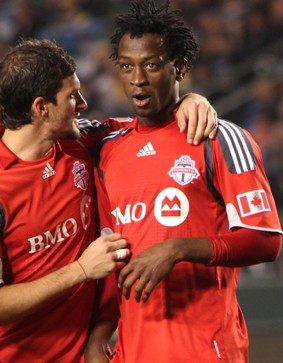

Personal information
- Full name: Amadou Sanyang
- Date of birth: 1 August 1991 (age 35)
- Place of birth: Bakau, Gambia
- Height: 6 ft 0 in (1.83 m)
- Positions: Defensive midfielder; defender

Youth career
- 2005–2007: Real de Banjul
- 2009: TFC Academy

Senior career*
Years	Team	Apps	(Gls)
2007–2009	Real de Banjul		
2009–2010	Toronto FC	20	(0)
2011	Seattle Sounders FC	1	(0)
2012–2014	Charleston Battery	59	(5)
2015–2016	Seattle Sounders FC 2	21	(0)
Total		101+	(5+)

International career
2007	Gambia U17		
2008	Gambia U20		

Managerial career
- 2022–: Ballard FC (assistant)
- * Club domestic league appearances and goals as of 07:20, 20 June 2016 (UTC)

Amadou Sanyang (born 1 August 1991) is a Gambian footballer who plays as a defender or midfielder.

== Club career ==
=== Professional ===
Sanyang began his professional career with Real de Banjul of the Gambian Championnat National D1. Sanyang's time with Real de Banjul was a successful one, and in 2007 he was honoured as the best midfielder in the Gambian League.

His play with the Gambian Under-20 National Team sparked interest among Major League Soccer clubs and in early 2009 he was signed by Toronto FC along with a fellow countrymen Emmanuel Gomez. Due to his age he was initially ineligible to join the senior squad until his 18th birthday, which took place on 1 August 2009; during this time he trained with both the senior team and the TFC Academy. He played with the Toronto FC Academy in the Canadian Soccer League during this time.

Sanyang made his debut for Toronto FC on 1 August 2009 as a sub vs. New England Revolution.

In September 2009, two Ligue 1 clubs sent scouts to Toronto to watch him in action. Dutch club PSV Eindhoven also requested video footage.

Sanyang made 14 appearances in his second year with Toronto and first full season, he was plagued with a concussion that prevented him making any appearances in the second half of the season.

On 30 July 2011, Sanyang signed with Seattle Sounders FC.

After his release by Seattle, Sanyang signed with USL Pro club Charleston Battery on 6 April 2012.

== International career ==
Sanyang has represented his nation at various youth levels. He was a member of the Gambian U-17 National Team, and is currently part of the U-20 squad. In 2007, he helped lead the Gambian U-17 squad in conquering the Four Nation Tournament held in Côte d'Ivoire. He was named the second best player in the tournament.

== Managerial career ==
Sanyang joined the coaching staff of Ballard FC in the USL League Two as an assistant coach in 2022. He re-sign with the club the following season.

== Honours ==
Toronto

- Canadian Championship: 2010
