= Martin Šarić =

Argentine footballer

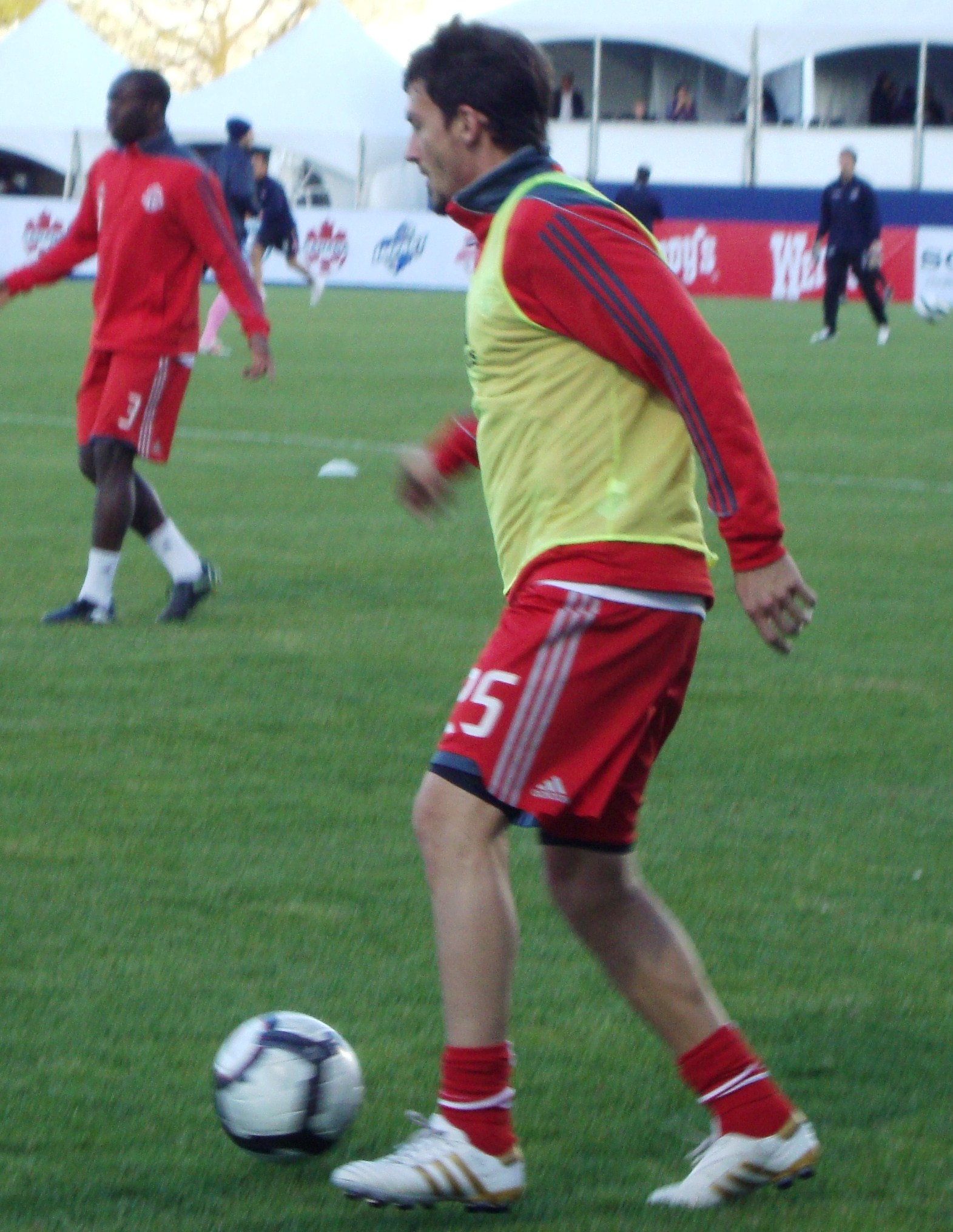
- Šarić in 2010

Personal information
- Date of birth: 18 August 1979 (age 47)
- Place of birth: Buenos Aires, Argentina
- Height: 1.82 m (6 ft 0 in)
- Position: Midfielder

Youth career
- 1991–1999: San Lorenzo

Senior career*
Years	Team	Apps	(Gls)
2000–2001	Sportivo Luqueño		
2001	Nueva Chicago	0	(0)
2002	NK Zagreb	1	(0)
2002–2004	NK Rijeka	24	(1)
2004–2005	NK Ljubljana	11	(0)
2005	Hapoel Beer Sheva	16	(0)
2006–2007	Politehnica Iaşi	28	(2)
2007	Oțelul Galați	0	(0)
2007–2008	Hapoel Ramat Gan	28	(0)
2008–2009	NK Celje	25	(0)
2010	Toronto FC	17	(0)
2011	Sportivo Luqueño	2	(0)
- * Club domestic league appearances and goals as of 25 March 2018

Martin Šarić (born 18 August 1979 in Buenos Aires) is an Argentine retired footballer who played as a midfielder.

== Career ==
Šarić began his career in his native Argentina in the youth system of San Lorenzo. He went on to play for the club's reserve side before being released in 1999. He went on to play for Sportivo Luqueño in Paraguay and Nueva Chicago, whom he helped return to the top flight in 2001, before moving to further his career in Europe in 2002.

He played in the UEFA Intertoto Cup with Croatian club NK Rijeka in 2002, played with FC Ljubljana in the Slovenian PrvaLiga in 2003, and played with Politehnica Iași in Romania in 2006/2007, as well as a short spell in Israel.

Šarić played 25 matches for NK Celje in the 2008/09 season before leaving the club shortly after the beginning of the 2009/10 season. He signed with Toronto FC on 26 March 2010 after a successful trial. He made his debut for Toronto FC on 27 March 2010 in a 2–0 loss to Columbus Crew. Saric scored his first goal for Toronto in a 2–1 home victory over Cruz Azul in the CONCACAF Champions League 17 August 2010. After making 23 appearances and scoring 1 goal in all competitions in the 2010 season with Toronto he was released by the club on 24 November.

His older brother was San Lorenzo's former player, Mirko Šarić, one of big hopes of Argentine football, who committed suicide in 2000.

== Honours ==
Croatian national football league (Prva HNL) with NK Zagreb in 2002.

=== Toronto FC ===
- Canadian Championship (1): 2010
