= Maxim Usanov =

Russian footballer

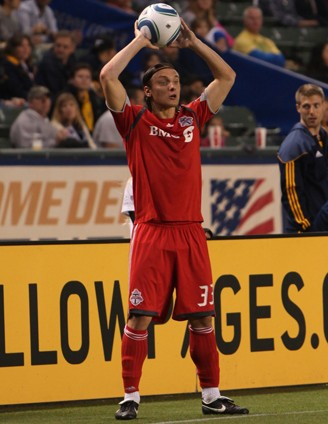

Personal information
- Full name: Maxim Aleksandrovich Usanov
- Date of birth: 5 March 1985 (age 41)
- Place of birth: Leningrad, Soviet Union
- Height: 5 ft 9 in (1.75 m)
- Position: Defender

Senior career*
Years	Team	Apps	(Gls)
2003–2004	Zenit St. Petersburg	0	(0)
2005	Skonto Riga	8	(0)
2005	FK Riga	12	(0)
2006–2007	Skonto Riga	10	(0)
2007	→ Spartak Nalchik (loan)	2	(0)
2008	→ Alania Vladikavkaz (loan)	19	(0)
2009	Skonto Riga	0	(0)
2009–2010	FC Krasnodar	3	(0)
2010	Toronto FC	14	(0)
2012–2013	FC Petrotrest Saint Petersburg	11	(0)
2013	FC Rus Saint Petersburg	13	(0)
2014–2015	Banants Yerevan	0	(0)
2015	Skonto Riga	4	(0)
- * Club domestic league appearances and goals

Maxim Aleksandrovich Usanov (Russian: Максим Александрович Усанов; born 5 March 1985) is a Russian former footballer.

== Career ==
Usanov began his career for FC Zenit Saint Petersburg, playing one game in the Russian Premier League Cup. He played with Latvian clubs FK Riga and Skonto FC, signing with the team on three occasions. Usanov has also played for PFC Spartak Nalchik in the Russian Premier League and FC Alania Vladikavkaz in the Russian First Division. He last played with Russian club FC Krasnodar before signing with Toronto FC on April 12, 2010. He made his debut for Toronto FC against the Philadelphia Union on April 15, 2010. After making 21 appearances in all competitions in the 2010 season with Toronto, he was released by the club on November 24, 2010.

== Honours ==
=== Toronto FC ===
- Canadian Championship (1): 2010
