= Jacob Peterson (soccer) =

American soccer player

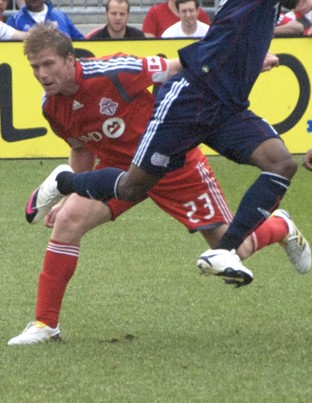

Personal information
- Full name: Jacob Peterson
- Date of birth: January 27, 1986 (age 40)
- Place of birth: Portage, Michigan, US
- Height: 5 ft 10 in (1.78 m)
- Positions: Winger; forward

Youth career
- 2002–2003: IMG Soccer Academy

College career
Years	Team	Apps	(Gls)
2003–2005	Indiana Hoosiers		

Senior career*
Years	Team	Apps	(Gls)
2004	Michigan Bucks	10	(1)
2005	Kalamazoo Kingdom	3	(0)
2006–2009	Colorado Rapids	92	(8)
2010–2011	Toronto FC	37	(1)
2011	San Jose Earthquakes	9	(0)
2012–2016	Sporting Kansas City	108	(13)
2017	Atlanta United	10	(3)

International career^{‡}
2002–2003	United States U17	17	(3)
2005	United States U20	21	(12)
- * Club domestic league appearances and goals as of October 26, 2017 ‡ National team caps and goals as of November 22, 2010

Jacob Peterson (born January 27, 1986) is an American former professional soccer player who last played with Atlanta United FC in Major League Soccer.

== Career ==
=== College and amateur ===
Peterson played youth soccer for local powerhouse Michigan Wolves, whom he led to four state championships, two Midwest regional championships, and a third-place finish at the nationals, He played college soccer at Indiana University for three years from 2003 to 2005 where he scored 30 goals in 71 appearances. He also spent two seasons in the USL Premier Development League, playing for Michigan Bucks in 2004 and Kalamazoo Kingdom in 2005.

=== Professional ===
Peterson was drafted in the second round, 21st overall, of the 2006 MLS SuperDraft by Colorado Rapids. He was a major part of the Rapids midfield from 2006 to 2009, amassing over 100 appearances for the club in all competitions.

In January 2010, Peterson was traded to Toronto FC in exchange for allocation money. He made his debut for the club as a sub against Philadelphia Union April 15, 2010. Peterson scored his first goal for Toronto in the CONCACAF Champions League group stage versusReal Salt Lake in a 1–1 home draw on September 28. On October 16, Peterson scored his first league goal for Toronto in a 2–2 home draw with Columbus. After a disappointing first half of 2011, Peterson was traded along with Alan Gordon and Nana Attakora to San Jose Earthquakes for Ryan Johnson, allocation money, and an international roster spot.

Peterson remained with San Jose through the 2011 season. At season's end, the club declined his 2012 contract option, and he entered the 2011 MLS Re-Entry Draft. Peterson was not selected in the draft and became a free agent.

Sporting Kansas City signed Peterson ahead of the 2012 season. He would play five seasons with Sporting KC and was part of the 2013 MLS Cup winners and two Lamar Hunt U.S. Open Cup-winning squads. During his time with Sporting, he became known for his hard work and versatility, garnering the nickname "The Answer" for his ability to fill in at multiple positions.

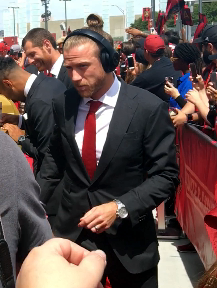
Jacob Peterson after signing the Golden Spike for Atlanta United on September 10, 2017

A free agent after the 2016 season, Peterson signed with expansion Atlanta United for 2017. He scored 3 goals in 10 appearances for the Five Stripes before being waived by the club on January 29, 2018. In 2020 he returned to Sporting Kansas City as part of the club's broadcast team. In March 2022, Peterson joined the Sporting KC technical staff as a scout.

== Honors ==
=== Indiana University ===
- NCAA Men's Division I Soccer Championship (2): 2004

=== Toronto FC ===
- Canadian Championship (2): 2010, 2011

=== Sporting Kansas City ===
- Major League Soccer Eastern Conference Regular Season Championship (1): 2012
- Lamar Hunt U.S. Open Cup: 2012, 2015
- MLS Cup: 2013
