= 2007 Toronto FC season =

Toronto FC 2007 soccer season

Toronto FC
2007 season
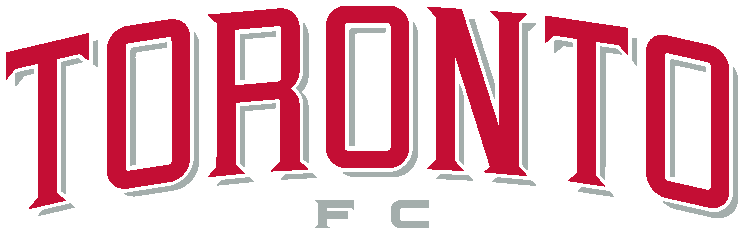
- Head coach: Mo Johnston
- Stadium: BMO Field
- Majoe League Soccer: Conference: 7th Overall: 13th
- MLS Cup playoffs: Did not qualify
- Carolina Challenge Cup: Runners-up
- Top goalscorer: League: Danny Dichio (6); All: Danny Dichio (6)
Home colours	Away colours

Toronto FC began play in Major League Soccer in 2007, and the club's first regular season match was on April 7, 2007, at the Home Depot Center in Los Angeles away to Chivas USA. Toronto FC suffered a 2–0 loss. Toronto's first home match was on April 28, 2007, at BMO Field against Kansas City Wizards. The home side lost 1–0 on an 81st-minute goal by Eddie Johnson.

Danny Dichio scored the first goal ever for Toronto FC on May 12, 2007, in the 24th minute against Chicago Fire in the franchise's first ever win, a 3–1 victory. Despite finishing last in the Eastern Conference and not making the MLS Cup Playoffs, Toronto FC was a success in its inaugural season, selling out every home game at BMO Field and capturing significant media attention in Toronto and in other MLS markets.

Dichio was also the first ever Toronto FC player red-carded, being ejected in the 44th minute of the same game as his historic goal. That strike had ended the second longest opening scoreless streak for a new club in MLS after Real Salt Lake. Toronto won the game 3–1, with additional goals by Maurice Edu and Kevin Goldthwaite. Game play was delayed several minutes as many fans threw seat cushions onto the field in celebration. The cushions had been a free gift to ticket-holders to commemorate the club's official opening weekend. Now, Toronto FC fans sing Dichio's name in the 24th minute of every match. On May 26, 2007, Dichio scored the team's first-ever goal on the road, and he scored the last goal of Toronto's first season, in the 91st minute of the final game against the New England Revolution.

At the 6th minute of Toronto FC's loss to D.C. United on August 26, Toronto FC broke the Major League Soccer record of minutes without a goal at 558 minutes. The record was previously held by Real Salt Lake. On September 22, Toronto FC ended their streak, scoring at the two-minute mark of their match against the Columbus Crew on a goal by Miguel Cañizalez, setting a league record at 824 minutes. Cañizalez's goal was also the first goal by a Canadian during MLS play at BMO Field.

In their inaugural season, Toronto FC's average attendance was 20,130, the third highest in the league behind Los Angeles Galaxy (24,252) and D.C. United (20,967).

== Matches ==
=== 2007 Carolina Challenge Cup ===
March 24, 2007	Toronto FC	0 – 2	Houston Dynamo	Charleston, South Carolina
		(Report)	Cochrane 16'; Wondolowski 73'	Stadium: Blackbaud Stadium; Attendance: 3,183

March 28, 2007	Toronto FC	2 – 1	New York Red Bulls	Charleston, South Carolina
	Eskandarian 9'; Buddle 36'	(Report)	Wolyniec 21'	Stadium: Blackbaud Stadium

March 31, 2007	Charleston Battery	0 – 3	Toronto FC	Charleston, South Carolina
		(Report)	Eskandarian 3'; Ibrahim 35'; Buddle 73'	Stadium: Blackbaud Stadium

=== 2007 Major League Soccer season ===
April 7, 2007	Chivas USA	2–0	Toronto FC	Carson, California
	Ante Razov 35'; Alex Zotinca (yellow card) 84'; Sacha Kljestan 88'	(report)	Miguel Canizalez (yellow card) 61'; Paulo Nagamura (yellow card) 77'	Stadium: The Home Depot Center; Attendance: 14,351; Referee: Terry Vaughn

April 14, 2007	New England Revolution	4–0	Toronto FC	Foxborough, Massachusetts
	Taylor Twellman 12'; Taylor Twellman 18'; Shalrie Joseph 60' (pen.); Andy Dorman 72'; Avery John (yellow card) 79'	(report)	Edson Buddle (yellow card) 13'; Andrew Boyens (yellow card) 45'; Paulo Nagamura (yellow card) 60'; Jim Brennan (yellow card) 72'	Stadium: Gillette Stadium; Attendance: 18,184; Referee: Mark Geiger

April 25, 2007	Kansas City Wizards	3–0	Toronto FC	Kansas City, Missouri
	Eddie Johnson 5'; Eddie Johnson (yellow card) 5'; Jack Jewsbury (yellow card) 49'; Kerry Zavagnin 55'; Carlos Marinelli (yellow card) 66'; Yura Movsisyan 70'	(report)	Alecko Eskandarian (yellow card) 28'; Paulo Nagamura (yellow card) 34'; Andy Welsh (yellow card) 68'	Stadium: Arrowhead Stadium; Attendance: 7,438; Referee: Andrew Chapin

April 28, 2007	Toronto FC	0–1	Kansas City Wizards	Toronto
	Andrew Boyens (yellow card) 3'; Danny Dichio (yellow card) 23'	(report)	Jose Burciaga Jr. (yellow card) 44'; Kerry Zavagnin (yellow card) 70'; Davy Arnaud (yellow card) 73'; Eddie Johnson 81'	Stadium: BMO Field; Attendance: 20,148; Referee: Mauricio Navarro

May 12, 2007	Toronto FC	3–1	Chicago Fire	Toronto
	Danny Dichio 24'; Maurice Edu (yellow card) 30'; Marvell Wynne (yellow card) 38'; Danny Dichio (red card) 44'; Kevin Goldthwaite 51'; Maurice Edu 75'	(report)	Thiago (yellow card) 27'; Chris Rolfe 36'; Diego Gutiérrez (red card) 45'	Stadium: BMO Field; Attendance: 20,041; Referee: Silviu Petrescu

May 16, 2007	Toronto FC	1–0	Houston Dynamo	Toronto
	Andy Welsh 25'; Jim Brennan (yellow card) 43'; Alecko Eskandarian (yellow card) 54'; Chris Pozniak (yellow card) 86'	(report)	Eddie Robinson (yellow card) 76'	Stadium: BMO Field; Attendance: 19,123; Referee: Terry Vaughn

May 19, 2007	Toronto FC	1–2	D.C. United	Toronto
	Alecko Eskandarian (yellow card) 17'; Maurice Edu (yellow card) 30'; Kevin Goldthwaite (yellow card) 36'; Alecko Eskandarian 44'; Jim Brennan (yellow card) 81'	(report)	Facundo Erpen (yellow card) 35'; Bryan Namoff (yellow card) 40'; Kevin Goldthwaite 53' (o.g.); Jaime Moreno 79' (pen.)	Stadium: BMO Field; Attendance: 20,183; Referee: Baldomero Toledo

May 26, 2007	Columbus Crew	2–2	Toronto FC	Columbus, Ohio
	Andy Herron 2'; Andy Herron (yellow card) 3'; Andy Herron 36'; Guillermo Barros Schelotto (yellow card) 78'	(report)	Danny Dichio 27'; Jim Brennan 49'; Jim Brennan (yellow card) 89'	Stadium: Columbus Crew Stadium; Attendance: 11,755; Referee: Ricardo Salazar

June 2, 2007	Toronto FC	2–1	Colorado Rapids	Toronto
	Danny Dichio 9'; Danny Dichio (yellow card) 19'; Andrew Boyens 28'; Kevin Goldthwaite (red card) 81'; Srdjan Djekanovic (yellow card) 93+'	(report)	Herculez Gomez 32'; Herculez Gomez (yellow card) 75'	Stadium: BMO Field; Attendance: 20,195; Referee: Steven DePiero

June 6, 2007	Toronto FC	1–2	New York Red Bulls	Toronto
	Jeff Cunningham 23'	(report)	Markus Schopp (yellow card) 33'; Juan Pablo Angel 69'; Juan Pablo Angel 71'	Stadium: BMO Field; Attendance: 20,113; Referee: Tim Weyland

June 17, 2007	Toronto FC	4–0	FC Dallas	Toronto
	Maurice Edu 22'; Maurice Edu (yellow card) 23'; Danny Dichio 25'; Jeff Cunningham (yellow card) 39'; Carl Robinson 65'; Jeff Cunningham 92+'	(report)	Marcelo Saragosa (yellow card) 46+'; Dominic Oduro (yellow card) 53'; Carlos Ruiz (yellow card) 54'; Chris Gbandi (yellow card) 60'	Stadium: BMO Field; Attendance: 20,156; Referee: Silviu Petrescu

June 23, 2007	New England Revolution	3–0	Toronto FC	Foxborough, Massachusetts
	Andy Dorman 13'; Pat Noonan 33'; Andy Dorman 81'; Khano Smith (yellow card) 83'	(report)	Kevin Goldthwaite (yellow card) 21'; Srdjan Djekanovic (yellow card) 50'; Danny Dichio (yellow card) 70'; Marvell Wynne (yellow card) 91+'	Stadium: Gillette Stadium; Attendance: 10,114; Referee: Alex Prus

July 1, 2007	Kansas City Wizards	1–1	Toronto FC	Kansas City, Missouri
	Michael Harrington 18'; Jose Burciaga Jr. (yellow card) 40'; Davy Arnaud (yellow card) 85'	(report)	Danny Dichio 46'; Andrew Boyens (yellow card) 48' (yellow-red card) 76'	Stadium: Arrowhead Stadium; Attendance: 9,485; Referee: Ricardo Salazar

July 4, 2007	Real Salt Lake	1–2	Toronto FC	Salt Lake City, Utah
	Alecko Eskandarian 45' (pen.); Ritchie Kotschau (yellow card) 63'; Atiba Harris (yellow card) 75'	(report)	Jeff Cunningham 19'; Chris Pozniak (yellow card) 44'; Jeff Cunningham (yellow card) 46+'; Colin Samuel 79' (pen.); Srdjan Djekanovic (yellow card) 88'; Ronnie O'Brien (yellow card) 90'	Stadium: Rice-Eccles Stadium; Attendance: 20,751; Referee: Jair Marrufo

July 7, 2007	Chicago Fire	1–1	Toronto FC	Bridgeview, Illinois
	C.J. Brown (yellow card) 31'; Chad Barrett 70' (pen.)	(report)	Maurice Edu (yellow card) 34'; Jim Brennan (yellow card) 69'; Chris Pozniak (yellow card) 76'; Maurice Edu 78'	Stadium: Toyota Park; Attendance: 13,080; Referee: Mark Geiger

July 15, 2007	Houston Dynamo	0–0	Toronto FC	Houston, Texas
	Eddie Robinson (yellow card) 66'	(report)	Maurice Edu (red card) 42'; Carl Robinson (yellow card) 53'	Stadium: Robertson Stadium; Attendance: 11,114; Referee: Abiodun Okulaja

July 22, 2007	Columbus Crew	2–0	Toronto FC	Columbus, Ohio
	Guillermo Barros Schelotto 50'; Guillermo Barros Schelotto 56'	(report)	Tyrone Marshall (yellow card) 46+'	Stadium: Columbus Crew Stadium; Attendance: 13,479; Referee: Michael Kennedy

July 29, 2007	Toronto FC	0–3	Chicago Fire	Toronto
	Andy Welsh (yellow card) 10'; Collin Samuel (yellow card) 42'	(report)	Calen Carr (yellow card) 13'; Iván Guerrero 37'; Chad Barrett (yellow card) 44'; Calen Carr 58'; Floyd Franks 75'	Stadium: BMO Field; Attendance: 20,322; Referee: Jair Marrufo

August 5, 2007	Toronto FC	0–0	Los Angeles Galaxy	Toronto
	Carl Robinson (yellow card) 32'; Maurice Edu (yellow card) 82'	(report)	Kelly Gray (yellow card) 24'; Kevin Harmse (yellow card) 50'; Ante Jazic (yellow card) 72'	Stadium: BMO Field; Attendance: 20,522; Referee: Mauricio Navarro

August 12, 2007	New York Red Bulls	3–0	Toronto FC	East Rutherford, New Jersey
	Juan Pablo Angel 24'; Jozy Altidore 50'; Jozy Altidore 63'	(report)	Collin Samuel (yellow card) 11'; Chris Pozniak (red card) 65'	Stadium: Giants Stadium; Attendance: 12,103; Referee: Alex Prus

August 18, 2007	Toronto FC	0–2	Chivas USA	Toronto
		(report)	Maykel Galindo 57'; Sacha Kljestan 89'; Jason Hernandez (yellow card) 81'; Brad Guzan (yellow card) 92+'	Stadium: BMO Field; Attendance: 20,178; Referee: Brian Hall

August 25, 2007	Toronto FC	0–1	D.C. United	Toronto
	Todd Dunivant (yellow card) 55'; Adam Braz (yellow card) 64'; Carl Robinson (yellow card) 89'	(report)	Fred 8'; Rod Dyachenko (yellow card) 39'; Brian Carroll (yellow card) 56'; Jaime Moreno (yellow card) 63'; Christian Gomez (yellow card) 84'	Stadium: BMO Field; Attendance: 20,093; Referee: Silviu Petrescu

September 8, 2007	FC Dallas	2–0	Toronto FC	Frisco, Texas
	Aaron Pitchkolan (yellow card) 11'; Denilson 36' (pen.); Denilson (yellow card) 70'; Abe Thompson 87' (pen.)	(report)	Tyrone Marshall (yellow card) 33'; Andrea Lombardo (yellow card) 34'; Joey Melo (yellow card) 86'	Stadium: Pizza Hut Park; Attendance: 16,790; Referee: Hilario Grajeda

September 15, 2007	Toronto FC	0–0	Real Salt Lake	Toronto
	Tyrone Marshall (yellow card) 22'; Andrew Boyens (yellow card) 31'; Adam Braz (yellow card) 67'	(report)	Javier Morales (yellow card) 17'; Fabian Espindola (red card) 35'; Alecko Eskandarian (yellow card) 48'; Matias Mantilla (yellow card) 93+'	Stadium: BMO Field; Attendance: 20,098; Referee: Tim Weyland

September 22, 2007	Toronto FC	1–2	Columbus Crew	Toronto
	Miguel Canizalez 2'	(report)	Jason Garey 61'; Jacob Thomas 83'	Stadium: BMO Field; Attendance: 20,127; Referee: Steven DePiero

September 29, 2007	D.C. United	4–1	Toronto FC	Washington, D.C.
	Bobby Boswell (yellow card) 25'; Devon McTavish (yellow card) 40'; Marc Burch 52'; Fred 57'; Jaime Moreno 66'; Luciano Emilio 70'; Ben Olsen (yellow card) 84'	(report)	Tyrone Marshall (yellow card) 11'; Carl Robinson 14'; Adam Braz (yellow card) 45'	Stadium: Robert F. Kennedy Memorial Stadium; Attendance: 25,174; Referee: Ramón Hernández

October 4, 2007	Toronto FC	2–1	New York Red Bulls	Toronto
	Maurice Edu 18'; Jim Brennan (yellow card) 20'; Maurice Edu (yellow card) 40'; Carl Robinson (yellow card) 46'; Chris Leitch 66' (o.g.); Andrew Boyens (red card) 67'	(report)	Dema Kovalenko (yellow card) 17'; Joe Vide (yellow card) 23' (yellow-red card) 64'; Jozy Altidore (yellow card) 57'; Dane Richards 75'	Stadium: BMO Field; Attendance: 20,274; Referee: Mauricio Navarro

October 7, 2007	Colorado Rapids	1–0	Toronto FC	Commerce City, Colorado
	Pablo Mastroeni (yellow card) 17' (yellow-red card) 88'; Mehdi Ballouchy (red card) 36'; Jovan Kirovski 44' (pen.)	(report)	Adam Braz (yellow card) 27'; Carl Robinson (yellow card) 85'	Stadium: Dick's Sporting Goods Park; Attendance: 10,832; Referee: Kevin Stott

October 13, 2007	Los Angeles Galaxy	2–1	Toronto FC	Carson, California
	Landon Donovan 56' (pen.); Edson Buddle 78'	(report)	Adam Braz (yellow card) 35'; Marco Reda (red card) 54'; Colin Samuel 68'	Stadium: The Home Depot Center; Attendance: 27,000; Referee: Terry Vaughn

October 20, 2007	Toronto FC	2–2	New England Revolution	Toronto
	Andrea Lombardo (yellow card) 7'; Carl Robinson (yellow card) 43'; Colin Samuel 59'; Danny Dichio 92+'	(report)	Michael Parkhurst 47+'; Wells Thompson (yellow card) 42'; Taylor Twellman 47'	Stadium: BMO Field; Attendance: 20,374; Referee: Steven DePiero

=== Mid-season friendlies ===
May 23, 2007	Toronto FC	0–0	Benfica	Toronto
	Andrea Lombardo (yellow card) 36'	(report)	David Luiz (yellow card) 58'	Stadium: BMO Field; Attendance: 18,730

July 25, 2007	Toronto FC	2–4	Aston Villa	Toronto
	Todd Dunivant 50'; Andrea Lombardo 62'	(report)	Luke Moore 11'; Luke Moore 18'; John Carew 82'; Luke Moore 92+'	Stadium: BMO Field; Attendance: 20,147

October 28, 2007	Portland Timbers	4–1	Toronto FC	Portland, Oregon
	Jordan 19', 20'; Guante 43'; Olum 77'	(report)	25' Pozniak	Stadium: PGE Park; Attendance: 6,614; Referee: Jorge Oconitrillo (USA)

== Appearances ==
Competitive matches only.

Name	Nation	MLS 2007 season			
Name	Nation	Appearances	Games started	Goals	Shutouts
Jim Brennan	(Canada)	27	27	1	
Carl Robinson	(Wales)	26	26	2	
Maurice Edu	(United States)	25	25	4	
Andrew Boyens	(New Zealand)	23	21	1	
Marvell Wynne	(United States)	22	21	0	
Chris Pozniak	(Canada)	19	13	0	
Collin Samuel	(Trinidad and Tobago)	18	18	3	
Todd Dunivant	(United States)	18	18	0	
Andy Welsh	(Scotland)	18	15	1	
Danny Dichio	(England)	17	14	6	
Tyrone Marshall	(Jamaica)	16	16	0	
Jeff Cunningham	(United States)	16	13	3	
Andrea Lombardo	(Canada)	16	6	0	
Ronnie O'Brien	(Republic of Ireland)	13	13	0	
Adam Braz	(Canada)	13	9	0	
Kenny Stamatopoulos	(Canada)	12	12		2
Miguel Cañizalez	(Canada)	12	5	1	
Edson Buddle	(United States)	9	5	0	
Greg Sutton	(Canada)	8	8		1
Srdjan Djekanovic	(Canada)	8	7		1
Marco Reda	(Canada)	8	7	0	
Kevin Goldthwaite	(United States)	7	7	1	
Alecko Eskandarian	(United States)	5	5	1	
Gabe Gala	(Canada)	5	3	0	
Joey Melo	(Canada)	5	0	0	
Paulo Nagamura	(Brazil)	3	3	0	
Sam Reynolds	(United States)	2	2		0
Tyler Hemming	(Canada)	4	2	0	
Richard Mulrooney	(United States)	2	2	0	
Conor Casey	(United States)	2	0	0	
David Monsalve	(Canada)	1	1		0
Abbe Ibrahim	(Togo)	1	0	0	

== Goals ==
#	Name	Nation	MLS Goals
1	Danny Dichio	(England)	6
2	Maurice Edu	(United States)	4
3	Jeff Cunningham	(United States)	3
3	Collin Samuel	(Trinidad and Tobago)	3
5	Carl Robinson	(Wales)	2
6	Andrew Boyens	(New Zealand)	1
6	Jim Brennan	(Canada)	1
6	Miguel Cañizalez	(Canada)	1
6	Alecko Eskandarian	(United States)	1
6	Kevin Goldthwaite	(United States)	1
6	Andy Welsh	(Scotland)	1

== Reserve appearances ==
MLS reserve matches only.

Note: missing statistics from the following reserve matches:

- Colorado Rapids Reserves 3–0 Toronto FC Reserves, October 7, 2007

#	Name	Nation	MLS Reserve Division 2007			
#	Name	Nation	Appearances	Games started	Goals	Shutouts
1	David Guzman	(Canada)	11	11	2	
2	Cristian Nuñez	(Canada)	11	11	0	
3	Joey Melo	(Canada)	10	10	0	
4	Stephen Lumley	(Canada)	10	8	0	
5	Gabe Gala	(Canada)	9	9	1	
6	Srdjan Djekanovic	(Canada)	9	6		4
7	Miguel Cañizalez	(Canada)	8	8	3	
8	Tyler Hemming	(Canada)	8	8	1	
9	Nana Attakora-Gyan	(Canada)	6	6	0	
10	Andrea Lombardo	(Canada)	6	5	3	
	Adam Braz	(Canada)	5	5	1	
	Marco Reda	(Canada)	4	3	1	
	Evan Milward	(Canada)	4	3	0	
	David Monsalve	(Canada)	3	3		0
	Desmond Humphries	(Canada)	3	2	0	
	Abbe Ibrahim	(Togo)	3	2	0	
	Kayin Jeffers	(Canada)	3	2	0	
	A. J. Gray	(Canada)	3	1	0	
	Ryan Fante	(Canada)	3	1	0	
	Nikola Budalić	(Canada)	2	2	1	
	Richard Asante	(Canada)	2	2	0	
	Chris Pozniak	(Canada)	2	2	0	
	Tomer Chencinski	(Canada)	2	2		0
	Jason Dethomasis	(Canada)	2	0	1	
	Andrew Boyens	(New Zealand)	1	1	0	
	Cameron Medwin	(Canada)	1	1	0	
	Edson Buddle	(United States)	1	1	0	
	Conor Casey	(United States)	1	1	0	
	Alex Bengard	(United States)	1	1	0	
	Jason Boyce	(Canada)	1	1	0	
	Shane Lammie	(Canada)	1	0	0	
	Frank Bruno	(Canada)	1	0	0	
	David Adams	?	1	0	0	
	Nick Kohlschriber	(United States)	1	0	0	
	Sam Reynolds	(United States)	1	0	0	
