= Labbe =

Labbe or Labbé may refer to:

== People ==
- A variation of the surname Abbé
- Anthony L'Abbé Royal Dancing Master to the Princeses of George II
- Alex Labbé (born 1993), Canadian stock car racer
- Arnaud Labbe (born 1976), French professional racing cyclist'
- Bastián Labbé (born 1990), Chilean teacher
- Carlos Labbé (born 1977), Chilean writer
- Carlos Labbé Márquez (1876–1941), Chilean bishop
- Charles Labbé (1851–1889), French doctor
- Cristián Labbé Martínez (born 1980), Chilean politician
- François Labbé (1928–2018), Canadian mass media businessman; son of Tancrède Labbé
- Gilles Labbé (born 1948), Quebecois politician
- Jean-François Labbé (born 1972), Canadian professional ice-hockey player
- Léon Labbé (1832–1916), French doctor and politician
- Marc-Antoine Labbé-Fortin (born 1987), Canadian football player
- María Luisa Mayol Labbé (born 1981), Chilean actress
- Martine Labbé (born 1958), Belgian operations researcher
- Matthieu Labbé (born 1985), French football player
- Philippe Labbe (1607–1667), French Jesuit writer
- Philippe Labbé, French chef
- Pierre-Luc Labbé (born 1984), Canadian football player
- Slugger Labbe (born 1968), crew chief on the American NASCAR racing circuit
- Stephanie Labbé (born 1986), Canadian soccer player
- Tancrède Labbé (1887–1956), Canadian politician and businessman; father of François Labbé

== Places ==
- Labbé Point, a point of land projecting into Discovery Bay, Antarctica
- Labbé Rock, a landmark lying off the coast of Largo Island, near the Antarctic Peninsula
- Lycée Valentine Labbé, a French senior high school
- Rhum Vieux Labbé, a brand of Haitian rum
