= Abbe =

Abbe may refer to:

== People ==
- Abbe (name)

== Places ==
- Abbe (crater), a lunar impact crater that is located in the southern hemisphere on the far side of the Moon
- Lake Abbe, African lake
- Abbe Falls, waterfalls in India

== Other uses ==
- Abbé, the French word for an abbot or lower-ranking Catholic clergy in France
- Abbe condenser, a component of a microscope
- Abbe lip switch, a method of lip reconstruction
- Abbe number, a measure of the material's optical dispersion
- Abbe prism, a type of constant deviation dispersive prism similar to a Pellin–Broca prism
- Abbe refractometer, a bench-top refractometer that offers the highest precision of the different types of refractometers
- Abbe sine condition, a condition that must be fulfilled by a lens or other optical system in order for it to produce sharp images of off-axis as well as on-axis objects
- Abbe Creek School, historical school house in Iowa, US

== See also ==
- L'Abbé (disambiguation)
