= Mowshowitz =

Mowshowitz is a surname. Notable people with the surname include:

- Abbe Mowshowitz (born 1939), American computer scientist
- Deborah Mowshowitz (fl. 1969), American biochemist
- Zvi Mowshowitz (born 1979), American Magic: The Gathering player
