= Abbe (name) =

Abbe is both a surname and a given name. As a surname, Abbé is of French origin (from abed (Arabic: عابد), "priest"), either as critical nickname for a sanctimonious person or as an occupational surname for someone working in the household of a priest. Among the variants of Abbe are Labbé, Labbey (see below) and Labbez. Independently, Abbe is considered one variant of Abbey.

Notable people with the name include:

Surname:

- Caroline Abbé (born 1988), Swiss footballer
- Cleveland Abbe (1838–1916), American meteorologist
- Cleveland Abbe Jr. (1872–1934), American geographer
- Elfriede Abbe (1919–2012), American sculptor
- Ernst Abbe (1840–1905), German physicist
- Franz Abbé (1874–1936), German gymnast
- George Abbe (1911–1989), American poet
- Godwin Abbe (1949–2024), Nigerian politician
- Hendrik Abbé (flourished 1600s), Flemish artist
- James Abbe (1883–1975), American photographer
- Kathryn Abbe (1919–2014), American photographer
- Kenshiro Abbe (1915–1985), Japanese martial artist
- Louis Jean Nicolas Abbé (1764–1834), French general
- Maurice L'Abbé (1920–2006), Canadian academic and mathematician
- Moe L'Abbé (1947–2024), Canadian hockey player
- Patience Abbe (1924–2012), American writer
- Robert Abbe (1851–1928), American surgeon and radiologist
- Sonnet L'Abbé, Canadian poet, editor, professor and critic
- Truman Abbe (1873–1955), American surgeon
- William Abbe (1800–1854), Iowa state senator

Surname variant Labbey:

- Nadège Labbey (born 1979), French rugby player

Given name:

- Abbe Borg (born 1943), Swedish esports player
- Abbe Carter Goodloe (1867–1960), American writer
- Abbe Lane (born 1932), American singer and actress
- Abbe Lowell (born 1952), American defense attorney
- Abbe May (born 1983), Australian singer-songwriter, musician, and human rights campaigner
- Abbe Mowshowitz (born 1939), American academic and professor
- Abbe Raven (flourished 2010s), American businesswoman
- Abbe Smith (born 1956), American criminal defense attorney and professor of law
- Abbe Schulties (born 2002), American actress

Nickname:

- Abdoulaye (Abbe) Ibrahim (born 1986), Togolese soccer player
- Fulbert Youlou (1917–1972), first President of Congo-Brazzaville, known as Abbé
- Joseph-Barnabé Saint-Sevin dit L'Abbé le Fils (1727–1803), French composer and violinist

Pseudonym:

- Jean-Hippolyte Michon (1806–1881), French priest, archaeologist, and the founder of graphology, used the name "L’Abbé ***" to publish Le Jésuite in 1865

Title:

- Abbé Adam (flourished 14th century), French priest
- Abbé Aubert (1731–1814), French writer
- Abbé Faria (Portuguese: Abade Faria), or Abbé (Abbot) José Custódio de Faria (31 May 1756 – 20 September 1819), Luso-Goan Catholic monk who pioneered of the scientific study of hypnosis
- Abbé François Blanchet (1707–1784), French littérateur
- Abbé Larudan (flourished 18th century), anonymous French writer
- Abbé Pierre (1912–2007), French Roman Catholic priest
- Abbé Prévost (1697–1763), French novelist

== See also ==
- Abbé people, Ethnic group, primarily in Ivory Coast
- Abbé Martin (disambiguation)
- Salomon van Abbé (1883–1955), Amsterdam artist
