= BMO Field =

Stadium in Toronto

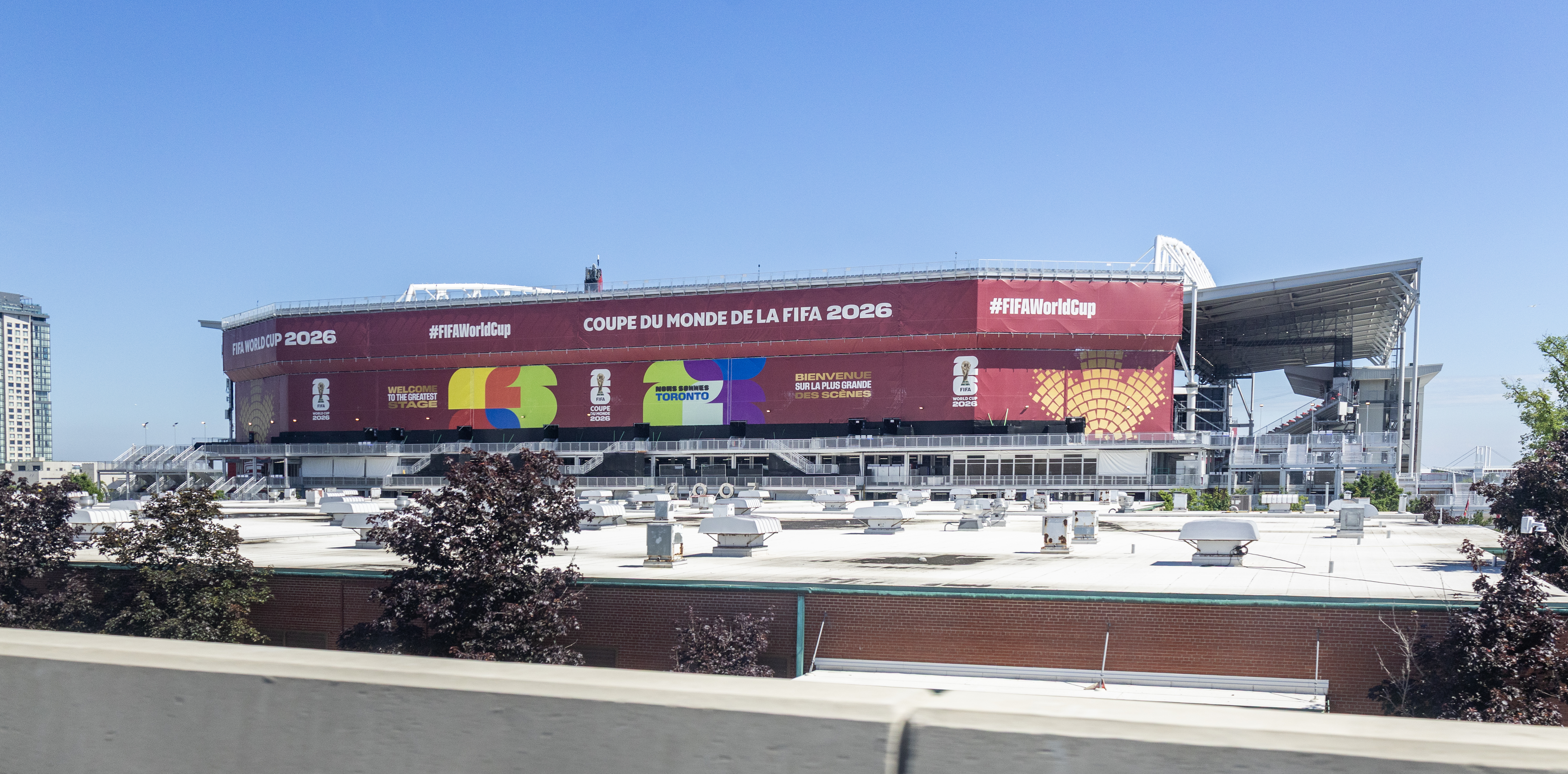
- BMO Field in June 2026 during the 2026 FIFA World Cup

- Location in Toronto Location in Southern Ontario Location in Ontario Location in Canada
- Former names: National Soccer Stadium (2014 FIFA U-20 Women's World Cup); Toronto Stadium (2026 FIFA World Cup)
- Address: 170 Princes' Boulevard
- Location: Toronto, Ontario, Canada
- Coordinates: 43°38′0″N 79°25′07″W
- Elevation: 75 m (246 ft) AMSL
- Owner: City of Toronto
- Operator: Maple Leaf Sports & Entertainment
- Capacity: 28,351
- Surface: FieldTurf (2007–2009); Kentucky bluegrass (2010–2019); Hybrid grass (2019–present) (Note: North side FieldTurf end-zone for Canadian football)
- Record attendance: 44,828 (Toronto FC vs. Inter Miami CF, May 9, 2026; 6 months ago)
- Field size: 105 m × 68 m (115 yd × 74 yd) (soccer); 146 yd × 65 yd (134 m × 59 m) (Canadian football)
- Public transit: Exhibition GO Buses/Streetcars: 504B King; 509 Harbourfront; 511 Bathurst; 29 Dufferin; 929 Dufferin Express; 329 Dufferin

Construction
- Groundbreaking: March 29, 2006
- Opened: April 28, 2007; 19 years ago
- Expanded: 2010; 2014–16
- Cost: Can$62.9 million ($92.6 million in 2025 dollars); Renovations: 2010: $5.5 million ($7.75 million in 2025 dollars); Expansions: 2014–2016: $120 million ($169 million in 2025 dollars)
- Architects: Brisbin Brooks Beynon Architects (BBB Architects), Gensler (expansion)
- Project managers: PMX, Inc.
- Structural engineer: Halcrow Yolles
- Services engineer: The Mitchell Partnership Inc.
- General contractor: PCL Construction

Tenants
- Toronto FC (MLS) 2007–present; Canada men's soccer team 2007–present (intermittent); Toronto Argonauts (CFL) 2016–present; Toronto Nationals (MLL) 2009; AFC Toronto (NSL) 2025 - present; Toronto FC II (USL) 2018

Website
- bmofield.com

BMO Field is an outdoor stadium located at Exhibition Place in Toronto, Ontario, Canada. Constructed on the former Exhibition Stadium site and first opened in 2007, it is the home field of Toronto FC of Major League Soccer (MLS) and the Toronto Argonauts of the Canadian Football League (CFL). BMO Field is owned by the City of Toronto and managed by Maple Leaf Sports & Entertainment, which owns both Toronto FC and the Argonauts. The stadium's naming rights are held by the Bank of Montreal, which is commonly branded as "BMO" (/ˈbiːmoʊ/). It was one of two Canadian stadiums which hosted matches of the 2026 FIFA World Cup; a temporary expansion for the tournament brought the stadium's capacity to 45,736 seats.

BMO Field was originally constructed as a soccer-specific stadium for the 2007 FIFA U-20 World Cup and first home for Toronto FC. It hosted matches during the 2007 FIFA U-20 World Cup and 2014 FIFA U-20 Women's World Cup. In 2010, when it was still a neutral-site game, BMO Field hosted the MLS Cup. It has since hosted the 2016 and 2017 finals featuring Toronto FC, under the current practice of giving home field advantage to the side with the better regular-season record. The venue has also hosted rugby union, including matches of Canada's national team, and rugby sevens during the 2015 Pan-American Games.

From 2014 to 2016, the stadium underwent a series of major renovations: an upper deck to the east grandstand, a roof over the seating areas, and a lengthened field for Canadian football. The CFL's Argonauts moved to BMO Field in 2016 and later that season, the stadium hosted the 104th Grey Cup.

== Construction ==
BMO Field is the fifth stadium to be built at its exact location at Exhibition Place. The most recent was Exhibition Stadium, which lost its two primary tenants, the Argonauts and the Toronto Blue Jays of Major League Baseball (MLB), with the 1989 opening of SkyDome (now Rogers Centre). Exhibition Stadium was demolished in 1999.

A number of proposals to build a stadium in Toronto were considered in the 2000s. The Argonauts submitted a proposal to the city to renovate Lamport Stadium and expand its capacity to 19,000. In March 2003, the proposal was modified to constructing a new 22,000-seat stadium at Exhibition Place. That July the Canadian Soccer Association (CSA) announced separate plans for a 30,000 seat $82 million stadium at the site, to host the 2007 FIFA U-20 World Cup which it had bid on. The governments of Canada and Ontario agreed to provide a combined CA$35 million in funding for a new stadium if the CSA was successful in acquiring the rights to the tournament. At the time, Maple Leaf Sports & Entertainment (MLSE), owners of the National Hockey League's Toronto Maple Leafs and the National Basketball Association's Toronto Raptors, was also looking for a stadium to host a new Major League Soccer (MLS) team they were considering launching. The league considered soccer-specific stadiums to be necessary for an expansion franchise to be granted, due to the improved atmosphere and control of revenue streams.

The Argonauts, CSA and MLSE agreed to partner to build a new 25,000-seat, $80 million Varsity Stadium on the University of Toronto (U of T)'s St. George campus. Aside from the committed government funding, $15 million was to come from the U of T, which would own the stadium, and a $30 million loan would be taken out by the university with the annual $2.1 million financing charges paid by the Argos. However, MLSE backed out of the stadium due to a lack of financial return, and the deal ultimately fell through in 2004 when the university's new president withdrew his support after its cost rose over $100 million.

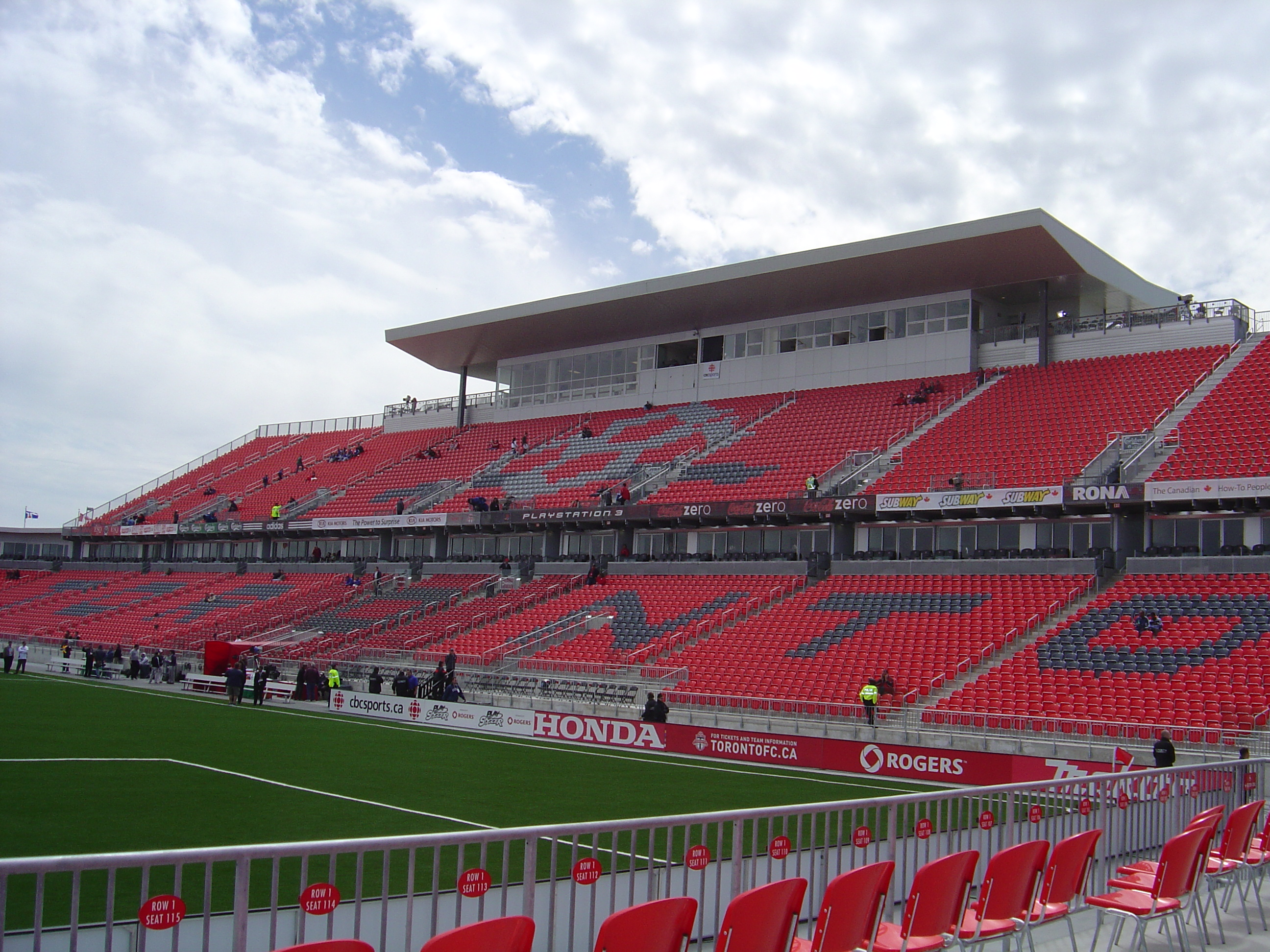
Stands at BMO Field several weeks after it opened in 2007. The stadium was initially built with only 25,000 seats.

Later that year, the Argos and CSA announced plans to build a 25,000-seat, $70 million stadium at York University, which would contribute the land and $15 million, with the Argos adding $20 million to the government funding. MLSE was not involved in this project. However, the Argos pulled out of the stadium after signing a new 15-year lease at Rogers Centre with significantly reduced rent.

In 2005, the stadium site was moved back to Exhibition Place, on the location of the demolished Exhibition Stadium and then-existing Sports Hall of Fame building, in a partnership between MLSE and the CSA. With a total cost of $62.9 million (all figures are in Canadian dollars) to build the stadium ($72.8 million including the land), financial contributions came from multiple sources. The Canadian Federal Government contributed $27 million, the Government of Ontario added an additional $8 million, and the City of Toronto paid $9.8 million and contributed the land for the project (valued at $10 million), while retaining ownership of the stadium. MLSE contributed $8 million towards construction costs and was responsible for any cost overruns. In return, they got the management rights for the stadium. MLSE committed to purchase a MLS soccer team to play in the stadium. The remaining funds came from MLSE, which paid $10 million for the naming rights of the stadium for the duration of the 20-year management agreement, which they later resold to the Bank of Montreal (BMO) for $27 million over the first 10 years.

The proposal approved by the City of Toronto was for a stadium that was "capable of a conversion to a football format." The Argonauts attempted to join the project at the last minute, but MLSE, citing budget and time limitations, constructed the stadium such that it could not fit a CFL field without demolition and reconstruction of the end zone stands.

The field of play dimensions are 74 yards (68 m) wide × 115 yards (105 m) long, meeting FIFA standards. The stadium features seats that are entirely red with the exception of a design on each of the main stands. On the east side the design is a large maple leaf, while on the lower west stand the design spells out "TORONTO" and has a portion of the Toronto FC logo. The south stand has "BMO" spelled out.

On May 11, 2006, Major League Soccer announced that Toronto FC would join the league as its 13th (and first Canada-based) team in 2007, with BMO Field serving as its home.

=== Renovations ===
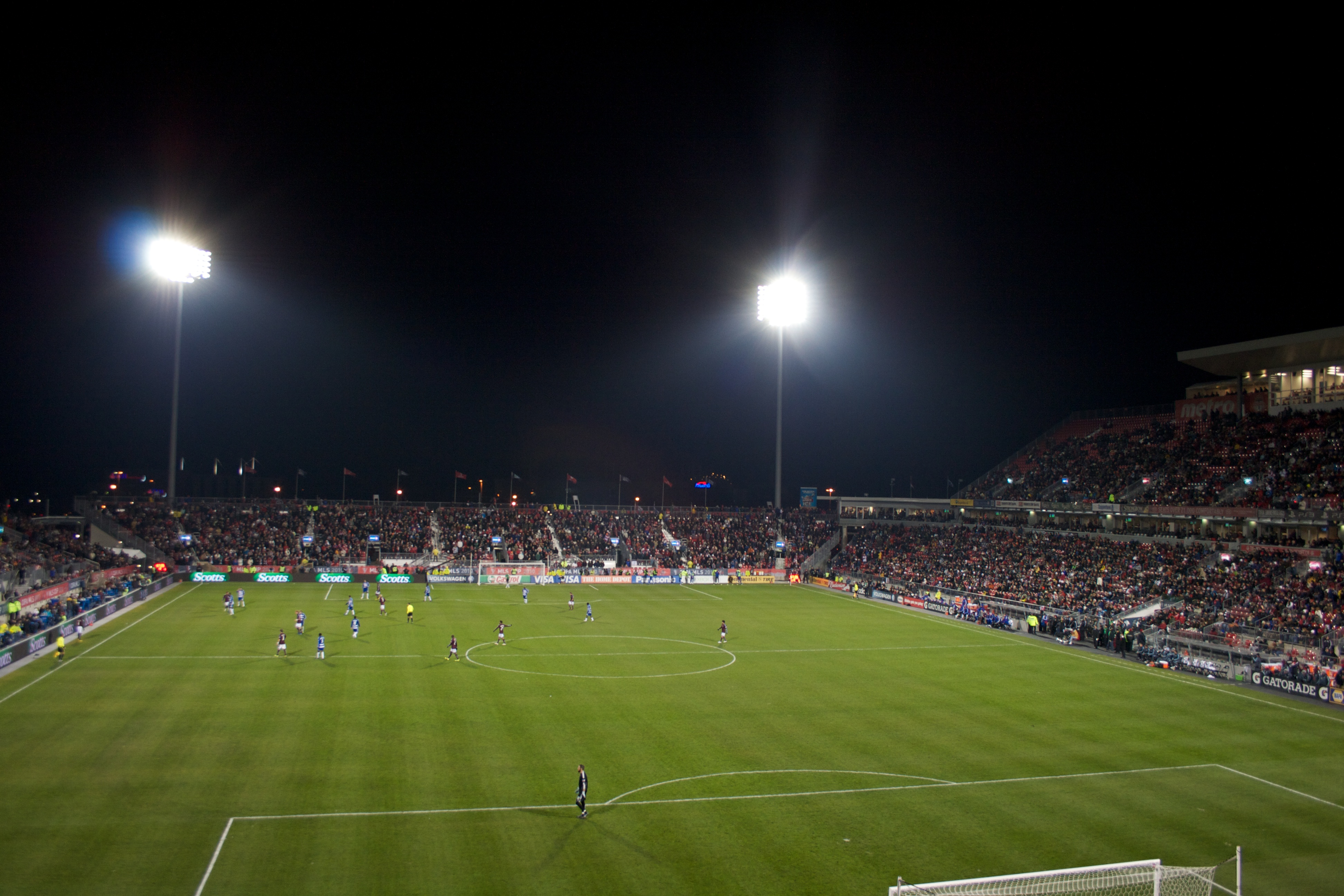
BMO Field in November 2010, several months after it switched from FieldTurf to natural grass.

BMO Field originally used FieldTurf rather than a natural grass pitch, which attracted some criticism. A temporary grass turf was laid in August 2009 for a friendly against Real Madrid. Prior to the 2010 season Toronto City Council approved MLSE's request to convert the stadium to natural grass. MLSE paid the $3.5 million for the conversion, and promised to cover all additional costs to maintain the surface. A type of Kentucky Bluegrass was installed in the spring of 2010, along with a state of the art drainage system and heating system in the field. MLSE spent a further $2 million to expand the north end by 1,400 seats for the 2010 season. As part of the deal to convert the field to natural grass, MLSE spent $1.2 million adding a winter bubble to Lamport Stadium and $800,000 building a new artificial turf field to replace the community use hours lost at BMO. By the end of the 2010 renovation, the total cost came to $5.5 million CAD.

In November 2009, it became public that the Toronto Argonauts were in discussions with the City of Toronto over the possibility of moving from Rogers Centre to BMO Field, potentially as early as the 2010 CFL season. The CFL agreed to study the feasibility of the Argos playing at BMO Field, which was built too short to fit a full-length Canadian football field despite the requirement that the stadium be convertible to CFL configuration in the original stadium agreement. According to Tom Anselmi, former executive vice-president and chief operating officer with MLSE, without significant renovations BMO Field could only fit a 100-yard field with 15-yard end zones or a 110-yard field with 10-yard end zones, which is 20 yards shorter than the standard 110-yard field and 20-yard end zones. On December 16, 2009, the Argonauts officially abandoned the idea, after the CFL concluded that the venue was not suitable for Canadian football in its current state.

Anselmi indicated in 2009 that a second level could be added to the east side stands and extra rows added to the south side stands, which would add an additional 8,400 seats, for approximately $15 million. Following Tim Leiweke taking over as president of MLSE in June 2013, he began discussing the company's plans for a major renovation of the stadium. In early January 2014, Leiweke said that the next six months would be spent consulting with experts to determine the feasibility of the project.

As the stadium is owned by the City of Toronto, its consent is required for any modifications. The City insisted that any renovations included making the playing surface longer to fit a CFL field so that it could accommodate the Argonauts, who had to vacate the Rogers Centre by the end of the 2017 season. Mark Grimes, chairman of Exhibition Place's board, began negotiating with MLSE on the project and said, "I think I have Mr. Leiweke's ear in that I am a big CFL fan and that we need to get the Argos on stable ground." Deputy Mayor Norm Kelly said that "the Argos have got to play there" and that "I think there is a very good chance that they will." On February 25, Grimes said that a deal was "getting close" and could be reached "in the next couple weeks". Preliminary plans were released to the public on March 5.

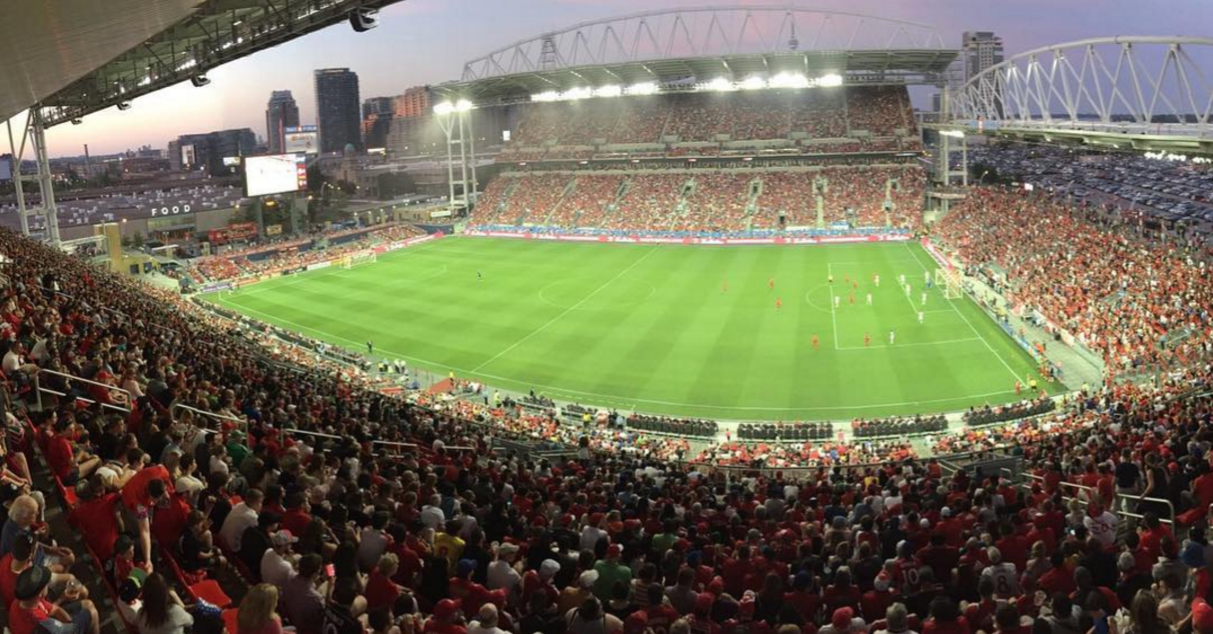
BMO Field in June 2016, shortly after an expansion to raise the stadium's seating capacity was completed.

In addition to making the field compatible for CFL games, the upgrades, which were originally budgeted for $115–120 million, added a new upper deck on the east side, raising capacity from 21,566 seats to 30,000 for soccer, with 26,500 seats in CFL configuration, and it is temporarily expandable with additional end zone seating to 40,000 for big events such as the rugby sevens at the 2015 Pan-Am games, NHL outdoor games, Grey Cup, MLS Cup, Summer Olympic Games, or a successful 2026 FIFA World Cup by Canada.

The plans called for $30 million retractable end zone seating in the south and a retractable terrace in the north end to ensure that fans aren't farther from the playing surface in soccer configuration due to the longer CFL field, and a roof over most permanent seating areas. Leiweke promised that the soccer playing surface will remain natural grass. A reinforced hybrid playing surface such as Desso GrassMaster, in which artificial fibres are embedded in the turf to allow for the grass roots to intertwine with them to strengthen the pitch, was originally under consideration, but concerns that this would complicate repairs to the pitch led MLSE to decide against it. A $1 million subsurface heating system and a $1 million artificial lighting system were installed to encourage grass growth, and MLSE secured an exemption to use pesticides on the field. Portions of the CFL end zones are artificial turf. Removable paint is used for lining the field to allow for the football lines to be removed prior to soccer games. As well, the field has two football goalpost configurations so that the same grass isn't relined every game. Under a two-phase process, the field was lengthened and capacity of the stadium increased for $77 million by May 1, 2015, with the roof added by May 1, 2016, for $43 million.

Leiweke in the past had said that even without an expansion the stadium needed $30 million in repairs, and that the original agreement called for the city and MLSE to split that bill equally. Instead, MLSE looked for $10 million in public funding from each of the municipal, provincial, and federal governments to top up their $90 million contribution, plus any cost overruns, for the expansion. MLSE argued that the new stadium would result in $8 million in economic benefits, including taxes, accruing to the province annually, and $18 million in taxes on the construction project. The company agreed to pay a fixed annual rental fee of $865,000 to the city for the upgraded stadium, rather than the variable revenue sharing model under the present agreement which returned an average of $397,000 to the city over the previous five years, to help ensure that the city recoups its investment. The new arrangement guaranteed the city $25.4 million, and with the projected $6 million in parking revenues the $31 million in revenue over the term of the lease would be $19 million more than under the former agreement. As manager of the stadium, MLSE gets any profit turned by the stadium, and is responsible for any losses. MLSE's management and naming rights agreement for the stadium, which was set to expire in 2027, were extended by 10 years under the proposal. The agreement requires MLSE to reach a "long-term use (i.e., 20 years)" lease with the Toronto Argonauts for usage of the stadium starting in 2015.

The proposed renovations were unanimously approved by the Board of Governors of Exhibition Place on March 7, and the City of Toronto's Executive Committee gave their consent on March 19. The full City Council approved the deal on April 3, and the agreement is planned to be finalized by June 15. Provincial Minister of Tourism and Culture Michael Chan said that MLSE has submitted a funding request and that "we are looking at it", while the Federal Infrastructure Minister Denis Lebel's spokesperson said that "the federal government has no program to fund professional sports facilities". A spokesperson for Lebel would later say "our government will not fund the BMO Field as long as it is used by a professional sports team". However, according to Leiweke, the federal funding "is not going to the stadium, their money is going to host big events." In another interview, he said "the feds are giving us the resources to (temporarily) expand to 40,000 for our Grey Cup bids and Winter Classic bids".

By late May 2014, MLSE had not reached a financing agreement with either the federal or provincial governments to fill the $20 million funding gap. The fall of the government of Ontario, with an election scheduled for June 12, prevented them from approving their share of the funding. With deadlines approaching to start construction to ensure that the stadium was ready for the 2015 Pan-Am games, MLSE decided to move forward with the first phase of the renovation without first securing further funding commitments from the government. The revised plan proposed a $65 million addition of an upper east deck in the first phase, and $40 million addition of a canopy in the second phase. The lengthening of the field to make it CFL compatible and the infrastructure to allow for a temporary increase in seating capacity was postponed to a third phase costing $20–$25 million to be completed by May 1, 2017, pending a commitment by the governments or other parties to fund it and a usage agreement being reached with the Argos. MLSE agreed to pay the city an additional $160,000 annually as long as phase 3 remained uncompleted to compensate the city for the envisioned parking revenues at Argos games. The new proposal was approved by city council on June 12. The official groundbreaking took place on September 23. In April 2015, it was reported that the renovations were $10 million over budget due to pressure to meet deadlines, which MLSE is obligated to fund.

On May 20, 2015, it was announced that two of the three ownership partners of MLSE, Bell Canada and Larry Tanenbaum's Kilmer Group, had acquired an ownership stake in the Argos, with the deal to close at the end of the year, and would move the team to BMO Field for the 2016 season. The new ownership group for the Argos committed $10 million to the conversion costs for BMO Field, with MLSE matching this to fill the $20 million funding gap. Part of the agreement would see two Grey Cups played at the newly renovated BMO Field. The renovations for the Argonauts added a state-of-the-art 10,000 ft^{2} (930 m^{2}) dressing room. In February 2016 it was announced that BMO had extended its naming rights sponsorship agreement for an additional ten years. The renovation ended up costing $150 million in total. At the reopening ceremony it was announced that the province of Ontario had contributed $10 million to the financing. After the renovations, the field for configuration for football has only 18 yard end zones (instead of the standard 20 yards) due to space constraints and the necessity of a safety zone for players beyond the field of play.

In April 2019, MLSE converted the field to a hybrid grass surface.

=== Recent developments ===
In August 2017, Toronto FC II, which hosted their games at the Ontario Soccer Centre their first three seasons, announced that it would move its home games to BMO Field and Lamport Stadium beginning with the 2018 season. However, with their drop to the division 3 USL League One for the 2019 season, the team moved their home games to BMO Training Ground.

BMO Field was selected as a venue to host matches for the 2026 FIFA World Cup. The city of Toronto initially agreed to invest $37 million for updates to the stadium, including the temporary expansion of seating capacity to 45,000. The final plans called for upgrades including a new rooftop patio and lounge, team dugouts, LED videoboards, and sound system, with the city contributing $123 million and MLSE $23 million. The renovations were completed over two phases between the 2024–25 and 2025–26 seasons, with a final cost of $157.9 million, of which $132.9 million was from the city and $25 million from MLSE. The stadium was temporarily renamed Toronto Stadium during the tournament, similar to when the stadium hosted the 2014 FIFA U-20 Women's World Cup and it was temporarily renamed the National Soccer Stadium.

== History ==
=== Soccer ===
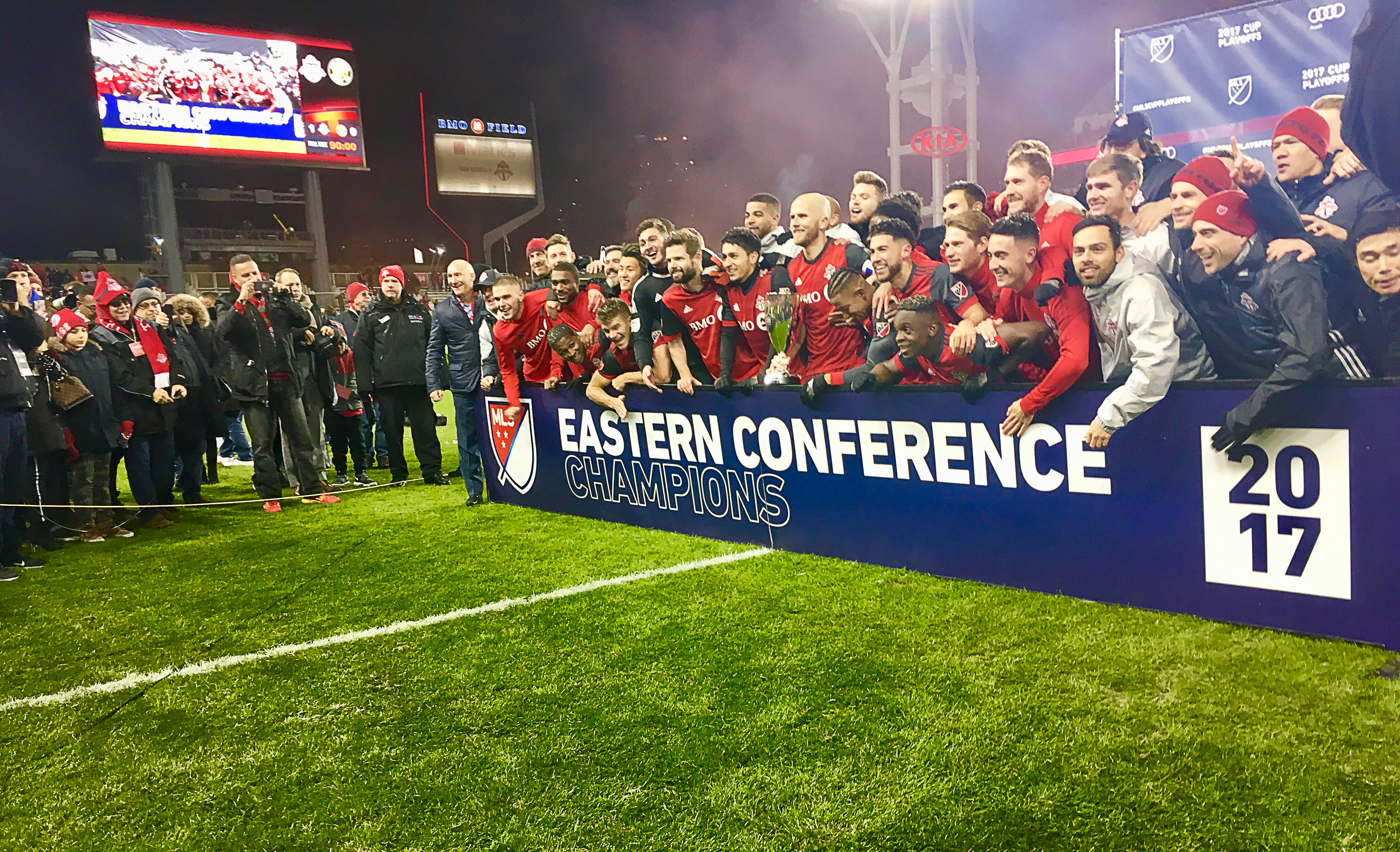
Toronto FC crowned as the MLS' 2017 Eastern Conference champions at BMO Field.

Toronto FC played their first game at BMO Field on April 28, 2007. The grand opening celebration took place on May 12, 2007. On July 18, 2009, BMO Field had its first alcohol suspension, due to an incident that occurred on May 21, 2008, regarding alcohol consumption by a minor.

The 2008 MLS All-Star Game was held at BMO Field on July 24, 2008, versus West Ham United of the English Premier League.

BMO Field has hosted several MLS Cups, as both neutral-site and home team. The 2010 MLS Cup saw it become the first venue outside of the United States to host the event, featuring the Colorado Rapids defeating FC Dallas 2–1. The first TFC home playoff game held at BMO Field saw Toronto defeat the Philadelphia Union 3–1 during the 2016 MLS Cup Playoffs. BMO Field hosted the MLS Cup again in 2016, as Toronto FC won the MLS Eastern Championship and hosted Seattle Sounders FC in the final; Seattle won the match 5–4 on penalties following a goalless draw after extra time. On December 9, 2017, BMO Field hosted its second consecutive MLS Cup, a rematch between Toronto FC and the Seattle Sounders. This time, Toronto FC defeated Seattle 2–0, and became the first MLS team to complete a domestic treble with their win, as well as the first Canadian team to win the MLS Cup.

On July 24, 2014, BMO Field hosted the opening match of the 2014 International Champions Cup between Olympiacos and A.C. Milan; Olympiacos won the match 3–0.

On July 17, 2021, Toronto FC played their first home game at BMO Field since the COVID-19 pandemic, after staying in the United States for the 2020 season and the first half of 2021. They drew 1–1 against Orlando City SC, ironically the team whose stadium they had been using.

On April 19, 2025, AFC Toronto of the Northern Super League played their inaugural match against Montreal Roses FC at BMO Field. Toronto lost 0–1 in front of 14,500 fans. On November 15, 2025, AFC Toronto played in the inaugural Northern Super League final at BMO Field where they lost 1–2 to Vancouver Rise FC in front of 12,429 fans.

==== 2007 FIFA U-20 World Cup ====
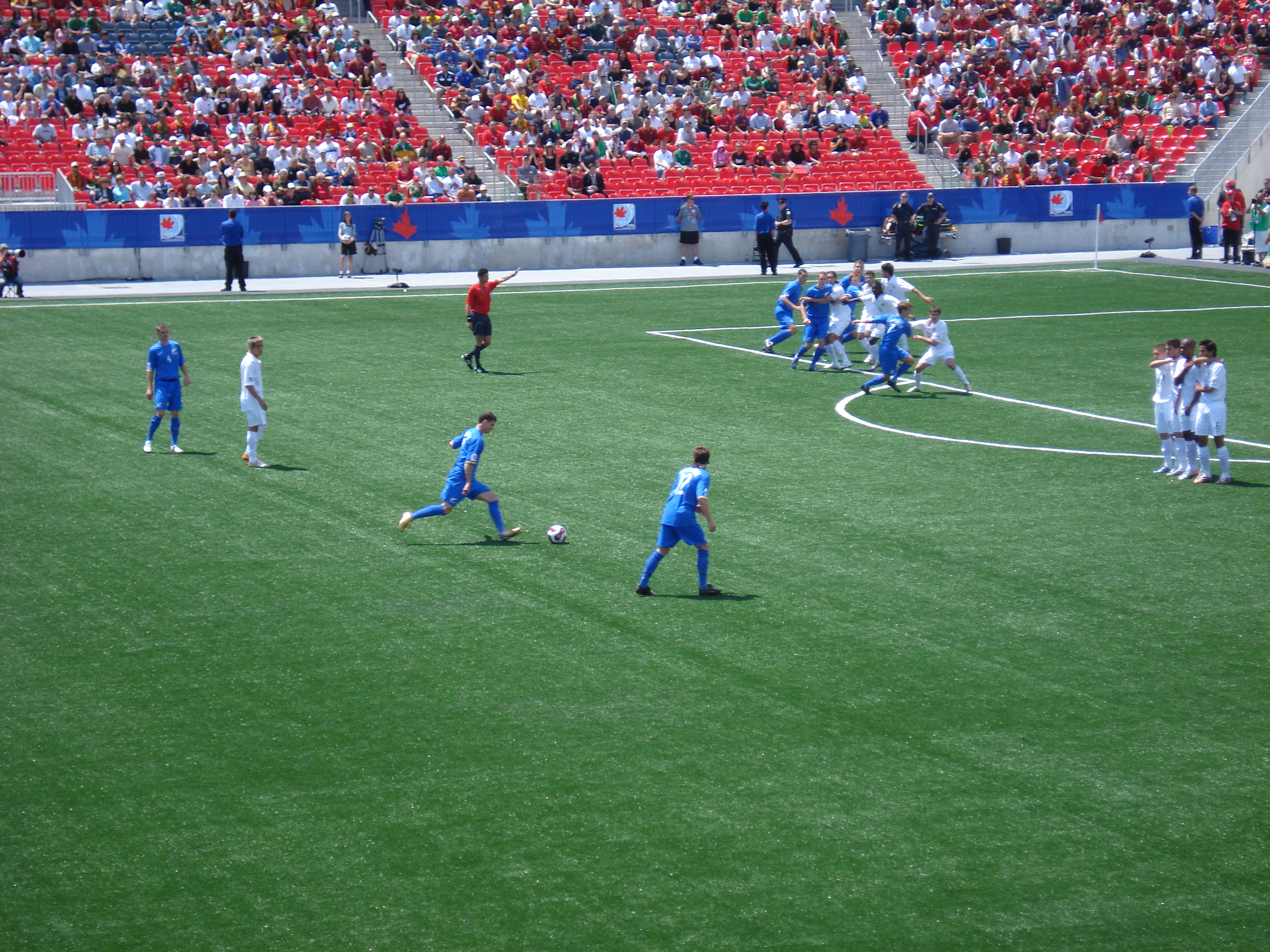
A game between the New Zealand, and Portugal U-20 soccer teams at the 2007 FIFA U-20 World Cup.

BMO Field hosted the 2007 FIFA U-20 World Cup, the first major tournament held at the stadium. The stadium saw the Canadian Under-20 squad once. The stadium also saw six knockout stage games, including the final; which was won by Argentina. Due to FIFA sponsorship regulations, the venue was referred to as the "National Soccer Stadium" during the event.

Date	Home team	Result	Away team	Tournament	Spectators
July 1, 2007	Canada	0–3	Chile	Group A	20,195
July 2, 2007	Portugal	2–0	New Zealand	Group C	19,526
July 2, 2007	Gambia	0–3	Mexico	Group C	19,526
July 5, 2007	New Zealand	0–1	Gambia	Group C	19,526
July 5, 2007	Mexico	2–1	Portugal	Group C	19,526
July 8, 2007	Chile	0–0	Austria	Group A	19,526
July 11, 2007	United States	2–1 (a.e.t.)	Uruguay	Round of 16	19,526
July 12, 2007	Argentina	3–1	Poland	Round of 16	19,526
July 14, 2007	Austria	2–1	United States	Quarter-finals	19,526
July 19, 2007	Chile	0–3	Argentina	Semi-finals	19,526
July 22, 2007	Chile	1–0	Austria	Third place match	19,526
July 22, 2007	Czech Republic	1–2	Argentina	Final	19,526

==== 2014 FIFA U-20 Women's World Cup ====
BMO Field hosted the 2014 FIFA U-20 Women's World Cup. Canada played in Toronto for the first two match days, with Korea DPR, Finland, and Ghana in their group. National Soccer Stadium also hosted a quarterfinal match on August 16.

Date	Home team	Result	Away team	Tournament	Spectators
August 5, 2014	Canada	0–1	Ghana	Group A	20,195
August 5, 2014	Finland	1–2	North Korea	Group A	20,195
August 8, 2014	Canada	3–2	Finland	Group A	20,195
August 8, 2014	Ghana	0–3	North Korea	Group A	20,195
August 13, 2014	South Korea	2–1	Mexico	Group C	20,195
August 13, 2014	Costa Rica	0–3	New Zealand	Group D	20,195
August 16, 2014	North Korea	1–1 (3–1 p)	United States	Quarter-finals	20,195

==== 2015 CONCACAF Gold Cup ====
Date	Home team	Result	Away team	Tournament	Spectators
July 14, 2015	Jamaica	1–0	El Salvador	Group B	16,674
July 14, 2015	Canada	0–0	Costa Rica	Group B	16,674

==== 2018 Campeones Cup ====
Date	Home team	Result	Away team	Spectators
September 19, 2018	(Canada) Toronto FC	1–3	(Mexico) UANL	14,823

==== 2023 CONCACAF Gold Cup ====
Date	Home team	Result	Away team	Tournament	Spectators
June 27, 2023	Canada	2–2	Guadeloupe	Group D	15,301

==== 2026 FIFA World Cup ====
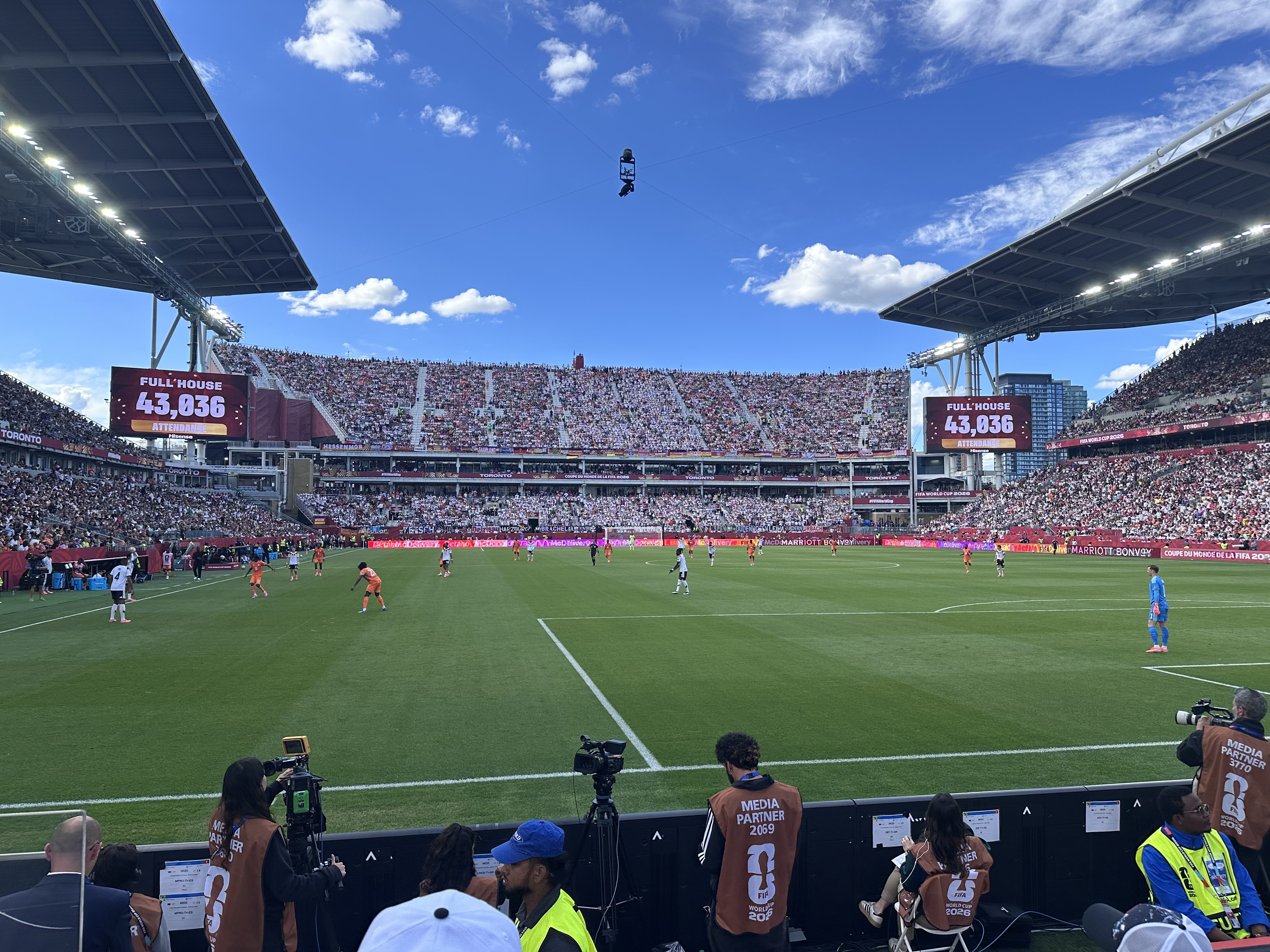
BMO Field during a match between Germany and Côte d'Ivoire at the 2026 FIFA World Cup. The temporary additional seating is visible in the background.

BMO Field hosted matches as part of the 2026 FIFA World Cup, during which it was temporarily renamed to "Toronto Stadium" in accordance with FIFA's policy on corporate-sponsored names. Vancouver was the only other Canadian host city. The field was supplemented by 17,756 temporary seats to bring its capacity to 45,736 for the event, to satisfy a FIFA requirement. On February 4, 2024, it was revealed that the stadium would host the opening match for Canada on June 12, 2026. In total, the stadium hosted six matches, five in the group stage and one in the knockout rounds. It also hosted the Canadian opening ceremony for the tournament.

===== List of matches =====
Date	Team #1	Result	Team #2	Round	Spectators
June 12, 2026	Canada	1–1	Bosnia and Herzegovina	Group B	43,002
June 17, 2026	Ghana	1–0	Panama	Group L	42,942
June 20, 2026	Germany	2–1	Ivory Coast	Group E	43,036
June 23, 2026	Panama	0–1	Croatia	Group L	43,036
June 26, 2026	Senegal	5–0	Iraq	Group I	43,036
July 2, 2026	Portugal	2–1	Croatia	Round of 32	43,036

==== Notable friendlies ====
BMO Field has hosted a number of friendly soccer matches.

Date	Winning Team	Result	Losing Team	Tournament	Spectators
May 23, 2007	(Canada) Toronto FC	0–0	(Portugal) Benfica	Club friendly	18,730
July 25, 2007	(England) Aston Villa	4–2	(Canada) Toronto FC	Club friendly	20,147
August 7, 2009	(Spain) Real Madrid	5–1	(Canada) Toronto FC	Club friendly	22,089
September 2, 2009	(Portugal) Benfica	3–1	(Scotland) Celtic	Club friendly	12,403
May 23, 2010	(Greece) Panathinaikos	0–0	(Portugal) Benfica	Club friendly	10,603
July 22, 2010	(England) Bolton Wanderers	1–1 (4–3 p)	(Canada) Toronto FC	Club friendly	19,507
July 23, 2011	(Portugal) Sporting CP	2–1	(Italy) Juventus	Club friendly	10,028
August 7, 2013	(Italy) Roma	4–1	(Canada) Toronto FC	Club friendly	18,274
July 23, 2014	(England) Tottenham Hotspur	3–2	(Canada) Toronto FC	Club friendly	22,591
July 25, 2014	(Greece) Olympiacos	3–0	(Italy) Milan	2014 International Champions Cup	10,603
May 27, 2015	(England) Manchester City	1–0	(Canada) Toronto FC	Club friendly	23,169
July 18, 2015	(France) Paris Saint-Germain	3–2	(Portugal) Benfica	2015 International Champions Cup	17,843

=== Football ===
==== Canadian ====
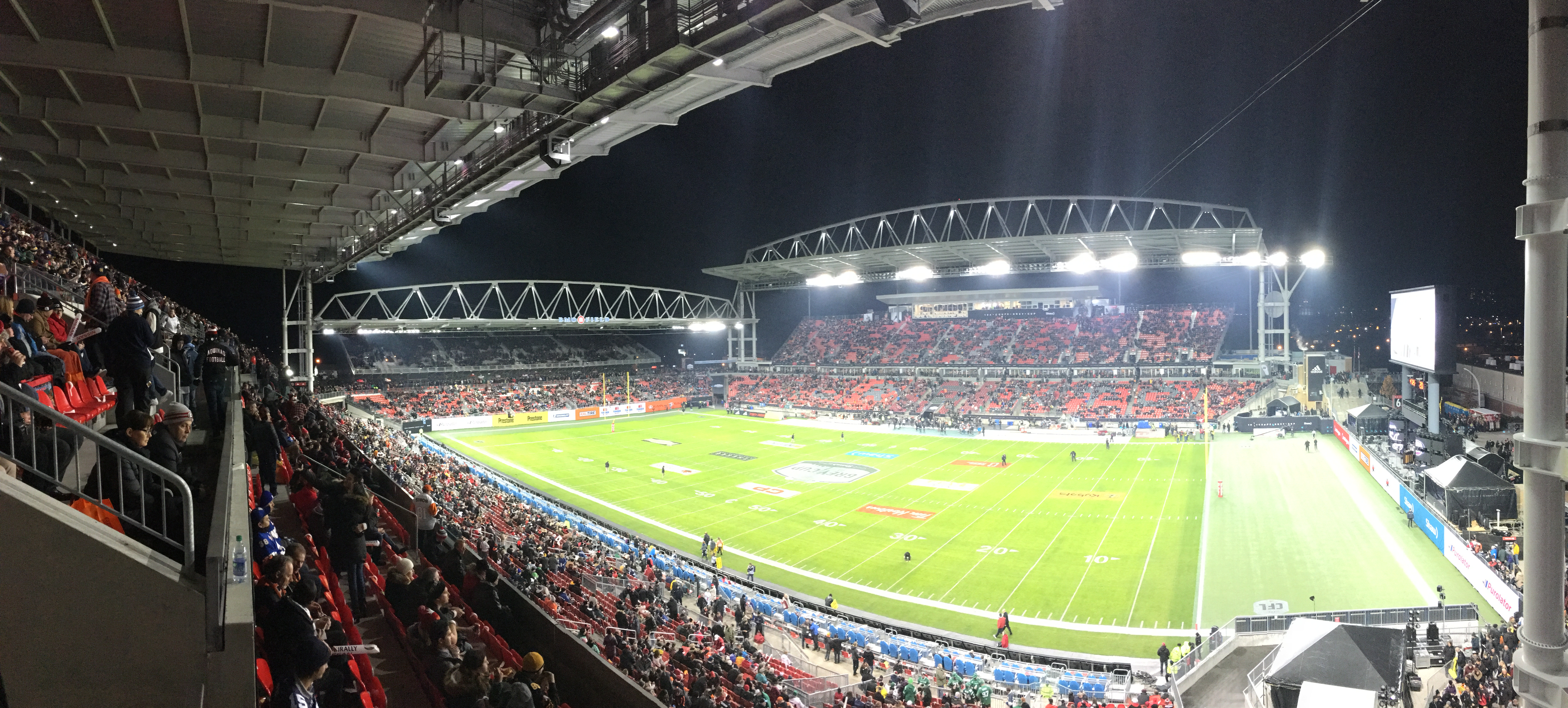
BMO Field set up for Canadian football during the 104th Grey Cup

With the Argonauts moving to the renovated BMO Field beginning with the 2016 CFL season, the venue was, on October 1, 2015, announced as the host for the 104th Grey Cup on November 27, 2016. On June 11, 2016, the Argonauts played their first game at the stadium, a preseason (exhibition) game; the Argos defeated the Hamilton Tiger-Cats 25–16. On June 23, the Argos played their first regular season game at BMO Field, losing 42-20 to the Tiger-Cats..

Due to the position of the stands, each end zone is only 18 yards deep rather than the standard 20 in Canadian football.

==== American ====
In May 2026 it was announced that the Syracuse Orange and the Wake Forest Demon Deacons of the NCAA Division I Atlantic Coast Conference would play their first game of the 2027 season in August at BMO Field.

=== Rugby ===
==== Rugby union ====
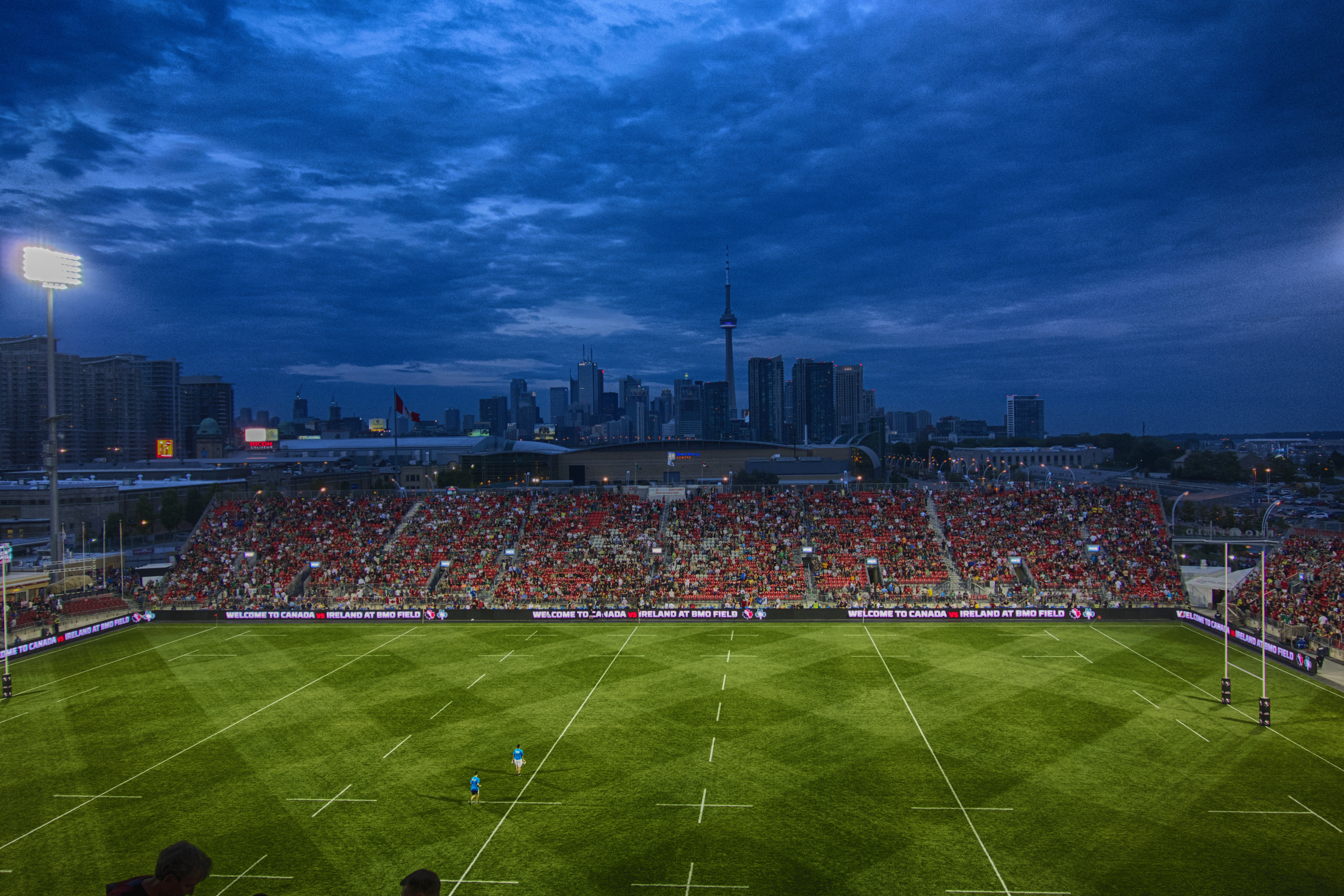
The stadium's pitch set up for a rugby game in June 2013.

BMO Field was a home venue for Canada's national rugby union team. From 2011 to 2016, the team has played at the venue regularly.

During the 2015 Pan American Games, BMO Field hosted the rugby sevens competition (soccer events took place at Tim Hortons Field in Hamilton). Due to PASO sponsorship regulations, the venue was referred to as "Exhibition Stadium" during the event.

Date	Away	Score	Home	Attendance
August 6, 2011	United States	22–28	Canada	10,621
June 15, 2012	Italy	25–16	Canada	12,220
June 15, 2013	Ireland	40–14	Canada	20,396
August 24, 2013	United States	11–13	Canada	10,207
November 3, 2013	Māori All Blacks	40–15	Canada	22,566
June 14, 2014	Scotland	19–17	Canada	18,788
July 29, 2015	Samoa	21–20	Canada	11,200
June 26, 2016	Italy	20–18	Canada	13,125

=== Lacrosse ===
In 2009, the Toronto Nationals of Major League Lacrosse began playing their home games at BMO Field. The team moved to Lamport Stadium for 2010 and to Hamilton in 2011 before folding in 2013.

=== Hockey ===
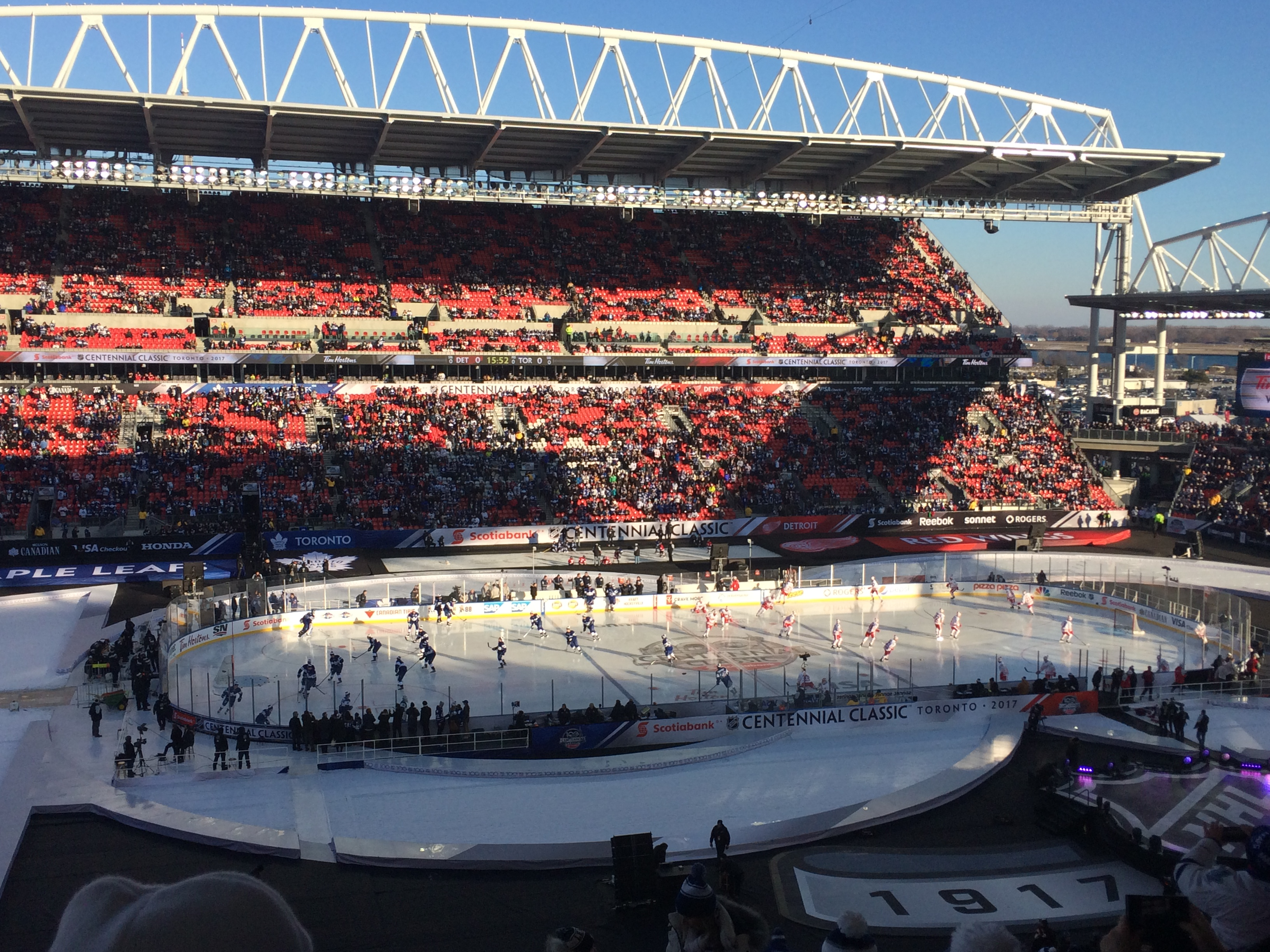
Warm-ups at 2017 NHL Centennial Classic

On January 1, 2017, BMO Field hosted an NHL outdoor game, the NHL Centennial Classic, in honour of the Toronto Maple Leafs' and the NHL's centennial seasons. The Leafs hosted the Detroit Red Wings, in a rematch of the 2014 NHL Winter Classic held three years prior. The venue was referred to as "Exhibition Stadium" for its duration, as Scotiabank (a direct competitor to BMO), was title sponsor of the event.

Date	Away team	Result	Home team	Spectators
December 31, 2016	(United States) Detroit Red Wings Alumni	4–3	(Canada) Toronto Maple Leafs Alumni	–
January 1, 2017	(United States) Detroit Red Wings	4–5 (OT)	(Canada) Toronto Maple Leafs	40,148

=== Concerts ===
The only music concert thus far at BMO Field was performed by the progressive rock group Genesis on September 7, 2007.

=== Milestones ===
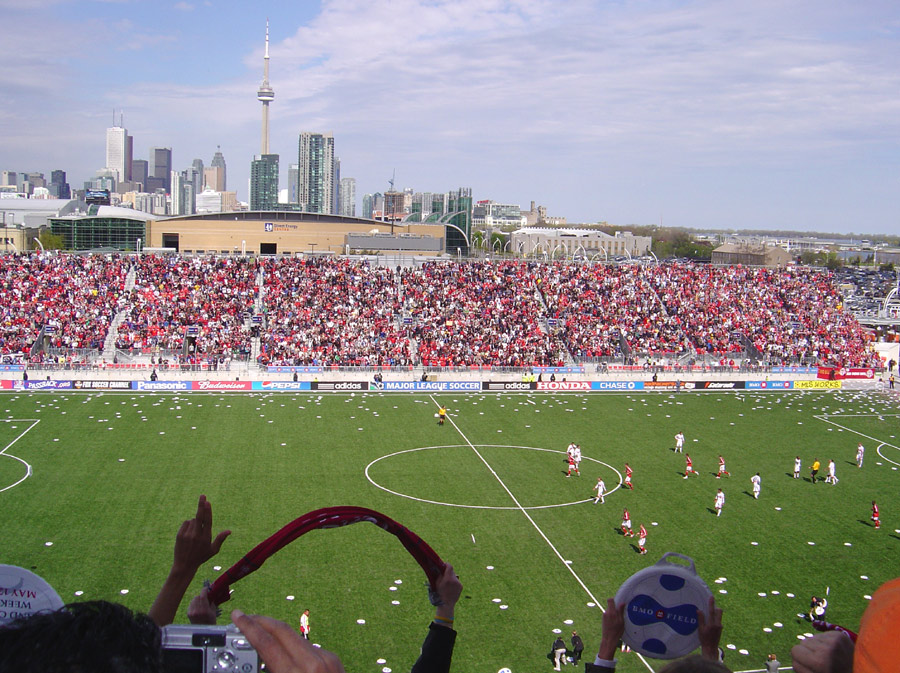
View of the stadium immediately after the Toronto FC scored their first goal in club history on June 12, 2007.

The first goal at BMO Field was scored by Eddie Johnson for the Kansas City Wizards in a 1–0 Major League Soccer win over home side Toronto FC in the stadium opener on April 28, 2007. The first Toronto FC goal at the stadium was Danny Dichio's first-half strike against Chicago Fire on May 12, 2007 (also his club's first MLS goal).

The first goal at BMO Field scored by a Canadian came at the official opening on May 11, 2007, in a U-20 friendly between Canada and Argentina. David Edgar scored a penalty in a 2–1 defeat for Canada, just four minutes after Gómez had scored the first international goal at the stadium.

Costa Rica's Víctor Núñez scored the first senior international goal in a 1–1 friendly draw with hosts Canada on September 12, 2007, shortly before Dwayne De Rosario scored Canada's first senior goal at the stadium.

The first Toronto FC goal scored by a Canadian at BMO Field was in a June 25, 2007 friendly against Aston Villa of the English Premier League. Andrea Lombardo scored an equalizer at BMO Field's south end to make it 2–2 before Aston Villa ran out 4–2 winners. The first league goal at BMO Field scored by a Canadian came when Miguel Cañizalez scored for Toronto FC in the second minute of their 2–1 defeat to the Columbus Crew on September 22, 2007, snapping an 824-minute MLS goalless streak.

The first Toronto FC MLS playoff goal was scored at BMO Field in the 15th minute by Sebastian Giovinco on October 26, 2016, in front of 21,759. In the same game, the first Toronto FC playoff goal scored by a Canadian was by Jonathan Osorio in the 48th minute; the final score was 3–1 over the Philadelphia Union.

In lacrosse, the first Major League Lacrosse goal at BMO Field was scored by Merrick Thomson of the Toronto Nationals in a 15–11 win in their home opener on May 22, 2009.

In Canadian football, the first Canadian Football League points scored at BMO Field was a Toronto Argonauts completed touchdown pass caught by Vidal Hazelton, thrown by Logan Kilgore, in a June 11, 2016 exhibition Argos win; final score 25–16. The first CFL regular season points scored at the stadium was a conceded safety touch of 2 points by Canadian Argos kicker/punter Lirim Hajrullahu in a 20–42 loss on June 23. The first regular season points scored by the Argos at BMO Field was a successful field goal kicked by Hajrullahu in the same game. On July 25, the Argonauts won their first regular season game at their new home, defeating the Montreal Alouettes 30–17.

== Attendance records ==
The largest attendance for any event at the stadium was recorded on May 9, 2026, when Toronto FC hosted Inter Miami CF in front of 44,828 people. This broke the previous record from January 1, 2017, when the Toronto Maple Leafs hosted the Detroit Red Wings in the NHL Centennial Classic in front of 40,148. The largest attendance for a Canadian Football League game was the 104th Grey Cup played before 33,421 on November 27, 2016. For all three games plus MLS Cup 2016—won by the Seattle Sounders over Toronto FC in front of 36,045—the stadium was expanded beyond its permanent capacity.

=== MLS ===
Season	Season average	Highest gate	Lowest gate
2007	20,130	20,522	19,123
2008	20,120	20,461	19,657
2009	20,344	20,902	19,843
2010	20,453	22,108	18,394
2011	20,267	22,453	16,313
2012	18,681	20,071	14,623
2013	17,639	21,700	12,627
2014	22,086	22,591	18,269
2015	23,451	30,226	16,382
2016	26,787	36,045	20,011
2017	27,394	30,584	15,175
2018	26,628	30,799	14,823
2019	25,048	28,989	22,651
2020^{1}	26,171		
2021^{2}	8,422	13,144	5,026
2022	25,423	29,130	20,809
2023	25,310	27,892	20,701
2024	25,681	30,217	21,355
2025	21,353	28,855	14,018

Notes:
^{1}Only one Toronto FC home match in Canada was played with attendance allowed, on March 7, 2020 before the season postponed, condensed, played in closed stadiums, and moved, due to the COVID-19 pandemic.
^{2} Limited capacity for regular season home matches after resuming hosting games at BMO Field in July due to COVID-19 pandemic.

=== CFL ===
Season	Season average	Highest gate	Lowest gate
2016	16,380	33,421^{1}	12,373
2017	13,913	24,929	11,219
2018	14,211	18,104	10,844
2019	12,789	16,734	9,819
2020	Season cancelled due to COVID-19		
2021^{2}	8,603	21,492	6,247
2022	11,999	21,331	9,806
2023	15,984	26,620	12,473
2024	15,420	20,487	10,857
2025	15,109	19,846	12,025

Notes:
^{1} 104th Grey Cup game between the Ottawa Redblacks and Calgary Stampeders.
^{2} Limited capacity for all regular season games due to COVID-19 pandemic.

=== Rugby ===
The largest crowd for rugby at BMO Field and in Canada occurred when the Canada national rugby union team hosted the New Zealand Māori All Blacks before 22,566 people on November 3, 2013. The Maori All Blacks won the match 40–15.

=== Hockey ===
The regular-season NHL Centennial Classic match on New Year's Day 2017 between the Detroit Red Wings and Toronto Maple Leafs drew a then record attendance of 40,148.

== See also ==
- List of Canadian Football League stadiums
- List of Major League Soccer stadiums
- List of soccer stadiums in Canada
- Venues of the 2015 Pan American and Parapan American Games
- Lists of stadiums

== Notes ==
Events and tenants
Preceded by first stadium	Home of Toronto FC; 2007–present	Succeeded by current
Preceded by Stadion Galgenwaard; Utrecht	FIFA U-20 World Cup; Final Venue; 2007	Succeeded by Cairo International Stadium; Cairo
Preceded by first stadium	Home of Toronto Nationals; 2009	Succeeded by Lamport Stadium
Preceded by Rogers Centre	Home of Toronto Argonauts; 2016–present	Succeeded by current
Preceded by Qwest Field	Host of the MLS Cup; 2010	Succeeded by Home Depot Center
Preceded by Investors Group Field	Host of the Grey Cup; 2016	Succeeded by TD Place Stadium
Preceded by Mapfre Stadium	Host of the MLS Cup; 2016	Succeeded by BMO Field
Preceded by BMO Field	Host of the MLS Cup; 2017	Succeeded by Mercedes-Benz Stadium
