= Henk van Dongen =

Henricus Joannes (Henk) van Dongen (May 9, 1936 in Delden – March 7, 2011 Vierhouten) was a Dutch organizational theorist, policy advisor, and University Professor at the Rotterdam School of Management and one of its founders. He is noted for introducing notions of process thinking and social integration into (Dutch) organizational studies and practice.

== Biography ==
Van Dongen studied psychology in Leiden under Jan Hendrik van den Berg. He specialized both in social and clinical psychology. He earned his bachelor's degree in social and clinical psychology at the University of Leiden in 1962. While working at Hoogovens, van Dongen earned his PhD in 1969 from the Catholic University of Tilburg for his dissertation on the social impact of the suggestion box (ideeënbus).

The 1960s was the period of democratization of public and private spheres during which radically new concepts of management were developed and applied. After this business experience in Human Resource and Personnel Management, he moved to the academic world. In 1976 he accepted a position in the Graduate School of Management (Interfaculteit Bedrijfskunde), originally established in Delft as a joint initiative of the schools of economics, law and social sciences of Erasmus University, and the schools of civil, mechanical and maritime engineering and general sciences at the Delft University of Technology.

As professor of social and organizational psychology, van Dongen's main focus was the social implications of technological change. In the late 1970s he conducted a study of the social and cultural consequences of information technology for the Rathenau Commission formed by Prime Minister Den Uyl. During this period he started a lifelong exchange with American academic Abbe Mowshowitz.

He was active not only in academia but advised a range of public and private organizations (especially in the transport, infrastructure, banking and pharmacy sectors), e.g., KLM, Port of Rotterdam, Rabobank, Schiphol Airport, Eli Lilly and Company. In the context of organizational advice and policy analysis, Henk van Dongen played an important role in shaping such organizations as SIOO and NSOB (Dutch School of Public Governance).

Henk van Dongen was married to Fieke van Dongen, and has three daughters and nine grandchildren.

== Work ==
In the Dutch context Henk van Dongen influenced several generations of students and practitioners in the field of management. His insights on interaction, conflict and reality definition were further developed by several of his doctoral students.

=== Qualitative Research ===
The work of van Dongen is characterized by a radical rejection of entity-like concepts or thinking. His process worldview was very much influenced by Norbert Elias, Symbolic Interactionism, French existentialism, and certain postmodern insights. He also worked on philosophical concepts stemming from logic and ethics. The law of inconsistency figured prominently in his thinking (see the work of intuitionists such as Brouwer and Bachelard on the law of excluded middle, and the concept of via negativa in theology).

Moreover, his view on ethics was predicated on the idea that rules or principles of conduct should encourage diversity and support a process of negotiation among contending parties. For this reason he emphasized the need to formulate ethical guidelines in the negative (as statements of the form “you ought not …”), and firmly rejected any form of idolatry, insisting that each individual take responsibility for his or her actions.

Van Dongen introduced the work of Karl Weick into Dutch management circles and emphasized the importance of Qualitative Research.

== Publications ==
Van Dongen authored and co-authored many publications in the field of management. A selection:

- H.J. van Dongen, Sociaal-psychologische variabelen en het inzenden van ideeen (Social psychological variables and the injection of ideas). Leiden. Stenfert Kroese, 1969
- H.J. van Dongen, Technology assessment en sociale rationaliteit (Technology assessment and social rationality). Oratie. Delft: Interuniversitair Instituut Bedrijfskunde, 1979
- H.J. van Dongen, Some notions on Social Integration and Steering. In ’t Veld et al. Autopoiesis and Configuration Theory: New Approaches to Societal Steering. Dordrecht. Kluwer Academic Publishers, 1991
- H.J. van Dongen, The End of Great Narratives on Organizational Theory. In: H. Van Driel (ed.) Ontwikkeling van het bedrijfskundig denken en doen: een Rotterdams perspectief (Development of business thought and action: a Rotterdam perspective), 1993
- H.J. van Dongen, W.A.M. de Laat & A.J.J.A Maas, Een kwestie van verschil:conflicthantering en onderhandeling in een configuratieve integratietheorie (A question of difference: conflict management and negotiation in a configurational integration theory), Delft: Eburon, 1996
