= L'Abbé =

L'Abbé may refer to:

== Toponyms ==
=== Canada ===
- Abbé Huard Lake (French: Lac de l'Abbé Huard), Côte-Nord, Quebec
- Abbé Huard River (French: Rivière de l'Abbé-Huard), tributary of the Romaine River in Côte-Nord, Quebec
- Ruisseau L'Abbé, tributary of the Pikauba River in Lac-Ministuk, Le Fjord-du-Saguenay, Quebec

=== France ===
- Buigny-l'Abbé, in the Somme department
- Camblain-l'Abbé, in the Pas-de-Calais department
- Fontaine-l'Abbé, in the Eure department
- Hesdin-l'Abbé, in the Pas-de-Calais department
- Méricourt-l'Abbé, in the Somme department
- Pont-l'Abbé (Breton: Pont-'n-Abad, "Abbot's bridge"), in the Finistère department
- Pont-l'Abbé-d'Arnoult, in the Charente-Maritime department
- Stade de l'Abbé-Deschamps, a stadium in Auxerre

=== Jersey ===
- Vingtaine du Mont à l'Abbé, one of six vingtaines of the Parish of Saint Helier

== Other uses ==
- L'Abbé C, Georges Bataille's 1950 first published novella
- Abbe (name), including people with the name L'Abbe
