= Abbé Larudan =

Anonymous French writer

Abbé Larudan was an anonymous 18th Century French writer—possibly a clergyman for the Catholic Church, though this is unconfirmed—who is largely known for his Anti-Masonic writing, The Freemasons Crushed.

== The Freemasons Crushed ==
Abbé Larudan is best known for his exposé on Freemasonry called Les Franc-Maçons ecrasés, Suite du livre intitule l'Ordre des Franc-Maçons trahi, traduit du Latin (The Freemasons Crushed, a Continuation of the Book entitled The Order of Freemasons Betrayed), published in Amsterdam in 1746. This book is presented as a sequel or an extended volume to the 1742 exposé on Freemasonry by Abbé Gabriel-Louis Pérau. This book was the principle weapon used by Anti-Masons that came after Abbé Larudan, according to Georg Kloss.

This Masonic exposure is most notable for being the first the posit the theory that Oliver Cromwell created the society of Freemasons for the sole purpose of overthrowing the English monarchy and placing himself at the head of the Commonwealth of England. This theory is founded upon two claims: first, that the ideologies of Freemasonry and Cromwell's political agenda are similar (i.e. liberty and equality for all people); and second, that he gathered this information from an anonymous Grand Master of English Freemasons. According to Abbé Larudan, Cromwell initiated his closest friends—who were dedicated to his mission to free everyone from the tyrannical rule of the monarchs—into this secret society he called the Freemasons, and held them under severe oaths of loyalty, and he received instruction to do this by divine providence. Abbé Larudan delivers the narrative of this origin of Freemasonry in such absurdly minute detail as to warrant suspicion, especially given the almost complete lack of detail provided for the actual rituals and ceremonies of Cromwell's associates into this newly founded secret society.

According to Arthur Edward Waite it was a Catholic attempt to slander Freemasonry by assigning it a Protestant origin.

The theory of the origin of Freemasonry as a cult of Oliver Cromwell has been refuted by most Masonic scholars, and is largely held as being an invention of Abbé Larudan's imagination.

In addition to this Cromwellian theory, Abbé Larudan provides supplements to the exposure of Masonic ritual and catechism, such as the floor drawings. These floor drawings are often called the trestle board or tracing board in Masonic ritual, which later became known as carpets, because they were originally the emblems of Freemasonry that were manually drawn on the floor, and then later imprinted on carpets. Abbé Larudan's trestle boards are unique in that they depict the space of the Lodge room in perspective. But like his theory of Cromwell's invention of Freemasonry, Abbé Larudan's trestle boards are equally contrived from his imagination, as they bear no semblance to any actual trestle boards, either Entered Apprentice, Fellow Craft, or Master Mason designed prior or since this Masonic exposé.

== Impact ==
The Freemasons Crushed had hardly any impact when it was published, even among Anti-Masons. In fact, the whole Cromwellian origin of Masonry would have fallen into total obscurity had it not been revived by Léo Taxil a century and a half after Abbé Larudan. Taxil claims that the "Lord Protector" (i.e. Cromwell) was initiated as a Freemason. This goes along with his infamous libel campaign against Freemasonry and Catholicism, known as the Taxil hoax.

== Identity ==
Who the Abbé Larudan was is somewhat of a mystery. Other than his writings, he is unknown. Jacques Brengues speculated in his La Franc-Maçonnerie du bois (1973) that Abbé Larudan was Abbé Henri Charles Arnauld de Pomponne (1669-1756), because "Larudan" is an anagram for "Arnauld". Other than this conjecture of identity derived from an anagram, there is no serious founding that Abbé Larudan was Abbé Henri Charles Arnauld de Pomponne. Further, Brengues' speculation is the only potential identity of Abbé Larudan that has ever been put forth.
