= Kevin Goldthwaite =

American soccer player

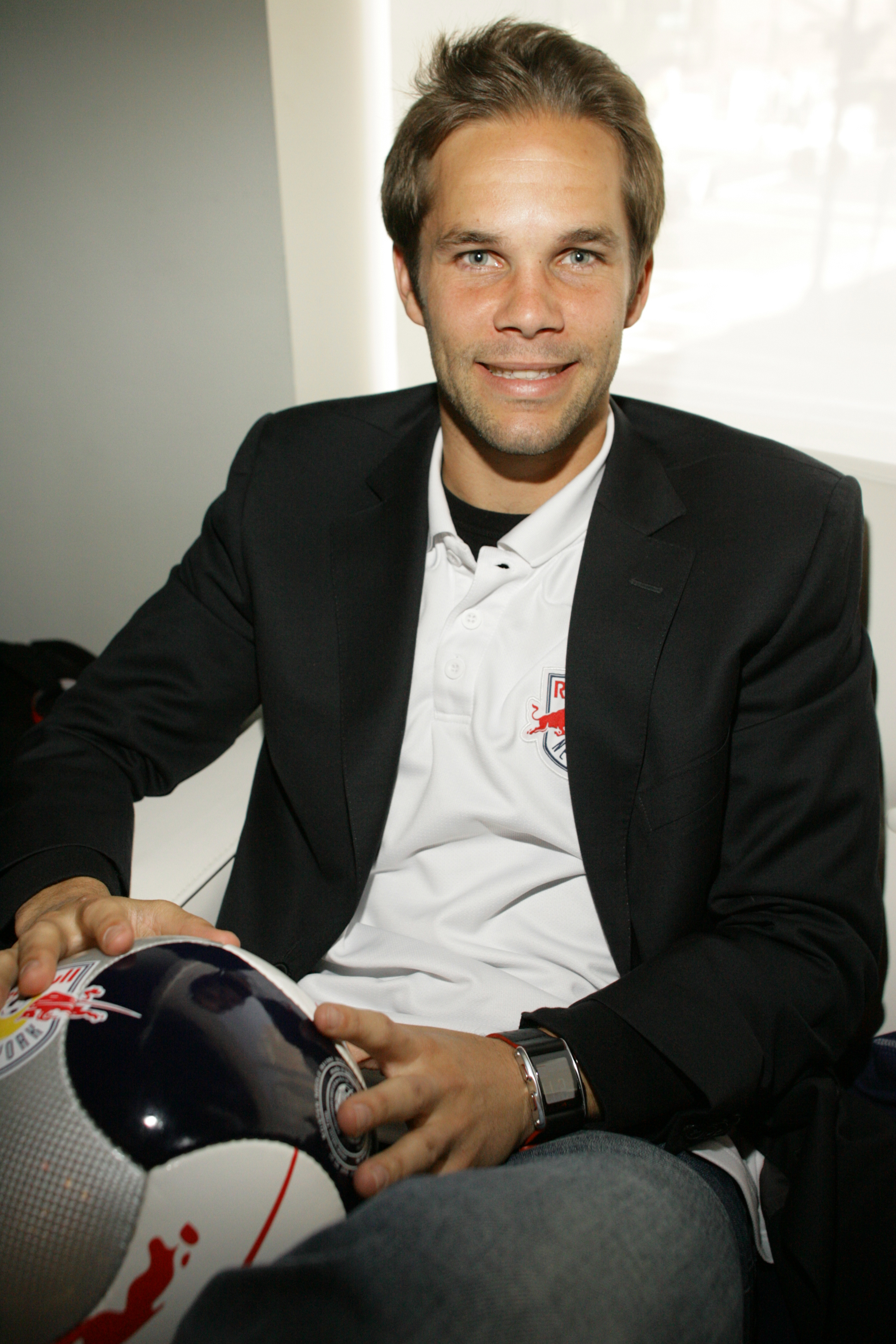

Personal information
- Full name: Kevin Patrick Goldthwaite
- Date of birth: December 9, 1982 (age 43)
- Place of birth: Sacramento, California, United States
- Height: 6 ft 1 in (1.85 m)
- Position: Defender

College career
Years	Team	Apps	(Gls)
2001–2004	Notre Dame Fighting Irish		

Senior career*
Years	Team	Apps	(Gls)
2004	Indiana Invaders	1	(0)
2005	San Jose Earthquakes	3	(0)
2005	→ Portland Timbers (loan)	10	(0)
2006–2007	Houston Dynamo	21	(0)
2007	Toronto FC	9	(1)
2007–2010	New York Red Bulls	54	(2)
2010	Portland Timbers (USL)	1	(0)
2011	Portland Timbers	4	(1)
- * Club domestic league appearances and goals

Kevin Goldthwaite (born December 9, 1982) is a former American soccer player who last played as a defender for Portland Timbers of Major League Soccer.

== Career ==
=== College ===
After graduating from Christian Brothers High School (Sacramento, California), Goldthwaite played college soccer at the University of Notre Dame from 2001 to 2004. He was named second-team all-Big East as a junior in 2003 and first-team all-Big East in 2004. Goldthwaite was also a semifinalist for the Hermann Trophy in 2004. He led the Irish with nine assists in 2003 and also scored two goals in an NCAA tournament game against Milwaukee. He also played for Indiana Invaders in the USL Premier Development League.

=== Professional ===
Goldthwaite was selected 17th overall in the 2005 MLS SuperDraft by the San Jose Earthquakes but was loaned to the Portland Timbers of the USL First Division during his first year. He played in eight reserve matches for San Jose, scoring two goals, and made two U.S. Open Cup appearances for the Earthquakes. He also made 10 regular-season and two post-season appearances with Portland, rejoining San Jose after the Timbers' playoff loss. He played in three regular-season games and one playoff contest for the Earthquakes, earning an assist in his Major League Soccer debut.

Along with the rest of his Earthquakes teammates, Goldthwaite moved to the Houston Dynamo for the 2006 season and saw sporadic time on the back line. On April 18, 2007, he was traded along with a first-round pick in 2008 MLS SuperDraft to Toronto FC for Richard Mulrooney. He scored Toronto's first ever game-winning goal in the match against Chicago Fire on May 12, 2007. He was named a reserve for the 2007 edition of the MLS All-Star game. Goldthwaite was moved to New York Red Bulls in a trade for Todd Dunivant on June 27, 2007. After struggling in 2007 with New York, Goldthwaite emerged as a key player for the Red Bulls in 2008. He started 28 regular season matches, scoring 2 goals and recording 2 assists. His consistency throughout the season earned him the club's Defender of the Year Award. He then helped lead the Red Bulls to an unlikely appearance in the MLS Cup Final, playing in a back line that yielded one goal in three playoff matches. In 2009 Goldthwaite had an injury-riddled season for New York limiting him to 17 league appearances.

Goldthwaite was unable to recover from his injuries during the 2010 season and was waived by New York on August 6, 2010, to make room on the Red Bulls roster for new signing Rafael Márquez. On August 25, 2010, Portland Timbers signed Goldthwaite for the remainder of the 2010 USSF Division-2 Professional League season. Having played for Portland in 2005 while on loan from San Jose Earthquakes, it is his second stint in the Rose City.

On November 28, 2011, Goldthwaite announced his retirement from professional soccer at the age of 28.

== Career statistics ==
https://web.archive.org/web/20080429185627/http://web.mlsnet.com/history/register.jsp?content=players_p

Club performance			League		Cup		League Cup		Continental		Total	
Season	Club	League	Apps	Goals	Apps	Goals	Apps	Goals	Apps	Goals	Apps	Goals
USA			League		Open Cup		League Cup		North America		Total	
2005	Portland Timbers	USL First Division	10	0	-	-	2	0	-	-	12	0
2005	San Jose Earthquakes	Major League Soccer	3	0	2	0	1	0	-	-	6	0
2006	Houston Dynamo	Major League Soccer	20	0	2	0	-	-	-	-	22	0
2007	Houston Dynamo	Major League Soccer	1	0	-	-	-	-	1	0	2	0
2007	Toronto FC	Major League Soccer	9	1	-	-	-	-	-	-	9	1
2007	New York Red Bulls	Major League Soccer	9	0	-	-	-	-	-	-	9	0
2008	New York Red Bulls	Major League Soccer	28	2	1	0	4	0	-	-	33	2
2009	New York Red Bulls	Major League Soccer	17	0	1	0	-	-	1	0	19	0
2010	Portland Timbers	D-2 Pro League	1	0	-	-	2	0	-	-	3	0
2011	Portland Timbers	Major League Soccer	4	1	1	0	-	-	-	-	5	1
Total	USA		102	4	7	0	9	0	2	0	120	4
Career total			98	3	6	0	9	0	2	0	115	3

== Honors ==
=== Houston Dynamo ===
- Major League Soccer MLS Cup (1): 2006

=== New York Red Bulls ===
- Major League Soccer Western Conference Championship (1): 2008
