= Abbe Borg =

Swedish professional gamer

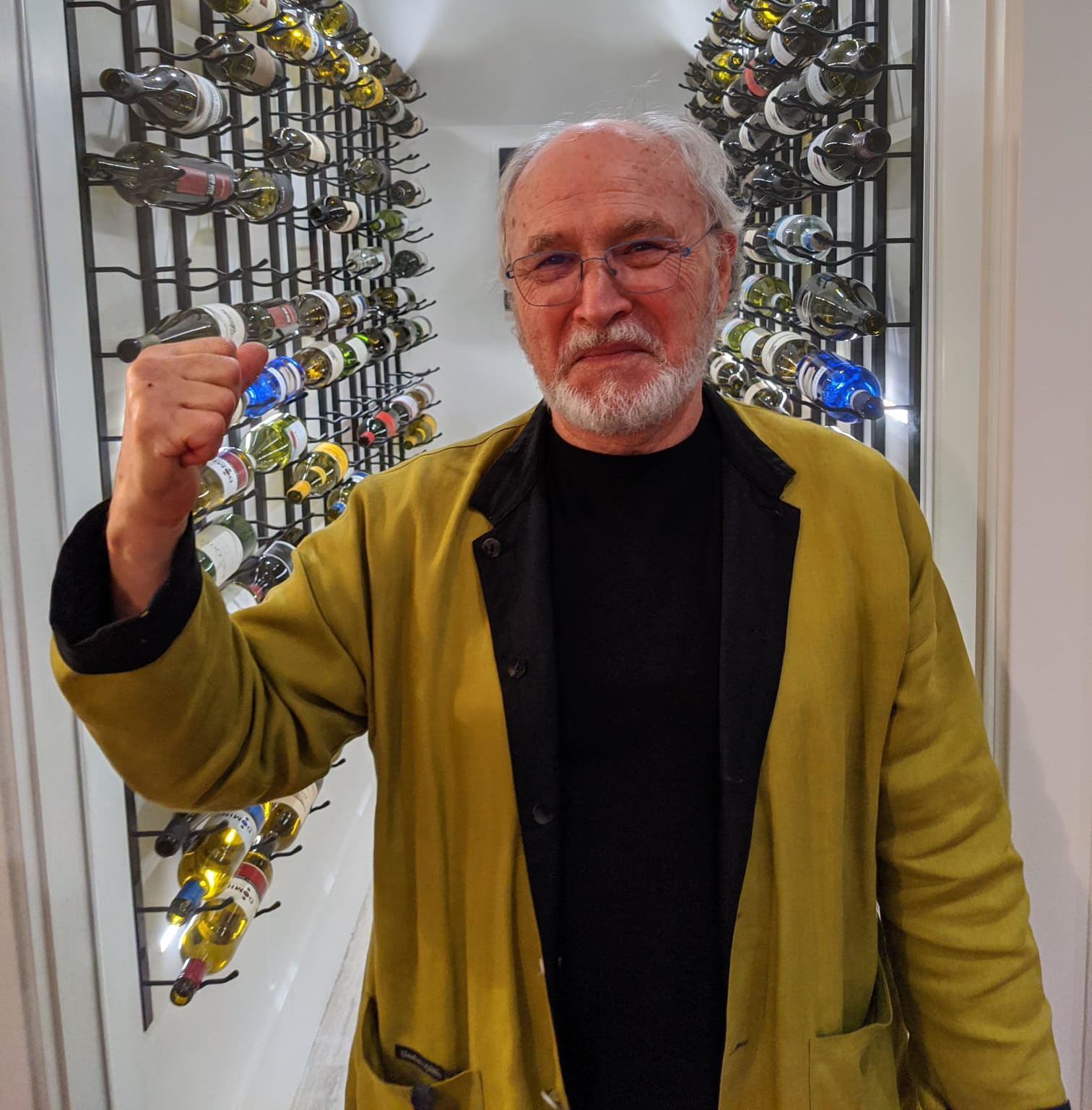
- Born: 11 February 1943 (age 82); Stockholm, Sweden
- Occupation: Chief gaming officer at Original Gamer Life
- Height: 1.67 m (5 ft 5 in)

Abbe Borg (born 11 February 1943), known online as DieHardBirdie, or Abbe Drakborg, is a Swedish gamer who is considered the ‘world’s oldest esports champion’. He lives in Stockholm, Sweden.

== Biography ==
Abbe Borg was born on 11 February 1943, in Stockholm. He worked as a professional metal and paper sculpture artist for 40 years in Sweden. In 2017, he started gaming, playing the multiplayer, first-person shooter game Counter-Strike: Global Offensive (CS:GO) and joined the Silver Snipers team, which came together when several elderly Swedish people with an interest in esports responded to an advert about joining a senior CS:GO team with the dream of competing at the DreamHack Summer 2018 gaming festival.

Started under the tutelage of retired professional Swedish Counterstrike player Tommy Potti Ingemarsson, the Silver Snipers team failed to win the championship title in the seniors CS:GO tournament at DreamHack Summer 2018 but took the title in the seniors tournament at DreamHack Summer 2019 and Borg became a world champion at 78 years old. He was the team's oldest member and called himself the oldest CS:GO player in the world. Borg, who along with other Silver Snipers members has appeared in documentaries, talk shows and on gaming fan sites, earned his nickname DieHardBirdie due to the bird-mimicking whistling sounds he makes when he takes aim in a game.
