= Rhum Vieux Labbé =

Brand of Haitian rum

- Type: Rum
- Manufacturer: Berling S.A.
- Origin: Port-au-Prince, Haiti
- Introduced: 1765
- Alcohol by volume: 43.0%
- Website: berlingsa.com

Vieux Labbé is a rum produced and bottled in Haiti by Berling S.A. in Port-au-Prince.

== History ==
Rhum Vieux Labbé is produced by the Linge family, descendants of Labbé Barbancourt, who was the brother of the renowned Dupré Barbancourt, founder of the Barbancourt rum legacy. The company was started in 1903, he soon began selling it for HTG 1.50 (USD $0.30) per gallon. His granddaughter Jeanne Barbancourt married a German fragrance specialist, Mr. Berling. He gave his name to the company Berling SA that makes the Rhum Vieux Labbé.

== Description ==
Vieux Labbé is a rum produced and bottled in Haiti by Berling S.A. in Port-au-Prince. The company Berling SA is owned by Herbert Linge. Vieux Labbé is aged in oak barrels in the traditional Haitian-style of Cognac distillation that originated in France.

== Products ==
- Rhum Vieux Labbé 3-Star (aged 3 years)
- Rhum Vieux Labbé 5-Star (aged 7 years)
- Rhum Vieux Labbé Edition Speciale (aged 8 years)
- Rhum Vieux Labbé 10 years

== Awards ==
- 2007: Winner of the inaugural Drinks International Rum Challenge for rum over 7 years old.
- 2008: Superior Taste Award by the International Taste and Quality Institute (iTQi)

== See also ==
- Rhum Barbancourt
- Rhum agricole
