= Bastián Labbé =

Chilean constituent

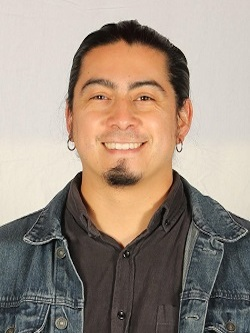
- Photograph of Labbé

Member of the Constitutional Convention
- In office 4 July 2021 – 4 July 2022
- Constituency: 20th District

Personal details
- Born: 6 May 1990 (age 36) Hualpén, Chile
- Education: University of Concepción (BA)
- Occupation: Constituent
- Profession: Teacher of History

Bastián Labbé Salazar (born 6 May 1990) is a Chilean history and geography teacher, socio-environmental activist, and independent politician.

He served as a member of the Constitutional Convention, representing the 20th District of the Biobío Region, and acted as coordinator of the Popular Participation Commission.

== Biography ==
Labbé was born on 6 May 1990 in Presidente Ríos, Chile. He is the son of David Labbé Bustamante and Cecilia Salazar Vejar.

He completed his primary and secondary education at Pedro del Río Zañartu High School and La Asunción High School in the commune of Talcahuano, graduating in 2007. In 2008, he entered the History and Geography program at the University of Concepción, where he earned a degree in Education and qualified as a History and Geography teacher in 2013.

He later completed an International Diploma in Environmental Education and Sustainable Educational Projects through the NGO Fondo Verde.

Between 2014 and 2018, he worked as a History and Geography and instrumental training teacher at Comunidad Vínculos. From 2018 to 2019, he served as Environmental Seal Coordinator at Colegio Calbuco. In 2019, he was a lecturer in the PACE Program at the Universidad Católica de la Santísima Concepción. From 2019 until April 2021, he worked as a pedagogical advisor for the EXPLORA project “Huellas en el Biobío”, under the Ministry of Science, Technology, Knowledge and Innovation.

== Political career ==
In the public sphere, Labbé has stood out as an environmental activist and educator. He has served as spokesperson for the environmental organization Salvemos el Santuario, which seeks the protection of the Hualpén Peninsula Nature Sanctuary. He also participates in the Wallpen Territorial Coordination and is a co-founder of the NGO Colectivo El Queule, an initiative focused on promoting ecotourism, environmental education, and research.

In the elections held on 15 and 16 May 2021, he ran as an independent candidate for the Constitutional Convention representing the 20th District of the Biobío Region, as part of the Asamblea Popular Constituyente list. He obtained 9,597 votes, corresponding to 3.14% of the valid votes cast.
