= Matthieu Labbé =

French footballer (born 1985)

Personal information
- Date of birth: 25 January 1985 (age 41)
- Place of birth: Boulogne-sur-Mer, France
- Height: 1.82 m (6 ft 0 in)
- Position: Midfielder

Team information
- Current team: USL Dunkerque

Youth career
- US Boulogne

Senior career*
Years	Team	Apps	(Gls)
2003–2009	US Boulogne	81	(1)
2009–	USL Dunkerque		
- * Club domestic league appearances and goals as of 19:04, 23 November 2009 (UTC)

Matthieu Labbé (born 26 January 1985) is a French football midfielder. Currently, he plays in the Championnat de France amateur for USL Dunkerque.
