= Deborah Mowshowitz =

American biochemist

- Mowshowitz giving a lecture on metabolism
- Education: Brandeis University; Albert Einstein College of Medicine
- Children: 2, including Zvi Mowshowitz
- Awards: Presidential Outstanding Teaching Award
- Scientific career
- Fields: Biochemistry
- Workplaces: Columbia University
- Doctoral advisor: James E. Darnell

Deborah Mowshowitz (née Bernhardt) is an American biochemist and a Professor of Biology and Director of Undergraduate Programs and Lab Operations at Columbia University. Mowshowitz was trained in pure biochemistry and has done research in RNA processing. In her early work she focused on pedagogy and biology education.

== Education ==
Mowshowitz was awarded a BA from Brandeis University and entered the Sue Golding Graduate Division of the Albert Einstein College of Medicine. At Albert Einstein, Mowshowitz studied biochemistry under James E. Darnell and received her PhD in 1969 for a thesis entitled "tRNA synthesis in HeLa cells".

== Research ==
Mowshowitz was Darnell's first graduate student at the Albert Einstein College of Medicine. As Darnell's student, Mowshowitz worked on RNA processing; up until that point, it had been thought that preprocessing was limited to pre-rRNA, but Mowshowitz demonstrated the existence of pre-tRNAs as well. Mowshowitz used gel electrophoresis to separate smaller, slower-migrating pre-tRNA candidate particles which had been labeled with radioactive uridine. She observed the pre-tRNAs under methionine-starvation conditions and proposed that the pre-tRNAs were longer than tRNAs proper. Early work by Mowshowitz focused on pure biochemistry, in areas such as enzyme assays and biosynthesis in yeast. She has also published in the Journal of Virology and in Analytical Biochemistry.

== Teaching ==
Mowshowitz joined the faculty at Columbia when Darnell, her thesis adviser at AECOM, was appointed to a professorship at Columbia and informed her of an open faculty position. While Mowshowitz is trained in research, she decided to focus on teaching after joining the Columbia faculty, and sought to focus on the areas of pedagogy and biology education in particular. Mowshowitz personally controls the introductory biology sequence at Columbia, and lectures on occasion. She also oversees the biology department at Columbia as Director of Undergraduate Programs and Lab Operations.

Mowshowitz believes in a problem-based learning approach to teaching biology, emphasizing applying deeper principles over rote memorization of pathways and structures. She has stated that she assigns students advanced problems based on famous historical experiments in her introductory classes in order to encourage them to synthesize knowledge to solve problems; she has stated that some of her exam problems ask students to make the critical deductions in experiments which earned their original authors the Nobel Prize.

Her introductory biology course is available as massive open online course. She received the Presidential Outstanding Teaching Award in 1999.

== Selected publications ==
- Mowshowitz, D.; Filner, B. (1979). "Teaching students to read the literature". Biochemical Education. 7 (1): 4–5. doi:10.1016/0307-4412(79)90004-9.
- Mowshowitz, D (2006). "Advanced Problems in Introductory Courses: Some Sample Problems and Why they Work". Biochemistry and Molecular Biology Education. 34 (2): 134–138. doi:10.1002/bmb.2006.49403402134. PMID 21638657.
- Mowshowitz, Deborah Bernhardt (1976). "Permeabilization of yeast for enzyme assays: An extremely simple method for small samples". Analytical Biochemistry. 70 (1): 94–99. doi:10.1016/s0003-2697(76)80051-6. PMID 769602.
- Mowshowitz, D (1973). "Identification of Polysomal RNA in BHK Cells Infected by Sindbis Virus". Journal of Virology. 11 (4): 535–543. doi:10.1128/JVI.11.4.535-543.1973. PMC 355135. PMID 4633684.
