= Maycoll Cañizalez =

Canadian soccer player

Personal information
- Full name: Maycoll Cañizalez-Smith
- Date of birth: 28 December 1982 (age 43)
- Place of birth: Quezaltepeque, El Salvador
- Height: 1.75 m (5 ft 9 in)
- Position: Attacking midfielder

Youth career
- 2001: Toronto Lynx

Senior career*
Years	Team	Apps	(Gls)
2001–2004	Werder Bremen II	47	(2)
2004–2006	Hannover 96 II	20	(1)
2006–2007	FC Oberneuland	15	(1)
2007	Toronto FC	12	(1)
2007–2010	Bonner SC	77	(2)
2011–2012	Fortuna Köln	35	(1)
2012–2013	SV Roßbach/Verscheid	31	(3)
2013–2016	VfB Oldenburg	87	(0)
2016–2018	SSV Jeddeloh	41	(2)
Total		365	(13)

International career
1998	Canada U17	3	(0)
1999–2001	Canada U20	14	(2)
2002–2003	Canada U23	4	(1)
2003	Canada	5	(1)
- * Club domestic league appearances and goals

Maycoll Cañizalez-Smith (born 28 December 1982) is a Canadian former professional soccer player who played as an attacking midfielder.

== Club career ==
Cañizalez was born in Quezaltepeque, El Salvador and raised in Toronto, Ontario.

He played in Germany for Werder Bremen and Hannover 96 reserve sides before signing with Toronto FC in April 2007. Cañizalez became the first Canadian to score a league goal at BMO Field, getting off the mark against Columbus Crew on 22 September 2007. Toronto waived him at the end of the 2007 season.

Following his time in Toronto, Cañizales returned to Germany, having successful seasons earning playing time at Bonner SC, Fortuna Köln, SV Roßbach/Verscheid and VfB Oldenburg.

== International career ==
Cañizalez played at the 2001 FIFA World Youth Championship in Argentina, alongside Atiba Hutchinson and Mike Klukowski among others.

He made his senior debut for Canada in a January 2003 friendly match against the United States. He earned a total of five caps, scoring one goal. His final international was a July 2003 Gold Cup match against Cuba.

== Career statistics ==
=== Club ===
Appearances and goals by club, season and competition
Club	Season	League			Cup		Total	
Club	Season	Division	Apps	Goals	Apps	Goals	Apps	Goals
Werder Bremen II	2001–02	Regionalliga Nord	26	0	2	0	28	0
Werder Bremen II	2002–03	Regionalliga Nord	15	2	—		15	2
Werder Bremen II	2003–04	Regionalliga Nord	6	0	—		6	0
Werder Bremen II	Total		47	2	2	0	49	2
Hannover 96 II	2004–05	Oberliga Nord	14	1	—		14	1
Hannover 96 II	2005–06	Oberliga Nord	6	1	—		6	1
Hannover 96 II	Total		20	1	0	0	20	1
FC Oberneuland	2006–07	Oberliga Nord	15	1	—		15	1
Toronto FC	2007	MLS	12	1	—		12	1
Bonner SC	2007–08	Oberliga Nordrhein	15	2	—		15	2
Bonner SC	2008–09	NRW-Liga	35	0	—		35	0
Bonner SC	2009–10	Regionalliga West	27	0	—		27	0
Bonner SC	Total		77	2	0	0	77	2
Fortuna Köln	2010–11	NRW-Liga	33	1	—		33	1
Fortuna Köln	2011–12	Regionalliga West	2	0	—		2	0
Fortuna Köln	Total		35	1	0	0	35	1
SV Roßbach/Verscheid	2012–2013	Oberliga Rheinland-Pfalz/Saar	31	3	1	0	32	3
VfB Oldenburg	2013–2014	Regionalliga Nord	32	0	0	0	32	0
VfB Oldenburg	2014–2015	Regionalliga Nord	30	0	0	0	30	0
VfB Oldenburg	2015–2016	Regionalliga Nord	25	0	0	0	25	0
VfB Oldenburg	Total		87	0	0	0	87	0
SSV Jeddeloh	2017–18	Regionalliga Nord	21	2	0	0	21	2
SSV Jeddeloh	2018–19	Regionalliga Nord	20	0	0	0	20	0
SSV Jeddeloh	Total		41	2	0	0	41	2
Career total			365	14	3	0	368	14

=== International ===
Scores and results list Canada's goal tally first, score column indicates score after each Cañizalez goal.

List of international goals scored by Maycoll Cañizalez
No.	Date	Venue	Opponent	Score	Result	Competition
1	12 February 2003	June 11 Stadium, Tripoli, Libya	Libya	4–2	4–2	Friendly match
