= Andrea Lombardo =

Italian-Canadian soccer player (born 1987)

Personal information
- Full name: Andrea Daniele Lombardo
- Date of birth: May 23, 1987 (age 39)
- Place of birth: North York, Ontario, Canada
- Height: 6 ft 1 in (1.85 m)
- Position: Striker

Youth career
- Woodbridge SC
- 2002: Manchester City
- North York Hearts
- 2004–2005: Atalanta

College career
Years	Team	Apps	(Gls)
2008–2010	York Lions		

Senior career*
Years	Team	Apps	(Gls)
2005–2006	Atalanta	1	(0)
2005	→ Perugia (loan)	3	(0)
2006	→ Rieti (loan)	7	(0)
2007–2008	Toronto FC	17	(0)
2010–2012	Portugal FC/SC Toronto	41	(14)
2014–2017	Vaughan Azzurri	?	(?)

International career
2003	Canada U17	10	(0)
2005–2007	Canada U20	21	(3)
2008	Canada U23	3	(0)

Managerial career
- 2017–2018: York Lions (assistant)
- 2018: Vaughan Azzurri (assistant)
- * Club domestic league appearances and goals as of 7 October 2017

Andrea Daniele Lombardo (born May 23, 1987) is a Canadian former soccer player.

== Youth career ==
Lombardo began his youth career playing for Woodbridge Strikers and North York Hearts. He then went on trials with Coventry City, Manchester City, and Modena being offered places in Manchester City and Modena's Academy at the age of 15. He joined Manchester City and trained with them for four months until his work permit was denied. Through a connection from a friend of his father, he was offered a two-day trial with Atalanta. After scoring two goals in a scrimmage, he was offered a contract and joined the club's academy.

== Club career ==
Lombardo began his professional career with Atalanta in 2004. In 2005 and 2006, he was loaned to Perugia and to Rieti.

He joined Toronto FC in their inaugural season of Major League Soccer in 2007. He scored his first goal in an exhibition match against English Premier League club Aston Villa F.C. He played two seasons with the club before being released.

== University career ==
After departing TFC, Lombardo went on to play 4 games for the York University soccer men's team. However, he was found to be violation of Ontario University Athletics rules because he did not maintain amateur status, having played professionally within the past year. All 4 games were overturned. He re-joined the Lions for the 2009/2010 CIS season. He became an assistant coach with York in 2017.

== Semi-pro career ==
On 28 April 2010 he signed a one-year contract for Canadian Soccer League club SC Toronto/Portugal FC which was later extended for the 2012 season. He made his debut for the club on May 8, 2010, in a match against TFC Academy. The following week he would score his first goal for the club on May 16, 2010, against Brantford Galaxy. He helped Portugal FC finish fifth in the overall standings and as a result qualified for a postseason berth. He featured in the quarterfinal match against Milltown FC, and scored a goal which resulted in a 2–2 draw. In the semi-finals Lombardo recorded his second playoff goal in a 5–3 loss to Brantford Galaxy. In the 2011 season he helped SC Toronto capture the Regular Season Championship, but were eliminated in the quarterfinals after their opponents the York Region Shooters won the penalty shootout by a score of 4–2.

After playing with SC Toronto, he decided to retire. He later came out of retirement to play for Vaughan Azzurri in the newly formed League1 Ontario, making his debut against TFC Academy. He took up an assistant coaching role with the same team as well as the youth teams in 2018.

== International career ==
Lombardo started playing for the Canadian youth national team at the age of 14. Lombardo has played for the Canadian under-20 national side. He was part of the squad in the 2005 FIFA World Youth Championship and the 2007 FIFA U-20 World Cup.
