= Abbe Mowshowitz =

American computer scientist

Abbe Mowshowitz (born 13 November 1939, Liberty, New York) is an American academic, a professor of computer science at the City College of New York and a member of the Doctoral Faculty in Computer Science at The City University of New York who works in the areas of the organization, management, and economics of information systems; social and policy implications of information technology; network science; and graph theory. He is known for his work on virtual organization, a concept he introduced in the 1970s on information commodities, on the social implications of computing and on the complexity of graphs and networks.

Before joining the faculty at The City College of New York, Mowshowitz was a faculty member at the University of Toronto (Departments of Computer Science and Industrial Engineering, 1968–1969); the University of British Columbia (Department of Computer Science, 1969–1980); and was research director in the Department of Science and Technology Studies at Rensselaer Polytechnic Institute (1982–1984). In addition, he was a visiting professor at the Graduate School of Management, Delft, The Netherlands (1979–1980); held the Tinbergen Chair in the Graduate School of Management at Erasmus University, Rotterdam, The Netherlands (1990–1991); was a professor in the Department of Social Science Informatics at the University of Amsterdam, The Netherlands (1991–1993, 1994–1997); and was the CeTim professor of Technology Innovation Management at the Rotterdam School of Management, Rotterdam, The Netherlands (2001–2002).

Mowshowitz received a Ph.D. in computer science from the University of Michigan in 1967 (under the direction of Professor Anatol Rapoport), and a BS in Mathematics from the University of Chicago in 1961.

His research on the structural complexity of graphs (published in 1968) was based on a paper by Professor Nicolas Rashevsky, who first introduced the idea of measuring the information content of a graph using Shannon's entropy measure. Mowshowitz formalized and extended Rashevsky's idea and characterized the structural complexity of various classes of graphs and binary operations on graphs. Two measures of structural complexity were defined, both relative to a partition of the vertices of a graph. One of the measures, based on a partition related to independent sets, stimulated Körner's development of graph entropy.

Mowshowitz was an early and persistent advocate of and contributor to studies of the social relations of computing. He introduced an undergraduate course on that topic at the University of British Columbia in 1973; published a comprehensive text in 1976; served as vice-chairman (1983–1985) and chairman (1985–1987) of the ACM's Special Interest Group on Computers and Society; and was a member of IFIP Working Group 9.2 (Computers and Social Accountability) from 1977 to 1997. As the title of his book The Conquest of Will suggests, Mowshowitz aimed to extend the idea of conquest of the material world – theme of many inquiries into the implications of technology – to the realm of behavior and culture. He called attention to the threats posed by computer technology to personal privacy, political freedom and human identity, and, like Professor Joseph Weizenbaum in Computer Power and Human Reason (published in the same year), he pointed to the danger of excessive reliance on computers in areas traditionally requiring human judgment. As an extension of the last chapter of The Conquest of Will he produced a study-anthology of computers in fiction in an effort to stimulate further discussion of the social consequences of computer technology. In recent years he has (together with colleague Professor Akira Kawaguchi) developed and applied a quantitative measure of the bias of search engines on the World Wide Web.

He also worked on the ethical implications of computing and, as a participant in a workshop held at SRI International in 1977 (organized by Mr. Donn Parker), developed a taxonomy of ethical issues that informed the later discussion leading to the ACM code of ethics adopted in 1992. As well as conducting research on ethical implications, he contributed to policy discussions surrounding computer technology. In 1979 he consulted (together with Rob Kling) for the Rathenau Commission of the Dutch Ministry of Science Policy on the societal implications of microelectronics, and from 1980 until it closed in 1995, he consulted regularly for the U.S. Congressional Office of Technology Assessment, producing a variety of background reports on the social impact of information technology.

His conceived the idea of virtual organization in the late 1970s, drawing on an analogy between the structure and function of global companies, on the one hand, and virtual memory in computer systems, on the other. This analogy led eventually to the formal definition presented in a paper that appeared in 1994 and elaborated in his book on virtual organization published in 2002. During the year 1979-1980, he was stimulated to develop and codify the idea of virtual organization through discussions with Henk van Dongen and his colleagues at the Graduate School of Management in Delft, The Netherlands. In the course of elaborating the concept and its implications for society, he introduced the notion of information commodity to explain a key part of the economic foundation of virtual organization and developed mathematical models for pricing information commodities, both from the supply and the demand perspective.

His work in network science combined an interest in the complexity of graphs and networks with practical experience in designing networks to support administrative functions. While at the University of Amsterdam, the Netherlands in the 1990s, he worked on the design and development of a network to support information sharing on drug related issues among member states of the European Union. This work contributed to the formation of the European Monitoring Centre for Drugs and Drug Addiction which was eventually established in Lisbon, Portugal. More recently years he has resumed his earlier research on the analysis of complex networks.

== Selected publications ==
- Matthias Dehmer, Abbe Mowshowitz, Frank Emmert-Streib, Connections between Classical and Parametric Network Entropies, PLoS ONE 6(1): 2011, e15733.
- Matthias Dehmer and Abbe Mowshowitz, A history of graph entropy measures, Information Sciences 181, 2011, pp. 57–78.
- Abbe Mowshowitz, Technology as excuse for questionable ethics. AI & Society 22, 2008, pp. 271–282.
- Abbe Mowshowitz and Murray Turoff, eds. The digital society. Communications of the ACM 48(10), 2005, pp. 32–74.
- Abbe Mowshowitz and Akira Kawaguchi, Bias on the Web. Communications of the ACM, 45 (9), 2002, pp. 56–60.
- Abbe Mowshowitz, Virtual Organization: Toward a Theory of Societal Transformation Stimulated by Information Technology (Westport: Quorum Books, 2002)
- Abbe Mowshowitz, ed. Virtual organization, Communications of the ACM, 40(9), 1997, pp. 30–37.
- Abbe Mowshowitz, Virtual feudalism. In: P.J. Denning and R.M. Metcalf, eds. Beyond Calculation: the Next Fifty Years of Computing New York: Copernicus (Springer-Verlag, 1997, pp. 213–231).
- Abbe Mowshowitz, On the theory of virtual organization, Systems Research and Behavioral Science, 14(6),1997, pp. 373–384.
- Abbe Mowshowitz, On the market value of information commodities: I. The nature of information and information commodities. Journal of the American Society for Information Science, 43, 1992, pp. 225–232.
- Abbe Mowshowitz, On the market value of information commodities: II. Supply price. Journal of the American Society for Information Science, 43, 1992, pp. 233–241.
- Abbe Mowshowitz, On the market value of information commodities: III. Demand Price. Journal of the American Society for Information Science, 43, 1992, pp. 242–248.
- Abbe Mowshowitz, Information, Globalization, and National Sovereignty. Report, Office of Technology Assessment, Congress of the United States, 1987.
- Abbe Mowshowitz, On approaches to the study of social issues in computing, Communications of the ACM 24, 1981, pp. 146‑155.
- Abbe Mowshowitz, ed. Human Choice and Computers, 2. Proceedings of the Second IFIP Conference on Human Choice and Computers, Baden, Austria, June 4‑8, 1979 (Amsterdam: North‑Holland, 1980)
- Abbe Mowshowitz, Inside Information: Computers in Fiction (Reading: Addison-Wesley, 1977)
- Abbe Mowshowitz, The Conquest of Will: Information Processing in Human Affairs (Reading: Addison-Wesley, 1976)
- Abbe Mowshowitz, Entropy and the complexity of graphs: I. An index of the relative complexity of a graph, Bulletin of Mathematical Biophysics 30, 1968, pp. 175‑204.
- Abbe Mowshowitz, Entropy and the complexity of graphs: II. The information content of digraphs and infinite graphs, Bulletin of Mathematical Biophysics 30, 1968, pp. 225‑240.
- Abbe Mowshowitz, Entropy and the complexity of graphs: III. Graphs with prescribed information content, Bulletin of Mathematical Biophysics 30, 1968, pp. 387‑414.
- Abbe Mowshowitz, Entropy and the complexity of graphs: IV. Entropy measures and graphical structure, Bulletin of Mathematical Biophysics 30, 1968, pp. 533‑546.
