= Abbe Ibrahim =

Togolese footballer

Personal information
- Full name: Abdoulaye Ibrahim
- Date of birth: July 25, 1986 (age 40)
- Place of birth: Lomé, Togo
- Height: 5 ft 9 in (1.75 m)
- Position: Forward

Youth career
- 1999–2005: FC Espoire

Senior career*
Years	Team	Apps	(Gls)
2005	MetroStars	16	(2)
2007	Toronto FC	1	(0)
2007–2008	AFC United	12	(0)
2008–2009	Kharkiv	12	(0)
2009	New York Greek American	2	
2009–2010	Ceahlaul Piatra Neamt	16	(2)
2010–2013	CF Mounana	77	(21)

International career
2006–2007	Togo U-20	2	(0)
- * Club domestic league appearances and goals as of 18 August 2023

Abdoulaye (Abbe) Ibrahim (born July 25, 1986 in Lomé, Togo) is a football striker. In 2023, years after Abdoulaye’s professional career, he coached Scarsdale Youth Soccer Club in Westchester County, New York. He is the head coach of the U14 boys' team leading them to a great season in the Westchester league.

== Career ==
Ibrahim, a Togolese youth international, has been watched by several top European clubs, including Manchester United. Unable to sign in Europe because of visa problems, he signed with the MetroStars in early 2005 after impressing in the pre-season. He was the first Togolese player in Major League Soccer. While showing flashes of top speed, Abbe scored two goals and added three assists in his rookie year. His rights were traded to Toronto FC on 25 January 2007, and in April 2007, he signed a senior contract with the expansion club.

Toronto FC waived Ibrahim in late June 2007 to make space for the signing of Collin Samuel. In February 2008, signed a three-year contract with FC Kharkiv in Ukraine. Ibrahim played two games for New York Greek American in September 2009. In 2011, he moved to Dynamic Togolais.
