= Robert Abbe =

American surgeon and radiologist

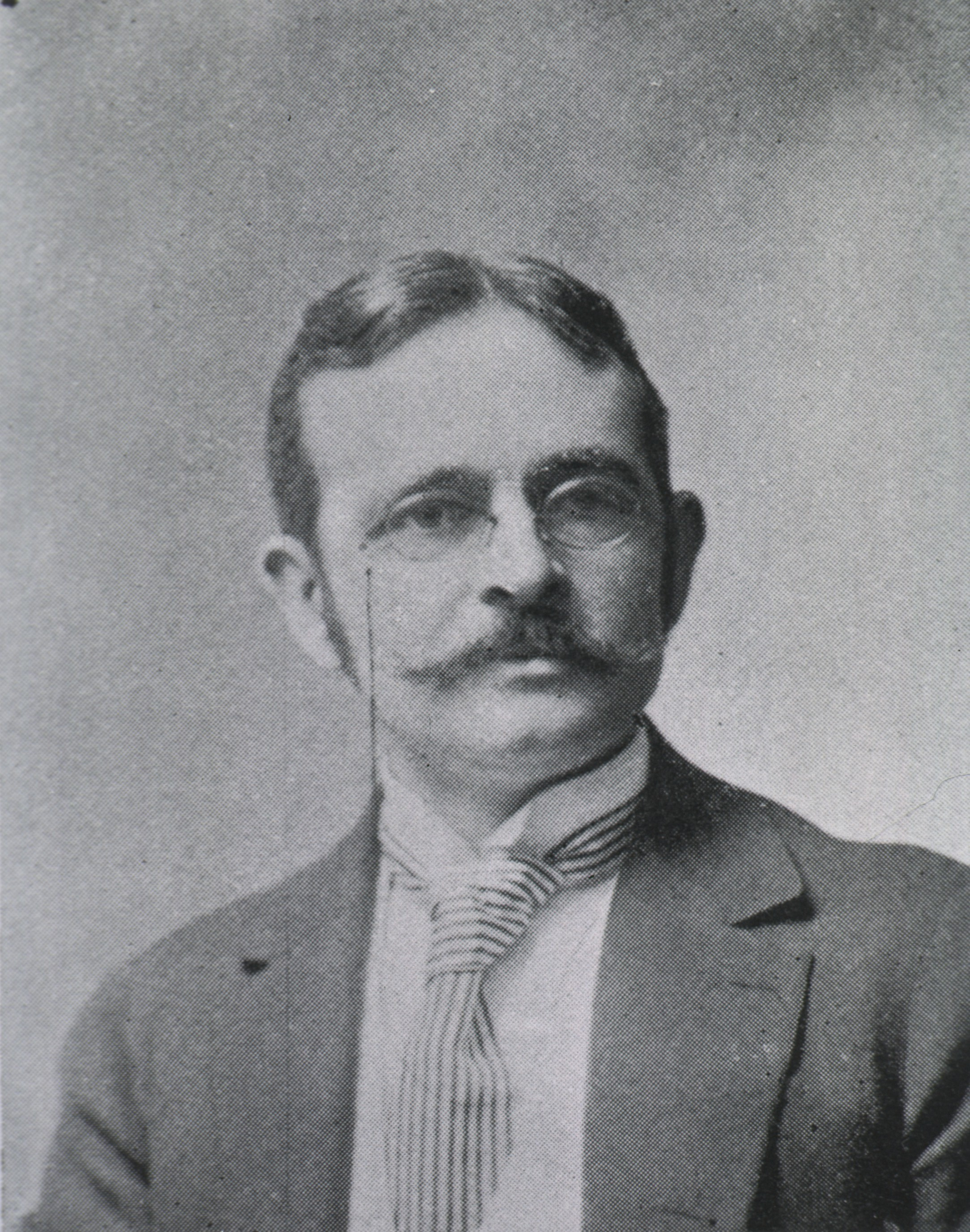
- Abbe in c. 1900
- Born: April 13, 1851; New York City
- Died: March 7, 1928 (aged 76); New York City
- Burial place: Woodlawn Cemetery
- Education: College of the City of New York; Columbia University
- Known for: Radiation oncology
- Scientific career
- Fields: Medicine
- Workplaces: New York Hospital; St. Luke's Hospital

Robert Abbe (April 13, 1851 – March 7, 1928) was an American surgeon and pioneer radiologist in New York City. He was born in New York City and educated at the College of the City of New York (S.B., 1871) and Columbia University (M.D., 1874).

Abbe was most known as a plastic surgeon, and between 1877 and 1884 he served as a surgeon and professor of surgery at New York Hospital, St. Luke's Hospital, and New York Babies Hospital. During this time, he would spend summers travelling, and he amassed a large collection of Wabanaki artifacts and archaeological materials, and in 1927 founded the Abbe Museum of Native American artifacts in Bar Harbor, Maine, where he maintained a summer residence.

He is credited with the lip switch flap, which now bears his name. An Italian surgeon named Sabattini described the flap 60 years earlier. Although Sabattini published his technique, it was printed in a book with a limited circulation.

He died of aplastic anemia, possibly due to his work handling radium.

== Radiologist ==
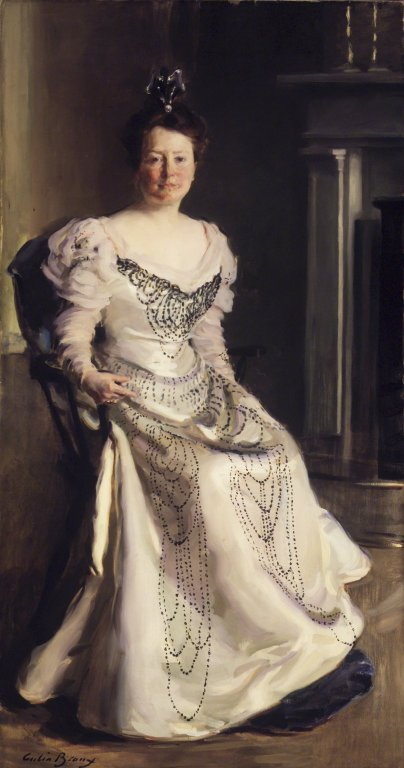
Mrs. Robert Abbe (Catherine Amory Bennett)

Abbe was a renowned surgeon and medical pioneer. He was an attending surgeon at Roosevelt Hospital (now Mount Sinai West) in New York, where the plastic surgical laboratory is named for him. He was a lecturer and fellow of the College of Physicians of Philadelphia and Vice President of the Academy of Medicine.

He befriended the Curies, and in particular Marie Curie. He collected many photographs of her, documented the production of radium, and explored, with her, the medical uses of radiation and x-rays. In 1904, he introduced the practice of using radiation to treat cancer and founded the science of radiation oncology.

In 1904, after corresponding with Professor and Madame Curie, he visited their laboratories in Paris. Joining in their groundbreaking research, he became the founder of radiation therapy in the United States. He was a vigorous opponent of the use of tobacco which he considered a cause of cancer and reported over 100 cases of smoker's cancer. In later years, at his Bar Harbor, Maine, summer home, "Brook End," Abbe created a garden in whose pool floated two swans – Pierre and Marie.

== Museum ==
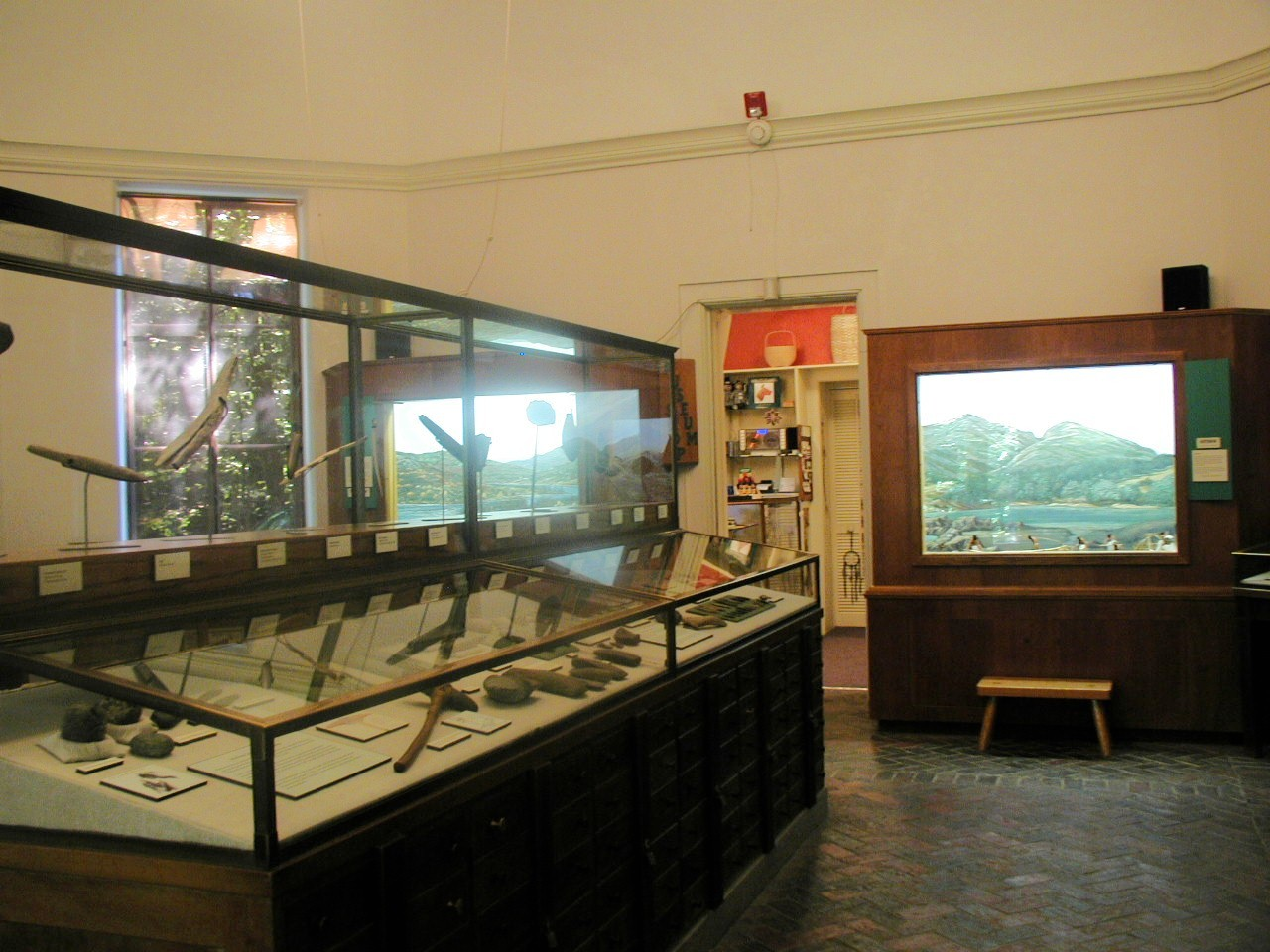
Abbe Museum in Acadia National Park

Abbe was a well-known summer resident of Bar Harbor. Contemporary accounts note that he was held in high regard by those who knew him, and his association with the museum continues to be acknowledged by visitors.

While summering in Bar Harbor, Abbe was fascinated by the Wabanaki tools found in nearby shell heaps. As he began collecting these artifacts, he realized the need for safe permanent storage. Even during a long illness, probably a result of his exposure to radium, he labored to establish the museum. His dreams of a museum became reality with the help of friends such as George Dorr and Charles Eliot, the founding fathers of Acadia National Park. The dedication of the museum on August 14, 1928, was also a memorial to Robert Abbe. He had died just five months before.

Abbe amassed a sizeable collection of Native American archaeological material during his summers on Mount Desert Island. Opened in 1928, the Abbe was one of the first museums built in Maine. Its founding coincided with that of the national park, which was established as Lafayette National Park in 1919, renamed to Acadia National Park in 1929. The Abbe was conceived as a trailside museum to complement the park's offerings. Today it is one of only two remaining private trailside museums in national parks, the other one being the Borax Museum in Death Valley, California.

Robert Abbe was a man of many talents and interests. He was a photographer and an artist, painting, creating line drawings and molded maps. His large map "The Land of Dawn" is on display in the museum. The watercolor sketch on the right, of the museum, was completed by Abbe shortly before his death.

== Family ==
Abbe was the brother of Cleveland Abbe, and the uncle of Cleveland Abbe Jr. and Truman Abbe.

Robert Abbe died at his home in Manhattan on March 7, 1928, and was buried at Woodlawn Cemetery.
