= Abbe-Estlander operation =

Abbe-Estlander operation is a surgical procedure for lip reconstruction, in which a flap of tissue from one lip of the mouth is grafted to the other lip, in order to correct a defect from trauma, vascular malformations, surgical wound or infections. This is done using a pedicle (i.e., part attached to the donor site) that has an arterial supply.

As Abbe-Estlander usually refers to using a section of the lower lip to reconstruct the upper lip, the so-called "reverse Abbe flap" or "Estlander-Abbe flap" refers to using tissue from the upper lip to reconstruct a defect in the lower lip.

== History ==
Also known as a cross-flap operation, it was named after R. Abbé (1851–1928), an American surgeon, and J. A. Estlander (1831–81), a Finnish surgeon.

== Indications ==
Abbe-Estlander flap can be used to repair defects of one-third to two-thirds of the upper or lower lip. In cases of larger defects, it may be employed to reconstitute the oral commissure together with other methods of reconstruction. Estlander flaps are suited for patients with a full thickness defect of a lip up to and including the commissure.

In addition to repairs due to trauma, surgical removal of lesions or cancerous tissue, vascular malformations, or infections, it can, in some cases, be used to correct small upper lip defects.

Although upper lip defects of 25% or less and lower lip defects of 33% or less can be closed primarily, the Abbe flap may be used in small defects where the philtral column is involved and requires reconstruction.

== Procedure ==
In the Abbe-Estlander procedure a portion of the intact lip (upper or lower) is rotated across the mouth and into the defect of the damaged lip, while maintaining the blood supply from the labial artery. The blood supply of the flap will be established to the point where the artery can be divided, in 10–14 days. The second-stage procedure, is done to divide and inset the flap, to reestablish the commissure.

The Abbe flap has an excellent cosmetic result when it is used to replace the entire philtrum of the upper lip. Preferably, the flap is taken from as close to the oral commissure as possible, in order to allow for more proximal blood supply, and to maintain the oral opening as wide as possible. The repair process then takes two surgeries with attention to assure continuity of the vermilion border.

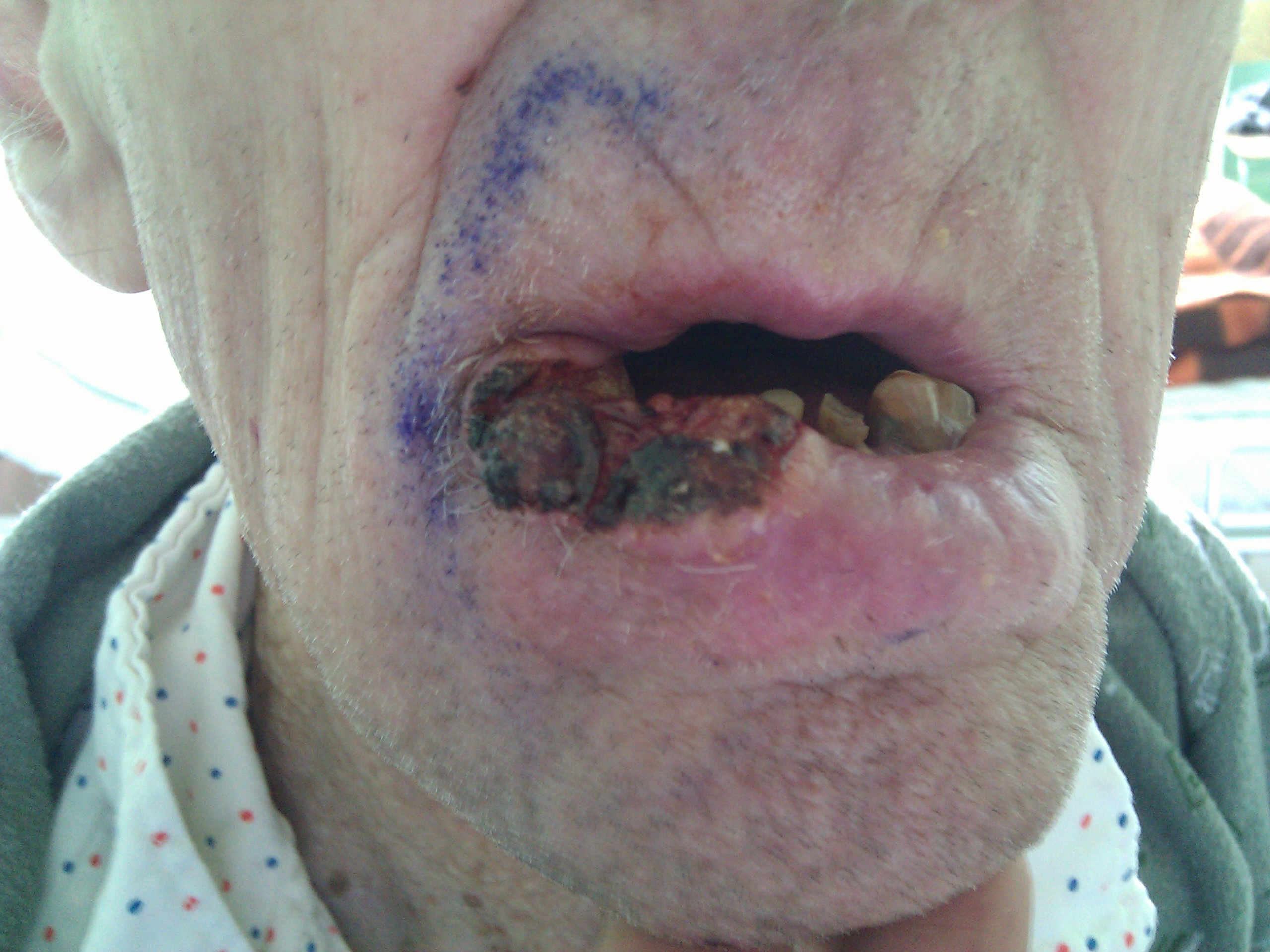
Large squamous-cell carcinoma (SCC) of lower lip

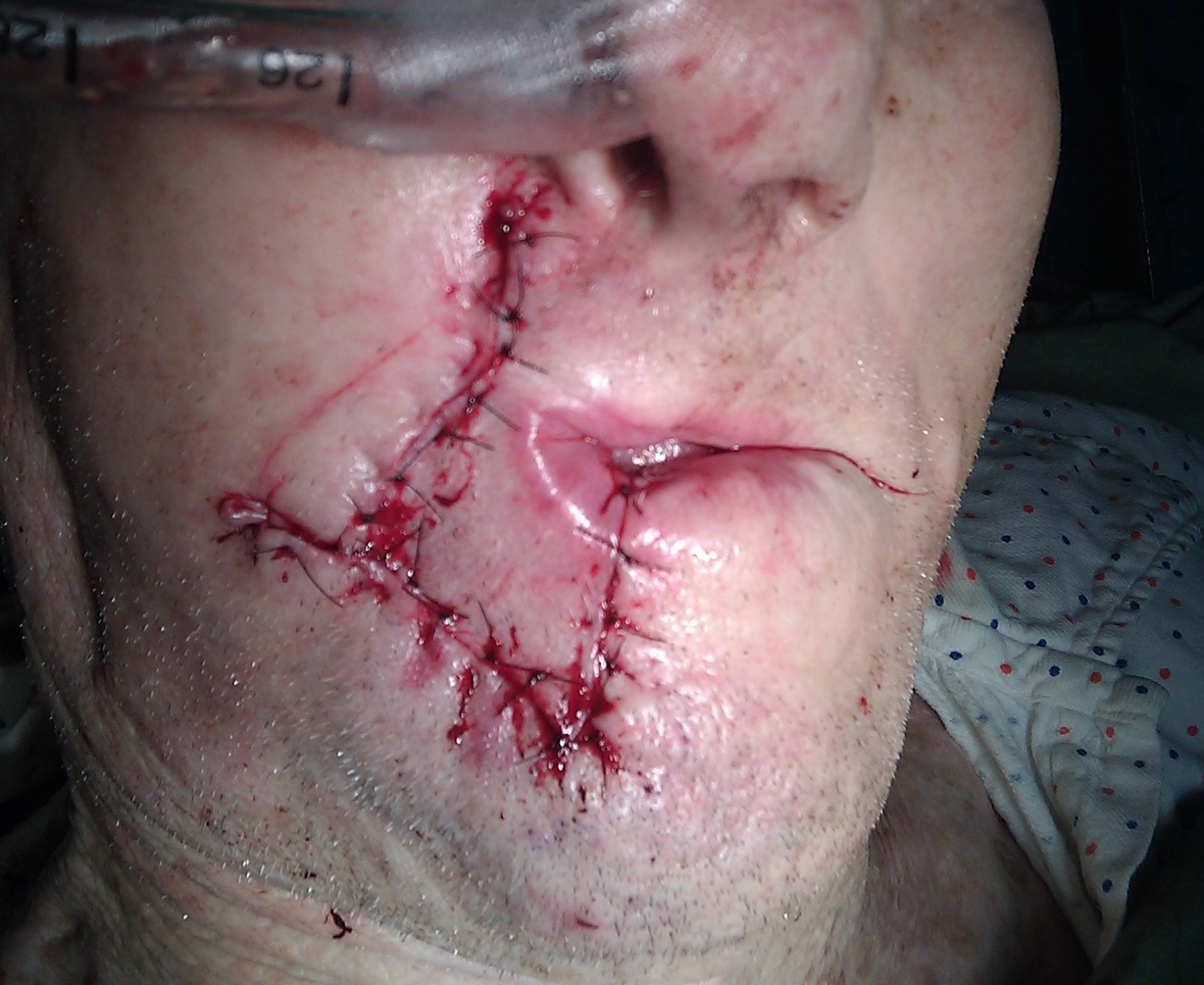
Suture intraoperatively

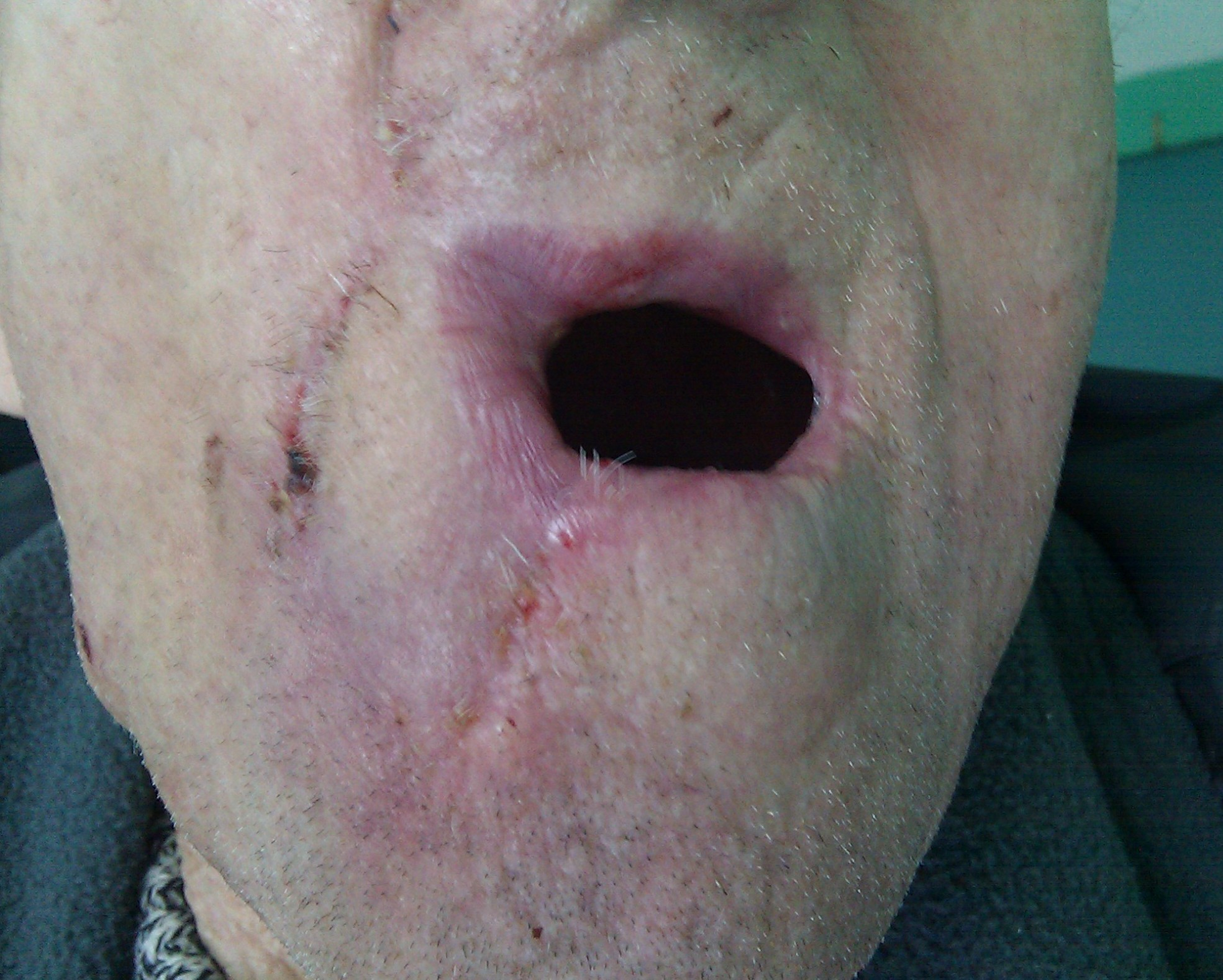
Followup 12 days after 1st surgery

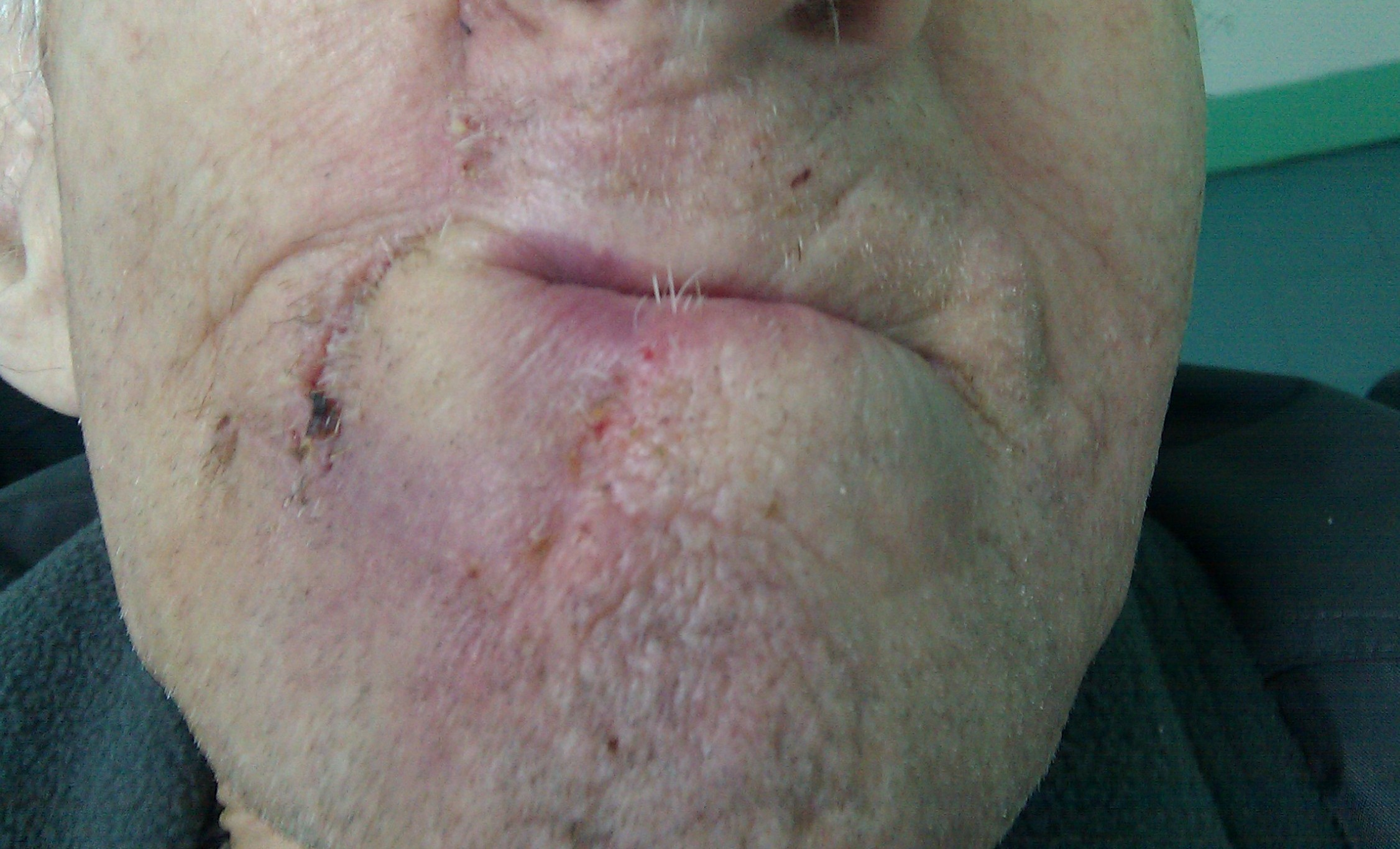
Followup 12 days after 1st surgery

Some notable cases in medical journals include repairs after severe injusy, lesion or carcinoma excision, and a secondary cleft lip reconstruction.

== Complications ==
Although in most indicated cases of lip reconstruction, the Abbé-Estlander flap is associated with minimal risk of flap failure, there can be less desirable consequences.

== See also ==
- Lip reconstruction
- Plastic Surgery
