= Cleveland Abbe =

American meteorologist (1838–1916)

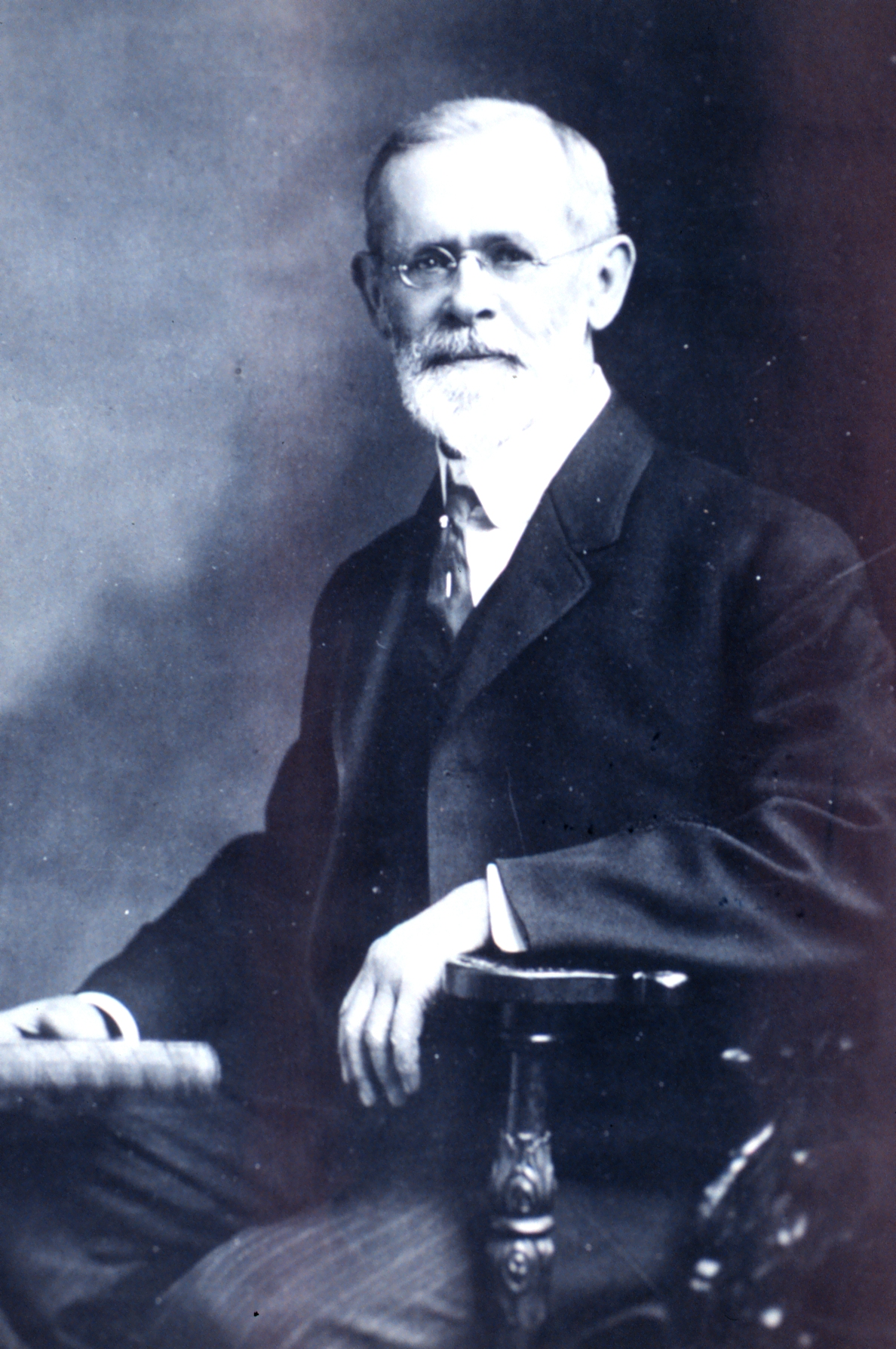
- Born: December 3, 1838; New York City, New York, U.S.
- Died: October 28, 1916 (aged 77); Chevy Chase, Maryland, U.S.
- Resting place: Rock Creek Cemetery; Washington, D.C., U.S. Section M, Lot 292, Range 5
- Education: Free Academy of the City of New York, BA, 1857: Free Academy of the City of New York, MA, 1860; Harvard University, BS, 1864
- Occupation: Meteorologist
- Organizations: United States Weather Bureau; National Geographic Society; Free academy of the City of New York
- Spouse: Frances Martha Neal (1870–1908): Margaret A. Percival (1909–1916)
- Children: Cleveland Abbe Jr. Truman Abbe
- Awards: Symons Gold Medal (1912); Public Welfare Medal (1916)

Signature
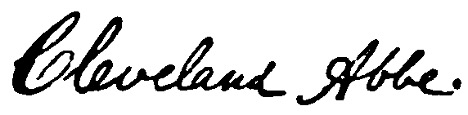

Cleveland Abbe (December 3, 1838 – October 28, 1916) was an American meteorologist and advocate of time zones.

While director of the Cincinnati Observatory in Cincinnati, Ohio, from 1871–1916, he developed a system of telegraphic weather reports, daily weather maps, and weather forecasts. In 1870, Congress established the United States Weather Bureau and inaugurated the use of daily weather forecasts. In recognition of his work, Abbe, who was often referred to as "Old Probability" for the reliability of his forecasts, was appointed the first head of the new service.

== Early life and education ==
Cleveland Abbe was born in New York City in 1838 and grew up in the prosperous merchant family of George Waldo and Charlotte Colgate Abbe. One of his younger brothers, Robert, became a prominent surgeon and radiologist. In school, Cleveland excelled in mathematics and chemistry, attending David B. Scott Grammar School, and graduating in 1857 from the Free Academy of the City of New York with a Bachelor of Arts. While at Free Academy of the City of New York, he learned under Oliver Wolcott Gibbs.

He tutored mathematics at the Trinity Latin School in New York City in 1857 and 1858. He then taught engineering, as an assistant professor at the University of Michigan (Note: One source states that he taught engineering at the Michigan Agricultural College instead.) in 1859, followed by a tutoring job, also in engineering, until he left in 1860. During this stay in Michigan, he also was studying astronomy under Franz Brünnow from 1858 to 1859. He received his second degree, a Master of Arts in 1860, from City College. When the US Civil War broke out, he tried to join the Union Army; however, he failed the vision test, due to myopia, and spent the war years in Cambridge, Massachusetts, attending Harvard, and working as an assistant to Benjamin Gould, astronomer and head of the Longitude Department of the United States Coast Survey. He received his Bachelor of Science degree from Harvard in 1864, which also marked the end of his working at the U.S. Coast Survey. It was while in Cambridge that he rubbed shoulders with scientists from the Nautical Almanac, specifically, William Ferrel, which probably piqued his meteorological curiosity.

He then studied abroad in Russia at the Observatory of Pulkovo, as a guest, and returned, in 1866, to the U.S. eager to study astronomy. It was said that he was his happiest while in Russia, as like-minded intellectuals surrounded him. While in Russia, he formed a relationship with Otto Struve and enjoyed the scenery.

== Career ==
His first job in astronomy was at the United States Naval Observatory from 1867–1868 as an aide, until the Cincinnati Astronomical Society offered him the director position at the Cincinnati Observatory in 1868. He spent a few years in Cincinnati, but his interests were already evolving. Remembering that meteorological conditions directly affected the work of astronomers, he began working in the field of meteorology. He won approval to report on and predict the weather, working on the premise that forecasts could and should be generated at minimal expense and in such a way as to perhaps even produce income. By 1873 he was let go by the Cincinnati Observatory due to funding issues and it was then that he made the decision that would change his career path.

=== Meteorology ===
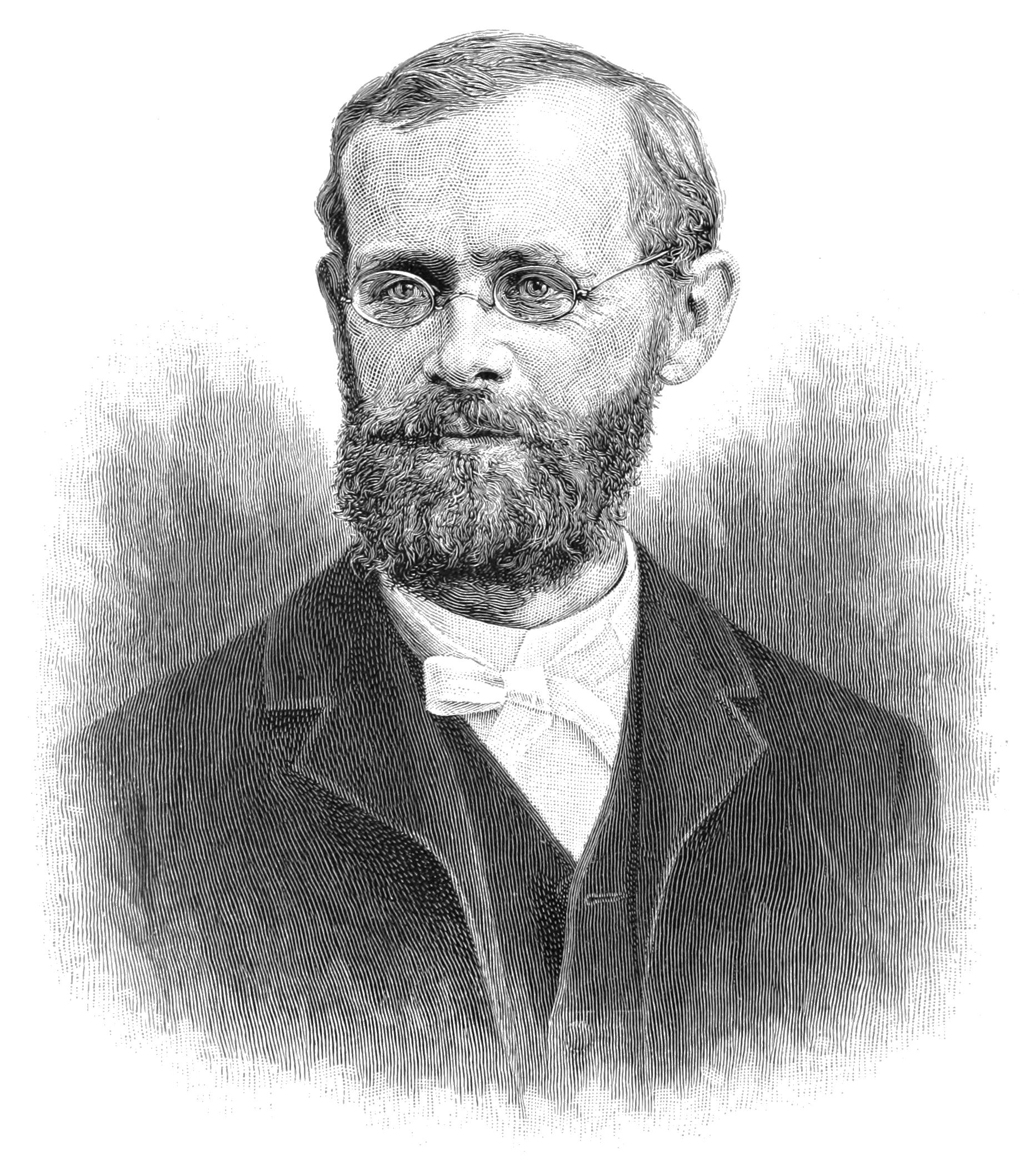
Portrait of Abbe published in Popular Science Monthly

His first work on weather was centered on forecasting and issuance of warnings for severe weather. This preliminary work was started while still in Cincinnati. His first bulletin was issued on 1 September 1869.

Abbe was appointed chief meteorologist at the United States Weather Bureau on 3 January 1871, which at the time was part of the U.S. Signal Corps. One of the first things that he addressed was the forecasting dimension of meteorology. He recognized that predicting the weather required a widespread, yet coordinated team. And so with short-term funding granted from the Cincinnati Chamber of Commerce, he enlisted twenty volunteer weather observers to help report conditions. Western Union agreed to permit the observers to communicate without charge, and Abbe and his team went to work. He selected data-collecting instruments that would be critical to the success of weather predicting, and he trained Army observer sergeants in their use. Field data was transmitted using code designed to minimize word count. Each message started with a station location, with code words for temperature, pressure, dew point, precipitation and wind direction, cloud observations, wind velocity and sunset observations. At the designated times, information flooded the transmission stations. Clerks would then decode and record the messages and manually enter data onto weather maps, which were then used to predict the weather.

On February 19, 1871, Abbe personally gave the first official weather report. He continued to forecast alone for the next six months, while simultaneously training others. He was joined in mid-1871 by two Army lieutenants and a civilian professor in giving reports, and the team was then able to rotate the heavy workload. Abbe demanded precise language in the forecasts and ensured that every forecast covered four key meteorological elements: weather (clouds and precipitation), temperature, wind direction, and barometric pressure. By the end of the first year of reporting, over 60 copies of weather charts had been sent to Congress, the press, and various scientific institutions. By 1872, Abbe regularly sent over 500 sets of daily maps and bulletins overseas in exchange for European meteorological data. Abbe also insisted on verifying predictions. During the first year of operation, in 1871, Abbe and his staff verified 69 percent of their predictions; the annual report apologized for the other 31 percent, citing the time constraints as the cause.

In 1872, Abbe founded and was the initial editor of the Monthly Weather Review. He also was the editor from 1892 until 1915 just before his death. The Mount Weather Observatory in Virginia also produced a weather bulletin, of which Abbe was the editor from 1909 to 1913.

In order to compile his information, Abbe required a time-keeping system that was consistent among the stations. To accomplish this he divided the United States into four standard time zones. In 1879, he published a paper titled Report on Standard Time. In 1883, he convinced North American railroad companies to adopt his time-zone system. In 1884, Britain, which had already adopted its own standard time system for England, Scotland, and Wales, helped gather international consent for global time. In time, the American government, influenced in part by his 1879 paper, adopted the time-zone system.

Abbe required that the weather service stay at the forefront of technology. Over time, the instrument division at the headquarters tested and calibrated thousands of devices and even began to design and build their own instruments. By the end of the century, self-registering equipment came into use, and the United States led the meteorological world with 114 Class I (automatic recording) observation stations. Anticipating an increase in international cooperation, Abbe began to seek quality instruments calibrated to international standards. He enlisted Oliver Wolcott Gibbs of Harvard and Arthur Wright of Yale to design improved equipment. For comparison purposes, Abbe ordered a barometer from Heinrich Wild (director of the Nicholas Central Observatory in Russia), as well as an anemometer and several types of hygrometers from Germany. Abbe then invented an anemobarometer to test the effect of chimney and window drafts on barometers in enclosed spaces.

Abbe returned to academia in 1886, when he accepted a professorship at Columbian University, where he taught meteorology and remained until 1905. He was a regular lecturer at Johns Hopkins from 1896 through 1914. He has authored nearly 300 scientific papers. He was the recipient of three honorary degrees. His original school of higher learning, the City College of New York awarded him a PhD in 1891, in 1888 the University of Michigan gave Abbe an LL D as did the University of Glasgow in 1896. Harvard University gave him the S.B. degree in 1900.

Abbe was elected as a member of the American Philosophical Society in 1871. Associate Fellow of the American Academy of Arts and Sciences in 1884. In 1912 the Royal Meteorological Society presented him with their Symons Gold Medal, citing his contribution "to instrumental, statistical, dynamical, and thermo dynamical meteorology and forecasting." In 1916 he was awarded the Public Welfare Medal from the National Academy of Sciences, which also gave him the Marcellus Hartley Medal. He was also one of the 33 founders of the National Geographic Society.

== Personal life and death ==
In 1870 he married Frances Martha Neal who died in 1908. In 1909 he married Margaret Augusta Percival. Abbe enjoyed ethnology, oriental archaeology, geology, botany, and music in his off time.

Abbe died in 1916 aged 77 years in Chevy Chase, MD after more than 45 years of scientific achievement. He was buried in Rock Creek Cemetery in Washington, D.C.

== Monthly Weather Review ==
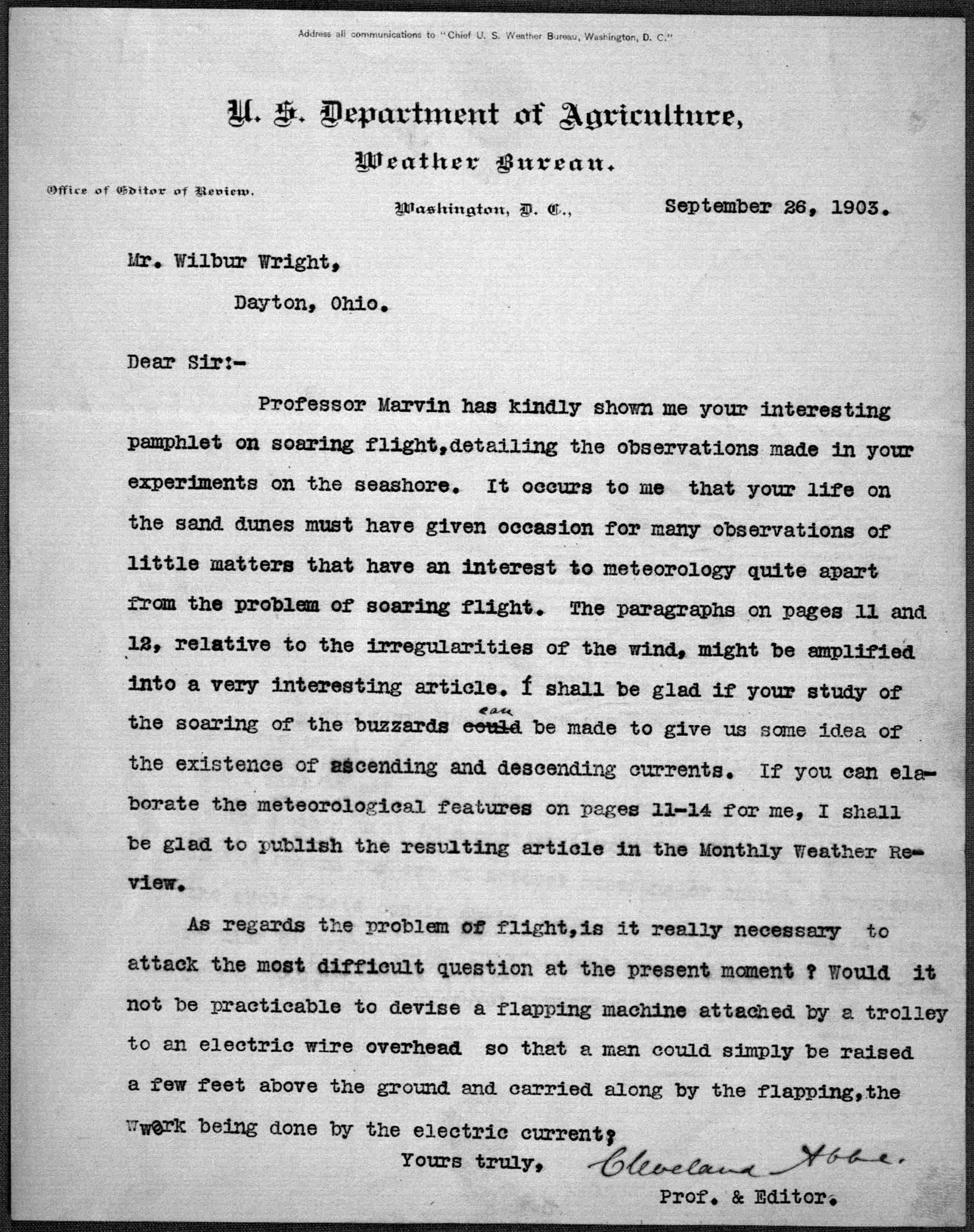
Cleveland Abbe letter to Wilbur Wright inviting publication of an article on "soaring flight" in the Monthly Weather Review

Cleveland Abbe founded the scientific journal Monthly Weather Review in 1872. The Monthly Weather Review began as a government publication under the United States Army Signal Corps. In 1891, the Signal Office's meteorological responsibilities were transferred to the Weather Bureau under the United States Department of Agriculture. The Weather Bureau published the review until 1970, when the bureau became part of the newly formed National Oceanic and Atmospheric Administration. NOAA published the review until the end of 1973. Since 1974, this well-respected scientific journal has been published by the American Meteorological Society.

== Timeline ==
December 2, 1838
Born, New York, NY
1857
B.A., College of the City of New York, New York, NY
1859–1860
Taught engineering at the University of Michigan, Ann Arbor, MI. Studied astronomy under Franz Brünnow
1860
M.A., College of the City of New York, New York, NY
1861–1864
Assisted Benjamin Apthorp Gould on longitude determinations for the United States Coast Survey
1864–1866
Guest astronomer, Observatory of Pulkovo, Russia
1867–1868
Aid, United States Naval Observatory
1868–1873
Director, Cincinnati Observatory, Cincinnati, OH
1869
Began publishing daily weather reports for the Cincinnati Chamber of Commerce
May 10, 1870
Married Frances Martha Neal (died 1908)
1871–1916
Meteorologist, United States Signal Corps and the United States Weather Bureau
1884–1916
Professor of meteorology, Columbian (George Washington) University, Washington, DC
1895–1916
Lecturer on meteorology, Johns Hopkins University, Baltimore, MD
1906
Awarded the Franklin Medal by the American Philosophical Society
April 12, 1909
Married Margaret Augusta Percival
1912
Awarded the Symons Gold Medal by the Royal Meteorological Society of London
1916
Awarded the Marcellus Hartley Medal by the National Academy of Sciences
October 28, 1916
Died, Chevy Chase, MD

== Selected writings ==
His publications include:

- Döllen, William (1870). The Portable Transit Instrument in the Vertical of the Pole Star. Translated from the original by Abbe, Cleveland. Washington, DC: Government Printing Office. LCCN 05037854.
- Abbe, Cleveland (1879). Report on Standard Time.
- —— (1881). Report on the Solar Eclipse of July, 1878. Washington, DC: Government Printing Office. LCCN 05008108. OCLC 006070415.
- —— (1883). An Account of Progress in Meteorology and Allied Subjects in the Years 1879–'81. Washington, DC: Government Printing Office. LCCN 06045167.
- —— (1884). Meteorology in the United States. OCLC 37441190.
- —— (1884). An Account of Progress in Meteorology in the Year 1883. Washington, DC: Government Printing Office. LCCN tmp80002210.
- —— (1885). An Account of Progress in Meteorology in the Year 1884. Washington, DC: Government Printing Office. LCCN tmp80002209.
- —— (1888). Treatise on Meteorological Apparatus and Methods. Washington, DC: Government Printing Office. OCLC 019840090.
- —— (1889). Preliminary Studies for Storm and Weather Predictions.
- —— (1890). Preparatory Studies for Deductive Methods in Storm & Weather Predictions. Washington, DC: Government Printing Office. LCCN 82089764. OCLC 003128296.
- —— (1891). The Mechanics of the Earth's Atmosphere [First Collection]. Washington, DC: Smithsonian Institution. LCCN 16006879.
- —— (1893). The Mechanics of the Earth's Atmosphere [Second Collection]. Washington, DC: Smithsonian Institution. LCCN 09016860.
- ——; Fernow, Bernhard Eduard; Harrington, Mark Walrod; Curtis, George E. (1893). "Determination of the True Amount of Precipitation and its Bearing on Theories of Forest Influences". Forest Influences. Washington, DC: Government Printing Office. LCCN 09000380.
- —— (1896). The Altitude of the Aurora.
- ——; Fassig, Oliver Lanard; Walz, Ferdinand Jackson (1899). Report on the Meteorology of Maryland. Baltimore, MD: Johns Hopkins Press. OCLC 010761578.
- —— (1902). Physical Basis of Long Range Forecastings.
- —— (1905). Moore, Willis L. (ed.). A First Report on the Relations Between Climates and Crops. Washington, DC: Government Printing Office. LCCN 06009659. OCLC 003467781.
- —— (1907). Smithsonian Meteorological Tables (3rd ed.). Washington, DC: Smithsonian Institution. LCCN 08011106. OCLC 067401696.
- —— (1907). "The Progress of Science as Illustrated by the Development of Meteorology". Annual Report of the Board of Regents of the Smithsonian Institution. ISSN 0096-4093. OCLC 021887138.
- ——; Nichols, Josephine Genung (1909). Townsend Genealogy: A Record of the Descendants of John Townsend: 1743–1821, and of his Wife, Jemina Travis: 1746–1832. New York, NY: F. Allaben Genealogical Company. LCCN 09007323. OCLC 002585878.
- —— (1910). The Mechanics of the Earth's Atmosphere [Third Collection]. Washington, DC: Smithsonian Institution. LCCN 10035870.
- —— (1915). Biographical Memoir of Charles Anthony Scott: 1826–1901. Washington, DC: The National Academy of Sciences. LCCN 45041777.
- ——; Nichols, Josephine Genung (1916). Abbe-Abbey Genealogy: In Memory of John Abbe and his Descendants. New Haven, CT: The Tuttle, Morehouse & Taylor Company. LCCN 17006241. OCLC 001855199.
- —— (1917). The Determination of Meteor-Orbits in the Solar System. Washington, DC: Government Printing Office. LCCN 17026378. OCLC 004663040.
