= Lip reconstruction =

Lip reconstruction may be required after trauma or surgical excision. The lips are considered the beginning of the oral cavity and are the most common site of oral cancer. Any reconstruction of the lips must include both functional and cosmetic considerations. The lips are necessary for speech, facial expression, and eating. Because of their prominent location on the face, even small abnormalities can be apparent.

== Relevant anatomy ==
=== Superficial ===
The upper and lower lips include the vermilion border. This is the juncture between the lighter skin and the redder tissue (vermilion) that we commonly call the lip. This tissue is red because the skin is thin and underlain by large numbers of capillaries. The vermilion is different both from the oral mucosa and from regular skin, as it includes a cornified stratum corneum and lacks salivary glands, unlike the oral mucosa, but is thinner and more vascularised than regular skin, and lacks both hair follicles and sweat glands.

The pattern of the vermilion border defines the areas of the lip:

- Philtrum-two vertical lines extending from the base of the nose to the central vermilion border, forming the bow of the central upper lip;
- Commissures-where the upper and lower lips meet laterally;
- Lateral upper lip-between philtrum and commissure.

=== Deep ===
The primary underlying muscle of the lips is the orbicularis oris. This circumferential muscle underlies the upper and lower lip. The muscle contracts the lips to allow for expression, speech, chewing and swallowing. It also maintains tone to prevent objects from falling out of the mouth (referred to as oral competence). Disruption of the circular nature of this muscle can have a significant effect on oral function.

In addition, there are other muscles both above and below the lips that attach either to the orbicularis oris or to the fibrous bands extending from the commissures.

=== Nerve supply ===
The muscles are supplied by two cranial nerves, the facial nerve and the trigeminal nerve.

The upper lip receives its sensibility from the infraorbital nerve, which is a branch of the maxillary division of the trigeminal nerve. The infraorbital nerve provides sensation to the upper lip, cheek, ala, and nasal sidewall. The sensory innervation of the lower lip is provided by the mental nerve. The mental nerve is the terminal branch of the inferior alveolar nerve, which in turn is a branch of the mandibular division of the trigeminal nerve.

=== Blood supply ===
The muscles and overlying skin are supplied by branches of the external carotid artery (the facial artery and Superior labial artery.

=== Lymph drainage ===
Submandibular/submental-Under the chin

== Principles of Reconstruction ==
- Preserve sensation of the lips
- Maintain oral competence
- Continuity of vermilion border
- Sufficient oral access (not too small, microstoma)
- Adequate lip appearance

== Types of defects ==
Lip defects are classified by their depth and their size. Superficial defects involve the skin and vermilion, and leave the underlying muscles, nerves and arteries undisturbed. Deep/full thickness defects include the underlying muscles, primarily the orbicularis oris. The nerve and blood supply may also be affected if the defect is large. Regardless of the depth or size, a successful lip reconstruction considers the five principles and the effect that the reconstruction has on the surrounding tissue.

=== Superficial upper lip reconstruction ===
Successful reconstruction of the upper lip attempts to maintain the anatomic relationship of the philtrum (central portion of upper lip) and the base of the nose. Not distorting the commissure is also desirable for upper lip reconstruction.

==== Central lip ====
- Straight line closure-may cause a pulling up of the vermilion border as it heals
- Advancement flaps-these pull in skin from the sides and heal best when the defect is the full height of the upper lip, can come in from one or both sides (single or double advancement)

==== Lateral lip ====
- Straight line closure
- A-T closure-extends the defect up to the philtrum or down to the vermilion border to make the scar less noticeable.
- Single Advancement-incision along vermilion border to pull tissue in from the lateral aspect
- Rotation flaps-rotate in tissue from the cheek

=== Superficial lower lip reconstruction ===
The anatomic requirements are not as limiting for the lower lip because the surrounding anatomy is less complex. The considerations include maintaining a non-distorted vermillion border, hiding incisions in the horizontal crease of the chin, and not distorting the commissure.

==== Vermilion only ====
- A-T closure
- Single or double advancement

==== Below the vermilion ====
- Single or double advancement
- A-T closure

=== Deep/full thickness lip reconstruction ===
Deeper and larger defects of the lip introduce greater reconstruction challenges, as they compromise the integrity of the orbicularis oris, its nerve and blood supply. Accordingly, there is a shift in emphasis toward the functional outcome of the reconstruction, and less focus on the appearance of the lip. All of the flaps described below can be used on the upper or lower lip.

==== Primary closure ====
Small defects of the upper and lower lip can be closed primarily. For the upper lip, defects of up to 1/4 (25%) of the lip may be closed primarily. For the lower lip, defects of up to 1/3 of the lip may be closed primarily. This means the edges of the defect are simply sutured together in three layers: oral mucosa, muscle, and skin. This closure has the best outcome because it re-establishes continuity of the orbicularis oris, which allows for oral competence, maximal preservation of sensation of the lip, continuity of vermilion border, and adequate size of the opening.

Large squamous-cell carcinoma (SCC) of lower lip

Resection of SCC intraoperatively

Followup after primary closure of lower lip SCC

==== Abbe lip switch ====
If the defect is between 1/3 and 2/3 the length of the lip it can be closed by an Abbe flap. The flap was developed by the American plastic surgeon Robert Abbe. It is based on a main artery of the orbicularis oris, the labial artery. A portion of the uninvolved lip (either upper or lower) is rotated across the mouth and into the defect of the involved lip while maintaining the blood supply from the labial artery. After 10–14 days, the blood supply of the flap has been established to the point where the artery can be divided. The Abbe flap has an excellent cosmetic result when it is used to replace the entire philtrum of the upper lip. Ideally, the flap should be taken from as close to the oral commissure as possible to allow for more proximal blood supply and to maintain the oral opening as wide as possible. This is called an Abbe-Estlander flap. This repair takes two surgeries and requires good planning to assure continuity of the vermilion border.

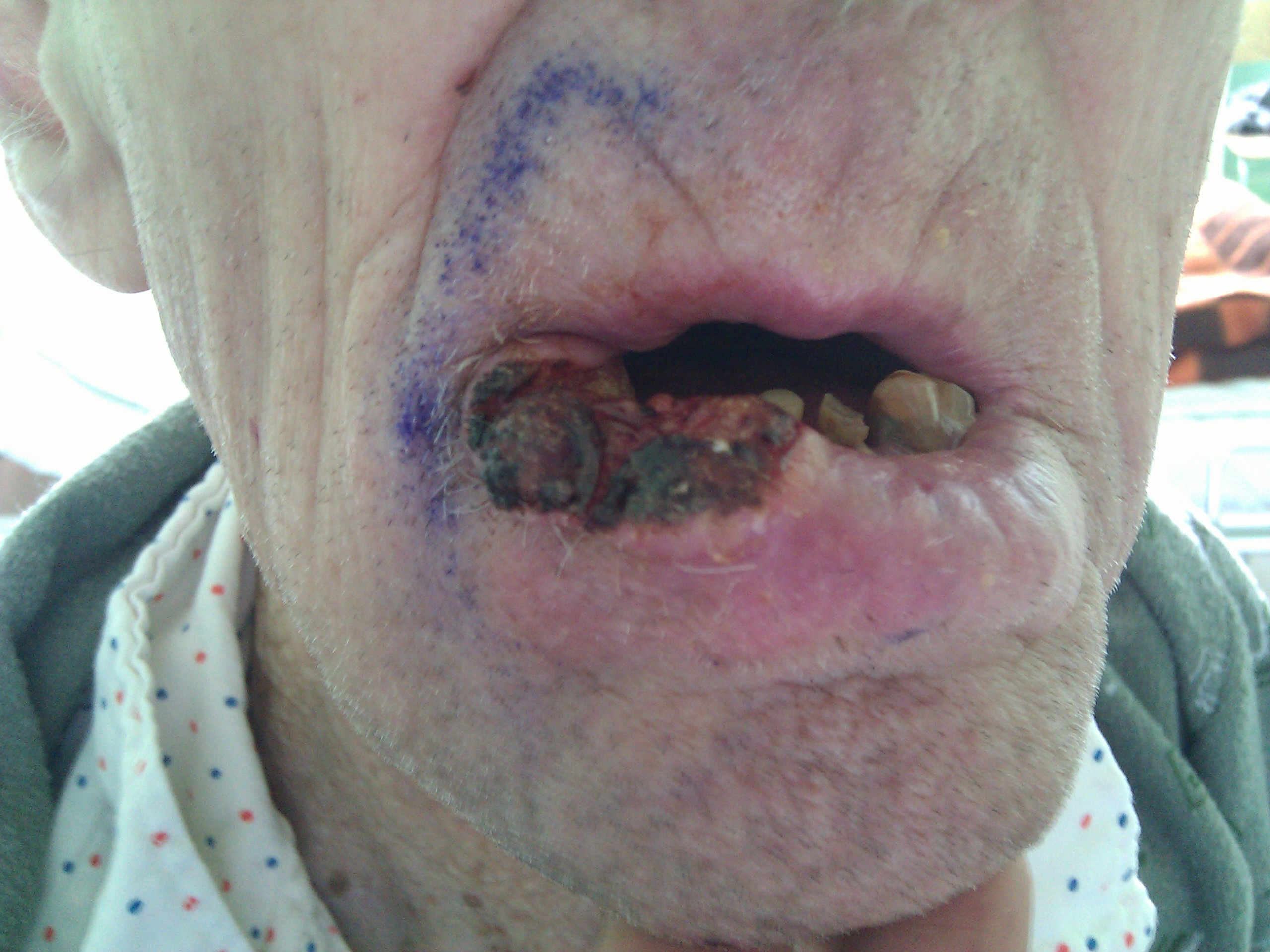
Large squamous-cell carcinoma (SCC) of lower lip

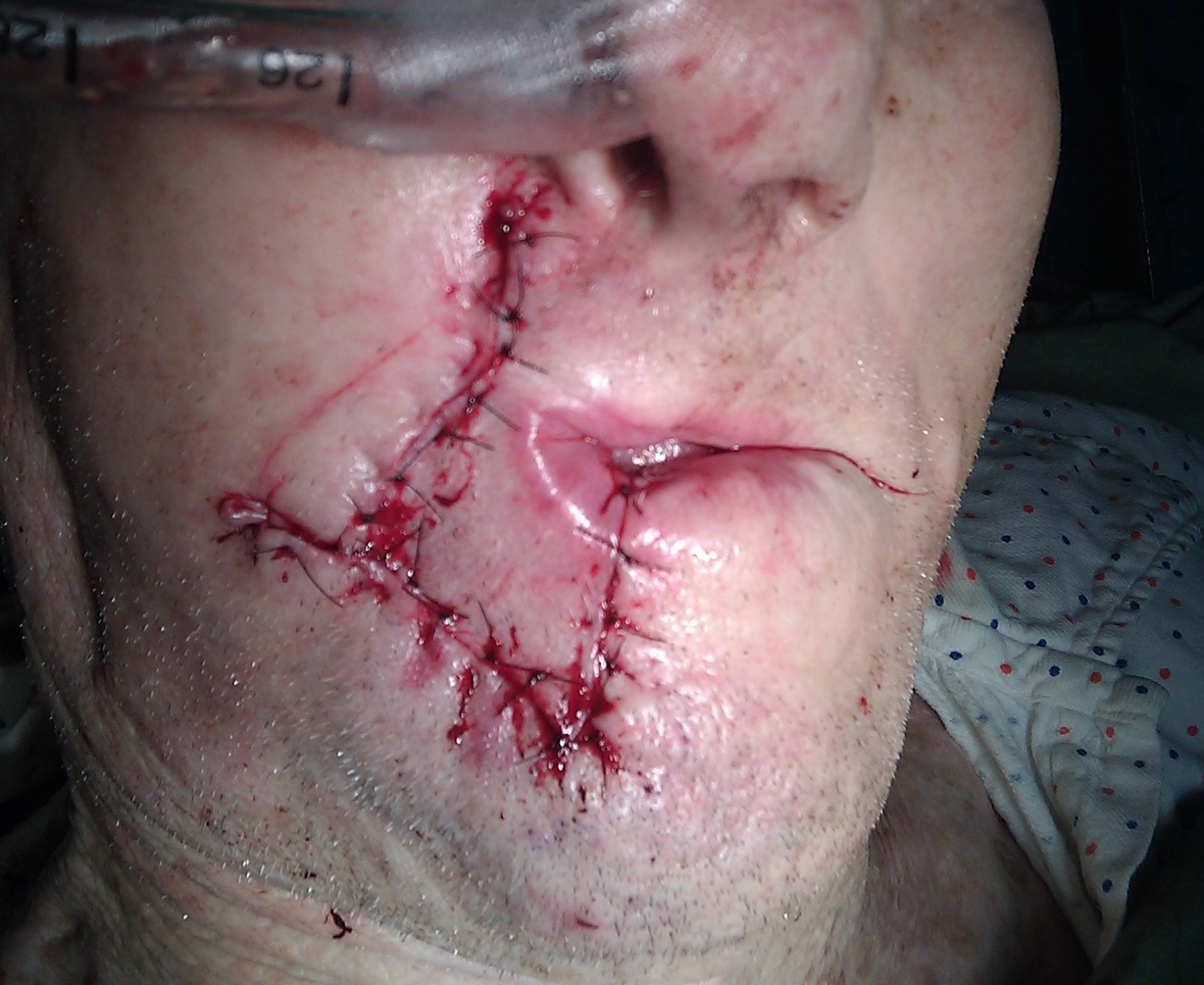
Suture intraoperatively

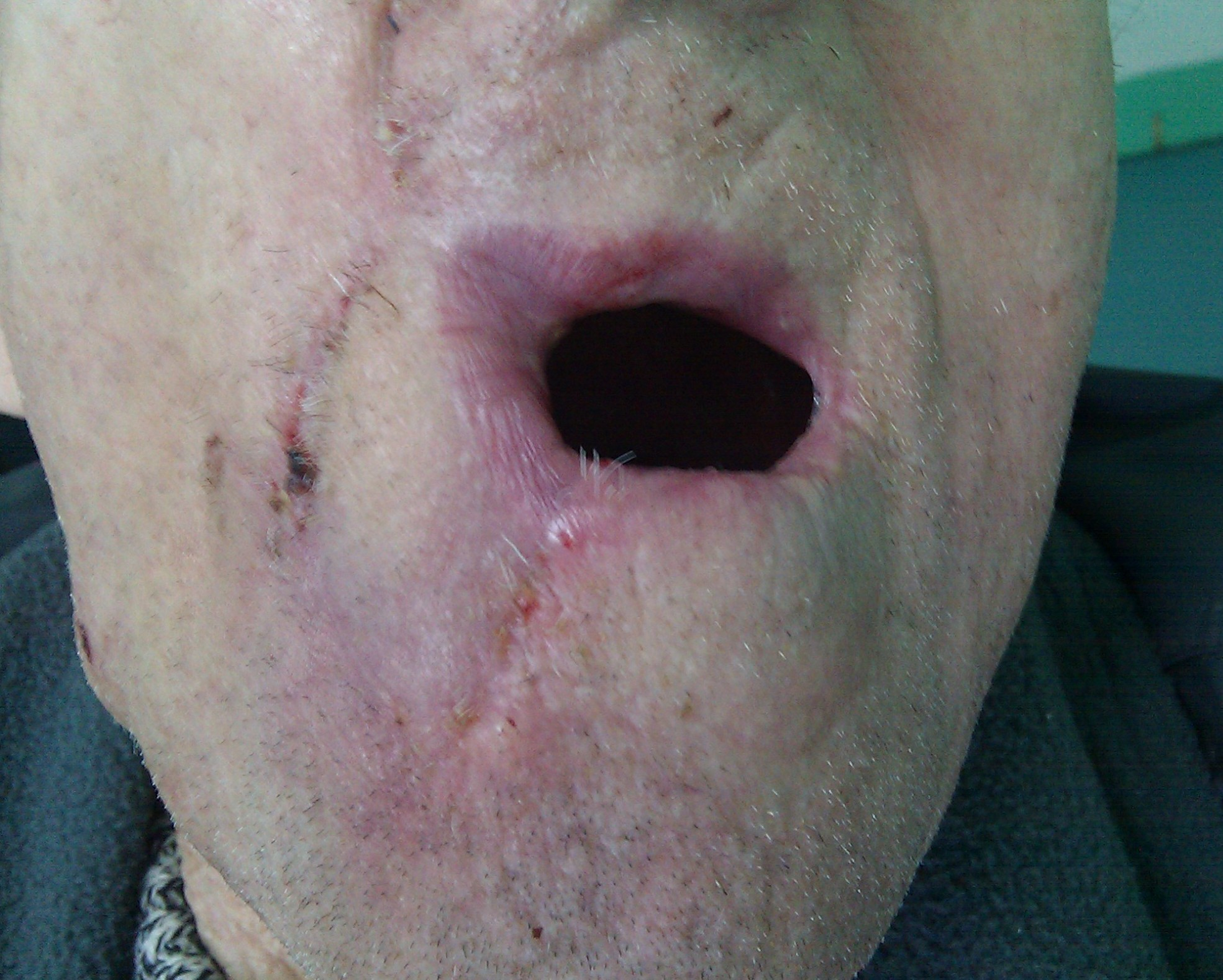
Followup 12 days after 1st surgery

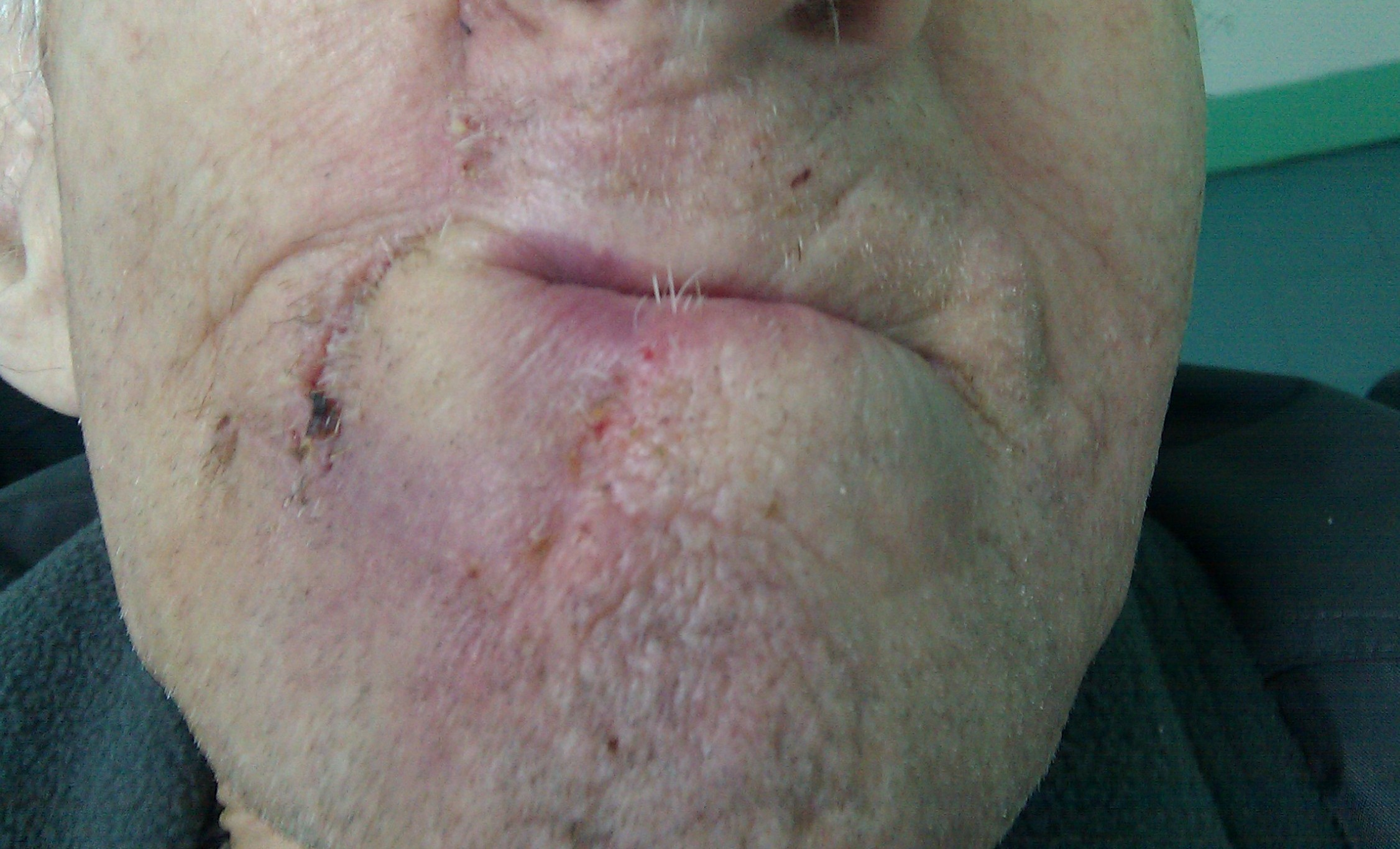
Followup 12 days after 1st surgery

==== Gillies fan flap ====
This flap borrows tissue from the cheek and lip of the uninvolved side of lip with the defect. It restores lip continuity in a one-stage procedure, but has some disadvantages, including an adverse effect on sensation, small size of mouth, and difficulty matching up the vermilion border of the central lip with the lateral lip.

==== Karapandzic flap ====
This flap borrows tissue from the sides of the defect, like the Gilles flap. The difference is that it maintains the nerve and blood supply of the orbicularis oris. The flap comes from both directions to meet in the middle of the defect. This is a one-stage procedure that preserves sensation and oral competence. The main problem with this reconstruction is that it can create a very small mouth opening.

==== Total lip reconstruction ====
Whole lip reconstructed is a challenge. Tissue can be rotated in from the nasolabial or the cheek region bilaterally, but the results are limited by lack of sensation, small size, poor oral competency, and less than optimal appearance.

Immediate post-procedure after Mohs surgery resection of lower lip squamous cell carcinoma

Elevation of depressor anguli oris muscle flaps

Patient immediately after closure of total lower lip reconstruction

For Large Postoperartive Lip defects deltopectoral flap may be useful :its tube pedicle flap to cover bare mandible. After 6 weeks lip reconstruction done

== Complications of reconstruction ==
- Poor cosmetic result
- Lack of oral competence
- Small size of mouth
- Decreased sensation of lips or mouth
- Recurrent disease

== See also ==
- Plastic Surgery
