= Truman Abbe =

American surgeon (1873–1955)

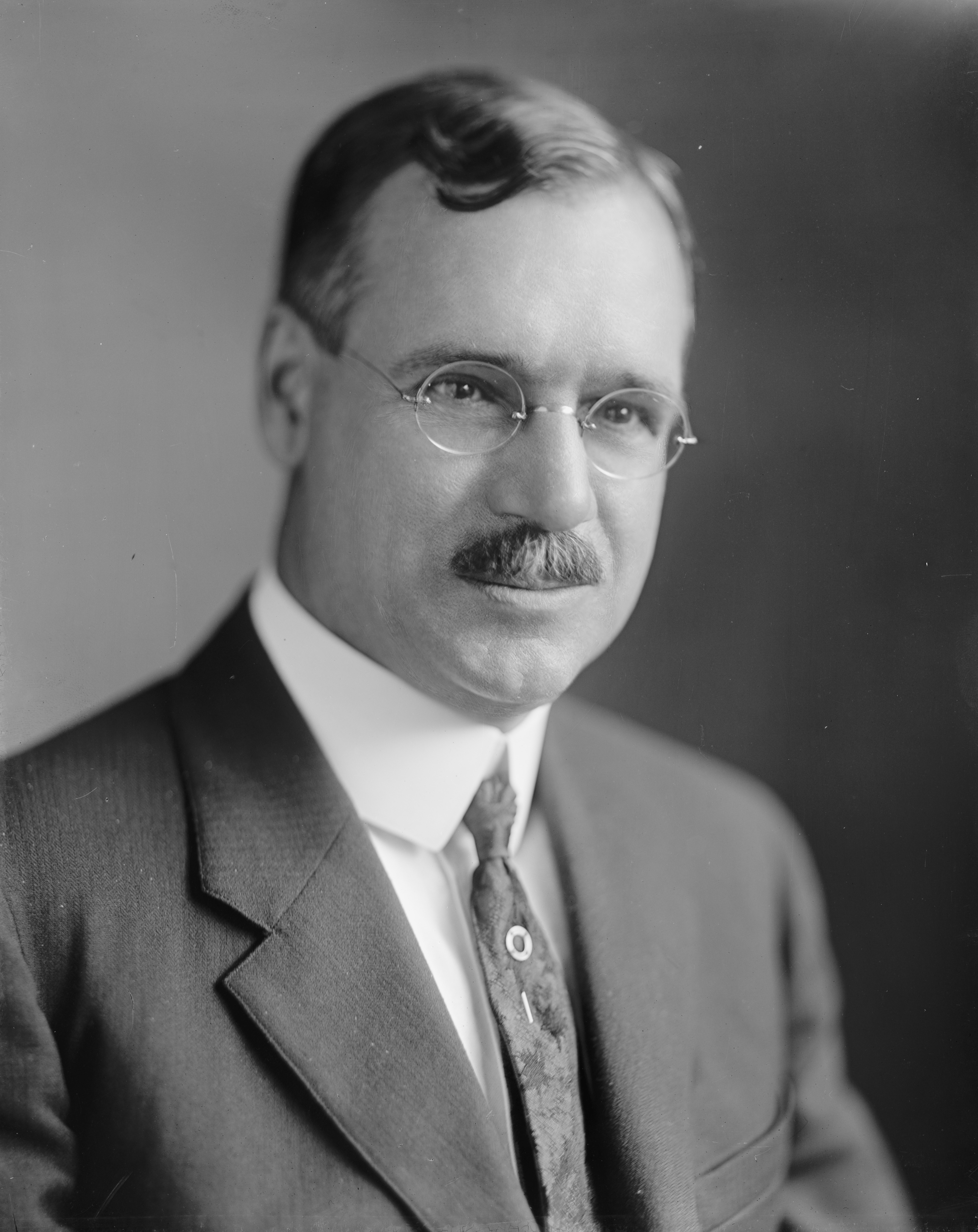
- Born: November 1, 1873; Washington, D.C., U.S.
- Died: May 2, 1955 (aged 81); Washington, D.C., U.S.
- Education: Columbia University Vagelos College of Physicians and Surgeons; Humboldt University of Berlin; Harvard University
- Relatives: Cleveland Abbe (father); Cleveland Abbe Jr. (brother)
- Medical career
- Profession: Surgeon
- Institutions: Georgetown University; George Washington University

Truman Abbe (November 1, 1873 – May 2, 1955) was an American surgeon, son of Cleveland Abbe and brother of Cleveland Abbe Jr.

== Biography ==
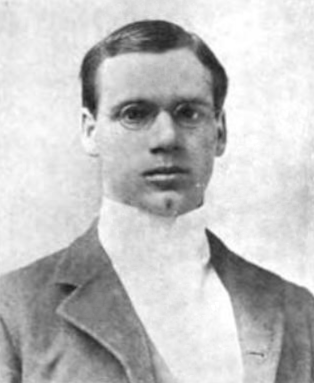
As a Harvard undergraduate, c. 1895

He was born in Washington, D. C. on November 1, 1873. He graduated from Harvard University in 1895. He received his degree in medicine at Columbia University in 1899, then pursued post-graduate studies at the University of Berlin.

Abbe began work in 1902 at Georgetown University. Afterwards, he was appointed instructor at George Washington University (1905). In 1907, he was awarded a silver medal at the Jamestown Exposition for his researches into the uses of radium in medicine.

He died in Washington on May 2, 1955.

His papers were donated to the National Library of Medicine in 1983.
