= Cleveland Abbe Jr. =

American geographer (1872–1934)

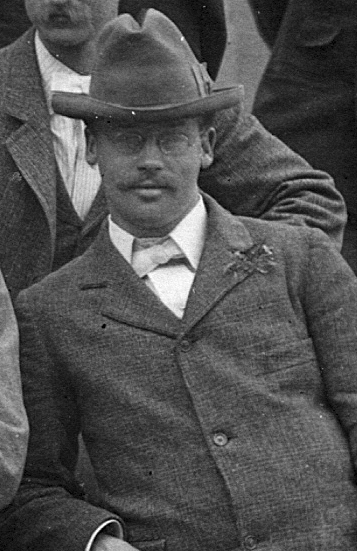
- Abbe at age 25
- Born: March 25, 1872; Washington, D.C.
- Died: April 19, 1934 (aged 62); Ithaca, New York
- Citizenship: United States
- Employer: National Oceanic and Atmospheric Administration
- Parents: Cleveland Abbe (father); Francis M. Neal (mother)
- Relatives: Truman Abbe (brother)

Cleveland Abbe Jr. (March 25, 1872 – April 19, 1934) was an American geographer.

== Biography ==
He was born in Washington, D.C., on March 25, 1872; son of Cleveland and Francis M. (Neal) Abbe. He graduated from Harvard University with an A.B. in 1894 and an A.M. in 1896. He took post-graduate studies at Johns Hopkins University, from which he received a Ph.D. in 1898.

Abbe was an instructor in physiography at the Corcoran scientific school, a part of Columbian university, from 1894 to 1897. He served as an assistant on the Maryland geological survey from 1896 to 1898. From 1898 to 1899, Abbe was professor of geology and biology in Western Maryland college, now called McDaniel College (since 2002), and acting professor of natural science in Winthrop Normal and Industrial college from 1899 to 1900.

He became a fellow of the American Association for the Advancement of Science and the Geological society of America in 1899, and published several scientific reports. From 1901 to 1903 he studied geography at the Imperial University, Vienna.

Afterwards, he worked in various occupations at locations in the eastern part of the United States. He was assistant editor of the Monthly Weather Review from 1908 to 1910, then became assistant librarian of the United States Weather Bureau. He was dismissed from the government position in 1918 for "sympathies for the Imperial German Government", a charge which he "indignantly denied".

He died of heart disease in Ithaca, New York, at age 62, on April 19, 1934.

Mount Abbe in southeast Alaska was named after him in 1936.
